= List of Hellraiser characters =

Hellraiser is a British horror franchise that consists of eleven films, a series of comic books, as well as merchandise based on the series. The franchise is based on the novella The Hellbound Heart by Clive Barker, who would go on to write and direct the adaptation of his story, titled Hellraiser. The films, as well as the comic book series, continually features the Cenobite Pinhead. The series' storyline focuses on a puzzle box that opens a gateway to another dimension, where the Cenobites come forth to take whoever opened the box back to their world, delivering an eternity of torture and experimentation. As well as the Cenobites other recurring characters include heroine Kirsty Cotton and several others.

== Recurring characters ==
Character	Hellraiser (1987)	Hellbound: Hellraiser II	Hellraiser III: Hell on Earth	Hellraiser: Bloodline	Hellraiser: Inferno	Hellraiser: Hellseeker	Hellraiser: Deader	Hellraiser: Hellworld	Hellraiser: Revelations	Hellraiser: Judgment	Hellraiser (2022)
Pinhead Captain Elliot Spencer the Hell Priest	Doug Bradley	Doug Bradley	Doug Bradley	Doug Bradley	Doug Bradley	Doug Bradley	Doug Bradley	Doug Bradley	Stephan Smith Collins Fred Tatasciore^{V}	Paul T. Taylor	Jamie Clayton
Chatterer	Nicholas Vince	Nicholas Vince				Mike Jay Regan	Mike Jay Regan	Mike Jay Regan	Jolene Andersen	Mike Jay Regan	Jason Liles
Derelict The Puzzle Guardian	Frank Baker	John Little	Lawrence Mortorff			Doug Bradley			Daniel Buran	Tony Payne	
Kirsty Cotton Kirsty Singer	Ashley Laurence	Ashley Laurence	Ashley Laurence^{C}			Ashley Laurence					
Female Cenobite	Grace Kirby	Barbie Wilde							Jolene Andersen		
Butterball Cenobite	Simon Bamford	Simon Bamford									
Larry Cotton	Andrew Robinson	Andrew Robinson^{A}	Mentioned								
Julia Cotton	Clare Higgins	Clare Higgins Deborah Joel	Mentioned								
Frank Cotton	Sean Chapman Oliver Smith Andrew Robinson	Oliver Smith Sean Chapman	Mentioned								
Tiffany		Imogen Boorman									
Kyle Macrae		William Hope									
Dr. Philip Channard		Kenneth Cranham									
Joanne "Joey" Summerskill			Terry Farrell								
Philippe "Toymaker" Lemarchand John Merchant Doctor Paul Merchant				Bruce Ramsay							
Detective Joseph Thorne					Craig Sheffer						
Trevor Gooden						Dean Winters					
Amy Klein							Kari Wuhrer				
Winter LeMarchand							Paul Rhys				
Mike								Henry Cavill			
Jake								Christopher Jacot			
Chelsea								Katheryn Winnick			
Ross Craven									Steven Brand		
Steven Craven									Nick Eversman		
Emma Craven									Tracey Fairaway		
Peter Bradley									Sebastien Roberts		
Detective Sean Carter The Preceptor										Damon Carney	
Detective David Carter										Randy Wayne	
Detective Christine										Alexandra Harris	
The Landlady										Heather Langenkamp	
The Auditor										Gary J. Tunnicliffe	
The Assessor										John Gulager	
Riley McKendry											Odessa A'zion

== A ==
=== Amy Klein ===
Amy Klein is a character in the film Hellraiser: Deader, where she is portrayed by Kari Wührer as an adult and Maria Pintea as a young girl. A gonzo-style reporter, Amy was physically (and possibly sexually) abused by her father as a child, which led her to stab him to death. After viewing a videotape her boss Charles received in the mail which depicts a member of a cult known as the Deaders committing suicide and subsequently being resurrected by Deaders leader Winter, Amy travels from London to Bucharest to look into the Deaders. Finding another tape and the Lament Configuration puzzle box in the apartment of a heavily decayed-looking Deader named Marla, who subsequently appears to her several times, Amy tinkers with the box, causing her to have a brief encounter with the Cenobite Pinhead. Tracking down Winter and the Deader's home, Amy is forced into experiencing something of a vision quest by Winter, who wishes to use her to solve the Lament Configuration, something neither he nor his followers can do. Eventually snapping out of her trance-like state, Amy is almost goaded into killing herself (so she can be resurrected later) with a knife by Winter, but relents and inadvertently solves the Lament Configuration by hurling it at a wall. Summoning Pinhead and the Cenobites, Amy witnesses them rip Winter (revealed to be a descendant of box creator Phillip Lemarchand) apart with hooked chains and subsequently kill the Deaders once and for all. When the Cenobites turn their attention on her, Amy, to rob them of collecting her soul, commits suicide by stabbing herself, causing the Lament Configuration to make the Cenobites vanish and cause the Deader's lair to collapse.

== B ==
=== Butterball ===
Butterball is one of the first Cenobites introduced in the franchise, appearing both in the initial novella, The Hellbound Heart, as well as the films Hellraiser and Hellbound: Hellraiser II. Butterball also made an appearance in Clive Barker's comic book sequel to Hellbound, the Hellraiser comic book series published by BOOM! comics in 2011. Despite appearing to be the second-in-command of the Cenobites in The Hellbound Heart, in the film and comics he primarily functions as a member of Pinhead's entourage.

==== Appearance ====
Like the other Cenobites, Butterball has undergone extreme body modification and ritual scarification; other than his massive size and obesity, Butterball's other distinguishing feature is a series of stitches through his eyelids, which he usually keeps hidden by a pair of round sunglasses. Although he is apparently a high-ranking member of the Cenobites in the novella, and has the most dialogue in the book, in the films he is the most removed of Pinhead's entourage. Butterball is completely stationary and silent, occasionally licking his lips with a bloated tongue. He only becomes physically aggressive during climactic battles, attacking Kirsty at the end of the original Hellraiser, Channard at the end of Hellbound, and Kirsty again in the seventh issue of Barker's BOOM! Hellraiser series.

==== Design ====
Actor Simon Bamford met Clive Barker through a friend who was doing prop work for Barker's plays. Bamford and Barker became friends, and Bamford joined his theater company. After the company disbanded, Bamford contacted Barker to see what he was doing, and Barker invited him to join his latest project, Hellraiser. Bamford wore a fatsuit and foam latex mask. He was designed to look as if it would be impossible for him to eat anything else. His torn-open stomach was meant to give the impression that he could directly interact with his organs at will.

==== Appearances ====
Butterball is first introduced in the novella The Hellbound Heart, in which he is the first of the Cenobites to appear, and their apparent second-in-command behind the Engineer, whose presence is only summoned in special circumstances:

"...the hooks that transfixed the flaps of its eyes... were wed by an intricate system of chains passed through flesh and bone alike..."

Along with the other Cenobites, Butterball takes antagonist Frank Cotton back to the Cenobite realm after Cotton opens the Lament Configuration, expecting to find a hedonistic paradise that will cure his sensual nihilism. Despite being warned that what he finds may not be what he is expecting, Frank willingly goes along with the Cenobites, only to find that—past an initial euphoria—the experiences to which the Cenobites subject him are so intense as to be torturous. Butterball is later part of the Cenobite contingent that makes a deal with Frank's brother, Rory's friend, Kirsty, to return Frank to them in exchange for her own freedom, after she unwittingly makes a deal to return to the Cenobite realm by opening the box.

Butterball would later appear — and receive a name — in the closing credits of the film adaptation Hellraiser. Unlike the other Cenobites, who are sent back by Kirsty (here presented as Frank's niece) to the Cenobite realm during the film's climax, Butterball is seemingly "killed" when a section of roof collapses on him as the schism opened by the puzzle box causes a series of tremors to shake Frank's house.

Butterball reappears in Hellbound: Hellraiser II, with no explanation given as to his revival. Like Pinhead, he is reminded of his humanity by Kirsty, after which he fights to protect her against the newly created Cenobite, Dr. Channard. He is killed by Channard after a brief fight, after which he reverts to a non-mutilated human form. This is his last cinematic appearance, though he was revived in the comics.

Butterball reappears in Clive Barker's comic book series for BOOM! comics. Butterball appears in the fifth issue as Pinhead's "secret weapon", ambushing and restraining Kirsty when she finally confronts Pinhead. The confrontation turns out to be a trap arranged by Pinhead to betray his fellow Cenobites, and Pinhead slips Kirsty one of his knives, which she uses to kill Butterball.

Butterball reappears yet again in The Scarlet Gospels, once again being betrayed by Pinhead. This time, Pinhead kills him with a spell that liquefies Butterball's innards, causing him to vomit up his internal organs in a geyser of blood. In a final show of contempt, Butterball restrains Pinhead as he dies, so that the projectile of blood strikes Pinhead in the face.

==== Reception ====
Shock Till You Drop ranked him number seven in their list of the ten best Cenobites, calling him "infamously creepy and mysterious".

== C ==
=== Chelsea Murdock ===
Chelsea Murdock is a character in the film Hellraiser: Hellworld where she is played by Katheryn Winnick. A teenaged girl, Chelsea is a fan of the MMORPG computer game Hellworld, a game based upon the Hellraiser mythology. After her friend Adam immolates himself with gasoline due to his obsession with Hellworld, Chelsea abandons the game, but two years after Adam's funeral is pressured by her friends into attending a Hellworld centered party at Leviathan House. While at the party, Chelsea is plagued by several bizarre incidents seemingly caused by the host of the party and, after escaping Leviathan House, witnesses Pinhead murder a police officer she had found patrolling the woods. Returning to the now abandoned Leviathan House after receiving a fake cell phone call from her friend Jake, Chelsea is chased to the attic of the mansion by the Cenobites and undead versions of her friends Mike and Allison. While in the attic, Chelsea is called by Jake, who realizes that everything they are experienced is some sort of mass hallucination. After rejoining Jake, Chelsea is confronted by the party host, who she had discovered was Adam's father. After the host causes Jake to become trapped in a coffin, he begins burying Chelsea alive, revealing he had drugged her and her friends and buried them, using cell phones to send messages to them and cause them to hallucinate everything, all in an attempt to avenge the death of Adam. Before the host can finish burying her, Chelsea returns to consciousness and is dug up by the police along with Jake. The police reveal to Chelsea that she and Jake have been buried for days and that they were only found due to anonymous call from Leviathan House, which Chelsea believes was made by Adam's spirit, which she briefly spots gazing out a window of Leviathan House. After the events of the Hellworld party, Chelsea and Jake, having become a couple, decide to go on vacation together, only to be visited by the apparent spirit of the host, who had earlier been killed by the real Cenobites (summoned by a puzzle box Adam had created shortly before killing himself). The host causes Chelsea's car to spin out of control before disappearing, leaving both Chelsea and Jake unharmed but severely shaken.

== D ==
=== Doctor Paul Merchant ===
Doctor Paul Merchant is a character in the film Hellraiser: Bloodline where he is portrayed by Bruce Ramsay. A future descendant of Phillip LeMerchand, the creator of the gateway to Hell known as the Lament Configuration, Paul, being the last of his bloodline, is the only one who can permanently close the gateway to Hell his ancestor opened centuries ago. Hijacking a space station known as the Minos, which he designed, Paul uses a remote-controlled robot to open the Lament Configuration, summoning the Cenobite Pinhead and his minions. After releasing Pinhead, Paul is captured by a group of soldiers, who contain him while they investigate what he has been doing on the station. Left alone with a female soldier named Rimmer, Paul tells her of his family's history, telling her he must complete his work or else everyone on the station is doomed. When it becomes apparent that something really is stalking through the space station, Paul is released by the soldiers, who are killed one by one by the Cenobites. Managing to finish his work and narrowly escape Pinhead through the use of a hologram, Paul flies away from the Minos in a space shuttle with Rimmer while the Minos changes into a giant puzzle box, originally designed by Phillip LeMerchand, which completely destroys Pinhead.

=== Derelict, The Puzzle Guardian ===
Derelict, The Puzzle Guardian is a character in the film Hellraiser portrayed by Frank Baker. A filthy-looking vagrant, the Puzzle Guardian acts as the protector of the Lament Configuration puzzle box, passing it from hand to hand and saving it from danger. The Puzzle Guardian first appears in Morocco, where it sells Frank Cotton the Lament Configuration. Later, the Puzzle Guardian, having traveled to England, begins stalking Kirsty Cotton, at one point going into the pet shop where the young woman works and eating a large amount of crickets before being shooed away. When Kirsty and her boyfriend Steve attempt to burn the Lament Configuration, the Puzzle Guardian appears and saves the box before transforming into a skeletal dragon and flying away. The Puzzle Guardian is last seen back in India with the Lament Configuration, asking a prospective customer "What's your pleasure, sir?"

At the end of Hellbound: Hellraiser II, Little John plays the cricket-covered face of the Puzzle Guardian, which appears on the Pillar of Souls, asking a shocked moving man, "What is your pleasure, sir?"

In Hellraiser III: Hell on Earth, Lawrence Mortorff plays the Puzzle Guardian, who sells nightclub owner J.P. Monroe the Pillar of Souls in the Pyramid Gallery. A week later, when Joey Summerskill and Terri investigate the Pyramid Gallery, they learn the shop has been closed for over a month, the owner having gone on vacation to Hawaii.

Doug Bradley portrays the Puzzle Guardian in Hellraiser: Hellseeker, where the Puzzle Guardian owns a sweatshop in a warehouse. The Puzzle Guardian, when Trevor Gooden appears in the warehouse after receiving a business card with "All Problems Solved" inscribed on it, sells Trevor the Lament Configuration, stating that the price of the box is far larger than he can imagine, which Trevor will learn eventually. Later, when Trevor returns to the Puzzle Guardian's warehouse, he finds it abandoned.

The Hellraiser comics by Epic explain the origin of the Puzzle Guardian, revealing there is one for every puzzle to Hell. The story "Mazes of the Mind" in the fifth issue of Clive Barker's Hellraiser states that Puzzle Guardians are created by the Cenobite Orno, who tampers with the mind of a denizen of Hell (referred to as "Raw Material") and imbues them with some of his own seed before sending them to Earth to have sex with a woman; after impregnating a woman, who will die during child birth, the Raw Material will commit suicide. When the child of the Raw Material reaches the age of sixteen, Orno reveals their destiny to them, giving them the puzzle they will guard.

== E ==
=== Emma Craven ===
Emma Craven is a character in the film Hellraiser: Revelations where she is portrayed by Tracey Fairaway.

=== Engineer ===
The Engineer is a character first appearing at the end of The Hellbound Heart as the unseen leader of Pinhead's Order of the Gash who appears only as flashes of light (some minute and others blinding) using living and dead people alike as conduits of its will. Whether these people the Engineer possesses are illusions or actually exist remains unknown; its first conduit was the then dead Julia, whose severed head was able to speak, which the book draws special attention to describing as impossible: "Bereft of lungs, how could it speak? It spoke nevertheless--"

In the film Hellraiser, the Engineer is a demon which prowls the corridors of Hell, and appears as an amalgam of various animals. The Engineer first appears to chase Kirsty Cotton out of Hell when she solves the Lament Configuration puzzle box in her hospital room. Later, after Kirsty banishes the Cenobites back to Hell and attempts to escape her rapidly decaying house, the Engineer appears again. Grappling with Kirsty and her boyfriend Steve as they attempt to reclaim the Lament Configuration, the Engineer is banished back to Hell when Kirsty manages to grab the puzzle box and solves it.

The Engineer was to appear in Hellbound: Hellraiser II, but was removed completely, except from the ending scene when the Pillar of Souls appears, where his face is attached. However, the character can still be briefly seen through an editing error at the end of Hellbound, as Kirsty and Tiffany flee the Labyrinth racing for the closing gate as souls flee all around them. Only the Engineer, and the souls fleeing, are visible in the orphaned shot (interlaced with shots of Kirsty and Tiffany fleeing), which takes place just as Leviathan begins to transform into a puzzle box. The orphaned shot remains in the stand-alone DVD released in Region 1.

In Hellraiser: Inferno, another being called the Engineer appears, a faceless and near-mythic criminal played by Ray Miceli. When a detective named Joseph Thorne begins hunting for it and the child it has presumably kidnapped, the Engineer continually taunts the detective, systematically killing the man's friends and loved ones while leaving a child's finger at all the crime scenes. When it is revealed to Joseph by Pinhead that the detective has been in Hell ever since he solved the Lament Configuration, Pinhead also reveals that the Engineer is Joseph's "flesh", the embodiment of his carnal desires which have doomed his soul to repeat the same sequence of events for all eternity.

The Engineer is referenced to in Hellraiser: Hellworld as an enemy in the online computer game Hellworld; later in the film, when the characters begin to question whether they are actually in Hell, one of them sarcastically asks "Where are the Engineers?"

The version of the Engineer from the first Hellraiser film made only one appearance in the Epic comic series, in the seventh issue of the Clive Barker's Hellraiser anthology series. In the story "Under the Knife", the Engineer, along with several Cenobites, is summoned via the puzzle known as The Heart of Damnation and, shortly after being summoned, is returned to Hell when the puzzle is damaged.

== F ==
=== Frank Cotton ===
Frank Cotton appears in the film Hellraiser where he is portrayed by Sean Chapman as a man and Oliver Smith as an undead being. The criminal brother of Larry Cotton, Frank, believing he has experienced everything the world has to offer, buys the Lament Configuration puzzle box from a merchant in North Africa and brings it back to his dead mother's home in England. Solving the puzzle box, Frank opens a portal and summons the Cenobites, who take him to their realm for use as a "subject" in their sadomasochistic experiments. Frank manages to escape when his brother Larry cuts his hand and bleeds onto the spot where Frank was taken by the Cenobites. He convinces his sister-in-law, Julia, to murder men for him so that he can consume their blood and internal organs, which progressively regenerates his body and allows them to resume an affair they began on her wedding day. After Frank kills Larry to harvest his skin, Larry's daughter, Kirsty, turns him over to the Cenobites, who tear his body to pieces before taking him back to their realm.

In Hellbound: Hellraiser II, Frank appears before the now institutionalized Kirsty in her room, pretending to be her father and leaving her a message written in his own blood asking for help. When Kirsty enters the Cenobite realm, she finds herself in Frank's personal Hell, a chamber filled with writhing female forms where Frank can never sate his lust. Attempting to rape Kirsty, Frank reverts to his skinless appearance when Kirsty causes him to catch fire. Frank is finally defeated when Julia appears and tears out his heart.

Frank is mentioned in Hellraiser: Hellseeker, which states that he and Larry had both stockpiled large fortunes, of which Kirsty is the sole beneficiary.

=== Female Cenobite ===
The Female Cenobite is a Cenobite appearing in the movies Hellraiser and Hellbound: Hellraiser II, and in Clive Barker's comic book by BOOM! comics in 2011. The role was played by Grace Kirby in the first film and Barbie Wilde in the sequel.

==== Appearance ====
Like the other Cenobites, she is clad in black leather and is mutilated. In the original film, several wires peel back the skin around her neck, causing her to have a raspy, whispery voice. She is given deeply sunken facial features with bluish skin and a few hairs left on her head. In the sequel four of the wires holding her throat open have been removed, leaving just one frame, and her skin tone is made white with no hairs on her head. When she is killed at the end of the second Hellraiser film (after Channard throws a knife into her open neck wound), she reverts to her original human form, revealing that she had once been a pretty woman.

==== Design ====
Clive Barker recruited his cousin, Grace Kirby, for the role. The Female Cenobite was inspired by scarification and body piercing in National Geographic articles. The make-up took three hours to apply, caused her discomfort, and prevented Kirby from sitting. When Kirby declined to return, Barbie Wilde took over the role. Wilde speculated that the producers were interested in her because of her background in mime, which was commonly believed in the industry to help with performing under prosthetic make-up. Wilde's different facial features contributed to the change in appearance for the character. Paul Kane, author of The Hellraiser Films and Their Legacy, describes her throat wound as representative of male fears of female sexuality. Kane says the crew gave the character various obscene nicknames referencing this.

The Female Cenobite originally did not have a backstory, and Wilde said Hellraiser II director Tony Randel's description of her character's motivation amounted to, "You're dead". Gary J. Tunnicliffe later made the character a former nun. In 2009, Wilde contributed to The Hellbound Hearts, a collection of short stories inspired by Clive Barker's original novella. Wilde says her story, about a nun who willingly sacrifices her humanity to become a Cenobite, is about a non-specific female Cenobite, not necessarily the one she portrayed in Hellraiser II.

==== Merchandising ====
In 2004, NECA released a Female Cenobite action figure.

==== Reception ====
In ranking the character fourth in their list of ten best Cenobites, Shock Till You Drop praised both actresses' acting and said that she brings "a charming nastiness" to the films.

== J ==
=== Jake ===
Jake is a character in the film Hellraiser: Hellworld where he is portrayed by Christopher Jacot.

=== John Merchant ===
John Merchant is a character in the film Hellraiser: Bloodline where he is portrayed by Bruce Ramsay. An architect and descendant of Phillip LeMerchand, John lives with his wife Bobbi and young son Jack in New York City. Due to a curse placed upon his family, John has recurring dreams of the demon Angelique, who was summoned when his ancestor Phillip created the Lament Configuration, a puzzle box which can open a gateway to Hell. Shortly after Angelique appears at a ceremony celebrating the completion of a new building (which resembles the Lament Configuration) designed by him, John's family is kidnapped by the demon and the recently summoned Cenobite Pinhead. Forced into working on a larger portal to Hell by his family's captors, John sabotages the portal and is promptly killed afterward by Pinhead with a scissor-like chain. Shortly after John's death, Bobbi and Jack manage to banish both Pinhead and Angelique back to Hell with the Lament Configuration.

=== Joseph Thorne ===
Joseph Thorne is a character in the film Hellraiser: Inferno where he is portrayed by Craig Sheffer as an adult and J.B. Gaynor as a child. A largely corrupt detective with a penchant for sleight of hand and puzzles, Joseph believes himself to be above the law and regularly engages in illegal behavior all the while neglecting his family. While investigating the murder of an old acquaintance of his, who was seemingly torn apart by hooked chains, Joseph is given the Lament Configuration puzzle box by a fellow detective who discovered the box at the scene of the crime. Solving the box in the bathroom of a motel after having sex with a prostitute, Joseph subsequently has a dream where he is attacked by the Cenobites before awakening. After solving the box, bizarre events begin to plague Joseph as he searches for a child abducted by a being simply referred to as the Engineer. As those close to him begin to die, Joseph is directed to his childhood home by Pinhead, where Joseph, after facing the reanimated corpses of his dead friends and family members, finds himself in a dark void, where Pinhead reveals to Joseph he is in Hell, his sinful lifestyle and disregard for everyone but himself having doomed him to relive the events of the past few days over and over again. After being torn apart by Pinhead's hooked chains, Joseph awakens back in the motel room where he solved the box and believes he has been given a second chance, only to discover upon going to work that he is still in Hell. Shooting himself in the mouth with his own gun, Joseph awakens once more in the motel room and, upon exiting it, finds himself in his childhood bedroom. Fully realizing he is doomed, Joseph breaks down completely and is left screaming hysterically.

=== Joey Summerskill ===
Joanne "Joey" Summerskill is a character in the film Hellraiser III: Hell on Earth where she is portrayed by Terry Farrell. A news reporter for Channel 8, Joey, after witnessing a teenaged boy be torn apart by hooked chains in a hospital room, begins investigating The Boiler Room, the nightclub where the boy was found by a girl named Terri, who Joey befriends. As she investigates the club and the Lament Configuration puzzle box which was found in a pillar bought by club owner J.P. Monroe, Joey is continually contacted by Captain Elliot Spencer, the human side of the Cenobite Pinhead. Meeting with Elliot in Purgatory, Joey learns from the captain that his evil side, Pinhead, has been released from his imprisonment in the Pillar of Souls and that it is up to her to stop the Cenobite. After being told that she must trick Pinhead into fusing back together with Elliot, Joey heads to The Boiler Room, where she finds all the club patrons and her friend and cameraman Doc Fisher slaughtered by Pinhead, who confronts Joey and demands she give him the Lament Configuration. Fleeing from Pinhead, Joey manages to send his newly created Cenobite minions to Hell before Pinhead, appearing as Joey's dead father in a Heaven-like setting, tricks Joey into giving him the Lament Configuration. As Pinhead prepares to change Joey into a Cenobite, he is confronted by Captain Spencer, who forcibly fuses with his evil side. Free from Pinhead's machinery, Joey sends the now whole Cenobite back to Hell by stabbing him in the chest with the Lament Configuration when the puzzle box changes into a diamond shape. With Pinhead banished, Joey disposes of the Lament Configuration in some newly laid cement.

=== Julia Cotton ===
Julia Cotton is a character in the film Hellraiser where she is portrayed by Clare Higgins. The second wife of Larry Cotton and stepmother of Kirsty Cotton, Julia and her family, after living in Boston, move to England and into the house of Larry's deceased mother. While in the house, Julia discovers the zombified version of Larry's brother Frank, with whom Julia had had an affair. At first horrified of Frank, Julia begins to do his bidding in attempt to resurrect him, seducing men and bringing them to the house so Frank can feed off them. Eventually, after an encounter with Kirsty and when Frank is almost fully human looking, Julia leads Larry to Frank, who kills him and steals his skin; afterward, Julia and Frank have sex. When Kirsty returns home in search of Frank, Julia and Frank attempt to trick and kill her, an attack which results in Julia's death at Frank's hands, when, as Julia restrains Kirsty, Frank accidentally stabs her with his switchblade. As Kirsty flees, Julia slumps to the ground and is prematurely aged when Frank uses his powers of absorption against her. Kirsty later finds Julia's corpse chained to a bed by the Cenobites.

In Hellbound: Hellraiser II, Julia is released from Hell when Doctor Phillip Channard has one of the mentally ill patients in his care mutilate himself on the mattress Julia died on. A skinless being (played by Deborah Joel), Julia seduces Channard and has him bring her victims which she can feed on to restore her human form, which she succeeds in doing. After Channard has a girl named Tiffany solve the Lament Configuration puzzle box, Julia and Channard enter Hell, where Julia betrays Channard and knocks him into a Cenobite Transformation Chamber, revealing that the god of Hell, Leviathan, had allowed her to return to Earth to collect souls. Afterward, in the personal Hell of Frank, Julia, after turning against Frank, attacks Tiffany and Kirsty, only to be sucked out of her skin and be sent tumbling down a wind tunnel.

Hellraiser creator Clive Barker had originally intended to have Julia become the main villain of the Hellraiser series and be one of the few female slasher villains, but these plans fell through when Clare Higgins declined playing Julia again and the popularity of Cenobite leader Pinhead rose dramatically.

== K ==
=== Kyle Macrae ===
Kyle Macrae is a character in Hellbound: Hellraiser II portrayed by William Hope. Kyle was Channard's student. Both Kyle and Channard were intrigued by Kirsty's tale of what happened to her family. Kyle stumbled upon multiple Lament Configuration boxes in Channard's house, and witnessed him using a mental patient to summon Julia. Kyle watched as Julia killed the patient. He alerted Kirsty, and they went to the house to bring back Larry. Kyle searched the house after telling Kirsty to stay put, and is killed by Julia, who drains his life force.

== L ==
=== Larry Cotton ===
Larry Cotton is the father of Kirsty Cotton and Frank Cotton's younger brother. He appears only in Hellraiser, portrayed by Andrew Robinson. Larry is married to Julia, his second wife, after his first wife and Kirsty's mother passes away. In comparison to Frank, Larry is timid and a pushover, leading Julia to have an affair with Frank. While moving his family into his childhood home, Larry cuts himself on a nail, and his blood lands on where Frank was taken by the Cenobites, reviving him. He is later killed by Julia and Frank, and his skin is worn by Frank to hide from the Cenobites and aid in Frank's regeneration.

Larry is mentioned in Hellbound: Hellraiser II, when Frank poses as Larry to Kirsty, claiming to be trapped in Hell. Later, Pinhead informs Kirsty that Larry is in his own "personal hell". He is again mentioned in Hellraiser: Hellseeker by Pinhead, who tells Kirsty that Larry is waiting for her in Hell.

In The Hellbound Heart, Larry's name was Rory and he is simply a friend of Kirsty rather than her father.

=== Leviathan ===
Leviathan is an entity introduced in Hellbound: Hellraiser II. A giant silver diamond which emits a constant beam of black light which can cause those caught in it to experience past memories, Leviathan is introduced as the god of Hell, lord of its labyrinth, and creator of the Cenobites. After Doctor Phillip Channard is taken to Hell by Julia Cotton, she reveals that Leviathan had allowed her to return to Earth to bring it more souls before knocking Channard into a Cenobite Transformation Chamber. After a girl named Tiffany solves the Lament Configuration, which had been changed into a miniature replica of Leviathan by the Cenobite Pinhead, Leviathan itself changes into a giant puzzle box. As Leviathan changes forms, it quickly loses its captive souls; the souls escape to Earth before the gateways to the realm close.

A reference to Leviathan is made in the film Hellraiser: Hellworld, the main setting of which is an old mansion known as Leviathan House.

In the Hellraiser comics by Epic, Leviathan is described as a being obsessed with law and order and views the human realm as chaotic and wrong; Leviathan uses the Cenobites as its foot soldiers against chaos and flesh.

== N ==
=== Nico Bradley ===
Nico Bradley is a character in the film Hellraiser: Revelations where he is portrayed by Jay Gillespie.

== P ==
=== Philip Channard, Doctor ===
Dr. Philip Channard is a character in the film Hellbound: Hellraiser II where he is portrayed by Kenneth Cranham. Dr. Channard was a psychiatrist who ran the Channard institute, where patient Kirsty Cotton tells him about the Cenobites. At home, it is revealed that Channard has the mattress that Kirsty's stepmother, Julia, died on. Channard's assistant, Kyle, sneaks in to his house to find that Channard was obsessed with the Lament Configuration box and the portal to Hell. Kyle watches as Channard brings back a patient from the ward as a sacrifice for Julia's resurrection. Channard brings Julia back more corpses for her to feed on so she can regain her skin. Eventually, using his other patient Tiffany to solve the Lament Configuration, Channard reached the labyrinth and was turned into a Cenobite. He soon kills Pinhead and other Cenobites, but was ultimately accidentally killed by Leviathan.

=== Phillip Lemarchand ===
Phillip Lemarchand is a character in the film Hellraiser: Bloodline where he is portrayed by Bruce Ramsay. A toymaker in 18th century France, Phillip is commissioned by the wealthy aristocrat Duc de L'Isle to create an intricate puzzle box. Creating the box, the Lament Configuration, Phillip brings it to de L'Isle and afterward witnesses de L'Isle use the box to summon the demon Angelique. Realizing what he has unleashed, Phillip designs a counter to the Lament Configuration, which he attempts to steal back. As Phillip tries to steal back the Lament Configuration, discovering that de L'Isle has been betrayed by his servant Jacques, he is found by Jacques and Angelique, who mortally wound him. Dying, Phillip, upon being found by his wife, tells her to flee and save their unborn child. A portrait of Phillip appears in Hellraiser: Hellworld in Leviathan House, which the host of a party being held there claims was built by Lemarchand, though the authenticity of this story is questionable.

Before his appearance in Hellraiser: Bloodline, Phillip appeared in the Hellraiser comics by Epic, which depict him as a sociopath who was driven to create the Lament Configuration by the Cenobite known as the Baron. After the creation of his first puzzle box, Phillip traveled the world and created innumerable other puzzles before growing weary of life.

== R ==
=== Riley McKendry ===
Riley McKendry is a character in the film Hellraiser (2022) where she is portrayed by Odessa A'zion.

=== Rimmer ===
Rimmer is a character in the film Hellraiser: Bloodline where she is played by Christine Harnos. A soldier in the far future, Rimmer and several others, after Doctor Paul Merchant hijacks his own space station the Minos, boards the station and take Paul prisoner. Left in a cell with Paul, Rimmer is told by him his family history, about how his ancestor Phillip Lemarchand created a puzzle box known as the Lament Configuration, which can summon entities known as the Cenobites, which Paul had earlier brought onto the Minos with the intent of destroying them and the box. At first disbelieving of Paul, Rimmer, when it becomes apparent that something really is aboard the Minos, decides to aid Paul in his plans. Managing to kill Cenobite Pet the Chatter Beast by causing the monster to explode via tampering with pressure valves in the hallway the beast is in, Rimmer eventually regroups with Paul (her fellow soldiers having been slain by the Cenobites) and together the two escape the Minos on a space shuttle. While flying through space, Paul and Rimmer appear on a monitor to Cenobite leader Pinhead, watching as he is completely eradicated by the Minos, which changes into the Elysium Configuration, which permanently destroys the gateway to Hell the Lament Configuration had created.

=== Ross Craven ===
Ross Craven is a character in the film Hellraiser: Revelations where he is portrayed by Steven Brand.

== S ==
=== Sarah Craven ===
Sarah Craven is a character in the film Hellraiser: Revelations where she is portrayed by Devon Sorvari.

=== Steven Craven ===
Steven Craven is a character in the film Hellraiser: Revelations where he is portrayed by Nick Eversman. Fred Tatasciore portrayed "Faceless" Steven in a nightmare sequence, as he (really Nico) gets his face cut off by Female Chatterer and Pinhead.

=== Steve O'Donnell ===
Steven "Steve" O'Donnell was the former boyfriend of Kirsty Cotton who only appears in Hellraiser and is portrayed by actor Robert Hines. He first appears during the Cottons dining party and again when he and Kirsty were about to go home and sleep together. He is not seen until after he searches for Kirsty when she left the hospital to warn her father. After giving Frank to the Cenobites, Steve manages to find her only to encounter the Engineer. After banishing the Cenobites, he watches Kirsty burn the Lament Configuration until the Puzzle Guardian grabs the box and flies away.

Though he doesn't appear in Hellbound: Hellraiser II, he is mentioned by Detective Bronson.

== T ==
=== Tiffany ===
Tiffany is a character in the film Hellbound: Hellraiser II where she is portrayed by Imogen Boorman. A mute young girl with an affinity for puzzles, Tiffany, whose real name is never stated, is a patient in the Channard Institute, a hospital for the mentally ill. After aiding Julia Cotton, an escapee from Hell, restore her human appearance, Doctor Phillip Channard has Tiffany solve the Lament Configuration, a puzzle box which can open a gateway to Hell. Solving the puzzle, Tiffany is spared by the summoned Cenobites, who realize that Tiffany had not intentionally summoned them. When the Cenobites leave, Tiffany wanders into her own personal Hell, a demented carnival where she relives a memory of her mother being killed by Channard shortly after she had been brought to the Channard Institute. Escaping her Hell, Tiffany meets Kirsty Cotton and escapes back to Earth with her after an encounter with Julia. Finding herself in the Channard Institute, Tiffany, when Channard, now a Cenobite, appears, utters her first line ("Oh shit") before fleeing back to Hell with Kirsty. Saved from Channard by the other Cenobites, who are reminded of their humanity by Kirsty, Tiffany manages to close the gateway to Hell she opened by re-solving the Lament Configuration, which Pinhead had changed into a diamond shape. As Leviathan, the god of Hell, changes into a giant puzzle box, unintentionally killing the Channard Cenobite, Tiffany and Kirsty narrowly manage to escape back to Earth through the closing Hell gateway. Tiffany is last seen walking away from the Channard Institute alongside Kirsty.

=== Trevor Gooden ===
Trevor Gooden is a character in the film Hellraiser: Hellseeker where he is portrayed by Dean Winters. A lowly office worker and the husband of Kirsty Cotton, Trevor loses his memory after he and Kirsty plunge off a bridge in a car accident. As the police search for Kirsty, who has disappeared, Trevor attempts to go back to living a normal life, but finds himself stalked by the Cenobites and plagued by nightmarish hallucinations and flashbacks. After his three mistresses and best friend, who had mentioned a plot to kill Kirsty and take her inheritance, wind up dead, Trevor is arrested when he is found with one of the bodies. Taken to the morgue in the bowels of the police department, Trevor is confronted by Pinhead, who restores Trevor's memories; Trevor had bought the Lament Configuration and planned to use it to kill Kirsty, though his plan backfired when Kirsty made a deal with Pinhead, offering five souls in exchange for her own. Trevor's mistresses and friend were the first four souls, with Trevor himself being the fifth, Kirsty having shot him in the head and sent him to his own personal Hell.

== V ==
=== Vagrant ===
Vagrant is a character in the film Hellraiser: Revelations where he is portrayed by Daniel Buran.

== See also ==
- Cenobite
