= Hellraiser: Inferno =

2000 horror film

- Home video poster
- Directed by: Scott Derrickson
- Written by: Paul Harris Boardman; Scott Derrickson
- Based on: Characters by Clive Barker
- Produced by: W.K. Border; Joel Soisson
- Starring: Craig Sheffer; Nicholas Turturro; James Remar; Doug Bradley
- Cinematography: Nathan Hope
- Edited by: Kirk M. Morri
- Music by: Walter Werzowa
- Production companies: Dimension Films; Neo Art & Logic
- Distributed by: Buena Vista Home Entertainment
- Release date: October 3, 2000
- Running time: 100 minutes
- Country: United States
- Language: English

Hellraiser: Inferno (also known as Hellraiser V: Inferno) is a 2000 American horror film. It is the fifth installment in the Hellraiser series, and the first Hellraiser film to be released direct-to-video. It was directed by Scott Derrickson, in his feature-length directorial debut, and stars Craig Sheffer, Nicholas Turturro, James Remar, and Doug Bradley. The film follows Joseph Thorne, a corrupt detective who discovers the Lemarchand's box at a crime scene, which results in his life gradually unraveling. The film was released on October 3, 2000.

== Plot ==
Joseph Thorne is a corrupt Denver police detective who regularly indulges in drug use and infidelity during the course of duty. At the scene of what appears to be a ritual murder, Thorne discovers a strange puzzle box, which he takes home in order to indulge his fascination with puzzles. After solving the box, Thorne begins to experience bizarre hallucinations, such as being seduced by a pair of mutilated women and being chased by a creature with no eyes or legs. Thorne also makes a connection between the murder and a killer known as "The Engineer", who is suspected of having kidnapped a child. Thorne goes in search of the Engineer, who in turn begins murdering Thorne's friends and associates, leaving behind one of the child's fingers at every crime scene.

While undergoing therapy for his hallucinations, Thorne's psychiatrist Dr. Paul Gregory reveals himself to be "Pinhead", the leader of a group of entities known as the Cenobites, who use the puzzle box as a portal between their realm and the mortal realm. Pinhead informs Thorne that he has in fact been in the Cenobites' realm since opening the box, where they have been subjecting him to psychological torture for the various cruelties he has inflicted on others: The Engineer is a manifestation of Thorne's own cruelty, while the child is a personification of Thorne's innocence, which he has slowly been killing through corruption, hedonism, and violence. As hooked chains appear and begin to ensnare Thorne, Pinhead informs him that he will be subjected to an eternity of torment for his sins.

== Cast ==
- Craig Sheffer as Detective Joseph Thorne
  - J. B. Gaynor as young Joseph Thorne
- Nicholas Turturro as Detective Tony Nenonen
- James Remar as Dr. Paul Gregory
- Doug Bradley as Pinhead
- Nicholas Sadler as Bernie
- Noelle Evans as Melanie Thorne
- Lindsay Taylor as Chloe Thorne
- Matt George as Leon Gaultier
- Michael Shamus Wiles as Mr. Parmagi
- Sasha Barrese as Daphne Sharp
- Kathryn Joosten as Mary Thorne
  - Jessica Elliot as Young Mary Thorne
- Carmen Argenziano as Captain

== Production ==
Clive Barker confirmed in an online appearance on AOL in 1996 after the American release of Hellraiser: Bloodline that Dimension Films intended to make a fifth installment in the Hellraiser series, while the film's screenwriter Peter Atkins claimed that there had been reshoots to leave room for at least two more sequels. One concept was a project called Hellraiser: Hellfire, a pitch by Stephen Jones and Michael Marshall Smith in which Kirsty Cotton (Ashley Laurence) would face a plot by a cult to unleash the Leviathan and the Cenobites into the real world, with a climax involving a large Lament Configuration enclosing London. The pitch was rejected due to budgetary concerns after the film opted to be released direct-to-video. Although Barker was briefly in negotiations to return as executive producer in 1999, he was ultimately dropped from the production due to creative disagreements with the studio and barred from providing any sort of assistance on the film. Bob and Harvey Weinstein ultimately commissioned a script by Paul Harris Boardman and Scott Derrickson. After giving Derrickson $10,000 to direct a single scene from the film, they hired him as the director. Doug Bradley has since claimed that Boardman's and Derrickson's script was originally not intended as a Hellraiser sequel and that it was rewritten to provide connections to the series. However, the claim is disputed by Derrickson, who has stated that the script was pitched as a Hellraiser sequel and was always meant to be one. A retrospective review of the film by Bloody Disgusting also dismissed claims about the script's origins as "rumors".

== Release ==
=== Home media ===
The film was released on VHS and DVD on October 3, 2000, by Buena Vista Home Entertainment. The film debuted on the Blu-ray format for the first time on May 15, 2011, in a double feature with its predecessor Hellraiser: Bloodline (1996) by Echo Bridge Entertainment.

== Reception ==
On the review aggregator website Rotten Tomatoes, 22% of 9 critics' reviews are positive, with an average rating of 3.3/10.

Calum Marsh of Esquire called the film "shockingly good" and said, "Inferno feels less like a Hellraiser movie than a follow-up to Jacob's Ladder (or maybe a predecessor to Silent Hill), floating dream-like through hallucinatory David Lynchian visions and downplaying plot in favor of the surreal". JoBlo.com's reviewer gave the film a seven out of ten rating, and also felt the film was not very similar to its predecessors, saying, "without a doubt the film's biggest flaw is calling itself Hellraiser". Alex DiVincenzo described the film as underrated in a review for Bloody Disgusting, and praised the films' "Lynchian surrealism" and "film noir" elements.

== Sequels ==
The film was followed by Hellraiser: Hellseeker in 2002, Hellraiser: Deader and Hellraiser: Hellworld in 2005, Hellraiser: Revelations in 2011, and Hellraiser: Judgment in 2018.
