= Cenobite (Hellraiser) =

Fictional beings in Clive Barker's works

Cenobites
- Hellraiser race
- The Cenobites in a promotional photo for Hellbound: Hellraiser II.
- First appearance: The Hellbound Heart
- Created by: Clive Barker

In-universe information
- Type: Former humans/Demons
- Leader: Pinhead

The Cenobites are fictional, extra-dimensional, and seemingly demonic beings who appear in the works of Clive Barker. Introduced in Barker's 1986 novella The Hellbound Heart, they also appear in its sequel novel The Scarlet Gospels, the Hellraiser films, and in Hellraiser comic books published (intermittently) between 1987 and 2017. In the 1987 novel Weaveworld, they are mentioned in passing as "The Surgeons". The Cenobites appear in prose stories authorised but not written by Clive Barker, such as the anthology Hellbound Hearts edited by Paul Kane and Marie O'Regan, the novella Hellraiser: The Toll (plotted by Barker and written by Mark Alan Miller), and the novel Sherlock Holmes and the Servants of Hell written by Paul Kane.

The most culturally significant of the Cenobites, as can be seen through promotional material released with the premiere of the third film in the series, was nameless in the original novella, but was then nicknamed "Pinhead" by the production crew and fans of the first Hellraiser movie. In The Scarlet Gospels, he was given the official name of "The Hell Priest" by Barker.

== Etymology ==
The word "cenobite" means a member of a religious order who lives in a monastic community. In the Hellraiser franchise, the term refers to a member of a masochistic religious community, who are referred to as "priests" of a cosmic being known as Leviathan.

== Attributes ==
The Hellbound Heart says the Cenobites are also known as "The Order of the Gash". Cenobites were once human, having transformed into their current state in their pursuit of gratification. Cenobites are so removed from their former humanity and so dedicated to exploring physical experience that they no longer distinguish between sensations of pleasure and pain. Humans who summon the Cenobites, either by accident or in hopes of experiencing pleasures unknown on Earth, are often taken to their home dimension and become "experiments" in discovering the limits of physical experience, resulting in torture for eternity.

The Cenobites vary in number, appearance, and motivations depending on the medium (film, comic book, etc.) in which they appear. The involvement of multiple parties in the production of Hellraiser films and comics (many eschewing the creative supervision of Clive Barker) has led to varying levels of consistency with respect to their philosophies and abilities; for instance, their powers were much reduced in the 1992 film Hellraiser III: Hell on Earth compared with the first two films. The original novella and first two films indicate they are morally ambiguous ("demons to some, angels to others") but later films and comics depict them as often malicious and taking delight in causing harm. The only constants are that they take the form of ritually mutilated people with varying degrees of human characteristics, and that they can only reach Earth's reality when summoned through a schism in time and space, which is opened and closed using a puzzle box known as the Lament Configuration or, as described in the original story, the Lemarchand Configuration.

== Concept and design ==
After being disappointed with the way his material had been treated by producers in Underworld, Barker wrote The Hellbound Heart as his first step in directing a film by himself. The book describes a group of sadomasochistic entities who live in an extra-dimensional realm, where they perform "experiments" on humans in extreme sexual experiences. Although antagonist Frank Cotton believes they will take the form of beautiful women, they appear instead as monsters:

Why then was he so distressed to set eyes upon them? Was it the scars that covered every inch of their bodies, the flesh cosmetically punctured and sliced and infibulated, then dusted down with ash? ... No women, no sighs. Only these sexless things, with their corrugated flesh.

Author David McWilliam notes that the Cenobites are described in more explicitly sexual terms in the book compared with their depictions in the film adaptations. The four Cenobites described in the book each present unique mutilations and modifications: one Cenobite has stitches through its eyelids and a system of chains with bells hooked into various parts of its body; another has a grid tattooed to its head with jewelled pins driven into its skull at the intersections; the eyes of yet another are swollen shut and its mouth heavily disfigured; finally, a female Cenobite has undergone elaborate scarification to her pubis. The fifth, lead Cenobite, referred to as "The Engineer", appears briefly in the book's climax as an average human being whose body glows with intense light when he travels between realms.

After securing funding for a motion picture adaptation in early 1986, Barker and his producer Chris Figg assembled a team to design the cenobites. Among the team was Bob Keen and Geoff Portass at Image Animation and Jane Wildgoose, a costume designer who was requested to make a series of costumes for four or five "super-butchers" while refining the scarification designs with Image Animation.

My notes say that he wanted "1. areas of revealed flesh where some kind of torture has, or is occurring. 2. something associated with butchery involved" and then here we have a very Clive turn of phrase, I've written down, "repulsive glamour". And the other notes that I made about what he wanted was that they should be "magnificent super-butchers". There would be one or two of them with some "hangers on" as he put it, and that there would be four or five altogether.

— Jane Wildgoose on Resurrection, Documentary on the Anchor Bay Hellraiser DVD, 2000

Barker drew inspiration for the Cenobite designs from punk fashion, Catholicism, and by the visits he made to BDSM clubs in New York City and Amsterdam. Each of the four primary Cenobites from The Hellbound Heart were featured in the film, with appearances based upon their descriptions in the book. The first Cenobite became Butterball, the second Pinhead, the third Chatterer, and the fourth The Female. The Engineer was drastically altered for the film, taking the form of a giant creature with characteristics of different predatory animals.

=== In written works ===
- The Hellbound Heart (1986) – The original novella, introducing the Cenobites and the Lemarchand Configuration puzzle box. Though a few Cenobites are described, only one called the Engineer is named. One Cenobite is described as having a grid pattern tattooed on its head, with a jewelled pin driven in at each intersection. This story's character, Kirsty Singer, is later adapted into the protagonist Kirsty Cotton in multiple Hellraiser films and comics.
- Hellbound Hearts (2009) – An authorised anthology featuring other creators telling their own stories featuring the Cenobites, edited by Paul Kane and Marie O'Regan. Includes works by Neil Gaiman, Dave McKean, Kelley Armstong, Mike Mignola, Steve Niles, Tim Lebbon, Christopher Golden, Conrad Williams, Nancy Holder, Sarah Langan, and Chaz Brenchley. The book includes a foreword by Clive Barker, an introduction by Stephen Jones who worked on the Hellraiser films, and an afterword by Doug Bradley who portrays Pinhead in the films.
- The Scarlet Gospels (2015) – A novel by Clive Barker wherein the "Pinhead" Cenobite is officially named the Hell Priest and encounters Harry D'Amour, the occult detective of several Barker prose stories and his film Lord of Illusions. The novel delves into the Hell Priest's role in Hell and his ultimate goals. The Cenobites are shown to reside in a monastery that overlooks Hell's capital city and are led by an Abbot until Pinhead kills them all.
- Sherlock Holmes and the Servants of Hell (2016) – An authorised novel written by Paul Kane, featuring Sherlock Holmes encountering the Cenobites and a man named Henri D'Amour.
- Hellraiser: The Toll (2018) – Plotted by Clive Barker (who also provided artwork) and written by Mark Alan Miller, this novella acts as a bridge between Hellraiser film and The Scarlet Gospels, though it is also intended to work as a standalone story. The novella brings back Kirsty from The Hellbound Heart and Hellraiser films and gives her the last name Cotton (as opposed to Singer as it is in the novella), as well as making her the daughter of Larry Cotton as in the film. The story reveals that the Hell Priest is also known to some as "the Cold Man".

=== Hellraiser films ===
In the second film Hellbound: Hellraiser II, written by Clive Barker, the home of the Cenobites is revealed as a labyrinth-like dimension (possibly a part of the Christian Hell or a different place that inspired some myths of Hell) ruled over by a demonic entity called Leviathan, the creator of Cenobites. The film has Kirsty Cotton remind Pinhead and his group of Cenobites of their human origins. This spiritually weakens them and they are then seemingly destroyed. Barker wanted the villain Julia, played by Claire Higgins in both the first and second film, to carry the series as its main antagonist, reducing the Cenobites to a background role. However, Higgins declined to return to the series and fans rallied around Pinhead, portrayed by Doug Bradley, as the break-out character and main villain/anti-hero of the series. Pinhead's nature and past are explored in Hellraiser III: Hell on Earth, where it is revealed he was not killed but simply had his human self freed, resulting in the Cenobite now existing without morality or restraint. The film ends with the human Elliott Spencer merging with Pinhead once more to stop the chaos and reintroduce restraint and a respect for rules into the Cenobite.

As the films continued, the stories were largely stand alone but Pinhead was a constant presence, though sometimes only briefly appearing. In The Ashgate Encyclopedia of Literary and Cinematic Monsters, David McWilliam writes that the Cenobites "provide continuity across the series, as the stories become increasingly stand-alone in nature".

=== Hellraiser comic book series ===
Following the success of Hellraiser and Hellbound: Hellraiser II, Epic Comics published a Hellraiser spin-off comic series lasting twenty issues from 1989 to 1992. The comics featured several short stories written by new writers and artists, with Clive Barker acting as a creative consultant.

In 2011, Boom! Studios began a new comic book series following the canon of the first three Hellraiser films. The initial premise is that Pinhead is now bored with his existence as a Cenobite and plots a way to return to mortality. The series also involves Kirsty Cotton and Barker's occult detective Harry D'Amour.

=== List of Notable Cenobites ===
- Pinhead/The Hell Priest
- The Female/Deepthroat
- Chatterer
- Butterball
- The Doctor/Philip Channard
- Dreamer
- Pistonhead
- Camerahead
- Barbie
- CD
- Angelique
- Siamese Twins
- Chatterer Beast
- Wire Twins
- Torso
- Stitch
- Bound
- Surgeon
- Little Sister
- The Auditor
- The Assessor
- The Gasp
- The Weeper
- The Asphyx
- The Masque
- The Mother

== See also ==
- The God Hand – group of antagonists directly inspired by the Cenobites
