= Pinhead (Hellraiser) =

Main antagonist in Hellraiser

- Hellraiser character
- Doug Bradley as Pinhead in Hellraiser III
- First appearance: The Hellbound Heart
- Created by: Clive Barker
- Portrayed by: Doug Bradley (1987–2005); Stephan Smith Collins (2011); Paul T. Taylor (2018); Jamie Clayton (2022)
- Voiced by: Fred Tatasciore (2011); Evie Dawnay (2018); Doug Bradley (2021, 2026)

In-universe information
- Full name: Elliot Spencer
- Aliases: Hell Priest; Lead Cenobite; The Pope of Hell; Dr. Paul Gregory; The Engineer; Cold Man
- Species: Cenobite
- Primary location: "The Labyrinth" / Hell
- Status: Alive (reboot); Deceased (original series)

Pinhead (also known as Lead Cenobite or the Hell Priest, among other names and titles) (Note: In the 2011 comic book series Hellraiser published by BOOM! Studios, Barker refers to the character as "the Priest". In that comic book series and the subsequent series Hellraiser: The Dark Watch, Cenobites refer to him as holding the title of "the Hell Priest" or "the Pontifex", making him "Hell's Pope". Nearly thirty years after The Hellbound Heart was published, Barker's 2015 novel The Scarlet Gospels cements the character's official title and rank is "the Hell Priest" and that he hates the nickname "Pinhead". In a later novella, Hellraiser: The Toll (which acts as a bridge between The Hellbound Heart and The Scarlet Gospels), the character is also known to some as the Cold Man.) is a fictional character and the main antagonist of the Hellraiser franchise. The character first appeared as an unnamed (and allegedly female) figure in the 1986 Clive Barker novella The Hellbound Heart. When Clive Barker adapted the novella into the 1987 film Hellraiser, he referred to the character in early drafts as "the Priest" but the final film gave no name (he is credited as "Lead Cenobite" and only has approximately eight minutes of screentime). The production and make-up crew nicknamed the character "Pinhead"—derived from his bald head studded with nails—and fans accepted the sobriquet, although Clive Barker himself purportedly despises the nickname. The name was then used in press materials, tie-in media, and on-screen in some of the film's sequels, despite Barker's dislike of the moniker.

Pinhead is one of the leaders of the Cenobites, said to be humans who were transformed into demonic creatures devoted to the practice of experimental sadomasochism. They exist in an extra-dimensional realm that is Hell or one of many versions of Hell that co-exist. Cenobites are usually only summoned to Earth through puzzle boxes, such as one called the LeMarchand Configuration (known as the Lament Configuration in the film series).

In The Hellbound Heart, Pinhead is described as an androgynous being with a feminine voice. In 1987's Hellraiser, the character is portrayed by English actor Doug Bradley, who went on to reprise the role in seven subsequent Hellraiser films. In Hellraiser: Revelations (2011), Pinhead is played by Stephan Smith Collins, with Fred Tatasciore providing the character's voice. In Hellraiser: Judgment (2018), he is played by Paul T. Taylor. In the 2022 film, the character is portrayed by Jamie Clayton.

In the Hellraiser film series, Pinhead was once British soldier Captain Elliot Spencer, who became disillusioned with life and humanity during his experiences during World War I, leading him to summon the Cenobites and join their ranks. In Barker's Hellraiser comics published by BOOM! Studios, it is implied that Spencer was not the first Hell Priest or Pontifex and that others will be recruited to fill the role if he ever leaves or is destroyed. Additionally, Barker's novel The Scarlet Gospels indicates that there is debate on whether there has always been one Hell Priest existing for many millennia, or if the title and nature of the Hell Priest has been adopted by many different humans-turned-Cenobite across the centuries.

The Hell Priest's nature, and the motivations of the Cenobites, vary depending on the story. The character's appearance in 1987's Hellraiser marked a significant departure from the standard 1980s depiction of horror film villains, who tended to either be completely mute, or provide glib commentary while killing their victims. Instead, Pinhead was depicted as articulate and intelligent, speaking only when he deemed it necessary, capable of great evil but also bound by a personal code of honour (such as sparing the life of a young girl who summons him to Earth in Hellbound: Hellraiser II because he realises she acted as the pawn of another person). Barker drew influence from classical cinematic depictions of Count Dracula, in particular as portrayed by Christopher Lee.

== Development ==
According to Clive Barker and Doug Bradley, the earliest incarnation of Pinhead appeared in Hunters in the Snow, an original 1973 play directed by Barker, with Doug Bradley in the role of the Dutchman, an undead inquisitor, and torturer. A later film titled The Forbidden, which was shot in 16 millimetre and in black and white, included a prop in the form of a wooden block with six nails in it, which gave distorted shadow formations under different lighting angles. Years later, during the scripting of Hellraiser, the same design was applied to Pinhead's face to give the same effect.

After being disappointed with the way his material had been treated by the producers of the 1985 film Underworld, which Barker wrote (and which included a scene in which needles burst out of a character's skull), and then while working on the screenplay for Rawhead Rex (1986), Barker penned the 1986 novella The Hellbound Heart as his first step in directing a film on his own, introducing the Cenobites whom he also referred to as "sadomasochists from Hell". The following year, Barker adapted the novella into the first Hellraiser film, introducing the Cenobites to a wider audience. A Cenobite from the novella, described as having his head decorated by a gridwork pattern and jewelled pins, was depicted in the movie as having a similar appearance involving iron nails and operating as the apparent leader of his order of demons. Barker's sketches of the movie version of the character was different from the finished product, and had quills coming out of the top of his head, like Shuna Sassi in Nightbreed, but the budget wouldn't allow it. Instead the plan was to insert six-inch nails into his head. To find out where to put them, they used a drawing of a grid in a lifecast. Barker liked the symmetry of the pattern, so they kept it. But the nails felt crude and didn't feel right, and eventually it was decided to replace them with thin pins. The film credits him as "Lead Cenobite", but the make-up crew and production team referred to him as Pinhead, a name that was learned of and adopted by fans. The character is glibly referred to by the name "Pinhead" on-screen for the first time in Hellraiser III. The Pinhead name was used in press materials for the films and the various films to follow, as well as tie-in comic books published by Marvel Comics, including a crossover comic with Marshal Law, and a mini-series entitled Pinhead. Clive Barker did not care for the nickname, believing it did not suit the dignity of the villain.

During filming of the first Hellraiser film, actor Doug Bradley discussed the character with Clive Barker. Both agreed, as the novella indicated, that Pinhead was once human, though when he had lived and died was undecided. Bradley later concluded that while the Cenobites have been active for centuries, Pinhead was originally a person belonging to the 20th century, telling Fangoria: "To me, Pinhead is the chief Cenobite of the 20th century". This idea was expanded on in the second Hellraiser film, when the movie incarnation of Pinhead was said to have originally lived as a World War I officer named Elliot Spencer.

In comics published by Marvel during the 1990s, Barker plotted and oversaw many stories that followed the canon of the Hellraiser movies, starting with the comic series Hellraiser, and later including the spin-off titles Pinhead and The Harrowers. In Barker's later prose work, the Pinhead character did not appear again for some time, but the Cenobites were occasionally referenced as the "Surgeons" or the "Order of the Gash". In 2011, a new Hellraiser comic book series was published by Boom! Studios, plotted by Clive Barker, who co-wrote it with various authors. Within the series, only humans refer to the lead Cenobite by the nickname "Pinhead", while other Cenobites referred to him as "the Priest" or the "Hell Priest", describing him as Hell's closest approximation to the Pope. It is also indicated that this title and position is assumed by different Cenobites over the millennia because there must always be a Hell Priest or Priestess. In the follow-up 2013 comic book series Hellraiser: The Dark Watch, the title "Pontifex" is also used to describe the rank of Hell Priest or Priestess. The same series confirms that there are different versions of Hell co-existing, each ruled by a different leader, and that Leviathan and the Cenobites specifically target souls whose major sins involve the pursuit of pleasure, whereas other realms target different motivations (for example, the Hell dimension ruled by Abaddon harvests souls who were motivated by fury to sin).

Barker promised to give the character an official name in The Scarlet Gospels. In that novel, published in 2015, the character was given the official title and rank of "the Hell Priest". The narration stated the Hell Priest hates when humans referred to him by the nickname "Pinhead". Rather than explicitly stating that the prose version of the Hell Priest is also Elliot Spencer, The Scarlet Gospels indicates there is debate among characters on whether the Hell Priest has been the same person/Cenobite for many centuries, possibly thousands of years, or if there have been several to hold that rank and assume that appearance, and the current one only died and became a Cenobite during the 20th century. The book states that there is evidence to support both ideas, but after he is turned, he becomes very frank and more informative to his "victims" than ever.

== Appearances ==
=== Literature ===
The novella The Hellbound Heart introduces the Cenobites as other-dimensional beings, priest-like figures known as the Order of the Gash, summoned via puzzle boxes by people who wish to explore the limits of physical experience. The Cenobites have pushed their self-experimentation to such a degree that they appear inhuman, demonic, and sexless. They are amoral creatures, seeing no real difference between pain and pleasure, prizing and hoarding the human souls they harvest. Their home dimension is vaguely implied to either be Hell or one of many dimensional realms that might be Hell or serve as the inspiration for stories of Hell. The protagonist Kirsty also wonders if other puzzle boxes might open doorways to Heavenly dimensions.

The Cenobites in The Hellbound Heart are unnamed, except for one who appears to be a leader, and is called the Engineer. One of the Cenobites is described as having jewelled pins and a grid pattern decorating its head.

Its voice, unlike that of its companion, was light and breathy-the voice of an excited girl. Every inch of its head had been tattooed with an intricate grid, and at every intersection of horizontal and vertical axes a jeweled pin driven through to the bone. Its tongue was similarly decorated.

— The Hellbound Heart, Clive Barker, ch. 1

The prose incarnation of the character next appears in Barker's The Scarlet Gospels (2015), now depicted not only as a Cenobite but also a leading figure of Hell. The narration says the jewelled pins in his head have blackened over the years, now resembling iron nails (giving him an appearance now more in line with the film franchise). The character is known as "the Hell Priest" in the novel, not a true name but an official title marking him as a powerful and high ranking authority in Hell. The novel mentions that some humans do refer to the Hell Priest as Pinhead, but that doing so in the demon's presence is to risk his anger. The same novel indicates there is debate among Earth's magicians as to whether this is the same Hell Priest who has existed for thousands of years or if he is a man who became a Cenobite during the 20th century, and is simply the latest of many to have Pinhead's appearance, power, and rank.

In 1998, Clive Barker stated that the novel would mark the death of Pinhead, and he hoped it would be definitive.

"One of the things I'm trying to do in the story with D'Amour and Pinhead is, I actually want to kind of make Pinhead feel fucked. I want people to make fools of him as he breathes his last and with no hope of resurrection. No sequels. I swear the way he's going – I have plotted this – the way he's going is so total, is so complete that the most optimistic film producer in Hollywood could never dream of resurrecting him! So I'm going to 'off' him, and I want the audience to say, 'Good'".

— Clive Barker on The Good, the Bad, and the Light in the Dark by Phil Stokes, at the Write On! talk at Everyman Theatre, Liverpool, 11 November 1998

The Scarlet Gospels novel established that, in events that happened long ago, Lucifer, the Biblical Devil who rules Hell, abandons his dominion. A thriving society of demons rises in his absence, with the Hell Priest becoming a powerful figure. Eventually deciding to conquer the realm for himself, the Hell Priest spends years secretly killing off rivals in Hell as well as many magic-users on Earth, securing their sources of magical knowledge and power. After attempting and failing to kill occult detective Harry D'Amour, the Hell Priest decides the detective will witness and chronicle his rise to power. He kidnaps D'Amour's friend, a blind medium named Norma Paine, as a hostage. The Hell Priest journeys to a forbidden part of Hell where Lucifer is said to reside, hoping to gain enlightenment from their encounter. Instead, he finds an armoured Lucifer in a crypt, dead by his own hand. The Hell Priest dons Lucifer's armour, increasing his own power but inadvertently resurrecting the Devil in the process. Lucifer mortally wounds the Hell Priest, who then rapes Norma Paine to death and blinds Harry before dying. The battle concluded, the Devil journeys to Earth. All of Hell is then destroyed by an unseen force, including the Hell Priest's remains.

The 2018 novella Hellraiser: The Toll, plotted by Barker and written by his assistant Mark Alan Miller, bridges the gap between The Hellbound Heart and The Scarlet Gospels. In the novella, the Hell Priest is also known as the Cold Man.

Captain Elliot Spencer, Pinhead's human incarnation from the film franchise, has a cameo appearance in the novel The Bloody Red Baron by Kim Newman, in which he is working as an agent of the Diogenes Club. Suffering from shell shock, Spencer is discharged from the army after hammering nails into his own skull. In his introduction to Newman's collection The Original Doctor Shade and Other Stories, author Neil Gaiman claims Kim Newman was part of a group of friends who inspired the depiction of the Cenobites.

=== Film ===
In the films, the character is first referred to as "Pinhead" onscreen in Hellraiser III: Hell on Earth, a nickname proposed by glib protagonist Joey Summerskill. In the film Hellworld, the Cenobites are believed to be fictional characters and so different people in the story refer to the lead Cenobite as Pinhead just as fans of the Hellraiser franchise often do. In the film Judgment, the name is used onscreen as a derogative term towards the Cenobite by an angel named Jophiel.

In Hellraiser (1987), directed and written by Clive Barker, Frank Cotton escapes from the Cenobites, slowly rebuilding his body from the flesh and blood of victims. He recruits his sister-in-law and secret lover Julia Cotton as an accomplice in these murders. Frank's niece and Julia's step-daughter Kirsty Cotton unintentionally summons the Cenobites, led by Pinhead who explains they are "demons to some, angels to others". Kirsty offers to lead the Cenobites to her uncle who had escaped them, and Pinhead agrees to spare her. After claiming not only Frank but also Julia, the Cenobites turn on Kirsty, but she uses the puzzle box to banish them back to their realm.

In Hellbound: Hellraiser II (1988), Clive Barker worked on the film's plot and acted as executive producer but did not direct or write. In the film, Pinhead and the Cenobites follow Leviathan, a god of chaos who rules over Hell, depicted as a great labyrinth filled with tortures. The Cenobites are summoned to Earth by Tiffany, a young mute savant girl, but Pinhead declares they will spare her since she was manipulated to open the box by Julia, who escaped them, and her new accomplice, the corrupt Dr. Channard. Kirsty realises the Cenobites have human origins and shows Pinhead a photograph of World War I British Army Captain Elliott Spencer, the man he once was. Pinhead regains his human memories, regaining his humanity; he and other Cenobites then fight against Channard. He smiles to Kirsty before being killed by Channard (now a Cenobite) and Julia, who are later defeated. Kirsty and Tiffany escape the labyrinth.

This film is the first to name the villain "Pinhead" in the credits. Clive Barker intended Pinhead and his entourage to die in this film, leaving Julia Cotton to become the villain of future Hellraiser stories, but the studio wanted to return Pinhead to his villainous roots in a sequel. Clive Barker did not work on the stories for the subsequent films.

In Hellraiser III: Hell on Earth (1992), it is revealed that the death of Spencer in the previous film means the death of Pinhead's restraint and moral code. A new incarnation of Pinhead manifests who engage in a random killing spree, transforming some victims into new Cenobites. Reporter Joey Summerskill discovers Elliott Spencer's soul in limbo. Spencer explains his experiences in World War I caused him to see humanity and life as corrupt, leading him to use the Lament Configuration to summon the Cenobites, eventually joining their ranks. With Summerskill's help, Spencer's spirit escapes Limbo and re-merges with Pinhead. Summerskill then uses the Lament Configuration to banish the restored Cenobite back to Hell.

In this film, Summerskill glibly refers to the villain as "Pinhead", marking the first time the Cenobite is called by this name onscreen.

In Hellraiser: Bloodline (1996), Pinhead allies with the demon princess Angelique, in order to force John Merchant (a descendant of the inventor LeMarchand who built the LeMarchand/Lament Configuration) to create an unsealable gateway to Hell. The future segments of the film reveal that Pinhead is finally destroyed in the year 2127 by Dr. Paul Merchant, another descendant, who uses a space station to complete the "Elysium Configuration", capable of closing Hell's gateway for good. Pinhead and other Cenobites are trapped inside it and permanently killed when the box blows up.

Bloodline was beset by numerous problems during production, leading the film's director to request his name be removed and credit given to Alan Smithee. The later films in the franchise were all direct release to home video or video on demand. In addition, those films are chronologically set between Hell on Earth and the third storyline of Bloodline.

In Hellraiser: Inferno (2000), Pinhead appears primarily under the guise of police psychiatrist Doctor Paul Gregory, assuming his true form near the end to inform protagonist Detective Joseph Thorne that he has been in Hell for the duration of the film, and is being punished for his corruption and various misdeeds in life.

In Hellraiser: Hellseeker (2002), Pinhead serves a role similar to the one he fulfilled in Inferno. Kirsty is now married to Trevor Gooden, a corrupt insurance agent who plots to have her killed in a murder-for-money scheme, using LeMarchand's box to "cleanly" kill Kirsty without the evidence pointing to himself, his mistress, or his conspirators. Pinhead appears at the end of the film to inform Trevor, who had amnesia throughout the film, that he has actually been dead and trapped by the Cenobites for some time; Pinhead had appeared to Kirsty, pleased at the prospect of a "reunion", but Kirsty ultimately struck a deal with him: she would be left alone in exchange for killing Trevor and his conspirators, thus giving the Cenobites the victims' souls.

In Hellraiser: Deader (2005), Pinhead appears several times to reporter Amy Klein after she tinkers with the box, a central relic of a cult she is investigating. After Amy is captured by the group's leader, Winter, she learns he is a descendant of puzzle creator Phillip LeMarchand, and believes that it is his birthright to control the box and, thereby, the Cenobites. However, neither he nor any of his followers have been able to open it. Amy successfully opens the box, but rather than submit to Winter, Pinhead instead kills him and his followers for attempting to control it. Subject to being taken to the Cenobite realm for having opened the box, Amy instead chooses to commit suicide.

In Hellraiser: Hellworld (2005), Pinhead and the Cenobites are horror film characters and have become the basis for a successful MMORPG called Hellworld. The game seems to come to life as Pinhead attacks the guests at a Hellraiser-themed party, but this is revealed to be the hallucination of five guests who have been drugged and buried alive by the party's host, who blames them for not preventing the suicide of his son, a Hellworld-obsessed fan. In the film's climax, the host discovers that the Hellraiser stories are based on fact, and his son came into possession of a real LeMarchand box. Opening it, the host is greeted by Pinhead, who praises his son's ingenuity before ordering a pair of Cenobites to kill him.

In Hellraiser: Revelations (2011), Pinhead is physically portrayed by Stephan Smith Collins and voiced by Fred Tatasciore. In the film, Pinhead is involved in the affair regarding Nico, Steven and Emma, each of them opening puzzle box. Nico is captured by Cenobites and tries to escape, while begging Steven to help him. Nico kills Steven after the latter refuses to help him further and Steven contacts Cenobites to get revenge on him. When Nico comes to kill both families, Emma uses puzzle box to summon Cenobites. After discovering more details about family's relationships and their affairs, Pinhead decides to take Nico for further experiments, but Nico is killed by Emma's father and instead decides to take Emma's mother to their realm.

In Hellraiser: Judgment (2018), Pinhead is portrayed by Paul T. Taylor. In the film, Pinhead eviscerates the angel Jophiel after manipulating events to cause the death of a serial murderer who is integral to God's plan to instill fear into sinners. Pinhead is punished by being expelled from Hell and sent to earth as a mortal man, crying out in longing for his revered state of eternal agony.

In Hellraiser (2022), a reboot of the series, Pinhead is portrayed by Jamie Clayton. In the film, Pinhead leads the other Cenobites after Riley and other humans progress through the configurations of the Lament Configuration.

=== Comics ===
Cover of Pinhead #1 (Dec. 1991), art by Jim Sanders III.

Published by Marvel Comics' Epic Comics imprint in the 1990s, the original Hellraiser comics follow the canon of the movies rather than Barker's original novella, referring to the lead Cenobite as Pinhead. A spin-off miniseries was entitled Pinhead. In these comics, Pinhead is depicted as the latest incarnation of the cenobite spirit Xipe Totec, an entity derived from Aztec mythology. In the storytline "The Harrowing", Pinhead is revealed to have been romantically involved with a cenobite named Merkova, who was killed by the disciples of Morte Mamme, the sister and rival of Leviathan. Morte Mamme then selects a group of humans to act in opposition to the Cenobites, calling them the Harrowers. The team stars in the spin-off comic Clive Barker's The Harrowers, which ran for six issues from 1993–1994. In the Pinhead/Marshal Law crossover, it is revealed that Pinhead's human incarnation, Captain Spencer, took part in the Battle of the Somme.

In 2011, Barker began writing a series of Hellraiser comics for BOOM! Studios. These comics followed the canon of the first three films, taking place sometime after the events of the third. Starting with issue #2, the series refers to the character as "the Priest" rather than Pinhead. Reunited in Hell with his Cenobite entourage from the first two films (referred to in the comic series as his personal "Cenobium"), the Priest is still haunted by his full memories and now sees only futility in his existence, longing to explore new experiences and interests. He declares he wants to permanently return to his human form and seek spiritual salvation, then sends anonymous clues to Kirsty Cotton as to the locations of Earth's remaining LeMarchand puzzles. Kirsty summons the Priest, who betrays his Cenobium. Bargaining with Kirsty, she has her take his place so he can return to humanity. Kirsty becomes a Cenobite called "the Priestess" who resembles Pinhead but wearing a white robe and, unlike most Cenobites, is allowed to retain her memories and personality. A year later, Elliott Spencer appears on Earth, human once again and no longer fully remembering his existence as a Cenobite. Kirsty's friend and surrogate daughter Tiffany recruits Spencer into the Harrowers, humans who oppose the Cenobites and hunt down Lamarchand puzzles. Later, Kirsty arranges for Spencer's memories to be restored. Spencer then allies with another demon lord in order to attain new power and fulfill his true mission, to unleash damned souls on Earth, conquer humanity, and replace Leviathan. During this battle, occult detective Harry D'Amour attempts to help the US government stop the chaos, guided by his psychic friend Norma Paine and Spencer's former lieutenant, the Cenobite known as the Female. He and Kirsty learn of Spencer's corrupt behaviour before World War I, his desire to sleep with his own daughter Danielle, and that his final test to become a Cenobite involved fathering a child Priscilla with his daughter. Together, they defeat Spencer's bid for god-like power.

The Hellraiser series ended with issue #20, and the finale featured Spencer being defeated and then imprisoned alongside Kirsty within a "memory sphere" in Leviathan's realm. The series was followed by the 2013 limited comic book series Hellraiser: The Dark Watch, which begins one year later and reveals that Harry D'Amour became the Hell Priest or Pontifex following Kirsty's imprisonment, adopting an appearance similar to Pinhead but retaining his memories and personality because Leviathan saw him as more useful that way. D'Amour considers that the Cenobites, being human converts, are different in nature and motivation to the purebred demons he has met before (in the short story "The Last Illusion"). He confirms that while Leviathan and his Cenobites punish those who sin for the sake of pleasure, other realms of Hell have different demon orders that target other sins. D'Amour's ally Tiffany frees Kirsty and Spencer from imprisonment, later becoming a Cenobite as well. Elliott Spencer joins Abaddon's realm (which punishes the sins born of fury) and helps lead an army of the damned against Leviathan's Cenobite forces, with the hopes of then using the army to conquer Earth. After Abaddon's forces are stopped, Leviathan makes a deal with Kirsty and Spencer each in order to end their conflicts. Kirsty has humanity restored to herself, D'Amour and Tiffany, while her dead lover Edgar is restored to life. Elliott Spencer once again becomes the Hell Priest, but now with greater power and authority. He then kills Edgar and says goodbye to Kirsty.

Other tales of the Cenobites and Spencer as the Hell Priest are presented in the BOOM! Studios anthology comic book mini-series Hellraiser: The Beastiary (2015). The BOOM! Studios mini-series Hellraiser: The Road Below (2014) reveals Kirsty's first solo mission as the "new Pinhead" following her transformation into a Cenobite.

=== Video games ===
In 2015, Pinhead appeared in the action-adventure game Terraria as an enemy in the game's Solar Eclipse event, in which he has been renamed to "Nailhead" and possesses the ability to launch nails at the player.

In September 2021, Pinhead became a playable character in the online multiplayer horror game Dead by Daylight, alongside a purchasable Chatterer cosmetic. Doug Bradley reprised the role of Pinhead for the game. Due to licensing issues, all Hellraiser content was removed on April 4, 2025. Pinhead and Chatterer remained available only to players who purchased them before this date.

Pinhead appears as an overarching antagonist in the first-person survival horror game Clive Barker's Hellraiser: Revival, with Doug Bradley reprising the role.

== Character design and portrayal ==
=== Design ===
[Pinhead] was basically Clive's design, as seen on the Hellbound T-shirts. There was a lot of discussion with Clive, then I did a few drawings. First we just had spikes coming out of his head. I wanted it to be more geometrical. Originally he had pins all over the head, but Clive and I thought it would be nice to make it look more like a mask with pins around his chin, over his ears, and at the back of his head. We modelled it about six times and did loads of drawings. If you look at the first test pictures that came out of Hellraiser there are actually pins in there rather than nails and the pins got lost – you couldn't see them. So we clipped the ends of the pins off and made our own hollow brass nails that inserted over the top and they were much more visible.

— Games Without Frontiers by Brian J. Robb, Fear, No.6, May/June 1989.

An early Pinhead design by Clive Barker.

Barker drew inspiration for the cenobite designs from punk fashion, Catholicism, and by visits he made to S&M clubs in New York City and Amsterdam. For Pinhead specifically, Barker drew inspiration from African fetish sculptures. Initially, Barker intended Pinhead to have a navel piercing implying that the character had genital piercings. Barker's original "Hell Priest" sketches and concept art for Pinhead were eventually adapted into an officially licensed mask by Composite Effects, who released it in limited quantity to the public on 24 March 2017. This was done in celebration of the 30th anniversary of Hellraiser.

After securing funding in early 1986, Barker and his producer Chris Figg assembled a team to design the Cenobites. Among the team were Bob Keen and Geoff Portass at Image Animation and Jane Wildgoose, a costume designer who was requested to make a series of costumes for 4–5 "super-butchers" while refining the scarification designs with Image Animation. Rather than gold or jewelled pins, the character would have black iron nails decorating his head. In terms of lighting, Pinhead was designed so that shadows would swirl round his head. By July 1986, the shooting script positively identified the single pinheaded Cenobite from the earlier draft as clearly the leader.

The 2018 film Hellraiser: Judgment updated Pinhead's appearance from the previous films. As writer-director Gary J. Tunnicliffe explained: "This is a very no-nonsense Pinhead. No glib one-liners, he's a little leaner and a little meaner. We especially tried to incorporate this into the make-up and costume; the cuts are deeper, the pins a little longer, his eyes are completely black and the wardrobe is a little sleeker and more visceral. Someone on set described him as the 'bad ass' version of Pinhead". The flesh exposed on Pinhead's chest was redesigned as a rhombus in honour of Pinhead's master, the fictional character Leviathan.

In the 2022 Hellraiser remake, Pinhead's design retains the nails studded along a grid sliced into the character's head. The character also has fully black or bloodshot eyes, and the skin below the neck appears to be flayed in ornate patterns. Unlike previous designs of wearing black robes, the character is completely naked with the skin on the legs flayed away and hanging like the hems of a robe.

=== Physical portrayal ===
In the first eight Hellraiser films, Pinhead is portrayed by Doug Bradley. Because of his eventual skill at the application and removal of the Pinhead appliances and costume, Bradley has been credited in some of the Hellraiser films as an assistant make-up artist. When he read the script for the first time, Bradley stated on interview that he saw Pinhead as a cross between Oscar Wilde and Noël Coward. Upon asking Barker how he should play Pinhead, Barker told him to "[think] of him as a cross between an administrator and a surgeon who's responsible for running a hospital where there are no wards, only operating theaters. As well as being the man who wields the knife, he's the man who has to keep the timetable going." In the original novella, the character Frank believed the Cenobites may have once been human but that their extreme experiments on themselves left them demonic and sexless. In keeping with this, Barker and Bradley decided early on that Pinhead had once been a human being before joining the Cenobites:

A line from one of Clive's plays swam into my mind: 'I am in mourning for my humanity'. At this point, there was no back story for the character, but I had discussed this with Clive and we had agreed that he had once been human. But whether this was yesterday, last week, last year, ten, a hundred, a thousand years ago, I didn't know. I didn't need to. Sufficient to have that idea lodged into my brain. A perpetual, unconscious grieving for the man he had once been, for a life and a face he couldn't even remember. And a frozen grief. I felt now that Pinhead existed in an emotional limbo where neither pain nor pleasure could touch him. A pretty good definition of Hell for me.

— Hellraiser from chapter seventeen of Sacred Monsters: Behind the Mask of the Horror Actor by Doug Bradley, 1996

The Pinhead makeup took six hours to apply. When Bradley first donned the Pinhead makeup, he spent a few minutes alone in his room getting into character by looking at himself in the mirror. During rehearsals, Barker told Bradley, who at the time was more used to working in theatre, to subdue his movements and gestures, in order to give Pinhead an aura of complete control and to indicate he was confident enough to not feel the need to make threatening gestures or displays. New World Productions originally considered overdubbing Bradley's voice with that of an American actor, but this was reconsidered when the producers saw him perform.

Paul T. Taylor portrays Pinhead in Hellraiser: Judgment, an experience he describes as a dream-come-true. According to Taylor, "[Pinhead] was always my favorite horror icon because he was the most twisted and intelligent in my mind". The American actor used a faux-British accent when portraying the character due to his belief that "Pinhead has to be British". Gary Tunnicliffe gave Taylor room to create his own interpretation of Pinhead, as Taylor brought an intentional vulnerability to the role. In addition to prior knowledge, Taylor used Hellraiser comic books as preparation for the film.

In the 2022 film, Pinhead is played by Jamie Clayton. On the decision to cast Clayton, a trans woman, as the character, the film's director, David Bruckner, explained: "We felt a kind of anticipation around the fans to reimagine the character. We knew we wanted Pinhead to be a woman. Jamie was just the right person for the role. A person's identity can be really exciting for a role in many ways, but I have to emphasize that Jamie absolutely killed, that's how we got there".

=== Redesign for proposed remake ===
In the mid- to late-2000s, a Hellraiser remake was in development, and was to be produced by Dimension Films.

Pinhead redesign by Gary Tunnicliffe, as shown in Project Angel: Redesigning an Icon.

Gary Tunnicliffe, who was responsible for the Pinhead makeup in the last four films, improvised a new design for Pinhead called Project Angel: Recreating an Icon, the photos of which he published in Fangoria.

My design idea was to create something that still felt like Pinhead but that stepped away from the 'order' of the original design, something that was more painful, more chaotic. Several times over the years, Clive has approached me on various HELLRAISER sets and commented that the makeup looked very 'clean' and that it had lost some of 'the decay, the filth'. I decided to amp up the dirtiness of Pinhead's visage, make it more self-inflicted, bloodier and more brutal.

—

Among Tunnicliffe's redesigns included the usage of square shafted nails for the iconic pins, which were meant to look rusted and handmade. He also designed the new Pinhead as wearing a white priest's robe rather than the original black leather, as a homage to the origins of the word "cenobite" which implies a religious connection.

The redesign was criticised by Clive Barker as being too bloody:

I don't think that's right. I think the whole point about Pinhead is that he isn't bloody – that his victims are bloody but he isn't. The other thing is that there are these lacerations that are diagonal and very random. The original had the feel of geometry paper in school where it was broken up into segments and lines, which to me had a severity to it. Having the pins of the intersections of the crossroads made it have a surgical severity to it almost. I think this new version has sacrificed that feeling.

—

Pascal Laugier, who was set to write the remake, wrote an online statement in 2009, stressing that Tunnicliffe's redesign was unauthorised, and that he had a very different design in mind. That same year, Doug Bradley claimed that he was not approached to reprise the role of Pinhead in the remake, and said that "seeing someone else become Pinhead feels like a kick in the teeth".

== Characterization ==
In the film franchise, Pinhead's role has varied with each installment. In the script for the original film, Barker describes Pinhead and the other Cenobites as "demons" in his notes; the character, however, upon capturing Kirsty Cotton, describes himself and his fellow Cenobites as "explorers in the further regions of experience. Demons to some; angels to others". Hellbound: Hellraiser II expands the lore of the Cenobites, depicting them as denizens of Hell, here a maze-like dimension ruled by an entity called Leviathan. Here, the Cenobites subject their quarry to emotional and psychological torture. Hellraiser III: Hell on Earth portrayed Pinhead as a purely evil demon of chaos, a result of the loss of his human side in the previous film. In Hellraiser IV: Bloodline, he is presented as a megalomaniac bent on world domination; beginning in Hellraiser: Inferno he acts as a judge, punishing those who open the box for their sins and forcing them to face their personal demons. In Inferno, he uses the title "Engineer", a name derived from an apparent Cenobite leader in Clive Barker's original novella.

The first Hellraiser went into production during the height of the A Nightmare on Elm Street, Friday the 13th, and Halloween film series. According to Clive Barker, the popularity of these films led to producers and studios not caring for his intended portrayal of Pinhead as an articulate and intelligent character. Some suggested Pinhead should act more like Freddy Krueger and crack jokes, while others suggested he should be a silent character like Jason Voorhees and Michael Myers. Barker insisted Pinhead's personality should be more evocative of Christopher Lee's portrayal of Count Dracula: "Part of the chill of Dracula surely lies in the fact that he is very clearly and articulately aware of what he is doing – you feel that this is a penetrating intelligence – and I don't find dumb things terribly scary – I find intelligence scary, particularly twisted intelligence. It's one of the reasons why Hannibal Lecter is scary, isn't it? It's because you always feel that he's going to be three jumps ahead of you." Starting with Hell On Earth, Pinhead is more glib and also openly irreverent toward Christianity, imitating stigmata and remarking "not quite" when someone seeing him exclaims "Jesus Christ". In contrast to the first film where Pinhead seemed aloof about his nature, indicating he and his kind were "demons to some, angels to others", the fourth film Bloodline depicts him sneering as he asks, "Do I look like someone who cares what God thinks?" His glibness increases in later films, such as in Hellworld when a character believes the Cenobites are just a dream from which he must awake. After the Cenobites kill him, Pinhead asks, "How's that for a wake-up call?"

In Hellbound: Hellraiser II, Pinhead lacks any memory of his human past as Elliot Spencer, believing he has always been a Cenobite. Once Kirsty Cotton reminds him of his human past and recalls his former life, he transforms into a human appearance and is then vulnerable to an attack by Channard. Screenwriter Peter Atkins explained that Pinhead regaining Spencer's humanity left him "spiritually weakened" and thus vulnerable. As a result, the third film, Hell on Earth, depicts a new incarnation of Pinhead who lacks restraint and embraces chaos, wreaking havoc on Earth and indiscriminately killing humans he encounters. When Spencer's spirit willingly merges with him once again, the fusion regains Pinhead's previous sense of restraint and belief that he must follow the rules of his station. In the BOOM! Studios comics, it is said that Pinhead retains the memories of Elliot Spencer following the events of Hell On Earth, leading him to feel less satisfied and certain of his power and purpose, now desiring more than life as a Hell Priest in service to Leviathan.

In the original novella and first film, the Cenobites refuse to return to their dimension without a human soul, immediately targeting the person who opened the puzzle box. While Kirsty protests that she did not fully understand the box's nature, the Cenobites imply that desiring to open the box at all is enough to justify being taken and tortured by them. However, in Hellbound: Hellraiser II, Pinhead stops the Cenobites from targeting teenage girl Tiffany, who opened the box not out of curiosity or desire but because she had been manipulated to do so by Dr. Channard and Julia Cotton, both of whom wished to avoid the immediate consequences of accessing the Cenobites' realm. Pinhead justifies sparing Tiffany by saying: "It is not hands that call us. It is desire". In addition to his belief in rules, Pinhead can be reasoned and bargained with. In both Hellraiser and Hellraiser: Hellseeker, Kirsty Cotton offers other souls to Pinhead in exchange for her own (in particular, her human adversaries), and appeals to the villain's vanity and pride while doing so. In Hellraiser: Revelations, Pinhead is prepared to take Emma to the Cenobite realm, but reconsiders when other characters explain she was forced to open the puzzle box at gunpoint by her boyfriend Nico. He then agrees to let Emma go and takes Nico instead.

In Hellraiser IV: Bloodline, Pinhead is shown to prefer manipulating or coercing agents to achieve his goals, avoiding direct action until necessary. This brings him into conflict with the demon princess Angelique, who prefers to recruit agents through seduction rather than force. In Clive Barker's Hellraiser comics published by BOOM! Studios in 2011, which follow the canon of the first three films, Pinhead becomes disillusioned with his existence and is willing to destroy his fellow Cenobites and other demons of Hell if it means he can achieve his new goals of power. He takes a similar stance in The Scarlet Gospels, initially targeting human magic-users to acquire their power and secrets, and so they won't interfere with his plans.

Paul T. Taylor, who portrays Pinhead in Hellraiser: Judgment, described the character as "twisted and intelligent". Finding Pinhead's mannerisms and demeanor to be unique among horror icons, Taylor tried to capture that in his performance: "It's about the stillness. He's already so terrifying that when he makes a move, it means something. He's very economical and when he speaks, he's so eloquent." Taylor also incorporated the uncomfortable make-up and costume into his presentation of the sadomasochist, stating that "Pinhead's always in agony so he likes it. I feel like I was in character the whole time, and I don't mean that in some sort of artistic, lofty way. I mean I maintained the demeanor the whole time because I had to".

=== Origins ===
[Pinhead] was an English army officer in an unspecified place and time, though roughly in the Far East in the late [19]20s or early 30s. He was a very pukka Englishman, a public school type who went straight into the army. He felt terribly out of place and unfulfilled because he was only there through family tradition. So from his sterile viewpoint, what he hears of the Lament box is very appealing. I see him alone in his Nissen hut trying to solve the puzzle – which he obviously does, and is transformed into Pinhead. […] I don't see him as the first Cenobite. Of the four we know about, he is the leader, but the Cenobites have been around for centuries. To me, Pinhead is the chief Cenobite of the 20th century.

— Quoted from Doug Bradley in The Pride of Pinhead by Philip Nutman, Fangoria, No. 82, May 1989.

Doug Bradley as Captain Elliott Spencer in Hellraiser III: Hell on Earth.

The character's past, as alluded to in Hellbound, is expanded upon in the third film, Hell on Earth. It is revealed that Pinhead originated as Elliott Spencer, a captain in the British Expeditionary Force suffering from PTSD and survivor guilt. Spencer participated in the Battle of Passchendaele, after which he lost faith in humanity and God. He wandered Earth indulging in a nihilistic and hedonistic lifestyle to bury his trauma, turning to the baser methods of gratification and pleasure until finding the Lament Configuration in British India in 1921. Some time after summoning the Cenobites, he joined their ranks and became a powerful leader, though this experience caused him to forget his human life and conclude that he had always been a demonic force. When he is temporarily restored as a spirit in Limbo in the film Hellraiser III, Spencer refers to his Pinhead incarnation as "very persuasive and very inventive", while finding the incarnation of Pinhead that lacks humanity to be a terrible and abhorrent force of evil and suffering.

The BOOM! Studios comics, plotted by Clive Barker (and written by him and several other creators), follow the mythology of the first three Hellraiser films and expand it. The comics reveal that Spencer was a corrupt and at times sadistic person for many years before his experiences in World War I, that he abused his wife and enjoyed shocking his daughter Danielle with behaviour he saw as corrupt or provocative, such as dressing in women's underwear in front of her and having sex with her mother while she was in the room. Spencer came to sexually desire his daughter when she grew older, but believed acting on such desire would be an action too far. During World War I, Spencer saw a collection of dead bodies hanging from a tree and considered it to be beautiful and also confirmation that there was no order to the world. Desiring answers, he abandoned his duties and wandered. He eventually discovered a LeMarchand puzzle box and determined to learn more insight from the Cenobites. His high level of apathy towards degradation and pain interested Leviathan, who decided to make him the new Hell Priest. Leviathan tested Spencer by having him seduce his daughter Danielle, letting him live out his fantasy at last. Spencer believed this was an illusion, but in fact it happened, and Danielle then gave birth to a daughter Priscilla, whom she later abandoned.

=== Powers, weaknesses and limitations ===
Described by Doug Bradley as stronger than Jason Voorhees and Michael Myers, Pinhead is an extremely powerful being with supernatural abilities. His preferred method of attack is to summon hooks and chains that mutilate victims, often tearing them apart. These chains are subject to his total mental control, able to emerge from seemingly anywhere and move in any direction according to his will. The chains and hooks may even change shape after having attached to a victim. Pinhead is highly resilient to physical damage, resisting both gunshots and futuristic energy weapons. His magic can be used to summon objects out of thin air, teleport, cause explosions at a distance, and cast illusions. He is capable of converting other people into Cenobites, though this requires them to die in the process.

In order to act in the physical world, Pinhead needs to have been purposely summoned through the LeMarchand/Lament Configuration, which acts as a doorway to Hell (or one of many Hell dimensions). The comic books reveal that humans who lay down certain spells and magical seals can ensure a Cenobite has limited power and will not take them even if summoned. The film Hellbound: Hellraiser II showed that restoring a Cenobite's memories of their previous human existence can spiritually weaken them, restoring their humanity and making them vulnerable to attack. Once Pinhead was restored at the end of Hellraiser III, he retained his memories of having been Elliott Spencer, but was no longer vulnerable because of it, his full power and resistance to injury now restored. Likewise, the BOOM! Studios comic series featured two other Cenobites who took on the mantle of the Hell Priest when Pinhead was gone, each retaining their human memories and not becoming more vulnerable as a result.

Pinhead follows a code of rules. He does not kill or torture indiscriminately; he targets only those who open the Lament Configuration out of a desire to do so, or those who purposely get in the way of his goals. He spares the lives of Tiffany and Emma as they had been manipulated into opening the box by others who wanted to see it opened. He can also be bargained and reasoned with, as Kirsty Cotton was able to do on a few occasions.

In The Scarlet Gospels, the Hell Priest kills hundreds of the world's most powerful magicians and steals their magic and knowledge. He gains enough magical knowledge that he is able to massacre not only his fellow Cenobites, but some of the most powerful beings in all of Hell. He becomes powerful enough to travel to Earth without being summoned by the Lament Configuration, at the cost of not being able to summon his chains, though he gains a form of sanguimancy. Near the novel's climax he dons Lucifer's armour and is powerful enough to destroy entire armies with his chains; only Lucifer was powerful enough to stop him.

=== Cenobium ===
Pinhead is shown in all his appearances to be accompanied by other denizens of Hell, an entourage that is referred to in the BOOM! Studios comics as a "Cenobium". Although originally portrayed as a subordinate of "The Engineer" in The Hellbound Heart, his film incarnations show him as the leader of secondary Cenobite characters. In The Scarlet Gospels the Cenobites are led by an Abbott, called Lizard. The most consistent members of his Cenobium are a trio of Cenobites known as Butterball, The Female, and Chatterer. All three appear in the first two Hellraiser films, and the BOOM! Studios comic series. The Female and Butterball make appearances in the novel The Scarlet Gospels, while Chatterer appears in all but two of the Hellraiser films. In Hellraiser III: Hell on Earth and Hellraiser: Bloodline, Pinhead forcibly recruits several people to be new Cenobites, giving them characteristics evocative of their past lives or professions. Later films in the series depict Pinhead accompanied by new Cenobites of unknown origin.

In Hellraiser: Bloodline, Pinhead regards a demon named Angelique as an equal in the hierarchy of demons. Though initially reverent toward her, Pinhead is disillusioned when he sees she manipulates and recruits through seduction rather than pain and force.

"This is something entirely new for Pinhead; he's never had a demonic cohort, so to speak. He's had his other Cenobites in the previous films, but the pecking order was always pretty clear. Angelique is at least his equal, and certainly in Angelique's own mind possibly his superior. Pinhead doesn't quite see things that way, so their relationship is a little sparky".

— Doug Bradley on Hellraiser: Bloodline, US Press Kit, March 1996
