= Hellraiser: Deader =

2005 horror film

- Home video poster
- Directed by: Rick Bota
- Written by: Neal Marshall Stevens; Tim Day
- Based on: Characters by Clive Barker
- Produced by: Rob Schmidt; Stan Winston
- Starring: Kari Wuhrer; Paul Rhys; Simon Kunz; Doug Bradley
- Cinematography: Vivi Dragan Vasile
- Edited by: Anthony Adler
- Music by: Henning Lohner
- Production companies: Dimension Films; Stan Winston Productions; Neo Art & Logic
- Distributed by: Buena Vista Home Entertainment
- Release date: June 7, 2005
- Running time: 89 minutes
- Country: United States
- Language: English

Hellraiser: Deader (also known as Hellraiser VII: Deader) is a 2005 supernatural horror film and the seventh installment in the Hellraiser series. Directed by Rick Bota, the original script was written by Neal Marshall Stevens. As with Hellraiser: Hellseeker it began as an unrelated spec script, which was subsequently rewritten (by Tim Day) as a Hellraiser film. Like Inferno, series creator Clive Barker did not have an involvement in the production. The film stars Kari Wuhrer, Paul Rhys, Simon Kunz, and Doug Bradley.

Hellraiser: Deader was filmed in 2002. It saw only a handful of isolated preview screenings in the following years before finally being released straight to video in the United States on June 7, 2005. The film received generally negative reviews—particularly for Rick Bota's direction and its loose connection to the franchise—although some praised Wuhrer's performance and the gore, considering the movie an improvement over Hellseeker (2002), its immediate predecessor.

== Plot ==
Reporter Amy Klein is sent to Bucharest at the behest of her boss, Charles Richmond, to investigate a videotape depicting the ritualistic murder - and subsequent reanimation - of a member of a cult calling themselves "The Deaders". Amy tracks down the return address of the tape and discovers the corpse of its sender, Marla, holding the Lament Configuration. She returns to her hotel and opens the box, triggering an apparent dream in which she summons Pinhead. Amy delves into Bucharest's subculture and meets Joey, who warns her about the Deaders and notices that Amy has a 'self destructive thing'.

Amy pursues leads, ultimately tracking down Winter LeMarchand, the leader of the cult. Winter, as the descendant of Phillip LeMarchand, the toymaker who designed the puzzle box, believes he is destined to access the realm of the Cenobites and become their master. Unable to open the box himself, Winter believes that only an individual exhibiting trauma-induced nihilism can open the box. To this end, he founded the Deaders and attracted emotionally vulnerable followers so that he could kill them and reanimate them. Winter does this to Amy, resulting in her experiencing an extended waking dream in which she relives her father's physical and sexual abuse and her subsequent murder of him as a child.

Coming back to the living world, Amy successfully opens the box and summons the Cenobites. Pinhead expresses disdain for Winter and his family, denying that any mortal could ever control the Cenobites. He proceeds to slaughter the Deaders before indicating to Amy that she is now indebted to them by opening the box, saying that her father has been waiting for her in Hell. Rather than being taken, Amy kills herself, resulting in the box closing and sending out an electrical charge that banishes the Cenobites back to Hell and causes the Deaders' compound to explode. Later, Charles, unaware of Amy's whereabouts, assigns a new female journalist to investigate the tape. The film ends with a reporter holding up the puzzle box, which has been recovered from the destroyed compound.

== Cast ==
- Kari Wuhrer as Amy Klein
  - Maria Pintea as young Amy Klein
- Doug Bradley as Pinhead
- Paul Rhys as Winter LeMarchand
- Simon Kunz as Charles Richmond
- Marc Warren as Joey
- Georgina Rylance as Marla Chen
- Ionut Chermenski as Group Leader
- Hugh Jorgin as the arrogant reporter
- Linda Marlowe as Betty
- Madalina Constantin as Anna
- Ioana Abur as Katia
- Costi Barbulescu as the landlord
- Daniel Chirea as Mr. Klein
- Mike Jay Regan as Chatterer

== Production ==
In 2002, Dimension Films hired screenwriter Peter Briggs to write the seventh entry in the Hellraiser series after being impressed with his unmade script for Freddy vs. Jason. Briggs' script, entitled Hellraiser: Lament, set out to expand upon the first four films, ignoring Inferno and Hellseeker. Other potential subtitles considered were Jihad, Nemesis, and The New Order. Briggs' pitch was discarded for being too high budgeted, leading to the studio opting to retool Neil Marshall Stevens's spec script Deader, which was submitted to Dimension Films in 2000 during the production of his script Thirteen Ghosts and had been planned to be produced by Stan Winston. As in the final film, it entailed a newspaper reporter being sent to Romania to cover an underground cult who have discovered the secret of immortality and had gained contact with an otherworldly dimension, but did not feature connections to the Hellraiser series. Although Tim Day had wanted to write a direct sequel to Hellraiser: Hellseeker featuring a final conflict between Pinhead (Doug Bradley) and Kirsty Cotton (Ashley Laurence), Bob Weinstein directed him to rewrite Deader into a Hellraiser sequel similar in tone to the Japanese horror films Ring and Pulse. After a brief delay during the production of the 2006 American remake of Pulse, work on Deader resumed. Scott Derrickson was approached to direct but declined, and Rick Bota was rehired from the previous film. The film was originally rewritten to take place in London and later the Lower East Side of Manhattan before the producers opted to film it simultaneously with another Hellraiser sequel, titled Hellraiser: Hellworld in Romania, between October and December 2002, to save costs. Production was difficult due to the inability of the Americans in the cast and crew to understand the Romanian set workers and actors.

== Release ==
=== Home media ===
The film was released on DVD on June 7, 2005, by Buena Vista Home Entertainment. It debuted on the Blu-ray format for the first time on March 10, 2013, by Echo Bridge Entertainment. The disc is rare, as it has since gone out of print.

== Reception ==
On the review aggregator website Rotten Tomatoes, 13% of eight critics' reviews are positive, with an average rating of 3.6/10.

== Sequels ==
The film was followed by Hellraiser: Hellworld later in the year, Hellraiser: Revelations in 2011, and Hellraiser: Judgment in 2018.
