= Mark Alan Miller =

American writer and producer

Mark Alan Miller is a producer, publisher, and author known for his work in the horror genre, particularly the Hellraiser franchise and Clive Barker-owned properties. He is the founder and publisher of Encyclopocalypse Publications, an award-winning independent publishing company specializing in audiobooks and reissues of tie-in novelizations of horror and geere films. and is adjunct faculty at Woodbury University

== Career ==
Miller served as Vice President and Head of Development of Seraphim, Inc., Clive Barker's production company. Miller is also a writer, producer and director, having written for Boom! Studios and Dark Horse.

In 2017, Miller founded Encyclopocalypse Publications, a hybrid publishing and audiobook company that specializes in reprints of film novelizations and out-of-print horror novels, in addition to publishing new genre content.

Miller’s university biography states he ghostwrote the New York Times best-selling book The Scarlet Gospels, which is credited to Clive Barker.

== Credits ==
=== Filmography ===
Year	Title	Director	Writer	Producer	Notes
2011	Abarat: Absolute Midnight	x	x	x	Book Trailer
2011	Nightmare			x	
2014	The Nerdist Superego Video Shorts			x	5 episodes
2014	Nightbreed: The Directors Cut			x	Awarded vintage release at the 41st annual Saturn Awards
2015	Fun Size Horror: Volume Two	x		x	Segment "The Great Corben"
2016	Virus of the Dead	x	x	x	Segment "Preparation Meets Opportunity"
2017	Stan Lee's Lucky Man: The Bracelet Chronicles		x	x	Web Series for Sky TV
2019	Fun Size Horror: Shocktale Party	x	x	x	Segment "Jung Frankenstein"
2020	Clive Barker's Books of Blood			x	Hulu Original

=== Comic books ===
Year	Title	Studio	Notes
2011	Hellraiser	Boom! Studios	Based on the Hellraiser franchise by Clive Barker
2014	Next Testament	Boom! Studios	Written with Clive Barker
2015	Hellraiser: Bestiary	Boom! Studios	Based on the Hellraiser franchise by Clive Barker
2016	The Steam Man	Dark Horse	Based on the dime novel The Steam Man of the Prairies by Edward S. Ellis; cowritten by Joe R. Lansdale
2018	American Gothic Press Presents: Tales From the Ackermansion	American Gothic Press	Segmen "The Dump" based on the Joe R. Lansdale Short Story.
