= The Scarlet Gospels =

Novel by Clive Barker

- First edition (US)
- Author: Clive Barker
- Cover artist: Clive Barker
- Language: English
- Genre: Dark fantasy, horror
- Publisher: St. Martin's Press
- Publication date: 19 May 2015
- Publication place: United Kingdom
- Media type: Print (hardcover)
- Pages: 368
- Preceded by: The Hellbound Heart

The Scarlet Gospels is a 2015 horror novel by author Clive Barker which acts as a continuation to both his previous novella The Hellbound Heart (which introduced his popular Cenobite characters that then starred in the Hellraiser franchise) and his canon of Harry D'Amour stories. The book concerns the Hell Priest, the demonic Cenobite nicknamed "Pinhead", and his efforts to gain power. Occult detective Harry D'Amour must journey into Hell to rescue his friend and stop the Hell Priest's plans. The book was the first in which the Hell Priest was officially given a name by Clive Barker, who disliked the nickname "Pinhead" given to his character by others.

== Summary ==
The Hell Priest, a demonic Cenobite known to some of them as "Pinhead" (a nickname the Cenobite abhors), is murdering the world's magicians and stealing their magical knowledge. After years of this, the last remaining magicians gather to resurrect Ragowski, a member of their order killed by the Hell Priest three years before. Ragowski informs them the Priest is determined to obtain every source of magic known on Earth and is too powerful to be defeated by so few magicians. Their only hope of avoiding his fate, he says, is to simply give the Priest the location of all of their grimoires and talismans. The Hell Priest arrives, having been alerted by the spell that resurrected Ragowski. He degrades and massacres all of the magicians save for one, Felixson, whom he enslaves and turns into a Cenobite.

Occult detective Harry D'Amour travels to New Orleans, having been hired by a recently deceased magician (via a medium named Norma Paine) to destroy evidence of his occult activities before his family can discover them in his home. Harry learns the assignment is a lethal trap set by the Hell Priest, who sees the detective as a potential obstacle to completing his mission. Harry is rescued by Dale, a middle aged Southern man who experiences moments of precognition. Dale sends Harry back to New York City to attend to Norma. She tells Harry a monumental event is about to occur in the spirit world.

Harry enlists the help of his friend Caz to move Norma to a safe house operated by their mutual acquaintance, Lana. Joined by Dale, they attempt to transport Norma, only to witness the opening of a portal to Hell in Manhattan. The Priest emerges, absconds with Norma, and confirms a momentous event in Hell's history is about to occur. Harry's survival of his assassination attempt has convinced the Hell Priest that the detective is the perfect individual to write an account of the events.

Harry and his group — dubbed the Harrowers — discover Lucifer has disappeared from Hell and a thriving demon civilisation has arisen in his absence. The Priest has been using his accrued knowledge of magic to kill Hell's various ruling classes, including his fellow Cenobites, in order to eliminate any who might prevent his pilgrimage into a forbidden region of Hell called the Wastelands. The Harrowers follow the Priest into the Wastelands and discover a tribe of inbred demons willing to take them across a cursed lake to a tiny island in the center. The Priest and Norma have already secured passage to the island, where the Priest finds a cathedral rumoured to be Lucifer's throne room. He wishes to hold an audience with the Devil and experience a spiritual revelation.

The Harrowers and the Priest discover the cathedral is in fact Lucifer's tomb, erected after he had committed suicide due to being exiled from the presence of God. Enraged, the Priest strips Lucifer's body of its armour, dons it, and declares himself the new Lord of Hell. Armies led by Hell's surviving generals raid the cathedral but the Hell Priest, his power increased by Lucifer's armour, easily defeats many of them. The removal of the armour inadvertently causes Lucifer's resurrection. Enraged that he must once more endure existence without God, he engages the Priest in battle. After a vicious battle, Lucifer disembowels the Hell Priest and announces his intention to destroy Hell while he removes all the nails from the Hell Priest's head. The Harrowers, Norma, and surviving demons all flee the cathedral.

The desiccated remnants of the Hell Priest confront the Harrowers on the shores of the lake. The Priest blinds Harry and rapes Norma to death before escaping the lake. The Harrowers discover a wormhole that leads them to a desert road in Arizona. Meanwhile, Lucifer crushes all of Hell and its inhabitants beneath a collapsing stone sky, then travels to New York, resolving to make a name for himself. Angels from Heaven come to observe the ruins of Hell. Later, an unseen force eliminates Hell from existence, destroying the Hell Priest with it.

In New York, Harry — permanently blind and sinking into alcoholism — is contacted by Norma's ghost, who tells him she's gone on to Paradise. She now wants him to take her place as a medium who comforts the recently deceased and passes her power onto him. Taking up residence in her old office, Harry is overwhelmed by the sudden appearance of a throng of ghosts wanting his assistance. Seeing the ghost of a small child clinging to an older woman, Harry feels sympathy and compassion. He comforts the child and tells the pair they can trust him to help.

== Development ==
Clive Barker had no name for his Cenobite characters in the novella The Hellbound Heart, except for one called the Engineer. One of the Cenobites was described as having a head with a grid pattern and golden nails embedded in each vertex, each of which was decorated by a small jewel. When he adapted the story into the first Hellraiser film, Barker decided the Cenobite with nails in his head would act as the leader, referring to the character in early script drafts as "The Priest". The character was never named on-screen, however, and was simply referred to in the final credits as "Lead Cenobite". The film version had iron nails in his head rather than gold ones, and the production team nicknamed him "Pinhead.” Fans learned of the nickname and adopted it, and the film franchise referred to him by the same name on-screen in multiple films, starting with Hellraiser III. Barker said on different occasions he didn't care for the name, believing it was undignified for such a well-spoken and sophisticated villain. In The Scarlet Gospels, Barker finally gave the Pinhead character an official name: the Hell Priest. In The Scarlet Gospels, it is mentioned the nails may have once been golden but have now darkened, making their appearance in prose now resemble their appearance in the films. The second and third Hellraiser films indicate Pinhead was originally a human being who died soon after World War I. The Scarlet Gospels narration mentions that different characters in-universe debate whether the Hell Priest is an immortal being who has lived for thousands of years or if different humans have adopted his nature and appearance over the centuries, meaning the origin presented in the film could also be canon within the books or could be dismissed.

The novel had a long gestation period. Updates to the novel's progress appeared on Barker's website sporadically for over a decade, mostly related to the book's progressively swelling length; at one point, Barker predicted that his completed manuscript would reach 1,000–2,000 pages. Updates culminated in a June 2010 Twitter announcement that "the 243,000 words of The Scarlet Gospels merely lacks a publisher". Due to the length of the completed work, the book underwent heavy editing between 2010 and 2013; the novel was finished in September 2013, but no release date was revealed. A year later, the publisher St Martin's Press acquired the rights to publish The Scarlet Gospels and released it on 19 May 2015.

== Prequel ==
Hellraiser: The Toll is a 2018 horror novella written by Mark Alan Miller and published by Subterranean Press, from a story by Clive Barker. It serves as a sequel to the 1986 novella The Hellbound Heart and a prequel to The Scarlet Gospels, both written by Barker, set thirty years after the events of the former. It focuses on the returning Kirsty, as she once again comes face-to-face with the Hell Priest. Meanwhile, the Priest calls upon a first witness for his plan seen in The Scarlet Gospels.

The Toll evolved from the partially written short story Heaven's Reply by Clive Barker that had been in development dating back to 2010. At one point, Heaven's Reply was integrated into a screenplay for a Hellraiser reboot, which would have featured the creator of the Lament Configuration - the Frenchman Lemarchand - and would have opened in the fictional location of Devil's Island. The script was turned in to Dimension Films, but did not move forward. According to Barker, "that was the last anyone heard until news of a sequel surfaced". When Barker didn't know where to take the short story, it was suggested by his collaborators that the plot tie into the events of The Scarlet Gospels. After considering how to do it, Clive Barker's collaborator and author Mark Alan Miller reverse engineered the story into the novella Hellraiser: The Toll to be published by Subterranean Press. The novella received a limited release in February 2018, in two separate editions–a limited edition, with a quantity of 724 clothbound copies made available, and a lettered edition, with an availability of 26 leather-bound copies. It has since been reprinted by Encyclopocalypse in an edition which also includes three other short stories by Miller.

It was released in audiobook format on 6 November 2018, narrated by horror film director Tom Holland.
