= Hellraiser: Hellseeker =

2002 horror film

- Home video poster
- Directed by: Rick Bota
- Written by: Carl V. Dupré; Tim Day
- Based on: Characters by Clive Barker
- Produced by: Michael Leahy; Rob Schmidt
- Starring: Dean Winters; Ashley Laurence; Doug Bradley
- Cinematography: John Drake
- Edited by: Anthony Adler; Lisa Mozden
- Music by: Stephen Edwards
- Production company: Dimension Films
- Distributed by: Buena Vista Home Entertainment (United States); Alliance Atlantis (Canada)
- Release date: October 15, 2002
- Running time: 89 minutes
- Countries: United States; Canada
- Language: English

Hellraiser: Hellseeker (also known as Hellraiser VI: Hellseeker) is a 2002 supernatural horror film directed by Rick Bota and written by Carl V. Dupré and Tim Day. The sixth film in the Hellraiser series, it features the return of Kirsty Cotton, the heroine from Hellraiser and its sequel. The film stars Dean Winters, Ashley Laurence, and Doug Bradley.

The film was made in 2001 in Vancouver, British Columbia and released straight to video in the United States on October 15, 2002.

== Plot ==
Trevor Gooden survives a car accident that apparently killed his wife Kirsty Cotton when their car plunged off a bridge into the river below. Trevor manages to escape with his life, but even though police divers find both car doors open there is no sign of Kirsty.

One month later, Trevor wakes up in a hospital and realizes that Kirsty is missing, but because of a head injury his memory is uncertain and he cannot distinguish between fantasy and reality. Trevor finds himself the prime suspect in a murder case, and has numerous encounters with homicide detectives Givens and Mike Lange, though the two detectives never appear to be together at the same place. Many strange events befall him, including experiencing various hallucinations and several important events turning out to be just figments of his imagination. Trevor also witnesses his friend Bret commit suicide.

Eventually, Trevor is summoned to the police station and taken to the basement by Detective Lange in order to identify a body. There it is revealed that Givens and Lange are actually a single monstrous creature with two different heads. Trevor runs away from them and enters a morgue. Just as he is about to uncover a dead body on an operating table, the Cenobite Pinhead appears and reveals the truth: Kirsty is still alive. Trevor cheated on his wife with many other women and tried to get rid of Kirsty by making her reopen the Lament Configuration. She did, but before being taken away forever she made one last deal with Pinhead: five souls in exchange for hers. She killed three of Trevor's mistresses and his friend Bret, who was conspiring with him to kill her for her fortune.

Trevor is shocked at the revelation and takes the covers off the body on the operating table, believing it to be Kirsty, but sees it is in fact him. He is the fifth soul and this entire time he has been in Hell living in limbo. Trying to rediscover his past and piece his life back together was his punishment for his betrayal of Kirsty and his inability to accept who he truly was. It seems that Kirsty has pinned all of the murders on Trevor and shot him through the head while he was driving, leading him to crash the car into the river and making his death appear as a suicide. The film ends with Kirsty walking away from the crash with the Lament Configuration in her hand.

== Cast ==
- Ashley Laurence as Kirsty Cotton
- Doug Bradley as Pinhead / Merchant (as Charles Stead)
- Dean Winters as Trevor Gooden
- William S. Taylor as Detective Mike Lange
- Michael Rogers as Detective Givens
- Rachel Hayward as Dr. Allison Dormer
- Trevor White as Bret
- Sarah-Jane Redmond as Gwen Stevens
- Jody Thompson as Tawny
- Kaaren de Zilva as Sage
- Dale Wilson as Chief Surgeon / Surgeon Cenobite
- Ken Camroux as Dr. Ambrose
- Brenda McDonald as Angular Nurse

== Production ==
Writer Michael Lent gained attention for a spec script he had written and was invited by Bob and Harvey Weinstein to pitch on the fifth installment of the Hellraiser franchise. Lent's story The Hellseeker began with a fire at a remote radio station turned hacker laboratory. There is at least one survivor, a severely burned John Doe, later named Miller Rix. A game designer named Blink is also missing. Rix does not remember who he is, as he slowly recovers from his injuries. A fragment of a Cenobite claw embedded in his body, causes him to be haunted by horrific images as his memories are gradually restored. Rix hunts for his own identity; pursued by the police and the Cenobites, he has a chance to be new person or be caught by his past and the literal demons who seek to claim him. Blink returns and tells Miller about the Hellraiser game they had hacked into and his plan to release it globally. The script went through many drafts and Doug Aarniokoski was brought on as director, but he left to direct Highlander: Endgame. Several executives connected to the project at Miramax/Dimension had been fired, and the project was pushed back from fifth to potentially the sixth Hellraiser film. Lent completed his obligations, and offered to work something out if further drafts were needed but the project went silent. The next thing Lent heard about it was that a film titled Hellseeker was filming in Canada. Although the two projects had some similarities the film that was eventually produced was very different from what Lent had written, "everything that happens after the first eight or ten minutes was not anything that I would have ever envisioned".

After the relative success of Hellraiser: Inferno in 2000, Dimension Films hired Carl V. Dupré and Tim Day to write a sequel, and Rick Bota direct. At Bota's suggestion, the script was rewritten to include the 1987 first film's protagonist Kirsty Cotton, who had been absent from the series since a cameo appearance in the third film Hellraiser III: Hell on Earth (1992). Producers spent all of pre-production trying to speak with Ashley Laurence, but her agents wouldn’t give them her contact information. Deciding to move on, the character was rewritten but still kept the name "Kirsty" as an easter egg for fans. When Doug Bradley read the script and saw that there was a character named Kirsty, he was thrilled by the idea of reuniting with Laurence and offered to get in contact with her himself. She agreed to return, however at that point in production, there wasn't enough time for another rewrite of the script that would properly tie the original version of Kirsty back into the storyline Bota allowed Doug Bradley to rewrite the dialogue for Pinhead and Kirsty's reunion, which included references to the first 2 films. Though most of these lines were edited out, as Bota didn't want to confuse new viewers. Without the approval of Dimension executives, Bota gave a screening of the film's workprint to Clive Barker, who gave notes on how to improve the third act. It was the last time Barker had any involvement in the direct-to-video sequels.

== Release ==
=== Home media ===
The film was released on VHS and DVD on October 15, 2002, by Buena Vista Home Entertainment. The film debuted on the Blu-ray format for the first time on July 17, 2012, by Echo Bridge Entertainment.

== Critical reception ==
On the review aggregator website Rotten Tomatoes, 0% of 9 critics' reviews are positive, with an average rating of 3.8/10. Metacritic, which uses a weighted average, assigned the film a score of 46 out of 100, based on 4 critics, indicating "mixed or average" reviews.

Film Threat said it "rarely does it cross the mediocrity line from TV movie to feature film" and "all the cutbacks prove to make H6 neither interesting nor involving".

Richard Scheib of Moria stated how "Hellseeker would have worked much more effectively if it were not a Hellraiser film, one suspects", rated it two and a half stars out of five. Scot Weiber of eFilmCritic stated: "Though a marked improvement over its two immediate forefathers, Hellseeker suffers from the same maladies as the cheapies that came before: muddled storytelling, turgid pacing, unconvincing acting performances, and an overall sense of filmmakers simply not trying all that hard". He described the film's finale as being "culled directly from cult-fave Jacob's Ladder" and rated the movie one star out of five.

== Sequels ==
The film was followed by Hellraiser: Deader and Hellraiser: Hellworld in 2005, Hellraiser: Revelations in 2011, and Hellraiser: Judgment in 2018.
