= The Hellbound Heart =

1986 horror novella by Clive Barker

- 1991 HarperPaperbacks cover
- Author: Clive Barker
- Cover artist: Kirk Reinert
- Language: English
- Genre: Horror, Gothic fiction
- Published: November 1986, Dark Harvest, HarperPaperbacks
- Publication place: United Kingdom
- Media type: Print (hardcover), audiobook
- Pages: 186
- ISBN: 978-0-913165-13-3
- Followed by: The Scarlet Gospels

The Hellbound Heart is a horror novella by the British writer Clive Barker, first published in November 1986 by Dark Harvest in the third volume of its Night Visions anthology series. The story features a hedonist criminal acquiring a mystical puzzle box, the LeMarchand Configuration, which can be used to summon the Cenobites, demonic beings who do not distinguish between pain and pleasure.

Along with introducing Barker's Cenobites, the story was adapted into the 1987 film Hellraiser (written and directed by Barker), which itself became the basis for a franchise which now also includes comics and a video game. One Cenobite in particular, nameless in the original novella but nicknamed "Pinhead" by the production crew and fans, became a popular villain among horror fans. This character appeared in later Barker prose with the official names "the Hell Priest" and "the Cold Man".

The original novella was re-released as a standalone title by HarperPaperbacks in 1991, after the success of the first film, along with an audiobook recorded by Clive Barker and published by Simon & Schuster Audioworks in 1988. The story retains the gory, visceral style Barker introduced in his anthology series The Books of Blood.

== Synopsis ==
Frank Cotton is a hedonistic criminal selfishly devoted to sensual experience even if it harms others. Believing he has indulged in every pleasure the world can offer, Frank pursues rumours of the LeMarchand Configuration, a puzzle box said to open a "schism" or portal to an extradimensional realm of unfathomable pleasure ruled by beings called the Cenobites. In Düsseldorf, Frank obtains the box and returns with it to his deceased grandmother's home in England. Solving the box, he is confused and horrified when the Cenobites – horribly scarified creatures whose bodies have been modified to the point that they appear sexless and in constant pain – arrive. The Cenobites warn he cannot renege on their agreement once it is made, but Frank still eagerly accepts the offer of experiences he has never known before. With Frank as their newest "experiment", the Cenobites subject him to total sensory overload and he realises their devotion to sadomasochism is so extreme and their personalities so removed from humanity that they no longer differentiate between pain and pleasure and have no care to ever stop even if their subject no longer wishes the experience. Frank is taken to the Cenobite realm, a hellish dimension where he will be subjected to an eternity of torture.

Sometime later, Frank's brother, Rory, moves into the home in England with his wife Julia. Unknown to Rory, Julia had an affair with Frank a week before their wedding and has lusted after him since. While in the attic, Rory accidentally cuts his hand and bleeds on the spot where Frank was taken by the Cenobites. The blood, mixed with semen Frank had left on the floor before he was taken, opens a dimensional schism. Frank returns, his body now reduced to a desiccated corpse by the Cenobites' experiments. Julia later finds him and promises to restore his body so he can truly live and they can be together.

While Rory works, Julia seduces men at bars and brings them to the attic where she murders them. Frank feeds on their bodies, causing his own to slowly regenerate. Kirsty, a friend of Rory's who has romantic feelings for him, suspects Julia is having an affair. Rory suspects the same and while attempting to catch Julia in the act at his request, Kirsty encounters Frank, who attempts to kill her. Kirsty grabs the puzzle box, using it as a weapon before fleeing. She collapses on the street from exhaustion and wakes up in a hospital later. While waiting, she solves the box and inadvertently summons a Cenobite. It explains the box is called the LeMarchand Configuration and realises Kirsty summoned it by accident, but then remarks this does not matter. The Cenobite intends to take Kirsty now that it is here, but she then reveals Frank is alive on Earth again. Though skeptical that one of their experiments could have escaped, the Cenobite is intrigued. It agrees that if Kirsty leads them to Frank and he confirms his identity, they will take him back and perhaps leave her alone. The Cenobite seems to vanish and Kirsty returns to the house.

Cover of Night Visions 3 (1986).

Rory and Julia claim they killed Frank but Kirsty realises the man she is speaking to is Frank wearing Rory's skin. Another altercation ensues, during which Frank inadvertently kills Julia. Kirsty then baits Frank into admitting his true name out loud. The Cenobites appear, ensnare Frank and return him to their realm, telling Kirsty to leave. Downstairs, Kirsty sees Julia's disembodied head calling for help. The leader of the Cenobites, a being called the Engineer, then appears and seems to take away Julia as well before briefly bumping into Kirsty. After leaving the house, Kirsty realises the Engineer gave her the puzzle box to watch over until another seeks it out.

Looking at the box's surface, Kirsty imagines she sees Julia and Frank's faces but not Rory's. She wonders if there are other puzzles that may unlock doors to a paradise where Rory resides, but laments that she may never find one and that broken hearts might be puzzles that cannot be solved.

== Background ==
Barker worked as a hustler in the '70s, and his experiences made him want to tell a story about "good and evil in which sexuality was the connective tissue". The look of the cenobites was inspired by S&M clubs, such as an underground club called Cellblock 28 in New York, where people were getting pierced for fun. When he directed and wrote the film adaptation, Barker considered naming the film Sadomasochists from Hell.

He came up with the idea about LeMarchand's box because he did not want to resort to "drawing a circle on the floor with magical symbols around it" to get access to Hell, as it seemed like an old cliché. Instead he was inspired by a puzzle box his grandfather, a ship's cook, brought with him from the Far East, which he obsessed over as a kid.

== Film adaptations ==
The novella was adapted into the 1987 feature film Hellraiser, written and directed by Barker himself. Several changes were made for the film, most notably Rory being renamed to Larry, and Kirsty becoming his daughter from a previous marriage rather than a friend and co-worker who has a romantic crush on him. Credited as "Lead Cenobite", it also gives Pinhead a much more prominent role.

A sequel, Hellbound: Hellraiser II was released the following year which continues Kirsty and Julia's story, and also includes clips taken from the original film.

Eight other sequels and a reboot have since been released, and whilst most feature brand new stories and characters, they all feature the central idea of a puzzle box being used to summon the Cenobites, each time led by Pinhead.

== Audio adaptation ==
A full-cast audio adaptation of the novella was released in 2018, adapted by Paul Kane and produced by Bafflegab Productions. It starred Alice Lowe as Kirsty, Neve McIntosh as Julia, and Tom Meeten as both Frank and Rory. Other roles are played by Evie Dawnay, Chris Pavlo, Scott Brooksbank, Lisa Bowerman, as well as Nicholas Vince who portrayed Chatterer in the first two Hellraiser films.

Although minor changes are made to adapt the story to a different medium, the audio play is a much more faithful adaptation of the original novella, in which Rory and Kirsty remain friends rather than becoming family.

== Sequels ==
The novella received two direct sequels, The Scarlet Gospels written by Clive Barker and published in 2015, and Hellraiser: The Toll published in 2018, written by Mark Alan Miller from a story by Clive Barker. The Cenobites are also briefly mentioned in passing (as "the Surgeons") in Barker's 1987 novel Weaveworld.

The Scarlet Gospels features Pinhead, referred to as "The Hell Priest", and follows his attempt to rule Hell in Lucifer's absence. Through doing so he enlists Clive Barker's occult detective Harry D'Amour as his witness, who endeavours to stop him. Having previously appeared in several other stories, The Scarlet Gospels acts as a cross-over for a number of Barker's novels, novellas, and short stories.

The Toll was written to bridge the gap between The Hellbound Heart and The Scarlet Gospels, and shows how Kirsty was Pinhead's first choice of witness. It also refers to her as Kirsty Cotton, and other references to the events of The Hellbound Heart adopt the changes made in Hellraiser rather than those of the original novella.
