= Kirsty (Hellraiser) =

Fictional character

- Hellraiser character
- Ashley Laurence as Kirsty Cotton in Hellraiser (1987)
- First appearance: The Hellbound Heart
- Created by: Clive Barker
- Portrayed by: Ashley Laurence (Hellraiser film series); Alice Lowe (audio drama)

In-universe information
- Full name: Kirsty Cotton; Unknown (literature only)
- Species: Human; Cenobite (comics only)
- Gender: Female
- Family: Film series; Larry Cotton (father, deceased); Mrs. Cotton (mother, deceased)
- Spouse: Trevor Gooden (deceased)
- Relatives: Frank Cotton (paternal uncle, deceased); Julia Cotton (stepmother, unknown); Trevor Gooden (husband, deceased)
- Nationality: American
- Status: Alive

Kirsty is a fictional character from the Hellraiser media franchise. Created by writer Clive Barker, she first appeared in the 1986 novella The Hellbound Heart, which was later adapted into the 1987 film Hellraiser, written and directed by Barker himself.

The film made several changes to her character, most notably making her the daughter of Larry Cotton while in the novella (where Larry is named Rory) she is simply a friend of his. She also served as a major focus in its sequel Hellbound: Hellraiser II, had a cameo appearance in Hellraiser III: Hell on Earth and played a supporting role in Hellraiser VI: Hellseeker. In all of her appearances in the film series, she was portrayed by actress Ashley Laurence.

== Appearances ==
=== In literature ===
Referred to only as "Kirsty", she has an unrequited attraction to her married friend and colleague Rory Cotton. After helping him move into a house he inherited along with his brother Frank, Kirsty's investigation into whether Rory's wife Julia is having an affair leads her to discover she has in fact been murdering men in order to feed Frank and aid his escape from the hellish Cenobites.

She later appears in the 2018 short story Hellraiser: The Toll which bridges the gap between The Hellbound Heart and Barker's 2015 novel The Scarlet Gospels. Although pre-release material for The Toll initially listed her surname as "Singer", the short story instead included the changes to her character which featured in Hellraiser, including listing her full name as "Kirsty Cotton".

Kirsty also appears in Boom! Studios' Hellraiser comic series, set roughly twenty years after the events of the third film. By issue No. 8, she becomes a Cenobite herself, trading places with Pinhead who once again becomes human.

=== In film ===
Kirsty first appears in Hellraiser as the teenage daughter of Larry Cotton (Andrew Robinson) and stepdaughter of his second wife Julia Cotton (Clare Higgins). Kirsty moves with her parents to England to the house of her uncle Frank Cotton (Sean Chapman), who has disappeared sometime ago, but refuses to live with her parents, instead opting to live in a place of her own. When passing by her parents house one day, Kirsty sees Julia and a man enter the place and, believing Julia to be cheating on her father, follows the two inside and up to the attic of the house. It is there that Kirsty witnesses Julia attack the man and her uncle Frank, who is now a skinless entity needing to feast on the blood of others for nourishment, begin to eat him. When the man tries to escape, Frank chases after him and discovers Kirsty, whom he tries to attack, before stopping when she grabs the nearby Lemarchand's box. Realizing the puzzle box has some significance to Frank, Kirsty tosses it out a window, distracting him and allowing her to escape outside where she, after picking up the box, collapses. Found and taken to a hospital, Kirsty wakes up and, at first believing everything that has happened to be a dream, realizes she is wrong when a doctor hands her the box. Toying with the puzzle box, Kirsty solves and inadvertently summons the sadomasochistic demons known as the Cenobites and their leader, Pinhead (Doug Bradley). Kirsty bargains with the Cenobites, revealing to them that she knows where the escaped Frank is and offering them him instead of herself. After escaping from the hospital (presumably with the assistance of the Cenobites), she returns to her father's house and encounters Julia and her father, who claim Frank is dead and shows her his body. This turns out to be a ruse, as it is actually Larry who is dead, Frank having killed him and taken his skin to wear as a disguise. Trying to kill Kirsty when the Cenobites reappear, Frank accidentally stabs Julia to death and is in turn killed by the Cenobites with hooks. With Frank and Julia dealt with, the Cenobites turn their attention to Kirsty, who, while fleeing from them, stumbles upon Lemarchand's box which Julia's corpse is clutching and, using it, manages to banish the Cenobites back to their dimension. With the Cenobites gone, Kirsty attempts to destroy the puzzle box once and for all by burning it, but while in the midst of doing so, a man grabs it from the fire and transforms into a winged, skeletal creature before flying away.

In Hellbound: Hellraiser II, Kirsty is in the Channard Institute, a psychiatric hospital, after being traumatized by the events of Hellraiser. She tells the head doctor of the hospital, Dr. Philip Channard (Kenneth Cranham), and his assistant Kyle MacRae (William Hope), about her experiences with the Cenobites. Kirsty begs them to destroy the mattress that her stepmother died on, believing that it connects to the Cenobites realm. Dr. Channard is revealed to have been searching for Lemarchand's box for most of his life. He summons Julia from the mattress by having a mentally ill patient cut himself on it. As the patient sees bugs crawling all over his skin because he is hallucinating them and he uses a razor to cut them off of himself. He is bleeding so badly the blood awakens Julia and she eats him. Kirsty asks for Kyles' help in stopping whatever it is Channard plans to do. Going to Channard's house alongside Kyle, Kirsty plans to use the Lament Configuration to resurrect her father. Kyle is killed and eaten by Julia. Then Kirsty, Channard and another patient of Channard's (the seemingly-mute Tiffany (Imogen Boorman)) are taken to the Cenobites' realm. After an encounter between Julia and Frank, with the former killing the latter, Kirsty and Tiffany are attacked by the Cenobites. Before the Cenobites torture them, Kirsty reveals to Pinhead a picture of a man identical in appearance to him she found in Channard's office. Seeing the picture, Pinhead and the other Cenobites realize that they were once human, minutes before being killed by Channard, now a Cenobite himself. As Channard returns to his psychiatric institute and goes on a rampage, Kirsty has Tiffany re-solve the Lemarchand's box while she uses Julia's skin to disguise herself as her. Lured back to the Cenobites' realm, Channard tries to kill Tiffany, only to be fooled by the disguised Kirsty and be accidentally killed by Leviathan. With Channard dead, Kirsty and Tiffany manage to escape back to Earth using the puzzle box.

Kirsty makes a small cameo appearance in Hellraiser III: Hell on Earth in several videos taken from the Channard Institute that protagonist Joey Summerskill (Terry Farrell) watches to learn about the Cenobites.

Kirsty returns in the sixth installment of the Hellraiser series, Hellraiser: Hellseeker, where she has married a man named Trevor Gooden (Dean Winters), and supposedly died in a car crash, which Trevor has incurred amnesia from. Attempting to piece his life back together, Trevor's past is revealed to him by Pinhead, who tells Trevor that he repeatedly cheated on Kirsty and had conspired with a friend to kill her using Lemarchand's box. Trevor's plan backfired, as, after summoning Pinhead and the Cenobites, Kirsty proposed to give them five souls for her own. Pinhead reveals to Trevor that Kirsty had killed three of his mistresses and his friend, and that he is the fifth sacrifice. Trevor is in the Cenobites' realm, Kirsty shot him in the head while the two were driving, which caused the car accident. The film's final shot has Kirsty leaving a crime scene with Lermanchand's box, having escaped all conviction by framing Trevor for the murders she committed before killing him.

=== In audio ===
In 2018 Bafflegab Productions released an audio drama adaptation of The Hellbound Heart. It closely follows Clive Barker's original novella, and keeps the dynamic of Kirsty being Rory's (not Larry's) friend and colleague. She is portrayed by English actress Alice Lowe.

== Reception ==
In Divine Horror: Essays on the Cinematic Battle Between the Sacred and the Diabolical, Cynthia J. Miller and A. Bowdoin Van Riper note the differences between Kirsty and Julia:

"...in Hellraiser's portrayals of Kirsty and Julia as "light" and "dark" characters, respectively, embodying "a universal duality" that, in the Western world, is traditionally associated with good and evil, angels and demons".
"The actions of the two women become equally polarized as the film moves toward its climax. Julia emerges as a seductress who lures men to their deaths in order to harvest their blood and Kirsty as a virtuous "final girl" whose only goal is survival. The film then moves toward a final battle--a conclusion that is absent in the novella--between the forces of good and evil, in which Kirsty banishes the demons to Hell".

== See also ==
- Final girl
