= List of Comic Book Men episodes =

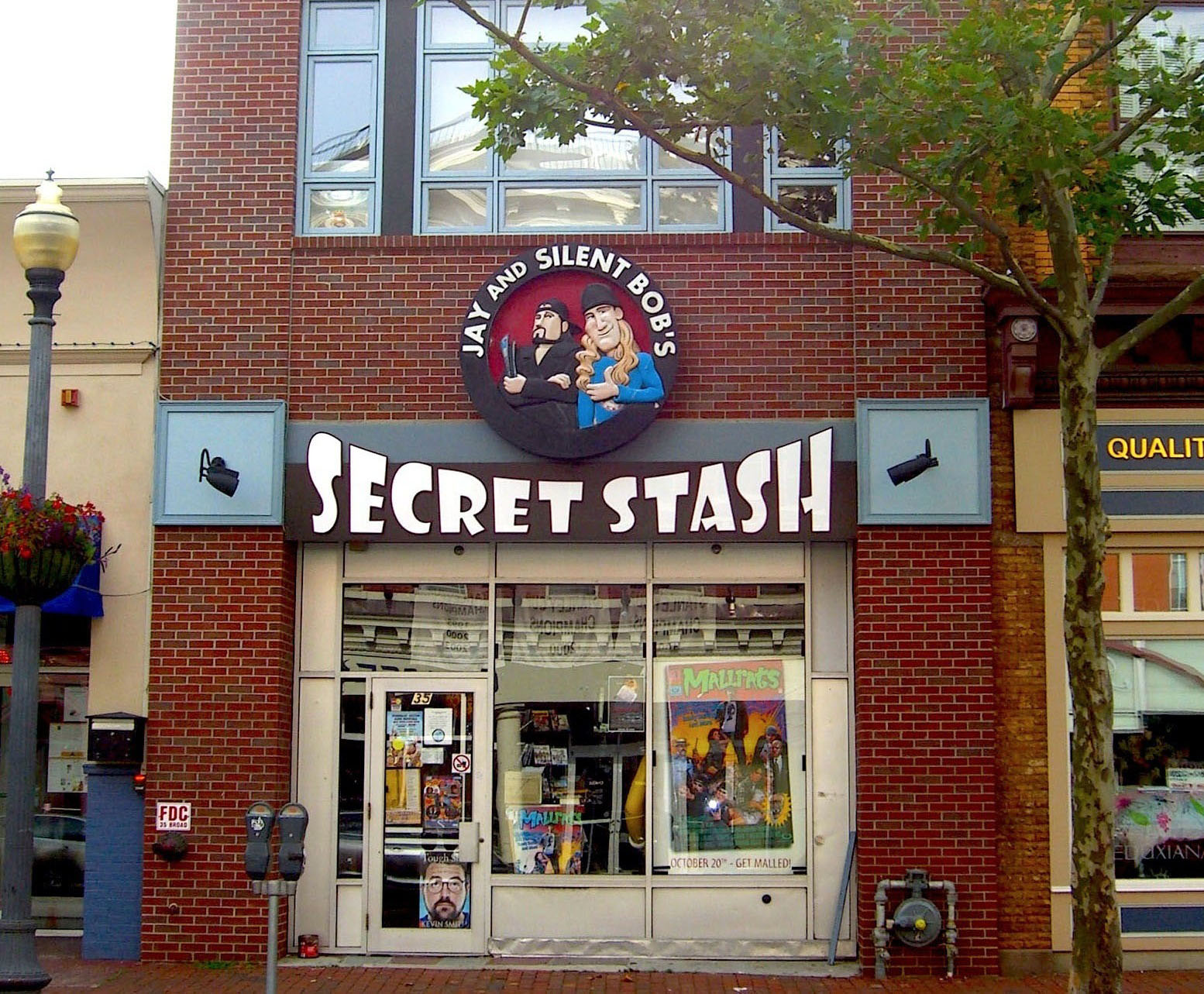
Comic Book Men is set inside Jay and Silent Bob's Secret Stash in Red Bank, New Jersey.

Comic Book Men is a reality television series on AMC that is set inside Kevin Smith's comic book shop, Jay and Silent Bob's Secret Stash, in Red Bank, New Jersey.

During the course of the series, 96 episodes of Comic Book Men aired over seven seasons, concluding on April 8, 2018.

== Series overview ==
Season	Episodes	Originally released	
Season	Episodes	First released	Last released
1	6	February 12, 2012	March 18, 2012
2	16	October 14, 2012	April 4, 2013
3	16	October 13, 2013	March 30, 2014
4	16	October 12, 2014	March 22, 2015
5	13	October 18, 2015	April 4, 2016
6	16	October 23, 2016	April 23, 2017
7	13	October 22, 2017	April 8, 2018

== Episodes ==
=== Season 1 (2012) ===
No. overall	No. in season	Title	Original release date	US viewers (millions)
1	1	"Junk"	February 12, 2012	1.963
Items appraised include a sketch of Batman drawn by Bob Kane; a "life-size" doll of Chucky from the Child's Play film series; a vintage figure of Steve Austin from The Six Million Dollar Man; and a set of Dawn of the Dead promotional lobby cards, prompting the staff to consult with the show's first expert guest, popculturist Rob Bruce. Also, Bryan Johnson, Ming Chen, and Mike Zapcic compete to sell off some of the shop's excess stock at the Collingwood Flea Market in Farmingdale, New Jersey.
2	2	"Life After Clerks"	February 19, 2012	1.438
Items appraised include a replica of the Batmobile from the 1966 TV series; a budding artist's self-published comic, a comics collection belonging to a would-be director hoping to finance his movie; and a lightsaber hilt prop whose authenticity is assessed by Star Wars expert Kevin Liell. Also, Kevin and the cast play a game of street hockey, and Jason Mewes visits the Stash for a day.
3	3	"Commercial"	February 26, 2012	1.261
Items appraised include a box of valuable comics brought in by a woman found by her garbage collector-husband; a stack of classic Fireside Books (some of the first trade paperback comic collections published); copies of the complete CGC-graded set of the 1984-85 miniseries Secret Wars; a collection of comics brought in by the owner's grandson potentially worth $750,000; and a collector's edition Transformers Megatron figurine. Also, Bryan directs the Secret Stash's first commercial.
4	4	"Zombies"	March 4, 2012	1.516
Items appraised include the shop's copies of comics featuring Wolverine and the X-Men that are sought by a young couple; a limited-edition Godzilla figure; a collection of Silver Age Marvel Comics; a set of Tortured Souls figures; and some of the original pages from a 1988 Silver Surfer graphic novel drawn by John Buscema that are brought in by Rob Bruce. Also, Walt reluctantly allows Ming to run a zombie-themed sales promotion.
5	5	"Con Gone Wrong"	March 11, 2012	1.744
Items appraised include an Avengers' 30th anniversary lithograph signed by George Pérez; a photocopy of the Punisher character's original concept sketch; a Barbie doll dressed as Halle Berry in the 2004 Catwoman movie; a "Ninja Claw" action figure connected to, but not featured in the 1985 Commando movie; a poster print said to portray a "gay Superman", and a replica Batman cowl created from the original costume designs for the 1966 TV series. Also, the cast head to a small fan convention at an Elks Lodge where, after a setback, they strike gold among trash.
6	6	"Ink"	March 18, 2012	1.354
Items appraised include a Green Lantern movie prop replica; a woman's collection of Barbie dolls dressed as classic super-heroines; a set of Target-exclusive Batman figures; and a collection of old books brought in by a young man. Also, Walt challenges the staff to get tattoos.

=== Season 2 (2012–13) ===
No. overall	No. in season	Title	Original release date	US viewers (millions)
7	1	"Stash Bashes"	October 14, 2012	0.995
Items appraised include a set of boxed Mego figures of Spider-Man, Mr. Mxyzptlk and the Human Torch; an oversized Darth Vader helmet used as a promotional toy store piece for Star Wars: Episode I – The Phantom Menace; and a rare boxed set of Internet-exclusive Legion of Super-Heroes figures that sold out in 20 minutes. Rob Bruce guest stars to appraise the Mego figures. Also, on Ming's suggestion, the staff tries holding a child's birthday party at the Stash, complete with Bryan as "Four-Color, the Comic Book Clown".
8	2	"My Big Fat Geek Wedding"	October 21, 2012	1.015
The men split into teams to see who can acquire the most valuable merchandise for the shop at a public auction, with the losing team forced to reenact the wedding of Reed Richards and Susan Storm of the Fantastic Four.
9	3	"Ghostbusting at the Stash"	October 28, 2012	0.999
Items appraised include a collection of four Thundercats action figures that are not in their original packaging; and a 1975 Star Trek Technical Manual and blueprints brought in by a woman whose ghost hunting exploits leads to a search of the store basement for spirits, and inspires the men to later go hunting on their own for the Jersey Devil.
10	4	"Ming in Charge"	November 4, 2012	0.893
Ming takes charge of the store when Walt and Mike's both call out sick, and receives some help from both Bryan and Brian O'Halloran, who guest-stars. Items appraised include the first issues of Iron Man and Daredevil; original Optimus Prime and Grimlock Transformers figures from 1984 and 1985, respectively; and a set of prototypes for Presidential Monsters figures for U.S. Presidents that include George Washington, Barack Obama and Mitt Romney, which are brought in by their creator.
11	5	"The Sidewalk Stash"	November 11, 2012	1.018
Items appraised include a case of Superman kryptonite pet rocks, along with a display poster for them, released during the height of the 1970s craze; high-grade, first edition copies of the original Teenage Mutant Ninja Turtles #1-4 from 1984 that are requested by a buyer; a copy of the 1978 Superman vs. Muhammad Ali treasury edition, which featured a boxing match between the two eponymous characters; and the complete, original Star Wars trilogy on LaserDisc. Also, to get rid of excess inventory, Ming suggests that the store have a table set up during the 58th Annual Red Bank Sidewalk Sale.
12	6	"The Running Dead"	November 18, 2012	0.834
Items appraised include a baseball autographed by cast members and guest stars of the 1966 Batman TV series, including Adam West, Burt Ward, Frank Gorshin, Burgess Meredith and Art Carney; an unopened box of Batman cereal produced in 1989 to tie into the Batman feature film; a copy of Sheena #2 (1942), that was given to the seller as a child by a counselor who mentored him; and a copy of House of Secrets #92 (July 1971), which features the first appearance of Swamp Thing. Also, Ming, Bryan and Mike decide to train for the 5 kilometer zombie run held by the Wayne Foundation to raise money to combat sex trafficking.
13	7	"Tough Sh*t"	November 25, 2012	0.963
Items appraised include a custom-made foam and latex costume of Mechani-Kong from the 1966 film King Kong Escapes, worn by the seller as he brings it into the store; concept artwork for the cover to Teenage Mutant Ninja Turtles #1 (1984) that was given to the seller by Turtles co-creator Kevin Eastman; the store's copies of Marvel Super Special #1 and #5 (1975) featuring Kiss that a buyer requests; and a 1975 Marvel World Playset, complete with the box. Also, Kevin holds a book signing at the store, with Jason Mewes providing security.
14	8	"Stan the Man"	December 2, 2012	1.18
Items appraised include a first printing copy of The Walking Dead #1 (October 2003) that exhibits some slight speckling on the cover; a copy of Hulk #6 (March 1963) which has a small stain on one of the interior pages; a copy of what a seller says is the Canadian edition of the Golden Age comic Planet Comics #1 (January 1940), but which turns out to be a 1947 reprint of Planet Comics #62. Also, Stan Lee visits the shop for a photo op.
15	9	"Clash at the Stash"	February 14, 2013	0.397
Items appraised include a Juggernaut statue by Randy Bowen; pair of Superman and Wonder Woman Underoos; and the store's copy of the seminal Green Lantern/Green Arrow (vol. 2) #76 (April 1970). Also, when retired UFC fighter Nate Quarry asks Walt if the store will carry Zombie Cage Fighter, an independent comic book co-written by him and Blair Butler that's partially inspired by Quarry's life, Walt has Quarry arrange an exhibition match between two fighters dressed as Jay and Silent Bob that the staff attend. Cameo by Jason Mewes.
16	10	"Super Hoagie"	February 21, 2013	0.305
Items appraised include a set of metal claws similar to those seen on the character Wolverine; a 2000 Flash of Two Worlds statue, that is based on the cover of Flash #123 (September 1961), which introduced the concept of the DC Multiverse; a copy of Amazing Fantasy #15 (August 1962), which features the first appearance of Spider-Man; and a 1994 Star Wars Chewbacca Model Kit. Also, the men divide into teams of two (Walt and Bryan versus Mike and Ming) to compete in a sandwich making contest to create a new sandwich at the local Readies sandwich shop that will be named after the store, the "Secret Stash Superhero".
17	11	"Stash-teroids"	February 28, 2013	0.282
Items appraised include an original 1979 Asteroids arcade video game that sat in a hoarder's home for 30 years; a collection of issues of The Amazing Spider-Man, including issue #121 (June 1973, which featured the seminal death of Gwen Stacy), #129 (February 1974, featuring the first appearance of the Punisher), #300 (which featured Spider-Man's first confrontation with Venom), and volume 2, #36 (December 2001, which commemorated the September 11 attacks); a collection of the original 12 1982 G.I. Joe action figures and a 1986 Cobra Night Raven 53P jet; and three Star Wars toy vehicles: a 2006 Hasbro Imperial shuttle, a 1995 Kenner Millennium Falcon and a 1999 Naboo Royal cruiser.
18	12	"Con Men"	March 7, 2013	0.420
Items appraised include a pair of animation cells from He-Man and the Masters of the Universe, one depicting He-Man and the other featuring Man-At-Arms, Orko, Stratos and Ram Man, but which is missing the overlay; the store's copy of Amazing Spider-Man #300 (May 1988), which features the first appearance of the villain Venom; A Star Trek II: The Wrath of Khan 12-inch Captain Kirk doll, signed by William Shatner; and a 1960s Superman poster re-creating the cover of Superman #13 (Nov/Dec 1941). Also, the staff hold an auction to sell the collection of Gary Conover, a friend of the Stash who has fallen on hard times. Stan Lee has a cameo.
19	13	"Stash Wars"	March 14, 2013	0.285
Items appraised include a custom Xbox 360 case and projector shaped like the Star Wars droid R2-Q5; a set of Garbage Pail Kids cards brought in by a seller who first bought them as a child; the first two issues of Deadpool Kills the Marvel Universe (October 2012); and a collection of Marvel Legends action figures, including one Marvel Icon figure of Wolverine.
20	14	"Cryptozoic Men"	March 21, 2013	0.595
Items appraised include a 70 lb., Millennium Falcon Extraordinaire prop that was hung in Toys R Us stores during the 1997 re-release of the original Star Wars trilogy, whose seller, Nooch Snoggins, won it in an auction sponsored by Rosie O'Donnell, and which requires two people to bring into the shop; the shop's 1977 Mattel Godzilla Shogun Warriors figure; and a copy of Creepy #1 (1964) signed Jim Warren and Frank Frazetta. Also, to improve flagging team chemistry at the shop Walt proposes to the other staff that they create their own comic book. After developing a horror concept called The Cryptozoic Man, Bryan suggests filming a video to accompany their pitch to Nick Barrucci of Dynamite Entertainment, which stars Ming in a Bigfoot costume and features an introduction by Stan Lee.
21	15	"Comic Charades"	March 28, 2013	0.632
Items appraised include a 2007 Takara reissue of the 1984 Transformers Megatron, which cannot be sold in the United States due to laws prohibiting the sale toy guns that realistic resemble real guns; a signed, 1975 pencil sketch of Namor by George Pérez; and the store's copy of Detective Comics #359 (January 1967), featuring the first appearance of Batgirl; and a 1967 Aurora model kit of the Bride of Frankenstein, and a 2000 Monsters Frightening 4-Pack, a Toys R Us exclusive combination reissue of the 1960s model kits for the Creature from the Black Lagoon, Dracula, Frankenstein's Monster and the Wolfman that was limited to 5,000, both of which are shown to the staff by a friend of Walt's named Monster Bill. The staff plays a game of comic book charades.
22	16	"Giant-Sized Anniversary"	April 4, 2013	0.420
Items appraised include a limited edition (#33 of 250) 3D shadow box recreating the cover of Batman #4 (Winter 1940); the shop's copy of Giant-Size X-Men #1 (May 1975, featuring the first appearance of Storm, Nightcrawler, and Colossus), which it won in an online auction, and signed by artist Dave Cockrum, which is sought by two different customers; and a production animation cell from the 1978 Ralph Bakshi film The Lord of the Rings showing Gandalf and Bilbo Baggins. Also, the men plan a special surprise to celebrate the 15-year anniversary of Walt's time at the shop.

=== Season 3 (2013–14) ===
No. overall	No. in season	Title	Original release date	US viewers (millions)
23	1	"The Incredible Bulk"	October 13, 2013	1.099
The guys are working at the store when Lou Ferrigno, star of The Incredible Hulk television series, enters looking for Bryan. Kevin Smith is considering hiring Lou to be his personal trainer, but, to find out how hardcore the training will be, he has hired Lou to train Bryan first. Meanwhile, Walt purchases Archie Comics #18 from a woman with a hidden Archie tattoo and sells a copy of Daredevil #168 to a customer looking to complete his collection of Frank Miller Daredevil comics.
24	2	"To The Bat Cave"	October 20, 2013	0.959
Batman superfan Chris Weir asks if the store has a Hot Toys Batman DX12 figure in stock. He wants the toy to add to his extensive Batman collection, which he reveals he keeps in a customized Batcave that he built in the basement of his home. While negotiating for the toy, he invites the guys to over to see his Batcave. Everyone but Mike, who has to attend a wedding, accepts. Arriving at the house, they are directed to enter and go to the basement, where they find a room filled with Batman collectibles. They are then directed to a bust of William Shakespeare, which flips open to reveal a red button, just like in the 1960s Batman television series. The button opens the door to a secret Batcave where Chris is waiting. The Batcave features faux cave walls, a full Batsuit, and a 120-inch movie screen.
25	3	"Super Friends"	October 27, 2013	1.109
Mike calculates the total value of the items from his collection that were lost to Hurricane Sandy flooding: $33,798. To help start a new collection, Walt considers replacing a Teen Titans poster by illustrator George Pérez that Mike says he will miss the most. However, Robert Bruce mentions he knows Pérez and offers to reach out to him. Later at Pérez's studio, Pérez agrees to create an original piece featuring Mike's favorite character of his, Wonder Man. Pérez and his wife Carol later present Mike with the artwork, as well as a trademark shirt which he autographs and gives to Walt to hang in the store.
26	4	"USS Ming"	November 3, 2013	1.088
A doctor brings in two G.I. Joe toys: the Cobra Terror Drome and the USS Flagg, a toy aircraft carrier that is one of the largest playsets ever made. The doctor wants to fund production of a set of flashcards which will teach doctors toxicology using comic book-style illustrations. Walt isn't interested in the toys, but Ming takes them to the back of the store. He and the doctor fully assemble the carrier. After considering buying both toys, Ming eventually purchases the USS Flagg for $550, plus an agreement to sell the doctor's flashcards at the store. Meanwhile, an autographed copy of Marvel's 9/11 tribute comic, which includes a poem by Kevin Smith, is brought into the store. After learning the proceeds will go to the Feel Good Foundation, a charity which helps injured firefighters, Walt immediately agrees to the initial asking price and then decides to pay even more.
27	5	"Pity the Fools"	November 10, 2013	N/A
A seller with a mohawk hairstyle wants to sell Mr. T's Water War, a 1983 backyard water toy. After its value is assessed, Walt purchases the toy. Ming later convinces Bryan and Mike to hook up a hose to the toy, put on their bathing suits and have a water fight in the store parking lot. Meanwhile, Walt declines to buy a nearly complete set of Marvel trading cards, which he and Kevin once collected. The cards now have no value, and the seller is sent away with some additional Marvel cards from the store for no charge. Walt also sells a Lady Death plaque to a woman dressed in a revealing Mera costume, who plans to give the plaque as a gift at a cosplay birthday party. Bryan asks to "chaperone" the party, and she accepts.
28	6	"Walt's Big Gamble"	November 17, 2013	0.919
Walt has an idea. After watching several television shows about bidding on repossessed storage units, he suggests the men go to a storage unit auction to look for collectibles. They agree to chip in $250 each, and Bryan finds an online listing for a storage unit auction happening that weekend. At the auction, a unit finally goes up for auction containing several storage boxes that Walt hopes are filled with comics. Robert Bruce also attends, and he and Walt get into a bidding war for the unit, which Walt wins with a bid of $1,550. With high hopes of recouping their investment, the guys nothing of value inside the unit.
29	7	"Dukes of Jersey"	November 24, 2013	0.881
A Dukes of Hazzard enthusiast wants to sell a box of memorabilia. Walt is only willing to pay $40 for the lot, but throws in an extra $10 in exchange for a ride in Tom's replica of the General Lee parked in front of the store. The guys take a ride in the car, which features series-correct details including a compound bow, a CB radio, road flares made to look like sticks of dynamite, and jugs for moonshine.
30	8	"Cryptozoic Launch"	December 1, 2013	1.064
The guys are excited by the delivery of several boxes of Issue 1 of Cryptozoic Man, a comic book written and illustrated by Walt and Bryan with cooperation from Mike and Ming. The comic centers on a character who is an amalgamation of a human being and legendary creatures like Bigfoot, the Loch Ness Monster and the Jersey Devil. The distributor, Dynamite Entertainment, has even created a special variant cover for the Baltimore Comic-Con, where the guys officially launch the book. At the Con, the guys have their own table to sign autographs for a long line of fans. Kevin Smith and Jason Mewes stop by, and a proud Kevin congratulates his friends.
31	9	"Superman's 75th"	February 9, 2014	1.074
Two customers search for Superman-related content; one is a woman in search of Lois Lane #106, the issue in which Lois turns into a black woman; the other is a man hoping to find a great Superman gift for his father's 75th birthday. At Walt's suggestion, the customer purchases a Chemtoy Superman figure. Coincidentally, Superman is also celebrating his 75th birthday, so Walt decides to throw a party for The Man of Steel at the store. He assigns Ming to decorations/invitations Mike to food, and mentions securing a secret celebrity guest. On the night of the party, Ming dresses as Jimmy Olsen, Mike as Bizarro, Walt as Jor-El, and Bryan as a piece of kryptonite. The special guest arrives — Dean Cain from Lois & Clark: The New Adventures of Superman. Cain greets guests, answers questions, and receives a gift card from the store.
32	10	"Uhura's Uhura"	February 16, 2014	1.083
Nichelle Nichols asks for a Mego figurine of Lt. Uhura from Star Trek. Walt promises to quickly find one. Ming heads out on a lead and later arrives with the action figure. Bryan pays for it if Nichols will reenact Uhura's famous kiss with Captain Kirk with him, and she does.
33	11	"Pinheads"	February 23, 2014	1.123
After purchasing a Batman bowling ball from a customer, Walt reminisces about he and Bryan once being on a bowling team. Ming mentions Brian O'Halloran and the cast members from Clerks having a bowling team. Walt suggests a match between the Clerks and the Stash. The Clerks team — O'Halloran, Jason Mewes, Scott Schiaffo and Ernie O'Donnell - take an early lead so Walt parlays his four roles in Clerks into a spot on the winning team. Without Walt, the Stash team makes a comeback, but the Clerks ultimately win.
34	12	"Trivia Chew-Off"	March 2, 2014	1.055
Walt challenges the men to a game of comic book trivia. Whoever gives an incorrect answer must chew an old gumball. The loser will be whoever taps out first, or whoever's answer Walt cannot understand because their mouth is full. After several rounds, Ming still has yet to give a correct answer and taps out.
35	13	"The Esposito Collection"	March 9, 2014	0.914
The nephew of Mike Esposito looks to sell some of his uncle's artwork, which is later valued collectively at over $3,000. An auction is suggested and Walt agrees to donate a portion to the Shore Relief Fund, a Hurricane Sandy relief charity. The auction brings in a total of $21,867.50.
36	14	"Batcycle on Broad"	March 16, 2014	1.247
Two men want to sell a replica of the Batcycle. Ming takes Walt for a ride with in the Robin sidecar, then Bryan drives Mike around. Another seller brings in The Amazing Spider-Man with The Fantastic Four board game and the guys play a quick game before Walt buys it. Walt passes on a Back to the Future license plate signed by Christopher Lloyd.
37	15	"Certified Guaranty"	March 23, 2014	1.214
A local kid brings in his father's comic collection, containing key Silver Age issues of The Amazing Spider-Man, The Fantastic Four and Captain America, some of which, if certified, could fetch $4,000-$5,000 apiece. Later, Walt buys a talking Turbo Man toy from Jingle All the Way, a set of Wayne Gretzky commemorative plates and a signed Gretzky figurine.
38	16	"Knights of the Stash"	March 30, 2014	1.111
Ming gets a call from Jason Mewes wants to get a group together to go to a Renaissance Fair. Ming convinces Bryan, Mike, and a reluctant Walt to go. At the fair, Jay gives an informal tour until they meet two men in full armor who recruit them for the "army." Outfitted in Medieval garb, they train at axe-throwing, target-practice, and strength-building. Eventually, the guys duel women in the Vixens En Garde thereby earning the right to meet the Queen. While back at the shop, Walt passes on a 1979 Meego Elastic Hulk figurine, despite its rarity, and some Battlestar Galactica props. He does, however, purchase artwork drawn by John Romita Jr. of Spider-Man fame.

=== Season 4 (2014–15) ===
No. overall	No. in season	Title	Original release date	US viewers (millions)
39	1	"Heir Apparent"	October 12, 2014	1.266
Kevin Smith sends his daughter Harley to the Stash to learn how to be a clerk. A customer sells his rare and unusual Rocky action figures.
40	2	"Walt’s Treehouse"	October 19, 2014	1.128
A returning customer swings by the store with a toy Walt always wanted but never had. An aspiring student brings in a book signed by comic greats.
41	3	"Stand Up Guys"	October 26, 2014	0.930
Walt challenges the guys to perform stand up comedy at the Stash. A collector brings in key Marvel comics from the 1960s.
42	4	"Super Baby"	November 3, 2014	1.279
The guys agree to help out a friend and babysit her daughter for the afternoon. An Indiana Jones superfan tries to sell rare items from the films.
43	5	"BronyCon"	November 10, 2014	1.386
Walt and the guys visit BronyCon, a fan convention for "My Little Pony." A customer wants to sell a board game from the 1970s featuring Godzilla.
44	6	"Bat Prints"	November 17, 2014	1.058
Walt considers buying hand and foot prints of Adam West and Burt Ward from the Batman TV show. A customer sells a rare set of Star Wars comic strips.
45	7	"Turtle Time"	November 23, 2014	0.992
Kevin Eastman, co-creator of the Teenage Mutant Ninja Turtles, brings in his earliest sketches of the turtles to the Stash.
46	8	"Stashbusters"	November 30, 2014	0.851
Walt has a business proposition for Ghostbusters actor Ernie Hudson. Then, a customer comes in to sell cartoon shampoo bottles from the '60s.
47	9	"Dragging Rights"	February 16, 2015	1.007
Adam West visits and a drag race between the Batmobile and the Black Beauty ignites. A customer sells the 1st comic appearance of Rocket Raccoon.
48	10	"Mr. Adams"	February 16, 2015	0.871
Comic legends, artist Neal Adams and writer Denny O'Neil, drop by the Stash. The guys look at a pristine set of 50-year-old Batman night lights.
49	11	"My Favorite Munster"	February 23, 2015	0.716
Butch Patrick, TV's Eddie Munster, drops by the Stash. A Star Wars action figure so rare it was never officially released lands on the counter.
50	12	"Secret Stashley"	March 1, 2015	0.448
Kevin's assistant Ashley brings her feminine wiles to the Stash and learns about comic book retail. A pair of pro wrestlers (Frankie Kazarian and Christopher Daniels) want to sell their comic.
51	13	"Sucka M.C."	March 8, 2015	0.920
Hip hop legend Darryl McDaniels of Run DMC brings his new comic in to the Stash. The guys look at a classic Marvel Silver Age #1 issue.
52	14	"Falcon for Sale"	March 15, 2015	0.665
Star Wars legend Billy Dee Williams drops by the Stash to win the Millennium Falcon the same way Lando lost it – in a high-stakes card game.
53	15	"KISS My Stash"	March 22, 2015	0.713
The boys rock out at a Kiss concert and Walt lives out his childhood dream of meeting Gene Simmons. Ming considers buying an arcade cabinet.
54	16	"Jay Invades"	March 22, 2015	0.807
Jason Mewes drops by the Stash to hang out and play clerk. Walt looks to acquire a mysterious recreation of some iconic comic book art.

=== Season 5 (2015–16) ===
No. overall	No. in season	Title	Original release date	US viewers (millions)
55	1	"Wookiee Fever"	October 18, 2015	0.925
Peter Mayhew ("Chewbacca") judges a wookiee contest at the Stash.
56	2	"Holy Zap Copter!"	October 18, 2015	0.662
Mike flies in the Batcopter to celebrate fifteen years at the Secret Stash. The guys look at one of the hottest comic books of the 1990s.
57	3	"The Captain and the Clerk"	October 25, 2015	0.886
Kevin talks comics with William Shatner. Walt covets a Mego doll that has unique packaging.
58	4	"Bryan Gets Bit"	November 1, 2015	0.886
The guys help Bryan take a dip into the icy waters of collecting by visiting a "JAWS museum." A roll of super-powered toilet paper comes through.
59	5	"Stash-pocalypse"	November 8, 2015	0.971
A hot zombie comic prompts the guys to reconsider their apocalyptic preparations. An eccentric collector comes seeking Walt's help.
60	6	"Stan Saves!"	February 14, 2016	1.107
Stan Lee drops by the Stash and helps the guys with a customer experiencing a comics crisis. A customer buys a classic issue of Fantastic Four.
61	7	"Making Clay"	February 21, 2016	0.721
Walt and Bryan audition the Secret Stash employees for a role in their new claymation film with friend and fellow podcaster Brian Quinn.
62	8	"Royal Romita"	February 28, 2016	0.747
Legendary comics artist John Romita Jr. draws an original piece for the Stash. Bryan's interest is piqued by an Evel Knievel toy from his childhood.
63	9	"Suburban Cowboys"	March 6, 2016	0.826
Inspired by an old friend, the guys wear cowboy hats and celebrate the old Wild West.
64	10	"Tell 'Em, Jim Lee!"	March 13, 2016	0.796
Artist Jim Lee shares tales from the world of comics on the podcast; a comic book brings wedding bells to the Stash.
65	11	"Insta-Ming"	March 20, 2016	0.740
When Ming gets a selfie stick, he tries to go viral by filming the Stash; Walt examines bootleg toys of an '80s blockbuster.
66	12	"Baby Jay"	March 27, 2016	0.814
Jason Mewes brings his infant daughter to the Stash to meet everyone; a customer sells comic book Slurpee cups.
67	13	"Hometown Heroes"	April 3, 2016	0.963
Phoenix Jones, a real-life superhero, visits the Stash and patrols Red Bank with the guys. Bry geeks out over a Bigfoot mask.

=== Season 6 (2016–17) ===
No. overall	No. in season	Title	Original release date	US viewers (millions)
68	1	"Bucket List"	October 23, 2016	0.940
Walt & the boys go on a trip to cross off a bucket-list item: being in the presence of Action Comics #1. Four key Spider-Man issues come to the Stash.
69	2	"Mistress of the Stash"	October 30, 2016	0.817
Horror queen Elvira helps out when the Stash sponsors a blood drive at the shop. The boys banter about the joys of Mystery Science Theater 3000.
70	3	"Pac-Ming"	November 6, 2016	0.766
Ming battles a customer when a vintage 1980s Pac-Man game lands on the counter. A rare Beatles board game has the guys flipping their mop-tops!
71	4	"KITT and Caboodle"	November 13, 2016	0.737
One of TV's most iconic cars, KITT from Knight Rider, pulls up to the Stash. Items include a rare Green Arrow Mego, and Archie Bunker's grandson.
72	5	"Bionic Customer"	November 20, 2016	0.800
Lindsay Wagner ("The Bionic Woman") stops in for a Silver Surfer item; Jem and Ghostbusters toys spark another round of banter.
73	6	"Joust-A-Bouts"	November 27, 2016	0.634
Things get medieval when Ming and a customer joust over the price of Batman #111. Wolverine shows up as the largest statue to ever enter the Stash.
74	7	"Wurst Episode Ever"	December 4, 2016	0.661
Kevin and Harley come to town for the Yoga Hosers premiere, and Ming gets transformed into the lead villain by a special-effects makeup legend.
75	8	"Stash Troopers"	December 11, 2016	0.878
Members of the 501st Legion of Storm Troopers invade the Stash looking for new recruits. Lives are at stake over the fate of a vintage Ewok playset.
76	9	"Karate Kustomer"	February 12, 2017	0.864
Ralph Macchio stops by looking for a rare Karate Kid playset, and Ming gets a lesson he’ll never forget. Walt flips over a pricey Mechagodzilla.
77	10	"Bats Ahoy!"	February 19, 2017	0.754
The Batboat docks in Red Bank, and the boys prepare for an adventure at sea. Batman's first appearance lands on the counter of the Secret Stash.
78	11	"Return of the Mewes"	February 26, 2017	0.823
Jason Mewes hangs with the boys and inserts himself into transactions involving a Deadshot statue and a vintage Death Star Space Station.
79	12	"Daughter of the Demon"	March 5, 2017	0.742
Actress Katrina Law from Arrow drops by to pick up a copy of Batman #232. Old school items involving Popeye, Dynomutt, and Pogs get some love.
80	13	"Rock 'Em Sock 'Em Stash"	March 12, 2017	0.757
Walt steps into the ring with a customer over an original Rock 'Em Sock 'Em Robots game; a rare piece of original Sal Buscema art.
81	14	"Marky Ramone-Bot"	April 9, 2017	0.312
Ramones drummer Marky Ramone shows off his artwork and bonds with Walt over old school robots. A King Kong item bring the boys back to 1975.
82	15	"The Amazing Walter"	April 16, 2017	0.195
A Kreskin ESP game reveals Walt’s secret powers of cognition. Items inspire discussions about Mork from Ork and Dick Tracy’s Rogues' Gallery.
83	16	"Reverse Stash"	April 23, 2017	0.239
The boys get a visit from Tom Cavanagh who plays Reverse Flash on The Flash TV series. Walt sniffs out a Golden Age classic with Human Torch #2.

=== Season 7 (2017–18) ===
No. overall	No. in season	Title	Original release date	US viewers (millions)
84	1	"Return of the Living Stash"	October 22, 2017	0.743
Kevin Smith and the guys discuss how The Walking Dead started out as a comic book and became a cultural phenomenon.
85	2	"Nightmare on Broad Street"	October 29, 2017	0.705
Legendary horror icon Robert Englund, aka Freddy Krueger, personally delivers a birthday present to Ming.
86	3	"Hail to the King"	November 19, 2017	0.610
The Stash & Red Bank cosplayers celebrate the Centennial of the late, great Jack Kirby, one of the greatest innovators in comic book history.
87	4	"Method Man's Mego"	November 26, 2017	0.458
Influential actor and rapper Method Man talks to the guys about his extensive comic book collection. Starsky & Hutch gear takes over The Stash.
88	5	"Stash Bash"	December 3, 2017	0.556
Jay & Silent Bob cosplayers take over the streets of Red Bank as the Comic Book Men attempt to make history by setting a Guinness World Record.
89	6	"In a Galaxy Very Nearby"	December 10, 2017	0.559
With rare and interesting Star Wars items making their way into the Stash, Walt offers up big cash to try and score a beacon for the store.
90	7	"Ode to Clerks"	February 25, 2018	0.476
Kevin Smith and the guys attend a premiere screening of Shooting Clerks, a film about themselves and how Clerks came to be.
91	8	"The Canine Crusaders"	March 4, 2018	0.544
Burt Ward, the infamous Robin the Boy Wonder, reminisces about his time on the set of Batman. He also judges the Stash's Canine Cosplay contest.
92	9	"Power Man vs. Counter Man"	March 11, 2018	0.393
Walt meets his match during a heated negotiation with actor Mike Colter (Luke Cage); a "legendary" video game becomes both Walt's trash and Ming's treasure.
93	10	"Troma-tized"	March 18, 2018	0.480
Troma Entertainment co-founder Lloyd Kaufman and his crew put the guys through a grueling audition to see if they have what it takes to be in a Troma film.
94	11	"A Pez-tacular Mystery"	March 25, 2018	0.418
The boys take a field trip to the Pez Museum to determine if Walt is actually the owner of an extremely rare and valuable piece of Pez history.
95	12	"The Mightiest of Mortals"	April 1, 2018	0.426
When Walt learns that Ming befriended actor Michael Gray (Shazam!), he decides that he must meet the "Mighty Mortal."
96	13	"Pop Goes the Stash"	April 8, 2018	0.461
Kevin and the boys attend the grand opening of Funko's new headquarters, where they get honored with their very own Pop! figures.

== The Secret Stash podcast ==
Each episode of Comic Book Men is accompanied by a companion podcast, titled The Secret Stash, which is hosted on the SModcast network. Some podcast episodes were pre-recorded during the filming of show, while others were recorded live on the SModcast Internet Radio station (S.I.R.) directly following the first airing of an episode, allowing the audience to participate by calling in to the show.

No.	Title	Length	Release date
1	"Suction Cup and Claw!"	32:48	February 12, 2012
The cast discuss the Six Million Dollar Man, The Bionic Woman, their toylines, and The Jetsons.
2	"Crap-pee-tol Punishment"	29:41	February 19, 2012
The cast discuss the Punisher comics, in particular the character's origin and the 1989 graphic novel Punisher: Intruder. Smith also asks the audience to submit anecdotes about their favorite childhood toys.
3	"Walt Digs Martin Riggs"	31:06	February 26, 2012
The cast discuss modern superhero movies and action movies, primarily the Lethal Weapon series.
4	"Crisis on Infinite SMearths"	43:49	March 4, 2012
The cast discuss their all-time favorite storylines, including classic Swamp Thing, Deadman stories, and The Dark Knight Returns.
5	"Where Does He Get Those Wonderful Toys?"	43:40 (2:08:44 total)	March 11, 2012
Walt, Bryan, Mike and Ming discuss toys with Rob Bruce. Plus: Kevin Smith and Scott Mosier interview Joe Casey about the new Ultimate Spider-Man cartoon.
6	"Prayers for Season 2"	1:04:38	March 18, 2012
Walt, Mike, Ming and Rob conclude the first season of Comic Book Men live on S.I.R..
7	"On the Air"	1:06:06	March 25, 2012
Bryan, Mike and Ming celebrate the premiere of the show's debut episode live on S.I.R. with Brian Quinn and Sal Vulcano from The Tenderloins/Impractical Jokers. Recorded February 12, 2012.
8	"Live Secret Stash"	1:44:48	October 14, 2012
Kevin, Bryan, Walt, Mike, and Ming celebrate the return of Comic Book Men with a live show at the Gramercy Theater in New York. Recorded October 12, 2012.
9	"New York Comic Con 2012"	48:40	October 23, 2012
Kevin, Bryan, Walt, Mike, and Ming star in a panel discussion of Comic Book Men at the New York Comic Con 2012.
10	"Bustin' Makes Me Feel Good"	51:42	October 28, 2012
Ming, Walt, Mike, and Rob Bruce discuss such topics as hockey in the afterlife, fear and spirituality...sort of.
11	"Special Bonus Features Included..."	52:48	November 11, 2012
Ming, Rob Bruce and PUCK NUTS' "Sunday Jeff" talk fondly about LaserDiscs, the Teenage Mutant Ninja Turtles and Kryptonite rocks.
12	"Run For Your Lives!!"	55:27	November 19, 2012
Mike and Ming talk 1966 Batman, sugar cereal and their experiences running for their lives from faux zombies with Run For Your Lives (obstacle racing) PR Coordinator Olivia Orth.
13	"Woodchuck And Squirrel Security"	44:48	November 25, 2012
Ming talks with Comic Book Men audio supervisor Tom Mumme about child discipline, Godzilla, The Kiss Army, the "Marvel World" playset, Star Wars Holiday Special and epic-length Kevin Smith autograph signings.
14	"Stan the Man"	55:12	December 2, 2012
Ming, Mike & Bryan talk about their extraordinary day at the store with comic book legend Stan Lee.
15	"Clash at the Stash"	51:33	February 14, 2013
Mike and Ming talk to MMA Fighter Nate Quarry about his past fights and his new comic title "Zombie Cagefighter".
16	"Super Hoagie"	46:18	February 21, 2013
Walt, Mike, Ming and Rob Bruce talk food phobias, childbirth, Amazing Fantasy#15 and crackheads.
17	"Stash-teroids"	41:02	March 1, 2013
Mike and Ming talk vintage arcade gaming, including Asteroids, Space Invaders, Donkey Kong & Sinistar.
18	"Con-Men"	44:05	March 9, 2013
Mike, Ming and Rob Bruce talk about the Gary Conover Charity Auction, and provide a commentary track for the TV episode.
19	"Stash Wars"	50:31	March 15, 2013
Ming and Rob Bruce talk about R2-Q5, Garbage Pail Kids and their favorite James Bond actors, and offer a primer on scoring great collectibles at flea markets.
20	"Cryptozoic Men"	54:16	March 23, 2013
Walt, Bryan and Ming talk about the upcoming "Cryptozoic Man" comic from Dynamite Entertainment (co-created by Walter, Bryan, Ming and Mike) and play a round of the hot new game "Tranny Surprise".
21	"Comic Charades"	42:39	March 29, 2013
Mike and Ming talk William Katt and The Greatest American Hero, while Walt chimes in on his "Kryptonite", his love for the works of George Pérez.
22	"Giant-Sized Anniversary"	58:25	April 5, 2013
Ming, Walt and Rob Bruce talk about meeting the New Jersey Devils, buying "live monkeys" from a comic book and the secret to longevity.
23	"NY Con Men"	62:19	October 16, 2013
Live from the 2013 New York Conic Con Comic Book Men Panel. With Kevin Smith, Mike Zapcic, Ming Chen, Walt Flanagan, Bryan Johnson, and Rob Bruce.
24	"To The Batcave Chum!"	46:50	October 25, 2013
Ming and Rob Bruce talk to Batcave owner Chris Weir.
25	"Super Friends"	41:30	October 30, 2013
Mike recaps the disaster that decimated his comic book collection and talks about meeting George Pérez.
26	"USS Ming"	37:39	November 12, 2013
Ming talks about his past GI Joe Obsessions and what it's like to finally captain the USS Flagg.
27	"Pity the Fool"	31:34	November 13, 2013
Mike and Ming talk about the phenomenon that was Mr. T and reminisce about The A-Team, Clubber Lang. Also: wtf was up with that orange speedo?
28	"Walt's Big Gamble"	59:26	November 20, 2013
Ming talks with Popculturalist Rob Bruce about the dangers of buying storage units. Ming gushes about James Cameron's Aliens. Also: Elfquest and Ben Cooper.
29	"Dukes of Jersey"	44:49	November 27, 2013
Ming and Rob Bruce talk about the Duke boys, Coy and Vance and running moonshine. Also: Bronies and Star Trek Megos.
30	"Cryptozoic Launch"	41:44	December 19, 2013
Ming is joined by the man who runs the store on Sundays, Sunday Jeff.
31	"Super Party"	56:51	February 14, 2014
Mike and Ming brag about attending the Super Party of the century and compare their Super costumes.
32	"Uhura's Uhura!"	58:11	February 20, 2014
Mike and Ming talk about meeting Nichelle Nichols and the hunt for her Mego doll. Also: Spaceballs, Mike's tears and X-Men #101 and He-Man.
33	"Pinheads"	46:58	February 28, 2014
Mike and Ming talk to actor, bowler and View Askew family member Brian O'Halloran.
34	"Trivia Chew Off"	47:37	April 17, 2014
Or: Ya Lose Ya Chews. Ming tries to explain why he was so horrible at Walt's comic book trivia chew off. Mike laments never being able to participate in The Family Feud.
35	"The Esposito Collection"	45:20	August 18, 2014
Ming talks to Rob Bruce about the Mike Esposito auction and the value of his artwork. Also: Hot Toys and the Paper Fonz.
36	"Heir Apparent"	42:50	October 23, 2014
Ming is joined by the man who runs the store on Sundays, Sunday Jeff.
37	"Stand-Up Guys"	37:15	October 27, 2014
Bryan Johnson, Walt Flanagan, Ming, and special guest Brian "Q" Quinn recap their experiences in the world of stand-up comedy.
38	"Super Baby"	48:18	November 19, 2014
Mike and Ming talk to the mother of Maltar - Kari - and find out if the Comic Book Men passed the test of comic book retailer fatherhood.
39	"Stan Saves!"	45:05	February 18, 2016
Mike and Ming talk about Stan Lee's return to The Stash and what he means to the world of comics and pop culture today.
40	"Makin' Clay"	47:01	February 24, 2016
Ming and Mike talk about their experiences auditioning for the Tell 'Em Steve-Dave! claymation project. Also: Zuni Fetish Dolls and Maskatron from The Six Million Dollar Man.
41	"Royal Romita"	53:41	March 3, 2016
Mike and Ming talk about comic book legend John Romita Jr., his amazing artwork and his visit to The Stash. Also: The legendary Evel Knievel and the extra miles we trek to complete a sale.
42	"Suburban Cowboys"	40:23	March 8, 2016
We're going to Wild West City! Ming and Mike take about having a routine' tootin' good time in the Wild Wild West - or as close as they can get to it. Also: Back to the Future and Secret Wars #8.
43	"Tell 'em Jim Lee!"	42:37	March 17, 2016
Mike and Ming talk about meeting comic book legend Jim Lee. Also: a wedding proposal at The Stash, electronic vibrating football, Gremlins and The Princess Bride.
44	"Insta-Ming"	57:04	March 23, 2016
Selfies galore! Ming talks about why he loves the selfie stick and tried to blow upon social media. Mike talks about the popularity of Harley Quinn and Batman Adventures #12. Also: Flash Gordon, Fangoria magazine and The NeverEnding Story.
45	"Baby Jay"	41:53	April 20, 2016
Mike and Ming welcome Logan Lee Mewes to The Stash and talk about Jason Mewes' newest addition. Also: 7-Eleven comic book cups, the Mego Batcave and the McFarlane Leatherface.
46	"KITT and Caboodle"	36:36	November 14, 2016
Ming recaps the Season 6 episode entitled KITT and Caboodle and brings in special guest and PopCulturist Rob Bruce to talk Megos and anatomically correct dolls.
47	"Return of the Living Stash"	40:52	October 29, 2017
The special Comic Book Men Walking Dead Edition.
