= Clive Barker's unrealized projects =

During his long career, British artist Clive Barker has worked on several projects which never progressed beyond the pre-production stage under his direction. Some of these projects fell in development hell, were officially canceled, were in development limbo or would see life under a different production team.

== 1990s ==
=== The Mummy remake ===
In the early 1990s, it was announced that Barker would write and direct a remake of The Mummy for Universal Pictures with Mick Garris set co-write the remake with Barker, but that iteration was canceled and eventually became the 1999 film with Brendan Fraser.

=== The Thief of Always film ===
On February 13, 1994, Paramount Pictures and The Kennedy/Marshall Company were set to produce an animated film adaptation of Barker's The Thief of Always in a collaboration with Nelvana Communications. On March 26, 1997, Universal Pictures was set to produce a live-action film adaptation with Bernard Rose attached to write and direct the movie adaptation. In the 2000s, Universal Pictures was set to produce a CGI-animated film adaptation. But on February 7, 2006, 20th Century Fox acquired the rights and Kelly Asbury was hired to write and direct the live-action film adaptation with Barker producing through his Seraphim Films, until Barker confirmed that Oliver Parker would direct a live-action feature film adaptation with David Barron producing without a major studio. In the years following these developments, there continued to be interest in bringing The Thief of Always to the screen in various forms. In 2010, there were discussions about creating a mini-series that would explore the story's themes in greater depth, aiming for a more mature and comprehensive adaptation. A year later, several screenwriters pitched new takes on the story, envisioning a blend of live-action with innovative special effects to bring Barker's fantastical elements to life.

By 2015, the discussions reignited with a focus on streaming platforms looking to adapt literary works. The Thief of Always emerged as a prime candidate due to its rich narrativers, The Thief of Always continued to hold a special place in the hearts of both fans and filmmakers, ensuring that the story of Harvey Swick and his adventures would likely someday find a new life on screen.

=== Weird Tales TV series ===
On April 10, 1995, Barker was set to write, direct and produce episodes of the horror anthology series Weird Tales for HBO.

== 2000s ==
=== The Books of Abarat film ===
On April 15, 2000, The Walt Disney Company acquired the rights to adapt Barker's The Books of Abarat, but in 2006, Barker revealed that the film adaptation failed at Disney.

=== Myths Over Miami film ===
The rights to the 1997 article Myths Over Miami, written by Lynda Edwards, were bought by Disney in 2000. Clive Barker was the producer and the one behind the deal.

=== Halloween vs. Hellraiser film ===
In 2002, Doug Bradley revealed on a Your Move Magazine interview that Barker would write the screenplay for Halloween vs. Hellraiser, with John Carpenter set to direct, but producer Moustapha Akkad vehemently opposed to the idea.

=== Demonik video game/film ===
On May 19, 2005, it was announced that Barker would write the video game Demonik, a horror-action video game for Majesco and Terminal Reality, as well as write and direct the feature film adaptation. But the game was rejected by Majesco. On April 24, 2013, the trailer to the video game was uploaded onto the YouTube channel Player's Mind and on GameSpot in 2019.

=== Edgar Allan Poe ghost YA film ===
On November 30, 2006, it was announced that Barker would write a YA movie centered around the ghost of Edgar Allan Poe, and produce it along with Seraphim Films Anthony DiBlasi and Joseph Daley and Walden Media.

=== Born ===
In 2007, it was announced that Barker would be an executive producer of Born, a live action and stop-motion film with Daniel Simpson attached to direct from a script by Barker and Paul Kaye, as well as Guillermo del Toro, Lawrence Gordon and Lloyd Levin involved as producers, Jennifer Connelly and Paul Bettany were set to star as husband and pregnant wife move, whose lives are shattered when the husband's Claymation cartoons start to come to life and reenact his nightmares, and The Chiodo Brothers, known for Killer Klowns from Outer Space, were set to create the animation.

=== Down, Satan! ===
In 2008 it was reported that Barker's four page short-story Down, Satan! from The Books of Blood was being adapted into a movie. The script was written by Christopher Monfette for Barker's production company, Seraphim.

=== Hotel TV series ===
On August 13, 2009, it was announced that Barker would be an executive producer of the television series Hotel from writing duo Marcus Dunstan and Patrick Melton, and McG's company Wonderland Sound and Vision producing the series with Warner Bros. Television.

== 2010s ==
=== Zombies vs. Gladiators ===
On June 5, 2012, Barker rewrote the screenplay for the zombie film Zombies vs. Gladiators for Prime Video.

=== Hellraiser remake ===
On October 25, 2013, Barker confirmed that he wrote the screenplay for a darker remake of Hellraiser that he would direct and Doug Bradley would star as Pinhead, but on April 10, 2020, David Bruckner was set to direct the remake with Jamie Clayton playing Pinhead.

=== Jacqueline Ess film ===
On January 29, 2014, Barker was set to produce the film adaptation of his short story “Jacqueline Ess” as coproduction with Raven Banner.

=== Clive Barker Presents Reel Fear ===
In 2017, it was announced that Barker would run a filmmaking contest in conjunction with Project Greenlight Digital Studios and Shudder where the winning team would receive a $300,000 budget to make a film, as well as a mentorship from Barker throughout the production. Following over 1,000 short film submissions, the project Wither by director Danny DelPurgatorio and writer Anthony Williams was chosen as the winner. The film was ultimately never made.

== Offers ==
=== End of Days ===
Barker was offered to direct End of Days before Peter Hyams was hired.

=== Alien 3 ===
He was offered to write and direct Alien 3, but was not interested.
