= Pavlou =

Pavlou (Greek: Παύλου) is a Greek surname. Notable people with the surname include:

- George Pavlou, English film director
- Kyriacos Pavlou (born 1986), Cypriot footballer
- Stel Pavlou (born 1970), English author
- Drew Pavlou, Australian pro-Hong Kong activist
