= Underworld (1985 film) =

1985 British science fiction horror film

- American theatrical release poster under the title Transmutations
- Directed by: George Pavlou
- Screenplay by: Clive Barker; James Caplin
- Story by: Clive Barker
- Produced by: Kevin Attew; Don Hawkins
- Starring: Larry Lamb; Denholm Elliott; Steven Berkoff; Nicola Cowper; Miranda Richardson; Art Malik; Ingrid Pitt
- Cinematography: Sydney Macartney
- Edited by: Chris Ridsdale
- Music by: Freur
- Production company: Green Man Productions
- Release date: 29 November 1985 (UK)
- Running time: 88 minutes
- Country: United Kingdom
- Language: English
- Budget: $1.5 million

Underworld, also released as Transmutations, is a 1985 British science fiction horror film directed by George Pavlou and written by Clive Barker and James Caplin, from a story by Barker. It stars Larry Lamb, Denholm Elliott, Steven Berkoff, Nicola Cowper, Miranda Richardson, Art Malik, Ingrid Pitt and Irina Brook. The story combines film noir, science fiction and horror, following a former criminal searching for a woman abducted by mutated humans living beneath London.

The film was an early feature-film project for Barker, who had recently attracted attention for his Books of Blood short-story collections. Barker conceived the story specifically for Pavlou after the director approached him about developing a film. Pavlou and Barker subsequently collaborated on Rawhead Rex (1986), before Barker made his feature directorial debut with Hellraiser (1987).

The score was composed and performed by Welsh new wave group Freur. Members Karl Hyde and Rick Smith later adopted the name Underworld for their subsequent band, taking the name from the film.

== Plot ==
Former criminal Roy Bain is approached by businessman and crime boss Hugo Motherskille after Nicole, a prostitute and Bain's former lover, disappears. Bain agrees to find her and discovers that she has been abducted by a group of physically mutated people living in tunnels beneath London.

The mutants, known as the Underworlders, are dependent on a hallucinogenic drug created by biochemist Dr Savary. The drug produces intense dreams but has also caused severe mutations among those who use it. Savary exploits the Underworlders' dependency while conducting further experiments.

As Bain searches for Nicole, he becomes caught between Motherskille's criminal organisation, Savary and the inhabitants of the underground community. He discovers that the apparent monsters are themselves victims of Savary's experiments and that Nicole has become central to their hope of escaping their dependence on him.

Bain ultimately descends into the Underworld in an attempt to rescue Nicole, bringing the competing groups into violent confrontation.

== Cast ==
- Larry Lamb as Roy Bain
- Denholm Elliott as Dr Savary
- Steven Berkoff as Hugo Motherskille
- Nicola Cowper as Nicole
- Miranda Richardson as Oriel
- Art Malik as Fluke
- Irina Brook as Bianca
- Ingrid Pitt as Pepperdine
- Brian Croucher as Darling
- Trevor Thomas as Ricardo
- Sean Chapman as Buchanan
- Gary Olsen as Red Dog
- Phil Davis as Lazarus

== Production ==
=== Development and writing ===
Underworld originated after director George Pavlou approached Clive Barker about developing a feature film. Barker had begun attracting attention for his horror fiction and was interested in working in film. According to Barker, Pavlou asked him to write a screenplay and the project developed from their discussions.

Barker initially wrote a treatment in 1982. Producer Kevin Attew later recalled that Pavlou brought Green Man Productions a synopsis for the project before Barker's books had been published and that the company saw the project as an opportunity to develop Pavlou as a filmmaker.

The project was not approved for production until late 1984, with principal photography scheduled to begin in January 1985. Barker interrupted work on his novel The Damnation Game to develop the earlier treatment into a screenplay. James Caplin subsequently shared screenplay credit with Barker.

Barker conceived the film as a mixture of horror, film noir and fantasy rather than a conventional slasher film. He described its subterranean setting as a meeting point between the respectable surface world and its monstrous counterpart, while deliberately making many of the ostensibly normal characters morally corrupt.

Pavlou cited several cinematic influences on the film's visual style, including Dario Argento, particularly Suspiria and Inferno, as well as David Cronenberg. Pavlou encouraged Barker to think in highly stylised visual terms while developing the screenplay.

=== Filming and effects ===
The production had a reported budget of approximately $1.5 million.

The Underworlders' physical mutations were created using practical make-up effects. Effects designer Peter Litten recalled that some of Pavlou's initial concepts were considered too elaborate or grotesque to reproduce effectively on screen. The designs were consequently modified to retain recognisable human characteristics and encourage audience sympathy for the mutants.

Barker described the production as a collaborative introduction to feature filmmaking. Unlike the solitary process of writing fiction, he enjoyed responding to suggestions from the filmmakers and rewriting material during production.

== Music ==
The film's electronic score was created by Freur, the Welsh new wave group whose members included Karl Hyde and Rick Smith.

Hyde and Smith later formed a new version of their musical partnership under the name Underworld. The name was taken from the film they had scored.

== Release ==
Underworld was released in the United Kingdom in 1985. In the United States, Empire International Pictures released the film under the title Transmutations in 1986.

Different versions of the film have circulated. The original release has generally been listed at approximately 88–92 minutes, while a longer 103-minute alternate cut also exists.

In 2023, Kino Lorber released Underworld on Ultra HD Blu-ray under its Kino Cult label. The release used a new 4K scan of the original 35 mm camera negative and included the 103-minute alternate version on the accompanying Blu-ray, archival production footage and a new audio commentary by Pavlou and film historian Stephen Thrower.

== Reception and legacy ==
Contemporary and retrospective assessments of Underworld have generally been mixed to negative. Writer Neil Gaiman, reviewing the film during the 1980s, considered its central concept promising but criticised its pacing, performances and execution, describing it as a visually stylish film whose ideas were not successfully realised.

Barker's friend and collaborator Pete Atkins similarly praised the ideas behind the film but criticised its storytelling and direction, arguing that its visual emphasis came at the expense of narrative momentum.

The film nevertheless occupies a significant place in Barker's early screen career. Sight and Sound, discussing Barker's subsequent directorial debut Hellraiser, characterised Underworld and Rawhead Rex as his two early British screenwriting projects and suggested that their shortcomings contributed to his decision to exercise greater creative control over the film adaptation of The Hellbound Heart.

Barker and Pavlou worked together again immediately afterwards on Rawhead Rex, which Barker adapted from his story in Books of Blood. Barker then wrote and directed Hellraiser in 1987.

The film also had an unrelated musical legacy through Freur. After scoring Underworld, Karl Hyde and Rick Smith adopted its title as the name of their subsequent band, Underworld, which later became associated with British electronic music and the 1996 film Trainspotting through the song "Born Slippy .NUXX".
