= Father of Lies (disambiguation) =

The Father of Lies is a title of the Devil in Christianity.

Father of Lies may also refer to:

- The Father of Lies, a title of the ancient Greek historian Herodotus
- Father of Lies (novel), a 1998 novel by Brian Evenson
- The Father of Lies (collection), a 2018 short story collection by Tom Holt

== See also ==
- The Painter, The Creature and The Father of Lies, a 2011 essay collection by Clive Barker
- "For He Is a Liar and the Father of Lies", an episode of The Righteous Gemstones
