= Clive Barker's Undying =

2001 video game

- Developer: EA Los Angeles (Note: Ported to Mac OS X by Westlake Interactive)
- Publisher: EA Games (Note: Published by Aspyr Media for Mac OS X)
- Director: Brady Bell
- Producer: Brady Bell
- Designer: Dellekamp Siefert
- Programmer: J. Scott Peter
- Artists: Jeff Haynie; Brian Horton
- Writer: Clive Barker
- Composer: Bill Brown
- Engine: Unreal Engine 1
- Platforms: Microsoft Windows; Mac OS X
- Release: Microsoft Windows: NA: February 22, 2001; EU: March 16, 2001; Mac OS X: NA: June 11, 2002
- Genre: First-person shooter
- Mode: Single-player

Clive Barker's Undying is a 2001 horror first-person shooter video game developed by EA Los Angeles and published by EA Games. The game's story was written by acclaimed horror writer Clive Barker. He also provided the voice of Ambrose Covenant, a character in the game.

Undying follows the adventures of 1920s Irish paranormal adventurer Patrick Galloway as he investigates the mysterious occult happenings at the estate of his friend Jeremiah Covenant. It received favorable reviews from critics, and gained a cult following.

== Plot ==
In 1923, World War I veteran Patrick Galloway receives an urgent letter from his friend Jeremiah Covenant. Covenant, well aware of Galloway's reputation for dealing with occult matters, is in failing health and raves about a curse that has destroyed his entire family. Galloway travels to the Covenant estate on the coast of Ireland to visit his friend, who relates an outlandish tale of supernatural terrors.

Jeremiah Covenant is the eldest of five children, his siblings being, from eldest to youngest, twins Bethany and Aaron, Ambrose, and Lizbeth. As children, the Covenants found a strange occult book in their father's library and performed a ritual found within at an ancient set of standing stones located on an island on their family's extensive estate. This seemingly childish game, however, brought the wrath of evil forces upon the family. After reaching adulthood, the Covenants fell one by one into madness and then death, eventually leaving Jeremiah as the only survivor. The power of the curse, however, has reanimated his fallen siblings as monsters of pure evil; they have been haunting Jeremiah and he fears that he will soon follow where they have gone.

Galloway decides to honour his friend's wishes by trying to stop whatever was set in motion long ago at the ancient stones where the ritual was performed. Through the Covenants' journals and Galloway's own memories, the player learns more about the nature of the curse and the creature behind it: the Undying King, a powerful demonic presence threatening to destroy the reality we inhabit. He also receives a vision of a group of priests burying a Celtic king alive as part of a ritual in ancient times.

While attempting to prevent the Undying King from entering our world, Patrick must face off against the four undead Covenant siblings as well as Count Otto Keisinger, an evil rival who simply wants to gain power from the demonic forces.

As Patrick begins to unravel the mysteries of the Covenant family, he finds himself travelling throughout both time and space, traversing both the ancient past and other dimensions entirely. During his journey to the past, he arrives in a monastery where the only weapon that can permanently kill the Covenant siblings is located, namely the Scythe of the Celts. However, due to the presence of the Scythe in the monastery, all of the monks have fallen under its influence, turning them from benevolent worshippers of faith into murderous psychopaths.

After retrieving the Scythe, Patrick first disposes of Lizbeth in the Covenant family catacombs. Having tossed her head off a cliff, he arrives back at the mansion in time to speak with Jeremiah, but Ambrose interrupts their meeting. Demanding the Gel'ziabar Stone that Patrick carries in exchange for Jeremiah's life, Ambrose still beheads his sibling after he has gotten it, turning himself into a hulking ogre-like monster. Patrick manages to kill Ambrose in revenge. His next step is then to go after Keisinger, and after a taxing battle Patrick manages to defeat his rival. Keisinger's death liberates the inhabitants of the magical dimension of Oneiros that Keisinger had enslaved to his will.

Next, he searches for the body of Aaron, whose intangible, but dangerous ghost is haunting the estate and has been annoying and impeding Patrick on several occasions. He discovers it in a private torture chamber where Bethany had secretly imprisoned and horrifically tortured her hated brother to death, and destroys his undead form. Patrick finally confronts the last of the evil Covenant siblings, Bethany, after she traps him in the magical primeval dimension Eternal Autumn, only to find himself suddenly returned to the island where it had all begun all those years ago, and finds himself facing an unexpected enemy - Jeremiah himself.

Rather than being a passive, remorseful observer of the tragic events, Jeremiah had in fact been just as corrupted as his siblings, having died and been resurrected during the war, and had just been using his old friend to get rid of his more powerful siblings so he could take Patrick's Gel'ziabar Stone and use it to siphon the power of the Undying King into himself, allowing Jeremiah to remake the world as he saw fit. Enraged at his friend's treachery, Patrick beheads Jeremiah, but this proves to be a mistake, as with the last Covenant slain, the seal is broken, and the Undying King is released. The ground bursts open, releasing the mummified remains of the Celtic warrior who had been used to seal away the Undying King by the original druids, and the warrior quickly crumbles to dust. Then, the King itself, a hideous, insectoid monstrosity, finally breaches the walls to our reality.

After a long, difficult battle, Patrick is able to destroy the King, but as he leaves the island in a daze, a man he recognizes (and who he says cannot possibly be there) steals his Gel'ziabar Stone and claims that he is not done with Patrick yet. A sequel hook is added by a mention that after researching the brotherhood of monks, Patrick learns that they had monasteries at similar sites all over the world, and he realizes that this is just one of many coming trials.

== Gameplay ==
The gameplay of Undying in general follows the precepts of the first-person shooter genre. The game simulates the main character Patrick Galloway's point of view for the player, who uses a variety of weapons to defeat enemies within the game while progressing through a series of levels. As with most FPSs, Galloway has a certain amount of health, represented by a cross symbol and corresponding number at the bottom center-left of the screen. Each time the player is hurt by an enemy the health number is continually reduced until it reaches zero, at which point Galloway dies - an event which is usually marked by a third-person cut scene, unique to each enemy type, showing his gruesome final moments. To prevent this, health can be replenished when low using health packs. Galloway's maximum health can also be increased when using the alternate mode of the scythe, but it drains quickly back to the standard amount of health.

In Undying the player is capable of using both conventional weapons and magical abilities simultaneously.

Another aspect of the gameplay of Undying - and one which gives it a similar ambience to traditional role-playing video games - is that along with its set of offensive weapons, the player is able to use a wide range of magical spells. Spells consume a certain amount of Galloway's magical energy, or "Mana", which is represented by a flask icon and corresponding number on the bottom center-right of the screen. This energy slowly regenerates itself over time. Magical tattoo pickups called "Arcane Whorls" permanently increase mana regeneration rate, while amulets called "Mana Wells" increase maximum mana by 10 up to 200. Once the player acquires a spell, it may be boosted in power each time the player finds an "Amplifier Stone", which are purple glowing crystals scattered throughout levels of the game. Galloway can simultaneously wield weapons in his left hand and cast magical spells with his right; the power of both the weapons and the spells increase as the game progresses.

Also, as is common with first-person shooters, combat is interspersed with simple puzzle-solving elements which usually involve overcoming an obstacle (such as a locked door) which impedes the player's progress through the game. Along with the usual "find the key" solution, the player is also often required to engage in conversation with (non-player) characters, or use a certain spell (usually the "Scrye" spell) in order to find out how to proceed.

== Development ==
Originally, the protagonist of the game was to be "Count Magnus Wolfram", a tattooed man with superhuman strength and supernatural abilities. Barker himself rejected this idea, noting that the more normal, down-to-earth Patrick Galloway would be easier to relate to for the average gamer. Wolfram's character model plays a small part in the finished product, however. He is the Trsanti shaman who attacks a younger Galloway with the Gel'ziabar Stone in the opening cutscene flashback.

Undying lacks any form of multiplayer, including cooperative gameplay or online play. The game was originally planned to ship with a multiplayer aspect, but given time constraints it was later to be relegated to a post-release patch.

The game was announced at E3 2000.

== Reception ==
Reception

Aggregate scores
Aggregator	Score	
Aggregator	Macintosh	PC
GameRankings	90%	84%
Metacritic	N/A	85/100

Review scores
Publication	Score	
Publication	Macintosh	PC
AllGame	N/A	3.5/5
Computer Games Strategy Plus	N/A	4/5
Computer Gaming World	N/A	4/5
EP Daily	N/A	8/10
Game Informer	N/A	8/10
GameRevolution	N/A	C+
GameSpot	N/A	9.1/10
GameSpy	N/A	89%
GameZone	N/A	8.5/10
IGN	9/10	9/10
Next Generation	N/A	3/5
PC Gamer (US)	N/A	85%
X-Play	N/A	4/5

The PC version received "favorable" reviews according to the review aggregation website Metacritic. Star Dingo of GamePro said, "It would've been simple to turn Undying into a straightforward first person shooter, an alternate version of Unreal, only with more gothic castles, werewolves, and European accents. Instead, the careful craftsmen at DreamWorks [sic] have forged a complex, gothic horror story, pushing Undying far beyond the level of mere Quake-copycat. It's well worth dying for." (Note: GamePro gave the PC version two 4.5/5 scores for graphics and control, and two 5/5 scores for sound and fun factor.) However, Jeff Lundrigan of NextGen said of the game, "The production design is top-notch, and there are some good first-person thrills, but about halfway through it nearly runs out of steam."

During the 5th Annual Interactive Achievement Awards, the Academy of Interactive Arts & Sciences nominated Undying for the "PC Action/Adventure" award, but ultimately lost to Return to Castle Wolfenstein. The game was also a nominee for the "Best Action Game" award at Computer Gaming World's 2002 Premier Awards, which ultimately went to Aliens versus Predator 2. The staff of Computer Games Magazine also nominated it for the "Best Action Game" award at the 11th Annual Computer Games Awards, which went to Operation Flashpoint: Cold War Crisis. The staff of PC Gamer US awarded the game their "Best Atmosphere" award at the Eighth Annual PC Gamer Awards, and noted that it was "soaked in suspense." The game was also nominated for the "Best Graphics in a PC Game", "Best Sound in a PC Game", "Most Artistic PC Game", and "Best Action Game for PC" awards at The Electric Playground's 2001 Blister Awards, which went to Max Payne (Graphics, Action Game), Aliens versus Predator 2, and Myst III: Exile, respectively.

The game sold poorly with sales so low that announced plans for a multiplayer patch were abandoned. Console versions of the game were also cancelled, and EA and Brady Bell shelved the idea of a sequel.

== See also ==
- American McGee's Alice, another auteur-branded PC horror game by EA Games released around the same time
- Clive Barker's Jericho, a squad-based horror FPS whose story was also written by Barker
