= Rawhead Rex =

Rawhead Rex may refer to:

- "Rawhead Rex", a short story in Volume Three of Clive Barker's Books of Blood
- Rawhead Rex (film), a 1986 horror film adapted from the story
