= The Damnation Game =

The Damnation Game may refer to:

- The Damnation Game (novel), a 1985 novel by horror writer Clive Barker
- The Damnation Game (album), a 1995 album by progressive metal band Symphony X
