= Jives =

Jives may refer to:

- Jive, of one of the villains in the 1992 American novel The Thief of Always by Clive Barker
- Jives, the English name of the character Maggi Mjói from the Icelandic educational musical children's television program LazyTown
