= Imajica =

1991 fantasy novel by Clive Barker

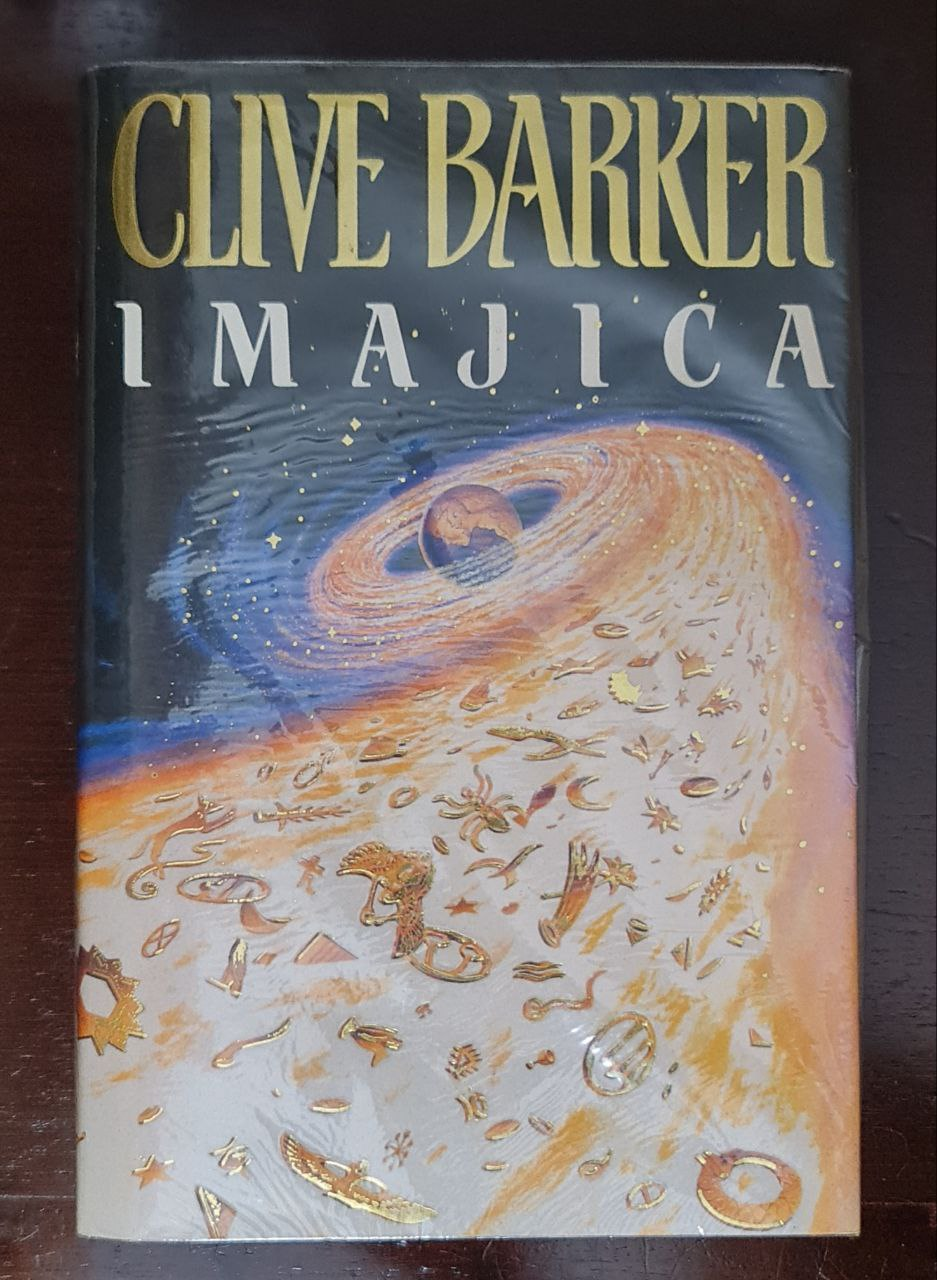
- First edition (U.K.)
- Author: Clive Barker
- Cover artist: Kirk Reinert (U.S.); David O'Connor (U.K.)
- Language: English
- Genre: Dark fantasy; Horror
- Publisher: HarperCollins
- Publication date: October 1991
- Media type: Print (Hardcover)
- Pages: 824
- ISBN: 0-06-017922-8 (U.S.); 0-00-223559-5 (U.K.)
- OCLC: 24340445
- Dewey Decimal: 823.914
- LC Class: PR6052.A6475I47 1991

Imajica is a 1991 dark fantasy horror novel by English author Clive Barker. Set within a multiverse of parallel dimensions, the narrative weaves together themes of reality, magic, and the cosmic forces that shape existence.

The story follows John Furie Zacharias, also known as Gentle, as he becomes embroiled in a multidimensional conflict involving parallel universes, powerful beings, and the mysteries of creation.

== Background ==
Barker has stated in interview that he wrote the first draft of Imajica as a manuscript of "14,000 hand written pages." He says in an interview with David Howe: "Imajica started with my thinking about the images which appear in the great paintings of Christian mythology. Whether or not they're true, they seemed to me to be a potent, powerful and important cyphers of image and meaning."

== Reception ==
The novel received critical acclaim. Critics praised Imajica for its ambition, world-building, and blend of dark fantasy, horror, and metaphysical themes. It was often seen as Barker's finest work, although some criticism was aimed towards the book's length and complexity.

Writing in Fangoria, W. C. Stroby lauded Barker's boldness in tackling "the Big Questions" of love, death, God, and oblivion. He described Imajica as "audacious, arrogant and subversive in the most imaginative and visionary of ways," declaring it to be Barker's best book. Kirkus Reviews deemed the novel as "an astonishing feat of the imagination" that runs "riot with ideas, fantastical inventions, graphic sex and violence, soul-terrors, and emotional and intellectual resonances," and commended Barker for surpassing his previous achievements.

British film editor Jon Gregory acknowledged Barker's ongoing obsession with religious imagery and the role of women in his narratives, often portraying them as possessing transformative powers. He highlighted the novel's scope, suggesting that Imajica is a reworking of the Christ myth, filled with monsters and mayhem, and concluded that the book represented a "step upwards" for Barker, offering a story with greater thematic range than his previous works.

In his review for The Washington Post, Stefan Dziemianowicz revered Barker as a "latter-day Lewis Carroll," adept at transforming contemporary issues – such as AIDS, racial and sexual politics, and censorship – into mythological material. However, he opined that the novel tends to digress, describing it as a "Chinese puzzle box constructed on a universal scale," and pointing out that, while Imajica dazzles with its inventiveness, it sometimes suffers from an overindulgence in detail that detracts from the overall plot.

Additionally, Publishers Weekly celebrated Barker's "prodigious imagination," noting his ability to conjure vivid characters, gods, and creatures, while acknowledging the book's complexity. The review highlighted Imajica's "mesmerizing invention" and its blend of violence, eroticism, and myth.

== Awards and nominations ==
Imajica was a finalist for the 1992 Locus Award for Best Horror/Dark Fantasy Novel. It won the 1997 Prix Julia Verlanger for best foreign-language novel, as well as the 1998 Grand Prix de l'Imaginaire for best foreign-language novel.
