= Clive Barker =

English author, film director and visual artist (born 1952)

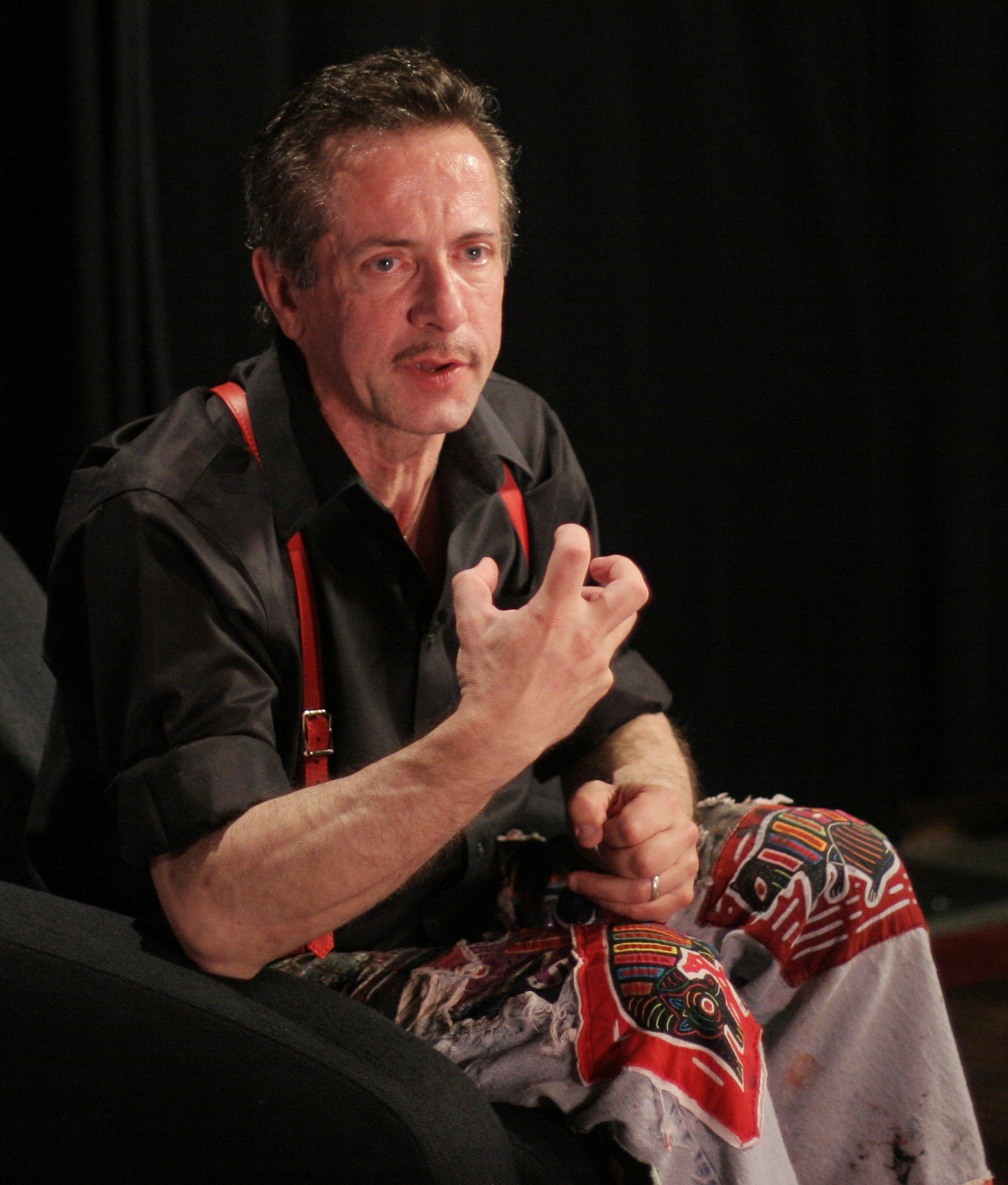
- Barker in 2007
- Born: 5 October 1952 (age 74); Liverpool, England
- Occupations: Writer; filmmaker; visual artist
- Years active: 1970–present
- Website: clivebarker.com

Clive Barker (born 5 October 1952) is a British writer, filmmaker, and visual artist. He came to prominence in the 1980s with a series of short stories collectively named the Books of Blood, which established him as a leading horror author. His work has been adapted into films, notably the Hellraiser series (the first installment of which he also wrote and directed) and the Candyman series.

Barker's paintings and illustrations have been shown in galleries in the United States, and have appeared in his books. He has also created characters and series for comic books, and some of his more popular horror stories have been featured in ongoing comics series.

== Early life ==
Barker was born in Liverpool on 5 October 1952. His mother, Joan Ruby (née Revill), was a painter and school welfare officer; his father, Leonard Barker, worked as the personnel director for an industrial relations firm. He was educated at Dovedale Primary School and Quarry Bank High School in Liverpool before attending the University of Liverpool, where he studied English and philosophy. At the age of three, he witnessed the infamous death of French skydiver Léo Valentin, who plummeted to the ground during a performance at an air show in Liverpool. He would later allude to Valentin in many of his stories.

== Theatrical work ==
Barker's involvement in live theatre began while still in school with productions of Voodoo and Inferno in 1967. He collaborated on six plays with Theatre of the Imagination in 1974 and two more that he was the sole writer of, A Clowns' Sodom and Day of the Dog, for The Mute Pantomime Theatre in 1976 and 1977.

Barker co-founded the avant-garde theatrical troupe The Dog Company in 1978 with former schoolmates and up-and-coming actors, many of whom would go on to become key collaborators in his film work; Doug Bradley, his long-time friend and former classmate at Quarry Bank High School in Liverpool, took on the now-iconic role of Pinhead in the Hellraiser series while Peter Atkins wrote the scripts for the first three Hellraiser sequels. Over the next five years Barker wrote nine plays, often serving as director, including some of his best-known stage productions, The History of The Devil, Frankenstein in Love, and The Secret Life of Cartoons.

From 1982 to 1983, he wrote Crazyface, Subtle Bodies, and Colossus for the Cockpit Youth Theatre.

His theatrical work came to a close as he shifted focus to writing the Books of Blood.

== Writing career ==
Barker is an author of horror and fantasy, although he has said that he thinks of his writing less and less as horror. He began writing early in his career, mostly in the form of short stories (collected in Books of Blood 1–6) and the Faustian novel The Damnation Game (1985). Later he moved toward modern-day fantasy and urban fantasy with horror elements in Weaveworld (1987), The Great and Secret Show (1989), the world-spanning Imajica (1991), and Sacrament (1996).

When Books of Blood was first published in the United States in paperback, Stephen King was quoted on the book covers: "I have seen the future of horror and his name is Clive Barker." As influences on his writing, Barker lists Herman Melville, Edgar Allan Poe, Ray Bradbury, William S. Burroughs, William Blake, and Jean Cocteau, among others.

He is the writer of the best-selling Abarat series.

In early 2024, he announced he would stop attending conventions and public events so he could focus more on his writing, as he was working on the manuscripts for 31 different projects, some closer to completion than others.

On 18 August 2026, he announced his return to short fiction with three new fiction anthologies, collectively referred to as "Library of the Dead". They were intended to be a "spiritual successor" to The Books of Blood, and would be financed via Kickstarter. The campaign reached its financing goal within one hour, with the first volume expected to be released in Spring of 2027. The collection will include both new and out-of-print material that received limited exposure upon its original publication.

== Personal life ==
Barker stated on Loveline in 1996 that he had several relationships with older women during his teenage years, but realised he was gay when he was around 18 or 19 years old. He dated John Gregson from 1975 to 1986, and was later in a relationship from 1996 to 2009 with photographer David Armstrong, who was described as his husband in the introduction to Coldheart Canyon.

During his early years as a writer, Barker occasionally worked as an escort when his writing did not provide sufficient income. He has been open about his experiences with sadomasochism, calling himself a "six" on its "sliding scale".

In 2003, Barker received the Davidson/Valentini Award at the 15th GLAAD Media Awards.

Barker is critical of organised religion, but has said that the Bible influences his work and spirituality. In 2017, he clarified on Facebook that he did not identify as a Christian.

Barker said in a December 2008 online interview (published in March 2009) that he had throat polyps which were so severe that a doctor told him he was taking in only 10% of the air he was supposed to. He has had two surgical procedures to remove them and believes his voice has improved as a result. He said he did not have cancer and has given up cigars.

In 2012, Barker fell into a coma for several days after contracting toxic shock syndrome, triggered by a visit to a dentist where a spillage of poisonous bacteria entered his bloodstream and almost killed him. Realising he might have just a short time to live, he decided to put his personal concerns about the world and society into the novel Deep Hill, which he thought could be his final book.

As of 2015, Barker is a member of the board of advisers for the Hollywood Horror Museum.

In August 2026, Barker announced on his Kickstarter project that he was returning to fiction after a period of ill health.

== Film work ==
Barker wrote the screenplays for Underworld (1985) and Rawhead Rex (1986), both directed by George Pavlou. Displeased by how his material was handled, he moved to directing with Hellraiser (1987), based on his novella The Hellbound Heart. After his film Nightbreed (1990) flopped, Barker returned to write and direct Lord of Illusions (1995). The short story "The Forbidden", from Barker's Books of Blood, provided the basis for the 1992 film Candyman and its three sequels. He had been working on a series of film adaptations of his The Abarat Quintet books under The Walt Disney Company's management, but due to creative differences, the project was cancelled.

He served as an executive producer for the 1998 film Gods and Monsters, a semi-fictional tale of Frankenstein director James Whale's later years, which won an Academy Award for Best Adapted Screenplay. Barker said of his interest in the project: "Whale was gay, I'm gay; Whale was English, I'm English…Whale made some horror movies, and I've made some horror movies. It seemed as if I should be helping to tell this story." Barker also provided the foreword on the published shooting script.

In 2005, Barker and horror film producer Jorge Saralegui created the film production company Midnight Picture Show with the intent of producing two horror films per year.

In October 2006, Barker announced through his website that he will be writing the script to a forthcoming remake of the original Hellraiser film. He was developing a film based on his Tortured Souls line of toys from McFarlane Toys. In 2020, Barker regained control of the Hellraiser franchise, and served as executive producer on a 2022 reboot film for the streaming service Hulu.

== Television work ==
In May 2015, Variety reported that Clive Barker was developing a television series adaptation of various creepypastas in partnership with Warner Brothers, to be called Clive Barker's Creepypastas, a feature arc based on Slender Man and Ben Drowned. Barker was involved in a streaming service film adaptation of The Books of Blood in 2020, and is developing a Nightbreed television series directed by Michael Dougherty and written by Josh Stolberg for SyFy. In April 2020, HBO was announced to be developing a Hellraiser television series that would serve as "an elevated continuation and expansion" of its mythology with Mark Verheiden and Michael Dougherty writing the series and David Gordon Green directing several episodes. Verheiden, Dougherty and Green will also be executive producing the series with Danny McBride, Jody Hill, Brandon James and Roy Lee of Vertigo Entertainment.

== Visual art ==
Barker is a prolific visual artist, often illustrating his own books. His paintings have been seen first on the covers of his official fan club magazine, Dread, published by Fantaco in the early 1990s; on the covers of the collections of his plays, Incarnations (1995) and Forms of Heaven (1996); and on the second printing of the original British publications of his Books of Blood series. Barker also provided the artwork for his young adult novel The Thief of Always and for the Abarat series. His artwork has been exhibited at Bert Green Fine Art in Los Angeles and Chicago, at the Bess Cutler Gallery in New York and La Luz De Jesus in Los Angeles. Many of his sketches and paintings can be found in the collection Clive Barker, Illustrator, published in 1990 by Arcane/Eclipse Books, and in Visions of Heaven and Hell, published in 2005 by Rizzoli Books.

He worked on the horror video game Clive Barker's Undying, providing the voice for the character Ambrose. Undying was developed by DreamWorks Interactive and released in 2001. He worked on Clive Barker's Jericho for Codemasters, which was released in late 2007.

Barker created Halloween costume designs for Disguise Costumes.

Around 150 art works by Barker were used in the set of the Academy of the Unseen Arts for the Netflix TV series Chilling Adventures of Sabrina.

== Comic books ==
Barker published his Razorline imprint via Marvel Comics in 1993.

Barker horror adaptations and spin-offs in comics include the Marvel/Epic Comics series Hellraiser, Nightbreed, Pinhead, The Harrowers, Book of the Damned, and Jihad; Eclipse Books' series and graphic novels Tapping The Vein, Dread, Son of Celluloid, Revelations, The Life of Death, Rawhead Rex and The Yattering and Jack, and Dark Horse Comics' Primal, among others. Barker served as a consultant and wrote issues of the Hellraiser anthology comic book.

In 2005, IDW published a three-issue adaptation of Barker's children's fantasy novel The Thief of Always, written and painted by Kris Oprisko and Gabriel Hernandez. IDW is publishing a 12 issue adaptation of Barker's novel The Great and Secret Show.

In December 2007, Chris Ryall and Clive Barker announced an upcoming collaboration of an original comic book series, Torakator, to be published by IDW.

In 2008, Barker authored a foreword for the first volume of the DEMONICSEX comic series by Chuck Conner and Sean Platter.

In October 2009, IDW published Seduth, co-written by Barker. The work was released with three variant covers.

In 2011, Boom! Studios began publishing an original Hellraiser comic book series.

In 2013, Boom! Studios announced Next Testament, the first original story by Barker to be published in comic book format.

== Works ==
=== Novels ===
- The Damnation Game (1985)
- Weaveworld (1987)
- Cabal (1988) (Novella)
- Imajica (1991)
- The Thief of Always (1992)
- Sacrament (1996)
- Galilee (1998)
- Coldheart Canyon (2001)
- Tortured Souls (2001). Novelette starring the characters of the series of first six action figures of Tortured Souls. In 2015 it was published with title Tortured Souls: The Legend of Primordium.
- The Infernal Parade (2004). Novelette detailing the backstories of the characters of the series of six action figures of The Infernal Parade. In 2017 it was published with title Infernal Parade.
- Mister B. Gone (2007)
- Mr. Maximillian Bacchus And His Travelling Circus (2009)
- Chiliad: A Meditation (2014)

==== Hellraiser series ====
1. The Hellbound Heart (1986), novella
2. The Scarlet Gospels (2015)
3. Hellraiser: The Toll (2018) (Story credit; Barker's unfinished short story "Heaven's Reply" served as a basis for the novella, which was authored by Mark Alan Miller)

==== Books of the Art series ====
1. The Great and Secret Show (1989)
2. Everville (1994)

==== The Books of Abarat ====
1. Abarat (2002)
2. Days of Magic, Nights of War (2004)
3. Absolute Midnight (2011)

=== Short stories ===
Collections:

- Books of Blood:
  1. Books of Blood: Volume One (1984), ISBN 978-0-425-08389-5, collection of 1 short story and 5 novelettes:
    "The Book of Blood", "The Midnight Meat Train" (novelette), "The Yattering and Jack" (novelette), "Pig Blood Blues" (novelette), "Sex, Death and Starshine" (novelette), "In the Hills, the Cities" (novelette)
  2. Books of Blood, Volume Two, or Books of Blood, Volume II (1984), ISBN 978-0-7221-1413-1, collection of 5 novelettes:
    "Dread", "Hell's Event", "Jacqueline Ess: Her Will And Testament", "The Skins of the Fathers", "New Murders in the Rue Morgue"
  3. Books of Blood, Volume Three, or Books of Blood 3 (1984), ISBN 978-0-7515-1169-7, collection of 5 novelettes:
    "Son of Celluloid", "Rawhead Rex", "Confessions of a (Pornographer's) Shroud", "Scape-Goats", "Human Remains"
  4. Books of Blood: Volume IV, or The Inhuman Condition (1985), ISBN 978-0-7221-1373-8, collection of 1 short story and 4 novelettes/novellas:
    "The Body Politic" (novelette), "The Inhuman Condition" (novelette), "Revelations" (novella), "Down, Satan!", "The Age of Desire" (novella)
  5. Books of Blood: Volume V, or In the Flesh (1985), ISBN 978-0-7221-1374-5, collection of 4 novelettes/novellas:
    "The Forbidden" (novelette), "The Madonna" (novelette), "Babel's Children" (novelette), "In the Flesh" (novella)
  6. Books of Blood: Volume VI, or Books of Blood 6 (1985), ISBN 978-0-7221-1375-2, collection of 1 short story and 4 novelettes/novellas:
    "The Life of Death" (novelette), "How Spoilers Bleed" (novelette), "Twilight at the Towers" (novelette), "The Last Illusion" (novella), "On Jerusalem Street"
- The Essential Clive Barker: Selected Fiction (1999), ISBN 978-0-06-019529-8, collection of more than seventy excerpts from novels and plays and four full-length stories (1 short story and 3 novelettes):
  "The Departed", "The Forbidden" (novelette), "In the Hills, the Cities" (novelette), "Jacqueline Ess: Her Will and Testament" (novelette)
- Clive Barker's First Tales (2013), ISBN 978-1-311-69351-8, collection of 1 short story and 1 novella:
  "The Wood on the Hill", "The Candle in the Cloud" (novella)
- Tonight, Again: Tales of Love, Lust and Everything in Between (2015), ISBN 978-1-59606-694-6, collection of 24 short stories and 7 poems:
  "Tonight, Again", "I Love You" (poem), "Craw: A Fable", "Afraid", "Moved", "I Imagine You", "If the Pen Is the Penis" (poem), "Touch the Rod" (poem), "Martha", "Tit", "The Freaks", "Cruelty" (poem), "Dollie", "The Collection", "What May Not Be Shown", "Two Views from a Window", "Men in the Aisles of Supermarkets" (poem), "A Blessing", "Unrequited", "Another Genesis", "Inside Out (Wasteland)", "I Have My Art" (poem), "Aurora", "Whistling in the Dark", "The Common Flesh", "Mr. Fred Coady Professes His Undying Love for His Little Sylvia", "The Phone Call", "The Multitude", "A Monster Lies in Wait" (poem), "An Incident at the Nunnery", "The Genius of Denny Dan"
- Fear Eternal (2027)
- Pyres of Bedlam (2027)
- Dark Descents (2027)

Uncollected short stories:

- "Lost Souls" (1986)
- "Coming to Grief" (1988), novelette
- "The Rhapsodist" (1988)
- "Nightbreed" (1990), screenplay for the film, based on novel Cabal
- "Pidgin and Theresa" (1993)
- "Animal Life" (1994)
- "Sacrament" (1996), novelette
- "Haeckel's Tale" (2005)
- "How Mr. Maximillian Bacchus' Travelling Circus Reached Cathay, and Entertained the Court of the Khan Called Kublai In Xanadu, How They Sought the Bearded Bird, and How, At Last, Angelo Was Lost" (2009)
- "How the Clown Domingo de Y Barrondo Fell Over the Edge of the World" (2009)
- "The Face of the Flying Fish and Why Docor Jozabiah Bentham's Theatre of Tears Sailed North" (2009)
- "The Wedding of Indigo Murphy To the Duke Lorenzo de Medici and How Angelo Was Discovered in an Orchard" (2009)
- "And So with Cries" (2009)
- "A Night's Work" (2013)

=== Plays ===
Collections:

- Incarnations: Three Plays (1995), collection of 3 plays:
  "Colossus", "Frankenstein in love or The Life of death", "The History of the Devil or Scenes from a Pretended Life"
- Forms of Heaven: Three Plays (1996), collection of 3 plays:
  "Crazyface", "Paradise Street", "Subtle Bodies"

All plays:

- A Clowns' Sodom (The Mute Pantomime Theatre, 1976)
- Day of the Dog (The Mute Pantomime Theatre, 1977)
- The Sack (The Dog Company, 1978)
- The Magician (The Dog Company, 1978)
- Dog (The Dog Company, 1979)
- Nightlives (The Dog Company, 1979)
- History of the Devil (The Dog Company, 1980)
- Dangerous World (The Dog Company, 1981)
- Paradise Street (The Dog Company, 1981)
- Frankenstein in Love (The Dog Company, 1982)
- The Secret Life of Cartoons (The Dog Company, 1982)
- Crazyface (Cockpit Youth Theatre, 1982)
- Subtle Bodies (Cockpit Youth Theatre, 1983)
- Colossus (Cockpit Youth Theatre, 1983)

=== Poems ===
Uncollected poems:

- "Six Commonplaces (from Weaveworld)" (1987), published in Fantasy Tales, V9n17, Summer 1987
- "There Was A Time" (2010), published in Multiverses by Preston Grassmann, ed.
- "The Hour" (2021), published in Out of the Ruins by Preston Grassmann, ed.
- "The Presence of This Breath" (TBA)
- "Upon A Warm Milk Dawn" (2024), published in The Mad Butterfly's Ball by Preston Grassmann and Chris Kelso, ed.

=== Non-fiction ===
Art

- Clive Barker, Illustrator series:
  1. Clive Barker, Illustrator (1990)
  2. Illustrator II: The Art of Clive Barker (1992)
- Visions of Heaven and Hell (2005)
- Clive Barker: Imaginer series:
  1. Clive Barker: Imaginer Volume 1 (2014)
  2. Clive Barker: Imaginer Volume 2 (2015)
  3. Clive Barker: Imaginer Volume 3 (2016)
  4. Clive Barker: Imaginer Volume 4 (2017)
  5. Clive Barker: Imaginer Volume 5 (2018)
  6. Clive Barker: Imaginer Volume 6 (2018)
  7. Clive Barker: Imaginer Volume 7 (2020)
  8. Clive Barker: Imaginer Volume 8 (2020)

Essays

- The Painter, The Creature and The Father of Lies (2011)

=== Toys ===
- Tortured Souls (2001–2002). Series of 12 action figures (six designed in 2001 and six in 2002) and a novelette starring the characters of the first six action figures
- The Infernal Parade (2004) Co-created with Todd McFarlane, series of six action figures and a novelette detailing the backstories of the characters.
- Jump Tribe (2005) 4 Plushies.

== Literary awards ==
Work	Year & Award	Category	Result	Ref.
In the Hills, the Cities	1985 British Fantasy Award	Short Story	Won	
Clive Barker's Books of Blood (Vols. I-III)	1985 Locus Award	Collection	Nominated	
Clive Barker's Books of Blood (Vols. I-III)	1985 World Fantasy Award	Anthology/Collection	Won	
Jacqueline Ess: Her Will and Testament	1985 World Fantasy Award	Novella	Nominated	
The Damnation Game	1986 Locus Award	Fantasy	Nominated	
The Damnation Game	1986 World Fantasy Award	Novel	Nominated	
The Damnation Game	1987 Bram Stoker Award	First Novel	Nominated	
Clive Barker's Books of Blood (Vols. IV-VI))	1986 Locus Award	Collection	Nominated	
Clive Barker's Books of Blood (Vols. IV-VI))	1986 World Fantasy Award	Anthology/Collection	Nominated	
The Forbidden	1986 British Fantasy Award	Short Story	Won	
The Hellbound Heart	1987 World Fantasy Award	Novella	Nominated	
Weaveworld	1988 Locus Award	Fantasy	Nominated	
Weaveworld	1988 World Fantasy Award	Novel	Nominated	
Weaveworld	1990 Prix Cosmos 2000	Novel	Won	
Cabal	1989 Locus Award	Novella	Nominated	
Cabal (Collection)	1989 Locus Award	Collection	Nominated	
Cabal (Collection)	1989 World Fantasy Award	Collection	Nominated	
The Great and Secret Show	1990 Locus Award	Horror	Nominated	
Imajica	1992 Locus Award	Horror/Dark Fantasy	Nominated	
Imajica	1997 Prix Julia Verlanger	Foreign Novel	Won	
Imajica	1998 Grand Prix de l'Imaginaire	Foreign Novel	Won	
The Thief of Always	1993 Locus Award	Horror/Dark Fantasy	Nominated	
The Thief of Always	1995 Grand Prix de l'Imaginaire	Youth Novel	Won	
The Thief of Always	1996 Kurd Laßwitz Award	Foreign Work	Nominated	
Everville	1995 Locus Award	Horror/Dark Fantasy	Nominated	
Sacrament	1996 International Horror Guild Award	Novel	Nominated	
Sacrament	1997 Lambda Literary Award for Speculative Fiction	Science Fiction/Fantasy	Won	
Sacrament	1997 British Fantasy Award	August Derleth Award	Nominated	
Sacrament	1997 Locus Award	Horror/Dark Fantasy	Nominated	
Galilee	1999 Locus Award	Horror/Dark Fantasy	Nominated	
Galilee	1999 Lambda Literary Award for Speculative Fiction	Science Fiction/Fantasy	Nominated	
Galilee	2001 Prix Masterton	Foreign Novel	Won	
Galilee	2001 Prix Ozone	Foreign Horror Novel	Won	
Coldheart Canyon	2001 International Horror Guild Award	Novel	Nominated	
Coldheart Canyon	2002 Locus Award	Fantasy	Nominated	
Coldheart Canyon	2005 Prix Masterton	Foreign Novel	Won	
Abarat	2002 Bram Stoker Award	Work for Young Readers	Nominated	
Abarat	2002 International Horror Guild Award	Graphic Narrative	Won	
Abarat	2003 Locus Award	Young Adult	Nominated	
Abarat: Days of Magic, Nights of War	2004 Bram Stoker Award	Work for Young Readers	Won	
Abarat: Days of Magic, Nights of War	2005 Locus Award	Young Adult	Nominated	
Abarat: Days of Magic, Nights of War	2005 British Fantasy Award	August Derleth Award	Nominated	
Abarat: Days of Magic, Nights of War	2005 Prix Imaginales	Youth Fantasy Novel	Won	
Haeckel's Tale	2005 Bram Stoker Award	Short Fiction	Nominated	
Visions of Heaven and Hell	2006 Locus Award	Art Book	Nominated	
Abarat: Absolute Midnight	2012 Locus Award	Young Adult	Nominated	
The Scarlet Gospels	2015 Goodreads Choice Awards	Horror	Nominated	
The Scarlet Gospels	2015 Bram Stoker Award	Novel	Nominated	
	1991 Inkpot Award		Won	
	1995 World Horror Convention Grand Master Award		Won	
	1995 International Horror Guild Award	Living Legend Award	Won	
	2013 Bram Stoker Award	Lifetime Achievement Award	Won	
	2026 World Fantasy Awards	Lifetime Achievement Award	Won	

== Filmography ==
Film
Year	Title	Director	Writer	Producer	Notes
1985	Underworld	No	Yes	No	
1986	Rawhead Rex	No	Yes	No	based on Barker's short story "Rawhead Rex"
1987	Hellraiser	Yes	Yes	No	based on Barker's novella The Hellbound Heart
1988	Hellbound: Hellraiser II	No	Story	Executive	
1990	Nightbreed	Yes	Yes	No	based on Barker's novella Cabal
1992	Sleepwalkers	No	No	No	Barker has an acting credit as "Forensic Tech"
1992	Hellraiser III: Hell on Earth	No	No	Executive	
1992	Candyman	No	Story	Executive	based on Barker's short story "The Forbidden"
1995	Candyman: Farewell to the Flesh	No	Story	Executive	
1995	Lord of Illusions	Yes	Yes	Yes	based on Barker's short story "The Last Illusion"
1996	Hellraiser: Bloodline	No	No	Executive	
1998	Gods and Monsters	No	No	Executive	
2006	The Plague	No	No	Yes	
2008	The Midnight Meat Train	No	No	Yes	based on Barker's short story "The Midnight Meat Train"
2009	Book of Blood	No	No	Yes	based on Barker's short stories "The Book of Blood" & "On Jerusalem Street"
2009	Dread	No	No	Yes	based on Barker's short story "Dread"
2019	JoJo Baby	No	No	Executive	
2020	Books of Blood	No	No	Executive	based on Barker's short story "The Book of Blood"
2022	Hellraiser	No	No	Yes	based on Barker's novella The Hellbound Heart
2025	Night of the Zoopocalypse	No	No	Executive	based on Barker's short story "Zoombies"

Television
Year	Title	Writer	Producer	Notes
1987	Tales From The Darkside	Yes	No	episode: "The Yattering and Jack"
1997	Quicksilver Highway	Story	No	TV movie, based on Barker's short story "The Body Politic", Barker has an acting credit as "Anesthesiologist"
2002	Saint Sinner	Story	Executive	TV movie
2006	Masters of Horror	Story	No	episodes: "Haeckel's Tale" & "Valerie on the Stairs"

Shorts
Year	Title	Director	Writer	Actor	Notes
1973	Salome	Yes	Yes	Yes	based on the play
1978	The Forbidden	Yes	Yes	Yes	

== Adaptations ==
- Rawhead Rex (1986), film directed by George Pavlou, based on novelette "Rawhead Rex"
- Hellraiser (1987), film directed by Clive Barker, based on novella The Hellbound Heart
- Hellbound: Hellraiser II (1988), film directed by Tony Randel, based on characters from the novella The Hellbound Heart
- Nightbreed (1990), film directed by Clive Barker, based on novella Cabal
- Hellraiser III: Hell on Earth (1992), film directed by Anthony Hickox, based on characters from the novella The Hellbound Heart
- Candyman (1992), film directed by Bernard Rose, based on novelette "The Forbidden"
- Candyman: Farewell to the Flesh (1995), film directed by Bill Condon, based on characters from the novelette "The Forbidden"
- Lord of Illusions (1995), film directed by Clive Barker, based on novella "The Last Illusion"
- Hellraiser: Bloodline (1996), film directed by Kevin Yagher and Joe Chapelle, based on characters from the novella The Hellbound Heart
- "The Body Politic", first story of the TV movie Quicksilver Highway (1997) directed by Mick Garris, based on novelette "The Body Politic"
- Candyman 3: Day of the Dead (1999), film directed by Turi Meyer, based on characters from the novelette "The Forbidden"
- Hellraiser: Inferno (2000), film directed by Scott Derrickson, based on characters from the novella The Hellbound Heart
- Hellraiser: Hellseeker (2002), film directed by Rick Bota, based on characters from the novella The Hellbound Heart
- Hellraiser: Deader (2005), film directed by Rick Bota, based on characters from the novella The Hellbound Heart
- Hellraiser: Hellworld (2005), film directed by Rick Bota, based on characters from the novella The Hellbound Heart
- Hellraiser: Prophecy (2006), fan film directed by Jonathan S. Kui, based on characters from the novella The Hellbound Heart
- "Haeckel's Tale" (2006), episode from Masters of Horror, based on short story "Haeckel's Tale"
- The Midnight Meat Train (2008), film directed by Ryuhei Kitamura, based on novelette "The Midnight Meat Train"
- Hellraiser: Deader – Winter's Lament (2009), fan film directed by Jonathan S. Kui, based on characters from the novella The Hellbound Heart
- Dread (2009), film directed by Anthony DiBlasi, based on novelette "Dread"
- Book of Blood (2009), film directed by John Harrison, based on short stories "The Book of Blood" and "On Jerusalem Street"
- Hellraiser: Revelations (2011), film directed by Víctor Garcia, based on characters from the novella The Hellbound Heart
- Hellraiser: Judgment (2018), film directed by Gary J. Tunnicliffe, based on characters from the novella The Hellbound Heart
- Chatterer: A Hellraiser Fan Film (2020), fan film directed by Nicholas Michael Jacobs, based on characters from the novella The Hellbound Heart
- "Miles", second story of the TV movie Books of Blood (2020) directed by Brannon Braga, based on short story "The Book of Blood"
- "Bennett", third story of the TV movie Books of Blood (2020) directed by Brannon Braga, based on short story "On Jerusalem Street"
- Candyman (2021), film directed by Nia DaCosta, based on characters from the novelette "The Forbidden"
- Hellraiser (2022), film directed by David Bruckner, based on novella The Hellbound Heart
- The Thief of Always (upcoming), film to be directed by Jennifer Kent, based on the novel The Thief of Always

== Video games ==
Year	Title	Developer
1990	Clive Barker's Nightbreed: The Action Game	Impact Software Development
1990	Nightbreed, The Interactive Movie	Impact Software Development
2001	Clive Barker's Undying	EA Los Angeles
2007	Clive Barker's Jericho	MercurySteam; Alchemic Productions
2026	Clive Barker's Hellraiser: Revival	Saber Interactive
Cancelled	Clive Barker's Demonik	Terminal Reality

== See also ==
- Cenobite
- Clive Barker's unrealized projects
- Lemarchand's box
- List of horror fiction writers
- Splatterpunk

== Sources ==
- Andrew Smith, "Worlds That Creep upon You: Postmodern Illusions in the Work of Clive Barker". In Clive Bloom, ed., Creepers: British Horror and Fantasy in the Twentieth Century. London and Boulder, CO: Pluto Press, 1993, pp. 176–86.
- Suzanne J. Barbieri, Clive Barker: Mythmaker for the Millennium. Stockport, UK: British Fantasy Society, 1994, ISBN 0-9524153-0-5. OCLC 32131027.
- Gary Hoppenstand, Clive Barker's Short Stories: Imagination as Metaphor in the Books of Blood and Other Works. (With a foreword by Clive Barker). Jefferson, N.C.: McFarland, 1994, ISBN 0-89950-984-3.
- Linda Badley, Writing Horror and the Body: The Fiction of Stephen King, Clive Barker, and Anne Rice. London: Greenwood Press, 1996, ISBN 0-313-29716-9.
- Chris Morgan, "Barker, Clive", in David Pringle, ed., St. James Guide to Horror, Ghost and Gothic Writers. London: St. James Press, 1998, ISBN 1-55862-206-3
- S. T. Joshi, The Modern Weird Tale. Jefferson, N.C., London: McFarland, 2001, ISBN 0-7864-0986-X.
- Douglas E. Winter, Clive Barker: The Dark Fantastic. New York: Harper, 2002, ISBN 0-06-621392-4.
- Edwin F. Casebeer, "Clive Barker (1952–)" in: Darren Harris-Fain (ed.) British Fantasy and Science Fiction Writers Since 1960. Farmington Hills, MI: Thomson/Gale, 2002, ISBN 0-7876-6005-1.
- K. A. Laity, "Clive Barker" in: Richard Bleiler, ed. Supernatural Fiction Writers: Contemporary Fantasy and Horror. New York: Thomson/Gale, 2003, ISBN 0-684-31250-6.
- Sorcha Ní Fhlainn (ed.). Clive Barker: Dark imaginer. Manchester: Manchester University Press, 2017. 280pp. ISBN 978-0-7190-9692-1.
