= Clive Barker, Illustrator =

Book by Clive Barker

Clive Barker, Illustrator is a book of ink sketches and some full-color paintings by British author Clive Barker. It was published in 1990 by Arcane/Eclipse Books. It also contains a lengthy interview with Barker, in which he talks about the various aspects of his work. As with his fiction, his artwork is concerned with mythology, monstrous figures, the grotesque, human sexuality, and secret identities. He also discusses his influences, which range from Jean Cocteau, Goya and William Blake to various Disney films.

There is also a follow-up volume, Illustrator II: The Art of Clive Barker.
