= Galilee (novel) =

1998 novel by Clive Barker

- Author: Clive Barker
- Language: English
- Genre: Romance, fantasy
- Publisher: HarperCollins
- Publication date: 1998
- Publication place: United States
- Media type: Print
- Pages: 582 p.
- ISBN: 9780060179472
- OCLC: 317819985

Galilee is a novel by British writer Clive Barker, published in 1998 by HarperCollins Publishers. It chronicles the rise and fall of two very different, but equally powerful dynasties. The first dynasty, the Gearys, are a glamorous and rich family, similar to the Kennedys, who have been a power in America since the Reconstruction. The Barbarossas are a family of godlike beings. The two parents, Cesaria and Nicodemus, came into existence during the Bronze Age, somewhere between Canaan and the city of Samarkand. They have since had four children, the eldest of which is the titular Galilee.

== Plot summary ==
The novel begins with an introduction to the manor of L'Enfant where Cesaria lives along with three of her children, Marietta, Zabrina and Luman. Also living there is Edmund Maddox, the son of Nicodemus and a human woman. Maddox had been crippled in an accident many years before which also resulted in the death of Nicodemus and Maddox's wife, Chiyojo. Maddox decides to write a book telling of the conflict between the Gearys and the Barbarossas and when brought to a dome at the top of L'Enfant is provided back the usage of his legs along with new knowledge that enables him to tell the story. Throughout the novel the reader is told various stories involving Maddox and his half-siblings.

The story initially begins with the baptism of Galilee and how a witness named Zelim became a prophet and eventually a spirit bound to Cesaria. In the present day, Maddox tells the story of how Rachel Pallenberg met Mitchell Geary and married him. The Geary family is led by Mitchell's grandfather Cadmus, who while aged came back into power over the family after the mysterious murder of Mitchell's father George. Things are initially happy for Rachel, and she befriends much of the fellow women in the Geary family including Margie, wife to Mitchell's older brother Garrison. However, after a couple of years of marriage being married to Michell loses its luster. Things appear to be improving when Rachel becomes pregnant, but she suffers from a miscarriage and is told she can't have any more children. She decides that she wants to leave Mitchell and tells him so after a visit to her hometown in Ohio. The two of them decide to wait a few weeks before making a final decision.

Margie tells Rachel of a house in Hawaii that is specifically meant for the usage of the Geary women. Rachel heads there and encounters a man named Niolopua, and sees Galilee arrive on his boat, the Samarkand. Galilee tells Rachel a story of a water god and later brings her on his boat. The two fall in love, but fight after Rachel receives a message about Margie being murdered by Garrison. Rachel returns to the U.S. while Galilee decides to kill himself by heading out on the Samarkand without supplies and leaving himself to the elements. Upon her return to the U.S., Rachel meets Danny, a former lover of Margie's and agrees to take back some letters and pictures of his that were left in Margie's apartment. There, she also finds a diary written by a man named Charles Holt from the Civil War.

Rachel reads Holt's diary, telling of his experiences after the war with a cook named Nickleberry. They encounter a man named Galilee who Rachel soon realizes is the same Galilee in the present day when she reads of the same story that he told her when they first met. Meanwhile, Garrison, who has been released from prison, and Mitchell desire to destroy the Barbarossas and believe they can find their way to L'Enfant through the diary. Mitchell is eventually able to steal the diary from Rachel. With Cadmus close to death, Cesaria desires to see it and emits herself there, where she causes Cadmus to self-mutilate and die shortly afterwards. Rachel witnesses this and decides to return to Galilee. Meanwhile, Mitchell desires to have Rachel back and also heads there. Cesaria appears before Galilee and based on her encounter with Rachel convinces him to return to her. She summons a storm which causes the Samarkand to crash ashore. Rachel and Niolopua are able to find him and bring him back to their house. Mitchell meanwhile, who has brought a knife with him arrives and murders Niolopua, and tries to do the same to Galilee. The spirits of various Geary women appear however and he falls down the stairs, accidentally being stabbed by his knife and dies.

Galilee agrees to reveal how everything came about to Rachel. After encountering Holt and Nickleberry, Galilee traveled with them and was nearly killed by a mob, being saved by Nickleberry. The three of them arrive at L'Enfant but wear out their welcome. Holt kills himself while Galilee and Nickleberry depart. Galilee, feeling indebted to Nickleberry agrees to help make him rich. Nickleberry steals the identity of a dead soldier named Geary and with Galilee doing nefarious deeds for him becomes rich and powerful. He eventually marries a woman named Bedelia but is unable to satisfy her so Galilee assists. Galilee eventually runs away with Bedelia and she gives birth to Niolopua, but she eventually returns. On her death bed, years later, she makes the two of them agree that Galilee will always be there to comfort the Geary women at his house in Hawaii and he will no longer be bound to doing anything else for the Gearys. Wanting to make Rachel immortal, Galilee brings her to L'Enfant where and they see Cesaria, who forgives Galilee. Maddox meanwhile, having finished his book leaves L'Enfant to see the world.

== Reception ==
=== Reviews ===
Douglas E. Winter of F&SF wrote Barker's "everexpansive aesthetic and stylistic pursuits find an ideal structure, producing his most controlled and widely appealing novel." Publishers Weekly wrote that it features a "new richness of character, of its warpings and transfigurations by hatred and love, blood legacy and death." Kirkus Reviews called the novel "overheated and intermittently risible" yet "entertaining".

=== Awards and nominations ===
In 1999 the book was nominated for the Locus Award for best horror/dark fantasy novel, as well as the Lambda Literary Awards for speculative fiction. In 2001 it won the French Prix Masterton for best foreign novel, and the Prix Ozone for best foreign horror novel.
