= Coldheart Canyon =

2001 novel by Clive Barker

- Author: Clive Barker
- Publisher: HarperCollins
- Publication date: 2 October 2001
- Award: Audie Award for Solo Narration - Male (2002)
- ISBN: 978-0-060-18297-7

Coldheart Canyon is a novel by Clive Barker, published in 2001 by HarperCollins. The story centers on Todd Pickett, a failing movie star, and Tammy Lauper, Todd's obsessive fan.

== Synopsis ==
The story begins in Romania during the 1920s, where poverty and disease run rampant. American talent agent Willem Zeffer and the Romanian-born actress he represents, Katya Lupi, have travelled there in order to visit Katya's relatives. Zeffer visits an old medieval castle which has been turned into a monastery and decides to buy a unique work of art, a series of sculpted and painted tiles depicting, in a grotesque and obscene manner, the local legend of a Count who was cursed to haunt the nearby wilderness for all eternity.

The second part of the story begins in the year 2000, when failing movie star Todd Pickett decides to undergo plastic surgery to make himself look younger as prelude to his professional comeback. Something goes wrong during the surgery, and Todd, now disfigured, is forced to go into hiding during his recovery. His agent selects Katya Lupi's former home, an abandoned house in Coldheart Canyon, a secluded area outside Hollywood, where Todd soon discovers that Katya and her "subjects" still hold court.

== Reception ==
=== Reviews ===
Coldheart Canyon received favorable reviews. Publishers Weekly called it "one of the most accomplished, and most notable, novels of the year". Kirkus Reviews said, "If you can tolerate Barker at his most fantastical and effusive, you won’t want to miss Coldheart Canyon." Booklist also reviewed the novel.

=== Awards and nominations ===
In 2001 the book was nominated for the International Horror Guild award for best novel. In 2002, it won the French Prix Masterton for best foreign novel, and was nominated for the Locus Award for best horror/dark fantasy novel.

in 2002 the audiobook won the Audie Award for Solo Narration - Male.
