= Weaveworld =

1987 dark fantasy novel by Clive Barker

- First UK edition
- Author: Clive Barker
- Language: English
- Genre: Dark fantasy, horror
- Publisher: Collins (UK); Poseidon Press (US)
- Publication date: 1987
- Publication place: United Kingdom
- Media type: Print (hardcover)
- Pages: 672
- ISBN: 0-00-223271-5

Weaveworld is a 1987 dark fantasy novel by English writer Clive Barker. It is about a magical world, known as the Fugue, which has been hidden inside a carpet to safeguard it from both inquisitive humans and hostile supernatural foes. Two humans become embroiled in the fate of the Fugue, attempting to save it from those who seek to destroy it. The book was nominated in 1988 for the World Fantasy Award for Best Novel.

== Background ==
In 2000, Clive Barker stated in an interview with USA Today that the story of Weaveworld came from a gift. He says: "The story originates with a particular carpet, which was a gift to me from my ex-art teacher. I stared at it for many weeks, certain there was something waiting in its weave. There was. A novel."

== Plot summary ==
Decades prior to the book's opening, a magical race known as the Seerkind combined all of their powers to create a secret world known as "the Fugue", a carpet into which they wove their most beloved locations, animals, possessions and themselves as a safe haven. Their aim was to avoid persecution by humans (who call them demons and fairies) and eradication by a destructive being known as the Scourge. This creature's nature is entirely unknown to the Seerkind, as no-one has survived to describe it. The Fugue, resembling an ordinary, albeit exquisitely woven, carpet is left in the care of a human woman, Mimi Laschenski, who married one of the Seerkind and resides in Liverpool, England.

Mimi reaches old age and is hospitalised following a stroke. A young man named Calhoun Mooney, chasing an escaped homing pigeon, accidentally glimpses the Fugue hidden in the carpet, which profoundly affects him. Simultaneously, Mimi's granddaughter Suzanna Parrish arrives in the city at Mimi's behest. The mystery surrounding Mimi and the full potential of the carpet brings Cal and Suzanna together and quickly into confrontation with the primary antagonists: Immacolata, an exiled and extremely powerful member of the Seerkind bent on revenge; Shadwell, a human salesman with limitless ambition; and Hobart, an overzealous police inspector.

Cal and Suzanna acquire new allies and abilities in their goal of protecting the Fugue from destruction, venturing into it themselves twice. When Shadwell's actions result in the Fugue's seemingly total obliteration, the surviving Seerkind scatter. In a last desperate attempt to finish them, Shadwell locates and awakens the Scourge, which begins systematically destroying any and all traces of magic it can find.

Cal, Suzanna and their remaining allies make a final stand against Shadwell by using his own tactics against him and convince the Scourge to abandon its cause and leave the world in peace. In the aftermath, a severely traumatised Cal is cared for by Suzanna whilst their friends adjust to permanent life amongst humanity. Eventually, Cal emerges from his withdrawal with the knowledge that the Fugue is still in existence and can be restored to its full glory.

== Themes ==
Themes in Weaveworld include those of "monstrosity and innocence", and "the child predator", as well as those of dreams, desire, exile and the struggle between good and evil. Barker has said in interview with Fangoria in 1989 that he set out to write "a lost tribe story," a theme that has always preoccupied him. At the 1986 World Fantasy convention, he described the novel as: "a fantasy about why we want fantasy." And at UCLA in 1987, he referred to it as: "an erotic Wonderland."

== Reception ==
=== Reviews ===
The book was critically well-received, with Kirkus Reviews referring to it as: "the most ambitious and visionary horror novel of the decade", and Time magazine calling the story "irresistible", although Publishers Weekly was less fulsome, describing it as: "an unusual and not totally convincing mix of adventure and fairy tale."

Reviewing Weaveworld in the Toronto Star, Henry Mietkiewicz wrote that "Barker proves to be far more accomplished and self-assured than in any of his previous work...Weaveworld depends upon a relatively intricate narrative structure and a host of finely crafted characters".

Dave Langford reviewed Weaveworld for White Dwarf #96, and stated that "'dark fantasy' is today's posh word for 'horror'; Barker's considerable talents in this area lead to a few gobs of gratuitous nastiness and also some terrific creations".

=== Awards and nominations ===
The novel was nominated for the 1988 Locus Awards for Best Fantasy Novel, the 1988 World Fantasy Awards for Best Novel, and received the 1990 Prix littéraire Cosmos 2000.

== Comic book adaptation ==
Cover of Weaveworld #1, art by Mike Manley.

Weaveworld was made into a three-issue comic series in 1991 by Epic Comics. The series were written by Erik Saltzgaber and pencilled by Mike Manley. Clive Barker served as consultant.

== Mini-series adaptation ==
Novelist and screenwriter Michael Marshall Smith completed a first draft of a script for an eight-hour mini-series in 1995. Smith was later asked to write a complete script, but the project has fallen into hiatus and he is no longer involved. In 2001, Barker stated in an interview that a Showtime six-hour mini-series was about to enter a two-year preproduction stage, directed by Queer as Folk director Russell Mulcahy, probably shot in Australia.

In 2005, Barker said that the book had been adapted into a mini-series, and later said that the mini-series adaptation was about to enter production. In September 2015, CW network announced a TV series adaptation of the book, to be written and produced by Warehouse 13's Jack Kenny and produced by Clive Barker.
