= Sacrament (novel) =

1995 novel by Clive Barker

- Author: Clive Barker
- Language: English
- Genre: Fantasy novel
- Publisher: HarperCollins
- Publication date: 1996
- Publication place: United Kingdom
- Media type: Print (Paperback)
- ISBN: 0-00-648264-3
- OCLC: 43220287

Sacrament is a 1996 novel by British author Clive Barker. It follows a wildlife photographer who is obsessed with documenting species of animals that are faced with extinction. It is set in Yorkshire, England, San Francisco and Hudson Bay, Canada and explores how his obsession is connected to his upbringing in Yorkshire. The Author described it as "a story about how we become who we are and how we must deal with what we are by facing up to including the things that happened to us in childhood, good and bad. It's also about what's happening to our planet."

== Reception ==
=== Reviews ===
Kirkus Reviews wrote: "By turns suspenseful, intellectually exciting, wildly melodramatic, turgid, and bombastic, Barker's novel is charged—in its complex development and surprising resolution—with very real, very human emotion." Grant McKenzie of the Calgary Herald called the novel "heartwarming" yet "heartbreaking" and "uplifting as well as depressing."

=== Awards and nominations ===
In 1997 the book won the Lambda Literary Award for Speculative Fiction, and was nominated for the August Derleth Award for best novel, as well as the Locus Award for Best Horror/Dark Fantasy Novel.
