= Clive Barker's Jericho =

2007 video game

- Developers: MercurySteam; Alchemic Productions
- Publisher: Codemasters
- Director: Enric J. Álvarez Benito
- Producers: Rafael Martínez García; Clive Barker
- Designers: Luis Miguel Quijada Henares; José Darío Halle Cano; Ignacio Abad Donado-Mazarron
- Programmers: Carlos Rodríguez Butragueño; José Darío Halle Cano; José Antonio Martín Armayones
- Artist: Juan Antonio Alcázar Redondo
- Writer: Clive Barker
- Composers: Cris Velasco; Allister Brimble; Anthony N. Putson
- Platforms: Microsoft Windows; PlayStation 3; Xbox 360
- Release: NA: 23 October 2007; EU: 26 October 2007; AU: 7 November 2007 (PC); AU: 8 November 2007
- Genre: First-person shooter
- Mode: Single-player

Clive Barker's Jericho is a horror first-person shooter video game developed by MercurySteam and Alchemic Productions and published by Codemasters. It is produced by Clive Barker. The game was released for Microsoft Windows, PlayStation 3 and Xbox 360 in 2007.

== Gameplay ==
Jericho's core gameplay consists of leading the game's seven-man team codenamed Jericho, allowing control of all team members by jumping to each character during certain points in the game, through various environments that have been warped by the Firstborn while fighting off a variety of twisted creatures.

The game also features several quick time events where the player must press the corresponding buttons or keys shown on screen in order to successfully survive. Additionally, each team member has both a primary and a secondary attack, either in the form of an alternate fire such as a grenade launcher on a rifle, or a secondary weapon such as a sword or pistol that can be dual wielded. While the game is a first-person shooter, the ability to control different members of one's squad adds a tactical element; players must determine which squad member is appropriate for each particular job. Not only does each squad member have different strengths and weaknesses, but they also each have a unique ability (or supernatural abilities in some cases). This allows the player freedom in choosing a playing style that suits them throughout much of the game. However, during certain instances, certain characters are unplayable.

The squad's supernatural abilities play a prominent role in the game. The character the player originally controls is a psychic healer (medic) with the ability to fully heal fallen comrades that are close to death. Other squad members have other powers, such as summoning a fire demon, slowing time, firing a guided bullet, and leeching life from enemies to add it to one's own.

== Plot ==
=== Premise ===
Certain depictions and ancient scriptures dictate a being created by God in His own image before the creation of Adam and Eve; according to legend, this being was abandoned by its own Creator. In the game's mythology, this being is called the "Firstborn". God was so disturbed by what He created that He banished it into the Abyss. God then started anew and went on to create humankind, giving the species two sexes, feelings, and love.

The Firstborn, too powerful for even God to keep from breaking into the mortal world, would make seven attempts to escape, each time taking back a piece of the earth to add to its domain and each time sent back to the Abyss. Fragments of time and space would form layers around this domain, linked to this world in the city Al Khali. These layers would entrap pieces of history within its walls, from the time of the ancient Sumerians to World War II. Over time, other great conquerors and civilisations would arrive to claim the city as their own. Eventually, the city was forgotten and buried by the sands of time.

The Department of Occult Warfare was created in the 1930s to combat the supernatural and unexplained. Another purpose was to meet Nazi Germany's own research into the paranormal. One of their most brilliant members, Arnold Leach, was recruited in 1962. However, his unscrupulous behaviour and nature would eventually have him expelled. He was marked for assassination, and although the operation appeared to be successful, it seems that he may have survived.

The Jericho Squad is sent to Al-Khali to prevent Leach from opening the breach and unleashing the Firstborn upon mankind once again.

=== Story ===
The game's Jericho squad (l-r): Simone Cole, Abbey Black (crouching), Xavier Jones, Frank Delgado, Billie Church and Paul Rawlings

The game begins with General Arnold Leach, a high-ranking member of a secret U.S. organisation called the Department of Occult Warfare (DOW), being contacted by the Firstborn, a being that was imprisoned by God at the beginning of time in a patch of reality called the Box. The Firstborn convinces Leach to help it escape from the Box. Leach leaves the DOW, and spends the next twenty years committing acts of great evil to build up evil energy to cause a breach in the Box.

Eventually, a breach is made, and the DOW sends in a special forces team called Jericho to seal the breach. The leader of the squad, Captain Devin Ross, is killed by Leach, but he is still able to linger on as a ghost able to possess the other members of the squad. Being unable to seal it any other way, they enter the Box to close the breach from within.

Once inside, they must battle the souls of those who have breached the Box in the past; a Nazi officer, a fallen Catholic priest from the Middle Ages, a depraved Roman Governor, and six ancient Sumerian priests (Ninlil and Ki, Inanna and Enlil as well as Nanna and Utu, who were the first to banish the Firstborn but ultimately fell victim to its corruption). Jericho is aided by the souls of those who ultimately resealed the breach each time it was broken.

However, when they finally reach the point at which they can seal the breach, the squad instead decides that they should kill the Firstborn rather than try to reseal the breach, as resealing would just result in them being trapped in the Box and endlessly tortured until the breach was opened again just like as happened with all their past allies. Travelling into the Firstborn's cavern, they find the creature in the middle of an island on a lake, with Leach bound to a nearby wall. Before Cole could identify the Firstborn's weaknesses, the Firstborn kills Cole and Jones and battles the surviving squad members. Jericho manages to defeat the Firstborn by targeting it each time it tries to duplicate any of the squad's abilities. Leach breaks free of his bonds; angered at the Firstborn's betrayal, he grabs it and carries it to a tunnel of light, causing the cavern to collapse. Jericho jumps into the water and swims to escape. They emerge from under the water in a vast ocean under an orange sky.

== Reception ==
Reception

Aggregate score
Aggregator	Score		
Aggregator	PC	PS3	Xbox 360
Metacritic	63/100	60/100	63/100

Review scores
Publication	Score		
Publication	PC	PS3	Xbox 360
Destructoid	7/10	N/A	N/A
Edge	N/A	N/A	5/10
Electronic Gaming Monthly	N/A	4/10	4/10
Eurogamer	N/A	N/A	7/10
Game Informer	6/10	6/10	6/10
GameRevolution	C−	C−	C−
GameSpot	6.5/10	6.5/10	6.5/10
GameSpy	3/5	N/A	3/5
GameTrailers	N/A	5.9/10	5.9/10
GameZone	N/A	7.8/10	8/10
IGN	5.6/10	5.6/10	(UK) 8/10 (US) 5.6/10
Official Xbox Magazine (US)	N/A	N/A	7.5/10
PC Gamer (US)	57%	N/A	N/A
PlayStation: The Official Magazine	N/A	4/5	N/A

Clive Barker's Jericho received "mixed" reviews on all platforms according to video game review aggregator Metacritic. Many critics praised the squad-based system, elaborate storyline, Clive Barker's dark style and soundtrack while criticising the character AI, linear gameplay, abrupt ending and difficulty with certain game mechanics.

On the game's style, Eurogamer stated that "Clive Barker's contribution to the concept and narrative direction of the game will certainly help get the attention of horror fans" while GameSpot noted its "gorgeously creepy visuals and sound". Official Xbox Magazine praised the choice of characters, being "endless fun to switch tactics and experiment with different combinations of powers and weapons for crowd control". However, reviewers complained about the in-game mechanics. Among their criticisms were the poor AI, whereby teammates would die often, requiring the player to heal them regularly. IGN stated: "If the Jericho members' intelligence level wasn't enough of a nuisance for you, there's the actual shooting itself"; Jolt Online Gaming commented that the maps were too linear and close. Despite this, GamePro gave the Xbox 360 version a score of 4.5 out of 5, saying that the game's "slick style, amazing graphics, and dark atmosphere really make it stand out".

After being denied a rating in Germany Jericho's uncut version got an 18+ rating for the PC, PlayStation 3 and Xbox 360 versions. In 2010, UGO included the game as the #6 in the article "The 11 Weirdest Game Endings".

== Cancelled sequel ==
Rumours about a sequel to Jericho were confirmed in 2007 when Clive Barker had announced his intention to make a sequel to the game. The sequel project never came to fruition.
