= George Pavlou =

British film director and producer

- Occupations: Film director; producer
- Known for: Underworld; Rawhead Rex

George Pavlou is a British film director and producer, best known for directing the horror films Underworld (1985) and Rawhead Rex (1986). Both films were written by British horror author Clive Barker and preceded Barker's own feature directorial debut, Hellraiser (1987).

Pavlou later directed the Canadian comedy horror film Little Devils: The Birth (1993).

== Career ==
=== Early work ===
Pavlou began his career making short films. His early directing credits included Bad Company and The Antagonist, the latter starring Ed Bishop and Trevor Peacock. He also worked as a producer on short films before moving into feature filmmaking.

=== Collaboration with Clive Barker ===
Pavlou's first feature as director was the 1985 science-fiction horror film Underworld, subsequently released in the United States under the title Transmutations. The film starred Larry Lamb, Denholm Elliott, Steven Berkoff, Nicola Cowper and Ingrid Pitt.

Underworld marked one of Clive Barker's earliest feature-film screenwriting projects. According to Barker, the project originated with Pavlou, who asked him to collaborate on a screenplay. Barker developed a story combining elements of horror, film noir and science fiction, centred on a subterranean society living beneath London.

The completed screenplay was credited to Barker and James Caplin. The film was released as Underworld in the United Kingdom and retitled Transmutations for its American release.

Pavlou and Barker collaborated again on Rawhead Rex, based on Barker's short story of the same name from the third volume of Books of Blood. Barker adapted his story for the screen, and Pavlou directed.

Released in 1986, Rawhead Rex stars David Dukes as an American historian whose research in rural Ireland coincides with the release of an ancient pagan monster. The cast also includes Kelly Piper, Niall Tóibín, Hugh O'Conor and Donal McCann.

The production became notable in the history of Barker's screen work because of his dissatisfaction with the finished film, particularly the physical conception of the title creature. Barker subsequently sought greater creative control over adaptations of his work and made his feature directorial debut with Hellraiser the following year.

Pavlou has subsequently defended aspects of the production and the practical challenges involved in creating the creature. In a 2017 retrospective interview coinciding with the film's restored home-video release, he discussed the production of Rawhead Rex, his collaboration with Barker and the limitations under which the film was made.

=== Later work ===
In 1993, Pavlou directed and produced Little Devils: The Birth, a Canadian comedy horror film starring Russ Tamblyn, Marc Price and Stella Stevens. The film concerns a group of miniature gargoyle-like creatures brought to life by a scientist.

Pavlou subsequently worked in television, commercial production and documentary filmmaking.

== Filmography ==
=== Director ===
Year	Title	Type	Notes
1980	Bad Company	Short film	
1981	The Antagonist	Short film	Starring Ed Bishop and Trevor Peacock
1985	Underworld	Feature film	Released as Transmutations in the United States; screenplay by Clive Barker and James Caplin
1986	Rawhead Rex	Feature film	Screenplay by Barker, based on his short story
1993	Little Devils: The Birth	Feature film	Also producer
