= Tortured Souls =

Series of action figures

- Type: Action Figures
- Invented by: Clive Barker
- Company: McFarlane Toys
- Country: United States
- Availability: 2001–2002

Tortured Souls, also known as Clive Barker's Tortured Souls, is a series of six action figures and a novelette starring the characters of the series. Distributed by McFarlane Toys in July 2001, the series included six monsters designed by horror author Clive Barker.

== Background ==
The toy line was officially announced at the International Toy Fair in New York in February 2001. Barker said the following about creating his first toy line:

People want to see the monsters. We supply the monsters...These are the first toys I've had on the market. I've had model kits and whatnot, but this is a very different order of creation. These are technically amazing and the sheer level of detail is extraordinary. These figures represent the creature that both obsesses you and repulses you simultaneously. These are figures you put in a dark place in your house, probably with some votive candles, to haunt a corner in your home. We've really had fun pushing the envelope.

Each of the figures included a chapter of the 32-page novelette, written by Barker.

== Tortured Souls 2 ==
Due to the success of the idea, a second series titled Tortured Souls 2: The Fallen was released the following year. The appearance of the new figures was more visceral than the first toy line, with less reliance on the bondage-like clothing styles of the first series and more reliance on surgical alteration and mutilation. Additionally, characters of Tortured Souls 2: The Fallen neither appeared in the original novella nor came with any additional story writing.

== Characters ==
=== Tortured Souls ===
- Agonistes - a demon created by God on the seventh day of creation after Adam and Eve. Agonistes is an artist who uses flesh as his canvas to transform Supplicants into monstrous beings. He frequently occupies "burning places" such as deserts or desolate cities where citizens may pray to him. From what little was revealed of Agonistes' background, he once performed his artistry on Judas Iscariot after his betrayal of Christ. However, the tortured man begged and cried so that Agonistes hung him from a tree. This was the only time the demon showed mercy to a Supplicant.
- Lucidique - the daughter of a senator of the city of Primordium who had openly criticized the city's degenerate ruling class and was promptly assassinated by Zarles Kreiger. After luring Kreiger to the desert to be converted by Agonistes, Lucidique was kidnapped and murdered by mob boss Duraf Cascarellian. Resurrected and transformed by Agonistes, Lucidique killed Cascarellian and his sons and soon became lover to the Scythe-Meister. Sometime later, she and Kreiger were confronted by Talisac's Venal Anatomica. The creature killed Kreiger but Lucidique managed to blind him.
- Mongroid - the "son" (having been created through science) of Dr. Talisac. Mongroid grew in Talisac's "womb" for seventeen weeks. Once born, it looked somewhat like Talisac, except being crablike and being forced to walk on four hands. A creature of pure instinct, it killed and devoured Talisac. It then went to the sewers to live.
- The Scythe-Meister - an assassin working under Don Cascarellian with an affinity for scythes, Zarles Kreiger grew up the son of a prostitute on the streets of Primordium. He was ordered to kill a troublesome Senator and was caught in the act by the man's daughter, Lucidique, who led him to Agonistes. Remade as the Scythe-Meister, Zarles slaughtered Primordium's emperor, Perfetto XI, and later became lovers with a similarly transformed Lucidique. Zarles would ultimately meet his violent fate at the hands of Venal Anatomica while defending Lucidique from the creature's rampage.
- Talisac - he is hanging from his face by six hooks, his upper left arm has flesh peeled back, but his most notable feature is the translucent womb where his genitals should be. Inside the womb is the Mongroid. Talisac believes that the birth of Mongroid is the second "virgin birth". After Mongroid's birth however, Talisac was devoured by his child.
- Venal Anatomica - a Frankenstein-esque creature assembled and given life by Doctor Talisac on commission from Primordium's three Generals - Montefalco, Urbano and Bogoto - in hopes of creating a super soldier to defeat the Scythe-Meister following the latter's assassination of Emperor Perfetto XI.

=== Tortured Souls 2 ===
- Szaltax - a six-limbed creature featuring grasping mechanical prosthetics.
- Zain - a being strapped onto a pole who has several mechanical appendages.
- Suffering Bob - a mutation involving the combination of several humans into one grotesque creature.
- Feverish - a grotesquely large creature on a slab giving birth to worms.
- Moribundi - a crucified figure in the process of being torn apart.
- Camille Noire - an angel-inspired creature with flayed flesh "wings" and a "halo" made from a circular saw imbedded in her skull.

== Tie-in novelette ==
Tortured Souls is a novelette written by Clive Barker and included with the toyline. Each chapter was included separately with the series 1 figures.

The story was broken into six parts, each corresponding to the figure with which it was packaged. The order is as follows:

- Book 1 - Agonistes: The Secret Face of Genesis
- Book 2 - Scythe Meister: The Assassin Transformed
- Book 3 - Lucidique: The Avenger
- Book 4 - Talisac: The Surgeon of the Sacred Heart
- Book 5 - Venal Anatomica: The Hunter of Primordium
- Book 6 - Mongroid: The Second Coming

== Tortured Souls: The Legend of Primordium ==
Tortured Souls: The Legend of Primordium is a single volume of the six separate pieces of the Tortured Souls novellas originally available with the toys. It was published by Subterranean Press in February 2015.

== Film adaptation ==
A film adaptation, Tortured Souls: Animae Damnatae, was announced as in development at Universal Pictures in 2001, but had been more-or-less abandoned by 2006.
