= The Painter, The Creature and The Father of Lies =

2011 book by Clive Barker

- First edition
- Editor: Phil Stokes, Sarah Stokes
- Author: Clive Barker
- Language: English
- Genre: Non-fiction
- Publisher: Earthling Publications
- Publication date: 2011

The Painter, The Creature and The Father of Lies is a collection of Clive Barker's non-fiction work, published in 2011. It includes reviews, essays and introductions written by Barker with new artwork and some previously unpublished material.

The volume is edited by Phil and Sarah Stokes, who run Barker's official website, and is published under the imprint of Earthling Publications in three separate states.
