= Rawhead Rex (film) =

- Theatrical release poster.
- Directed by: George Pavlou
- Screenplay by: Clive Barker
- Based on: "Rawhead Rex" by Clive Barker
- Produced by: Kevin Attew; Don Hawkins
- Starring: David Dukes; Kelly Piper; Niall Tóibín; Cora Venus Lunny; Ronan Wilmot; Donal McCann
- Cinematography: John Metcalfe
- Edited by: Andy Horvitch
- Music by: Colin Towns
- Production company: Alpine Pictures; Green Man Productions; Paradise Group
- Distributed by: Vestron Video
- Release date: 14 March 1986 (UK)
- Running time: 89 minutes
- Country: United Kingdom
- Language: English

Rawhead Rex is a 1986 British fantasy horror film directed by George Pavlou from a screenplay by Clive Barker, based on his short story of the same name. The story had originally appeared in Vol. 3 of his Books of Blood series. It stars David Dukes, Kelly Piper, Niall Tóibín, Cora Venus Lunny and Donal McCann.

The film focuses on a monstrous pagan deity's bloody rampage through the Irish countryside, with the title alluding to the folklore monster Rawhead. Pavlou and Barker had previously worked together on Transmutations (also known as Underworld).

The film was given a limited release in the United States by Empire Pictures on 17 April 1987.

== Plot ==
Howard Hallenbeck travels to rural Ireland with his family to research items of religious significance. He and his family go to a rural church to photograph gravestones and the stained glass windows. Outside of town, a farmer is attempting to remove a large obelisk from his field. He jars the obelisk loose slightly and a storm begins. Lightning strikes the obelisk, toppling it and releasing the monster, Rawhead Rex, from its tomb.

Howard meets Declan O'Brien, the Church verger, who directs him to Reverend Coot. Later, the curious O'Brien approaches the altar and places his hand on it. Images flash before his eyes. This experience destroys O'Brien's sanity. Howard inquiries about the church's parish records. Coot says he can arrange to have Howard look at them but finds they have been stolen. O'Brien destroys his camera.

A man arrives at the home of locals Dennis and Jenny. He discovers a traumatized Jenny. Police arrive. Rawhead drags Dennis's dead body through the forest and comes upon a Traveler site. There he kills a teenager named Andy Johnson.

On the road again, Howard pulls over to let his daughter urinate by a tree. Hearing her scream, Howard and his wife rush to her; Howard's son stays in the van, alone. Rawhead kills Howard's son and takes the body into the woods. Infuriated by the police's unsuccessful efforts to track down Rawhead, Howard returns to the church. He discovers that there is a weapon shown in the stained glass window that can be used to defeat the monster. After Howard leaves, Coot curiously touches the altar but resists the temptations and images it shows him.

Rawhead arrives at the church to "baptize" O'Brien by urinating on him. A bewildered Coot goes outside to investigate the noise and sees Rawhead. Horrified, Coot flees inside the church and into the basement while Rawhead destroys everything inside. Coot finds the missing parish records, showing what appears to be some kind of blueprint of Rawhead. O'Brien catches Coot and forces him upstairs to be sacrificed to Rawhead. The police arrive at the church but hesitate to open fire on Rawhead because he is carrying Coot. The brainwashed inspector dumps gasoline around the police cars and ignites it as they begin to shoot at Rawhead, killing all the police, including himself.

Howard leaves his wife and daughter and goes back to the church, where a dying Coot tells him that Rawhead is afraid of something in the altar. Howard goes inside. O'Brien is burning books and is overpowered by Howard. Howard, by using a candle stick, opens the altar and gets to the weapon. O'Brien retreats to Rawhead to tell him. Howard tries to use the weapon, but it has no effect. In anger, Rawhead kills O'Brien by tearing out his throat.

As Rawhead tries to kill Howard, Howard's wife picks up the weapon. A ray of light comes out of the weapon and hits Rawhead, stopping Rawhead from killing Howard. Howard realizes that the weapon works only when wielded by a woman. The form of a woman appears from the stone and shoots electric rays through the stones and into Rawhead's body, knocking him to the ground. After more blasts, Rawhead is drained, allowing Howard to hit him with a shovel. Rawhead then falls through the ground and Howard's wife drops the weapon in with him. Rawhead is smashed under giant stones. Both Howard and his wife weep in light of it being over.

The boy from the trailer park places flowers on Andy Johnson's grave. As he walks away, Rawhead emerges from the ground and roars.

== Cast ==
- David Dukes as Howard Hallenbeck
- Kelly Piper as Elaine Hallenbeck
- Ronan Wilmott as Declan O'Brien
- Niall Toibin as Reverend Coot
- Niall O'Brien as Detective Inspector Isaac Gissing
- Hugh O'Conor as Robbie Hallenbeck
- Cora Venus Lunny as Minty Hallenbeck
- Donal McCann as Tom Garron
- Eleanor Feely as Jenny Nicholson
- Gladys Sheehan as Ena Benedict
- Madelyn Erskine as Alice Gibson
- Gerry Walsh as Dennis McHugh
- Noel O'Donovan as Mitch Harney
- John Olohan as Dennis Nicholson
- Peter Donovan as Liam Blanchfield
- Bob Carlile as Garda Conroy
- Patrick Dawson as Detective Inspector Larkin
- Finbar Lynch as Andy Johnson
- Maeve Germaine as Katrina Gill
- Simon Kelly as Neil Johnson
- Derry Power as Sean Power
- Sheila Flitton as Nancy Power
- Heinrich von Schellendorf as Rawhead Rex

== Production ==
Although Barker's short story was set in Kent, filming took place entirely in County Wicklow, Ireland; in Leinster, Redcross, and Laragh. The production initially planned to shoot at Bray Film Studios in England, but production moved to the Republic of Ireland to cut costs. The titular monster was designed by Peter Litten's company Coast to Coast which previously provided the effects for Director George Pavlou and Clive Barker's previous film Underworld. Producer for Green Man Productions, Kevin Attew, described the film as "Jaws on land" and called the film an update on 50s B movies.

The role of Rawhead Rex was first offered to Peter Mayhew, but his fee was too high. The costume was designed and created by Peter Litten.

== Release ==
The film was given a limited release theatrically in the United States by Empire Pictures in 1987. It was later released on VHS by Vestron Video that same year.

The film was released on DVD in the US by Geneon on 5 October 1999. It was re-released by Prism on 29 July 2003. A 4K restoration of Rawhead Rex, based on the original camera negative, was released on Blu-ray and DVD by Kino Lorber on 17 October 2017.

== Reception ==
Rawhead Rex has a 30% approval rating on Rotten Tomatoes and an average rating of 4.4/10 based on 10 critics. Cinefantastique gave the film a negative review, criticizing the design of the title monster as being more laughable than frightening, and the film's dull finale.

Barker has said that while he feels the movie is essentially faithful to his story, he is dissatisfied with it. In an interview less than a year after the film's release, he explained: "I think, generally speaking, the movie followed the beats of the screenplay. It's just that monster movies, by and large, are made by directorial 'oomph' rather than what's in the screenplay. I'd like to think the screenplay for Rawhead Rex had the possibility of having major thrills in it. I don't think it was quite pulled off". In a 2004 interview, Barker said he wanted to do a remake of the film, but nothing further came of this.
