= The Damnation Game (novel) =

Novel by Clive Barker

- First edition cover
- Author: Clive Barker
- Genre: Horror
- Publisher: Weidenfeld & Nicolson
- Publication date: 1985

The Damnation Game is a 1985 horror novel by English writer Clive Barker. It is Barker's first novel.

== Synopsis ==
Marty Strauss is a gambling addict recently released from prison. He is hired as the personal bodyguard of Joseph Whitehead, one of the wealthiest men in the world. The job is more complicated and dangerous than he thought. He gets caught up in a series of supernatural events involving Whitehead, and the mysterious Mamoulian, through whom Whitehead made a deal with the Devil during World War II. Mamoulian uses his supernatural powers (like raising the dead) to urge Whitehead to fulfill this pact. Whitehead decides to escape after several encounters with Mamoulian and after his wife, his former bodyguard, and his daughter, Carys are taken away from him. Marty Strauss comes to believe that Whitehead deserves his punishment, and decides to save Carys, who is a heroin addict, from being another victim of her father's game.

== Reception ==
=== Reviews ===
Reviews for The Damnation Game were mixed: Algis Budrys praised it as "a masterly novel." Neil Gaiman reviewed it for Imagine magazine, calling it: "Quite simply the most literate and disturbing horror novel I have ever read." However, Kirkus Reviews was less fulsome, saying: "...lacking the formal control dictated by the story form, here Barker appears as a naughty boy hidden in a giant candy store, stuffing himself on nasty, offensive sweets. This study in excess may win Barker new readers, but not a better reputation."

=== Awards and nominations ===
The book was nominated for the 1986 World Fantasy Awards (novel), the 1986 Locus Awards (fantasy novel), as well as for the 1988 Bram Stoker Awards (first novel).

== Film adaptation ==
On 13 May 2001, Barker planned to produce a film adaption of the novel with John Heffernan writing the screenplay for Warner Bros. and Phoenix Pictures.
