= The Thief of Always =

Novel by Clive Barker

- First edition
- Author: Clive Barker
- Illustrator: Clive Barker
- Cover artist: Clive Barker
- Language: English
- Genre: Dark fantasy Suspense
- Publisher: HarperCollins
- Publication date: 1 November 1992
- Publication place: United Kingdom
- Media type: Print (hardback)
- Pages: 225 (first edition)
- ISBN: 0-06-017724-1
- OCLC: 26356764

The Thief of Always is a 1992 novel written and illustrated by Clive Barker. The plot concerns a 10-year-old boy who journeys to a magical house, only to discover its master uses the home to attract children and steal their youth to ensure his own immortality.

== Plot ==
10-year-old Harvey Swick is approached by a stranger named Rictus, who offers him the opportunity to stay at the magical Holiday House, founded by one Mr. Hood. Harvey accepts and accompanies Rictus there, meeting two other children, Wendell and Lulu, as well as its elderly caretaker, Mrs. Griffin, and her three cats.

At the Holiday House, all of the seasons pass by in a day, with Halloween and Thanksgiving in the evening and Christmas at night. However, Mr. Hood himself is nowhere to be found, there are mentions of a mysterious figure named Carna, the nearby lake is full of enormous, sad looking fish, and Mrs. Griffin seems to be keeping a dark secret about the house. Harvey must use his wits and clever thinking in order to escape and return home.

== Reception ==
=== Reviews ===
Publishers Weekly described the book as "both cute and horrifying", noting its similarity to Grimm's Fairy Tales. Kirkus Reviews described Barker's "studiously simple narration" as lacking in spirit.

=== Awards and nominations ===
The novel was nominated for the 1993 Locus Award for Best Horror/Dark Fantasy Novel. It won the 1995 Grand Prix de l'Imaginaire for best youth novel, and was nominated for the 1996 Kurd Laßwitz Award for best foreign novel.

== Adaptations ==
The Thief of Always was adapted as a bimonthly three-part comic book, published between January and May 2005, by IDW Publishing.

In the mid-1990s, The Thief of Always was set to be adapted for Paramount Pictures as a $22.5 million animated musical film with music by Jerry Goldsmith and Clive Barker set to produce. Nelvana was set to produce the animation for the film, and Kathleen Kennedy and Frank Marshall serving as co-executive producers. The film reportedly made it through two thirds of the storyboarding process.
