= Fear of a Black Republican =

- Fear of a Black Republican official movie poster
- Directed by: Kevin J Williams
- Produced by: Kevin J Williams; Tamara E Williams
- Cinematography: Jeffrey Metzner; Kevin J Williams
- Edited by: Kevin J Williams; Robert Fowler
- Distributed by: Passion River Films; Shamrock Stine Productions LLC
- Release date: June 23, 2011
- Running time: 111 minutes
- Country: United States
- Language: English

Fear of a Black Republican is an American independent political documentary which examines the lack of minorities and especially African Americans in the Republican Party in the United States.

The film had its theatrical premiere in Washington, DC on March 22, 2012, and has screened around the United States at theatres, film festivals, colleges, universities, and museums.

== Concept ==
Produced over six years by the married filmmaking team of Kevin and Tamara Williams, the film takes a non-partisan point-of-view of the American two-party political system and why the Republican Party has so few black and urban supporters.

Many of the film's scenes take place in the Northeast and Southern U.S. and primarily cover the time period of 2004–2009. Former U.S. Presidents Barack Obama and George W. Bush figure prominently, but are not the focus of the film. Many political and media figures are interviewed throughout, including Mitt Romney, Cornel West, Mike Huckabee, Michael Steele, Tavis Smiley, John McCain, Ann Coulter, Newt Gingrich, Grover Norquist, Senator Edward W. Brooke, Christine Todd Whitman, Michelle Malkin, Jim Gilmore, Lynn Swann and Tom Delay. The film also features interviews with many non-celebrities and regular citizens/voters who are Democratic, Republican and Independent.

While the filmmakers identify themselves as Republicans, the film's non-partisan claim is supported by independent reviews from film critics Kam Williams, a syndicated columnist, and Sean Edwards as well as many other reviewers across the country. The film also follows a black Republican female candidate in Atlanta, Georgia named Catherine Davis during her congressional election run. The film includes a historical timeline explaining much of the history of the Republican Party and includes the founding of the GOP in 1854 until the “Party of Lincoln” lost the black vote in the 1960s. It also covers the Ku Klux Klan's co-option by the Democratic Party during Reconstruction through the 1960s and the Kennedy-Nixon-Goldwater-Johnson era. Archival footage, some rarely seen, is included in the film and comes from sources such as the National Archives and ABC News.
