= Project Skyquake =

2022 found footage science fiction film by József Gallai

- Directed by: József Gallai
- Written by: József Gallai
- Produced by: Jon Vangdal Aamaas; Pete Baez; Beáta Boldog; Gergő Elekes; József Gallai; Stephen Sid Jardine; Tommy Lentsch
- Starring: Laura Ellen Wilson; Laura Saxon; Tom Sizemore; Robert LaSardo; Simon Bamford
- Cinematography: Gergő Elekes; József Gallai
- Edited by: Gergő Elekes
- Music by: Gergő Elekes
- Production companies: Elekes Pictures; Da Yamms Entertainment; Nguyen Bros. Production
- Distributed by: BayView Entertainment
- Release date: 2022
- Running time: 72 minutes
- Country: Hungary
- Language: English

Project Skyquake (Hungarian: Égbolt) is a 2022 found footage science fiction film directed by József Gallai. It stars Laura Ellen Wilson as a student journalist who investigates unexplained trumpet-like sounds heard in the sky, a real reported phenomenon known as skyquakes, with Laura Saxon, and features Tom Sizemore, Robert LaSardo and Simon Bamford.

Project Skyquake was shot in Hungary and on location in Norway, around the Hardangerfjord. BayView Entertainment released it in 2022. The film received generally positive reviews, with praise for its atmosphere and visual effects and criticism of its unresolved plotting.

== Plot ==
Andrew Derrickson (Simon Bamford) addresses the camera to describe the disappearance of his stepdaughter, the student journalist Cassie (Laura Ellen Wilson), and her friend Margot (Laura Saxon), who vanished near a small village a month earlier. He speaks over images of empty roads, abandoned buildings and forests, and explains that the world has since changed and that billions of people no longer live on the planet.

The film then presents footage of the days before the disappearance. Cassie, newly employed as a news editor and reporter at a university in Hungary, is fascinated by "skyquakes", a documented phenomenon in which people report hearing explosions or trumpet-like sounds coming from the sky. She persuades Margot to travel with her to a location in Hungary where the sounds have repeatedly been reported.

After Hank (Tom Sizemore), another researcher of the phenomenon, sends her a video, Cassie learns from the sky watcher Scott Carmichael (Robert LaSardo) that the events have spread worldwide. The pair drive further into an apparently deserted forest, where they experience a skyquake directly and discover more than they had expected.

== Cast ==
- Laura Ellen Wilson as Cassie
- Laura Saxon as Margot
- Tom Sizemore as Hank
- Robert LaSardo as Scott
- Simon Bamford as Andrew
- Jon Vangdal Aamaas as Professor Stokkebø
- Shawn Michael Clankie as Paul (voice)

Gergő Elekes, József Gallai, Péter Krenács, Pál Marton, Laura Saxon and Bálint Szántó appear as the monks and skygazers.

== Production ==
Project Skyquake was written and directed by József Gallai, a filmmaker based in Veszprém. He told (re)Search my Trash that he was influenced by character-driven science fiction and mystery films carried by small casts, citing Monsters, The Endless, The Vast of Night and The Fare. Speaking to PopHorror, Gallai said the skyquake phenomenon had given him "strong material" to write from, and described his approach as telling stories that can realistically be filmed. Although he wrote the script, much of the dialogue was improvised by the two lead actors.

Gallai cast Laura Ellen Wilson and Laura Saxon, with whom he had worked on The Poltergeist Diaries and I Hear the Trees Whispering, for the chemistry between them, and traced his interest in casting Simon Bamford to renting Hellraiser on VHS as a child.

The Hungarian news site Promotions.hu reported that the film was shot in nine days in March 2022, and that only the two female leads were able to travel to Hungary for the shoot there; Gallai told the outlet that two small crews abroad recorded Sizemore's and LaSardo's scenes, while a third crew filmed in Norway with Aamaas. The guest performers were filmed remotely. PopHorror noted that the Hungarian shoot took place at almost the same time as the Russian invasion of Ukraine, with the fighting roughly a thousand kilometres from the filming locations.

Bergens Tidende reported from the Norwegian shoot in April 2022. The newspaper described the filming of Aamaas's scenes as Professor Per Stokkebø around the Hardangerfjord, with the Folgefonna glacier visible in the background, and in a boathouse belonging to the Aamaas family at Kvam, photographed by Andreas Huseby Grønner and Farshid Amini. Aamaas, a general practitioner in Os who acts in his spare time, paid the two photographers himself and in doing so became a co-producer of the film. Gallai told the newspaper that he had noticed early in their collaboration how dedicated Aamaas was as a performer, and that filming him in Norwegian landscapes would be a strong element of the film; the two had worked together since 2020, and Project Skyquake was the third of Gallai's films to feature him.

Gergő Elekes served as cinematographer alongside Gallai, and also edited the film and composed its music and sound design; Fershid Emini and Andreas H Grønner are credited with co-cinematography and as lighting technicians, and Grønner additionally as sound recordist. Neil Rowe created the visual effects, Pete Baez operated camera, and János Élő handled props. Still photography was by Pál Marton and Bálint Szántó. Colm Geoghegan designed the poster, Sándor Gál cut the trailer, and Áron Jakab was graphic designer. Shawn Michael Clankie, who voices Paul, also worked as script consultant, and Jennifer Rutherford was location scout. The closing credits present the film as a production of Elekes Pictures, Da Yamms Entertainment and Nguyen Bros. Production.

The film features the songs "Shadowbridge", written and performed by Dane E. Connor, and "Just Kiss Me", written by Chris Shadel and Eric Ziegmont and performed by Eric Ziegmont's State of Shock.

== Release ==
BayView Entertainment released Project Skyquake in 2022, listing it as drama, mystery and science fiction. The film runs approximately 72 minutes.

== Reception ==
Alan Ng of Film Threat rated the film 7 out of 10, calling it "a mystery box film that weaves together sci-fi and religious tones" and noting that it is "self-aware enough to call out" The Blair Witch Project, "which, let's be honest, is exactly what inspired it". He wrote that "the low-budget approach actually works in the film's favor" and that "for a small-budget film, the special effects are quite impressive", singling out the sky sequences and their sound design and lighting, and said the skyquakes were "just the backdrop for a more emotional story" carried by Wilson and Saxon.

Lisa Marie Bowman of Through the Shattered Lens called it "an enjoyably creepy found footage film" and wrote that it "makes good use of its atmospheric locations, with the forest and the things found within growing significantly more threatening with each passing moment". She concluded that it was "a short but effective film about a real-world phenomena" that "will make you listen to the sky a little more carefully the next time you're standing underneath it".

(re)Search my Trash contrasted the film with the genre at large, writing that "too many found footage films nowadays consist of the actors clumsily try to improvise dialogue while using shaky camerawork to fake excitement and suspense", whereas Project Skyquake "has much more thought put into it, starting with the fact that the two protagonists just feel real". The review also noted that the guest stars, though filmed remotely, were "cleverly" integrated.

Jim Morazzini of Voices from the Balcony wrote that the film "kept me amused and occasionally weirded out", calling Rowe's effects "quite good for a low-budget film" and Elekes's score "sparse but effective". He also found the film "a bit on the talky side" before the characters reach their destination, wrote that some viewers would find the last act "a bit too strange" and that it "leaves a lot of questions unanswered at the final fade-out", and concluded that "the final act could have done with a bit tighter plotting and the sound levels seemed inconsistent at times".

Chris Ringler of The Spooky World of Chris Ringler was more mixed. He called the film "ably acted and shot well" and praised its use of faux-documentary technique, but criticised its unresolved plotting, writing that it "just can't seem to figure out what exactly is happening or won't tell us" and that the film was "decent enough, but there are too many questions with no answers". He concluded that "there is a really compelling and scary movie here that just isn't given a chance".

Writing for PopHorror, Tracy Allen called the film's visuals "stunning" and wrote that it "gives off a Blair Witch Project vibe, and in the best way possible", also praising its dialogue-driven approach. She said there was "very little in Project Skyquake that didn't resonate with me", while raising what she called minor criticisms: the absence of blood on recently killed cult members, and the inconsistency in which characters were affected by the skyquakes.
