= The Disrupted =

2020 American documentary film

- Film poster
- Directed by: Sarah Colt; Josh Gleason (co-director)
- Produced by: Sarah Colt; Josh Gleason; Emily Schuman (co-producer)
- Cinematography: Tom Bergmann
- Edited by: Lynn True
- Music by: Troy Herion
- Production company: Sarah Colt Productions
- Distributed by: Passion River Films; 8 Above
- Release date: May 2020
- Running time: 90 minutes
- Country: United States
- Language: English

The Disrupted is a 2020 American documentary film, directed by Sarah Colt and Josh Gleason. Colt also served as one of the film's producers. The movie focuses on America's middle class, which the directors state is becoming increasingly impoverished and is struggling to make ends meet.

== Synopsis ==
In the documentary Colt and Gleason focus on America's increasingly impoverished middle class and the struggles to make ends meet between the challenges of the 2008 Great Recession, the reduction of steady job possibilities, and rising income inequality. The film follows three individuals, a Kansas farmer, a laid-off factory worker in Ohio, and an Uber driver in Florida.

The title of the film refers to the disruptive innovation in technologies brought in by service companies, such as Uber, Airbnb and Amazon that, while affording new opportunities for customers and lifestyle, also created new, more precarious jobs while eliminating other jobs altogether.

== Release ==
The Disrupted had its world premiere during May 2020 at Mountainfilm, which was held virtually due to the COVID-19 pandemic in the United States. The documentary went on to screen at multiple film festivals that included DOK. Fest München, Woods Hole Film Festival, Buffalo International Film Festival, and the Milwaukee Film Festival.

Film distribution rights were acquired by Passion River Films and 8 Above in September 2020 and the documentary received a limited release in virtual cinemas, along with a video on demand on October 13, 2020, in the United States.

== Reception ==
Common praise for The Disrupted centered upon its topics. Critics such as Josh McCormack of Mountain Xpress and Christy Lemire of Southern California Public Radio's KPCC FilmWeek felt that this was vital due to 2020 being an election year and for people who were "being left behind in our current economy…theoretically the “forgotten men and women” Trump campaigned on. And in the ensuing years, not only have their lives not gotten better, they've gotten significantly worse.". Other elements of praise included the direction of Colt and Gleason, as well as the cinematography which Peter Keough of The Boston Globe described as "evoking a mood of fading hope and dogged resistance.”
