= Sunshine Girl (disambiguation) =

Sunshine Girl or Sunshine Girls may refer to:

- Sunshine Girl, the pinup section in the Sun chain of newspapers in Canada
- "Sunshine Girl" (Herman's Hermits song), a 1968 song by the Herman's Hermits
- "Sunshine Girl" (Moumoon song), a 2010 song by the Japanese band Moumoon
- The Sunshine Girl, a 1912 West End musical comedy
- Günther (singer), who performed as Günther and the Sunshine Girls
- Jamaica national netball team, nicknamed the Sunshine Girls
- Tiller Girls, a dance troupe of the early 1900s
- Pythian Sunshine Girls, an auxiliary of the Knights of Pythias for young women
- The main character of The Haunting of Sunshine Girl
