= Black-eyed children =

Urban legend

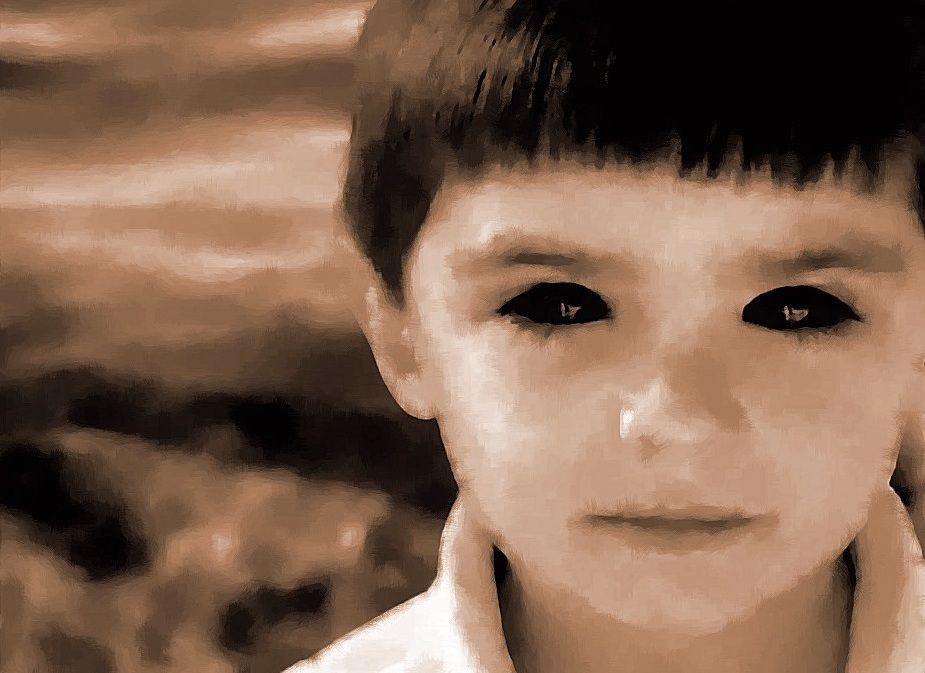
An artist's impression of a black-eyed child

Black-eyed children (or black-eyed kids) are legendary paranormal creatures originating in modern American folklore, which superficially resemble human children or teenagers between the ages of 6 to 16 with pale skin and pitch-black eyes. They are reportedly seen begging or hitchhiking, or are encountered on doorsteps of residential homes. These beings are alleged to be either undead, ghostly, demonic, alien, or otherwise inhuman creatures attempting to impersonate ordinary human children, in order to manipulate people by requesting entry into houses or riding in vehicles, with supposedly sinister motives.

== History ==
While tabloid coverage of these creatures has claimed that tales of black-eyed children have existed since the 1980s, most sources indicate that the legend originated from 1996 postings written by Texas reporter Brian Bethel on a "ghost-related mailing list," relating two alleged encounters with "black-eyed kids." Bethel describes encountering two such children in Abilene, Texas, in 1996, and claims that a second person had a similar, unrelated encounter in Portland, Oregon. Bethel's stories have become regarded as classic examples of creepypasta; his stories gained such popularity that he published a FAQ "just to keep up with demand for more info about the new urban legend." In 2012, Brian Bethel told his story on reality TV series Monsters and Mysteries in America. He wrote a follow-up article for the Abilene Reporter News, describing his experience and maintaining his belief that it was legitimate.

In 2012, the horror film Black Eyed Kids was produced with Kickstarter funding, its director commenting that the creepy children were "an urban legend that's been floating around on the Internet for years now; I always thought it was fascinating." A 2013 episode of MSN's Weekly Strange that featured reports of black-eyed children is thought to have helped spread the legend on the internet. In 2025, the found footage horror film The Black-Eyed Children, written and directed by József Gallai, adapted the legend.

During one week in September 2014, the tabloid Daily Star ran three sensationalistic front-page stories about alleged sightings of black-eyed children, connected to the sale of a supposedly haunted pub in Staffordshire. The paper claimed a "shock rise in sightings around the world". Alleged sightings are taken seriously by ghost hunters, some of whom believe black-eyed children to be extraterrestrials, vampires, or ghosts.

Science writer Sharon A. Hill was unable to find any documentation of black-eyed child encounters, concluding that the tales are passed on as "friend of a friend" ghost stories. Hill considers the legend to resemble "typical spooky folklore stories" such as the phantom black dog, where the subject is not supernatural, and there may never have been an actual original encounter. Snopes rates tales of black-eyed children as a legend, and cites an Inquisitr article that advised readers to "[f]ile black eyed children under the same heading as 'bigfoot'. Believe it if you like, but realize that there is no evidence of their existence, just subjective testimony that ranges from reasonable to suspiciously fame-whoring".

== See also ==
- Horror films about child villains
- List of urban legends
- Men in black – Government agents who supposedly intimidate UFO witnesses
- Vanishing hitchhiker – Urban legend
