= Trinity (2016 film) =

- Directed by: Skip Shea
- Written by: Skip Shea
- Starring: Sean Carmichael; David Graziano
- Music by: Steven Lanning-Cafaro
- Distributed by: BayView Entertainment
- Release date: 2016
- Running time: 84 minutes
- Country: United States
- Language: English

Trinity is a 2016 American psychological thriller film written and directed by Skip Shea in his feature directorial debut. Partly inspired by Shea's own experiences with clergy abuse, the film stars Sean Carmichael as Michael, an artist who becomes tortured by his past after a chance encounter with a priest who abused him as a child.

== Cast ==
- Sean Carmichael as Michael
- David Graziano as Father Tom

== Production ==
Trinity was inspired in part by writer-director Skip Shea's own experiences with clergy abuse. The film marks Shea's feature directorial debut, following his short films Microcinema (2011) and Ave Maria (2013), which dealt with similar themes. Filming for Trinity took place in Worcester, Massachusetts, including at a restaurant called Nick's Bar and Restaurant.

== Release ==
Trinity screened at a number of film festivals, including the Boston Underground Film Festival in March 2017.

The film was made available for streaming on Amazon Prime Video on September 28, 2021.

== Reception ==
Victor D. Infante of Worcester Magazine noted the film's "power and intensity, which Shea orchestrates masterfully", and wrote that, "while its themes can be dark and deeply uncomfortable, it's very much worth watching." John Townsend of Diabolique Magazine gave the film a score of three-and-a-half out of five stars, praising its cinematography and calling it "an impressive, honest work of visual poetry. Judged solely as a piece of cinema, there are issues that a casual viewer may find too difficult to overcome. Not one for the masses."

Tony Wash, in his review of Trinity for Bloody Disgusting, commended the film's "solid performances" and look, and wrote that it "contains elements that are terrifyingly real, sometimes much more disturbing than what I prefer in a horror movie". However, Wash added that he found himself "losing interest midway through."
