= The Future of the Race =

1996 book

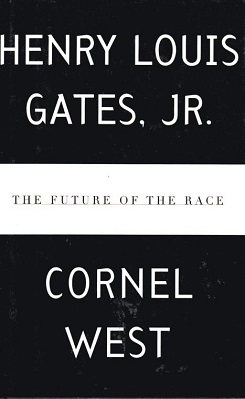
First edition (publ. Knopf)

The Future of the Race is a 1996 book by prominent African-American scholars Henry Louis Gates and Cornel West. It is both commentary and criticism on W. E. B. Du Bois' essay "The Talented Tenth" . The Vintage Books edition includes the original text by Du Bois.

== Bibliography ==
Gates, Henry (1996). The Future of the Race. New York: Vintage Books. ISBN 0-679-76378-3.
