= Race Matters =

1993 book by Cornel West

- Author: Cornel West
- Language: English
- Subject: Race issues
- Genre: Social science
- Publisher: Vintage Books
- Publication date: 1993
- Publication place: United States
- Pages: 159
- ISBN: 0-679-74986-1

Race Matters is a social sciences book by Cornel West. The book was first published on April 1, 1993, by Beacon Press. The book analyzes moral authority and racial debates concerning skin color in the United States. The book questions matters of economics and politics, as well as ethical issues and spirituality, and also addresses the crisis in black American leadership.

== Summary ==
The book consists of an introduction, followed by eight essays, many of which previously appeared in other publications, such as The New York Times Magazine, Dissent and Z Magazine. In order, these essays are:

1. "Nihilism in Black America"
2. "The Pitfalls of Racial Reasoning"
3. "The Crisis of Black Leadership"
4. "Demystifying the New Black Conservatism"
5. "Beyond Affirmative Action: Equality and Identity"
6. "On Black-Jewish Relations"
7. "Black Sexuality: The Taboo Subject"
8. "Malcolm X and Black Rage"

== Reception ==
Michiko Kakutani praised Race Matters, writing in The New York Times "one can only applaud the ferocious moral vision and astute intellect on display in these pages", though she criticized his proposed solutions to racial problems as 'vague and sentimentally utopian'.

A positive review in The Washington Post stated that "there are parts of this book that are as moving as any of the sermons of the Reverend Martin Luther King Jr., as profound as W.E.B. Du Bois' The Souls of Black Folk, as exhilarating in their offering of liberation as James Baldwin's early essays".

Race Matters received a positive review in Publishers Weekly, which called the book 'powerful' and said that the essays 'solidify [West's] position as one of the nation's leading public intellectuals'

The book was positively received by Kirkus Reviews, which praised West's 'clear thinking and sensible analysis' though stated that, in aiming for a broad audience 'West perhaps too much curtails his customary intellectual range'.
