= Aftermath (2024 Hungarian film) =

2024 science fiction film by József Gallai and Gergő Elekes

- Release poster
- Directed by: Gergő Elekes; József Gallai
- Written by: József Gallai; Derek C. Block
- Produced by: Chuck Harding; Gergő Elekes; József Gallai; Timothy Beal; Tommy Lentsch
- Starring: Fruzsina Nagy; Edward Apeagyei; Sally Kirkland; Eric Roberts; James Duval; Péter Inoka; Simon Bamford
- Cinematography: Gergő Elekes
- Edited by: Gergő Elekes
- Music by: Gergő Elekes
- Production companies: McClurg Productions; Elekes Pictures; Nguyen Bros. Production; Car Trek; Welkin Productions
- Distributed by: BayView Entertainment
- Release date: January 29, 2024
- Running time: 78 minutes
- Countries: Hungary; United States; United Kingdom
- Language: English

Aftermath is a 2024 science fiction film directed by Gergő Elekes and József Gallai, from a screenplay by Gallai and Derek C. Block. A feature-length remake of the directors' 2020 short film of the same name, it stars Fruzsina Nagy as a woman who wakes in a forest with no memory of her past, and features Edward Apeagyei, Sally Kirkland, Eric Roberts and James Duval.

BayView Entertainment released the film on Blu-ray and on digital platforms on 29 January 2024. It won 18 awards across five festivals in 2023, including six at the Festigious International Film Festival and six at the Vegas Movie Awards, with Best Picture at the former and Best Director at the latter, and its ensemble cast winning at both.

== Plot ==
A scientist announces that a long-running neurological research project has reached a significant milestone, while cautioning that further testing is required.

Kate, who has worked on the project for five years, leaves her home in distress and takes a call from her supervisor, Robbie. Reaching for a spilt cup of coffee, she crashes her car.

Kate wakes in a forest with no idea how she arrived and no memory of her past life. She is shot dead by a soldier in a gas mask, only to wake in the forest again and be killed a second time. On the third occasion, she disarms the soldier and kills him, but others arrive to pursue her. She is saved by Bubba, another wanderer who has likewise woken in the forest without memories, and who directs her towards traces of her former life and arms her with a pistol.

Following his advice, Kate recovers fragments of her past, including a phone containing photographs of her daughter. The soldiers are instructed by their leader, who appears to them by video projection, to kill her before her memory returns, on the grounds that her remembering would bring about the end of their world.

Kate and Bubba both carry photographs naming Kate, Peter and Sophie, though neither recognises them. As her memory begins to return, Kate pieces together fragments of her life before the accident while the hunters close in.

== Cast ==
- Fruzsina Nagy as Kate
- Edward Apeagyei as Bubba
- Sally Kirkland as Dr. Jane Dunning
- Eric Roberts as The Mysterious Man
- James Duval as Martin
- Péter Inoka as Peter, Kate's husband
- Simon Bamford as Alpha (voice)
- Karolina Szabó as Sophie (older)
- Zsófia Gallai as Sophie (younger)
- László Némethy as Alpha
- Dániel Vince as Beta
- Zoltán Eőry as Gamma
- Bálint Szántó as Delta / Victim
- Péter József Szabó as Omega
- Shawn Michael Clankie as Beta (voice)
- Tommy Lentsch as Delta / Omega (voice)
- Joseph Richmond as Robbie (voice)
- Laura Saxon as Reporter (voice)
- Laura Ellen Wilson as Doctor (voice)
- Pál Marton as Victim
- Viktor Dávid Koppán as Firefighter
- László Pavelcze as Paramedic
- András Babodi
- Péter Krenács
- Sándor Detki
- István Handler
- László Szabó
- Péter Klupács

== Production ==
Aftermath is a feature-length remake of a 2020 short film of the same name by the same directors. Gergő Elekes served as cinematographer, editor and composer in addition to co-directing, while József Gallai wrote the screenplay with Derek C. Block as co-writer. The pair had previously co-directed the features Moth and Bodom. Gallai, who is known for found-footage films, mysterious storylines and surprise endings, has made his films in English since 2015, aiming them at an international market. He has said that he was drawn to filmmaking after seeing M. Night Shyamalan's Lady in the Water in 2008, and that he has been interested in legends and mysteries since childhood.

The film was produced by Chuck Harding, Gergő Elekes, József Gallai, Timothy Beal and Tommy Lentsch.

Visual effects were created by Neil Rowe, with special makeup effects by Dániel Sasvári-Molnár and hair styling by Nancy Greener. Sound design and audio post-production were supervised by Firoze Patel and Kaizad Patel, with Josh McCarthy as foley artist and Zsolt Kolláth handling dialogue recording and editing.

Pyrotechnic effects were by Péter József Szabó and Dániel Vince, served as weapons master, with Sándor Detki and Krisztina Nagy as stunt drivers. Costumes were by László Némethy and Dániel Vince, who also worked on props alongside Péter József Szabó. Pál Marton served as a drone pilot, Gergely Becker-Bérdi managed locations with Alexa Tringli as a location scout, Viktor Dávid Koppán was a production coordinator, and Ryan O'Grady worked as a dialect coach. Still photography was by András Babodi, Pál Marton, Krisztina Nagy and Alexa Tringli.

The closing credits present the film as a picture by McClurg Productions, Elekes Pictures, Nguyen Bros. Production, Car Trek and Welkin Productions, a co-production between Hungary, the United States and the United Kingdom.

Horror Society described the film as featuring "special appearances by Academy Award nominees Sally Kirkland and Eric Roberts".

The film credits two songs: "Old Sour", written and performed by Dane E. Connor, and "Water Hotter", written by Eric Ziegmont and performed by Eric Ziegmont's State of Shock.

== Release ==
The film played the festival circuit during 2023, ahead of its commercial release the following year. BayView Entertainment released it on Blu-ray and on digital platforms on 29 January 2024. It was released to rent and buy on Amazon Prime Video in the United Kingdom and the United States, and on Region-free Blu-ray in the United States, with an advertising-supported release worldwide from 30 March 2024. The film later became available for free, advertising-supported streaming on Tubi.

== Reception ==
(re)Search my Trash called the film "quite a powerful experience, a maze-like film that really leaves the viewer with only gradually more information as the lead character, so one is kept guessing really until the very end", and praised "a strong cast, very moody outdoors locations, and a directorial effort with an emphasis on tension and atmosphere".

Jim Morazzini of Voices from the Balcony wrote that the film has "more of a science fiction thriller feel to it than [Gallai's] usual supernatural horror plots" and praised Nagy, who appears in almost every scene, for giving "us a lead character we can care about". He considered the plot's central mystery "too easy to figure out", noting that the opening scenes signal the involvement of Dr. Dunning's research.

Writing for Through the Shattered Lens, Lisa Marie Bowman said the film "deals with a very real fear", describing the loss of both identity and control over one's own fate as being "at the heart of many horror stories".

Road Rash Reviews called it "an eerie, closed-in experience, as the mist engulfs the trees, you and your mind, making you hold your breath as we see the struggle to stay alive".

Nerdly criticised an early scene in which the protagonist's circumstances are conveyed through expository dialogue.

Rotten Tomatoes categorises the film as drama, mystery, thriller, and science fiction. Horror Society likewise described it as a science fiction film in its coverage of the Blu-ray release.

== Accolades ==
Award	Year	Category	Recipient(s)	Result
Festigious International Film Festival	2023	Best Picture	Gergő Elekes, József Gallai	Won
Festigious International Film Festival	2023	Best Indie Feature	Gergő Elekes, József Gallai	Won
Festigious International Film Festival	2023	Best Drama	Gergő Elekes, József Gallai	Won
Festigious International Film Festival	2023	Best Actress	Fruzsina Nagy	Won
Festigious International Film Festival	2023	Best Ensemble	Fruzsina Nagy, Edward Apeagyei, Sally Kirkland, Eric Roberts, James Duval, Péter Inoka, Simon Bamford, Karolina Szabó, Zsófia Gallai, László Némethy, Dániel Vince, Zoltán Eőry, Bálint Szántó, Péter József Szabó, Pál Marton, Péter Krenács, Shawn Michael Clankie, Tommy Lentsch, Joseph Richmond, Laura Saxon, Laura Ellen Wilson	Won
Festigious International Film Festival	2023	Best Original Story	József Gallai, Derek C. Block	Won
Vegas Movie Awards	2023	Best Director / Feature	Gergő Elekes, József Gallai	Won
Vegas Movie Awards	2023	Best Cinematography	Gergő Elekes	Won
Vegas Movie Awards	2023	Best Sci-Fi	Gergő Elekes, József Gallai	Won
Vegas Movie Awards	2023	Best Trailer	Sándor Gál	Won
Vegas Movie Awards	2023	Best Ensemble	Fruzsina Nagy, Edward Apeagyei, Sally Kirkland, Eric Roberts, James Duval, Péter Inoka, Simon Bamford, Karolina Szabó, Zsófia Gallai, László Némethy, Dániel Vince, Zoltán Eőry, Péter József Szabó, Bálint Szántó, Shawn Michael Clankie, Tommy Lentsch, Joseph Richmond, Laura Saxon, Laura Ellen Wilson, András Babodi, Péter Krenács, Pál Marton	Won
Vegas Movie Awards	2023	Best Sound Design	Firoze Patel, Kaizad Patel	Won
Black Swan International Film Festival	2023	Best Cinematography	Gergő Elekes	Won
Black Swan International Film Festival	2023	Trailer/Teaser	Gergő Elekes	Won
Black Swan International Film Festival	2023	Best Actor	Edward Apeagyei	Critic's Choice Award
Black Swan International Film Festival	2023	Narrative Feature	Gergő Elekes	Critic's Choice Award
Druk International Film Festival	2023	Horror / Science Fiction / Genre Feature Film	Gergő Elekes, József Gallai	Won
Druk International Film Festival	2023	Film/Video Poster	Gergő Elekes, József Gallai	Won
Druk International Film Festival	2023	International Narrative Feature	Gergő Elekes, József Gallai	Outstanding Achievement Award
Oniros Film Awards	2023	Best Sci-Fi Film	Gergő Elekes, József Gallai	Won
Oniros Film Awards	2023	Best Sound Design	Firoze Patel, Kaizad Patel	Won
Oniros Film Awards	2023	Best Actress	Fruzsina Nagy	Honorable Mention
