= The Covenant with Black America =

2006 non-fiction book by Tavis Smiley

- Author: Tavis Smiley (introduction)
- Language: English
- Publisher: Third World Press
- Publication date: 2006
- Publication place: United States

The Covenant with Black America is a 2006 political, non-fiction book edited by the American talk-show host and writer Tavis Smiley. Its theme is power relations between Black and White Americans. In 2006, the anthology was listed as The New York Times' number one bestseller. Smiley has stated that this was one of his goals for the book and by placing on the list it would make people discuss the book and its contents, as it would "force everyone to talk about it".

The book consists of a collection of ten essays written by scholars and activists who are fighting to balance the scale between White and Black America. They offer a call to action for Black Americans, filled with "practical advice", to close the gap between them and White America. The overall message of the anthology recalls the 1970s campaigns of Jesse Jackson" The anthology's ultimate goal was to help Black America gain social, economic, and political power because without that power, the disparities between Black and White America will continue to grow.

== Contents ==
The Covenant's ten essays, all focused on different areas of social and political disparities, offer theories to help alleviate these disparities. Listed as "Covenants", the ten essays are as follows: "Securing the Right to Health Care and Wellbeing", "Establishing a System of Public Education in Which All Children Achieve at High Levels and Reach Their Full Potential", "Correcting the System of Unequal Justice", "Fostering Accountable Community-Centered Policing", "Ensuring Broad Access to Affordable Neighborhoods That Connect to Opportunity", "Claiming Our Democracy", "Strengthening Our Rural Roots", "Accessing Good Jobs, Wealth, and Economic Prosperity", "Assuring Environmental Justice for All", and "Closing the Racial Digital Divide". Cornel West concludes the book with a final call to action.

== The Ten Covenants ==
=== I: "Securing the Right to Health Care and Wellbeing" ===
By David M. Satcher, M.D., PhD.
As the sixteenth Surgeon General of the United States, Satcher defines health as reflective of both mind and body. In this essay, he elucidates the needs of Black America to have a culture between healthcare provider and patient; in addition, he focuses on the disproportionate representation of Black America in the healthcare system and justice system.

=== II: "Establishing a System of Public Education in Which All Children Achieve at High Level and Reach Their Full Potential" ===
By Edmund Gordon, Ed D.
Edmund Gordon illuminates, in this essay, the relationship between educational opportunity with "race, ethnicity, gender, etc." He attributes this the title of the "Black-White achievement gap".

=== III: "Correcting the System of Unequal Justice" ===
By James Bell.
As the president (and founder) of the W. Haywood Burns Institute, an institute to help communities (like Black America) reach equality, James Bell advocates for justice within the juvenile system and adult justice system in his essay. He calls for help in liberating the members of the Black community that have been imprisoned by the "flawed justice system".

=== IV: "Fostering Accountable Community-Centered Policing" ===
By Maya Harris.

=== V: "Ensuring Broad Access to Affordable Neighborhoods That Connect to Opportunity" ===
By Angela Glover Blackwell.

=== VI: "Claiming Our Democracy" ===
By Wade Henderson.

=== VII: "Strengthening Our Rural Roots" ===
By Oleta Garrett Fitzgerald and Sarah Bobrow-Williams.

=== VIII: "Accessing Good Jobs, Wealth, and Economic Prosperity" ===
By Marc H. Morial.

=== IX: "Assuring Environmental Justice For All" ===
By Robert D. Bullard.

=== X: "Closing the Racial Digital Divide" ===
By Tyrone D. Taborn.
