= The Rich and the Rest of Us =

2012 political nonfiction book

The Rich and the Rest of Us: A Poverty Manifesto
- Author: Tavis Smiley; Cornel West
- Language: English
- Subject: Economic inequality
- Genre: Non-fiction, politics
- Publisher: Third World Press
- Publication date: 2012
- Publication place: United States

The Rich and the Rest of Us: A Poverty Manifesto is a 2012 political, non-fiction book written by talk show host Tavis Smiley and philosopher and political activist Cornel West. The book examines poverty in America and how to eliminate it.
