= Black Prophetic Fire =

2014 book by Cornel West

- Author: Cornel West; Christa Buschendorf
- Language: English
- Publisher: Beacon Press
- Publication date: 2014
- Publication place: United States
- Pages: 248
- ISBN: 978-080700352-7

Black Prophetic Fire, published in 2014 by Beacon Press, is a book by Cornel West in dialogue with and edited by Christa Buschendorf, containing six conversations discussing the lives and legacies of figures in the Black prophetic tradition: Frederick Douglass, W. E. B. Du Bois, Martin Luther King Jr., Ella Baker, Malcolm X, and Ida B. Wells. The six conversations are preceded by an introduction titled "Why We Need to Talk About Black Prophetic Fire" and followed by a conclusion titled "Last Words on the Black Prophetic Tradition in the Age of Obama."

== Reviews ==
Black Prophetic Fire has been reviewed in popular magazines, as well as academic and trade journals:

- Patrik Henry Bass wrote in Essence, "In a unique format, [Cornel West] enlists noted German scholar Christa Buschendorf to interview him. Their conversations, intense and insightful, focus on six activists: Frederick Douglass, W.E.B. Du Bois, Martin Luther King, Jr., Ella Baker, Malcolm X and Ida B. Wells-Barnett. And just when you thought you'd heard it all before, West and Buschendorf provide fresh perspectives on their individual gifts, lasting contributions to the struggle and personal challenges."
- Ryan Herring writing in Sojourners Magazine stated, "In the book, West displays his wealth of knowledge and understanding of those prominent historical black icons and their movements."
- Graeme Abernethy writing in The Journal of American History concluded, "The oratorical format of the book presents certain difficulties. The volume leans too heavily on its detailed notes, grafting a weighty scholarly apparatus onto the less formal main text."
- Vernon Ford in Booklist observed, "Much of this work places the attributes, character traits, and practices of these prophetic personalities in contrast to contemporary leadership in the age of Obama."
- A review in Publishers Weekly expressed the view "Putting aside West's willfully provocative opinions, his mini-lectures, which frequently run uninterrupted for pages at a time, and Buschendorf's instructive set-ups for them do convey a wealth of information."
- Kirkus Reviews summed up its review with "Lively, heated, fighting words -- self-serious but never dull."
