= The Black-Eyed Children =

2025 Hungarian-American horror film

- Release poster
- Directed by: József Gallai
- Written by: József Gallai
- Story by: József Gallai; Roy McClurg Jr.
- Produced by: Natasha Chisdes; Gergő Elekes; József Gallai; Marvin Maddicks Jr.; Tommy Lentsch; Roxanne Rix; Barry Vonk
- Starring: Kata Kuna; Bill Oberst Jr.; Simon Bamford
- Cinematography: Gergő Elekes; József Gallai
- Edited by: Gergő Elekes
- Music by: Gergő Elekes
- Production companies: McClurg Productions; Nguyen Bros. Production; Elekes Pictures; Rix Cafe Texican; Car Trek; Chizfilm Productions; Lentsch Productions
- Distributed by: BayView Entertainment
- Release dates: May 7, 2025 (Philadelphia Independent Film Festival); June 20, 2025
- Running time: 71 minutes
- Countries: Hungary; United States
- Language: English

The Black-Eyed Children is a 2025 found footage horror film written and directed by József Gallai, from a story by Gallai and Roy McClurg Jr. Based on the black-eyed children urban legend, it stars Kata Kuna as a young woman who takes a job at a remote woodland camp, with Bill Oberst Jr. and Simon Bamford in supporting roles.

The film won Best Paranormal Feature at the 2025 Haunted House FearFest and Outstanding International Feature at the 2025 Shawna Shea Film Festival.

== Plot ==
Claire Russell, a student recording a case study video, accepts a temporary post as a counselor at Camp St. Beatrice, an autumn camp in remote woodland whose children are mostly orphans or from families who cannot afford to travel. The camp's managers do not return her calls, but she takes up the job anyway. She arrives to find the site deserted: the children she was hired to look after are gone, and so are the other counselors.

Recording as she goes, Claire searches the cabins and grounds. She finds scattered toys, application forms for children going back fifteen years, and a book of drawings depicting children with black eyes. Among the paperwork are contact details for the missing children's families, and she begins calling the numbers; what she is told disturbs her. She also recovers a memory card holding a recorded message, and a former counselor, Mr. Donahue, appears on video to describe the camp's history and the events that preceded her arrival.

As she explores, Claire becomes convinced she is being watched, and her attempts to leave are frustrated when her vehicle will not start. After dark, some of the missing children return to the camp.

== Cast ==
- Kata Kuna as Claire
- Bill Oberst Jr. as Mr. Donahue
- Simon Bamford as John
- Justin Hayward as Peter (voice)
- Sara Kloc as Emily (voice)
- Laura Ellen Wilson as Lisa (voice)
- Anais Jessica Berinde as Agatha (voice)
- Karolina Szabó as Agatha
- Máté Martin Marton as Alistair
- Regina Fonyó as Aurora
- József Gallai as The Man in Black
- Joseph Richmond as 911 Operator (voice)
- Peter Castro as Radio Announcer (voice)
- Jeffrey Birkin as Radio Announcer (voice)
- Tommy Lentsch as Radio Announcer (voice)
- Anita Lentsch as Woman on the Phone (voice)
- Jennifer Niejadlik as Woman on the Phone (voice)
- Tracy Allen as Woman on the Phone (voice)
- Morgan Lambert as Woman on the Phone (voice)
- Rudy Ledbetter as Man on the Phone (voice)
- Shawn Michael Clankie as Man on the Phone (voice)
- Wendell Blankenship as Man on the Phone (voice)
- Marvin Maddicks Jr. as Police Officer (voice)
- Gergő Elekes as Neighbour (voice)
- Daniela Lugo as Doll (voice)
- Bálint Szántó as Forensic Investigator
- András Babodi as Forensic Investigator

== Production ==
Gallai announced the film in September 2023, unveiling a promotional poster and stating that principal photography would begin the following year. He wrote the screenplay with Roy McClurg Jr., and the earliest announced cast members were Shawn Michael Clankie, Karolina Szabó and Bálint Szabó. In a February 2024 interview, Gallai confirmed that filming would take place that year, describing the project as "an eerie horror/mystery film" that "could easily decide whether I still have a place in this industry".

Visual effects were by Neil Rowe, sound design and re-recording by Alberto Anaya, and dialogue recording and editing by Zsolt Kolláth. Pál Marton worked as still photographer, aerial unit operator and assistant camera, and Bálint Szántó as production coordinator. The soundtrack includes a song by Dane E. Connor and three by Eric Ziegmont's State of Shock.

== Release ==
The film had its world premiere at the 18th Philadelphia Independent Film Festival, held between 7 and 10 May 2025, screening on 8 May at the Canal Street Film Center in Philadelphia. It was later an official selection at the 7th Wallachia International Film Festival in Bucharest, held between 5 and 7 December 2025. BayView Entertainment released the film in June 2025. It is available free with advertising on Tubi and on streaming platforms including Plex.

== Reception ==
David Gelmini of Dread Central rated the film 4 out of 5 and called it "an engrossing found footage mystery", praising its atmosphere, use of an isolated location and slow-burn construction of dread.

Charlie Cargile of PopHorror described the film as creeping and unsettling, crediting its measured pacing and the isolation of its setting. A reviewer for SciFiHistory.Net recommended the film while noting that its narrative feels incomplete in places and that some sequences could have been trimmed.

Michael Li of Film Purgatory and Jim McLennan of Film Blitz both praised the atmosphere while noting occasional weaknesses in the performances. A review at Found Footage Horror Movies found the film tense but at times slow and familiar in its use of the legend.

Lisa Marie Bowman of Through the Shattered Lens called it "an effective and creepy horror film", writing that it "does a very good job of capturing just how creepy being alone in the wilderness can be".

A reviewer for (re)Search my Trash called it "pretty cool genre entertainment", praising Gallai's "rather beautiful and very moody shots", Kata Kuna's performance and "a scene-stopping performance by the always dependable Bill Oberst jr", while questioning the film's use of the found footage format.

Sarah Vincent of Sarah G. Vincent Views was more negative, criticising the film as too talkative and finding its payoff insufficient. Meredith Brown of Upcoming Horror Movies rated the film 7 out of 10, highlighting Kuna's performance.

Darren Lucas of Movies Review 101 called the film "a great addition to the found footage collection", while noting that its pacing "is not going to be for everyone".

== Accolades ==
Award	Year	Category	Result
Haunted House FearFest	2025	Best Paranormal Feature	Won
Shawna Shea Film Festival	2025	Outstanding International Feature	Won
Shawna Shea Film Festival	2025	Outstanding Achievement, International Feature	Nominated
Shawna Shea Film Festival	2025	Outstanding Achievement, Horror Feature	Nominated
Austin After Dark Film Festival	2025	Best International Director	Won
Honor Film Festival	2026	Best Dialogue	Won
