= Mercedes Rose =

Actress

- Born: Mercedes Cochran
- Occupations: Actress, voice-over artist
- Years active: 1997–present
- Spouse: Jeremiah Cook (m. 1993)
- Children: 3
- Website: mercedesrose.com

Mercedes Rose (born Mercedes Cochran) is an American actress and voice-over artist. She is best known as the voice actress of Rosalina in the Mario franchise from 2007 to 2010, beginning with Super Mario Galaxy.

She is also known for portraying the mother of the title character (played by Rose's real-life daughter) in the YouTube series The Haunting of Sunshine Girl.

== Early years ==
Born Mercedes Cochran, Rose graduated from Milwaukie High School in 1990. Her parents were divorced.

== Career ==
She was the original voice of the Mario character Rosalina, having voiced the character in the following games: Super Mario Galaxy, Mario Kart Wii, Super Mario Galaxy 2, and Super Mario 3D All-Stars. She was succeeded by Kerri Kane.

Rose, her daughter (Paige McKenzie), and film producer Nick Hagen formed Coat Tale Productions to produce the YouTube series.

== Personal life ==
Rose married massage therapist Jeremiah Cook in 1993. They have three children.

== Roles ==
=== Movies ===
- Hope
- What the Bleep Do We Know!?
- Train Master
- What the Bleep!?: Down the Rabbit Hole
- The Waiting List
- Train Master 2
- The Bicyclists
- The Haunting of Sunshine Girl: The Movie
- All the Labor
- Caged Animals
- Ravana's Game
- Crackin' the Code
- Did You Kiss Anyone?
- The Falls: Testament of Love

=== Television ===
- Leverage
- Vicky Vixen
- Animus Cross
- Nick Bradley Might Be an Alcoholic
- The Paranormalist
- Funny or Die Presents

=== Video games ===
- Star Trek Online (voice)
- This is Vegas (voice)
- America's Next Top Model (voice)
- Tabula Rasa (voice)
- Earthrise (voice)
- The Blackwell Deception (voice)
- Super Mario Galaxy (voice)
- Mario Kart Wii (voice)
- Super Mario Galaxy 2 (voice)
- Super Mario 3D All-Stars (voice)

=== Online projects ===
- The Haunting of Sunshine Girl

=== Shorts ===
- Hath No Fury
- Will
- Going to the Chapel
- I Am Not a Chair
