= I Hear the Trees Whispering =

2022 mystery thriller film

- Release poster
- Directed by: József Gallai
- Written by: József Gallai
- Produced by: Jon Vangdal Aamaas; Gergő Elekes; József Gallai; Parvez Zabier; Tommy Lentsch
- Starring: Gábor Varga; Laura Saxon; Larry Hankin; Bill Oberst Jr.
- Cinematography: Gergő Elekes; József Gallai
- Edited by: Gergő Elekes
- Music by: Gergő Elekes
- Production companies: Elekes Pictures; Hepifilms; Da Yamms Entertainment; Saxon Productions; Nguyen Bros. Production; Welkin Productions; Lentsch Productions
- Distributed by: BayView Entertainment
- Release date: July 1, 2022
- Running time: 77 minutes
- Countries: Hungary; United States; United Kingdom; Norway
- Language: English

I Hear the Trees Whispering is a 2022 mystery thriller film written and directed by József Gallai. Shot almost entirely from the point of view of its protagonist, it stars Gábor Varga as a man who takes a job as the sole caretaker of a remote stretch of forest, with Larry Hankin and Bill Oberst Jr. in supporting roles. A Hungarian-American-British-Norwegian co-production filmed in Hungary, it was released by BayView Entertainment.

== Plot ==
Will takes a job as caretaker of part of a sprawling forested area known as Lily of the Valley, a post that has sat unfilled for a year and a half. The nearest person to him is his employer, June, fifteen miles away, and supplies are delivered by truck once a week. Exploring the area, he hears a chainsaw but finds only the abandoned saw, and later a bag containing a human finger. His dreams are haunted by memories of his wife, Sara, and his daughter, Lily; he tells June that Sara died in a car accident for which he blames himself. Dale, Lily's grandfather, appears in a video message, and Chuck, the last person to hold the caretaker's job, is heard only as a voice. As small and seemingly insignificant incidents accumulate, events grow stranger rather than clearer. An epilogue introduces two new characters.

== Cast ==
- Gábor Varga as Will (voice)
- Laura Saxon as June (voice)
- Larry Hankin as Dale
- Bill Oberst Jr. as Chuck (voice)
- Anita Tóth as Lily
- Jon Vangdal Aamaas as CEO
- Nyell as Peter
- Beáta Boldog as Sara
- Zsófia Gallai as Young Lily
- Laura Ellen Wilson as Radio announcer #1 (voice)
- Pete Baez as Radio announcer #2 (voice)
- Joseph Richmond as Radio announcer #3 (voice)
- Anais Jessica Berinde as Radio announcer #4 (voice)
- Mindy Dougherty as Radio announcer #5 (voice)
- Shawn Michael Clankie as Radio announcer #6 (voice)

== Production ==
The film was written and directed by József Gallai, whose earlier work includes Spirits in the Dark, Moth and The Poltergeist Diaries. Gallai said it was his first feature since 2013 that was not a horror film, and that he set out to combine adventure, thriller, science fiction and drama. It was made as a Hungarian-American-British-Norwegian co-production, released in Hungary as Rejtekhely, and filmed in Isztimér, Veszprém and Magyarpolány, Hungary, at an aspect ratio of 1.85:1.

Gallai completed the screenplay in the summer of 2020 and revised it during the pandemic lockdown, scouting locations while working on The Poltergeist Diaries. The two lead performances were recorded in the spring of 2021, and principal photography was completed in nine days with a crew of only a few people, with further days shot that summer and in November 2021. A change of cast during production brought Anita Tóth back to the film. Pál Marton worked as still photographer and drone pilot and also appeared on screen.

Gallai shared cinematography with Gergő Elekes, who also composed the score and edited the film. Visual effects were by Neil Rowe. The soundtrack features three songs by Eric Ziegmont's State of Shock ("Caution to the Wind", "If You Were Love" and "Nobody Rides"), along with "Torment" by Joseph Richmond, "The Paragon" by Dane E. Connor and "We're in This Together" performed by Colton. Sound design and mixing were by Joseph Richmond, Logan Compton and Brandon Webster, with Elekes as sound recordist.

Reviewing the film, Jim Morazzini noted that it marked a departure for Gallai, who was known primarily for found footage horror, and compared its first-person camerawork to that of Hardcore Henry while observing that it is not an action film.

== Release ==
The film was screened for critics in January 2022, at which point no release plans had been announced; its soundtrack was made available on streaming services at the end of that month. Shoreline Entertainment handled worldwide sales. BayView Entertainment released the film on 1 July 2022, and it was subsequently made available on streaming platforms including Plex and, free with advertising, Tubi.

== Reception ==
Jim Morazzini of Voices from the Balcony wrote that "Gallai tried something different here, and for the most part it works as long as you don't mind the slow burn", praising the sense of isolation created in the film's first half but noting that "not a lot actually happens" and that the epilogue could prove "a bit divisive as it's somewhat out of tone with what has come before".

Lisa Marie Bowman of Through the Shattered Lens called it "an effectively atmospheric thriller, one that will leave you thinking long after the end credits have rolled", describing the point-of-view technique as one "that allows the film to capture the forest in all of its ominous beauty" and highlighting a third-act twist.

Movies & Mania collected the film's reviews in an overview of the production. Writing for MyIndie Productions, JannyC rated the film 7.5 out of 10 and said that "I Hear the Trees Whispering and its simplicity is what makes the film brilliant", calling the cinematography "award-winning". A reviewer for Road Rash Reviews awarded 5 stars out of 5, writing that "József Gallai has come up with a new way to captivate us with this new film" and that "you will not see the twist coming until it hits you right between the eyes".

The film also drew negative notices. Keri O'Shea of Warped Perspective judged that "there are too many issues and basic mistakes for the twist to work; by that point, patience had long been exhausted", adding that "it feels for all the world like someone had a brief window of time to make a film and just decided to go for it, script and plot be damned". Emily Davison of UK Film Review rated the film 1 star out of 5, writing that "the execution fails to deliver on the most basic function of a film" and that "the fundamental basis of an engaging screenplay is missing here".

== Accolades ==
In a July 2022 review, Emily Davison of UK Film Review wrote that the film had by then won 22 awards at independent film festivals, including six jury prizes.

Award	Year	Category	Recipient(s)	Result
World Film Carnival, Singapore	2022	Postmodern Film		Won
World Film Carnival, Singapore	2022	Supporting Actor	Larry Hankin	Won
World Film Carnival, Singapore	2022	Trailer/Teaser	Gergő Elekes, József Gallai	Won
World Film Carnival, Singapore	2022	Director (Outstanding Achievement Award)	József Gallai	Won
World Film Carnival, Singapore	2022	Cinematography (Outstanding Achievement Award)	Gergő Elekes	Won
World Film Carnival, Singapore	2022	Film Score (Outstanding Achievement Award)	Gergő Elekes	Won
World Film Carnival, Singapore	2022	Sound Design (Outstanding Achievement Award)	Gergő Elekes	Won
Golden Merlion Awards	2022	Best Postmodern Film		Nominated
Golden Merlion Awards	2022	Best Supporting Actor	Larry Hankin	Nominated
Golden Merlion Awards	2022	Best Trailer/Teaser	Gergő Elekes, József Gallai	Nominated
Tagore International Film Festival	2022	Best Cinematography		Won
Sun of the East Awards	2022	Best Cinematography		Nominated
IndieFEST Film Awards	2022	Feature Film	József Gallai	Award of Merit
Rome Prisma Independent Film Awards	2022	Best Feature Film	József Gallai	Finalist
Halicarnassus Film Festival	2022	Best Poster	Andrei Cosma, Gergő Elekes	Won
Casablanca Film Factory Awards	2022	Best Experimental Feature		Won
Casablanca Film Factory Awards	2022	Best Supporting Actor	Larry Hankin	Won
Casablanca Film Factory Awards	2022	Best Supporting Actress	Anita Tóth	Won
Casablanca Film Factory Awards	2022	Best Cinematography	Gergő Elekes, József Gallai	Won
Casablanca Film Factory Awards	2022	Best Trailer	Gergő Elekes, József Gallai	Won
Casablanca Film Factory Awards	2022	Best Poster	Andrei Cosma, Gergő Elekes	Won
Vegas Movie Awards	2022	Best Indie Feature (Award of Prestige)		Won
Vegas Movie Awards	2022	Best Ensemble (Award of Prestige)	Cast	Won
Vegas Movie Awards	2022	Best Original Score (Award of Prestige)	Gergő Elekes	Won
Vegas Movie Awards	2022	Best Original Story (Award of Prestige)	József Gallai	Won
Vegas Movie Awards	2022	Best Cinematography (Award of Merit)	Gergő Elekes, József Gallai	Won
Druk International Film Festival	2022	Best Director	József Gallai	Won
Druk International Film Festival	2022	Best International Narrative Feature (Outstanding Achievement Award)		Won
Druk International Film Festival	2022	Best Cinematography (Outstanding Achievement Award)	Gergő Elekes, József Gallai	Won
High Tatras Film & Video Festival	2022	Best Indie Film		Won
Madras Independent Film Festival	2022	Best Director	József Gallai	Won
The Monthly Film Festival	2022	Trailer of the Month	Gergő Elekes, József Gallai	Nominated
