= Cornel West =

American philosopher, activist, and theologian (born 1953)

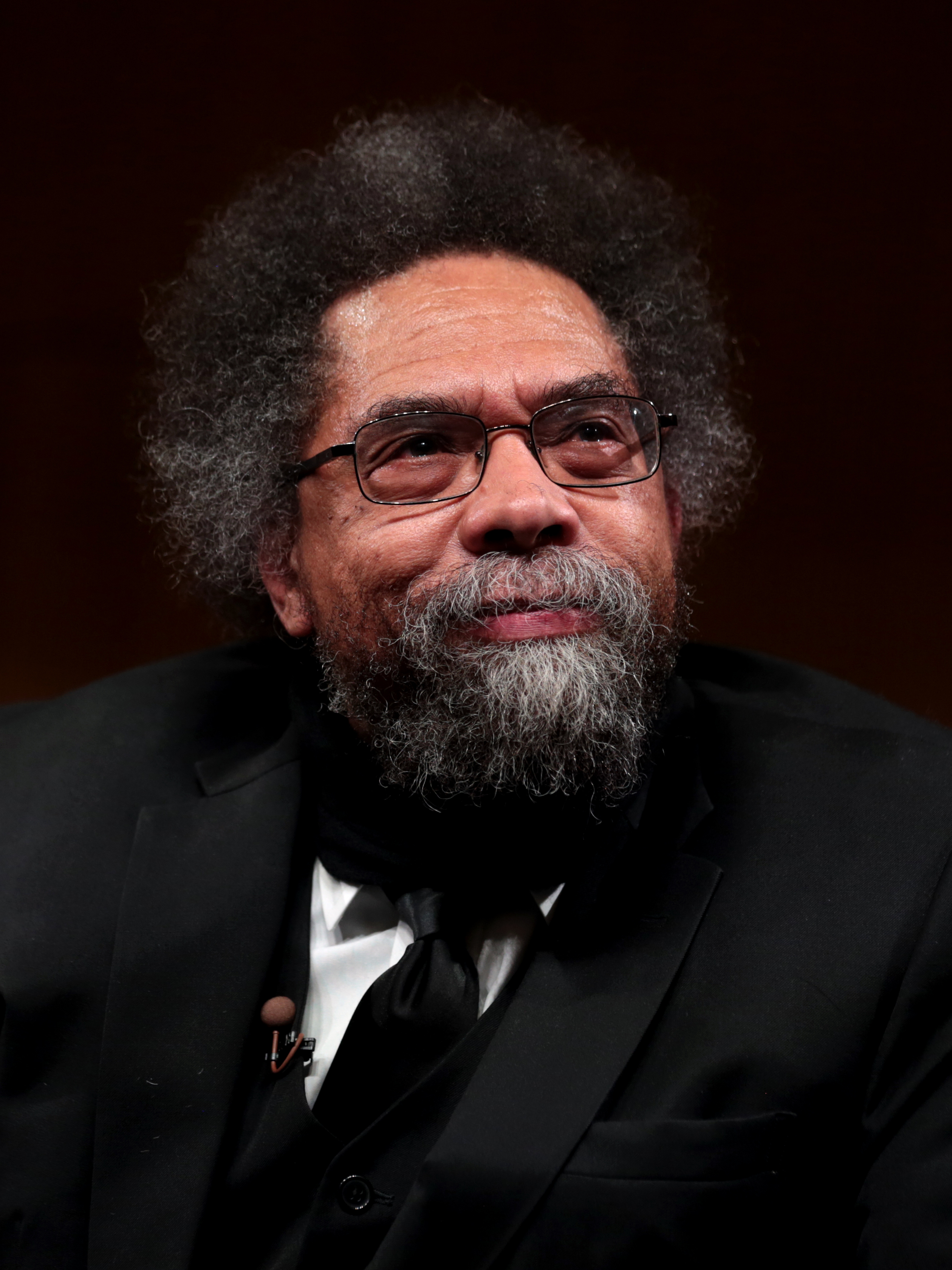
- West in 2018
- Born: Cornel Ronald West; June 2, 1953 (age 73); Tulsa, Oklahoma, U.S.
- Political party: Justice For All Party (since 2024); Independent (since 2023); Green (2023) People's (2023)
- Other political affiliations: Democratic Socialists of America (since 1982)
- Spouses: Hilda Holloman (m. 1977, divorced) Ramona Santiago (m. 1981; div. 1986) Elleni Gebre Amlak (m. 1992, divorced) Leslie Kotkin (m. 2015; div. 2018) Annahita Mahdavi (m. 2021)

Education
- Education: Harvard University (BA); Princeton University (MA, PhD)
- Thesis: Ethics, Historicism and the Marxist Tradition (1980)
- Doctoral advisor: Raymond Geuss, Sheldon Wolin

Philosophical work
- Era: Contemporary philosophy
- Region: Western philosophy
- School: Neopragmatism; Existentialism; Africana philosophy; Historicism; Christian socialism; Radical democracy; Baptist Christianity
- Institutions: Union Theological Seminary; Yale University; Harvard University; Princeton University; Dartmouth College; University of Paris in Saint-Denis
- Doctoral students: Leah Hunt-Hendrix
- Main interests: Political philosophy; philosophy of religion; ethics; race; caste; democracy; liberation theology
- Notable works: Race Matters (1993); Democracy Matters (2004)
- West's voice From an interview published on June 9, 2015
- Website: cornelwest.com

Cornel Ronald West (born June 2, 1953) is an American philosopher, theologian, activist, and public intellectual. West was an independent candidate in the 2024 United States presidential election and is an outspoken voice in left-wing politics in the United States. The grandson of a Baptist minister, West's primary philosophy focuses on the roles of race, gender, and class struggle in American society. A socialist, West draws intellectual contributions from multiple traditions, including Christianity, the black church, democratic socialism, left-wing populism, neopragmatism, and transcendentalism.

During his career, he has held professorships and fellowships at Harvard University, Yale University, Union Theological Seminary, Princeton University, Dartmouth College, Pepperdine University, and the University of Paris in Saint-Denis. Among his most influential books are Race Matters (1993) and Democracy Matters (2004). He has been featured in several documentaries, and made appearances in Hollywood films such as The Matrix Reloaded and The Matrix Revolutions, as well as providing commentary for both films. West has also made several spoken word and hip hop albums.

== Early life and education ==
West was born on June 2, 1953, in Tulsa, Oklahoma, and grew up in Sacramento, California, where he graduated from John F. Kennedy High School. His mother, Irene Rayshell (Bias), was a teacher and principal. His father, Clifton Louis West Jr., was a general contractor for the U.S. Department of Defense. His grandfather Clifton L. West Sr. was pastor of the Tulsa Metropolitan Baptist Church. Irene B. West Elementary School in Elk Grove, California, is named after his mother.

As a teen, West marched in civil rights demonstrations and organized protests demanding Black studies courses at his high school, where he was the student body president. He later wrote that, in his youth, he admired "the sincere Black militancy of Malcolm X, the defiant rage of the Black Panther Party, and the livid Black theology of James Cone".

In 1970, after graduation from high school, he enrolled at Harvard College and took classes taught by the philosophers Robert Nozick and Stanley Cavell. In 1973, West was graduated from Harvard magna cum laude in Near Eastern languages and civilization. He credits Harvard with exposing him to a broader range of ideas and that he was influenced by his professors as well as the Black Panther Party (BPP). West says his Christianity prevented him from joining the BPP, instead choosing to work in local breakfast, prison, and church programs. After completing his undergraduate work at Harvard, West enrolled at Princeton University, where he received a master's degree and a Ph.D. in 1980, completing a dissertation under the supervision of Raymond Geuss and Sheldon Wolin. He became the first African American to graduate from Princeton with a Ph.D. degree in philosophy.

At Princeton, West was heavily influenced by the neopragmatism of Richard Rorty. Rorty remained a close friend and colleague of West's for many years following West's graduation. The title of West's dissertation was Ethics, Historicism, and the Marxist Tradition, which was later revised and published under the title The Ethical Dimensions of Marxist Thought.

== Career ==
=== Academic appointments ===
In his late 20s, he returned to Harvard as a W. E. B. Du Bois Fellow before becoming an assistant professor at Union Theological Seminary in the City of New York. In 1984, he went to Yale Divinity School in what eventually became a joint appointment in American studies. While at Yale, he participated in campus protests for a clerical labor union and divestment from apartheid South Africa. One of the protests resulted in his being arrested and jailed. As punishment, the university administration canceled his leave for the spring term in 1987, leading him to commute from Yale in New Haven, Connecticut, where he was teaching two classes, across the Atlantic Ocean to the University of Paris in Saint-Denis.

He then returned to Union Theological Seminary for one year before going to Princeton to become a professor of religion and director of the program in African American Studies from 1988 to 1994. After Princeton, he accepted an appointment as professor of African American studies at Harvard University, with a joint appointment at the Harvard Divinity School. West taught one of the university's most popular courses, an introductory class on African American studies. In 1998, he was appointed the first Alphonse Fletcher University Professor. West used this new position to teach in not only African American studies, but also courses in divinity, religion, and philosophy. West was also inducted into Omicron Delta Kappa in 1998 at SUNY Plattsburgh.

==== Dispute with Lawrence Summers ====
In 2000, economist and former U.S. Treasury Secretary Lawrence Summers became president of Harvard. Soon after, Summers held a private meeting with West, in which he reportedly rebuked West for missing too many classes, contributing to grade inflation, neglecting serious scholarship, and spending too much time on his financially profitable projects. Summers reportedly suggested that West produce an academic book befitting his professorial position, as his recent output had consisted primarily of co-written and edited volumes. According to some reports, Summers also objected to West's production of a CD, the critically panned Sketches of My Culture, and to his political campaigning, including spending an alleged three weeks to promote Bill Bradley's 2000 presidential campaign. West contended he had missed only one class during his time at Harvard "in order to give a keynote address at a Harvard-sponsored conference on AIDS". Summers also allegedly suggested that since West held the rank of Harvard University Professor and thus reported directly to the president, he should meet with Summers regularly to discuss the progress of his academic production.

Summers refused to comment on the details of his conversation with West, except to state that he hoped that West would remain at Harvard. Soon after, West was hospitalized for prostate cancer. West noted that Summers failed to send him get-well wishes until weeks after his surgery, whereas newly installed Princeton president Shirley Tilghman had contacted him frequently before and after his treatment. In 2002, West left Harvard University to return to Princeton. West criticized Summers in public interviews, calling him "the Ariel Sharon of higher education" on the NPR program The Tavis Smiley Show. In response to these remarks, five Princeton faculty members, led by professor of molecular biology Jacques Robert Fresco, said they looked with "strong disfavor upon his characterization" of Summers and that "such an analogy carries innuendoes and implications ... that many on the Princeton faculty find highly inappropriate, indeed repugnant and intolerable". Harvard's undergraduate student newspaper, The Harvard Crimson, suggested in October 2002 that the premise of the Law and Order: Criminal Intent episode "Anti-Thesis" was based on West's conflicts with Summers.

==== Post ====
In 2002, West returned to Princeton, where he helped found the Center for African American studies in 2006. In 2012, West left Princeton and returned to the institution where he began his teaching career, Union Theological Seminary. He continued to teach occasional courses at Princeton in an emeritus capacity as the Class of 1943 University Professor in the Center for African American Studies. West returned to Harvard in November 2016, leaving Union Theological Seminary for a nontenured position as Professor of the Practice of Public Philosophy. He was appointed jointly at the Harvard Divinity School and the Graduate School of Arts and Sciences Department of African and African American Studies.

In February 2021, reports circulated that West was denied consideration for tenure at Harvard and that he had threatened to leave the university again. On March 8, 2021, West announced that he would leave Harvard and move to the Union Theological Seminary in Manhattan. He submitted a resignation letter to Harvard on June 30, 2021. West implied that the decision to deny him tenure was retaliation for his critical stance on Israel and the Palestinian cause. West wrote:

Is Harvard a place for a free Black man like myself whose Christian faith and witness put equal value on Palestinian and Jewish babies – like all babies – and reject all occupations as immoral?

On July 1, 2021, West rejoined the faculty of Union Theological Seminary in Manhattan, holding the Dietrich Bonhoeffer Chair.

The recipient of more than 20 honorary degrees and an American Book Award, West has written or contributed to more than twenty published books. West is a long-time member of the Democratic Socialists of America, for which he has served as honorary chair. He is also a co-founder of the Network of Spiritual Progressives. West is on the advisory board of the International Bridges to Justice. In 2008, he received special recognition from the World Cultural Council. West is also a member of Alpha Phi Alpha fraternity and its World Policy Council, a think tank whose purpose is to expand involvement of Alpha Phi Alpha in politics and social policy to encompass international concerns.

Hazel Carby compared West to W. E. B. Du Bois as a prolific African-American thinker and has been cited as "[p]erhaps the most influential contemporary recover of Du Bois". By establishing West within Du Bois's tradition of racial thought, Carby emphasized the similarities in their intellectual positions and their aesthetic presences, such as clothing.

West has been widely cited in the popular press. His scholarship has been criticized as well as praised; The New Republic literary editor Leon Wieseltier called West's writing "sectarian, humorless, pedantic, and self-endeared".

In 1997, West was elected as a member of the American Philosophical Society, and in 1999, to the American Academy of Arts and Sciences.

=== Broadcast, film, and recording ===
West appears as Councillor West in both The Matrix Reloaded (2001) and The Matrix Revolutions (2003) and also provides the voice for this character in the video game Enter the Matrix. In addition, West provides philosophical commentary on all three Matrix films in The Ultimate Matrix Collection, along with the integral theorist Ken Wilber.

West has made several appearances in documentary films, such as 2008's Examined Life, a documentary featuring several academics discussing philosophy in real-world contexts. West, "driving through Manhattan, ... compares philosophy to jazz and blues, reminding us how intense and invigorating a life of the mind can be". He also appears in conversation with Bill Withers in the 2009 documentary Still Bill.

West has made frequent appearances on the political talk show Real Time with Bill Maher.

A character based on West and events in his career appeared in the Law & Order: Criminal Intent episode "Anti-Thesis", significant for introducing the recurring villain character Nicole Wallace.

In May 2012, West guest-starred in the sixth season of the American television comedy series 30 Rock, "What Will Happen to the Gang Next Year?".

West recorded a recitation of John Mellencamp's song "Jim Crow" for inclusion on the singer's box set On the Rural Route 7609 in 2009.

In 2010, he completed recording with the Cornel West Theory, a hip hop band endorsed by West.

He also has released several hip-hop-soul-spoken word albums. In 2001, West released his first album, Sketches of My Culture. Street Knowledge followed in 2004. In 2007, West released his third album, entitled Never Forget: A Journey of Revelations, which included collaborations with the likes of Prince, Talib Kweli, Jill Scott, Andre 3000, KRS-One, Killer Mike, and the late Gerald Levert. West appeared on Immortal Technique's song "Sign of the Times", which appeared on the 2011 album The Martyr. In 2012, he was featured on Brother Ali's song "Letter to My Countrymen", which appeared on the album Mourning in America and Dreaming in Color.

West is a frequent conversation partner with his friend Robert P. George, a prominent conservative intellectual, with the two often speaking together at colleges and universities on the meaning of liberal arts education, free speech, and civil dialogue.

In September 2020, he was listed by Prospect magazine as the fourth-greatest thinker for the COVID-19 era.

As of 2020, West is also the co-host, along with Tricia Rose, of the podcast The Tight Rope.

== Activism ==
=== Views on race in the United States ===
West discussing race and human nature in 2019

West has called the U.S. a "racist patriarchal" nation where white supremacy continues to define everyday life. "White America", he writes, "has been historically weak-willed in ensuring racial justice and has continued to resist fully accepting the humanity of Blacks." He goes on to say this has created many "degraded and oppressed people hungry for identity, meaning, and self-worth." West attributes most of the Black community's problems to "existential angst derive[d] from the lived experience of ontological wounds and emotional scars inflicted by white supremacist beliefs and images permeating U.S. society and culture."

In West's view, the September 11 attacks "gave white Americans a glimpse of what it means to be a Black person in the United States", feeling "unsafe, unprotected, subject to random violence, and hatred for who they are". He added that "the ugly terrorist attacks on innocent civilians on 9/11 plunged the whole country into the blues".

West was arrested on October 13, 2014, while protesting against the shooting of Michael Brown and participating in Ferguson October, and again on August 10, 2015, while demonstrating outside a courthouse in St. Louis on the one-year anniversary of Brown's death. The 2015 documentary film #Bars4Justice includes footage of West demonstrating and being arrested in Ferguson.

=== Politics ===
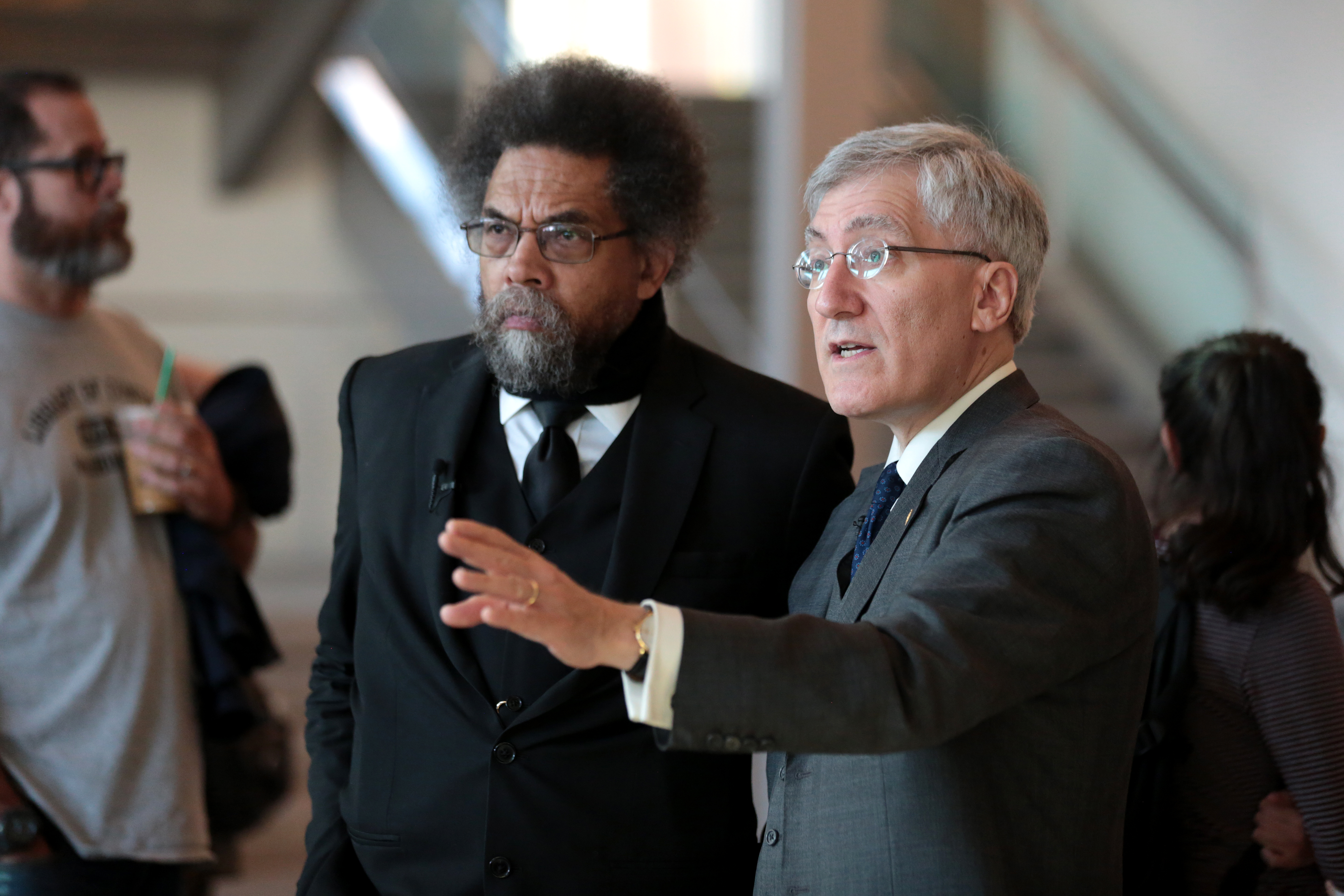
West (left) with Robert P. George (right) in 2018

West has described himself as a "non-Marxist socialist" (partly because he does not view Marxism and Christianity as reconcilable) and previously served as honorary chairman of the Democratic Socialists of America, which he has described as "the first multiracial, socialist organization close enough to my politics that I could join." In the Matrix-themed documentary entitled, The Burly Man Chronicles, he described himself as a "radical democrat, suspicious of all forms of authority".

West has argued "the overthrow of Saddam Hussein's ugly totalitarian regime was desirable," but that the war in Iraq was the result of "dishonest manipulation" on the part of the Bush administration. He asserts that Bush administration hawks "are not simply conservative elites and right-wing ideologues," but rather are "evangelical nihilists – drunk with power and driven by grand delusions of American domination of the world." He adds, "[we now] are experiencing the sad gangsterization of America, an unbridled grasp at power, wealth, and status." Viewing capitalism as the root cause of these alleged American lusts, West warns, "Free-market fundamentalism trivializes the concern for public interest. It puts fear and insecurity in the hearts of anxiety-ridden workers. It also makes money-driven, poll-obsessed elected officials deferential to corporate goals of profit – often at the cost of the common good."

West has been involved with such projects as the Million Man March and Russell Simmons's Hip-Hop Summit, and he has worked with such public figures as Al Sharpton, whose 2004 presidential campaign West advised.

In 2000, West worked as a senior advisor to Democratic presidential candidate Bill Bradley. When Bradley lost in the primaries, West became a prominent and active supporter of Green Party candidate Ralph Nader, speaking at several Nader rallies. Some Greens sought to draft West to run as a presidential candidate in 2004. West declined, citing his active participation in the Al Sharpton campaign. West, along with other prominent Nader 2000 supporters, signed the "Vote to Stop Bush" statement urging progressive voters in swing states to vote for John Kerry, despite strong disagreements with many of Kerry's policies.

In April 2002, West and Rabbi Michael Lerner engaged in an act of civil disobedience by sitting in the street in front of the U.S. State Department "in solidarity with suffering Palestinian and Israeli brothers and sisters". West said, "[w]e must keep in touch with the humanity of both sides". In May 2007, West joined a demonstration against "injustices faced by the Palestinian people resulting from the Israeli occupation" and "to bring attention to this 40-year travesty of justice". In 2011, West called on the University of Arizona to divest from companies profiting from the Israeli occupation of the Palestinian territories.

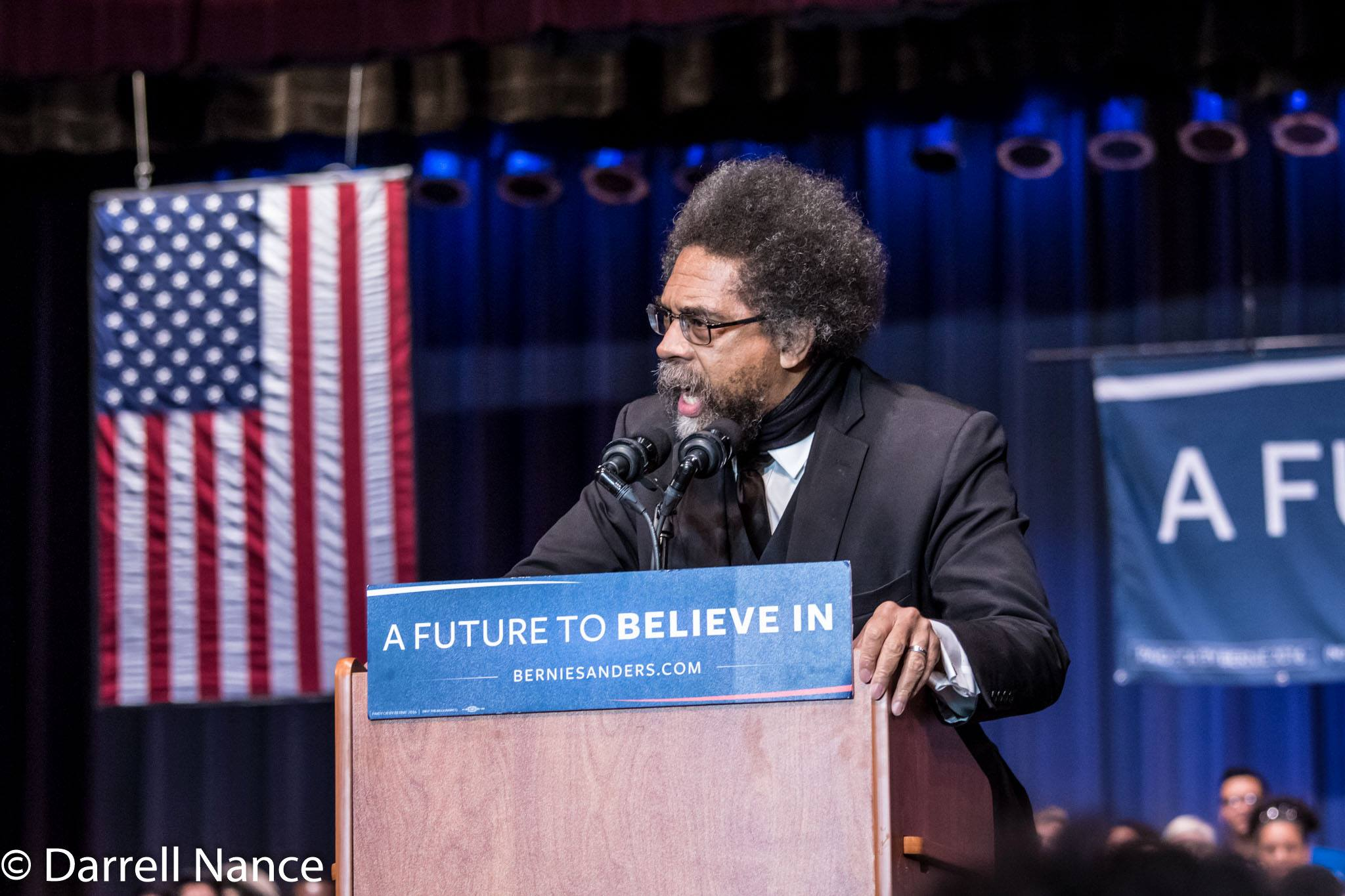
West in January 2016

West also serves as co-chair of the Network of Spiritual Progressives (formerly the Tikkun Community). He co-chaired the National Parenting Organization's Task Force on Parent Empowerment and participated in President Bill Clinton's National Conversation on Race. He has publicly endorsed In These Times magazine by calling it: "The most creative and challenging news magazine of the American left." He is also a contributing editor for Sojourners magazine.

West supports People for the Ethical Treatment of Animals (PETA) in its Kentucky Fried Cruelty campaign, aimed at eliminating what PETA describes as the inhumane treatment of chickens by KFC. West is quoted on PETA flyers: "Although most people don't know chickens as well as they know cats and dogs, chickens are interesting individuals with personalities and interests every bit as developed as the dogs and cats with whom many of us share our lives."

In 2008, West contributed his insights on the global issue of modernized slavery and human trafficking in the documentary Call+Response. West is a member of the Campaign for Peace and Democracy.

In 2011, West expressed his frustration with some critics of Occupy Wall Street, who said the movement lacked a clear and unified message. West replied by saying:

It's impossible to translate the issue of the greed of Wall Street into one demand, or two demands. We're talking about a democratic awakening...you're talking about raising political consciousness so it spills over all parts of the country, so people can begin to see what's going on through a set of different lens, and then you begin to highlight what the more detailed demands would be. Because in the end we're really talking about what Martin King would call a revolution: A transfer of power from oligarchs to everyday people of all colors. And that is a step by step process.

On October 16, 2011, West was in Washington, D.C., participating in the Occupy D.C. protests on the steps of the Supreme Court over the court's decision in the Citizens United v. Federal Election Commission case the previous year. Five days later, he was arrested during an Occupy Wall Street protest in Harlem against the New York Police Department's stop and frisk policy.

In 2014, West co-initiated the Stop Mass Incarceration Network, a project of the Revolutionary Communist Party USA. Later that year, he and RCP chairman Bob Avakian took part in a filmed discussion on "Religion and Revolution".

In August 2017, West was one of a group of interfaith, multiracial clergy who took part in a counter-protest at the Unite the Right Rally in Charlottesville, Virginia; West averred that Antifa had saved their lives.

West is an outspoken supporter of Julian Assange, on one occasion saying: "[Assange] has been simply laying bare some of the crimes and lies of the American empire".

West stated that he believed the Russian invasion of Ukraine was "a criminal invasion, provoked by the expansion of NATO, which is an instrument of U.S. global power" and described the war as a "proxy war between the American Empire and the Russian Federation".

West condemned Israeli war crimes in the Gaza Strip and called for a ceasefire in the Gaza war, saying that the US veto at the UN Security Council "to block a vote to end Israel’s barbaric genocidal campaign in Gaza is an act of spiritual obscenity and moral bankruptcy." He called President Joe Biden a war criminal and said Israel and the US are complicit in the genocide of the Palestinians.

=== Views on Barack Obama ===
West discussing a public feud with Michael Eric Dyson over Barack Obama

West has often spoken about the lack of adequate Black leadership and how it results in doubt within Black communities as to their political potential to ensure change. West publicly supported 2008 Democratic presidential candidate Senator Barack Obama, and spoke to more than 1,000 of Obama's supporters at the Apollo Theater in Harlem, on November 29, 2007. West became a surrogate for Obama, making 65 speeches in support of the campaign, but worried in private that Obama was "the Johnny Mathis of American politics" and had managed to simply glide to victory.

West felt betrayed by Obama's cabinet choices, including his appointments of Robert Gates (who had also served in the preceding Bush administration), James L. Jones, and Dennis Ross to defense and international relations posts and his appointments of Timothy Geithner and Lawrence Summers to key economic positions. He had expected Obama's economic policy would be progressive and Keynesian in nature and led by economists such as Joseph Stiglitz or Paul Krugman.

West criticized Obama when he won the Nobel Peace Prize in 2009, saying that it would be difficult for Obama to be "a war president with a peace prize". West further retracted his support for Obama in an April 2011 interview, stating that Obama is "a black mascot of Wall Street oligarchs and a black muppet of corporate plutocrats. And now he has become head of the American killing machine and is proud of it". In November 2012, West said in an interview that he considered Obama a "Rockefeller Republican in blackface".

In 2011, West participated in a "Poverty Tour" with Tavis Smiley, his co-host on the Public Radio International program Smiley & West. The tour became a two-part special on their radio program, as well as a five-night special on the PBS television program Tavis Smiley. They recounted their experience on the tour in their 2012 bestselling book The Rich and the Rest of Us. The stated aim of the tour was to highlight the plight of the impoverished population of the United States prior to the 2012 presidential election, whose candidates, West and Smiley stated, had ignored the plight of the poor.

West introduces Bernie Sanders at a September 2015 campaign rally in South Carolina

In 2014, West gave an interview criticizing Obama, calling him a "counterfeit" who posed as a progressive. West defined Obama's presidency as "a Wall Street presidency, a drone presidency, a national security presidency".

=== Support for Bernie Sanders ===
In 2015, West expressed his support for Democratic contender Bernie Sanders during an interview on CNN Tonight. West argued that the Sanders plans to redistribute wealth from Wall Street elites to the poorest members of society would be beneficial for the African-American community. On August 24, 2015, West tweeted, "I endorse Brother @BernieSanders because he is a long-distance runner with integrity in the struggle for justice for over 50 years."

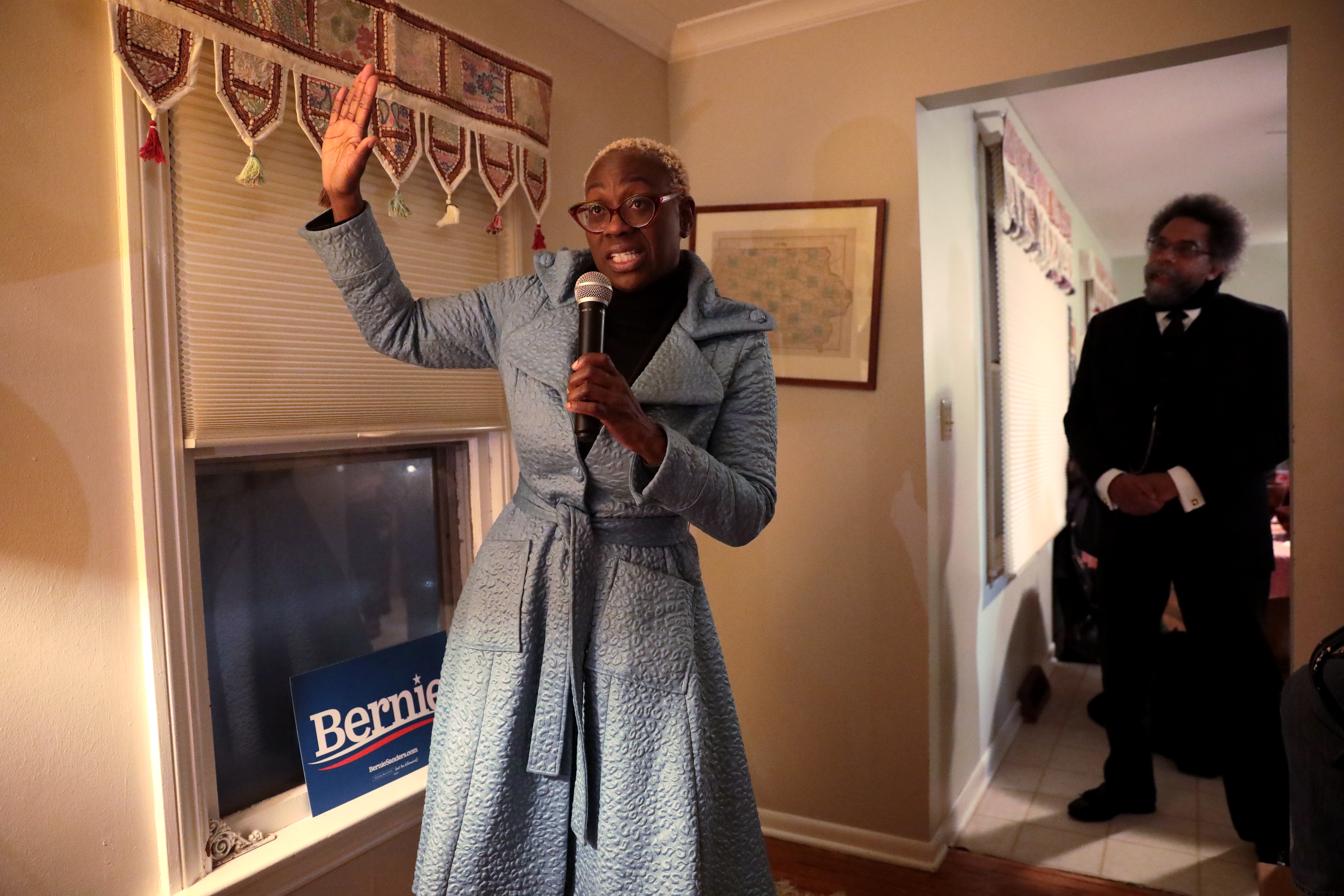
Nina Turner and West campaigning for Sanders in 2020

In July 2016, after Sanders exited the presidential race, West endorsed Green Party nominee Jill Stein and her running mate Ajamu Baraka. West, who was critical of the U.S. interventionist foreign policy in 2016, referred to Democratic nominee Hillary Clinton as a "neoliberal disaster", and accused Clinton of merely posing as a progressive.

Following the victory of Donald Trump, West contended in an op-ed for The Guardian that white working- and middle-class voters "rejected the economic neglect of neoliberal policies and the self-righteous arrogance of elites", yet "supported a candidate who appeared to blame their social misery on minorities, and who alienated Mexican immigrants, Muslims, Black people, Jews, gay people, women, and China in the process."

In 2020, West once again put his support behind Bernie Sanders, who mounted a second presidential bid in that election cycle.

=== 2024 presidential campaign ===
On June 5, 2023, West announced he would run in the 2024 presidential election under the People's Party. West's decision to run with the People's Party sparked criticism due to the party's lack of ballot access, claims of leadership dysfunction, and sexual harassment allegations against the party founder Nick Brana. On June 14, West announced that he would instead seek the Green Party nomination, running a campaign centered around support for Medicare for All, public housing, action on climate change, and drastically cutting the U.S. military budget.

On October 5, 2023, West announced that he was no longer seeking the Green Party nomination, and would instead continue his presidential bid as an independent candidate. On February 1, 2024, West announced the establishment of the Justice For All Party (JFA), which he claimed would pursue a strategy of securing ballot access in specific areas (Florida, North Carolina, and Washington). In August 2024, Cornel West and his running mate Melina Abdullah were both disqualified and denied entry onto the 2024 Michigan presidential election ballot. A week later, a Michigan Court of Claims judge overturned the decision, finding that the state had "misapplied the law" in excluding West and Abdullah from the ballot.

West's campaign received extensive support from Republican and Trump allies to stay on the ballot in swing states in hope that he would take votes from Kamala Harris. West expressed ambivalence about the support from Republicans.

As of August 2024, West was polling below 1% nationally, his campaign was $17,000 in debt, and he was no longer actively campaigning.

== Published works ==
- "Black Theology and Marxist Thought" (1979) – essay
- Prophesy Deliverance! An Afro-American Revolutionary Christianity (1982)
- Post-Analytic Philosophy, edited with John Rajchman (1985)
- Prophetic Fragments (1988)
- The American Evasion of Philosophy: A Genealogy of Pragmatism (1989)
- Breaking Bread: Insurgent Black Intellectual Life (with bell hooks, 1991)
- The Ethical Dimensions of Marxist Thought (1991)
- Prophetic Thought in Postmodern Times: Beyond Eurocentrism and Multiculturalism (1993)
- Race Matters (1993)
- Keeping Faith: Philosophy and Race in America (1994)
- Jews and Blacks: A Dialogue on Race, Religion, and Culture in America (with rabbi Michael Lerner, 1995)
- The Future of the Race (with Henry Louis Gates Jr., 1996)
- Restoring Hope: Conversations on the Future of Black America (1997)
- The War Against Parents: What We Can Do for America's Beleaguered Moms and Dads (with Sylvia Ann Hewlett, 1998)
- The Future of American Progressivism (with Roberto Unger, 1998)
- The Cornel West Reader (1999)
- The African-American Century: How Black Americans Have Shaped Our Century (with Henry Louis Gates Jr., 2000)
- Democracy Matters: Winning the Fight Against Imperialism (2004)
- Commentary on The Matrix, The Matrix Reloaded and The Matrix Revolutions; see The Ultimate Matrix Collection (with Ken Wilber, 2004)
- Hope on a Tightrope: Words & Wisdom (2008)
- Brother West: Living & Loving Out Loud (2009)
- The Rich and the Rest of Us: A Poverty Manifesto (with Tavis Smiley, 2012)
- Pro+Agonist: The Art of Opposition (2012)
- Black Prophetic Fire (2014)
- The Radical King (2016)
- Truth Matters (with Robert P. George, 2025)

== Filmography ==
Film

- Long Distance Revolutionary: A Journey with Mumia Abu-Jamal as himself
- The Matrix Reloaded (2003) as Councilor West
- The Matrix Revolutions (2003) as Councilor West
- Street Fight (2005)
- Examined Life (2008)
- The Private Lives of Pippa Lee (2009) as Don Sexton
- #Bars4Justice (2015) as himself
- Chasing Trane: The John Coltrane Documentary (2016) as himself
- No Safe Spaces (2019) as himself.

Television

- "What Will Happen to the Gang Next Year?" on 30 Rock (2012) as himself

== Discography ==
Albums

- Sketches of My Culture (2001)
- Street Knowledge (2004)
- Never Forget: A Journey of Revelations (2007) (with BMWMB)

Guest appearances

- E-40 – "Born in the Struggle" from Revenue Retrievin': Overtime Shift (2011)
- Bootsy Collins – "Freedumb" from Tha Funk Capital of the World (2011)
- Immortal Technique – "Sign of the Times" from The Martyr (2011)
- Brother Ali – "Letter to My Countrymen" from Mourning in America and Dreaming in Color (2012)
- Terence Blanchard – Choices (2009)
- Terence Blanchard – Breathless (2015)
- Terence Blanchard – Live (2018)

== See also ==
- American philosophy
- Black existentialism
- Christian left
- List of American philosophers
- Robert P. George, an interlocutor and friend of Cornel West

== Sources ==
- Morrison, John (2004). Cornel West. Philadelphia, PA: Chelsea House Publishers. ISBN 978-1-4381-0003-6.
- Naden, Corinne J.; Blue, Rose (2005). Cornel West. Chicago, IL: Heinemann-Raintree Library (division of Reed Elsevier). ISBN 978-1-4109-1040-0. (juvenile nonfiction)

Academic offices
| New office | Alphonse Fletcher University Professor; 1998–2002 | Succeeded by Henry Louis Gates Jr. |
