= Tavis Smiley =

Talk show host and author (born 1964)

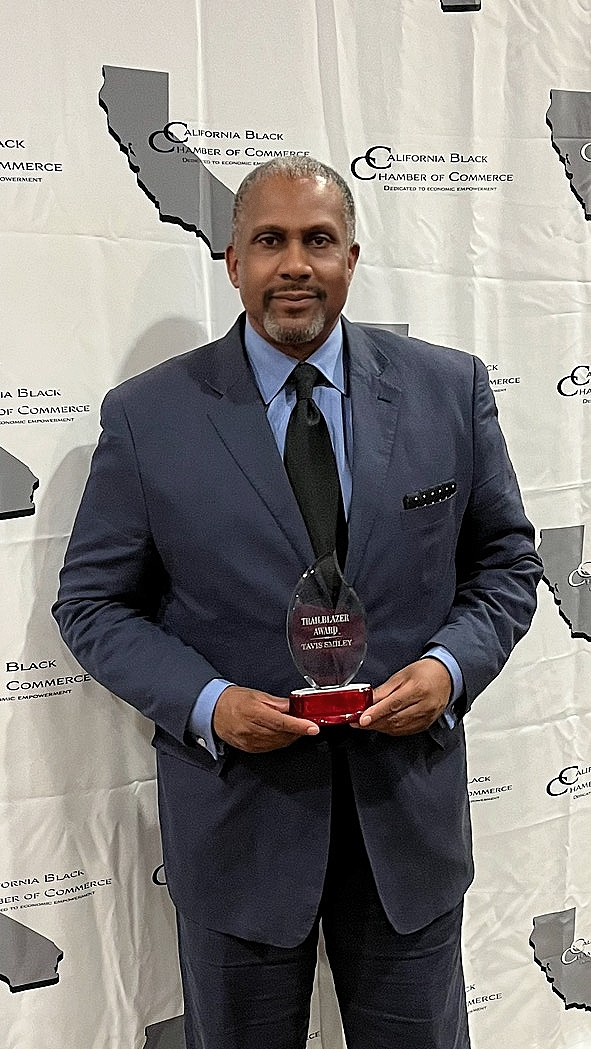
- Smiley in 2022
- Born: September 13, 1964 (age 62); Gulfport, Mississippi, U.S.
- Education: Indiana University (B.A., public affairs, 2003) Maconaquah High School
- Occupations: Talk show host; author
- Years active: 1991–present
- Notable credit(s): Tavis Smiley host KBLA Talk 1580 (2021–present); Tavis Smiley host PBS (2004–2017); The Tavis Smiley Show from PRI (radio) host (2005–2017); Smiley & West co-host (2010–2013); BET Tonight with Tavis Smiley host (1996–2001)
- Website: kbla1580.com

Tavis Smiley (/ˈtævɪs/; born September 13, 1964) is an American talk show host and author. Smiley was born in Gulfport, Mississippi, and grew up in Bunker Hill, Indiana. After attending Indiana University, he worked during the late 1980s as an aide to Tom Bradley, the mayor of Los Angeles.

Smiley became a radio commentator in 1991 and, starting in 1996, he hosted the talk show BET Talk (later renamed BET Tonight with Tavis Smiley) on Black Entertainment Television (BET). After Smiley sold an exclusive interview of Sara Jane Olson to ABC News in 2001, BET declined to renew his contract that year. Smiley then began hosting The Tavis Smiley Show on National Public Radio (NPR) (2002–04) and hosted Tavis Smiley on the Public Broadcasting Service (PBS) on weekdays and The Tavis Smiley Show on Public Radio International (PRI) from 2004 until 2017.

Smiley had an employment dispute with PBS in December 2017 which resulted in his unsuccessfully suing PBS for wrongful termination. Smiley is Founder and Chief Executive Officer of SmileyAudioMedia, Inc., headquartered in Los Angeles. Since June 2021 he has served as Chief Visionary Officer for his radio station, KBLA Talk 1580.

== Early life ==
Smiley was born in Gulfport, Mississippi, the son of Joyce Marie Roberts. On September 13, 1966, his second birthday, his mother married Emory Garnell Smiley, a non-commissioned officer in the U.S. Air Force. A few years later Tavis learned the identity of his biological father, whom he identifies in his autobiography, What I Know For Sure: My Story of Growing Up in America, only as "T".

Smiley's family soon moved to Indiana when his stepfather was transferred to Grissom Air Force Base near Peru, Indiana. On arriving in Indiana, the Smiley family took up residence in a three-bedroom mobile home in the small town of Bunker Hill, Indiana. The Smileys had three more children and added four more after the murder of Joyce's sister. Initially, four of her five children were cared for by their grandmother (known as "Big Mama"), but ill health impaired her ability, and Joyce and Emory took them in. The trailer home sheltered thirteen, including Tavis and his seven brothers and two sisters and the three adults.

Smiley's mother was a deeply religious person, and the family attended the local New Bethel Tabernacle Church, part of the Pentecostal Assemblies of the World. The Smiley children were forbidden from listening to secular music at home or going to the movie theater, and could watch only television shows their parents felt were family-friendly.

When he was in seventh grade, New Bethel pastor Elder Rufus Mills accused Smiley and his siblings of "running wild, disobeying their teacher, disrespecting their teacher, disrespecting the sanctity of this building, and mocking the holy message being taught" during Sunday School. According to Smiley's account of the incident, his Sunday School teacher became confused as she was answering questions about the Book of John, and other students "responded by giggling and acting a little unruly," although he and his sister Phyllis "remained quiet". Garnell whipped Tavis and Phyllis with an extension cord, wounding the two children. The next day at school, administrators found out about the children's injuries. The local newspaper in Kokomo, Indiana, reported on the beating and the legal proceedings against Garnell; Tavis and Phyllis were sent to foster care temporarily. Garnell told his children that the judge decided that he had "overreacted" and found he and Joyce were "concerned parents who were completely involved in [our] children's lives and well-being".

Smiley became interested in politics at age 13 after attending a fundraiser for U.S. Senator Birch Bayh. At Maconaquah High School in Bunker Hill, Indiana, a school that Smiley described as "98 percent white," he was active in the student council and the debate team, even though his parents were "skeptical of all non-church extracurricular activities".

== Education ==
In 1982 Smiley enrolled at Indiana University Bloomington (IU). Because his parents refused to complete financial aid papers, Smiley entered the university with only $50 and a small suitcase. Administrators let Smiley complete the paperwork to become a full-time student. The summer after his first year, Smiley worked, attended summer classes, and lived off campus with Indiana Hoosiers men's basketball players, then being coached by Bob Knight. Smiley was accepted into the Kappa Alpha Psi fraternity during his second year, and became business manager of his dormitory, a member of the student senate, and director of minority affairs. After his friend Denver Smith was killed by Indiana police officers who claimed to have acted in self-defense, Smiley helped lead protests to defend Smith, who he believed had been wrongfully killed. Those protests led him to a work-study internship at the office of Bloomington Mayor Tomilea Allison, where he was paid $5 an hour. Smiley wrote letters to local residents, researched for Mayor Allison, and helped write position papers on local issues. In his autobiography, Smiley says that a deputy mayor caught him systematically adding extra hours to his time sheets, illegal behavior that could have seen him charged with a felony and expelled from college, but instead of pressing charges, Mayor Allison allowed him to work all of the hours for which he had already been paid, and did not tell other people what he had done.

During the first semester of his junior year, Smiley was under academic probation; he blamed his extracurricular activities for interfering with his studies. When Smiley visited Los Angeles to attend a national student leaders' convention, the cousin of his roommate introduced Smiley to football star Jim Brown. Brown introduced Smiley to fellow football player George Hughley, who worked for Los Angeles mayor Tom Bradley and connected Smiley to Mayor Bradley's staff. Every week after meeting Bradley's staff, Smiley wrote a letter to the mayor's office asking for an internship, and once flew to Los Angeles to appeal. However, by summer he received a letter from the city stating that all internship positions were filled. Smiley then handwrote a letter to the mayor that he said represented his feeling "from the heart," and Bradley called Smiley to say that he had a position available for him. Although it counted for college credit, the internship was unpaid, so the Bloomington Community Progress Council funded Smiley with $5,000 for living expenses in Los Angeles, and Brown allowed Smiley to live as a houseguest in September 1985. Starting the following month, Smiley lived in the Kappa Alpha Psi fraternity house at the University of Southern California. At City Hall, Smiley worked at the Office of Youth Development on the 22nd floor.

Smiley twice considered quitting college, first during his junior year, and then after finishing his internship with Mayor Bradley. Bradley persuaded Smiley to return to college. He took the LSAT twice because, he thought he "didn't do great the first time," and he "did a little better" the second time; he intended to apply to Harvard Law School. Instead, Smiley did not graduate from college at all, because he failed a required course in his senior year, and "did poorly in several other courses," which meant he could not complete his degree on time; rather than stay for an extra term, he chose to leave IU and move to Los Angeles, where he had been promised a job. Following a hiring freeze by the government of Los Angeles, Smiley served as an aide to Mayor Bradley until 1990. A 1988 article in the Los Angeles Times identified Smiley as "a Bradley administrative assistant who works in South Los Angeles". In 2003, Smiley officially received his degree from Indiana University in public affairs.

== Career ==
=== Radio commentator ===
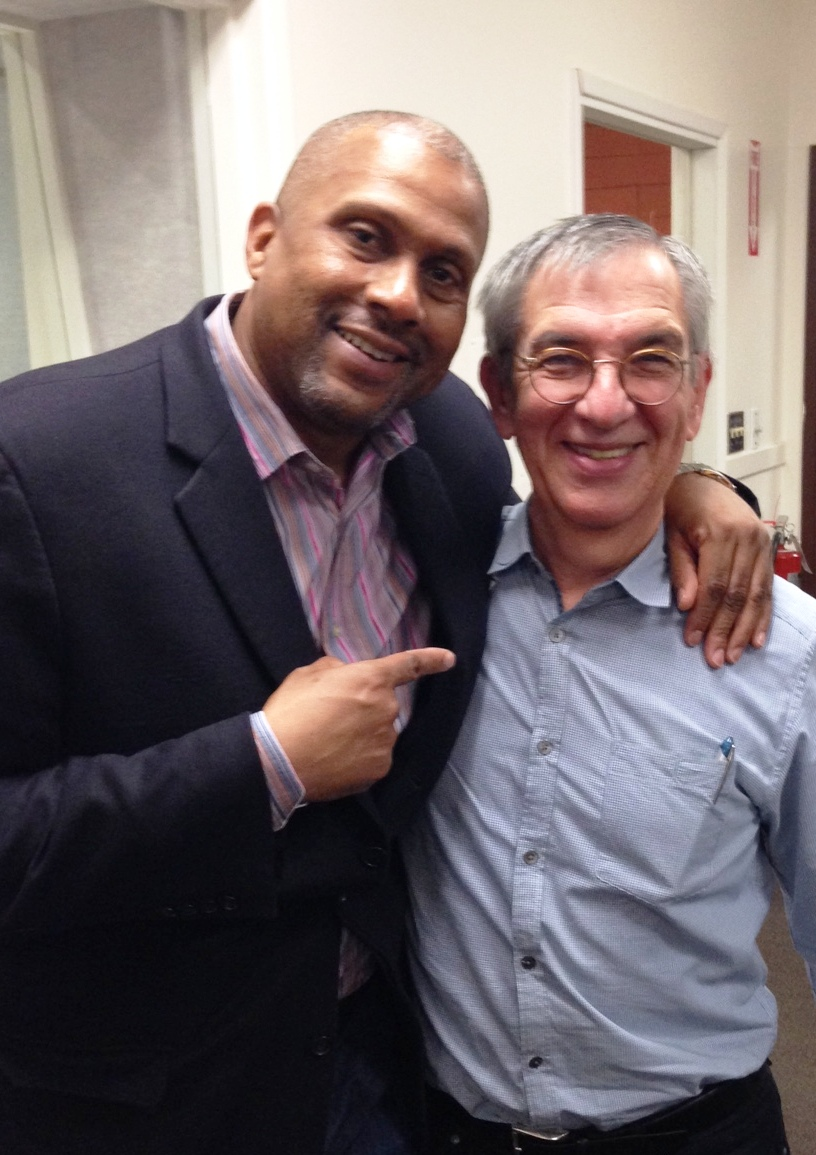
Smiley with historian Jon Wiener on his political podcast entitled Start Making Sense in 2015

Campaigning for a seat on the Los Angeles City Council in 1991 against incumbent Ruth Galanter, Smiley finished fourth among 15 candidates. He became a radio commentator, broadcasting one-minute daily radio segments called The Smiley Report on KGFJ radio. With Ruben Navarrette Jr., Smiley co-hosted a local talk show in Los Angeles where his strongly held views on race and politics, combined with his arguments regarding the impact of institutional racism and substandard educational and economic opportunities for inner-city black youth, earned him attention at the Los Angeles Times. His commentaries focused on local and national current-affairs issues affecting the African-American community. For six months, Smiley worked on a community news program on a local cable network, and spent six more months working on television in Montreal, Quebec, Canada. From 2010 to 2013, Smiley and Cornel West worked together to host their own radio talk show, Smiley & West. They were featured together interviewing musician Bill Withers in the 2009 documentary film Still Bill. He was the new host of Tavis Talks on BlogTalkRadio's Tavis Smiley Network.

In 1996 Smiley became a frequent commentator to the Tom Joyner Morning Show, a nationally syndicated radio show broadcast on black and urban stations in the United States. He developed a friendship with host Joyner.

=== BET Tonight show ===
Also in 1996 Smiley began hosting and executive producing BET Tonight (originally BET Talk when it first premiered), a public affairs discussion show on the Black Entertainment Television (BET) network. He interviewed major political figures and celebrities, and discussed topics ranging from racial profiling and police brutality to R&B music and Hollywood gossip.

==== Firing from BET ====
Smiley hosted BET Tonight until 2001 when, in a controversial move, the network announced that Smiley's contract would not be renewed. This sparked an angry response from Smiley, who sought to rally his radio audience to protest BET's decision. Robert L. Johnson, founder of BET, defended the decision, stating that Smiley had been fired because he had sold an exclusive interview to ABC News without first offering the story to BET, even though Smiley's contract with BET did not require him to do so. Smiley countered with the assertion that he had offered the story—an interview with Sara Jane Olson, an alleged former member of the Symbionese Liberation Army—to CBS, which, along with BET, was owned by Viacom. Smiley ultimately sold the interview to rival network ABC, he said, only after CBS passed on the interview, and suggested that his firing was payback for the publicity he gained as a result of providing an exclusive interview to ABC. Ultimately, BET and Viacom did not reverse their decision to terminate Smiley's contract.

=== NPR talk show ===
Smiley was then offered a chance to host a radio talk show on National Public Radio. The Tavis Smiley Show was broadcast daily from January 2002 to December 16, 2004, in Los Angeles, when Smiley decided not to renew his contract with NPR. The show was a news and opinion program focusing upon issues of race, diversity, and ethnicity and often featured guest speakers. It was an hour-long show. Some of the reasons cited based on an article by Howard Kurtz for not renewing the contract were 1) Tavis Smiley wanted to tape his show a day in advance, and NPR did not agree; 2) against federal funding policies, Tavis Smiley wished to own the right to rebroadcast the show; and 3) Tavis Smiley appealed to have the budget for promoting the program significantly increased, and NPR did not have the budget to do so. It was announced in 2004 that he would be leaving his show, citing the network's inability to reach a more diverse audience.

It was replaced on some radio stations by News & Notes which follows much the same format and topics. Many other radio stations replaced it with the short-lived NPR News with Tony Cox.

==== Smiley leaves NPR ====
Smiley launched a weekly version of his radio program The Tavis Smiley Show on April 29, 2005, distributed by NPR rival Public Radio International (PRI). It was a one-hour weekly program featuring interviews with news makers, thought leaders and artists and seeks to bring diverse perspectives to the airwaves. It was produced by Smiley Radio Properties, Inc., in partnership with PRI at Smiley's studio in Los Angeles, California. The program ran two hours per week until October 2010 when the second hour became the sister program Smiley & West, co-hosted by longtime Smiley collaborator Dr. Cornel West. The show ended after thirteen years of broadcast in December 2017.

=== Move to PBS ===
Smiley also hosted Tavis Smiley, a late night talk show televised on the Public Broadcasting Service (PBS) network and produced in association with WNET in New York.

In March 2006, The Smiley Group and Third World Press published The Covenant with Black America, a collection of essays by black scholars and professionals edited by Smiley. The book covers topics ranging from education to healthcare, and was a New York Times Bestseller.

Smiley moderated two live presidential candidate forums in 2007: a Democratic forum on June 28 at Howard University in Washington, D.C., and a Republican forum on September 27 at Morgan State University in Baltimore.

=== Dancing with the Stars ===
On September 4, 2014, it was announced that Smiley would be competing on the 19th season of Dancing with the Stars. He paired with professional dancer Sharna Burgess. They were eliminated on the second week of competition and finished in 12th place.

=== Firing from PBS ===
In 2017, Smiley was accused of violating the morals clause of his contract. Smiley denied the allegations and sued PBS citing wrongful termination. The court ultimately ruled in PBS's favor, ordering that Smiley compensate PBS $2.6 million.

=== KBLA Radio ===
As of 2021, Smiley hosts a radio show on KBLA Talk 1580 from 9am to noon PT on weekdays, and he is also host of the Tavis Smiley Podcast in conjunction with KBLA.

== Media appearances ==
In 2000, they began hosting annual town hall meetings called "The State of the Black Union," which were aired live on the C-SPAN cable television network. Each of these town hall meetings focused on a specific topic affecting the African-American community, featuring a panel of African-American leaders, educators, and professionals, assembled before an audience, to discuss problems related to the forum's topic, as well as potential solutions. Smiley also used his commentator status on Joyner's radio show to launch several advocacy campaigns to highlight discriminatory practices in the media and government, and to rally support for causes such as the awarding of a Congressional Gold Medal to civil rights icon Rosa Parks. Smiley also began building a national reputation as a political commentator with numerous appearances on political discussion shows on MSNBC, ABC, and CNN. Smiley has appeared on the Democracy Now! podcast. and Real Time with Bill Maher.

== Controversy ==
=== TSU dispute ===
In 2005, Smiley donated and raised thousands of dollars for Texas Southern University. The School of Communication was temporarily named after him, before TSU and Smiley mutually agreed to remove his name.

=== Barack Obama commentary ===
On April 11, 2008, Smiley announced that he would resign in June 2008 as a commentator on the Tom Joyner Morning Show. He cited fatigue and a busy schedule in a personal call to Joyner. However, Joyner, referring to several commentaries in which Smiley was critical of Democratic presidential candidate Barack Obama, indicated otherwise on his program, stating: "The real reason is that he can't take the hate he's been getting regarding the Barack issue—hate from the black people that he loves so much."

In 2012, Smiley participated in a "Poverty Tour" with Princeton University professor Cornel West to promote their book The Rich and the Rest of Us: A Poverty Manifesto. The stated aim of the tour was to highlight the plight of the impoverished population of the United States prior to the 2012 presidential election, whose candidates Smiley and West stated had ignored the plight of the poor.

=== Sexual misconduct allegations ===
On December 13, 2017, PBS indefinitely suspended Smiley. PBS issued a statement saying that it had hired a law firm to conduct an investigation "immediately after learning of troubling allegations regarding Mr. Smiley" and that this investigation "uncovered multiple, credible allegations of conduct that is inconsistent with the values and standards of PBS."

On December 14, 2017, Smiley described the PBS investigation as "biased and sloppy" and said he would fight the allegations and the damage to his reputation. He released a statement saying, "I have the utmost respect for women and celebrate the courage of those who have come forth to tell their truth", and "To be clear, I have never groped, coerced or exposed myself inappropriately to any workplace colleague in my entire broadcast career, covering six networks over 30 years".

Soon after the suspension, Smiley went on a country-wide tour to defend his innocence and denouncing workplace harassment. In 2018, Smiley sued PBS for wrongful termination while PBS countersued claiming a breach of a morals clause in his contract. PBS prevailed and on August 5, 2020, Smiley was ordered to pay PBS $2.6 million in damages.

== Honorary degrees ==
Smiley was honored with the NAACP Image Award for best news, talk, or information series for three consecutive years (1997–99) for his work on BET Tonight with Tavis Smiley. Smiley's advocacy efforts have earned him numerous awards and recognition including the recipient of the Mickey Leland Humanitarian Award from the National Association of Minorities in Communications. In 1999, he founded the Tavis Smiley Foundation, which funds programs that develop young leaders in the community. Since its inception, more than 6,500 young people have participated in the foundation's Youth to Leaders Training workshops and conferences.

- 2007 – Smiley gave a commencement speech at his alma mater, Indiana University at Bloomington, Indiana (the university recently honored Smiley by naming the atrium of its School of Public and Environmental Affairs (SPEA) building, The Tavis Smiley Atrium).
- 2008 – Smiley gave the commencement address at Connecticut College, where he was awarded an honorary doctorate. On December 12, 2008, Smiley received the Du Bois Medal from Harvard University's W.E.B. Du Bois Institute for African and African American Research.
- 2009 – Smiley was awarded an honorary doctorate at Langston University after giving the commencement address there. He was also awarded the 2009 Interdependence Day Prize from Demos in Istanbul, Turkey.

== In popular culture ==
Smiley was named No. 2 change agent in the field of media behind Oprah Winfrey in Ebony magazine's "Power 150" list.

Time added him in 2009 as one of the "100 Most Influential People in the World".

In 2014, Smiley received a star on the Hollywood Walk of Fame, honoring his contributions to television.

Smiley is referenced in the KRS-One song "Clear 'Em Out."

== Bibliography ==
External videos
- Presentation by Smiley on Hard Left, August 21, 1996, C-SPAN
- Booknotes interview with Smiley on Doing What's Right, April 9, 2000, C-SPAN
- Washington Journal interview with Smiley on How to Make Black America Better, January 26, 2001, C-SPAN
- Interview with Smiley on What I Know for Sure, October 15, 2006, C-SPAN
- Q&A interview with Smiley on What I Know for Sure, October 29, 2006, C-SPAN
- Discussion with Smiley and Cornel West on The Rich and the Rest of Us, April 20, 2012, C-SPAN
- Washington Journal interview with Smiley and Cornel West on The Rich and the Rest of Us, September 13, 2012, C-SPAN
- Interview with Smiley on Death of a King, May 30, 2014, C-SPAN
- Presentation by Smiley on Death of a King, September 19, 2014, C-SPAN
- Q&A interview with Smiley on Death of a King, November 9, 2014, C-SPAN
- Interview with Smiley on My Journey With Maya, April 18, 2015, C-SPAN
- Washington Journal interview with Smiley on The Covenant With Black America: Ten Years Later,, January 15, 2016, C-SPAN

- Smiley, Tavis (1993). Just a thought: The Smiley report, 1991-93. Los Angeles, Calif: Pines One Pub. ISBN 0963695231. OCLC 30158977.
- — (1996). Hard left: Straight talk about the wrongs of the right. New York: Anchor Books. ISBN 0-385-48404-6. OCLC 34115509.
- — (2001). Doing what's right: How to fight for what you believe-- and make a difference. New York: Anchor. ISBN 0-385-49931-0. OCLC 45724843.
- — (2004). Keeping the faith: Stories of love, courage, healing, and hope from Black America. New York: Anchor Books. ISBN 0-385-72169-2. OCLC 54402663.
- — (2002). How to make Black America better : leading African Americans speak out. New York: Anchor Books. ISBN 0-385-72087-4. OCLC 47739261.
- — (1998). On air: The best of Tavis Smiley on the Tom Joyner morning show: Thoughts on culture, politics & race. Los Angeles, CA: Pines One Pub. ISBN 1-890194-33-6. OCLC 39310218.
- —, ed. (2006). The covenant with black America. Chicago: Third World Press. ISBN 0-88378-277-4. OCLC 64432411.
- — (2006). What I know for sure: My story of growing up in America. New York: Doubleday. ISBN 0-385-50516-7. OCLC 67240857.
- — (2009). Accountable: Making America as good as its promise. New York: Atria Books. ISBN 978-1-4391-0004-2. OCLC 233939628.
- — (2011). Fail up: 20 lessons on building success from failure. Carlsbad, Calif: SmileyBooks Distributed by Hay House. ISBN 978-1-4019-3390-6. OCLC 697261211.
- with West, Cornel (2012). The rich and the rest of us: A poverty manifesto. New York Carlsbad, Calif: SmileyBooks Distributed by Hay House. ISBN 978-1-4019-4063-8. OCLC 778425910.
- — (2014). Death of a King: The real story of Dr. Martin Luther King Jr.'s final year. New York: Little, Brown and Company. ISBN 978-0-316-33276-7. OCLC 868040473.
- with Ritz, David (2015). My journey with Maya. New York, NY: Hachette Audio. ISBN 978-1-4789-5829-1. OCLC 900668237.
- —, ed. (2016). The Covenant with Black America - ten years later. Carlsbad, California: SmileyBooks. ISBN 978-1-4019-5149-8. OCLC 928750900.
- — (2016). 50 for your future: Lessons from down the road. Carlsbad, California: SmileyBooks. ISBN 978-1-4019-4839-9. OCLC 907495007.
- — (2016). Before you judge me: The triumph and tragedy of Michael Jackson's last days. New York: Little, Brown and Company. ISBN 978-0-316-25909-5. OCLC 923649828.
