= The Haunting of Sunshine Girl =

Supernatural horror web series

The Haunting of Sunshine Girl is an ongoing supernatural horror web series that is currently broadcast on YouTube. The series was created by Paige McKenzie, Nick Hagen, and Mercedes Rose, and is produced by Coat Tale Productions. The series first launched in 2010 and its premiere episode was uploaded on December 10, 2010. The Haunting of Sunshine Girl quickly rose in popularity and between December 2010 to October 2011 the show received more than 4.3 million total hits. The average length of the episodes is about two minutes but can run less depending on the episode and content.

The cast of The Haunting of Sunshine Girl is entirely composed of unknown actors. McKenzie, the series's lead actress, did not initially identify herself by her real name, choosing instead to use the pseudonyms Sunshine Girl and Frances Jones until she revealed her real name in June 2013. She stars in the series along with her mother Mercedes Rose, Maxwell Arnold, Seth Renne, and Adrienne Vogel. The series is filmed at Hagen's home in Vancouver, Washington and other places in Washington and Oregon.

The Haunting of Sunshine Girl tells the story of a teenage girl documenting the paranormal activity in her house. She uploads the short episodes on her YouTube channel.

== Plot ==
=== Season #1: The Original Haunting ===
When Sunshine and her mother (Mercedes Rose) move into a new house, Sunshine begins experiencing paranormal activity. She decides to document her experiences in order to prove to her mother that the activity is real. Later, a strange woman (Adrienne Vogel) shows up at her house and warns Sunshine that the house is not safe. Meanwhile, the paranormal activity grows and gets more intense.

Sunshine receives a photograph of a man and a girl, both with bags over their heads, along with a note reading: "They are watching you." Later, the two ghosts show themselves. The strange woman returns to give a box to Sunshine Girl, warning her not to open it. The box seems to stop the haunting, but it has a foul odor, and Sunshine and her mother open it. The ghosts return, worse than before. One of the ghosts attacks Sunshine Girl, keeping her locked in a bathroom, while the other ghost burns the strange photograph.

Sunshine asks the mysterious woman for help. Using a smudge stick, the stranger purifies Sunshine's house. The ghosts vanish, and Sunshine's mother finally believes they were real.

=== Season #2: The Oregon Coast Road Trip ===
This season has more of a documentary feel, featuring interviews with real people, while continuing the plot. Sunshine and her mother take a roadtrip to Oregon in search of more haunted places. Along the way, Sunshine meets Anna, one of the ghosts haunting her house. Sunshine records strange EVP and hears a voice say "don't trust her."

=== Season #3: The Cult and the Demon ===
After returning home, Sunshine Girl begins a search for her father. She finds an address that her mother was keeping from her, and, believing it might be her father's new home, she visits the place only to learn that it is a frightening abandoned house. Inside the house, she finds a copy of the same photograph of the man and girl, who she now knows are the spirits haunting her house. While returning home, a strange man tries to kill her. She hits him with her car, only to have him stand up again. Finally she escapes.

Sunshine discovers that her mom is possessed by a demon. She finds a local paranormal expert that is calling himself "LeMaster" (Rhyan Schwartz) and a medium called Alistair (Christopher Toyne). Alistair visits the home, where his mouth begins to bleed. He warns Sunshine not to trust her mom. Furious, Sunshine's mom orders the medium to leave. Later, Sunshine calls Alistair, only to learn that he has died.

Meanwhile, LeMaster discovers that two ghosts belonged to a cult. The members have to sacrifice their first-born daughters to a demon—the same demon that has possessed Sunshine's mom. LeMaster does not want to become involved in this haunting and rejects Sunshine's pleas for help.

Desperate, Sunshine uses her ouija board to contact the spirits. At that moment, the mysterious woman returns, revealing that her name is Victoria. She shows Sunshine the place where the cultists sacrificed their daughters, and tells Sunshine that the only way to save her mom is by pretending to sacrifice herself.

During the sacrificial ceremony, the demon appears. Victoria tries to protect Sunshine, but the demon cuts her throat. Victoria disappears.

While Sunshine waits in the rain with a bag sheltering her head, the man from the abandoned house appears, removes the bag, and tells her that the demon cannot take her because she is a luiseach: a person with paranormal powers used to fight evil. After the man has gone, Sunshine's mom and Uncle Tommy (Seth Renne) find her. In the next video Sunshine reveals that her name is Frances Jones.

=== Season #4: Paranormal Powers ===
At the beginning of Season 4, Nolan, a 19-year-old boy, learns that Sunshine Girl is a luiseach. Nolan persuades Sunshine to stay a night in his grandmother's haunted house. There they meet Frederick, a very violent and dangerous ghost. With Victoria's help, Sunshine delivers Frederick from being a ghost and ends the haunting.

Sunshine finds another anonymous letter in the mail showing a warehouse. Sunshine and Nolan go there, but can find nothing—until they see a man driving away. The man appears to have followed them.

Nolan tells Sunshine that he hears voices. He invites a paranormal expert to go to Sunshine's house, but the expert turns out to be LeMaster. Nolan's voices tell Nolan that LeMaster is evil and is after Sunshine because of her luiseach powers. Nolan, terrified and desperate of protecting Sunshine, shoots LeMaster, who at first appears dead. Suddenly he stands up and threatens Sunshine with a demonic voice. Nolan and LeMaster both disappear.

Nolan begins to appear and disappear in Sunshine's house. Sunshine searches for any evidence that Nolan really existed, but even Nolan's grandmother does not remember him. Sunshine returns to the photograph of the warehouse and finds a hidden message reading 3 a.m.. At 3 AM, Sunshine, her mother, and Uncle Tommy go to the warehouse, where they meet Victoria. Victoria tells Sunshine that Nolan is an awaken - a person that had a Near Death Experience and after that has paranormal abilities such as Astral projection. She then tells Sunshine after they find Nolan that her father was a luiseach, but he turned over to the Markons and turned evil.

Sunshine finds an 8 mm film in her garden. This film shows a girl being sacrificed by a strange man and a woman Sunshine recognizes as Victoria. The season ends with Sunshine meeting the ghost-girl Anna. She removes the bag from Anna's head, finally revealing that she is the sacrificed girl from the film.

=== Season #5: Stranger Turns ===
Victoria suddenly shows up to ask Sunshine if she still trusts her. Sunshine answers: "Not really." Despite that Victoria gives the ceremonial knife to Sunshine and asks her to sacrifice her once she has to. Then one night Sunshine hears her mother screaming and Sunshine went downstairs and Victoria showed up telling Sunshine that she needs to know the difference between what is real and what is paranormal. Later, Victoria introduces Sunshine to a man that is claimed to be her mentor. Sunshine experiences much paranormal activity. Nolan visits Sunshine's house and tells her that he had a dream when Sunshine's father had a demon on a leash and he kept on repeating, "We're coming to get you!" A third ghost shows itself in one of her videos. She has a white dress and her hair is almost completely over her face. The paranormal activity in the house is getting worse, and in one video Uncle Tommy spit up that compost again and was bleeding from his face. Victoria comes and says that she wants to do another ritual (the first ritual was the sacrifice) but this one involves burning the house down. Sunshine has also confirmed that they are moving. Victoria returns and tells Sunshine that she was not a Luiseach but a normal teenage girl (which may be hinted that Sunshine's powers were possibly removed for her safety). The Markons had decided to forget about Anna and she did not need Sunshine's help any more. The seasons ends with Sunshine and her mom moving out of the house.

=== Season #6: The Cabin in the Woods ===
For Sunshine's high school graduation, her mother decides to take her to a "haunted" cabin in the woods. They stay in the cabin for a few days and they start experiencing paranormal activity going on. Sunshine then finds a guest book to the house that contains a name that says that the ghost wants his dog Rex. They later on go outside and they find a metal gold box that contains the dog, Rex in it. It turns out that Rex is a stuffed animal dog. Later on they leave the house for a little bit to get away from the ghost. They come home and the dog is on a bed upstairs. A few nights later the lights go out and there is crazy stuff happening. The boy was not found but he touched Sunshine. Then they leave.

=== Season #7: The Haunted River House ===
In this less spooky, more humorous season, Sunshine meets Nolan's mom, who says that she knows of a haunted house that Sunshine should check out. Also, the "paranormal investigators" from The Investigation of Haunting of Sunshine Girl keep calling her. They meet up at the haunted river house and they check it out but not that much happens. At the end they do however find out what causes the so-called hauntings.

=== Season #8: A New Haunted House ===
Sunshine and her mom Kat have moved to a different house, but they are still experiencing paranormal phenomena; voices coming from the ventilation system and kitchen drawers opening by themselves. When Sunshine visits Nolan in his new apartment, the ghost seems to have followed her there. In one episode the haunting is more intense than in previous seasons and episodes, and Kat is briefly possessed. Sunshine discovers that the ghost speaks Latin.

=== Halloween Special: A Halloween Haunted Adventure! ===
In this Halloween special, Sunshine girl, Kat and Nolan visit a haunted house. When they arrive, they find the door open, with a note indicating that the owner have fled from the house. They go inside anyway and look around, which turns out to be a bad idea, especially for Nolan.

=== Season #9: Nolan is missing then found ===
Since the Halloween events, Nolan is missing. Sunshine is worried about him and starts to investigate. She meets Nolan's brother Colin, who is also looking for Nolan. She tricks Nolan in showing up, using some psychology, after which Nolan and Colin become rivals for Sunshine's friendship. In the meantime minor paranormal activity takes place - Anna the ghost is playing with the lights and the Latin speaking ghost makes himself heard - but the focus of this season is on Nolan's and Sunshine's friendship.

=== Season #10: Answers about the ghosts ===
Season 10 is longer than most previous seasons, and consists of 86 episodes, just short of Season One, The Original Haunting, which has 88. The seasons can be broken up into different parts, set in different locations, but all having the same underlying theme; Sunshine learning about ghosts and learning to control and use her luiseach powers. The first part it set in Sunshine's home, where paranormal activities are more prominent than before. The second part is set at the haunted house of a couple, Jamie and Patrick, who are not telling the whole truth. In the third part Sunshine and Nolan visit the haunted recording and sound editing studio of Marc, where they experience very strange and frightening phenomena. The fourth part is mostly set at Sunshine's home again, followed by a part where Victoria takes her to a training house to further develop her skills. In the final part Sunshine, Nolan and uncle Tommy set out to find Sunshine's father, which leads to a dramatic climax.

=== Found Videos ===
In this section, Sunshine Girl posts videos of paranormal activity that have been sent by fans or that she has found on the internet. The videos include popular myths and urban legends such as Black Eyed Kids or Slender-man.

=== The Investigation of The Haunting of Sunshine Girl ===
The Investigation of The Haunting of Sunshine Girl (included in season #5) is a video uploaded on 5/16/12 which is 14:15 long (filmed on March 10, 2012). A paranormal team tries to prove if Sunshine's ghost videos are real or a hoax. After a night of terrifying paranormal activity, the investigators flee the house.

== Cast and characters ==
Character	Portrayed by	Seasons													
Character	Portrayed by	1	2	3	4	5	6	7	8	9	10	11	12	13	14
Sunshine Girl, Frances Jones:(2010–2013)	Paige McKenzie	Main	Main	Main	Main	Main	Main	Main	Main	Main	Main	Main	Main	Main	Main
Kat Jones	Mercedes Rose	Main	Main	Main	Main	Main	Main	Main	Main	Main	Main	Main	Main	Main	Main
Victoria; Creepy Lady:(2010–2012)	Adrienne Vogel	Main		Main	Main	Main	Recurring		Main	Main	Main	Main	Main		Main
Uncle (Thomas) Tommy	Seth Renne			Guest	Main				Main	Recurring	Main	Main	Main		Main
Nolan	Maxwell Arnold				Main	Main		Main	Main	Main	Main				Main
Herself	Lil' Sunshiner													Recurring	Main
Anna (Ghost)	N/A	Main		Main	Main	Main			Guest		Main	Recurring			Guest
Mellowb1rd	Himself^{1}		Main												
LeMaster (Baily)	Rhyan Schwartz			Recurring											
Alistar	Christopher Toyne			Recurring											
Mystery Man	Jerry L. Buxbaum			Recurring											
Gary Thompson^{2}	Darius Pierce					Main		Main							
Lionel^{2}	Geno Romo					Main		Main							
Nolan's Grandma	N/A				Guest										
Marcie (Nolan's Mom)	Ritah Parrish							Recurring		Guest					
Colin (Nolan's Brother)	N/A									Guest					
Himself^{3}	Myles Webb										Main	Main			
Goth Girl	Tabitha Knight											Main			

- Paige McKenzie as Sunshine Girl (Season 1-present): Sunshine Girl is a typical teenager and high school student. She likes collecting old things and listening to Vampire Weekend. She doesn't have many friends, but she spends a lot of time with her mother or with her video camera. It is not until the end of Season 3 that she reveals a fake name to avoid any online stalkers, which is Frances Jones. Finally, she reveals her real name, Paige Mckenzie, due to participating in Seventeen Magazine's Pretty Amazing contest.
- Mercedes Rose as Kat (Season 1-present): Kat is Sunshine's mother. She is cheerful and funny, and she regards her only daughter as a good friend. Although she had interest in paranormal phenomena when she was young, she is a skeptic. Her relationship to Sunshine's father is an important point in the story's plot since she does not like to talk about that time of her life. Uncle Tommy tells Sunshine that Kat disappeared one day and came back later with a little child.
- Adrienne Vogel as Victoria (Main: Seasons 1, 3–5, 8–12, and 14-present. Recurring: Season 6): Victoria is a strange woman who earns the nickname "Creepy Lady" during Seasons 1 and 3. Her job is to protect Sunshine Girl and she shows up whenever Sunshine is in danger.
- Seth Renne as Uncle Tommy (Guest: Season 3, Main: Seasons 4, 8, 10–12, 14-present. Recurring: Season 9): "Uncle" Tommy is a family friend who is close to Kat and who has known Sunshine since she was a child. Sunshine is very close to him.
- Maxwell Arnold as Nolan (Main: Seasons 4–5, 7, 9–10, 14-present. Guest: Season 8): Nolan is a 19-year-old boy. Ten years ago he had a near-death experience. Since then, he can hear voices, astrally project, and does not age. Although Sunshine Girl always states that he would not be her boyfriend, they build a very special relationship. He said he loved her but she never said it back, even though she probably does.
- Lil' Sunshiner as herself (Recurring: Season 13. Main: Season 14-present): Lil' Sunshiner is sunshine Girl's (McKenzie) #1 fan since mid-2015. She and her family encounter a ghost wearing a black cloak. Sunshine Girl babysits her and which encounter a ghost which could be caused by the Ghost of Anna.
- N/A as Ghost of Anna (Main: Seasons 1, 3–5, and 10. Recurring: Season 11. Guest: Seasons 8, 14): Anna is the first ghost to encounter Sunshine and her family. She is not the only one, her father and other ghosts appear besides her. In season 10, she warns Sunshine about her father.
- Mellowb1rd as himself (Main: Season 2): Mellowb1rd was a guest host for season 2 while Sunshine and her mother Kat were away.
- Rhyan Schwartz as LeMaster (Baily) (Recurring: Season 3): LeMaster helps Sunshine and Kat with the ghosts or demons. After the incident, he no longer needs Sunshine's plea for help
- Christopher Toyne as Alistar (Recurring; Season 3): Alistar is Sunshine Girl's other helper
- Jerry L. Buxbaum as Mystery Man (Recurring: Season 3): Is a strange man when Sunshine was looking for her father in an abandon house. He saw Sunshine and chased her out of the house. Sunshine and Kat returned to find her locket. He was nowhere in sight after the chase.
- Darius Pierce as Gary Thompson (Main: Season 5, 7): The leader of the paranormal activities who helps Sunshine and Nolan with the ghost in the river house
- Geno Romo as Lionel (Main: Season 5, 7): Gary's partner who is also in the paranormal activities who helps Sunshine and Nolan in Season 7
- N/A as Nolan's Grandma (Guest: Season 4): Nolan and Colin's grandmother which she only appears when Nolan went missing
- Ritah Parrish as Marcie (Recurring: Season 7, Guest: Season 9): Nolan and Colin's mother. In season 7, she called Sunshine about her recent ghost activities in her river home. In season 9, she break up Nolan and Coin's fight about Sunshine.
- N/A as Colin (Guest: Season 9): Nolan's brother and Marcie's second son. He and Nolan fight about Sunshine before their mom broke up the fight.
- Myles Webb as himself (Main: Seasons 10–11): Is one of Sunshine's friends. During season 10, he send Sunshine his ghost experience. Then he helps Sunshine and Victoria in Season 11.
- Tabitha Knight as Goth Girl (Main: Season 11): She sends her ghost experience like Myles
- ^{1} Mellowb1rd guest host while Sunshine (McKenzie) and Kat (Rose) was on their Haunted Hotel Road Trip
- ^{2} Gary and Lionel a.k.a. The Real Paranormal Investigators were in Sunshine and Kat's old home during season 5
- ^{3} Myles helped out Sunshine (McKenzie) and Victoria (Vogel) in Season 11

== Production ==
In December 2010 Hagen approached actress Mercedes Rose with the idea to create a paranormal web-based show, as he noted that the word "ghost" was a common search term. Rose later described the idea as "Gilmore Girls meets Paranormal Activity with a little Easy A thrown in." The show would be unscripted and center around a "girl trying to prove her house is haunted". Hagen and Rose then enlisted Rose's daughter, Kat McKenzie, to star as the series's main character. From there the three worked on the series's concept and chose to develop the story as the series progressed, as they "wanted something that we could keep doing on YouTube but could also be expanded into a bigger "universe" with these paranormal rules and characters we’ve set up." McKenzie chose to base the character upon herself, as she felt that the channel "wouldn’t feel genuine if it felt like I was putting on some sort of act." McKenzie did not initially reveal her name to viewers until 2013, a move that she later stated was due to fear of stalkers.

Most episodes are filmed with a flip camera by the actors themselves. This filming format was chosen as it would allow them to film multiple episodes at a time, which would make it easier to post new videos each week. Hagen noted that he had to use specific keywords that would allow for the best search-engine optimization, which made it easier for users to find and enable them to have "100,000 views within weeks" without having to actively promote the channel. Aside from optimization, McKenzie found that interacting with fans also raised the series's visibility and viewership numbers. Fans can interact with McKenzie via her social media accounts and by sharing videos. The channel became a YouTube Partner in 2011 and during 2014 made $4,000 to $6,000 a month via ads.

In 2013 McKenzie took part in a scholarship competition in Seventeen magazine, where she ran under her real name and mentioned The Haunting of Sunshine Girl. This contest attracted the attention of a literary agent, who helped finalize a deal with the Weinstein Company to produce a book and television series based on The Haunting of Sunshine Girl.

== Spin-Offs ==
=== Sunshine's World ===
Sunshine's World is another YouTube channel by Coat Tale Productions. There is no plot. Sunshine Girl just posts videos about her visiting a pumpkin farm, a shop in Portland or showing her posters to the audience. It is the vlog of an 18-year-old girl. The last upload to this channel was March 9, 2018.

=== Uncle Tommy's YouTube Confessions ===
Uncle Tommy's YouTube Confessions is the first spin-off based on a supporting character of "The Haunting of Sunshine Girl". It is an interactive series in which the audience sends secret confessions via comment or email to "Uncle Tommy," which he and friends might then read on the show. Occasionally Kat or Sunshine Girl appear in Uncle Tommy's videos.

== Feature films ==
=== Sunshine Girl and the Hunt for Black Eyed Kids ===
In November 2011 Coat Tale Productions launched a Kickstarter project to fund a feature film, In Search of Black Eyed Kids (later retitled Sunshine Girl and the Hunt for Black Eyed Kids). The film would follow Sunshine and other series characters as they search for black-eyed children, an urban legend surrounding supernatural creatures. The Kickstarter campaign met its goals, but Mercedes Rose later stated that the majority of the funding came from friends, family, and members of their film community.

Filming for Sunshine Girl and the Hunt for Black Eyed Kids began in January 2012 in Portland, Oregon, and was produced in association with Lyon Films. The movie was released on DVD in December 2012 and is available via download.

=== THR33 ===
In November 2013 McKenzie launched an Indiegogo project to fund a second feature film, then temporarily titled Alone, and the campaign raised $2,480. The film is set during the 1980s and centers around a girl (played by McKenzie) stuck in a cabin with a ghost. The film's name was later changed to Three (also stylized as Thr33) and filming commenced in 2014. Thr33 was released on 29 January 2016.

=== Crescendo Short Film ===
This short film was Written, Directed, and Edited by Nick Hagen and Produced by Mercedes Rose. A Coat Tale Productions film. Starring Rhyan Schwartz as Adam, Paige McKenzie as Ella, Dan Considine as Charles, and Maria Olsen as Mrs. Black. This short film was released on Oct 28, 2014.

== Books ==
In 2014 the Weinstein Co. announced that they had closed a multiplatform deal to adapt The Haunting of Sunshine Girl into a young adult novel and film franchise. On March 24, 2015 The Haunting of Sunshine Girl was released in hardback, e-book, and audiobook via Weinstein Books, and follows the same plot as the web series's first story arc. Critical reception for the book was mixed, with some outlets criticizing the work for being too similar to other supernatural young adult novels while others praised it for its character interactions and chills.

On March 1, 2016, the sequel to The Haunting of Sunshine Girl was released titled The Awakening of Sunshine Girl in hardback, e-book, and audiobook via Weinstein Books, and like its predecessor had many praises for the scary plot and deep character development and criticism for the lack originality based on other supernatural young adult novels.

The third and final book, "The Sacrifice of Sunshine girl", was released April 4, 2017. The book completed the trilogy and was also based on the hit YouTube channel.

== TV show ==
In March 2015 McKenzie announced that there were plans for the Weinstein Co. to adapt The Haunting of Sunshine Girl into either a feature film or television show, along with a novel. The following month McKenzie issued a press release stating that it had been decided that they would progress with a television show rather than a film, as they felt that "TV would be an easier transition." The series will be based on the novel released in September 2015 and will have McKenzie in the starring role.
