= Simon Bamford =

English actor

- Education: Mountview Academy of Theatre Arts
- Occupation: Actor
- Known for: Butterball Cenobite in Hellraiser and Hellbound: Hellraiser II

Simon Bamford is an English film, television and stage actor. He is well known for playing the Butterball Cenobite in Hellraiser (1987), and its sequel Hellbound: Hellraiser II (1988). Other credits include Nightbreed (1990), Book of Blood (2009), Dead of the Nite (2012), the Dark Ditties film series (2017–2019), and The Black-Eyed Children (2025).

== Career ==
Simon graduated from Mountview Academy of Theatre Arts in 1981. At the Young Vic in London, he played Ernst Robel in Spring Awakening, At the Chichester Festival Theatre he played opposite Nicholas Parsons and Ruthie Henshall as 'Gabby' in Follow the Star, In Cairo and Bucharest he performed in The Complete Works of William Shakespeare (Abridged) and played Roy in Neville's Island. He played the Butterball Cenobite in the first two Hellraiser films. He also created and played the role of Ohnaka in Clive Barker's film Nightbreed (1990).

In 2009, he played Derek in Book of Blood (2009), for Matador Pictures, Gary in Dead of the Nite (2012), shot in Cardiff and joined the season finale to Dark Ditties presents ‘Stained’ and the anthology film Mosaic. On television, he can be seen in the SKY TV 'Better Effect' commercials. In 2000, he won actor of the year award for his portrayal of Pip in Great Expectations at the Vasa Theatre in Stockholm, and has also designed and directed several international tours including The Big Day in Sofia, Qatar and Dubai as well as Educating Rita in Kuala Lumpur.

Mountview was an executive producer and actor in the Dark Ditties series (2017–2019) on Amazon Prime. He has been a theatre reviewer for The Stage since 2006, and a guest speaker at film conventions in Bottrop, Münster, and London.

== Filmography ==
- Hellraiser (1987) - Butterball Cenobite
- Hellbound: Hellraiser II (1988) - Butterball Cenobite
- Nightbreed (1990) - Ohnaka
- Book of Blood (2009) - Derek
- Dead of the Nite (2012) - Gary
- Riley (2013) - The Man
- Parson & Son (2013) - Mr Parson
- The 4th Reich (2013) - Unterscarfuhrer Kraus
- Starfish (2016) - Senior Consultant
- You're So Cool, Brewster: The Story of Fright Night (2016, documentary; in-character host) - Peter Vincent
- Dark Ditties presents The Offer (2017) Jonathon Brook Davies
- Dark Ditties presents Mrs Wiltshire (2018) Alison Wiltshire & Jonathon Brook Davies
- Dark Ditties presents Finders Keepers (2018) Mr Wainwright
- Dark Ditties presents The Witching Hour (2019) - Leslie Topper
- The Haunting of Margam Castle (2020) - Witchfinder General
- 14 Ghosts (2021) Mr Peindre
- Aftermath (2024) - Alpha (voice)
- The Black-Eyed Children (2025) - John

=== Audio ===
Year	Title	Role	Notes
2025	The Temple of the Killer Tiger Monkeys	Weuifo	Podcast series

=== Self ===
- Hellraiser: Resurrection (2000)(V) - Himself
- Hellbound: Hellraiser II - Lost in the Labyrinth (2000)(V) - Himself
- Demons to Others: The making of 'Hellraiser: Prophecy' (2007) - Himself

=== Archival footage ===
- Boogeyman: The Killer Compilation (2001)(V) -Butterball Cenobite ('Hellraiser')

== See also ==
- Cenobite
