= BayView Entertainment =

American film production and distribution company

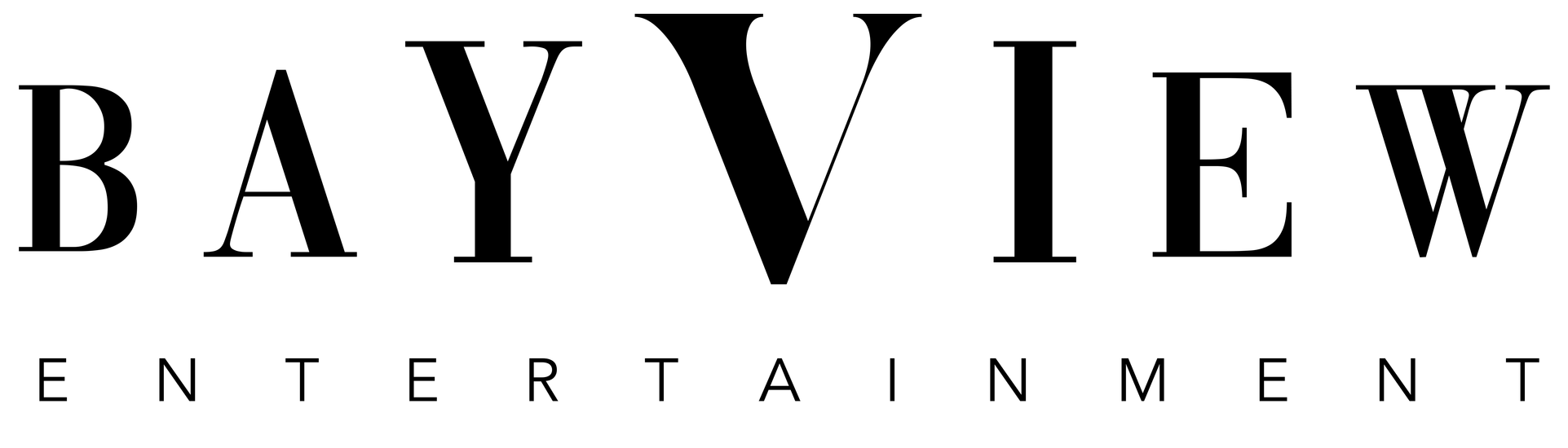
- Type: Distributor and producer of independent films
- Industry: Film
- Founded: 2005
- Headquarters: Pompton Plains, New Jersey, U.S.
- Key people: Peter Castro
- Products: Motion pictures
- Subsidiaries: Monterey Media; Passion River Films
- Website: bayviewentertainment.com

BayView Entertainment is an American independent film production and distribution company based out of Pompton Plains, New Jersey. In 2015, BayView distributed One Deadly Summer (1983) on physical media. BayView produced the film Skinamarink (2023), which was acquired by Shudder. In 2023, BayView took over Passion River Films after buying out most of the company's assets. In 2026, FlareFlow microdramas by COL Group International were acquired by BayView Entertainment for distribution in North America.

== Films ==
=== 2000s ===
| Release date | Title | Director(s) | Production | Ref. |
|---|---|---|---|---|
| 2007 | Bad | Ron McLellen | Southlan Films | |
| 2009 | Buddy Bebop Vs Living Dead | Justin Cash Kirkpatrick | CineXperia Productions | |

=== 2010s ===
| Release date | Title | Director(s) | Production | Ref. |
|---|---|---|---|---|
| 2015 | Burning Bodhi | Matthew McDuffie | BCD Travel | |
| 2016 | Trinity | Skip Shea | Racconti Romani | |
| 2017 | The Dead Half | David Van Hooser | Light Hand Productions | |
| 2018 | The Tag-Along: The Devil Fish | David Chuang | Ambassador Theatres | |
| 2018 | The Bastard Sword | Eveshka Ghost | Rusalka Pictures | |
| 2019 | Insanity | Miska Kajanus | Piilo Productions | |

=== 2020s ===
| Release date | Title | Director(s) | Production | Ref. |
|---|---|---|---|---|
| 2020 | Entombed | Kjell Hammerø | Little Rain Films | |
| 2020 | Nothing Else | Timoth Conrad | Timamu Movies Production | |
| 2020 | Nuns: An Italian Horror Story | Giovanni Aloisio | —N/a | |
| 2020 | Ravenstein | Eveshka Ghost | Rusalka Pictures | |
| 2021 | Continuance | Tony Olmos | Rosewood Five | |
| 2021 | Todd | Aaron Warren | Pain Productions LLC | |
| 2021 | My Dead Ones | Diego Freitas | Parakino Filmes | |
| 2021 | Winifred Meeks | Jason Figgis | October Eleven Pictures Ltd. | |
| 2022 | The Game Ends | Meto Ege | Power Styles Films | |
| 2022 | The Traveler | Meto Ege | Power Styles Films | |
| 2022 | Red | Don Tjernagel | Donzilla, Inc. | |
| 2022 | Everybody Gets Stabbed | Levon J Polinelli | Catface Productions | |
| 2022 | Skinamarink | Kyle Edward Ball | ERO Picture Company | |
| 2022 | I Hear the Trees Whispering | József Gallai | Elekes Pictures | |
| 2023 | I Am Gitmo | Philippe Diaz | Cinema Libre Studio | |
| 2023 | Hemet, or the Landlady Don't Drink Tea | Tony Olmos | Charybdis Pictures | |
| 2024 | Aftermath | Gergő Elekes and József Gallai | McClurg Productions | |
| 2024 | A Stranger in the Woods | József Gallai | McClurg Productions | |
| 2024 | The Omicron Killer | Jeff Knite | Dark Knites entertainment | |
| 2025 | The Black-Eyed Children | József Gallai | McClurg Productions | |
| 2025 | Everyone Asked About You | John Lacy | —N/a | |
| 2026 | Mamochka | Vilan Trub | Trub Film Co. | |
