= Boogeymen: The Killer Compilation =

2001 film by Tom Sito, Piet Kroon

- Production company: FlixMix
- Release date: October 2, 2001
- Running time: 56 minutes
- Country: United States
- Language: English

Boogeymen: The Killer Compilation is a horror compilation video released in 2001 by FlixMix. Marketed as "The Killer Compilation," the film consists of seventeen scenes from notable, revolutionary horror titles, along with short screens describing the apropos villain.

== Cast ==
- Note: all footage is archive footage

Actor	Role	Film	Notes
Doug Bradley	Pinhead	Hellraiser (1987)	—N/a
Nicholas Vince	Chatterer	Hellraiser (1987)	—N/a
Grace Kirby	Female Cenobite	Hellraiser (1987)	—N/a
Simon Bamford	Butterball Cenobite	Hellraiser (1987)	—N/a
Ashley Laurence	Kirsty Cotton	Hellraiser (1987)	—N/a
Andrew Robinson	Frank Cotton (disguised in Larry Cotton's skin)	Hellraiser (1987)	—N/a
Robert Englund	Freddy Krueger	A Nightmare on Elm Street (1984)	—N/a
Heather Langenkamp	Nancy Thompson	A Nightmare on Elm Street (1984)	—N/a
Amanda Wyss	Tina Gray	A Nightmare on Elm Street (1984)	—N/a
Nick Corri	Rod Lane	A Nightmare on Elm Street (1984)	—N/a
Andrew Divoff	Djinn	Wishmaster (1997)	—N/a
Gunnar Hansen	Leatherface	The Texas Chain Saw Massacre (1974)	—N/a
Marilyn Burns	Sally Hardesty	The Texas Chain Saw Massacre (1974)	—N/a
Edwin Neal	Hitchhiker	The Texas Chain Saw Massacre (1974)	—N/a
Roger L. Jackson	Ghostface	Scream (1996)	Voice
Neve Campbell	Sidney Prescott	Scream (1996)	—N/a
Warwick Davis	Leprechaun	Leprechaun (1993)	—N/a
Brad Dourif	Chucky	Child's Play 2 (1990)	Voice
Beth Grant	Miss Kettlewell	Child's Play 2 (1990)	—N/a
Tony Todd	Candyman	Candyman (1992)	—N/a
Virginia Madsen	Helen Lyle	Candyman (1992)	—N/a
Paolo Rotondo	Simon Cartwright	The Ugly (1997)	—N/a
Muse Watson	The Fisherman	I Know What You Did Last Summer (1997)	—N/a
Sarah Michelle Gellar	Helen Shivers	I Know What You Did Last Summer (1997)	—N/a
Jenny Seagrove	Camilla	The Guardian (1990)	—N/a
Corbin Bernsen	Dr. Alan Feinstone, D.D.S.	The Dentist (1996)	—N/a
Angus Scrimm	The Tall Man	Phantasm (1979)	—N/a
Michael Baldwin	Mike Pearson	Phantasm (1979)	—N/a
Bert Rosario	Blade	Puppet Master (1989)	Voice
Ed Cook	Pinhead	Puppet Master (1989)	Voice
Tim Domberg	Tunneler	Puppet Master (1989)	Voice
Linda Cook	Leech Woman	Puppet Master (1989)	Voice
Paul Le Mat	Alex Whitaker	Puppet Master (1989)	—N/a
Robin Frates	Megan Gallagher	Puppet Master (1989)	—N/a
Jimmie F. Skaggs	Neil Gallagher	Puppet Master (1989)	—N/a
Anthony Perkins	Norman Bates	Psycho (1960)	—N/a
Kane Hodder	Jason Voorhees	Jason Goes to Hell: The Final Friday (1993)	—N/a
Nick Castle/Tony Moran	Michael Myers	Halloween (1978)	—N/a
Jamie Lee Curtis	Laurie Strode	Halloween (1978)	—N/a
Donald Pleasence	Samuel Loomis	Halloween (1978)	—N/a

== Bonus features ==
Along with the Flix Facts feature (see below) and the Easter Egg, which included the hidden Jack Frost 2 clip, there were other bonus features. These were:

- Legends of the Boogeymen- biographies and histories for Pinhead, Freddy Krueger, Leatherface, Chucky, Candyman, Simon Cartwright, Wishmaster, The Tall Man, Jason Voorhees, Michael Myers, and Norman Bates
- Audio commentary by Robert Englund
- Name That Frame- trivia game featuring over 100 movie stills from Hellraiser, Child's Play 2, Candyman, Leprechaun, Halloween, Puppet Master, Phantasm, The Ugly, Wishmaster, The Guardian.
- Theatrical trailers for Hellraiser, The Texas Chainsaw Massacre, Child's Play 2, Candyman, Leprechaun, The Ugly, Wishmaster, The Guardian, The Dentist, Phantasm, Puppet Master, and Halloween.
- DVD-ROM Feature: Brain Crusher Trivia Game
- DVD-ROM Feature: Downloadable sound effects

== Critical reception ==
AllMovie gave the documentary a negative review, writing, "Boogeymen [...] [reduces] a mystifyingly broad range of films into the lowest common denominator of trading cards and role playing."

== Sequel ==
In 2002, FlixMix released a DVD entitled, Ultimate Fights. It featured the most intense fights ever to appear in the movies. There was supposed to be another FlixMix title that was never released, which was called Crack Me Up. It was planned to feature the funniest clips from the most recent blockbusters.
