= Chatterer =

- Hellraiser character
- Nicholas Vince as Chatterer in Hellraiser
- First appearance: The Hellbound Heart (1986)
- Last appearance: Hellraiser (2022)
- Created by: Clive Barker
- Portrayed by: Nicholas Vince (1987-1988); Jason Liles (2022); Chatterer III; Mike Jay Regan (2002-2005; 2018); Chatterer Beast; Jodie St. Michael (1996); Torso; Mike Jay Regan (2000); Female Chatterer; Jolene Andersen (2011)

In-universe information
- Full name: James (unknown middle or last name)
- Aliases: Chattering Cenobite; Female Cenobite; The Blind Sadist; The Angel of Suffering
- Species: Human/Cenobite
- Gender: Male
- Primary location: "The Labyrinth" / Hell
- Status: Deceased

Chatterer is a fictional character appearing in the Hellraiser franchise. He is a Cenobite, an order of extradimensional sadomasochists who experiment in extreme forms of hedonism. His name comes from the constant clicking of his teeth, his only means of communication. He serves the Cenobites' leader Pinhead. Chatterer has become a fan favourite character in the Hellraiser franchise.

== Character ==
Chatterer is a member of the Cenobites, formerly-human monsters dedicated to exploring the limits of human sensation; these "explorations" take the form of extreme sadomasochism, to the point that it is considered torture by most of those whom they encounter. He lives with his fellow Cenobites in an extradimensional realm called Hell, a gigantic labyrinth accessible only via a puzzle box called the Lament Configuration, which opens a dimensional fissure. While those who possess unique qualities conducive to the Cenobite agenda are transformed into Cenobites upon opening the box, others are subjected to the Cenobites' "experiments". Like his fellow Cenobites, Chatterer has lost all memory of his life as a human before he became a Cenobite; Hellraiser: Hellbound indicates that Chatterer opened the box while still a young boy. No further information for the character and his past is known. A short story written by actor Nicholas Vince, who played Chatterer in the first two Hellraiser films, offers an origin for the version of Chatterer who appears in "The Hellbound Heart". Vince's story, "Look See", claimed that the novella version of Chatterer was a handsome young actor who specialised in off-colour humour. A hugely successful, albeit corrupt, actor (who among other things slept with underage girls and framed rival actors and his enemies for being communists in order to ruin their careers), Chatterer eventually found the box and, sensing his dark heart, mutilated his face to match his inner self and as he was brought into the Order of the Gash.

Like his fellow Cenobites, Chatterer's body has been subjected to an extreme form of body modification and ritual scarification; in Chatterer's case, his face has been severely disfigured and his lips have been peeled back to permanently expose his teeth, which he can only click together as a means of communication. He is a member of the entourage of lead Cenobite Pinhead, accompanying him whenever he is summoned via the box and acting as the group's enforcer, physically attacking and restraining potential victims, often by shoving his hand in their mouths.

== Alternate versions ==
Due to the original version of the character's death by Dr. Phillip Channard at the end of Hellbound: Hellraiser II, as well as the character's absence from the sequel Hellraiser III: Hell on Earth, several alternate versions of the Chatterer character were devised to appear in the numerous sequels in the Hellraiser franchise.

=== Chatterer II ===
Chatterer II was intended to be a redesign of the original Chatterer character in Hellbound: Hellraiser II, with the updated version of the character allowing Nicholas Vince to be able to see through the makeup effects after an injury the actor sustained on set.

=== Chatterer III ===
Chatterer III first appeared in Hellraiser: Hellseeker portrayed by Mike Jay Regan. This version of the character also appears briefly in Hellraiser: Deader, and has a more prominent role in Hellraiser: Hellworld. He returns in Hellraiser: Judgment.

=== Female Chatterer ===
The Female Chatterer, otherwise known as Chatterer IV or Female Cenobite II, is an amalgam of Chatterer and the Female Cenobite that appears in Hellraiser: Revelations portrayed by Jolene Anderson.

=== Torso ===
Torso is a Cenobite in Chatterer's likeness that appears in Hellraiser: Inferno. Torso is portrayed by Chatterer III actor Mike Jay Regan, and, as his name suggests, has the lower half of his body missing. This Cenobite was reportedly created by the original Chatterer himself.

=== Chatterer Beast ===
The Chatterer Beast appears as Pinhead's pet in Hellraiser: Bloodline. The Chatterer Beast was moulded from human flesh by the Leviathan and designed to be Pinhead's pet in Chatterer's image.

== Appearances ==
=== Literature ===
Chatterer is first introduced in the novella The Hellbound Heart. Like the other Cenobites, he is identified only by the order in which he appeared to Frank Cotton, as "the third":

Now the third spoke. Its features were so heavily scarified – the wounds nurtured until they ballooned – that its eyes were invisible and its words corrupted by the disfigurement of its mouth.

Along with the other Cenobites, Chatterer takes antagonist Frank Cotton back to the Cenobite realm after Cotton opens the Lament Configuration, expecting to find a hedonistic paradise that will cure his nihilism. Despite being warned that what he finds may not be what he is expecting, Frank willingly goes along with the Cenobites, only to find that—past an initial euphoria—the experiences to which the Cenobites subject him are so intense as to be torturous. Chatterer is later part of the Cenobite contingent that makes a deal with Frank's niece, Kirsty, to return Frank to them in exchange for her own freedom, after she unwittingly makes a deal to return to the Cenobite realm by opening the box.

=== Film ===
Chatterer would reappear in the film adaptation of The Hellbound Heart, Hellraiser, in which he was given a name in the film's closing credits. Unlike in the novella, this Chatterer is completely mute, only capable of communicating by clicking his teeth together.

In Hellbound, Chatterer is renamed "Chatterer II" following aesthetic modifications to the mutilations on his face. After Kirsty Cotton reminds Pinhead of his own former humanity, the revelation causes his fellow Cenobites to remember their own former lives and they turn against the newly created Cenobite, Channard, to protect Kirsty. Chatterer, along with the rest of the Cenobites, are killed by Channard following a short fight; like the other Cenobites, Chatterer reverts to a non-mutilated human form after he dies – the form of a teenage boy.

Unlike other members of Pinhead's entourage from the first two Hellraiser films, Chatterer has made appearances in most of the later entries in the series. The mechanism of his revival was never explained in the films. He is a member of Pinhead's entourage in Hellraiser: Inferno (in which he lacks legs and is called "Torso"), Hellraiser: Hellseeker, Hellraiser: Deader, Hellraiser: Hellworld, and Hellraiser: Judgment while an alternative versions appear in Hellraiser: Bloodline, which featured "The Chatter Beast", and Hellraiser: Revelations, which featured the "Female Cenobite".

In the 2022 reboot, Hellraiser, the Chatterer appears with an updated appearance but is still mute and only communicates using its teeth. In the film, the Chatterer is stabbed with the Lament Configuration, seemingly killing the Chatterer after being ripped apart by chains.

=== Other appearances ===
==== Comics ====
Chatterer has appeared in Clive Barker's Hellraiser comic book series for BOOM! comics, where he is identified as Pinhead's page. Midway through the series, Pinhead betrays him (along with the rest of his fellow Cenobites) to Kirsty Cotton as part of a plan to retake his own former humanity. After "pleading" with Pinhead (in the form of clicking his teeth), Chatterer is torn apart by a series of hooked chains.

==== Novels ====
The Chatterer's origin was revealed in the 2017 short story "Prayers for Desire" written by Nicholas Vince and illustrated by Clive Barker, published by Seraphim Incorporated in the graphic novel Hellraiser Anthology Volume 2. Vince said on the matter: "I'm beyond excited to finally share a story I drafted in December 2012. It's worth the wait, as it's found its spiritual home beside wonderful illustrations by Clive and amongst superb storytellers".

==== Video Games ====
In September 2021, Chatterer became a playable character as a purchasable cosmetic in the online multiplayer horror game Dead by Daylight. Due to licensing issues, all Hellraiser content was removed on April 4, 2025. Chatterer and Pinhead remained available only to players who purchased them before this date.

Chatterer appears in the first-person survival horror game Clive Barker's Hellraiser: Revival.

=== Fictional character biography ===
As a pre-teenage boy, Jim frames his mother for the murder of his abusive father and is sent to an orphanage, where he and the other adolescents are taught that they will be useless to society. There, he engages in a homosexual relationship with a boy named Seth and regularly prays to the God of Love for affection. After turning sixteen, Jim joins Seth in becoming a prostitute, in which his physical appearance would often be complimented by his clients, to his disgust. One day, one of the clients asks him what his deepest desire is, to which he replied "To be loved". Later, he is asked again by the client what his desire is, this time replying "To be ugly", believing that people would love him for who he is. The client hands him a Lament Configuration, and he begins to serve who he is told is the God of Pain and Desire by distributing the Lament Configurations to various people. Years later, he comes across a blinded Seth, who was punished by their former pimp for Jim's decision to leave. Jim is told by another one of Hell's servants to make him solve a Configuration. Instead, Jim and Seth engage in sexual intercourse and Seth begins to angrily confess how much he hates Jim during the act. That night, Seth leaves without opening the Configuration and Jim's desire is granted as he is forcibly disfigured by the jealous God of Pain and Pleasure. The story ends with him becoming a Summoning Angel with clicking teeth.

== Character design and portrayal ==
=== Design ===
Actor Nicholas Vince lived near creator Clive Barker, who liked his work. Barker suggested they work together, resulting in a collaboration on Hellraiser. As Chatterer, Vince wore a one-piece mask that rendered him blind. A fake set of chattering teeth were fitted in his mouth and were triggered when he bit down. Because of the difficulty in eating and the drooling associated with the design, the chattering teeth were redesigned to be removable. The design was changed in Hellbound because Vince suffered an injury to his jaw while filming a scene where Chatterer was to be impaled with several hooks. Due to this injury, Vince requested that Chatterer be given eyes to help with his vision.

=== Portrayal ===
Chatterer was played by Nicholas Vince in Hellraiser and Hellbound: Hellraiser II. The role of the Chatter Beast in Hellraiser: Bloodline was played by Jodie St. Michael. Torso from Hellraiser: Inferno, and the Chatterer in Hellraiser: Hellseeker, Hellraiser: Deader, Hellraiser: Hellworld and Hellraiser: Judgment were all performed by Mike Jay Regan. The female Chatterer that appeared in Hellraiser: Revelations was portrayed by Jolene Andersen. The Chatterer is played by Jason Liles in the 2022 reboot.

== Reception ==
Shock Till You Drop called Chatterer an iconic character that is "simply a badass and incredibly terrifying". Paul Kane describes the character as representing two different fears: that of being eaten alive and dental work. In his review of the original Hellraiser film, Chris Stuckmann stated when talking about how little screentime Pinhead actually has in the film: "In fact I was more scared by The Chatterer, who must have inspired the creative team behind Silent Hill. But that's kind of how it goes with these horror movie icons isn't it? I mean when you think of Jason, and then go back and watch the first Friday the 13th, the Jason that we know, just really isn't there. Save for Michael Myers in the first Halloween film, a lot of times these horror movie villains become culturally impactful because we (the audience) decide they are". The character has received their own Funko Pop Vinyl figure. Ironically, the figure claims to be from Hellraiser III: Hell on Earth, which is one of the few films in the Hellraiser franchise in which Chatterer (or any version of Chatterer) does not actually appear.
