= Rhian Morgan =

Rhian Morgan may refer to:

- Rhian Morgan (actress) in August (1996 film)
- Rhian Morgan (singer) with The Morgan Twins
