= Oliver Smith (actor) =

English actor (born 1952)

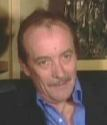
- An interview with Smith on Hellraiser: Resurrection featurette in 2000
- Born: 29 May 1952 (age 72)
- Occupation: Actor
- Known for: Hellraiser
- Spouse: Sarah Peace

Oliver Smith (born 29 May 1952) is an English actor. He is known for playing the role of Frank the Monster from the original Hellraiser film in 1987, as well as Mr. Browning and Skinless Frank from Hellbound: Hellraiser II in 1988. In May–June 2010, Smith narrated the commercial for the DVD and Blu-ray releases of Life.

== As Frank the Monster ==
Oliver Smith's role in the original Hellraiser film is as Frank (the main villain in Hellraiser) after he is slain by Pinhead. Actor Sean Chapman plays Frank in his living state in the early stages of the film.

== Filmography ==
- Jesus of Nazareth (1977), Saul
- The First Great Train Robbery (1979), Ratting Assistant
- Porridge (1979), McMillan
- Riding High (1981), Burt Ganja
- Hellraiser (1987), Zombified Frank / Frank the Monster
- Hellbound: Hellraiser II (1988), Browning / Skinless Frank
- Tale of a Vampire (1992), Bum

== Television/Commercial ==
- Life (2010) – Male Narration (commercialised) (uncredited)
