= Christopher Figg =

British film producer

Christopher Figg (born 24 May 1957) is a film producer from the town of Aylesbury in Buckinghamshire, England. His film credits include Heidi, The Adventures of Greyfriars Bobby, Dog Soldiers and the first three films from the Hellraiser series: Hellraiser, Hellbound: Hellraiser II, and Hellraiser III: Hell on Earth. He was recently executive producer on Noel Clarke's 4.3.2.1 and on the film Coriolanus with Ralph Fiennes and Gerard Butler. He was also executive producer of We Need to Talk About Kevin.
