= Robin Vidgeon =

English cinematographer (born 1939)

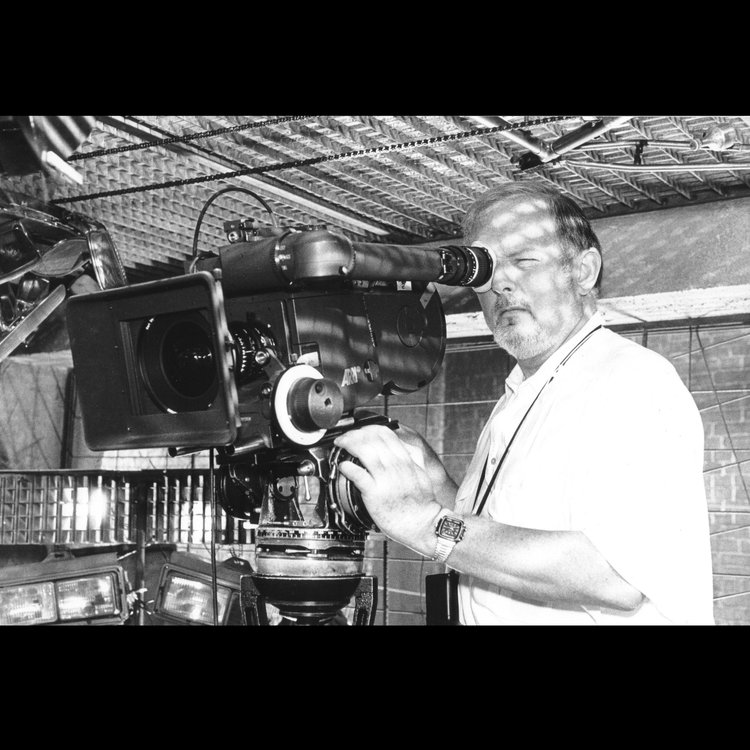
- Born: 12 August 1939 (age 87); London, England
- Occupation: Cinematographer
- Partners: Angela Dawson
- Writing career
- Notable awards: John Alcott Memorial Reward (1999)

Robin Vidgeon (born 12 August 1939) BSC, is an English retired cinematographer best known for his work on Hellraiser, Hellbound: Hellraiser II and Nightbreed. For many years, he was a focus puller, working with the late cinematographer Douglas Slocombe and camera operator Bernard (Chic) Waterson.

== Early life ==
As a child, Robin took an early interest in film, creating his own dark room and using a 9.5mm projector to screen movies for his neighbors. In 1956, he would go to work at Pinewood Studios cleaning equipment boxes. In 1959, he left Pinewood and applied for various jobs in the industry before he was eventually hired by Douglas Slocombe to work as a focus puller on Circus of Horrors.

== Work with Slocombe ==
For the next twenty five years, Robin would work with Slocombe on numerous films such as Rollerball, The Great Gatsby and Close Encounters of the Third Kind, to name just a few. After completing production on the Indiana Jones and the Last Crusade, Robin would part with Slocombe and go on to work as a cinematographer.

== Director of photography ==
Following his work with Slocombe, Robin began working as a cinematographer on films such as The Mission, The Penitent before going to work with Clive Barker on his directorial debut, Hellraiser. Robin would also go on to film Hellbound: Hellraiser II and Nightbreed with Barker.

Throughout the 1980s and 90's, Robin would continue to work as a cinematographer, citing his work on Anthony Hopkins' directorial debut, August, as one of his most memorable experiences.

During 1994–1995, Robin was the acting president of British Society of Cinematographers, and has been an honorary member since that time.

== Retirement ==
Since his retirement in 2013, Robin has worked as a cinematography tutor at the London Film Academy. He has also taught Film & Digital Cinematography at the Met Film School, and given masterclasses at the University of Greenwich.

In March 2022, Robin was a guest on The Ghost Of Hollywood, where he would discuss his career in depth, including his work with Slocombe, Waterson, Hopkins and Barker.
