= Clive Barker's Hellraiser: Revival =

- Developer: Saber Interactive
- Publisher: Saber Interactive
- Director: Emil Esov
- Artist: Petra Nikolić
- Writer: Antony De Fault
- Composer: Milos Nikolic
- Series: Hellraiser
- Engine: Unreal Engine 5
- Platforms: Nintendo Switch 2; PlayStation 5; Windows; Xbox Series X/S
- Release: 8 October 2026
- Genres: Action, survival horror
- Mode: Single-player

Clive Barker's Hellraiser: Revival is a 2026 survival horror action game developed and published by Saber Interactive. Based on the Hellraiser franchise, it was written in collaboration with the franchise's creator, Clive Barker. The game was released for Nintendo Switch 2, PlayStation 5, Windows, and Xbox Series X/S in October 2026. It received positive reviews from critics.

== Gameplay ==
Clive Barker's Hellraiser: Revival is a single-player survival horror and action game. The player controls Aidan Lynch from a first-person perspective, and must defend against hostile humans and demonic Cenobites using both combat and stealth. Additionally, players can solve puzzles and gather resources to craft items, such as healing equipment and ammunition. In combat, the player can use melee weapons and firearms. Blunt weapons, such as clubs and baseball bats, break through armor, while sharp weapons, such as knives and machetes, are effective against unprotected enemies; all melee weapons break after a certain number of uses. A puzzle box called the Genesis Configuration can also be used as a weapon and provides the player with additional abilities, including telekinesis. Some enemies cannot be defeated in combat and require the player to sneak or flee to survive.

== Synopsis ==
=== Setting and characters ===
Hellraiser: Revival is set in the universe of the Hellraiser franchise, taking place twenty years after the events of the original film, Hellraiser (1987). Primarily set on Earth, the game also explores the Labyrinth, an otherworldly realm of shifting corridors inhabited by the Cenobites and ruled by their god, Leviathan. The Cenobites are humans transformed into demonic beings who worship sensation through extreme pain and pleasure. The Cenobites are divided into different orders, called a Gash. Hellraiser: Revival depicts a Gash led by the Hell Priest, also known as Pinhead (voiced by Doug Bradley), and includes The Child (also known as Chatterer), The Cabalist (also known as Butterball), and the Fallen (Hannah van der Westhuysen), the female Cenobite (also known as Deep Throat).

Players control Aidan Lynch (Xalavier Nelson Jr.), a medical-school dropout and member of the Hellraisers biker gang. He and his girlfriend Yoon "Sunny" Sun-Hee (Leader Looi) come from affluent families and share a pursuit of extreme experiences through sex and substance abuse. Sunny also collects occult artefacts, including the Genesis Configuration, a supernatural puzzle box linked to the Labyrinth. After Sunny is taken by the Cenobites, Aidan pursues her into the Labyrinth, forcing him to confront his own troubled past and the nature of their relationship. He is aided by Zora Beckett (Mia Soteriou), a merchant who provides resources and support.

Aidan's journey brings him into conflict with the Scarlet Church, a human cult that worships Leviathan and the Cenobites and seeks to ascend into their service. The church is led by Colin Marlowe (David Menkin), alongside the artist-prophet Bruno Keller (Joseph May). It operates beneath a BDSM club, using patrons as sacrifices in its attempts to bring Leviathan to Earth and create Cenobites, using the Genesis Configuration and Bruno's significant surgical alterations of the cult members. The Sister of Mercy (Iz Hesketh) is a former dominatrix transformed into a multi-armed creature who remains devoted to Marlowe. Charlotte Strauss (Rhiannon Moushall) voluntarily submits to the church's experiments and becomes a monster that stalks Aidan. Aidan also encounters the Unworthy, humans rejected by Leviathan and transformed into emaciated, elongated creatures.

=== Plot ===
Aidan and his girlfriend Sunny have sadomasochistic sex involving the Genesis Configuration, a puzzle box given to Sunny. Responding to their desire and pain, the box summons the Cenobites: the Child, the Cabalist, the Fallen, and their leader, the Hell Priest. The Priest uses hooked chains to tear Sunny apart and knock Aidan unconscious.

Aidan awakens as a captive of the Scarlet Church, a cult that pursues extreme sensations of pain and pleasure and worships the Cenobites as divine angels. Led by Marlowe, the cult seeks to activate the box for the Rite of Rebirth, which its members believe will transform them into Cenobites. Marlowe demands Aidan's help to activate the box, but Aidan escapes and fights through the church's sprawling complex of torture chambers and a sex club. As he approaches Marlowe and the box, he hears Sunny calling to him, telling him she survived and asking him to find her. Disguised as a cult member, Aidan watches the cult's prophet, Bruno, implant the box in the chest of Charlotte, a cultist. The Cenobites briefly appear, and Charlotte transforms into a grotesque monster. In the ensuing panic, Aidan reclaims the box, kills Bruno, and escapes.

Outside the facility, Aidan encounters Zora, a half-human and half-Cenobite—known as an Eremite—who offers him advice. Aidan activates the box and summons the Priest, who agrees to help him rescue Sunny in exchange for his flesh when the time comes, before branding Aidan with the box. The Priest leads him into the Labyrinth and to the Field of Souls, where Aidan finds a stone pillar associated with Sunny and uses the box to liquefy it into blood.

He returns home and finds Sunny as a living skeleton in immense pain. The Priest tells him that she must feed on others branded by the box, those with desolate voids and vigorous desires, to be fully restored. Aidan seeks out Charlotte, but the Fallen confronts him along the way, telling him that Leviathan sees the emptiness of his soul and that he desires the same extreme sensations as the Cenobites. Aidan kills Charlotte and takes her heart. His return journey through the Labyrinth reveals his past substance addictions, and that his seemingly idyllic relationship with Sunny was actually volatile and abusive. He feeds Sunny Charlotte's heart, partially restoring her body.

Aidan next seeks Marlowe at his club, where Zora suggests that he is confusing needing Sunny with loving her, and that she fills the same void as his previous addictions. Aidan kills the Sister of Mercy, one of Marlowe's failed Rebirth creations, and feeds her heart to Sunny, further restoring her body and revealing that she is pregnant.

The Labyrinth transports Aidan back to the church's facility, where Bruno—resurrected in the same way as Sunny—takes the box and flees. Aidan pursues him into the lower levels, where a desperate Marlowe demands that Bruno perform the Rite of Rebirth on him, believing himself destined to become a god. Bruno presses the box into Marlowe's chest, summoning the Cenobites. The Priest tells Marlowe that he was never destined for ascension. Marlowe is transformed into a hulking monster and flees to the church's cathedral. Aidan confronts Bruno, who abandons Marlowe's cause and declines to fight. Recovering the box, Aidan pursues Marlowe to the cathedral and kills him.

Aidan feeds Sunny Marlowe's heart, fully restoring her human form. The Cenobites arrive, and the Priest demands that Aidan fulfil his bargain. Aidan allows Sunny to consume his hand. The Priest reveals that the church misinterpreted the Rite of Rebirth, and the Genesis Configuration actually identifies a Revenant Mother: someone with a womb, sufficient will, and an unquenchable void within them. As Sunny begins to give birth, the Priest kneels over her and dissolves. Aidan tries to intervene, but the Child throws him into the Labyrinth. By the time he returns, Sunny has given birth to an ascended incarnation of the Priest, capable of experiencing greater sensations and wielding Leviathan's powers of revelation.

Sunny reveals that she agreed from the outset to give birth to the Priest in exchange for joining the Cenobites and receiving the fulfilment they offer, and manipulated Aidan to resurrect her. Aidan angrily accuses her of using him, but she replies that they used each other. Sunny and the Cenobites, except the Fallen, open Leviathan's body and enter the Void within—a deeper realm where they can explore the apotheosis of sensation. The Fallen offers Aidan the choice to join them, while Zora encourages him to choose his own destiny and believe he can change. If Aidan accepts the Fallen's offer, they enter the Void, and Aidan becomes a Cenobite. If he refuses, Aidan is optimistic about building a new life.

== Development ==
Clive Barker's Hellraiser: Revival is developed by Saber Interactive using Unreal Engine 5, with Emil Esov serving as the game director. It is the first video game in the Hellraiser franchise and the second to feature Pinhead, following the character's inclusion as downloadable content for the asymmetric multiplayer game Dead by Daylight before its removal in April 2025. The game was predominantly inspired by the "atmosphere, themes, and mythos" of the original film, Hellraiser (1987), and its first sequel Hellbound: Hellraiser II (1988).

Franchise creator Clive Barker was consulted on the game's story from the beginning of development, while Doug Bradley, who portrayed Pinhead in the first eight Hellraiser films and voiced the character in Dead by Daylight, reprised his role. Other key development staff include art director Petra Nikolić and narrative director Anthony De Fault.

== Release ==
Saber Interactive first teased Clive Barker's Hellraiser: Revival on 17 July 2025, before officially announcing it on July 22. In August 2025, a 45-minute demo of the game was featured at Gamescom. The game was released for Nintendo Switch 2, PlayStation 5, Windows, and Xbox Series X/S on 8 October 2026. Boss Team Games created three collector's edition releases for the game, which will include collectibles such as a re-creation of the Genesis Configuration puzzle box, a statue, an art book, a SteelBook case, and an art print signed by Barker.

== Reception ==
Reception

Aggregate scores
Aggregator	Score
Metacritic	(NS2) 75/100 (PC) 76/100 (PS5) 69/100 (XSXS) 71/100
OpenCritic	62% recommend

Review scores
Publication	Score
Eurogamer	3/5
Game Informer	4.5/10
GameSpot	8/10
GamesRadar+	4/5
Giant Bomb	4/5
Hardcore Gamer	3.5/5
IGN	6/10
PCGamesN	9/10
Push Square	5/10

Clive Barker's Hellraiser: Revival received "generally favorable" reviews for the Nintendo Switch 2 and Windows version while the PlayStation 5 and Xbox Series X/S versions received "mixed or average" reviews from critics, according to review aggregator Metacritic. OpenCritic determined that 61% of critics recommended the game.
