= Nightbreed =

1990 film by Clive Barker

- Theatrical release poster
- Directed by: Clive Barker
- Written by: Clive Barker
- Based on: Cabal by Clive Barker
- Produced by: Gabriella Martinelli
- Starring: Craig Sheffer; Anne Bobby; David Cronenberg; Charles Haid
- Cinematography: Robin Vidgeon
- Edited by: Mark Goldblatt; Richard Marden
- Music by: Danny Elfman
- Production company: Morgan Creek Productions
- Distributed by: 20th Century Fox (United States); J&M Entertainment (Overseas)
- Release date: February 16, 1990
- Running time: 102 minutes
- Country: United States
- Language: English
- Budget: $11 million
- Box office: $16 million

Nightbreed is a 1990 American dark fantasy film written and directed by Clive Barker, based on his 1988 novella Cabal. It stars Craig Sheffer, Anne Bobby, David Cronenberg, Charles Haid, Hugh Quarshie, and Doug Bradley. The film follows an unstable mental patient named Aaron Boone who is falsely led to believe by his doctor that he is a serial killer. Tracked down by the police, his doctor, and his girlfriend Lori, Boone eventually finds refuge in an abandoned cemetery called Midian among a tribe of monsters and outcasts known as the "Nightbreed" who hide from humanity.

At the time of its release, the film was a commercial and critical failure. In several interviews, Barker protested that the film company tried to sell it as a standard slasher film, and that the powers-that-be had no real working knowledge of Nightbreed's story. Since its initial theatrical release, Nightbreed has become a cult film.

Over time, Barker expressed disappointment with the final cut approved by the studio and always longed for the recovery of the reels so the film might be re-edited. In 2014, original film elements for the cut material were re-obtained and were edited into a director's cut, released through Scream Factory.

== Plot ==
Aaron Boone has recurring nightmares of a place called Midian. His girlfriend Lori Winston encourages him to resume psychotherapy with Dr. Phillip Decker. Meanwhile, a serial killer has been massacring entire families. When Boone returns to Decker's office, he is horrified to learn that his dreams mirror these ritualistic killings. Decker tells Boone to turn himself in and start taking lithium, but he actually gives Boone LSD.

Boone is hospitalized during the resulting trip. Another patient is ranting about Midian and explains where it is. When the patient peels his face off, Boone escapes from the hospital during the commotion and heads to Midian. All he finds there is a graveyard where he falls asleep. At night, he is confronted by monstrous beings who argue over whether he belongs there. Boone claims he is a murderer, but they know he is not. One of them tries to eat Boone, but he escapes.

Outside the graveyard, Boone is confronted by the police who have been led there by Dr. Decker. He tricks the police into shooting Boone. In the morgue, Boone is revived by the bite he received in the graveyard. He returns to Midian and learns about the Nightbreed who live there. He is inducted into their society through the blood of their deity Baphomet.

Lori follows Boone's path to Midian. She is followed there by Decker who is the serial killer. He framed Boone for the murders in an attempt to locate the Nightbreed. He tries to lure Boone out of Midian by using Lori, but Boone rescues her. The Nightbreed explain that they are just creatures from folklore who used to live in peace until humans tried to extinguish them. They banish Lori and Boone from Midian.

They check into a motel but find that Decker has been there and slaughtered people in the room next door. Boone is arrested for Decker's murders, and the doctor convinces the police to storm Midian. His ultimate goal is to destroy the Nightbreed.

While the police head to Midian, several Nightbreed break Boone out of jail and enlist his help. A chaotic battle ensues between the Nightbreed and the police. Decker confronts Boone and is killed. Boone seeks out Baphomet, and he explains that Boone has caused the end of Midian, which had been foretold. Baphomet charges Boone with finding a new home for the Nightbreed and renames him Cabal.

Determined to stay with Boone, Lori commits suicide and Boone resurrects her with a bite. He promises the Nightbreed that he will follow Baphomet's orders.

In the ruins of Midian, Ashberry stands in front of Decker's corpse and states that he wants vengeance on Baphomet and the Breed. When he presses Baphomet's blood to Decker's wound, Decker springs back to life with a scream as Ashberry repeatedly shouts "Hallelujah!"

=== Alternative endings ===
==== The Cabal Cut ====
In The Cabal Cut, the resurrection of Decker plays as a post-credits scene.

==== Director's Cut ====
In the alternative ending used in The Cabal Cut and Director's Cut of the film, Narcisse is killed earlier in the battle by Decker, so he is not present during the subsequent events. The Nightbreed await Boone in a barn whilst Boone says his goodbyes to Lori, as he must find a new home for the Nightbreed. Boone promises to return to her, but knowing that Boone will retain his youth and immortality as she grows old, Lori suddenly stabs herself, forcing Boone to resurrect her as a Nightbreed. They profess their love for one another and begin their journey.

Meanwhile, Captain Eigerman wanders the underground remains of the cemetery where he stumbles upon the transformed Ashberry, who longs for revenge after his burning by Baphomet. Eigerman shares this desire, but Ashberry rejects Eigerman's offer, kills him, and starts his hunt for the Nightbreed.

The surviving Nightbreed watch Boone and Lori in the distance. Rachel tells Babette that Boone will return soon, perhaps the next day, to lead them to a new haven. Boone and Lori now appear together as part of a prophecy in a Nightbreed painting.

== Cast ==
- Craig Sheffer as Aaron Boone
- Anne Bobby as Lori Winston, Aaron's girlfriend.
- David Cronenberg as Dr. Philip K. Decker / Curtis, a psychotherapist who doubles as a masked serial killer.
- Charles Haid as Captain Eigerman, a police captain that allies with Decker.
- Hugh Quarshie as Detective Joyce
- Bradley Lavelle as Cormack
- Hugh Ross as Narcisse, a Nightbreed with a removable face.
- Doug Bradley as Dirk Lylesberg, a Nightbreed who serves as their acolyte and lawgiver.
- Catherine Chevalier as Rachel, a shapeshifting Nightbreed who cannot deal with sunlight.
- Bob Sessions as Pettine
- Malcolm Smith as Father Ashberry, a drunken priest who allies with Decker.
- Oliver Parker as Peloquin, a Nightbreed that is responsible for biting Aaron.
- Debora Weston as Sheryl Ann, a woman that Lori befriends.
- Nicholas Vince as Kinski, a Nightbreed with a crescent moon-shaped head.
- Simon Bamford as Ohnaka, a tattooed member of the Nightbreed.
- Kim Robertson and Nina Robertson as Babette, the Nightbreed daughter of Rachel who has the same traits as her.
- Christine McCorkindale as Shuna Sassi, a Nightbreed with an animalistic face who is covered in quills.
- Tony Bluto as Leroy Gomm, an overweight Nightbreed who has retractable tentacles coming out of his stomach.
- Bernard Henry as Baphomet, a demon who is the deity of the Nightbreed

== Themes and interpretations ==
Writer-director Clive Barker, himself a gay man, makes his Nightbreed spectacularly queer, chiefly through its visual design and dishy repartee: the monsters sport leather, tattoos, body-piercings, shaved heads and/or pony-tails, Doc Marten boots, vests upon bare chests, and van dykes ("Satan beards" or "queer beards"), a look that was concurrently being made fashionable by Queer Nationalists, members of Act Up, and the visual stylizations of queer theatre pieces such as Reza Abdoh's Bogeyman.
— Monsters in the Closet: Homosexuality and the Horror Film (Inside Popular Film) by Harry M. Benshoff, 1997.

Nightbreed has been characterized as containing themes related to queerness and the LGBT community. In 1997, author Harry M. Benshoff called it, "One of the first horror films to make an explicit connection between monsters and the activist politics of the queer community".

Filmmaker Alejandro Jodorowsky called Nightbreed "the first truly gay horror fantasy epic", explaining how the unconsummated relationship between doctor and patient is in his view the central theme. In 2015, Tyler Coates of Decider called Jodorowsky's interpretation of the characters' relationship as being "only the tip of the iceberg and, I'd argue, a red herring"; Coates focuses instead on the presence of queer subtext "blatantly seen in the Nightbreed's culture", writing that, "Because normalcy is subjective and based solely on how the majority defines it, it's important to establish mini-societies and cultures with people like you."

In 2019, Trace Thurman of Bloody Disgusting wrote that the Nightbreed as depicted in the film "represent queerness, or any fill-in-the-blank 'Other' you can think of." Noting that, beyond writer-director Clive Barker being "one of the most famous queer horror artists of our time [...] The narrative itself is filled to the brim with queerness and serves as an allegory for intolerance. Can anyone watch Nightbreed and not automatically associate the titular creatures with queer people? They've been outcast by society and are deemed as dangerous by the 'normal' people. The climax of the film culminates in an assault on the Nightbreed's home base of Midian as the 'normies' would rather kill all of them as opposed to understand them." That same year, Leigh Monson of Birth. Movies. Death. wrote that the director's cut of the film "places on display the full scope of a narrative that is a broad and potent allegory for the persecution of the queer community."

In 2021, The A.V. Club's Charles Bramesco also examined the presence of queer themes in the film's director's cut, writing that some of its homoerotic subtext was initially removed when executives at 20th Century Fox demanded that the film be trimmed during its post-production. Bramesco argued, "They were blind to the subtext of this community as a home for misfits, where the placeless Boone—who doesn't seem all that interested in sex with his torch-singing girlfriend—can find an accepting family. The director's cut allows us more time with the creatures and ups their number, emphasizing that they're only fearsome to those afraid of difference."

== Production ==
=== Development ===
Barker always loved monsters and felt that "there's a corner of all of us that envies their powers and would love to live forever, or to fly, or to change shape at will. So, when I came to make a movie about monsters, I wanted to create a world we'd feel strangely at home in". He was interested in creating a "horror mythology from the ground up" and developing characters that would live on in sequels. As he finished writing the novella Cabal, he realized that it would make a good film that he would direct himself. He originally envisioned a trilogy of films. Mark Frost wrote the initial draft of the screenplay for Barker.

Nightbreed was the first of a planned three-picture deal Barker had with Morgan Creek, Joe Roth's production company, that included an adaptation of Son of Celluloid and a sequel to Nightbreed. The first compromise Barker made was to change the title of the film from Cabal to Nightbreed because Morgan Creek insisted on a more commercial title and thought that the original one did not mean anything. He was given a budget of $11 million, which was a considerable increase from the $2 million he had to work with on Hellraiser. His goal was to make the Star Wars of horror films. The monsters in the book are represented impressionistically over two or three paragraphs and the challenge Barker faced was to visualize them in much greater detail for the film.

Originally several of the creatures were supposed to be stop motion puppets, in addition to pixilation for the Boone and Peloquin transformation scenes, but make-up gradually replaced the puppets, and barely any of the stop motion made it till the finished movie. Animator Rory Fellowes said "The fact is we were too late for stopmotion and too early for CG".

=== Filming ===
For the film, Barker used three soundstages at Pinewood Studios shooting some scenes on location at Wexham Park Hospital, Slough, Berkshire, UK over several nights and in Calgary, Alberta, Canada. Bob Keen and his crew had two months to play around with ideas before doing any modeling work. They used computer-controlled animatronics but only where necessary. Towards the end of principal photography, Barker brought Star Wars concept artist Ralph McQuarrie in to paint mattes for the Necropolis sequences and design the history of the Breed in a symbolic way on an enormous mural across a 60-foot space on the set at Pinewood to be used in the opening credits.

During an interview in 2022 on The Ghost of Hollywood, cinematographer Robin Vidgeon mentioned that he disliked working with David Cronenberg, stating Cronenberg complained to Clive that he was being usurped.

Barker was contractually obligated to deliver an R-rated film and could not make it as gory as his previous picture Hellraiser. Barker previewed the first cut of Nightbreed with a temporary soundtrack that did not go well, as people were confused by the characters' motives. He made some changes and the second test screening was much more successful. However, the ending with Decker's death was not well received and Barker changed it. In late July 1989, the studio pushed the release date for Nightbreed from its original autumn 1989 date to early February 1990 instead. The press release cited "the complex demands of the film's ground-breaking post-production optical effects", but this also included McQuarrie's mural and matte paintings, and a week of additional shooting in late August that would see key parts of the narrative re-shot. Barker shot extra scenes over three days in Los Angeles in late 1989 which included additional scenes with David Cronenberg which expanded and clarified his character. Barker's original version ran two-and-a-half hours and Fox asked for almost an hour to be cut prompting editor Richard Marden to leave the project in protest. Nightbreed was cut to two hours and then again to 102 minutes.

== Soundtrack ==
Nightbreed (Original Motion Picture Soundtrack)

Film score by Danny Elfman
- Released: March 20, 1990
- Recorded: 1990
- Genre: Soundtrack
- Length: 46:46
- Label: MCA
- Producers: Danny Elfman and Steve Bartek

Danny Elfman chronology
Batman (1989)	Nightbreed (Original Motion Picture Soundtrack) (1990)	Dick Tracy (1990)

Professional ratings
Review scores
Source	Rating
Allmusic	4.5/5 stars
SoundtrackNet	4.5/5 stars
Filmtracks	3/5 stars
Musicfromthemovies	(favorable)

The score was composed by Danny Elfman and conducted by Shirley Walker, who also wrote the additional cue "Charge of the Berserkers" for the film's climax and received an onscreen credit. Elfman said of his score: "Once again it was time for me to stretch out... Combining dark/fun/sweet/tribal all into one. The great joy in the score for me, other than working for Clive Barker, was being able to use the children's voices and a whole slew of ethnic drums and instruments together with an orchestra, in an attempt to bring a unique musical tone to the film". Barker said "Danny is an extraordinary talent. The most uncompromised portion of that entire movie is the score".

In an article on Elfman, described as a rising composer in Hollywood who had just scored Tim Burton's Batman and was about to score Warren Beatty's Dick Tracy, Entertainment Weekly's Ron Givens noted that Nightbreed wouldn't get as much attention as these two big-budget movies, yet Givens praised Elfman's "needle-sharp crescendos and creepy choral plainchants" and added: "Seldom has scary-movie music been so spiritual".

The song "Country Skin" is a country-and-western rendition of the Oingo Boingo song "Skin" (which appears on the 1990 album Dark at the End of the Tunnel), it was written by Elfman and performed by country singer Michael Stanton. It can be heard in the film, played on a radio. It was available as a bonus track on the CD and cassette version of the soundtrack.

== Release ==
=== Marketing ===
According to Barker, the studio did not promote it well with posters that misinterpreted the content. When he saw the way they were selling Nightbreed, he freaked out and said: "What you doing? This isn't the movie, and was given all kinds of excuses ... Well, there isn't time to change it, we have to release it now". The head of marketing at Morgan Creek never watched all the way through because it "disgusted and distressed" him, according to Barker. The studio did not understand it, it had no movie stars, it was violent, and it had elements of fantasy and horror which they saw as a weakness while Barker saw it as a strength. They ended up marketing Nightbreed as a slasher film with television teasers that were confusing and did not represent it. The trailer was sent to the MPAA and it was rejected 12 times. They forbade any monster footage, and it was cut down to someone being terrorized with a razor, which constituted only five minutes of Barker's film. Looking back, Barker realized that Fox was better at promoting films like White Men Can't Jump but "not so good at selling the quirky stuff".

The studio argued that there was no point showing Nightbreed to critics because the people who see horror films do not read reviews. Therefore, the film had to be sold to the lowest common denominator. They refused to preview the film for critics, a decision which angered Barker.

== Reception ==
=== Box office ===
Nightbreed was released on February 16, 1990, in 1,488 theaters, grossing $3.7 million on its opening weekend. It went on to make $8.8 million in the United States and Canada and $7 million internationally for a worldwide total of $16 million on an $11 million budget.

=== Critical response ===
Rotten Tomatoes, a review aggregator, reports 57% of 35 surveyed critics gave the film a positive review; the average rating was 5.7 out of 10. The site's consensus states: "Nightbreed's imaginative world-building and startling creature designs are no match for its clumsy, uneven plotting". Metacritic, which uses a weighted average, assigned the film a score of 40 out of 100, based on 14 critics, indicating "mixed or average" reviews. In his review for the Toronto Star, Henry Mietkiewicz wrote "Nightbreed might have been a monster movie milestone, if Clive Barker's directorial abilities had kept pace with his skill as a master of British horror fiction. Unfortunately, Nightbreed probably will be remembered as much for its haphazard plotting and underdeveloped characters as its delightfully daring concept". Derek Malcolm wrote in his review for The Guardian that "it is neither direct nor subtle enough as a piece of film-making. It is difficult to suggest that evil is human and monsters have souls within the context of a mountain of special effects. The result is patchy in the extreme and not always capable of transcending a genre that has become less and less intriguing as less and less is left to the imagination".

However, Entertainment Weekly's Ty Burr gave the film a "B" rating, writing: "From the film's Gothic sets, fantastic makeup, and nightmarish plot line, it's clear that Barker owes as much to Poe and Lovecraft as to classic Hollywood screamers like Island of Lost Souls. But Barker's most perverse touch is that he makes these creatures the good guys (no wonder the PR flacks were bamboozled). Despite their grotesque appearance, they're a more colorful and engaging bunch than the emissaries of the normal world. Barker piles on more subversive subtext than his story can bear — it's a monster movie, after all — but his daft, Grand Guignol vision has real power. The quality that freaked out the studio, Barker's ambition, is precisely what makes Nightbreed so impressive".

== Accolades ==
Award	Category	Recipients and nominees	Outcome
Saturn Awards	Best Horror Film	Nightbreed	Nominated
Saturn Awards	Best Director	Clive Barker	Nominated
Saturn Awards	Best Make-Up	Bob Keen, Geoffrey Portass	Nominated
Saturn Awards	Best DVD/BD Special Edition Release	Nightbreed: The Director's Cut - Mark Alan Miller	Won
Amsterdam Fantastic Film Festival	Silver Scream Award	Clive Barker	Won
Avoriaz Fantastic Film Festival	Special Jury Award	Clive Barker	Won
Fantasporto	Critics Award	Clive Barker	Won
Fantasporto	International Fantasy Film Award	Best Film – Clive Barker	Nominated

== Merchandise ==
=== Comic books ===
In 1990, to tie in with the film's box office release, Epic Comics produced a four-issue adaptation of the film, which included significant differences from the finished movie, more closely related to Clive Barker's original script. The comic book continued to run past the end of the film, ultimately stretching to twenty-five issues before it was cancelled. The comic book was initially written by Alan Grant and John Wagner and drawn by Jim Baikie.

A two-part graphic novel was also produced, Hellraiser vs Nightbreed: Jihad, which merges the two worlds created by Clive Barker and features the Cenobites as agents of order against their chaotic nemesis the Nightbreed, and the Jihad (Holy War) of extermination that the first wage on the latter.

Nightbreed returned in 1992, as a short story in the second issue of the four issue Epic anthology series.

A 12 issue mini-series was published by BOOM! Studios in 2014-2015 following the storyline of the Director's Cut of the film. It was collected in three volumes.

=== Video games ===
Two video games based on the film were released shortly after the movie. The games were intended to form a trilogy but due to the poor performance of the first two the third was never made. Nightbreed, The Action Game was released for the Amiga, Atari ST, Commodore 64, ZX Spectrum, Amstrad CPC, and MS-DOS. Clive Barker's Nightbreed: The Interactive Movie was released for the Amiga, Atari ST, and MS-DOS.

== Legacy ==
=== TV series ===
Morgan Creek reportedly began developing a television series based on the original film in 2014. In the following year, Morgan Creek announced the sale of the domestic rights to its library of 78 films, but the production company plans to retain the TV rights to Nightbreed. In June 2018, Syfy, Morgan Creek and Barker teamed up to develop the series. It is being written by Josh Stolberg and directed by Michael Dougherty for SyFy.

=== The Cabal Cut ===
In 2009, Mark Miller, co-head of Barker's production company, Seraphim Films, helped track down the missing footage that was cut out of the director's cut of Nightbreed. Miller discovered, after talking to a production executive at the studio, that the footage was never actually lost but readily accessible. When asked, a studio executive said that there was not a big enough audience to warrant the studio spending money on a new, extended cut of the film. A VHS copy of Barker's 145-minute version of the film's mid-1989 workprint was discovered. It did not feature any of the re-shoots of Decker's murders. An extended 159-minute cut version, from another VHS found in July 2009, premiered on March 27, 2010, as part of the HorrorHound Weekend in Indianapolis. This new version adds almost an hour that was cut from the theatrical release, including a song sung by Lori, and more animation. Barker said that he hopes to bring back Danny Elfman to add more music.

In early 2012, Russell Cherrington, a senior lecturer in film and video production at the University of Derby, created a composite cut of the film using the footage found on both VHS tapes and a DVD then recently released by Warner Archive Collection, Warner's made-to-order DVD service. This version is the most complete version of Barker's film available and has been dubbed The Cabal Cut. The cut runs 155 minutes long and was shown at that year's "Mad Monster Party" in North Carolina with actors Craig Sheffer and Anne Bobby attending.

The "Mad Monster Party" projection of the Cabal Cut led to a renewal of interest among fans, especially on the Internet. A new petition was created and social networks were used to raise awareness for the extended cut and to encourage producers to release it. This would be colloquially known as "Occupy Midian", a term coined by actress Anne Bobby.

A Blu-Ray release of the "Cabal Cut" was announced on July 13, 2017, via the Clive Barker Podcast. This release utilized then-restored footage from the Director's Cut and the pre-existing VHS copies, for a total length of 145 minutes. The release features new material and commentary tracks exclusive to that release. Handled by Morgan Creek and Seraphim Films, the Cabal Cut Blu-Ray was released in a limited quantity through Clive Barker's online store.

=== Shout! Factory restoration and Director's Cut ===
In 2013, Shout! Factory released The Cabal Cut on DVD. This version was later clarified to be a brand new director's cut that uses the footage and not the full Cabal Cut.

Shout! Factory released The Director's Cut Blu-ray in 2014. This version, overseen by Clive Barker, runs twenty minutes longer than the theatrical version and contains forty minutes of new and altered footage. Shout, with Morgan Creek Entertainment, located the original film elements in the Warner archives to newly restore the sequences. Barker said, "when Scream Factory told me that they found the Nightbreed film footage, I was gob-smacked! This is the ultimate validation of choices made by myself and Mark Miller all the way back in 2008". Shout later published a Special Edition Blu-ray / DVD combo pack and a 3-disc limited edition Blu-ray, containing a booklet and the theatrical cut. When the limited edition sold out during pre-orders, Shout! doubled their production run.

== See also ==
- List of films featuring hallucinogens

== Bibliography ==
- Clive Barker's The Nightbreed Chronicles, Clive Barker, Murray Close, Stephen Jones, ISBN 1852862602.
- Clive Barker's Nightbreed: The Making of the Film, Clive Barker, Mark Salisbury, John Gilbert, ISBN 0006381367.
