= Hellbound: Hellraiser II =

1988 horror film by Tony Randel

- Theatrical release poster
- Directed by: Tony Randel
- Screenplay by: Peter Atkins
- Story by: Clive Barker
- Produced by: Christopher Figg
- Starring: Clare Higgins; Ashley Laurence; Kenneth Cranham
- Cinematography: Robin Vidgeon
- Edited by: Richard Marden
- Music by: Christopher Young
- Production companies: Troopstar; Film Futures; New World Pictures
- Distributed by: New World Pictures (United States); Castle Premier Releasing (United Kingdom)
- Release dates: 9 September 1988 (TIFF); 23 December 1988 (United States); 16 June 1989 (United Kingdom)
- Running time: 99 minutes
- Countries: United Kingdom; United States
- Language: English
- Box office: $12.1 million

Hellbound: Hellraiser II is a 1988 supernatural horror film directed by Tony Randel and starring Clare Higgins, Ashley Laurence and Kenneth Cranham. It is the second film in the Hellraiser franchise, and draws heavily upon its precursor, Hellraiser, which was released a year before with much of the same cast and crew. Laurence reprises her role as Kirsty Cotton, who is admitted into a psychiatric hospital after the events of the first film. There, the head doctor (Cranham) unleashes the Cenobites, a group of sadomasochistic beings from another dimension.

Clive Barker, who wrote and directed the first Hellraiser film, wrote the story of Hellraiser II and served as executive producer. Hellraiser II is an international co-production of the United Kingdom and the United States, and was screened at the Toronto Festival of Festivals on 9 September 1988, with mixed reviews upon release. It grossed $12.1 million at the box office and was followed by Hellraiser III: Hell on Earth in 1992.

== Plot ==
In a prologue set in 1920s India, British military officer Elliot Spencer is transformed into the Cenobite "Pinhead" after opening the Lament Configuration.

Shortly after her father is killed by Frank Cotton, Kirsty Cotton is admitted into a psychiatric hospital. Interviewed by Dr. Channard and his assistant, Kyle MacRae, she tells her account of the events and pleads with them to destroy the bloody mattress on which her murderous stepmother, Julia Cotton, died.

After hearing Kirsty's story, Dr. Channard, who is secretly obsessed with the Lament Configuration, has the mattress brought to his home and convinces a mentally ill patient named Mr. Browning to lie on it and cut himself with a razor. The resulting blood frees a skinless Julia from the Cenobite dimension, and she subsequently consumes Mr. Browning for energy. Having snuck inside Channard's house to investigate Kirsty's claims, Kyle (while hiding) witnesses the event and flees in terror.

Kirsty meets a young mute patient named Tiffany, who demonstrates an amazing aptitude for puzzles. Later that night, Kirsty is awakened in her room by a vision of a grisly, skinless figure whom she believes to be her father, and who writes a message in blood, begging her to rescue him from Hell. Kyle returns to the hospital and tells Kirsty he believes everything is true. The two return to Channard's house.

Meanwhile, Channard, seduced by Julia, has brought more mentally ill patients to his home for her to feed on, in order to complete her regeneration. Kirsty and Kyle arrive at Channard's home, where a now fully regenerated Julia kills Kyle and knocks Kirsty unconscious.

Channard and Julia kidnap Tiffany and force her to unlock the Lament Configuration so that they can enter the labyrinth-like world of Pinhead and the Cenobites. The Cenobites momentarily spare Tiffany, aware that while she was physically responsible for unlocking the Lament Configuration, the actual intention and desire behind it were Channard's. In Hell, the entity Leviathan—in the shape of a gigantic, elongated diamond—rotates in space above the labyrinth, shooting out black beams that make Channard remember some of the atrocities he committed. Julia calls Leviathan the "god of flesh, hunger, and desire... the Lord of the Labyrinth". Kirsty, who now possesses the Lament Configuration, follows them in.

Pinhead and the other Cenobites find Kirsty and tell her she is free to explore. Julia betrays Channard to Leviathan, who brutally turns Channard into a Cenobite. As Channard screams during the procedure, Julia reveals that she has a mission to bring souls to Leviathan, including Channard's.

Kirsty encounters Frank Cotton in the labyrinth, who reveals that he tricked her by posing as her father. Julia appears and tears out Frank's heart in revenge for Frank betraying her earlier, allowing Kirsty to escape. Julia is then sucked away by a vortex that opens within the labyrinth, leaving only her empty skin behind.

Kirsty and Tiffany reconnect and attempt to escape, but are ambushed by Channard, now a full, grotesque Cenobite. The girls flee and encounter Pinhead and the other Cenobites. Kirsty shows Pinhead a photograph of Spencer that she took from Channard's study, and he gradually remembers that he is human; the other Cenobites also remember that they were once human. Suddenly, Channard appears and beckons Tiffany, who is shocked into regaining her ability to speak. Pinhead and the other Cenobites attempt to fight Channard, but he effortlessly kills them all and their corpses transform into their human selves. Before being killed by Channard's scalpel-wielding "serpents," Spencer exchanges a poignant glance with Kirsty.

Channard traps Kirsty and Tiffany. Kirsty finds Julia's flayed-off skin and puts it on over her own to distract Channard and give Tiffany enough time to solve the Lament Configuration again—this time in reverse. In trying to extricate his trapped serpentine tentacles, Channard rips himself apart, and the door to hell is finally closed. The girls leave the hospital.

Two moving men are removing Dr. Channard's belongings from his home elsewhere. One is pulled inside the mattress, and the other witnesses a mysterious pillar rise from within. One of the faces fused to the pillar is a vagrant who earlier stalked Kirsty, (Note: As depicted in Hellraiser (1987)) who asks the man, "What's your pleasure, sir?"

== Cast ==
- Clare Higgins as Julia Cotton
  - Deborah Joel as Skinless Julia
- Ashley Laurence as Kirsty Cotton
- Kenneth Cranham as Dr Philip Channard
- Imogen Boorman as Tiffany
- Sean Chapman as Frank Cotton
- William Hope as Dr Kyle MacRae
- Doug Bradley as Pinhead / Captain Elliot Spencer
- Barbie Wilde as Female Cenobite
- Simon Bamford as Butterball
- Nicholas Vince as Chatterer
  - Kevin Cole as Chatterer's human form
- Oliver Smith as Mr Browning / Skinless Frank
- Angus McInnes as Detective Ronson
- James Tillitt as Officer Cortez
- Bradley Lavelle as Officer Kucich
- Catherine Chevalier as Tiffany's mother

== Production ==
=== Development ===
New World Pictures greenlit Hellbound as the first film was still in post-production. Because of the limited budget of the first film, Clive Barker and producer Christopher Figg felt there were many unanswered questions left behind that the sequel was conceived with this in mind. Due to a stressful experience making the first film, Barker opted not to return as director, although he remained as an executive producer and story writer.

Michael McDowell was in talks to write the screenplay and direct, but rewrites of Beetlejuice and health issues had him bow out early in pre-production. American filmmaker Tony Randel, a longtime New World Pictures employee and an uncredited editor on the first film, was hired as director due to his experience working with Barker. Hellbound would be his directorial debut, but he had previously contributed uncredited directing work on Def-Con 4 and Godzilla 1985. Peter Atkins, an associate of Barker's from his days as a playwright, was hired to write the script. While discussing the sequel's increased emphasis on adventure and special effects, Barker compared Hellbound to A Nightmare on Elm Street 3: Dream Warriors, saying that the film was "more akin to Dream Warriors in its roller-coaster aspect".

Randel later stated that the principal goal of the sequel was to make a larger-scale film than its predecessor and to expand the fictional universe established in Hellraiser, particularly the world inhabited by the Cenobites.

=== Writing ===
Early drafts of the screenplay featured Kirsty entering Hell to rescue her father, Larry Cotton, and introduced a villain named Dr. Malahide, who was subsequently renamed Dr. Channard. During revisions with director Tony Randel, screenwriter Peter Atkins also reworked the original conception of Hell's ruling power, an organic entity known as the Great Wound, into the geometric structure of Leviathan seen in the finished film.

Andrew Robinson, who portrayed Larry in the original film, declined to reprise his role despite appearing in the second draft of the screenplay. Robinson later explained that he had been disappointed by the script and did not wish to diminish his experience of making the first film. Atkins subsequently expressed relief that the character had been removed, believing that Larry's absence benefited the narrative.

=== Casting ===
Nicholas Vince, who portrayed the Chatterer Cenobite, requested modifications to the character's makeup because the original design severely restricted his vision. The redesigned makeup allowed him to see, and a sequence explaining the character's altered appearance was filmed but omitted from the finished film. During filming of the Cenobites' death sequence, Vince was accidentally injured when a hook attached to the revolving torture pillar entered the roof of his mouth.

British Shakespearean actor Kenneth Cranham, who plays Channard, has said that he took up the offer rather than play King John at Stratford because he thought the first film was "extraordinary" and because his payment would cover the cost of a tax bill and some French curtains. However, it is often claimed that he took the role because a young relative pestered him into it. Francis Matthews was also offered the role.

Oliver Smith, who portrayed the skinless version of Frank in the original Hellraiser, reprised the role for a brief scene in the sequel. He also portrayed Browning, the psychiatric patient whose death is used to resurrect Julia. Smith had originally been cast as the skinless Frank partly because his slender physique suited the special-effects makeup.

=== Filming ===
Several key crew members from the original film returned for the sequel, including cinematographer Robin Vidgeon and special-effects designer Bob Keen. Principal photography took place at Pinewood Studios in Buckinghamshire in early 1988.

The production was affected by exchange-rate fluctuations following the October 1987 stock market crash. According to contemporary reporting in Screen International, the film's budget had been agreed in US dollars before the decline in the value of the dollar against sterling, requiring several planned scenes and ideas to be revised. The production ultimately completed filming under its revised budget.

Filming took place mainly at Pinewood Studios. Heatherden Hall in Iver Heath, Buckinghamshire was used for the exterior shots of the Channard Institute.

Randel drew on the work of M. C. Escher when designing the Labyrinth and the world of Leviathan. He described the geometric environments as a psychological rather than religious representation of Hell, reflecting his belief that the realm depicted in the film existed symbolically within the subconscious mind.

=== Soundtrack ===
Composer Christopher Young also returned to compose a more bombastic score larger in scope. For the horn-like sound supposedly emanating from Leviathan in the center of Hell's labyrinth, he had the morse code for the word god incorporated.

=== Deleted and alternate scenes ===
Originally, there was going to be an extra scene during the ending when Kirsty and Tiffany are running from Channard. The scene was planned so that during their escape the duo run into a doctor and nurse. The doctor demands to know what are they doing. Kirsty backs away in horror when suddenly the doctor and nurse turn into Pinhead and the Female Cenobite, before she and Tiffany continue running. The scene was filmed but was ultimately dropped from the final cut for two reasons. One was because the filmmakers thought that having actor Doug Bradley as a normal doctor would confuse the viewers, and another was because the special effects for the scene turned out poorly, so it was decided to discard it altogether. However, a photographer who was on set took some photos of Pinhead and the Female Cenobite dressed as surgeons which were used for promotion of the film, and were also used on some VHS/DVD covers, confusing fans and starting rumors about an "infamous deleted surgery scene". Some trailers do show a few shots from this unfinished scene, as well as parts of another deleted scene with Chatterer stopping the elevator with his hand and jumping at Kirsty and Tiffany. The lost scene was eventually rediscovered on a VHS workprint and announced as an extra for Arrow Video's Blu-ray reissue of the first three films in the series.

Another scene that was filmed, but then deleted, was Kirsty and Tiffany being chased by the creature known as the Engineer in the first installment.

Julia was originally intended to survive the end of the film, appearing as the head embedded in the "Hell Pillar" during the final scene. However, Clare Higgins did not want to return for more sequels, and requested her character be killed off.

== Release ==
Hellbound was initially rated X by the Motion Picture Association of America, which would have limited it to those 17 and older. Barker attributed this to preferring explicit displays of the grotesque rather than hinting at it. Six minutes were cut to qualify for an R rating.

Hellbound: Hellraiser II was shown at the Toronto Festival of Festivals on 9 September 1988. It was released in the United States on 23 December.

=== Home media ===
Hellbound: Hellraiser II was released on VHS in the United States by New World Video on 4 April 1989. The film was subsequently released on DVD by Anchor Bay Entertainment in 1998, followed by a special edition in 2000. In September 2004, Anchor Bay included the film in a Hellraiser Trilogy DVD collection in the United Kingdom.

In October 2015, Arrow Video released a new 2K restoration of the film, approved by cinematographer Robin Vidgeon, as part of its Hellraiser: The Scarlet Box Blu-ray collection in the United Kingdom. The release included audio commentaries with director Tony Randel, screenwriter Peter Atkins and actress Ashley Laurence, the documentary Leviathan: The Story of Hellbound: Hellraiser II, and the first home-video presentation of the deleted surgeon scene, recovered from a VHS workprint. The collection was released in the United States in December 2016, while a standalone Blu-ray edition of Hellbound followed on 24 September 2019.

On 23 October 2023, Arrow Video released a new 4K restoration of Hellbound, sourced from the original camera negative, as part of its Hellraiser: Quartet of Torment collection in the United Kingdom. The set included the first four films in the franchise on Ultra HD Blu-ray, with Dolby Vision and additional special features, including a new audio commentary by film historians Kim Newman and Stephen Jones. The collection subsequently received a United States release in October 2024.

== Reception ==
=== Box office ===
During its theatrical release, Hellbound grossed $12,090,735 in the United States and Canada, and in the UK, Hellbound: Hellraiser II opened at #1 in June 1989 with about £575k and eventually reached roughly £1.74 million.

=== Accolades ===
Hellbound: Hellraiser II was nominated for Best Horror Film at the 16th Saturn Awards. Christopher Young won the Saturn Award for Best Music for his score.

=== Critical response ===
On the review aggregator website Rotten Tomatoes, 53% of 34 critics' reviews are positive, with an average rating of 5.6/10. The website's consensus reads: "Hellbound: Hellraiser II retains the twisted visual thrill of its predecessor, although seams in the plot are already starting to show." Metacritic, which uses a weighted average, assigned the film a score of 41 out of 100, based on 13 critics, indicating "mixed or average" reviews.

Roger Ebert of the Chicago Sun-Times described it as "some kind of avant-garde film strip in which there is no beginning, no middle, no end, but simply a series of gruesome images that can be watched in any order", giving it half a star. Caryn James of The New York Times wished for more plot and fewer "silly" effects: "Ogling strange creatures is the film's true reason for being". In a more positive review, Chris Willman of the Los Angeles Times called it "faster and campier" than its predecessor, "more of an action/adventure picture this time around, if still an exceptionally grisly one".

== Legacy ==
The film has subsequently received positive retrospective assessments, particularly for expanding the mythology established in the original Hellraiser. In a retrospective review, Michael Gingold of Fangoria described Hellbound as a successful example of a horror sequel, praising its continuation of the original story and its deeper exploration of the characters and mythology. On the film's 30th anniversary, Meagan Navarro of Bloody Disgusting similarly highlighted its expansion of the series' universe through the introduction of Leviathan, the Labyrinth and further details concerning the origins of the Cenobites.

Hellbound influenced later horror films. Steven Kostanski, co-director of The Void (2016), cited Hellraiser II and Prince of Darkness as influences on the film, saying that The Void sought to take elements of those films further with the filmmakers' own sensibilities. Co-director Jeremy Gillespie said that they were particularly influenced by the "vibe" of those films.

The film was one of the principal influences on the 2026 survival horror video game Clive Barker's Hellraiser: Revival. Narrative director Anthony de Fault said that the development team returned specifically to the first two Hellraiser films and Barker's novella The Hellbound Heart when establishing the game's themes and atmosphere, while attempting to exclude other influences.

== Sequel ==
A sequel titled Hellraiser III: Hell on Earth, was released in 1992.
