= Salome (1973 film) =

- Directed by: Clive Barker
- Written by: Clive Barker
- Produced by: Clive Barker
- Starring: Anne Taylor; Graham Bickley; Clive Barker; Doug Bradley; Phil Rimmer; Lyn Darnell; Julia Blake
- Music by: Adrian Carson
- Release date: 1973
- Country: United Kingdom
- Language: English

Salome is a 1973 amateur British short horror silent film directed and produced by Clive Barker and starring Anne Taylor, Graham Bickley, Barker, Doug Bradley and Phil Rimmer. It was written by Barker based on the play of the same title by Oscar Wilde. The music was composed by Adrian Carson.

== Cast ==
- Anne Taylor
- Graham Bickley
- Clive Barker
- Doug Bradley
- Phil Rimmer
- Lyn Darnell
- Julia Blake
