= Clive Barker's Nightbreed: The Interactive Movie =

1990 video game

- Developer: Impact Software
- Publisher: Ocean Software
- Platforms: Amiga, Atari ST, MS-DOS
- Release: 1990
- Genre: Adventure

Clive Barker's Nightbreed: The Interactive Movie is an adventure video game developed by Impact Software and published by Ocean Software in 1990 for Amiga, Atari ST, and MS-DOS. It is based on Clive Barker's movie Nightbreed, which in turn is based on Barker's novella Cabal. It was planned to be part of a trilogy, alongside Clive Barker's Nightbreed: The Action Game and an ultimately-unreleased RPG.

== Plot ==
The player takes the role of Aaron Boone, who must stop the Earth Police from destroying a utopian planet named Midian. The game is split into many, mostly action-based, sequences, which replay scenes from the film in an interactive way.

== Release ==
To promote the release of Nightbreed: The Interactive Movie, Ocean Software and Image Animation ran a contest in The One magazine, where a randomly selected winner who gave the correct answer to three trivia questions received an autographed set of books by Clive Barker, as well as the mask used for Doctor Decker in the film.

== Reception ==
Reception

Review scores
Publication	Score
Amiga Action	78% (Amiga)
Amiga Joker	78% (Amiga)
The One	75% (Amiga)
ST Format	58% (Atari ST)
Amiga User International	50% (Amiga)
Datormagazin	3/10 (Amiga)
Aktueller Software Markt	3/12 (Amiga); 3/12 (Atari ST); 3/12 (DOS)
Power Play	19% (Amiga); 19% (Atari ST); 19% (DOS)

Nightbreed: The Interactive Movie received mixed reviews from critics. The One deemed it one of the more competent arcade adventures available. Amiga Action felt the game had a lot of wasted potential. Amiga User International noted that Cinemaware added extra interactivity to their games after being criticized, and hoped Impact did the same. Amiga Computing praised the game's range of graphics, but disliked its gameplay. ST Format noted the title's unique approach to the licence.
