= Nicholas Vince =

Anglo-German actor (born 1958)

- Born: May 1958 (age 68); West Germany
- Occupations: Actor; author; filmmaker

Nicholas Vince (born May 1958) is an actor, writer, and film maker who was born in West Germany and lives in South London. He trained at Mountview Theatre Academy, and shortly after graduating he met Clive Barker, modeling for him and later being cast as The Chatterer Cenobite in Hellraiser in 1987 and in its sequel Hellbound: Hellraiser II in 1988. He subsequently played Kinski in Barker's 1990 film Nightbreed. Since 2016 he's been Patron of the London Horror Festival, the UK's original and largest festival of live horror performance. In 2016 he was awarded the "London Horror Society Award for Outstanding Contribution to UK Independent Horror" and in 2018 a "Lifetime of Torment Award" at Texas Frightmare.

For Marvel Comics he wrote stories for the Hellraiser and Nightbreed comics plus the series 'Warheads' and Mortigan Goth. He modelled for the art of John Bolton and for Dave McKean in Cages. He served as both secretary and chairman of the Comics Creators Guild. He's published two collections short stories What Monsters Do and Other People's Darkness. In 2013 he dramatised two of the stories from What Monsters Do, "Green Eyes" and "Tunes From The Music Hall". He has also written two origin stories for his Hellraiser character The Chatterer, the short story "Look, See" appeared in the magazine FEAR, and "Prayers for Desire" was published within Hellraiser Anthology Volume 2.

He has written and directed four short films: The Night Whispered screened in the UK, USA and France; Your Appraisal is on a festival run; Necessary Evils will be included as a DVD extra on For We Are Many from Hex Studios and Kirby, A Hero for the Soska Sisters Blood Drive. In addition he has created two music videos, "We Are The Hearts" by EXGF and "We Need Blood", also for the Soska Sisters Blood Drive.

His interview series The Luggage in the Crypt appeared in the magazine Skeleton Crew. Since 2014 he's hosted a chat show on YouTube, Chattering with Nicholas Vince, where he interviews independent film makers, writers, artists and actors.

In 2016 he starred in horror director Katie Bonham's Mindless, with 14 film festival entrances and one win so far.

== Filmography ==
- Hellraiser (1987) – The Chattering Cenobite
- Hellbound: Hellraiser II (1988) – The Chatterer
- Nightbreed (1990) – Kinski
- The Hairy Hands (2010) – (voice)
- Mindless (2016) Horror short
- Hollower (2016)
- Borley Rectory (2017)
- The Black Gloves (2017)
- Book of Monsters (2018)
- Heckle (2019)
- Fuck You Immortality (2019)
- They're Outside (2020) - Richard
- Paintball Massacre (2020)

=== Audio ===
Year	Title	Role	Notes
2025	The Temple of the Killer Tiger Monkeys	Efuhofcn	Podcast series
