= August (1996 film) =

- Theatrical release poster
- Directed by: Anthony Hopkins
- Screenplay by: Julian Mitchell
- Based on: Uncle Vanya by Anton Chekhov
- Produced by: June Wyndham-Davies; Pippa Cross
- Starring: Anthony Hopkins; Leslie Phillips; Kate Burton; Gawn Grainger
- Cinematography: Robin Vidgeon
- Edited by: Edward Mansell
- Music by: Anthony Hopkins; George Fenton (conductor)
- Production companies: Majestic Films International; Newcomm; Granada Film Productions
- Distributed by: FilmFour Distributors; (United Kingdom); The Samuel Goldwyn Company; (United States)
- Release dates: 16 February 1996 (Norway); 19 April 1996 (United States); 24 April 1996 (USA Film Festival)
- Running time: 94 minutes
- Countries: United Kingdom; United States
- Language: English

August is a 1996 British drama film directed by and starring Anthony Hopkins as Ieuan (IPA:j/əɨ/a/n) Davies, and featuring Rhys Ifans in a small role in one of his earliest films, as Griffiths. It is an adaptation of Anton Chekhov's 1899 play Uncle Vanya, with the character Ieuan Davies taking over the title role.

The film was Hopkins's first feature film with a full cast (he had previously directed the one-man-performance of Dylan Thomas: Return Journey in 1990). It would be over a decade before his next directorial effort, Slipstream in 2007, which he also wrote and for which he also composed the score.

During an interview on the podcast, The Ghost of Hollywood, cinematographer Robin Vidgeon stated that working with Anthony Hopkins on August was the highlight of his career.

== Cast ==
- Anthony Hopkins as Ieuan Davies
- Leslie Phillips as Prof. Alexander Blathwaite
- Kate Burton as Helen Blathwaite
- Gawn Grainger as Dr. Michael Lloyd
- Rhian Morgan as Sian Blathwaite
- Menna Trussler as Gwen
- Rhoda Lewis as Mair Davies
- Hugh Lloyd as Thomas Prosser
- Huw Garmon as Dafydd Edwards
- Rhys Ifans as Griffiths
- Susan Ellen Flynn as Rhianon
- Buddug Morgan as Nesta

== Adaptation and issues ==
The film adapts Uncle Vanya to a turn-of-the-century Welsh setting, emphasizing the hardships of Welsh industrial life in the slate quarries and Welsh-English turmoil as an English professor upsets normal Welsh life when he arrives at the Welsh estate which acts as his vacation home (at one point Ieuan states that he feels that he has been cheated by the Prof. Blathwaite, just as "the English have always cheated the Welsh").

== Language ==
It is primarily in English, with a few lines in Welsh here or there - such as diolch yn fawr iawn ("thank you very much"), cariad (a term of endearment, meaning "love"), and iechyd da ("cheers").

== See also ==
- Meibion Glyndŵr, on Welsh-English relations surrounding the English taking vacation homes in Wales.
- List of Welsh films
