= Doug Bradley =

English actor and author

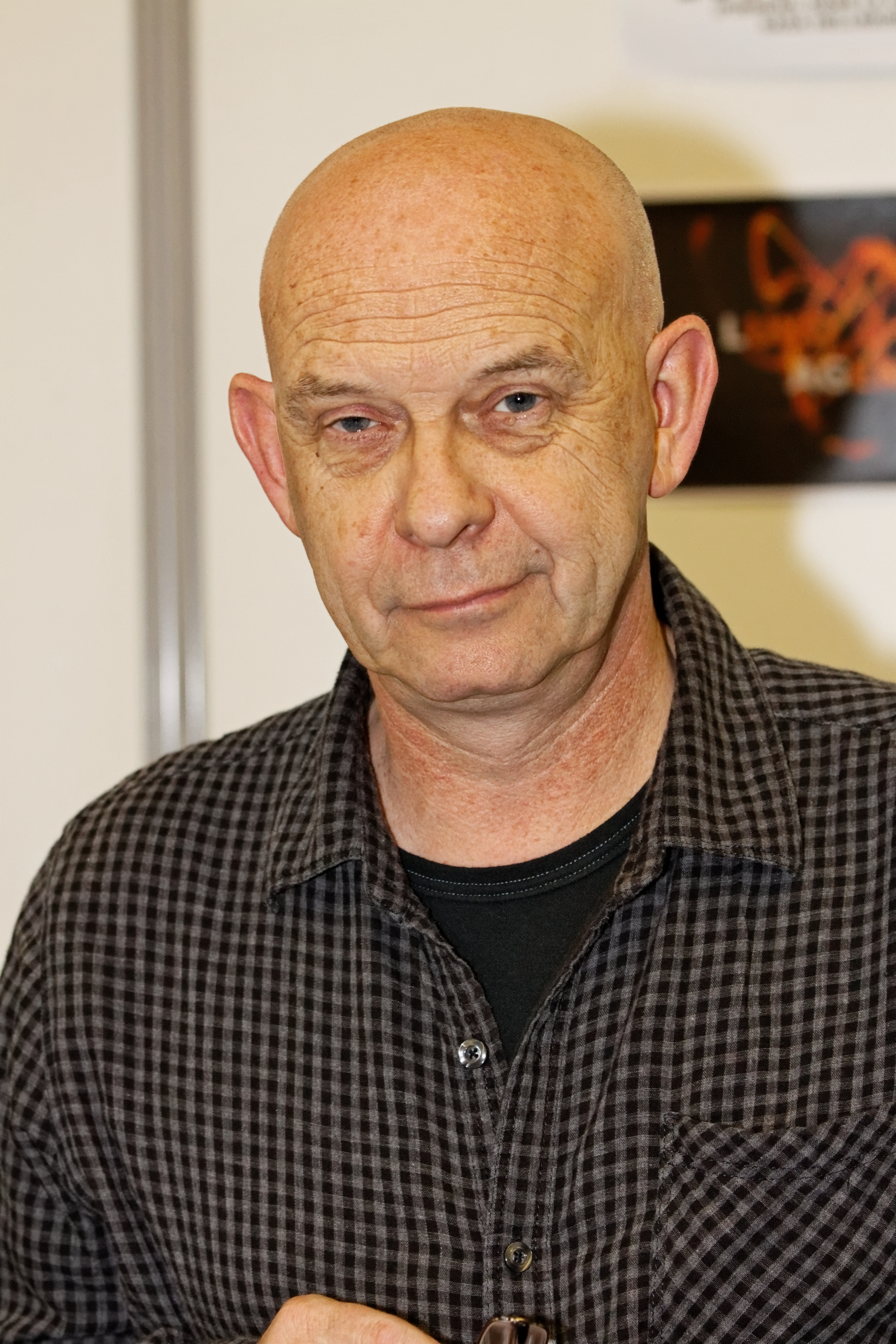
- Bradley in February 2012
- Born: Douglas William Bradley; 7 September 1954 (age 72); Liverpool, England
- Occupation: Actor
- Years active: 1973–present
- Spouse: Steph Sciullo
- Website: dougbradley.com

Douglas William Bradley (born 7 September 1954) is an English actor best known for his role as the Cenobite leader Pinhead in the Hellraiser film series.

== Early life ==
Douglas William Bradley was born in Liverpool on 7 September 1954. He attended Quarry Bank High School in the Allerton suburb of Liverpool.

== Career ==
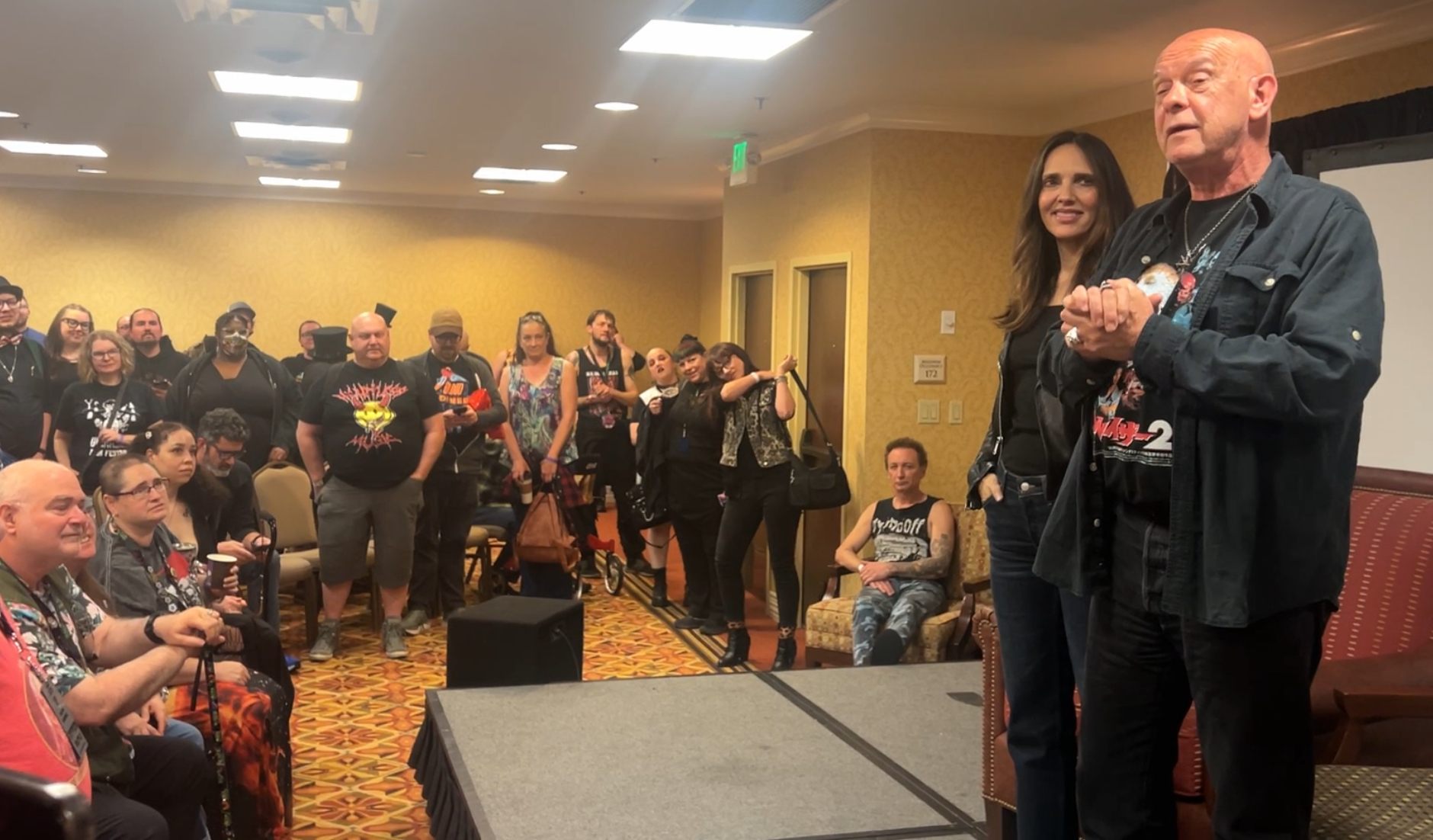
Doug Bradley thanks fans at a convention in Seattle as he shares the stage with fellow Hellraiser actor Ashley Laurence.

Bradley is best known for portraying the villainous Cenobite leader Pinhead in the first eight installments of the Hellraiser film series, which were adapted from books written by his long-time friend and former classmate Clive Barker; he also portrayed Captain Elliot Spencer, the man who later became Pinhead, in Hellbound: Hellraiser II (1988) and Hellraiser III: Hell on Earth (1992). He is one of only seven actors to play the same horror character at least six consecutive times, the others being Christopher Lee (Count Dracula), Robert Englund (Freddy Krueger), Warwick Davis (the Leprechaun), Brad Dourif (Chucky), Tobin Bell (Jigsaw), and Roger L. Jackson (Ghostface). Due to his eventual skill at application and removal of the Pinhead appliances and costume, he has been credited in some of the Hellraiser films as an assistant make-up artist named Bill Bradley, using his middle name.

Bradley appeared as a gym teacher in an advert for insurance company Direct Line. He has performed narrations on several songs by Cradle of Filth, the first being 2000's "Her Ghost in the Fog", as well as "Death Magick for Adepts" and "Tortured Soul Asylum" from the album Midian. However, he could not appear in the music video and was replaced by David McEwen. He also appeared on "Swansong for a Raven" and "Satyriasis" from the band's 2004 album, Nymphetamine. In 2006, he lent his narrations to "Rise of the Pentagram" and "Tonight in Flames" from the album Thornography. Continuing in this vein, Bradley contributed guest vocals to Cradle of Filth's 2008 album Godspeed on the Devil's Thunder, on all songs except "Tragic Kingdom". He returned for their 2021 album, Existence Is Futile, on the songs "Sisters of the Mist" and "Suffer Our Dominion".

Bradley has appeared in many short horror films, such as Red Lines and On Edge. He is a member of the UK animation company Renga Media, makers of the independent Dominator films and shorts, dividing job roles between producer and voice actor. He voiced the Loc-Nar in the short animated crossover Heavy Metal vs. Dominator, in which characters from the Dominator universe meet and fight with characters from the film Heavy Metal 2000.

After his roles in the Hellraiser films and the 1990 horror film Nightbreed, 2006 saw Bradley star in Pumpkinhead: Ashes to Ashes and 2008 saw him once again returning to Clive Barker's cinematic universe by way of a featured appearance in Book of Blood. He had a small guest star appearance in the 2008 black comic horror The Cottage. In 2010, he starred in the Anglo-Spanish horror film Exorcismus, and he joined the Nazi zombie horror The 4th Reich in March 2010.

In 2011, he played a man called the Doctor in the British film noir Jack Falls. In June 2011, it was announced that Bradley would be providing a voice-over for an independent film called Lucifer's Unholy Desire, as well as performing in the film The Reverend. In 2012, he played "Maynard" in the fifth film of the Wrong Turn series, Wrong Turn 5: Bloodlines. In 2013, he performed in the indie film Scream Park.

Bradley voiced the Sith Emperor for the massively multiplayer online role-playing game Star Wars: The Old Republic, based in the Star Wars universe. Specifically he voiced the Emperor as Vitiate.

In 2018, Bradley joined Blackcraft Wrestling as “The Preacher”, a cult leader who acts as a General Manager type figure to the promotion.

In 2020, he created a YouTube channel on which he reads books and poems out loud. He returned on Cradle of Filth's 2021 album Existence Is Futile, providing narration for the track "Suffer Our Dominion" and the bonus track "Sisters of the Mist".

In 2022, Bradley voiced the character Goayre Heddagh alongside actor Tim Curry in the animated horror film Dagon Troll World Chronicles.

In 2023 Bradley played Batman villain Joe Chill in the CW television show Gotham Knights. The portrayal was different than other live action versions. The episode he was introduced in was titled "A Chill over Gotham".

Bradley is the author of Sacred Monsters: Behind the Mask of the Horror Actor, which explores the history of masks in society and their applications in horror films.

== Personal life ==
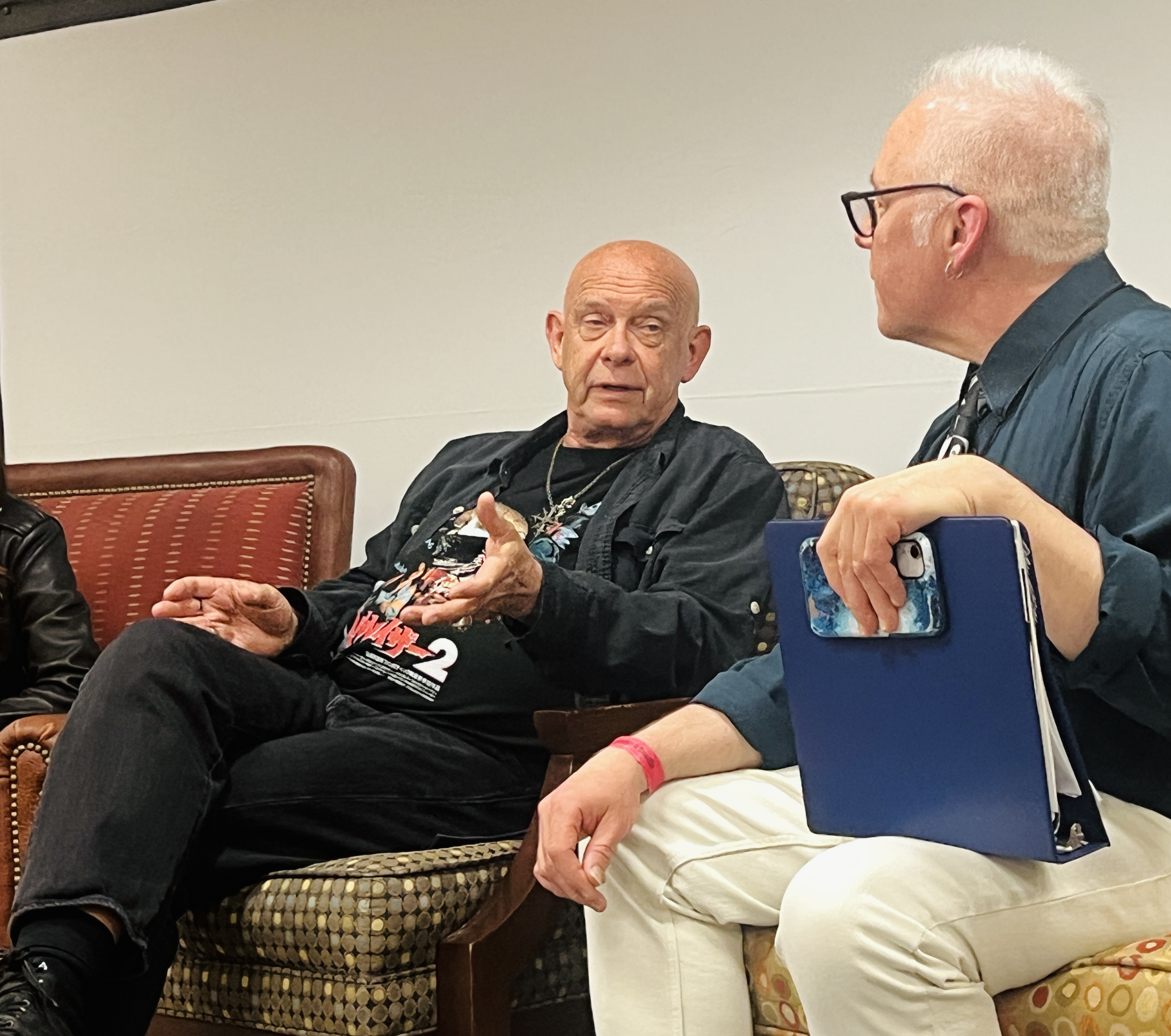
Doug Bradley talks with journalist Tony Kay on 3 May 2025 in Seattle.

Bradley is married to Steph Sciullo, with whom he lives in Pittsburgh.

Bradley has been a close friend of Clive Barker since they attended Quarry Bank High School in Liverpool together. He has worked with Barker on various projects since the early 1970s, most notably Hellraiser, which is adapted from Barker's novella The Hellbound Heart.

== Filmography ==
=== Film ===
Year	Title	Role	Notes
1987	Hellraiser	Pinhead	
1988	Hellbound: Hellraiser II	Pinhead / Captain Elliot Spencer	
1990	Nightbreed	Dirk Lylesberg	
1992	Hellraiser III: Hell on Earth	Pinhead / Captain Elliot Spencer	
1993	Shepherd on the Rock	James Culzean	
1995	Proteus	Leonard Brinkstone	
1996	Hellraiser: Bloodline	Pinhead	
1996	Killer Tongue	Wig	
1998	Driven	Eric Myers	
1999	An Ideal Husband	Brackpool	As Douglas Bradley
2000	Hellraiser: Inferno	Pinhead	Direct-to-video
2002	Hellraiser: Hellseeker	Pinhead / Merchant	Direct-to-video
2003	Dominator	Dr. Payne, Lord Desecrator	Voice role
2005	Hellraiser: Deader	Pinhead	Direct-to-video
2005	The Prophecy: Uprising	Laurel	Direct-to-video
2005	Hellraiser: Hellworld	Pinhead	Direct-to-video
2008	The Cottage	Villager with Dog	
2008	Ten Dead Men	The Narrator	
2009	Book of Blood	Tollington	
2009	Umbrage	Jacob	
2010	Exorcismus	Padre Ennis	As Douglas Bradley
2011	Jack Falls	The Doctor	
2011	The Reverend	Reverend Andrews	
2012	The Infliction	Agent Wilson	
2012	Deer Crossing	Sheriff Lock	
2012	Lucifer's Unholy Desire	Rev. McDowell	Voice role
2012	Wrong Turn 5: Bloodlines	Maynard Odets	Direct-to-video
2012	Scream Park	Mr. Hyde	
2013	Shame the Devil	Victor	
2014	Nerd Love	Doug Bradley	
2016	Howard Lovecraft and the Frozen Kingdom	Nyarlathotep	Voice role, direct-to-video
2017	Howard Lovecraft and the Undersea Kingdom	Nyarlathotep	Voice role, direct-to-video
2018	Howard Lovecraft and the Kingdom of Madness	Nyarlathotep	Voice role, direct-to-video
2019	Back Fork	Sheriff	
2021	Alien Danger 2! With Raven Van Slender	General Legs	Voice role
2022	Corrective Measures	Senator Zechariah	
2022	The Barn Part II	Walter Daniels	
2022	The United States of Horror: Chapter 2	Narrator	Voice role
2023	The Exorcists	Father Patrick Ryland	
2023	The Trip	Jack A. Caruso	
2024	Witch Hunter	King Konrad	

=== Short film ===
Year	Title	Role	Notes
1973	Salome	King Herod	
1978	The Forbidden		
1999	On Edge	Dr. Matthews	
2002	Red Lines	Teacher	
2008	To The Devil His Due	John Armstrong	
2010	The Hairy Hands	Mr. Brook	Voice role
2013	A Hand to Play	Mr. Trent	

=== Television ===
Year	Title	Role	Notes
1990	The Bill	Pete Henderson	Episode: "Friends and Neighbours"
1992	USA Up All Night	Pinhead	Episode: "Glitch!/Eating Raoul"
1993	Inspector Morse	Clergyman Williams	Episode: "Twilight of the Gods"
1995	The Big Game	Harry Woolf	Television film
1996	Jim's Gift	Mr. Winthrop	Television film
1998	Archangel Thunderbird	Dr. Churchill	Television film
1999	Honky Sausages	Honky Doctor	1 episode
2000, 2010	Doctors	Graham Sharpe, Greg Steel / Doc Jones	Episodes: "God's Will" and "The Living Gaylights"
2001	Judge John Deed	Inspector Lannon	Episode: "Exacting Justice"
2001	The Armando Iannucci Shows		Episode: "Time Passing"
2002	Paradise Heights	Customs Officer	1 episode
2005	The Commander	Tim Gad	Episodes: "Blackdog (Part One)" & "Blackdog (Part Two)"
2005	No Angels	Mr. Asquith	2 episodes
2006	Pumpkinhead: Ashes to Ashes	Doc Fraser	Television film
2018	Lore	Dr. Robert Knox	
2020	JJ Villard's Fairy Tales	Kenneth	Voice role, episode: Boypunzel
2021–2022	Dota: Dragon's Blood	Kashurra, Byssrak	Voice role, 8 episodes
2023	Gotham Knights	Joe Chill	Episode: "A Chill in Gotham"
2025	Invincible	Technicians	Voice role, 2 episodes

=== Audio ===
Year	Title	Role	Notes
2006	Doctor Who: Pier Pressure	Professor Talbot	Audio Drama for Big Finish Productions
2009	Bernice Summerfield: Secret Origins	Samuel Frost	Audio Drama for Big Finish Productions
2009–2014	Doug Bradley's Spinechillers	Narrator	Audio books, 13 volumes
2013	Blake's 7: A Rebellion Reborn	Nico	Audio Drama for Big Finish Productions
2022	Hollow	Kurtz	Podcast series
2025	The Temple of the Killer Tiger Monkeys	Yertafgryn	Podcast series

=== Music video ===
Year	Title	Artist	Role	Notes
1992	"Hellraiser"	Motörhead	Pinhead	
2015	The Misfits: Tour Video Collection	Misfits	Abraham van Helsing	video shown only live on stage
2023	"Blood for the Blood God" (Feat. HEALTH)	Gunship	Narrator	

=== Video games ===
Year	Title	Role	Notes
2011	Star Wars: The Old Republic	Vitiate the Sith Emperor, Additional voices	Voice role
2014	Star Wars: The Old Republic – Shadow of Revan	Vitiate the Sith Emperor	Voice role
2021	Dead by Daylight	The Cenobite	Voice role
2022	Star Wars: The Old Republic – Legacy of the Sith	Vitiate the Sith Emperor	Voice role
2026	Invincible VS	Technicians	Voice role
2026	Clive Barker's Hellraiser: Revival	Pinhead	Voice role

=== Discography ===
==== Cradle of Filth guest appearances ====
- Midian (2000) – narration on "Death Magick for Adepts", "Her Ghost in the Fog" and "Tortured Soul Asylum"
- Nymphetamine (2004) – narration on "Satyriasis" and "Swansong for a Raven"; Cthulhu chant on "Mother of Abominations"
- Thornography (2006) – narration on "Tonight in Flames" and "Rise of the Pentagram"
- Godspeed on the Devil's Thunder (2008) – lead narration
- Evermore Darkly... (2011) – narration on "Transmission from Hell"
- Existence Is Futile (2021) – narration on "Suffer Our Dominion" and "Sisters of the Mist"
