= Sean Chapman =

English actor and writer (born 1962)

- Born: 2 June 1961 (age 65); Greenwich, London, England
- Occupations: Actor; writer
- Years active: 1978–2016

Sean Chapman (born 2 June 1961) is an English actor and writer. He is known for his collaborations with director Alan Clarke, including Scum (1979), Made in Britain (1982) and Contact (1985), and for portraying Frank Cotton in Clive Barker's horror film Hellraiser (1987) and its sequel Hellbound: Hellraiser II (1988).

His stage work includes the role of Prior Walter in the original London production of Tony Kushner's Angels in America at the Royal National Theatre in 1992. He later became known to video-game audiences as the voice of Sgt. Michael "Psycho" Sykes in Crysis (2007), Crysis Warhead (2008) and Crysis 3 (2013).

== Early life ==
Chapman was born in Greenwich, London. As a teenager, he attended stage school, an experience he later credited with giving him a sense of belonging and leading him toward acting.

While still young, Chapman was introduced to director Alan Clarke, who was casting the feature-film version of Scum. Chapman was cast as James, one of the inmates at the film's borstal.

== Career ==
=== Film and television ===
Chapman made his screen debut in Passion Flower Hotel (1978) before appearing in Scum the following year. His work with Alan Clarke continued in television films including Made in Britain and Contact. Chapman later described Clarke as an important influence on his early career and praised the director's openness and generosity toward actors.

During the 1980s, Chapman frequently played hard-edged or working-class characters. His film credits included Party Party (1983), Underworld (1985), Eat the Rich (1987) and The Fourth Protocol (1987).

In 1987, he played Frank Cotton in Clive Barker's directorial debut Hellraiser. He returned as Frank in Hellbound: Hellraiser II the following year. Chapman later said that while he remained interested in horror, he was more affected by realistic violence such as that depicted in Scum, Contact and Made in Britain than by effects-driven screen violence.

His later film work included For Queen and Country (1989), One of the Hollywood Ten (2000), in which he portrayed film director Edward Dmytryk, Gangster No. 1 (2000), Joy Division (2006) and A Mighty Heart (2007).

On television, Chapman appeared in series including The Professionals, Grange Hill, K-9 and Company, Cadfael, Wycliffe, Peak Practice, Kavanagh QC, Midsomer Murders and Murphy's Law.

=== Theatre ===
Chapman has also worked extensively in theatre. In 1992, he played Prior Walter in the first London production of Tony Kushner's Angels in America: Millennium Approaches at the National Theatre's Cottesloe Theatre, directed by Declan Donnellan. The production also featured Henry Goodman, Marcus D'Amico, Nick Reding and Felicity Montagu.

In a later interview, Chapman contrasted the role with the tougher characters for which he had often been cast on screen, describing the opportunity to play Prior as a welcome departure from years of typecasting.

=== Video games ===
Chapman voiced Sgt. Michael "Psycho" Sykes in the first-person shooter Crysis (2007). He reprised the role as the protagonist of Crysis Warhead (2008) and again in Crysis 3 (2013).

== Writing ==
In addition to acting, Chapman has written fiction. He has said that writing gave him greater creative independence during periods between acting jobs, which he found increasingly difficult.

His fiction has included the novels A Distant Prospect (2010), The Blood in the Moon (2012) and The Mason's Son (2017), as well as the short-story collection Ms Derby Requires (2013). In a 2012 interview, Chapman discussed Ian McEwan and Alain de Botton among his literary influences and said his fiction was concerned with desire, relationships and mortality.

== Selected filmography ==
=== Film ===
Year	Title	Role
1978	Passion Flower Hotel	Rodney
1979	Scum	James
1983	Party Party	Sam Diggins
1985	Underworld	Buchanan
1987	Eat the Rich	Mark
1987	The Fourth Protocol	Captain Lyndhurst
1987	Hellraiser	Frank Cotton
1988	Hellbound: Hellraiser II	Frank Cotton
1989	For Queen and Country	Bob Harper
2000	One of the Hollywood Ten	Edward Dmytryk
2000	Gangster No. 1	Bent Cop
2006	Joy Division	Harris
2007	A Mighty Heart	U.S. journalist
2010	Psychosis	Detective Sergeant

=== Television ===
Year	Title	Role	Notes
1978	Grange Hill	Andrews	
1980	The Professionals	Coleman	Episode: "The Acorn Syndrome"
1981	K-9 and Company	Peter Tracey	Television film
1982	Made in Britain		Television film
1995	Wycliffe	Bonetti	Episode: "All for Love"
1997	Cadfael		Episode: "The Raven in the Foregate"

== Video games ==
- Battle Engine Aquila (2003)
- Crysis (2007) – Psycho
- Crysis Warhead (2008) – Psycho
- Crysis 3 (2013) – Psycho
