= Hellraiser =

1987 film by Clive Barker

- Theatrical release poster
- Directed by: Clive Barker
- Written by: Clive Barker
- Based on: The Hellbound Heart by Clive Barker
- Produced by: Christopher Figg
- Starring: Andrew Robinson; Clare Higgins; Ashley Laurence
- Cinematography: Robin Vidgeon
- Edited by: Richard Marden
- Music by: Christopher Young
- Production company: Film Futures
- Distributed by: Entertainment Film Distributors
- Release date: 10 September 1987 (London)
- Running time: 93 minutes
- Country: United Kingdom
- Language: English
- Budget: $1-3 million
- Box office: $30 million

Hellraiser is a 1987 British supernatural horror film written and directed by Clive Barker in his directorial debut. Based on his own 1986 novella The Hellbound Heart, the film's plot concerns a mystical puzzle box that summons the Cenobites, a group of extra-dimensional, sadomasochistic beings who cannot differentiate between pain and pleasure. It stars Andrew Robinson, Clare Higgins, Ashley Laurence, and Doug Bradley as the leader of the Cenobites. (Note: Later identified as "Pinhead" in the credits for the sequels beginning with Hellbound: Hellraiser II (1988), "The Hell Priest" in The Scarlet Gospels (2015), and "The Cold Man" in Hellraiser: The Toll (2018).)

Development of the film began before Barker's novella was published. Disappointed by previous adaptations of his work, Barker elected to direct himself, recruiting several actors and crew from his earlier career as a playwright. With the backing of independent producer Christopher Figg and financing from New World Pictures, filming took place in London in autumn 1986.

Hellraiser had its first public showing at the Prince Charles Cinema on 10 September 1987. It was widely released in the United Kingdom by Entertainment Film Distributors, and was a considerable commercial success, grossing $30 million from its $1 million production budget. Critical reception was initially divided, but the film has since been evaluated as a classic of the horror genre.

The film launched the Hellraiser franchise which includes nine sequels, the first seven of which feature Bradley reprising his role as Pinhead. A reboot, also titled Hellraiser and executive produced by Barker, was released in 2022.

== Plot ==
In Morocco, a hedonist named Frank Cotton buys a puzzle box said to open the door to a realm of otherworldly pleasure. At home in his bare attic, Frank solves the puzzle, and hooked chains emerge, tearing him apart.

Later, Frank's brother Larry moves into the same house. He intends to rebuild his relationship with his second wife, Julia, but is unaware that she had an affair with Frank before their marriage. When Larry accidentally cuts his hand moving furniture, his blood drips beneath the attic floor where Frank's organic remains lie undiscovered, which resurrects Frank in a ghoulish form. Julia later finds Frank; still obsessed with him, she agrees to help restore his body, so they can run away together. Julia picks up men in bars and brings them back to the attic, where she mortally wounds them. Frank then drains their life, which regenerates his body. Frank explains to Julia that, having exhausted all sensory experiences, he sought out the puzzle box, which was supposed to provide access to a realm of new carnal pleasures. When the puzzle was solved, the "Cenobites" came to subject him to extreme sadomasochism.

Kirsty, Larry's teenage daughter and Frank's niece, sees Julia bringing a man to the house and follows her to the attic, where she finds Frank. She evades Frank and escapes with the puzzle box, collapsing shortly thereafter. Awakening in a hospital, Kirsty opens the box out of curiosity, unknowingly summoning the Cenobites and a monster called the Engineer, from which she narrowly escapes. The Cenobites' leader Pinhead explains that, although they have been perceived as both angels and demons, they are simply "explorers" from another dimension seeking carnal experiences and can no longer distinguish between pain and pleasure. When they attempt to force Kirsty to return to their realm, she informs Pinhead that Frank has escaped. The Cenobites agree to spare Kirsty and recapture Frank instead, with the condition that Frank must confess to escaping them.

Kirsty returns home, where Frank has killed Larry and has taken on his identity by wearing his skin. Julia shows her what is purported to be Frank's flayed corpse in the attic. Julia then leaves the attic, locking the door behind her. The Cenobites appear and, not fooled by the deception, demand the name of the man who "did this". Kirsty tries to escape, but is held by Julia and Frank. Frank reveals his true identity to Kirsty and, when his sexual advances are rejected, he decides to kill her to complete his rejuvenation. He accidentally stabs Julia instead and drains her without remorse. Frank chases Kirsty to the attic and, when he is about to kill her, the Cenobites appear after hearing him confess to killing her father. Now, certain he is the one they are looking for, they ensnare him with chains with hooks and tear him to pieces. When the Cenobites double-cross Kirsty and attempt to take her, she grabs the puzzle box from Julia's dead hands and frantically tries to reverse it. Pinhead is unable to stop her in time, and she solves it, sending him and the Cenobites back to Hell.

Afterward, Kirsty throws the puzzle box onto a burning pyre. A vagrant who has been stalking Kirsty walks into the fire, retrieves the box, then transforms into a winged skeletal creature and flies away. The box ends up with the same merchant who sold it to Frank, where he offers it to another customer.

== Cast ==
- Andrew Robinson as Larry Cotton
- Clare Higgins as Julia Cotton
- Sean Chapman as Frank Cotton
- Robert Hines as Steve
- Ashley Laurence as Kirsty Cotton
- Oliver Smith as Frank The Monster
- Anthony Allen as 1st Victim
- Leon Devis as 2nd Victim
- Michael Cassidy as 3rd Victim
- Frank Baker as Derelict
- Kenneth Nelson as Bill
- Gay Baynes as Evelyn
- Niall Buggy as Dinner Guest
- Dave Atkins as Moving Man 1
- Oliver Parker as Moving Man 2
- Pamela Sholto as Complaining Customer
- Doug Bradley as Lead Cenobite
- Nicholas Vince as Chattering Cenobite
- Simon Bamford as 'Butterball' Cenobite
- Grace Kirby as Female Cenobite
- Sharon Bower as Nurse
- Raul Newney as Doctor

== Production ==
Having been dismayed at prior cinematic adaptations of his work, Barker, who had experience from writing, directing and starring in plays and had made two short films, decided to attempt to direct a film himself. He asked Christopher Figg, who became his producer, how small the budget would have to be for someone being willing to hire him as a first time director. Figg said the budget had to be less than a million dollars, which could be done if the film was just about a house and some monsters, and if he used more or less unknown actors. Barker decided to adapt The Hellbound Heart, as the story fit those parameters. New World Pictures agreed to fund the film for $900,000.

Hellraiser was filmed at the end of 1986 and was set to be made in seven weeks, but was extended over a nine- to ten-week period by New World. The film was originally made under the working title of Sadomasochists from Beyond the Grave. Barker also wanted to call the film Hellbound but producer Christopher Figg suggested Hellraiser instead. Barker spoke fondly in The Hellraiser Chronicles about the filming, stating that his memories of production were of "unalloyed fondness ... The cast treated my ineptitudes kindly, and the crew were no less forgiving". Barker admitted his own lack of knowledge on filmmaking, stating that he "didn't know the difference between a 10-millimetre lens and a 35-millimetre lens. If you'd shown me a plate of spaghetti and said that was a lens, I might have believed you". After filming, New World convinced Barker to relocate the story to the United States which required overdubbing to remove some English accents.

During production, Doug Bradley had trouble hitting his marks during his takes in make-up as he could not see through his black contact lenses and was afraid of tripping over Pinhead's skirts. The special effects of the unnamed creature, known as "The Engineer" in the novels, proved challenging as the creature was difficult to maneuver. Other issues included a rushed shoot of the Chinese restaurant scene with Kirsty and Larry, due to the lateness of the person responsible for letting the cast and crew into the establishment. Numerous props of the puzzle box, the Lament Configuration, which were constructed from wood and cut-out brass, were produced by special effects designer and maker Simon Sayce; due to the box's delicate construction, Sayce would lie on the floor under the Cenobites during some takes in case it was dropped, to save himself the eight hours it took to create another. Barker drew inspiration for the Cenobites' appearance from underground S&M culture. He later recalled visiting the New York club Cellblock 28, where the austere atmosphere, body piercing and ritualised approach to pain influenced the design and demeanour of the Cenobites, particularly their leader.

About seven or eight weeks after principal photography had finished, the executive producers saw the footage and liked the film enough to invest more into it. Because of this, a few scenes were redone with a higher budget, like the scene near the end where Frank's body is ripped apart. To produce Frank's resurrection, effects like reverse motion were used to give his skeleton flesh and inner organs.

The film had two editors: Richard Marden and an uncredited Tony Randel.

== Censorship ==
Clive Barker had to make some cuts on the film after the MPAA originally gave it an X rating. Two and a half shots were excised from the first hammer murder, including a closeup of the hammer lodged in the victim's head. In the scene where Julia murders another man, the actor playing the victim felt that it made sense for him to do so naked. The nude murder scene was shot, but was ultimately replaced with a semi-clothed version. Close-ups of Kirsty sticking her hand into Frank's stomach, exposing his guts, a longer version of the scene where Frank is being torn into pieces, and the final shot where his head explodes were also cut.

In an interview for Samhain magazine in July 1987, Barker mentioned some problems that censors had with more erotic scenes in the film:

Well, we did have a slight problem with the eroticism. I shot a much hotter flashback sequence than they would allow us to cut in.... Mine was more explicit and less violent. They wanted to substitute one kind of undertow for another. I had a much more explicit sexual encounter between Frank and Julia, but they said no, let's take out the sodomy and put in the flick knife.

Barker also said that the seduction scene between Julia and Frank was initially a lot more explicit:

We did a version of this scene which had some spanking in it and the MPAA was not very appreciative of that. ... The MPAA told me I was allowed two consecutive buttock thrusts from Frank but three is deemed obscene!

== Soundtrack ==
Hellraiser

Film score by Christopher Young
- Released: 1987
- Length: 42:40
- Label: Silva Screen

Barker originally wanted the electronic music group Coil to perform the music for the film, but that notion was rejected by New World. Editor Tony Randel then suggested Christopher Young as a replacement for Coil for the film's score. Young had previously composed scores for other horror films such as the 1985 slasher A Nightmare on Elm Street 2: Freddy's Revenge and the 1986 Tobe Hooper film Invaders from Mars.

The score for Hellraiser was released in 1987. AllMusic stated that the score proved that Christopher Young "hadn't used up all of his ideas for the horror genre" and that Young had matched "Barker's stylish look with a gothic score that mixed in exciting synthesizer effects". The music that Coil had recorded as a demo for their version of the score was later released as The Unreleased Themes for Hellraiser.

== Release ==
Hellraiser had its first public showing at the Prince Charles Cinema on 10 September 1987. The film was released in the United States and Canada on 18 September.

Hellraiser was initially banned in Ontario by the Ontario Film and Video Review Board. By a 3–2 majority vote, the film was deemed "not approved in its entirety as it contravenes community standards". It was banned because of its "brutal, graphic violence with blood-letting throughout, horror, degradation and torture". In August 1987, Hellraiser was passed by the Ontario Film Review Board, but only after several cuts were made to the film. New World Mutual Pictures of Canada cut about 40 seconds to get the film passed with an R rating. Thirty-five seconds of an extended torture scene featuring hooks pulling apart a body and face were removed, as well as a scene of squirming rats nailed to a wall.

Hellraiser received a wide theatrical re-release in the United States on 5 and 6 February 2025, accompanied by featurette Under the Skin: Doug Bradley on Hellraiser.

For the film's 30th anniversary, a 35 mm screening was held at the Prince Charles Cinema in London on 25 September 2017, the venue where the film had received its first public screening in 1987.

=== Home media ===
In North America, Hellraiser has been released by Anchor Bay Entertainment three times, all of which are the original 93-minute version of the film (this is the only version to ever be released on DVD). The original DVD release was a "barebones" release and is now out of print. It was reissued in 2000 with a new 5.1 mix mastered in THX. Finally, it was packaged along with Hellbound: Hellraiser II in a Limited Edition tin case which included a 48-page colour booklet and a reproduction theatrical poster for both films. Anchor Bay released the film on Blu-ray in 2009. This version retains all of the special features found on the 20th anniversary special edition DVD. In 2011, the film was re-released on Blu-ray by Image Entertainment under the "Midnight Madness" series label. This version contains no special features. However, various Blu-ray releases have since emerged with a highly variable selection of special features, although most of these are recycled from previous DVD releases.

In October 2015, Arrow Films released the film on Blu-ray in the United Kingdom along with Hellbound: Hellraiser II and Hellraiser III: Hell on Earth in a Scarlet Box edition featuring new 2K restorations and extensive list of bonus features including feature-length documentaries on the first 2 films and a bonus disc containing additional content such as two short films by Clive Barker. The Scarlet Box is now out of print in the UK and replaced by a three-film edition of the set without the bonus disc.

A US version of the Scarlet Box (with the same material) was released by Arrow on 20 December 2016.

In October 2017, Arrow Video released a 30th-anniversary limited-edition Blu-ray SteelBook of Hellraiser. The edition used the 2K restoration approved by cinematographer Robin Vidgeon and featured newly commissioned artwork by Matt Ryan Tobin, alongside previously released commentaries, documentaries and archival material.

In October 2023, Arrow Films released Hellraiser as part of the limited-edition Hellraiser: Quartet of Torment set, alongside Hellbound: Hellraiser II, Hellraiser III: Hell on Earth and Hellraiser: Bloodline. Arrow produced new 4K restorations of all four films from their original camera negatives. The 4K UHD editions were presented in Dolby Vision, with the original stereo soundtrack and a 5.1 surround mix. The set was released in the United Kingdom on 23 October 2023. A North American edition of the 4K set followed in October 2024.

== Reception ==
=== Box-office ===
Hellraiser grossed $14,564,000 in the United States and Canada, £763,412 in the United Kingdom and $30 million worldwide.

The original Hellraiser made about £1.03 million in the UK in 1987. It opened at number 4, eventually climbed to number 3, and spent around 12 weeks on the chart.

=== Critical response ===
For contemporary reviews in the United Kingdom, Time Out London referred to the film as "Barker's dazzling debut" that "creates such an atmosphere of dread that the astonishing set-pieces simply detonate in a chain reaction of cumulative intensity" and concluded that the film was "a serious, intelligent and disturbing horror film". The Daily Telegraph stated that "Barker has achieved a fine degree of menace". Melody Maker described it as "the best horror film ever to be made in Britain". Kim Newman writing for the Monthly Film Bulletin noted that the most immediately striking aspect of the movie is its seriousness of tone in an era when horror films (the Nightmare on Elm Street or Evil Dead films in particular) tend to be broadly comic". Newman stated that the film "suffers from a few minor compromises: notably a decision made fairly late in shooting to change the specifically English setting for an ambiguous (and unbelievable) mid-Atlantic one". Newman also noted that the Cenobites were "well used suggestive figures" but "their monster companion is a more blunderingly obvious concession to the gross-out tastes of the teenage drive-in audience". Newman concluded that the film was "a return to the cutting edge of horror cinema" and that in more gruesome moments the film "is a reminder of the grand guignol intensity that has recently tended to disintegrate into lazy splatter". Q stated that "Hellraiser does have its share of problems: the re-dubbing of peripheral character with a mid-Atlantic twang, the relocation of the film in a geographical limbo [...] The film, however, cannot be faulted for the ambitiousness of its themes [...] Sadly the moral and emotional complexity that is the film's greatest strength is likely to be deemed its greatest weakness by an audience weaned on the misplaced jocularity of House or Fright Night".

In the United States, The New York Times stated that Barker cast "singularly uninteresting actors" while "the special effects aren't bad – only damp". The Washington Post referred to the film as a "dark, frequently disturbing and occasionally terrifying film" but also argued that "Barker's vision hasn't quite made the conversion from paper to celluloid [...] There are some weaknesses, particularly the framing of close-ups and the generic score, but there are some moments of genuinely inventive gore [...] the film falls apart at its climax, degenerating to a surprisingly lame ending full of special effects and triumphant good". Roger Ebert gave the film one-half of a star out of four and deemed it "as dreary a piece of goods as has masqueraded as horror in many a long, cold night. This is one of those movies you sit through with mounting dread, as the fear grows inside of you that it will indeed turn out to be feature length" and that "this is a movie without wit, style or reason, and the true horror is that actors were made to portray, and technicians to realize, its bankruptcy of imagination". Writing in The Atlanta Constitution and other Cox papers, Eleanor Ringel assessed: "Re-Animator and Evil Dead II demonstrated that films like this can be made with a bit of wit and style. Hellraiser, alas, buries itself in its own shoddy shock tactics. It's not scary or funny; it's just squishy." Trade magazine Variety stated that Hellraiser is "well made, well acted, and the visual effects are generally handled with skill".

On the review aggregator website Rotten Tomatoes, 72% of 57 critics' reviews are positive, with an average rating of 6.8/10. The website's consensus reads: "Elevated by writer-director Clive Barker's fiendishly unique vision, Hellraiser offers a disquieting – and sadistically smart – alternative to mindless gore." Metacritic, which uses a weighted average, assigned the film a score of 56 out of 100, based on 17 critics, indicating "mixed or average" reviews.

In the early 2010s, Time Out London conducted a poll with several authors, directors, actors and critics who have worked within the horror genre to vote for their top horror films. Hellraiser placed at number 80 on their top 100 list.

== Legacy ==
Hellraiser has subsequently been regarded as one of the defining horror films of the 1980s. The British Film Institute described Barker's debut as one of the decade's defining horror films and credited Doug Bradley's Lead Cenobite, later known as Pinhead, with becoming a "movie monster for the ages".

The film has influenced later horror filmmakers. Paul W. S. Anderson cited the work of Clive Barker as a major influence on Event Horizon (1997), specifically comparing its imagery of another dimension and the mutilated appearance of Sam Neill's character to the Cenobites.

The Cenobites' visual design also had a wider cultural influence. David Bruckner, director of the 2022 Hellraiser reimagining, stated that the original film's sadomasochistic imagery had been repeatedly absorbed into popular fashion and culture by the 21st century, contributing to his decision to redesign the Cenobites for the newer film.

In 2026, the survival horror video game Clive Barker's Hellraiser: Revival drew heavily on the original Hellraiser, alongside Hellbound: Hellraiser II and Barker's novella The Hellbound Heart. Narrative director Anthony de Fault said that the development team deliberately returned to those works as its principal source material while attempting to exclude other influences.

== Sequels and remake ==
Concept art by Gary Tunnicliffe for Pinhead from Patrick Lussier's defunct Hellraiser reboot. Several ideas and concepts were developed for the project, with William Fichtner at one point considered for the role of the Hell Priest.

Hellraiser was followed by nine sequels, the first seven of which featured Doug Bradley reprising his role as Pinhead. Clive Barker has stated that he signed away the story and character rights to the production company prior to the release of the first film, not realizing the critical and financial success it would be.

Plans for a Hellraiser remake were publicised in October 2007, when Alexandre Bustillo and Julien Maury were reported to be directing, with Barker producing and Marcus Dunstan and Patrick Melton writing the script. After Maury and Bustillo left the project, Todd Farmer and Patrick Lussier were attached, with production slated for an early 2012 release. However, following the release of Hellraiser: Revelations (2011) to secure continuing rights, Farmer and Lussier were no longer involved. By 2018, after the critical and commercial success of Halloween, Miramax Films had confirmed plans for new Hellraiser installments. The film was green-lit in early 2019, with David Bruckner directing from a script written by Ben Collins and Luke Piotrowski. It was released on Hulu in October 2022. A Hellraiser television series is in development at HBO.

== See also ==
- List of British films of 1987
- List of horror films of 1987

== Bibliography ==
- Kane, Paul (2015). The Hellraiser Films and Their Legacy. McFarland. ISBN 9781476600697.
