= 2022 Fangoria Chainsaw Awards =

Annual US horror film awards ceremony

28th Fangoria Chainsaw Awards
- Release poster
- Presented by: Fangoria
- Announced on: January 4, 2022
- Presented on: May 16, 2022
- Hosted by: David Dastmalchian

Highlights
- Most awards: Last Night in Soho (3)

The 28th Fangoria Chainsaw Awards was an award ceremony presented for horror films that were released in 2021. The nominees were announced on January 4, 2022.

== Winners and nominees ==
Best Wide Release	Best Limited Release
Malignant − Directed by James Wan; Candyman − Directed by Nia DaCosta; Last Night in Soho − Directed by Edgar Wright; The Night House − Directed by David Bruckner; A Quiet Place Part II − Directed by John Krasinski	PG: Psycho Goreman − Directed by Steven Kostanski; Come True − Directed by Anthony Scott Burns; Hurt − Directed by Sonny Mallhi; In the Earth − Directed by Ben Wheatley; Werewolves Within − Directed by Josh Ruben
Best International Movie	Best Streaming Premiere
Titane − Directed by Julia Ducournau (France); Detention − Directed by John Hsu (Taiwan); Lamb − Directed by Valdimar Jóhannsson (Iceland); The Queen of Black Magic − Directed by Kimo Stamboel (Indonesia); The Feast − Directed by Lee Haven Jones (UK)	Fear Street Part Three: 1666 − Directed by Leigh Janiak (Netflix); The Boy Behind the Door − Directed by Justin Powell and David Charbonier (Shudder); Lucky − Directed by Natasha Kermani (Shudder); The Power − Directed by Corinna Faith (Shudder); Violation − Directed by Dusty Mancinelli and Madeleine Sims-Fewer (Shudder)
Best Director	Best First Feature
Edgar Wright − Last Night in Soho; Prano Bailey-Bond − Censor; David Bruckner − The Night House; Anthony Scott Burns − Come True; Julia Ducournau − Titane; Rose Glass − Saint Maud	Saint Maud − Directed by Rose Glass; Censor − Directed by Prano Bailey-Bond; My Heart Can't Beat Unless You Tell It To − Directed by Jonathan Cuartas; The Stylist − Directed by Jill Gevargizian; The Vigil − Directed by Keith Thomas
Best Lead Performance	Best Supporting Performance
Yahya Abdul-Mateen II − Candyman as Anthony McCoy; Niamh Algar − Censor as Enid Baines; Morfydd Clark − Saint Maud as Katie/Maud; Barbara Crampton − Jakob's Wife as Anne Fedder; Rebecca Hall − The Night House as Beth Parchin; Thomasin McKenzie − Last Night in Soho as Eloise "Ellie" Turner; Agathe Rousselle − Titane as Alexia/Adrien; Madeleine Sims-Fewer − Violation as Miriam; Julia Sarah Stone − Come True as Sarah; Anya Taylor-Joy − Last Night in Soho as Alexandra "Sandie" Collins	Millicent Simmonds − A Quiet Place Part II as Regan Abbott; Luke David Blumm − Son as David; Jennifer Ehle − Saint Maud as Amanda Köhl; Larry Fessenden − Jakob's Wife as Pastor Jakob Fedder; Vincent Lindon − Titane as Vincent; Diana Rigg − Last Night in Soho as Ms. Collins; Bill Sage − Wrong Turn as Venable/Ram Skull; Jeremy T. Thomas − Antlers as Lucas Weaver; Suzanne Voss − Dementia Part II as Suzanne Goldblum
Best Screenplay	Best Score
The Night House − Ben Collins and Luke Piotrowski; Censor − Prano Bailey-Bond and Anthony Fletcher; Detention − John Hsu, Fu Kai-ling, and Chien Shih-keng; Saint Maud − Rose Glass; Violation − Madeleine Sims-Fewer and Dusty Mancinelli	Halloween Kills − John Carpenter, Cody Carpenter, and Daniel Davies; Come True − Electric Youth and Pilotpriest; Hurt − Tom Schraeder and CJ Johnson; In the Earth − Clint Mansell; The Night House − Ben Lovett
Best Make-Up FX	Best Creature FX
Halloween Kills − Christopher Nelson; Blood Red Sky − Mark Coulier; Hurt − Tara Brawley; Kandisha − Oriane de Neve/CLSFX Atelier 69; Spiral: From the Book of Saw − Francois Dagenais	PG: Psycho Goreman − Steven Kostanski/MastersFX; Antlers − Shane Mahan/Legacy Effects; Black Friday − Robert Kurtzman; The Green Knight − Barrie Gower; V/H/S/94 − Magee FX/Gaslight Studio
Best Costume Design	Best Documentary
Last Night in Soho − Odile Dicks-Mireaux; Bingo Hell − Eulyn Colette Hufkie; Candyman − Lizzie Cook; Prisoners of the Ghostland − Chieko Matsumoto; Slumber Party Massacre − Neil McClean	Woodlands Dark and Days Bewitched − Directed by Kier-La Janisse; Mail Order Murder − Directed by William Hellfire and Ross Snyder; Dark Shadows and Beyond: The Jonathan Frid Story − Directed by Mary O'Leary
Best Series	Best Non-Fiction Series or Miniseries
Midnight Mass (Netflix); Brand New Cherry Flavor (Netflix); Chucky (Syfy); Creepshow (Shudder); I Know What You Did Last Summer (Prime Video)	The Last Drive-in with Joe Bob Briggs (Shudder); Elvira's 40th Anniversary, Very Scary, Very Special, Special (Shudder); The Boulet Brothers' Dragula (Shudder)
Best Kill
The Bread Slicer – Fear Street Part One: 1994

== Presenters ==
- Harry Manfredini — presented Best Score
- Tiffany Shepis and Joe Lo Truglio — presented Best Supporting Performance
- Michael Varrati and Peaches Christ — presented Best First Feature
- Jim Cummings — presented Best Creature FX
- Diana Prince — presented Best Streaming Premiere
- Elric Kane and Rebekah McKendry — presented Best Non-Fiction Series or Miniseries
- The Boulet Brothers — presented Best Make-Up FX
- Harvey Guillén and Josh Ruben — presented Best Screenplay
- Misha Osherovich and Rachel True — presented Best Creature FX
- Alejandro Brugués — presented Best International Movie
- Tananarive Due and Bryan Fuller — presented Best Series
- Brea Grant — presented In Memorian
- Tracie Thoms — presented Best Limited Release
- Jeff Daniel Phillips and Daniel Roebuck — presented Best Lead Performance
- Dee Wallace and Joe Dante — presented Best Director
- Felissa Rose — presented Best Kill
- Chad Villella, Matt Bettinelli-Olpin and Tyler Gillett — presented Best Wide Release
