= Nate Matteson =

American producer and television producer

- Born: 1983 (age 42–43); United States
- Occupations: Film producer; Television producer; Talent Manager
- Years active: 2005–present

Nate Matteson is an American talent manager, film producer, and television producer. He is known for representing and collaborating with film and television writers, directors, actors, and producers. He is also known for his work as an Executive Producer on the series Station Eleven, The Bear, and Mr. & Mrs. Smith.

Matteson received a nomination for Outstanding Drama Series at the 2024 Emmy Awards as an Executive Producer of Mr. & Mrs. Smith.

== Early life ==
Matteson grew up in Wisconsin and began his career as a production assistant in feature films and television.

== Career ==
Matteson began his career in the entertainment industry as an agent trainee at Paradigm. He later joined the Gotham Group, where he spent eight years. During his tenure at the Gotham Group, he represented filmmakers and television creators Hiro Murai, Lee Sung Jin, David Bruckner, Craig William Macneill, Kevin Phillips, producers Ashley Lyle and Bart Nickerson, and screenwriters Ben Collins and Luke Piotrowski.

In August 2017, Matteson joined Grandview as a literary manager, with several of his clients also moving to the company. In 2018, he was profiled as one of Variety's "New Leaders: Agents and Managers" in the entertainment industry.

In January 2019, Matteson transitioned from management to creative producing. He partnered with Hiro Murai to launch a film and television production venture aimed at emerging filmmakers. Matteson and Murai first began working together 2012, when Matteson started managing Murai when he was creating music videos. Matteson helped Murai transition into television, where Murai became known for his work on Atlanta.

In July 2019, Matteson entered into a non-exclusive two-year development and production agreement with Makeready via Super Frog, the production company he co-founded with Murai. The deal provided financing support for feature-focused projects and works across multiple formats. In July 2020, it was announced that Matteson and Super Frog entered into a first-look development deal with FX Productions. Under the agreement, he worked on developing scripted and unscripted programming for FX and other divisions of Walt Disney Television.

In 2021, Matteson was an executive producer on the limited series Station Eleven. He was involved in the project during its early development stages alongside Murai and creator Patrick Somerville. In the same year, Matteson was announced as an executive producer on the pilot for The Bear, when FX Productions ordered the project, overseeing the show into its series order in 2022.

In March 2023, it was announced that Matteson and Murai amicably ended their producing partnership. Later that year, Matteson joined Closer Media as an executive, where he oversees the development of scripted television projects. Matteson is an executive producer on the Amazon series Mr. & Mrs. Smith and producer on the feature film She Rides Shotgun.

== Filmography ==
=== Film ===
| Year | Title | Role | Notes |
|---|---|---|---|
| 2025 | She Rides Shotgun | Producer | Crime thriller |
| 2017 | Stephanie | Executive producer | Horror |

=== Television ===
| Year(s) | Title | Role | Notes |
|---|---|---|---|
| 2024 | Mr. & Mrs. Smith | Executive producer | 8 episodes |
| 2022 | The Bear | Executive producer | Season 1 |
| 2021–2022 | Station Eleven | Executive producer | 10 episodes |
| 2022 | Iowa | Executive producer | Pilot episode |
| 2021 | The Choe Show | Executive producer | |

== Awards and nominations ==
| Organizations | Year | Category | Work | Result | Ref. |
|---|---|---|---|---|---|
| Gotham Awards | 2022 | Breakthrough Series | Station Eleven | Nominated | |
| Gotham Awards | 2023 | Breakthrough Series | Mr. & Mr. Smith | Won | |
| Independent Spirit Awards | 2021 | Best New Non-Scripted or Documentary Series | The Choe Show | Nominated | |
| Independent Spirit Awards | 2022 | Best New Scripted Series | The Bear | Won | |
| Independent Spirit Awards | 2022 | Best New Scripted Series | Station Eleven | Nominated | |
| Primetime Emmy Awards | 2024 | Outstanding Drama Series | Mr. & Mrs. Smith | Nominated | |
