= Max Talisman =

American actor, writer, and director

- Born: June 14, 1993 (age 33); Bethesda, Maryland, U.S.
- Occupations: Actor, screenwriter, director, producer
- Years active: 2006–present

Max Talisman (born June 14, 1993) is an American actor, screenwriter, director, and producer. He wrote, directed, and starred in the 2025 romantic comedy Things Like This, and is the creator and star of the independent television series The Right Side, opposite Andie MacDowell, Peter Gallagher, and Elizabeth Gillies.

== Early life ==
Talisman was born and raised in Bethesda, Maryland, a suburb of Washington, D.C. His father, Jonathan Talisman, served as Assistant Secretary of the Treasury for Tax Policy under President Bill Clinton. He has two siblings.

Talisman has said he decided to become a performer at age three after seeing Cats at the National Theatre. He trained at the Musical Theater Center in the Washington area and appeared in student productions while attending Green Acres School in Rockville, Maryland. In 2006, at ages 12 and 13, he played Noah Gellman in the Studio Theatre's production of Caroline, or Change, the musical's Washington, D.C. premiere, which was extended twice and went on to win a Helen Hayes Award. In 2009 he played Arty in Theater J's production of Neil Simon's Lost in Yonkers opposite Holly Twyford, his first non-singing stage role. He later studied acting at Syracuse University before moving to New York City.

== Career ==
Talisman acted in the film Super Dark Times alongside Owen Campbell, Charlie Tahan, Elizabeth Cappuccino, Sawyer Barth, and Amy Hargreaves. The film was directed by Kevin Phillips and written by Luke Piotrowski and Ben Collins. Super Dark Times premiered at the Tribeca Film Festival of 2017.

As an actor Talisman made a guest appearance on the TV series Orange Is the New Black and he played two different roles in The Blacklist.

He also appeared in the HBO Max series Search Party.

Talisman founded the production company Malibu, Bro Productions, whose first release was Things Like This, a 2025 romantic comedy about two men with the same name who fall in love in New York City. The film, his feature directorial and screenwriting debut, was shot in New York City over 18 days and produced by Talisman with Buzz Koenig and Danny Chavarriaga. Talisman stars alongside a cast that includes Joey Pollari, Jackie Cruz, Charlie Tahan, Cara Buono, Nicholas Hamilton, Bridget Regan, and Eric Roberts. MPX acquired worldwide sales rights in 2023, and the film was released theatrically in the United States on May 16, 2025, as the first title from MPX Releasing.

In 2026, he created the television series The Right Side, an independently produced American comedy series shooting in New York, with Atlantic Pictures' Buzz Koenig producing. The series stars Andie MacDowell, Peter Gallagher, Elizabeth Gillies, and Dyllón Burnside opposite Talisman, with MacDowell and Gallagher as a conservative morning-show couple and Talisman and Gillies as their liberal twin children. The series is described as a character-driven comedy examining politics as performance and the challenge of loving people whose beliefs fundamentally oppose one another.

== Personal life ==
Talisman is openly gay and frequently discusses the influence of his identity on his creative work. He has spoken about his experiences as a queer man and a plus-size actor shaping his storytelling perspective, particularly in his debut feature film Things Like This, which he wrote to portray queer love and relationships outside of traditional coming-out narratives.

Talisman has also discussed his personal motivation to create more inclusive romantic comedies that reflect body diversity and queer experiences.

Talisman has also shared personal interests in interviews, noting his admiration for tennis player Serena Williams and his appreciation for the Batman franchise, which he has described as influential to his love of storytelling and genre entertainment.

Talisman is Jewish. He has described his family as supportive of his career, and came out as gay shortly after starting college.
