= Hellraiser (2022 film) =

Film directed by David Bruckner

- Promotional release poster
- Directed by: David Bruckner
- Screenplay by: Ben Collins; Luke Piotrowski
- Story by: David S. Goyer; Ben Collins; Luke Piotrowski
- Based on: The Hellbound Heart by Clive Barker
- Produced by: David S. Goyer; Keith Levine; Clive Barker; Marc Toberoff
- Starring: Odessa A'zion; Jamie Clayton; Adam Faison; Drew Starkey; Brandon Flynn; Aoife Hinds; Jason Liles; Yinka Olorunnife; Selina Lo; Zachary Hing; Kit Clarke; Goran Višnjić; Hiam Abbass
- Cinematography: Eli Born
- Edited by: David Marks
- Music by: Ben Lovett
- Production companies: 20th Century Studios (Note: This film was originally in-production at 20th Century Studios, but the studio went uncredited upon release of the film. Despite this, 20th Century Studios promoted the film instead.); Spyglass Media Group; Phantom Four Films; 247Hub
- Distributed by: Hulu (United States); Paramount Pictures (International)
- Release dates: September 28, 2022 (Fantastic Fest); October 7, 2022 (United States)
- Running time: 121 minutes
- Countries: United States; Serbia
- Language: English
- Budget: $14 million
- Box office: $12,640

Hellraiser is a 2022 supernatural horror film directed by David Bruckner, with a screenplay by Ben Collins and Luke Piotrowski, from a screen story co-written with David S. Goyer. It is the eleventh film in the Hellraiser franchise, based on the 1986 novella The Hellbound Heart by Clive Barker. The film stars Odessa A'zion as a young woman recovering from addiction who ends up with a mechanical puzzle box that can summon the Cenobites, a group of sadomasochistic humanoid beings who thrive on pain being pleasure. Jamie Clayton, Adam Faison, Drew Starkey, Brandon Flynn, Aoife Hinds, Jason Liles, Yinka Olorunnife, Selina Lo, Zachary Hing, Kit Clarke, Goran Višnjić, and Hiam Abbass appear in supporting roles.

Plans for a Hellraiser remake were publicized in October 2007, when Julien Maury and Alexandre Bustillo were reported to be directing, with Barker producing and Marcus Dunstan and Patrick Melton writing the script. After Maury and Bustillo left the project, Todd Farmer and Patrick Lussier were attached, with production slated for an early 2012 release. However, following the release of Hellraiser: Revelations (2011) to secure continuing rights, Farmer and Lussier were no longer involved. By 2018, after the critical and commercial success of Halloween, Miramax had confirmed plans for new Hellraiser installments. The film was green-lit in early 2019, with Bruckner directing from a script written by Collins and Piotrowski, while the project moved to Hulu with Spyglass Media Group and Phantom Four Films. Filming took place from September to October 2021.

The film was released in 2022, first during Fantastic Fest then throughout North America via Hulu, and finally throughout the United Kingdom and globally via Spyglass and Paramount Pictures. The film received mixed reviews from critics.

== Plot ==
While hosting a lavish orgy at his mansion, hedonistic millionaire investor, art collector and socialite Roland Voight invites sex worker Joey Coscuna to solve a mysterious mechanical puzzle box, which then springs a blade that cuts Joey and opens a portal to another dimension, from which chains fly out and rip him apart.

Six years later, recovering drug addict Riley McKendry lives with her estranged brother Matt, his boyfriend Colin, and their roommate Nora. Riley and her boyfriend Trevor discover the puzzle box in an abandoned storage warehouse. Returning home late, Riley storms out following an argument with Matt after he accuses her of relapsing. At an empty park, she solves the puzzle but misses being cut by the blade. The Cenobites, a group of mutilated humanoids, appear and demand another sacrifice. Matt, feeling guilty about his strained relationship with Riley, finds her incapacitated and inadvertently cuts himself on the box while attempting to awaken her. He enters a nearby restroom to clean his wound but then experiences a headache. Outside, Riley notices the box changing shapes before she hears Matt screaming, finding him missing upon entering the bathroom.

Believing the box caused Matt's disappearance, Riley and Trevor track down Voight's former lawyer Serena Menaker at an assisted living facility. Having concealed it in the warehouse, Menaker attempts to confiscate the box from Riley but is cut by the blade and later abducted by the Cenobites. Visiting Voight's abandoned mansion, Riley discovers from his journals that each of the box's six configurations require a victim to be marked for sacrifice by its blade. On completion, the holder receives a "gift" from Leviathan, the entity that rules over Hell. Riley sees an apparition of Matt and is horrified to discover he has been flayed.

Colin, Trevor, and Nora arrive in Trevor's van to take Riley home. While Riley explains her findings to Colin, Nora hits a switch in the bar that opens a secret passage. Trevor inadvertently shuts the door, trapping her inside the passage, and as he attempts to rescue her, the mutilated Voight, concealed inside the walls, stabs her with the box. The group escapes the mansion to seek help, but the Cenobites abduct Nora, who is taunted, tortured, and fatally flayed in a decrepit hallway by their leader, the Priest. The van crashes after Riley sees a reflection of Nora's torture in the rearview mirror, whereupon the Priest appears. After Riley refuses the Priest's offer to exchange Matt for two sacrifices, she is ordered to sacrifice either two people or herself. After a Cenobite known as the Chatterer injures Trevor, Riley solves the next configuration and stabs the Chatterer, who is ripped apart as the next sacrifice.

The trio retreats to the mansion, realizing the steel doors will bar the Cenobites from entering. Leaving Trevor to rest, Riley and Colin plan to trap a Cenobite known as the Asphyx as the last sacrifice, but she drops the box. Voight appears, picks it up, and stabs Colin, revealing that he sought "sensation" after completing all of his sacrifices, but instead, a contraption was attached to him that randomly twists his nerve endings. He privately speaks with Trevor, revealing he employed him to locate suitable humans, then completes the final configuration and traps the Cenobites, demanding they ask Leviathan to free him. While Leviathan appears above the mansion, Riley retrieves the box, unlocks the steel doors, and rescues Colin from torture by stabbing Trevor, marking him as the final sacrifice. Meanwhile, the Priest warns Voight that his reward can only be exchanged and not revoked; he accepts the offer of "power" and is released from his contraption and healed, only for Leviathan to immediately impale him with a large chain and lift him away.

With the sacrifices completed, the Cenobites offer to resurrect Matt. Riley declines, realizing their gifts will bring pain, and decides to accept Matt's death. After the Cenobites accept her choice of the Lament Configuration, a life of regret with bitter and brief suffering, they vanish and the box resumes its cube configuration. As the duo leaves the mansion, Colin asks a silent Riley if her choice was justified; meanwhile, inside Leviathan's realm, Voight is brutally transformed into a new Cenobite.

== Cast ==
- Odessa A'zion as Riley McKendry, a recovering drug addict
- Jamie Clayton as the Priest, leader of the Cenobites
- Adam Faison as Colin, Matt's boyfriend
- Drew Starkey as Trevor, Riley's boyfriend who met her in a twelve-step program
- Brandon Flynn as Matthew "Matt" McKendry, Riley's estranged brother
- Aoife Hinds as Nora, Matt and Colin's roommate
- Jason Liles as the Chatterer, a Cenobite who chases Riley, Trevor, and Colin
- Yinka Olorunnife as the Weeper, a Cenobite who bleeds from her eyes
- Selina Lo as the Gasp, a Cenobite and Pinhead's assistant whose deformation hinders her breathing
- Zachary Hing as the Asphyx, a Cenobite with a sheet of flesh fastened over the face that prevents respiration and arms bound by wires in a praying position
- Kit Clarke as Joseph "Joey" Coscuna, a sex worker and one of Voight's victims
- Goran Višnjić as Roland Voight, a hedonistic millionaire and businessman who serves the Cenobites and Leviathan and later becomes an angelic-like Cenobite
- Hiam Abbass as Serena Menaker, Voight's lawyer
- Gorica Regodić as the Mother, a visibly pregnant Cenobite
- Vukašin Jovanović as the Masque, a headless Cenobite with the flesh of its face held in place by a metal frame

== Production ==
=== Development ===
In October 2006, Clive Barker announced through his official website that he would be writing the script to a forthcoming remake of the original Hellraiser film, to be produced by Dimension Films. In October 2007, Julien Maury and Alexandre Bustillo were eyed to write and direct. Dimension was hoping to rush the film into production before the potential strikes expected by the end of the year. A release date of September 5, 2008 was planned by the studio. By January 2008, the project, then titled Clive Barker Presents: Hellraiser, was delayed to January 9, 2009 following the studio's dissatisfaction with Maury and Bustillo's script. In February 2008, Marcus Dunstan and Patrick Melton were tapped for a page-one rewrite, and production was gearing up to begin that spring. By April 2008, the directing pair had vacated Hellraiser and moved onto Halloween II after clashing with producer Bob Weinstein, who wanted a film with a wider appeal for mass audiences. Darren Lynn Bousman was offered the film, but his commitments to other projects likely prevented him from accepting. That October, French director Pascal Laugier was set to direct. The film was pulled from its January release date in December 2008. Laugier told Dread Central in March 2009 that work on the film had begun with a co-writer he could not publicly name. Laugier envisioned a much more serious tone for the film than the producers had hoped; who pushed for a commercial film that would appeal to a teen audience, and he left the project in June 2009. By October, reports indicated that the film would be released in 3D.

Throughout 2010, further pitches were given by Christian E. Christiansen, Cory Goodman, and from writing duo Josh Stolberg and Peter Goldfinger. By August, the reboot had taken a back seat at Dimension Films, as production commenced on Hellraiser: Revelations; greenlit primarily to retain the rights to the property. In October 2010, Christiansen was reported to be in the running for director while Amber Heard was considered for the lead role. Mere days later, it was officially announced that Patrick Lussier and Todd Farmer were to direct and write, respectively, a reboot of the Hellraiser franchise. The story would have differed from the original film, as Lussier and Farmer did not want to retell the original story out of respect for Barker's work, instead focusing on the world and function of the puzzle box. During their tenure on the project, Lussier and Farmer had worked out numerous ideas beyond a simple reboot. One idea was a prequel starring William Fichtner as Pinhead, while another pitch had Pinhead portrayed by a woman. However, in 2011, Farmer confirmed that both he and Lussier were dropped from the project.

In October 2013, Barker announced that he would be directing and writing the film, and Doug Bradley was to return in his role as Pinhead. A year later, Barker stated that a second draft of the script was completed and described the film as a "very loose" remake of the original film, but said that he may not direct the film. In March 2017, Barker said that the film's "script was written and delivered to Dimension years ago. That was the last anyone heard until news of a sequel surfaced." After the successful release of the 2018 horror sequel Halloween, Miramax confirmed that it was considering beginning production on new installments to the Hellraiser franchise.

In May 2019, Gary Barber announced that Spyglass Media Group would be developing a new remake of Hellraiser to be written and co-produced by David S. Goyer. In April 2020, David Bruckner was set to direct the remake, with Ben Collins and Luke Piotrowski writing the script after having previously collaborated with Bruckner on The Night House (2020), which Goyer also produced. In December 2020, following a legal dispute, Barker officially regained the rights to the property in the United States.

=== Pre-production ===
In June 2021, it was reported that Odessa A'zion was cast in the lead role. In a July 2021 interview with Entertainment Weekly, it was revealed that the film's producers auditioned drag performer Gottmik for the role of Pinhead, after Gottmik showcased a Pinhead-inspired look for RuPaul's Drag Race.

=== Filming ===
In September 2021, Goyer announced that the production crew was "in the midst of" filming, confirming that principal photography had commenced in Belgrade, Serbia. In October 2021, after filming wrapped, Jamie Clayton was revealed to have portrayed Pinhead, while Brandon Flynn, Goran Višnjić, Drew Starkey, Adam Faison, Aoife Hinds, Selina Lo and Hiam Abbass were unveiled as supporting cast. Bruckner and the crew reached out to Bradley to make a cameo appearance in the film, but Bradley declined due to potential complications with the ongoing COVID-19 pandemic and his desire to leave his Pinhead performance's legacy intact, the latter of which Bruckner and his crew accepted.

== Release ==
=== United States ===
On 28 September 2022, Hellraiser had its world premiere at Fantastic Fest in Austin, Texas as one of that film festival's "secret screenings". On 4 October 2022, it was screened at "Beyond Fest" in Santa Monica, California. The film was released in the United States by Hulu via streaming on 7 October 2022, exclusively on its service as a Hulu Original.

=== International ===
On 5 October 2022, David Bruckner announced, on Twitter, that Spyglass and Paramount Pictures were handling international distribution for the film. On 31 October 2022, Paramount announced, via Twitter, the release of the film in the United Kingdom through various streaming services, including Amazon Prime Video, iTunes, and Microsoft, as part of its international release.

=== Home media ===
Hellraiser was released on DVD by Paramount Home Entertainment in the United Kingdom on 27 March 2023.

== Reception ==
=== Audience viewership ===
According to Whip Media's TV Time, Hellraiser was the third most streamed film in the United States during the week of October 9, 2022. According to the streaming aggregator Reelgood, Hellraiser was the eighth most watched program across all platforms during the week of October 14, and the 9th during the week of October 19, 2022. According to the streaming aggregator JustWatch, Hellraiser was the most watched movie across all platforms in the United States during the week of October 3, and during the week of October 10, 2022.

=== Critical response ===
On the review aggregator website Rotten Tomatoes, 68% of 148 critics' reviews are positive, with an average rating of 6.3/10. The website's consensus reads: "A gift for long-suffering fans after numerous subpar sequels, David Bruckner's Hellraiser unlocks the puzzle box for getting this franchise back on the right track." Metacritic, which uses a weighted average, assigned the film a score of 55 out of 100, based on 25 critics, indicating "mixed or average" reviews.

Katie Rife of Polygon criticized the characters and the length, but praised the set design and Clayton's performance, and felt overall the film "might even be the second best in the series after Hellbound: Hellraiser II". Dave White of TheWrap wrote, "Embodying Clive Barker's original intention of 'repulsive glamour', these Cenobites silently glide on hell's runway. The assignment was 'red flesh and raw meat, but make it fashion', and their work is an elegant slam dunk." Mark Hanson of Slant Magazine called it "a toothlessly retrograde enterprise."

=== Accolades ===
Year	Award	Category	Nominee(s)	Result	Ref.
2023	Fangoria Chainsaw Awards	Best Streaming Premiere Film	Hellraiser	Nominated	
2023	Fangoria Chainsaw Awards	Best Supporting Performance	Jamie Clayton	Nominated	
2023	Fangoria Chainsaw Awards	Best Makeup FX	Josh Russell, Sierra Russell	Nominated	

== Future ==
In October 2023, Bruckner expressed interest in developing a sequel contingent upon the perceived success of the 2022 installment, and the collective interest of the audience. In March 2024, producer Keith Levine confirmed that there are developments in collaboration with Bruckner for a sequel.
