= Crush (2013 film) =

Film by Malik Bader

- DVD cover
- Directed by: Malik Bader
- Written by: Sonny Mallhi
- Produced by: Trevor Macy; Marc D. Evans; Sonny Mallhi
- Starring: Lucas Till; Crystal Reed; Sarah Bolger; Caitríona Balfe; Reid Ewing; Leigh Whannell
- Cinematography: Scott Kevan
- Edited by: Jeff W. Canavan
- Music by: Julian Boyd
- Production company: Intrepid Pictures
- Distributed by: Millennium Entertainment
- Release date: April 9, 2013
- Running time: 94 minutes
- Country: United States
- Language: English
- Box office: $105,473

Crush is a 2013 American direct-to-video thriller film directed by Malik Bader and written by Sonny Mallhi. Starring Lucas Till, Crystal Reed, and Sarah Bolger, it follows a popular high school student (Till) who finds himself being stalked.

The film was released on DVD, Blu-ray, and video on demand in the United States on April 9, 2013, by Millennium Entertainment.

== Plot ==
High school student Scott gains popularity among his classmates for his prowess on the soccer field, which he seeks to turn into an athletic scholarship. Although he possesses artistic talent, Scott continues to focus on soccer, even after a leg injury threatens to jeopardize his playing days. His best friend Jules harbors romantic feelings for him, but Scott resists her advances to prevent ruining their friendship. Also romantically interested in Scott is Bess, a shy student who recognizes his artistic abilities. Bess herself becomes a love interest of her classmate Jeffrey, although she does not return his feelings as she develops an unhealthy obsession with Scott.

An unknown stalker emerges in Scott's life, who begins demonstrating disturbing behavior. The stalker's actions turn violent when Mrs. Brown, a teacher who flirted with Scott, is attacked and seriously injured, while Jules is nearly killed by the stalker during a party. Scott suspects Bess is responsible, aware of her feelings for him, but recognizes that he cannot prove that she is his stalker. Later, while driving, Scott accidentally hits Bess' co-worker Andie and offers to take her home upon noticing that she sustained a leg injury. However, Andie knocks Scott out when he enters her house, revealing herself as the stalker, before trapping him in her basement.

Scott attempts to escape after he awakens, but Andie agitates his leg injury. After Andie kills her boss David when he arrives at the house, Scott makes another escape attempt and manages to crawl out of the basement, despite sustaining further leg injuries. Bess visits the house soon afterwards, where she discovers Scott, as well as David's body, prompting Andie to attack her. Although Andie gets the upper hand, Jeffrey shows up to help overpower her and Scott kicks Andie into the basement, knocking her out.

Unable to play soccer because of his injuries, Scott begins to work on applying for art school while he enters into a relationship with Jules. Bess and Jeffrey also begin their own relationship. Andie is visited by her attorney Mr. Graham, to whom she admits her killings began at an early age and warns that she will not remain in custody for long.

== Cast ==
- Lucas Till as Scott
- Crystal Reed as Bess
- Sarah Bolger as Jules
- Caitríona Balfe as Andie
  - Ashleigh Craig as Young Andie
- Reid Ewing as Jeffrey
- Leigh Whannell as David
- Holt McCallany as Mike
- Derrick Kemp as Brock
- Camille Guaty as Mrs. Brown
- Michael Landes as Mr. Graham
- Isaiah Mustafa as Coach Evans

Additionally, Meredith Salenger appears as Bess' mother and Nikki SooHoo appears as Maya. Cody Hamilton portrays the boy killed by Andie at the beginning of the film.

== Critical reception ==
Writing for Fearnet, Scott Weinberg praised the acting of the three leads but criticized the film's "paper-thin premise" and script for being derivative (pointing out Mallhi's previous work on 2011's The Roommate), and said "Even putting aside the casual plagiarism in Mallhi's screenplays, there's nothing here in the way of character, suspense, intensity, or surprises. It's just someone telling the same old story with slightly different character."

On Bloody Disgusting, Paul Lê wrote that "Crush is more perceptive than its familiar pitch might suggest." On DVD Talk, William Harrison wrote that "Crush turns out to be an entertaining thriller with solid direction and good acting."
