= The Long Call =

British crime drama

- Based on: The Long Call by Ann Cleeves
- Developed by: Kelly Jones
- Directed by: Lee Haven Jones
- Starring: Ben Aldridge; Pearl Mackie
- Music by: Samuel Sim
- Original language: English
- No. of seasons: 1
- No. of episodes: 4

Production
- Executive producers: Kelly Jones; Kate Bartlett
- Producer: Angie Daniell
- Cinematography: Bjørn Ståle Bratberg
- Production company: Silverprint Pictures

Original release
- Network: ITV; BritBox
- Release: 25 October – 28 October 2021

The Long Call is a British crime drama television series developed by Kelly Jones and Silverprint Pictures based on the 2019 novel of the same name by Ann Cleeves. It premiered on ITV in the United Kingdom on 25 October 2021 and was released internationally as a BritBox original following broadcast.

== Premise ==
The series follows Detective Inspector Matthew Venn as he returns to his hometown in Devon with his husband for his religious father's funeral, only to find himself investigating a local murder.

== Cast ==
=== Main ===
- Ben Aldridge as DI Matthew Venn
- Declan Bennett as Jonathan Roberts
- Siobhán Cullen as Caroline Reasley
- Anita Dobson as Grace Stephenson
- Dylan Edwards as Ross Pritchard
- Sarah Gordy as Lucy Craddle
- Aoife Hinds as Gaby Chadwell
- Pearl Mackie as DS Jen Rafferty
- Neil Morrissey as Christopher Reasley
- Amit Shah as Ed Raveley
- Martin Shaw as Dennis Stephenson
- Juliet Stevenson as Dorothy Venn
- Alan Williams as Maurice Craddle

=== Recurring ===
- Melissandre St Hilaire as Ella Rafferty
- Iona Anderson as Rosa Shapland
- Nia Gwynne as Ruth Shapland
- John-Paul MacLeod as Alfie James

== Episodes ==
| No. overall | No. in series | Title | Directed by | Written by | Original release date |
|---|---|---|---|---|---|
| 1 | 1 | "Two Rivers" | Lee Haven Jones | Kelly Jones | 25 October 2021 |
Detective Inspector Matthew Venn returns to his hometown in Devon, with his husband Jonathan Roberts. Not long after the funeral of his father, he is put in charge of the investigation into the murder of forty-year-old Simon Walton, whose body was found on the beach. It is discovered that his last name is actually Walden and that several years earlier he was responsible for an accident in which a child died. Matthew also discovers that the child's mother had been meeting with Simon and they felt bonded over the pain of the accident. Matthew attempts to reconcile with his mother, Dorothy, a member of the evangelical religious community where he grew up, and visits leader Dennis Stephenson, who gives him his father's Bible. Ruth Shapland, a friend of Dorothy's, reports her daughter Rosa missing and during questioning reveals that Simon had started attending church meetings at Rosa's invitation. The police receive an emergency call from a terrified Rosa, leading Matthew to conclude that she has been kidnapped.
| 2 | 2 | "Church of the Brethren" | Lee Haven Jones | Kelly Jones | 26 October 2021 |
Matthew and his team uncover a cabin where they suspect Rosa was kept, with bloodstains being the only evidence of her having been there. Further investigation into Simon Walden reveals that he was in a relationship with his housemate Gaby Chadwell; they used to meet at the same cabin but eventually broke up. Matthew's mother reveals that she and his father kept a scrap book containing news articles about his career. Christopher Reasley, the father of Walden's housemate Caroline, encourages her to take a two-week vacation, and she tells her boyfriend Ed that he is manipulative. Rosa is spotted in the woods near Lovecott, and the police start a search. Rosa is found and hospitalised, and a nurse explains that a head injury may have confused her memories. Caroline discovers a non-disclosure agreement between her father and Simon, and tells Ed that her father had caused the accident that injured her and killed her mother while driving drunk. Matthew's team uncovers CCTV footage that puts Christopher Reasley on their suspect list.
| 3 | 3 | "Woodyard" | Lee Haven Jones | Kelly Jones | 27 October 2021 |
Reasley is brought in for questioning about why he gave Rosa a 120 pounds necklace. Matthew and DS Jen Rafferty ask Rosa about what happened to her, but she claims being unable to remember anything after leaving the Woodyard community center, where she was volunteering. An effort to track down 200 thousand pounds that Simon had received reveals that Gaby had hidden it from him because he was planning to give it to the Woodyard to save it from scandal. Matthew questions Lucy Craddle, who had met secretly with Simon and appears to have been at the murder scene, but she initially refuses to talk. Gaby tells Caroline that she is pregnant with Simon's child. Grace Stephenson brings Rosa to the police, where she describes being sexually assaulted by Ed Ravely outside the Woodyard and Simon's stopping the assault. Caroline confronts her father about the non-disclosure agreement between him and Simon, which was related to Rosa's accusation against Ed. Caroline agrees to help Ed leave the area, but when they return home, the police arrive to arrest him.
| 4 | 4 | "Saint or Sinner" | Lee Haven Jones | Kelly Jones | 28 October 2021 |
During questioning, Ed admits assaulting Rosa but denies having any involvement in Simon's murder. Grace Stephenson listens as her husband Dennis entices Gaby to join the church, which triggers memories of his controlling behavior. She meets with Matthew and tells him how Simon saw the church's potential and about Dennis' emotionally abusive treatment of her. She makes a formal statement at the station, leading Matthew to find Simon's phone in Dennis' shed. Dennis is arrested but is later released due to lack of evidence and takes Grace home. Matthew asks his mother to help gather evidence against Dennis and tells her how growing up in their church led to years of self-loathing. Looking for Grace, Matthew confronts Dennis who knocks him out. As he regains consciousness, Grace is defying Dennis, berating him for his decades of emotional abuse and threatening him with the knife used to kill Simon. Matthew arrests her, and she confesses to stabbing Simon. She initially declines to implicate Dennis, but eventually describes how he coerced her, claiming that Simon would destroy the church. Dennis is arrested, and Matthew's mother leads the church's memorial for Simon.

== Production ==
In November 2020, it was announced Silverprint Pictures would adapt Ann Cleeves' novel for ITV. Kelly Jones would pen the four-part drama as her first standalone series and third collaboration with Silverprint on a Cleeves adaptation, with Lee Haven Jones directing and Angie Daniell producing.

Principal photography took place in 2020 on location in Bristol and the North Devon coast, particularly around the Taw and Torridge estuary. Matthew and Jonathan's house is located in Appledore. Actor Ben Aldridge grew up in the area.

== Reception ==
=== Accolades ===
| Year | Award | Category | Recipient(s) | Result | Ref. |
|---|---|---|---|---|---|
| 2022 | GLAAD Media Awards | Outstanding New TV Series | The Long Call | Nominated | |
