= Selina Lo =

British actress (born 1994)

- Born: 29 January 1994 (age 32)
- Education: Liverpool Institute for Performing Arts
- Occupation: Actress
- Website: selinalo.com

Selina Lo (born 29 January 1994) is a British actress. Her film roles include Guan Yin in Joe Carnahan's Boss Level (2020) and The Gasp in David Bruckner's Hellraiser (2022). She also appeared in season 2 of Lord of the Rings: The Rings of Power.

== Early life ==
Lo is of Chinese descent. In addition to performing, Lo was interested in martial arts growing up. She gave up the hobby after a knee injury. She trained in acting at the Sylvia Young Theatre School and the Liverpool Institute for Performing Arts (LIPA).

== Filmography ==
Films
| Year | Title | Role | Notes |
|---|---|---|---|
| 2010 | The Prince & Me 4: The Elephant Adventure | Rayen | |
| 2012 | The Scorpion King 3: Battle for Redemption | Tsukai | |
| 2016 | Time Rush | Jane | |
| 2018 | The Debt Collector | Sandy | |
| 2018 | Haphazard | Siren | |
| 2019 | Triple Threat | Fei Chen | |
| 2021 | Boss Level | Guan Yin | |
| 2022 | Winter Dream | Shu Yang | |
| 2022 | Hellraiser | The Gasp | |

Television
| Year | Title | Role | Notes |
|---|---|---|---|
| 2011 | 1st Look | Herself | Interviewee; Episode: ''The Scorpion King 3: Battle for Redemption" |
| 2012 | IC Places Hollywood | Herself | Interviewee; Episode: "From the 17th Annual Critics Choice Movie Awards" |
| 2014 | One Child | Xu Lian | TV miniseries |
| 2024 | The Lord of the Rings: The Rings of Power | Rían | Season 2 |

== Awards and nominations ==
| Year | Award | Category | Work | Result | Ref |
|---|---|---|---|---|---|
| 2019 | NOIDENTITY International Action Film Festival | Best Action Actress | Haphazard | Won | |
