= Charlie Tahan =

American actor (born 1998)

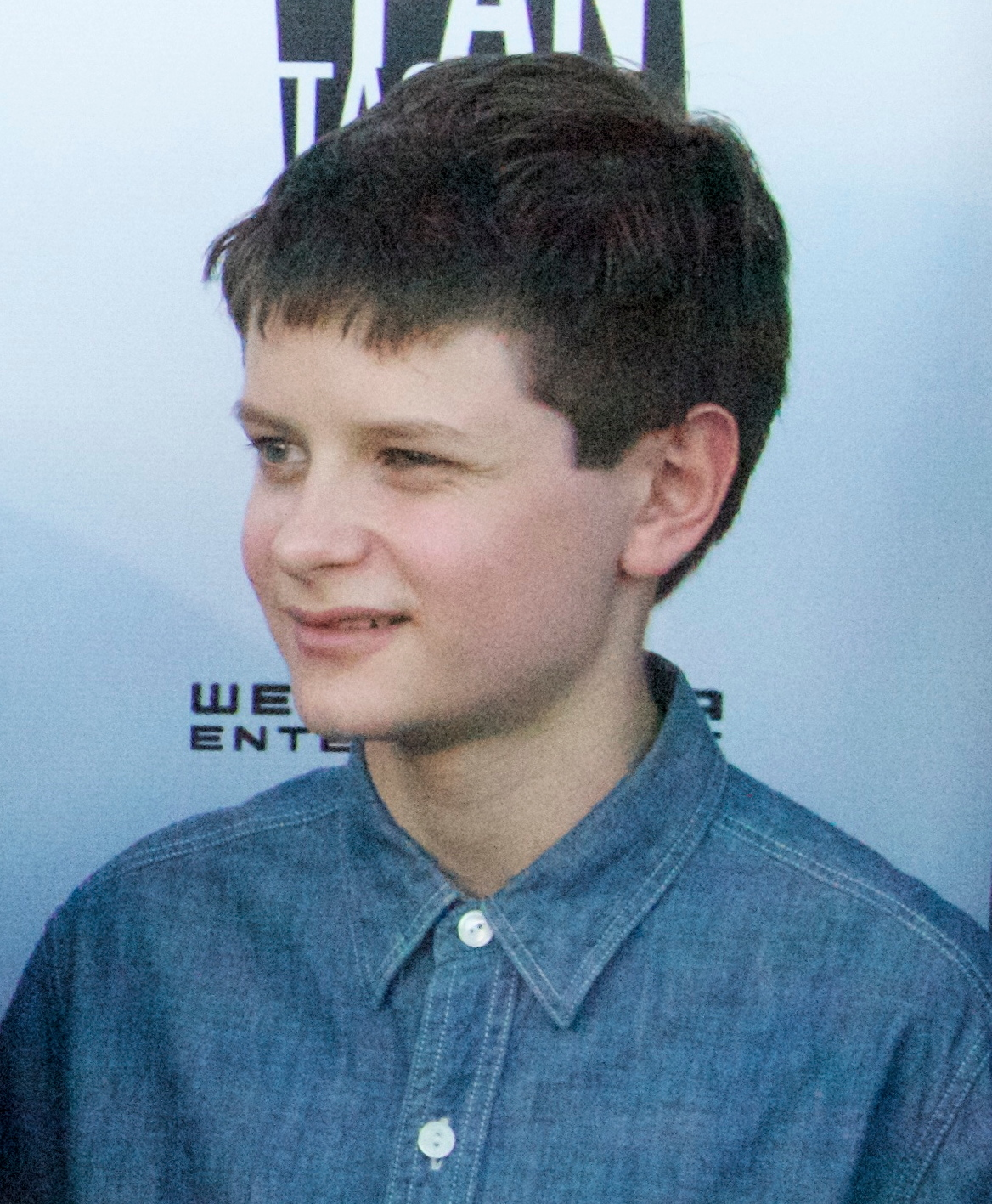
- Tahan at the premiere of Frankenweenie, 2012
- Born: Charles Tahan; June 11, 1998 (age 28); Glen Rock, New Jersey, U.S.
- Occupation: Actor
- Years active: 2006–present
- Relatives: Daisy Tahan (sister)

Charles Tahan (born June 11, 1998) is an American actor. Starting as a child actor, with appearances in the 2007 films American Loser and I Am Legend, he has progressed through teen and adult roles. His notable roles include Sam St. Cloud supernatural drama film Charlie St. Cloud (2010), Ben Burke in the Fox dystopian mystery thriller series Wayward Pines (2015–16), the young Jonathan Crane / Scarecrow in the Fox/DC Comics superhero drama Gotham (2014–17), and Wyatt Langmore in the Netflix original crime drama Ozark (2017–2022).

== Early life ==
Tahan was born and raised in Glen Rock, New Jersey, where he attended Glen Rock High School. He is the middle of three children. His younger sister is actress Daisy Tahan.

== Career ==
Tahan played Ethan in the post-apocalyptic science fiction horror film I Am Legend (2007) and appeared in the horror film Burning Bright (2010), Tahan co-starred with Zac Efron in the drama Charlie St. Cloud (2010), based on Ben Sherwood's 2004 novel The Death and Life of Charlie St. Cloud. He also voiced Victor Frankenstein in the Disney 3D stop-motion-animated fantasy horror comedy Frankenweenie (2012), directed by Tim Burton. In 2010, he had a recurring role as Calvin Arliss in the twelfth season of the NBC police procedural drama Law & Order: Special Victims Unit.

In 2009, Tahan co-starred as William Woolf in the drama The Other Woman.

In 2015, Tahan had a recurring role in two episodes of the first season of the Fox superhero drama Gotham. He played a young Dr. Jonathan Crane. In 2017, he returned to the show early in the fourth season until the role was recast to David W. Thompson. From 2015 to 2016, he starred as Ben Burke in the Fox dystopian mystery thriller series Wayward Pines created by M. Night Shyamalan.

Starting in 2017, Tahan starred as Wyatt Langmore in the Netflix crime drama series Ozark.

In 2022, Tahan filmed a role in the romantic comedy Things Like This, directed by his Super Dark Times costar Max Talisman.

In 2024, Tahan made his directorial debut with the short film Taxon. Written by Tommy Aiken and himself, the short was released on January 4 on the video hosting platform Vimeo.

== Filmography ==
=== Film ===
Year	Title	Role	Notes
2007	American Loser	Jeff 'Little Jeff'	
2007	Once Upon a Film	Hank	
2007	I Am Legend	Ethan	
2008	Nights in Rodanthe	Danny Willis	
2009	The Other Woman	William	
2010	Meskada	Keith Burrows	
2010	Charlie St. Cloud	Sam St. Cloud	
2010	Burning Bright	Tom Taylor	
2012	Frankenweenie	Victor Frankenstein	Voice
2013	Blood Ties	Michael Pierzynski	
2013	Blue Jasmine	Young Danny	
2013	Life of Crime	Bo Dawson	
2013	The Harvest	Andy Young / Jason	
2014	Love Is Strange	Joey Hull	
2016	Wiener-Dog	Warren	
2017	Super Dark Times	Josh	
2018	The Land of Steady Habits	Charlie	
2019	Poms	Ben	
2019	III	Junior Sparks	
2020	Drunk Bus	Michael	
2020	Unsubscribe	Whitey	Main antagonist
2021	Montauk	Marcus	previously called Kingfish
2022	The Pale Blue Eye	Cadet Loughborough	
2023	I'll Be Right There	Mark	
2024	Taxon	Polaroid doctor	Also director, writer and editor
2024	Witchboard	Richie	
2024	A Complete Unknown	Al Kooper	

=== Television ===
Year	Title	Role	Notes
2008	Fringe	Ben Stockton	Episode: "The Equation"
2010–2011	Law & Order: Special Victims Unit	Calvin Arliss	4 episodes
2012	Blue Bloods	Michael Keenan	Episode: "Some Kind of Hero"
2015–2016	Wayward Pines	Ben Burke	12 episodes
2015–2017	Gotham	Jonathan Crane / Scarecrow	4 episodes
2017–2022	Ozark	Wyatt Langmore	27 episodes
2018	Castle Rock	Dean Merrill	3 episodes
2020	FBI: Most Wanted	Doug Timmins	Episode: "Hairtrigger"
2020	Monsterland	Nick Smith / LoneWolf	Episode: "Eugene, Oregon"
TBA	Myron Bolitar	Roger Quincy	Recurring role, upcoming series

== Awards ==
Award	Year	Category	Work	Result	Ref.
Actor Awards	2019	Outstanding Performance by an Ensemble in a Drama Series	Ozark	Nominated	
Actor Awards	2021	Outstanding Performance by an Ensemble in a Drama Series	Ozark	Nominated	
Actor Awards	2023	Outstanding Performance by an Ensemble in a Drama Series	Ozark	Nominated	
Saturn Awards	2011	Best Performance by a Younger Actor	Charlie St. Cloud	Nominated	
Young Artist Award	2013	Best Performance in a Voice-Over Role (Feature Film) – Young Actor	Frankenweenie	Won	
