= Leone Marucci =

American film producer

Leone Marucci (born March 28, 1973, Youngstown, Ohio) is an American filmmaker and founder of Independent Film and Media company Steelyard Pictures.

- In 2020 Leone produced the horror/thriller The Inhabitant written by Kevin Bachar, directed by Jerren Lauder and starring Odessa A'Zion, Dermot Mulroney, Leslie Bibb, and Lizze Broadway in which infamous axe murderer Lizzie Borden's bloodline runs straight through the heart of suburban America where a series of supernatural events reveal a dark truth behind a tormented teenager. Marucci also served as the film's Picture Editor and Music Supervisor. Marucci discovered writer Kevin Bachar and his screenplay through Inktip.
- Leone wrote, produced and directed the 2013 film The Power of Few, which featured the ensemble cast of Christopher Walken, Christian Slater, Q'orianka Kilcher, Anthony Anderson, Navid Negahban, Jesse Bradford, Moon Bloodgood, Nicky Whelan, Devon Gearhart, Juvenile and others. Through The Power of Few website, Marucci and producing partner Q'orianka Kilcher developed and delivered a ground breaking interactive experience embarked upon in 2006. From online casting to online editing, the global audience was provided original material from the film (and an online editing system) and invited to help create the finished film. Marucci's interactive approach was featured in The Hollywood Reporter's article on "Digital-Do-It-Yourself."
