= Adrian Schiller =

English actor (1964–2024)

- Schiller in 2016
- Born: Adrian Townsend Schiller; 21 February 1964; Oxford, England
- Died: 3 April 2024 (aged 60); Norwich, Norfolk
- Occupation: Actor
- Years active: 1992–2024

Adrian Townsend Schiller (21 February 1964 – 3 April 2024) was an English actor. His most notable work was as Ealdorman Aethelhelm for three seasons of The Last Kingdom (2018-2022).

His tv and film credits also include A Touch of Frost (2000), Bright Star (2009), Terry Pratchett's Going Postal (2010), Being Human (2010), A Little Chaos (2014), Son of God (2014), The Danish Girl (2015), Suffragette (2015), Doctor Who (episode "The Doctor's Wife" 2011), Victoria (2016–2019), Beauty and the Beast (2017), The Mercy (2017), Tolkien (2019), Raised by Wolves (2020), Censor (2021), and The New Look (2024).

== Early life and career ==
Adrian Townsend Schiller was born in Oxford on 21 February 1964. He described himself as "a Jew, but not Jewish", as he "was brought up outside of any sort of Jewish tradition".

An actor on stage and screen with a career spanning over thirty years, Schiller began his television career appearing in an episode of Prime Suspect in December 1992.

=== Theatre ===
As a British stage actor, he did substantial work at major UK companies including Royal Shakespeare Company, National Theatre, Young Vic, Shakespeare’s Globe, ETT, and Hampstead. Notable performances include Kulygin in Three Sisters at the Young Vic (2012), and Shylock in The Merchant of Venice at the Sam Wanamaker Playhouse (2022). Throughout his career, he continued taking demanding stage roles alongside his screen work. Shortly before his death, he toured internationally in a production of The Lehman Trilogy, directed by Sam Mendes.

=== Television and Film ===
Schiller was the face on the anti-drink-driving PIF Moment of Doubt on British TV, part of the DfT's 'Think! Road Safety' campaign from 2007. The advert won Best Casting at the BTACA awards in December 2008.

From 2018-2022, he played Ealdorman Aethelhelm for three seasons of The Last Kingdom. In his obituary in The Guardian, journalist Michael Coveney wrote that his performance "would suggest that here was a naturally authoritative actor, blessed with gravitas and style."

In 2021, he played Pasha Verdinikov in two episodes of Death in Paradise.

== Death ==
Schiller died "suddenly and unexpectedly" on 3 April 2024, at the age of 60. His death was announced the following day in a statement by his agent. The cause of death was a major ischaemic stroke. According to the Stroke Association, this happens when a blockage stops blood from reaching part of the brain, causing brain cells to die. It also notes that roughly 85% of strokes in the UK are ischaemic, making this the most common type.

== Stage ==
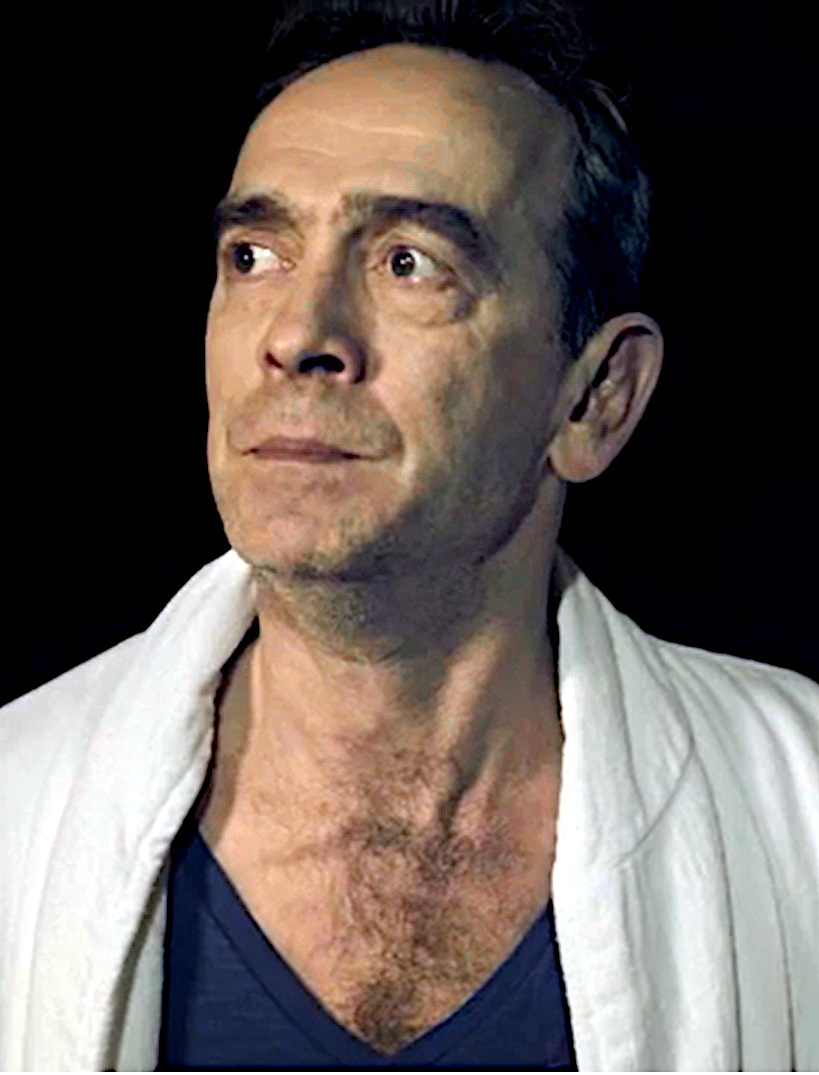
Adrian Schiller at Rose Theatre 2013

Selected stage appearances:

- 1991 – The Knickers (Lyric Theatre Hammersmith)
- 1996 – Macbeth – Porter (Royal Shakespeare Company)
- 2000 – As You Like It – Touchstone (Royal Shakespeare Company)
- 2005 – Julius Caesar – Cassius (Royal Shakespeare Company, touring)
- 2006 – Tartuffe – title role (Watermill Theatre, Newbury)
- 2007 – The Changeling – De Flores (English Touring Theatre)
- 2008 – The Hour We Knew Nothing of Each Other – ensemble (National Theatre)
- 2012 – Three Sisters – Kulygin (Young Vic)
- 2013 – Captain of Köpenick (National Theatre)
- 2013 – Hysteria – Salvador Dalí (Hampstead Theatre, revival)
- 2022 – The Merchant of Venice – Shylock (Sam Wanamaker Playhouse at Shakespeare’s Globe)
- 2023 – The White Factory (Marylebone Theatre)
- 2023 – Short plays on Jewish identity (Soho Theatre)
- 2024 – The Lehman Trilogy (international tour)

== Filmography ==
- The Hour We Knew Nothing of Each Other (2008, theatre performance)
- Bright Star (2009)
- Terry Pratchett's Going Postal (2010) (cast as the Banshee, Mr. Gryle)
- Being Human (Season 2, 2010)
- A Touch of Frost
- A Little Chaos (2014)
- Son of God (2014) as Caiaphas
- The Danish Girl (2015)
- Suffragette (2015) as David Lloyd George
- Doctor Who (2011, episode "The Doctor's Wife")
- Victoria (2016–2019) as Mr Penge, footman at Kensington Palace
- Beauty and the Beast (2017)
- The Mercy (2017)
- The Last Kingdom (2018–2022)
- Tolkien (2019)
- Raised by Wolves (2020)
- Censor (2021)
- The New Look (2024)

== Computer games ==
- Indiana Jones and the Staff of Kings (2009) (video game, Magnus Völler)
- Fable III (2010) (video game, The Crawler)
- Castlevania: Lords of Shadow (2010)
- Assassin's Creed III (2012)
- Raid: World War II (2017)
