= Super Dark Times =

2017 film by Kevin Phillips

- Theatrical release poster
- Directed by: Kevin Phillips
- Written by: Ben Collins; Luke Piotrowski
- Produced by: Edward Parks; Richard Peete; Jett Steiger
- Starring: Owen Campbell; Charlie Tahan; Elizabeth Cappuccino; Max Talisman
- Cinematography: Eli Born
- Edited by: Ed Yonaitis
- Music by: Ben Frost
- Distributed by: The Orchard
- Release dates: January 29, 2017 (Rotterdam); September 29, 2017 (United States)
- Running time: 103 minutes
- Country: United States
- Language: English
- Box office: $33,109

Super Dark Times is a 2017 American independent psychological thriller film, directed by Kevin Phillips and written by Ben Collins and Luke Piotrowski. It is Phillips' directorial debut, and stars Owen Campbell, Charlie Tahan, Elizabeth Cappuccino, Max Talisman and Amy Hargreaves. The plot follows the story of an inseparable pair of teenage boys who, after a traumatic accident, loses their innocence and sanity from jealousy, violence and paranoia.

== Plot ==
In 1996, in Upstate New York, two teenage best friends, Zach and Josh, rate the girls in their yearbook. They find a common interest in Allison.

After school, the duo crosses the path of the universally-disliked Daryl and his eighth-grade friend Charlie. Later that week, the four boys meet up at Josh's house where they look through the possessions of Josh's brother, who is away in the military, and find a bag of marijuana and a katana.

Afterwards, the boys play with the sword in a secluded park area bordering the local cemetery and notice that Daryl has stolen the marijuana. After a tense argument, Josh and Daryl fight, resulting in Daryl being accidentally stabbed in the neck with the katana. Daryl runs from the scene but only makes it into the adjacent forest where he dies. The boys panic and hide both Daryl's body and the weapon.

At school, rumors circulate about Daryl's disappearance. Zach has nightmares and Josh doesn't attend classes. Zach wants to return to Daryl's burial site and attend Allison's upcoming party with Josh, who declines but goes to Allison's party separately where he shares his brother's weed. Zach, disturbed, leaves.

Another student, John, is found dead. Rumors speculate that he fell off a bridge. Zach suspects that Josh is responsible for John's death. He returns to Daryl's burial site and finds the katana missing and Daryl's corpse mutilated.

Zach goes to Josh's home and realizes Josh is with Allison. He tracks her to Meghan's house, where Josh has killed Meghan with the katana and tied Allison up. After Zach unties her, the former friends fight until a neighbor intervenes and subdues Josh, who is arrested, while Zach's fate is left unknown.

Months later, Allison has recovered and returns to school. A camera shot shows three parallel lines on the back of her neck.

== Cast ==
- Owen Campbell as Zach Taylor
- Charlie Tahan as Josh Templeton
- Elizabeth Cappuccino as Allison Bannister
- Max Talisman as Daryl Harper
- Sawyer Barth as Charlie Barth
- Amy Hargreaves as Karen Taylor, Zach's mother
- Adea Lennox as Meghan
- Ethan Botwick as John Whitcomb
- Justin Rose as Kevin Bannister, Allison's Brother
- Anni Krueger as Mrs. Barron
- Kortnee Simmons as Eugene
- Casey Sullivan as Senior

== Production ==
The film was shot in Kingston, New York. According to Phillips, the opening deer scene "was based on a deer in Pennsylvania that broke through the window of a school and bled to death on the ground."

== Release ==
The film premiered at the Rotterdam Film Festival. It made its North American premiere on April 20, 2017, at the Tribeca Film Festival. Deadline Hollywood reported that The Orchard had acquired worldwide distribution rights to the film in March 2017. The film was released in theaters on September 29, 2017, and digitally on October 3, 2017. It plays on Hulu streaming.

=== Reception ===
The film has a 90% approval rating on Rotten Tomatoes based on 48 reviews, with an average rating of 7.3/10. The site's critics consensus reads: "Rich in atmosphere and period detail, Super Dark Times is an effective teen thriller whose true power lies in its approach to deeper themes." Metacritic reports a score of 75/100 based on 18 critics, indicating "generally favorable reviews".

David Ehrlich of IndieWire graded the film a B−. In a favorable review, Sheila O'Malley of RogerEbert.com praised the young actors, writing that it is a film that prioritizes "mood over story" and that its "devotion to the harrowing emotional fallout of such an event" makes it better than other films of the same kind.

=== Awards and nominations ===
Super Dark Times won the best feature film award at the 17th Neuchâtel International Fantastic Film Festival. It was also the winner of Best Sound Design in a Feature Film at the 2017 Music+Sound Awards, and received a nomination for the Saturn Award for Best Independent Film at the 44th Saturn Awards. At the 33rd Independent Spirit Awards, Kevin Phillips was nominated for the Someone to Watch Award.

== See also ==
- I Am Not a Serial Killer
- Summer of 84
