= The Inhabitant =

Horror Film

- Theatrical Release Poster
- Directed by: Jerren Lauder
- Written by: Kevin Bachar
- Produced by: Leone Marucci; Petr Jakl
- Starring: Odessa A'zion; Leslie Bibb; Dermot Mulroney; Lizze Broadway
- Cinematography: Brian Sowell
- Edited by: Mikhail Aranyshev; Leone Marucci
- Music by: Sanford Parker
- Production companies: Steelyard Pictures; R. U. Robot Studios
- Distributed by: Lionsgate; Gravitas Ventures
- Release date: October 7, 2022
- Country: United States
- Language: English

The Inhabitant is a 2022 American horror-thriller film directed by Jerren Lauder, written by Kevin Bachar and starring Odessa A'zion, Leslie Bibb, Dermot Mulroney, and Lizze Broadway.

The Inhabitant follows a teenage girl who fears that she may be behind a series of gruesome murders in her town, particularly as she is a descendant of Lizzie Borden.

== Plot ==
The film centers on Tara, a teenage girl who believes that her family is the target of a horrific curse that started with their ancestor, the notorious Lizzie Borden. Those suffering from the curse experience nightmares, murderous impulses, and visions of Lizzie, who urges them to commit murder. Fearful and depressed, Tara's only solace is her hobby of redesigning vintage clothing, which her mother Emily sells for her online.

When several townspeople are discovered murdered, the police are quick to suspect Tara; as all of the victims had issues with her, and the murderer was seen wearing one of Tara's dresses. Seeking answers, Tara goes to visit her aunt Diane, who was institutionalized for the murder of her infant child. During the meeting Diane claims that Emily experienced the same curse, implying that Emily may be the murderer.

Left with more questions than answers, Tara decides to visit Borden House with her boyfriend Carl. While at the house Tara learns that Lizzie was an excellent seamstress, causing her to wonder if the dresses are a trigger. Intrigued, Tara sends Suzy to her house to fetch some dresses. When the girl does not return or respond to calls, Tara and Carl travel to Tara's home, where she learns that her aunt has escaped from the mental institution. She also learns that her mother is the true killer and that Emily had also killed Diane's baby, as she believed it to be the product of incest between Diane and their father. In a psychotic rage Emily sympathizes with Lizzie Borden, who she believes killed her parents due to her mother's suspected infidelity. Emily then turns to slaughter Tara, but before she can do so, Emily is shot down by the police, as Tara's brother Caleb had called for help. The film ends with one of Tara's brothers talking to the spirit of Lizzie Borden, implying that he is a victim of the same curse.

== Cast ==
- Odessa A'zion as Tara Haldon
- Leslie Bibb as Emily Haldon
- Dermot Mulroney as Ben Haldon
- Lizze Broadway as Suzy Beemer
- Kenneisha Thompson as Detective Childs
- Todd Jenkins as Mikhail Loeb

== Production ==
Producer Leone Marucci first optioned the script in 2019; Dermot Mulroney and Lizze Broadway were named as two of the film's stars. The film was one of several impacted by the COVID-19 pandemic, as it experienced a short delay in filming. During this time the script was reworked so that The Inhabitant could be filmed with a smaller cast and in a single location.

=== Filming ===
Principal photography for The Inhabitant took place in Tulsa, Oklahoma and the surrounding areas, including Broken Arrow in November 2020. Production took place over a month with down time due to a COVID situation. Much of the shooting was at night working on practical sets in existing homes.

== Release ==
The Inhabitant was given a limited theatrical release on October 7, 2020, alongside a release on VOD.

The film received a home video release on Blu-Ray on November 15, 2022. The Blu-Ray featured a behind the scenes featurette and a commentary track by the writer, Kevin Bachar, and producer, Leone Marucci.

== Reception ==
The Inhabitant holds a rating of 71% on Rotten Tomatoes, based on 7 reviews. Common elements of praise center on its tension, characters, and cinematography, with Easy Reader's Neely Swanson writing that "the writing, directing, production values, and acting are all first rate."

Reviewers for Common Sense Media and In Review Online were more critical, with Common Sense Media's Jeffrey Anderson praising the characters while also writing that "It's too bad the movie springs a dull, poorly played whodunit on viewers in the end, as well as a race against time to save the day."
