= Cottontail (film) =

Film by Patrick Dickinson

- Film poster
- Directed by: Patrick Dickinson
- Written by: Patrick Dickinson
- Produced by: Jamie Harvey; Satch Watanabe; Gabrielle Tana; Kosuke Oshida; Carolyn Marks Blackwood; Hélène Théodoly.
- Starring: Ciarán Hinds; Aoife Hinds; Lily Franky; Ryo Nishikido; Tae Kimura; Rin Takanashi
- Cinematography: Mark Wolf
- Production companies: Brouhaha Entertainment; MBK Productions; Magnolia Mae Films; Written Rock Films
- Distributed by: WestEnd Films
- Release date: 26 October 2023 (Rome)
- Countries: United Kingdom; Japan
- Language: English

Cottontail (Japanese: コットンテール) is a 2023 drama film written and directed by Patrick Dickinson.

It premiered at the Rome Film Festival on 26 October 2023, winning the BNL BNP Paribas Best First Film award.

== Premise ==
A widower and his son travel from Japan to England's Lake District to scatter his wife's ashes there, as she grew up loving the stories of Beatrix Potter.

== Cast ==
- Lily Franky as Kenzaburo
- Kosei Kudo as young Kenzaburo
- Ryo Nishikido as Toshi
- Tae Kimura as Akiko
- Yuri Tsunematsu as young Akiko
- Rin Takanashi as Satsuki
- Ciarán Hinds as John
- Aoife Hinds as Mary

== Production ==
It was announced in November 2019 that Ken Watanabe, Ralph Fiennes, Jessie Buckley and Dai Watanabe had been cast in the film. Filming was set take place between Japan and England, beginning autumn 2020.

In April 2021, the previously announced cast, minus Buckley, had exited the film, with Lily Franky, Ciarán Hinds, Ryo Nishikido, Tae Kimura and Rin Takanashi now set to star. Filming took place in June 2021.

Late 2022, it was announced that Ciarán Hinds's daughter Aoife Hinds had replaced Buckley.

It was produced by Gabrielle Tana, Kosuke Oshida, Carolyn Marks Blackwood, and Hélène Théodoly.
