= The Moor (film) =

- Poster
- Directed by: Chris Cronin
- Written by: Paul Thomas
- Produced by: Chris Cronin; Paweł Pracz; Paul Thomas
- Starring: Sophia La Porta; David Edward-Robertson; Elizabeth Dormer-Phillips; Vicki Hackett; Bernard Hill
- Cinematography: Sam Cronin
- Edited by: Paweł Pracz
- Music by: Nir Perlman
- Production company: Nuclear Tangerine
- Distributed by: Bulldog Film Distribution
- Release date: June 14, 2024
- Running time: 118 minutes
- Country: United Kingdom
- Language: English

The Moor is a 2024 British mystery horror drama film written by Paul Thomas, directed by Chris Cronin and starring Sophia La Porta, David Edward-Robertson, Elizabeth Dormer-Phillips, Vicki Hackett and Bernard Hill.

== Plot ==
In 1996, Claire, a girl living in a Yorkshire town, convinces her friend Danny to distract a shopkeeper while she steals sweets from his shop. She succeeds and leaves the shop, but is later unable to find Danny. It is revealed that Danny was kidnapped and murdered by a serial killer who targeted children and buried the corpses of his victims in a nearby moor. The killer was sentenced to 25 years in prison, but the victims' bodies were never recovered.

25 years later, Danny's father Bill convinces Claire to help him find Danny's corpse in the moor. They travel to the area near the moor, and Bill introduces Claire to Liz, a friend who lives close to the moor. That night, Bill informs Claire that he searched one area of the moor but was unsuccessful.

Claire meets with Thornley, an acquaintance who helped with the search in the moor in 1996. He informs her that the area of the moor has a lot of treacherous terrain and that he has no idea why Bill is searching for Danny in the area. Claire returns to the house at which they are staying to learn that Bill has recruited the aid of Alex, a diviner, in their search.

The next day, Claire, Bill and Liz start their search in the area of the moor highlighted by Alex. Claire becomes separated from Bill and Liz and finds a child's shoe in a ditch. Bill and Liz reunite with her and they take the shoe as evidence. Claire becomes panicked when she believes they have lost their way, but she calms down once she reaches the main road.

Alex refuses to help Bill and Claire to continue their search for Danny. Alex's daughter Eleanor arrives at their cottage, and she performs a divination using the shoe they found, which highlights an area deeper in the moor. The four return to the moor together with Liz. Eleanor has a vision of one of the murdered children whose shoe they recovered and starts chasing her, resulting in Eleanor falling into a ditch. Eleanor starts saying "five" repeatedly in a trance before regaining consciousness. The group finds the girl's corpse while digging in the ditch.

Four weeks later, the killer has agreed to lead the police to the locations of his victims’ bodies in the moor; however, they have not been able to recover Danny's body. Bill, Eleanor, Alex and Claire perform a séance in which Eleanor acts as a medium for Thomas, a dead child. Bill attempts to get information from Thomas about Danny, but is unsuccessful. Their map of the moor becomes supernaturally soaked, and the divination pendulum drags itself to a location in the moor.

The five head out to the location marked by the pendulum. They encounter an ancient monolith with five concentric circles carved into it; Bill says the monoliths are present in groups of five. Heavy rain starts falling while they are travelling, forcing them to take shelter in a tent. Eleanor says that Thomas is acting unnaturally nervous and that they are not wanted in the area, and Claire finds the place familiar. A heavy fog settles in the area, and they decide to wait until it clears up for safety.

That night, Bill sees a figure in the fog and chases after it, but gets stuck in some peat, from which Liz frees him. Alex also leaves the tent, and Claire admits to Eleanor that she feels guilty about her role in Danny’s disappearance. Eleanor says that something wants Claire. Alex returns to the tent, but is completely silent. Eleanor starts becoming afraid of an unseen presence and screams in terror upon seeing Alex's face, prompting Bill and Liz to return to the tent. They find Eleanor in a trance, and Liz unsuccessfully attempts to radio for help. Eleanor experiences an apparent possession, and the group hears the voices of children, including Danny's. During the commotion, they realise that Alex has vanished. Bill and Liz find Alex on the moor, but he says he was outside for several hours and was unable to find them. The three decide to return to the tent, as they encounter sheep that have no eyes.

The next morning, Liz is able to call for help, and the group is rescued. That night, Liz tells Bill that she will not help him anymore. Claire learns that the killer was able to escape from the police due to the inclement weather on the moor and is at large. Bill buys a shotgun as a precaution against the killer. Claire returns home and records a new episode of her podcast.

Claire is later abducted by Bill, who has taken her back to the moor with him. Bill, now completely insane, believes that Claire was supposed to be offered as a sacrifice on the moor instead of Danny and forces her deeper into the moor at gunpoint. Bill shoots at a figure in the fog, prompting Claire to run in a panic and fall into a patch of peat. Bill finds her, and the corpses in the peat begin to rise and reach for her. Danny appears close to Bill, who embraces him as Claire is drowned by the corpses.

== Cast ==
- Sophia La Porta as Claire
- David Edward-Robinson as Bill
- Bernard Hill as Thornley
- Elizabeth Dormer-Phillips as Eleanor
- Mark Peachey as Alex
- Vicki Hackett as Liz
- Dexter Sol Ansell as Danny
- Billie Suggett as Young Claire

== Release ==
The film was released theatrically in the United Kingdom on June 14, 2024.

== Reception ==
On the review aggregator website Rotten Tomatoes, 75% of 12 critics' reviews are positive, with an average rating of 6.8/10.

Martin Unsworth of Starburst awarded the film four stars out of five, saying it "is dripping with malevolent atmosphere and by occasionally using first-person ‘found footage' techniques, puts us in the middle of the terror. There are flaws... but it's well-acted and has enough surprises to draw you into its world." The Hollywood News's Kat Hughes also gave it four stars out of five, writing, "Though long, The Moor needs that time to let the melancholy and horror seep in; like a good cup of Yorkshire tea The Moor needs time to stew. The end result is an emotional, haunting, and upon occasion, harrowing, tale of grief, guilt and ghosts." Phil Hoad of The Guardian awarded the film three stars out of five, writing, "Most of the central performances are also a bit vanilla, with the exception of the impressive Edward-Robertson, his face locked in a stress rictus that lets slip twisted grief. If Cronin had stayed similarly grounded, he might have had one of the best British horror films in years on his hands; as it is, he hasn't, but has a pretty promising future instead."
