= The Power of Few =

2013 film by Leone Marucci

- Theatrical release poster
- Directed by: Leone Marucci
- Screenplay by: Leone Marucci
- Produced by: Jimmy Holcomb; Roy Scott Macfarland; Jay Thames; Fred D'Amico; Q'Orianka Kilcher; Leone Marucci
- Starring: Christopher Walken; Christian Slater; Q'orianka Kilcher; Anthony Anderson; Jesse Bradford; Moon Bloodgood; Nicky Whelan; Devon Gearhart; Juvenile; Navid Negahban; Jordan Prentice; Derek Richardson
- Edited by: Jonathan Walls
- Music by: Mike Simpson
- Production companies: Steelyard Pictures; IQ Films
- Distributed by: Steelyard Pictures
- Release date: February 14, 2013 (United States)
- Running time: 95 minutes
- Country: United States
- Language: English
- Budget: $3.4 million
- Box office: $30,444

The Power of Few is a 2013 American drama film directed, written and produced by Leone Marucci. The Power of Few was produced by Marucci through Steelyard Pictures with Q'orianka Kilcher and her company iQ Films.

== Plot ==
It is a crime drama featuring five interconnected stories, set in New Orleans.

== Cast ==
The film has an ensemble cast that includes Christopher Walken, Fisher Ashworth, Christian Slater, Q'orianka Kilcher, Anthony Anderson, Jesse Bradford, Moon Bloodgood, Nicky Whelan, Devon Gearhart, Juvenile, Navid Negahban, Jordan Prentice, and Derek Richardson.

== Production ==
Marucci and Kilcher set out to make the production process "interactive", with The Power of Few website used to disclose many details of production, as well as to solicit audience feedback. From online casting to online editing, the global audience was provided original material from the film (and an online editing system) and invited to help create the finished film. The interactive collaboration continued beyond the website as the production ran a community outreach program in New Orleans during filming.

== Release ==
The Power of Few debuted theatrically in the United States on February 14, 2013. Steelyard Pictures platform released the film theatrically starting in two markets and expanding to 40 markets throughout the spring of 2013. Gaiam Vivendi is distributing the film on all non-theatrical platforms.
