= Siren (2016 film) =

Film by Gregg Bishop

- Theatrical release poster
- Directed by: Gregg Bishop
- Written by: Ben Collins; Luke Piotrowski
- Based on: "Amateur Night" by: David Bruckner; Nicholas Tecosky
- Produced by: Gary Binkow; Jude S. Walko; Brad Miska
- Starring: Chase Williamson; Justin Welborn; Michael Aaron Milligan; Hayes Mercure; Randy McDowell; Hannah Fierman
- Cinematography: George Feucht
- Edited by: Gregg Bishop
- Music by: Kristopher Carter
- Production company: Studio 71
- Distributed by: Chiller Films
- Release dates: August 28, 2016 (Horror Channel FrightFest); December 2, 2016 (United States)
- Running time: 82 minutes
- Country: United States
- Language: English

Siren (stylized as SiREN) is a 2016 American supernatural horror film directed by Gregg Bishop and written by Ben Collins and Luke Piotrowski. It is the first spin-off film in the V/H/S franchise and feature-length adaptation of "Amateur Night", David Bruckner's segment from the 2012 film V/H/S. The film focuses on Jonah (Chase Williamson) and his groomsmen the day before his wedding, as they embark on a wild night of partying and debauchery. The party, however, becomes a savage fight for survival when they unwittingly unleash a fabled predator upon the festivities.

Siren received a limited theatrical release on December 2, 2016, and received mixed reviews from critics reception.

== Plot ==
A mystic and a sheriff investigate a séance in a church that has gone wrong, resulting in the deaths of those who were present during the ceremony. The sheriff is killed by the creature that was summoned, which appears as a young girl. The mystic fastens a shackle around her ankle.

Years later, Jonah goes out with his brother Mac and friends Rand and Elliot for his bachelor's party. They are let down by the first strip club they visit, but a stranger approaches them and brings them to a secret club, whose owner is revealed to be Nyx, the mystic from earlier. He welcomes them and upon hearing that Jonah wants a non-sexual experience, Nyx sends him to a private room.

Jonah sees a captive woman on the other side of a glass window. He tries to talk to her and she begins singing with mermaid's song. Jonah, in a trance, suddenly relives all the sexual encounters he has ever had at once. Fearing that the woman is a sex slave, Jonah and his friends help her escape. She is revealed to be the creature from the earlier scene and transforms into a demonic creature, killing a guard so she can escape. After the friends flee in a car, the woman pursues them, crashes the car, and kidnaps Elliot.

Nyx and his men kidnap Rand and torture him, questioning what his intentions are regarding the creature – Lilith. Jonah and Mac escape to a diner and seek help from some police officers. Jonah quickly discovers that they are working for Nyx, and Lilith tracks them to the diner. She kills everyone inside and flies away with Jonah. In a quarry, Lilith puts Jonah into a trance and makes him visualize Eva, Jonah's fiancée, while Lilith rapes him. When he comes to his senses, Jonah returns to his hotel where Nyx offers a trade of Rand for Lilith.

At the church, Nyx tells Jonah that Lilith is a succubus that he had imprisoned. Nyx tells Jonah that Lilith has bonded with him and that if he is able to put the shackle back on her, that will allow Nyx to control her once again and they will be free to leave. Lilith arrived, kills Nyx and his henchmen, and Lilith releases Jonah with a kiss after Mac is killed.

One year later, Jonah and Eva are celebrating their anniversary. After making love, Jonah goes downstairs and sees Eva asleep on the couch, realizing Lilith used another trance upstairs. In a fit of jealous rage, she attacks Eva, and Jonah says he will go with her if she spares Eva. Lilith grabs Jonah, and they fly off as Eva helplessly watches them disappear into the night.

== Cast ==
- Chase Williamson as Jonah
- Hannah Fierman as Lilith
- Justin Welborn as Mr. Nyx
- Hayes Mercure as Rand
- Michael Aaron Milligan as Mac
- Brittany S. Hall as Ash
- Randy McDowell as Elliot
- Lindsey Garrett as Eva
- William Mark McCullough as The Addict
- Patrick Wood as Bouncer
- Stephen Caudill as Sheriff Boone
- Brian F. Durkin as Officer O'Brian
- Preston James Hillier as Officer Collins
- Ava Atwood as Young Lily

== Production ==
In May 2015, Chiller Films slated Siren, a V/H/S spinoff of the segment "Amateur Night", written by Ben Collins and Luke Piotrowski, to premiere in 2016. In August 2015, Ain't it Cool News reported that production was underway in Savannah, Georgia, with Hannah Fierman reprising her role and Gregg Bishop serving as director. David Bruckner, creator of the original segment, was initially slated to direct, but would ultimately pass on the offer due to his involvement on an unmade Friday the 13th reboot. Producer Brad Miska then offered the film to Bishop, who both previously collaborated on V/H/S: Viral. Bruckner was heavily involved with the project, serving as an executive producer, second unit director, and oversaw the development of the screenplay with Collins and Piotrowski. The filmmakers opted not to use the found footage format to differentiate the feature from the short film.

Even though the studio was pushing for other actresses for the role of Lily, director Gregg Bishop insisted that Hannah Fierman reprise her role as Lily, stating that she was the primary reason that the character was so iconic in the short. Fierman was initially hesitant to return to the role of Lily, but would ultimately sign on to the project after being drawn in by Bruckner's pitch. The actress also took part in auditioning for the role during casting.

For the parts of the movie where Lily sings, the filmmakers decided in pre-production to utilize Fierman's singing voice. She would lip sync to a guide track for the first take to just get the melody and timing of the song (the filmmakers never intending to use that take), then in the following takes she would sing it for real. Justin Welborn was cast as Mr. Nyx, who also starred in Bruckner's film The Signal and Bishop's Dance of the Dead.

Filming took place in the swamps of Georgia. Fierman said it was "Very very humid, and we were shooting in this thick dense fog, and there were bugs and chiggers, and we were shooting in the sulphur swamp, so it smelt like rotten eggs the whole time. It was insane. My prosthetics were actually sweating off."

== Release ==
Siren was released on December 2, 2016 by Chiller Films. and then released on DVD on December 6, 2016 by Universal Home Video. The film was subsequently released on Netflix on January 1, 2020.

== Reception ==
On the review aggregator website Rotten Tomatoes, 65% of 20 critics' reviews are positive, with an average rating of 5.3/10. Metacritic, which uses a weighted average, assigned the film a score of 54 out of 100, based on nine critics, indicating "mixed or average" reviews.

Noel Murray of the Los Angeles Times said the film was "for the most part... a clever and confident expansion of a terrific short. It stings less but packs plenty of poison." Variety's Dennis Harvey called it "lively if occasionally rough around the edges, packing a satisfying amount of action and a couple of amusingly nasty surprises into its short running time... While the concept's potential isn't fully tapped, there's enough fun to be had here that one hopes any future installments will sustain and increase the air of macabre unpredictability". Rob Staeger of The Village Voice wrote, "The heroic impulses encourage viewers to buy into the story instead of merely gawking. The villains are likewise compelling — Justin Welborn lends club owner Mr. Nyx a sinister congeniality, while Brittany S. Hall's bartender is a no-nonsense enigma in a Day-Glo wig and short shorts, dispensing nightmarish cocktails that transmit stolen memories."

The New York Times's Neil Genzlinger wrote, "The movie is a not-great horror flick, but if it discourages one future groom from having a final ill-advised night of debauchery, it will have served a purpose."

Ain't It Cool News called SiREN "a rock solid monster movie” and hailed that "every scene with Fierman is electric."

We Are Indie Horror named it as one of the Top 10 Feature Films of 2016 and said, "SiREN is a phenomenal and intense adaptation of “Amateur Night.” It stands on its own and is a must-see."
