= Sophia La Porta =

British actress

- Born: Watford, Hertfordshire, England
- Education: ArtsEd
- Occupation: Actress
- Years active: 2010–present

Sophia La Porta is an English actress. Her films include Censor (2021) and The Moor (2023). On television, she is known for her role in the Hulu miniseries Four Weddings and a Funeral (2019). She also appeared in the Sky One miniseries The Five (2016) and the BBC drama The Gold (2023).

La Porta began acting professionally in the early 2010s, first appearing on TV in the medical drama Holby City (2010) followed by supernatural miniseries The Fades (2011). Her first feature film appearances were in 2018, with supporting roles in well-received musical Been So Long and drama Into the Mirror.

== Early life ==
La Porta is from Hertfordshire. She attended the Royal Masonic School for Girls in Rickmansworth. She went on to train at the Arts Educational School (ArtsEd), graduating in 2013 with a Bachelor of Arts in Acting. She also took acting classes with RAaW London and a week-long food presenting course at a cooking school.

== Filmography ==
Key
†	Denotes projects that have not yet been released

=== Film ===
Year	Title	Role	Notes	Ref.
2014	Clap!	Mystery Girl	Short film	
2016	Space Beers: The Prologue	Zendra	Short film	
2018	SIREN	Amy	Short film	
2018	Into the Mirror	Gingee		
2018	Been So Long	Willesden		
2021	Censor	Alice Lee		
2023	The Moor	Claire		
2025	Picture This	Lily		
TBA	Empty Crib †	Beth	Post-production	

=== Television ===
Year	Title	Role	Notes	Ref.
2010	Holby City	Jasmine Burrows	Episode: "What Goes Around"	
2011	The Fades	Tracy	Miniseries; 2 episodes	
2013	Playhouse Presents	Performer	Episode: "Hey Diddly Dee"	
2013	Doctors	Bree Davies	Episode: "The Eggs"	
2014	Birds of a Feather	Rosie	Episode: "Hearts for Sale"	
2014	Ripper Street	Juniper Kohl	Episode: "Ashes and Diamonds"	
2015	A Long Long Crime Ago	Various roles	Recurring role; 3 episodes	
2016	The Five	Britnay Shearer	Recurring role; 8 episodes	
2017	Stan Lee's Lucky Man	Mia Larson	Episode: "Lamb to the Slaughter"	
2019	Four Weddings and a Funeral	Zara	Series regular; 10 episodes	
2019	Top Boy	Policewoman	Episode: "You Don't Know Me"	
2020	Flack	Roxy Barron	Episode: "Brand Barron"	
2020	Urban Myths	Chrissie	Episode: "Hendrix & Handel"	
2020	On the Edge	Caitlin	Episode: "For You"	
2023	The Gold	Kathleen Meacock	Recurring role; 4 episodes	
2024	Call the Midwife	Iris Melia	Episode: "Series 13, Episode 1"	
2024	Sexy Beast	Sara	Recurring role; 2 episodes	
