= Odessa A'zion =

American actress (born 2000)

- A'zion in 2026
- Born: Odessa Zion Segall Adlon; June 17, 2000 (age 26); Sacramento, California, U.S.
- Citizenship: United States; Germany
- Education: Champs Charter High School
- Occupation: Actress
- Years active: 2011−present
- Mother: Pamela Adlon
- Relatives: Gideon Adlon (sister); Percy Adlon (paternal grandfather); Lorenz Adlon (great-great-great-grandfather)

Odessa Zion Segall Adlon (/ˈædlɒn/ AD-lon; born June 17, 2000), known professionally as Odessa A'zion (/əˈzaɪɒn/ ə-ZY-on), is an American actress. On television, she is known for her roles in the CBS series Fam (2019), the Netflix series Grand Army (2020) and the HBO series I Love LA (2025). For her performance in the film Marty Supreme (2025), she was nominated for an Actor Award and a British Academy Film Award. Her other films include Hellraiser (2022), The Inhabitant (2022), Sitting in Bars with Cake (2023), Fresh Kills (2024) and Until Dawn (2025).

== Early life and education ==
Born in Sacramento, California, A'zion grew up in Los Angeles and also spent parts of her childhood in Boston, Massachusetts and Neufahrn, Germany. She is the daughter of actress Pamela Adlon and German director Felix Adlon, and sibling to Gideon Adlon. Her paternal grandfather was German filmmaker Percy Adlon and her maternal grandfather was American writer-producer Don Segall. Her maternal grandfather was Jewish, and her English-born maternal grandmother, originally an Anglican, converted to Judaism. Through her father, she is related to the German hotelier Lorenz Adlon.

A'zion attended Charter High School of the Arts (CHAMPS).

== Career ==
Initially credited as Odessa Adlon, she landed her first notable role in 2017 as Liv in season 5 of Nashville. Her film roles include the 2018 film Ladyworld and the 2020 one-shot horror film Let's Scare Julie. She appeared in two episodes of Wayne.

A'zion landed her first main role as Shannon, the younger sister of Nina Dobrev's character, in the 2019 CBS sitcom Fam. In October 2019, it was announced A'zion would star as Joey Del Marco, the lead character from Slut: The Play, in the 2020 Netflix series Grand Army. She and Odley Jean received critical acclaim for their performances.

A'zion played Lana in the 2021 independent comedy film Mark, Mary & Some Other People. This was followed in 2022 with lead roles in the Hellraiser reboot and The Inhabitant, as well as supporting roles in Am I Ok? and Good Girl Jane. She starred opposite Yara Shahidi in the 2023 comedy-drama film Sitting in Bars with Cake.

In December 2021, she was cast in Fresh Kills written and directed by Jennifer Esposito, who also stars.

A’zion plays Nina Riley in the film Until Dawn, based on the popular video game. It was released on April 25, 2025. She also appeared in the film She Rides Shotgun, a crime thriller directed by Nick Rowland, and stars in the HBO series I Love LA, created by Rachel Sennott.

In September 2024, it was reported A'zion was cast in Josh Safdie's Marty Supreme starring Timothee Chalamet, Gwyneth Paltrow and Tyler, the Creator. The film was released the following year. For her role, she was nominated at the Astra Film Award for Best Supporting Actress. At the 32nd Actor Awards, she also received nominations for Outstanding Performance by a Female Actor in a Supporting Role and Outstanding Performance by a Cast in a Motion Picture.

In January 2026, A'zion was cast in the Sean Durkin film adaptation of Deep Cuts as Zoe Gutierrez, a character written in the book as Mexican. Two days after the announcement, following backlash over the whitewashing of the character, A'zion said that she had been unaware of the character's ethnicity and backed out of the project.

== Filmography ==
=== Film ===
Year	Title	Role	Notes
2011	Conception	Interview Kid	
2018	Ladyworld	Blake	
2020	Let's Scare Julie	Madison	
2021	Supercool	Jaclyn	
2021	Mark, Mary & Some Other People	Lana	
2022	Am I OK?	Sky	
2022	Good Girl Jane	Bailey	
2022	Hellraiser	Riley McKendry	
2022	The Inhabitant	Tara Haldon	
2023	Fresh Kills	Connie	
2023	Sitting in Bars with Cake	Corinne	
2025	Until Dawn	Nina Riley	
2025	She Rides Shotgun	Charlotte	
2025	Pools	Kennedy	
2025	Marty Supreme	Rachel Mizler	
2026	Confessions II	Herself	Short film
2026	Closing Night	Lucy	
2026	Nickels	Harper Monroe	
TBA	Fonda †	TBA	Filming

=== Television ===
Year	Title	Role	Notes
2016	Better Things	Defiance	Episode: "Duke's Chorus"
2017	Nashville	Liv	5 episodes
2017	What About Barb?	Anna	Television film
2018	Love		Episode: "Stunt Show"
2019	Wayne	Trish	2 episodes
2019	Fam	Shannon	Main role
2019	Milo Murphy's Law	Orgaluth	Voice role; episode: "Sphere and Loathing in Outer Space"
2020	Day by Day	Lili	Episode: "I'm Not Done Getting To Know You"
2020	Grand Army	Joey Del Marco	Main role
2022–2025	Ghosts	Stephanie	4 episodes
2022–2025	The Tiny Chef Show	Olly	Main voice role
2025–present	I Love LA	Tallulah Stiel	Main role
2026	Stranger Things: Tales from '85	Nikki Baxter	Voice role

=== Music videos ===
Year	Title	Artist
2026	"In The Stars"	The Rolling Stones

== Awards and nominations ==
Award	Year	Category	Work	Result	Ref.
Actor Awards	2026	Outstanding Cast in a Motion Picture	Marty Supreme	Nominated	
Actor Awards	2026	Outstanding Female Actor in a Supporting Role	Marty Supreme	Nominated	
Astra Film Awards	2026	Best Supporting Actress – Comedy or Musical	Marty Supreme	Nominated	
Austin Film Critics Association	2025	Best Supporting Actress	Marty Supreme	Nominated	
Boston Society of Film Critics	2025	Best Ensemble Cast	Marty Supreme	Won	
British Academy Film Awards	2026	Best Actress in a Supporting Role	Marty Supreme	Nominated	
Cannes Film Festival	2026	Trophée Chopard - Female Revelation of the Year	—N/a	Honored	
Chicago Film Critics Association	2025	Best Supporting Actress	Marty Supreme	Nominated	
Dallas–Fort Worth Film Critics Association	2025	Best Supporting Actress	Marty Supreme	4th Place	
Georgia Film Critics Association	2025	Best Ensemble	Marty Supreme	Nominated	
Gotham TV Awards	2026	Outstanding Supporting Performance in a Comedy Series	I Love LA	Nominated	
London Film Critics Circle	2026	Supporting Actress of the Year	Marty Supreme	Nominated	
New York Film Critics Online	2025	Best Supporting Actress	Marty Supreme	Nominated	
New York Film Critics Online	2025	Best Breakthrough Performer	Marty Supreme	Nominated	
San Diego Film Critics Society	2025	Best Supporting Actress	Marty Supreme	Nominated	
Seattle Film Critics Society	2025	Best Ensemble Cast	Marty Supreme	Nominated	
Washington D.C. Area Film Critics Association	2025	Best Ensemble	Marty Supreme	Nominated	
Women Film Critics Circle	2025	Best Supporting Actress	Marty Supreme	Nominated	
