= Aoife Hinds =

British actress (born 1991)

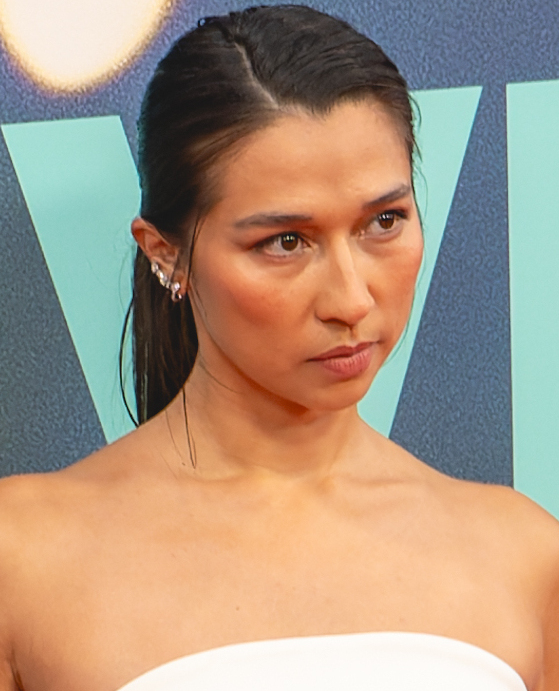
- Hinds at the 2024 BFI London Film Festival
- Born: 16 October 1991 (age 34); London, England
- Education: London School of Economics (BS); Royal Welsh College of Music and Drama (MA); Conservatoire national supérieur d'art dramatique
- Years active: 2014–present
- Father: Ciarán Hinds

Aoife Hinds (born 1991) is a British actress. On television, she is known for her roles in the BBC Three and Hulu miniseries Normal People (2020), the ITV series The Long Call (2021), and the HBO series Dune: Prophecy (2024–). Her films include Hellraiser (2022).

Hinds is the daughter of Irish actor Ciarán Hinds.

== Early life ==
Hinds was born in South London to Irish actor Ciarán Hinds and Vietnamese-born French actress Hélène Patarot. Hinds took weekend violin and piano lessons at the Guildhall School of Music and Drama. She moved to Paris at the age of 10. She graduated with a Bachelor of Science in International Relations from the London School of Economics (LSE) in 2013. She went on to graduate from the Royal Welsh College of Music & Drama in 2016 with a Master of Arts in Acting. She also trained at the Conservatoire national supérieur d'art dramatique (CNSAD) in 2017.

== Career ==
In 2018, Hinds made her feature film debut in The Commuter and her television debut in the French miniseries Immortality and with a guest appearance in an episode of the Syfy adaptation of Nightflyers. The following year, she played Ellie in the ITV series Cheat and Lyla in the science fiction series The Feed, and gained prominence through her guest role as Mae Chung in an episode of the Channel 4 sitcom Derry Girls. She starred in i will still be whole (when you rip me in half) at the Bunker Theatre.

Hinds had a recurring role as Helen Brophy, Connell's (Paul Mescal) university girlfriend, in the 2020 BBC Three and Hulu miniseries adaptation of Sally Rooney's Normal People. She also appeared in the film The Man in the Hat. In 2021, Hinds portrayed Princess Mary Tudor in the Channel 5 series Anne Boleyn and was in the main cast of the ITV crime drama The Long Call as Gaby Chadwell.

In 2022, Hinds starred in the eleventh instalment of the Hellraiser horror franchise, which was released on Hulu. She was in the original cast of the play Patriots at the Almeida Theatre and will make her West End debut when the production transfers to the Noël Coward Theatre. She also presented a television documentary titled The Brontës: An Irish Tale.

Hinds appeared in the films Cottontail and Scoop, and in HBO Max series Dune: Prophecy.

== Filmography ==
=== Film ===
Year	Title	Role	Notes
2018	The Commuter	Jeanie	
2020	The Man in the Hat	Garagista	
2022	Hellraiser	Nora	Hulu film
2023	Cottontail	Mary	
2024	Scoop	Rebecca	
2024	We Live in Time	Skye	
2025	Saipan	Karen	
2026	Digger		

=== Television ===
Year	Title	Role	Notes
2018	Immortality	Tisha	Miniseries
2018	Nightflyers	Sylvie	Episode: "Torches and Pitchforks"
2019	Cheat	Ellie	Main role
2019	Derry Girls	Mae Chung	Episode: "The Prom"
2019	The Feed	Lyla	2 episodes
2020	Normal People	Helen Brophy	4 episodes
2021	Celebrity Mastermind	Herself – Winner	1 episode
2021	Anne Boleyn	Princess Mary	Miniseries
2021	The Long Call	Gaby Chadwell	Main role
2022	The Brontës: An Irish Tale	Herself – Presenter	Documentary
2024	Dune: Prophecy	Sister Emeline	Main role
2026	Secret Service	Julia Price	
TBA	The Ministry of Time	Sophy	Main role

== Stage ==
Year	Title	Role	Notes
2014	Pacamambo	La Lune / La Mort	Festival d'Avignon
2016	En Folkefiende	Petra	Edinburgh Fringe Festival
2019	i will still be whole (when you rip me in half)	EJ	Bunker, London
2022–2023	Patriots	Various	Almeida Theatre / Noël Coward Theatre, London
