= She Rides Shotgun =

American crime thriller film

- Theatrical release poster
- Directed by: Nick Rowland
- Screenplay by: Jordan Harper; Ben Collins; Luke Piotrowski
- Based on: She Rides Shotgun by Jordan Harper
- Produced by: Brad Weston; Collin Creighton; Hiro Murai; Nate Matteson
- Starring: Taron Egerton; Ana Sophia Heger; Rob Yang; Odessa A'zion; David Lyons; John Carroll Lynch
- Cinematography: Wyatt Garfield
- Edited by: Julie Monroe
- Music by: Blanck Mass
- Production companies: Fifth Season; Makeready; Waypoint Entertainment; Super Frog
- Distributed by: Lionsgate
- Release date: August 1, 2025
- Running time: 120 minutes
- Country: United States
- Language: English

She Rides Shotgun is a 2025 American crime thriller film directed by Nick Rowland, written by Jordan Harper, Ben Collins and Luke Piotrowski, and starring Taron Egerton. It is based on Harper's 2017 novel of the same name. It was released on August 1, 2025, by Lionsgate.

== Plot ==
The film opens with a narration about a man who sees himself as a god made up of other men, tied to the violent white supremacist gang Aryan Steel. An 11-year-old girl named Polly waits for her mother outside her school. Her estranged father Nate, newly released from prison, arrives in a car and persuades her to come with him. Although Polly hesitates and asks about her mother, Nate insists everything is fine. She notices unsettling details, such as stolen belongings from her home.

At a motel, Nate cuts and dyes her hair and teaches her how to use a bat. While he is sleeping, she sees a news broadcast revealing that her mother and stepfather have been murdered and that she is listed in an Amber alert, while Nate is the main suspect linked to Aryan Steel. A conflicted Polly calls Detective John Park and reveals their location. When Nate learns of her call, he admits his lie and confesses that Aryan Steel killed her mother because of his past actions. He warns Polly that the same gang is after her as well, and Polly chooses to stay with him.

Nate brings Polly to Charlotte, an old acquaintance connected to his brother Nick. Charlotte's friend Felix, who is a member of Aryan Steel, arrives and gets into a fight with Nate, forcing Nate and Polly to leave. Lacking money, Nate decides to rob a store but gets shot in the leg. They escape an ensuing police chase and find refuge in an empty roadside trucker chapel where Nate lets Polly tend to his bullet wound. When Polly goes out alone, a corrupt police officer affiliated with Aryan Steel attempts to shoot her but Nate saves her in time. They trade their car for the officer's cruiser. Detective Park calls dispatch and traces the stolen cruiser's location to Nate and Polly, who are attempting to escape to Mexico.

Detective Park apprehends Nate, but decides not to turn him in. Suspecting Sheriff Houser of being the leader of Aryan Steel, Park convinces Nate to help him infiltrate the gang to stop Houser and the meth operation that he operates out of a trailer park named Slabtown. Nate departs for the trailer park, saying goodbye to Polly, who goes with Park. At a motel, an upset Polly storms into the bathroom and slams the door. Park's detective partner Jimmy arrives, whom Park learns is an inside asset to Aryan Steel, and Jimmy says that Houser is expecting Nate's arrival. A firefight ensues and Park wins, taking Polly along through the desert.

Nate attempts to sneak around the premises of the Slabtown trailer park, but is seen, beaten, and taken to Houser, who hangs him up by the wrists and interrogates him. Detective Park arrives with police backup, surrounding Slabtown. After a large firefight, Polly runs in to look for Nate. She frees him, but the two are confronted by Houser who beats Nate. Houser walks outside, holding Polly hostage at gunpoint and demanding that the police lower their weapons. Nate collects his strength to stab Houser, allowing Polly to get away, and tells Polly to look away before the police gun down both him and Houser.

Later Polly is seen speaking to a counselor at the police station and is then taken by Park to a foster family. She is apprehensive and quiet, still shaken by the recent events, but warms up a bit as her foster sisters invite her to play Just Dance with them. In the final scene, she dances with an expression that is hopeful yet sad, tears welling in her eyes.

== Cast ==
- Taron Egerton as Nate McClusky
- Ana Sophia Heger as Polly Huff
- Rob Yang as Detective John Park
- John Carroll Lynch as Houser
- Odessa A'zion as Charlotte
- David Lyons as Jimmy

== Production ==
In June 2023, Taron Egerton was attached to star in the film with Nick Rowland directing. Rowland revised the screenplay by Ben Collins and Luke Piotrowski, based on the novel by Jordan Harper. In October 2023, it was announced that Fifth Season would fully finance the film with Brad Weston and Collin Creighton producing for Makeready and Hiro Murai and Nate Matteson for Superfrog.

Principal photography took place in January and February 2024. Ana Sophia Heger co-stars, and the supporting cast includes Rob Yang, John Carroll Lynch, Odessa A'zion and David Lyons.

=== Music ===
The soundtrack album, composed by Blanck Mass, was released on Invada Records.

== Release and reception ==
In June 2025, Lionsgate acquired U.S. distribution rights to the film, and has released it in a limited theatrical release on August 1, 2025.

=== Critical response ===
On the review aggregator website Rotten Tomatoes, 88% of 74 critics' reviews are positive, with an average rating of 6.9/10. The website's consensus reads: "A gritty thriller grounded in powerful emotional stakes, She Rides Shotgun is harrowing but enlivened by Taron Egerton and Ana Sophia Heger's superb performances." Metacritic, which uses a weighted average, assigned the film a score of 74 out of 100, based on 12 critics, indicating "generally favorable" reviews. Movie Review wrote, "Nick Rowland's She Rides Shotgun is a gritty, emotionally charged thriller."

Ana Sophia Heger received a nomination for Best Young Performer at the 9th Astra Film Awards.
