= Censor (2021 film) =

2021 horror film

- Theatrical release poster
- Directed by: Prano Bailey-Bond
- Written by: Prano Bailey-Bond; Anthony Fletcher
- Produced by: Helen Jones
- Starring: Niamh Algar; Nicholas Burns; Vincent Franklin; Sophia La Porta; Adrian Schiller; Michael Smiley
- Cinematography: Annika Summerson
- Edited by: Mark Towns
- Music by: Emilie Levienaise-Farrouch
- Production companies: Silver Salt Films; BFI; Film4; Ffilm Cymru Wales
- Distributed by: Vertigo Releasing
- Release dates: 28 January 2021 (Sundance); 20 August 2021 (United Kingdom)
- Running time: 84 minutes
- Country: United Kingdom
- Language: English
- Box office: $465,170

Censor is a 2021 British psychological horror film directed by Prano Bailey-Bond, who co-wrote the screenplay with Anthony Fletcher. It stars Niamh Algar, Nicholas Burns, Vincent Franklin, Sophia La Porta, Adrian Schiller (in his final film appearance), and Michael Smiley.

Censor had its world premiere at the Sundance Film Festival on 28 January 2021. It received the Méliès d'Or for Best European Fantastic Film.

== Plot ==
In 1985, Enid Baines works for the British Board of Film Classification during the height of the "video nasty" controversy. Enid's co-workers call her "Little Miss Perfect" due to her insistence that violent content be cut or banned. While Enid is having dinner with her parents, they discuss Enid's sister Nina, who disappeared when the two were little. Enid's parents have since declared Nina legally dead, but Enid believes she is still alive.

Shortly after a man murders his wife and children, a tabloid newspaper links the killings to a film Enid had rated several months prior, naming her as the censor who approved it. Enid starts receiving threatening and insulting phone calls on a regular basis. One day, Enid is approached by Doug Smart, a film producer who claims veteran horror director Frederick North has personally requested she screen one of his old films, Don't Go in the Church. While watching, Enid notices that the film depicts events evocative of her memories of Nina's disappearance.

Investigating North further by acquiring a copy of one of his banned films, Enid notices that the film's lead, Alice Lee, bears a resemblance to her missing sister. Enid soon becomes obsessed with meeting North, believing that Alice is her missing sister who needs to be saved from the exploitation film industry. When Enid visits Smart, hoping to learn North's whereabouts, he tells her that North is making a sequel to Don't Go in the Church near his home, while having her drink alcohol and getting physically close to her, making Enid uncomfortable. Enid rejects Smart who becomes aggressive; Enid pushes him back and he trips and accidentally impales himself brutally on a film award. Smart dies as Enid stares in shock, thanking him for the drink before leaving.

After stealing North's address from her work, Enid finds the set of North's latest film, where he and the crew assume her to be an actress. Increasingly confusing fantasy and reality, Enid kills an actor named Charles with an axe, thinking that he was going to hurt her "sister". She then decapitates North. A terrified Alice denies that she is Enid's sister and flees from Enid as she begs for Alice to "please be her" before collapsing in the woods. A remote control appears in Enid's hand, and she presses a button.

Enid is awoken by a seemingly happy vision of her sister, thanking Enid for finding her. Nina and Enid leave the woods and drive to their parents' home. During the drive, the car radio announces that all violent films have been banned, crime has been eradicated, and unemployment no longer exists. Enid's fantasy is sporadically interrupted, revealing that she has kidnapped Alice, who is begging Enid's parents for help as Enid smiles. The camera then pans out of a TV screen, and a VHS tape with the title Censor comes out of a VCR.

== Cast ==
- Niamh Algar as Enid Baines
- Nicholas Burns as Sanderson
- Vincent Franklin as Fraser
- Sophia La Porta as Alice Lee / "Nina Baines"
- Adrian Schiller as Frederick North
- Clare Holman as June
- Andrew Havill as George
- Felicity Montagu as Valerie
- Danny Lee Wynter as Perkins
- Clare Perkins as Anne
- Guillaume Delaunay as Beastman / Charles
- Richard Glover as Gerald
- Michael Smiley as Doug Smart
- Erin Shanagher as Debbie
- Beau Gadsdon as young Enid
- Amelie Child-Villiers as young Nina
- Matthew Earley as Gordon
- Richard Renton as Frank

== Production ==
Filming mostly took place in Bradford and Leeds. The set of Gerald's Videos was created in Pudsey. The film was primarily shot on 35 mm film, with some Super 8 and VHS footage.

== Release ==
Censor had its world premiere at the 2021 Sundance Film Festival on 28 January 2021 in the Midnight section. A month later Magnolia Pictures acquired its US distribution rights, with plans to release the film through its Magnet Releasing banner in US theatres on 11 June 2021. It was released across the UK and Ireland on 20 August 2021 via Vertigo Releasing. Additionally, Metro-Goldwyn-Mayer owns the film's worldwide home media rights and international television rights, especially on Blu-ray releases in which the 2021 MGM logo is shown at the beginning and end of this film.

== Critical reception ==
On Rotten Tomatoes, the film has an approval rating of 89% based on reviews from 149 critics, with an average rating of 7.30/10. The website's critics consensus reads, "Occasionally uneven but bold and viscerally effective, Censor marks a bloody good step forward for British horror." Metacritic, which uses a weighted average, assigned the film a score of 69 out of 100, based on 26 critics, indicating "generally favorable" reviews.

Writing for RogerEbert.com, Simon Abrams concluded that "Censor is, in [a] sense, a success, if only because it winds you up, and leaves you wanting a lot more where it came from." Mark Kermode of The Observer rated the film a full five stars. Peter Bradshaw of The Guardian described the film as a "very elegant and disquieting debut" and rated the film four out of five stars. Kevin Maher of The Times called the film a "half-baked horror" that is "all context and no content" and rated the film two out of five stars.
