= Prano Bailey-Bond =

Welsh film director and writer

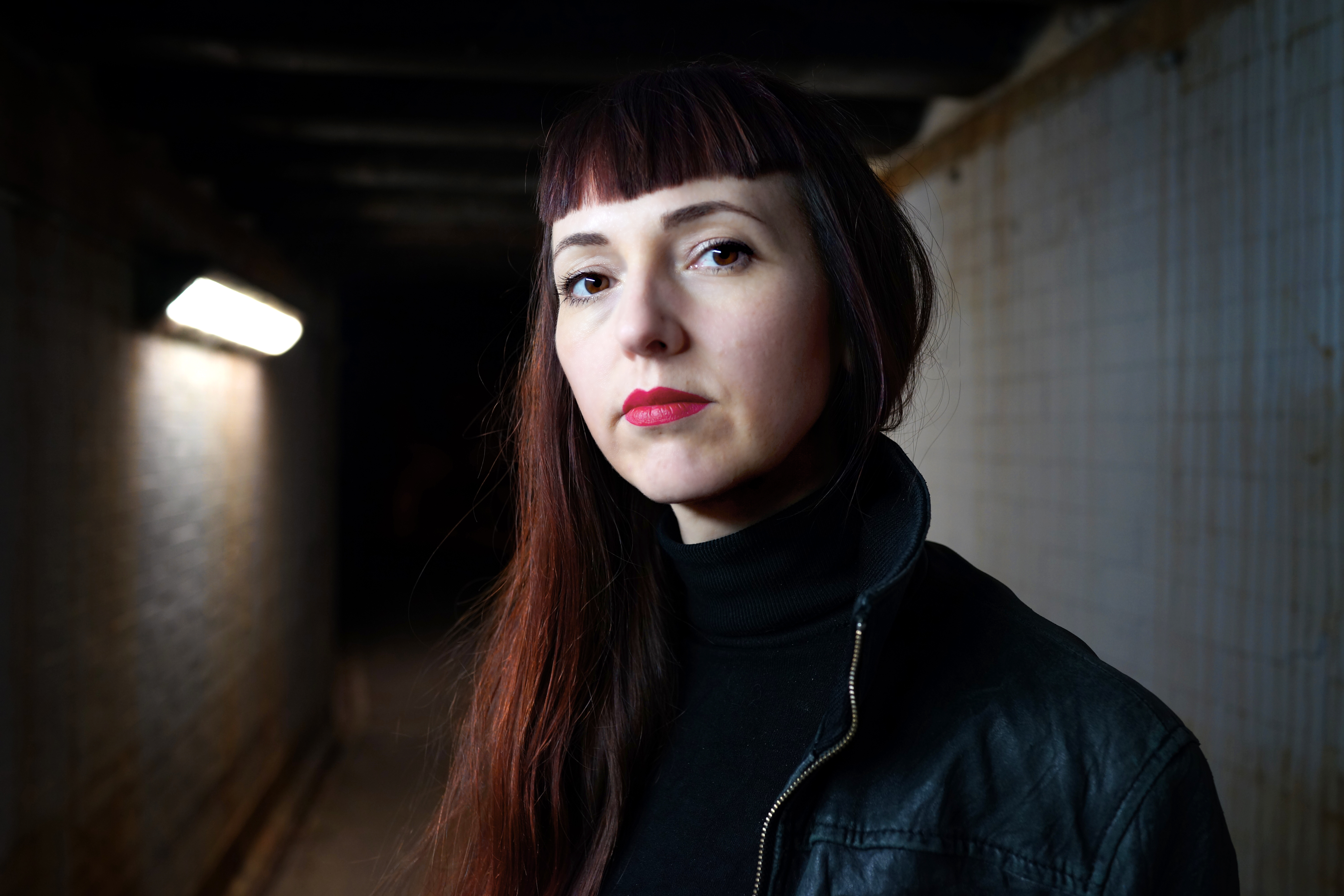
- Prano Bailey-Bond in 2021
- Born: 1982 (age 43–44)
- Occupations: Filmmaker; screenwriter
- Years active: 2012–present
- Known for: Censor

Prano Bailey-Bond (born 1982) is a Welsh film director and screenwriter. Her debut feature film, Censor, produced by BFI and Film4, premiered at 2021 Sundance Film Festival and won the Méliès d'Or for Best European Fantastic Film.

== Early life and education ==
Bailey-Bond was born and raised in Aberystwyth, Wales and grew up in Wales. Her parents had previously worked in the arts before moving to rural Wales and becoming Hindu sannyasins.

She studied at London College of Printing. After graduating, Bailey-Bond worked in post-production before moving on to direct music videos.

== Career ==
Bailey-Bond began directing with music videos and short films. Her writing and directorial feature film debut, a psychological horror film named Censor, had its world premiere at the 2021 Sundance Film Festival.

== Filmography ==
=== Shorts ===
Year	Title	Notes
2010	Short Lease	co-directed with Jennifer Eiss
2012	Man vs Sand	
2013	The Trip	
2015	Nasty	
2016	Shortcut	

=== Feature films ===
- Censor (2021) – written and directed by Bailey-Bond

== Awards ==
- 2011: Best Pop Video – Budget, 2011 UK Music Video Awards for Cool Fun's "House"
- 2011: Dirty Looks award for Best Music Short, London Short Film Festival for Cool Fun's "House"
