= Ben Collins and Luke Piotrowski =

American film screenwriters and executive producers

- Occupations: Film screenwriters; Executive producers
- Years active: 2012–present
- Notable work: Siren; The Night House; Hellraiser

Ben Collins and Luke Piotrowski are an American film screenwriting and executive producing team best known for their work in horror films, and for their collaborations with director David Bruckner, including Siren (2016), The Night House (2020), and Hellraiser (2022).

== Career ==
In October 2012, Collins and Piotrowski began their writing career by drafting the screenplay for Stephanie, which had been included in Blood List best unproduced horror scripts in Hollywood, with the film eventually released in 2017. In 2015, they wrote the screenplay for Siren and A Head Full of Ghosts. In 2017, they scripted the horror film Super Dark Times, which received positive reviews.

In October 2018, they co-executive produced the horror film Boo!, which premiered at the Brooklyn Horror Film Festival. In 2019, they gained notability from writing the screenplay and story for The Night House, which was theatrically released in 2021, to critical acclaim. In 2020, they wrote the script and story for the 2022 horror film Hellraiser. In August 2022, they wrote a screenplay based on The Registration by Madison Lawson. In June 2023, they wrote the screenplay for the 2025 thriller film She Rides Shotgun.

In February 2026, it was announced that Piotrowski would write and direct the supernatural thriller film Blasphemous, making his directorial debut.

== Filmography ==
Year	Title	Writers	Executive Producers	Ref.
2016	Siren	Yes	No	
2017	Super Dark Times	Yes	Yes	
2017	Stephanie	Yes	No	
2018	Boo!	No	Yes	
2020	The Night House	Yes	Yes	
2022	Hellraiser	Yes	No	
2025	She Rides Shotgun	Yes	No	

Consulting producers

- You Get Me (2017)

== Accolades ==
At the 2022 Fangoria Chainsaw Awards, for their work on The Night House, they won the award for "Best Screenplay".
