= Sonny Mallhi =

American film director

Sonny Mallhi (born May 5, 1972, in Chicago, Illinois) is an American film producer, writer, and director. His directorial debut film Anguish was released in 2015. His next two films, Family Blood and Hurt (both produced by Blumhouse Productions) was released in 2018.

== Filmography ==
Year	Title	Director	Writer	Producer	Notes
2006	The Lake House	No	No	co-producer	
2007	Dead Daughters	No	No	No	Special thanks
2008	Shutter	No	No	executive	
2008	The Strangers	No	No	executive	
2009	Possession	No	No	executive	
2011	The Roommate	No	Yes	executive	
2011	The Resident	No	No	No	Personal thanks
2012	House at the End of the Street	No	No	executive	
2013	Crush	No	Yes	executive	
2013	Oldboy	No	No	co-producer	
2014	At the Devil's Door	No	No	Yes	
2015	Anguish	Yes	Yes	Yes	
2016	The Monster	No	No	executive	
2017	In the Radiant City	No	No	Yes	
2018	Family Blood	Yes	Yes	No	Co-wrote with Nick Savvides
2019	Trespassers	No	No	executive	
2019	Killerman	No	No	No	Very special thanks
2020	The Dark and the Wicked	No	No	Yes	
2021	Hurt	Yes	Yes	Yes	Co-wrote with Solomon Gray
