= The Roommate =

2011 film by Christian E. Christiansen

- Theatrical release poster
- Directed by: Christian E. Christiansen
- Written by: Sonny Mallhi
- Produced by: Roy Lee; Doug Davison
- Starring: Leighton Meester; Minka Kelly; Cam Gigandet; Aly Michalka; Danneel Harris; Frances Fisher; Billy Zane
- Cinematography: Phil Parmet
- Edited by: Randy Bricker
- Music by: John Frizzell
- Production companies: Screen Gems; Vertigo Entertainment
- Distributed by: Sony Pictures Releasing
- Release date: February 4, 2011
- Running time: 91 minutes
- Country: United States
- Language: English
- Budget: $16 million
- Box office: $52.5 million

The Roommate is a 2011 American psychological thriller film directed by Christian E. Christiansen and written by Sonny Mallhi. The film stars Leighton Meester, Minka Kelly, Cam Gigandet, Aly Michalka, Danneel Harris, Frances Fisher, and Billy Zane, and follows Sara Matthews (Kelly), a college freshman whose roommate, Rebecca Evans (Meester), is dangerously obsessed with her.

The Roommate was released in the United States on February 4, 2011, by Sony Pictures Releasing. The film was successful at the box office but panned by critics, with the film served as a unofficial remake of Single White Female (1992).

== Plot ==
Sara Matthews is starting her freshman year of college in Los Angeles. She meets party girl Tracy, frat boy Stephen—her love interest—and Rebecca, her wealthy but shy college roommate who bears an uncanny resemblance to her. The girls begin to bond and Rebecca learns that Sara had an older sister, Emily, who died when Sara was nine, and an ex-boyfriend, Jason, who keeps calling her in attempts to reconcile.

Over time, Rebecca's obsession with Sara grows, which causes her to drive away anyone who could come between them. Claiming that she is a bad influence, Rebecca attacks Tracy in the shower, pins her down, rips out her belly button ring, and threatens to kill her unless she stays away from Sara. Tracy moves to another dorm, fearful of Rebecca. An old friend of Sara's named Irene invites Sara to move in with her when Sara's cat Cuddles is discovered by an RA. Rebecca kills Cuddles, lying to Sara that the cat ran away, inflicts injuries upon herself, and says she was assaulted by a thug.

Feeling sympathetic, Sara decides to spend Thanksgiving with Rebecca. When Sara's fashion design professor, Roberts, kisses her, Rebecca plans to get the professor out of the picture by seducing him while recording their dialogue on a tape recorder to make it sound like he was trying to rape her. During her Thanksgiving stay, Sara overhears a conversation between Rebecca and her father, hinting Rebecca has had trouble making friends in the past. After Rebecca's mother mentions that Rebecca is supposed to be taking medication, Sara and Stephen find a bottle of unused Zyprexa pills, used to treat schizophrenia or bipolar disorder.

Sara decides to move in with Irene; however, that evening at a club, Rebecca seduces Irene and they go back to Irene's place. The following morning, Sara goes to Irene's apartment, but she is not there. Meanwhile, Rebecca gets Sara's sister's name tattooed in the same place on her breast as Sara. Alarmed, Sara finally realizes Rebecca is obsessed with her and removes her belongings from the dorm. Jason arrives at Sara's dorm and slips a note under her door, saying that he wants to see her. Rebecca intercepts it, and disguises herself as Sara. She then goes to Jason's hotel room and stabs him to death.

Sara receives a text message from Irene saying she needs to meet with her right away, and she calls Stephen so he can meet her there. She arrives and finds a gagged Irene handcuffed to the bed. Rebecca reveals herself and points a gun at Sara, proclaiming her love and loyalty, before tearfully revealing she was responsible for what happened to Tracy, Cuddles, Professor Roberts, Irene, and Jason, and that she did it all to win Sara's friendship.

Rebecca moves to smother Irene, and Sara attempts to stop her. Sara tries to call for help, but the phone is dead. Bound and helpless, Irene pleads for Sara to save herself. Sara tries to get out the window to get help. Rebecca breaks back into the room and aims the gun at the cuffed and helpless Irene, only to be stopped by Stephen who briefly disarms her but is knocked unconscious. Climbing back into the room, Sara is strangled by an enraged Rebecca. While choking, Sara stabs Rebecca with a box cutter, killing her after saying "You were never my friend".

Sara moves back into her dorm and moves the extra bed out of her room with the help of Stephen, proclaiming that she does not want anyone as a roommate for a while.

== Cast ==
- Leighton Meester as Rebecca Evans
- Minka Kelly as Sara Matthews
- Cam Gigandet as Stephen
- Danneel Harris as Irene Crew
- Matt Lanter as Jason Tanner
- Nina Dobrev as Maria
- Aly Michalka as Tracy Long
- Kat Graham as Kim Johnson
- Cherilyn Wilson as Landi Rham
- Billy Zane as Professor Roberts
- Frances Fisher as Alison Evans
- Tomas Arana as Jeff Evans
- Alex Meraz as Frat boy
- Nathan Parsons as Cashier Boy

== Production ==
Sonny Mallhi first thought of shooting the film in New York City but it was eventually shot on location at the University of Southern California in Los Angeles and at Loyola Marymount University. Leighton Meester was originally set to play Sara but was replaced by Minka Kelly and Leighton played Rebecca. Billy Zane and Frances Fisher had both starred together in Titanic fourteen years earlier, though in this film they share no scenes.

== Reception ==
=== Critical response ===
The Roommate was widely panned by critics. On Rotten Tomatoes, the film holds an approval rating of 3% based on 88 reviews, with an average rating of 2.9/10. The website's critics' consensus reads: "Devoid of chills, thrills, or even cheap titillation, The Roommate isn't even bad enough to be good." On Metacritic, it has a weighted average score of 23 out of 100, based on 16 critics, indicating "generally unfavorable reviews". Audiences polled by CinemaScore gave the film an average grade of "B−" on an A+ to F scale.

Keith Staskiewicz of Entertainment Weekly gave the film a D, saying it "is really just a far-below-par thriller that desperately wishes it were a different movie – a longing it shares with the audience," but praises Meester for bringing "the slightest trace of something fascinating to her role. When she smiles, it's perfectly located between a sweet display of affection and a snarling warning." Peter Travers of Rolling Stone gave it a half star, stating that "The Roommate – the umpteenth uncredited remake of 1992's Single White Female – sucks bad, real bad" and that "Danish director Christian E. Christiansen has no flair for suspense". Meester's performance garnered praise from other top critics, including the Los Angeles Times, which states: "Here, her performance often has the feeling of a sports car in neutral. When she punches it for quick changes of tone from manic to wounded or around the bend, she shows how much more she is capable of."

=== Box office ===
Opening in 2,534 theaters, the film grossed $15.6 million on its opening weekend to take first place at the box office. Its distributor estimated that females under the age of 21 accounted for two-thirds of its audience. By the end of its run, the film grossed $37.3 million in the United States and Canada and $15.2 million in other countries for a worldwide total of $52.5 million.

=== Accolades ===
Award	Category	Recipient	Result	Refs
MTV Movie Award	Best Scared-As-Sh– Performance	Minka Kelly	Nominated	
MTV Movie Award	Best Villain	Leighton Meester	Nominated	
Teen Choice Award	Choice Movie: Villain	Leighton Meester	Nominated	
Teen Choice Award	Choice Movie: Female Scene Stealer	Aly Michalka	Nominated	
Teen Choice Award	Choice Movie Actress: Drama	Minka Kelly	Nominated	
Teen Choice Award	Choice Movie Actor: Drama	Cam Gigandet	Nominated	
Teen Choice Award	Choice Movie: Drama	The Roommate	Nominated	

== Use of a photo featuring a Southwestern College building ==
Some of the promotional posters and displays for the film used the Christy Administration Building from Southwestern College in Winfield, Kansas as its backdrop. The college administration voiced concern that permission to use the photograph of the building was not properly obtained and investigated the legality of its use.

Primary concerns hinged that the image of the college (particularly the image of the building) could be damaged, while other concerns were that the college's primary iconic image was being used for the promotion of an unrelated business venture.

Though the film successfully earned $15.6 million in receipts to top the box office during its debut weekend in the United States, concerns continued. By that time, the image of the building had been replaced on the film's official website and on subsequent promotional material. The photo of the building reportedly was licensed from iStockPhoto based in Calgary, Alberta. No lawsuits were filed, but discussions took place.

Students at the school reported "mixed feelings" about the topic – some believed that it may have been helpful for the college and others reported that they saw how it could have been harmful to the school's image.

== Home media ==
The Roommate was released on Blu-ray and DVD on May 17, 2011.
