= Hurt (2018 film) =

- Theatrical release poster
- Directed by: Sonny Mallhi
- Written by: Solomon Gray; Sonny Mallhi
- Produced by: Robert Menzies; Sonny Mallhi
- Starring: Emily van Raay; Andrew Creer
- Cinematography: Jorel Odell
- Edited by: Jordan Jensen
- Music by: Tom Schraeder; Cj Johnson
- Production companies: Blumhouse Productions; Shotgun Shack Productions; Zed.Film Production; Ten Thirty One Productions; Eggplant Pictures
- Distributed by: Gravitas Ventures
- Release dates: July 26, 2018 (Fantasia); December 10, 2021
- Running time: 93 minutes
- Country: United States
- Language: English

Hurt is a 2018 American slasher film directed by Sonny Mallhi and written by Solomon Gray and Mallhi. The film stars Emily van Raay and Andrew Creer.

It had its world premiere at the Fantasia International Film Festival on July 26, 2018. It was released on December 10, 2021 by Gravitas Ventures.

== Plot ==
Rose moves into a house in the woods close to her sister after her boyfriend gets deployed and things do not go right when Halloween night arrives.

== Cast ==
- Emily van Raay as Rose
- Andrew Creer as Tommy
- Michelle Treacy as Dana
- Stephanie Moran as Lily
- Bradley Hamilton as Mark
- Madelaine Gionet as Natalie

== Filming ==
Principal photography on the film began in May 2017.

== Release ==
It had its world premiere at the Fantasia International Film Festival on July 26, 2018. It was released on December 10, 2021 by Gravitas Ventures.

== Reception ==
=== Critical response ===
Hurt has an approval rating of 71% on review aggregator website Rotten Tomatoes, based on 7 reviews, and an average rating of 5.9/10.

== See also ==
- List of films set around Halloween
- Holiday horror
