= Stephanie (film) =

2017 American supernatural horror film directed by Akiva Goldsman

- Promotional release poster
- Directed by: Akiva Goldsman
- Written by: Ben Collins; Luke Piotrowski
- Produced by: Jason Blum; Ellen Goldsmith-Vein; Adrienne Biddle; Matt Kaplan
- Starring: Frank Grillo; Anna Torv; Shree Crooks
- Cinematography: Antonio Riestra
- Edited by: Wayne Wahrman; Timothy Alverson
- Music by: Nathan Whitehead
- Production companies: Blumhouse Productions; Gotham Group
- Distributed by: Universal Pictures
- Release dates: April 27, 2017 (Overlook Film Festival); April 17, 2018
- Running time: 86 minutes
- Country: United States
- Language: English

Stephanie is a 2017 American supernatural horror film directed by Akiva Goldsman and written by Ben Collins and Luke Piotrowski. It stars Frank Grillo, Anna Torv and Shree Crooks.

The film had its world premiere at the Overlook Film Festival on April 27, 2017. It was released through video on demand on April 17, 2018, by Universal Pictures.

== Plot ==
Stephanie is a young girl who was abandoned by her parents in their home. With only a toy turtle, Frances, to talk to, there is also a dark supernatural force watching over her. An apocalyptic event is alluded to on various news broadcasts, but Stephanie channel-surfs past them to watch Despereaux, Equestria Girls, and Friendship is Magic. It is revealed that she is keeping the corpse of her brother, Paul, in his bed to occasionally yell at and physically abuse. After they make up, she sometimes holds his cold hand, which squeezes hers back. As she does whimsical things like tea parties with stuffed animals, a shadowy figure will menace her, but the scene will end with a jump scare of her waking up in her bed. Stephanie's parents, Eric and Jane, eventually return and apologize for leaving her. They bury Paul's corpse in the yard and attempt to resume a normal life. Eric keeps a gun in his belt at all times. Jane has large scars across her stomach. That night, Paul's corpse is catapulted through the attic window, causing distress to Eric and Jane, but leaving Stephanie unaffected.

The next morning, Eric asks her to tell them about the day they left. Stephanie and Paul had been carving pumpkins. When Paul teased her and damaged her pumpkin, she broke his neck with her telekinesis. When Jane came to investigate, she was struck across the midsection. Stephanie's telekinesis takes the form of giant invisible octopus tentacles.

Eric and Jane reveal there is no monster: the monster is Stephanie. She was hallucinating the shadowy figure that had been harassing her. Her parents drug her and attempt to perform brain surgery to nullify her powers. Stephanie wakes up and telekinetically destroys the lab. News broadcasts explain that the apocalyptic event is that murderous, telekinetic children like Stephanie have been appearing all over the world, and there is no cure for their powers or murderous urges, meaning they must be killed. Stephanie acts as if nothing has happened the next morning. Eric and Jane poison some hot cocoa intended for her. Eric explains his theory that a force is possessing Stephanie and the other children. When in this state, Stephanie occasionally develops dark patches on her face, lending credence to this theory. Stephanie prepares to drink the cocoa, but her telekinesis autonomously knocks it out of her hand. Despite her trying to control it, she subconsciously moves to attack Eric, and he shoots her several times, seemingly killing her.

Stephanie returns home, unharmed, and tells her parents they should've never come back. Her telekinetic tenticles kill Jane by breaking all of her bones, and kill Eric by cutting his spine with a kitchen knife. She telekinetically destroys the house and walks outside, picking up her toy turtle, telekinetically dragging her parents’ corpses and leaving them at Paul's grave. She then drops and steps on her toy turtle, presumably showing that she is now possessed by the force, and silently destroys all the other houses in the neighborhood. Her shadow is shown to have long tentacles.

The movie ends by zooming out to show the Earth. There are fires all over with plenty of destruction of world landmarks during the end credits, showing that the other telekinetic children are similarly wreaking destruction around the world ahead of Stephanie.

== Cast ==
- Frank Grillo as Dad, Eric
- Anna Torv as Mom, Jane
- Shree Crooks as Stephanie
- Jonah Beres as Paul
- Lausaundra Gibson as TV Reporter
- Samantha Smith as Doctor
- Harold Perrineau as Leader (uncredited)

== Production ==
Deadline announced that Akiva Goldsman signed on to direct the film and that Blumhouse Productions, Gotham Group, Unbroken Pictures and Matt Kaplan with Chapter One Films would produce. Jason Blum with Blumhouse Productions had a deal with Universal so the film would go through them for distribution. The film was written by Ben Collins and Luke Piotrowski.

== Release ==
The film had its world premiere at the Overlook Film Festival on April 27, 2017. It was released through video on demand on April 17, 2018, before being released through DVD on May 1, 2018.

=== Critical reception ===
Film review aggregator Rotten Tomatoes reports an approval rating of 33% based on 6 reviews.

== See also ==
- Mama (2013 film)
- "It's a Good Life" (The Twilight Zone)
- The Midwich Cuckoos, John Wyndham novel
- Village of the Damned (1960 film) and Village of the Damned (1995 film), films based on the John Wyndham novel
