= Elizabeth Cappuccino =

American actress

- Born: October 30, 1994 (age 31); Buffalo, New York
- Education: New York University
- Occupation: Actor

Elizabeth Cappuccino is an American film and television actress. She is best known for starring in Super Dark Times and for playing a young Jessica Jones in the Netflix series of the same name.

== Family and early life ==
Cappuccino was born on October 30, 1994, to parents Andrew and Helen. She has five siblings. Her parents are physicians in the Buffalo, NY area. She went to high school at Nichols School, graduating in 2013. Cappuccino attended the Tisch School of the Arts at New York University, graduating in 2017.

== Acting career ==
Cappuccino's career began while she was still in high school, in the television program Deception, in which she had a recurring role. She continued to be cast while attending NYU, including in Jessica Jones, Broad City and her first feature film, Super Dark Times. Cappuccino has spoken of the challenges presented by meeting the simultaneous demands of a full-time academic curriculum and her acting work in these productions as well as several TV movies and shorts.

Cappuccino received praise for her performance in Super Dark Times and has since been featured in Orange is the New Black, in the film Otherhood opposite Angela Bassett, and in the television series Next, in a recurring role as John Slattery's daughter.

== Personal life ==
Cappuccino's family has several other film and Hollywood connections as well: her parents have executive-produced several films, and her brother, Mac, is a producer in Hollywood. Cappuccino lives in New York City.
