= The Night House (2020 film) =

2020 film directed by David Bruckner

- Theatrical release poster
- Directed by: David Bruckner
- Written by: Ben Collins; Luke Piotrowski
- Produced by: David S. Goyer; Keith Levine; John Zois
- Starring: Rebecca Hall; Sarah Goldberg; Evan Jonigkeit; Stacy Martin; Vondie Curtis-Hall
- Cinematography: Elisha Christian
- Edited by: David Marks
- Music by: Ben Lovett
- Production companies: Anton; Phantom Four Films
- Distributed by: Searchlight Pictures
- Release dates: January 24, 2020 (Sundance); August 20, 2021 (United States)
- Running time: 110 minutes
- Countries: United States; United Kingdom
- Language: English
- Budget: $12 million
- Box office: $15.5 million

The Night House is a 2020 supernatural psychological horror film directed by David Bruckner, and written by Ben Collins and Luke Piotrowski. It stars Rebecca Hall as a widow who discovers a dark secret about the house her recently deceased architect husband built. Other cast members are Sarah Goldberg, Evan Jonigkeit, Stacy Martin, and Vondie Curtis-Hall.

It premiered at the Sundance Film Festival on January 24, 2020, and was theatrically released in the United States on August 20, 2021, by Searchlight Pictures. It received positive reviews and was nominated for several awards, including Saturn Award for Best Horror Film.

== Plot ==
Beth has just lost her husband Owen to suicide. Devastated, she spends her nights drinking and going through Owen's belongings. Her friend Claire and neighbour Mel are concerned for her. Owen's ominous suicide note—"You were right. There is nothing. Nothing is after you. You're safe now."—perplexes her. She begins to suffer from strange supernatural events at night and finds a strange reversed floor plan for their house.

One night, she discovers a photo on his phone of a woman who looks similar to her, and suspects Owen was having an affair. A drunken Beth reveals to Claire that she had been clinically dead for four minutes after a car accident years ago and saw that there was nothing when she died. Owen had always disagreed with this and was close to changing her mind before he died. That night, she is awakened by a supernatural presence and witnesses several frightened women fleeing through the woods and jumping into the lake. She finds blood on the boat where Owen shot himself and feels an invisible presence.

Crossing the lake to investigate a strange set of lights, she discovers a reversed copy of her house and sees ghostly figures of women with Owen. She passes out and awakens in her own house. She finds the reversed house again, although this time it is unfinished and empty. She retrieves a strange statue from it and confronts Mel, who claims he never saw the house but once saw Owen in the woods at night with a woman who looked like Beth. Searching Owen's laptop, she finds more photos of women who look similar to her, identifies the statue from one of his books as an occult doll, and determines that Owen was trying to learn how to trick and trap demonic entities.

Beth finds the bookstore where Owen bought the books and encounters Madelyne, one of the women from Owen's photos, who denies sleeping with him. Madelyne tells Beth how Owen had invited her to the reverse house. He kissed her, then attempted to choke her, but apologized after she panicked, and drove her back home. A drunk Beth visits the reverse house, and under the floorboards finds the corpses of the women Owen had photographed.

The invisible force manifests physical signs of itself, as it caresses Beth. Mistaking it for Owen's spirit, she hugs it back. The spirit is not Owen; and it violently shows her visions of Owen murdering the Beth lookalikes. Using Owen's likeness to communicate "Nothing" is revealed to be a manifestation of Death itself, which tried to convince Owen to return Beth to the afterlife by killing her. Owen's construction of the reverse house and murder of the lookalikes tricked death, though only temporarily. In response to her previously escaping it in her near-death experience, and having driven Owen to suicide, it is now stalking Beth directly. It traps her in a position like the statue she had retrieved earlier.

In the morning, Claire arrives and sees evidence of a fight in the house. She rushes out to the dock with Mel, where they find Beth out in the boat with Owen's gun. In Nothing's dimension, the entity tries to convince Beth to join it by killing herself, but Beth puts the gun down, deciding not to commit suicide. As soon as she moves the gun away from herself, she returns to the real world, where Claire is swimming toward the boat to save her. Once ashore, Beth sees the outline of the entity in the boat. Mel says, "There's nothing there," to which Beth replies, "I know".

== Symbolism ==
The living room of the first house is adorned in Welsh tapestry, the reversed house was designed in such a way which resembled a Caerdroia; a maze found in Welsh mythology, the Caerdroia's intention is to trap bad spirits within the house.

== Cast ==
- Rebecca Hall as Beth Parchin
- Sarah Goldberg as Claire
- Vondie Curtis-Hall as Mel
- Evan Jonigkeit as Owen Parchin
- Stacy Martin as Madelyne
- David Abeles as Gary
- Samantha Buck as Becky McLaughlin

== Production ==
In February 2019, it was announced that Rebecca Hall would star in the film, with David Bruckner directing from a screenplay by Ben Collins and Luke Piotrowski, and that David S. Goyer would produce. Principal photography began in May 2019 in Syracuse, New York.

== Release ==
The Night House premiered at the Sundance Film Festival on January 24, 2020, and shortly thereafter, Searchlight Pictures acquired distribution rights. It was scheduled to be released on July 16, 2021, then rescheduled for August 20, 2021.

=== Home media ===
The film was released on digital platforms on October 5, 2021, with selected streaming on Amazon Prime Video. It was released on Blu-ray and DVD on October 19, 2021, by Walt Disney Studios Home Entertainment. One of the bonus features of the Blu-ray and DVD release is a behind-the-scenes featurette, What Happens at the Lake House?.

== Reception ==
=== Box office ===
As of February 27, 2022, The Night House has grossed $7.1 million in the United States and Canada, and $8.4 million in other territories, for a worldwide total of $15.5 million.

In the United States and Canada, it was released paired with Reminiscence, PAW Patrol: The Movie, The Protégé, and the limited release of Flag Day. It was projected to gross $2–3 million from 2,150 theaters in its opening weekend. It made $1.1 million its first day and went on to debut to $2.9 million, finishing eighth at the box office. It fell 57% in its second weekend to $1.2 million.

=== Critical response ===
According to review aggregator Rotten Tomatoes, 88% of 209 critics have given the film a positive review, with an average rating of 7.1/10. The website's critics consensus reads, "Led by Rebecca Hall's gripping central performance, The Night House offers atmospheric horror that engages intellectually as well as emotionally." On Metacritic, another aggregator, the film has a weighted average score of 68 out of 100 based on 36 critics, indicating "generally favorable reviews". Audiences polled by CinemaScore gave the film an average grade of "C−" on an A+ to F scale, while PostTrak reported 61% of audience members gave it a positive score, with 38% saying they would definitely recommend it.

Rotten Tomatoes reported that critics found The Night House, "a thoughtful horror film that does a good job upending viewer expectations," and that it "benefits from a stunning central performance from Hall." Reviewing the film for Deadline Hollywood, Todd McCarthy praised Hall's work, saying, "The sheer intelligence and fortitude that emanate from Hall lend her struggle a measure of weight for a while as she tries to wrestle the busy demons to the ground;" though he noted that "[the] closer the film gets to having to resolve itself and make Beth's obsession pay off, the less credible and the more contrived it becomes." Similarly, David Rooney of The Hollywood Reporter praised Hall's "admirable refusal to soften the brittle edges of her recently widowed protagonist," and wrote, "There are interesting twists on the standard haunting narrative here, but the writing is too muddled to clarify them, instead veering into chaotic mayhem as Beth faces down the sinister forces that plagued her husband in a violent denouement." Clarisse Loughrey of The Independent gave the film a score of 4/5 stars, and wrote, "Whatever small contrivances or inconsistencies might dwell in The Night House's story of a husband's secrets and the home they dwell within, they melt away as soon as the camera cuts to the face of its star."

The film ranks on Rotten Tomatoes' Best Horror Movies of 2021.

=== Accolades ===
Award	Date of ceremony	Category	Recipient(s)	Result	Ref.
Hollywood Critics Association Film Awards	February 28, 2022	Best Horror	The Night House	Nominated	
Critics' Choice Super Awards	March 17, 2022	Best Horror Movie	The Night House	Nominated	
Critics' Choice Super Awards	March 17, 2022	Best Actress in a Horror Movie	Rebecca Hall	Nominated	
Fangoria Chainsaw Awards	May 16, 2022	Best Limited-Release Movie	The Night House	Nominated	
Fangoria Chainsaw Awards	May 16, 2022	Best Director	David Bruckner	Nominated	
Fangoria Chainsaw Awards	May 16, 2022	Best Lead Performance	Rebecca Hall	Nominated	
Fangoria Chainsaw Awards	May 16, 2022	Best Screenplay	Ben Collins and Luke Piotrowski	Won	
Fangoria Chainsaw Awards	May 16, 2022	Best Score	Ben Lovett	Nominated	
Saturn Awards	October 25, 2022	Best Horror Film	The Night House	Nominated	
