= David Bruckner =

American film director

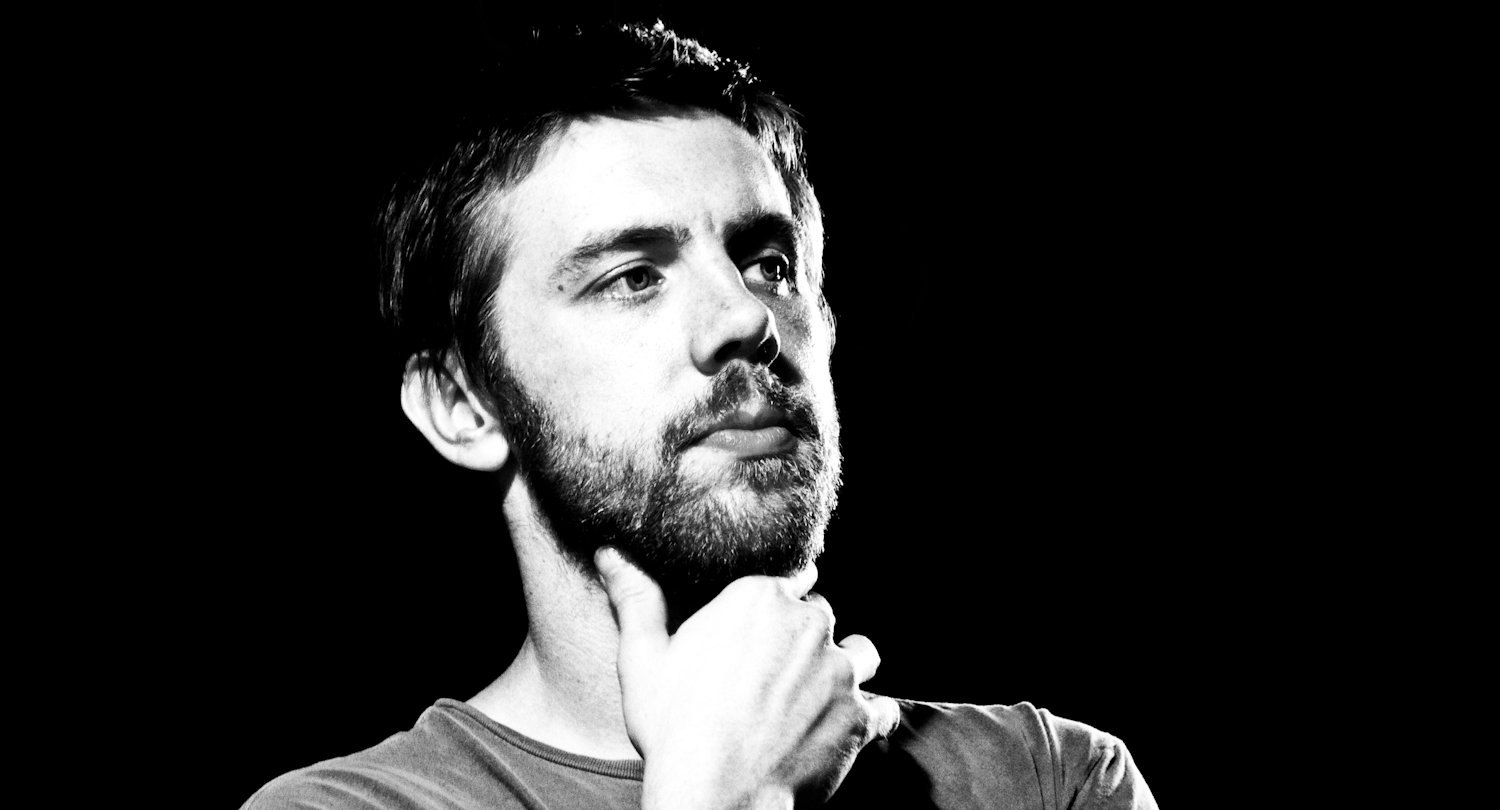
- Bruckner in 2009
- Born: 1977 or 1978 (age 48–49)
- Occupation: Film director
- Known for: The Signal; V/H/S; The Ritual; The Night House

David Bruckner (born 1977 or 1978) is an American film director, producer, screenwriter and editor. With Jacob Gentry and Dan Bush, he co-wrote and co-directed the 2007 horror film The Signal. Bruckner also co-wrote and directed the "Amateur Night" segment of the 2012 horror anthology film V/H/S, as well as directed the 2017 film The Ritual and the 2020 film The Night House.

== Early life ==
Bruckner grew up in Atlanta, Georgia. His father is a police detective and his mother an emergency room nurse. He attended the University of Georgia along with A. J. Bowen and Jacob Gentry. The three would later collaborate with Dan Bush on The Signal (2007).

== Career ==
With Jacob Gentry and Dan Bush, Bruckner co-wrote and co-directed The Signal. The filmmakers used their connections in Atlanta to compose a crew. The concept came from a Surrealist game called exquisite corpse, in which multiple people collaborate in order to complete an art project. When Gentry was unable to contribute to the horror anthology V/H/S (2012), he suggested Bruckner, who eventually co-wrote and directed the segment "Amateur Night". Also released in 2012, his short film Talk Show addresses the torture debate in mainstream media. Bruckner was set to direct a reboot of Friday the 13th for Paramount Pictures but was reported to have left in late 2015. His film Southbound premiered at the 2015 Toronto International Film Festival and was picked up for distribution by the Orchard for release in 2016.

In 2016, he was an executive producer on Siren, which was based on his V/H/S segment "Amateur Night". In 2017, he released his first solo directed feature, The Ritual, based on the horror novel by Adam Nevill. The film premiered at the Toronto Film Festival, and was released by Netflix. He also directed and produced the horror-thriller The Night House, starring Rebecca Hall. Theatrically released on August 20, 2021, the film was acclaimed by critics. His latest film was a reboot of Hellraiser, starring Jamie Clayton as the lead Cenobite Pinhead. In March 2024, Bruckner was involved in developments for a Hellraiser sequel.

== Awards and nominations ==
In 2008, Bruckner was nominated for the Independent Spirit John Cassavetes Award along with Gentry and Bush for The Signal.

== Filmography ==
Year	Title	Director	Producer	Writer	Editor	Notes
2007	The Signal	Yes	No	Yes	Yes	segment Crazy in Love
2011	Talk Show	Yes	Yes	Yes	Yes	short film
2012	V/H/S	Yes	Segment	Yes	Yes	segment Amateur Night
2015	Southbound	Yes	Segment	Yes	Yes	segment The Accident
2016	Siren	No	Executive	Yes	No	based on Amateur Night
2017	The Ritual	Yes	No	No	No	
2020	The Night House	Yes	Executive	No	No	
2021	No One Gets Out Alive	No	Executive	No	No	
2021	V/H/S/94	No	Executive	Story	No	
2022	V/H/S/99	No	Yes	No	No	
2022	Hellraiser	Yes	No	No	No	
2023	V/H/S/85	Yes	Yes	No	No	frame segment Total Copy
