= My Super Psycho Sweet 16 (film series) =

- Written by: Scott Thomas; Jed Elinoff
- Directed by: Jacob Gentry
- Composer: Ben Lovett
- Country of origin: United States
- Original language: English

Production
- Executive producers: Chris Linn (1–3); Maggie Malina (1–3); Alexander A. Motlagh (2–3)
- Producers: Alexander A. Motlagh (1); Scott Thomas (2–3); Jed Elinoff (2–3); Christopher White (3)
- Cinematography: Thomas C. Bingham (1); Eric Maddison (2–3)
- Editor: Matt Blundell
- Running time: 251 minutes
- Production companies: In Cahoots Media, Inc.; The Popfilms Movie Company; MTV Production Development

Original release
- Network: MTV
- Release: October 23, 2009 – March 13, 2012

My Super Psycho Sweet 16 is an American slasher television film series, produced by MTV. Each of the series' three films follows Skye Rotter, a teenaged outcast, and her friends who are stalked and murdered by a psychopath during a sweet sixteen birthday party.

== Background ==
Director Jacob Gentry worked on the film with his long-time friend Alex Motlagh. Gentry was not a fan of reality shows, figuring they are "the lowest form of entertainment you have". But once he started watching the series My Super Sweet 16 that the producers were trying to base the first film on, he had a realization that it's the perfect scenario for a horror film. Gentry went on to say he's aware that the film "is clearly in the "slasher genre" where there are rules viewers expect will be followed. It's like playing the blues, you want to give it your spin but you don't want to interrupt the formula too much. You still have to play the blues. In this case, we don't want to reinvent the wheel".

== Films ==
Film	U.S. release date	Director(s)	Screenwriter(s)	Producer(s)
My Super Psycho Sweet 16	October 23, 2009	Jacob Gentry	Scott Thomas & Jed Elinoff	Alexander A. Motlagh
My Super Psycho Sweet 16: Part 2	October 22, 2010	Jacob Gentry	Scott Thomas & Jed Elinoff	Scott Thomas & Jed Elinoff
My Super Psycho Sweet 16: Part 3	March 13, 2012	Jacob Gentry	Scott Thomas & Jed Elinoff	Christopher White, Scott Thomas & Jed Elinoff

=== My Super Psycho Sweet 16 (2009) ===
Madison Penrose, spoiled throughout her life, convinces her rich parents to re-open a nearby rollerdome for her Sweet 16 birthday party. The rollerdome once closed because a series of brutal murders took place at the locale, and, of course, the killer returns to wreak havoc during her party.

Birthday Theme: Madison Penrose (Julianna Guill).

=== My Super Psycho Sweet 16: Part 2 (2010) ===
Skye Rotter is on the run, having fled the Roller Dome massacre from the end of the first movie. With nowhere left to turn, Skye heads to the quiet town of Mill Basin and the mother who abandoned her years ago. There, she meets her younger half-sister Alex and Alex's manipulative best friend Zoe. Skye hopes she's finally found safety in her new family, but she's about to learn she can't outrun her past. While her friends Brigg and Derek desperately try to locate her, the same psycho from the first film comes to town with one bloody mission: to turn Skye's upcoming birthday into a Sweet 16 she'll never forget, turning a weekend rager into the savage setting.

Birthday Theme: Skye Rotter (Lauren McKnight).

=== My Super Psycho Sweet 16: Part 3 (2012) ===
Having endured the torment of high school and survived the bloodbath at the Rollerdome, Skye Rotter is ready to break free of "Psycho Skye" and head to college for a new life. But before Skye can truly escape her dark past, there's still one last party she has to attend - her estranged sister Alex is having her Sweet 16, and someone has made certain the Lord of the Rink's bloody legacy lives on. One way or another, the party will end here.

Birthday Theme: Alex Bell (Kirsten Prout).

== Cast and crew ==
=== Principal cast ===
Key
- A ^{C} indicates a cameo role
- A ^{U} indicates an uncredited appearance.
- A ^{Y} indicates the actor portrayed the role of a younger version of the character.
- A dark gray cell indicates the character was not in the film.

Characters	Films		
Characters	My Super Psycho Sweet 16	My Super Psycho Sweet 16: Part 2	My Super Psycho Sweet 16: Part 3
Characters	2009	2010	2012
Skye Rotter	Lauren McKnight Lauren Eichner^{Y}	Lauren McKnight	Lauren McKnight
Madison "Maddie" Penrose	Julianna Guill	Julianna Guill^{C}	Julianna Guill^{A}
Brigg Jenner	Chris Zylka	Chris Zylka	Chris Zylka^{U}^{C}
Derek McNamera	Matt Angel	Matt Angel	Matt Angel^{A}
Charlie Rotter	Alex Van	Alex Van	Alex Van^{A}
Olivia Wade	Maia Osman	Maia Osman^{P}	Maia Osman^{A}
Chloe Anderson	Susan Griffiths	Susan Griffiths^{P}	Susan Griffiths^{A}
Kevin Donaldson	Joey Nappo	Joey Nappo^{P}	Joey Nappo^{A}
Lily McFadden	Leandra Terrazzano	Leandra Terrazzano^{P}	
Mr. Penrose	Ric Reitz		
Mrs. Penrose	Kathleen Batson		
Party Planner	Chad McKnight		Chad McKnight^{A}
Carolyn Bell	Mentioned	Myndy Crist	Myndy Crist^{A}
Alex Bell		Kirsten Prout	Kirsten Prout
Zoe Chandler		Stella Maeve	Stella Maeve^{A}
Molly Abiko		Jennifer Sun Bell	
Courtney Ramirez		Gina Rodriguez	
James Feldman		Devin Keaton	Devin Keaton^{A}
Ted Bell		Robert Pralgo	Robert Pralgo^{A}
Nathan Stillo			Ryan Sypek
Sienna Brooks			Jillian Rose Reed
Nico Velli			Niko Pepaj
Leo Fincher			Ben Winchell
Ami Cyrus			Onira Tares
Brynn Stone			Autumn Dial
Mr. Jenner			Roy McCrerey

=== Additional production and crew details ===
Film	Crew/detail					
Film	Composer	Cinematographer	Editor	Production companies	Distribution companies	Running time
My Super Psycho Sweet 16	Ben Lovett	Thomas C. Bingham	Matt Blundell	In Cahoots Media, Inc. The Popfilms Movie Company MTV Production Development	MTV	84 minutes
My Super Psycho Sweet 16: Part 2	Ben Lovett	Eric Maddison	Matt Blundell	In Cahoots Media, Inc. The Popfilms Movie Company MTV Production Development	MTV	85 minutes
My Super Psycho Sweet 16: Part 3	Ben Lovett	Eric Maddison	Matt Blundell	In Cahoots Media, Inc. The Popfilms Movie Company MTV Production Development	MTV	83 minutes

== See also ==
- My Super Sweet 16
