= Joshua Butler =

American film director

- Occupations: Film director, television director, screenwriter, producer, executive producer
- Years active: 1993–present

Joshua Butler is an American film and television director, producer and screenwriter best known for directing the 2001 film Prancer Returns and multiple episodes of many hit series including The Vampire Diaries. He is the founder of Iceblink Films, a movie production company based in the greater Los Angeles area.

== Biography ==
Joshua Butler graduated from USC's Film School having written and directed the award-winning short Will Work for Food (1995). By 2003 he had directed three series for the USA Network and Syfy, along with four feature-length films: Beer Money (2001) written by Rich Wilkes; Prancer Returns (2001) produced by Raffaella De Laurentiis (won 12 awards including Best Family Movie at the Young Artist Awards) and was featured on The CW Network in December 2012; Saint Sinner (2002) written and produced by Clive Barker (nominated for an International Horror Guild Award); and Deathlands (2003) which was directed and executively produced by Joshua Butler in association with his former production company Kinetic Pictures.

Butler was also an executive producer on ESPN's first original film A Season on the Brink (2002) and the MTV hit My Super Psycho Sweet 16 (2009), including two sequels. In 2008, Joshua wrote and directed Vlog (2008), a feature film for Twisted Pictures, the producers of the Saw movie series. After its premiere at the Hollywood Film Festival, Vlog (2008) went on to play at 21 film festivals and was released by Anchor Bay Entertainment on Halloween of 2011. Since 2011, Butler has directed multiple episodes of the hit series on The CW Network The Vampire Diaries (2009), The Secret Circle (2011), Ringer (2011), and Nikita (2010). He also directed Twisted, Ravenswood and Pretty Little Liars for the ABC Family. He directed five episodes of Kevin Williamson's FOX series The Following (2013), starring Kevin Bacon; The Originals (2013) for The CW Network; Reckless (2014) for CBS and Crisis (2014) for NBC.

His recent work includes directing a music video for Ryan Star titled "Bullet" and the series Matador (2014) for Robert Rodriguez and the El Rey network. In 2015, Butler directed his 11th episode of The Vampire Diaries, Joe Carnahan's NBC thriller State of Affairs, starring Katherine Heigl and is writing and directing a feature film.

== Awards ==
For Prancer Returns, Butler received a DVD Exclusive Awards nomination for Best Director.

== Filmography ==
=== Director ===
- Will Work For Food (1995, Short Feature)
- Good vs Evil (2000, 2 episodes)
- The Invisible Man (2000, 4 episodes)
- The Huntress (2001, 1 episode)
- Beer Money (2001, TV Feature)
- Prancer Returns (2001, Feature)
- Saint Sinner (2002, TV Feature)
- Deathlands: Homeward Bound (2003, TV Feature)
- Vlog (TV series) (2008, 18 episodes)
- Vlog (2008, Feature)
- The Vampire Diaries (2010–present, 9 episodes)
- The Secret Circle (2012, 2 episodes)
- Ringer (2012, 1 episode)
- Nikita (2012, 1 episode)
- Twisted (2013, 1 episode)
- The Originals (2013, 1 episode)
- The Following (2013 - 2014, 5 episodes)
- Ravenswood (2014, 1 episode)
- Pretty Little Liars (2014, 1 episode)
- Crisis (2014, 1 episode)
- Reckless (2014, 1 episode)
- Bullet (2014, Music Video)
- State of Affairs (2014, 1 episode)
- Matador (2014, 1 episode)
- The Magicians (2016-2017, 3 episodes)
- Shadowhunters (2017, 1 episode)

=== Producer ===
- A Season on the Brink (2002, TV Feature)
- Deathlands: Homeward Bound (2003, TV Feature)
- My Super Psycho Sweet 16 (2009, TV Feature)
- My Super Psycho Sweet 16: Part 2 (2010, TV Feature)
- My Super Psycho Sweet 16: Part 3 (2012, TV Feature)

=== Screenwriter ===
- Will Work for Food (1995, Short Feature)
- Vlog (TV series) (2008, 18 episodes)
- Vlog (2008, Feature)
