= List of 2012 box office number-one films in Ecuador =

This is a list of films which have placed number one at the weekend box office in Ecuador during 2012.

== Number-one films ==
†	This implies the highest-grossing movie of the year.

#	Date	Film	Gross	Notes
1	January 8, 2012	Sherlock Holmes: A Game of Shadows	$734,121	
2	January 15, 2012	The Adventures of Tintin: The Secret of the Unicorn	$587,425	
3	January 22, 2012	The Muppets	$754,445	
4	January 29, 2012	The Muppets	$480,867	
5	February 5, 2012	The Muppets	$414,293	
6	February 12, 2012	Star Wars: Episode I – The Phantom Menace (reissue)	$483,252	
7	February 19, 2012	Journey 2: The Mysterious Island	$680,042	
8	February 26, 2012	Journey 2: The Mysterious Island	$612,648	
9	March 4, 2012	Journey 2: The Mysterious Island	$704,570	
10	March 11, 2012	John Carter	$690,604	
11	March 18, 2012	John Carter	$590,056	
12	March 25, 2012	Beauty and the Beast	$691,550	
13	April 1, 2012	Beauty and the Beast	$591,776	
14	April 8, 2012	The Lorax	$733,874	
15	April 15, 2012	The Lorax	$372,959	
16	April 22, 2012	Wrath of the Titans	$702,420	
17	April 29, 2012	Marvel's The Avengers	$1,481,899	
18	May 6, 2012	Marvel's The Avengers	$1,089,452	
19	May 13, 2012	Marvel's The Avengers	$676,188	
20	May 20, 2012	Marvel's The Avengers	$612,206	
21	May 27, 2012	Men in Black 3	$817,882	
22	June 3, 2012	Madagascar 3: Europe's Most Wanted	$854,973	
23	June 10, 2012	Madagascar 3: Europe's Most Wanted	$854,511	
24	June 17, 2012	Madagascar 3: Europe's Most Wanted	$831,355	
25	June 24, 2012	Madagascar 3: Europe's Most Wanted	$747,630	
26	July 1, 2012	Ice Age: Continental Drift	$1,212,422	
27	July 8, 2012	The Amazing Spider-Man	$1,226,712	
28	July 15, 2012	Ice Age: Continental Drift	$982,999	
29	July 22, 2012	Ice Age: Continental Drift	$737,202	
30	July 29, 2012	The Dark Knight Rises	$923,464	
31	August 5, 2012	The Dark Knight Rises	$703,369	
32	August 12, 2012	Brave	$1,039,703	
33	August 19, 2012	Brave	$634,283	
34	August 26, 2012	Brave	$514,020	
35	September 2, 2012	Secret of the Wings	$562,726	
36	September 9, 2012	The Apparition	$158,548	
37	September 16, 2012	Resident Evil: Retribution	$655,676	
38	September 23, 2012	Resident Evil: Retribution	$594,522	
39	September 30, 2012	Resident Evil: Retribution	$479,571	
40	October 7, 2012	Taken 2	$469,391	
41	October 14, 2012	Frankenweenie	$663,901	
42	October 21, 2012	Hotel Transylvania	$604,777	
43	October 28, 2012	Hotel Transylvania	$575,235	
44	November 4, 2012	Skyfall	$800,935	
45	November 11, 2012	Skyfall	$487,854	
46	November 18, 2012	The Twilight Saga: Breaking Dawn – Part 2 †	$1,003,809	
47	November 25, 2012	The Twilight Saga: Breaking Dawn – Part 2 †	$624,011	
48	December 2, 2012	Rise of the Guardians	$537,875	
49	December 9, 2012	Rise of the Guardians	$481,455	
50	December 16, 2012	Rise of the Guardians	$213,412	
51	December 23, 2012	Life of Pi	$420,130	
52	December 30, 2012	The Hobbit: An Unexpected Journey	$622,193	
