= Dan Bush =

American film director and screenwriter

- Born: 1971 or 1972 (age 53–54)
- Occupation(s): Film director and screenwriter
- Known for: The Signal

Dan Bush is an American film director and screenwriter best known for The Signal (2007), which he co-directed and co-wrote with Jacob Gentry and David Bruckner.

== Early life ==
Bush attended the University of South Carolina and University of North Carolina at Chapel Hill.

== Career ==
With Jacob Gentry and David Bruckner, he co-wrote and co-directed The Signal, which premiered at the 2007 Sundance Film Festival. The three had worked together previously in various projects in Atlanta. Bush collaborated with Ben Lovett, who scored The Signal, in the short film Ghost of Old Highways, which won Best Music and Best Cinematography at the Charlotte Film Festival. Bilge Ebiri of New York wrote that his short film A Day in the Life (2006) is "one of the coolest short films we’ve seen in recent years". The Reconstruction of William Zero premiered at the Fantasia Festival on July 20, 2014. In January 2014, Screen Daily reported that The Trust was to begin pre-production in April 2014.

== Awards and nominations ==
In 2008, Bush was nominated for the Independent Spirit John Cassavetes Award along with Bruckner and Gentry for The Signal.

== Filmography ==
Film	Year	Director	Producer	Writer	Editor	Notes
Gil's Choice	1998	Yes	No	Yes	No	
A Day in the Life	2006	Yes	No	Yes	Yes	short film
The Signal	2007	Yes	No	Yes	Yes	segment "Escape from Terminus"
FightFuckPray	2008	Yes	No	Yes	No	
The Blood Bond	2010	No	No	Yes	No	
Ghost of Old Highways	2012	Yes	No	Yes	Yes	short film
The Reconstruction of William Zero	2014	Yes	Yes	Yes	No	
Don Peyote	2014	No	executive	No	Yes	
The Vault	2017	Yes	No	Yes	Yes	
