= Private Valentine: Blonde & Dangerous =

2008 comedy film

- DVD cover
- Directed by: Steve Miner
- Written by: April Blair; Kelly Bowe
- Produced by: Bill Gerber; Boaz Davidson; Randall Emmett
- Starring: Jessica Simpson; Vivica A. Fox; Ryan Sypek; Olesya Rulin; Cheri Oteri; Jill Marie Jones; Keiko Agena; Aimee Garcia
- Cinematography: Patrick Cady
- Edited by: Nathan Easterling
- Music by: Dennis Smith
- Production companies: Emmett/Furla Films; Gerber Pictures; Papa Joe Films
- Distributed by: Sony Pictures/Screen Gems
- Release dates: October 9, 2008 (Russia); February 3, 2009 (United States)
- Running time: 98 minutes
- Country: United States
- Language: English

Private Valentine: Blonde & Dangerous (also known as Major Movie Star in the United Kingdom) is a 2008 American comedy film starring Jessica Simpson. Simpson plays the title role of Megan Valentine, a down-on-her-luck actress who enlists in the United States Army.

== Plot ==
When film star Megan Valentine suddenly finds herself broke and humiliated in the public eye, she wanders from the wreckage of a car accident and witlessly enlists in the United States Army, hoping that it will change her life. The spoiled actress immediately finds herself at odds with her tough drill sergeants and the harsh discipline of army life, leading to many humorous situations.

In the end, Valentine changes and becomes a better person and wins the respect of her fellow trainees, and they all graduate together. She also recovers her house and the money that she lost.

== Cast ==
- Jessica Simpson as Private Megan Valentine
- Vivica A. Fox as First Sergeant Louisa Morley
- Ryan Sypek as Drill Sergeant Mills Evans
- Olesya Rulin as Private Elisa Petrovich
- Jill Marie Jones as Private Connie Johnson
- Keiko Agena as Private Hailey Hamamori
- Aimee Garcia as Private Vicky Castillo
- Cheri Oteri as Private Sarah Jeter
- Gary Grubbs as Captain Peter Greer
- Andy Milonakis as Joe Kidd
- Steve Guttenberg as Sidney Green
- Michael Hitchcock as Nigel Crew
- Bryce Johnson as Derek O'Grady
- Katie Chonacas as Amber
- Travis Schuldt as Sergeant First Class Harrison
- Kurt Fuller as Cousin Barry
- Lara Grice as Jinny Valentine

== Production ==
In June 2007, the film was announced under the title of Major Movie Star with Jessica Simpson set to star. The film had previously begun development at Warner Bros. in 2002 when the company acquired the spec script by April Blair. Private Valentine: Blonde & Dangerous is set at Fort Jackson, which is a real U.S. Army training base. It was filmed at Camp Minden, a Louisiana National Guard Camp located in Minden, Louisiana, United States.

== Releases ==
The film was released in the United States straight to DVD as Private Valentine: Blonde & Dangerous on February 3, 2009. The film was released in the United Kingdom as Major Movie Star on May 18, 2009.

== In popular culture ==
On the October 29, 2008, episode of Late Night with Conan O'Brien, host O'Brien brought up the movie and mentioned reports that Simpson's acting was "so bad" that it would not be released "in any country where English is the primary language". The show then displayed the poster because it was refused a clip. The next night, the show played a clip from a bootleg copy before having recurring guest star James Lipton make a passionate plea to Simpson to reconsider her decision to withhold the film, saying the "bad defines the good" and the apparent "85 minute stinkbomb" of Major Movie Star only would help to highlight how good Schindler's List really was.
