= The Reconstruction of William Zero =

- Film poster
- Directed by: Dan Bush
- Written by: Dan Bush; Conal Byrne
- Produced by: Linda Burns; Dan Bush; Conal Byrne; Clay Floren; Alexander A. Motlagh; Aimee Shieh
- Starring: Conal Byrne; Amy Seimetz; Tim Habeger; Adam Fristoe; Scott Poythress; Lake Roberts; Melissa McBride; Jeff Rose
- Cinematography: Jon Swindall
- Edited by: Dan Bush
- Music by: Ben Lovett
- Production companies: Floren Shieh Productions; Pop Films
- Release date: July 20, 2014 (Fantasia Festival)
- Running time: 98 minutes
- Country: United States
- Language: English

The Reconstruction of William Zero is a 2014 American science fiction film directed by Dan Bush, written by Bush and Conal Byrne, and starring Byrne and Amy Seimetz. Byrne plays a geneticist who clones himself.

== Plot ==
After accidentally causing the death of his son, geneticist William Blakely wakes in a house tended by a man who introduces himself as his twin brother. His brother explains that William was involved in a car crash. William can remember nothing of his life and must be taught basic concepts, such as how to walk and respond to knock-knock jokes. Together, they watch old footage of William and his twin as children. Though William does not recognize his estranged wife Jules, he is entranced by her. William's brother is finally called to return to work at Next Corp, and he leaves William alone in the house for the day.

At work, William's brother is revealed to be the real William Blakely – William 1. He stole material from the lab to create a clone, William 2. His assistant, Baxter, tells William 1 that their test subjects have been dying after mere weeks. Before William 1 can do anything further, his boss, Dr. Archer, takes him to see several security agents, who accuse him of stealing the lab materials. Dr. Archer supports him, but the security agents remain suspicious. At the same time, William 2 explores the house and discovers enough evidence that he becomes confused about his origins and identity. Further confusing William 2 is a phone call apparently from a haggard-sounding version of William (who is later revealed to be the original William, William Zero) who apologizes for leaving him and promises to return.

William 2 angrily confronts William 1. After interrogating William 1, William 2 ties him up and leaves to find Jules, who he hopes can explain further. Although overwhelmed by his first experiences in the world, William 2 quickly adapts and locates Jules. He awkwardly reestablishes contact with her, though she initially rejects him, as she feels abandoned and left alone to deal with her grief. William 2 secretly follows her around the city and becomes more smitten with her. Meanwhile, William 1 escapes his bonds and kills a Next Corp security agent who was investigating the house and its grounds. William 1 recovers a pistol from the agent's body and uses it to kill Dr. Archer.

William 1 quickly returns home and pretends to be bound. When his clone arrives, he convinces William 2 to take over his life, as William 1 does not wish to return to it. William 2 reluctantly agrees, and goes to work at Next Corp, where he learns that the animal test subjects are second generation clones. Baxter explains that cloning a clone causes extensive genetic problems, and William 2, who is experiencing the described symptoms, realizes that he must be a second generation clone, too. Before he can return home to further question William 1, a security team detains him for further questioning. Baxter, dubious about the company's ethics, frees him and traps the security team.

After growing increasingly suspicious of his neighbor's activities, Lester confronts William 1. William 1 invites Lester inside, and, after pushing him down a flight of stairs, explains his origins. The original William Blakely, William Zero, was so overcome by guilt and grief that he abandoned his wife and created a clone, William 1, to replace him. However, William 1 felt abandoned by his creator once William Zero disappeared. As he struggled through life with no help, he became bitter and disillusioned, eventually attempting suicide. Unable to face his own broken life, William 1 created a clone to replace him – freeing him to seek vengeance on William Zero and the world.

After killing Lester, William 1 lures Jules to the house, planning to kill her to spite William Zero. Although confused by his cold demeanor compared to William 2, Jules does not suspect anything. William 2 arrives before William 1 can kill Jules, and he tells Jules that he loves her. After the two embrace, William 2 attempts to dispose of William 1's body, only to be confronted by William Zero. Knowing he will soon die, William 2 convinces William Zero to return to his wife and promise never to leave her again. William Zero tearfully agrees, and they arrange for his death to be faked. Some time later, William Zero is shown together with Jules and his now-cloned son.

== Cast ==
- Conal Byrne as William 1, William 2, and William Zero
- Amy Seimetz as Jules
- Tim Habeger as Dr. Archer
- Adam Fristoe as Mr. Langley
- Scott Poythress as Lester
- Lake Roberts as Baxter
- Melissa McBride as Dr. Ashley Bronson
- Jeff Rose as Mr. Penn
- A. J. Bowen as Mr. Bragg

== Release ==
The Reconstruction of William Zero premiered at the Fantasia Festival on July 20, 2014. It was released to video on demand in April 2015.

== Reception ==
On review aggregator Rotten Tomatoes, the film holds an approval rating of 29% based on 7 reviews, with an average rating of 4.85/10. On Metacritic, the film has a weighted average score of 57 out of 100, based on 5 critics, indicating "mixed or generally average reviews". Peter Debruge of Variety compared it to the work of H.G. Wells, who he said "would surely approve of this suburban mad-scientist tale". John DeFore of The Hollywood Reporter described it as a "thoughtful, intimate film [that] works both as sci-fi and family drama". Robert Abele of the Los Angeles Times wrote, "The Reconstruction of William Zero has its own identity problem, essentially, being a solid sci-fi story with a welcome emotional component, yet never fully effective at either." Kurt Halfyard of Twitch Film compared it to Another Earth and called it "more vexing than cathartic". Matt Boiselle of Dread Central rated it 2/5 stars and called it "sad and complex" but "hard to swallow and possibly even harder to digest." Noel Murray of The Dissolve rated it 2.5/5 stars and called it "intermittently effective". Keith Uhlich of The A.V. Club rated it C− and wrote, "It's always easy to see what Bush and Byrne are aiming for with this timely piece of speculative fiction. But their execution is, with rare exception, weakly imitative at best and exasperatingly inept at worst."
