= Josh Stamberg =

American actor

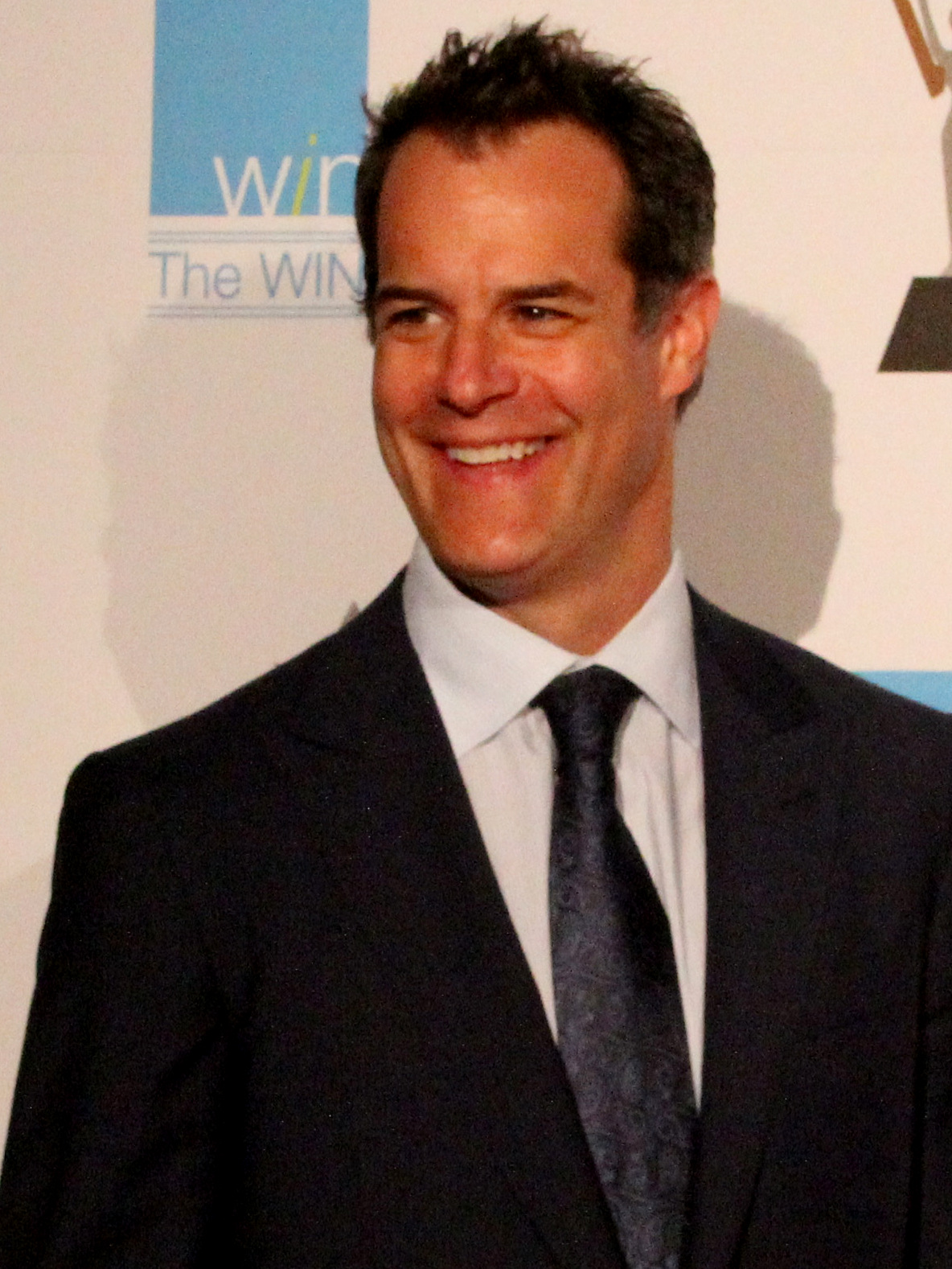
- Stamberg at the Women's Image Network Awards in February 2012
- Born: January 4, 1970 (age 56); Washington, D.C., U.S.
- Occupation: Actor
- Years active: 1994–present
- Spouse: Myndy Crist (divorced)
- Children: 2
- Mother: Susan Stamberg

Joshua Collins Stamberg (born January 4, 1970) is an American actor. He was regular cast member in the Lifetime comedy-drama series Drop Dead Diva from 2009 to 2012, and later had recurring roles on Parenthood, The Affair, and WandaVision.

== Life and career ==
Stamberg was born in Washington, D.C., the son of journalist Susan Stamberg and Louis C. Stamberg. He attended the University of Wisconsin–Madison. He comes from a Jewish family.

Stamberg appeared in numerous television shows, including Nashville, Law & Order, CSI: Miami, Grey's Anatomy, and Parenthood. He also appeared in the Lie to Me pilot. Stamberg appears as S.W.O.R.D. Director Tyler Hayward in the WandaVision Marvel series on Disney+. His film appearances include Fracture, Must Love Dogs, and Kate & Leopold.

In 2020, Stamberg appeared as a guest on the Studio 60 on the Sunset Strip, and in the marathon fundraiser episode of The George Lucas Talk Show.

He was married to actress Myndy Crist. They have two daughters, Vivian and Lena.

== Filmography ==
=== Film ===
Year	Title	Role	Notes
1994	Normandy: The Great Crusade	Francis Greenleaf (voice)	Television film
1997	Pest	uncredited-street dancer	
2000	The Photographer	Peter Morgan	
2001	Kate & Leopold	Colleague Bob	
2002	Crazy Little Thing	Eddie Oshinski	
2002	The Time Machine	Motorist	
2002	Washington Heights	Dr. Field	
2002	Standard Time	Steve	
2005	A Lot like Love	Michael	
2005	Must Love Dogs	Lennie	
2005	Love for Rent	Paul	
2006	Play It by Ear	Robert	
2006	Drifting Elegant	Nate	
2007	Fracture	Norman Foster	
2010	Legion	Burton	
2011	J. Edgar	Agent Stokes	
2011	The Carrier	Kelly	
2013	Afternoon Delight	Matt	
2013	Saving Lincoln	Salmon P. Chase	
2013	Dark Skies	Police officer	
2014	Havenhurst	Tim	
2015	Day Out of Days	Josh	
2016	Havenhurst	Tim	
2017	Home Again	Warren	
2017	The Etruscan Smile	Jeff	
2021	Operation Varsity Blues: The College Admissions Scandal	Bill McGlashan	

=== Television ===
Year	Title	Role	Notes
1998	Spin City	Phil Hockner	Episode: "Gentleman's Agreement"
1998	Sex and the City	Brian	Episode: "Valley of the Twenty-Something Guys"
2000	The Street	Grant Johnson	Episode: "Rebound"
2002	CSI: Miami	Ben McCadden	2 episodes
2002	Law & Order	Martin Stanley	Episode: "Asterisk"
2003	NYPD Blue	Chris Dunwoody	Episode: "Marine Life"
2003–04	Six Feet Under	Sarge	2 episodes
2003–05	Monk	Agent Grooms	2 episodes
2004	CSI: Crime Scene Investigation	Dr. Tripton	Episode: "Butterflied"
2005	Grey's Anatomy	Tommy Walker	Episode: "Save Me"
2005	Over There	Lt. Alexander "Underpants" Hunter	5 episodes
2006	Love Monkey	Eli	Episode: "Pilot"
2006	Courting Alex	Stephen	8 episodes
2006	It's Always Sunny in Philadelphia	Ari Frenkel	Episode: "The Gang Goes Jihad"
2006–07	Studio 60 on the Sunset Strip	Luke Scott	6 episodes
2007	House	Don Herrick	Episode: "Insensitive"
2007	Brothers & Sisters	Cliff	Episode: "States of the Union"
2008	Men in Trees	Jim Switzer	2 episodes
2008	NCIS	Marine Major Ike Varnai	Episode: "In the Zone"
2009	Lie to Me	AUSA Hutchinson	Episode: "Pilot"
2009	The Ex List	Wade Redden	Episode: "The Babysitter"
2009–2012	Drop Dead Diva	Jay Parker	52 episodes
2010	Law & Order: Criminal Intent	Dr. Chris Denardi	Episode: "Love on Ice"
2010–11	The Whole Truth	Carl Bagley	3 episodes
2012	Castle	Martin Danberg	2 episodes
2012	Criminal Minds	Mike Acklin	Episode: "Through the Looking Glass"
2013	Justified	FBI Agent Alex Barnes	Episode: "Truth and Consequences"
2013	Arrested Development	Sergeant Briggs	Episode: "Off the Hook"
2013	Suits	Richard Jensen	Episode: "The Arrangement"
2013–14	Parenthood	Carl Fletcher	9 episodes
2014	Perception	Sean	Episode: "Obsession"
2014	Unforgettable	Robert Bright	Episode: "Throwing Shade"
2014–2017	The Affair	Max	16 episodes
2015	The Good Wife	Dr. Joseph Portnow	Episode: "RSK"
2017	Doubt	Max Brennan	Episode: "The Return"
2017	Law & Order: True Crimes	Robert Rand	3 episodes
2017	Longmire	U.S. Marshal Hammond	3 episodes
2018	Nashville	Darius	7 episodes
2018	Macgyver	Paul "Deacon" Hern	Episode: "Bravo Lead + Loyalty + Friendship"
2019	The Loudest Voice	Bill Shine	7 episodes; Limited series
2020	The George Lucas Talk Show	Himself	1 episode; Talk-show
2021	Law & Order: Special Victims Unit	Judge Charles Gallagher	Episode: "The Long Arm of the Witness"
2021	WandaVision	Director Tyler Hayward	6 episodes
2022	The Rookie	Dexter Hayes	Episode: "Hit List"
2022	Minx	George	Episode: “Oh, so you're the sun now? You're the giver of life?”
2022	Magnum P.I.	Shane Whelan	2 episodes
2022	The Time Traveler's Wife	Richard DeTamble	2 episodes
2022	Fleishman Is in Trouble	Sam Rothberg	6 episodes
2024	Ted	Professor Lucas Damon	Episode: "Subways, Bicycles and Automobiles"
2024	The Equalizer	Captain Miller	Episode: "Shattered"
2024	Based on a True Story	Danny Merrick	Episode: "Double Fault"
2026	9-1-1	Detective Ben Hooks	4 episodes
TBA	The Murder of JonBenét Ramsey	Reed Hunt	Upcoming series
