= Lauren McKnight =

American actress (born 1988)

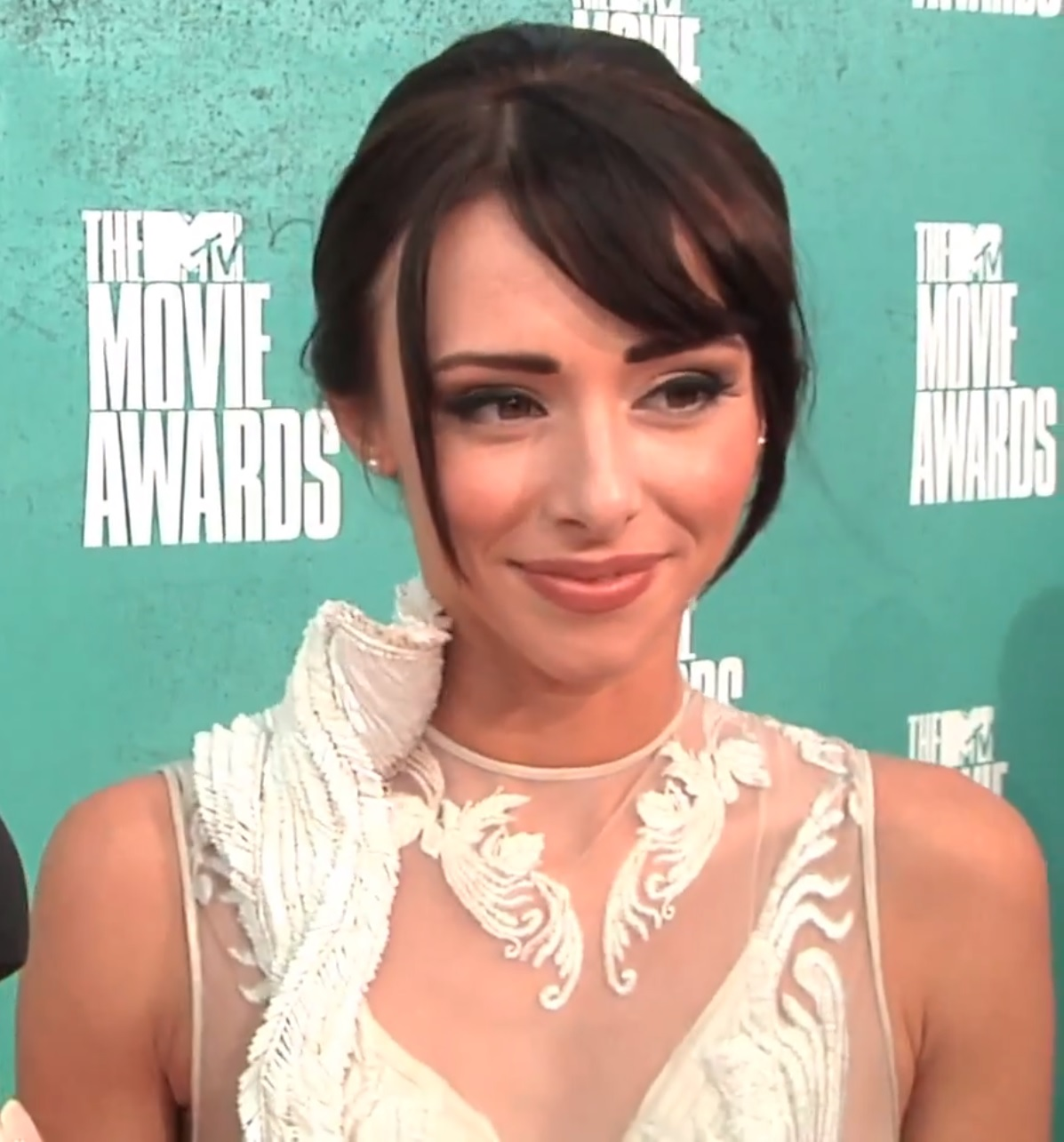
- McKnight at the 2012 MTV Movie Awards
- Born: October 3, 1988 (age 36); Los Angeles, California, United States
- Occupation: Actress
- Years active: 2005–present

Lauren McKnight (born October 3, 1988) is an American actress. She is best known for her role as Skye Rotter in the My Super Psycho Sweet 16 trilogy (2009–2012).

== Career ==
McKnight began her career when she was seventeen at 2005 at Disney Channel's TV Movie Go Figure. She then landed a supporting role at feature film Unaccompanied Minors in 2006. In 2007, she starred in the film Whisper Island, in which she played the role of Sam Dalton.

She is also known for her roles in the 2008 television series Lifeless and teen romantic comedy HottieBoombaLottie which was picked up by MTV.

In 2009 she played the lead role, serial killer's daughter Skye Rotter, for MTV's My Super Psycho Sweet 16. In 2010 she reprised her character for My Super Psycho Sweet 16: Part 2, then again in 2012 for the conclusion to the series, My Super Psycho Sweet 16: Part 3. In 2013, McKnight played Elizabeth the "Lizard" in Once Upon a Time in Wonderland.

== Personal life ==
McKnight has three younger brothers.

In an interview, McKnight said that when she is not working, she is usually out with friends. She loves going to movies, or out to local concerts.

In January 2016 McKnight was the lead subject of a New York Times article about Los Angeles based actors and artists taking jobs driving for Uber and Lyft at between acting and artistic jobs.

== Filmography ==
=== Film ===
Year	Title	Role	Notes
2006	Unaccompanied Minors	Jetsetter	
2007	Whisper Island	Sam Dalton	
2007	House of Fears	Megan	
2008	HottieBoombaLottie	Cleo	
2008	Caleb Couldn't Love	Riley	Short film
2008	Forever Strong	Gina	
2009	Heels Over Head	Jade	Short film
2011	Bad Wolf	Red	Short film
2012	So Undercover	Alex Patrone	
2015	Welcome to the Party	Eliza	Short film
2018	The Outer Wild	Laura	
2018	Nowhere Providence	Molly Mannequin	
2019	City of Morgana	Princess Cyberspace	Short film
2020	Heel	Missy	Short film

=== Television ===
Year	Title	Role	Notes
2005	Go Figure	Skater #2	Television film
2008	Lifeless	Emily	Television film
2009	My Super Psycho Sweet 16	Skye Rotter	Television film
2010	My Super Psycho Sweet 16: Part 2	Skye Rotter	Television film
2012	My Super Psycho Sweet 16: Part 3	Skye Rotter	Television film
2013	Wendell & Vinnie	Crystal	Episode: "Valentines & the Cultural Experience"
2013	Family Tools	Louise	Episode: "Now You See Me, Now You Don't"
2013	Teen Wolf	Emily	Episode: "Firefiles"
2013–2014	Once Upon a Time in Wonderland	Elizabeth "Lizard"	3 episodes
2014	Mistresses	Brynn	2 episodes
2014	Gortimer Gibbon's Life on Normal Street	Lily Van Goethen	Episode: "Gortimer Gets Shushed"
2015	Down Dog	Ruthie	Television film
2015	Wicked City	Famous Star	Episode: "The Very Thought of You"
2019	How to Get Away with Murder	Heather	Episode: "Say Goodbye"
2020	NCIS: Los Angeles	Coco	Episode: "High Society"
2021	It's Always Sunny in Philadelphia	Anna	Episode: "The Gang Makes Lethal Weapon 7"
2023	Mayans M.C.	Chip	6 episodes
