= The Lady from Sockholm =

- Directed by: Eddy Von Mueller; Evan Lieberman
- Written by: Lynn Lamousin
- Produced by: Lynn Lamousin
- Starring: Vince Tortorici; Chris Clabo; R. T. Steckel; Eric Goins; Melanie Parker; Melanie Walker
- Cinematography: Evan Lieberman; Jon Swindall
- Edited by: Jon Swindall; Jacob Gentry
- Music by: Hutch DeLoach
- Production company: Kittyboy Creations
- Release date: June 12, 2005
- Running time: 67 minutes
- Country: United States
- Language: English

The Lady from Sockholm is a 2005 American comedy film directed by Eddy Von Mueller and Evan Lieberman. Lynn Lamousin wrote and produced. It is a parody of 1940s film noir that uses sock puppets for all characters. It stars the voices of Vince Tortorici, Chris Clabo, R. T. Steckel, Eric Goins, Melanie Parker, and Melanie Walker.

== Plot ==
During Wool War II, New Jersey private investigator Terrence M. Cotton is hired to find a missing husband. When Cotton finds the man dead, he is drawn further into a conspiracy that takes him to Chinatown and its criminal elements.

== Cast ==
- Vince Tortorici as Terrence M. Cotton
- Chris Clabo as Archie Goodfoot, Callous McGhee, The Haberdashery Clerk, Blue-ring Tube Sock
- R. T. Steckel as Big Toeny, Sgt. O'lastic, Patches the Barber, Red-ring Tube Sock, House of Bootah Waiter
- Eric Goins as Phoot Fung Us, Spats Sinclair, Old Wool Sock
- Melanie Parker as Heelda Brum, Tootsie
- Melanie Walker Kicky LaFetiche, Baby Bootsey, Madame

Vince Tortorici, Evy Wright, Annie Peterle, and Reay Kaplan performed as puppeteers.

== Production ==
Writer Lynn Lamousin was inspired to write a story about distrust of foreigners after the September 11 attacks. The idea for sock puppets grew out of her desire to find a creative way to tell the story; the initial idea was always to use inanimate objects. The co-directors are faculty at Emory University. They become involved after they saw and liked the script. The film was originally intended to be converted to black and white, but during post-production, it was decided to keep it in color. Shooting took 12 days and used local Atlanta talent for the puppets.

== Release ==
The Lady from Sockholm premiered at Atlanta Film Festival on June 12, 2005.

== Reception ==
Dennis Harvey of Variety described it as "a brief yet tiresome low-budgeter which spoofs film noirs in a manner likely to bore adult and child viewers alike". Melissa Starker of Columbus Alive praised the film's visual style and puns. Stina Chyn of Film Threat rated it 3.5/5 stars and wrote, "More adorable than Lambchop and friends and a delight to watch, the puppets in The Lady of Sockholm will leave you itching for a sequel."
