= Ben Lovett =

American songwriter (born 1978)

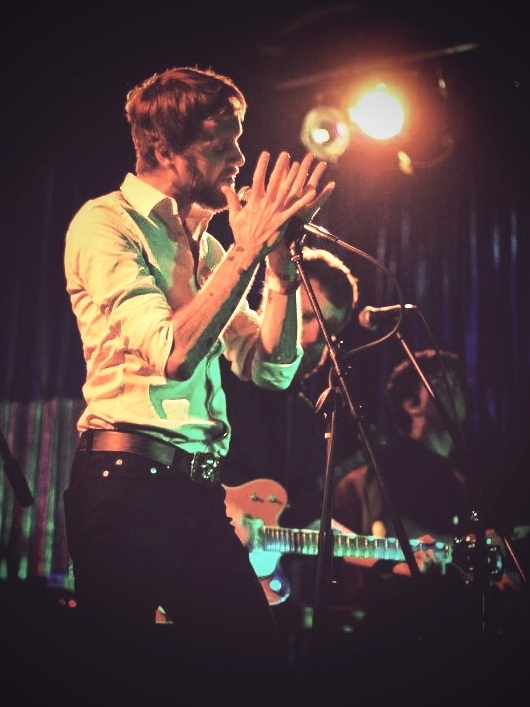

Background information
- Born: May 3, 1978 (age 48); Georgia, United States
- Genres: Film, Experimental, Indie, Alternative
- Occupations: Composer, Songwriter, Recording Artist, Producer
- Instruments: Vocals, Guitar, Piano
- Years active: 2000–present
- Label: Lovers Label
- Website: benlovett.com

Ben Lovett (born May 3, 1978) is an American film composer, songwriter and producer. His non-film compositions are released under the names Lovett and Lovers & Friends. Lovett is the founder of the record label, Lovers Label.

As a composer, Lovett has scored a diverse range of films and documentaries including Hellraiser, The Ritual and The Night House from director and frequent collaborator David Bruckner, as well as the Jim Cummings' comedy The Wolf of Snow Hollow and Jacob Gentry's Synchronicity, which earned Lovett a nomination for "Discovery Of The Year" at the World Soundtrack Awards in 2016.

Past musical projects include producing the album Chris Wollard & The Ship Thieves featuring Chris Wollard (of Hot Water Music), and Heavens featuring Matt Skiba (of Alkaline Trio).

Lovett's catalog of film credits include scores for Amy Seimetz's award-winning debut Sun Don't Shine, Katie Aselton's thriller Black Rock (2012 film) and Emma Tammi's The Wind. His works for television include original music for the ESPN documentary series 30 For 30; the Hulu series Into The Dark, and Cartoon Network's Adult Swim.

== Discography ==
LPs:

Year	Title	Label
2008	The Signal (Original Motion Picture Soundtrack)	Lakeshore Records
2009	The Last Lullaby (Original Motion Picture Soundtrack)	Lovers Label
2011	Highway Collection	Lovers Label
2012	Black Rock (Original Motion Picture Soundtrack)	Lovers Label
2012	Sun Don't Shine (Music From The Motion Picture)	Lovers Label
2015	The Reconstruction Of William Zero (Music From The Motion Picture)	Lovers Label
2016	Synchronicity (Original Motion Picture Soundtrack)	Lakeshore Records
2018	American Folk (Original Motion Picture Soundtrack)	Lakeshore Records
2018	The Ritual (Original Motion Picture Soundtrack)	Lakeshore Records
2019	The Wind (Original Motion Picture Soundtrack)	Lakeshore Records
2019	I Trapped the Devil (Original Motion Picture Soundtrack)	Lakeshore Records
2020	Stuffed (Original Motion Picture Soundtrack)	Lakeshore Records
2020	The Wolf Of Snow Hollow (Original Motion Picture Soundtrack)	Lakeshore Records
2021	The Old Ways (Original Motion Picture Soundtrack)	eOne Music
2021	The Night House (Original Motion Picture Soundtrack)	Lakeshore Records
2021	Broadcast Signal Intrusion (Original Motion Picture Soundtrack)	eOne Music
2022	Hellraiser (Original Motion Picture Soundtrack)	Lakeshore Records

EPs:

Year	Title	Info
2005	The Breath of New Color	Limited Edition 12"
2012	Ghost Of Old Highways	Original score
2015	Season One, Vol. 1	Released as Lovers & Friends
2015	Season One, Vol. 2	Released as Lovers & Friends
2015	Season One, Vol. 3	Released as Lovers & Friends
2015	Season One, Vol. 4	Released as Lovers & Friends

Produced Records:

Year	Artist	Album	Info
2000	Pelican City	Rhode Island	with Brian Burton
2005	Lovett	The Breath of New Color	Limited Edition 12" EP
2006	Heavens	Patent Pending	on Epitaph records, with Matt Skiba (Alkaline Trio).
2009	Chris Wollard & The Ship Thieves	ST	on No Idea Records
2009	Laura Minor	Let Evening Come	Song: The Beast featuring Dalek, on Ocean of Sound Records
2010	The Moor	ST	with Josiah Steinbrick
2011	Lovett	Highway Collection	
2014	Ghost Boots	Ghost Boots EP	
2015	Lovers & Friends	Season One	
2016	Brad Carter	Field Hand	
2016	Lovett & Asheville Symphony	Asheville Symphony Sessions	“Don’t Freak Out” with Michael Selverne

Composer:

Year	Film title	Info
2005	Last Goodbye	Starring Faye Dunaway and David Carradine. The film premiered at Tribeca Film Festival.
2007	The Signal	an American Horror film written and directed by independent filmmakers David Bruckner, Dan Bush and Jacob Gentry. Premiered at the 2007 Sundance Film Festival, and was theatrically released by Magnolia Pictures in 2008. The original score was released on Lakeshore Records in 2008.[6]
2008	The Last Lullaby	a 2008 drama/noir film starring Tom Sizemore and Sasha Alexander, and winner of Best Score - 2009 at Brooklyn International Film Festival.[7]
2009	My Super Psycho Sweet 16	An MTV Films original movie.
2010	My Super Psycho Sweet 16: Part 2	An MTV Films original movie.
2012	Black Rock	a 2012 American horror-thriller film directed by Katie Aselton and written by Mark Duplass. The film premiered at the 2012 Sundance Film Festival and was released theatrically on May 17, 2013. Black Rock stars Katie Aselton, Lake Bell, and Kate Bosworth.
2012	My Super Psycho Sweet 16: Part 3	An MTV Films original movie.
2012	Sun Don't Shine	a 2012 independent thriller film directed by Amy Seimetz starring Kate Lyn Sheil and Kentucker Audley. The film was a 2012 Gotham Award nominee and winner of a special jury award at the South by Southwest Film Festival the same year.
2012	Ghost of Old Highways	Winner of Best Soundtrack at the 2012 Madrid International Film Festival
2012	When We Lived in Miami	Short film directed by Amy Seimetz.
2014	Don Peyote	a 2014 American comedy film written and directed by Dan Fogler.
2014	The Reconstruction of William Zero	a 2014 American science fiction film directed by Dan Bush, starring Conal Byrne and Amy Seimetz.
2015	Synchronicity	a 2015 American science fiction film directed by Jacob Gentry, starring A. J. Bowen, Brianne Davis, and Michael Ironside. The film was released theatrically by Magnolia Pictures in 2016. The film’s soundtrack was released in 2016 on Lakeshore Records. The score was nominated for "Discovery Of The Year" at the 2016 World Soundtrack Awards.
2015	Isolation	a 2015 American thriller starring Stephen Lang, Tricia Helfer, and Dominic Purcell directed by Shane Dax Taylor.
2016	American Folk	a 2016 American narrative film starring musicians Joe Purdy and Amber Rubarth
2017	The Ritual	a Netflix Original film directed by David Bruckner and starring Rafe Spall, Arsher Ali, Robert James-Collier, and Sam Troughton
2017	ESPN 30 for 30: Tommy	an ESPN 30 for 30 original series film about the life and death of former American heavyweight boxer Tommy Morrison
2018	The Wind	a 2018 film set in the early days of the American prairie settlement starring Caitlin Gerard and Julia Goldani Telles
2018	The Dark Red	an indie thriller starring April Billingsley written and directed by Dan Bush
2019	Stuffed	a documentary film by Erin Derham about the unique lives of professional taxidermists that debuted at the 2019 SXSW Film Festival
2019	I Trapped the Devil	an American supernatural horror film released by IFC Films starring Scott Poythress, A.J. Bowen and Susan Burke
2020	The Wolf Of Snow Hollow	an American comedy from director Jim Cummings starring Robert Forster and Riki Lindhome. The film was released by Orion Classics
2021	Tomorrow's Monsters	a narrative science fiction audio drama starring John Boyega and Darren Criss created by iHeart Radio
2021	The Night House	an American psychological thriller starring Rebecca Hall, written by Ben Collins and Luke Piotrowski directed by David Bruckner. The film debuted at the 2020 Sundance Film Festival and was released theatrically by Searchlight Pictures.
2021	The Old Ways	supernatural horror film starring Brigitte Kali Canales
2021	Broadcast Signal Intrusion	American mystery thriller starring Harry Shum Jr. directed by Jacob Gentry
2021	The Beta Test	a 2021 comedy from director Jim Cummings distributed by IFC Films
2022	Hellraiser	Reboot of the classic horror franchise, starring Jamie Clayton, written by Ben Collins and Luke Piotrowski from a story by David S. Goyer, directed by David Bruckner and released on Hulu
2023	The Mantawuak Caves	award-winning narrative audio drama starring starring Jonathan Tucker created by Blumhouse Television and iHeart Radio.
2027	Pendulum	a 2027 horror mystery thriller from director Mark Heyman
