= Breaking News (American TV series) =

- Genre: Drama
- Created by: Rhonda Moore, John Watson, Gardner Stern,
- Starring: Tim Matheson; Scott Bairstow; Myndy Crist; Vincent Gale; Rowena King; Jeffrey D. Sams; Lisa Ann Walter; Clancy Brown
- Country of origin: United States
- Original language: English
- No. of seasons: 1
- No. of episodes: 13

Production
- Executive producers: Ken Olin; Mark Stern; Pen Densham; Guy McElwain; Gardner Stern; John Watson
- Running time: 45 minutes
- Production companies: New Line Television; Trilogy Entertainment Group

Original release
- Network: Bravo
- Release: July 17 – October 9, 2002

Breaking News is an American drama television series about the fictional Milwaukee-based 24-hour cable news television network I-24, with the motto 'Around the Clock, Around the World'. The series premiered July 17, 2002, on Bravo.

== Cast ==
=== Main ===
- Tim Matheson as anchorman Bill Dunne
- Scott Bairstow as producer Ethan Barnes
- Myndy Crist as reporter Janet LeClaire
- Vincent Gale as Quentin Druzinski
- Rowena King as reporter Jamie Templeton
- Jeffrey D. Sams as reporter Mel Thomas
- Lisa Ann Walter as senior/executive producer Rachel Glass
- Clancy Brown as news division president Peter Kozyck

=== Recurring ===
- Paul Adelstein as cameraman Julian Kerbis
- James Handy as Jack Barnes, independent stations owner, and Ethan Barnes' father
- Patricia Wettig as feature reporter Alison Dunne, and wife of Bill Dunne

=== Guests ===
- Amanda Douge as Cammy (1 episode)

== Production ==
Breaking News was filmed in 2000 and 2001 at The Bridge Studios and Vancouver Film Studios in Vancouver, British Columbia. The series was originally developed for TNT, however they dropped the show before airing any of the 13 episodes, with the series ultimately airing on Bravo. TNT spent $20 million and nine months putting the series together.

== Episodes ==
No.	Title	Written by	Original release date	Prod. code
1	"Pilot"	Gardner Stern	July 17, 2002	1
Peter Kozyck, the News Director for I-24, a 24-hour news network whose motto is "Around the Clock, Around the World", must decide how far he'll go in pursuing a news exclusive which will put his fledgling network on the map.
2	"Hi, Noonan"	Story by : Greg Walker; Teleplay by : Gardner Stern	July 17, 2002	2
A hostage-crisis in a Kansas City dry cleaners forces Janet Leclaire, queen of the "lighter side of life" segment, to don a bullet proof vest and interview the disgruntled gunman face to face. All to the chagrin of I-24's highly visible, more experienced anchor, Bill Dunne, who clashes with Kozyck over whether Janet is qualified for such a dangerous assignment.
3	"Rachel Glass and the No Good, Very Bad Day"	Anne Kenney	July 24, 2002	6
News Director Rachel Glass must face the fact that the nature of her 24/7 job doesn't lend itself to the feelings of social emptiness she's experiencing. At the same time, reporter Mel Thomas is held in contempt of court for withholding videotape on a story – he's thrown in jail, adding pressure to his already strained family life.
4	"Spin Art"	Ian Biederman	July 31, 2002	3
In the wake of agreeing to take things down a notch in their personal relationship, reporter Jamie Templeton and producer Jukian Kerbis are assigned to cover the murder of a gay man in a small town. Meanwhile, concerned with low ratings, Kozyck approaches Dunne about the possibility of a co-anchor. A defensive Dunne discusses it with wife Alison who convinces him a co-anchor might not be bad thing – considering that she is up for a hosting job for a new show on I-24.
5	"Wall-to-Wall Plane Crash"	John Chambers	August 2, 2002	4
All bets for an ordinary news day are off when a DC-9 carrying 118 people crashes in front of Kerbis and Thomas in rural Washington state. Discovering a survivor among the wreckage, Kerbis suspends his work as news producer to become a rescuer. His decision to do so proves questionable when the survivor serves I-24 with a negligence lawsuit.
6	"Victims"	Doug Jung	August 14, 2002	7
Templeton and rookie-producer Ethan Barnes, team up to investigate a toxin-spewing factory and put themselves in serious danger in order to get "the money shot". Back in the newsroom, Rachel re-evaluates her objectivity when she suspects a rape victim being interviewed by I-24 may not be telling the truth.
7	"Dunne's Choice"	Janet Tamaro	August 27, 2002	5
Dunne, while attending old friend Admiral Riles' exclusive Washington, D.C. party overhears sensitive information relating to a submarine accident and its possible political cover-up. New co-anchor LeClaire, who has heard the same information, must go up against Dunne, both on and off the set, as she follows her instincts and digs deeper into the mystery.
8	"Broadcast from Hell"	Ian Biederman	August 28, 2002	8
When I-24's cameramen make good on a pledge to strike producers and reporters are forced to do double duty. In the field, Kerbis aggressively pursues a scandalous incident in the past of a likely Supreme Court nominee only to have the Judge commit suicide minutes before air.
9	"My Suspect Vinny"	Anne Kenney	September 11, 2002	10
Templeton and Kerbis meet Vinny, a sweet-yet-dumb shopping mall security officer whose take on a disappearing teen might very well implicate him as a possible suspect. In the newsroom, Thomas comes up against an editor who refuses to cut a piece about a Holocaust denier, citing that I-24 is only serving this man's goals by giving him air time – their disagreement ultimately turns into an on-set fistfight.
10	"The Story Vanishes"	Janet Tamaro	September 18, 2002	9
Ethan snares the "get of the year" when a notorious international terrorist agrees to be interviewed by Dunne in Paris. Things quickly go south when the terrorist decides to hold the two newsmen against their will. In the newsroom, Alison's skipping of her bipolar medication brings on a manic condition evident in her over-reaching concern for her career rather than for the safety of her husband abroad.
11	"Bad Water"	John Chambers	September 28, 2002	11
After infiltrating an illegal militia in Montana, Ethan witnesses the bombing of a Federal courthouse first-hand. Now that his cover is blown, Ethan must walk a delicate line between his network obligations, an FBI investigation and the at-large terrorist seeking revenge against him.
12	"I24 Gate"	Ian Biederman & Doug Jung	October 2, 2002	12
Templeton puts herself and I-24 at odds with the insular world of Washington, D.C. politics when she breaks a sexual scandal involving a Congressman and a high-priced call girl. In the newsroom, Rachel's relationship with cameraman Nate takes a turn when she discovers she might be pregnant. Later, in the doctor's office, Rachel is informed that in addition to not being pregnant, she has a condition that may make it impossible for her to ever have children.
13	"Karma"	Anne Kenney & Janet Tamaro	October 9, 2002	13
When the accused murderer, and father, of a teenage girl is released for lack of evidence, LeClaire sees it as her chance to redeem her falling ratings with a surprise interview. The orchestrated meeting between dead girl's father and mother produce tragic results. Kozyck balks when Jack Barnes suggests I-24 promote a tabloid show running on Barnes-owned independent stations, changing his mind only when he decides to assign intern Jacqui Savard the piece as her introduction to the industry. Kozyck's delighted when Savard innocently digs up scandalous dirt on the show's star, causing a red-faced Barnes to cancel the fluff piece.

== Reception ==
Manuel Mendoza of The Dallas Morning News rated the series a B− say that it "tries to do for journalism what The West Wing does for politics — make it sexy again". However, Mendoza goes on to say that the series "is not as snappily written or as heroically shot as The West Wing, but it has the same chaotic, frenetic energy". Preston Turegano of The San Diego Union-Tribune said the pilot episode is "predictable, familiar and mired with some cliches" before conceding that the show has "some original and humorous moments". Joanne Ostrow of The Denver Post called it a "smart, expensive, well-cast series", "even if it's an uneven effort".
