= My Super Psycho Sweet 16 =

2009 American TV series or program

- Promotional poster
- Genre: Horror; Slasher
- Written by: Scott Thomas; Jed Elinoff
- Directed by: Jacob Gentry
- Starring: Julianna Guill; Lauren McKnight; Chris Zylka; Matt Angel; Alex Van; Damien Haas
- Music by: Ben Lovett
- Country of origin: United States
- Original language: English

Production
- Producers: Alexander A. Motlagh; Chris White
- Cinematography: Thomas C. Bingham
- Editor: Matt Blundell
- Running time: 84 minutes
- Production companies: In Cahoots Media, Inc.; The Popfilms Movie Company; MTV Production Development
- Budget: $1.5 million

Original release
- Network: MTV
- Release: October 23, 2009

Related
- My Super Psycho Sweet 16: Part 2

My Super Psycho Sweet 16 is a 2009 American made-for-TV slasher film, based on the MTV show, My Super Sweet 16. The film follows two girls: outcast Skye Rotter (Lauren McKnight), and the spoiled Madison Penrose (Julianna Guill) who hosts her sweet sixteen at an abandoned roller skating rink, where a masked killer begins murdering the party patrons.

== Plot ==
Madison Penrose, a wealthy and selfish high school student, is preparing for her Sweet 16. Madison decides to have her party at the Roller Dome, a once popular roller skating rink with a violent history. Despite her father's objections towards having the party there, Madison convinces him otherwise. A flashback reveals that Charlie Rotter, the owner of the Roller Dome, murdered two teenagers for insulting him and dismembered four others before his 6-year-old daughter, Skye, called the police, leading to his arrest. A news report reveals that Charlie was believed to have been killed in a bus accident while being transported to prison.

Ten years later, Skye, now a high school student, aspires to become an artist and lives with her aunt, Sarah. As the daughter of a serial killer, Skye is ridiculed by her classmates, especially Madison. One day at school, Skye runs into Madison's ex-boyfriend, Brigg Jenner and his best friend, Kevin Donaldson. Kevin insults Skye and she jokes about him being gay for Brigg, leaving Kevin embarrassed. Afterwards, Skye and Brigg flirt with one another and they become friends. Olivia Wade, one of Madison's best friends, witnesses the encounter and rushes to the library to tell her and their other best friend, Chloe Anderson. After learning what had happened, Madison decides that Skye needs to be punished. Later that day after swimming class, Skye discovers her gym locker covered in red paint and her clothes cut up, along with a message warning Skye to stay away from Brigg. Lilly McFadden, an acquaintance of Madison's, arrives and tells Skye that Madison was responsible. Lilly admits to Skye that she actually hates Madison and encourages Skye to seek vengeance against her by hooking up with Brigg, but she refuses. Just as Skye is about to leave the locker room, she is confronted by Madison and her friends. Madison harasses and taunts Skye, claiming that Brigg has no interest in being with her.

After school, Brigg spots Skye walking alone and offers her a ride home. During the drive, Brigg asks Skye out on a date and she accepts. The next morning, Madison hands out invitations for her Sweet 16 to several classmates. Wanting to make Skye jealous, Madison deliberately hands one to Brigg in front of her. While spending time with Skye at her house, her best friend, Derek McNamara, reveals his plan to crash Madison's party and asks Skye join him, but she refuses due to the party taking place at the Roller Dome. Brigg arrives at Skye's house and tells her he has to cancel their date because Madison expects him to show up at her party. Skye tries ending their relationship, but Brigg kisses her and promises to spend more time with her. After Brigg leaves, Skye decides to crash the party with Derek. Waiting in the parking lot of the Roller Dome, Skye texts Lilly for help getting inside the building, so Lilly leaves a backdoor unlocked for Skye and Derek to sneak into, but not before Skye notices another door has been left open. Inside the Roller Dome, the party planner, who is 35, makes inappropriate advances towards the underage Madison, who brushes him off. Afterwards, he is mutilated with a spear by Charlie, who had in fact survived the bus crash.

Meanwhile, Derek tries hitting on several girls to no avail, but eventually crosses paths with Lilly. Having made a strong impression with one another, Lilly tells Derek to meet her in the basement. While waiting for Lilly, Derek is discovered by Kevin and threatens to have him kicked out of the party. Upon finding Charlie's mask, Derek uses it to scare Kevin off, prompting Kevin to kick Derek to the ground and lock him inside the storage room. Kevin returns and tells Madison that Derek crashed her party just as she notices Skye skating and laughing with Brigg, infuriating her. After a drunken Lilly hears Derek screaming for help, she frees him and the two hook up. Later that night, Skye sees her father standing on the balcony, but when Skye unmasks him, she realizes it is actually Kevin pulling a cruel prank on her as payback for making fun of him earlier. After Skye leaves devastated, Charlie grabs Kevin by the throat and severely beats him to death, retrieving his mask afterwards. Meanwhile, Chloe tells Olivia her plan to prank Skye by ambushing her in the bathroom and spraying her with a fire extinguisher. When Chloe asks Olivia to spill a drink on Skye, she initially refuses to help, but Chloe convinces her to follow through with her plan.

After a jealous Madison walks up to Brigg and kisses him despite his objections, Skye walks in on the two of them, leaving in disgust. Despite Madison's attempts at reconciliation, Brigg makes it clear that their relationship is over. Brigg tries explaining to Skye what happened, but she refuses to listen, tearfully telling him that she was better off being an outcast. Skye tries calling Derek on her cellphone, but he tells her that he's busy as the call drops. In the bathroom, Chloe, believing Skye is approaching, sprays the fire extinguisher, but Charlie grabs it from Chloe and bludgeons her to death. Outside the Roller Dome, Lilly finds Madison's birthday present, a silver BMW, in the parking lot and carves "Happy Sweet 16" with a key. Unbeknownst to Lilly, Charlie is inside the car and tries to run her over. Lilly runs upstairs to get back inside, but Charlie grabs her and slashes her throat with a sword. While Madison's father gives a heartfelt birthday speech, Olivia goes to use the bathroom and finds Chloe's dead body. A hysterical Olivia rolls out screaming for help, but Charlie appears and beheads her with an axe. Olivia's headless body knocks over Madison's sushi cake, causing the horrified guests to run outside screaming.

Madison blames Skye for ruining her party and becomes physically confrontational just as Charlie appears, locking the front entrance. The girls try to run out through the back exit, but their path is blocked by the party planner's eviscerated body. Charlie chases after the girls, but they are able to run away and reunite with Brigg. Charlie chases the three to the edge of the balcony, where Brigg challenges him to a fight and Derek uses the disk jockey booth to flash spotlights in Charlie's face, distracting him long enough for Skye and Madison to escape. Brigg and Charlie exchange several blows, culminating in Charlie throwing Brigg off the balcony. With Brigg presumably dead, Charlie jumps off the balcony and knocks out Madison. Skye and Derek run towards the front entrance, but Charlie grabs Derek and strangles him. When Skye begs her father to spare Derek, Charlie throws him outside and locks the doors. Afterwards, Charlie unmasks himself and has a bittersweet reunion with his daughter. In the basement, both Madison and Skye wake up with their hands tied to a table. Skye reveals to Madison that she tried to convince her father that Madison was a good person and should be spared, but he was unmoved, only seeing Madison as a monster.

When Madison attempts to downplay the severity of her actions, Skye calls her a bully and condemns her for her cruelty. After Charlie unties Skye, he gives her a knife and tells her to kill Madison, who begs for her life and apologizes to Skye for everything she did to her. Skye appears to comply, but instead stabs Charlie in the leg and rushes to free Madison, but she struggles with untying the ropes. Losing patience, Madison continues to blame Skye for the murders and threatens to make her life miserable if she doesn't hurry. Once untied, an ungrateful Madison shoves Skye to the ground so she can get to the exit first, but Charlie grabs Madison's leg while Skye rushes to the exit. Struggling to break free from Charlie, Madison continues insulting Skye as she begs for help. Having had enough of Madison mistreating her, Skye closes the gate and locks her inside with Charlie. Skye wishes Madison a happy birthday and walks upstairs while Madison yells disdainful remarks towards her. After the police arrive and Skye tells them where her father is located, Brigg regains consciousness. A despondent Skye runs into Derek in the parking lot, but she ignores him. Skye steals Madison's car and drives off just as the police enter the basement and discover Madison dead and Charlie missing.

Several days later, Brigg wakes up in a hospital with Skye sitting at his bedside. Without warning, Skye repeatedly stabs Brigg to death as he screams in pain, but he suddenly awakens to a nurse calming him down, realizing it was just a nightmare. Brigg asks the nurse for Skye's whereabouts, but she tells him that nobody has seen her in several days. After the nurse leaves the room, Brigg turns over and notices a folded piece of paper sitting on a desk next to his bed. Brigg unfolds it and sees a self portrait of Skye, realizing that she had visited him at some point while he was sleeping.

== Cast ==
- Julianna Guill as Madison Penrose
- Lauren McKnight as Skye Rotter
  - Lauren Eichner as Young Skye
- Chris Zylka as Brigg Jenner
- Matt Angel as Derek McNamara
- Alex Van as Charlie Rotter
- Maia Osman as Olivia Wade
- Susan Griffith as Chloe Anderson
- Joey Nappo as Kevin Donaldson
- Leandra Terrazzano as Lilly McFadden
- Ric Reitz as Mr. Penrose
- Kathleen Batson as Mrs. Penrose
- Shannon Eubanks as Aunt Sarah
- Chad McKnight as Party Planner
- Damien Haas as Craig
- Brytni Lavender as Karen

== Production ==
Director Jacob Gentry worked on the film with his long-time friend Alex Motlagh. Gentry was not a fan of reality shows, figuring they are "the lowest form of entertainment you have". However, once he started watching My Super Sweet 16, the reality series the producers had wanted to base the film on, he had a realization that it is the perfect scenario for a horror film. Gentry went on to say he was aware that the film "is clearly in the "slasher genre" where there are rules viewers expect will be followed. It's like playing the blues, you want to give it your spin but you don't want to interrupt the formula too much. You still have to play the blues. In this case, we don't want to reinvent the wheel".

Filming took place in Atlanta, where Gentry and Motlagh grew up. The film never mentions Atlanta, but does show the city's skyline at the very end. Gentry told Radio and TV Talk: "There are things shown that makes it clear it's Atlanta if you know Atlanta". One of the characters, Madison, also makes reference to flying a stylist in 3,000 miles from Los Angeles, making it evident that the film is set somewhere on the East Coast. Gentry added: "We [also] wanted to make it every city, not too region specific. We wanted it to connect with anyone". The high school scenes were mostly filmed at Henry W. Grady High School, including the library, locker room and gym. Shots were also filmed at Sprayberry High School. All of the minor actors lived in Atlanta, making casting much easier. Thousands of actresses auditioned for the role of Madison Penrose, according to casting directors, but Julianna Guill seemed "perfect for the role".

== Soundtrack ==
The songs below were all featured in the film:

Artist	Title
The All-American Rejects	"The Wind Blows"
Denali	"Relief"
Thrice	"In Exile"
AFI	"Miss Murder"
The DNC	"The Way You Like It"
The Actions	"The Real Thing"
Limp Bizkit	"Nookie"
Boom Bip	"Red Room"
The Coast	"Circles"
Cotty	"Put Cha In Ya Place"
Nonstop Music	"Military Parade"
The Coast	"All Farewells"
Arizona	"Diventa Blue"
The Coast	"Evening's "Heights"
War Stories	"Because I Love You"
Electric Owls	"Put, the Candle, Back!"
Adrift Da Belle	"DUN-EZ (Keep Workin' Baby)"
Awesome New Republic	"Glowing Light"
Naira	"Fly Hustle, Fresh, Grind"
The Honor Roll	"Birthday"
War Stories	"TV"
Electric Valentine	"Beat Drop"
The Lab	"Bionic Hand"
Awesome New Republic	"Florida"
Naira	"Countdown"
Thrice	"Wood & Wire"
Miike Snow	"Plastic Jungle"
Something About Vampires and Sluts	"Burning Bridges"
Fight Like Apes	"Lend Me Your Face"
Chumbawamba	"Tubthumping"
Charlie White	"We Love To Shop (Teen Dance/Bim Bop Remix)"

== Critical reception ==
The film was generally well received by audiences. It delivered the network's strongest rating in the time period in over a year and a half. Among female teens, the film ranked #1 in its time period versus all ad-supported TV competition, and #2 overall across all television competition, behind only Disney. Scott Foy of Dread Central rated it 2.5 stars and wrote: "Too much of My Super Psycho Sweet 16 is just a regurgitating of teen movie clichés with the emphasis more on the romantic triangle and teen bullying side of the plot than the masked psychopath randomly hacking and slashing party patrons".

== Unrated version ==
Airings on MTV are slightly edited; iTunes and DVD releases are uncut, featuring a bit more gore. Edited scenes include Craig's death, showing the pool stick impaling him; the party-planner's corpse in the chase scene is shown longer; and Brigg's dream in the end is longer.

== Home release ==
My Super Psycho Sweet 16 was released on DVD on October 18, 2010, to coincide with the premiere of the sequel a week later on October 22. It is the unrated version and contains no special features. It is available to buy on Amazon.com and to download on the iTunes Store. Due to several complaints about the DVD just being a burnt copy of the film, Paramount Home Entertainment announced a Blu-ray Combo Pack edition, but no official release date has been set.

== Sequels ==
The film was followed by two sequels, My Super Psycho Sweet 16: Part 2 (2010) and My Super Psycho Sweet 16: Part 3 (2012).
