= The Signal (2007 American film) =

- Directed by: David Bruckner; Dan Bush; Jacob Gentry
- Written by: David Bruckner; Dan Bush; Jacob Gentry
- Produced by: Jacob Gentry; Alexander A. Motlagh
- Starring: A. J. Bowen; Anessa Ramsey; Justin Welborn
- Edited by: David Bruckner; Dan Bush; Jacob Gentry; Alexander Motlagh
- Music by: Ben Lovett
- Production companies: POPfilms; Shoreline Entertainment
- Distributed by: Magnolia Pictures
- Release dates: January 22, 2007 (Sundance Film Festival); February 22, 2008 (United States)
- Running time: 103 minutes
- Country: United States
- Language: English
- Budget: $50,000
- Box office: $401,462

The Signal is a 2007 American horror film written and directed by independent filmmakers David Bruckner, Dan Bush and Jacob Gentry. It is told in three parts, in which all telecommunication and audiovisual devices transmit only a mysterious signal turning people mad and activating murderous behaviour in many of those affected.

The film's three interconnected chapters ("transmissions") are presented in a nonlinear narrative. Each of them manifests elements of (besides the overall genre of psychological horror), respectively, splatter film, black comedy, and a post-apocalyptic love story. The Signal was met with a mixed but largely positive critical reception.

== Plot ==
Mya is cheating on her husband, Lewis, with Ben. Ben asks Mya to leave the city with him, but she remains noncommittal. As Mya exits, Ben turns the television on and watches a bizarre psychedelic sequence of images. Mya listens to a compact disc given to her by Ben, but she is menaced by men who are acting strangely in a parking garage. When she reaches her apartment building, she finds more people behaving strangely. Unknown to Mya, a static-like interference coming through communications media has amplified people's negative emotional traits, causing them to act irrationally and, in most cases, violently.

=== Transmission 1: Crazy in Love ===
Written and directed by David Bruckner.

Once inside her apartment, Lewis and two friends, Jerry and Rod, attempt to fix the TV, but Lewis beats Jerry to death over a minor argument. Mya flees in panic, leaving Rod and Lewis in a struggle, but finds the whole building in chaos. Mya hides in a nearby apartment until morning. When she re-enters her home, she finds Lewis unconscious and bound to a chair. He awakens to see her leave while listening to Ben's compact disc. Mya encounters Rod, who drags her into a janitor's closet and tells her of his struggle to survive. It becomes evident that the signal affects each person differently, and Rod may also be crazy, though he seems to largely have control of his judgment. Together, they escape and attempt to drive to safety. But after being shot by a policewoman and almost left behind by Mya, Rod becomes more violent and attacks Mya, who crashes the car. Rod is incapacitated and trapped in the vehicle, while Mya flees, telling a stranger named Clark that she is going to the train station.

=== Transmission 2: The Jealousy Monster ===
Written and directed by Jacob Gentry.

Ben finds Lewis duct-taped and loosens his bonds. Lewis knocks Ben unconscious and puts him in the back of a pest control van. At a nearby apartment, a woman named Anna has killed her husband in self-defense but has continued planning for a party as if nothing has happened. Clark, Anna's neighbor and a conspiracy theorist, soon arrives. The two attempt to understand what is happening, and Clark admits that he decapitated Rod after Rod violently attacked him. Eventually Lewis arrives at the apartment after seeing Mya's crashed car. At first, Lewis befriends Anna and Clark, and they convince themselves that none of them have been affected by the signal. Lewis' violent and paranoid tendencies cause him to kill Anna's niece, Laura, who arrives seeking help. He dismisses the act as defending Anna, but Clark convinces him not to attack the next arrival, Jim, who is apparently oblivious of the situation. While Anna hallucinates that Clark is her husband, Lewis hallucinates that Jim is Ben, taunting him. He beats Jim to death, pins Clark to a chair using kitchen knives, and blinds Anna with insecticide. Convinced she knows nothing about Mya, Lewis forces Anna to ingest the poison. He exposes Clark to the signal and interrogates him. Ben, having woken up and freed himself from Lewis's van, enters the apartment and knocks out Lewis.

=== Transmission 3: Escape from Terminus ===
Written and directed by Dan Bush.

Lewis wakes up and follows Ben and Clark. He attempts to kill them in a tool shed, but they fight him off and escape. Ben convinces Clark the signal is a lie, breaking its effect on him, and Clark informs Ben where Mya was headed. Ben and Clark run through the now mostly-dead city and arrive at the train station. There, they find Mya tied to a chair, being forced to watch the signal by Lewis. Lewis attacks them and strangles Clark to unconsciousness. Ben uses Lewis's own paranoia against him, tricking Lewis into believing that their roles are reversed. Lewis punches a signal-broadcasting TV in a frustrated rage, electrocuting himself.

The story ends ambiguously. Ben, Mya, and Clark stock up on supplies, then Clark leaves. However, the next scene reveals Mya still tied to the chair, seemingly catatonic. Ben places Mya's headphones on her, and she closes her eyes, a tear rolling down her cheek.

== Cast ==
- Anessa Ramsey as Mya Denton
- Justin Welborn as Ben Capstone
- A. J. Bowen as Lewis Denton
- Scott Poythress as Clark
- Sahr Ngaujah (as Sahr) as Rod
- Cheri Christian as Anna
- Chad McKnight (as Chadrian McKnight) as Jim
- Matthew Stanton (as Matt Stanton) as Jerry
- Suehyla El-Attar as Janice

== Production and release ==
The Signal was created by four filmmakers who have been collaborating since 1999 in Atlanta, Georgia and each of its chapters of which had different directors during shooting. The film was completed for the 2007 Sundance Film Festival on a budget of only $50,000 and shot over the course of 13 days. The film premiered January 22, 2007 at the Sundance Film Festival, where it was acquired by Magnolia Pictures, and released on DVD and Blu-ray on June 10, 2008.

After long delay due to the search for a song to replace an unlicensed cover of Lou Reed's "Perfect Day" by Jon Thomas Hall in the soundtrack, the film was theatrically released on February 22, 2008. The song finally used is a cover of Joy Division's "Atmosphere" by Ola Podrida. As a promotion for the film, a new short podcast was released bi-weekly through a horror film news site Bloody Disgusting. On February 23, 2008, it was reported that two men were stabbed by a stranger in a Fullerton, California movie theatre during a showing of The Signal; one of them suffered non life-threatening injuries to his arm, while the other suffered a lung puncture.

The home media release includes an audio commentary from the directors, deleted scenes, the making-of featurette, the complete short film The Hap Hapgood Story that was shown on TV in the introduction sequence of The Signal, as well as three short (each around four-minute long) additional "transmissions" featuring entirely different new characters and locations ("Transmission 14: Technical Difficulties", "Transmission 23: The Return", and "Transmission 37: Crosstown Traffic" by Jacob Gentry). Gentry, who also directed the second part of the film, shared his bonus featurette on Vimeo.

== Reception ==
Not content to go the usual "zombie apocalypse" route (where the narrative follows a band of survivors coping with hordes of crazies), the creative triptych have broached larger, more philosophical ideas. (...) It's chilling because there are no simple "heroes and villains" on these terms, not even "Us vs. Them." If psychosis and paranoia were communicable in this manner, "Them" could be "Us," and we would have absolutely no way of knowing.

— Aaron Gillot, Filmmaker

The Signal received 59% positive reviews at Rotten Tomatoes, with the website's consensus stating, "The Signal is gruesome, funny, and has big thoughts about society, but those disparate elements fail to come together convincingly." Its average rating at Metacritic is 63/100 (generally favorable reviews). In 2012, Total Film included it on their list of the best independent horror films, noting that if The Signal had a bigger budget "it would have had more room to explore its big ideas."

In a review for The Boston Globe, Wesley Morris wrote that while the film's episodes vary in their quality (he opined that the first is "by far the most impressive"), "the filmmaking stays sharp and the acting maintains its ferocity." On the other hand, Owen Gleiberman of Entertainment Weekly called it a poor mix of Poltergeist, Invasion of the Body Snatchers, Re-Animator, Shivers and Shaun of the Dead.

Karen Kemmerle of Tribeca Film recommended this "surreal, primal, unexpected and unsettling journey through a society gone mad", and stated that "the style of the film is reminiscent of those great 70s horror movies—it's raw, grainy and insanely visceral," and its raw and low budget feel "only draws to its appeal." According to Aaron Gillot of Filmmaker, "for such a modest movie ... The Signal is creative, intelligent, and one of the few movies that truly immerses the viewer in the terror of madness. Any fan of horror should seek it out.
