= Hellraiser (soundtrack) =

Hellraiser (2022 Original Motion Picture Soundtrack)

Film score by Ben Lovett
- Released: October 7, 2022
- Genre: Film score
- Length: 63:13
- Label: Lakeshore Records
- Producer: Ben Lovett

Ben Lovett chronology
The Beta Test (2021)	Hellraiser (2022)

Hellraiser (2022 Original Motion Picture Soundtrack) is the soundtrack to the 2022 film Hellraiser directed by David Bruckner, the eleventh installment and a reboot of the Hellraiser franchise. The musical score is composed by Ben Lovett, who adapted traditional and heavy metal sounds to the score, while also providing homage to Christopher Young's themes from the original film. One of the cues from Lovett's score "Blood Box" debuted through streaming platforms on October 4, 2022, with the full album was released by Lakeshore Records on October 7. A vinyl edition of the soundtrack was released by Mondo on the same date. The music received critical acclaim.

== Background ==
The film marked Lovett's third collaboration with Bruckner following The Ritual (2017) and The Night House (2021). He had a familiar connection with Hellraiser on the covers of the VHS boxes he saw when he was eight or nine years old, and then he referenced the original novella The Hellbound Heart by Clive Barker, and all other film adaptations, musical scores and works related to the film. Lovett felt that his inclusion in the Hellraiser franchise was "entering a world that was already very distinctive and clearly defined" citing Christopher Young's earlier score for the films and needed to re-establish the sonic terrain of the film and provide a new sound to the score. The first theme consisted of the variations of the opening notes to his composition "Resurrection" from the original film, which felt as a "fitting point of inspiration" to reimagine those ideas.

== Composition ==
Unlike the synth-heavy score for horror films, he used classical elements in the score as he wanted to have "one foot in the traditional sound of Hellraiser film and other for Bruckner's film". When it crosses over into classical music, he referenced the works of Krzysztof Penderecki and György Ligeti which required a preliminary experimentation. Lovett further recalled that while driving in a car, he heard a Rachmaninov piece that had inspired Young's original theme, where the passing phrase in C-sharp minor gave him an epiphany to spend time listening to the themes of Young, that included the Liszt piece in the film's opening sequence, which could inspire the protagonist playing at his deviant mansion and wanted something proper on that surface. He thought of putting a Roland TR-808 in the piece, using the hip hop technique of "taking a passage, playing it on the piano, looping it, and putting a trap beat on it" which provided a "familiar and different feel".

He drew inspiration from the visuals he had seen through instrumentation and produce electronic beats, while for Riley, a guitar and harp (a signature score in the first two instalments) is being played to bring a classical feel. All the harp in the score is performed by Lara Somogyi. Furthermore, he experimented with traditional sources, which included a stroh violin and gramophone horn layered to provide a unique sound. He further layered experimental bowed percussion sounds from musician Bobak Lotfipour, and provided textures of ghostly vocals using frame drums, gongs, and sheets of metal and copper. There was a prepared "bondage piano" created by sticking metal chains, wires and screws into a grand piano. Furthermore, Lovett taped ping pong balls to the piano strings, and a cowbell sitting on the bottom four strings, which was inspired from the visuals, and gave a strange harmonic sounds employed throughout the score which was "simultaneously horrible and beautiful".

== Recording ==
The score was recorded in the middle of production. Lovett did not write demo music and he and Bruckner were "constantly turning things upside down and sticking things together in and up to the final mix. When we feel that an idea is broadly working we record something and then we can manipulate those further." 80 musicians had recorded the film score in separate sections. The strings were recorded in Bratislava with the Slovak National Symphony Orchestra, brass and choir in London, harp, woodwinds and guitars in Los Angeles, and piano, percussion and synths at Echo Mountain Studios in Asheville, North Carolina, which had been Lovett's regular recording studio. Over 100 minutes of original music had been recorded for the film, although the final tracklist nearly had 63 minutes of music.

== Track listing ==
No.	Title	Length
1.	"Blood Box"	3:23
2.	"Mansion Party"	2:05
3.	"Audience With God"	3:42
4.	"Riley's Temptation"	2:40
5.	"Point of No Return"	1:56
6.	"Forbidden Invocation"	1:26
7.	"New Blood"	2:26
8.	"March of the Cenobites"	2:09
9.	"Myths & Revelations"	4:13
10.	"Puzzles of the Past"	2:50
11.	"What Is This Thing?"	2:28
12.	"Seduction & Destruction"	3:07
13.	"Torment of Desire"	3:27
14.	"Perpetual Tempest"	2:08
15.	"Hail to the Priest"	3:45
16.	"Salacious Deceit"	2:30
17.	"Cenobite Invasion"	3:27
18.	"Pleasures of Power"	2:53
19.	"Nefarious Exchange"	2:26
20.	"Such Sights to Show You"	2:24
21.	"Riley's Choice"	2:45
22.	"Apotheosis"	2:23
23.	"Hellraiser (2022) End Titles Suite"	2:40
Total length:		63:13

== Reception ==
Zanobard Reviews gave 7.5/10 to the score and wrote "It is not easy at all to score a reboot of an iconic franchise, especially one with as deep musical roots as that of Hellraiser, but Lovett has managed it very well indeed. His musical style does an excellent job of bridging old and new here, with a blend of modern-sounding electronics and percussion being present and utilised effectively across the score, while also giving way to the Christopher Young-esque loud, emphatic orchestra and dramatic choral elements in the important movie moments where they're needed." Music critic Jonathan Broxton commented "In the end, Hellraiser is a good score – easily the best score of Ben Lovett's career so far – but the parts that remain in the memory are the parts of it that reference Christopher Young's classic original scores. They accompany the film's most important scenes, provide almost all its emotional content, and completely overshadow everything new, which is wonderful for Christopher Young fans, but won't do Ben Lovett any good whatsoever."

Jack Pooley of WhatCulture summarised "Lovett smartly splits the difference by both nodding regularly to Young's work but also unfurling his own extension of it, ensuring the score is easily one of Hellraiser '22's strongest suits." Todd Gilchrist of Fangoria wrote "Lovett very shrewdly only flirts with Young's familiar themes throughout much of his score, and it (and the film) is better for it... before finally delivering that iconic melody in “Such Sights To Show You,” orchestrated almost as a triumph. For listeners, that's exactly what it is." Rob Hunter of Film School Rejects commented "Ben Lovett's score, wisely keeping Christopher Young's original theme while still building something fresh, completes the film's dangerous sensory appeal." Rosie Knight of Nerdist wrote "Ben Lovett's echoing score plays a key part in building that atmosphere. Pulsing, haunting, and at times beautiful." Richard Whittaker of The Austin Chronicle commented that Lovett "folds in the instantly recognizable violin sting from Christopher Young's original score".
