= So Undercover =

- British theatrical release poster
- Directed by: Tom Vaughan
- Written by: Allan Loeb; Steven Pearl
- Produced by: Steven Pearl; Allan Loeb; Tish Cyrus; Nigel Sinclair; Tobin Armbrust
- Starring: Miley Cyrus; Jeremy Piven; Mike O'Malley; Josh Bowman; Kelly Osbourne; Megan Park
- Cinematography: Denis Lenoir
- Edited by: Michael Berenbaum; Wendy Greene Bricmont
- Music by: Stephen Trask
- Production companies: Exclusive Media Group; Crystal City Entertainment; Scarlet Fire Entertainment; Hope Town Entertainment
- Distributed by: Millennium Entertainment
- Release dates: December 6, 2012 (United Arab Emirates); February 5, 2013 (United States)
- Running time: 94 minutes
- Country: United States
- Language: English
- Budget: $15 million
- Box office: $2.5 million

So Undercover is a 2012 American crime action comedy film directed by Tom Vaughan and written by Allan Loeb and Steven Pearl. The film stars Miley Cyrus, Jeremy Piven, and Mike O'Malley.

Young, street-smart private eye Molly is hired by the FBI to keep her eye on an important witness by going undercover in a sorority.

The project was originally conceived in 2010, with the Weinstein Company acquiring the rights, but suffered delays due to Miley Cyrus's public image at the time. The film was released in December 2012 in the United Arab Emirates and later direct-to-video in the United States on February 5, 2013. In the UK, it was released by Warner Bros. Disney ultimately acquired the distribution rights to the film and released it on Disney+ as part of its permanent worldwide catalog.

== Plot ==
Molly Morris, a Dallas based private investigator, mostly takes photos of cheating men. FBI Agent Armon Ranford interferes with one of her investigations to offer her a job with the Bureau. The task is to watch over Alex Patrone, the daughter of Senator Jason Patrone involved in an organized-crime case.

Molly is reluctant at first but ultimately decides to accept Ranford's offer as she needs money to bail her gambling father out of debt. She undergoes a makeover, then goes undercover as sorority sister Brook Stonebridge. Molly meets Sasha Stolezinsky, the head of the sorority, and other members, including Becky, Cotton Roberts, Hunter Crawford, and Alex, whom she has been hired to protect.

Telling Alex they were at the same summer camp, Molly recites something unique to the camp to gain her trust. As she meets the sisters, she quickly picks up on the false façade many of them show to fit in. Her roommate Becky is British, but is working on her southern drawl. At first, Molly thinks that Sasha may be a suspect, as she can find no background on her.

Molly also meets her love interest, Nicholas Dexter, another student at the college, making small talk about his vintage motorcycle. Nick and Alex note her finely-honed detective skills when they observe a student getting into a professor's car and she details the signs of their affair.

Snooping around Alex's room when she is out, Molly is caught by Alex's roommate Taylor Jaffe. She gets away with it by saying she is borrowing something. As Ranford insists Molly look out for people who are falsely portraying themselves, she begins to suspect Professor Nathan Talloway. She then discovers that Alex secretly goes off to his lake house.

Envious of the positive attention Molly is receiving from the other sisters, Sasha plants some items that have disappeared from various sisters in Molly's things. Ostracized by the sorority, Molly asks her dad to research her, but he calls to tell her he cannot find info on Sasha either. So, she searches her room and discovers she only changed her identity from Suzy Walters so she could start a new life rather than continue to be an outcast like in high school.

Molly continuously reports back to Ranford, who at one point tells her that Nicholas is not who he says he is and that his real name is Patrick Franklin and is the real killer who killed Molly's makeoverer Bizzy. She initially believes him, locking him up and knocking him out one night. Molly follows Alex to Talloway's home, only to discover that he is actually a federal agent. She encounters a masked gunman, from whom she escapes. She realizes it is Ranford, who drives off with a kidnapped Alex, and soon finds Talloway who working with the FBI whom Molly discover injured from a gunshot wound outside his home.

When Molly returns to the sorority house, she encounters two FBI agents working on the case. They are hesitant to believe her at first, but Molly convinces them to help solve the case with her sorority sisters. They execute the plan, rescue Alex, and corner Ranford, who is arrested. Alex gives an SD card containing the evidence for her father's case to Molly, who hands it over to the feds.

The FBI is pleased with Molly's work, so she is offered a job with them. She declines and instead decides to continue going to college, and FBI offered her father a job (as per Molly's request). Two months pass, Molly is doing surveillance of a guy Cotton is dating for her. Nicholas comes up to her, revealing they are dating and they kiss.

== Cast ==
- Miley Cyrus as Molly Morris / Brook Stonebridge
- Jeremy Piven as Armon Ranford
- Mike O'Malley as Sam Morris
- Matthew Settle as Professor Nathan Talloway
- Josh Bowman as Nicholas Dexter / Patrick Franklin
- Kelly Osbourne as Becky Slotsky
- Eloise Mumford as Sasha Stolezinsky
- Megan Park as Cotton Roberts
- Lauren McKnight as Alex Patrone
- Autumn Reeser as Bizzy
- Alexis Knapp as Taylor Jaffe
- Morgan Calhoun as Hunter Crawford
- Brittney Lisette Babin as Summer

== Production ==
=== Casting ===
In 2010, Miley Cyrus was announced as portraying Molly Morris, Mike O'Malley would portray Molly's father, Jeremy Piven would portray Armon, Kelly Osbourne would portray Becky, and Josh Bowman would portray Nicholas; Eloise Mumford, Lauren McKnight, and Matthew Settle, among others were announced to be in the cast.

=== Filming ===
Principal photography began on December 13, 2010, in Mobile, Alabama, and at Tulane University. The filming finished in January 2011. On August 15, 2011, new scenes were filmed at University of California in Los Angeles and finished days after. Filming was supposed to be held in Sydney, Australia, but this was cancelled for undisclosed reasons. This film's poster is a parody of the poster of the successful film Mean Girls.

== Release ==
In March 2011, Exclusive Media Group, the film's studio, announced that the Weinstein Company acquired the U.S. distribution rights for the film, and said, "the film will be released in October 2011 when schools are back in session." In October 2012, the U.K. theatrical trailer was released, which announced a release date of December 7, 2012. Later, distributor Millennium Films announced they had acquired the U.S. distribution rights for the film, and said that the film would have a direct-to-video release in the United States on February 5, 2013. The film has been released in theatres of nine countries worldwide; six European markets and three Asian ones. So Undercover was released in Australia on April 10 as a direct-to-video release as it was in the U.S. The film was set to be released in 2011, but it was released in 2013.

=== Critical reception ===
The film has received overwhelmingly negative reviews, with a "Rotten" rating of 6% on Rotten Tomatoes based on 16 reviews.
