= Altitude (film) =

- Teaser poster
- Directed by: Kaare Andrews
- Written by: Paul A. Birkett
- Produced by: Ian Birkett
- Starring: Jessica Lowndes; Julianna Guill; Ryan Donowho; Landon Liboiron; Jake Weary
- Cinematography: Norm Li
- Edited by: Chris Bizzocchi
- Music by: Jeff Tymoschuk
- Production companies: Escape Factory; Foundation Features
- Distributed by: Anchor Bay Entertainment
- Release date: October 26, 2010
- Running time: 88 mins
- Country: Canada
- Language: English

Altitude is a 2010 Canadian horror direct-to-video film directed by Canadian comic book writer and artist Kaare Andrews. Anchor Bay Entertainment distributed the film in North America, UK, Australia, and New Zealand.

== Plot ==
In the prologue, the mother of Sara (Jessica Lowndes) is transporting a family of three (two parents and their son) in a small aircraft. The child is extremely nervous and starts hyperventilating. Wondering why he is so afraid, the parents suddenly see an out-of-control aircraft that crashes into them, and everyone plummets to the ground.

Years later, Sara, who has recently received her pilot's license, is planning to fly to a concert with her friends: her boyfriend Bruce Parker (Landon Liboiron), her cousin Cory (Ryan Donowho), her best friend Mel (Julianna Guill) and Mel's boyfriend Sal (Jake Weary). While in the air, Bruce's nerves draw ridicule from the others and Sara invites him to take the controls. They hit some turbulence and Bruce loses control, taking them into a steep climb.

Sara tries to regain control, but a loose bolt has jammed the elevator. Only able to climb, they fly into a storm and lose radio contact. Sara explains that with the elevator jammed, they will keep climbing until they run out of fuel or reach the aircraft's ceiling. They have less than an hour's worth of fuel left; Bruce has a panic attack and is put to sleep with a choke hold by Sal. In an effort to save fuel, they jettison everything overboard. The only way to unjam the tail is to climb outside and manually remove the obstacle. Cory, who has experience as a climber, volunteers. He has climbing gear with him and a rope for use as an anchor. Sal wraps the rope around himself and after some difficulty, Cory makes it to the tail and removes the errant bolt. Sal then sees a horrifyingly giant tentacle among the clouds and loses control of the rope. Cory slips and Sal is almost pulled out of the aircraft. Panicking, he cuts the rope and Cory falls, only to be caught by the monster tentacle.

When Bruce awakens, he finds he has been tied up and learns Cory is dead, along with a monster outside. Bruce tells Sara that he was in the crash that killed her mother and his parents. Sara tries the radio again and hears a strange noise. Sal recognizes it as the monster that took Cory. Suddenly, the aircraft crashes into the monster's open mouth. Bruce looks at a page of his comic which shows a blonde woman being grabbed by tentacles. Immediately, a large tentacle grabs Mel and kills her. Bruce starts flicking through the comic book, as if he has discovered something. Sal threatens to kill Bruce for causing Mel's death and tries to throw him out, but Sara intervenes and in the ensuing confusion, Sal falls out the door and plummets to his death.

Bruce tells Sara he is causing all this; that his mind is recreating the comic book, something that happens when he gets very scared. The creature starts attacking the aircraft, and Sara demands that Bruce prove he is doing it by ending it all. His attempts just make things worse, until Sara kisses him, but is grabbed by the monster. She tells him that if he can do all this, then he can bring his parents back. After a struggle, the monster suddenly disappears and she falls back into the aircraft. As they fly out of the storm, they see another aircraft heading straight for them, carrying Bruce, his parents and Sara's mother. They manage to take control of their aircraft, and do not crash into the other.

In the altered past Sara's mother and Bruce's family have arrived at their destination intact. Sara's mother says "Everybody gets one near miss, right?", and Bruce's mom asks, "Do you think they made it?" to which Sara's mother replies "I hope so." The young Sara and Bruce are introduced to one another, holding hands and looking out into the sky.

== Cast ==
- Jessica Lowndes as Sara
- Julianna Guill as Mel
- Ryan Donowho as Cory
- Landon Liboiron as Bruce Parker
- Jake Weary as Sal
- Mike Dopud as The Colonel
- Ryan Grantham as Young Boy
- Chelah Horsdal as Mrs. Taylor

== Production ==
Originally Kaare Andrews teamed up with producer Ian Birkett, and his brother, writer Paul A. Birkett, who had a preliminary script. After spending a day at a small airfield outside of Vancouver, the trio shot "...a fake trailer for no money, you know, like 'Machete', to raise some money and it immediately got interest." With a "micro-budget" secured, further financing came from Darclight and Telefilm to raise an operating budget to over $3.5 million, enough to make a credible product. The concept of a sky-creature was part of an homage to the imagery evoked by H. P. Lovecraft.

Altitude was filmed in part at the Langley, British Columbia airport. The small light twin Piper Chieftain (C-MYZX) aircraft that was the main setting of the film was originally a salvaged airframe, but it served the purpose well as a movie set, with panels and sections that could be easily removed for shooting into the cabin. The majority of the aerial sequences involved CGI work.

== Reception ==
Many praised the overall interesting structure, the consistent pace of the movie and the unexpected twist at the end of the movie, with many stating how its originality and thoughtfulness elevated the movie's overall experience and enjoyability. In addition, numerous critics praised how the movie created an abundance of tension through numerous camera and film techniques. Furthermore, another positive of the movie was its interesting film and camera technique and special effects despite its substantially low budget for a horror movie of this scale. They stated that the blending of the computer-generated imagery and the camera shots used in such a tight and cramped location was quite impressive and better than many big budget movies. They also praised the actors ability to naturally move, fight, jump etc. despite the cramped environment they were in. However, reviewers were quick to fault the badly written script and the lack of characterisation throughout the film, decreasing the overall enjoyability of the movie. One critic wrote that the "script seem(ed) hell-bent on dragging (the movie) down". Other critics had a serious problem with the first act of the movie, with many stating it was hard to keep watching.

== Release ==
The trailer for Altitude premiered at the 2010 San Diego Comic-Con.

Altitude was released on DVD and Blu-ray on October 26, 2010.
