= Synchronicity (film) =

2015 American science fiction film

- Film poster
- Directed by: Jacob Gentry
- Written by: Jacob Gentry
- Produced by: Christopher Alender; Alexander Motlagh
- Starring: Chad McKnight; A. J. Bowen; Brianne Davis; Scott Poythress; Michael Ironside
- Cinematography: Eric Maddison
- Edited by: Jacob Gentry
- Music by: Ben Lovett
- Production companies: POPfilms; Soapbox Films
- Release dates: July 22, 2015 (FIFF); January 22, 2016
- Running time: 100 minutes
- Country: United States
- Language: English

Synchronicity is a 2015 American science fiction film written, directed, and edited by Jacob Gentry. It stars Chad McKnight, A. J. Bowen, Brianne Davis, Scott Poythress, and Michael Ironside. McKnight plays a physicist who invents a time machine and becomes suspicious that others may be trying to steal the technology. It premiered at the 2015 Fantasia International Film Festival and had a limited release in theaters and on video on demand and iTunes on January 22, 2016.

== Plot ==
Physicist Jim Beale, working with two colleagues (Chuck and Matty), invents a machine that makes time travel possible. The machine operates by creating one half of a wormhole during one run, the other half during a second run. The process is expensive and dangerous. To activate the process requires radioactive material created by KMC — a company owned by Klaus Meisner, a venture capitalist.

If the material is mishandled as part of the process, the machine will malfunction — creating a devastating explosion. During the first test, Beale receives a genetically created Dahlia flower from the wormhole. Beale cannot prove his invention actually works without Meisner's radioactive material for a second test. Meisner demands 50% ownership of the process in exchange for the material, but he gets 49%. The second test is scheduled for one week after the first.

Soon after the first test, Beale meets Abby Ross, who seems to know too much about him for their meeting to be coincidental. He is attracted to her, but also suspicious. His suspicions are apparently confirmed when Chuck calls him on his cell phone and tells Beale that Abby is not to be trusted and that the test was much more successful than they initially thought. Beale leaves Abby and rushes back to the lab, but Chuck refuses to explain further. Beale later ignores his suspicions and starts a relationship with Abby. They discover a deep bond, which is broken when Chuck's warning is confirmed: Abby tells Meisner about the flower. Meisner threatens Beale with knowledge of the flower — the intellectual property of another of his companies. Meisner extorts Beale for another 50% ownership of Beale's research, leaving Beale with 1%.

During the second test, heartbroken and not thinking clearly, Beale makes a mad dash through the machine into the wormhole, with these parting words: “You may own the Dahlia, but you don’t own me.” In an attempt to avoid losing ownership of his company, Beale had reasoned that he needed to send something through the wormhole — namely, himself — that did not belong to Meisner from an intellectual-property standpoint. He is thus transported one week into the past to the time of the first test.

Beale is convinced that on this "second run", he can outwit Meisner and Abby and prevent his research from falling into their hands. He seduces Abby but soon learns that she was honestly attracted to him: A science writer herself, she had read an article about him and crafted a fanciful story in a journal about what he must be like. Having learned more about him from Meisner and researching his work, she is powerfully attracted to him. Beale reads the fictional story but finds that it is a somewhat inaccurate representation of his work and is also unfinished.

Complications arise: The "second run" Beale becomes physically weakened, and experiences pain when in close proximity to "Jim Prime", the version of Beale who existed before the jump into the wormhole. Beale reveals himself to Chuck and Matty in the hopes of securing their help to protect the research. They both assist Beale and conceal his presence from Jim Prime, explaining several confusing interactions during the week before the second test. Beale is jealous of Jim Prime, but there is no need: Jim Prime is still suspicious of Abby, and it is clear that he will have nothing to do with her after the second test because of her betrayal.

Beale continues to weaken. He encounters Abby's journal again (this time in Matty's hands) and is confused; in the first timeline, it was at Abby's apartment. Matty says he found it in Jim's coat pocket when he came out of the wormhole. The journal is now subtly different, which confirms that Beale has jumped not back in time, but into the past of a parallel universe, slightly different from the one he left. Subtle inconsistencies Beale had not noticed in this timeline are explained. Chuck says that it is impossible for two Beales to exist in the same universe, so the "second run" Beale will die, and only Jim Prime will remain.

Beale enlists the help of Chuck and Matty in making an unscheduled wormhole to send himself into the past with his new knowledge, to try and prevent the research from being stolen. A mistake is made in the process, preventing the time jump and wasting the radioactive material.

The date of the second test arrives. Beale finds another time-displaced Jim dead in a hotel after trying to leave the city. He returns to the Grand Hotel, where he sees Abby's apparent act of betrayal was done purposefully to get more radioactive material to make the second test happen, to send Jim Prime away, and to save Beale's life. The second test happens as before, but when Abby returns to the Grand Hotel, Beale has already died.

Abby sits alone in a cafe when Jim Prime — apparently healthy — sits down across from her. Jim reveals a deep sense of attraction to Abby, and introduces himself. Abby acknowledges his similarity in appearance to the physicist "John Bain" whom she is writing a novel about. However, as far as she knew, John Bain was killed in a devastating explosion in his lab. The unspoken implication is that Jim Prime would not wither away like Beale did, as he entered a universe with no other Jim present.

== Cast ==
- Chad McKnight as Jim Beale
- A. J. Bowen as Chuck
- Brianne Davis as Abby
- Scott Poythress as Matt
- Michael Ironside as Klaus Meisner

== Release ==
Synchronicity premiered at the Fantasia International Film Festival on July 22, 2015. The film had a limited release in theaters and on video on demand and iTunes on January 22, 2016.

== Reception ==
Rotten Tomatoes reports an approval score of 48% and an average rating of 5.5/10, based on 29 reviews. The consensus states: "Synchronicity's sci-fi reach exceeds its low-budget grasp, but it has some interesting ideas and serves overall as a nifty calling card for writer-director Jacob Gentry." On Metacritic, the film holds a score of 39 out of 100 based on 10 reviews, indicating "generally unfavorable reviews".

John DeFore of The Hollywood Reporter wrote, "Connoisseurs of low-budget but serious sci-fi will applaud the film". Ken Guidry of Indiewire rated it B and wrote, "With all this in mind, Synchronicity isn't just some love letter to Blade Runner, it's actually pretty damn good in its own right." Kurt Halfyard of Twitch Film wrote that the film "is not lacking in smarts or clockwork precision, but abjectly fails to convince in its core ideas of love and fate". Steve Prokopy of Ain't It Cool News wrote, "Synchronicity has heart and humor to counter its periods of despair and angst, and it all blends together with touch of grace and ambition that science fiction lovers are going to devour." Drew Tinnin of Dread Central rated it 3.5/5 stars and wrote that the film "turns a fairly familiar sci-fi premise into something more than just a moody homage to dystopian classics like Blade Runner".
