= Julianna Guill =

American actress (born 1987)

- Born: 1987 (age 38–39); Winston-Salem, North Carolina, U.S.
- Occupation: Actress
- Years active: 2004–present
- Spouse: Ben McMillan (m. 2015)
- Children: 2

Julianna Guill (born 1987) is an American actress best known for her lead role as Marybeth Pickett on the Paramount+ neo-western crime series Joe Pickett (2021–2023). She is also known for her roles as Christie DeWitt on the TBS comedy drama series Glory Daze (2010–2011), Becca Riley on the Bravo comedy series Girlfriends' Guide to Divorce (2014–2017), and Jessie Nevin on the FOX medical drama series The Resident (2018–2023).

Guill had roles in films such as Friday the 13th (2009), Crazy, Stupid, Love (2011), The Apparition (2012), and Alex of Venice (2014), and also appeared as Scarlet Hauksson on the web series My Alibi (2008–09).

== Early life ==
Julianna Guill is a 2005 graduate of Richard J. Reynolds High School.

== Career ==
Guill has made numerous guest appearances on television programs such as One Tree Hill, CSI: Miami, 90210, How I Met Your Mother, Criminal Minds and CSI: Crime Scene Investigation. In 2009, she appeared in the starring role of Katy in the direct-to-video film Road Trip: Beer Pong, a sequel to the comedy film Road Trip (2000).

Guill had a supporting role as Bree in the slasher film Friday the 13th, a 2009 remake of the original film. That same year, Guill starred as sweet 16 birthday girl and queen bee Madison Penrose in the MTV slasher television film, My Super Psycho Sweet 16, which premiered on October 23, 2009. She reprised the role in the sequel My Super Psycho Sweet 16: Part 2, which premiered on October 22, 2010. The following week saw the release of the horror film Altitude, with Guill starring opposite Jessica Lowndes.

In 2010, Guill was cast in the lead role of Christie DeWitt on the TBS comedy drama series Glory Daze. That same year, she starred on the web series Sweety for the web site Sweety High, after starring in the web series My Alibi the previous year.

In 2011, Guill appeared in the romantic comedy film Crazy, Stupid, Love, and in 2012, she appeared in the horror film The Apparition. She guest starred on the NBC comedy series Community as Head Cheerleader in "A Fistful of Paintballs". Guill is friends with Community star Alison Brie, with whom she previously co-starred in My Alibi. They and fellow My Alibi co-star Cyrina Fiallo perform together as a singing group The Girls. From 2014 to 2017, she played the recurring role of Becca Riley on the Bravo comedy drama series Girlfriends' Guide to Divorce.

Since 2018, Guill has had a recurring role as Jessie Nevin, the sister of Nic Nevin (Emily VanCamp), on the FOX medical drama series, The Resident. In 2021, she was cast as Marybeth Pickett, the wife of the titular character, on the Paramount+ neo-western crime series Joe Pickett.

== Filmography ==
=== Film ===
Year	Title	Role	Notes
2009	2 Dudes and a Dream	Stacy	
2009	Friday the 13th	Bree Turner	
2009	Fired Up!	Another Girl	
2009	Road Trip: Beer Pong	Katy Hartman	Direct-to-video film
2010	Five Star Day	Vanessa	
2010	Costa Rican Summer	Eva	
2010	Altitude	Mel	Direct-to-video film
2011	Crazy, Stupid, Love	Madison	
2012	A Green Story	Rebecca	
2012	Mine Games	Claire	Direct-to-video film; also known as The Evil Within
2012	The Apparition	Lydia	
2013	Crystal Lake Memories: The Complete History of Friday the 13th	Herself	Documentary film
2014	Alex of Venice	Anya	
2015	Bad Night	Viceroy	
2015	Christmas Eve	Ann	
2016	Lawless Range	Margaret Donnelly	
2016	Captain America: Civil War	Stark's assistant	
2016	Killing Poe	Brittany Wilcox	
2017	Becoming Bond	Receptionist	Documentary film

=== Television ===
Year	Title	Role	Notes
2004–2005	One Tree Hill	Money Girl / Ashley	Guest role; 2 episodes
2006–2007	CSI: Miami	Toll Booth Girl / Kelly	Guest role; 2 episodes
2007	CSI: Crime Scene Investigation	Monica	Episode: "Goodbye and Good Luck"
2009	How I Met Your Mother	Maiden	Episode: "The Sexless Innkeeper"
2009	My Super Psycho Sweet 16	Madison Penrose	Television film
2009–2010	90210	Savannah Montgomery	Guest role; 2 episodes
2010	Cold Case	Bunny Hargreave (1974)	Episode: "The Runaway Bunny"
2010	Accidentally on Purpose	Melissa	Episode: "Back to School"
2010	The Subpranos	Sunshine	Recurring role; 2 episodes
2010	My Super Psycho Sweet 16: Part 2	Madison Penrose	Television film
2010–2011	Glory Daze	Christie DeWitt	Main role; 10 episodes
2011	Community	Head Cheerleader	Episode: "A Fistful of Paintballs"
2011	Psych	Vivienne	Episode: "Shawn, Interrupted"
2012–2013	Underemployed	Bekah	Recurring role; 7 episodes
2013	Bad Samaritans	Drew	Main role; 5 episodes
2013	Criminal Minds	Ashley Fouladi	Episode: "Gatekeeper"
2014	Cougar Town	Haylee Gazelian	Episode: "Too Good to Be True"
2014	Selfie	Corynn Mcwatters	Episode: "Wishing Well"
2014–2018	Girlfriends' Guide to Divorce	Becca Riley	Recurring role; 17 episodes
2016	Rush Hour	Dr. Alice Rosenberger	Recurring role; 2 episodes
2016	Summer in the City	Taylor Morgan	Television film
2016	Sunset PPL	Talia	Unsold television pilot
2016	Rosewood	Astrid	Episode: "Bacterium & the Brothers Panitch"
2017	The Mindy Project	Dina	Episode: "Dibs"
2017	Psych: The Movie	Dr. Butterfly McMillan	Television film
2018–2019	The Resident	Jessie Nevin	Recurring role; 11 episodes
2019	Into the Dark	Kara Wheeler	Episode: "Treehouse"
2019	Grounded for Christmas	Nina	Television film
2020	Christmas on the Vine	Brooke	Television film
2021–2023	Joe Pickett	Marybeth Pickett	Main role; 20 episodes

=== Web series ===
Year	Title	Role	Notes
2008–2009	My Alibi	Scarlet Hauksson	Main role; 18 episodes
2010	Sweety	Tracie	Main role; 6 episodes
2016	Relationship Status	Talia	Recurring role; 2 episodes

=== Music video ===
Year	Title	Role	Artist
2009	"I Wanna"	Ex-Girlfriend	The All-American Rejects
2011	"Money Money"	Girlfriend	Jordy Towers
