= The Apparition (2012 film) =

2012 supernatural horror film by Todd Lincoln

- Theatrical release poster
- Directed by: Todd Lincoln
- Written by: Todd Lincoln
- Produced by: Alex Heineman; Andrew Rona; Joel Silver
- Starring: Ashley Greene; Sebastian Stan; Tom Felton
- Cinematography: Daniel Pearl
- Edited by: Jeff Betancourt; Tom Elkins; Harold Parker
- Music by: Tomandandy
- Production companies: Dark Castle Entertainment; Studio Babelsberg
- Distributed by: Warner Bros. Pictures (United States); StudioCanal (Germany)
- Release dates: August 24, 2012 (United States); December 13, 2012 (Germany)
- Running time: 82 minutes
- Country: United States
- Language: English
- Budget: $17 million
- Box office: $11.3 million

The Apparition is a 2012 American supernatural horror film written and directed by Todd Lincoln, in his directorial debut, and starring Ashley Greene, Sebastian Stan, Tom Felton, Julianna Guill, and Rick Gomez. The plot follows three college students who, after the death of their friend, must battle a supernatural force they summoned themselves. The film was loosely inspired by the Philip experiment conducted in 1972.

The film was universally panned by both film critics and audiences, with chief complaints being the complete lack of scares, poor script, borrowing from other better horror films, and for spoiling the ending in the theatrical trailer. The film was also a box office bomb, and was cited by critics as one of the worst films of 2012.

== Plot ==
On May 21, 1973, six people conduct The Charles Experiment, a parapsychological experiment, in which they stare at a drawing of a deceased man, Charles Reamer, hoping to summon his spirit. Years later, four college students, Patrick (Tom Felton), Lydia (Julianna Guill), Ben (Sebastian Stan) and Greg (Luke Pasqualino) attempt to recreate the Charles Experiment on a larger scale by using modern technology. During the experiment, something attacks the students and pulls Lydia into the wall vanishing.

Some time later, Ben and his girlfriend Kelly (Ashley Greene) are living together. One evening, they discover strange burn marks on their counters. Kelly finds both doors wide open, even though they had locked them. They decide to change the locks and install surveillance cameras. Later, Kelly finds a large amount of mold and spores on the laundry room floor while Ben finds even more in a crawlspace. Ben gets 36 "urgent" emails from Patrick that first inform him of a new attempt at the Charles Experiment, followed by a warning that "containment failed" and finally "you are in danger".

After witnessing an apparition, the couple go to a hotel, but they are attacked there as well. As they flee, they receive a call from Patrick and meet him. Patrick explains that the initial experiment enabled a malevolent entity to enter their world, but that he has built a room surrounded by a negative current that he believes protects him from it. They return to Kelly and Ben's house to try a new experiment to contain the entity. During the experiment, the house begins to shake and break apart, then abruptly stops. While Kelly and Ben are outside, Patrick is pulled into the darkness and vanishes. Unable to find Patrick, they flee to the safety chamber in his house.

Inside the house, they hear Patrick's personal log being played back, including information about the members of the original experiment. Of the original six, two died, one committed suicide and the other three disappeared. After entering the safety chamber, Ben disappears. Kelly exits the chamber and finds Ben's contorted corpse. Patrick's narration explains that the entity gets stronger with each person it claims, and that it will wear its victims down until they are too weak to resist.

With no escape, Kelly wanders around, and enters an empty Costco. She walks to the camping section, enters a tent and waits to be killed by the entity, having fully given up resisting. A number of hands appear from behind and the entity slowly grabs hold of her as the movie cuts to black.

== Cast ==
- Ashley Greene as Kelly
- Sebastian Stan as Ben
- Jerome Ponce as young Ben
- Tom Felton as Patrick
- Julianna Guill as Lydia
- Rick Gomez as Mike
- Luke Pasqualino as Greg
- Anna Clark as Maggie
- Tim Williams as Office Executive
- Marti Matulis as Apparition
- John Grady as Apparition
- Suzanne Ford as Mrs. Henley

== Production ==
In May 2009, Todd Lincoln was named as the director and screenwriter of the project. Joel Silver cast Twilight actress Ashley Greene for the lead role of Kelly on November 5, 2009. On December 9, Lincoln announced via Twitter that pre-production had begun on the project, which was financed by Dark Castle Entertainment. On January 26, 2010, Friday the 13th actress Julianna Guill was cast in the role of Lydia. Harry Potter star Tom Felton was cast on February 8, and was joined one week later by Sebastian Stan and Luke Pasqualino. Filming began on February 26, 2010, in Berlin, Germany, with other scenes being shot in Los Angeles. On March 25, Greene shot some scenes in the Anaverde neighborhood of Palmdale, California. The project marked Lincoln's directorial debut. Silver produced with Andrew Rona and Alex Heineman.

== Release ==
The film was released in the United States on August 24, 2012, in 810 theaters.

=== Home media ===
The film was released on Blu-ray and DVD on November 27, 2012.

== Reception ==
=== Critical response ===
The Apparition was criticized for its lack of originality, overuse of jump scares, poor acting and screenplay, and bad plot. It has an overall approval rating of 3% on Rotten Tomatoes, based on 61 reviews, with an average rating of 2.33/10. The consensus says, "The Apparition fails to offer anything original, isn't particularly scary, and offers so little in the way of dramatic momentum that it's more likely to put you to sleep than thrill you." On Metacritic, the film holds a score of 18 out of 100, indicating "Overwhelming dislike". Much of the film's criticisms referred to a lack of originality, and similarities to other horror films, including Ju-on: The Grudge, Ring, Paranormal Activity, and Pulse. Brian Orndof from Blu-ray.com said, "The trailer for The Apparition contained more story than the picture it was promoting. In fact, I think the trailer for The Apparition is actually more of a movie than The Apparition." Mark Dujsik agreed, saying, "It's so terrible that there might actually be more tension in the numbing first act of monotonous chores than there is in anything that follows." IndieWire called the film a "hauntingly inept chiller", feeling that the film "makes no attempts to transcend or even enliven its genre". RedEye Chicago called the film "hilariously non-scary".

=== Box office ===
The Apparition was a box office bomb. The film opened at number 12 in its opening weekend at the box office, with a gross of $2.84 million. According to Box Office Mojo, "With the unusually-low theater count and a practically non-existent marketing effort, it's clear Warner Bros. was trying to bury this movie, and they appear to have succeeded." It grossed $4.9 million domestically and $6.4 million worldwide.
