= Myndy Crist =

American actress

- Occupation: Actress
- Years active: 1995–present
- Spouse: Josh Stamberg
- Children: 2 daughters

Myndy Crist is an American actress who has appeared in more than 50 films and television series. In 2019, she received a Jury Best Actress Award at the 2019 Riverside International Film Festival for her role in the 2018 film Wake.

== Early life and career ==
Crist grew up in Marin County, California, and graduated from the UCLA School of Theater and Film. Her first onscreen role was in 1995 in an episode of Living Single, and within a few years she was playing supporting roles in films like Gun Shy (2000), Chain of Fools (2000), and Hanging Up (2000). In 2002, she starred as Janet LeClaire in the short-lived TV drama, Breaking News.

More recently, Crist has appeared in TV shows such as Satisfaction (2014), Major Crimes (2015), Code Black (2016) and The Rookie (2019). She had a supporting role in the 2013 film, Dark Skies, and a starring role in the 2018 film, Wake.

== Personal life ==
Crist was married to actor Josh Stamberg. The couple have two daughters, Vivian and Lena.

== Partial filmography ==
=== Film ===
Year	Title	Role	Notes
1996	Static	Betty Jennings	
1997	The Line	Anne	Short film
2000	Gun Shy	Myrna	
2000	Hanging Up	Dr. Kelly	
2000	Chain of Fools	Jeannie	
2000	What We Talk About When We Talk About Love	Laura	Short film
2002	The Time Machine	Jogger	
2007	The Jane Austen Book Club	Lynne	
2013	Dark Skies	Karen Jessop	
2015	Day Out of Days	Jen	
2018	Wake	Molly Harrison	

=== Television ===
Year	Title	Role	Notes
1995	Living Single	Gail	1 episode: "Legal Briefs"
1995	New York Daze	Susan	Pilot episode: "Too Something"
1997	Damian Cromwell's Postcards from America	Elizabeth Elkins	Unknown episodes
1999	The King of Queens	Jessica Wicks	1 episode: "Female Problems"
1999–2000	ER	Valerie Page	2 episodes: "How the Finch Stole Christmas", "The Domino Heart"
2001	Taking Back Our Town	Lisa LaVie	TV film
2001	Ball & Chain	Mallory Bulson	TV film
2002	The Guardian	Doris Greene	1 episode: "In Loco Parentis"
2002	Baseball Wives	Nicole Camden	Unaired TV pilot
2002	Breaking News	Janet LeClaire	13 episodes
2003	Law & Order: Special Victims Unit	Carrie Huitt	1 episode: "Futility"
2003	Without a Trace	Sarah Sellars	1 episode: "Confidence"
2003	Two and a Half Men	Wendy	1 episode: "Phase One, Complete"
2003–2004	Six Feet Under	Dana	4 episodes
2004	Cold Case	Dana Hunter	1 episode: "Factory Girls"
2004	House	Elise Snow	1 episode: "Fidelity"
2004–2005	NYPD Blue	Carly Landis	2 episodes: "Fish Out of Water", "Stoli with a Twist"
2005	24	Melissa	1 episode: "Day 4: 9:00 a.m.-10:00 a.m."
2005	CSI: Miami	Karla Jane Gardner	1 episode: "Identity"
2005	Crossing Jordan	Andrea Carruthers	1 episode: "Death Goes On"
2006	Grey's Anatomy	Mrs. Hanson	1 episode: "Staring at the Sun"
2009	Eleventh Hour	Dr. Veronica Reeves	1 episode: "Miracle"
2009	The Mentalist	Jessie Skelling	1 episode: "Carnelian, Inc."
2009	Drop Dead Diva	Mindy Billmeyer	1 episode: "The 'F' Word"
2010	Bones	Grace Redmon	1 episode: "The Predator in the Pool"
2010	My Super Psycho Sweet 16: Part 2	Carolyn Bell	TV film
2010	The Whole Truth	Melanie	1 episode: "Young Love"
2011	NCIS: Los Angeles	Emily Chambers	1 episode: "Enemy Within"
2012	90210	Lawyer	1 episode: "Forever Hold Your Peace"
2013	Emily Owens, M.D.	Nicole	1 episode: "Emily and... The Perfect Storm"
2014	CSI: Crime Scene Investigation	Rebecca Brewer	1 episode: "The Book of Shadows"
2014	Satisfaction	Gail	1 episode: "...Through Exposure"
2015	NCIS	Jennifer Vickers	1 episode: "No Good Deed"
2015	The Night Shift	Lisa Edwards	1 episode: "Moving On"
2015	Major Crimes	Selma Hewitt	1 episode: "Thick as Thieves"
2016	Code Black	Susan Stein	1 episode: "Love Hurts"
2018	Criminal Minds	Trish Gaines	1 episode: "Full-Tilt Boogie"
2019	The Rookie	Abby	1 episode: "Caught Stealing"
2019	Pearson	McDermott Partner	2 episodes: "The Rival", "The Fixer"
2021	Snowfall	Joanna Bird	2 episodes: "Expansion", "The Get Back"
