= My Super Psycho Sweet 16: Part 2 =

2010 film directed by Jacob Gentry

- Promotional poster
- Genre: Horror; Slasher
- Written by: Scott Thomas; Jed Elinoff
- Directed by: Jacob Gentry
- Starring: Lauren McKnight; Chris Zylka; Matt Angel; Stella Maeve; Alex Van; Myndy Crist; Kirsten Prout
- Music by: Ben Lovett
- Country of origin: United States
- Original language: English

Production
- Producers: Jed Elinoff; Scott Thomas; Chris White
- Cinematography: Eric Maddison
- Editor: Matt Blundell
- Running time: 85 minutes
- Production companies: In Cahoots Media, Inc. The Popfilms Movie Company; MTV Production Development

Original release
- Network: MTV
- Release: October 22, 2010

Related
- My Super Psycho Sweet 16; My Super Psycho Sweet 16: Part 3

My Super Psycho Sweet 16: Part 2 (Note: Titled onscreen as My Super Psycho Sweet 16 2) is a 2010 American made-for-TV slasher film directed by Jacob Gentry. The film premiered on MTV on October 22, 2010. It is a sequel to My Super Psycho Sweet 16 (2009) and the second installment in the film series of the same name. The film follows Skye Rotter as she attends another sweet sixteen party, where the same psycho from the first film again kills the partygoers.

The film was followed by My Super Psycho Sweet 16: Part 3 (2012).

== Plot ==
Following the events of the first film, Skye Rotter has a nightmare following the memorial for the teens murdered at the Roller-Dome. (Note: As depicted in My Super Psycho Sweet 16 (2009)) In the dream, she stabs Derek in the neck, and Brigg, seeing Skye as he is about to escape through a back door, is stabbed in the back. After waking, Skye drives away in Madison's car and takes it to a dealership. She exchanges the car and makes a deal with a shady dealer so he will not call the police.

Madison tries to start a new life in a small town Mill Basin, hundreds of miles from her hometown. The police are looking for Skye as she is the only one who really knows what happened in the Roller-Dome massacre. She goes to find her mother, Carolyn Bell, who left her at a young age to live with her murderer-to-be father. Skye realizes that her mother has a new life, a new husband, and another daughter, Alex Bell. At first Alex seems reluctant to accept Skye as her half-sister, but soon warms to her. One day at the local coffee shop, Alex and her friends Zoe and Molly come in to gossip. After Zoe introduces herself to Skye, Alex and the girls find out from a wannabe DJ and Alex's crush James, aka "Jams", that the party at his house was cancelled. Zoe comes up with an idea to have a party at "The Bone Yard", a newly-renovated club owned by Alex's father that was originally a strip club. After leaving the coffee shop, Skye drives Alex home to discover that Alex's dad has already left on a business trip, and Carolyn yells at Alex for missing her father before he left.

Meanwhile, as Alex's father, Ted Bell, is on his way to the airport, he stops by "The Bone Yard" to check on some business. A stranger—Charlie Rotter, the perpetrator of the Roller-Dome massacre and Skye's father—asks to borrow his jumper cables for his truck, and when Ted obliges, Rotter stabs him in the back and strangles him to death with a jumper cable in the trunk of his Acadia. Back in Skye's hometown, her friend Derek meets a girl named Courtney at school and they begin to date. The two are about to make out when Brigg enters the room to tell Derek that Skye finally messaged him back. Courtney shows disdain towards Skye, calling her "Psycho-Rotter". Derek and Brigg find out that Skye is hiding out in a nearby neighborhood, and they agree to go find her in the morning, with Courtney tagging along.

Skye and Alex begin to bond on a deeper level, and Alex opens up to her sister about her depression. Skye also bonds with her mother, who asks her not to tell Alex that her former husband is a murderer. On her 16th birthday, Skye receives a necklace from her mother. Skye has a nightmare of Madison angry at her for letting her die. Madison slits her own throat and sprays blood all over Skye. Panicked, Skye awakens to find that she is on the floor just like in her nightmare, implying that she sleepwalks. That morning, Alex sneaks into the Bone Yard and runs into Rotter, though she is unaware of his identity. Zoe asks Skye to steal some of Alex's depression medication for party favors, threatening to tell everyone about Rotter and the massacre. Skye daydreams about stabbing Zoe in the neck with a pencil, but reluctantly agrees to the deal and gets ready for the party.

Alex and her sister arrive at the Bone Yard and prepare for tonight's party. As the party begins, Skye seems reluctant to have any fun, while Alex indulges in the festivities. Skye tells Alex that it is her birthday. While Skye walks around the Bone Yard, it is revealed that Rotter is at the party. Derek, Brigg, and Courtney arrive at the Bone Yard to find Skye. Brigg sees Skye and they kiss, going into a separate area to have sex on a pool table. When Alex tries to make out with Jams in the back kitchen area, he goes too far and she leaves. Molly enters and she and Jams make out, until Charlie kills them both. Afterwards, Skye tells Brigg she cannot go back to her hometown with him, in fear of being ridiculed and labeled as a killer. Brigg leaves angry. Courtney tells Alex about her sister's past, and Derek and Courtney argue about her jealousy of Skye.

An angry Alex runs away. Skye then calls her mother to tell her what happened, and the latter heads to the club. Courtney fears that Derek will leave her if his feelings for Skye are rekindled. Skye goes to an abandoned area of the club and sees a birthday message in blood from her father, wishing her a happy birthday. Courtney threatens to call the police on Skye, and she and Derek make up. The reconciliation is overheard by Rotter, who locks Skye in the club to watch from above as he attacks Derek and Courtney. Derek whacks Rotter in the back with a wooden plank with nails, but this only angers Rotter and he kills Derek by smashing the plank into his neck. Skye cries for her friend, and Courtney runs away as Rotter chases her. Courtney ends up in the back kitchen area of the club and as she sees Jams' dead body, she accidentally runs into a meat tenderizer held by Rotter. As Courtney lies on the ground in pain, he smashes her face with the tenderizer. Zoe, high on the medication Skye gave her earlier, stumbles away only to run into Rotter before blacking out.

As Carolyn reaches the club to stop the party, furious, Alex sees the stripper cake brought out for display. Inside, the half-awake Zoe, who is covered in alcohol, lights a lighter and accidentally sets herself on fire, erupting from the cake in flames. The party-goers scurry out after Zoe falls on the ground outside and Brigg uses a fire extinguisher on her severely burned body. She soon dies. Brigg rushes in to find Skye. Skye finally escapes from the upper level of the club and finds her mother telling Rotter to let Alex go as he holds a knife to her throat. Rotter then reveals his present to Skye—Ted's head in a plastic bag. Alex cries and as Rotter prepares to kill Alex, Carolyn explains to Rotter that Alex is actually his daughter too, but she refused to leave Alex with him, causing Charlie to hesitate. Carolyn then blames Skye for what has happened and Rotter, offended by this, lets Alex go and slits Carolyn's throat instead, killing her. Skye and Alex run and hide but Charlie foils all their attempts. Skye refuses to let her father kill Alex and tries to convince him that she is family; Rotter admits he loves Skye. They begin a touching moment but upon seeing Alex running, goes after her instead. Just as he is about to stab her, Brigg arrives and tackles Rotter. Brigg begins to beat him up, but Skye says to let him go. As Rotter lies on the ground in pain, he tearfully tells Skye that all that he did was for her. Skye stabs him in the heart, finally killing Rotter and ending his reign of terror.

Some time later, Alex is in therapy and lives with her grandparents. Skye lives with Brigg and his family back home. Alex tells her therapist that she has no harsh feelings towards Skye for the murders of her family and friends, but she later goes into the bathroom and looks at a picture of herself and Skye on her phone. Alex smashes a mirror, suggesting that she does blame Skye for the massacre.

== Cast ==
- Lauren McKnight as Skye Rotter
- Chris Zylka as Brigg Jenner
- Matt Angel as Derek McNamara
- Kirsten Prout as Alex Bell
- Myndy Crist as Carolyn Bell
- Stella Maeve as Zoe Chandler
- Alex Van as Charlie Rotter
- Gina Rodriguez as Courtney Ramirez
- Jennifer Sun Bell as Molly Abiko
- Devin Keaton as James Feldman
- Robert Pralgo as Ted Bell
- Claire Bronson as Psychiatrist
- Alexandra Chen as Student Body President
- Julianna Guill as Madison Penrose (cameo)

== Reception ==
Scott Foy of Dread Central rated it 3/5 stars and called it "a more well-rounded, less campy feature than part one" that works.

== Release ==
The film was released on home video on November 2, 2010. The DVD contains cast interviews as the only bonus feature.
