= Ryan Sypek =

American actor and real estate broker (born 1982)

- Education: Boston University
- Occupations: Real estate broker, actor
- Years active: 2005-present
- Spouse: Kate Winston (m. 2017)
- Children: 1

Ryan Sypek is an American actor and real estate broker.

== Acting career ==
He started acting when he was in the sixth grade and also enjoyed playing baseball. He attended Wayland High School, graduating in 2000. After high school graduation, he attended Boston University, spending a semester in London at the London Academy of Music and Dramatic Art. He graduated from Boston University with a Bachelor of Fine Arts Degree. Before getting his role on Wildfire, he worked for the famous Beverly Hills Hotel, parking cars.

He played Jack Hunter in The Rose Tattoo at the Huntington Theatre in Boston in 2002. He co-starred in the ABC Family Original TV Series Wildfire, portraying Junior Davis, after initially auditioning for the role of Matt Ritter. He portrayed Sgt. Mills Evans in Private Valentine: Blonde & Dangerous, starring opposite Jessica Simpson. He was also a guest star on an episode of another popular ABC Family show, Greek, as a suitor for the lead character, Casey and as Dylan Boyd in Hollywood Heights.

== Personal life ==
In August 2016, Sypek announced his engagement to artist Kate Winston. They were married on September 23, 2017. On June 17, 2021, they welcomed their first child, a girl.

As of 2018, Sypek has been working as a real estate broker in Los Angeles.

== Filmography ==
=== Film ===
Year	Title	Role	Notes
2008	Private Valentine: Blonde & Dangerous	Sgt. Mills Evans	
2010	The Last Harbor	Matt Sharpe	
2018	My Baby Is a Bike Helmet	Josh	Short film

=== Television ===
Year	Title	Role	Notes
2005–2008	Wildfire	Kenneth "Junior" Davis Jr.	Main role
2008	Greek	Ryan Prince	Episode: "A Tale of Two Parties"
2009	How I Met Your Mother	PJ	Episode: "Mosbius Designs"
2010	Christmas Cupid	Jason Miller	TV movie
2010	Squatters	Robert	3 episodes
2011	Happy Endings	Todd	Episode: "Pilot"
2011	The Nine Lives of Chloe King	Jesse	Episode: "All Apologies"
2012	My Super Psycho Sweet 16: Part 3	Nathan Stillo	TV movie
2012	Hollywood Heights	Dylan Stone	2 episodes
2012	The Secret Life of the American Teenager	Police Officer	Episode: "Hedy's Happy Holiday House"
2013	Phys Ed	Ed	TV movie
2013	Company Town	Scott	TV movie
2014	Dads	Colt	2 episodes
2014	The Michaels	Ryan Wychowski	TV movie
2014	Family Fortune	Bartender	TV movie
2019	Hawaii Five-0	Todd	Episode: "A'ohe Pau ka 'ike i ka Halau Ho'okahi"
2024	Christmas on Christmas	Business Man	TV movie
