= The Wind Blows =

The Wind Blows may refer to:

- The Wind Blows (song), a 2009 song by The All-American Rejects
- The Wind Blows (TV series), a 2019 South Korean television series
- The Wind Blows (poem), a poem by Galaktion Tabidze
- The Wind Blows (short story), a short story by Katherine Mansfield

== See also ==
- When the Wind Blows (disambiguation)
