= Jacob Gentry =

American film director (born 1977/78)

- Born: 1977 or 1978 (age 48–49); Nashville, Tennessee, US
- Occupation: Film director
- Known for: The Signal, My Super Psycho Sweet 16 series

Jacob Gentry is an American film director, editor, and writer. He is best known for The Signal, which he co-wrote and co-directed with David Bruckner and Dan Bush. He also directed the My Super Psycho Sweet 16 trilogy and collaborated with Broken Bells on short films based on their music.

== Early life ==
Gentry was born in Nashville, Tennessee, and raised in Atlanta, Georgia. At fifteen, MTV aired his short film Terminator 3: School Day. Later, he attended the University of Georgia along with David Bruckner and A. J. Bowen. The three would later collaborate with Dan Bush on The Signal (2007).

== Career ==
Gentry's first film was Last Goodbye (2004), which starred Faye Dunaway and the children of several celebrities. Gentry was initially resistant to the idea of casting the children of celebrities but relented when he realized the gimmick could be used for publicity. He later described the film as "a messy Magnolia". In 2005, he edited the film The Lady from Sockholm. His next feature was The Signal, which traces its origins to a Surrealist game called exquisite corpse in which multiple collaborators independently contribute toward the completion of an art project. After collaborating with Bruckner and Bush on The Signal, he signed a three-picture deal with MTV and directed My Super Psycho Sweet 16 (2009) and its two sequels, My Super Psycho Sweet 16: Part 2 and My Super Psycho Sweet 16: Part 3. Although not a fan of reality television, Gentry decided to use the source material to discuss the 2008 financial crisis. Gentry was originally approached to contribute to the horror anthology V/H/S, but he was forced to decline due to Directors Guild of America technicalities. He instead suggested Bruckner, who joined the project. Gentry worked with the band Broken Bells on two short films. Gentry said that the shorts allowed him to explore new ideas and work in science fiction, his favorite genre. Gentry and musician Danger Mouse had gone to college together, and although they had not worked together professionally until then, they were friends. Gentry did not synchronize the films to the albums; instead, he worked from Danger Mouse's ideas and created independent narratives. In 2015 he released Synchronicity, after which he released Broadcast Signal Intrusion in 2021.

== Awards and nominations ==
In 2008, Gentry was nominated for the Independent Spirit John Cassavetes Award along with Bruckner and Bush for The Signal.

== Filmography ==
Film	Year	Director	Producer	Writer	Editor	Notes
Last Goodbye	2004	Yes	No	Yes	Yes	
The Lady from Sockholm	2005	No	No	No	Yes	
The Signal	2007	Yes	Yes	Yes	Yes	Segment "The Jealousy Monster"
Hysterical Psycho	2009	No	No	No	Yes	
My Super Psycho Sweet 16	2009	Yes	No	No	No	
My Super Psycho Sweet 16: Part 2	2010	Yes	No	No	No	
My Super Psycho Sweet 16: Part 3	2012	Yes	No	No	No	
After the Disco Part One: Angel and the Fool	2013	Yes	No	No	No	Short film
After the Disco Part Two: Holding On for Life	2013	Yes	No	No	No	Short film
Synchronicity	2015	Yes	No	Yes	Yes	
Broadcast Signal Intrusion	2021	Yes	No	No	No	
