= My Super Psycho Sweet 16: Part 3 =

- Promotional poster
- Genre: Horror; Slasher
- Written by: Scott Thomas; Jed Elinoff
- Directed by: Jacob Gentry
- Starring: Lauren McKnight; Kirsten Prout; Ryan Sypek; Jillian Rose Reed
- Music by: Ben Lovett
- Country of origin: United States
- Original language: English

Production
- Producers: Christopher White; Scott Thomas; Jed Elinoff
- Cinematography: Eric Maddison
- Editor: Matt Blundell
- Running time: 83 minutes
- Production companies: In Cahoots Media, Inc. The Popfilms Movie Company; MTV Production Development

Original release
- Network: MTV
- Release: March 13, 2012

Related
- My Super Psycho Sweet 16: Part 2

My Super Psycho Sweet 16: Part 3 (Note: Titled onscreen as My Super Psycho Sweet 16 3) is a 2012 American made-for-TV slasher film directed by Jacob Gentry. It is a sequel to My Super Psycho Sweet 16: Part 2 (2010) and the third and final installment in the film series of the same name. It follows Skye Rotter, who attends her half-sister's, Alex, sweet sixteen where another psychopath begins to murder their friends during the celebration.

The film premiered on March 13, 2012 on MTV and was released on DVD on May 29.

== Plot ==
Two years after surviving the massacre at BONEYARD Bar and kill her own father (Note: As depicted in My Super Psycho Sweet 16: Part 2 (2010)), Skye Rotter is moving out of her boyfriend, Brigg and his family's house to New York City for college with her new friend, the free spirited Sienna whom she met on Craigslist. As she is on the road, Skye receives a call from her estranged sister, Alex Bell, who Skye has not spoken to in the past two years. Alex is surprised that Skye wasn't going to tell her that she was leaving. She begs Skye to come see her at her grandparents' country house to say goodbye before she leaves. Initially, Skye refuses, but is convinced by Sienna to tie up all loose ends before moving on with her life. Upon arriving back in Mill Basin, Skye and Sienna are greeted by Nathan Stillo, a 22-year-old man who shows them the way to Alex's after getting lost. At Alex's grandparents' house (Bell Manor), Nathan is asked to immediately leave the estate by two of Alex's guests: Leo, Alex's love interest, and Nico, who is ready to have fun no matter what. Skye goes inside to find Alex. Alex reveals that today is actually her "Sweet 16".

Stunned and confused at Alex's actions, Skye almost leaves the party but decides to stay for a while longer when Alex becomes worried when she hears Nathan came along with them and unknowingly reveals her location to him. She then meets Ami, Alex's friend who tells Skye to lose the drama. Alex tells Skye in private that she wanted her over because it is a special day for her, and Skye is the only one who could ever understand what it is like to live with the stigma from being Charlie Rotter's daughter.

Brynn, a spoiled girl and Nico's girlfriend walks in on the two and is annoyed. As day turns into night, Alex tells Skye of how she met Nathan at Zoe's funeral. He later became obsessed with her, and is willing to do anything for her love and admiration. Nico, Leo, Ami and Brynn tell their perspective of Nathan as "South Basin trash". Sienna comes in to tell Skye that Nathan must have ditched the place. After trying to talk to Skye, she is forced to wait outside on the top of her car so that Alex can get more bonding time with Skye before they leave. Brynn is outside in the back trying to make a call.

When Nathan startles her, Brynn tells him that Alex will never love a freak like him. An angered Nathan chases her down with a knife before striking a lamp post to her skull, apparently killing her. Nathan tosses her body in the pool. At this time, Nico looks around one of the rooms in the house. Nathan threatens Nico with the use of speakers installed in the room and has the doors electronically locked on him. Nico shoots the door with a shotgun causing everyone to worry. He unlocks the door only to find a bloody piece of clothing of Brynn's and shows it to the others. Brynn, who crawled out of the pool with her brain severely damaged, walks around the house aimlessly till she crashes on a pool table, throws up blood on Ami, then dies from her wound.

Everyone goes inside the room only to have all the doors and windows locked by Nathan, who has complete control over the house as he watches them from one of many cameras installed in the house. A door near Ami opens and she runs for escape but before Skye and the others could get out, the door locks behind Ami. As she calls the cops, the police think she is making a prank call. She trips and her phone falls underneath a table.

While trying to reach it someone claiming to be the police knock on the front door. When she opens the door, the "cop" is revealed to be Nathan, who shoots her with a nail gun. In shock she runs off but is locked out of the living room where Skye, Alex, Nico and Leo are. Nathan then continues to shoot her with nails, pinning her against the door.

Meanwhile, Leo has unlocked another door upstairs. Alex and him run off for escape, leaving Skye and Nico to hunt them down. Skye gets separated from Nico when she heads into the theater room where she finds a mask resembling the one her father used. Nathan walks in and has a film playing all the events from Skye and Alex's life. He reveals that he has known about Charlie Rotter for a long time and admires his doings. He seeks to copycat him and do exactly what he did in his murder sprees; killing Skye's friend and taking her for himself. Skye calls her father sick for the things he has done, but Nathan expresses his beliefs that her father was a genius for murdering spoiled teenagers. She is sickened and is stalled as Nathan locks her in the room. Meanwhile, Alex and Leo reunite and find themselves being stalked by Nathan in the dark. Leo points a gun in that direction but before he can shoot, Alex unexpectedly pulls a knife out and kills him by slitting his throat.

Alex holds the knife close in defense as she sees a man in a mask walking out from the darkness to her. He pulls off the mask to her. Then he pulls her in and begins to romantically make out with her. As their lips part, Alex smiles. It is now revealed that Skye's little sister is the mastermind behind the horrors; Nathan is her accomplice. Later Nico, who is upstairs, jumps out of an opened window with a knife in hand. When he falls he is wounded by his own knife as Nathan comes out and kills him.

Sienna, who is now frustrated from waiting too long, finds Nathan hiding Nico's body. She gets help from him to start her car up, which has died out on her. As he has her checking under the hood, he continually slams the roof on her till she isn't moving any more, making Nathan believe she is dead. After telling her that this has nothing to do with her, Nathan goes back inside the house. Skye, who has managed to escape, has found a scythe in another room. She hears Alex scream and sees her crying over Leo's dead body. Skye tries to comfort her, but Alex, whose face is hidden from her, turns from sad to disgust at the mere touch of her sister.

Nathan shows up and Skye passes out when Alex (who is behind her) chloroforms her. Skye wakes up tied to a chair at a dinner table. The other seats are occupied with the bloody corpses of Brynn, Ami, Leo and Nico. Alex is on the lap of Nathan, kissing him. Skye asks what she is doing. Alex happily replies that she is celebrating her birthday. Alex then changes drastically and admits she is hurting on the inside, suffering from the death of her parents and blames her for leading Charlie to their demise. She then claims that no one would believe Alex as the killer as she just lost her parents and has great recommendations from her therapist, whom Alex had been playing the whole time.

Alex and Nathan go back to making out until Skye starts talking and plays on Nathan's emotions. She tells him that he should feel proud for succeeding in the event of getting both of the Rotter daughters in one room. She also tells him that Charlie never knew Alex had existed and would always want Skye to be protected. Realizing that these facts are accurate, he unties her. When Nathan refuses Alex's orders to stop, Alex grabs the scythe and kills Nathan by slitting his chest open. Alex charges for Skye. They duke it out and run outside.

After seeing an unconscious Sienna has made it to the gates, Skye is chased by Alex in her brand new car, and they head into a wooded area, which is too narrow for Alex to drive through. Alex gets out of the car and they fight it out till Skye uses pepper spray on Alex's face, then gets up and grabs the scythe. Alex taunts Skye to kill her, telling her she's just like their father. Skye strikes the scythe down to the ground, without killing her, then kicks her in the face, which knocks Alex out. Skye finds Sienna stumbling around, in desperate need of hospital attention. Skye sees that a police car has actually reacted to the call made earlier and drives around to check if things are well at the Bell estate. Skye is unable to get their attention in the foggy rain. Skye finds a flare in the trunk of Alex's nearby car and uses it. That still doesn't get their attention, so she sticks the flare in the gas tank, then runs for cover and shields Sienna. Skye walks off, victoriously, as the police have stopped to rescue them.

Time has passed since the party and Skye is looking through a window, where she sees Alex at a mental institution in a straitjacket. Skye tells her that she wishes to go back and prevent everything from ever happening, but knows that she can't. She goes on saying that everything that happened because of Charlie Rotter has to end with them and tells her that she will always be there for her because they are family and that she truly does love her. Alex, listening and bewildered with anger, immediately slams her face into the window in a failed attempt to attack Skye. Skye finally leaves her past behind as she heads out. Skye and Sienna are later seen at an art opening, showing off Skye's art, including one based on her and Alex, which displays the pain they went through together. Skye doesn't want to stay for the opening, as she feels that this gallery wasn't for them, but for her and her accomplishments. Outside she is surprised to see Brigg Jenner, who has come from his own college, where he finally tells her he loves her. They walk off together hand in hand as Skye is truly happy.

== Cast ==
- Lauren McKnight as Skye Rotter
- Kirsten Prout as Alex Bell
- Ryan Sypek as Nathan Stillo
- Jillian Rose Reed as Sienna Brooks
- Niko Pepaj as Nico Velli
- Ben Winchell as Leo Fincher
- Onira Tares as Ami Cyrus
- Autumn Dial as Brynn Stone
- Chris Zylka as Brigg Jenner (uncredited, cameo)
- Roy McCrerey as Mr. Jenner, Brigg's Dad
- Jacob Gentry as Professor

== Release ==
MTV aired My Super Psycho Sweet 16: Part 3 on March 13, 2012.

== Reception ==
Scott Foy of Dread Central rated it 2/5 stars and wrote: "This time I got the sense the real killer was MTV and the biggest slashing victim was the budget".
