= Thunder Road =

Thunder Road may refer to:

== Film ==
- Thunder Road (1958 film), a moonshine bootlegger crime film starring Robert Mitchum
- Thunder Road (2016 film), a short comedy-drama film by Jim Cummings
- Thunder Road (2018 film), a comedy-drama film directed by and starring Jim Cummings, based on his short of the same name.
- Thunder Road, a fictional spaceship in Explorers, 1985
- Thunder Road Films, a film and television production company

== Music ==
- "The Ballad of Thunder Road", a 1957 song co-written and performed by Robert Mitchum for the 1958 film
- "Thunder Road" (song), a 1975 song by Bruce Springsteen
- Thunder Road, a 1980s Canadian band led by David Thompson
- "Thunder Road", a 2001 song by Judas Priest from Point of Entry

== Sports and games ==
- Thunder Road (board game), a racing game published by Milton Bradley
- Thunder Road Handicap, an annual American Thoroughbred horse race at Santa Anita Park in Arcadia, California
- Thunder Road International SpeedBowl, a short-track speedway in Barre, Vermont
- Thunder Road Marathon, an annual marathon in Charlotte, North Carolina

== Other uses ==
- Thunder Road (roller coaster), a former wooden roller coaster at Carowinds in North and South Carolina
- Georgia State Route 9, used by moonshiners during Prohibition
- Georgia Highway 197, used by moonshiners during Prohibition
- Tennessee State Route 33, part of the route inspiring the moonshine song, "The Ballad of Thunder Road"
- Thunder Road, a former turbo-simulator ride at Dollywood in Pigeon Forge, Tennessee
- Thunder Road, the first original mobile comic, by Steven Sanders
- National Route 13 (Vietnam), a nickname given by US forces during the Vietnam War

== See also ==
- Thunder Alley (disambiguation)
