= The Screener =

2026 American television miniseries

- Genre: Comedy-drama; Legal drama
- Created by: Jim Cummings; PJ McCabe
- Written by: Jim Cummings; PJ McCabe
- Directed by: Jim Cummings; PJ McCabe
- Starring: Shereen Lani Younes; Jim Cummings; Jon Rudnitsky; B.K. Cannon; Boni Mata; Kumail Nanjiani
- Country of origin: United States
- Original language: English
- No. of episodes: 5

Production
- Producers: Michael J. McGarry; Thomas Cross
- Production companies: Cool & Happy Limited

The Screener is an upcoming American comedy-drama limited series created, written, and directed by Jim Cummings and PJ McCabe. Independently produced by Cool & Happy Limited, the five-episode series follows an indie filmmaker whose work leaks from a Hollywood talent agency, triggering a criminal investigation that escalates into a RICO prosecution. The series had its world premiere in the Episodic program at the 2026 Sundance Film Festival.

== Premise ==
Minnie (Shereen Lani Younes), a queer Muslim independent filmmaker, screens the explicit uncut version of her latest film for a talent agency in their private screening room. When the agency uploads the film to its internal server without her permission and it subsequently leaks online, she decides to press criminal charges. Los Angeles district attorney Tony Avaluto (Cummings) takes on the case, and his office pursues a RICO prosecution against the agency as a white-collar crime syndicate.

Each episode functions as a chapter in the investigation: the first depicts the leak from the agency's perspective, while subsequent episodes expand to the DA's office and the legal proceedings.

== Cast ==
- Shereen Lani Younes as Minnie, a queer Iranian independent filmmaker
- Jim Cummings as Tony Avaluto, the Los Angeles district attorney
- Jon Rudnitsky as an agent at IBG
- B.K. Cannon as Katherine, an assistant district attorney
- Boni Mata as Minnie's agent
- Shaun Brown as an assistant district attorney
- Bryan Casserly
- Nicolette Doke as an assistant at IBG
- Daryl Sabara as Derek Kahn
- Creed Bratton
- Kumail Nanjiani as Parker, a senior agent at IBG

== Production ==
=== Development ===
Cummings and McCabe, who have collaborated for approximately 20 years, were inspired by a pattern of real-life industry leaks. After a talent representative told them an anecdote about seeing the Coen brothers' No Country for Old Men months before its theatrical release, the pair became interested in what they describe as "screener culture", or the practice of using prerelease copies of films as social currency within Hollywood. Other reference points included the leak of Quentin Tarantino's The Hateful Eight screenplay, which an FBI investigation traced to a DVD screener, and the pre-release upload of X-Men Origins: Wolverine.

Cummings initially wrote the first 30 pages as a potential feature film before the pair decided the scope of the story was better suited to a series format. The duo co-wrote the scripts by workshopping dialogue aloud and performing scenes together, a method they described as essential to achieving naturalistic dialogue.

The project was a continuation of their interest in the internal workings of talent agencies, which they had previously explored in their 2021 film The Beta Test, set against the backdrop of the 2019 WGA packaging dispute.

=== Research ===
In preparation, Cummings and McCabe spent roughly two years interviewing current and former agents from major talent agencies, attorneys, court clerks, a former member of the Los Angeles District Attorney's office, FBI agents, and filmmakers who had been victims of leaks. They collected accounts of practices such as DVD ripping in agency mailrooms and unauthorized access to film festival submission platforms.

=== Filming ===
The series was independently produced through Cool & Happy Limited, outside the traditional studio system. Cummings and McCabe raised the budget in approximately five and a half months by tapping investors from their previous projects. The Screener features a mix of newcomers and industry veterans.

== Release ==
The Screener premiered at the 2026 Sundance Film Festival (January 22 to February 1, 2026) as part of the festival's Episodic program, with the first three episodes screening in person.

As of March 2026, the series does not have a distributor. Cummings and McCabe have been holding in-person buyers' screenings in New York and Los Angeles, consistent with the series' thematic concerns about digital distribution of unreleased content.

== Reception ==
Writing for The Cut, Michel Ghanem gave the series a positive review, calling it worthy of enthusiasm.The Hollywood Reporter's Mia Galuppo reported that the series generated significant word-of-mouth among industry attendees following its Sundance premiere, noting that entertainment lawyers, talent representatives, and other professionals continued discussing it in the weeks afterward.
