= Vanishing Angle =

American film production company

- Type: Limited liability company
- Industry: Film
- Founded: June 17, 2010
- Founders: Matt Miller; Erich Lochner
- Headquarters: Los Angeles, California, U.S.
- Key people: Matt Miller (President); Natalie Metzger (VP, Production & Development); Benjamin Wiessner (VP, Sales & Distribution)
- Services: Film production and distribution
- Website: vanishingangle.com

Vanishing Angle is an American independent film production and distribution company based in Los Angeles, California. It was founded in 2010 by Matt Miller and Erich Lochner.

The company produces independent narrative features, short films, documentaries, and digital series, and has self-distributed several of its releases. Its productions include the comedy-drama Thunder Road (2018), the comedy Greener Grass (2019), the horror comedy The Wolf of Snow Hollow (2020), the documentary It Ain't Over (2022), and the horror comedy Queens of the Dead (2025).

== History ==
Vanishing Angle was founded in 2010 by Matt Miller and Erich Lochner. Miller, who had worked as an assistant director and production assistant on both low-budget and studio films, built the company around a model that combined commercial and branded content work with independent feature development.

The company has produced short films as proofs of concept before expanding them into features, as it did with Thunder Road. It has also maintained ongoing working relationships with several directors, including Jim Cummings and Danny Madden, across multiple projects. Vanishing Angle also self-distributed several early releases, including Too Late (2015) and Thunder Road (2018), the latter with support from the Sundance Institute's Creative Distribution Initiative.

Natalie Metzger joined the company after meeting Miller at a film event in 2016 and later became a lead producer. In 2019, the company promoted three producers to executive roles: Metzger as Vice President of Development and Production, Benjamin Wiessner as Vice President of Sales and Acquisitions, and Jim Cummings as Vice President of Creative Initiatives. Matt Miller is the company's president.

Wiessner co-founded the company's Short to Feature Lab, a weeklong workshop in Malibu for developing short films into features, which he runs with Jim Cummings. In 2020, the company launched the Vanishing Angle Post Grant, awarding post-production services to short filmmakers in partnership with the post-production house DryDock.

== Filmography ==
=== Feature films ===
Year	Title	Director	Notes
2015	Too Late	Dennis Hauck	Self-distributed; shot on 35 mm in single-take scenes
2015	The Grief of Others	Patrick Wang	Premiered at the 2015 Cannes Film Festival
2015	Amira & Sam	Sean Mullin	
2015	The Dramatics: A Comedy	Scott Rodgers	
2017	American Folk	David Heinz	Premiered at the 2017 Santa Barbara International Film Festival
2018	Thunder Road	Jim Cummings	Won the Grand Jury Prize at SXSW 2018
2018	A Bread Factory	Patrick Wang	
2018	We the Coyotes	Hanna Ladoul, Marco La Via	Selected for the ACID sidebar at the 2018 Cannes Film Festival; also released as Anywhere With You
2019	Greener Grass	Jocelyn DeBoer, Dawn Luebbe	Premiered at the 2019 Sundance Film Festival; released by IFC Films
2020	Beast Beast	Danny Madden	Premiered at the 2020 Sundance Film Festival
2020	The Wolf of Snow Hollow	Jim Cummings	Released by Orion Classics
2020	In a Silent Way	Collin Levin	
2021	Werewolves Within	Josh Ruben	Premiered at the 2021 Tribeca Festival; released by IFC Films
2021	The Beta Test	Jim Cummings, PJ McCabe	Premiered at the 2021 Tribeca Festival; released by IFC Films
2022	It Ain't Over	Sean Mullin	Documentary on Yogi Berra; released by Sony Pictures Classics
2022	Disfluency	Anna Baumgarten	Directorial debut of Anna Baumgarten
2022	See You Then	Mari Walker	
2022	Spoonful of Sugar	Mercedes Bryce Morgan	Released as a Shudder original
2023	The Secret Art of Human Flight	H.P. Mendoza	Premiered at the 2023 Tribeca Festival; released by Level 33 Entertainment
2024	Cold Wallet	Cutter Hodierne	Premiered at SXSW 2024; released by Well Go USA
2025	Under the Lights	Miles Levin	Directorial debut of Miles Levin
2025	Queens of the Dead	Tina Romero	Premiered at the 2025 Tribeca Festival, where it won the Audience Award for Best Narrative Film; released by Independent Film Company and Shudder
2025	California King	Eli Stern	Feature directorial debut of Eli Stern
2025	Snake Oil Song	Micah Van Hove	Executive-produced by Vanishing Angle's Jim Cummings and Benjamin Wiessner; New York premiere at the 2026 Brooklyn Film Festival
2026	Downbeat	Danny Madden	Premiered at the 2026 SXSW Film Festival
2026	Kill Me	Peter Warren	Co-production with Dark Horse Entertainment and Rabbits Black; premiered at the 2026 SXSW Film Festival
TBA	The Edge of Normal	Carlota Pereda	Co-production with XYZ Films (lead producer and financier)

=== Television and digital series ===
Year	Title	Notes
2016	MatPat's Game Lab	Digital series; won a Streamy Award in 2016
2018	Stargate Origins	Ten-episode digital series for MGM's Stargate Command; Vanishing Angle served as co-producer. Later re-cut as the feature Stargate Origins: Catherine
2021	The Park	Dystopian drama series set up at Topic
2024	From the Top: Where Music Lives	Short-form video series produced in partnership with the NPR-distributed classical-music program From the Top

=== Selected short films ===
Year	Title	Director	Notes
	Minutes		Six-short comedy anthology produced for Fullscreen following the Thunder Road short's 2016 Sundance Grand Jury Prize win
	Still Life		Three-short series produced for Topic following the Thunder Road short's 2016 Sundance Grand Jury Prize win
2023	POOF	Margaret Miller	Official Selection, 2023 Cannes Film Festival Short Film Competition; nominated for the Short Film Palme d'Or
2023	Shadow Brother Sunday	Alden Ehrenreich	Directorial debut of Ehrenreich; premiered at the 2023 Tribeca Festival
