= Lauren Adams =

Lauren Adams may refer to:

- Lauren Adams (character), a character from the CHERUB series
- Lauren Adams (actress) (born 1982), American actress
- Joey Lauren Adams (born 1968), American actress and director
