= The Wolf of Snow Hollow =

- Release poster
- Directed by: Jim Cummings
- Written by: Jim Cummings
- Produced by: Kathleen Grace; Matt Hoklotubbe; Michael J. McGarry; Natalie Metzger; Matt Miller; Benjamin Wiessner
- Starring: Jim Cummings; Riki Lindhome; Chloe East; Jimmy Tatro; Robert Forster
- Cinematography: Natalie Kingston
- Edited by: Patrick Nelson Barnes; R. Brett Thomas
- Music by: Ben Lovett
- Production companies: New Form; Vanishing Angle; XYZ Films
- Distributed by: Orion Classics (through United Artists Releasing)
- Release date: October 9, 2020
- Running time: 84 minutes
- Country: United States
- Language: English
- Budget: $2 million
- Box office: $266,963

The Wolf of Snow Hollow is a 2020 American comedy horror mystery film written and directed by Jim Cummings. It is about a small Utah town that is seemingly terrorized by a werewolf. Cummings also stars along with Riki Lindhome, Chloe East, Jimmy Tatro, and Robert Forster. The film is dedicated to Forster, as it was the last of his career, completed shortly before his death.

It was released in limited theaters and on VOD in the United States on October 9, 2020, by United Artists Releasing.

== Plot ==
PJ Palfrey and his girlfriend Brianne vacation in Snow Hollow, Utah, where PJ gets into a verbal altercation with two hunters. At their rental house that night, Brianne is attacked. PJ discovers her mangled body and a paw print in the snow.

John Marshall, a deputy sheriff struggling with alcoholism, is called to the murder scene. Brianne's genitalia and other parts are missing from her corpse.

Snowboarding instructor Hannah Marten is killed next, in a struggle in which her head and an arm are torn off. Wolf fur is on her body. John gets into a fight with an officer who leaks to the press that the killer could be a wolf. Under stress, John begins drinking again.

While John and officer Julia Robson drive to work the next morning, someone throws a beer bottle at her car. Paranoid tips from all over the community roll in. Townie Liz Fairchild has a strange encounter with a tall man at a diner and reports it to the police. John's father, Sheriff Hadley, is diagnosed with a heart murmur. John urges him to seek medical treatment and work from home. Hadley refuses to go for treatment. Later that night, Liz and her three-year-old are killed.

John combs through the town's records to determine if there is a connection between the victims and looks up werewolf lore. While investigating, they discover the tall man called Liz's workplace asking for her. A curfew is imposed, and an active watch for the creature begins. After another cardiac event, Hadley agrees to retire and seek treatment.

At night, Jenna sneaks away to see her boyfriend. They are attacked in his SUV by the wolfman, wounding Jenna. John answers a neighbor's 911 call and shoots at the creature, which escapes. It later kills a sheriff's deputy, stuffing his body in a trash can. When John yells at Jenna for breaking curfew, she shouts that his lack of care is the reason why she is going away to college on a gymnastics scholarship. After visiting her and Hadley in the hospital, John breaks into Jenna's boyfriend's house and attacks him. Meanwhile, Hadley dies from heart complications.

Grieving for Hadley and frustrated with the case, John is banned from his support group meetings at Alcoholics Anonymous. The body of a man living in a camper outside town is found dead of a heroin overdose and the police believe that he is the killer due to his height, his knife collection, the presence of a pet wolf-dog, and the discovery of the body of a missing woman in his backyard. The coroner later threatens to tell the press about his ineptitude in finding the murderer. John deduces that the coroner was responsible for the vandalism of Robson's car and fires him.

While John is out distributing evidence from the closed case back to its original owners, PJ contacts Robson, saying he found a seam ripper, which he claims is not his. Realizing the tool PJ found is for taxidermy, Robson realizes that local taxidermist Paul Carnury is the killer. Meanwhile, John stops by Paul's house to drop off items which were previously confiscated as evidence by the sheriff's office. Paul is very cordial and welcoming and invites John inside. Paul asks details about the case and John asks Paul the whereabouts of his wife. Paul denies being married even though John recalls Paul mentioning having a wife several times before. John excuses himself and leaves Paul's residence and realizes immediately something about what Paul had said was off and returns. At the front door, John tells Paul something he had said bothered him and asks Paul to stand up to his full height, with Paul revealing himself to be nearly 7 feet tall. Paul slams the door on John and hastily flees inside his home. John calls for backup and breaks into the house, discovering Hannah's missing severed head wrapped in clear plastic. Paul stabs John in the stomach and lifts him off the ground. Hearing nearby sirens, Paul drops John, and then changes into a homemade wolf pelt suit and runs into the woods. Wounded and bleeding, John pursues Paul, a short scuffle occurs between the two until Paul is distracted by overhead fireworks and is shot and incapacitated by officer Robson. John shoots Paul repeatedly in the head before collapsing in the snow.

Robson later becomes Snow Hollow's new sheriff. She and John help Jenna move into her college dorm. John leaves Jenna condoms and by the look of shock on her face, possibly a gun or other weapon for self-defense. As he walks out of the dorm, he passes two students making sexual comments about the gymnasts in the dorm. He stops for a moment but then just walks away.

== Cast ==
- Jim Cummings as John Marshall, the deputy sheriff of Snow Hollow who struggles with alcoholism and anger issues
- Riki Lindhome as Detective Julia Robson, a police officer who is investigating the murders alongside John
- Chloe East as Jenna Marshall, John's daughter
- Jimmy Tatro as PJ Palfrey, a man whose girlfriend was killed by the Wolf
- Robert Forster as Sheriff Hadley, John's father and the sheriff of Snow Hollow
- Will Madden as Paul Carnury, a taxidermist
- Annie Hamilton as Brianne, PJ's girlfriend

== Production ==
Filming took place in Kamas, Utah in March 2019. Producer Matt Miller had known Robert Forster from a previous project, and sent the script to his agent. Director Jim Cummings said he "expected a polite 'no,'" but Forster chose to take the role because he viewed it as "a dramatic movie about a father-son relationship, and complications of aging and health."

== Release ==
In September 2020, Orion Classics acquired distribution rights to the film.

The film had a limited theatrical release in the United States on October 9, 2020 by United Artists Releasing and on video-on-demand the same day.

== Reception ==
=== Box office ===
On its opening weekend the film grossed $91,943 from 112 theaters.

=== Critical response ===
On review aggregator Rotten Tomatoes the film holds an approval rating of 89% based on 74 reviews, with an average rating of 7.3/10. The website's critics' consensus reads: "The Wolf of Snow Hollow treads somewhat unsteadily between horror and comedy, but writer-director-star Jim Cummings' unique sensibilities make for an oddly haunting hybrid." Metacritic, which uses a weighted average, assigned the film a score of 67 out of 100, based on 13 critics, indicating "generally favorable" reviews.

John DeFore of The Hollywood Reporter gave the film a positive review and wrote, "Satisfying enough as a horror/slasher flick with a black-comedy aftertaste, it has some commercial appeal but doesn't represent a step forward artistically." Brian Tallerico of RogerEbert.com awarded the film three-and-a-half out of four stars and wrote: "The snow-covered setting and bumbling cops, along with Cummings' deadpan sense of humor, have led to comparisons to the Coen brothers and there is a sense of 'Fargo meets Silver Bullet' in some of The Wolf of Snow Hollow, but it’s not like Cummings wears his influences as obviously as some genre filmmakers."

Peter Debruge of Variety wrote: "Wolf actually does that thing we all hope second features won't: It reveals that idiosyncrasies of an unproven director's debut weren't quirks so much as weaknesses — a disappointment for those of us hoping lightning might strike twice for the Thunder Road helmer."

Grant Hermanns of Comingsoon.net gave the film a 9.5 out of 10. Chuck Bowen of Slant Magazine awarded the film three stars out of four. Ignatiy Vishnevetsky of The A.V. Club graded the film a B. Don Kaye of Den of Geek awarded the film two and a half stars out of five. Meagan Navarro of Bloody Disgusting awarded the film three skulls out of five. JimmyO of JoBlo.com gave the film a 9 out of 10.
