= Michael Cumpsty =

English actor

- Born: Wakefield, England
- Occupation: Actor
- Years active: 1989–present
- Partner: John Dias

Michael Cumpsty is an English actor. He is known for his work in Broadway plays such as Artist Descending a Staircase (1989), Racing Demon (1995), Copenhagen (2000), Democracy (2004), and Machinal (2014).

Cumpsty's film work includes State of Grace (1990), The Ice Storm (1997), Flags of Our Fathers (2006), and The Visitor (2007). He has also appeared in television series such as Nurse Jackie, L.A. Law, Boardwalk Empire, The Knick, Tommy, Severance, and Barry.

Cumpsty has also appeared in musicals such as 1776 (1997), 42nd Street (2001), Sunday in the Park with George (2008), and End of the Rainbow (2012). He received a Tony Award for Best Featured Actor in a Play nomination for his role in the latter.

== Early life and education ==
Cumpsty was born and raised in Wakefield, and moved to South Africa with his family at the age of nine. He later returned to England and attended Haileybury College in Hertford Heath, before relocating to the U.S. and receiving a BA in English from the University of North Carolina at Chapel Hill in 1982.

== Career ==
Cumpsty made his Broadway debut in Artist Descending a Staircase (1989). He has appeared in Broadway dramas such as La Bête (1991), Timon of Athens (1993), The Heiress (1995), Copenhagen (2000), and The Constant Wife (2005). He appeared on Broadway in the play End of the Rainbow in 2012 and received a Tony Award nomination for Featured Actor for his performance. He appeared in the Los Angeles production of the play, which ran in March and April 2013 at the Ahmanson Theatre. He appeared in the Roundabout Theatre production of Machinal as the "husband" from December 2013 to 2 March 2014.

In Broadway stage musicals, he played John Dickinson in the revival of 1776 (1997), and Julian Marsh in the revival of 42nd Street (2001). He played the role of Jules in the revival of Sunday in the Park With George in 2008. In off-Broadway work, he co-directed a Classic Stage Company production of Richard III in 2007, as well as played the title role. Other Shakespeare roles include the title role in Timon of Athens in 1996, Parolles in All's Well That Ends Well in 1993, Laertes in Hamlet in 1990, Time/Lord in The Winter's Tale in 1989, and Escalus in Romeo and Juliet in 1988, all at the Public Theater. He played the title role in the Classic Stage Company production of Hamlet in 2005, winning the Obie Award.

Cumpsty's television credits include daytime soap operas such as One Life to Live and All My Children, recurring roles on the primetime dramas L.A. Law in 1991 as "killer litigator" Frank Kittridge, Severance as Security Chief Doug Graner, and Star Trek: Voyager as the holographic Lord Burleigh, and guest appearances on Matlock, The OA, and Law & Order. Cumpsty's feature films include State of Grace (1990), Fatal Instinct (1993), The Ice Storm (1997), Starting Out in the Evening (2007), The Visitor (2007) and Eat Pray Love (2010)

Cumpsty appeared at the Two River Theater in Much Ado About Nothing in October 2011, in Present Laughter in 2013, and directed the Wendy Wasserstein play Third in 2014. He appeared in Absurd Person Singular as "Ronald" in January and on 1 February 2015. He said of the Two River Theater: "It's similar to off-Broadway, but at a much nicer theater. And it's different from Broadway because it's not commercial so there's less pressure. It's exhilarating, too. The run is short (three or four weeks) then it's gone. It's kind of special..." He further said that he likes "language oriented work" and mentioned as examples Copenhagen and the plays of Tom Stoppard.

In 2023 he acted in the HBO drama series Barry playing the Movie Gene Cousineau in the episode "wow" alongside Jim Cummings as Movie Barry Berkman; Henry Winkler and Bill Hader originated the roles respectively.

== Personal life ==
Cumpsty has lived in New Jersey with his boyfriend John Dias, artistic director of the Two River Theater Company in Red Bank, since 2010.

== Filmography ==
=== Films ===
Year	Title	Role	Notes
1990	State of Grace	Frankie's Man	
1993	Fatal Instinct	Laura's Husband	
1997	The Ice Storm	Philip Edwards	
1999	The 24 Hour Woman	Suzanne Pincus' Publicist	
2006	The Ex	Jack Connor	
2006	Flags of Our Fathers	Secretary Forrestal	
2007	The Visitor	Charles	
2007	Starting Out in the Evening	Victor	
2010	Eat Pray Love	Swami Dhavalachandra	
2010	Wall Street: Money Never Sleeps	Churchill Schwartz Partner	
2011	Downtown Express	Vadim	
2013	Burning Blue	Admiral Stephensen	
2014	Seduction Theory	The Father	(Short)
2016	Collateral Beauty	Chairman of the Board	

=== Television ===
Year	Title	Role	Notes
1989	One Life to Live	Sebastian	1 Episode
1990	The Kennedys of Massachusetts	Billy Hartington	3 Episodes
1990	Great Performances	Laertes	Episode: "Hamlet"
1991-1992	L.A. Law	Frank Kittredge	17 episodes
1992-1993	Bob	Mr. Terhorst	Voice; 7 episodes
1993	Crossroads	Bailey	Episode: "The Harvest"
1995	Star Trek: Voyager	Lord Burleigh	2 episodes: "Cathexis" and "Persistence of Vision"
1995	Matlock	Cameron Ivers	Episode: "The Scam"
1995	Pointman	Det. Gordon Hagarty	Episode: "Models"
1996	Mistrial	Terry Lynch	Television movie
1997	Night Sins	Dr. Garrett Wright	Television movie
1999	Law & Order	Tom Willis	Episode: "Hate"
1999	The Lady in Question	Klaus Gruber	Television movie
2001	The Lullaby of Broadway: Opening Night on 42nd Street	Julian Marsh	Television movie
2004	All My Children	Alan Singer	5 episodes
2007-2011	Law & Order: Criminal Intent	Mark Schaeffer; Bing Cullman aka Arnold Binder	"Rocket Man" (2007) "Trophy Wine" (2011)
2007-2010	American Experience	James Callender; Prosecutor Roger Robb; John Randolph	"Alexander Hamilton" (2007) "The Trials of J. Robert Oppenheimer" (2009) "Dolley Madison" (2010)
2009	Mercy	Father Gus	Episode: "Hope You're Good, Smiley Face "
2011	Nurse Jackie	Lou Babiak	2 episodes: "Mitten" and "Rat Falls"
2011-2012	Boardwalk Empire	Father Brennan	6 episodes
2012	Made in Jersey	Barry Gilchrist	Episode: "The Farm"
2014	The Good Wife	Eric Napier	Episode: "Shiny Objects"
2015	The Knick	Judge Parkinson Bothamly	2 episodes
2015	Madam Secretary	Max Quinn	Episode: "Spartan Figures"
2015	Elementary	Arlen Schrader	Episode: "When Your Number's Up"
2016	The OA	Dr. Leon Citro	Episode: "Forking Paths"
2016	Red Oaks	Priest	Episode: "Old Flames"
2017	The Blacklist: Redemption	Robert Wilmont	Episode: "Kevin Jensen"
2019	The Enemy Within	Dennis Gordon	Episode: "The Ambassador's Wife"
2020	Tommy	Lovell	3 episodes
2022	Severance	Mr. Graner	7 episodes
2023	Barry	Movie Gene Cousineau	Episode: "wow"
2025	The Gilded Age	Lord Mildmay	2 episodes

=== Theatre ===
Year	Title	Role	Playwright	Venue
1989	Artist Descending a Staircase	Young Beauchamp	Tom Stoppard	Helen Hayes Theatre, Broadway debut
1991	La Bête	Elomire	David Hirson	Eugene O'Neill Theatre, Broadway
1993	Timon of Athens	Alcibiades	William Shakespeare	Lyceum Theatre, Broadway
1995	The Heiress	Morris Townsend	Ruth and Augustus Goetz	Cort Theatre, Broadway
1995	Translations	Lt. Yolland	Brian Friel	Plymouth Theatre, Broadway
1995	Racing Demon	Rev. Tony Ferris	David Hare	Vivian Beaumont Theatre, Broadway
1997	1776	John Dickinson	Sherman Edwards / Peter Stone	Criterion Theatre, Broadway
1998	Electra	Orestes	Frank McGuinness	Ethel Barrymore Theatre, Broadway
2000	Copenhagen	Werner Heisenberg	Michael Frayn	Royale Theatre, Broadway
2001	42nd Street	Julian Marsh	Harry Warren / Al Dubin	Ford Center for the Performing Arts, Broadway
2003	Enchanted April	Mellersh Wilton	Matthew Barber	Belasco Theatre, Broadway
2004	Democracy	Arno Kretschmann	Michael Frayn	Brooks Atkinson Theatre, Broadway
2005	The Constant Wife	John Middleton	W. Somerset Maugham	American Airlines Theatre, Broadway
2008	Sunday in the Park with George	Bob Greenberg	Stephen Sondheim	Studio 54, Broadway
2012	End of the Rainbow	Anthony	Peter Quilter	Belasco Theatre, Broadway
2013	The Winslow Boy	Desmond Curry	Terence Rattigan	American Airlines Theatre, Broadway
2014	Machinal	Husband	Sophie Treadwell	American Airlines Theatre, Broadway

== Accolades ==
Year	Association	Category	Project	Result
2001	Outer Critics Circle Award	Outstanding Actor in a Musical	42nd Street	Nominated
2003	Outer Critics Circle Award	Outstanding Featured Actor in a Play	Enchanted April	Nominated
2012	Tony Award	Best Featured Actor in a Play	End of the Rainbow	Nominated
2023	Screen Actors Guild Award	Outstanding Ensemble in a Drama Series	Severance	Nominated
