= Riki Lindhome =

American actress and comedian

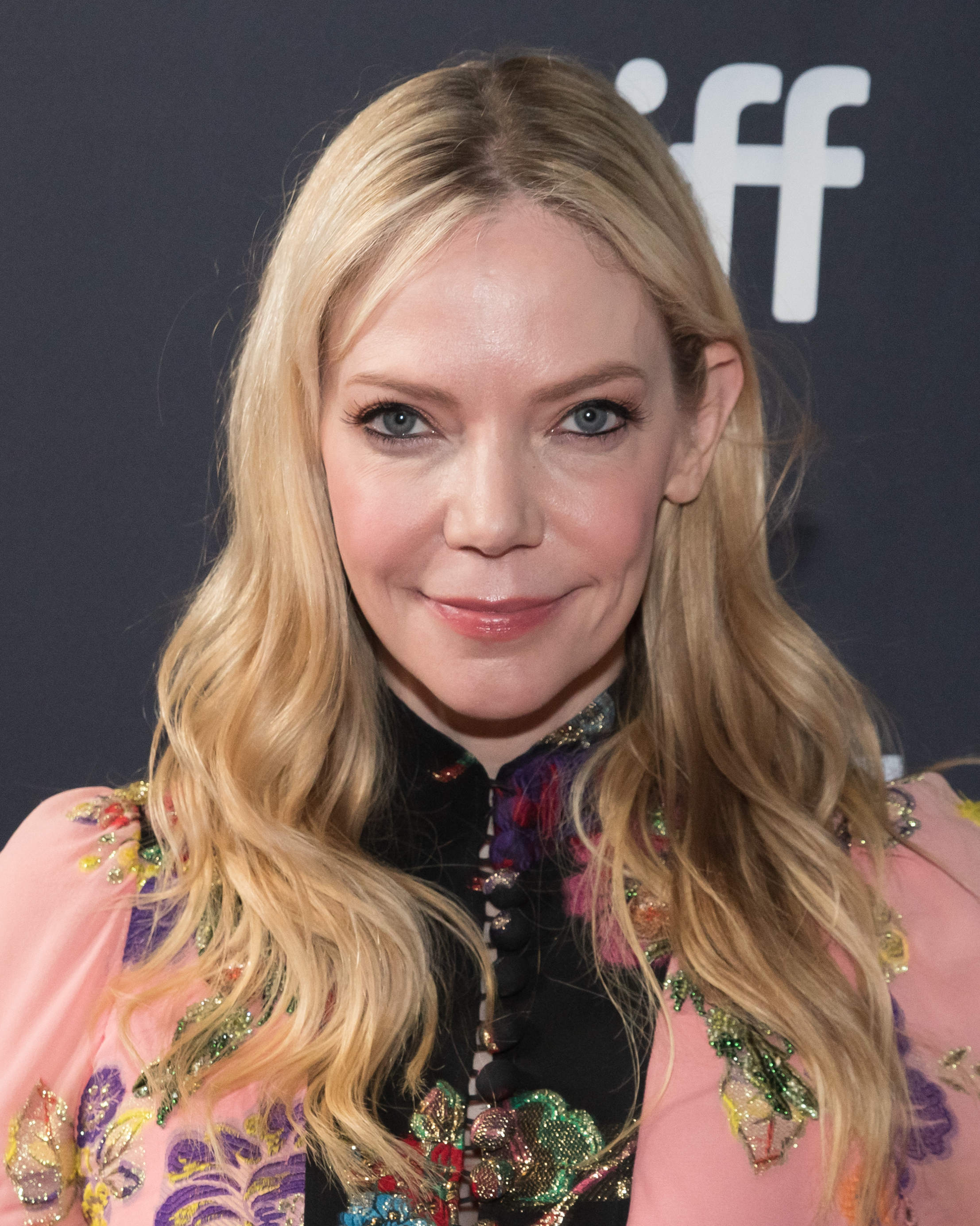
- Lindhome in 2025
- Born: Erika Lindhome; 1978 or 1979 (age 46–47); Coudersport, Pennsylvania, U.S.
- Other name: Garfunkel
- Education: Syracuse University
- Occupations: Actress; comedian; musician
- Years active: 2001–present
- Spouse: Fred Armisen (m. 2022)
- Children: 1
- Musical career
- Genres: Folk; comedy
- Instruments: Vocals; guitar; flute
- Member of: Garfunkel and Oates
- Website: rikilindhome.com

Erika "Riki" Lindhome (born 1978 or 1979) is an American actress, comedian and musician. She serves as a singer and songwriter for the comedy folk duo Garfunkel and Oates with Kate Micucci.

After making her television debut in 2002 with minor roles in the series Titus and Buffy the Vampire Slayer, Lindhome guest-starred on the WB series Gilmore Girls (2005–2006), the CBS sitcom The Big Bang Theory (2008; 2017) and the HBO series Enlightened (2011). She co-created and starred in the Comedy Central period sitcom Another Period (2015–2018) with Natasha Leggero. She voiced the recurring role of Kimberly Harris in the Fox animated sitcom series Duncanville (2020–2022), and in 2022 she starred as Dr. Valerie Kinbott in the Netflix comedy horror series Wednesday.

Lindhome made her feature film debut in the 2004 film Million Dollar Baby as Mardell Fitzgerald, and went on to star in the comedy horror films Hell Baby (2013) and The Wolf of Snow Hollow (2020). In 2007, she formed Garfunkel and Oates with actress Kate Micucci. They wrote, produced and starred in an eponymous television series on IFC, which aired for one season in 2014. Their 2016 Vimeo comedy special Garfunkel and Oates: Trying to Be Special was nominated for a Primetime Emmy Award for Outstanding Original Music and Lyrics.

== Early life ==
Erika Lindhome is a native of Coudersport, Pennsylvania, and raised in Portville, New York. She is primarily of Swedish and Norwegian ancestry. Lindhome graduated from Portville High School in 1997. She majored in communications and film at Syracuse University, where she graduated in 2000.

In 1997, Lindhome won first prize in the JFK Profiles in Courage essay contest awarded by the John F. Kennedy Library in Boston. Her subject was United States Representative Carolyn McCarthy (D-NY), whose outrage at the murder of her husband during the 1993 Long Island Rail Road shooting compelled her to challenge and win the seat held by her congressman, who had voted to repeal the Federal Assault Weapons Ban.

== Career ==
=== Acting ===
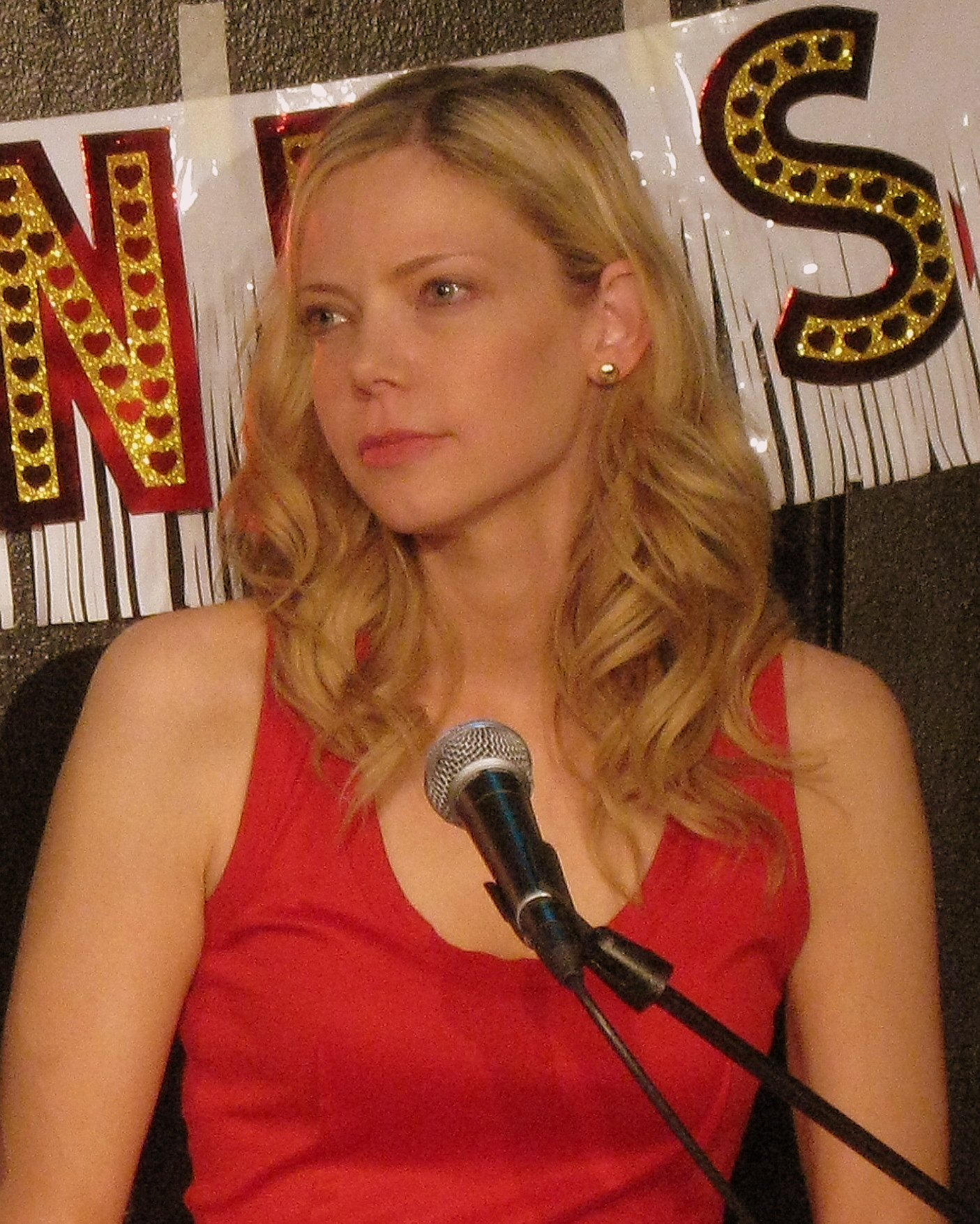
Lindhome in February 2010

Without an agent, Lindhome started her acting career with a role in a short film Backseat Detour (as a backseat passenger), and as Charlie in the sitcom Titus. In a season seven episode of the TV series Buffy the Vampire Slayer she was the crutches-using student Cheryl in 2002. In 2003, she joined The Actors' Gang and appeared in the play Embedded in two roles (a commedia dell'arte of Condoleezza Rice, and a reporter) and was one of four actors from the play to be cast in the 2004 Academy Award-winning film Million Dollar Baby, where she played Mardell Fitzgerald, the trailer-living sister of Maggie, the film's lead.

Lindhome briefly appeared as a nameless inquisitive student in a season three episode of the television series Gilmore Girls in 2002 before later guest-starring as calorie-counter Juliet on the show's fifth and sixth seasons. She also appeared as Janelle in the 2006 techno-horror film Pulse and as a cruel nurse in the 2008 crime drama film Changeling. She guest-starred on the television series The Big Bang Theory as Ramona Nowitzki, a controlling graduate student obsessed with Sheldon Cooper, in seasons two, ten and eleven (2008, 2017). She guest-starred in the television series Pushing Daisies as the pie-loving Jeanine. In 2008, she played Hilary, a devout Christian girl who has a purposely disastrous date with Dane Cook in My Best Friend's Girl; and had a minor role as murder victim Vanessa Holden on the crime drama series Criminal Minds. In 2009, she starred as the vicious, amoral Sadie in The Last House on the Left, a remake of the 1972 horror film of the same name.

In 2011, Lindhome was featured alongside Heather Morris, Sofía Vergara and Ashley Lendzion in "Nuthin' But a Glee Thang", a Glee-themed Funny or Die parody of the Dr. Dre song "Nuthin' but a 'G' Thang". From 2010 to 2013, she developed and hosted the Nerdist podcast Making It with Riki Lindhome, interviewing people in the entertainment industry about their rise to fame. From 2011 to 2013, she guest-starred as Harper on the HBO television series Enlightened. She played a female version of Conrade, one of Don John's followers with whom he has a steamy relationship in Joss Whedon's Much Ado About Nothing, and appeared as the "Galaxy Scout" costume-wearing Denise in the 2012 comedy film Fun Size. In 2013, she starred in the horror-comedy film Hell Baby as Marjorie, the protagonist's Wiccan sister, a role for which she did a full frontal nude scene that attracted attention for being unusually lengthy.

In 2015, Lindhome and Natasha Leggero created the Comedy Central series Another Period, in which Lindhome also starred as Beatrice Bellacourt. The show, which focuses on the Bellacourts, a fictional aristocratic family living in Newport, Rhode Island at the turn of the 20th century, premiered in June 2015. She had a recurring role on the television series The Muppets in 2015 as Becky, Fozzie Bear's human girlfriend. Also in 2015, she appeared in a season two episode of Fresh Off the Boat as Arielle, a resort masseuse, and Agneta, a Swedish Detective in Brooklyn Nine-Nine's season three episode "The Swedes". She voiced Poison Ivy in the 2017 animated film The Lego Batman Movie.

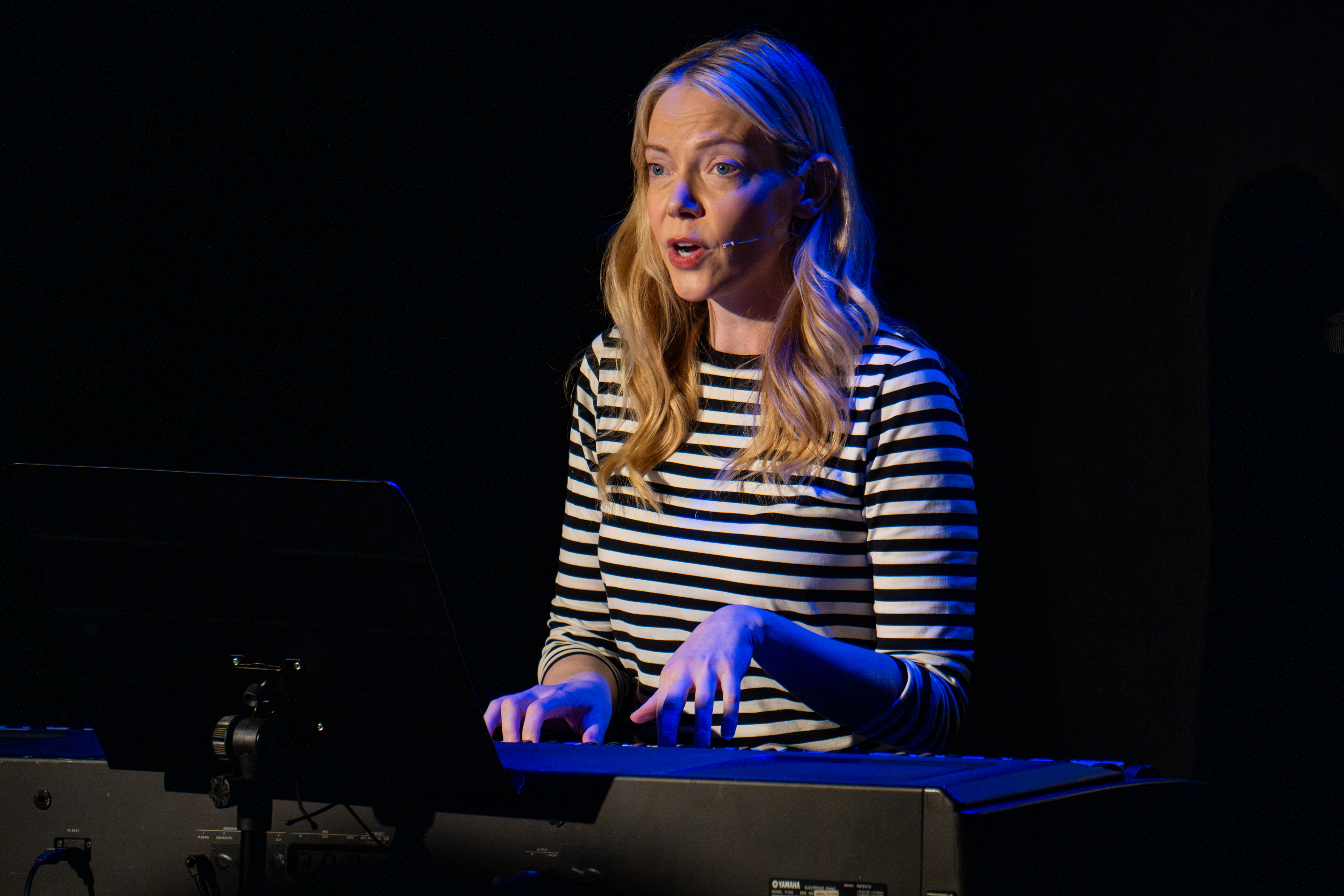
Riki Lindhome at the 2024 Edinburgh Festival Fringe in Edinburgh, Scotland

In 2018, Lindhome guest-starred as Shaina, a recovering drug addict, in an episode of the comedy-drama television series Kidding., and later in 2018, Lindhome played "The Actress" who has casual sex with the "aimless" Sam in the neo-noir black comedy Under the Silver Lake. In October 2019, she was featured in SoulPancake's short documentary film Laughing Matters. The next month, she appeared in the ensemble cast of the 2019 mystery film Knives Out as faithful wife Donna Thrombey. She began starring in the Fox animated sitcom series Duncanville in February 2020, voicing the character Kimberly Harris, the emotional 12-year-old sister of the protagonist, Duncan Harris. In October 2020, she starred in the comedy thriller film The Wolf of Snow Hollow, directed by Jim Cummings, as sympathetic yet professional local police officer Julia Robson.

In 2022, she voiced Royal Assistant Beep Beep in the Warner Brothers animated comedy film King Tweety, and starred as Dr. Valerie Kinbott, Wednesday Addams's strict but understanding court-ordered therapist, in the Netflix comedy horror series Wednesday.

In 2023, she guest-starred as Justine the Belieber, a fan of Justin Bieber who steals Dr. Teeth's van in Disney's The Muppets Mayhem.

In 2024, she appeared as Maud in the horror film Afraid.

=== Music ===
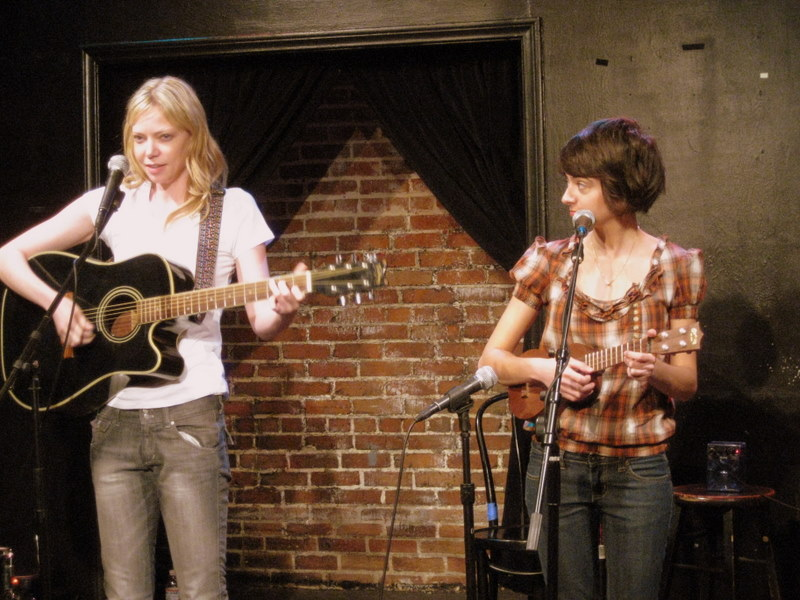
Lindhome performing as Garfunkel and Oates with Kate Micucci in 2009

Lindhome performs as "Garfunkel" in the comedy-folk duo Garfunkel and Oates, with her friend and fellow songwriter Kate Micucci.

=== Other work ===
As of November 2021, Lindhome was set to write the script for the upcoming animated musical film Steps; she would also executive-produce, and would co-write the lyrics with Micucci.

In August 2024, Lindhome premiered a one-woman musical called "Dead Inside" at the Edinburgh Festival Fringe. She brought the musical to the US and in July 2025 performed it at the Woolly Mammoth Theatre Company in Washington, DC.

== Personal life ==
Lindhome has a son, who was born via surrogate in March 2022; she is unable to give birth due to silent endometriosis. She has been married to Fred Armisen since June 1, 2022.

== Filmography ==
=== Film ===
Year	Title	Role	Notes
2001	Backseat Detour	Catie	Short film
2004	Seeing Other People	Girl Kissing Ed	Uncredited
2004	Million Dollar Baby	Mardell Fitzgerald	
2005	All In	Marsha	
2005	Embedded	Gondola / Journalist	Video
2005	Berkeley	Fighting Girl	
2006	Pulse	Janelle	
2006	Life is Short	Lilly	Short film
2008	Wednesday Again	Carli	
2008	Changeling	Examination Nurse	
2008	My Best Friend's Girl	Hilary	
2009	The Last House on the Left	Sadie	
2009	Powder Blue	Nicole	
2009	Say Hello to Stan Talmadge	Polly Talmadge	
2009	Imaginary Larry	Betsy	Short film
2011	A Good Funeral	Polly	
2012	Much Ado About Nothing	Conrade	
2012	Fun Size	Denise / Galaxy Scout	
2013	Hell Baby	Marjorie	
2014	Search Party	Singer at Weddings	
2015	The SpongeBob Movie: Sponge Out of Water	Popsicle	Voice
2016	Nerdland	Linda	Voice
2017	The Lego Batman Movie	Poison Ivy	Voice
2017	Movie Sound Effects: How Do They Do That?	Poison Ivy	Voice, short film
2018	Under the Silver Lake	The Actress	
2019	Knives Out	Donna Thrombey	
2020	The Wolf of Snow Hollow	Julia Robson	
2022	King Tweety	Royal Assistant Beep Beep	Voice
2023	Candy Cane Lane	Suz	
2024	Afraid	Maud	
2025	Queens of the Dead	Lizzy	
2025	The Napa Boys	Monica	
2025	The Hand That Rocks the Cradle	Bethany	
2026	Stop! That! Train!	Reporter 2	

=== Television ===
Year	Title	Role	Notes
2002	Titus	Charlie	Episode "Errrr"
2002	Buffy the Vampire Slayer	Cheryl	Episode: "Him"
2002–2006	Gilmore Girls	Girl #2 / Juliet	5 episodes
2006	Heroes	Car Rental Girl	Episode: "Chapter Three: 'One Giant Leap'"
2007	The Minister of Divine	Sally	Episode: "Pilot"
2007	Raines	Tammy	Episode: "Reconstructing Alice"
2008	Pushing Daisies	Jeanine	Episode: "Dummy"
2008	Criminal Minds	Vanessa Holden	Episode: "52 Pickup"
2008; 2017	The Big Bang Theory	Ramona Nowitzki	3 episodes
2009	Bones	Mandy Summers	Episode: "The Bond in the Boot"
2009	Three Rivers	Beth	Episode: "The Kindness of Strangers"
2009	Nip/Tuck	McKenzie	Episode: "Willow Banks"
2010	House	Sarah	Episode: "Lockdown"
2010	Drop Dead Diva	Marjorie Little	Episode: "Begin Again"
2011	$#*! My Dad Says	Laura Griffin	Episode: "Who's Your Daddy?"
2011	United States of Tara	Daisy	Episode: "Dr. Hatteras' Miracle Elixir"
2011	Traffic Light	Amy	Episode: "Credit Balance"
2011	Happy Endings	Angie	Episode: "The Code War"
2011	Enlightened	Harper	5 episodes
2012	Sketchy	Female Announcer	Episode: "Junk Pump"
2012	Staged	Ryda	Episode: "Flo Rida"
2013	King of the Nerds	Herself	Episode: "Nerdy Dancing"
2013	House of Lies: Flight Club	Melanie	Episode: "Rom Com"
2013	New Girl	Kylie	Episode: "The Captain"
2013–2014	Super Fun Night	Hayley	3 episodes
2013–2014	Monsters vs. Aliens	Susan Murphy / Ginormica, various voices	Voice, main role
2013; 2015	Adventure Time	Island Lady, Ice Cream, John	Voice, 2 episodes
2014	Garfunkel and Oates	Garfunkel	8 episodes; also creator, executive producer, writer
2014–2017	@midnight	Herself	5 episodes
2015	The Muppets	Becky	4 episodes
2015	Fresh Off the Boat	Arielle	Episode: "Family Business Trip"
2015	Brooklyn Nine-Nine	Agneta Carlsson	Episode: "The Swedes"
2015–2018	Another Period	Beatrice Bellacourt	32 episodes; also creator, executive producer, writer
2016	House of Lies	Joy	Episode: "One-Eighty"
2016	Ask the StoryBots	Oxygen Molecule	Episode: "Why Is the Sky Blue?"
2017	Difficult People	Hostess	Episode: "The Silkwood"
2018	Modern Family	Poet	Episode: "In Your Head"
2018	Take My Wife	Clerk	Episode #2.8
2018	Kidding	Shaina	Episode: "Every Pain Needs a Name"
2018–2020	Big Hero 6: The Series	Wendy Wower	Voice, 4 episodes
2019	Crazy Ex-Girlfriend	Hungry Cat	Episode: "I Need Some Balance"
2020	The Neighborhood	Kristen	Episode: "Welcome to the Jump"
2020	Big City Greens	Gina	Voice, episode: "Desserted"
2020	Law & Order: Special Victims Unit	Irena Nowak	Episode: "Ballad of Dwight and Irena"
2020–2022	Duncanville	Kimberly Harris	Voice; main role
2021	DuckTales	May	Voice, episode: "The Last Adventure!"
2021	United States of Al	Chloe	Episode: "Car/Motar"
2021	Just Beyond	Bonnie	Episode: "Parents Are from Mars, Kids Are from Venus"
2021	Reno 911! The Hunt for QAnon	QAnon Cruise Check-In Person	TV movie; cameo
2022	Roar	Lily	Episode: "The Woman Who Was Fed By a Duck"
2022	Grace and Frankie	Missy Pachangas	Episodes: "The Prediction" and "The Panic Attacks"
2022	Wednesday	Dr. Valerie Kinbott	Main role (season 1)
2023–2024	Monster High	Purrsephone	Voice, 4 episodes
2023	Animaniacs	Mother	Voice, episode: "Murder Pals"
2023	The Muppets Mayhem	Justine the Belieber	Episode: "Track 8: Virtual Insanity"
2023	Strange Planet	Lonely / Early Being #3	Voice, episode: "The Flying Machine"
2025	Mickey Mouse Funhouse	Ana the Ant / Zee Doop	Voice, 2 episodes
2025	Krapopolis	Lucy / Tar Maid	Voice, episode: "Baby Bloom"
2025–present	Haunted Hotel	Annabelle	Voice; recurring role
2026	Stuart Fails to Save the Universe	Ramona Nowitzki	3 episodes, role reprised from The Big Bang Theory

=== Web ===
Year	Title	Role	Notes
2007–2009	Girltrash!	LouAnne "Trouble" Dubois	8 episodes
2010	Tea Party Macabre	Herself	5 episodes
2012	Garfunkel and Oates	Garfunkel	Episode: "Pilot"
2013	Jon Davis Gets a Sex Robot	Layla Davis	4 episodes
2016–2017	Con Man	Janet Carney	4 episodes
2021	"My Sweet Lord"	Backup BOC Agent	George Harrison music video

== Discography ==
- Yell at Me from Your Car EP (2011)
- No Worries If Not (2025)
