= Queens of the Dead =

2025 horror comedy film by Tina Romero

- Theatrical release poster
- Directed by: Tina Romero
- Written by: Tina Romero; Erin Judge
- Produced by: Matthew Lee Miller; Natalie Metzger
- Starring: Katy O'Brian; Jaquel Spivey; Riki Lindhome; Jack Haven; Cheyenne Jackson
- Cinematography: Shannon Madden
- Edited by: Aden Hakimi
- Music by: Blitz//Berlin
- Production companies: Independent Film Company; Shudder; Vanishing Angle; Helmstreet Productions; Creativity Capital; Flexibon Films
- Distributed by: Independent Film Company; Shudder
- Release dates: June 7, 2025 (Tribeca Festival); October 24, 2025 (United States)
- Running time: 101 minutes
- Country: United States
- Language: English
- Box office: $113,123

Queens of the Dead is a 2025 American zombie comedy film written and directed by Tina Romero. It stars Katy O'Brian, Jaquel Spivey, Riki Lindhome, Jack Haven, Cheyenne Jackson, and Margaret Cho.

== Premise ==
The film follows a group of drag queens, club kids, and frenemies who must put aside their personal dramas and use their unique skills to fight the flesh-thirsty undead when a zombie apocalypse breaks out on the night of a giant warehouse party.

== Cast ==
- Katy O'Brian as Dre
- Jaquel Spivey as Sam
- Riki Lindhome as Lizzy
- Jack Haven as Kelsey
- Cheyenne Jackson as Jimmy
- Margaret Cho as Pops
- Shaunette Renée Wilson as Tiger
- Eve Lindley as Jane
- Karan Brar as Officer Trayvis
- Nina West as Ginsey
- Tomas Matos as Nico
- Quincy Dunn-Baker as Barry
- Becca Blackwell as Twiz
- Dominique Jackson as Yasmine
- Tom Savini as Mayor

== Production ==
Deadline reported in July 2024 that the film was in the works from a script by director Tina Romero as well as Erin Judge, with Jaquel Spivey, Katy O’Brian, Margaret Cho, Jack Haven, and Cheyenne Jackson set to star. The film was also reported to feature Nina West, Tomas Matos, Quincy Dunn-Baker, Becca Blackwell, Shaunette Renée Wilson, Dominique Jackson, Riki Lindhome, and Eve Lindley. It was produced by Natalie Metzger and Matthew Lee Miller for Vanishing Angle and financed by Creativity Capital. It was later reported that IFC Films, Shudder, and Flexibon Films would also help produce the film, with Charades acquiring the international sales rights to the film and filming had taken place on October 25, 2024, with a first-look image being released.

== Release ==
The film premiered at the Tribeca Festival on June 7, 2025.

In July 2025, Independent Film Company and Shudder, both of which helped co-finance the film, acquired North American distribution rights to it. The film was released in the United States on October 24, 2025.

The film was screened in non-competitive section 'Freestyle' of the 20th Rome Film Festival in October 2025.

== Reception ==
On the review aggregator website Rotten Tomatoes, 84% of 56 critics' reviews are positive, with an average rating of 6.8/10. The website's consensus reads: "Setting the stage to slay all day, Tina Romero's feature debut is a glowing zombie-fest filled with humor and heart, proving that there's more than enough room in the genre for these Queens of the Dead." Metacritic, which uses a weighted average, assigned the film a score of 68 out of 100, based on 7 critics, indicating "generally favorable" reviews.

== Awards & Nominations ==
Award	Year	Category	Recipient	Result	Ref.
America's Rainbow Film Festival (ARFF)	2025	Pride Award	Tina Romero	Won	
Film Club's The Lost Weekend	2025	Lost Weekend Award Best Comedy	Tina Romero	Nominated	
Film Club's The Lost Weekend	2025	Lost Weekend Award Best Horror Feature	Tina Romero	Won	
Heartland International Film Festival	2025	Audience Choice Award Horror	Tina Romero	Won	
Tribeca Film Festival	2025	Audience Award Narritive	Tina Romero	Won	
