= Artist Descending a Staircase =

Play by Tom Stoppard

Artist Descending a Staircase is a radio play by Tom Stoppard, first broadcast by the BBC in 1972, and later adapted for live theatre. The play centres on a murder mystery involving an artist who dies from falling down a set of stairs. The play is a humorous exploration of the meaning and purpose of art. The title alludes to Marcel Duchamp's 1912 painting Nude Descending a Staircase, No. 2.

== Plot ==
The play opens with the sound of the artist, Donner, falling down the stairs. The other two roommates, Martello and Beauchamp, enter and find him at the bottom of the staircase. Beauchamp, an artist whose focus is on the sounds of daily life, examines a recording of the sounds of Donner's fall. The pair decides that a murderer must have awakened Donner from his sleep and then pushed him down the stairs to his death. Martello and Beauchamp accuse each other of the crime. The following scenes flash back to several different years at least 50 years in the past. This part of the play follows the three artists and their interactions with a blind woman named Sophie. The end of the play returns to the present. Martello and Beauchamp are unable to solve the mystery.

== Original production ==
The play was originally broadcast on BBC Radio 3 on 14 November 1972. It is now available on the BBC CD Tom Stoppard Radio Plays.

In January 2016, BBC Radio 3 revived the play with a cast that included Derek Jacobi, Ian McDiarmid, Geoffrey Whitehead and Pippa Nixon.

== Theatrical production ==
A stage adaptation, written by Stoppard, was first performed at the King's Head Theatre, Islington, London in 1988, which later transferred to The Duke of York's Theatre, London. It featured the following cast:

- Peter Copley – Beauchamp
- Gareth Tudor Price – Young Beauchamp
- William Lucas – Martello
- Karl James – Young Martello
- Frank Middlemas – Donner
- John Warnaby – Young Donner
- Sarah Woodward – Sophie

Directed by Tim Luscombe.

Subsequently performed at R.J. Reynolds Theatre, on the Duke University campus, in 1989.

It was followed by a Broadway production, at the Helen Hayes Theater. It featured the following cast:

- Michael Cumpsty – Young Beauchamp
- Jim Fyfe – Young Martello
- Harold Gould – Beauchamp
- John McMartin – Donner
- Stephanie Roth – Sophie
- Paxton Whitehead – Martello
- Michael Winther – Young Donner

The play was re-staged in December 2009, for the first time in twenty years, at the Old Red Lion Theatre in Islington, London, with the following cast:

- Jeremy Child – Beauchamp
- Olivia Darnley – Sophie
- Ryan Gage – Young Martello
- Max Irons – Young Donner
- Edward Petherbridge – Donner
- Alex Robertson – Young Beauchamp
- David Weston – Martello

In 2022 the play returned to the King's Head with the original cast's three young artists taking the roles of their older counterparts. It featured the following cast:

- Karl James - Martello
- Gareth Tudor Price - Beauchamp
- John Warnaby - Donner
- Nicholas Armfield - Young Martello
- Benjamin Prudence - Young Beauchamp
- Barnaby Tobias - Young Donner
- Francesca Eldred - Sophie
- Stage Directions realised by Rosalind Lailey
