= Annie Hamilton =

American actress (born 1992)

- Born: September 17, 1992 (age 33); Manhattan, New York City
- Education: Stella Adler Studio of Acting
- Occupations: Film and television actress
- Years active: 2012–present

Annie Hamilton (born September 17, 1992) is an American actress. She is known for her roles in films such as The Wolf of Snow Hollow (2020), Between the Temples (2024), and Wake Up Dead Man: A Knives Out Mystery (2025).

== Early life ==
Hamilton was born in the Upper West Side neighborhood of Manhattan, New York City. She began her acting training at the Stella Adler Studio of Acting, attending their Teen Summer Conservatory program in 2010.

== Career ==
Hamilton made her feature film debut in 2016 as Emily in the dance comedy Dance Camp. She followed this with a supporting role as Cathy Rothman in the mockumentary Drib (2017).

In 2019, she appeared in an uncredited minor role as Nora's Assistant in Noah Baumbach's Marriage Story. Her breakthrough came in 2020 with the role of Brianne Paulson in the horror comedy The Wolf of Snow Hollow.

She continued with supporting roles in independent films, including Lindsay in Safe Space (2022) and Monica in Dark Windows (2023).

In 2024, Hamilton played Dr. Rachel Plotnik, a cosmetic surgeon, in Nathan Silver's comedy Between the Temples, alongside Jason Schwartzman and Carol Kane. Her performance was noted for its straight-faced intensity in reviews.

In 2025, she appeared as Grace Wicks in Rian Johnson's Wake Up Dead Man: A Knives Out Mystery, the third film in the Knives Out series, opposite Daniel Craig. Her character is the troubled mother of Monsignor Jefferson Wicks (Josh Brolin), described in the story as a scorned figure known by unsavory names in the religious community.

Hamilton has also appeared in television, including a recurring role in Dickinson and one-shot roles Hawkeye as Ana, Inventing Anna, and American Horror Stories.

She is known for her confessional comedy and online presence during the pandemic. She has been interviewed in outlets like Bomb, Cultured, and others, discussing her creative process and life experiences.

== Filmography ==
=== Film ===
List of film appearances, with year released, title, role(s), and reference shown
Year	Title	Role(s)	Ref.
2015	The Fog	Jessica	
2016	Dance Camp	Emily	
2017	DRIB	Cathy Rothman	
2019	Marriage Story	Nora's Assistant (uncredited)	
2019	47 Hours to Live	Rose	
2020	The Wolf of Snow Hollow	Brianne Paulson	
2022	Mack & Rita	Influencer	
2022	Safe Space	Lindsay	
2023	Dark Windows	Monica	
2024	Between the Temples	Dr. Rachel Plotnik	
2024	The Reunion	Hannah	
2025	Wake Up Dead Man: A Knives Out Mystery	Grace Wicks	
2026	Outcome	Hazel	

=== Television ===
List of television appearances, with year released, title, role, notes, and reference shown
Year(s)	Title	Role(s)	Notes	Ref.
2019–2021	Dickinson	Florence	Recurring role	
2021	Hawkeye	Ana	Episode: "Ronin"	
2022	Inventing Anna	Young Starlet	Episode: "Friends in Low Places"	
2023	American Horror Stories	Sarah Miller / Annie Hamilton	Episode: "Daphne"	
