= Wow (Barry) =

"wow"
- Barry episode
- Episode no.: Season 4 Episode 8
- Directed by: Bill Hader
- Written by: Bill Hader
- Cinematography by: Carl Herse
- Editing by: Franky Guttman; Ali Greer
- Original air date: May 28, 2023
- Running time: 34 minutes

Guest appearances
- Fred Melamed as Tom Posorro; Charles Parnell as DA Buckner; Zachary Golinger as John; Gary Kraus as Chief Krauss; Tobie Windham as "Groove Tube" Damian; Andre Hyland as "Live Wire" Jason; Jaeden Martell as Teenage John; Ross Partridge as Robert; Julian Zane Chowdhury as Eric; Jim Cummings as Movie Barry Berkman; Louisa Krause as Movie Sally Reed; Michael Cumpsty as Movie Gene Cousineau; Kimberly Hébert Gregory as Movie Janice Moss; Finn Sweeney as Movie John

Episode chronology
← Previous "a nice meal"	Next → —

"wow" is the series finale of the American crime tragicomedy television series Barry. It is the eighth episode of the fourth season and the 32nd overall episode of the series. The episode was written and directed by series creator Bill Hader, who also serves as lead actor. It was first broadcast on HBO in the United States on May 28, 2023, and also was available on Max on the same date.

The series follows Barry Berkman, a hitman from Cleveland who travels to Los Angeles to kill someone but finds himself joining an acting class taught by Gene Cousineau, where he meets aspiring actress Sally Reed and begins to question his path in life as he deals with his criminal associates such as Monroe Fuches and NoHo Hank. The previous seasons saw Barry try to decide between both lives, which culminated in his arrest, while the final season followed his character's escape from prison, runaway life with Sally and eventual return to LA to tie up loose ends and gain control over his legacy. In the finale, Barry sets out to save Sally and their son John, while the conflict between Hank and Fuches reaches its end. Later, when Barry is confronted with a choice as he learns Gene is being blamed for Janice Moss's murder, Gene's impulsivity leads to severe consequences.

According to Nielsen Media Research, the episode was seen by an estimated 0.234 million household viewers and gained a 0.05 ratings share among adults aged 18–49. The final episode received acclaim from critics, who expressed praise for the directing, performances, cinematography and closure. The final scene, however, polarized critics; while most viewed it as a fitting examination of its series-long themes, some questioned the logic and characterization. For the episode, Bill Hader received nominations for Outstanding Directing for a Comedy Series and Outstanding Writing for a Comedy Series at the 75th Primetime Emmy Awards.

== Plot ==
Hank (Anthony Carrigan) calls Fuches (Stephen Root) to make peace by giving him Barry (Bill Hader), but Fuches is not interested until Hank shows him Sally (Sarah Goldberg) and John (Zachary Golinger).

Buckner (Charles Parnell) and Jim (Robert Wisdom) announce that Janice Moss's murder case has been re-opened with Gene (Henry Winkler) as a suspect. Sally confesses to John that they are fugitives: Barry is an escaped killer, and she killed a man. (Note: As depicted in "starting now".) Hank's henchmen then take Sally to meet Fuches.

Fuches arrives at Nohobal with his gang, demanding to see John, then offers to disappear if Hank takes responsibility for Cristobal's death. Hank tearfully admits his regrets with Cristobal. As John is brought out, Hank angrily changes his mind and reaches for his gun. Fuches shoots Hank and shields John as a shootout erupts, leaving Fuches as the last gangster standing. He escorts John outside, past a dazed Sally. Barry heavily arms himself with guns and prays for redemption through sacrificing himself to save John, but when he arrives at Nohobal, John runs into his arms. Barry exchanges a look with Fuches, who walks away. Hank dies grasping the hand of Cristobal's statue.

At a motel, Sally, concerned that Gene might go to prison, urges Barry to turn himself in, but Barry claims that their survival means God has redeemed him. The next morning, Barry discovers that Sally and John have left. At Gene's home, Gene reads negative articles about him and contemplates suicide, and Tom (Fred Melamed) secretly plans to leave him for good when Barry arrives looking for his family. When Tom assures him he has not seen them and confirms that Gene is being framed for Janice's death, a convinced Barry asks Tom to call the police so he can turn himself in. Before Tom can do so, Barry is suddenly shot in the shoulder. A vengeful Gene enters the living room and shoots Barry dead, then silently awaits his arrest.

Years later, Sally is a respected high school theater teacher. After an Our Town performance, she declines to go on a date with Robert (Ross Partridge), a history teacher. With Sally's permission, a well-adjusted teenage John (Jaeden Martell) visits his friend Eric (Julian Zane Chowdhury), who shows him The Mask Collector, (Note: In reference to a term Gene used to describe himself.) the biopic about Barry that John has waited several years to see, implying that Sally forbade it. Barry (Jim Cummings) is portrayed as a traumatized Marine with no criminal history who moves to Los Angeles and joins Gene's acting class to cope. He becomes suspicious of Gene (Michael Cumpsty), depicted as British, when he finds him and Ryan Madison talking to two Chechens. Gene, an undercover Chechen mafia leader, murders Janice (Kimberly Hébert Gregory) while she is investigating Ryan's death and implicates Barry when he refuses to dispose of the body. Barry escapes from prison and eventually returns to LA, where he rescues Sally (Louisa Krause) and John (Finn Sweeney) from the Chechens before Gene repeatedly shoots him. The film's epilogue states that Gene was sentenced to life in prison for the murders of Janice and Barry, while Barry was buried in Arlington National Cemetery with full honors. John becomes emotional and cracks a faint smile.

== Production ==
=== Development ===
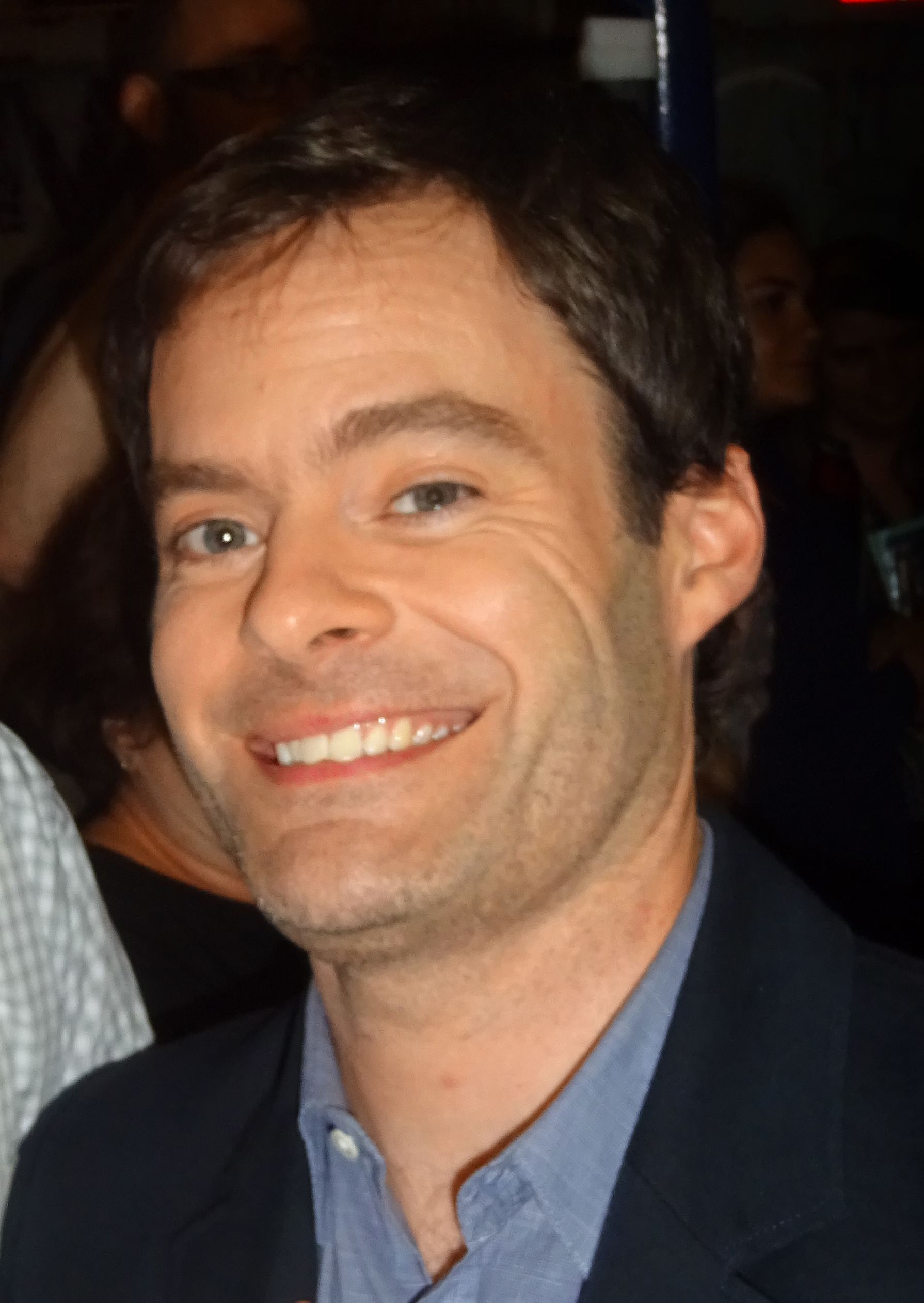
The series finale was written and directed by series co-creator and lead actor Bill Hader.

In March 2023, it was announced that the fourth season of the series would be the last. Bill Hader explained, "What happens in Season 4 is structurally radical in some ways, but it made sense for what I think the characters needed to go through, and what I think the whole show is always kind of headed towards. You realize, well, we could pad a lot of stuff, and just make story. But if we're going forward, it ends in Season 4."

In May 2023, the finale's title was revealed as "wow" and it was announced that series creator and lead actor Bill Hader had written and directed it. This was Hader's twelfth writing credit, and his eighteenth directing credit.

=== Writing ===
Bill Hader came up with the concept of Gene killing Barry while developing the second season, where the writers introduced Rip Torn's gun. As such, part of the season was built towards the moment. Hader informed Henry Winkler halfway through the season that Gene would shoot Barry in the end. Winkler expressed surprise at the reveal, although he considered that his character, who has no dialogue in the finale, would eventually succumb after the events of the previous episode. Winkler did not believe the character would think of the consequences, feeling "If this is the ruse that they put me under, it must have been him. And there's no more winning. This is the end of the game." He believed that his character was "close to insanity" and speculated that he would still try to find another chance at fame even after being sentenced to life in prison, potentially by forming an acting company with the inmates. Barry's death was filmed twice. A slight difference is that Barry's last words were going to be "You don't have to do this, Mr. Cousineau", before being changed to simply "Oh, wow." Winkler never considered that Gene would kill himself, saying "I'm too valuable. Gene and his own mind were just too valuable to kill himself. There's always another student to Barnum and Bailey." Originally, Gene would not only kill Barry, but Jim Moss as well, as he was manipulated into believing Barry's innocence. Hader viewed it similarly to the assassination of Harvey Milk and George Moscone, but chose to not depict it as the writers felt it was "needless bloodshed."

Anthony Carrigan called Hank's death "poetic", explaining, "Ironically, he wanted to play gangster, and when you're a gangster you tend to die a gangster's death." Regarding Fuches asking Hank to make a "confession", he said, "When Hank is faced with that decision, he's being flooded with guilt and sadness, but there's that danger there as well. I think that's why he couldn't quite fully commit." He noted that the shootout was not planned by Hader to glorify violence but to present a realistic outcome of an intense gunfight. He further added, "it was surreal seeing this character who I love so much die, but as an actor, I was also letting go of the show as well so there were a lot of things happening all at once." On Hank dying while holding the hand of Cristobal's statue, he said, "it's him seeing very clearly what he has lost in this life based on those choices. There's something beautiful about him ending it holding Cristobal's cold, metal hand — but there's something really terrifying about it."

Commenting on Sally's final scene, Sarah Goldberg said, "She had these huge ambitions and, and what's lovely is, you know, she's sitting there in the car with this bouquet of supermarket flowers next to her. And it could be an Oscar. What it represents to her is a tiny, micro version of that recognition, the contentment that she had been searching for on a massive scale." She viewed the ending as a "happy ending" for Sally, feeling it worked better than having Sally become an actress. She also affirmed that while she grew as a character, she would remain narcissistic, saying "when we leave her, she's still Sally. It's not like she’s completely evolved, but she's in a much better place than when we started. I just thought it was beautiful, poetic, and very, very simple." She also commented on Barry's death, "If this is a morality tale, then there's the question of consequences or repercussions. It's brave storytelling to kill your lead. There's a fun finality to it. It's really over."

== Reception ==
=== Ratings ===
The episode was watched by 0.234 million viewers, earning a 0.05 in the 18-49 rating demographics on the Nielson ratings scale. This means that 0.05 percent of all households with televisions watched the episode. This was a slight decrease from the previous episode, which was watched by 0.237 million viewers with a 0.07 in the 18-49 demographics.

=== Critical reception ===
"wow" received acclaim from critics, however some were left underwhelmed by the final scene. The review aggregator website Rotten Tomatoes reported an 86% approval rating for the episode, with an average rating of 9.4/10 and based on 14 critic's reviews. The site's consensus states: "Clever and tidy, Barry's finale lacks a certain "Wow" factor but serves as a fitting coda to a series that always defied audience expectations."

Ben Rosenstock of Vulture gave the finale a perfect 5 star rating out of 5 and wrote, "It isn't a huge surprise that the show does grant Sally and John some way out in the end. Barry is a dark show but rarely a completely hopeless one. There's a consistency to the moral universe of this series, and in this finale, one pattern holds true: Those who deny their true selves will be punished, while those who endure the pain of seeing themselves with clear eyes will be shown mercy." Stuart Heritage of The Guardian also gave the finale a perfect 5 star rating out of 5 and wrote, "Barry has concluded with 'wow', an episode of television that pulled off the remarkable job of creating a definitive ending and leaping forward a decade (for the second time in a month), while still managing to be the bitter Hollywood satire it always was."

Matt Schimkowitz of The A.V. Club gave the episode a "B+" and wrote, "Over its short run, Barry became a show about the ways we perceive, mythologize, and try to shed ourselves of the responsibility of the violence around us. The ways we turn our heads from it and try to process it. Barry treated its characters as bad guys in a society that celebrates them." Brian Lowry of CNN wrote, "In metaphorical terms the Barry finale, similarly, couldn't entirely redeem the season's shortcomings. But in the moments when it was good the episode captured what had made the series so distinctive and did, indeed, have a 'Wow' factor." Josh Spiegel of /Film wrote, "I'll be honest: while I thought most of 'wow' did an excellent job of wrapping up the stories of these characters, the epilogue — as well as the throughline of what happens to our version of Gene, not the movie version — rings somewhat false."

Alan Sepinwall of Rolling Stone wrote, "There is so much greatness in the finale, just as there has been in Barry as a whole, but it's an oddly muted way to go out — even if you consider the real end of the story to be Barry's final words and the cut to black." Jeremy Gordon of The Atlantic wrote, "By the end, the show was out of surprises. There were no more 'WHAT?!' moments, no more inventive narrative jolts, few examples of that singular comedic register. But perhaps that's the truth about bad people who've finally shed their delusions: They're not that surprising, or funny. In its final episodes, Barry leaned into tragedy and resignation because that's all its characters had left."

=== Final scene ===
The final scene, in which a teenage John sees Barry's biopic, drew analysis. Matt Schimkowitz of The A.V. Club said, "In its final frame, Barry asks us to consider what effect watching violence has on us as viewers. With John's slight smile of relief, the mayhem that Barry presented is now fodder for mindless entertainment that belittle the real victims." Alan Sepinwall said, "Even beyond all the facts it gets wildly wrong, The Mask Collector is the hacky Hollywood version of the story we've been watching for the last four seasons. The dialogue is laden with clichés, Barry and Gene's early teacher-student relationship is uncomplicated and straight out of the inspiring professor playbook, and the action has absolutely none of the distinctiveness that Hader and company have deployed on the series. In some ways, the sequence plays less as satire than as a celebration of Barry itself: reminding us one last time of how great and unique it was by letting us see how bad this material could have been handled."

Inkoo Kang of The New Yorker wrote, "At least for the time being, John would rather believe the Hollywood version of his dad. And if some viewers still want to believe that Barry is the hero, or even the antihero, of Barry — a sentiment that Hader himself has expressed befuddlement at — the show seems to imply that they are just as deluded as the character is." James Poniewozik said, "As for Barry, if he was never redeemed in reality, he has been by fiction, in a made-for-Hollywood lie. It's the perfect crime." Goldberg gave her own thoughts, "it felt like it was a very dark commentary on humanity and what we choose to believe. And, you know, you could say the whole of Barry was a metaphor for America." She further added about John, "I hope he's going to be okay. I feel like if he's not, he got it honestly. Like, that's a tough break, having Sally and Barry for parents." Carrigan said, "The ending is essentially what Hollywood would do to this story."

The scene polarized critics. Matt Schimkowitz of The A.V. Club deemed it fitting with the theme of the series, saying, "Barry was a bad guy with no heart, a product of a violent culture that gave him nothing but a gun and told him to kill. Now, he's a hero. Tricky legacies." Ben Rosenstock of Vulture was also positive, writing, "the most curious, ambiguous aspect of this ending is the episode-ending expression on John's face: grief, but also catharsis. It brought me back, again, to all the distorted narratives that have provided these characters meaning over the years: Sally's portrayal of her marriage, Gene's one-person show, or the various embellishments of Barry's military stories. The cinematic version of Barry is a better man than the real Barry, which is why he would've wanted his son to see this — and why Sally doesn't." Angie Han of The Hollywood Reporter wrote, "Barry knows well what kinds of stories we tell to comfort ourselves. In its final half-hour, it refuses to become one itself."

In contrast, Alan Sepinwall criticized the thin characterization of John and also questioned the logic behind the scene, "the series has kept just enough of a toe dipped into the real world that it requires some pretty massive leaps in logic for this to work. You could handwave some of it away as The Mask Collector playing fast and loose with the facts in the manner of many Hollywood biopics. But this is the only version we're seeing of how the story has been interpreted by the public, and John's reaction to it suggests that this is the interpretation he can believe, because he's never heard another one." Josh Spiegel said, "I just continue to find it a little too hard to believe that Gene would be successfully thrown in jail for the murders of both Janice and Barry (especially Janice, seeing as he didn't, y'know, kill her)."

=== Accolades ===
Award	Category	Nominee(s)	Result	Ref.
Hollywood Critics Association TV Awards	Best Directing in a Broadcast Network or Cable Series, Comedy	Bill Hader	Nominated	
Hollywood Critics Association TV Awards	Best Writing in a Broadcast Network or Cable Series, Comedy	Bill Hader	Nominated	
Primetime Emmy Awards	Outstanding Directing for a Comedy Series	Bill Hader	Nominated	
Primetime Emmy Awards	Outstanding Writing for a Comedy Series	Bill Hader	Nominated	
Primetime Creative Arts Emmy Awards	Outstanding Picture Editing for a Single-Camera Comedy Series	Franky Guttman and Ali Greer	Nominated	
Primetime Creative Arts Emmy Awards	Outstanding Sound Editing for a Comedy or Drama Series (Half-Hour) and Animation	Sean Heissinger, Matthew E. Taylor, John Creed, Rickley W. Dumm, Deron Street, Clay Weber, Michael Brake, Darrin Mann, Alyson Dee Moore, and Chris Moriana	Nominated	
Primetime Creative Arts Emmy Awards	Outstanding Sound Mixing for a Comedy or Drama Series (Half-Hour) and Animation	Elmo Ponsdomenech, Teddy Salas, Scott Harber, and Aaron Hasson	Nominated	
