= Lauren Adams (actress) =

American actress and improviser

- Born: Lauren Conlin Adams; Washington, D.C., U.S.
- Education: Elon University (BFA)
- Occupations: Actress, comedian
- Years active: 2004–present

Lauren Conlin Adams is an American actress and improviser living in New York City.

== Early life and education ==
Adams was born in Washington, D.C. in 1982 and grew up in Potomac, Maryland. She graduated from Elon University in North Carolina with a BFA in 2004.

== Career ==
Adams has studied at the Upright Citizens Brigade since August 2007 under Bobby Moynihan, Lennon Parham, Zach Woods, Michael Delaney, Anthony King and Chris Gethard. At UCB, Lauren performed Oscarbait and was a member of former Maude Team Slow Burn and former Harold Teams Johnny Romance and Sherlock & Cookies. She still performs regularly as a member of the Upright Citizens Brigade Theatre.

In Netflix's series Unbreakable Kimmy Schmidt, Adams played Gretchen Chalker, a willing, overzealous member of the cult, who believed everything she was told and who failed to adapt to life outside of a cult. Adams also appeared in an episode of The Break with Michelle Wolf titled “Bad Opinions,” in a skit about the New York Times op-ed section.

== Filmography ==
=== Film ===
Year	Title	Role	Notes
2013	A New McDonalds	Lucy	
2017	(Romance) in the Digital Age	Rosa	
2019	Greener Grass	Erika / Cheryl Hoad	

=== Television ===
Year	Title	Role	Notes
2009	Nice Brothers	Interviewer	Episode: "The Nice Brothers Part 2"
2011	Musicals in Real Life	iPad Woman	2 episodes
2011–2015	CollegeHumor Originals	Various	6 episodes
2012	Jest Originals	Leslie / Hippie / Cashier	3 episodes
2012	The B.S. of A. with Brian Sack	Various	5 episodes; also writer
2013	Very Mary-Kate	Stand-In	Episode: "Instagram"
2013	Pursuit of Sexiness	Shop Girl	Episode: "Thrift Shop"
2014	Improv Everywhere Originals	Olympic Runner	Episode: "Surprise Torch Run"
2014	Above Average Presents	Lauren	3 episodes
2014	Good Dads	Park Mom	Television film
2015	I Hate Being Single	Lonely Bridesmaid	Episode: "Marriage Meat"
2015	Nepotism	Crafty Extra	Episode: "Extra Crafty"
2015–2019	Unbreakable Kimmy Schmidt	Gretchen Chalker	20 episodes
2016	Netflix Presents: The Characters	Laura	Episode: "Natasha Rothwell"
2016	Deadbeat	Carol	3 episodes
2018	Myrtle & Willoughby	ShackR Lady	Episode: "#Chase"
2019	Last Week Tonight with John Oliver	Homeowner's friend	Episode: "Mobile Homes"
2019	Adam Ruins Everything	Lady Liberty	Episode: "Adam Ruins America"
2019	Modern Family	Campbell	Episode: "Tree's a Crowd"
2020	Unbreakable Kimmy Schmidt: Kimmy vs the Reverend	Gretchen Chalker	Television film
2025	Last Week Tonight with John Oliver	Air traffic controller	Episode 333
