= Dance Camp =

- Promotional release poster
- Directed by: Bert & Bertie
- Screenplay by: Nick Turner; Rex New; Cameron Fay
- Story by: Nick Turner; Rex New
- Produced by: Jon M. Chu; Hieu Ho; Matt Kaplan; Brian Robbins
- Cinematography: Alice Brooks
- Edited by: Jane Moran
- Music by: Rob Lord
- Production company: AwesomenessTV
- Distributed by: YouTube Red
- Release date: February 10, 2016 (YouTube Red)
- Running time: 83 minutes
- Country: United States
- Language: English

Dance Camp is a 2016 American comedy-drama web film produced exclusively for YouTube Red as an original film, directed by Bert & Bertie and written by Nick Turner and Rex New. The film was released on February 10, 2016. The film is produced by AwesomenessTV.

== Premise ==
The plot is about Hunter (Nadji Jeter) who is sent to a dance camp, where he meets a bunch of eclectic misfits. He is eventually inspired to take down a rival dance group led by Lance (Jake Paul) and along the way also falls in love with Cheyenne (Meg DeAngelis).

== Cast ==
- Meg DeAngelis as Cheyenne
- Nadji Jeter as Hunter
- Jake Paul as Lance
- Niki and Gabi as Mya and Mia
- Annie Hamilton as Emily
- Brandon Perea as Kenton
