= Greener Grass =

2019 film by Jocelyn DeBoer and Dawn Luebbe

- Release poster
- Directed by: Jocelyn DeBoer; Dawn Luebbe
- Written by: Jocelyn DeBoer; Dawn Luebbe
- Based on: Greener Grass by Paul Briganti
- Produced by: Natalie Metzger
- Starring: Jocelyn DeBoer; Dawn Luebbe; Beck Bennett; Neil Casey; Mary Holland; Janicza Bravo; D'Arcy Carden
- Cinematography: Lowell A. Meyer
- Edited by: Taylor Gianotas
- Music by: Samuel Nobles
- Production companies: Gulp Splash Productions; Vanishing Angle; 30West
- Distributed by: IFC Midnight
- Release dates: January 26, 2019 (Sundance); October 18, 2019 (United States)
- Running time: 100 minutes
- Country: United States
- Language: English
- Box office: $76,045

Greener Grass is a 2019 American surrealist satirical black comedy film written and directed by Jocelyn DeBoer and Dawn Luebbe in their feature directorial debuts. It stars DeBoer, Luebbe, Beck Bennett, Neil Casey, Mary Holland, Janicza Bravo, and D'Arcy Carden. The film had its world premiere at the 2019 Sundance Film Festival, and was released in select theaters and on VOD in the United States on October 18, 2019, by IFC Midnight.

== Plot ==
Jill Davies is a housewife who lives in a bizarre, unnamed suburban town, where all the adults wear dental braces and drive golf carts instead of cars. She is married to Nick, with a seven-year-old son named Julian and an infant daughter named Madison. She is friends and rivals with Lisa Wetbottom, placing Julian and Lisa's son, Bob, in competition with each other. Throughout the film, Jill is stalked by a mysterious giggling person.

Jill chats with Lisa on the sideline of their children's soccer game. They briefly discuss the recent murder of a local yoga teacher before Lisa compliments Madison. On a whim, Jill asks if Lisa would like to have Madison as her own daughter; Lisa accepts.

Jill and Nick are frustrated by Julian, an eccentric young boy who is bad at sports and frequently urinates himself, which Jill and Julian argue about at Nick's birthday party. Julian sings to his father before abruptly falling face-first into the swimming pool and re-emerges as a Golden Retriever. Jill and Nick continue sending Julian to school dressed in human clothing. Nick delights in playing with his newly athletic "son", but Jill misses Julian as he used to be, and their marriage begins to fray.

In the parking lot after school, Jill asks Lisa if she could have Madison (now named Paige) back. Lisa, hurt, refuses to let her go. Later at a soccer game, Lisa picks up the soccer ball and places it under her dress, mimicking a baby bump. She is congratulated by her friends for her pregnancy, and eventually "gives birth" to the soccer ball, naming it "Twilson" and treating it as a third child.

After encouragement from her friends while bowling, Jill tells Nick that she wants a divorce, casting him out of the house. Upon returning one day, he finds Julian alone in the backyard without clothes on while Jill is out getting a haircut. Aghast, Nick takes Julian from Jill, devastating her. She rings Lisa's doorbell and begs for her daughter back, but Lisa angrily refuses, telling Jill that it is her fault she has no children anymore. Jill returns home, only to run into her stalker, a delusional middle-aged woman who screams at Jill to leave her house.

Manic and distraught, Jill rides her golf cart out of town and onto the highway, stopping near a cow pasture to remove her braces with wire cutters. She arrives at the house where she grew up, currently occupied by a single woman with four children. After asking if she can have one of the woman's children, Jill kidnaps one and takes her to a diner. There, she sees on the news that her stalker (who also murdered the yoga teacher) was arrested after being discovered by Lisa.

Returning to town the next day, Jill watches her kidnapped "daughter" play soccer with the other children. She learns that Lisa had moved her family into Jill's house, with Nick serving as a pool boy. After realizing that the children are playing soccer over graves, Jill stands up from the bleachers and declares that she needs to leave. The referee admonishes her for being "out of bounds", and Jill immediately sits back down.

== Cast ==
- Jocelyn DeBoer as Jill
- Dawn Luebbe as Lisa
- Beck Bennett as Nick
- Neil Casey as Dennis
- Mary Holland as Kim Ann
- D'Arcy Carden as Miss Human
- Janicza Bravo as Marriott
- Dot-Marie Jones as Little Helen
- Lauren Adams as Erika
- Julian Hilliard as Julian
- Asher Miles Fallica as Bob
- John Milhiser as the photographer
- Jim Cummings as Rob
- Hollyn Johnson as Citronella
- Jaxon Rose Moore as Raja

== Production ==
Greener Grass is based on the 2015 short film of the same name, directed by Paul Briganti and co-written by Jocelyn DeBoer and Dawn Luebbe. In October 2018, it was announced that DeBoer, Luebbe, Beck Bennett, Neil Casey, Mary Holland, D'Arcy Carden, Janicza Bravo, Dot-Marie Jones, Jim Cummings, Lauren Adams, Asher Miles Fallica, Julian Hilliard, and John Milhiser had joined the cast of the film, with DeBoer and Luebbe directing from a screenplay they wrote. Natalie Metzger served as the producer on the film. Greener Grass was filmed on location in Peachtree City, Georgia.

== Release and reception ==
The film had its world premiere at the Sundance Film Festival on January 26, 2019. Prior to, IFC Midnight acquired distribution rights to the film. It also screened at South by Southwest on March 9, 2019. It was released in select theaters and on VOD in the United States on October 18, 2019.

On the review aggregator website Rotten Tomatoes, the film holds an approval rating of 81% based on 70 reviews, with an average rating of 7/10. The website's critics consensus reads, "Greener Grass is far from the first comedy to skewer suburbia – but it might be among the most bizarre and surreally distinctive." Metacritic, which uses a weighted average, assigned the film a score of 69 out of 100, based on 16 critics, indicating "generally favorable" reviews.

Peter Debruge of Variety called the film "an odd and wonderfully upbeat absurdist take on the American dream." Andee Tagle of NPR wrote, "Greener Grass may feel more like a long series of sketches than a feature-length film – but comedy aside, the punchy, Wes Anderson-meets-80's-music-video aesthetic of cinematographer Lowell A. Meyer, matched with Lauren Oppelt's impeccable costume design, offer delights of their own. But if not for the color or the comedy, maybe come for the social commentary. You'll be surprised... by how much a silly, madcap comedy such as this one might make you think."
