= Thunder Road (2016 film) =

- Directed by: Jim Cummings
- Written by: Jim Cummings
- Produced by: Mark Vashro
- Starring: Jim Cummings; Kitty Barshay; William Daubert
- Cinematography: Drew Daniels
- Edited by: Sound: ornana
- Music by: Bruce Springsteen; Father Andrew
- Distributed by: Vimeo
- Release date: January 21, 2016 (Sundance Film Festival)
- Running time: 13 minutes
- Country: United States
- Language: English
- Budget: $7,000

Thunder Road is a short comedy-drama film written, directed by, and starring Jim Cummings. Shot in one take, the film depicts a police officer giving a eulogy for his mother. It premiered at the 2016 Sundance Film Festival, where it received positive reviews, winning the Short Film Grand Jury Prize. A feature-length adaptation of the same name was released in 2018, also written, directed by, and starring Cummings.

== Synopsis ==
Police officer Arnaud eulogizes his mother at her funeral by singing and dancing to the Bruce Springsteen song "Thunder Road".

== Cast ==
- Jim Cummings as Jim Arnaud
- Kitty Barshay as Funeral Director
- Francesca Biasiolo as Crystal
- Melissa Papel as Carissa
- William Daubert as Police Chief

== Production ==
Cummings wrote the film over two months on his commutes to work at CollegeHumor. The film cost $7,000 to make, of which $2,500 was renting the funeral home. He sold his wedding rings to help fund it. Cummings did not license the song "Thunder Road" prior to its screening at Sundance. Springsteen later viewed the film and enjoyed it, and agreed to license it for online distribution for $1,000.

== Reception ==
On review aggregator Rotten Tomatoes, the film holds an approval rating of 100% based on 8 reviews, with an average rating of 7.3/10. Metacritic gives the film a weighted average score of 81 out of 100, based on 4 critics, indicating "universal acclaim".

The film was awarded at the Sundance Film Festival with the Short Film Grand Jury Prize, being called "a mini masterpiece of writing, directing and acting". Short of the Week called it "funny, inventive, and thought-provoking" and "the toast of this year’s American festival circuit", and IndieWire listed it as one of the best short films ever made.

=== Awards and nominations ===
Award	Date of ceremony	Category	Recipient	Result
Sundance Film Festival	January 28, 2016	Short Film Grand Jury Prize	Thunder Road	Won
South by Southwest	March 15, 2016	Jury Prize for Acting	Jim Cummings	Won
Los Angeles Film Festival	June 9, 2016	Jury Recognition for Outstanding Performance	Jim Cummings	Won
Palms Springs Shorts Fest	June 26, 2016	Jury Prize for Acting	Thunder Road	Won
Atlanta Film Festival	April 19, 2016	Best Narrative Short	Thunder Road	Won
HollyShorts Film Festival	August 19, 2016	Best Narrative Short	Thunder Road	Won
Rainier Independent Film Festival	May 19, 2016	Best Short Narrative	Thunder Road	Won
ShortList Film Festival	August 24, 2016	Creators League Prize	Thunder Road	Won
ÉCU Film Festival	April 12, 2016	Best Non-European Independent Dramatic Short Film	Thunder Road	Won
Provincetown International Film Festival	June 19, 2016	Best Narrative Short	Thunder Road	Won
