= Thunder Alley =

Thunder Alley may refer to:

- Thunder Alley (TV series), an American sitcom
- Thunder Alley (1967 film), a film about auto racing
- Thunder Alley (1985 film), an American drama film
- Thunder Alley (Kings Island), an amusement park attraction
