= I Hate Being Single =

- Genre: Comedy
- Created by: Rob Michael Hugel
- Starring: Rob Michael Hugel; Domenico Manzolillo; Shannon Coffey
- Composer: Jake Zavracky
- Country of origin: United States
- Original language: English
- No. of seasons: 2
- No. of episodes: 12

Production
- Producer: Rob Michael Hugel
- Production locations: Brooklyn, New York
- Running time: 1-10 minutes

Original release
- Network: Blip
- Release: February 21, 2012 – present

I Hate Being Single is an American comedy web series created and written by American director Rob Michael Hugel and funded by Kickstarter. The series is broadcast on the internet and premiered on Blip on January 1, 2012. So far, two seasons have been created. I Hate Being Single surrounds the life of Rob, a 20-something who struggles to find his place in the confusing world of friends, relationships, parties, and dating in Brooklyn. The cast is made up of NYC comedians from the Upright Citizens Brigade.

== History ==
I Hate Being Single was written by Rob Michael Hugel, and was inspired by his first few months living in New York and pursuing an acting career. Rob was also inspired by working as the director and editor of the web series 'Broad City'. In an interview, he mentions what it was like living in New York and where some of the ideas for I Hate Being Single came from: "Being new to town, getting over a breakup, trying to make friends or find my footing socially was full of ups and downs." Rob wanted to make a web series that was as close to his personal experiences as possible as a starting point. Rob states that 90 percent of the show is based on his own life .

The series won 'Bing Audience Choice Award Winner' at the 2011 New York Television Festival. I Hate Being Single is in the Official Selection at the International Film Festival Rotterdam 2013 and the Official Selection and nominee in five categories at the Indie Soap Awards 2013 including Best Writing Comedy and Best Director.

== Episodes ==
=== Season 1: 2012 ===
#	Title	Original airdate
1	"That's Love"	February 21, 2012
Rob is forced to start living as a single in Brooklyn and looks to Dom and Shannon for support.
2	"I’m a Mature"	March 8, 2012
Rob goes out to brunch with Shannon and her pals. He goes out on a date with a college crush and gets too comfortable with his new “snuggie”.
3	"The Banker"	March 20, 2012
Rob becomes friends with his banker, gains a lot of credit cards, and has an unfortunate encounter with a volunteer organisation worker.
4	"Wouldn't Wanna Be Ya"	April 3, 2012
Rob is pressured into attending a “get together” with Dom and his friend from work.
5	"Do You Like Me?"	April 17, 2012
Rob goes out on a date with an old elementary school crush.
6	"Finale Part 1"	May 22, 2012
Rob is tempted to contact his ex but falls into a secret group of boat-dwelling bachelors to learn how to embrace the Brooklyn single life.
7	"Finale Part 2"	May 29, 2012
Rob goes out on a catch-up date with his ex. The results of the date leave him with a new appetite for life.

=== Season 2: 2015 ===
#	Title	Original airdate
8	"Catching Up"	February 21, 2015
Rob is late for a wedding and runs into some familiar faces in the neighborhood.
9	"Marriage Meat"	February 25, 2015
Rob meets a bridesmaid at work and fears he might be part of a false engagement.
10	"Tag Me"	March 12, 2015
Rob meets a sassy woman named Amy. But people treat him weird when they're out.
11	"Every Man Is an Island"	April 22, 2015
Rob gets a chance to get out of town and relax, but maybe suburban living isn't all it's cracked up to be.
12	"Runnin Like Hell"	August 21, 2015
Rob has a bed bug scare, Shannon finds love, Dom settles down.

== Rob's Room ==
=== Season 1: 2012 ===
Episode 1: Dom Complains - Rob cleans his room while Dom complains.
Episode 2: Celebrity Impressions - Rob and Dom enjoy ramen and try out some impressions.
Episode 3: Memory Lane - Rob and Shannon hang out in Rob's room and Rob takes several trips down memory lane.
Episode 4: Puppet Playtime - Rob and Shannon hang out in Rob's room and Rob introduces Shannon to his puppet friends.
Episode 5: Home Workout - Dom shows Rob how to work out from home.
Episode 6: Sodastream - Rob and Shannon enjoy fresh seltzer from a Sodastream.

=== Season 2: 2013 ===
Episode 1: Nap Time - Rob takes a nap whilst his friend is over.
Episode 2: You Over-Instagram - Shannon drops the news on Rob that he over-Instagrams.
Episode 3: You Don't Watch Homeland? - Rob is distressed that his friend doesn't watch the TV series Homeland.
Episode 4: It'll Take a Second - Rob is trying to use the high tech stuff to watch a viral cat video.
Episode 5: Drama - Dom and Rob have drama.
Episode 6: I Have Psoriasis - Shannon e-diagnoses herself with psoriasis via WebMD.
Episode 7: Look, I'm a Hipster! - Rob gets a phone call and Dom is left alone in the room to snoop. The transformation is quick.
