= Jim Cummings (filmmaker) =

American filmmaker and actor (born 1986)

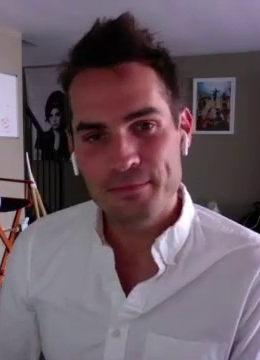
- Cummings in 2020
- Born: October 31, 1986 (age 40); New Orleans, Louisiana, U.S.
- Education: Emerson College (BFA)
- Occupations: Filmmaker; actor; composer
- Years active: 2009–present
- Awards: See below

Jim Cummings (born October 31, 1986) is an American filmmaker, actor, and composer. He is known for writing, directing and starring in the 2016 short film Thunder Road, which he extended into a 2018 feature film of the same name. He also wrote, directed and starred in The Wolf of Snow Hollow (2020), and The Beta Test (2021). He also starred in The Last Stop in Yuma County (2023).

== Early life and education ==
Cummings is from New Orleans. He graduated from Emerson College in Boston in 2009. He relocated to Los Angeles following a divorce and worked as a producer for CollegeHumor.

== Career ==
For his work in Thunder Road (2018), Cummings won the South by Southwest Grand Jury Award for Best Narrative Feature. He was also nominated for the 2018 Independent Spirit John Cassavetes Award for his work in Thunder Road.

In March 2024, it was announced that Cummings, along with PJ McCabe and Thomas Cross, launched an independent production studio named Cool & Happy Limited.

Cool & Happy's first production, an independent TV show titled The Screener will premiere at the 2026 edition of the Sundance Film Festival.

== Filmography ==
=== Feature films ===
Year	Film	Director	Writer	Producer	Editor	Notes
2010	No Floodwall Here	Yes	Yes	Yes	Yes	Feature directorial debut
2014	Confusion Through Sand	No	No	Yes	No	
2015	The Grief of Others	No	No	Yes	No	
2015	Krisha	No	No	Associate	No	
2015	13 Cameras	No	No	Yes	No	
2018	Thunder Road	Yes	Yes	No	Yes	Also composer
2020	Beast Beast	No	No	Yes	No	
2020	The Wolf of Snow Hollow	Yes	Yes	No	No	
2021	The Beta Test	Yes	Yes	No	Yes	Co-written / directed with PJ McCabe
2023	The Last Stop in Yuma County	No	No	Executive	No	

=== Short films ===
As a director

- Brothers (2009)
- The Flamingo (2012)
- Us Funny (2016)
- Call Your Father (2016)
- Thunder Road (2016)
- The Mountains of Mourne (2017)
- Hydrangea (2017)
- The Robbery (2017)
- It's All Right, It's Ok (2017)
- Is Now A Good Time? (2024)

As a producer

- The Last Brunch (2024)

=== Acting roles ===
Year	Film	Role	Notes
2014	This is Jay Calvin	Jay Calvin	Short film
2015	13 Cameras	Paul	
2016	Thunder Road	Jim Arnaud	Short film
2017	The Mountains of Mourne	Jim	Short film
2017	The Show About the Show	YouTube Commentator	
2017	Still Life	Jim	Series
2018	Thunder Road	Jim Arnaud	
2019	Greener Grass	Rob	
2020	The Wolf of Snow Hollow	John Marshall	
2020	The Block Island Sound	Dale	
2021	The Beta Test	Jordan Hines	
2021	Halloween Kills	Pete McCabe	
2023	Barry	Barry Berkman	Episode: "wow"
2023	The Last Stop in Yuma County	The Knife Salesman	
2025	The Righteous Gemstones	Captain Cane	Episode: "Prelude"
2025	Redux Redux	Jonathan	
2026	The Yeti	Booker	
2026	The Hawk	Clint Barkley	Episode: The Family That Plays Together
2026	The Further Mis-Adventures of Cliff Booth	Oliver Babcock	

== Awards and nominations ==
=== Film festival awards ===
Year	Festival	Film	Award	Result	Refs.
2014	USA Film Festival	Confusion Through Sand	Animation	1st Place	
2014	Indianapolis International Film Festival	Confusion Through Sand	American Spectrum Prize - Best Short	Won	
2016	Sundance Film Festival	Thunder Road	Grand Jury Prize - Short Film	Won	
2016	SXSW Film Festival	Thunder Road	Grand Jury Award for Narrative Short	Nominated	
2016	SXSW Film Festival	Thunder Road	Special Jury Award for Acting	Won	
2016	Provincetown International Film Festival	Thunder Road	Jury Award - Best Narrative Short	Won	
2016	Philadelphia Film Festival	Thunder Road	Jury Award - Best Short Film	Nominated	
2016	Palm Springs International ShortFest	Thunder Road	Special Jury Award	Won	
2016	Los Angeles Film Festival	Thunder Road	Jury Prize - Outstanding Performance	Won	
2016	HollyShorts Film Festival	Thunder Road	Best Short Narrative	Won	
2016	ÉCU Film Festival	Thunder Road	Festival Award - Non-European Shorts	Won	
2016	Chicago International Film Festival	Thunder Road	Audience Choice Award - Best Short Film	Won	
2016	Champs-Élysées Film Festival	Thunder Road	Best American Short Film	Won	
2016	Champs-Élysées Film Festival	Thunder Road	Audience Award	Won	
2016	Atlanta Film Festival	Thunder Road	Jury Award - Best Short Film	Won	
2016	Anchorage International Film Festival	Thunder Road	Best Short Film	Won	
2016	ShortList Film Festival	Thunder Road	Creators League Prize	Won	
2017	Sundance Film Festival	The Robbery	Grand Jury Prize - Short Film	Nominated	
2017	SXSW Film Festival	The Robbery	Grand Jury Award - Narrative Short	Nominated	
2017	Champs-Élysées Film Festival	The Robbery	Best American Short	Won	
2017	Anchorage International Film Festival	The Robbery	Best Super Short Film	Won	
2018	SXSW Film Festival	Thunder Road	Grand Jury Prize - Narrative Feature	Won	
2018	Sidewalk Film Festival	Thunder Road	Best Narrative Feature	Won	
2018	Seattle International Film Festival	Thunder Road	Grand Jury Prize - New American Cinema Competition	Won	
2018	Seattle International Film Festival	Thunder Road	Golden Space Needle Award- Best Actor	Nominated	
2018	Deauville American Film Festival	Thunder Road	Grand Prix	Won	
2018	Nashville Film Festival	Thunder Road	Grand Jury Prize - New Director	Won	
2018	Fayetteville Film Festival	Thunder Road	Best Narrative Feature	Won	
2018	Philadelphia Film Festival	Thunder Road	Archie Award- Best First Feature	Nominated	
2018	Munich Film Festival	Thunder Road	Best Film by an Emerging Director	Nominated	
2018	Buffalo International Film Festival	Thunder Road	Best Feature Narrative	Nominated	
2018	Athens Film Festival	Thunder Road	Best Picture	Nominated	
2018	Heartland Film Festival	Thunder Road	Grand Prize - Narrative Feature	Nominated	

Independent Spirit Awards

Year	Film	Award	Result	Notes
2019	Thunder Road	John Cassavetes Award	Nominated	Shared with Natalie Metzger, Zack Parker and Benjamin Weissner
