= Thunder Road (2018 film) =

2018 film by Jim Cummings

- Theatrical release poster
- Directed by: Jim Cummings
- Written by: Jim Cummings
- Based on: Thunder Road by Jim Cummings
- Produced by: Zack Parker; Natalie Metzger; Benjamin Wiessner; Mark Vashro
- Starring: Jim Cummings; Kendal Farr; Nican Robinson; Macon Blair; Jocelyn DeBoer; Chelsea Edmundson; Ammie Leonards; Bill Wise
- Cinematography: Lowell A. Meyer
- Edited by: Brian Vannucci; Jim Cummings
- Music by: Jim Cummings
- Production companies: The 10 East; Vanishing Angle
- Distributed by: Vanishing Angle
- Release dates: March 12, 2018 (SXSW); September 12, 2018 (France)
- Running time: 92 minutes
- Country: United States
- Language: English
- Budget: $200,000
- Box office: $448,184

Thunder Road is a 2018 American comedy-drama film directed, written by, and starring Jim Cummings, based on his 2016 short film. Cummings also served as co-editor, composer and visual effects artist. It also stars Kendal Farr, Nican Robinson, Macon Blair, Jocelyn DeBoer, Chelsea Edmunson, Ammie Leonards, and Bill Wise. It won the Grand Jury Award at the 2018 SXSW Film Festival.

The production began with a Kickstarter campaign. Unlike the short, the feature version is neither shot in nor edited to appear as a single long-take, but it does employ the use of the technique in select scenes.

== Plot ==
At his mother's funeral, police officer Jim Arnaud gives an awkward speech about her, and how she would sing the Bruce Springsteen song "Thunder Road" to him. Jim attempts to dance to the song, but his CD player malfunctions and he stumbles away in tears.

Jim is also going through a divorce with his unfaithful wife Rosalind, and is in a custody battle for their young daughter Crystal. After a work incident, the police captain sends Jim home where he spends his time off repairing a dance academy his mother used to run.

Jim attempts to bond with Crystal, redecorating her room and learning a game she learned at school. Jim takes Crystal to school, but becomes upset when he discovers makeup applied to her face. Jim receives divorce papers while at work, with Rosalind seeking full custody of Crystal and planning to move away so that Jim will not be able to see her.

During Jim's custody hearing, the judge accuses Jim of reckless behavior after a video of him dancing at the funeral is recovered and given to court, despite coworker Nate telling him he destroyed the person's phone. Jim loses the case.

Angered, Jim confronts Nate and pulls his gun from out of his holster without realizing it. Having witnessed this, the chief fires Jim.

Jim packs his things and goes to his sister's house. Jim's sister reveals that their mother had a severe knee injury while working on Swan Lake. Unable to admit to being in pain, their mother caused more harm to her body and had to quit her dance academy.

Jim leaves and speaks to his mother at her gravestone. On his way home, he is pulled over by a police officer and escorted to Rosalind's house. Rosalind has died from a drug overdose, with Crystal being the one to find her. Speaking to Rosalind’s corpse, Jim tells her he has never hated her more than he has in this moment. Jim then comforts his daughter in the ambulance.

Some time later, Jim and Crystal go to a performance of The Nutcracker, and Crystal is awe-struck by the show; Jim cries tears of joy.

== Cast ==
- Jim Cummings as Jim Arnaud
- Kendal Farr as Crystal Arnaud
- Nican Robinson as Nate Lewis
- Macon Blair as Dustin Zahn
- Jocelyn DeBoer as Rosalind Arnaud
- Chelsea Edmundson as Morgan Arnaud
- Ammie Leonards as Celia Lewis
- Bill Wise as Captain
- Jordan Fox as Doug
- Frank Mosley as Homeless Man
- Jacqueline Doke as Jocelyn
- Chris Doubek as Guy in a Nice Suit on a Bicycle
- Tristan Riggs as Tony
- Kevin Olliff as Chris

== Reception ==
=== Critical response ===
Review aggregator Rotten Tomatoes reports an approval rating of 96%, with an average rating of 7.7/10, based on 84 reviews. The site's critical consensus reads: "Thunder Road deftly balances emotionally affecting drama against bruising comedy - and serves as an outstanding calling card for writer-director-star Jim Cummings." According to Metacritic, which sampled 17 critics and calculated a weighted average score of 79 out of 100, the film received "generally favorable reviews".

Owen Gleiberman of Variety wrote "This is one of the first dramas to dig deep into America's heartland crisis — the crush of the spirit that has emerged from a collapsing job market and drug addiction and the underlying loss of faith. In Thunder Road, Cummings creates an indelible character who is all tangled up in that disaster, but with a stubbornness that turns into something like valor, he wriggles free of it. He saves himself by becoming a human being. It's a relief to stop laughing at him, only to realize that you may want to cry for him." Alex Godfrey of Empire gave the film 4 stars out of 5, saying "Thunder Road is a tour de force turn from its creator, who delivers an unpredictable performance we've never quite seen before. Sat in the cinema, too close for comfort, you can't escape him, and, amazingly, you don't really want to. It is cringingly, rewardingly intimate."

David Fear of Rolling Stone called the film "an instant classic," saying "On paper, Thunder Road sounds like a hard sell — so we're supposed to sympathize with some God's Lonely Man type with unresolved anger issues, much less a possibly violent one with a badge? But Cummings lets you see how this fractured guy, someone who's trying to untangle a legacy of wrong turns and emotional instability, is trying to achieve some sort of peace and clarity through all of his clouded, fucked-up feelings as well."

Lisa Nesselson of France 24 stated "The vast majority of the people around me genuinely liked the movie, and I just didn't get why they were so enthusiastic...it lent itself to me checking my watch regularly" and found the main character "way more annoying that touching" although she added she knew people who compared him favorably to Jerry Lewis.

In his mixed review film critic Mark Kermode of The Guardian wrote, "Occasionally the film itself suffers from a similar solipsism, although perhaps that’s to be expected from a movie that is “written, directed and performed by” its one-man-show-maker...Yet there are times when [the film] comes perilously close to embracing [the lead's] aggrieved worldview, particularly in relation to his marriage, which forms the narrative’s most dubious (and clumsily contrived) thread."

=== Accolades ===
Award	Year	Category	Recipient	Result	Ref.
South By Southwest	2018	SXSW Grand Jury Prize - Narrative Feature	Thunder Road	Won	
Sidewalk Film Festival	2018	Best Narrative Feature	Thunder Road	Won	
Seattle International Film Festival	2018	Grand Jury Prize - New American Cinema Competition	Thunder Road	Won	
Seattle International Film Festival	2018	Golden Space Needle Award- Best Actor	Jim Cummings	Nominated	
Deauville American Film Festival	2018	Grand Prix	Thunder Road	Won	
Nashville Film Festival	2018	Grand Jury Prize - New Director	Thunder Road	Won	
Fayetteville Film Festival	2018	Best Narrative Feature	Thunder Road	Won	
Philadelphia Film Festival	2018	Archie Award- Best First Feature	Jim Cummings	Nominated	
Munich Film Festival	2018	Best Film by an Emerging Director	Thunder Road	Nominated	
Buffalo International Film Festival	2018	Best Feature Narrative	Thunder Road	Nominated	
Athens International Film Festival	2018	International Competition	Thunder Road	Nominated	
Independent Spirit Awards	2019	John Cassavetes Award	Jim Cummings, Natalie Metzger, Zack Parker and Benjamin Weissner	Nominated	
