= The Beta Test =

- Theatrical release poster
- Directed by: Jim Cummings; PJ McCabe
- Written by: Jim Cummings; PJ McCabe
- Produced by: Natalie Metzger; Matt Miller; Benjamin Wiessner
- Starring: Jim Cummings; PJ McCabe; Virginia Newcomb; Jessie Barr
- Cinematography: Kenneth Wales
- Edited by: Jim Cummings
- Music by: Ben Lovett
- Production companies: Vanishing Angle; DiffeRant Productions; Sons of Rigor Films
- Distributed by: IFC Films (United States); Blue Finch Film Releasing (United Kingdom)
- Release dates: March 1, 2021 (Berlinale); October 15, 2021 (United Kingdom); November 5, 2021 (United States)
- Running time: 93 minutes
- Countries: United States; United Kingdom
- Language: English
- Budget: $250,000
- Box office: $37,539

The Beta Test is a 2021 black comedy thriller film written and directed by Jim Cummings and PJ McCabe. It follows a talent agent whose life is turned upside-down after taking part in a secret sex pact; Cummings and McCabe star alongside Virginia Newcomb and Jessie Barr.

The film premiered at the Berlin International Film Festival on March 1, 2021, and was released in the United States on November 5, 2021. It received positive reviews from critics.

== Plot ==
In Los Angeles, California, a distressed Swedish woman calls 911 to report a domestic dispute. She then confesses to her wealthy husband that she recently received a purple invitation to an anonymous sexual encounter. She says that she accepted the offer and realized she's not happy in her marriage; she wants to leave him and asks for only $5,000 instead of half of his money. The husband stabs her repeatedly and throws her off a balcony.

After this prologue, Jordan Hines is introduced: a smooth-talking, hard-driving Hollywood agent with an ulcer who is five years sober and under constant stress at work. Although six weeks away from marrying his fiancée, Caroline Gaines, he constantly finds himself distracted by attractive women. He receives a purple envelope with an anonymous invitation to a no-strings-attached encounter at a hotel and a form to fill out about his sexual interests. He discards the letter but later retrieves it from a dumpster and fills out the invitation. After meeting with a potential, high-profile Chinese client named Raymond, who berates him for his agency's practices being obsolete and phony, Jordan receives a second purple envelope with a hotel room keycard. He goes to the hotel room, puts on a blindfold, and has fabulous sex with an anonymous woman who is also blindfolded.

Jordan obsessively investigates the source of the anonymous invitation and the identity of the woman. Raymond has also accepted a similar invitation with another man, but his wife shoots and kills him, and the wife of the man he slept with later poisons him and herself. Jordan tracks down the man delivering the anonymous invitations, whose bag is filled with purple envelopes. Jordan investigates one of the addresses and finds the addressee is dead. Jordan's friend PJ theorizes that someone with access to people's social media data, such as recent engagements, websites visited, and liked photos, could then have found the addresses of wealthy people who fit certain demographics and sent them letters to connect them for anonymous sex. He suggests it would be inexpensive to set up and potentially very lucrative.

Jordan and Caroline, having drifted apart as his secret becomes an obsession and his behavior becomes obnoxious, go to a cabin for a weekend to reconnect. However, he continues to reject her suggestions that there is something wrong with him. That night, she leads him into passionate sex.

Jordan and Caroline stop at a coffee shop, where he recognizes the woman he slept with. She seems to recognize him at first but claims not to understand an onslaught of embarrassing questions. The encounter disturbs Caroline, who drives away without Jordan.

Impersonating a federal agent, Jordan interviews the people who printed the purple envelopes. He tracks down and uses a hammer to attack the man behind the letters, who calls himself Johnny Paypal. Johnny confesses to sending them, based on addresses from the 2014 Sony Pictures hack and further social media scrubbing, to match people with their perfect sexual partners. Johnny realizes that Jordan never received a third letter, which asked for a $5,000 wire transfer in exchange for the identity of the woman he had sex with. He mocks the now-shaken Jordan for being a nobody, initiates a computer program to send out hundreds of thousands of new letters that will generate hundreds of millions of dollars, and insists he will never reveal Jordan's perfect match. Unnerved, Jordan flees.

In their garage, Caroline catches Jordan preparing to burn the evidence of his hotel encounter. He breaks down and confesses not only to infidelity, but also to drinking, smoking, committing crimes, living a lie, and being a fraud. He accepts that Caroline is going to kill him with the scissors she's holding, but she forgives him, as she also received the anonymous letters.

Jordan and Caroline escape together and drive toward the Mexican border. At a diner, she tells him that other people are going to do everything they can to trip the two of them up, but that they can't let those people win. She then reads news that eight more people have been killed. Before they leave, their attractive waitress writes her name and number on the bill she hands to Jordan.

== Cast ==
- Jim Cummings as Jordan Hines
- Virginia Newcomb as Caroline Gaines
- PJ McCabe as PJ Pruitt
- Jessie Barr as Lauren
- Kevin Changaris as Johnny Paypal
- Olivia Grace Applegate as the hotel and café stranger
- Christian Hillborg as Kris Borgli
- Malin Barr as Annie Borgli
- Jacqueline Doke as Jaclyn
- Wilky Lau as Raymond Lee

== Production ==
Filming wrapped in December 2019 and post-production was done remotely throughout 2020 due to the COVID-19 pandemic.

== Release ==
The film premiered at the 71st Berlin International Film Festival. IFC Films acquired U.S. distribution rights in March 2021 and set it for a November 5, 2021 wide release in the United States. It had its North American premiere at the 20th Tribeca Film Festival on June 11, 2021, in the Viewpoints section. Blue Finch Film Releasing released the film in the United Kingdom on October 15.

It was invited to screen at the 25th Bucheon International Fantastic Film Festival, in July 2021, competing in Bucheon Choice Features section.

== Reception ==
On Rotten Tomatoes the film holds an approval rating of 92% based on 87 reviews, with an average rating of 7/10. The site's critics' consensus reads: "A darkly amusing thriller that discomfits as it entertains, The Beta Test satirizes Hollywood with savage flair." According to Metacritic, which sampled 18 critics and calculated a weighted average score of 72 out of 100, the film received "generally favorable" reviews.

Owen Gleiberman of Variety wrote that "The film's elements don't mesh as seamlessly as they should have", and added that the film "is almost too ambitious, tucking a surfeit of ideas into its heightened surrealist mindscape. Yet the movie, at its best, can hold you in its grip."

== Awards & Nominations ==
Award	Year	Category	Recipient	Result	Ref.
Berlin International Film Festival	2021	Encounters Award	PJ McCabe, Jim Cummings	Nominated	
Eastern Oregon Film Festival	2021	Best Feature Narrative	Jim Cummings	Nominated	
Festival Europeen du Film Fantastique de Strasbourg (FEFFS)	2021	Crossovers Prize	PJ McCabe, Jim Cummings	Nominated	
Festival International du Film Independant de Bordeaux (Fifib)	2021	Grand Prize of the Jury Best Film	PJ McCabe, Jim Cummings	Nominated	
Nashville Film Festival	2021	Grand Jury Prize Best Graveyard Shift Feature	PJ McCabe, Jim Cummings	Nominated	
