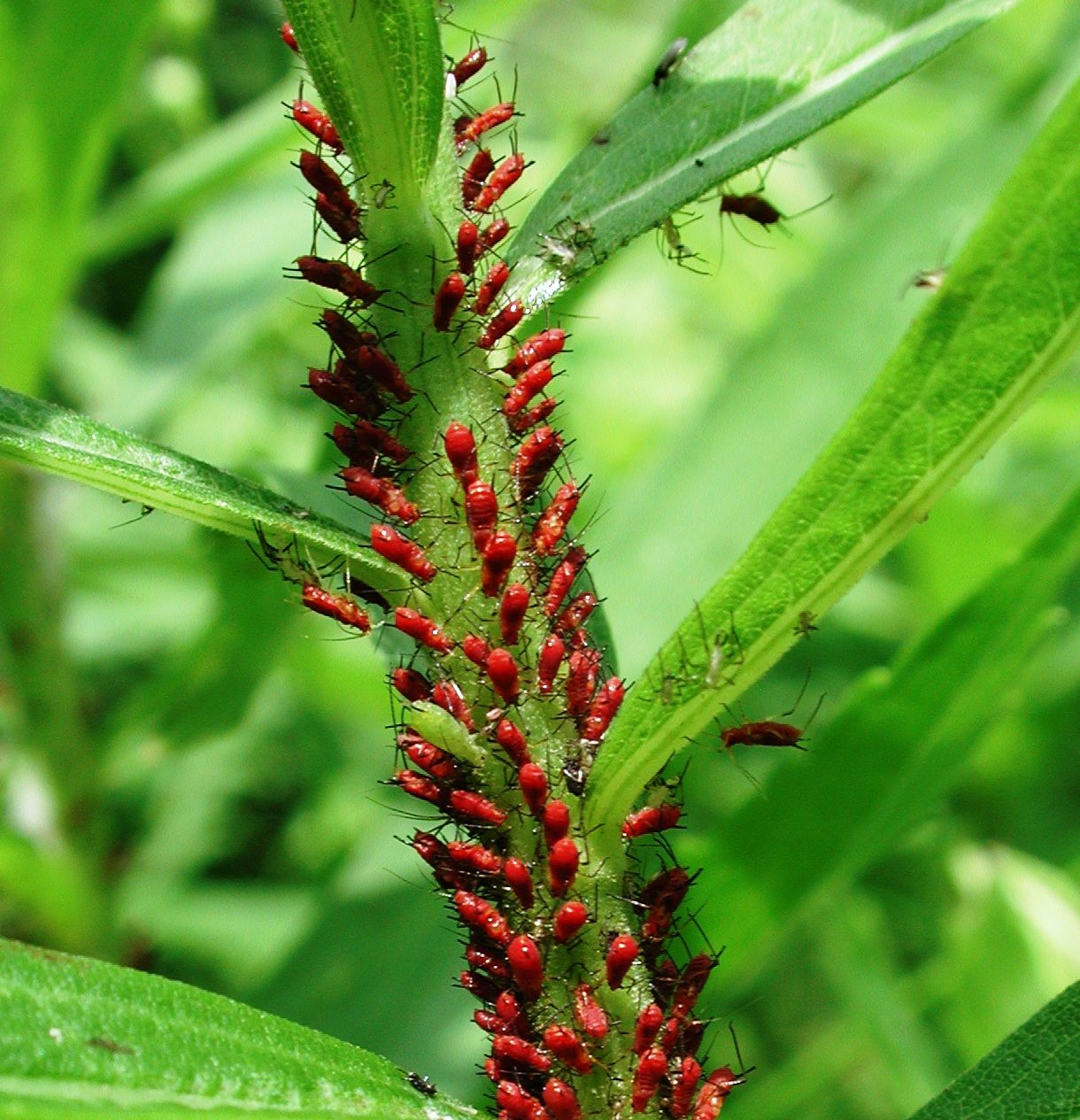

Scientific classification
- Domain: Eukaryota
- Kingdom: Animalia
- Phylum: Arthropoda
- Class: Insecta
- Order: Hemiptera
- Suborder: Sternorrhyncha
- Family: Aphididae
- Genus: Uroleucon
- Species: U. nigrotuberculatum

Binomial name
- Uroleucon nigrotuberculatum (Olive, 1963)

= Uroleucon nigrotuberculatum =

Species of true bug

Uroleucon nigrotuberculatum, the red goldenrod aphid, is a species of aphid in the family Aphididae. It is native to North America, but has been introduced to Japan. Host plants include goldenrods as well as Taraxacum officinale, Sonchus asper, and Senecio vulgaris.
