= Uroleucon pseudambrosiae =

Scientific classification
- Domain: Eukaryota
- Kingdom: Animalia
- Phylum: Arthropoda
- Class: Insecta
- Order: Hemiptera
- Suborder: Sternorrhyncha
- Family: Aphididae
- Genus: Uroleucon
- Species: U. pseudambrosiae

Binomial name
- Uroleucon pseudambrosiae (Olive, 1963)

Species of true bug

Uroleucon pseudambrosiae is a species of aphid in the family Aphididae.

It feeds on wild lettuce (Lactuca spp.), pilewort (Erechtites hieracifolia), dandelion (Taraxacum), and Sonchus asper. It is found in North America. It can serve as a vector for watermelon mosaic virus.
