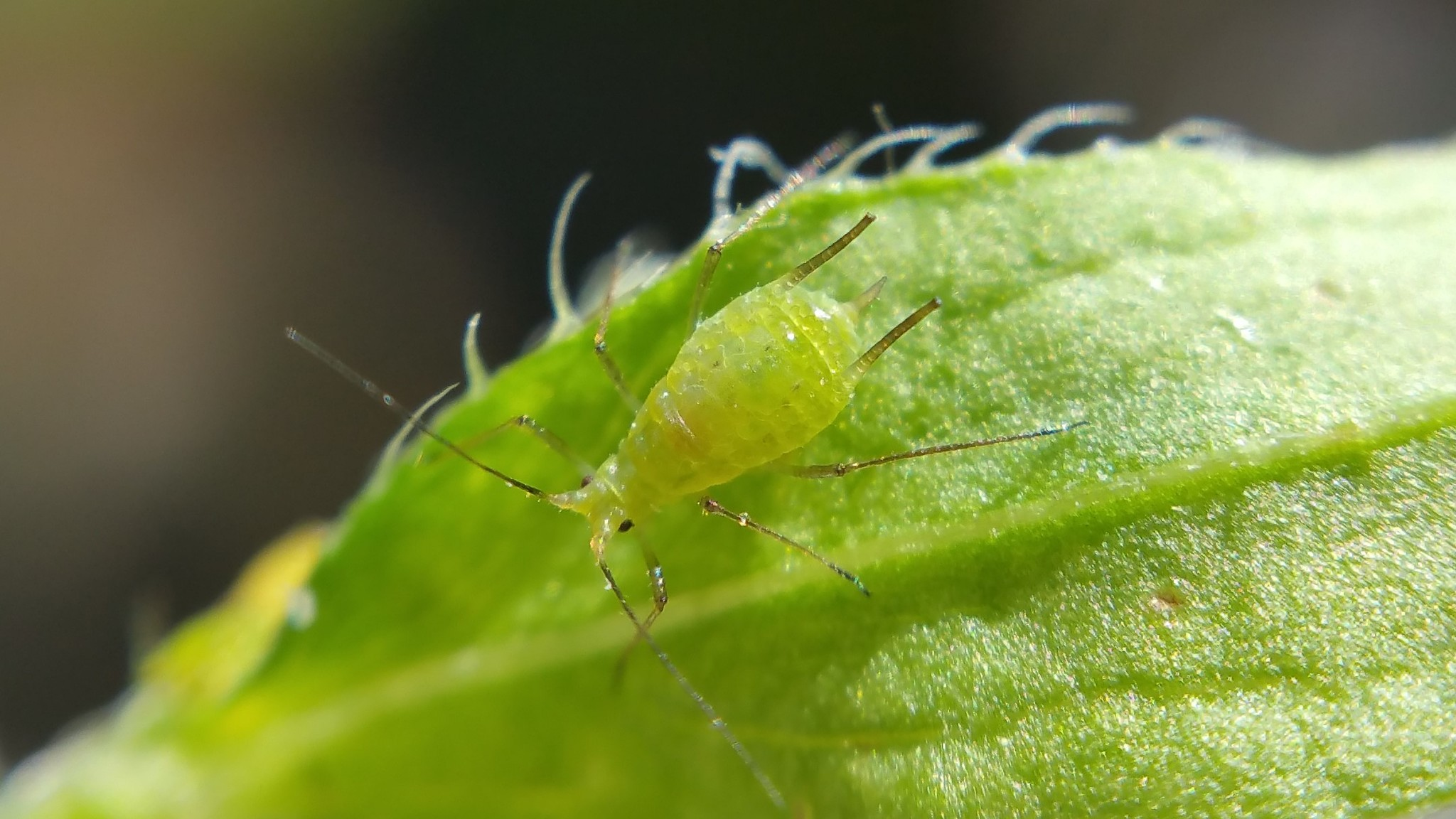
- On Erigeron annuus

Scientific classification
- Domain: Eukaryota
- Kingdom: Animalia
- Phylum: Arthropoda
- Class: Insecta
- Order: Hemiptera
- Suborder: Sternorrhyncha
- Family: Aphididae
- Genus: Uroleucon
- Species: U. erigeronense

Binomial name
- Uroleucon erigeronense (Thomas, 1878)

Synonyms
- Dactynotus erigeronella (Soliman, 1927); Dactynotus erigeronense (Thomas, 1878); Dactynotus erigeronensis (Thomas, 1878); Macrosiphum erigeronella (Soliman, 1927); Macrosiphum erigeronensis (Thomas, 1878); Microparsus erigeronensis (Thomas, 1878); Nectarophora erigeronensis (Thomas, 1878); Siphonophora erigeronensis (Thomas, 1878); Tritogenaphis erigeronensis (Thomas, 1878); Tritogenaphis escalantii (Knowlton, 1928); Uroleucon erigeronensis (Thomas, 1878)

= Uroleucon erigeronense =

Species of true bug

Uroleucon erigeronense, described by Thomas (1878), is a species of aphid that feeds on plants of the Erigeron or fleabane genus. It also feeds on other plants, including Eriophyllum.

== Biology and Distribution ==
Uroleucon erigeronense is holocyclic in northern climates, producing alate males and sexual females in autumn. In warmer regions, such as the southern United States, it can reproduce anholocyclically. It inhabits a wide range of host plants within the Asteraceae family, moving seasonally from overwintering perennial hosts like Ericameria and Chrysothamnus to blooming annuals and herbs in spring and summer. This pattern resembles heteroecy, although the species does not exhibit strict obligate host alternation.

== Host Plants ==
Documented hosts include numerous genera in the Asteraceae family, such as:

- Achillea, Artemisia, Aster, Baccharis, Balsamorhiza, Brickellia, Centaurea, Chrysothamnus, Conyza, Crepis, Ericameria, Erigeron, Gutierrezia, Machaeranthera, Tetradymia, and Tragopogon.
