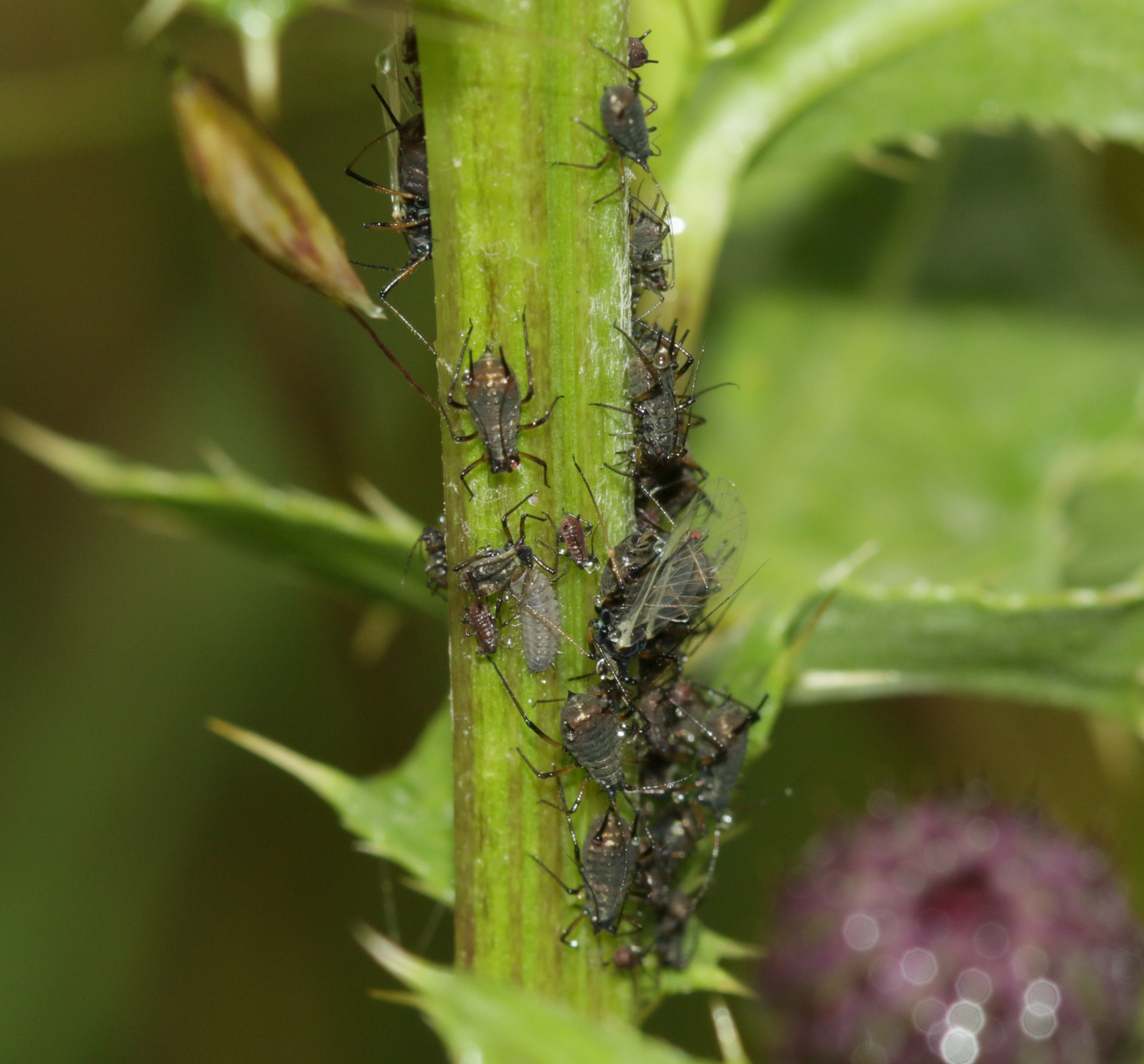

Scientific classification
- Kingdom: Animalia
- Phylum: Arthropoda
- Class: Insecta
- Order: Hemiptera
- Suborder: Sternorrhyncha
- Family: Aphididae
- Genus: Uroleucon
- Species: U. cirsii

Binomial name
- Uroleucon cirsii (Linnaeus, 1758)

= Uroleucon cirsii =

Species of true bug

Uroleucon cirsii, the large thistle aphid, is a species of aphid in the family Aphididae.

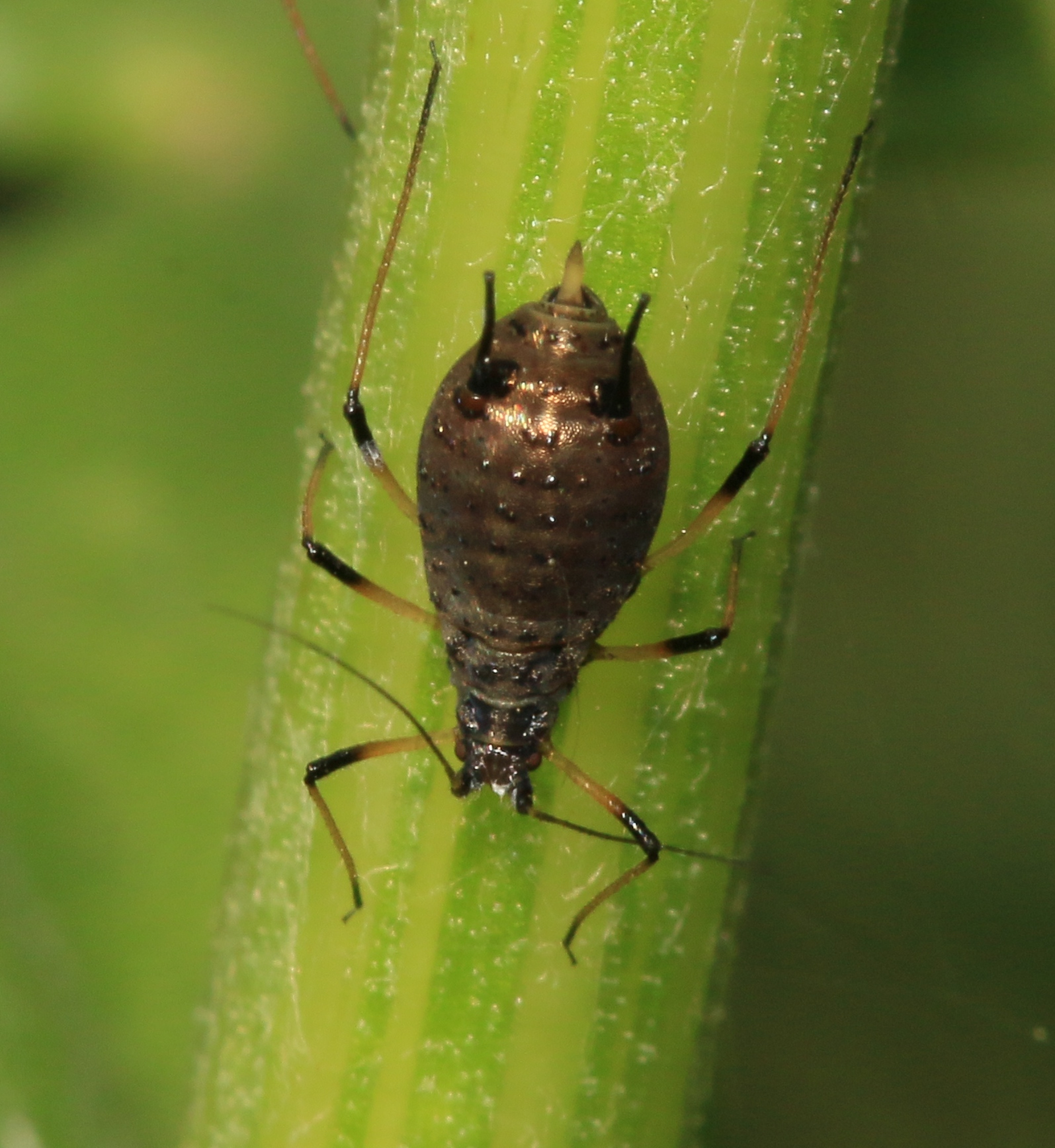
Large thistle aphid, Uroleucon cirsii
