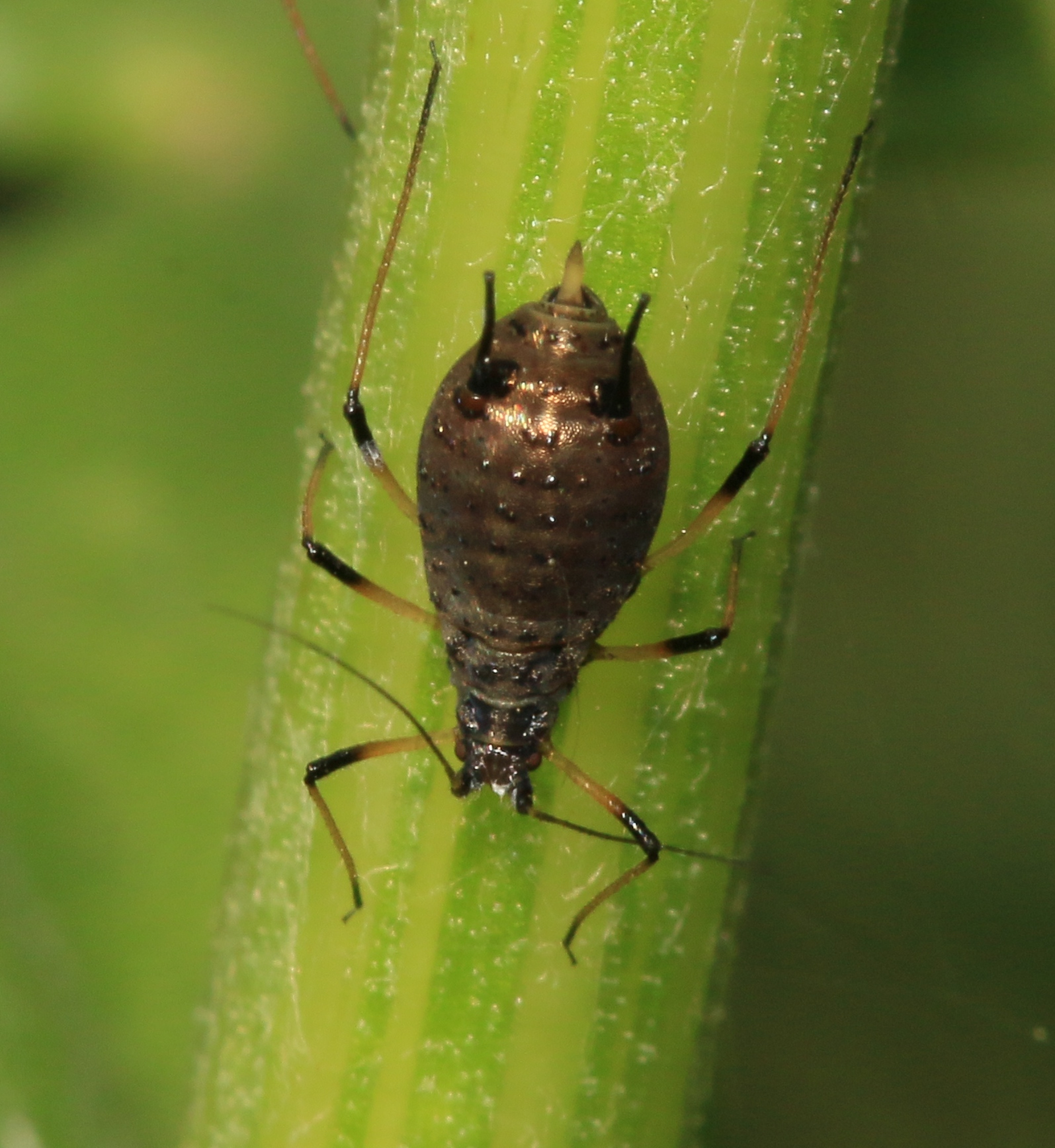

Scientific classification
- Kingdom: Animalia
- Phylum: Arthropoda
- Class: Insecta
- Order: Hemiptera
- Suborder: Sternorrhyncha
- Family: Aphididae
- Subfamily: Aphidinae
- Tribe: Macrosiphini
- Genus: Uroleucon; Mordvilko, 1914

Species
- See text

= Uroleucon =

Genus of true bugs

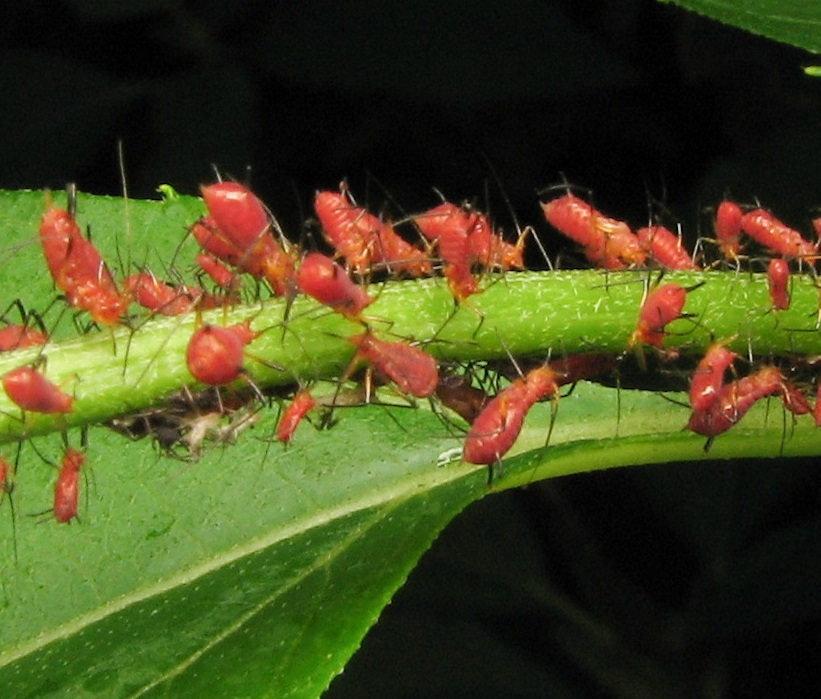
Uroleucon obscuricaudatum on oxeye (Heliopsis helianthoides)

Uroleucon is a genus of aphids in the family Aphididae. Most species feed on Asteraceae.

== Species ==
Listed alphabetically within subgenera.

- Subgenus Belochilum:
  - Uroleucon inulae
- Subgenus Lambersius:
  - Uroleucon anomalae
  - Uroleucon bradburyi
  - Uroleucon breviscriptum
  - Uroleucon brevitarsus
  - Uroleucon cadens
  - Uroleucon caligatum
  - Uroleucon canadense
  - Uroleucon coloradense
  - Uroleucon crepusisiphon
  - Uroleucon erigeronense
  - Uroleucon gravicorne
  - Uroleucon idahoensis
  - Uroleucon longirostre
  - Uroleucon luteolum
  - Uroleucon macgillivrayae
  - Uroleucon madia
  - Uroleucon manitobense
  - Uroleucon nevadense
  - Uroleucon nodulum
  - Uroleucon penderum
  - Uroleucon queretarense
  - Uroleucon remaudiereorum
  - Uroleucon richardsi
  - Uroleucon suzannae
  - Uroleucon tenuitarsum
  - Uroleucon vera
  - Uroleucon zacatecense
  - Uroleucon zayasi
  - Uroleucon zerogutierrezis
  - Uroleucon zymozionense
- Subgenus Satula:
  - Uroleucon brachychaetum
- Subgenus Uroleucon:
  - Uroleucon achilleae
  - Uroleucon adenocaulonae
  - Uroleucon adesmiae
  - Uroleucon alaskense
  - Uroleucon ambiguum
  - Uroleucon ambrosiae – brown ambrosia aphid
  - Uroleucon arnesense
  - Uroleucon asteriae
  - Uroleucon asteromyzon
  - Uroleucon asterophagum
  - Uroleucon astronomus
  - Uroleucon atripes
  - Uroleucon bereticum
  - Uroleucon bicolor
  - Uroleucon bielawskii
  - Uroleucon bifrontis
  - Uroleucon boreale
  - Uroleucon brevirostre
  - Uroleucon brevisiphon
  - Uroleucon budhium
  - Uroleucon bulgaricum
  - Uroleucon carberriense
  - Uroleucon caspicum
  - Uroleucon chani
  - Uroleucon chilense
  - Uroleucon chondrillae
  - Uroleucon chrysanthemi
  - Uroleucon chrysopsidicola
  - Uroleucon cicerbitae
  - Uroleucon cichorii
  - Uroleucon ciefi
  - Uroleucon cirsicola
  - Uroleucon cirsii – large thistle aphid
  - Uroleucon dalmaticum
  - Uroleucon debile
  - Uroleucon deltense
  - Uroleucon doellingeriae
  - Uroleucon dubium
  - Uroleucon elbursicum
  - Uroleucon elephantopicola
  - Uroleucon epilobii
  - Uroleucon essigi
  - Uroleucon eumadiae
  - Uroleucon eupatoricolens
  - Uroleucon fagopyri
  - Uroleucon floricola
  - Uroleucon formosanum
  - Uroleucon fuchuense
  - Uroleucon fuscaudatum
  - Uroleucon garnicai
  - Uroleucon gigantiphagum
  - Uroleucon gnaphalii
  - Uroleucon gochnatiae
  - Uroleucon gredinae
  - Uroleucon grossum
  - Uroleucon hasanicum
  - Uroleucon heterothecae
  - Uroleucon hieracicola
  - Uroleucon hymenocephali
  - Uroleucon hypochoeridis
  - Uroleucon hyssopii
  - Uroleucon impatiensicolens
  - Uroleucon inulicola
  - Uroleucon iranicum
  - Uroleucon ivae
  - Uroleucon jaceicola
  - Uroleucon kamtshaticum
  - Uroleucon kashmiricum
  - Uroleucon katonkae
  - Uroleucon kikioense
  - Uroleucon kumaoni
  - Uroleucon lactucicola
  - Uroleucon lanceolatum
  - Uroleucon leonardi
  - Uroleucon leontodontis
  - Uroleucon leontopodiicola
  - Uroleucon longisetosum
  - Uroleucon macolai
  - Uroleucon malarguense
  - Uroleucon martini
  - Uroleucon maximilianicola
  - Uroleucon mendocinum
  - Uroleucon mexicanum
  - Uroleucon mierae
  - Uroleucon mongolicum
  - Uroleucon monticola
  - Uroleucon mulgedii
  - Uroleucon murale
  - Uroleucon nigrotibium
  - Uroleucon nigrotuberculatum – red goldenrod aphid
  - Uroleucon obscuricaudatum
  - Uroleucon obscurum
  - Uroleucon ochropus
  - Uroleucon olivei
  - Uroleucon patagonicum
  - Uroleucon paucosensoriatum
  - Uroleucon payuniense
  - Uroleucon penae
  - Uroleucon pepperi
  - Uroleucon picridiphagum
  - Uroleucon picridis
  - Uroleucon pieloui
  - Uroleucon pilosellae
  - Uroleucon pseudambrosiae
  - Uroleucon pseudobscurum
  - Uroleucon pseudomuermosum
  - Uroleucon pseudotanaceti
  - Uroleucon ptarmicae
  - Uroleucon pulicariae
  - Uroleucon pyrethri
  - Uroleucon reynoldense
  - Uroleucon riojanum
  - Uroleucon rudbeckiae – goldenglow aphid
  - Uroleucon russellae
  - Uroleucon saussureae
  - Uroleucon sijpkensi
  - Uroleucon simlaense
  - Uroleucon sinuense
  - Uroleucon skurichinae
  - Uroleucon solirostratum
  - Uroleucon sonchellum
  - Uroleucon sonchi
  - Uroleucon stoetzelae
  - Uroleucon tanaceti
  - Uroleucon tardae
  - Uroleucon teheranense
  - Uroleucon telekiae
  - Uroleucon tessariae
  - Uroleucon tortuosissimae
  - Uroleucon tucumani
  - Uroleucon tussilaginis
  - Uroleucon ussuriense
  - Uroleucon vancouverense
  - Uroleucon vernonicola
  - Uroleucon zinzalae
- Subgenus Uromelan:
  - Uroleucon acroptilidis
  - Uroleucon adenophorae
  - Uroleucon aeneum
  - Uroleucon amamianum
  - Uroleucon ariegense
  - Uroleucon bonitum
  - Uroleucon calendulae
  - Uroleucon campanulae
  - Uroleucon carlinae
  - Uroleucon carthami
  - Uroleucon cephalonopli
  - Uroleucon compositae
  - Uroleucon doronici
  - Uroleucon dzhungaricum
  - Uroleucon echinatum
  - Uroleucon ensifoliae
  - Uroleucon eoessigi
  - Uroleucon eupatorifoliae
  - Uroleucon giganteum
  - Uroleucon gobonis
  - Uroleucon helenae
  - Uroleucon helianthicola
  - Uroleucon helichrysi
  - Uroleucon hieracioides
  - Uroleucon illini
  - Uroleucon jaceae
  - Uroleucon macrosiphon
  - Uroleucon minor
  - Uroleucon minosmartelli
  - Uroleucon minutum
  - Uroleucon montanivorum
  - Uroleucon neocampanulae
  - Uroleucon nigrocampanulae
  - Uroleucon omeishanense
  - Uroleucon orientale
  - Uroleucon pachysiphon
  - Uroleucon parvotuberculatum
  - Uroleucon phyteumae
  - Uroleucon rapunculoidis
  - Uroleucon riparium
  - Uroleucon rurale
  - Uroleucon scorzonerae
  - Uroleucon scrophulariae
  - Uroleucon seneciocola
  - Uroleucon siculum
  - Uroleucon sileneobium
  - Uroleucon simile
  - Uroleucon solidaginis
  - Uroleucon stachydis
  - Uroleucon syrdariense
  - Uroleucon taraxaci
  - Uroleucon tripartitum
  - Uroleucon triphylli
  - Uroleucon tschuense
  - Uroleucon tuataiae
  - Uroleucon uyguricum
  - Uroleucon verbesinae
  - Uroleucon vernoniae
