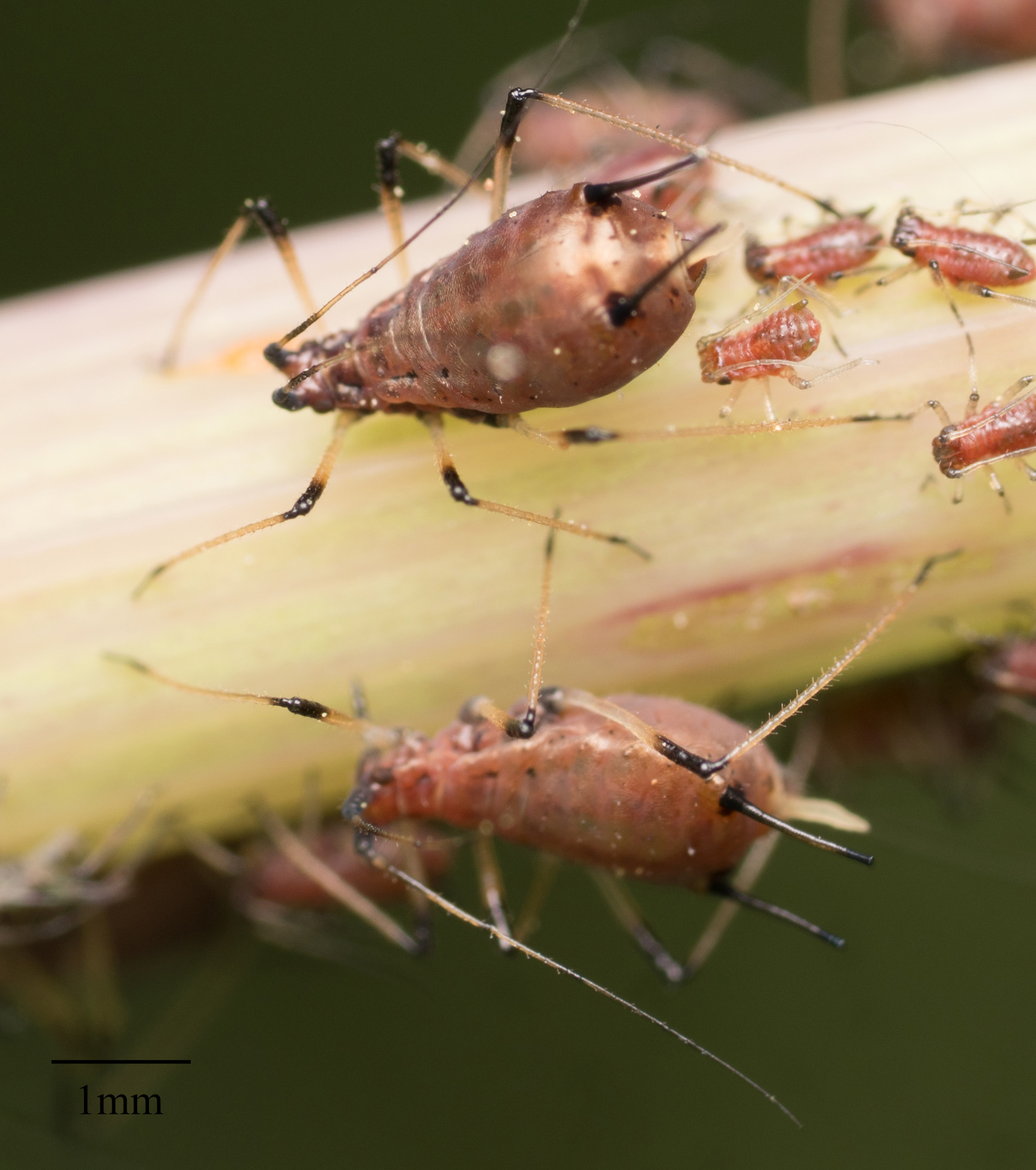

Scientific classification
- Kingdom: Animalia
- Phylum: Arthropoda
- Class: Insecta
- Order: Hemiptera
- Suborder: Sternorrhyncha
- Family: Aphididae
- Genus: Uroleucon
- Species: U. sonchi

Binomial name
- Uroleucon sonchi (Linnaeus, 1767)

= Uroleucon sonchi =

Species of true bug

Uroleucon sonchi is a species of aphid in the family Aphididae. Known as the large sow-thistle aphid, it is a native of Europe, and has been introduced to several other countries. It principally feeds on the sow thistle (Sonchus sp.) but is also a pest of cultivated lettuce, and so is also known as the brown lettuce aphid.

== Distribution ==
Uroleucon sonchi is native to the Palaearctic region, but is now found in North and South America, the Middle East, Yemen, Africa, India, Japan, China, Korea, New Zealand, and (since 1995) Australia.

== Ecology ==
This species feeds on many plants in the Asteraceae, mostly the tribe Lactuceae: sow-thistle (Sonchus oleraceus) and other Sonchus species, lettuce and other Lactuca species, endive, Emilia sonchifolia, Geropogon glabrum, and Picris hieracioides.

== Parasites ==
The parasite Aphidius sonchi, ostensibly a specialised parasite of Hyperomyzus lactucae, has been reared occasionally from U. sonchi.

== Subspecies ==
These three subspecies belong to the species Uroleucon sonchi:

- Uroleucon sonchi afghanicum (Narzikulov & Umarov, 1972)
- Uroleucon sonchi sonchi (Linnaeus, 1767)
- Uroleucon sonchi stepposa
