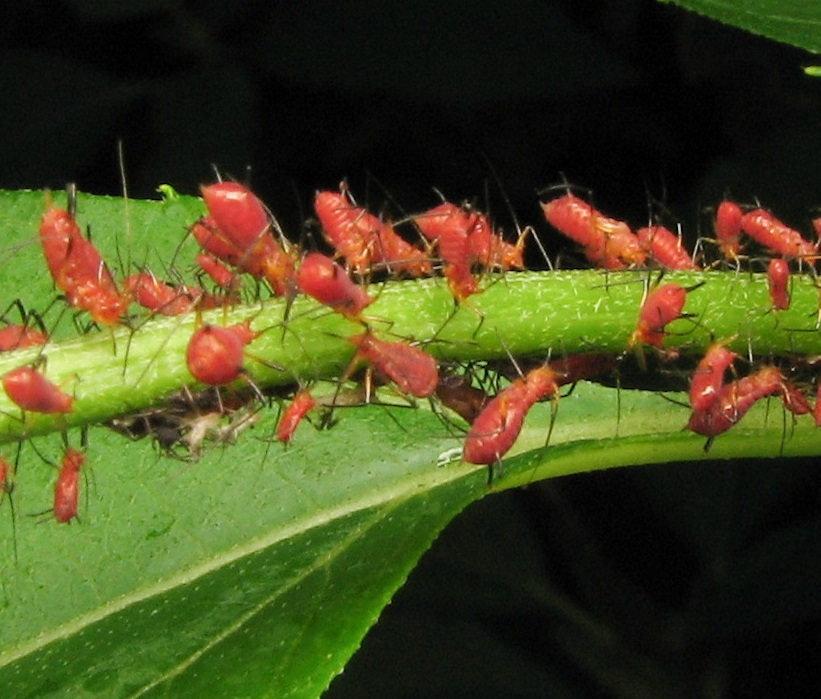
- Uroleucon obscuricaudatum adult

Scientific classification
- Kingdom: Animalia
- Phylum: Arthropoda
- Class: Insecta
- Order: Hemiptera
- Suborder: Sternorrhyncha
- Family: Aphididae
- Genus: Uroleucon
- Species: U. obscuricaudatum

Binomial name
- Uroleucon obscuricaudatum Olive, 1965

Synonyms
- Dactynotus obscuricaudatus Olive, 1965

= Uroleucon obscuricaudatum =

Species of aphid

Uroleucon obscuricaudatum is a species of aphid in the family Aphididae. It can be found in North America and feeds on Heliopsis helianthoides.
