= Uroleucon minutum =

Scientific classification
- Kingdom: Animalia
- Phylum: Arthropoda
- Class: Insecta
- Order: Hemiptera
- Suborder: Sternorrhyncha
- Family: Aphididae
- Genus: Uroleucon
- Species: U. minutum

Binomial name
- Uroleucon minutum (van der Goot, 1918)

Species of true bug

Uroleucon minutum is an aphid in the order Hemiptera. It is a true bug and sucks sap from plants.
