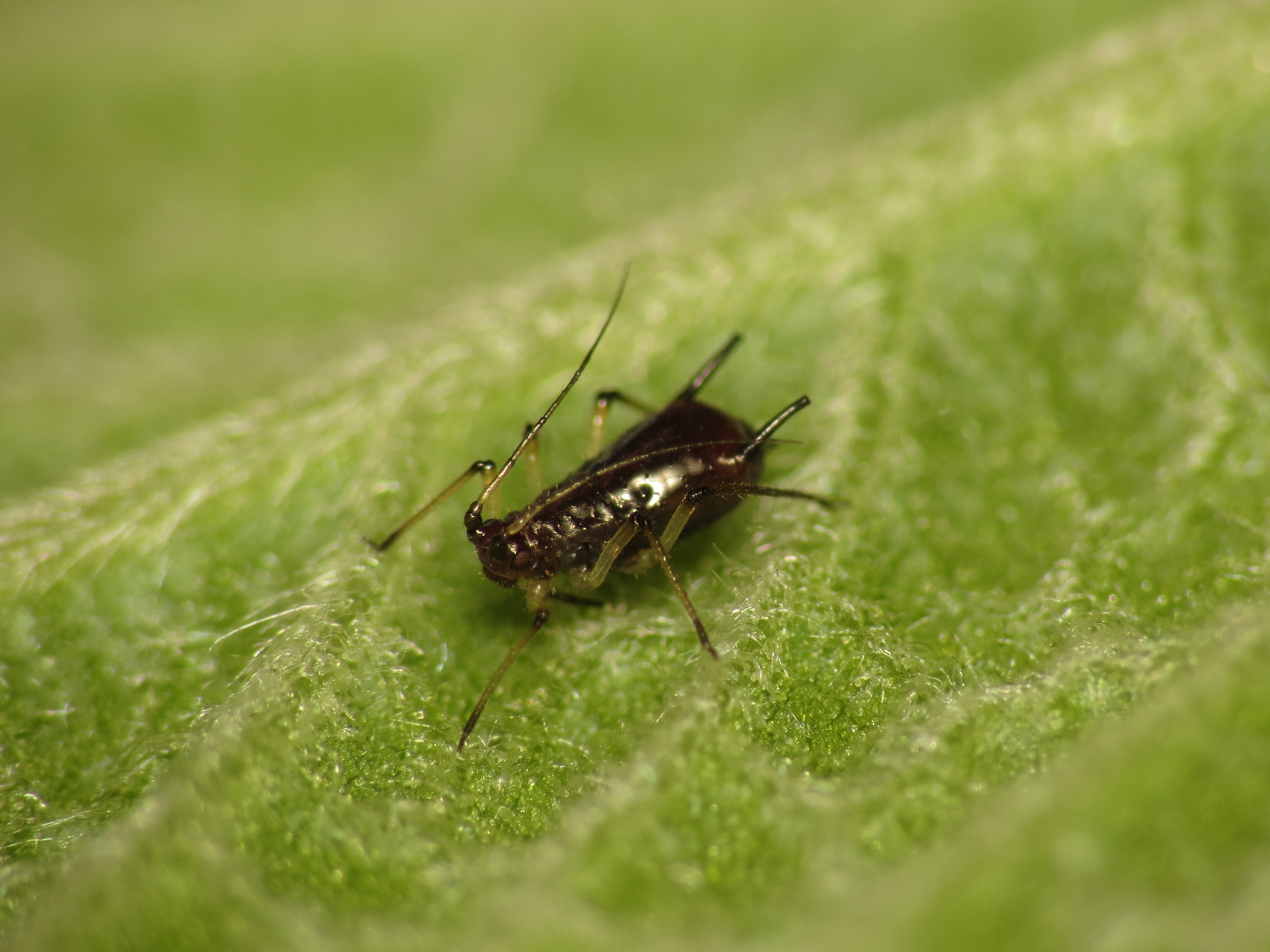

Scientific classification
- Domain: Eukaryota
- Kingdom: Animalia
- Phylum: Arthropoda
- Class: Insecta
- Order: Hemiptera
- Suborder: Sternorrhyncha
- Family: Aphididae
- Genus: Uroleucon
- Species: U. telekiae

Binomial name
- Uroleucon telekiae Holman, 1965

= Uroleucon telekiae =

Species of aphid

Uroleucon telekiae is a species of aphid from the family Aphididae.

== Description ==
Uroleucon telekiae can be found in colours ranging from reddish black to dark bronze. The first tarsal segment possesses three hairs. The apical segment of the rostrum is 1.55 - 1.66 x the second segment of hind tarsus. The middle parts of the tibiae is pale or dusky in colour. The body is usually longer than 3.5mm. The secondary rhinaria rarely covers more than 40% of the antennal segment.

== Distribution and habitat ==
Uroleucon telekiae can be found throughout many parts of Europe, including the countries of: Denmark, Czech Republic, Germany, North Macedonia, Poland, Romania, Slovakia and Luxembourg.

This species is monophagous and can only be found feeding on the plant species Telekia speciosa. It is therefore only present in countries where its food plant is also present. Their food plant is often associated with shaded, nitrogen rich, damp woodlands. The range of this insect has increased due to the introduction of the host plant T. speciosa. The plant was introduced into many countries such as Denmark, Germany and Poland, which also expanded the distribution of Uroleucon telekiae.
