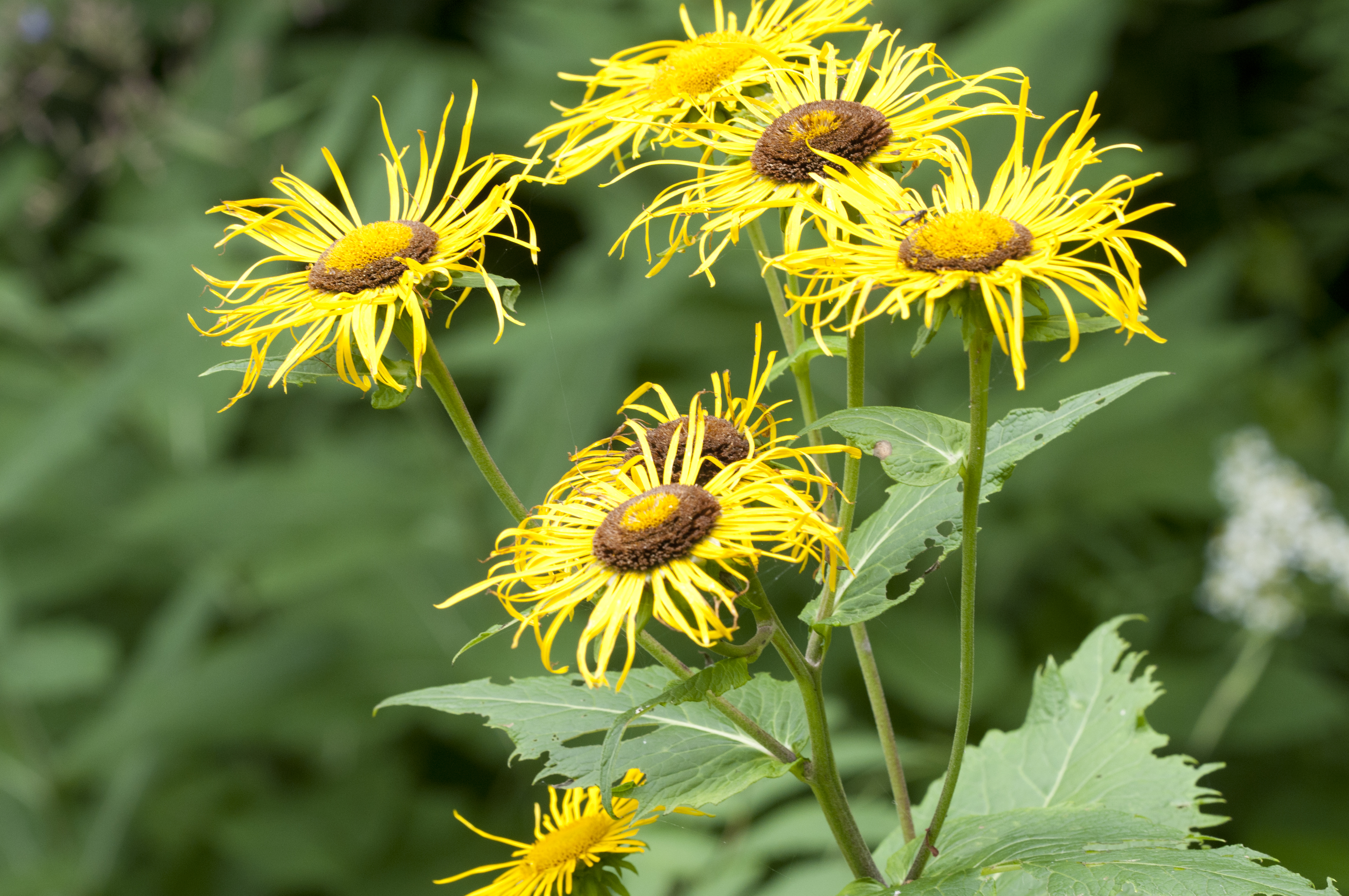

Scientific classification
- Kingdom: Plantae
- Clade: Tracheophytes
- Clade: Angiosperms
- Clade: Eudicots
- Clade: Asterids
- Order: Asterales
- Family: Asteraceae
- Genus: Telekia
- Species: T. speciosa

Binomial name
- Telekia speciosa (Schreb.) Baumg.

Synonyms
- Buphthalmum cordifolium Waldst. & Kit.; Buphthalmum speciosum Schreb.; Corvisartia caucasica G.Don ex Loudon; Inula caucasica Pers.; Inula telekia E.H.L.Krause; Molpadia suaveolens Cass.; Telekia cordifolia DC.; Telekia ovata K.Koch

= Telekia speciosa =

Species of flowering plant

Telekia speciosa, also known as the heart-leaved oxeye or yellow oxeye, is a species of flowering plant within the family Asteraceae.

== Description ==
Telekia speciosa is a herbaceous perennial, which can grow up to 2 metres tall. Leaves are green, triangular, doubly-serrate and long-petioled. Plant leaves can range from 10 to 40 cm long. The leaves are also glabrous on their surface and possess hairs on the undersides. Younger ovate stem leaves are sessile. Plants will bloom from early summer to early autumn. Flowers are hosted on slender stems. Flowers appear daisy-like with ragged yellow petals.

== Distribution ==
=== Native range ===
This species is native to much of Europe, where it can be found in: Albania, Bulgaria, the Czech Republic, Greece, Hungary, Romania, Turkey, Ukraine, Slovakia, Bulgaria and North Macedonia. It is also native to the Baltic states, North and South Caucasus and Central and Northwest European Russia.

=== Introduced range ===
Within Europe Telekia speciosa has been introduced outside of its natural range into the countries of: Austria, Belgium, Denmark, Estonia, Finland, France, Germany, Great Britain, Ireland, Italy, Latvia, Norway, Poland, Sweden and Switzerland. It has also been introduced into the United States, Canada and Japan.

== Habitat ==
Telekia speciosa is an adaptable species which can grow in a wide range of different habitats. It is often found growing in damp, shaded, nitrogen rich woodland. It has also been known to grow in forests, glades, meadows and mountainous habitats. It is also frequently found growing in damp soil on the banks of lakes, rivers and streams. It is also associated with heavily disturbed habitats such as wasteland. This species has evolved to grow well in partial shaded environments. Plants will grow in full sun, but can suffer foliage necrosis during drought. Plants growing in full shade are stunted. It grows best in damp clay soils, which are free of calcium carbonate, however it can grow in sandy, loam or even chalk soils. The species grows at elevations ranging from 300 to 1700 metres above sea level. T. speciosa is sold and sometimes used as an ornamental plant in gardens outside of its natural range.

== Ecology ==
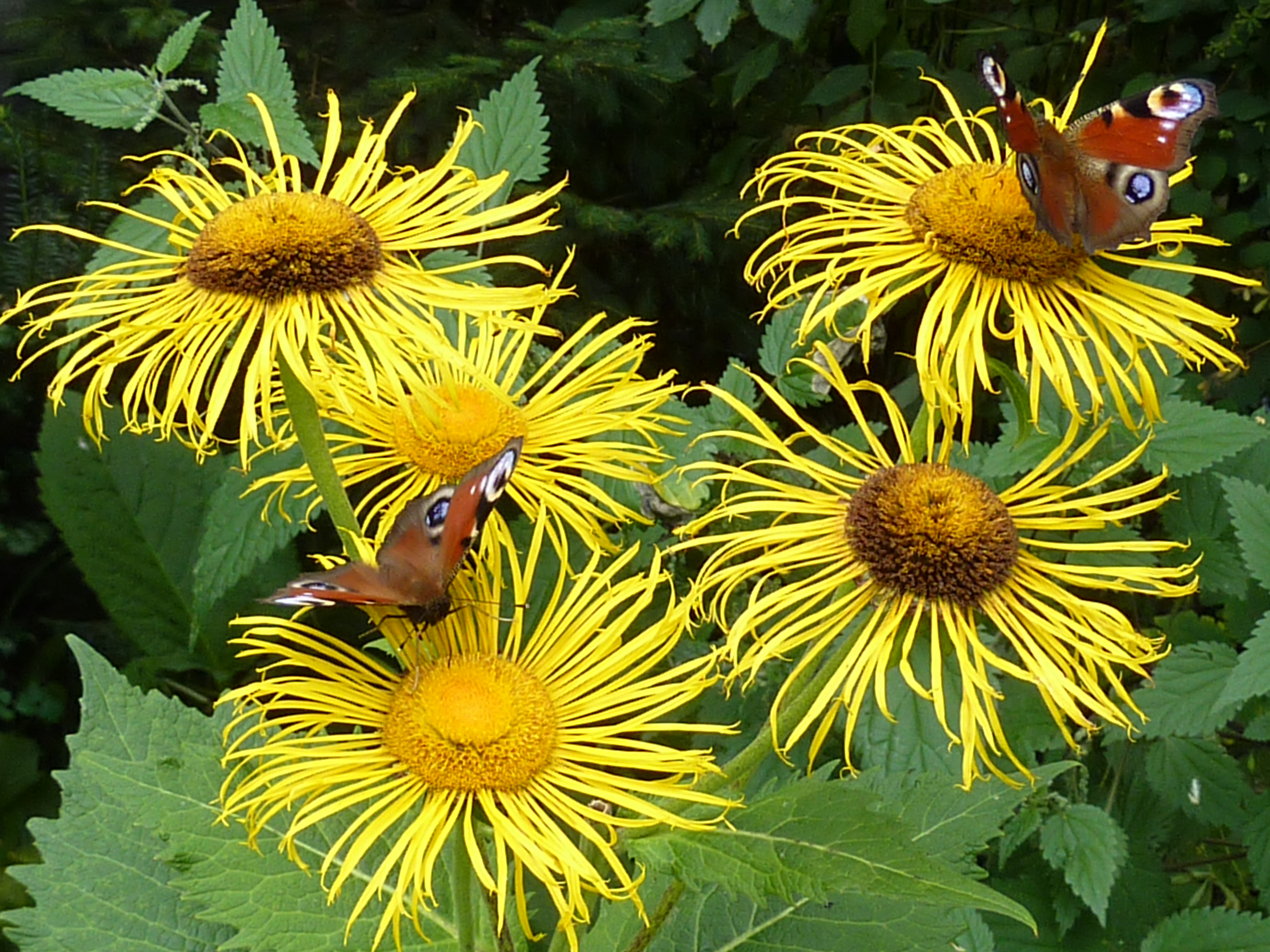
Telekia speciosa flowers visited by butterflies

The flowers of Telekia speciosa are used by a large variety of pollinating insects including various species of bee, butterfly and hoverfly. Butterflies such as the European peacock (Aglais io), the common swallowtail (Papilio machaon), the green-veined white (Pieris napi) and the high brown fritillary (Argynnis adippe) have been recorded to feed from the flower of T. speciosa. Bee species such as the bumblebee (Bombus semenoviellus) also pollinate the flowers of T. speciosa.

The seeds of T. speciosa are consumed by seed eating birds such as goldfinch (Carduelis carduelis) and other finch species.

Telekia speciosa is the food plant of the aphid species Uroleucon telekiae, which is monophagous and feeds from no other plant species.

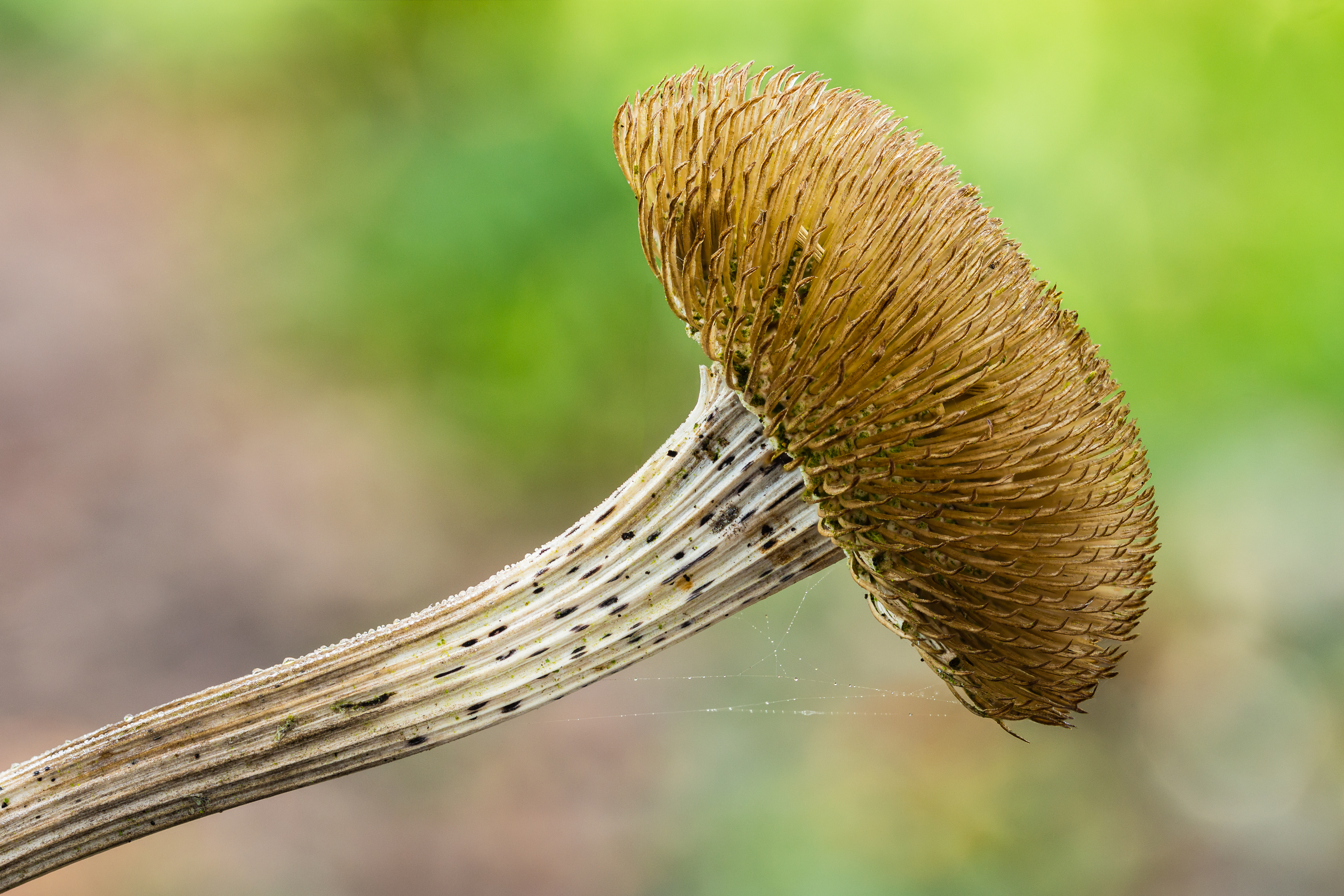
Seed pod of a Telekia speciosa

The fungi Golovinomyces inulae, which causes powdery mildew and Coleosporium telekiae, which causes rust can both infect T. speciosa.

== Gallery ==
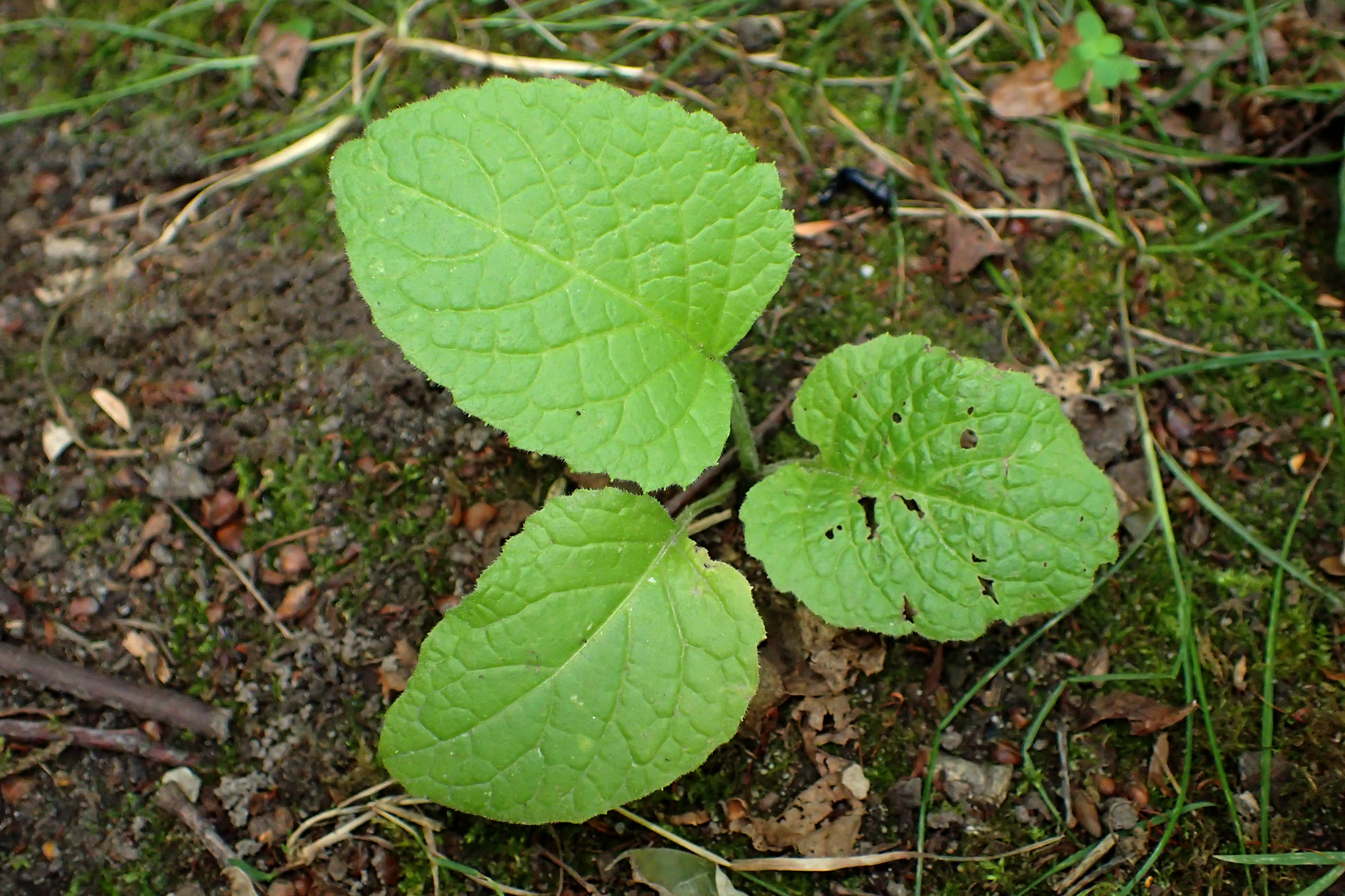
A young Telekia speciosa plant

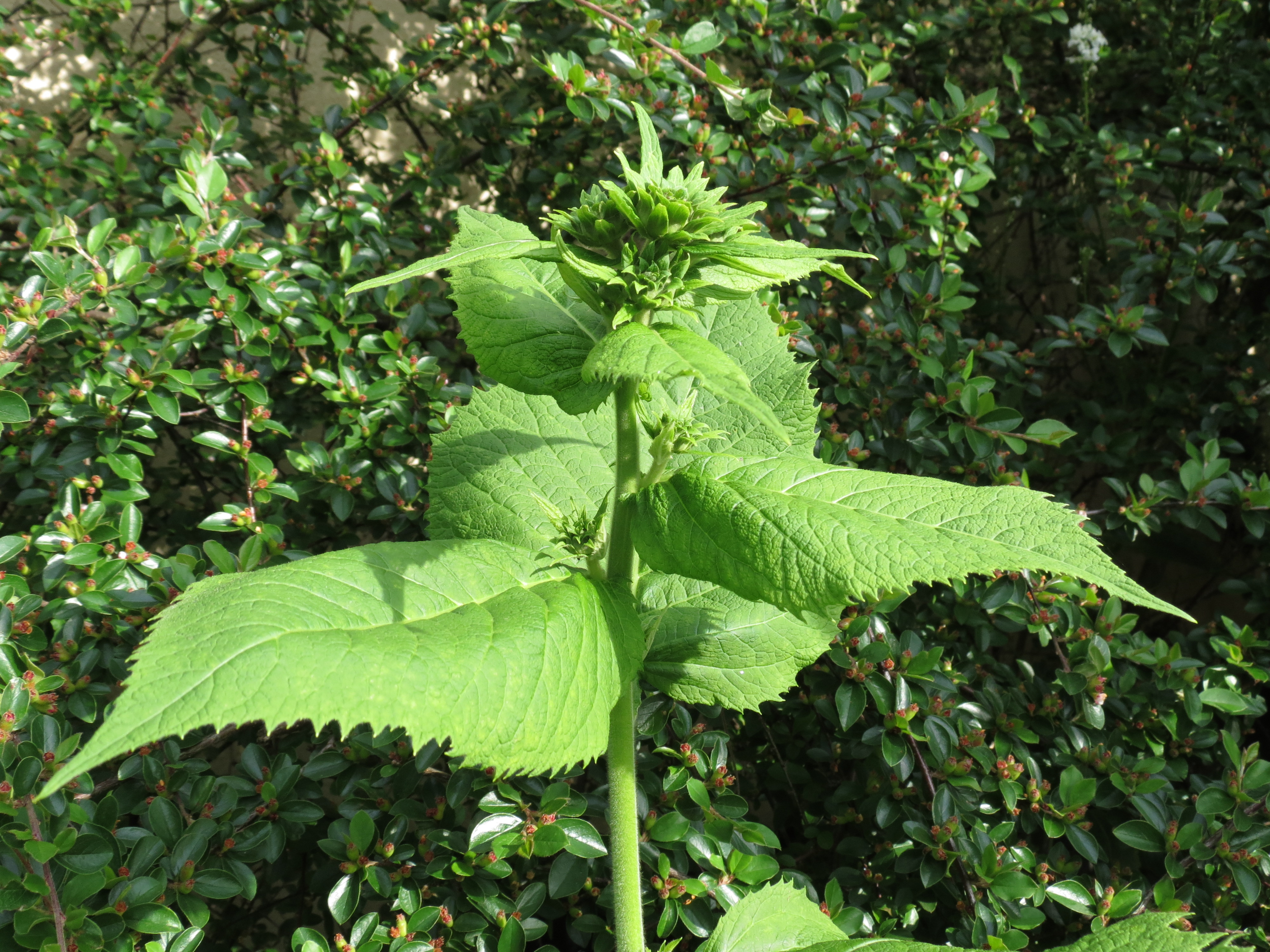
Telekia speciosa with flower bud

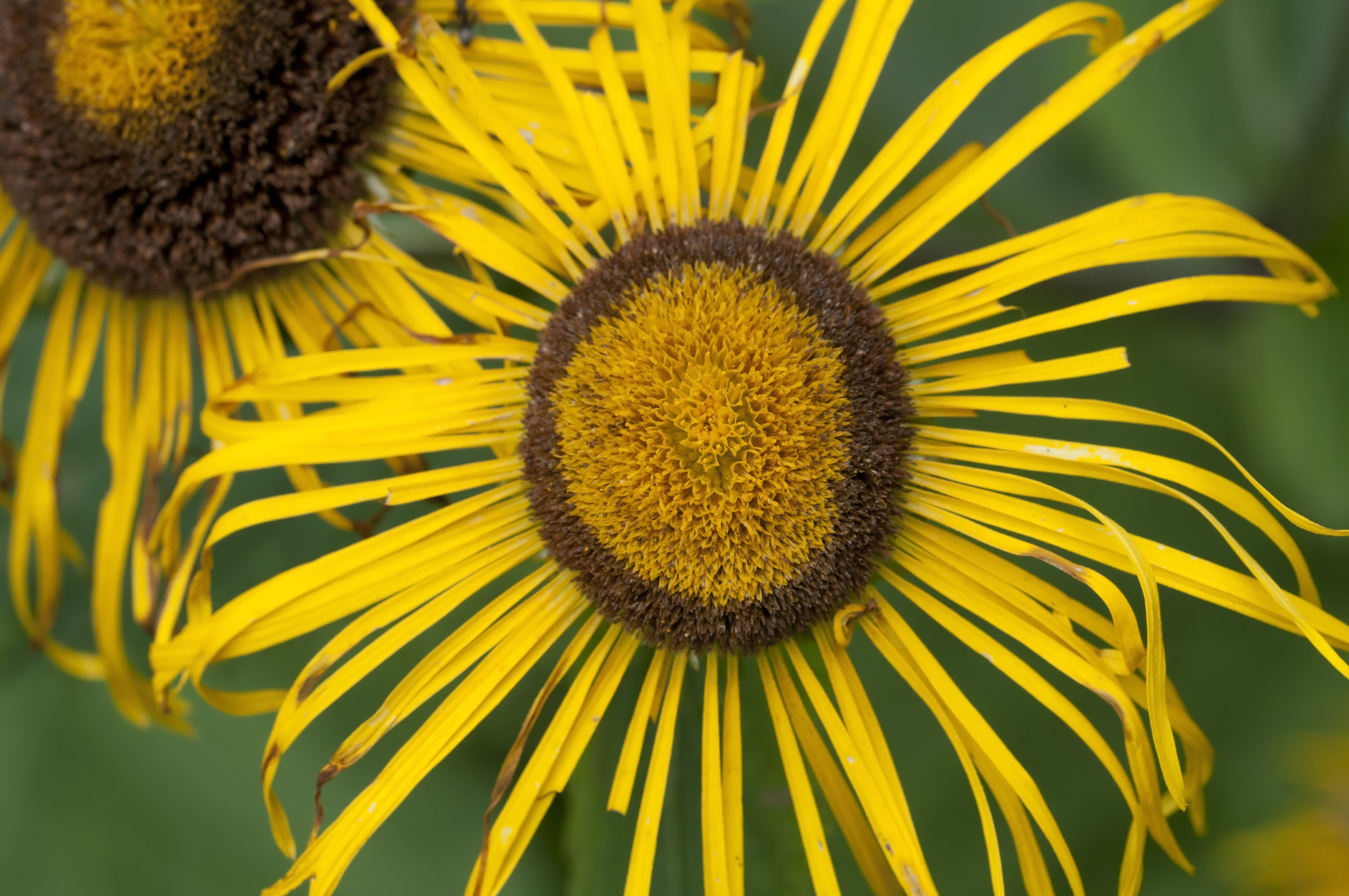
Telekia speciosa bloom

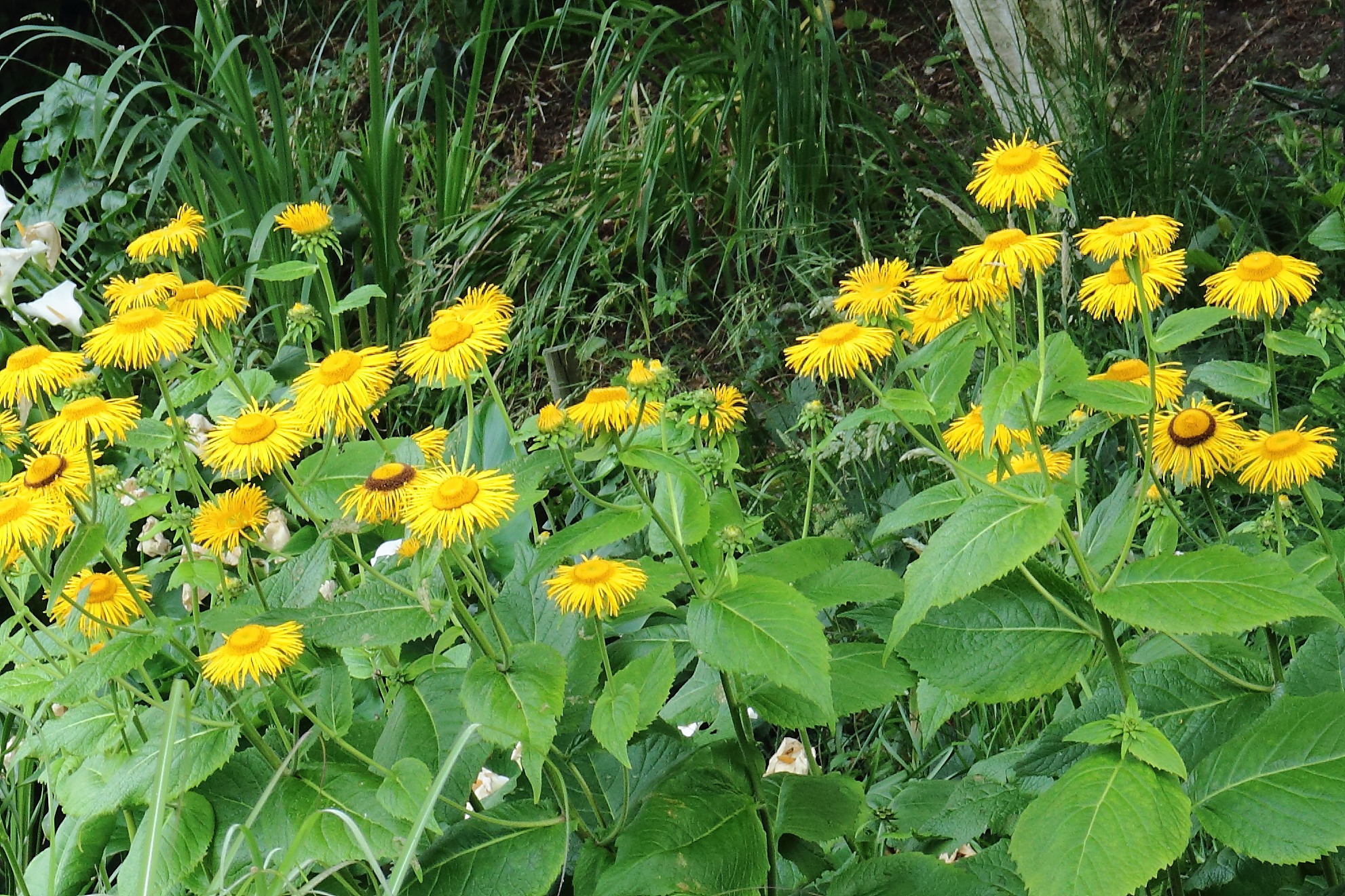
Telekia speciosa growth habit

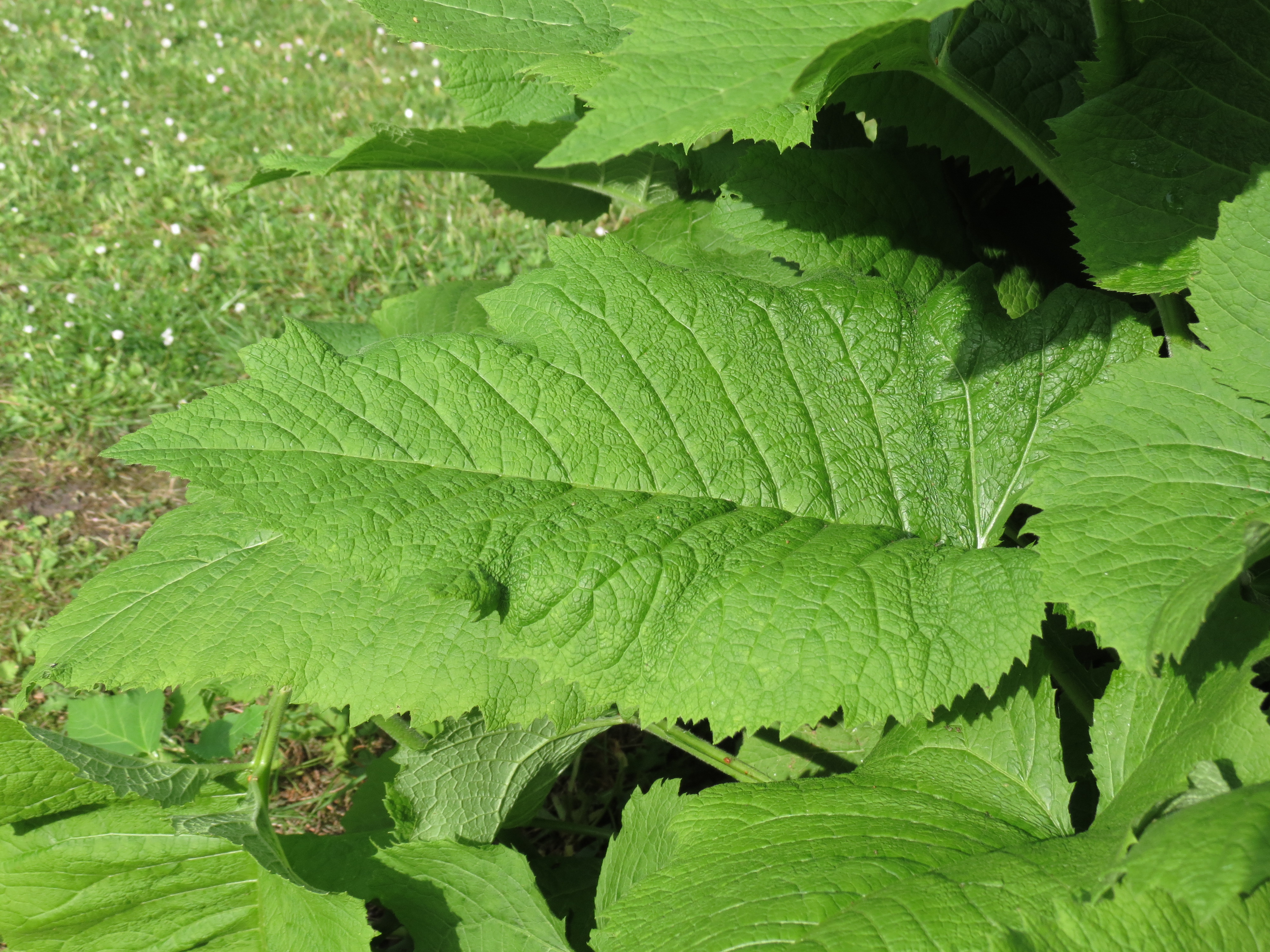
Telekia speciosa leaf

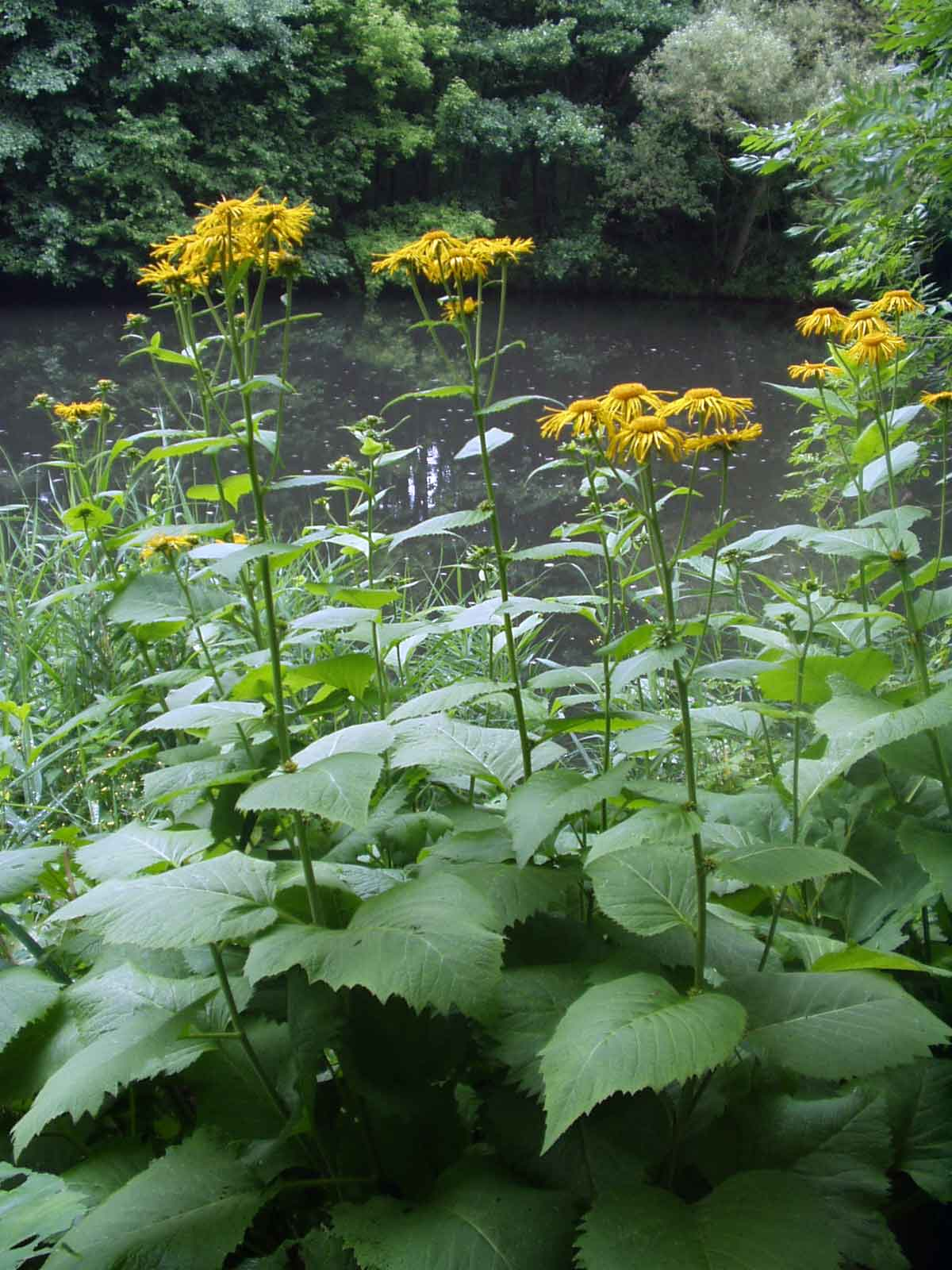
Telekia speciosa growing near to water
