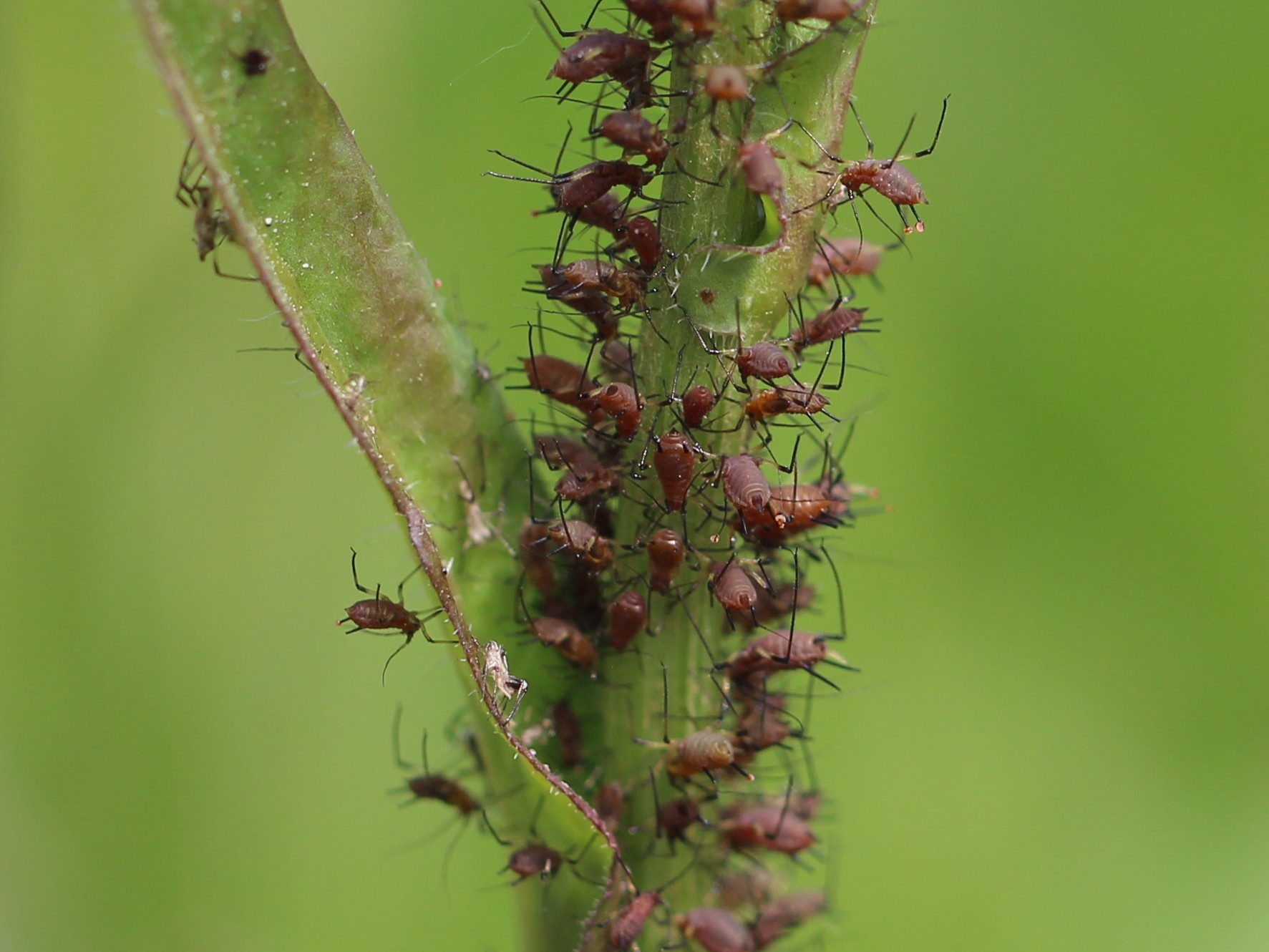

Scientific classification
- Domain: Eukaryota
- Kingdom: Animalia
- Phylum: Arthropoda
- Class: Insecta
- Order: Hemiptera
- Suborder: Sternorrhyncha
- Family: Aphididae
- Genus: Uroleucon
- Species: U. rudbeckiae

Binomial name
- Uroleucon rudbeckiae (Fitch, 1851)

= Uroleucon rudbeckiae =

Species of aphid

Uroleucon rudbeckiae, also known as the goldenglow aphid, is a species of aphid within the family Aphidadae.

== Description ==
Mature Uroleucon rudbeckiae are shiny, bright red with yellowish legs and black antennae. The siphunculi are less than 1.6 times as long as the cauda, with reticulation of small polygonal cells on at least the distal quarter of their length. The cauda is dull yellow or sometimes dark in colour. The body length of adult Uroleucon rudbeckiae is anywhere between 2.4 and 3.2mm.

== Distribution ==
Uroleucon rudbeckiae can be found within both the United States and Canada. In the United States it can be found in the states of: North Carolina and New Mexico. In Canada it could be found in the Canadian Province of British Columbia.

== Habitat ==
Uroleucon rudbeckiae form colonies on many plant species within the genus Rudbeckia. Species such as: Rudbeckia amplexicaulis, Rudbeckia hirta and Rudbeckia laciniata all serve as food plants and habitat for the insect.
