= Uroleucon bulgaricum =

Scientific classification
- Kingdom: Animalia
- Phylum: Arthropoda
- Class: Insecta
- Order: Hemiptera
- Suborder: Sternorrhyncha
- Family: Aphididae
- Genus: Uroleucon
- Species: U. bulgaricum

Binomial name
- Uroleucon bulgaricum Kanturski 2021

Species of insect (aphid)

Uroleucon bulgaricum is a species of aphid found in Bulgaria.
