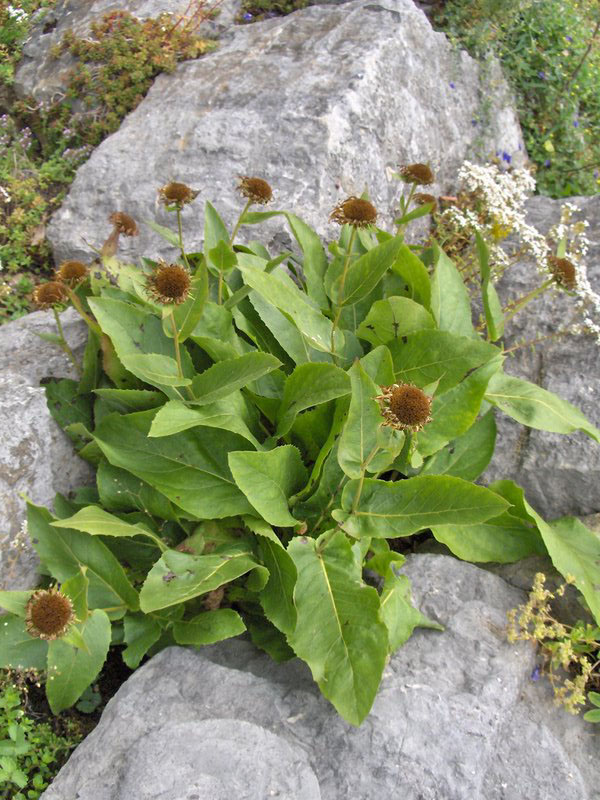
- Telekia speciosissima

Scientific classification
- Kingdom: Plantae
- Clade: Tracheophytes
- Clade: Angiosperms
- Clade: Eudicots
- Clade: Asterids
- Order: Asterales
- Family: Asteraceae
- Subfamily: Asteroideae
- Tribe: Inuleae
- Genus: Telekia; Baumg. 1817

Synonyms
- Molpadia (Cass.) Cass.

= Telekia =

Genus of asters

Telekia is a genus of flowering plant, of the family Asteraceae.

Species

- Telekia speciosa (Schreb.) Baumg. - Europe + southwest Asia from France and Great Britain to Caucasus
- Telekia speciosissima DC. 1836 conserved name, not (L.) Less. 1832 - Lombardy region of Italy

formerly included

- Telekia africana Hook.f. - Anisopappus chinensis subsp. africanus (Hook.f.) S.Ortiz & Paiva
- Telekia speciosissima (L.) Less. 1832, not DC. 1836 - Xerolekia speciosissima (L.) Anderb.
