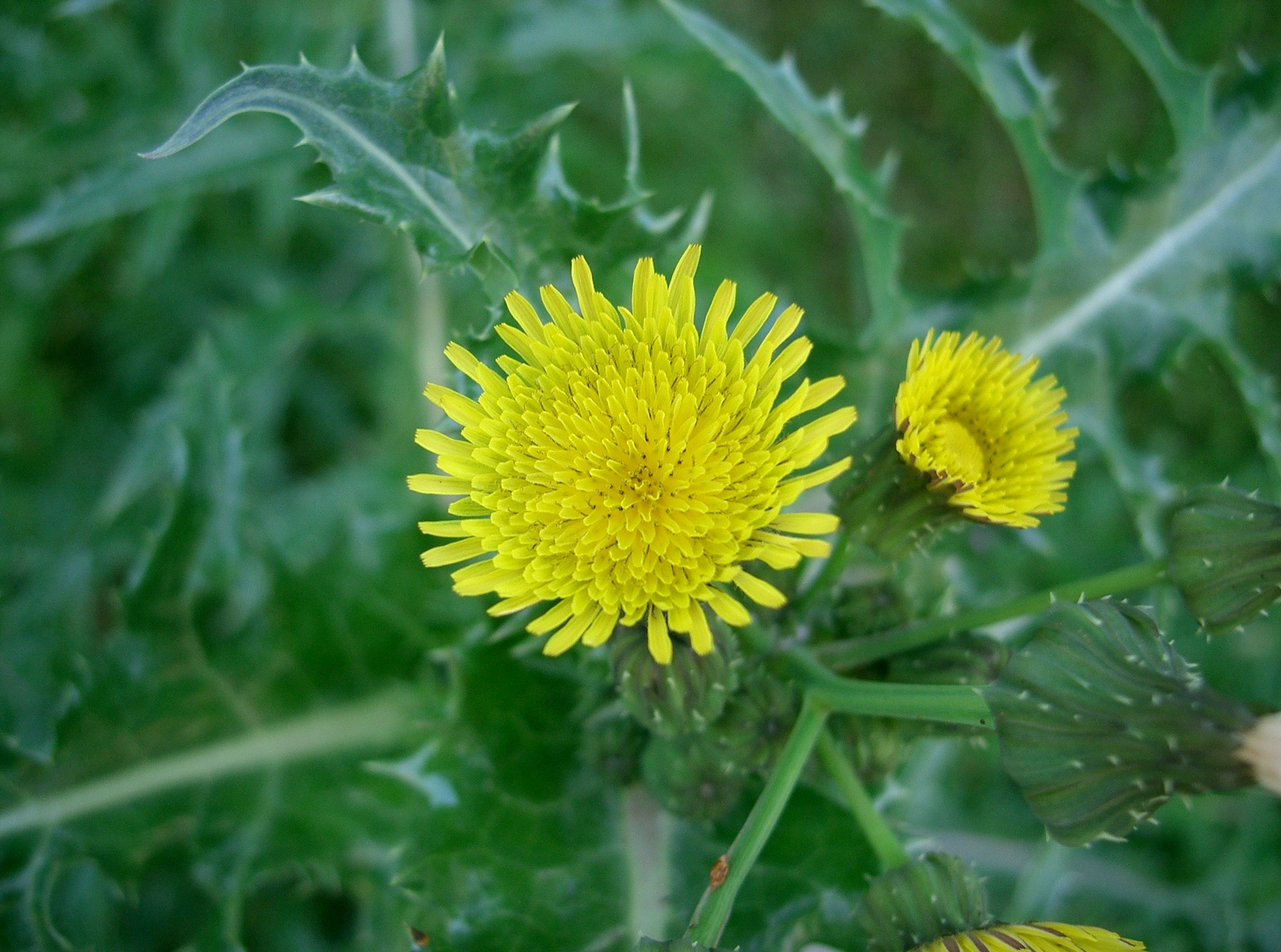

Scientific classification
- Kingdom: Plantae
- Clade: Embryophytes
- Clade: Tracheophytes
- Clade: Angiosperms
- Clade: Eudicots
- Clade: Asterids
- Order: Asterales
- Family: Asteraceae
- Genus: Sonchus
- Species: S. asper

Binomial name
- Sonchus asper (L.) Hill 1769

Synonyms
- Synonymy: Sonchus oleraceus subsp. asper (L.) Ehrh.; Sonchus oleraceus var. asper L.

= Sonchus asper =

Species of flowering plant in the daisy family

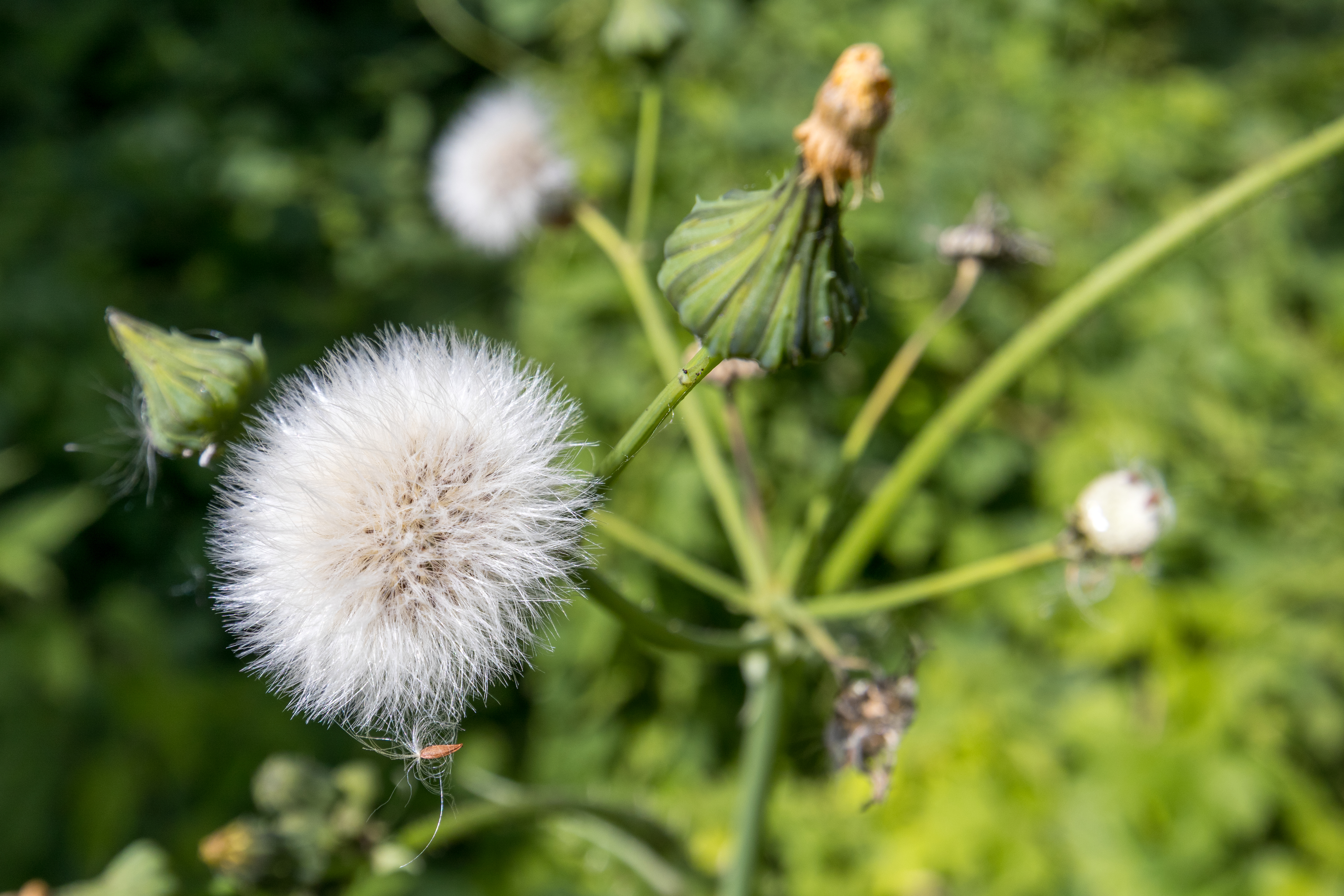
Egg-like flowers (achenes)

Sonchus asper, the prickly sow-thistle, rough milk thistle, spiny sowthistle, sharp-fringed sow thistle, or spiny-leaved sow thistle, is a widespread flowering plant in the tribe Cichorieae within the family Asteraceae.

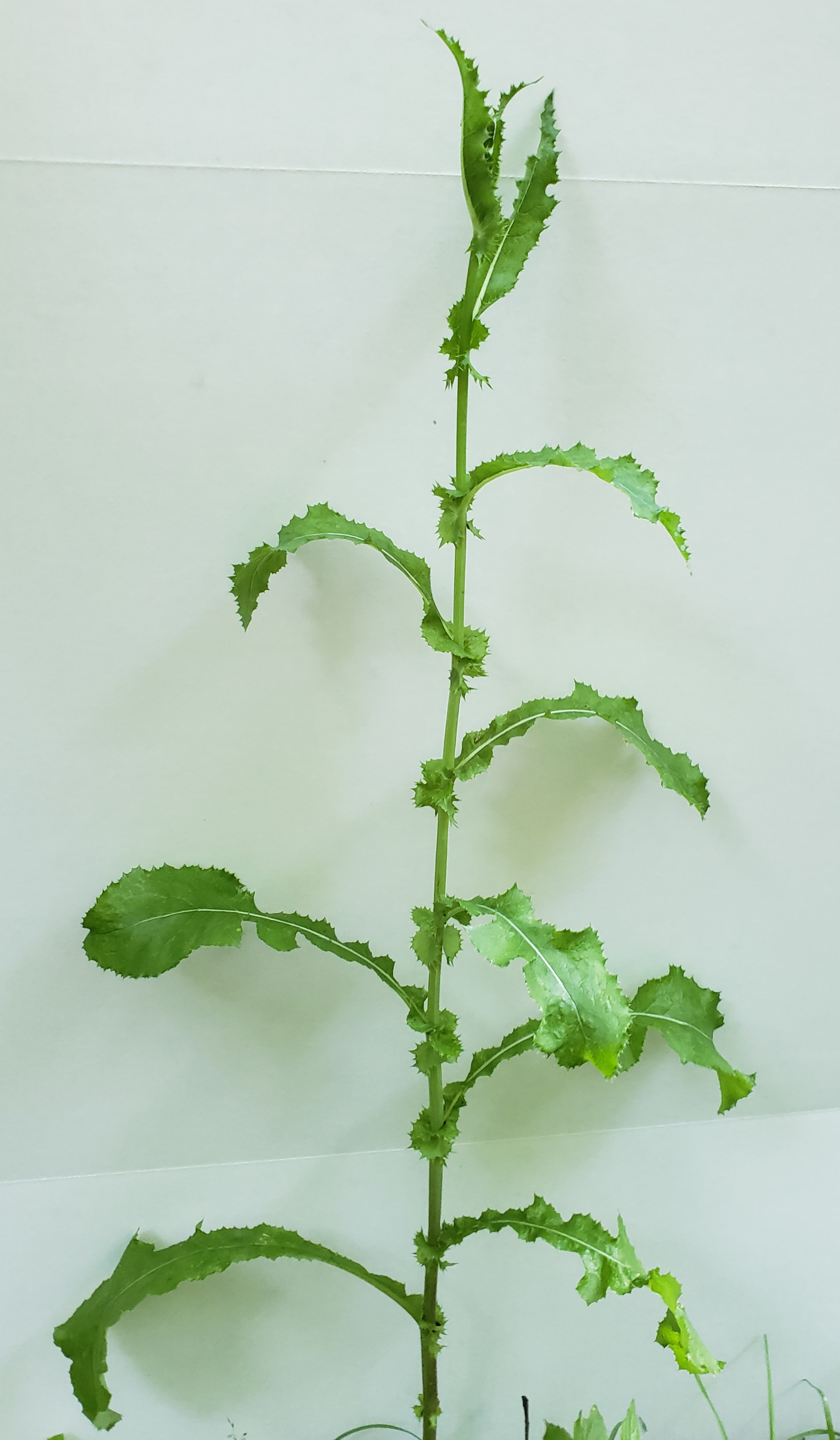
Sonchus asper

== Description ==
Sonchus asper is an annual or biennial herb sometimes reaching a height of 200 centimetres (6.6 ft) with spiny leaves and yellow flowers resembling those of the dandelion. The leaves are bluish-green, simple, lanceolate, with wavy and sometimes lobed margins, covered in spines on both the margins and beneath. The base of the leaf surrounds the stem. The leaves and stems emit a milky sap when cut. One plant will produce several flat-topped arrays of flower heads, each head containing numerous yellow ray flowers but no disc flowers.

== Distribution ==
Sonchus asper is native to Europe, North Africa, and western Asia. It has also become naturalized on other continents and is regarded as a noxious, invasive weed in many places. Its edible leaves make a palatable and nutritious leaf vegetable.

It is found in cultivated soil, pastures, roadsides, edges of yards, vacant lots, construction sites, waste areas and in grasslands.
