= Cappuccino (surname) =

Cappuccino is a surname. Notable people with the surname include:

- Andrew Cappuccino, American orthopedic surgeon
- Elizabeth Cappuccino, American film and television actress
- Frank Cappuccino (1929–2015), American boxing referee
- Naomi Cappuccino, Canadian biologist
