= Damar Hamlin =

American football player (born 1998)

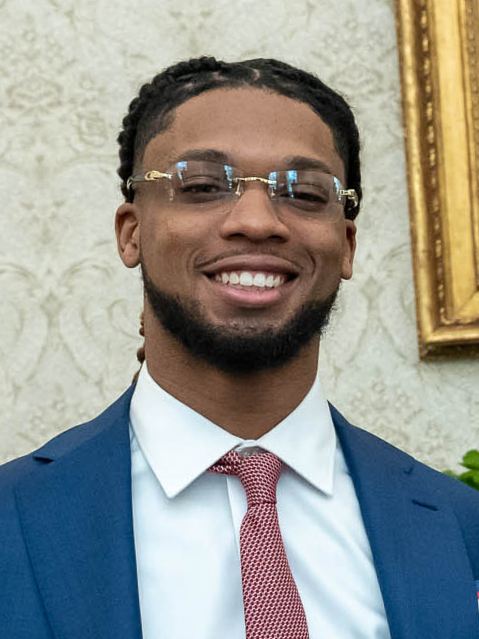
- Hamlin in 2023

No. 3 – Buffalo Bills
- Position: Safety

Personal information
- Born: March 24, 1998 (age 28); McKees Rocks, Pennsylvania, U.S.
- Listed height: 6 ft 0 in (1.83 m)
- Listed weight: 200 lb (91 kg)

Career information
- High school: Central Catholic (Pittsburgh, Pennsylvania)
- College: Pittsburgh (2016–2020)
- NFL draft: 2021: 6th round, 212th overall pick

Career history
- Buffalo Bills (2021–present)

Awards and highlights
- NFLPA Alan Page Community Award (2023); George Halas Award (2023); Second-team All-ACC (2020)

Career NFL statistics as of Week 11, 2026
- Total tackles: 214
- Sacks: 1.5
- Pass deflections: 11
- Interceptions: 3
- Forced fumbles: 1
- Fumble recoveries: 1
- Stats at Pro Football Reference

Damar Romeyelle Hamlin (/dəˈmɑːr/; born March 24, 1998) is an American professional football safety for the Buffalo Bills of the National Football League (NFL). He played college football for the Pittsburgh Panthers and was selected by the Bills in the sixth round of the 2021 NFL draft. Hamlin spent most of his rookie season as a backup before becoming a starter in 2022 after Micah Hyde suffered a season-ending injury.

During a Monday Night Football game against the Cincinnati Bengals on January 2, 2023, Hamlin suffered a cardiac arrest after making a tackle, and he was hospitalized in critical condition. He was released from the hospital nine days later and eventually returned to professional football.

== Early life ==
Hamlin was raised in McKees Rocks, Pennsylvania. He attended Central Catholic High School in Pittsburgh, Pennsylvania. He was named first-team All-State and the Class AAAA Defensive Player of the Year.

College recruiting
Name	Hometown	School	Height	Weight	40^{‡}	Commit date
Damar Hamlin; Safety	McKees Rocks, PA	Central Catholic High School	6 ft 1 in (1.85 m)	185 lb (84 kg)	4.60	Feb 2, 2016
Damar Hamlin; Safety	Recruit ratings: Rivals: 247Sports: (83)					
Overall recruit ranking:
‡ Refers to 40-yard dash; Note: In many cases, Scout, Rivals, 247Sports, On3, and ESPN may conflict in their listings of height, weight and 40 time.; In these cases, the average was taken. ESPN grades are on a 100-point scale.; Sources: "2016 Team Ranking". Rivals.com.

== College career ==
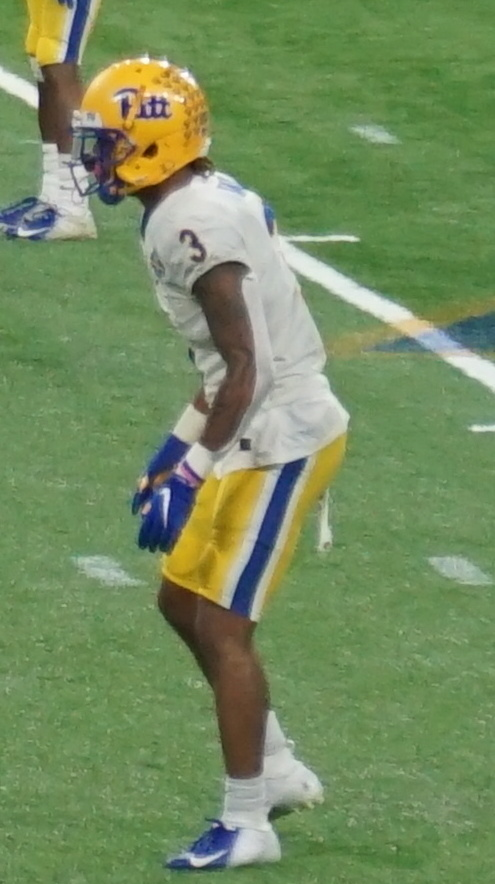
Hamlin with the Pittsburgh Panthers in 2019

Hamlin was considered a top cornerback coming out of Central Catholic High School. He was a four-star recruit and was pursued by major college football programs including Pittsburgh, Penn State, Ohio State and Temple. He selected the Pittsburgh Panthers and played in four games as a freshman in 2016 before suffering an injury and receiving a medical redshirt exception for that year.

As a redshirt freshman playing in his second year in 2017, Hamlin was not back to full health until week three of the football season. Playing the safety position, he recorded 41 tackles with one interception in nine games played.

In 2018, Hamlin led the Panthers "sniper gang" secondary with 77 tackles and two interceptions as a redshirt sophomore and was named honorable mention All-Atlantic Coast Conference (ACC).

In 2019, he registered 84 tackles with 10 passes broken up as a redshirt junior.

Going into his final season in 2020, Hamlin was a team captain and was named to the All-ACC second-team after leading the Panthers with 66 tackles and seven passes broken up. He earned ACC Co-Defensive Back of the Week honors for his November 21, 2020, game against Virginia Tech.

Hamlin earned a bachelor's degree in communication from the University of Pittsburgh.

== Professional career ==
Pre-draft measurables
Height	Weight	Arm length	Hand span	Wingspan	40-yard dash	10-yard split	20-yard split	20-yard shuttle	Three-cone drill	Vertical jump	Broad jump	Bench press
6 ft 0 7/8 in (1.85 m)	200 lb (91 kg)	32 1/4 in (0.82 m)	8 7/8 in (0.23 m)	6 ft 4 1/2 in (1.94 m)	4.59 s	1.46 s	2.69 s	4.40 s	6.93 s	35.0 in (0.89 m)	9 ft 10 in (3.00 m)	18 reps
All values from Pro Day

=== 2021 season ===
The Buffalo Bills selected Hamlin in the sixth round with the 212th overall pick of the 2021 NFL draft. He signed his four-year rookie contract with Buffalo on May 21, 2021. Hamlin played a reserve role in his first season, tallying two tackles and two pass breakup in 14 games played.

=== 2022 season ===
Hamlin became one of Buffalo's starting safeties in 2022 after Micah Hyde suffered a season-ending neck injury in Week 2. Against the New York Jets in Week 9, Hamlin led the team with 12 tackles and a sack in the 20–17 loss. In Week 13 against the New England Patriots, Hamlin was ejected after an illegal hit on Jakobi Meyers in the 24–10 win. He was placed on injured reserve on January 6, 2023, after he collapsed during the game against the Cincinnati Bengals. Overall, Hamlin recorded 91 tackles, 1.5 sacks, and a forced fumble.

==== In-game collapse ====
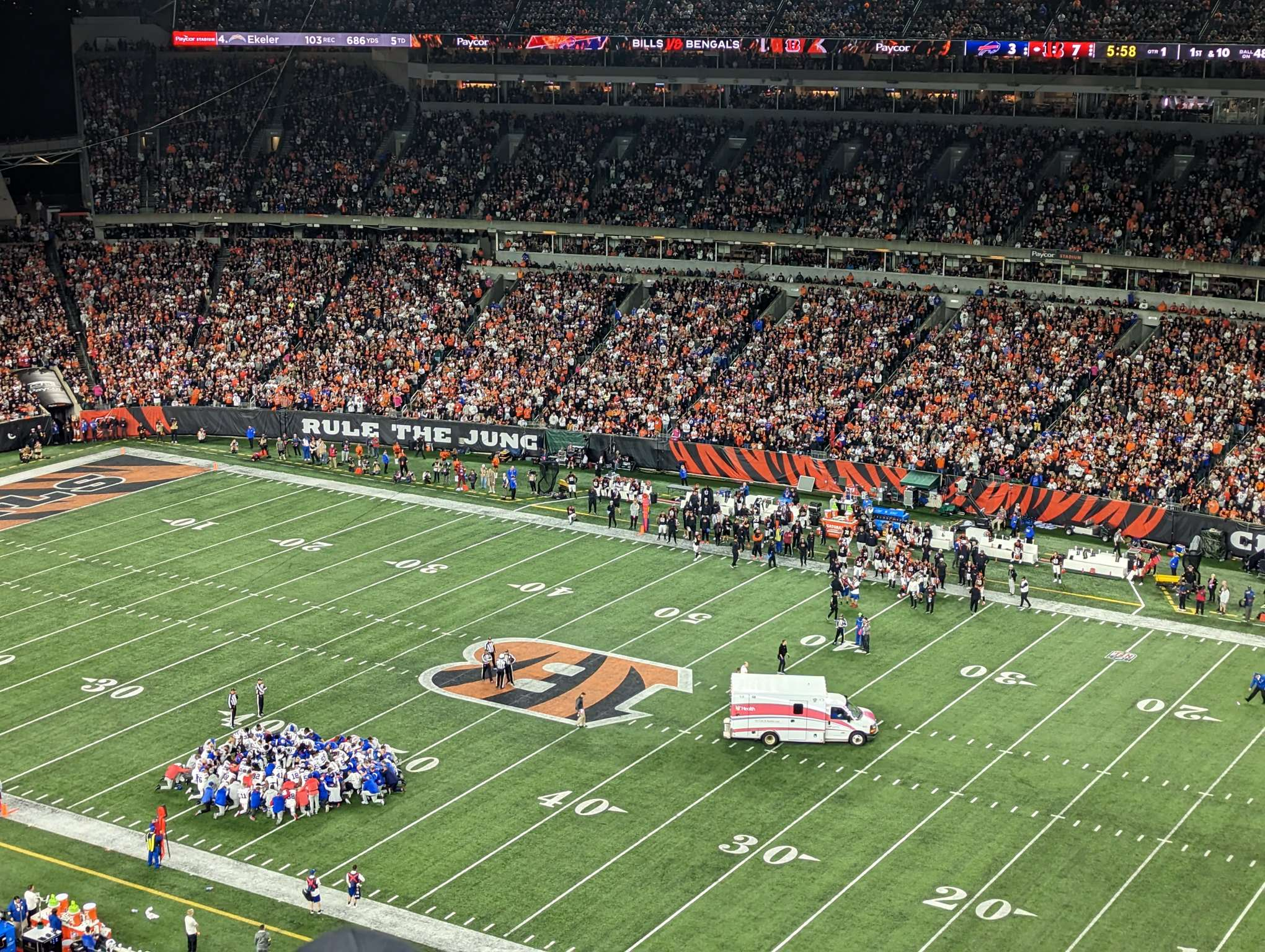
Hamlin is removed by ambulance as his teammates (bottom left in white) pray

On January 2, 2023, during a Week 17 Monday Night Football game against the Bengals, Hamlin collapsed on the field at 8:56 p.m. EST after tackling wide receiver Tee Higgins. At the start of the play, Higgins caught a pass by Joe Burrow near the 50-yard line and ran downfield while leading with his right shoulder, which struck Hamlin's chest. Sports commentators described the tackle as seemingly routine while noting the jarring nature of the contact. Following the play, Hamlin momentarily stood up, then passed out and fell backwards.

Hamlin remained motionless at midfield while team athletic trainers and paramedics rushed to his side within 10 seconds. First responders initiated CPR, automated external defibrillation (AED) and other treatments to Hamlin on the field for 10 minutes. Hamlin was eventually adinistered oxygen and an intravenous solution (IV). An ambulance was brought onto the field about four minutes after his collapse for more assistance. As he was being placed on a stretcher, most of the players from both teams came off the sidelines to kneel or stand on the field near him, visibly upset and emotional about his status. The game was later canceled entirely.

After being transported by ambulance to the University of Cincinnati Medical Center at 9:23 p.m. EST, he was reported to be in critical condition and was intubated. Later that night at 1:48 a.m. local time, the Bills reported that Hamlin had initially suffered cardiac arrest and his heartbeat was restored on-field.

Hamlin later confirmed that he had an episode of commotio cordis, an extremely rare condition in which cardiac rhythm is disrupted by a blow to the chest during a specific 40-millisecond span in the heart's electrical cycle. The condition is 97% fatal if not treated within three minutes.

==== Recovery ====
On January 3, Hamlin remained at the University of Cincinnati Academic Health Center while sedated and on a ventilator. According to his uncle Dorrian Glen, Hamlin was placed on his stomach to help take the pressure off his lungs. He also stated that Hamlin's condition was "trending upwards".

On January 5, Bills cornerback Kaiir Elam said that Hamlin was awake and doing better. The same day, the Bills released a statement, saying, "Damar has shown remarkable improvement over the past 24 hours" and "while still critically ill, he has demonstrated that he appears to be neurologically intact. His lungs continue to heal and he is making steady progress."

Trauma surgeon Timothy Pritts said Hamlin was able to communicate by writing on paper or by nodding and shaking his head, since he still had a breathing tube. When Hamlin woke up, he was able to follow commands, had full control and feeling in his extremities, and asked who won Monday night's football game by communicating in writing on a clipboard. The doctor said significant progress was still needed, but "this marks a really good turning point in his ongoing care."

On January 6, Hamlin was able to breathe on his own, at which point his breathing tube was removed, allowing him to speak. Later that day, he made a brief video call to a Bills team meeting. The next day, Hamlin made his first public comments since his cardiac arrest through social media, stating that he was thankful for the love he has received and asked for continued prayers for a "long road" ahead.

On January 9, a week after being admitted to the hospital, Hamlin was discharged from the University of Cincinnati Medical Center so he could return to Buffalo and continue treatment there. He was flown to Buffalo General Medical Center in stable condition, with tests done the following day to determine if he could be released. Hamlin said via his Twitter account that he was "not home quite just yet" and "still doing & passing a bunch of tests." He was discharged from Buffalo General Medical Center/Gates Vascular Institute two days later, to continue his rehabilitation at home.

A spokesman for the family reported that Hamlin's heart was being monitored and that he was still using additional oxygen. Hamlin was able to attend the Bills' Divisional round game against the Bengals as a spectator. This marked Hamlin's first public appearance since the collapse.

In February 2023, Hamlin made a special on-field appearance at Super Bowl LVII, accompanied by Bills athletic training and UC Health staff members.

The following month, Hamlin met with President Joe Biden at the White House. Hamlin was in Washington, D.C. to support the Access to AEDs Act, which would assist schools in obtaining and using automated external defibrillators. The week after, Hamlin attended a CPR seminar being presented by the Carolina Panthers and the American Heart Association in Charlotte.

On April 18, 2023, Buffalo Bills general manager Brandon Beane stated that Hamlin was fully cleared to return to the NFL. That same day, Hamlin announced his intention to continue playing football.

==== Reactions ====
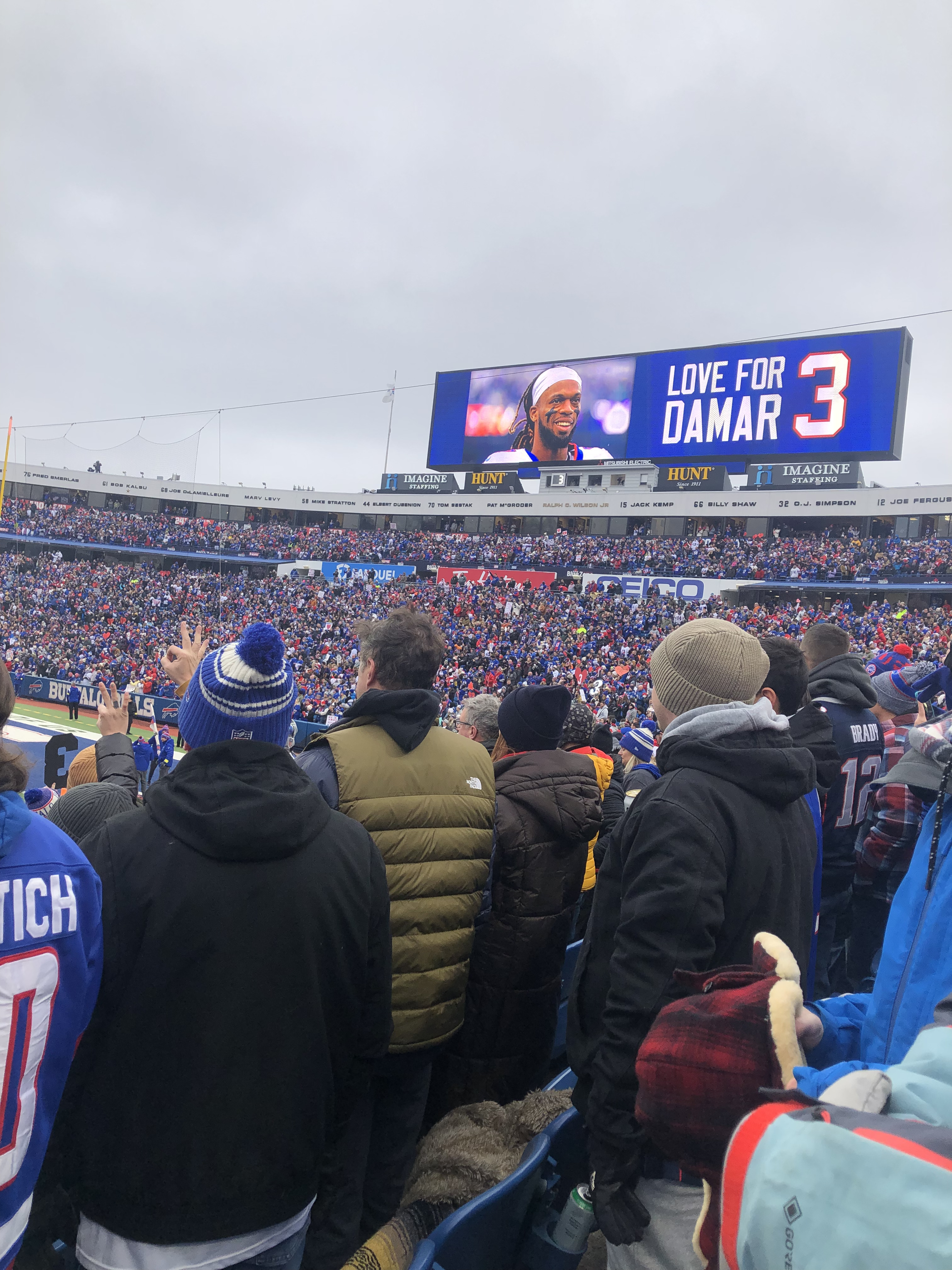
Bills showing support for Hamlin the week after his collapse at home against the Patriots

Following the collapse, numerous NFL players and teams quickly offered their support and prayers on social media. The following day, all 32 NFL teams changed their profile pictures on Twitter to a picture of Hamlin's jersey and text that reads "Pray For Damar". Tee Higgins offered his condolences to Hamlin's family, as did Cincinnati Bengals wide receiver Ja'Marr Chase. Buffalo Bills quarterback Josh Allen urged people, "Please pray for our brother." Retired ice hockey player Chris Pronger, who had also experienced a commotio cordis-caused cardiac arrest during his career, wished for Hamlin to have a full recovery.

Fans began gathering outside the University of Cincinnati Academic Health Center following his collapse. Hours after the incident, the lights on Paycor Stadium, the location of the game, were lit blue in honor of Hamlin along with the lights on Fifth Third Bank's headquarters on Fountain Square in downtown Cincinnati. Niagara Falls was illuminated in blue on the evening of January 3 in support of Hamlin.

Shortly after the incident, there was an increase in rhetoric and disinformation from well-known anti-vaxxers, including Charlie Kirk and Drew Pinsky, making unfounded claims about Hamlin's cardiac arrest and COVID-19 vaccines.

The Bills dedicated their Week 18 January 8, 2023, game, against the New England Patriots, to Hamlin. The opening kickoff of the game, shortly after a showing of support for Hamlin from both the organization and fans, would be returned by Nyheim Hines for a touchdown for the Bills. The Bills' 35–23 victory would also eliminate the rival Patriots from playoff contention.

==== Awards ====
On May 15, 2023, Hamlin received the George Halas Award that is given annually by the Pro Football Writers of America to the NFL player, coach, or staff member who overcomes the most adversity to succeed. On July 12, 2023, Hamlin was honored to present the Pat Tillman Award to the Buffalo Bills training staff during the ESPY awards ceremony. It was an emotional moment for Hamlin, the staff, and his fans, who posted it on social media.

=== 2023 season ===
On August 12, 2023, Hamlin played his first NFL snap since his cardiac arrest in the Bills' preseason opener against the Las Vegas Raiders. After playing in all three preseason contests, Hamlin was a healthy scratch for the first three games of the season. On October 1, he was activated for the first time since his cardiac arrest in week four against the Miami Dolphins, serving as a backup after Jordan Poyer was ruled out due to an injury. He played a total of 18 snaps on the night, all on special teams. On November 13, Hamlin played his first snaps on defense and made his first tackle since the on-field incident during the fourth quarter of the Bills' week ten game against the Denver Broncos.

In the Divisional Round playoff game against the Kansas City Chiefs, Hamlin took a direct snap during a fake punt in the fourth quarter after the Bills noticed the Chiefs only had ten players on the field. On a fourth-and-5, Hamlin carried the ball for two yards but was stopped three yards short, resulting in the Chiefs taking over on downs. Hamlin was the heavy favorite to win AP Comeback Player of the Year, but was ultimately beat out by Joe Flacco. Both Hamlin and Flacco believed that the former should have won the award.

=== 2024 season ===
After the Bills parted ways with starting safeties Micah Hyde and Jordan Poyer, Hamlin started at safety during the Bills' week one game against the Arizona Cardinals, marking his first start since his cardiac arrest.

In Week 3, Hamlin recorded his first career interception in a 47–10 Bills win over the Jacksonville Jaguars. He was named a first alternate in the 2025 Pro Bowl Games near the end of the season for his play in 2024.

=== 2025 season ===
On March 12, 2025, Hamlin re-signed with the Bills on a one-year, $2 million contract. After suffering a pectoral injury in practice, Hamlin was placed on injured reserve on October 11.

=== 2026 season ===
On March 27, 2026, Hamlin re-signed with the Bills on a one-year deal. He began the season in a backup capacity as the Bills signed C. J. Gardner-Johnson to start, but following the latter's suspension for a spitting incident, Hamlin made the start against the Baltimore Ravens. Within the next week, Gardner-Johnson was released.

== Career statistics ==
Legend
**Bold**	Career high

=== NFL ===
==== Regular season ====
Year	Team	Games		Tackles					Interceptions						Fumbles		
Year	Team	GP	GS	Cmb	Solo	Ast	Sck	TFL	PD	Int	Yds	Avg	Lng	TD	FF	FR	TD
2021	BUF	14	0	2	2	0	0.0	0	2	0	0	—	0	0	0	0	0
2022	BUF	15	13	**91**	**63**	**28**	**1.5**	**6**	2	0	0	—	0	0	**1**	0	0
2023	BUF	5	0	2	2	0	0.0	0	0	0	0	—	0	0	0	0	0
2024	BUF	14	14	89	62	27	0.0	2	**5**	**2**	**19**	**9.5**	**19**	0	0	**1**	0
2025	BUF	5	0	1	1	0	0.0	0	0	0	0	0.0	0	0	0	0	0
2026	BUF	10	2	29	16	13	0.0	0	2	1	0	0.0	0	0	0	0	0
Career		63	29	214	146	68	1.5	8	11	3	19	9.5	19	0	1	1	0

==== Postseason ====
Year	Team	Games		Tackles					Interceptions						Fumbles		
Year	Team	GP	GS	Cmb	Solo	Ast	Sck	TFL	PD	Int	Yds	Avg	Lng	TD	FF	FR	TD
2021	BUF	2	0	1	1	0	0.0	0	0	0	0	0.0	0	0	0	0	0
2022	BUF	Did not play due to injury															
2023	BUF	2	0	2	2	0	0.0	0	0	0	0	0.0	0	0	0	0	0
2024	BUF	3	3	**15**	**7**	**8**	**1.0**	**2**	0	0	0	0.0	0	0	**1**	0	0
2025	BUF	Did not play due to injury															
Career		7	3	18	10	8	1.0	2	0	0	0	0.0	0	0	1	0	0

=== College ===
Season	Team	Tackles					Interceptions						Fumbles		
Season	Team	Solo	Ast	Cmb	TfL	Sck	PD	Int	Yds	Avg	Lng	TD	FF	FR	TD
2016	Pittsburgh	4	4	8	0.0	0.0	0	0	0	0.0	0	0	0	0	0
2017	Pittsburgh	30	11	41	1.0	0.0	0	1	5	5.0	5	0	0	0	0
2018	Pittsburgh	53	23	76	3.0	0.0	4	**2**	**79**	**39.5**	**79**	0	0	**1**	0
2019	Pittsburgh	**60**	24	**84**	2.5	0.0	**10**	1	14	14.0	14	0	0	0	0
2020	Pittsburgh	38	**28**	66	**3.5**	0.0	7	**2**	4	2.0	4	0	0	0	0
Career		185	90	275	10.0	0.0	21	6	102	17.0	79	0	0	1	0

== Personal life ==
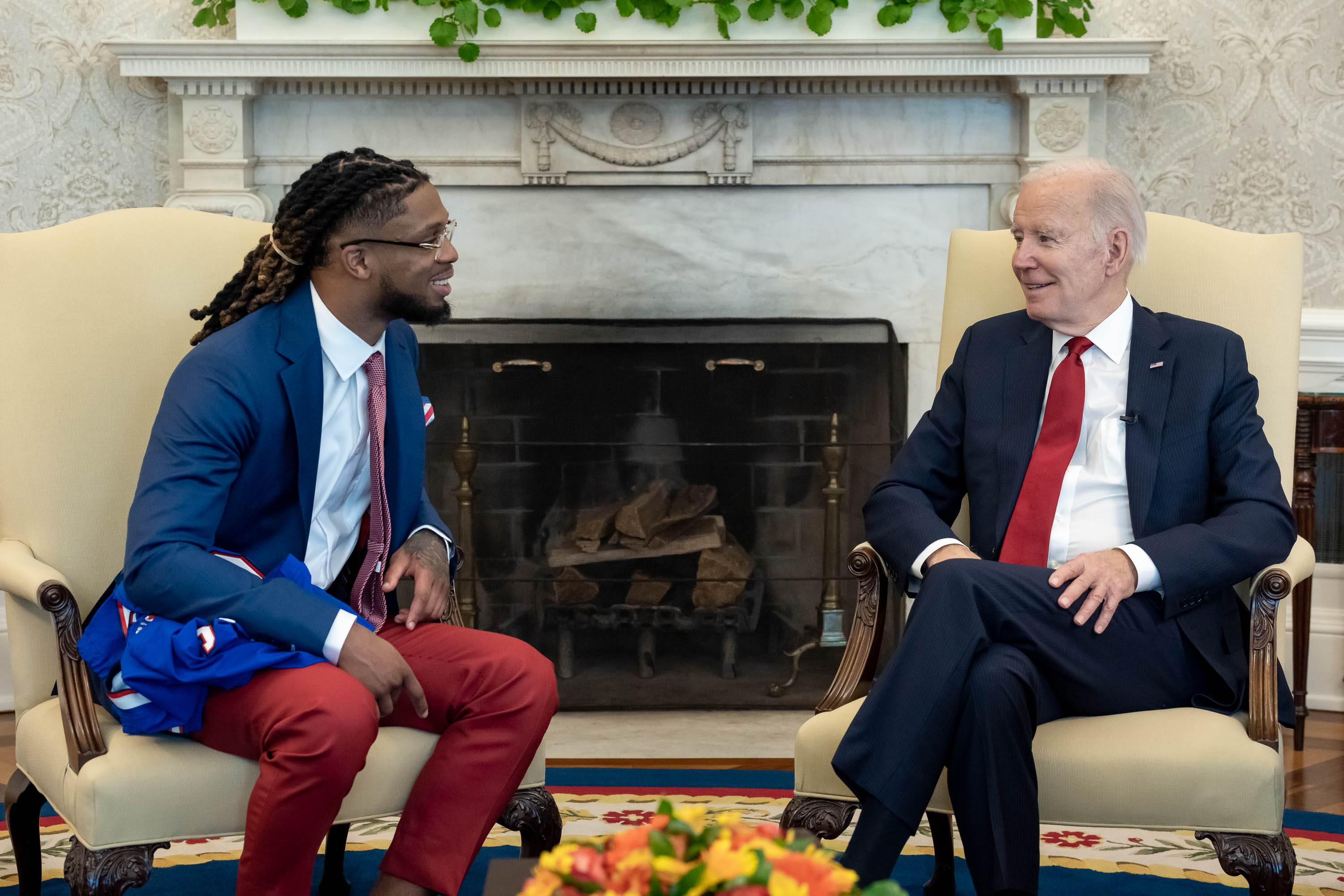
Hamlin and U.S. President Joe Biden in the Oval Office in 2023

In addition to his football career, Hamlin is a fashion entrepreneur, having started a fashion line, Chasing Millions, while at the University of Pittsburgh.

Hamlin made guest cameos as himself in two Hallmark Channel original films, Holiday Touchdown: A Bills Love Story and The More the Merrier, that both premiered in 2025.

=== Charity ===
In 2020, Hamlin started organizing annual charity Christmas toy drives in his hometown of McKees Rocks, Pennsylvania. The GoFundMe campaign for his 2020 toy drive had set a goal of $2,500.

In the hours following his in-game collapse and medical emergency in January 2023, Hamlin's 2020 GoFundMe campaign for the Chasing M's Foundation toy drive received a massive influx of donations from fans and others. Many of the donations had messages of support for Hamlin. In the days that followed, dozens of NFL players, coaches, and executives donated to the campaign, which grew from its $2,500 goal amount to over $8.7 million as of January 12, 2023. Chasing M's Foundation later updated their GoFundMe message saying the "fundraiser was initially established to support a toy drive for Damar's community," but was "hopeful about Damar's future involvement in disbursing the incredibly generous contributions." On January 12, The Buffalo News had a detailed story covering the enormous changes facing Chasing M's structure and operations in light of the large donations, including its tax-exempt status and governance.

In 2023, Hamlin announced that he and the Chasing M's foundation would fund ten $1,000 scholarships for under-served young people in the Cincinnati area to cover the costs of attending private high school or a local trade school or university. Each of the scholarships were named after a member of the UC medical staff that contributed to Hamlin's recovery. The program is set to run for three years.

== See also ==
- Christian Eriksen – soccer player who suffered a similar cardiac arrest during a competition
- Kevin Everett – another former Bills player who suffered a life threatening injury during a game, eventually making a recovery
