= Cappuccino (disambiguation) =

Cappuccino is an Italian coffee drink

Cappuccino may also refer to:

- Cappuccino (album), a 2004 album by Mijares
- "Cappuccino" (song), a 1999 song by Rie Tomosaka produced by Ringo Sheena
- "Cappucino" (song), a song from MC Lyte's album Eyes on This
- Cappuccino (film), a 1989 Australian comedy film
- Cappuccino (surname)
- Cappucinno, a TV ident for the BBC Two Window on the World series
- Cappuccino homolog, a protein in humans encoded by the CNO gene
- Suzuki Cappuccino, a car made by Suzuki Motor Corporation

== See also ==
- Cappadonna, American rapper, also known as Cappachino
