= Naomi Cappuccino =

American biologist

- Education: Cornell University, Ph.D. Brown University, B.A.
- Known for: Invasive species and biological control
- Scientific career
- Fields: Ecology
- Workplaces: Carleton University
- Thesis: Comparative Population Dynamics of Two Goldenrod Aphids: Spatial Patterns and Temporal Constancy (1987)

Naomi Cappuccino is an associate professor of biology at Carleton University in Ottawa, Canada. Her research primarily focuses on population ecology and biological control of invasive species.

== Education ==
Cappuccino received her bachelor's degree in biology from Brown University in 1982. She went on to earn her Ph.D. from Cornell University in ecology and evolutionary biology in 1988. Her thesis was titled Comparative Population Dynamics of Two Goldenrod Aphids: Spatial Patterns and Temporal Constancy, which compared two species that feed on the Solidago altissima: the Uroleucon nigrotuberculatum and Uroleucon caligatum.

== Career and research ==
Cappuccino worked at the Université du Québec à Montréal for five years, researching the spruce budworm in northwestern Québec. Currently, she teaches a number of classes on plants and plant-animal interactions and works as a co-supervisor for undergraduate honors students and graduate students at the Central Experimental Farm.

Her current research works to help her local community combat invasive species using natural population control methods. The first invasive species Cappuccino and her fellow researchers approached was the dog-strangling vine, an Eastern European vine that was sweeping across Canada, strangling plants and surviving winters, making anthropogenic removal very difficult. The researches retrieved one of the vine's natural predators, the Hypena opulenta moth, and saw successful results with decreased vines across the areas where this tactic was implemented while not affecting local species. Her current research is on population control of the invasive lily leaf beetle, which also involves using the species' natural predator, the Tetrastichus setifer, a non-stinging parasitic wasp that only attacks the beetle. The wasps lay eggs on the beetle larvae, and the wasp larvae eat the beetle larvae from the inside. Results with the lily leaf beetle have been found to be up to 90 percent effective.

=== Awards and honors ===
Cappuccino's paper The Nature of Population Stability in Eurosta solidaginis, A Nonoutbreaking Herbivore of Goldenrod was chosen for the 1993 George Mercer Award, an award given by the Ecological Society of America for ecological researchers under the age of 40. Cappuccino herself considers this to be one of her best experiments. Her paper was awarded for its "insightful experiments on population regulation, thoughtful interpretation of the results, and an impressive ability to extrapolate a crucial ecological process over space and time," and because "it is a model for modern studies of population regulation."

=== Publications ===
Some of Cappuccino's cited publications include:

- Jenner, W.H., Mason, P.G., Cappuccino, N. and Kuhlmann U. 2010. Native range assessment of classical biological control agents: impact of inundative releases as pre-introduction evaluation. Bulletin of Entomological Research 100:387-394.
- Jenner, W.H., Kuhlmann, U., Mason, P.G and Cappuccino, N. 2010. Comparative life tables of leek moth, Acrolepiopsis assectella (Zeller) (Lepidoptera: Acrolepiidae), in its native range. Bulletin of Entomological Research 100:87-97.
- Jogesh, T., Carpenter, D., and Cappuccino, N. 2008. Herbivory on invasive exotic plants and their non-invasive relatives. Biological Invasions 10:797-804.
- Mogg, C., Petit, P., Cappuccino, N., Durst, T., McKague, C., Foster, M., Yack, J. E., Arnason, J. T. and Smith, M. L. 2008. Tests of the antibiotic properties of the invasive vine Vincetoxicum rossicum against bacteria, fungi and insects. Biochemical Systematics and Ecology 36:383-391.
- Ernst, C., Cappuccino, N. and Arnason, J. T. 2007. Potential novel hosts for the lily leaf beetle Lilioceris lilii Scopoli (Coleoptera : Chrysomelidae) in eastern North America. Ecological Entomology 32:45-52.
- Cappuccino, N. and Arnason, J. T. 2006. Novel chemistry of invasive exotic plants. Biology Letters 2: 189–193.
