= George Halas Award =

American football award for overcoming adversity

- Sport: American football
- League: National Football League
- Awarded for: An NFL player, coach or staff member overcoming adversity
- Presented by: Pro Football Writers of America

History
- First award: Joe Namath, 1969
- Most recent: Brian Flores, 2026
- Website: www.profootballwriters.org/off-field-awards/pfwa-george-halas-award/

The George Halas Award is given by the Pro Football Writers of America (PFWA) to a National Football League (NFL) player, coach or staff member who overcomes the most adversity to succeed.

The award is named for George Halas, a charter member (1963) of the Pro Football Hall of Fame who was associated with the Chicago Bears and NFL from their inception in 1920 until his death in 1983 as an owner, manager, player and promoter.

Halas represented the Bears, then known as the Decatur Staleys, at the Sept. 17, 1920 organizational meeting of the American Football Association in Canton, Ohio. One year later, the AFA became known as the National Football League.

Halas’ teams won six NFL titles in his 40 seasons as the Bears’ coach. His 318 regular-season wins and 324 total victories were long-standing NFL records until broken by Don Shula in 1993.

In 1970, the George Halas Award went to Gale Sayers for his comeback from knee surgery to lead the NFL in rushing in 1969. Sayers gave an emotional speech that was memorialized in the film Brian's Song. Said Sayers, "You flatter me by giving me this award, but I’ll tell you here and now that I accept it for Brian Piccolo. Brian Piccolo is the man of courage who should receive the George S. Halas Award. I accept it tonight, but I’ll present it to Brian tomorrow. I love Brian Piccolo. And I’d like all of you to love him, too. And tonight, when you hit your knees, ask God to love him, too."

Other notable winners of the George Halas Award include Joe Namath, Steeler running back Rocky Bleier, Hall of Fame cornerback Jimmy Johnson, New York Giant cancer survivor Karl Nelson, Hall of Famers Dan Hampton and Joe Montana, Denver Broncos guard Mark Schlereth, former N.Y. Giant Kerry Collins, San Francisco 49ers Garrison Hearst and Bryant Young, coach and former linebacker Sam Mills, Dolphins running back Robert Edwards, linebacker Mark Fields, former head coach Tony Dungy, former New Orleans Saints quarterback Drew Brees, New England Patriots owner Robert Kraft, and former Saints safety and ALS advocate Steve Gleason.

== Recipients ==
George Halas Award winners
Year	Winner	Team
1969	Joe Namath	New York Jets
1970	Gale Sayers	Chicago Bears
1971	Tom Dempsey	New Orleans Saints
1972	Jimmy Johnson	San Francisco 49ers
1973	Mike Tileman	Atlanta Falcons
1974	Dick Butkus	Chicago Bears
1975	Rocky Bleier	Pittsburgh Steelers
1976	Billy Kilmer	Washington Redskins
1977	Tom DeLeone	Cleveland Browns
1978	Pat Fischer	Washington Redskins
1979	Bert Jones	Baltimore Colts
1980	Roger Staubach	Dallas Cowboys
1981	Rolf Benirschke	San Diego Chargers
1982	Joe Klecko	New York Jets
1983	Eddie Lee Ivery	Green Bay Packers
1984	Ted Hendricks	Los Angeles Raiders
1985	John Stallworth	Pittsburgh Steelers
1986	Gary Jeter	Los Angeles Rams
1987	William Andrews	Atlanta Falcons
1988	Joe Montana	San Francisco 49ers
1989	Karl Nelson	New York Giants
1990	Tim Krumrie	Cincinnati Bengals
1991	Dan Hampton	Chicago Bears
1992	Mike Utley	Detroit Lions
1993	Mark Bavaro	New York Giants
1994	Joe Montana	Kansas City Chiefs
1995	Dan Marino	Miami Dolphins
1996	Larry Brown	Oakland Raiders
1997	Jim Harbaugh	Indianapolis Colts
1998	Mark Schlereth	Denver Broncos
1999	Dan Reeves	Atlanta Falcons
2000	Bryant Young	San Francisco 49ers
2001	Kerry Collins	New York Giants
2002	Garrison Hearst	San Francisco 49ers
2003	Robert Edwards	Miami Dolphins
2004	Sam Mills	Carolina Panthers
2005	Mark Fields	Carolina Panthers
2006	Tony Dungy	Indianapolis Colts
2007	Drew Brees	New Orleans Saints
2008	Kevin Everett	Buffalo Bills
2009	Matt Bryant	Tampa Bay Buccaneers
2010	Mike Zimmer	Cincinnati Bengals
2011	Mike Heimerdinger	Tennessee Titans
2012	Robert Kraft	New England Patriots
2013	Chuck Pagano	Indianapolis Colts
2014	O. J. Brigance	Baltimore Ravens
2015	Steve Gleason	New Orleans Saints
2016	Eric Berry	Kansas City Chiefs
2017	David Quessenberry	Houston Texans
2018	Marquise Goodwin	San Francisco 49ers
2019	Ryan Shazier	Pittsburgh Steelers
2020	Travis Frederick	Dallas Cowboys
2021	Alex Smith	Washington Football Team
2022	Ron Rivera	Washington Commanders
2023	Damar Hamlin	Buffalo Bills
2024	John Metchie III	Houston Texans
2025	Joe Burrow	Cincinnati Bengals
2026	Brian Flores	Minnesota Vikings

== See also ==
- List of National Football League awards
