= Kevin Everett =

American football player (born 1982)

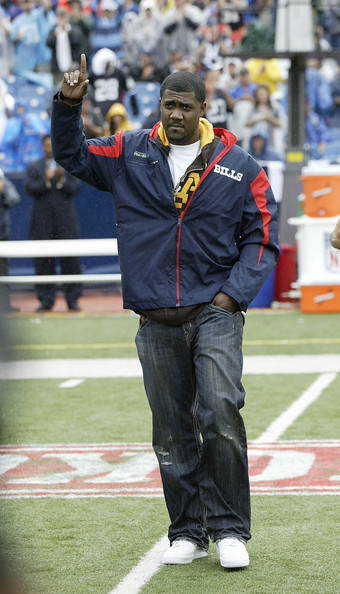
- Everett walking onto the field to receive the George Halas Award in 2008

No. 85
- Position: Tight end

Personal information
- Born: February 5, 1982 (age 44); Port Arthur, Texas, U.S.
- Listed height: 6 ft 4 in (1.93 m)
- Listed weight: 253 lb (115 kg)

Career information
- High school: Thomas Jefferson (Port Arthur, Texas)
- College: Kilgore (2001–2002); Miami (FL) (2003–2004)
- NFL draft: 2005: 3rd round, 86th overall pick

Career history
- Buffalo Bills (2005–2007)

Awards and highlights
- George Halas Award (2008)

Career NFL statistics
- Receptions: 2
- Receiving yards: 4
- Stats at Pro Football Reference

Kevin Everett (born February 5, 1982) is an American former professional football player who was a tight end for the Buffalo Bills of the National Football League (NFL). He was selected by the Bills in the third round of the 2005 NFL draft. He played college football for the Miami Hurricanes after transferring from Kilgore College, where he played on an undefeated team in 2001 under head coach Jimmy Rieves.

On September 9, 2007, Everett's playing career came to an end when he sustained a fracture and dislocation of his cervical spine that his doctors characterized as "life-threatening" the day after the injury, and suggested that it would likely leave him with permanent neurological impairment. However, on September 11, 2007, Everett showed significant movement in his arms and legs, which led doctors to speculate that he might eventually be able to walk again. Indeed, Everett walked in public for the first time at Ralph Wilson Stadium before the home finale against the New York Giants on December 23, 2007.

== Early life ==
Everett attended Thomas Jefferson High School in Port Arthur, Texas, where he was a three-year letterman in football. As a senior, he won Class 5A All-State honors in 2000.

== College career ==
=== Kilgore College ===
Everett attended Kilgore College in Kilgore, Texas for two years, where he was a two-time first-team All-Southwest Junior College football conference pick, ranked the second best junior college player in the nation. As a sophomore, he caught 18 passes for 310 yards and 2 touchdowns.

=== University of Miami ===
He subsequently transferred to the University of Miami. Everett left Miami as the 86th overall pick by the Buffalo Bills in the third round of the 2005 NFL draft.

== Professional career ==
In 2005, Everett became the second tight end the Buffalo Bills brought to the team in as many years, after Tim Euhus was drafted in 2004. Everett struggled with injuries almost from his first day of play with the Bills, having missed the 2005 season after suffering a torn knee ligament on the first day of 2005 minicamp. He was placed on the physically unable to perform list on August 10, 2005, and on injured reserve on November 30.

Everett returned to play in 2006, where he participated on special teams for most of the season. He made his first career start on September 10, 2006, at New England, with the Bills opening in a two-tight end set. On October 1 of that same year, Everett made his first career NFL reception, gaining one yard on a deflected pass.

=== Career-ending injury and impact ===
On September 9, 2007, in Week 1 of the 2007 NFL season, while attempting to tackle Denver Broncos' kickoff return man Domenik Hixon, Everett sustained a neck injury that resulted in his transport off the field by ambulance and emergency surgery at Millard Fillmore Gates Hospital. The injury was described as a cervical spine injury. Following the lengthy surgery, Everett's agent, Brian Overstreet, expressed hope that the injured player would be able to walk, but also reported Everett's movement as "sparse". Aside from his eyes, Everett had not shown any signs of movement on the field after sustaining the injury. It was announced that he would spend one or two days under sedation as doctors evaluate the severity of his injury.

In a televised September 10 press conference, Bills team medical director Dr. John Marzo described Everett's injury as a fracture and dislocation of the cervical spine, resulting in injury to the spinal cord. Orthopedic surgeon Dr. Andrew Cappuccino of Buffalo Spine Surgery, and member of the Bills medical staff, was Everett's attending surgeon, and described the injury to Everett's spinal cord as a "scissoring" or "pinching" injury, caused by dislocation of the third and fourth cervical vertebrae.

Cappuccino repaired a fracture between the third and fourth vertebrae in a procedure that included a bone graft, the insertion of a plate and four screws in Everett's spinal column, and the relief of pressure on the spinal cord. Cappuccino reported that, immediately after the injury, Everett could not feel anything below his shoulders, but the morning after surgery, he had some voluntary movement in his legs, and could feel pressure "down to his feet". However, Cappuccino gave the player a "statistically very small" chance of walking again.

Cappuccino originally stated that he believed Everett would sustain "permanent" neurological damage, and used terms such as "bleak" and "dismal" to describe the outlook for a case he frankly described as "life-threatening", giving Everett less than a 5-10% chance of regaining full utilization of his physical capabilities.

Until September 11, Everett remained on a respirator, but was able to breathe on his own while it was briefly turned off. Cappuccino described Everett's respiratory risks as among the issues he described as "life-threatening" as well as how techniques, such as intravenous methods to reduce Everett's body temperature in an attempt to reduce the swelling, were performed in order to make operation easier. Cappuccino described Everett as an "NFL athlete [with] a warrior's mentality," who showed concern primarily for his family, and who asked doctors to do everything they could for him.

WIVB-TV, the CBS affiliate in Buffalo, reported on September 11 that Everett had regained voluntary movement in his arms and legs, a huge improvement compared to the prognosis given the previous day. Later, ESPN reported that Kevin's doctors were more optimistic with the strength of movements he gained; they claimed that he may be able to possibly walk out of the hospital. Dr. Barth Green, neurological surgery department chair at the University of Miami School of Medicine, said "based on our experience, the fact that he's moving so well, so early after such a catastrophic injury, means he will walk again." When asked about Everett's chances for full recovery, Green replied that, while "not 100 percent predictable", it was "feasible that he could lead a normal life", and credited the hypothermic treatment of intravenous ice-cold saline, administered within minutes of Everett's injury, as having been a significant factor in minimizing the damage. Green referred to this method as an "ice-pack for his spinal cord."

On September 12, a report by Dr. Cappuccino and supporting neurosurgeon Dr. Kevin J. Gibbons was released via press conference that was shown live on ESPN. Gibbons reported that Kevin had been able to slightly move his arms and legs and also wiggle his toes. However, he could not move his hands. When asked about the report that Dr. Barth Green had made the day before in which Green stated that Everett would most likely walk out of the hospital, Cappuccino said that it was just an opinion and that walking out of the hospital was "not a realistic goal" at this point. Gibbons said that right now, the only thing they were concerned about was getting Kevin to walk again. Also in that report, it was stated that Kevin had been taken off the respirator and was able to breathe on his own. On September 14, ESPN reported that Everett had begun to regain movement in his right hand. On September 17, 2007, he regained movement in both hands and was steadily regaining strength in his legs, and on September 20, Dr. Barth Green told the Associated Press that Everett will be able to stand and walk within weeks, and perhaps sooner.

As of October 1, 2007, Everett had been relocated to Houston, near his family and off-season home, where he began a long rehabilitation that doctors believed would lead to him eventually walking again (they are "optimistic") and possibly even making a full recovery. Working in his favor are his age, the incomplete nature of the spinal cord injury, his constitution, and exceptional physical condition at the time of injury, as well as the rapid treatment he received. On October 16, it was reported that Everett has been able to walk "to an extent." During the broadcast it was announced Everett had been released from his Houston hospital to resume rehab as an outpatient.

On December 7, Everett was able to walk on his own power, but he did not have full movement. Everett appeared on the cover of the December 17 issue of Sports Illustrated, which contains an article on his injury, rehabilitation and recovery. On Sunday, December 23, 2007, he walked publicly on the field of Ralph Wilson Stadium in front of a number of fans for the home finale against the New York Giants. Coincidentally, Domenik Hixon was on the Giants at the time of the game after being released by the Broncos. On January 31, 2008, Everett accepted NFL commissioner Roger Goodell's invitation to sit with him at Super Bowl XLII. That day, he also appeared on Oprah, clearly able to walk under his own power.

On April 9, 2008, Everett underwent more surgery to relieve persistent pain in his neck. On May 12, 2008, Everett was waived by the Bills to allow him to be eligible to immediately apply for lifetime disability benefits. The Bills kept Everett on the active roster prior to waiving him to ensure that he completed three full NFL seasons, allowing him to qualify for a full pension. On July 20, 2008, Everett was awarded the Jimmy V Award for perseverance at the 2008 ESPY Awards for his heroic recovery from neck injury that threatened his chances of walking again, defying the odds and "never giving up"—something Jim Valvano said himself at the 1993 ESPY Awards. Everett was the grand marshal and gave the command to start engines for NASCAR Nationwide Series' Zippo 200 at Watkins Glen International on August 9, 2008. He also received the George Halas Award.

In an article on the official Bills website from 2012, Everett was interviewed in a story titled Kevin Everett Five Years Later: "These five years shot by so fast, it's unbelievable, to tell you the truth. They've been fast because I've been staying busy. I'm glad people still remember me," he said. "I wish they could remember me for making touchdowns and making big plays for the Bills, but they still remember me as a person and what I went through in my life. So I very much appreciate that and I love every fan out there that supports me.".
