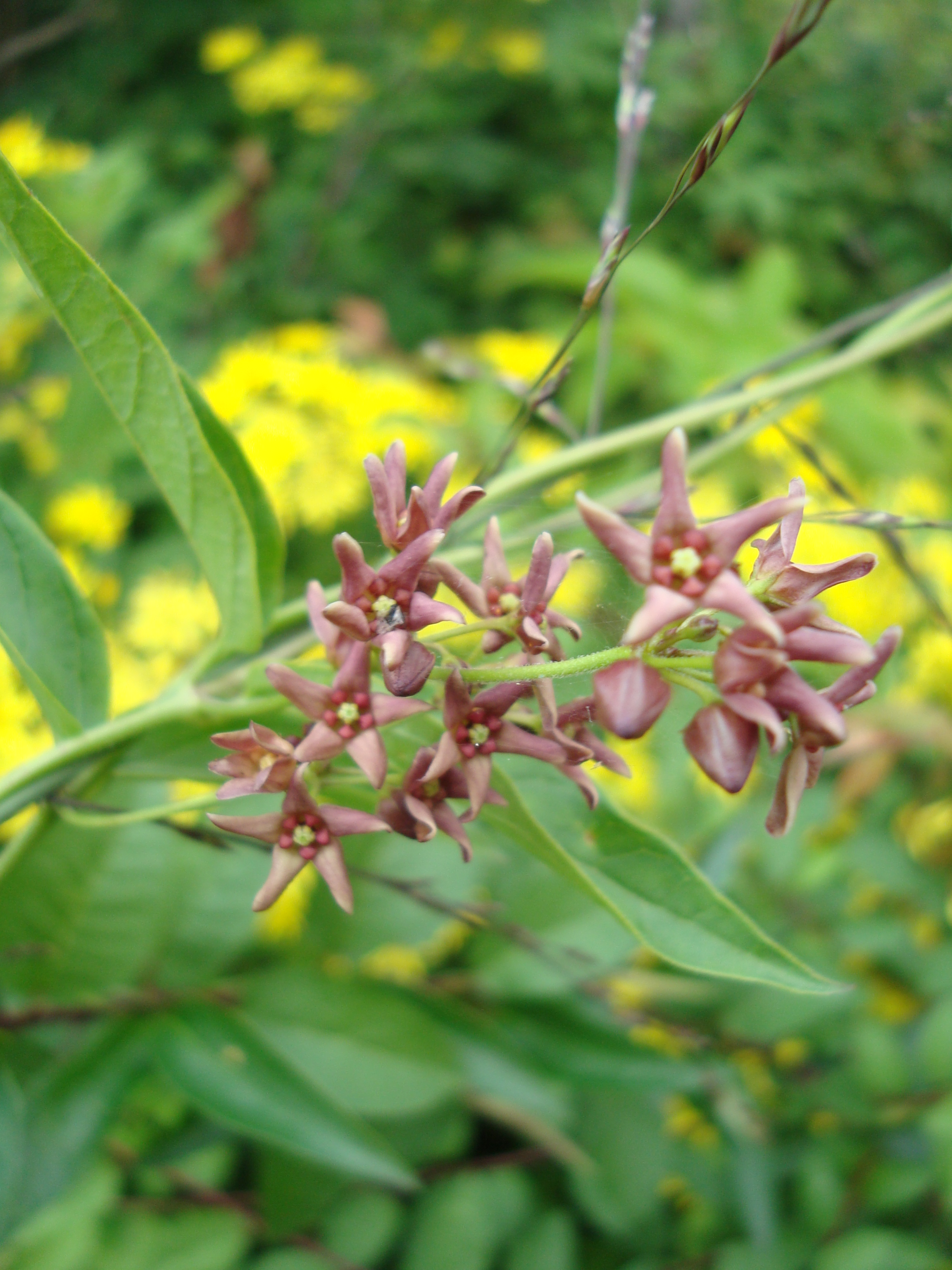

Scientific classification
- Kingdom: Plantae
- Clade: Tracheophytes
- Clade: Angiosperms
- Clade: Eudicots
- Clade: Asterids
- Order: Gentianales
- Family: Apocynaceae
- Genus: Vincetoxicum
- Species: V. rossicum

Binomial name
- Vincetoxicum rossicum (Kleopow) Barbar.

Synonyms
- Cynanchum rossicum (Kleopow) Borhidi

= Vincetoxicum rossicum =

Species of plant

Vincetoxicum rossicum is a flowering plant in the family Apocynaceae. It is a perennial herb native to southern Europe and is a highly invasive plant growing in all of the Eastern United States, in the mid west, and southern Ontario and Quebec in Canada. It has several common names including swallowwort, pale swallowwort, and dog-strangling vine; though it does not actually strangle dogs, it can “strangle” native plants and small trees if it is in dense patches. There has historically been much confusion about the genus it belongs to, with authors placing it within Vincetoxicum and others within Cynanchum, but recent molecular and chemical analyses have shown it to belong in the genus Vincetoxicum.

== Description ==
=== Leaves ===
The leaves of the pale swallowwort are larger when they are closer to the stem and decrease in size as they move away from the stem. They are in the shape of an ellipse or an oval and contain smooth margins and major veins underneath. The glossy, dark green leaves grow opposite on the stem and are ovate to elliptical. The flowers appear near the top of the plant and grow on stalks that come from the leaf axils.

=== Flowers ===
The buds of the flowers have a pointed apex and are ovoid to conoidal. Also, petals that are unopened are twisted. The diameter of the flowers is 5–7 mm and they are 5-parted. Some of the petals are 3–5 mm in long and do not have hair. The margins of the petals are 0.05–0.15 mm wide and they are typically translucent. The 5-lobed corona is typically pink, red-brown or maroon, which is the same color as the corolla. The corona is sometimes seen as a lighter pink, orange or yellow. The fruits of the Vincetoxicum rossicum are 4–7 cm long and each flower typically contains two fruits. The seeds of the fruit are oblong and are either concaved or flattened on one side and convex on the other side. The seed color varies from light to dark brown. Each stalk has 5 to 20 flowers. The flowers are dark purple or dark brown.

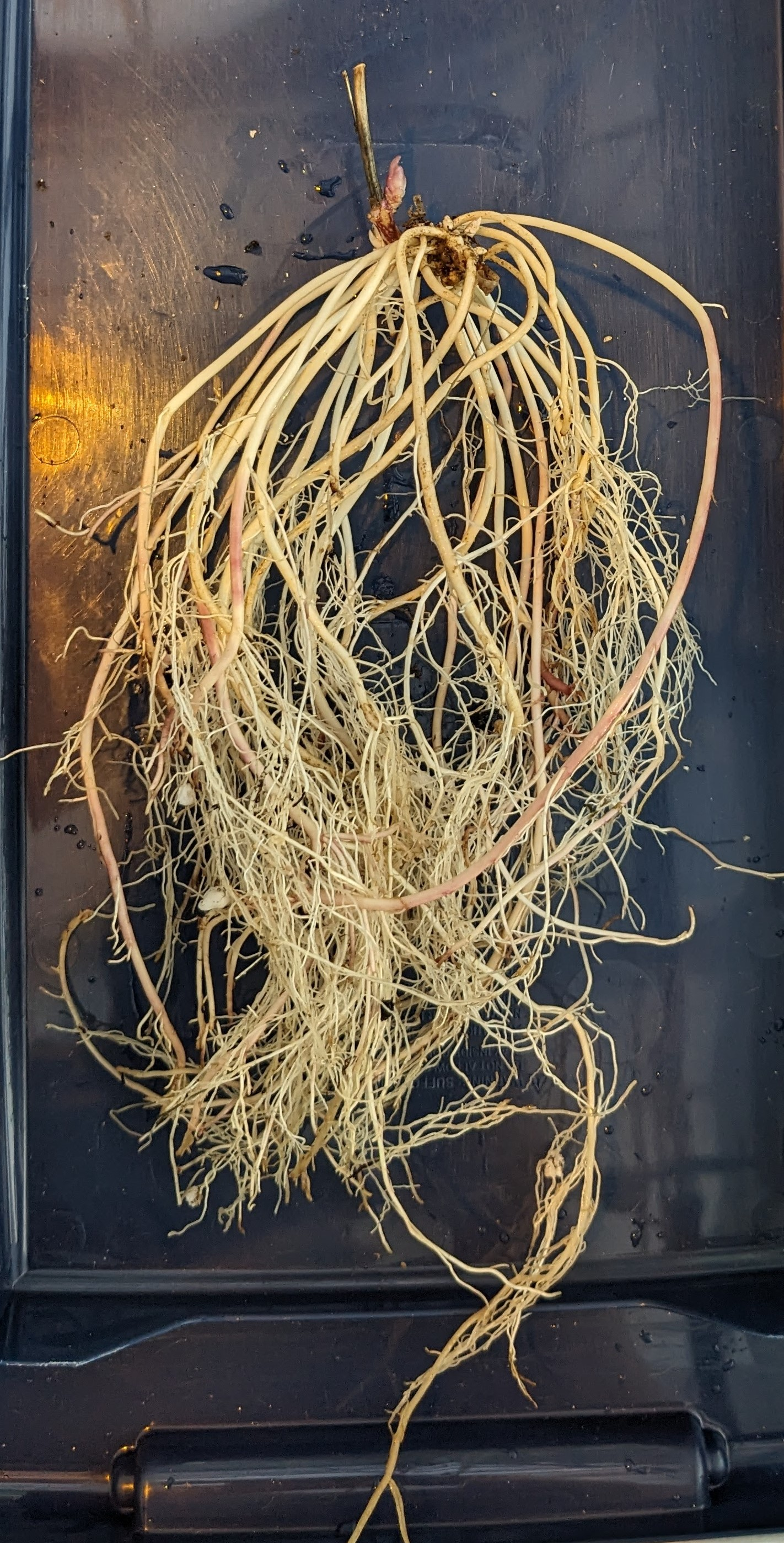
Roots of V. rossicum (unearthed and washed) in February after overwintering in upstate NY winter conditions.

=== Roots ===
It is a twining vine that grows to heights of 60–200 cm (2.0–6.6 ft). The roots of the pale swallowwort are thick. The rootstalk makes a rhizome shape with its roots. Stems are found intertwined in dense patches of plants. They will grow onto other plants when they are alone in order to have structural support. After a year of growth, the stem turns light brown and resembles a decaying stem and stops growing.

== Reproduction ==
Vincetoxicum rossicum reproduces by spreading its seeds through wind dispersal and through vegetative production. Since it is multiembryonic, it allows the seeds to cover more ground and allows the pale swallowwort to have a high reproductive rate. Intermediate light is the best light source for the pale swallowwort to reproduce and grow. Though that light is not necessarily required, it does produce the best outcome. Typically this invasive species is found in dense vegetation, which allows it to rapidly grow with its multiembryonic seeds. Since this invasive species is a vine, it grows best when it attaches to other plants and uses it as a support beam.

== Survival ==
These seeds are polyembryonic and typically contain two embryos but there have been observations of up to eight embryos. When there are multiple embryos released into an environment, they have a greater chance of surviving when damage is done to the environment. This makes the survival rate of the pale swallowwort to be very high and in there lies the problem as to why this invasive species is problematic.

Vincetoxicum rossicum can tolerate drought conditions with low soil moisture by allocating a high proportion of its resources to belowground biomass in the form of its roots.V. rossicum employ a sit-and-wait strategy in which it will reallocate the resources invested into the roots once drought conditions subside and environmental conditions become more favourable.

== Distribution ==
Vincetoxicum rossicum is native to Ukraine and southwestern European Russia and was introduced as an ornamental plant in North America, where it is considered invasive, particularly in the Great Lakes Basin. It is commonly found along with poison ivy plants.

== Invasive species ==
Vincetoxicum rossicum is a highly invasive plant growing in all of the Eastern United States, and commonly found in the mid west. It is invading environments in Michigan, Pennsylvania, Missouri, Kansas, Illinois, and New York. In Canada, it is found in Southern Ontario and Quebec. It has been reported in British Columbia but is not currently known to be present there. There are currently no control methods that stop Vincetoxicum rossicum from spreading. In Canada, the release of a moth, Hypena opulenta, which feeds exclusively on Vincetoxicum spp., was authorized in 2013.

It is of particular concern in the Great Lakes Basin where it is disturbing native birds and plants. It is also a threat to some butterflies, especially the Monarch, because it interferes with the native hosts and acts as an ecological "sink". If the native plants are replaced by Vincetoxicum rossicum, it may affect the butterflies and other insects that use those plants as hosts, including the endangered migratory monarch butterfly.
