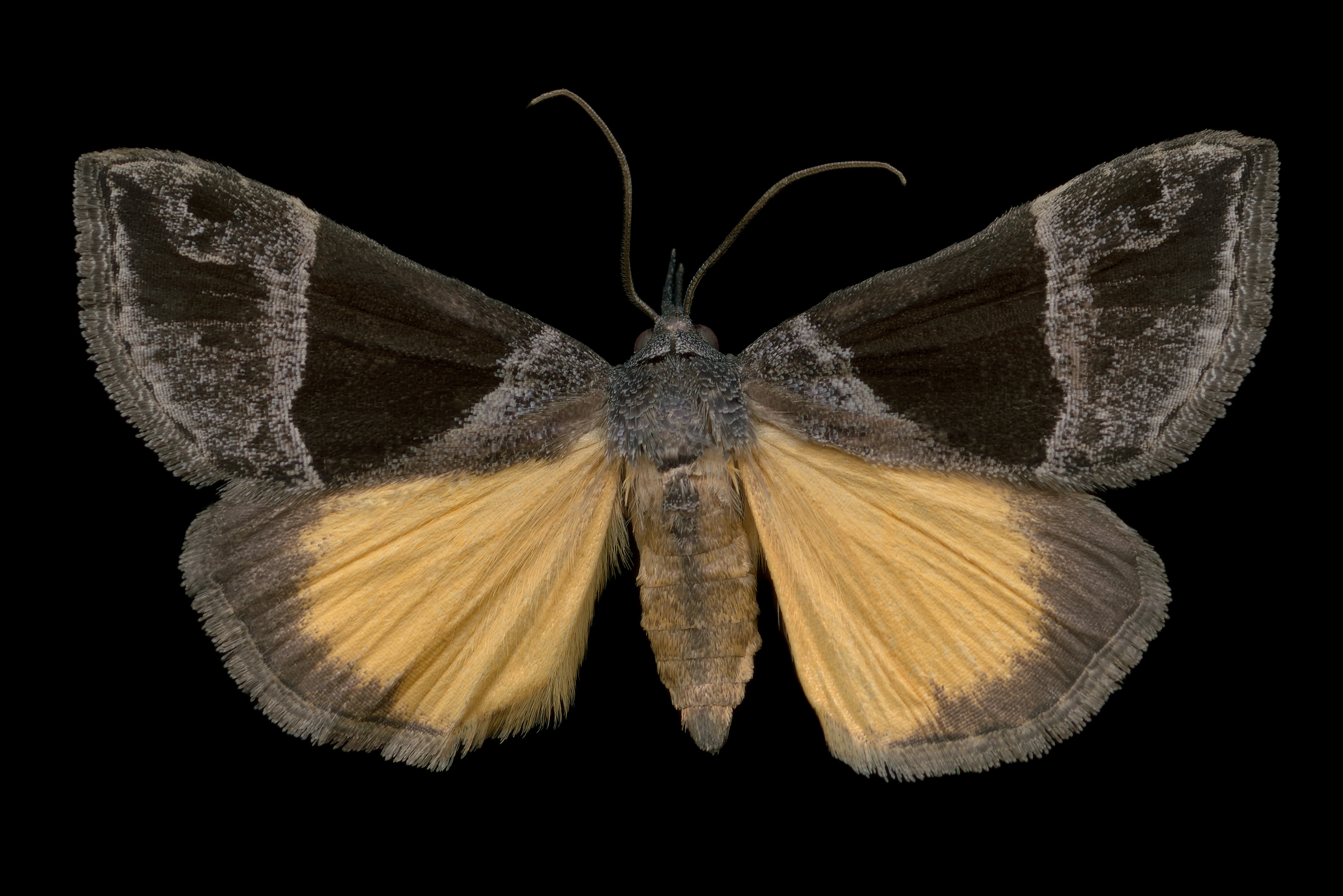
- Hypena opulenta, adult

Scientific classification
- Domain: Eukaryota
- Kingdom: Animalia
- Phylum: Arthropoda
- Class: Insecta
- Order: Lepidoptera
- Superfamily: Noctuoidea
- Family: Erebidae
- Genus: Hypena
- Species: H. opulenta

Binomial name
- Hypena opulenta (Christoph, 1877)

Synonyms
- Bomolocha opulenta Christoph 1877

= Hypena opulenta =

Species of moth

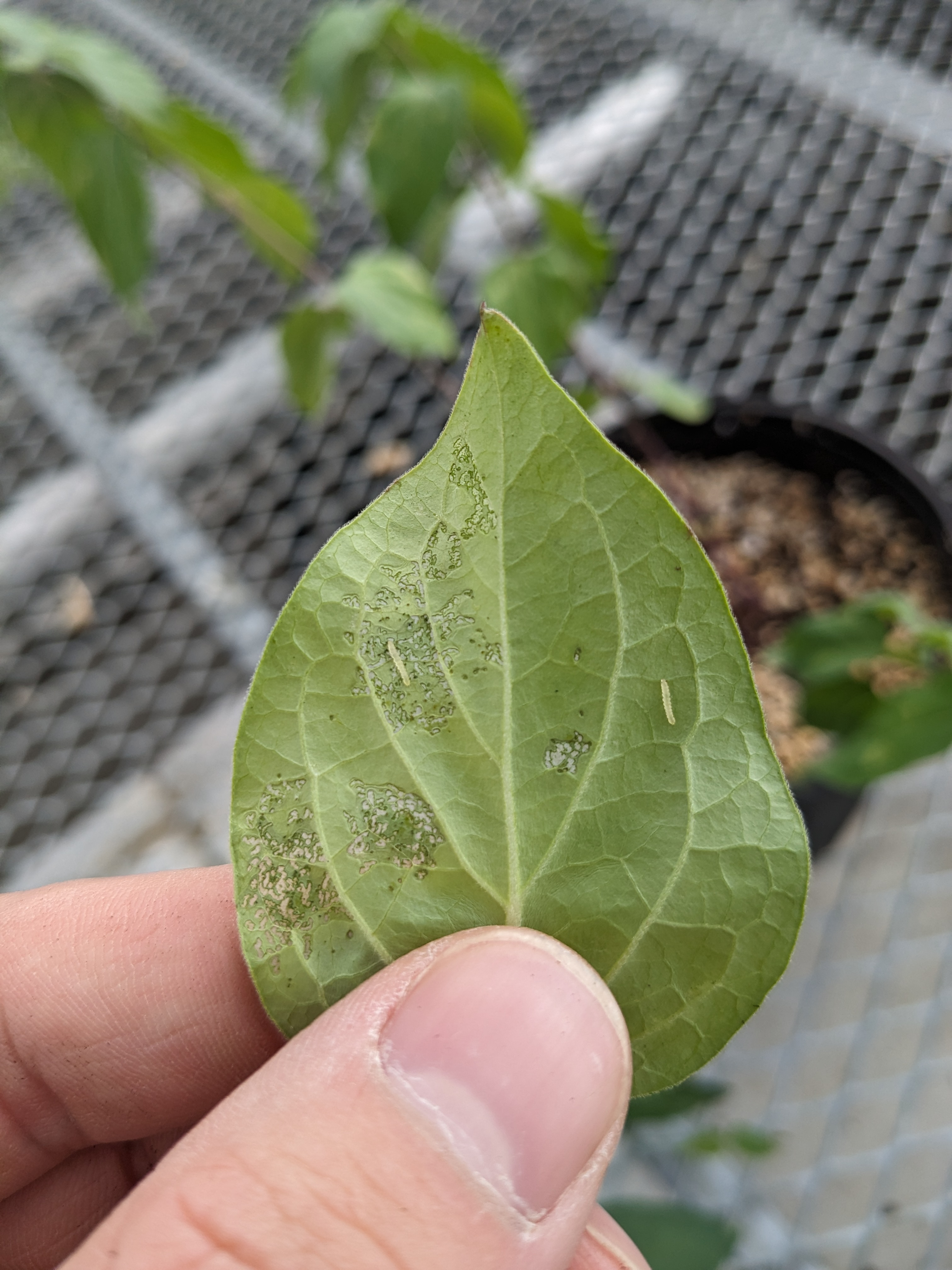
First instar H. opulenta larvae and the characteristic "window-pane" damage on underside of Vincetoxicum hirundinaria leaf.

Hypena opulenta is a moth in the family Erebidae (formerly in the family Noctuidae). The species was first described by Hugo Theodor Christoph in 1877. Its reported native range expands from Eastern Europe Ukraine and Russia, south to Afghanistan, Iran, and Syria. In 2013, the moth larva was approved for release in North America to act as a biocontrol agent for invasive swallow-wort plants, Vincetoxicum rossicum and Vincetoxicum nigrum.

== Life cycle ==
Hypena opulenta overwinters as pupa. Moths emerge in late spring. The eggs are deposited on the under and upper sides of host plants along main veins. Larvae go through five instars and take four to six weeks to develop. They have been reported to feed on Vincetoxicum rossicum and Vincetoxicum scandens in the wild, and to also be able to develop on Vincetoxicum nigrum and Vincetoxicum hirundinaria in the laboratory. Pupation occurs either on the host plant within leaves tied with silk or on the ground within the leaf litter. Hypena opulenta has a facultative diapause and is believed to usually undergo two generations per year. Overwintering is triggered by short photoperiod.
