= Andrew Cappuccino =

American orthopedic surgeon

Andrew Cappuccino is the orthopedic surgeon who treated Buffalo Bills tight end Kevin Everett for his cervical spine injury. Cappuccino's use of induced hypothermia garnered national headlines for the technique.

Cappuccino received a dual BES degree from Johns Hopkins University in Material Science and Biomedical Engineering, where he also played lacrosse for the Blue Jays. He then went on to medical school at the State University of New York at Buffalo. He completed his orthopedic surgery residency at Monmouth Medical Center and then returned to Johns Hopkins to complete specialty training in spine surgery with Dr. Paul McAfee. He was among the first doctors approved to perform artificial disc replacement, and heads Buffalo Spine Surgery. He is a Charter Diplomate of the American Board of Spine Surgery, and is also a Fellow of the American Academy of Orthopedic Surgeons, and a Fellow of the American College of Surgeons and continues to be an investigator in studies and trials dedicated to improving spinal surgery outcomes and technologies.

Cappuccino teaches spine surgery techniques internationally, and has operated in Europe, South America, Australia, and in Asia and Africa as a guest spine surgeon. He has authored scientific and medical articles and textbooks about spine surgery. He has served on the editorial board for the North American Spine Society Annual Meeting. Cappuccino was honored by Business First and selected as Western New York's "Health Care Hero 2005" for his contributions as an innovator of medical technology.

Cappuccino has served on the medical staff of the Buffalo Bills for many years, and in this capacity was the treating surgeon for Kevin Everett, the Bills tight end who suffered a cervical fracture and dislocation (broken neck) in the 2007 home-opener against the Denver Broncos.

== Personal ==
He is a father of six and is married to Helen Cappuccino, MD, a breast surgeon at Roswell Park Comprehensive Cancer Center. His civic and recreational activities include performing operations on needy children from abroad, and serving as a celebrity chef for fundraisers (Ilio DiPaolo Scholarship Fund). He is a member of the Confrérie de la Chaîne des Rôtisseurs. His daughter Elizabeth is a film and television actress.
