= The Last House on the Left (2009 soundtrack) =

The Last House on the Left (Original Motion Picture Score)

Film score by John Murphy
- Released: March 10, 2009
- Recorded: 2008–2009
- Studio: Bastyr Chapel, Bastyr University, Kenmore, Washington; Igloo Studios, Burbank, California
- Genre: Film score
- Length: 46:35
- Label: La-La Land Records
- Producer: John Murphy

John Murphy chronology
| Sunshine (2008) | The Last House on the Left (2009) | Janky Promoters (2009) |

The Last House on the Left (Original Motion Picture Score) is the film score composed by John Murphy to the 2009 film The Last House on the Left directed by Dennis Iliadis, which is the remake of the 1972 film of the same name. The film score was released by La-La Land Records on March 10, 2009.

== Development ==
John Murphy composed the film score. He was interested in the project owing to Iliadis' involvement after he watched his debut film Hardcore (2004) and noticed the use of music. He felt that the director did not want a typical horror film score, allowing him to experiment and also had the European sensibility which he had a likeness to it. After a formal meet with the director, he discussed on how horror scores becoming generic and predictable unlike the olden times and wanted to follow the similar approach, by constructing the score in a more organic and melodic way, referencing Rosemary's Baby (1968). However, when Iliadis shown the film, it did not have such elements and "had this kinda cool European pacing and it just looked beautiful."

In the liner notes of the CD, Murphy noted that "the combination of beauty and dread, elements that are presented in this film, are specific components that you enjoy writing for". Speaking to Tom Hoover in his Keeping Score book, Murphy attributed it to the personality problem, where he tends towards in extremes in art form, while liking the melodical and lyrical stuff of Ennio Morricone, John Barry and Nino Rota, he was also drawn to the darker and more atonal stuff. With certain films, he thought he can "bring more to the table [while] trying to hit those two polar opposites" as at some point it becomes the same thing. He noted that he can sense its beauty cinematically if the music is "dark and unsympathetic" and feeling more dread if it is "innocent and lyrical". Murphy noted this juxtaposition heightens the emotional tonality in comparison to the events happening on screen. Citing Morricone and Bernard Herrmann, on how they balanced this juxtaposition, Murphy also wanted to achieve these two extremes while writing the score.

== Track listing ==
| No. | Title | Length |
|---|---|---|
| 1. | "Opening Titles" | 1:40 |
| 2. | "The Crossing" | 2:36 |
| 3. | "The Pool" | 0:56 |
| 4. | "The House" | 1:31 |
| 5. | "The Boathouse" | 2:04 |
| 6. | "Getting Stoned" | 1:07 |
| 7. | "In the Woods" | 4:01 |
| 8. | "Are You Ready to Be a Man?" | 2:30 |
| 9. | "Killing Paige" | 1:02 |
| 10. | "After the Assault" | 3:20 |
| 11. | "Dead in the Water" | 2:15 |
| 12. | "Candles" | 3:57 |
| 13. | "Saving Mari" | 5:00 |
| 14. | "Going to the Guest House" | 2:52 |
| 15. | "Looking for Krug" | 3:28 |
| 16. | "John V Krug" | 2:32 |
| 17. | "The End" | 4:10 |
| 18. | "Opening Titles" (Alt.) | 1:34 |
| Total length: | | 46:35 |

== Reception ==
Jonathan Broxton of Movie Music UK wrote "Overall, The Last House on the Left is a score which is wholly successful in terms creating a mood of tension and dread, in addition to having a surprising amount of generally very good and occasionally very attractive orchestral suspense writing, and for this Murphy should rightly be commended, but it's still not something I'd want to listen to on a regular basis." Thomas Glorieux of Maintitles wrote "The Last House on the Left is by no means the score John Murphy fans must have, nor it is one of his best. But it functions very well inside the movie, heightening the emotion perfectly in the film. And when listening to it, it is very easy to digest and accept it as a mere background experience that gets the job done. It doesn't have the whopper moments a 28 Weeks Later or god forbid Sunshine has, but it is okay for an occasional background spin."

Dennis Harvey of Variety called the score "dreadful". Jim Vejvoda of IGN wrote "John Murphy delivers a chilling score". Gabe Powers of Genre Grinder wrote "John Murphy's eerie score keeps the stereo channels engaged, bolstering the dreamy, yet subjective feel of the camerawork with low-key strings, guitars, and synth that builds to a wall of noise where needed." JimmyO of JoBlo.com wrote "The score by John Murphy represents the film so perfectly, that it really feels as if it lives and breathes as the circumstances go from dire to deadly. But no clashing symbols or loud shrieks of violins to let you know that you should jump can be found here, and yes, in my book that is a great thing." Jeannette Catsoulis of The New York Times described the score as "bone-chilling". Reviewer based at WhatCulture wrote "There is a positive word for John Murphy's excellent score - it gives the film a lift it doesn't deserve. It is not a patch however on David Hess' original music that juxtaposed ballads with folk style accompaniments with violent imagery."

== Personnel ==
Credits adapted from liner notes:

- Music composer and producer – John Murphy
- Orchestrator – Stephen Coleman
- Conductor – Joe Krinkl
- Programming – Scott Somerville, Tyler Barton
- Sound design – Brent Arrowood
- Recordist – Brian Valentino, Kory Kruckenberg
- Recording – Scott Somerville, Tyler Barton
- Mixing – Gustavo Borner, Nicholai Baxter, Tyler Barton
- Mastering – James Nelson
- Music editor – Brian Richards, James Nelson
- Music supervisor – Ed Gerrard
- Music contractor – David Sabee, Simon James
- Copyist – Robert Puff
- Art direction – David C. Fein
