= Red Dawn (2012 film) =

2012 American action war film directed by Dan Bradley

- Theatrical release poster
- Directed by: Dan Bradley
- Screenplay by: Carl Ellsworth; Jeremy Passmore
- Based on: Red Dawn by Kevin Reynolds and John Milius
- Produced by: Beau Flynn; Tripp Vinson
- Starring: Chris Hemsworth; Josh Peck; Josh Hutcherson; Adrianne Palicki; Isabel Lucas; Connor Cruise; Jeffrey Dean Morgan
- Cinematography: Mitchell Amundsen
- Edited by: Richard Pearson
- Music by: Ramin Djawadi
- Production company: Contrafilm
- Distributed by: FilmDistrict (United States); FilmNation Entertainment (International)
- Release dates: September 27, 2012 (Fantastic Fest); November 21, 2012 (United States)
- Running time: 93 minutes
- Country: United States
- Language: English
- Budget: $65 million
- Box office: $51 million

Red Dawn is a 2012 American action war film directed by Dan Bradley and written by Carl Ellsworth and Jeremy Passmore. It is a remake of the 1984 film of the same name. The film stars Chris Hemsworth, Josh Peck, Josh Hutcherson, Adrianne Palicki, Isabel Lucas, and Jeffrey Dean Morgan. The film centers on a group of teenage guerrillas defending their hometown from a North Korean invasion.

Metro-Goldwyn-Mayer announced its intention to remake Red Dawn in May 2008 and subsequently hired Bradley and Ellsworth. The principal characters were cast the following year and the film went into production in September 2009 in Mount Clemens, Michigan. Originally scheduled to be released on September 24, 2010, and November 24, 2010, the film was shelved because of MGM's financial troubles. While in post-production, the invading army and antagonists were changed from Chinese to North Korean in order to maintain access to the Chinese box office, though the film was still not released in China.

Because of MGM's bankruptcy, the distribution rights were sold to FilmDistrict in September 2011 and the film was released in the United States on November 21, 2012, to mostly negative reviews. It grossed $51 million against its $65 million budget.

== Plot ==
In the aftermath of a financial crisis in the European Union and the weakening of NATO, collaborative dealings have occurred between a progressively militant North Korea and an ultranationalist Russia. The American mainland has become largely undefended from the increased deployment of U.S. troops abroad, and American infrastructure is increasingly vulnerable to cyberattacks.

U.S. Marine Jed Eckert is on home leave in Spokane, Washington, where he reunites with his father, Spokane Police Sergeant Tom Eckert, his brother, Matt Eckert, and his childhood friend Toni Walsh and her cousin Erica Martin, Matt's girlfriend. Matt, the quarterback for his football team, blew a playoff game because of his cowboy antics. After the city suffers a blackout, Jed and Matt witness North Korean paratroopers and transport aircraft invading the town. Their father tells them to escape to their cabin in the woods while he helps the townspeople. They're joined by Matt's friends Robert Kitner, Daryl Jenkins, Danny Jackson, siblings Julie and Greg Goodyear, a stranger named Pete, and his buddy. After Erica is captured, Toni joins them as well.

As the group debates whether to surrender or resist, Pete and his buddy steal their supplies, inadvertently betraying their position. Captain Cho and his soldiers order Daryl's father, the mayor, to convince the group to surrender. Sergeant Eckert refuses to cooperate and is executed by Cho after encouraging them to resist, and the cabin is then torched to the ground. Jed is determined to fight back, and the group joins him. Under Jed's training, the group learns to hunt for survival, use weapons, and establish a base in an abandoned mine. The group, naming themselves the Wolverines after their school mascot, stage guerrilla attacks on soldiers and collaborators, including Pete, who is killed in a bombing. During a plot to eliminate the leadership during a rally, Jed soon finds Russian Spetsnaz working with the North Korean army. However, Cho discovers their bomb, compromising their mission. Matt recklessly strays from the plan to free Erica, who was on a prison transport, but Greg is killed in the process. The North Koreans find their location and retaliate with artillery fire, destroying their base, and killing Danny and Julie.

The surviving Wolverines later encounter U.S. Marines Sergeant Major Andrew Tanner, Corporal Smith, and Sergeant Hodges, who reveal that a Russian-backed North Korean forces used a EMP weapon to disable the U.S. electrical grid and crippled the military forces, immediately followed by landings along the east and west coasts. American counterattacks eventually halted their advances, leaving a large area stretching from the Rocky Mountains to the Appalachians as "Free America" while pockets of resistance continue to oppose the invasion. The Wolverines learn that Captain Cho's suitcase contains an EMP-resistant radiotelephone, and if they can steal it, the U.S. command could use it to their advantage in a counter-offensive. The Wolverines help the Marines infiltrate the police department, which is being used as the North Koreans' operation center, and steal the suitcase. Jed kills Cho, though Hodges is killed in the firefight.

The Wolverines and Marines regroup at a safe house with the suitcase, but Jed is killed in an ambush by Russian Spetsnaz. As Matt and the group escape with the suitcase, Robert discovers that Daryl was tagged by the Russians with a subcutaneous tracking device during the police station raid. Knowing he cannot go with them, Daryl stays behind to buy time for the others as they head to the Marines' extraction point. Tanner and Smith depart with the suitcase, while the remaining Wolverines stay to continue fighting under Matt's leadership.

== Cast ==
- Chris Hemsworth as Jed Eckert, a Marine and older brother of Matt, later the founder of the Wolverines
- Josh Peck as Matt Eckert, younger brother of Jed and son of Tom Eckert, a high school football quarterback who fights for the Wolverines
- Josh Hutcherson as Robert Kitner, Jed's best friend who fights for the Wolverines
- Adrianne Palicki as Toni Walsh, Jed's high school sweetheart who fights for the Wolverines
- Isabel Lucas as Erica Martin, Matt's girlfriend and cheerleading captain
- Connor Cruise as Daryl Jenkins, the mayor's son, who fights for the Wolverines
- Alyssa Diaz as Julie Goodyear, a tourist from San Diego who fights for the Wolverines along with her brother, Greg
- Brett Cullen as Sgt. Tom Eckert, father to Jed and Matt who serves as a police officer in Spokane
- Edwin Hodge as Danny Jackson, Matt's teammate who joined the Wolverines
- Julian Alcaraz as Greg Goodyear, a tourist from San Diego who fights for the Wolverines along with his sister, Julie
- Will Yun Lee as Captain Il-Ho Cho, a Commander of the Korean People's Army who was made the Prefect of Spokane
- Michael Beach as Mayor Jenkins, Mayor of Spokane who is Daryl's father
- Jeffrey Dean Morgan as Sergeant Major Andrew Tanner, leader of the United States Marine Corps resistance unit
- Matt Gerald as Sergeant Hodges, a Marine and assistant to Sergeant Major Tanner
- Kenneth Choi as Corporal Smith, a Korean-American Marine with Tanner
- Steve Lenz as Pete, a troublemaker who stole from the Eckharts and began collaborating with the North Koreans
- Michael A. Knight as Colonel Ivanov, the Russian Spetsnaz Commanding Officer posted in Spokane

== Production ==
In May 2008, at the Festival de Cannes, Harry Sloan and Mary Parent from MGM announced that a remake of Red Dawn was in the early stages of pre-production, with the remake due to be directed by Dan Bradley, who had previously worked as a second unit director and stunt coordinator on films such as The Bourne Ultimatum, Spider-Man 3, Independence Day, and Quantum of Solace. MGM subsequently announced that Red Dawn would be remade "keeping in mind the post-9/11 world that we're in". Later the same month, MGM announced that Dan Bradley had been confirmed as the director with Carl Ellsworth, screenwriter of Red Eye and Disturbia, writing the updated screenplay. Ellsworth worked from a story written by Jeremy Passmore. Vincent Newman (A Man Apart) was announced as the producer. Australian Chris Hemsworth was cast in a lead role: other cast members include Josh Peck, Adrianne Palicki, Josh Hutcherson, Isabel Lucas, Edwin Hodge, and Connor Cruise.

Principal photography began September 2009 in Mount Clemens, Michigan. The closed Notre Dame High School in Harper Woods, Michigan (Greater Detroit) was used as a filming location. Mark Binelli, author of Detroit City is the Place to Be, wrote that the school cafeteria was used as the catering hall for the employees. According to photographs taken on set, the film features propaganda pamphlets, posters, and banners featuring People's Liberation Army symbols, such as the August 1 star. The posters attempt to garner support for a Chinese occupation, with slogans such as "Rebuilding Your Reputation", "Repairing Your Economy", and "Fighting Corporate Corruption".

In June 2010, release of the film was delayed by MGM's financial difficulties. The delay came amid growing controversy in China after excerpts of the script were leaked on the website The Awl. The film drew sharp criticism from the Global Times, one of the leading Chinese state-run newspapers, with headlines such as "U.S. reshoots Cold War movie to demonize China" and "American movie plants hostile seeds against China". One of the articles stated: "China can still feel U.S. distrust and fear, especially among its people. Americans' suspicions about China are the best ground for the hawks to disseminate fear and doubt, which is the biggest concern with the movie, Red Dawn." After reading the script, the original film's director, John Milius denounced it as "terrible", and criticized it for choosing to make the antagonists Chinese, stating that there was "only one example in 4,000 years of Chinese territorial adventurism, and that was in 1979, when they invaded Vietnam, and to put it mildly they got their [butts] handed to them..."

In January 2011, the first cast photo was released along with news that MGM would release the film once their Chapter 11 restructuring was completed. Red Dawn was one of three already completed MGM projects scheduled to be released in 2011.

The original storyline included Chinese "repossession" after the US defaults on loans.

In March 2011, the Los Angeles Times reported that MGM would change the villains in its Red Dawn remake from Chinese to North Korean in order to maintain access to China's lucrative box office. The changes were anticipated to cost less than $1 million and "involve changing an opening sequence summarizing the story's fictional backdrop, re-editing two scenes", and using digital technology to transform many Chinese symbols to Korean." The film's producer Trip Vinson stated: "We were initially very reluctant to make any changes, but after careful consideration we constructed a way to make a scarier, smarter and more dangerous Red Dawn that we believe improves the movie."

== Soundtrack ==
Red Dawn: Original Motion Picture Soundtrack

Soundtrack album by Ramin Djawadi
- Released: November 19, 2012
- Genre: Film score
- Length: 51:18
- Label: Varèse Sarabande
- Producer: Ramin Djawadi

Ramin Djawadi chronology
Person of Interest (2012)	Red Dawn: Original Motion Picture Soundtrack (2012)	Game of Thrones: Season 3 (2013)

Ramin Djawadi composed the score to the film.

=== Track listing ===
All music by Ramin Djawadi.

No.	Title	Length
1.	"Red Dawn"	2:48
2.	"Wolverines"	2:07
3.	"Invasion"	4:14
4.	"Execution"	2:58
5.	"I'm Gonna Fight"	3:07
6.	"We Need Better Weapons"	2:16
7.	"What Do You Miss"	0:58
8.	"Victory"	1:00
9.	"Brothers"	1:25
10.	"Counter Insurgency"	3:59
11.	"A Terrible Haircut"	1:36
12.	"Even A Small Flea Can Drive A Big Dog Crazy"	2:29
13.	"Erica"	1:36
14.	"Surveying The Damage"	1:08
15.	"Preparing The Cabin"	1:46
16.	"Follow The Wires"	8:23
17.	"Daryl's Sacrifice"	2:07
18.	"A Marine And His Rifle"	2:46
19.	"Jed's Death"	2:06
20.	"Finale"	2:29
Total length:		51:18

== Release ==
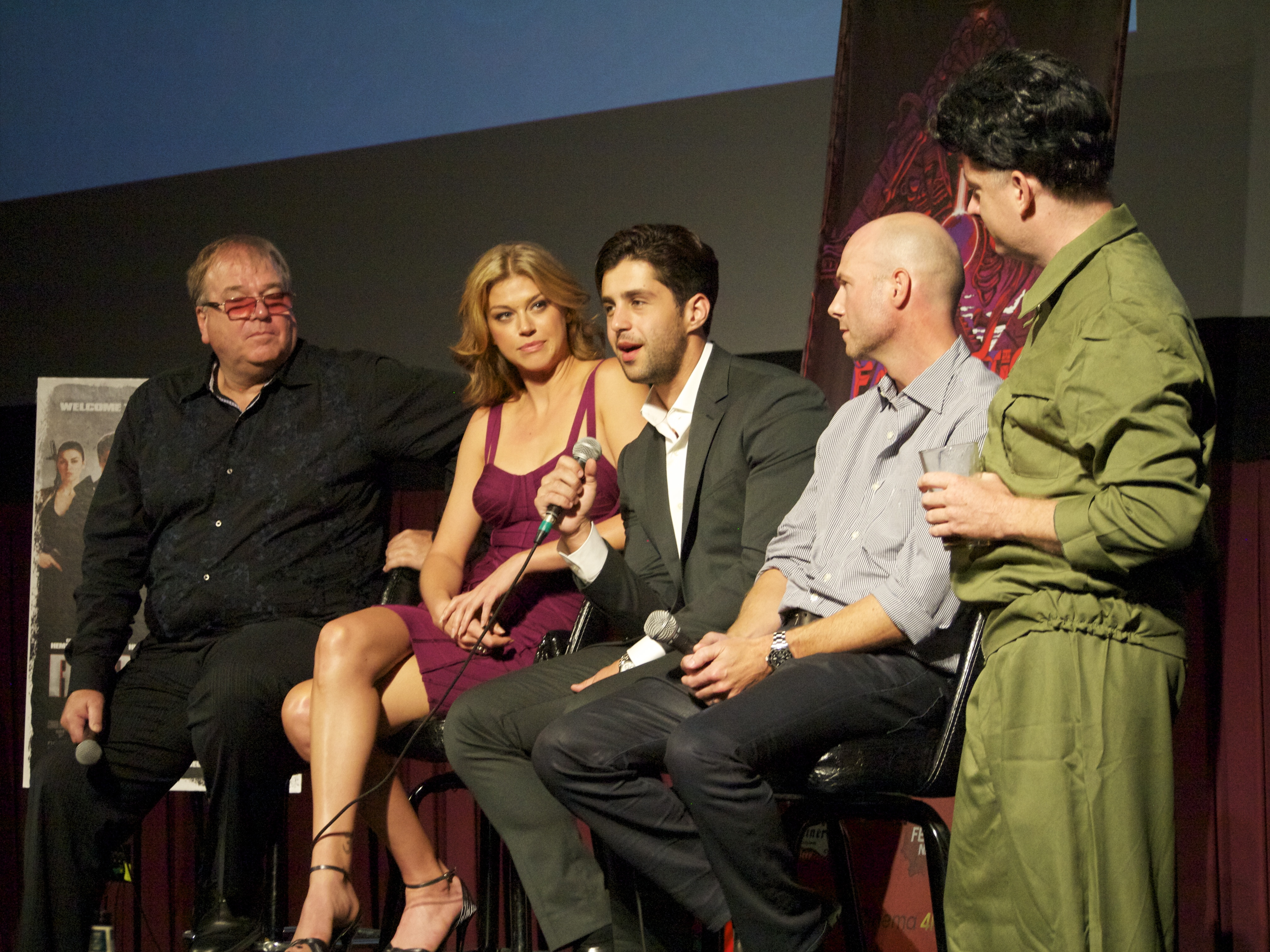
Dan Bradley, Adrianne Palicki, Josh Peck, Tripp Vinson and Fantastic Fest founder Tim League at the world premiere of Red Dawn in Austin, Texas

In September 2011, it was reported that Metro-Goldwyn-Mayer was finalizing a deal with the independent studio FilmDistrict to distribute the film in the United States. In December 2011, FilmDistrict reached a deal to distribute its 2012 films including Red Dawn through Open Road Films. It was originally set to be released on November 2, 2012, but was pushed back to November 21, 2012. In September 2012, it was announced that the film would premiere on September 27, 2012, at the Alamo Drafthouse Cinema in Austin, Texas, closing out the Fantastic Fest film festival.

Red Dawn opened in theaters in the United States on November 21, 2012. The film earned $7.4 million in its first two days and finished in seventh place, earning $14.6 million in its first weekend. The film closed in theaters on February 21, 2013, grossing a total $50.9 million worldwide.

Red Dawn was released on DVD and Blu-ray on March 5, 2013, by 20th Century Fox Home Entertainment.

== Reception ==
Review aggregator Rotten Tomatoes reports 15% of 143 critics gave the film a positive review. The site's critical consensus reads, "The rebooted Red Dawn lacks the original's topicality, but at least pays tribute in delivering the same short shrift to character development and general logic." On Metacritic the film has a weighted average score of 31 out of 100 based on 33 reviews, indicating "generally unfavorable reviews". Audiences polled by CinemaScore gave the film an average grade of "B" on an A+ to F scale.

The film earned a Razzie Award nomination for Worst Prequel, Remake, Rip-off or Sequel. Frank Scheck of The Hollywood Reporter said, "An already silly premise is given a ham-fisted treatment in this ill-advised remake of John Milius' 1984 hit action film". Manohla Dargis of The New York Times said, "Bradley... handles the low-fi action well, which helps divert attention from the bargain-bin special effects, bad acting and politics". Mark Olsen of the Los Angeles Times said, "Reasonably dopey fun on its own, the remade Red Dawn simply can't stand up to the real-world issues it steps on like a land mine". Roger Ebert of the Chicago Sun-Times said, "The story's time frame is confusingly murky. How long does it take the North Koreans to land... and start running things? What is their game plan? Is this a national invasion? We're unclear what's happening in the rest of the United States". Joe Leydon of Variety wrote, "[the] battle scenes are infused with a propulsive sense of urgency, as Bradley (a vet stunt coordinator and second unit director) often achieves an effective semi-documentary look".

== See also ==
- Tomorrow, When the War Began, a film based on a novel about Australia being invaded by an unspecified Asian enemy nation.
- Homefront, a 2011 videogame about a resistance movement in the United States after being occupied by North Korean forces, and its 2016 sequel, Homefront: The Revolution.
