= Craven/Maddalena Films =

Craven/Maddalena Films is a film production company founded in 1996 by Wes Craven and Marianne Maddalena. It was best known for producing horror films, many of which are Craven's films and his remakes.

== Films by release ==
- Scream 2 (1997)
- Don't Look Down (TV movie) (1998)
- Music of the Heart (1999)
- Scream 3 (2000)
- Cursed (2005)
- Red Eye (2005)
- The Hills Have Eyes (2006)
- The Breed (2006)
- The Hills Have Eyes 2 (2007)
- The Waiting (2007)
- Home (2007)
- The Last House on the Left (2009)
