= Cursed (2005 film) =

2005 film by Wes Craven

- Theatrical release poster
- Directed by: Wes Craven
- Written by: Kevin Williamson
- Produced by: Kevin Williamson; Marianne Maddalena
- Starring: Christina Ricci; Joshua Jackson; Jesse Eisenberg; Judy Greer; Scott Baio; Milo Ventimiglia; Shannon Elizabeth; Mýa
- Cinematography: Robert McLachlan
- Edited by: Patrick Lussier
- Music by: Marco Beltrami
- Production companies: Dimension Films; Outerbanks Entertainment; Craven/Maddalena Films
- Distributed by: Miramax Films
- Release date: February 25, 2005
- Running time: 97 minutes
- Country: United States
- Language: English
- Budget: $37-38 million
- Box office: $29.6 million

Cursed is a 2005 American horror comedy film directed by Wes Craven and written by Kevin Williamson, who both collaborated on the Scream film series. The film stars Christina Ricci and Jesse Eisenberg as two orphaned siblings attacked by a werewolf loose in Los Angeles.

Originally planned for 2003, the film took over two more years to be made than originally planned, during which producers Bob and Harvey Weinstein kept asking for reshoots and changes to the plot, re-edited the movie to give a PG-13 rating rather than the original intended R-rating, and fired veteran makeup artist Rick Baker to replace the werewolves he had created with computer-generated ones, even at one point rumored to have hired Disney animator Eric Goldberg to animate an opening sequence for the film. Cursed was released theatrically in the United States on February 25, 2005, by Miramax Films. The film was a box-office bomb and received generally negative reviews from critics; Craven himself was very displeased with the final result.

== Plot ==
On a seaside pier in Los Angeles, friends Jenny Tate and Becky Morton talk to fortune-teller Zela. Zela foretells that they will suffer a horrible fate involving a beast that feeds off the moon. However, they do not believe her. That night, after visiting her boyfriend Jake Taylor, Ellie Myers drives her younger brother, 16-year-old Jimmy Myers, home. Jimmy had a run-in with bullies and his crush Brooke.

En route, Jimmy and Ellie collide with an animal and another car. They attempt to rescue the other driver, Becky, but a creature attacks the trio, killing Becky and slashing the siblings. Despite Jimmy's belief that it was a wolf or dog-type animal, the official police report later credits it to a bear or cougar.

The next day at work, Ellie finds herself attracted to the scent of a coworkers blood, but dismisses it. At a party, Ellie gets annoyed that Jenny is flirting with Jake and leaves. Later, while heading to the parking garage, Jenny is chased and killed by a wolf-like creature. Jimmy starts to believe that the creature was a werewolf, sharing his thoughts with a disbelieving Ellie. To ease Jimmy's concerns, she touches a silver picture frame without getting burned.

Jimmy is becoming stronger and more aggressive. A bully named Bo eventually coerces him to join the wrestling team. Jimmy easily defeats three wrestlers, including Bo, and calls Bo out for constantly making gay jokes towards him, saying that Bo himself is repressing his own homosexuality.

Ellie starts to believe the werewolf hypothesis when she meets Zela. Zela mentions the coming full moon and says that the only way to cure Ellie is to end the line of the werewolf who cursed her. Jimmy later holds a silver cake server and gets burned, discovering that the picture frame Ellie touched earlier was actually stainless steel. Bo then comes by to apologize for all his past behavior as well as to confess that he is gay and has feelings for Jimmy. Jimmy rejects him, believing the attraction to be his werewolf pheromones. The siblings' dog Zipper, who has become afraid of his owners, later bites Jimmy; becoming infected with the curse, and goes on a rampage. Jimmy goes to warn Ellie with Bo.

Ellie deduces that Jake is a werewolf, and he confirms it. However, he did not attack her and Jimmy; he was born a werewolf and can control his transformations. When another werewolf attacks the two, Bo and Jimmy try to help, but Bo is knocked out. The werewolf turns back into Joanie, who was cursed after a one-night stand with Jake. She committed all of the previous murders and now wants to kill all potential rivals so Jake will be hers.

When Jake offers to let Joanie kill him to protect Ellie, she refuses, as doing that would break her curse. After knocking him out, Joanie turns into a werewolf and goes after Ellie and Jimmy. The siblings fight her, and when the police arrive, the two draw Joanie out by insulting her. The police open fire and eventually kill her. Jake disappears in the aftermath.

Jimmy and Ellie return to their wrecked home, where they begin transforming. Jake arrives, revealing that, since he was the originator of Joanie's curse, the only way to cure Jimmy and Ellie is for them to kill him. Jake wants to be with Ellie, but also must kill Jimmy so only he remains the alpha male. Jake and Ellie fight, and Jake ends up having the upper hand. Jimmy, now a semi-transformed werewolf joins in the fight and bites Jake. Ellie eventually manages to bite, stab and badly injure Jake with the silver cake server. Using a shovel, she decapitates Jake and breaks the curse on the two siblings and Zipper. Jake's body bursts into flames.

Bo, Brooke, and Zipper arrive at the house. Jimmy kisses Brooke and walks her home along with Bo; he and Jimmy now friends. Ellie is stuck with the clean-up of their mangled house.

== Cast ==
- Christina Ricci as Ellie Myers
- Joshua Jackson as Jake Taylor
- Jesse Eisenberg as Jimmy Myers
- Judy Greer as Joanie
- Scott Baio as himself
- Milo Ventimiglia as Bo
- Kristina Anapau as Brooke
- Portia de Rossi as Zela
- Shannon Elizabeth as Becky Morton
- Mya as Jenny Tate
- Michael Rosenbaum as Kyle
- Eric Ladin as Louie
- Michelle Krusiec as nosebleed co-worker
- Nick Offerman as police officer
- Derek Mears as Werewolf
- Craig Kilborn as himself
- Lance Bass as himself
- Bowling for Soup as themselves
- Solar as Zipper, Ellie and Jimmy's dog

== Production ==
=== Development ===
The first draft of the script was written by Kevin Williamson in August 2000 and followed the exploits of a New York City serial killer who discovers that his lethal tendencies are due to his lycanthrope nature. Both screenwriters Sean Hood and Tony Gayton did rewrites of Williamson's original script during the development process. Director Wes Craven had previous been attached to direct Bad Moon Rising, a werewolf film for Dimension Films in 1997 about a series of murders in a small West Virginia town, but the film was never made. Dimension Films co-founder Bob Weinstein announced in October 2002 that Cursed would "reinvent the werewolf genre," and that Craven would direct, with the movie being officially released on August 8, 2003. Craven was in the final stages of pre-production with the movie Pulse when Weinstein abruptly pulled the movie from the schedule ten days before shooting and cut through all the slow lanes, getting Cursed off and running. Craven was reportedly not pleased so Weinstein doubled his pay in order for him to do the werewolf film. The director deemed the script too tonally similar to his film Vampire in Brooklyn, but felt pressured by the studio, leading him to ultimately sign on. "Wes and Kevin are a dynamic team, and we are confident that their collaboration will prove to be a winner," Weinstein stated. In December 2002, a press release for the project described Cursed as a "modern, hip twist on the classic werewolf tale" and Dimension Films also announced that Academy Award winning makeup effects designer Rick Baker would be in charge of the overall design of the werewolves. Baker had originally turned down the offer due to the very limited time he had to create all the designs and eventually accepted at the only condition to be able to work without any studio interference.

=== Casting ===
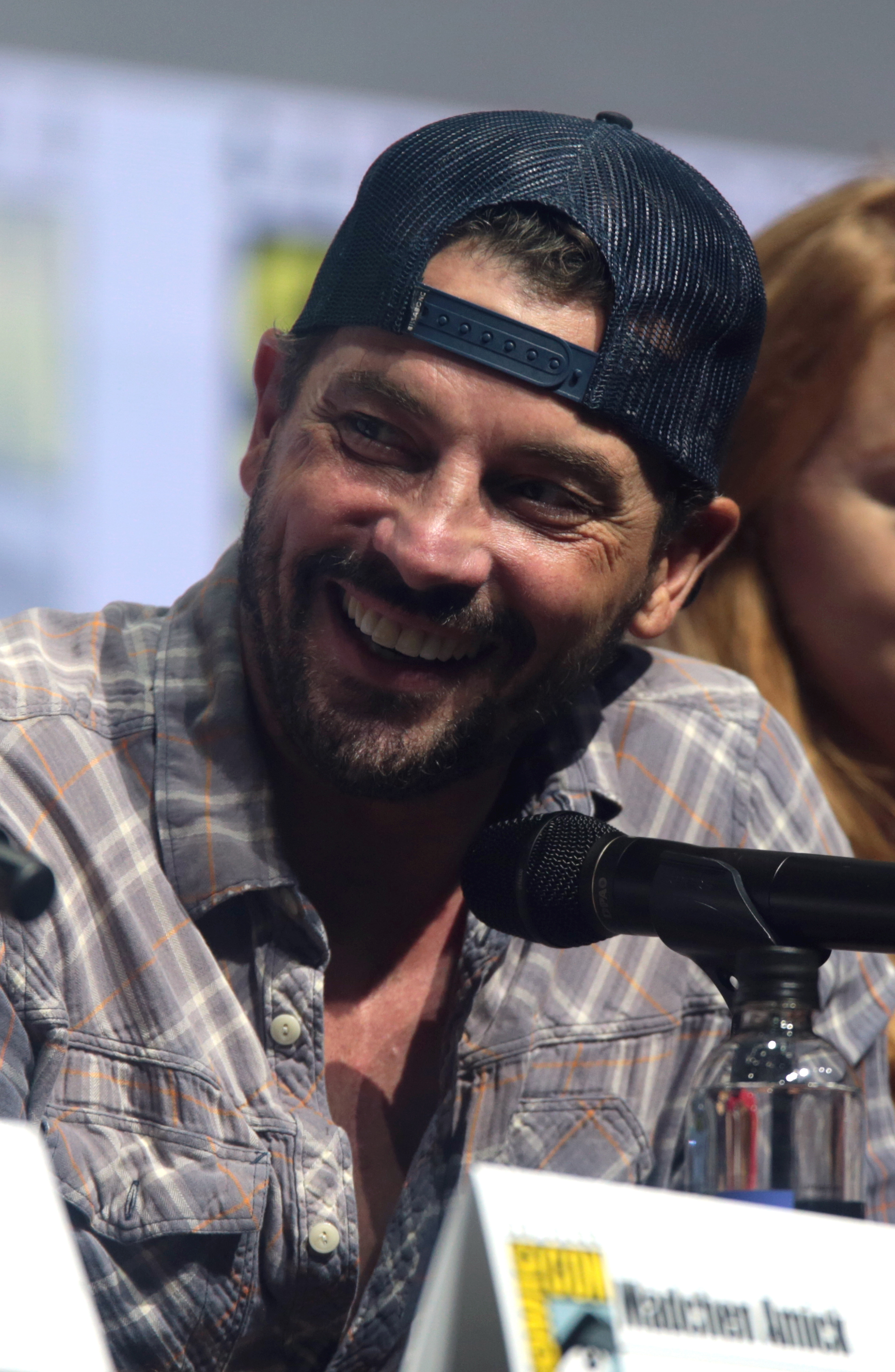
Skeet Ulrich was originally cast as the male lead.

The first of the three leads to be cast was 19-year-old Jesse Eisenberg, star of the critically acclaimed indie Roger Dodger, who was announced on March 3, 2003. It was also reported that Kristina Anapau and Judy Greer had joined the cast in supporting roles.

On March 13, 2003, it was reported that Christina Ricci had signed on to play the leading role of Ellie Harper, an associate producer on The Late Late Show with Craig Kilborn, who is attacked by a werewolf after a car accident on Mulholland Drive. The same day, Scott Foley and Omar Epps were also cast as Ellie's boyfriend Kyle and the chief of the animal control department Ben Taft, respectively.

On March 17, 2003, Skeet Ulrich (who previously starred in Craven's Scream as Billy Loomis) joined the cast as Vince Winston, the burnout son of a millionaire who gets bitten and cursed by the beast. Other cast members included Milo Ventimiglia (Bo, a high school bully), James Brolin (Tyler Winston, Vince's estranged billionaire father), Shannon Elizabeth (Becky Morton, a party girl who gets brutally murdered under the Santa Monica Pier), Illeana Douglas (Zela, an atypical fortune teller) and Robert Forster (Detective Harzel). Scott Baio himself along with Corey Feldman were cast as themselves. Pop singer and actress Mandy Moore was cast as Jenny Taylor, the opening victim who gets killed by the werewolf during a costume party sponsored by PETA. A Nightmare on Elm Street star Heather Langenkamp joined the cast in a small, supporting role as a TV reporter and John C. McGinley took part in the production as Jimmy's abusive dad. James Kallahan and Michelle Krusiec rounded out the main cast as Ellie's co-workers Mark and Debbie.

When production shut down and resumed with a new script, new roles were added and others were re-written. Skeet Ulrich was unsatisfied with his character's transformation and chose to drop out of the film. On December 1, 2003, Joshua Jackson was cast as the new male lead (renamed Jack and retooled as Ellie's boyfriend), along with Portia De Rossi (who replaced Illeana Douglas as Zela), Smallville regular Michael Rosenbaum (taking over James Callahan as Ellie's assistant, now named Kyle) and R&B singer Mýa as Jenny (previously played by Mandy Moore). Lance Bass of *NSYNC joined the cast in a cameo appearance as himself. Scott Foley was originally supposed to reprise the role of Kyle (now turned into Ellie's assistant) but ultimately dropped out as well. James Brolin, Robert Forster, Corey Feldman, Omar Epps, Heather Langenkamp and John C. McGinley were all written out from the new version of the script and could not reprise their roles.

=== Filming ===
Principal photography was supposed to start on January 27, in order to meet the already-locked release date of August 8, 2003, but delays in pre-production forced Dimension Films to push the start date back to mid-March. In late January, a new release date was announced and set on February 4, 2004.

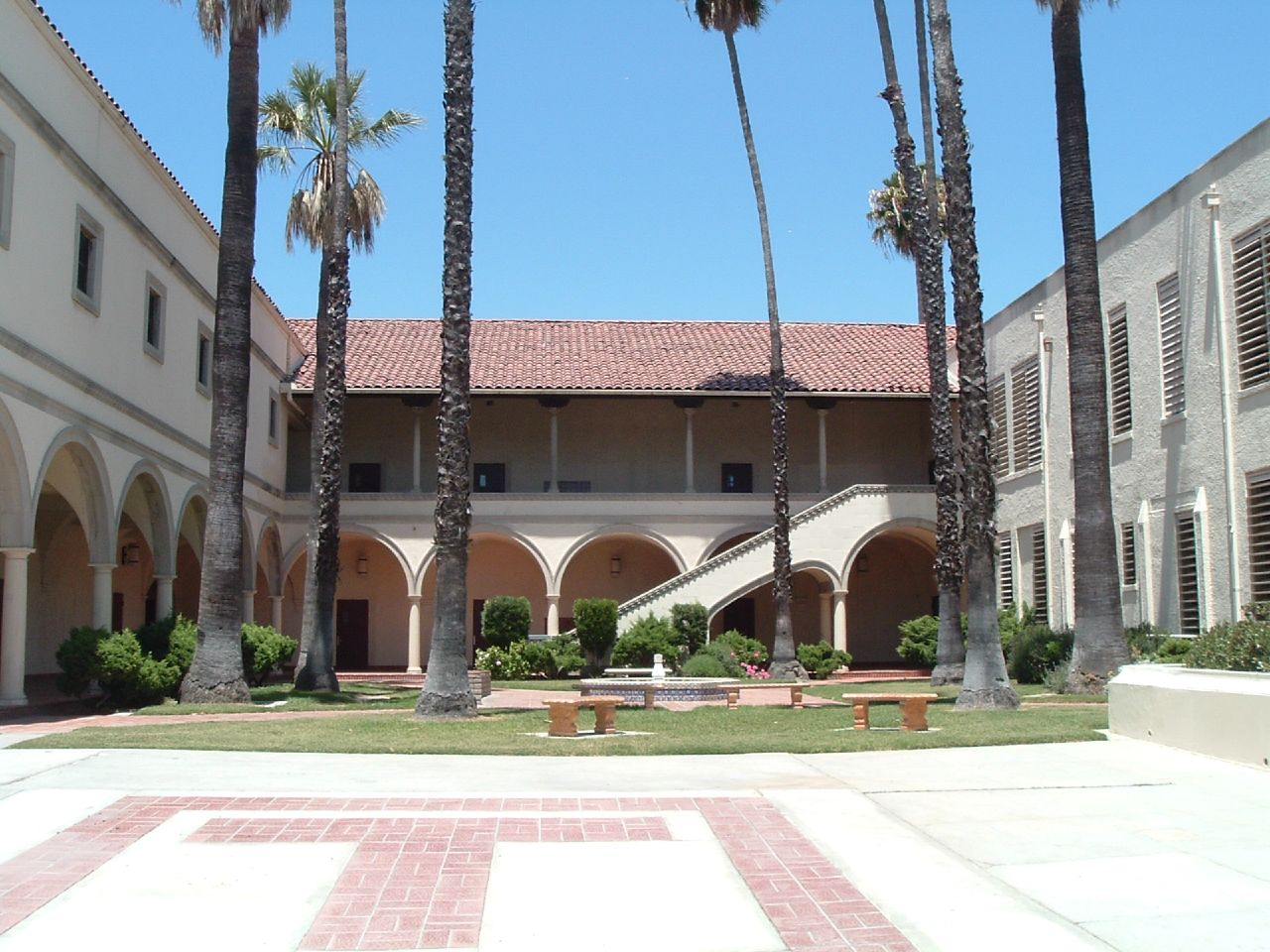
Torrance High School's senior patio

With a budget of $35 million, Cursed commenced shooting in Los Angeles on March 17, 2003, on a scheduled 15-week shoot. The set used for the high school is Torrance High School, the same used for Sunnydale High on Buffy the Vampire Slayer, and West Beverly High on Beverly Hills, 90210 and its spin-off 90210. Filming also occurred at Verdugo Hills High School for the scenes involving Jimmy Myers, Jesse Eisenberg's character. Mandy Moore's opening scene was shot over a two-night period on the roof of The Bel Age Hotel in Hollywood. Singer Sheila E. appeared in this scene as herself, playing with her band at the costume ball for PETA. The car accident was shot on Mulholland Drive and some interiors were built inside the L.A. Center Studios. More scenes were filmed at the Santa Monica Pier and in Hollywood Boulevard.

Entertainment Tonight did interviews with Ulrich and Ricci when original version was being filmed, and their report included behind the scenes footage of some scenes from it, like Ulrich's character Vince walking near the pier at night, another scene in same location showing him jumping down on beach and landing on all fours, scene where he and Ricci's character Ellie are running out of her house and another scene after that one where they jump down to the streets which based on the original script, was the beginning of the scene where werewolf chases after them but they get to Vince's limousine and ultimately manage to escape.

In early June 2003, after 54 days of filming and with only about six days left to shoot the final confrontation at the Hollywood Wax Museum, Dimension Films decided to put the movie on hold because top executives at the company were not happy with the film's ending or how the special effects were progressing, specifically the look of the film's lead lupine.

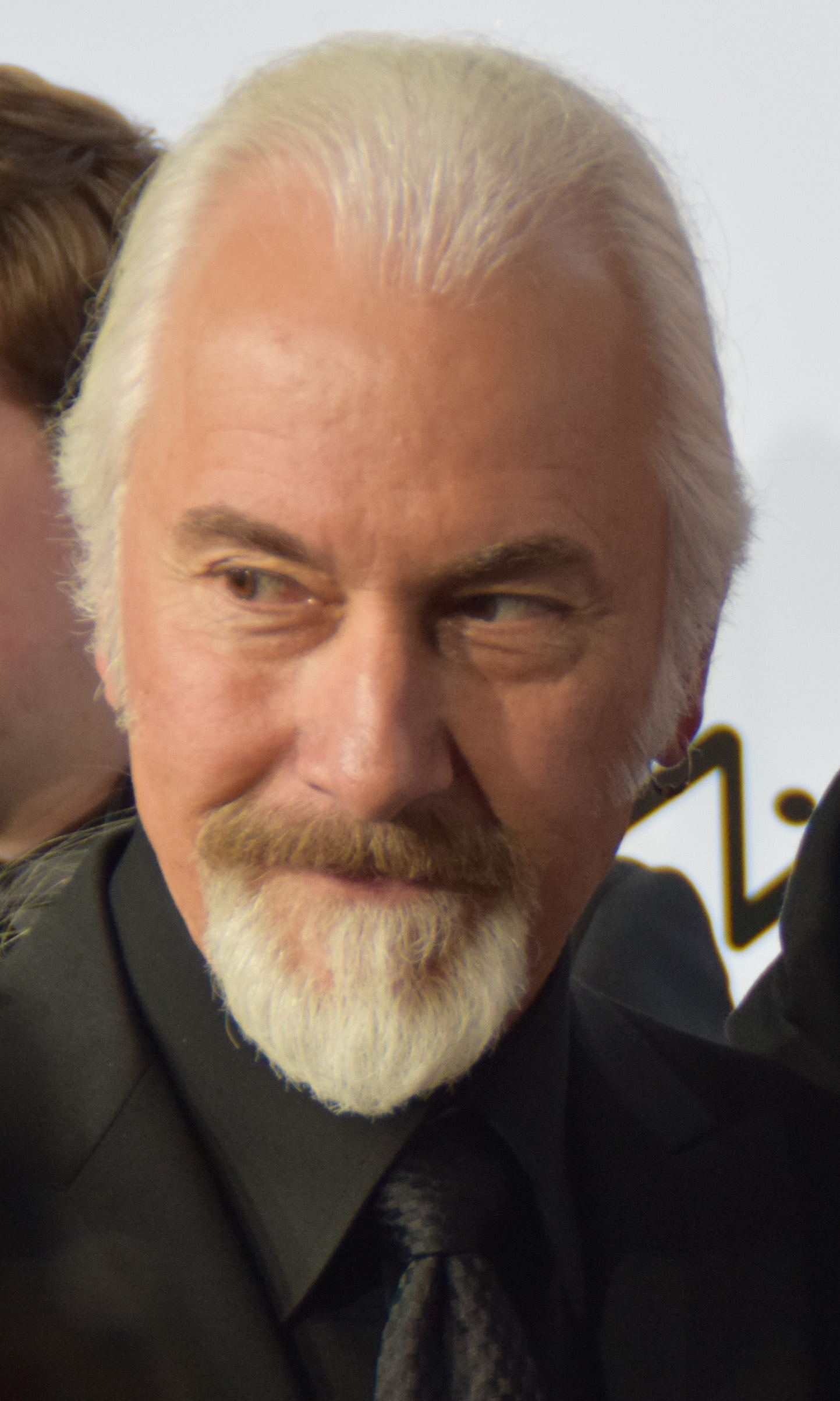
Academy Award winner Rick Baker created the original design of the werewolf.

Rick Baker was preparing the final transformation effects when production stopped and asked Weinstein to let his team finish the work in order for it to be ready for the reshoot.

"We were doing some really cool transformation stuff [but] it wasn't quite done so I said, 'Listen, if you ever think the film's gonna pick up again, if you can keep a number of my people on for another month we can have this transformation stuff, we'll put it in a box and we'll be ready to go. If they disperse now it's gonna be like starting again because I need to have the same people." Weinstein eventually refused.

Editor Patrick Lussier, a frequent collaborator of Craven, had just finished working on re-shoots of Darkness Falls when he was brought in to work on Cursed, which was nearing the end of its principal photography. According to Lussier, the unfinished original version of the film ran about 90 minutes long, and the only thing it was missing, besides the ending, was the score and all the visual effects.

The movie was put back into a development phase during which all parties discussed on the outcome. Several options were considered, including shooting the final confrontation as it was originally written or transform the script into something different, saving as much filmed footage as possible. One alternative was to turn the characters of Jesse Eisenberg and John C. McGinley into werewolf hunters. Ultimately, the original screenplay went under a major rewrite that turned Ellie and Jimmy into estranged siblings and morphed Vince into Ellie's mysterious boyfriend Jake. From those 90 minutes, the new version only included about 12 minutes of the original footage.

After a tentative September restart, the movie officially went back into production on November 17, 2003. "Quite an extraordinary amount of new material is going to be shot, and a lot of material is going to be thrown away," Craven said at the time. Rick Baker, who had created the original werewolf design, left the project because of scheduling conflicts and KNB EFX Group came on board to oversee all the new makeup effects. The exteriors for Jake's new club Tinsel were shot in Vine Street, next to The Capitol Records Tower, Hollywood and Jimmy and Ellie's house was built on the Universal Studios backlot. In the film, Ellie works among the crew of The Late Late Show with Craig Kilborn, with Kilborn making a cameo appearance and Scott Baio, as himself, being booked to appear on the show. Kilborn left the show a few months after shooting wrapped, in August 2004, before the film's release, and was replaced by Craig Ferguson. Originally, during the rewrites, Bob Weinstein wanted the movie to open with an animated opening sequence similar to Scooby-Doo, he wanted to get Disney animator Eric Goldberg to make the sequence, along with a small cameo, But Goldberg declined twice.

On January 17, 2004, the extensive reshoot wrapped. The new ending of the film was much more emotional and tragic, and featured Jackson's character begging his girlfriend Ellie to kill him to end the curse. An article about the film in Fangoria #241 included pictures of a head prop for Jake's original death scene. From all versions of the film which were test screened to audiences (excluding the original version, which was never test screened), this one scored the highest, but Dimension Films was dissatisfied with it and demanded a new one. Actor Jesse Eisenberg, who, along with Christina Ricci, was one of the few actors to work in all the different versions, stated: "The crazy part is that after we filmed the whole second version of the film, we had to go back for a third re-shoot which lasted about 20 days. That's like the length of an independent movie. And then we had to go back a fourth time for like ten days and they made shirts that said Cursed 4: Back for More." The new ending depicted Jake as the main villain, willing to kill both Ellie and Jimmy. According to Patrick Lussier, the final budget for the film was close to $90–100 million. In the final round of reshoots, werewolf actor Derek Mears improvised the infamous shot of the werewolf flipping off Ellie and Jimmy during rehearsal with Craven. Scott Nimerfro was at one point brought in during reshoots to script new scenes, including an opening sequence of the werewolf jumping through the Hollywood sign that was scrapped due to budget limits. In 2014, Judy Greer spoke of the film in an interview: "I don't know why that movie got so fucked up. I don't understand it. I thought the script was fine. Honest to god, I didn't get the big deal. I don't know who kept making them fuck with it. Then we shot the movie for, like, seven years. I think they said we had four movies worth of footage. It was so fun, but so weird. I don't get it. I couldn't figure it out." In 2018, Christina Ricci also spoke briefly about the film in an interview: "It was one of those studio movies that just got horribly screwed up." In 2019, Jesse Eisenberg gave his thoughts about the troubled production and the film: "The first movie was more interesting and provocative. I don't know why it wasn't working. Now that we know the behind-the-scenes of the Weinstein company, it makes sense as to why it was so chaotic." About the troubled production, he said: "They filmed 90% of the bigger budget version… the first movie was this very splashy thing. The second version was definitely cutting corners in a lot of different ways. And the plot? I thought it was so stupid. I thought the plot was so cliché. They made us brother and sister? The things that they kept [from the original film] were little snippets. Like a car rolling down a hill. They kept that shot."

=== Post-production ===
Editor Patrick Lussier was supposed to work on the film for only six weeks in summer 2003, but ended up working on it for 19 months. He also worked as a second unit director during the extensive reshoots.

All Rick Baker's designs were cut and most of KNB practical effects were replaced by CGI, including Judy Greer's transformation. Nevertheless, Rick Baker's name was displayed in the opening credits as the sole special makeup effects designer and creator.

In the fall of 2004, Dimension Films cut the film to a PG-13 rating instead of the planned R rating. Speaking to the New York Post, Craven commented: "The contract called for us to make an R-rated film. We did. It was a very difficult process. Then it was basically taken away from us and cut to PG-13 and ruined. It was two years of very difficult work and almost 100 days of shooting of various versions. Then at the very end, it was chopped up and the studio thought they could make more with a PG-13 movie, and trashed it ... I thought it was completely disrespectful, and it hurt them too, and it was like they shot themselves in the foot with a shotgun." Jenny's death scene in the elevator was originally much gorier, her dead body shown with her belly ripped apart, although not even the R-rated DVD version included this scene. A picture of her mutilated body was, however, shown in a Fangoria article published before the film's release covering the infamously troubled production. Craven and Lussier would move on to Red Eye, and during that film's post-production they would learn that Cursed would be edited down to accommodate a PG-13 rating. A nightmare sequence featuring Jake's throat getting ripped out by Ellie was redone without Craven, instead with Joel Soisson serving as director. In 2008, Craven was quoted as saying: "...the Cursed experience was so screwed up. I mean, that went on for two-and-a-half years of my life for a film that wasn't anything close to what it should have been. […] I did learn from the Cursed experience not to do something for money. They said: 'We know you want to do another film, we'll pay you double.' And we were 10 days from shooting, and I said fine. But I ended up working two-and-a-half years for double my fee, but I could have done two-and-a-half movies, and done movies that were out there making money. In general, I think it's not worth it and part of the reason my phone hasn't rung is that that story is pretty well known."

In July 2021, Brian Collins from Screamfest blog did a review and comparison between the final film and both the Craven's original unfinished cut and first reshot version, which were surfaced from VHS workprints, and both versions were praised as superior to the final film. This is not the first time when news about alternate versions of Cursed existing were reported. Some years ago when he was asked by fans about the film, Patrick Lussier mentioned how he still has copies of three unreleased versions of the film (Craven's unfinished cut, first reshot version, and fully uncut reshot version with all the deleted gore and practical effects by KNB from before most of their work was cut as well), and in October 2018, former Dimension COO Cary Blanat confirmed that all original and deleted footage from Cursed still exists.

== Soundtrack ==
Music from and Inspired by Cursed

Compilation album by various artists
- Released: February 25, 2005
- Genres: Alternative rock; electronica
- Length: 70:44
- Labels: Silva Screen; Treadstone

Professional ratings
Review scores
| Source | Rating |
|---|---|
| Allmusic | 2/5 stars |

CD
| No. | Title | Artist | Length |
|---|---|---|---|
| 1. | "Li'l Red Riding Hood" | Bowling for Soup | 2:30 |
| 2. | "Better Now" | Collective Soul | 3:10 |
| 3. | "Are You Ready" | Three Days Grace | 2:46 |
| 4. | "You'll Never Catch Me" | Steve Harwell | 3:20 |
| 5. | "Stadium Parking Lot" | Apollo 440 | 3:51 |
| 6. | "Fine Without You" (Carmen Rizzo/Jed Smith Indian Summer Remix) | Alkaline Trio | 4:52 |
| 7. | "Spirits" (featuring Saffron) | Junkie XL | 4:40 |
| 8. | "This Is a Forgery" | Dashboard Confessional | 3:37 |
| 9. | "Still Need Your Love" | Reno | 3:26 |
| 10. | "If You Don't Jump (You Are English)" | GusGus | 4:59 |
| 11. | "Bound Too Long" (Hyper Remix) | The Crystal Method | 4:59 |
| 12. | "Freaks Come Out at Night" (Carmen Rizzo "Nocturnal" Remix) | Whodini | 4:29 |
| 13. | "Sick" | Seven Wiser | 3:06 |
| 14. | "Let Me Out" | MBD | 3:42 |
| 15. | "On the Edge of the World" | Balligomingo | 3:23 |
| 16. | "Cursed Suite" | Marco Beltrami | 5:35 |
| 17. | "After All" (featuring Jaël) | Delerium | 4:51 |
| 18. | "Silent Engagement" | Q South | 3:28 |
| Total length: | | | 70:44 |

== Release ==
=== Theatrical ===
The original target release date was August 8, 2003, but delays in getting the production ready in time pushed the target date back six months to February 13, 2004. When the movie was sent back to development and three different reshoots were scheduled, the release date was pushed back again. In December 2004, Fangoria reported that the movie was scheduled to open nationwide February 25, 2005, with a PG-13 rating.

Christina Ricci's face served as the backdrop in the movie's key art, that evoked Drew Barrymore's close-up in Scream's iconic official poster. The tagline for the movie was "What doesn't kill you makes you stronger". The first official trailer premiered on January 7, 2005.

=== Home media ===
When released on DVD in the United States on June 21, 2005, two versions were available: the original theatrical version (rated PG-13; 97 minutes), and also an unrated version which contains the footage cut to obtain a PG-13 rating and runs approximately two minutes longer than the original release. In Canada, Alliance Atlantis released the unrated (marketed as "Uncensored") version only on DVD (as opposed to Dimension Home Video in the United States) and the DVD cover was changed to match the original theatrical poster.

In 2005, Dimension was sold from Disney to their original owners Harvey and Bob Weinstein when they left the company to form The Weinstein Company, with Disney then selling off the parent label Miramax in 2010. Miramax and the rights to the pre-October 2005 library of Dimension were subsequently taken over by private equity firm Filmyard Holdings that same year. Filmyard sublicensed the home video rights for several Dimension/Miramax titles to Echo Bridge Entertainment. The film received its Blu-ray release on September 11, 2012, through Echo Bridge Entertainment, in a double feature with another Wes Craven "presented" film, They (2002). The disc only contains the theatrical cut.

Filmyard Holdings sold Miramax to Qatari company beIN Media Group in March 2016. In April 2020, ViacomCBS (now known as Paramount Skydance) acquired the rights to Miramax's library and Dimension's pre-October 2005 library, after buying a 49% stake in Miramax from beIN. The film has been distributed by Paramount Pictures since April 2020. Paramount later included it in a collection titled "Paramount Scares", which included other horror films they owned, in addition to including it on their subscription streaming service Paramount+ and on their free streaming service Pluto TV.

The film was released individually for the first time in the United States on Blu-ray by Shout Factory, under license from Paramount. This release occurred in April 2022 and featured both the theatrical and extended cut.

== Reception ==
=== Box office ===
Cursed opened in 2,805 theatres on February 25, 2005, taking $9,633,085 in its opening weekend and averaging a mild $3,434 per site. It placed fourth on the box office rankings, following Diary of a Mad Black Woman (opening that weekend as well), Hitch and Constantine. The following weekend, the movie declined 60%, grossing $3,867,052 and finishing seventh in the box office charts, with a 10-day sum of $15.3M. Box Office Guru dubbed the film's performance as "disappointing”. On its third week, the film placed tenth, falling 60% to $1,564,363 for a $17.7 total, marking its last week in the national top ten. Box Office Guru predicted a final gross of about $21 million.

Cursed ended its theatrical run after 11 weeks on May 12, 2005, with a cumulative domestic gross of $19,297,522. An additional $10,324,200 internationally brought the worldwide total to $29,621,722.

=== Critical response ===
On Rotten Tomatoes, the film holds an approval rating of 16% based on 96 reviews, with an average rating of 3.70/10. The site's critics consensus reads: "A predictable plot and cheesy special effects make Cursed a less-than-scary experience." Metacritic reports a weighted average score of 31 out of 100 based on 21 critics, indicating "generally unfavorable" reviews. Audiences polled by CinemaScore gave the film an average grade of "C−" on an A+ to F scale.

The San Francisco Chronicle wrote: "Cursed is a third-rate effort, with a weak script, cheap-looking effects and no genuine frights." Film Threat stated: "Not that it doesn't make movie history. Until this past Friday, the worst werewolf film ever made was, hairy hands down, Mike Nichols' Wolf. Cursed now assumes that dubious distinction and someone is going to have to try very hard to wrestle it away."

Rafe Telsch of CinemaBlend, giving the film two out of five stars, felt that "Cursed isn't a bad film, and actually takes a unique approach to modern day genre movies by styling itself as an older one... The film is a fun little romp in the werewolf world, although Cursed never really sets any rules for the creatures themselves, leaving itself open to keep cute faces like Ricci's uncovered by makeup, but leaving the audience unsatisfied that there aren't really many werewolves in this werewolf movie."

== Potential director's cut ==
Since the film's release, there had been calls from fans for a release of Wes Craven's original cut. On October 30, 2018, former Dimension COO Cary Blanat revealed in an interview with Bloody Disgusting that the original footage still exists. Writing for the site, Meagan Navarro added the film to her list of potential director's cut yet to be released, calling for those responsible to "release the Craven Cut".

Editor Patrick Lussier commented on the movement in July 2021, stating that a release of the original cut of the film was very unlikely due to the ending never being shot, and also due to a lack of popularity, as opposed to a film like Zack Snyder's Justice League. Lussier claimed he had no idea who owned the rights to the film due to various Miramax properties reverting to other companies, leaving any future of an alternate cut in doubt.

In 2022, images from the Craven cut were posted on the website Hello Sidney.
