= The Breed (2006 film) =

- Theatrical release poster
- Directed by: Nicholas Mastandrea
- Written by: Robert Conte; Peter Martin Wortmann
- Produced by: David Lancaster; Marianne Maddalena; David Wicht
- Starring: Michelle Rodriguez; Oliver Hudson; Taryn Manning; Eric Lively; Hill Harper
- Cinematography: Giulio Biccari
- Edited by: Nathan Easterling
- Music by: Marcus Trumpp
- Production companies: Craven/Maddalena Films; David Lancaster Productions; Nelvana Limited; ApolloProMovie & Co. 1. Filmproduktion
- Distributed by: IFC Midnight
- Release dates: 8 November 2006 (Germany); 8 August 2007 (United States); 12 October 2008 (Peru)
- Running time: 87 minutes
- Countries: Germany; South America; United States
- Language: English

The Breed is a 2006 horror drama film that is directed by Nicholas Mastandrea and executive produced by Wes Craven. Having marked Mastandrea's directorial debut, the film features two brothers and their friends who travel to an island cabin the brothers inherited from their recently deceased uncle for a relaxing weekend getaway. However, the group is besieged by ravenous genetically enhanced dogs bred to kill at an abandoned training facility on the island. Critic reviews were generally negative.

== Plot ==
A couple out sailing arrive at a small island, where the woman wanders off and stumbles across a fenced-off, seemingly abandoned compound and is attacked by unknown creatures.

Later, brothers Matt and John travel by seaplane to the island for a week of fun and relaxation. The uninhabited island was owned by their late uncle, who built a cabin on it, and they are joined by three friends: Nicki, Sara and Noah. The friends find a puppy, who mysteriously growls at Noah and runs outside the cabin. John and Sara pursue him and are ambushed by an older, vicious dog who bites Sara.

The next day, the men are in the forest and encounter the man who came to the island at the beginning of the movie, who is now covered in blood. After he warns them about the dogs, a pack attacks and kills him. The group retreat to the cabin, and while Nicki is being attacked, John shoots an arrow at the dog but accidentally shoots through Nicki's calf. They are soon under siege by more dogs, one of which they impale with a fire iron.

The friends decide they must leave the island, but dogs have surrounded the seaplane. Lacking options and means of communication, they wait, but the dogs chew through the plane's mooring ropes, setting it adrift. John attempts to swim to the plane, which is covered in dogs who pursue him, but he reaches the dock. The group retreats to the house, where Sara begins to display canine behavior.

They decide to head to a storage shed and drive their uncle's Mercedes-Benz to the training compound to call for help. However, the car won't start, so they party through the night. After a power outage, Noah heads to the basement fuse box and is killed by dogs who have entered the house. Matt is bitten next, but he, John, Nicki and Sara hide in the attic, where they discover paperwork from the training compound and learn it was an Army facility to train attack dogs.

The next day, the dogs have left. Matt and John manage to pop the clutch of their uncle's Mercedes, but Sara doesn't want to leave. The dogs attack her again and she falls out a window and impales both herself and the dog on a post.

Matt, John, and Nicki drive to the abandoned facility and discover that the dogs were being genetically enhanced. John finds communications equipment, but a power cable on the antenna has been disconnected. Having been bitten and infected, Matt learns he can sense the dogs and realizes that if they escaped they can get back in. John fixes the antenna but is accidentally shocked by electricity, knocking him to the ground, where the dogs attack him. Matt shows up with a baseball bat to fight off the dogs, but a power surge causes a fire in the compound, creating a backdraft. Nicki lures in the dogs and the building explodes, killing all the dogs inside.

John tells Matt that he saw a nearby boat, owned by the couple from beginning of the film. The dogs surround the brothers but appear docile, and Nicki arrives in the Mercedes, picking up the brothers and speeding off. Swarmed by dogs, they can't stop the car, so John has Nicki drive the car off the pier, after which they swim to the boat and sail off. They decide to head to medical facilities before Matt and John can fall victim to the dog bites and become feral-minded like the dogs. In the last shot, the friends open the door to the sleeping quarters and a stowaway dog leaps out.

== Cast ==
- Michelle Rodriguez as Nicki
- Oliver Hudson as John
- Taryn Manning as Sara
- Eric Lively as Matt
- Hill Harper as Noah
- Nick Boraine as Luke
- Lisa-Marie Schneider as Jenny

== Production ==
This film is Nick Mastandrea's debut as a director. Mastandrea had been recruited by Wes Craven to direct the movie after Mastandrea served as Craven's first assistant director for the film Wes Craven's New Nightmare (1994). Each actor had almost a week of dog training before filming began. Production started in April 2005 and finished about two months later.

== Reception ==
The Breed earned an approval rating of 27% indicating general dislike from critics on Rotten Tomatoes. With reviews that read; "The Breed' is an unfortunate, boring movie, with dialogues that seem out of the mind of a schoolboy." by Juan Luis Caviaro of Espinof, "A bargain basement effort that(TM)s about as scary as a rabbit with an ingrown toenail." by Jamie Russell of Total Film, "Characters so obnoxious you literally will them to die." by Jamie Russell of Film4, "Despite the presence of Wes Craven as a producer, this is really a pretty unscary effort." by Andrew Pulver of Guardian and "The Breed is not going to break any new horror or killer dog subgenre standards. As it stands, it is an acceptable time killer that won't challenge or offend." by Johnny Butane of Dread Central.

== Sequel ==
A sequel to the film, A Breed Apart, written and directed by Griff and Nathan Furst, was released on May 16, 2025. The film is a "meta sequel" where a band of influencers are invited to the island where the original film was made in a race to "rescue" the dogs only to learn the rabid dogs are real and consider the island their hunting grounds. The film stars Grace Caroline Currey and Virginia Gardner, the stars of Fall, along with Hayden Panettiere.
