= The Last House on the Left (2009 film) =

2009 horror film by Dennis Iliadis

- Theatrical release poster
- Directed by: Dennis Iliadis
- Screenplay by: Adam Alleca; Carl Ellsworth
- Based on: The Last House on the Left by Wes Craven
- Produced by: Wes Craven; Sean S. Cunningham; Marianne Maddalena
- Starring: Tony Goldwyn; Monica Potter; Garret Dillahunt; Aaron Paul; Spencer Treat Clark; Riki Lindhome; Martha MacIsaac; Sara Paxton
- Cinematography: Sharone Meir
- Edited by: Peter McNulty
- Music by: John Murphy
- Production companies: Rogue Pictures; Craven/Maddalena Films; Crystal Lake Entertainment; Sean S. Cunningham Films; Scion Films; Midnight Entertainment
- Distributed by: Universal Pictures
- Release date: March 13, 2009 (United States)
- Running time: 113 minutes
- Countries: United States; South Africa
- Language: English
- Budget: $15 million
- Box office: $46 million

The Last House on the Left is a 2009 rape and revenge film directed by Dennis Iliadis and written by Adam Alleca and Carl Ellsworth. A remake of the 1972 film of the same name, the film stars Tony Goldwyn, Monica Potter, Garret Dillahunt, Aaron Paul, Spencer Treat Clark, Riki Lindhome, Martha MacIsaac, and Sara Paxton. The film follows Mari Collingwood (Paxton) and her best friend Paige (MacIsaac), two teenagers who are abducted by a family of violent fugitives. After Paige is murdered and Mari is raped and left for dead, her parents, John (Goldwyn) and Emma (Potter), seek vengeance against the family, who have taken shelter at their summer home during a thunderstorm.

The original script by Alleca included elements of supernatural horror, which prompted the studio to reject it and bring in Ellsworth for rewrites. Craven, who wrote and directed the original film, was interested to see what kind of film could be made on a larger budget, as the limited funds forced him to remove scenes he had wanted to film to tell a complete story. One of the elements Iliadis wanted to avoid with the film, given its graphic nature, was turning it into "torture porn". For Craven and Iliadis, the film illustrates how even the most normal of families can be driven to commit evil acts if pushed too far. Although the film is set in an undisclosed town in the United States, principal photography began in Cape Town and Helderberg Nature Reserve in March 2008 and concluded in May.

The Last House on the Left was theatrically released in the United States on March 13, 2009, and was a box office success, grossing $46 million against its $15 million production budget. Despite this, film received mixed reviews from critics, with several deeming it worthy of praise in comparison to other horror films and remakes in general, while others considered it inferior to the original.

== Plot ==
Krug Stillo, a notorious killer, is being transported to a max security prison. When he asks the transporting officers for a restroom break, the two refuse knowing he is a flight risk. While stopped at a railroad crossing, the two officers are viciously broadsided by a pickup truck driven by Krug's brother Francis, and the former's girlfriend Sadie. Sadie shoots one officer dead, and Krug wraps a seatbelt around the other officers neck which ultimately kills him. Both officers die at the scene, leaving the killers at large.

Dr. John Collingwood, his wife, Emma, and their teenage daughter, competitive swimmer Mari, head out on vacation to their lake house. Shortly thereafter, Mari borrows the family car and drives into town to spend time with her friend Paige. While Paige works the cash register at a local store, she and Mari meet Justin, a teenager passing through town, who invites them both back to his roadside motel room to smoke marijuana. While the three are hanging out in the motel room, Justin's family members return: his father Krug, his uncle Francis, and Krug's girlfriend Sadie, his stepmother.

Krug becomes angry at Justin for bringing unknown people to their motel room and shows him a local newspaper that has Krug and Sadie's pictures on the front page, which explains how Sadie and Francis broke Krug out of police custody and killed the two officers who were transporting him. Believing it would be too risky to let Paige and Mari go, the gang kidnaps them and uses their car to leave town. While Krug searches for the highway, Mari convinces him to take a road that leads to her parents' lake house; Mari then attempts to jump out of the vehicle, but the ensuing fight among the passengers causes Krug to crash into a tree totaling the vehicle.

Frustrated by Mari's attempt to escape, Sadie and Francis proceed to beat Mari and Paige as they crawl from the wreckage. Once Sadie begins to attack Mari, Paige hits Sadie in the stomach, knocking her off Mari and giving the girls a chance to escape their assailants. However, before Mari can run away, Krug grabs her and urges Sadie and Francis to get Paige. Paige runs through the woods, falls, and injures her leg. Upon doing so, she sees a lumber mill site ahead and calls for help but is not heard over the loud noise of the machines. She is then captured by Sadie and Francis and taken back into the woods. When they arrive back in the woods where the rest of the group is, a now-tied-up Paige is placed on the ground. Krug then attempts to teach Justin to "be a man" by forcing him to touch Mari's breasts. Paige begins insulting him to get him to stop; in response, Krug and Francis fatally stab Paige repeatedly, and Mari watches her friend bleed to death. Krug, frustrated at Mari’s rebelliousness, proceeds to pin her face down to the ground and rape her. During the rape, Krug pulls off Mari's necklace and throws it away. When he is finished raping her, Mari musters enough strength to escape the group and make it to the lake so she can swim to safety. Krug shoots her in the back as she swims, leaving her body floating in the lake.

A storm forces Krug, Francis, Sadie, and Justin to seek refuge at a nearby house, owned by John and Emma. Justin soon discovers a photo of Mari and learns that John and Emma are her parents. John invites them to stay the night in their guest house, and Justin intentionally leaves Mari's necklace on the kitchen counter to alert them about their daughter. Meanwhile, Mari, critically wounded, manages to swim ashore and makes her way to her parents’ home, collapsing on the front porch. John and Emma discover Mari outside and the necklace on the counter. John examines her and discovers signs of rape and he and Emma realize that Mari's assailants are the people in their guest house.

As they try to find the key to their boat, so they can take Mari to the hospital, Francis enters the main house and discovers Mari alive. Emma and John attack Francis, killing him with a hammer. John and Emma enter the guest house while Krug and Sadie are sleeping. They find Justin holding Krug's gun, which he hands to John. Sadie awakens, and John shoots and wounds her in the neck, allowing Krug to escape through the window and into their house. Finding Francis dead, Krug realizes that they are Mari's parents. Sadie attacks John, then runs into the bathroom. John and Justin break in, and Sadie beats them with a shower curtain rod, almost knocking them out until Emma shoots and kills Sadie through her right eye. Krug hides and attacks John and Justin when they search for him. Krug has the upper hand on John, until Justin pulls a gun on Krug and pulls the trigger, only to be empty. Justin is stabbed by a enraged Krug, but with a combined effort from Emma and John, Krug is knocked unconscious. John, Emma, Mari, and Justin then leave in the boat for the hospital.

Later, John returns to the cabin, where he has paralyzed Krug from the neck down. John places Krug's head in a microwave jerry-rigged to operate even with the door open. As John walks away, Krug's head explodes from the scorching heat.

== Cast ==
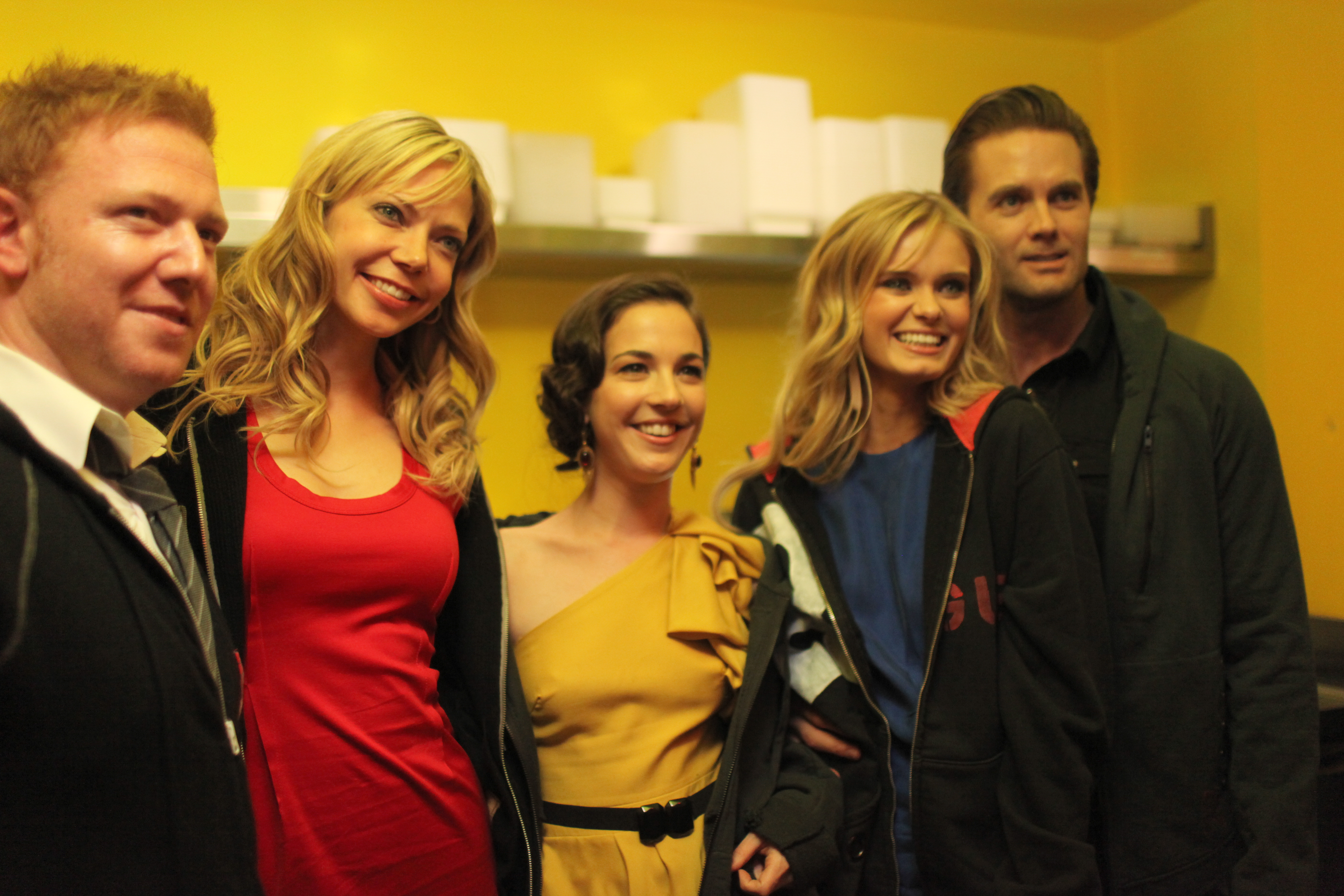
Cast of Last House on the Left at the premiere in Los Angeles, 2009

- Tony Goldwyn as Dr. John Collingwood
- Monica Potter as Emma Collingwood
- Garret Dillahunt as Krug Stillo
- Aaron Paul as Francis Stillo
- Spencer Treat Clark as Justin Stillo
- Riki Lindhome as Sadie
- Martha MacIsaac as Paige
- Michael Bowen as Officer Morton
- Sara Paxton as Mari Collingwood
- Josh Coxx as Officer Giles
- Usha Khan as Maid

== Production ==
=== Development ===
In August 2006, Rogue Pictures finalized a deal to remake The Last House on the Left (1972) with original writer and director Wes Craven as a producer, while the company intended to preserve the storyline of the original film. In September 2006, it was announced that Craven had formed a production company, Midnight Pictures, under the umbrella of Rogue Pictures, and the remake for The Last House on the Left was selected as the company's first project.

One of the reasons Craven agreed to remake The Last House on the Left was because of the money involved. During production on the 1972 original, he did not have a large enough budget to shoot every piece of the story he wanted to tell, forcing him to remove several scenes from the original script. With the 2009 remake, a larger budget allowed the filmmakers to pace themselves more during filming and expand the scope of the story. One of the ways to accomplish this was for the producers to find a "rising young director to bring a new perspective for the story". According to the producers, who were impressed with his work on Hardcore (2004), director Dennis Iliadis was the person they were looking for. Co-producer Cody Zwieg stated, "Hardcore wasn't a genre or a horror film but showed completely believable characters in horrific, realistic situations. Many directors could handle the surface elements, the blood and shock moments of Last House, but Dennis proved that he could do it all without exploiting his characters and their situations." According to Iliadis, he "jumped at the chance" to remake The Last House on the Left, having already been a fan of Craven's and seen all of his films.

=== Writing ===
"What would a typical family do in such an extreme scenario? [...] We're asking ourselves through it: 'How are they going to do this? How would we do it?' Then that poses the opportunity to really explore the extreme nature. In terms of Krug - these are evil human beings. Humans are capable of evil shit all the time, so it was a chance for me to get into the R-rated version of [these themes]."
— Ellsworth on the film's primary themes.

An early draft written by Adam Alleca had moved the setting to California, and altered the third act to include elements of the supernatural. When that script was rejected, Carl Ellsworth was brought in to touch up the script by Alleca. Ellsworth had previously worked with Craven on Red Eye (2005), but had never seen the original film. After reading the script and watching the 1972 film, the latter he found difficult to watch due to its extreme nature, Ellsworth decided that the first thing that needed to be done was to establish someone whose survival the audience would want to root for. Ellsworth wanted to know how the "typical family" would react to such a heinous act being perpetrated on their daughter, and what they were truly capable of. According to Craven, most of the early script problems were based around deciding what elements to include, such as uncertainty with how much of the fugitive family needed to be seen or if Mari should live or die.

One of the changes that Ellsworth made was keeping Mari alive, as the character is found dead in the original film. Ellsworth believes keeping Mari alive when her parents find her adds to the suspense, because there is now a "ticking clock" for the parents to get their daughter to hospital. Another change to the character was making her a swimmer. Iliadis wanted to give Mari a "big character trait" that could be used as a coping mechanism for the character, as well as become an important component to her escaping Krug and his family. As Iliadis explains, "Well the idea was to find something where she channels all her energy and that was a big character trait because her brother is dead. It's like she's carrying him on her back. She needs to perform for two people now. She has to compensate for him so all her energy is in the water. The only area where she feels slightly free is when she's in the water swimming like crazy, so it's interesting having that as a character trait, and then having that as a key element for her trying to escape."

Ellsworth changed the fate of another character, Krug's son Justin, attempting to give the audience a better "sense of hope". Craven points out that early on he suggested that Krug have a son who commits suicide, but found it more interesting to see "this strange Romeo and Juliet thing happening" between Justin and Mari. He also stated that he likes the fact that John Collingwood is a doctor who actually gets to use his skills in the film, unlike in the original where the character is merely identified as being a doctor. Craven comments, "[it is] an extraordinary moment" when John is forced to improvise a way to restore a collapsed lung; "It made it real." Ellsworth wanted to create a level of interest in the characters that would "engage [the audience]", as opposed to simply leaving the family in "even worse shape [by] the end of the movie". He asserts that the film does not have a happy ending, but that there is some hope left at the end. Initially, Iliadis feared that they were "wussing out" with the ending, but eventually decided that what the audience would see is a family that has physically survived this encounter, but are "dead in many ways". Iliadis expressed that he did not want to go the way of "torture porn", which is what he sees most horror films moving toward, but instead show a sense of "urgency" with the parents' actions.

=== Casting ===
When casting for the film, Iliadis wanted to find actors who would not portray these characters in a stereotypical way. As Craven explains, they wanted someone who would take these characters in a direction that most actors would not—they wanted originality. Craven states, "You need an actor who can bring a complete sense of commitment to that character without making it silly and not be afraid to go in there to the point where someone might say, 'Oh, you got bad in you?' You have to be brave enough and mature enough to know we've all got it, and you're not afraid of putting it out there and if you've got a problem with seeing that, tough." For instance, Iliadis wanted to avoid casting a superficially sexy actress in the role of Mari, because he did not want the rape sequence to appear enjoyable to the viewers in any possible way. Iliadis notes that when Sara Paxton came in her audition was "good", but it was this sense of intelligence and intensity that Paxton brought with her. The actress also had the "innocent face" Iliadis was looking for, someone who had this "wholesomely American look" that would not allow anyone to enjoy watching her go through these horrific events.

"We were casting for Krug and everyone was coming and doing the squinty eyes and (he growls) and Garret brought this intensity, this evil which is not premeditated, and when that evil emerges it's even stronger because it comes from a real human being who's very angry. It doesn't come from someone who has just decided to be bad."
— Iliadis on casting Garret Dillahunt as Krug.

Iliadis auditioned dozens of actors before hiring Garret Dillahunt for the role of Krug, the leader of the family that kidnaps Mari and Paige. According to Iliadis, the actors coming in kept trying to portray Krug as the "typical bad guy", which was not what he wanted. In Iliadis's opinion, "the most sadistic criminal will smile"; when Dillahunt came in he brought a slyness to the character, and created "ambiguity and subtleties" to the character that Iliadis liked. Dillahunt attempted to humanize Krug by approaching the character more as a man who feels some love for his son, but is bitter about how his life has turned out and is fearful that he is losing his position as the leader. He further clarifies that Krug fails to take responsibility for his own actions, instead blaming others, and prefers to deliver his own "twisted justice" to those he feels have wronged him.

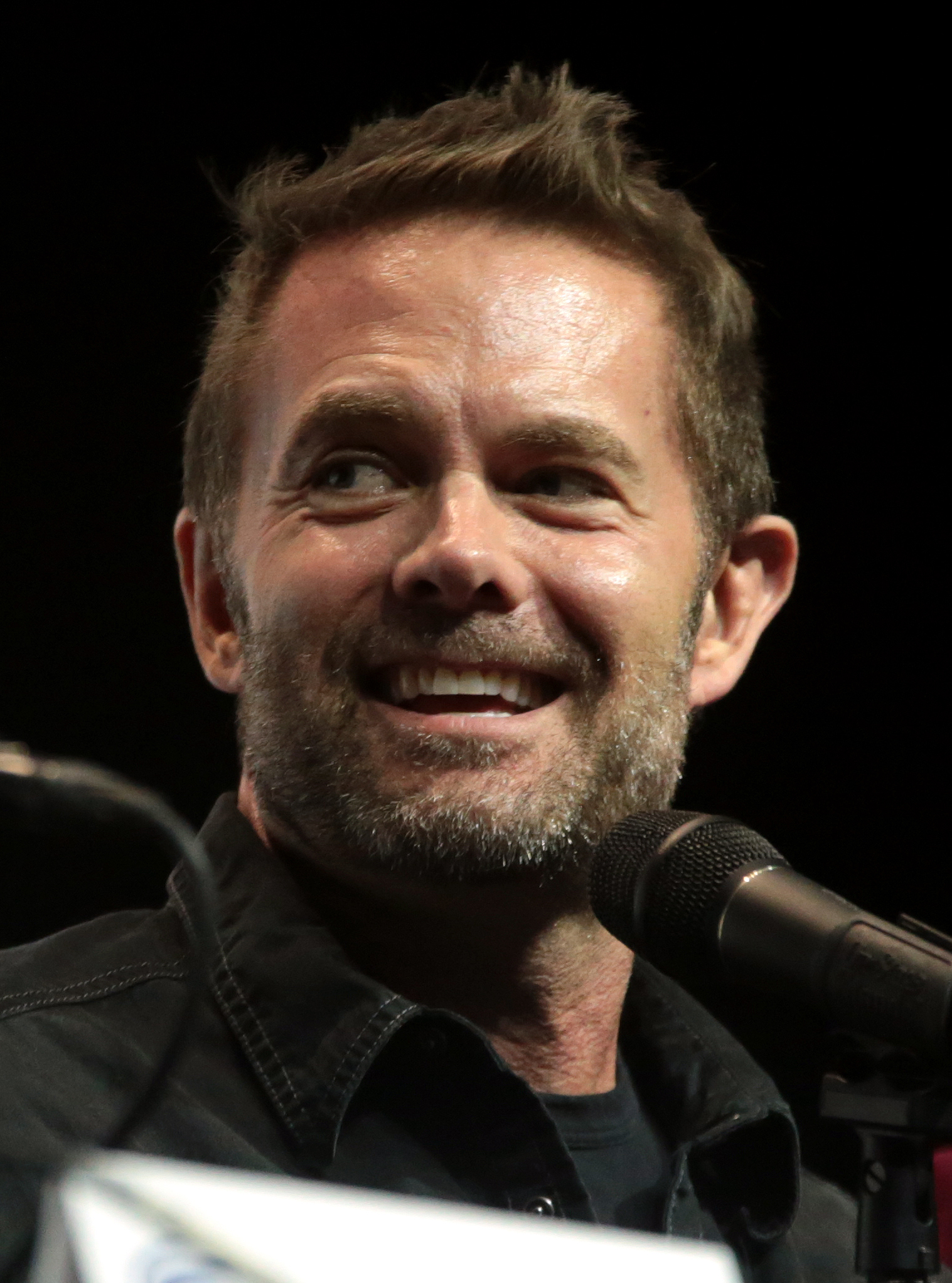
It was Garret Dillahunt's unique auditioning approach—creating "ambiguity and subtleties" that the other actors were lacking—that ultimately won him the role of Krug.

Dillahunt took inspiration from Andrew Cunanan, the man who killed Gianni Versace, when he recalled the brutality in which Cunanan murdered a man just for his car. Dillahunt recalls how an FBI profiler noted that this type of rage is typically directed toward someone the perpetrator knows, yet Cunanan managed to pull some element from his own life and place it on this random person who attempted to stand his ground against the would-be carjacker. To Dillahunt, that was how he wanted to approach Krug. To him, Mari actually shows that she is not afraid of Krug, which causes him to go "crazy". That being said, Dillahunt felt the scene where Krug rapes Mari was one of the hardest things emotionally to film. He notes that part of him was happy that Paxton was cast as Mari, because they had worked together in the past, so they knew each other. On the other hand, he felt uncomfortable acting out such a scene with a person he considered to be a friend. Paxton echoed his sentiments to Craven, who stated the actress expressed to him a greater feeling of trust that the person who would have to do these "horrible" things to her was someone she knew, and as a result made them at least partially more bearable to act.

At the time Riki Lindhome was called in to audition for the role of Sadie in December 2007, she had not heard of Craven's original film. On the day of her audition, Lindhome was informed that she had missed her scheduled appointment and that she would need to return come January. Lindhome took the time to watch the original film and read an article in Vanity Fair about it, giving her some familiarity with the story and her role when she went to audition. Lindhome said she found her character "creepy for no apparent reason", because the film does not attempt to justify why the antagonists do what they do. Lindhome characterized Sadie as being "equally as bad as [the men]", and admitted that early in production it was easier for her to detach herself from the violent character she was portraying, but as filming continued and the cast grew closer it became more difficult and "upsetting" to perform some of the scenes. According to Lindhome, in response to seeing how some of the scenes were affecting the women, the producers sent Lindhome, Paxton, and Martha MacIsaac, who was cast as Paige, to a spa for a weekend.

Before filming began, some of the actors had to undergo training in preparation for their roles. Dillahunt, Lindhome, and Aaron Paul, who was cast as Krug's brother Francis, had to take part in firearms lessons, while Paxton had to get up each morning for swimming lessons in order to look like an experienced swimmer. Iliadis spent several weeks with the actors in rehearsal, and it was his hope that the space to rehearse their roles and the time during filming to develop their characters individually, would help them to trust him as a director more.

=== Filming ===
Craven gave Iliadis the freedom to do what he wanted while filming the remake, partially because Craven was in the process of working on a new film for himself, My Soul to Take (2010), but also because he likes to allow directors the chance to make their own film. For the 2009 remake, Iliadis wanted to keep a consistency among the scenes of his film, as compared to the 1972 original. Iliadis stated that he felt the intercutting of comedic scenes with the rape scene in the 1972 film had a tendency to take one out of the moment. Iliadis wanted to "cut those diversions out", as a way of "[throwing the audience] into this scene with no place to cut away to". For Iliadis, taking this approach helped to create more drama for the event. The producers brought in a medical technician to provide insight, based on his job experience witnessing people's deaths, and lend realism to the actors' portrayals. Lindhome stated that the technician would explain how someone would react given a particular event, like getting shot or stabbed. Iliadis also felt that his experience working on Hardcore prepared him for this film. As Iliadis points out, Hardcore contained "very difficult scenes", such as a sixteen-year-old girl having an "existential breakdown during an orgy", which taught him how to make sure actors are being respected, as well as making sure that the scene is focused on the characters instead of simply going for "titillation".

For the ending of the film, Iliadis and the creative team chose to include the song "Dirge", by psychedelic rock band Death in Vegas. Iliadis was hoping to find something that was both "ironic" and "innocent" at the same time, given the events in the film that would precede its usage. To Iliadis, the choice helped to illuminate the fact that nothing will be the same for this family again. Craven commented on the choice to have John return to kill Krug at the end of the film. Craven explains, "I also found it interesting that the Dr., whose oath 'does no harm', intentionally [kills Krug] and that it kinda shows that when seeking revenge you can become something evil yourself if you don't stop once what's been necessary is done. So I also found it intriguing that we're just seeing these wonderful, perfect people but the father comes back and goes out of his way to do this."

== Release ==
The Last House on the Left was released on March 13, 2009, to 2,402 theaters. The MPAA ratings board ordered multiple cuts to the film to achieve a R-rating. The biggest setback by the board involved the rape scene. In the original cut of the film, the scene was at least one minute longer, but the board forced the scene to be trimmed if the filmmakers wanted an R-rating. There were other minor aspects trimmed as well, like an extended stabbing sequence with Paige. What shocked Craven was when the MPAA told them that this was a "special" film that did not "need" the extension on those scenes. Craven believed that the MPAA viewed the film more as an artistic horror film, which he sees as both a blessing and a curse. In Craven's experience, once the MPAA becomes focused on certain elements they dislike in horror films that they otherwise like, they become determined to see it removed before release. The DVD and Blu-ray copies of the film, which were released on August 18, 2009, contain both a rated and unrated cut. The DVD sales have brought in approximately $20 million in revenue.

== Reception ==
=== Box office ===
On its opening day, The Last House on the Left grossed $5.6 million, on 2,800 screens in 2,402 theaters, putting it slightly ahead of Watchmen, the previous weekend's top film. Over its opening weekend, The Last House on the Left grossed $14.1 million. By comparison, the 1972 original earned an estimated $3.1 million (unadjusted) during its entire box office run, equal to $16.5 million in 2009 dollars. The film went on to gross $45.3 million worldwide.

=== Critical response ===
On Rotten Tomatoes, The Last House on the Left holds an approval rating of 42% based on 167 reviews with an average rating of 5.1/10. The site's critics' consensus reads: "Excessive and gory, this remake lacks the intellectual punch of the 1972 original." Metacritic assigned the film a weighted average score of 42 out of 100 based on 27 critics, indicating "mixed or average reviews". Audiences polled by CinemaScore gave the film an average grade of "B" on an A+ to F scale, with exit polling showing that 57% of the audience was female, 60% was under 25, and with Hispanics and Caucasians making up 36% and 35%, respectively.

The San Francisco Chronicle's Peter Hartlaub felt the remake departed from the traditional template used by more recent remakes—"include twice as many kills, [find] boring young actors from TV shows, rewrite the script so you lose everything interesting about the original, [and] make up an excuse to add cell phones"—which ultimately made it far more effective. Hartlaub cited the script, which he felt devoted as much time to character development as "carnage", and the "good acting", particularly Tony Goldwyn, as reasons why this remake succeeds. In contrast, USA Today's Claudia Puig stated that director Dennis Iliadis failed at trying to keep the film from becoming another "torture porn". Puig felt that the killing scenes were too drawn out, noting the technique was down to heighten the effect, but actually comes across more as "repugnant and fetishized violence". She also noted that the parents seemed to find enjoyment in exacting their revenge, even when their daughter lay dying in the next room. Joe Neumaier of the New York Daily News was in agreement with Puig when he referred to the film as "stomach-churningly anti-human" because of its violence, and questioned why Goldwyn and Potter even signed on to the film. Neumaier suggests that the film's violence fails to create the sense of "theatricality of the Saw or Hostel films", or even provide audiences with "the unkillable-monster nostalgia of [the] Friday the 13th re-do". Neumaier also states that the 2009 film lacks the reasoning to exist that Craven's 1972 original had, which was to push the "boundaries of cinema's new permissiveness".

When comparing the 2009 film to its 1972 counterpart, Newsday's Rafer Guzman stated that Iliadis's film contains better "production values" than the 1972 original, but overall it keeps the "marrow of the story". Guzman suggests that some of the violence may have ventured too close to hysteria, and that this film is not like The Virgin Spring—which Guzman reminds that Roger Ebert "famously compared the original to"—but overall the film is "horribly, shamefully satisfying". Michael Phillips of the Chicago Tribune, who disliked the 1972 film and went so far as to call the original "unstable trash", found the remake to be a better film. Phillips noted that the 2009 film was well written—apart from a couple of moments that felt like they belonged in a different movie—well acted, and contains characters that seem like "real people [with] plausible behavior, amid plausible tension, borne of a terrible situation". He also suggests that, contrary to other critics' opinion, the 2009 remake does not attempt to follow the current trend of Hostel or Saw-like films simply because audiences are gravitating toward them as of late. Mark Olsen, of the Los Angeles Times, believes the 2009 remake is a "deeply misguided refraction of the original". Olsen points to what he feels is the addition of unnecessary back story for the family, and Iliadis's choice to film the rape scene in a "verdant, scenic forest", which gave the sequence an "art-directed falseness, draining the audience-implicating authenticity and replacing it with the easy distance of knowing entertainment". Olsen also felt that changing the trinket Mari holds in the original film to a keepsake from her deceased brother turns the family into "heroic characters" who appear to be "defending their entitlement to a rustic second home and vintage motorboat, not their right to exist".

Dennis Harvey of Variety believed that the film lacked in comparison to the 1972 original in almost every aspect. Harvey felt like the film spent more time trying to please current horror conventions than create an effective update to Craven's film. Harvey criticized the choice of changing a "credibly ordinary family" into a "typical modern movie-fantasy clan". He also noted that Dillahunt's portrayal of Krug is no match for David Hess. Michael Rechtshaffen, from The Hollywood Reporter, felt that the remake followed close to the original—something fans of the 1972 film would appreciate—but that the film lacked the timing of the Craven's film. Craven was responding to the graphic images being sent back during the Vietnam War and allowed his film "sociological context", while Iliadis's 2009 film comes across as "exploitative". Although Rechtshaffen points out that the parents lack the training and skill of Liam Neeson's character in Taken, the performances from all of the actors are "uniformly sturdy".

Lisa Kennedy of The Denver Post suggested that some viewers may want to leave the theater before finishing this movie, as Paige and Mari's fight to survive is "so disturbing" and "earnest", the murders and rapes so "verite" that it forced the reviewer to "fear for women in the audience who have been victims of rape". Yet, Kennedy believes the film manages to create a deeper message by identifying the "truly horrific" nature of what occurs by following the events with "a deep pause". Comparing this remake to the multiple Michael Bay slasher remakes, Kennedy states that this film "is not an idea-free flick", and that it "[engages] what the word 'horror' means". Roger Ebert, who gave the film a mildly positive review of 2.5 out of 4 stars, was also appalled by the rape sequence of the film, and noted that the rest of the violence seemed to fall within the standard of trying to invent new ways to kill people simply to please horror fans. At the same time, he praised the performances of Goldwyn, Potter, Paxton, and Dillahunt. He noted that the audience actually fears for the parents, and that Dillahunt is convincing as the "evil leader of a pack of degenerates".

== See also ==
- 1995 Okinawa rape incident
- List of films featuring home invasions
