= Solstice Studios =

American entertainment company

- Type: Private
- Industry: Film industry
- Founded: October 2, 2018
- Founder: Mark Gill
- Defunct: May 12, 2023
- Fate: Closed
- Headquarters: Los Angeles, California, U.S.
- Number of employees: 51–200
- Website: solstice-studios.com

Solstice Studios was a Los Angeles–based entertainment company, founded on October 2, 2018. The studio developed, fully financed, produced, sold internationally and distributed feature films in the United States on a wide-release basis.

== History ==
In May 2019, Solstice Studios announced Russell Crowe would star in Carl Ellsworth's thriller film, Unhinged. Principal photography took place in New Orleans from July 15 to August 23, 2019. It was released in the United States on August 21, 2020. The first film to receive a wide theatrical release in the midst of the COVID-19 pandemic, it grossed $44 million worldwide.

Solstice Studios announced a partnership with Studio 8 in November 2019, with Robert Rodriguez's Hypnotic as their first joint-project. Ben Affleck has been cast to star in the film. Affleck will play a "detective investigating a series of impossible high-end heists who becomes entangled in a mystery involving his missing daughter and a secret government program". Production was set to begin April 2020, but delayed due to the pandemic.

In September 2020, the studio acquired the distribution rights to the Mark Wahlberg drama film Joe Bell for $20 million. The distribution rights for the film were sold off to Roadside Attractions and Vertical Entertainment in May 2021 along with Plane to Lionsgate.

In October 2021, it was announced that Solstice had laid off a majority of its key executives, including its CEO, only less than a year after they had fired about twenty people in December 2020. This left only ten people on the Solstice Studios staff, which would oversee the completion of the film Hypnotic directed by Robert Rodriguez and starring Ben Affleck and Alice Braga, which was confirmed by a spokesperson of the company. The staff would stay on till fall the following year, after which Solstice would possibly shut down. However, Hypnotic was left without a domestic distributor as a result of the series of mass layoffs and was ultimately acquired by Ketchup Entertainment in February 2023, possibly meaning that Solstice had shut down in the interim.

== Films ==
Release date	Film	Notes
August 21, 2020	Unhinged	co-production with Ingenious Media and Burek Films, first movie
May 12, 2023	Hypnotic	co-production with Studio 8; distributed by Ketchup Entertainment, second and last movie
