= Marianne Maddalena =

American film producer (born 1962)

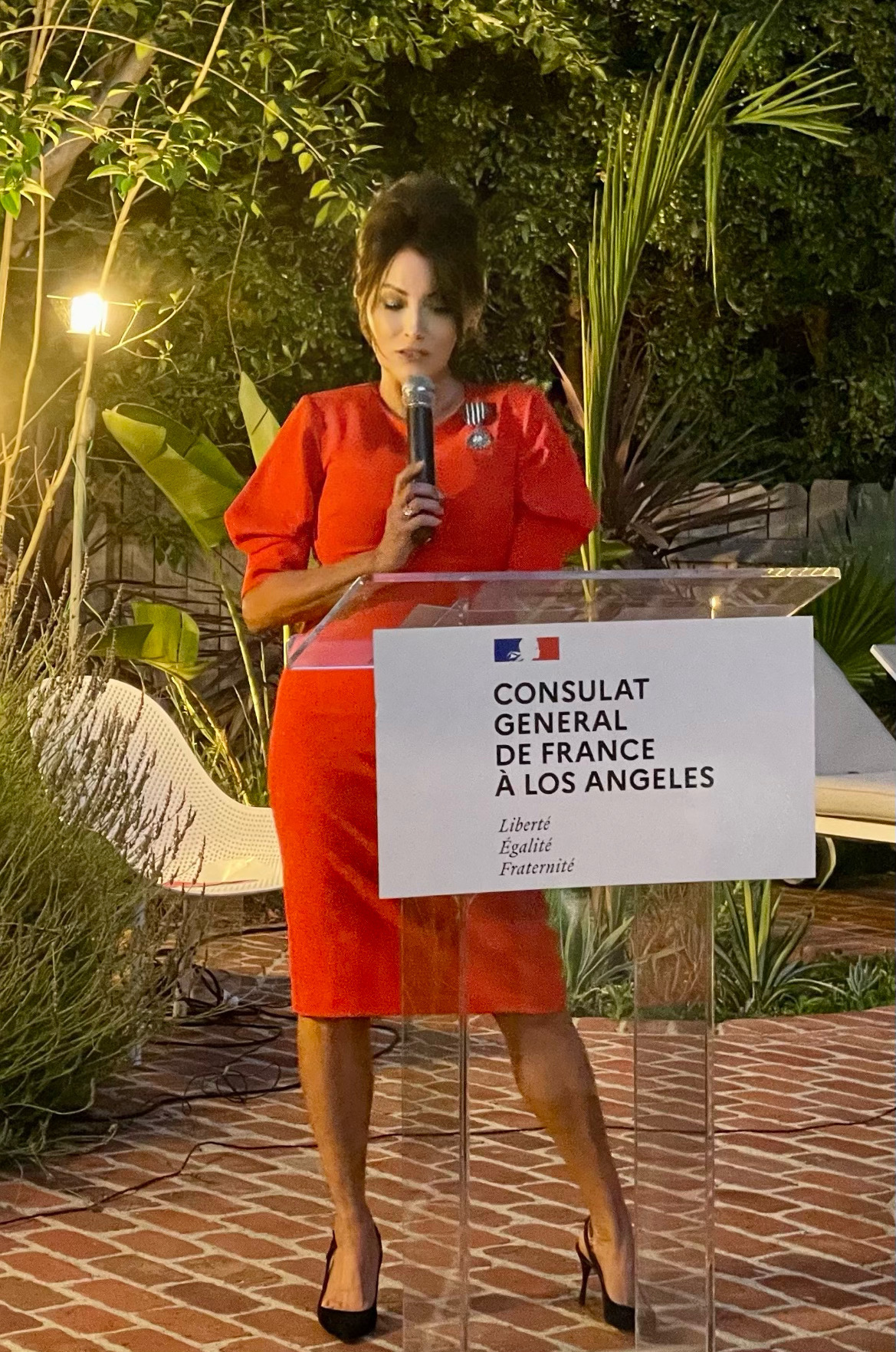
- Maddalena in 2022
- Born: Marianne Maddalena; July 7, 1962 (age 64); Lansing, Michigan, U.S.
- Occupation: Producer
- Years active: 1986–present
- Spouse: Mark Weeks (m. 1990; died 2008)

Marianne Maddalena (born July 7, 1962) is an American film and television producer best known for her long-standing creative partnership with filmmaker Wes Craven. Over a career spanning nearly four decades, Maddalena has played a role in the development of horror films, most notably the Scream franchise, as well as through the production company Craven/Maddalena Films.

== Early life and education ==
Maddalena was born in Lansing, Michigan. As a teenager, she lived in Cannes, France, during her senior year of high school.

== Career ==
=== Early career and meeting Wes Craven ===
Maddalena entered the film industry in the mid-1980s and met Wes Craven while seeking work as a production assistant. She was hired as Craven’s assistant on Deadly Friend (1986). During this period, Maddalena attended casting sessions, scoring meetings, and location scouts, gaining hands-on experience across production. According to Maddalena, Craven made a point of including her creatively, a practice that helped shape her transition into producing.

=== Producing partnership with Wes Craven ===
By the late 1980s, Maddalena had become a producing partner on Craven’s films. On the Wes Craven's New Nightmare DVD commentary, Craven described Maddalena’s role in his career, stating: “Marianne and I have been working in a partnership for almost ten years, and she has been my Guardian Angel of getting us through all the shoals of production and also an inspiration for many of the creative ideas that come through in the making of my horror pictures.”

Throughout the early 1990s, Maddalena produced or co-produced several of Craven’s films, including The Serpent and the Rainbow (1988), The People Under the Stairs (1991), Wes Craven’s New Nightmare (1994), and Vampire in Brooklyn (1995). New Nightmare was later nominated for Best Feature at the Independent Spirit Awards.

=== Scream franchise ===
Maddalena worked on the development and production of Scream (1996). While scouting locations in Santa Rosa, California, she discovered a white mask in an upstairs bedroom of a house being considered for filming and brought it to the attention of the production team. After initial resistance, the mask was revisited, modified, and ultimately became the Ghostface image associated with the franchise.

Maddalena produced all four Scream films directed by Craven: Scream (1996), Scream 2 (1997), Scream 3 (2000), and Scream 4 (2011). She later served as an executive producer on the television series Scream (2015–2019). Following Craven’s death in 2015, Maddalena continued her involvement with the franchise as an executive producer on Scream (2022), Scream VI (2023), and Scream 7 (2026).

=== Craven/Maddalena Films and later work ===
Maddalena and Craven co-founded Craven/Maddalena Films, expanding their work beyond horror. The company produced Music of the Heart (1999), which earned two Academy Award nominations, including Best Actress for Meryl Streep.

In the 2000s, Maddalena continued to collaborate closely with Craven on films such as Red Eye (2005) and The Hills Have Eyes (2006), with Craven serving as producer on both projects. The Hills Have Eyes marked the U.S. debut of filmmaker Alexandre Aja.

== Awards and recognition ==
- In 2021, Maddalena was appointed a Chevalier de l’Ordre des Arts et des Lettres by the French government, recognizing her career contributions.
- In 2017, she received a Career Achievement Award at the Screamfest Horror Film Festival.
- Wes Craven's New Nightmare (1994) was nominated for Best Feature at the Independent Spirit Awards.
- Music of the Heart (1999), produced under Craven/Maddalena Films, earned two Academy Award nominations, including Best Actress for Meryl Streep and Best Original Song.
- Scream 2 received a nomination from the Online Film & Television Association for Best Sci-Fi/Fantasy/Horror Picture.

== Filmography ==
- Shocker (1989)
- The People Under the Stairs (1991)
- Wes Craven's New Nightmare (1994)
- Vampire in Brooklyn (1995)
- Scream (1996)
- Scream 2 (1997)
- Music of the Heart (1999)
- Scream 3 (2000)
- Cursed (2005)
- Red Eye (2005)
- The Hills Have Eyes (2006)
- The Breed (2006)
- The Hills Have Eyes 2 (2007)
- New York, I Love You (2008)
- The Last House on the Left (2009)
- Scream 4 (2011)
- Scream: The Inside Story (2011) - Documentary film, herself
- Still Screaming: The Ultimate Scary Movie Retrospective (2011) - Documentary film, herself
- Scream (2015–2019)
- Scream (2022)
- Scream VI (2023)
- Scream 7 (2026)
