= +1 (film) =

2013 film by Dennis Iliadis

- Directed by: Dennis Iliadis
- Screenplay by: Bill Gullo
- Story by: Dennis Iliadis
- Produced by: Guy Botham
- Starring: Rhys Wakefield; Logan Miller; Ashley Hinshaw; Natalie Hall
- Cinematography: Mihai Mălaimare Jr.
- Edited by: Yorgos Mavropsaridis
- Music by: Nathan Larson
- Production companies: Process Films; Process Productions
- Distributed by: IFC Midnight
- Release dates: March 10, 2013 (SXSW); September 20, 2013
- Running time: 96 minutes
- Country: United States
- Language: English

+1 (also known as Plus One and Shadow Walkers) is a 2013 American science fiction horror film directed by Dennis Iliadis and starring Rhys Wakefield, Logan Miller, Ashley Hinshaw, and Natalie Hall. The film is about four college students, David, Jill, Teddy, and Allison, who attend a party. When the clocks at the party are set back in time an hour, there appears a duplicate of every single person in the party doing what they were doing an hour ago. The plot revolves around the characters' unique actions.

Dennis Iliadis and Bill Gullo wrote the script after Dennis asked himself three questions. He hired Lola Visual Effects to edit the film and introduce the duplicate effect at the end of the film. It was done using computer-generated animation, LED displays, actors, and footage editing. The film first premiered at the South by Southwest film festival on March 10, 2013. On July 27, 2013, IFC Films acquired the U.S. rights to +1. On January 14, 2014, IFC released the film on DVD for the first time.

== Plot ==
While on the phone with his girlfriend Jill, who has moved away to attend college, David prompts her to explicitly wish that he were there to see her compete in a fencing tournament, only to surprise her with an unplanned visit. After the competition, David approaches Jill's similarly attired opponent from behind and flirts with her, thinking she is his girlfriend. Intrigued, she kisses David, and Jill storms off angrily after walking in on them. Later, David meets with his friend Teddy, a sex-obsessed student who tells him that Jill will attend a house party later. Hoping that she will speak with him in person, David attends the party, too.

A meteor lands near the site of the party, and electrical arcs cause a momentary blackout. The wild revelers do not notice brief, anomalous phenomena that occur during the blackout, such as a mirror image out of sync, but a drug dealer's girlfriend outside the party becomes spooked. As the raucous party proceeds, David searches the house for Jill, and Teddy attempts to charm Melanie. To Teddy's surprise, Melanie invites him to join her upstairs in ten minutes. Meanwhile, David spies on Jill as she flirts with a friend, and Allison, an outsider, unsuccessfully attempts to fit in. David attempts to apologize to Jill, but she becomes angrier with his fumbled apology and says that he makes her feel replaceable. The party moves outside, and the house empties except for David, Teddy, Allison, and Melanie.

When Teddy joins Melanie upstairs, he finds her naked on a bed. They proceed to have sex, and she steps into the shower afterward. During a second blackout, a duplicate of Melanie appears on the bed, surprised to find Teddy in the room. When the original Melanie exits the shower, the two Melanies come face-to-face, and Teddy flees the room in a panic. David confirms that the house has filled with duplicates of the partygoers, who repeat the actions their originals took ten minutes ago. Outside, the drug dealer and his duplicate get into a violent confrontation, and David watches as one of them murders the other. Worried that the duplicates may be hostile, the originals attempt to hide. Eventually, the duplicates disappear.

With each blackout, the duplicates momentarily reappear and reenact increasingly more recent actions. David becomes convinced that he can save his relationship if he crafts a better apology to Jill's duplicate, Allison befriends her duplicate, and Teddy accidentally ruins the rendez-vous between his and Melanie's duplicates. Teddy warns the others that his duplicate will now become belligerent, and he convinces the partygoers, most of whom are still skeptical, to hide from their duplicates in a pool house. When the duplicates reappear, David knocks his own duplicate unconscious and charms Jill's duplicate, and Teddy's duplicate attempts to convince the skeptical crowd of duplicates to attack the originals.

Worried about their safety, several of the originals sneak out and murder their duplicates, which turns the enraged duplicates hostile. The originals retreat to the pool house, and the duplicates lay siege. The next blackout causes the duplicates to appear inside the pool house. The crowded room erupts in violence, and several people die, including Teddy. David tracks down the original Jill, who had wandered back to the house, and he murders her so that he can be with her duplicate. Allison seduces her duplicate, and they share a kiss. The final blackout causes the duplicates and originals to merge. David and Jill leave together and make their way to the pool house and have a make-out session. The confused partygoers stagger out of the pool house, and they begin to disperse. Two meteors, like the original, are shown passing through the sky and appear to be leaving Earth.

== Cast ==
- Rhys Wakefield as David
- Logan Miller as Teddy
- Ashley Hinshaw as Jill
- Natalie Hall as Melanie
- Rohan Kymal as Angad
- Suzanne and Colleen Dengel as Alison
- Adam David Thompson as Kyle

Additionally, Chrissy Chambers and Ronke Shonibare portray strippers Kitty and Katty, respectively. Hannah Kasulka appears as Jill's fencing opponent.

== Themes ==
Meredith McLean from The Au Review pointed out that the film had the theme of identity, identity crisis (specifically youth identity) and narcissism. She compared the film to the mindlessness of the adolescence and claimed the film wanted the viewer to be themselves.

=== Genre ===
Iliadis denies that the film was ever a horror film. He said it is a science fiction film in an interview with indienyc.com. However, in another interview with Icon vs. Icon, he explained that he attempted to make the movie interesting while combining several genres. In that same interview, he explained that some scenes of the film were horror and the other scenes were tender.

== Production ==
=== Script ===
In an interview, Dennis Iliadis said that he asked himself three questions:

- "what would happen if you could meet yourself?"
- "What would happen if you were in the same space with yourself and both versions of you were going after the same thing?"
- "what if this space was a wild party where all of the emotions are raw and "there's no time to be intellectual and process things?"

I don't think the key word is "horror". I think the film is more of a science fiction thriller. At the same time, these things help me take this science fiction idea and bring it into the horror genre once things get out of control. It's definitely a genre bender in the sense that it combines a lot of different elements. I think it belongs in the science fiction thriller mold, but it's a genre film that combines a few things.

— Dennis Iliadis, interview with Diabolique Magazine

Dennis chose to set the story at a teen house party because of the risk. He wanted it specifically because it was "fun, raunchy, and messy". He then wrote a short paragraph and presented it to Bill Gullo. He converted it into a full script.

=== Visual effects ===
Lola Visual Effects helped produce the images of the duplicates interacting with one another by using visual effects and CGI. They used their own facial rig (which they made specifically for The Social Network) to make the duplicates. They recorded a person interacting with another person wearing the same clothes, and then they would recreate the scene in another facility with a rigid chair inside a bank of LED panels that surround the actor. They then merged the footage together in order to create the duplicate interaction footage.

== Release ==
=== Premiere ===
It premiered on March 10, 2013, at SXSW. +1 was released in theaters, iTunes, and VOD on September 20, 2013. For the VOD release Iliadis worked on fine-tuning elements of the film, as he felt that the SXSW release was too "rushed".

=== DVD ===
IFC released +1 on DVD on 14 January 2014. The special features include a commentary track, visual effects behind-the-scenes featurette, deleted scenes, interviews with cast & crew, poster gallery, cast auditions, and trailers.

== Reception ==
Rotten Tomatoes reports that 82% of 11 surveyed critics gave the film a positive review; the average rating was 6.6/10. Metacritic rated it 60/100 based on six reviews. Jeannette Catsoulis of The New York Times made it a NYT Critics' Pick and called it "a fleet and frenzied sci-fi tale with more on its mind than alien gate-crashers." Chuck Bowen of Slant Magazine gave the film three out of four stars, commenting that Iliadis did a good job of showing the "existential despair" of narcissism and detachment. Scott Weinberg of Fearnet gave a more mixed review, saying that the film was a "decent, uneven, well-made spin on a very standard horror story". In a mixed review, Geoff Berkshire of Variety called it a "trippy oddity" with "a tantalizing visual puzzle that demands full attention, even as the flavorless characters and largely so-so performances risk audience indifference." Berkshire states the film's "overriding misogyny" may be intentional satire.

== Acquisition by IFC Films ==
On July 27, 2013, IFC Films acquired the U.S. rights to +1. Jonathan Sehring, the president of IFC films, claimed that the company intended to introduce the film to a wider audience.
