= Starve (film) =

- Directed by: Griff Furst
- Written by: Xander Wolf
- Produced by: Griff Furst; Rufus Parker; Sukhi Pabla
- Starring: Bobby Campo; Mariah Bonner; Dave Davis; Cooper Huckabee
- Cinematography: Mark Rutledge
- Edited by: Griff Furst; Chris Villa
- Music by: Andy Garfield
- Production company: P2 Films
- Release date: 2014
- Running time: 102 minutes
- Country: United States
- Language: English

Starve is a 2014 American horror film directed by Griff Furst and written by Xander Wolf. The film stars Bobby Campo, Mariah Bonner, Dave Davis and Cooper Huckabee.

== Plot ==
Comic book author Beck, his girlfriend Candice, and Beck's brother Jiminey set out to find a ghost town. Beck hopes to find inspiration for his new comic book in "Freedom". The once-thriving town is said to have been the site of a massive methane gas explosion, and according to legend, feral children roam its ruins. But before they reach the town, their windshield is shattered by a thrown rock. Shortly after, they arrive at a small diner where they are warned that the town is in danger of collapsing and that they should turn back.

The three ignore all warnings. While inspecting one of the houses, their car is stolen. Shortly afterward, they are all overpowered and find themselves in an old school. There, housed separately, the prisoners are forced to fight each other for food in a life-or-death struggle. They are systematically starved to make this happen.

After several fights, Jiminey and Beck are forced to face each other. Jiminey sacrifices himself for his brother, but since he chooses suicide, Beck doesn't get the meal he craves. Beck eventually manages to fight his way to Candice. The two attempt to escape, but the deranged Michael and his mutated wife prevent their escape at the last second.

Michael, who was forced to eat his own children after the methane gas leak and is therefore conducting these experiments, then sets the two against each other. Beck fakes his death and is thus able to overpower Michael's wife. During their escape, they manage to kill Michael and alert the police. When the police arrive, the two police officers are overpowered by Michael's wife.

== Cast ==
- Bobby Campo as Beck
- Mariah Bonner as Candice
- Dave Davis as Jiminey
- Cooper Huckabee as the Principal
- Jessica Lemon Wilkinson as a detective

== Release ==
"Starve" premiered at the Sitges International Film Festival in Spain before being broadcast as part of Syfy's 31 Days of Halloween programming in October 2014.

== Reception ==
The Hollywood Reporter called the film a derivative horror movie and compared it to the Saw series, but praised the abandoned school setting and production design. Michael DeFellipo of Horror Society praised the acting and the way the movie was put together. He gave it a 6 out of 10 and said the writing and the way it was directed did not make the best use of the idea. HorrorNews.net praised the concept and the connection, between Beck and Candice and the work of Cooper Huckabee. They said other movies did the themes better. Nerds That Geek praised the survival concept and the way hunger pushes the characters toward violence.
