= Lola Visual Effects =

American motion picture company

- Industry: Film; Computer animation; Visual effects
- Founded: January 2004; 22 years ago
- Headquarters: Los Angeles, California, U.S.
- Number of locations: New York City, New York, U.S.; New Orleans, Louisiana, U.S.; London, England
- Services: Visual effects; Advertising
- Website: lolavfx.com

Lola Visual Effects (stylized as lola | VFX, also known simply as Lola) is an American visual effects company that specializes in the production of computer-generated visual effects for film and television. Lola was founded in January 2004 and is owned and operated by the founders—Edson Williams and Thomas Nittmann. Headquarters are located in Los Angeles with subsidiaries in New York City, New Orleans, and London. Lola was the first visual effects company to offer digital cosmetic enhancements to alter an actor's on-screen film appearance; the service is similar to "photoshopping" a still image of a person but significantly more complex as there are multiple frames, actor movement, lighting changes, and camera moves. In 2006, Lola completed the first digital age reduction on Magneto and Professor X on the feature film X-Men: The Last Stand.

== Locations ==
Lola has offices in the following locations:

- (United States) Los Angeles
- (United States) New York City
- (United States) New Orleans
- (United Kingdom) London

== Filmography ==
- Indian 3 (TBD)
- Raaka
- Moana (2026)
- Peddi (2026)
- Daredevil: Born Again (2026)
- Parasakthi (2026}
- Tron: Ares (2025)
- Snow White (2025)
- The Electric State (2025)
- Kalki 2898 AD (2024)
- The Greatest of All Time (2024)
- The Marvels (2023)
- Guardians of the Galaxy Vol. 3 (2023)
- Fast X (2023)
- Ghosted (2023)
- Creed III (2023)
- Glass Onion: A Knives Out Mystery (2022)
- Moonfall (2022)
- Black Adam (2022)
- Disenchanted (2022)
- The Adam Project (2022)
- Thor: Love and Thunder (2022)
- West Side Story (2021)
- Free Guy (2021)
- No Time to Die (2021)
- Black Widow (2021)
- It Chapter Two (2019)
- Avengers: Endgame (2019)
- Togo (2019)
- Captain Marvel (2019)
- Vice (2018)
- Creed II (2018)
- Robin Hood (2018)
- Fantastic Beasts: The Crimes of Grindelwald (2018)
- Instant Family (2018)
- A Star Is Born (2018)
- Christopher Robin (2018)
- Asura (2018)
- Ant-Man and the Wasp (2018)
- Jurassic World: Fallen Kingdom (2018)
- Set It Up (2018)
- Action Point (2018)
- Solo: A Star Wars Story (2018)
- Book Club (2018)
- Avengers: Infinity War (2018)
- The Week Of (2018)
- Tomb Raider (2018)
- A Wrinkle in Time (2018)
- Black Panther (2018)
- Phantom Thread (2017)
- The Post (2017)
- Bright (2017)
- Downsizing (2017)
- Father Figures (2017)
- The Greatest Showman (2017)
- Wonder (2017)
- Daddy's Home 2 (2017)
- Battle of the Sexes (2017)
- First They Killed My Father (2017)
- The Glass Castle (2017)
- The Mummy (2017)
- Pirates of the Caribbean: Dead Men Tell No Tales (2017)
- Baywatch (2017)
- Snatched (2017)
- Guardians of the Galaxy Vol. 2 (2017)
- The Fate of the Furious (2017)
- Ghost in the Shell (2017)
- Beauty and the Beast (2017)
- Logan (2017)
- Bitter Harvest (2017)
- Rings (2017)
- xXx: Return of Xander Cage (2017)
- A Cure for Wellness (2016)
- The Great Wall (2016)
- Live by Night (2016)
- Monster Trucks (2016)
- Allied (2016)
- Doctor Strange (2016)
- American Pastoral (2016)
- Jack Reacher: Never Go Back (2016)
- The Birth of a Nation (2016)
- Sully (2016)
- Suicide Squad (2016)
- The Legend of Tarzan (2016)
- The Shallows (2016)
- Teenage Mutant Ninja Turtles: Out of the Shadows (2016)
- X-Men: Apocalypse (2016)
- Captain America: Civil War (2016)
- Allegiant (2016)
- Crouching Tiger, Hidden Dragon: Sword of Destiny (2016)
- Zoolander 2 (2016)
- Ride Along 2 (2016)
- Carol (2015)
- Joy (2015)
- Point Break (2015)
- The Big Short (2015)
- The Hunger Games: Mockingjay - Part 2 (2015)
- By the Sea (2015)
- The Last Witch Hunter (2015)
- Black Mass (2015)
- Straight Outta Compton (2015)
- Mission: Impossible – Rogue Nation (2015)
- Pixels (2015)
- Ant-Man (2015)
- Terminator Genisys (2015)
- Avengers: Age of Ultron (2015)
- Furious 7 (2015)
- Insurgent (2015)
- American Sniper (2014)
- Unbroken (2014)
- Night at the Museum: Secret of the Tomb (2014)
- The Hunger Games: Mockingjay - Part 1 (2014)
- Gone Girl (2014)
- Teenage Mutant Ninja Turtles (2014)
- The Hundred-Foot Journey (2014)
- Guardians of the Galaxy (2014)
- X-Men: Days of Future Past (2014)
- Captain America: The Winter Soldier (2014)
- Divergent (2014)
- Endless Love (2014)
- Labor Day (2013)
- Grudge Match (2013)
- The Secret Life of Walter Mitty (2013)
- The Wolf of Wall Street (2013)
- American Hustle (2013)
- Anchorman 2: The Legend Continues (2013)
- RED 2 (2013)
- The Lone Ranger (2013)
- World War Z (2013)
- Fast & Furious 6 (2013)
- Iron Man 3 (2013)
- G.I. Joe: Retaliation (2013)
- +1 (2013)
- Warm Bodies (2013)
- The Company You Keep (2012)
- Bullet to the Head (2012)
- Les Misérables (2012)
- Life of Pi (2012)
- The Twilight Saga: Breaking Dawn - Part 2 (2012)
- Skyfall (2012)
- Cloud Atlas (2012)
- The Bourne Legacy (2012)
- Prometheus (2012)
- Snow White and the Huntsman (2012)
- Battleship (2012)
- The Avengers (2012)
- Haywire (2011)
- The Girl with the Dragon Tattoo (2011)
- Hugo (2011)
- The Twilight Saga: Breaking Dawn - Part 1 (2011)
- J. Edgar (2011)
- Rise of the Planet of the Apes (2011)
- The Smurfs (2011)
- Captain America: The First Avenger (2011)
- Harry Potter and the Deathly Hallows – Part 2 (2011)
- Your Highness (2011)
- I Am Number Four (2011)
- Morning Glory (2010)
- Life as We Know It (2010)
- The Social Network (2010)
- The Twilight Saga: Eclipse (2010)
- Robin Hood (2010)
- Iron Man 2 (2010)
- Percy Jackson & the Olympians: The Lightning Thief (2010)
- Tooth Fairy (2010)
- The Book of Eli (2010)
- Case 39 (2009)
- Up in the Air (2009)
- Avatar (2009)
- Orphan (2009)
- Dance Flick (2009)
- Star Trek (2009)
- X-Men Origins: Wolverine (2009)
- Obsessed (2009)
- Crossing Over (2009)
- Management (2008)
- Bedtime Stories (2008)
- Marley & Me (2008)
- The Curious Case of Benjamin Button (2008)
- Twilight (2008)
- The Secret Life of Bees (2008)
- The Love Guru (2008)
- The Incredible Hulk (2008)
- You Don't Mess with the Zohan (2008)
- Speed Racer (2008)
- Iron Man (2008)
- Made of Honor (2008)
- Nim's Island (2008)
- Jumper (2008)
- P.S. I Love You (2007)
- Mama's Boy (2007)
- The Invasion (2007)
- I Now Pronounce You Chuck & Larry (2007)
- Fantastic 4: Rise of the Silver Surfer (2007)
- Expired (2007)
- Freedom Writers (2007)
- 300 (2006)
- Night at the Museum (2006)
- Babel (2006)
- The Departed (2006)
- My Super Ex-Girlfriend (2006)
- Click (2006)
- X-Men: The Last Stand (2006)
- Poseidon (2006)
- Mission: Impossible III (2006)
- Failure to Launch (2006)
- Ask the Dust (2006)
- Kiss Kiss Bang Bang (2005)
- Flightplan (2005)
- Sky High (2005)
- Fully Loaded (2005)
- The Longest Yard (2005)
- Ice Princess (2005)
- The Princess Diaries 2: Royal Engagement (2004)
- White Chicks (2004)
