= A Breed Apart (2025 American film) =

- Directed by: Griff Furst; Nathan Furst
- Written by: Griff Furst; Nathan Furst
- Based on: The Breed by: Robert Conte; Peter Martin Wortmann
- Produced by: Griff Furst; Adam Champ; Ray Moheet
- Starring: Grace Caroline Currey; Virginia Gardner; Hayden Panettiere
- Cinematography: Jon Keng
- Edited by: Griff Furst; Nathan Furst
- Music by: Britlin Lee Furst
- Production companies: Curmudgeon Films; Daro Film Distribution
- Distributed by: Lionsgate
- Release date: May 16, 2025
- Running time: 100 minutes
- Country: United States
- Language: English

A Breed Apart is a 2025 American horror comedy film written and directed by Griff Furst and Nathan Furst and starring Grace Caroline Currey, Virginia Gardner and Hayden Panettiere (in her penultimate film role). It is a meta-sequel to the 2006 film The Breed.

== Plot ==
Thirteen years ago a low budget film is being made on a tropical island. The plot of the film involves using a pack of tame dogs made to look vicious by licking pig’s blood off the lead actress, who refuses to be covered with blood despite the director’s assurance that everything is perfectly safe. Meanwhile, the dog handlers discover a loose dog has been bitten by a bat, becomes rabid, and aggressively kills every dog handlers. The film production funds run out, shutdown, and everyone assumes the dog handlers took off, abandoning the dogs on the island.

Present day, the island is bought by an eager promoter who invites a group of popular superficial social influencers to participate in a contest of capturing the poor abandoned “Hollywood dogs” who need rescued. The person who captures the most dogs wins the deed to the island and the rights to stream the show on the internet. Everyone is happy to make money and the promoter introduces the group to some of the “tail waggers” he has captured and caged in the back. After calmly taking a treat from the over confident promoter, the dog goes from friendly to vicious and quickly kills the promoter.

For the rest of the movie, the obtuse shallow influencers try to stay ahead of a pack of rabid dogs that the virus has mutated into hyper-aggressive and hyper-intelligent super dogs. Some bitten male influencers become rabid and side with the pack. After obtaining weapons, the surviving emboldened influencers turn the tables on the pack and escape the island. The last scene shows an abandoned bitten male influencer becoming rabid and joining the pack.

== Cast ==
- Grace Caroline Currey as Violet
- Virginia Gardner as Thalia Hearst
- Hayden Panettiere as Hayden Hearst
- Joey Bragg as Vince Vertura
- Troy Gentile as Mason Kelly
- Riele Downs as Queen
- Page Kennedy as Big Farmer Jay

== Production ==
In June 2024, it was announced that Gardner and Currey were cast in the film, with filming occurring in Guatemala. In August 2024, it was announced that Panettiere and other cast members were cast in the film.

== Release ==
The film was released in theaters and on demand and digital on May 16, 2025.

== Reception ==
The film has an 18% rating on Rotten Tomatoes based on 11 reviews. Grant Hermanns of Screen Rant rated the film a 3 out of 10. Chad Collins of Dread Central awarded the film one and a half stars out of five. Josh Bell of Crooked Marquee graded the film a D-.

== See also ==
- Anaconda (2025)
