= Unhinged (2020 film) =

2020 film by Derrick Borte

- Theatrical release poster
- Directed by: Derrick Borte
- Written by: Carl Ellsworth
- Produced by: Lisa Ellzey; Andrew Gunn; Mark Gill
- Starring: Russell Crowe; Caren Pistorius; Gabriel Bateman; Jimmi Simpson; Austin P. McKenzie
- Cinematography: Brendan Galvin
- Edited by: Steve Mirkovich; Michael McCusker; Tim Mirkovich
- Music by: David Buckley
- Production companies: Ingenious Media; Burek Films
- Distributed by: Solstice Studios
- Release dates: July 16, 2020 (Germany); August 21, 2020 (United States)
- Running time: 93 minutes
- Country: United States
- Language: English
- Budget: $33 million
- Box office: $44.3 million

Unhinged is a 2020 American action thriller film directed by Derrick Borte, from a screenplay by Carl Ellsworth. The film stars Russell Crowe, Caren Pistorius, Gabriel Bateman, Jimmi Simpson, and Austin P. McKenzie, and follows Rachel Flynn (Pistorius), whose family and friends are targeted by an unnamed man (Crowe) after a traffic incident.

Unhinged was theatrically released by Solstice Studios in Germany on July 16, 2020, and in the United States on August 21, 2020. The film was notable for being the first wide theatrical release in several months, due to the COVID-19 pandemic, and grossed $44 million worldwide. It received mixed reviews from critics, who praised Crowe's performance, but felt that the film did not take full advantage of its thrilling premise.

== Plot ==
In the midst of rain at 4:03am, Tom Cooper is parked outside of his ex-wife's house. He is in pain and consumes one tablet of hydrocodone. He then removes his wedding ring, tossing it with contempt into the back seat. Tom grabs a hammer, a can of gasoline, and breaks into the house where he kills his ex-wife and her boyfriend. He then sets the house aflame. It explodes as he drives away. A news report states that Tom had a history of substance abuse and violence, and a restraining order was placed on him by his ex-wife after 12 months of repeated domestic disturbances.

The following morning, Rachel Flynn, in the middle of a divorce process and mother of teenager Kyle, drives her son to school during rush hour traffic. As she is running late to work, one of her clients fires her over the phone. She then honks at Tom's pickup truck, which is blocking traffic at a green light. He catches up to Rachel and tries to apologize, then asks for an apology in return, saying that he wants to "hit reset", and that "people should apologize for anything they do wrong". Rachel says that she has nothing to apologize for. In return, Tom promises to teach her "what it means to have a bad day". At the end of the road, Tom drives in front of Rachel and stops. He then drives away. Unsettled, she arranges to meet her friend Andy, who is also her divorce lawyer, at a diner.

Tom tracks Rachel to a gas station and switches his phone with hers while she is inside paying for her gas. Rachel sees him outside and gets help from a customer who accompanies her back to her car. The customer gets Tom's license plate number but is then rammed by the truck, which leads him to getting hit and killed by another car. A chase ensues, during which Tom shows Rachel that he has her phone. He uses her daily planner to locate Andy at the diner. Before she can warn Andy, Tom beats and stabs him to death in front of everyone while being filmed by a customer. Tom tells Rachel over the phone that she must choose another one of her contacts to die next. He suggests her ex-husband, her mother, or Kyle. She instead names the client who fired her, then calls the police, who respond to the client's home while Rachel races to Kyle's school.

Meanwhile, Rachel's brother Fred is at her home watching a news report about the diner incident. According to the report, Tom worked as middle manager of an auto plant, where he was fired just shy of his pension after suffering a bad injury. Due to the injury, he became addicted to substances and was unable to find steady work for a year. At some point, he got a job at a maintenance company, and was fired just a day ago after being employed there for less than a month. Tom breaks into the home and beats up Fred's fiancée Mary. Tom confronts him, holding a battered Mary hostage, declaring that all he has left is violence and retribution, before repeatedly pushing her into Fred's knife, killing her. He then ties Fred to a chair and tells Rachel over the phone that she has three minutes to go into the school, get Kyle, and drive away, or he will kill Fred, as he wants him to read a letter about how Rachel is an "entitled self-centered person". Rachel desperately demands that the principal release Kyle. She gets Kyle and drives away. Tom forces a distressed Fred to read the letter to Rachel over the phone. When a police officer arrives at Rachel's house, Tom sets Fred on fire. The cop shoots Tom in the shoulder and tries to put the fire out. Tom escapes and catches up to Rachel and Kyle on a highway. They use a GPS app to learn that Tom is in a minivan (for which he killed someone) and is directly in front of them. When they attempt to alert a nearby officer, Tom rams his car, causing a multi-vehicle car accident.

Tom pursues Rachel to her mother's house where Kyle triggers a silent alarm and hides. Rachel rams the van that Tom is driving, flipping the vehicle. Tom gets out, attacks Rachel, and enters the house in search of Kyle, intent on killing him next. As Tom is about to leave, Kyle inadvertently alerts him to his hiding place upstairs. Rachel comes to and enters the house to protect Kyle, but Tom finds her and they struggle, Kyle attacking Tom. When Tom begins to strangle Kyle, Rachel stabs Tom in the eye with a pair of scissors, killing him.

The police arrive and inform Rachel that Fred survived the attack. Rachel and Kyle leave to see Fred at the hospital. As they drive away, a car cuts Rachel off and she stops herself from honking at the angry driver. Kyle observes this and says "good choice." They continue driving.

== Cast ==
- Russell Crowe as Tom Cooper (credited as The Man), a mentally unstable stranger.
- Caren Pistorius as Rachel Flynn, Kyle's mother.
- Gabriel Bateman as Kyle Flynn, Rachel's son.
- Jimmi Simpson as Andy, Rachel's friend and divorce lawyer
- Austin P. McKenzie as Fred, Rachel's brother.
- Juliene Joyner as Mary, Fred's girlfriend
- Stephen Louis Grush as Leo, gas station customer who saves Rachel from Tom
- Anne Leighton as Deborah Haskell, Rachel's client
- Michael Papajohn as Homer
- Lucy Faust as Rosie
- Devyn Tyler as Mrs. Ayers
- Samantha Beaulieu as Cashier
- Andrew Morgado as Richard Flynn, Rachel's ex-husband and Kyle's father.

== Production ==
Principal photography took place in the summer of 2019 in Kenner and New Orleans, Louisiana. Production was completed in September 2019.

== Release ==
Unhinged was originally scheduled to be released on August 28, 2020, before being pushed back to September 4. In May 2020, its release was moved up to July 1, 2020, in order to "likely be the first to test the waters as theaters try to rebound" from the COVID-19 pandemic. The date was later pushed back to July 10, then July 31, and, on July 23, the film was again delayed, this time to August 21, 2020.

The film began a premium video on demand release on October 20, 61 days after opening in theaters. Normally if distributors put a film on VOD before the 75-day window, theaters will stop showing it; however, given the pandemic, exhibitors felt it "remains a welcome addition to a limited release schedule".

The film began an international release on July 16 in Germany, and then on July 31 in the United Kingdom, Europe, Australia, Asia, and Latin America. The film was released in Ecuador on August 6, and by VVS Films in Canada on August 14, 2020.

=== Home media ===
Unhinged was released on 4K Blu-ray in Germany on November 27, 2020 and on Blu-ray and DVD in the United Kingdom on November 23, 2020.

== Reception ==
=== Box office ===
Unhinged grossed $20.8 million in the United States and Canada, and $23.5 million in other territories, for a worldwide total of $44.3 million.

In its opening weekend in Canada, the film made $601,032 from 299 theaters. Playing in both the United States and Canada the following weekend, the film grossed $1.4 million from 1,823 theaters on its first day, and went on to debut to $4 million over the weekend; 71% of the audience was over the age of 25, with 56% being male. It was the first film with a weekend gross of over $1 million since Onward in March, and despite theater chains reopening some locations the top-five grossing venues were all drive-ins. Deadline Hollywood noted the increase of ticket sales from Friday to Saturday was likely an indication of audience interest moving forward, while The Hollywood Reporter called the film's debut a win, and said studio executives were "pleased by the results." Playing in 2,331 theaters the following weekend, the film made $2.8 million (a drop of 35%), finishing second behind newcomer The New Mutants. In its third, fourth, fifth weekends of release in the U.S. the film made $1.7 million, $1.5 million, and $1.3 million, respectively, with drive-in theaters remaining its top venues.

Unhinged grossed $251,849 from 380 theaters in its German debut, slightly below expectations but finishing in first place. In its second weekend the film made $201,655 from 438 theaters for a 12-day total in the country of $530,572. In the film's United Kingdom debut, it grossed $230,000 (£174,901) from 250 theaters, becoming the first film to make over £100,000 in the country since the re-opening. By its third week of release, beginning August 7, Unhinged was the top film in six of about 50 countries, and had a running international gross of $5.41 million. Its top markets at the time were Australia ($1.24 million total gross), Germany ($877,000), the Netherlands ($597,000), the United Kingdom ($575,000), New Zealand ($193,000), and Russia ($124,000). It continued to hold the top spot in the UK and Australia the following weekend, with a global running total of $7.7 million.

=== Critical response ===
On review aggregator Rotten Tomatoes, Unhinged holds an approval rating of 48% based on 203 reviews, with an average score of 5.3/10. The website's critics consensus reads, "Russell Crowe makes for a compulsively watchable villain, but Unhinged lacks enough intelligence or depth to get sufficient mileage out of its pulpy premise." On Metacritic, the film has a weighted average score of 40 out of 100, based on 36 critics, indicating "mixed or average reviews".

Guy Lodge of Variety said the film "delivers exactly the nasty B-movie thrills you expect," and wrote, "The carnage is the point here, not any of the reasoning behind it, and Borte and Crowe bring it to a suitably frothing, furious head." Writing for CTV News, Richard Crouse gave the film two stars and specified, "Unhinged distinguishes itself by keeping the pedal to the metal without providing anything new in the way of thrills. As a study of an emasculated man seeking revenge it brings to mind Falling Down, Michael Douglas' 1993 black comedy, except Unhinged is all darkness and no comedy."

Writing for IndieWire, Kaleem Aftab gave the film a "D" and said, "For a film so reliant on the telephone, it's probably not a surprise that Crowe dials in his performance. Dressed heavy-set, Crowe is all grimaces and frowns in disgust at everything around him. His only emotional note is all ANGRY, resulting in a parody of his own performances. It's Crowe on overdrive, and it's horrible."

== See also ==
- Road rage
- Duel
- The Hitcher
- Joy Ride
- Changing Lanes
- Breakdown
