= Carl Ellsworth =

American screenwriter

- Born: September 28, 1972 (age 53); Louisville, Kentucky
- Occupation: Screenwriter

Carl Ellsworth is an American screenwriter, best known for writing Red Eye, Disturbia and The Last House on the Left.

== Filmography ==
=== Television ===
- Buffy the Vampire Slayer (1997)
- Mowgli: The New Adventures of the Jungle Book (1998)
- Mortal Kombat: Conquest (1998)
- Animorphs (1998-1999)
- Godzilla:The Series (2000)
- Xena: Warrior Princess (2000)
- Cleopatra 2525 (2000-2001)
- The Legend of Tarzan (2001)
- Star Wars: The Clone Wars (2009-2010)

=== Film ===
- Red Eye (2005)
- Disturbia (2007)
- The Last House on the Left (2009)
- Red Dawn (2012)
- Unhinged (2020)
