= Griff Furst =

American actor and film director (born 1981)

Griff Furst

Griff Furst (born September 17, 1981, in Van Nuys, California) is an American actor, film producer, and film director.

Furst has appeared in over a hundred television and film productions. In 2011 a Variety article singled him out with Antoni Corone as "[an actor] who can make a big impression with only a few scenes".

He is vice-president of Curmudgeon Films, founded with his father, Stephen Furst, which has produced films including Cold Moon, Nightmare Shark, You Might Be the Killer, Sinfidelity, Black Market Baby, and 57 Seconds. He also co-wrote and directed Cold Moon and the 2011 film Mask Maker.

== Selected filmography ==
- 2000 Stageghost as Rob
- 2004 Boa vs. Python
- 2007 Take as Young Mechanic
- 2008 Living Proof as Charlie Wilson
- 2009 I Love You Phillip Morris as Mark
- 2009 Tribute (TV Movie) as Brian Morrow
- 2010 Movin' In
- 2011 Green Lantern as UCAV Operator 1
- 2012 Transit as Lieutenant B. Morgan
- 2014 Starve
- 2015 Focus as Gareth
- 2015 Terminator Genisys as Agent Burke
- 2016 The Founder as Jim Zien
- 2018 Steel Country as Max Himmler
- 2019 Dead Water as David Cooper
- 2022 A Tale of Two Guns
- 2025 A Breed Apart
