= Dennis Iliadis =

Greek film director (born 1969)

- Born: 31 December 1969 (age 56); Athens, Greece
- Education: Brown University; Royal College of Art
- Occupation: Film director

Dennis Iliadis (born 31 December 1969) is a Greek film director. He is best known for his work on The Last House on the Left.

== Biography ==
Born in Athens, Iliadis grew up between Athens, Paris and Rio de Janeiro. He attended Brown University and the Royal College of Art. He has worked on films such as Hardcore, The Last House on the Left, and +1. At the 2009 Brussels International Fantastic Film Festival, he won the Silver Raven Award for his work on The Last House on the Left.

== Filmography ==
Feature films

- Hardcore (2004)
- The Last House on the Left (2009)
- +1 (2013)
- Delirium (2018)
- He's Out There (2018) (credited as Quinn Lasher)

== Awards ==
- 2009 Brussels International Fantastic Film Festival: Silver Raven Award (The Last House on the Left)
