= Hardcore (2004 film) =

2004 Greek drama film

- Directed by: Dennis Iliadis
- Produced by: Fenia Cossovitsa; Dennis Iliadis; Iraklis Mavroidis
- Starring: Katerina Tsavalou; Danae Skiadi; Ioannis Papazisis; Omiros Poulakis; Andreas Marianos; Dimitris Liolios; Konstadinos Avarikiotis; Yannis Stankoglou; Antonis Peratikos; Stelios Christoforidis; Yannis Stefopoulos; Vyzantia Guy Pyriohou; Pigi Roumani; Venia Roumani; Constantine Markoulakis; Alexandros Mitsopoulos
- Cinematography: Thimios Bakatakis
- Edited by: Yorgos Mavropsaridis
- Music by: Christos Lainas; Coti K.
- Release date: 12 March 2004
- Running time: 96 minutes
- Country: Greece
- Language: Greek

Hardcore is a 2004 Greek drama film directed by Dennis Iliadis and produced by Fenia Cossovitsa, Dennis Iliadis, Iraklis Mavroidis. The film stars Katerina Tsavalou, Danae Skiadi, Ioannis Papazisis, Omiros Poulakis and Andreas Marianos in the lead roles.

== Story ==
Leaving behind a hard life with their families, two young girls end up in a brothel, fall in love and support one another against the adversities and violence of the night.

== Cast ==
- Katerina Tsavalou as Martha
- Danae Skiadi as Nandia
- Ioannis Papazisis as Argyris
- Omiros Poulakis as Miltos
- Andreas Marianos as Boss
- Dimitris Liolios as Sentimental
- Konstadinos Avarikiotis as Sfyrihtras (Whistle)
- Yannis Stankoglou as Zois
- Antonis Peratikos
- Stelios Christoforidis
- Yannis Stefopoulos as Martha's Customer
- Vyzantia Guy Pyriohou as Maria
- Pigi Roumani as Twin
- Venia Roumani as Twin
- Konstantinos Markoulakis as himself
- Alexandros Mitsopoulos as man in the party
