= Red Eye (2005 American film) =

2005 film by Wes Craven

- Theatrical release poster
- Directed by: Wes Craven
- Screenplay by: Carl Ellsworth
- Story by: Carl Ellsworth; Dan Foos
- Produced by: Chris Bender; Marianne Maddalena
- Starring: Rachel McAdams; Cillian Murphy; Brian Cox
- Cinematography: Robert Yeoman
- Edited by: Patrick Lussier; Stuart Levy
- Music by: Marco Beltrami
- Production companies: DreamWorks Pictures; BenderSpink; Craven-Maddalena Films
- Distributed by: DreamWorks Pictures
- Release date: August 19, 2005
- Running time: 85 minutes
- Country: United States
- Languages: English; Russian
- Budget: $26 million
- Box office: $96.2 million

Red Eye is a 2005 American psychological thriller film directed by Wes Craven and written by Carl Ellsworth, based on a story by Ellsworth and Dan Foos. It stars Rachel McAdams, Cillian Murphy, and Brian Cox. The story follows a hotel manager ensnared in an assassination plot by a terrorist while aboard a red-eye flight to Miami.

The film score was composed and conducted by Marco Beltrami. It was distributed by DreamWorks Pictures and released on August 19, 2005.

The film received positive reviews and has since been retrospectively regarded by many as one of Wes Craven's best films. An extended version of the film, which added previously unused footage to increase the running time, was broadcast on the ABC television network several times.

== Plot ==
After attending her grandmother's funeral in Texas, Lisa Reisert arrives at the airport to take a red-eye flight back to Miami, Florida. She meets a handsome young man named Jackson Rippner, also traveling to Miami. While waiting to board her flight, they share a drink at the airport bar and engage in small talk.

To Lisa's surprise, Jackson is seated next to her on the flight. After takeoff, Jack's charming demeanor quickly turns sinister as he informs Lisa that he works for a domestic terrorist organization planning to assassinate Charles Keefe, the current United States Deputy Secretary of Homeland Security. Lisa's managerial position at the Lux Atlantic Hotel in Miami, where Keefe and his family are staying, is crucial to their plot.

Jackson orders Lisa to call the hotel and move the Keefe family from their regular suite to one where a missile launched from a boat in the harbor will strike. Otherwise, her father, Joe, will be killed. Lisa makes several attempts to delay making the call and get help, going as far as writing a fake bomb threat in the bathroom. However, all her efforts are caught.

Eventually, Lisa calls her co-worker, Cynthia and has the Keefe family moved to the targeted suite. Jackson refuses to call off the hitman waiting outside Joe's house until the assassination is confirmed.

As the plane lands at Miami International Airport, Lisa reveals that two years earlier she was attacked and raped at knife point; she vowed never to be taken advantage of again. She stabs Jackson in the throat with a ballpoint pen, grabs his phone, and flees the plane.

Once outside, Lisa, chased by Jackson, exits the airport and steals an unattended SUV. She calls Cynthia and says to evacuate the hotel. Cynthia, the Keefes, and U.S. Secret Service agents vacate the suite seconds before a missile destroys it and damages the hotel's upper floors.

The cell phone's battery dies as Lisa calls her father, so she rushes to his house. She hits and kills the hitman with the car as he shoots at her, crashing into the front door. Joe is unharmed and has called 9-1-1.

Jackson arrives and incapacitates Joe, then pursues Lisa throughout the house. As they struggle, he throws her down the staircase. Lisa retrieves the dead hitman's gun and shoots Jackson. Though wounded, he disarms Lisa and is about to kill her when Joe revives, finds the gun, and shoots Jackson. Lisa returns to the hotel to provide assistance. Keefe praises her and Cynthia for saving him and his family.

== Cast ==
- Rachel McAdams as Lisa Reisert
- Cillian Murphy as Jackson Rippner
- Brian Cox as Joe Reisert, Lisa's father
- Jayma Mays as Cynthia, Lisa's friend and co-worker
- Jack Scalia as Charles Keefe, the United States Deputy Secretary of Homeland Security
- Robert Pine as Bob Taylor
- Teresa Press-Marx as Marianne Taylor
- Angela Paton as nice lady
- Suzie Plakson as senior flight attendant
- Monica McSwain as junior flight attendant
- Dane Farwell as hitman at dad's house
- Laura Johnson as blonde Woman
- Loren Lester as doctor
- Max Kasch as headphone kid
- Kyle Gallner as headphone kid's brother
- Brittany Oaks as Rebecca
- Beth Toussaint as Lydia Keefe
- Colby Donaldson as Keefe's head bodyguard
- Marc Macaulay as Coast Guard officer
- Jenny Wade as coffee shop girl

== Production ==
In March 2004, it was announced DreamWorks Pictures had purchased Red Eye, a script written by Carl Ellsworth described by trades as Phone Booth on a plane. In August of that year, it was announced Wes Craven had signed on to direct Red Eye. Rachel McAdams and Cillian Murphy were cast as the film's leads that September, with Craven noting Murphy's enthusiasm for the role as he flew in for a meeting two days before his wedding.

== Reception ==
=== Box office ===
Red Eye opened theatrically on August 19, 2005, in 3,079 venues, earning $16,167,662 in its opening weekend, ranking second in the domestic box office behind The 40-Year-Old Virgin ($21,422,815). At the end of its run, eight weeks later (on October 13), the film grossed $57,891,803 in the United States and Canada, and $37,685,971 overseas for a worldwide total of $95,577,774. The film had a $26 million budget.

=== Critical response ===
On Rotten Tomatoes, Red Eye holds an approval rating of 80%, with an average score of 6.7/10 based on 194 reviews. The website's critical consensus reads, "With solid performances and tight direction from Wes Craven, Red Eye is a brisk, economic thriller." On Metacritic, the film received a weighted score of 71 out of 100, based on 36 reviews, indicating "generally favorable reviews". Audiences polled by CinemaScore gave the film an average grade of B on an A+ to F scale.

Peter Travers of Rolling Stone gave the film 3.5/4 stars calling it the "best thriller of summer 2005", and a "gripping suspense [that] will pin you to your seat".

Roger Ebert commended the film, calling it a "good thriller" that moves "competently [and] relentlessly". He praised Craven for making the film "function so smoothly" and "doing exactly what it was intended to do". Ebert also expressed admiration for the performances of McAdams and Murphy, stating that they are "very effective together". He said that McAdams is "so convincing because she keeps [her performance] at ground level" and "she remains plausible even when the action ratchets up around her". He complimented Murphy for his "ability to modulate his character instead of gnashing the scenery". He gave the film 3/4 stars.

Manohla Dargis of The New York Times called the film a "nifty, tense thriller" and said that the casting of the two leads is "a nice surprise". She said that Murphy is "a picture-perfect villain" and McAdams has a "depth of intensity" that is uncommon.

USA Today film critic Claudia Puig said the film is "fun to watch because of the strong performances". She praised McAdams for blending "vulnerability and courage" into her performance and called Murphy "menacing". While she mentioned that the film is "tense, smart, and nerve-wracking" and "entertaining and scary" on the first hour, she criticizes the film for going "downhill" and becoming a "by-the-book action flick".

Variety's Robert Koehler stated that "Red Eye relies on hoodwinking an audience with its tension, so that the sheer illogic of the conspiracy plot can slip by without detection" but complimented McAdams for finding "new and interesting ways of silently projecting fear".

Wesley Morris of The Boston Globe felt the film was like a "poor cousin of an episode of 24. Call it 12."

In October 2006, the film ranked 25th in the 30 Even Scarier Movie Moments, a follow-up to Bravo's The 100 Scariest Movie Moments, which was aired in October 2004.

In 2021, Cillian Murphy said, "I remember when I saw it, [I] was like 'Oh, that's kind of a schlocky B movie. Rachel McAdams is excellent in it.' But I didn't think I gave a very nuanced performance in it. But, listen, if people love the movie then that's great. I'm pleased with that." In 2024, he recalled that Red Eye is not among his favorites: "I love Rachel McAdams and we had fun making it but I don't think it's a good movie. It's a good B movie."

=== Accolades ===
Awards
Award	Category	Name	Result
Golden Trailer Awards	Best Thriller		Nominated
Irish Film and Television Awards	Best Actor in a Feature Film	Cillian Murphy	Nominated
MTV Movie Awards	Best Performance	Rachel McAdams	Nominated
Saturn Awards	Best Action/Adventure/Thriller Film		Nominated
Saturn Awards	Best Actress	Rachel McAdams	Nominated
Saturn Awards	Best Supporting Actor	Cillian Murphy	Nominated
Teen Choice Awards	Choice Thriller		Won
Teen Choice Awards	Choice Scream	Rachel McAdams	Nominated
Teen Choice Awards	Choice Villain	Cillian Murphy	Nominated

== See also ==
- Flightplan, another 2005 psychological thriller taking place during a flight
