= Splat Pack =

Collection of filmmakers

The Splat Pack is a group of independent filmmakers who, since 2002, have directed, written and produced horror films which are notable for their low budgets and extreme violence.

== History ==
The term was coined by Alan Jones of Total Film. The group has been credited with bringing back ultra-violent movies, moving away from PG-13 rated movies and into the R-rated spectrum, all while operating with low budgets. The members have met opposition from the MPAA board over the content of their work, but nevertheless continue to find box-office success.

== Film ==
In 2010, a documentary film on the Splat Pack was made featuring interviews with members Alexandre Aja, Adam Green, Eli Roth, Darren Lynn Bousman, Neil Marshall, and Greg McLean.

== Members ==
- Alexandre Aja
- Darren Lynn Bousman
- Adam Green
- Neil Marshall
- Greg McLean
- Eli Roth
- Robert Rodriguez
- James Wan
- Leigh Whannell
- Rob Zombie

== Filmography ==
Year	Film	Director	Writer(s)	Producer(s)	Distributor(s)
2002	Dog Soldiers	Neil Marshall	Neil Marshall	Brian Patrick O'Toole, Christopher Figg, Tom Reeve, David E. Allen	Pathé
2002	Cabin Fever	Eli Roth	Eli Roth, Randy Pearlstein	Evan Astrowsky, Sam Froelich, Lauren Moews, Eli Roth	Lionsgate
2003	House of 1000 Corpses	Rob Zombie	Rob Zombie	Andy Gould	Lionsgate
2003	High Tension	Alexandre Aja	Alexandre Aja, Grégory Levasseur	Alexandre Arcady and Robert Benmussa	Lionsgate
2004	Saw	James Wan	Leigh Whannell	Gregg Hoffman, Mark Burg, Oren Koules,	Lionsgate
2005	The Devil's Rejects	Rob Zombie	Rob Zombie	Mike Elliott, Andy Gould, Marco Mehlitz, Michael Ohoven, Rob Zombie	Lionsgate
2005	The Descent	Neil Marshall	Neil Marshall	Christian Colson	Pathé
2005	Hostel	Eli Roth	Eli Roth	Scott Spiegel, Mike Fleiss, Quentin Tarantino, Eli Roth	Lionsgate
2005	Wolf Creek	Greg McLean	Greg McLean	George Adams, Martin Fabinyi, Michael Gudinski, Gary Hamilton, Matt Hearn, David Lightfoot	Dimension Films
2005	Saw II	Darren Lynn Bousman	Darren Lynn Bousman, Leigh Whannell	Gregg Hoffman, Mark Burg, Oren Koules, James Wan, Leigh Whannell	Lionsgate
2006	The Hills Have Eyes	Alexandre Aja	Alexandre Aja, Grégory Levasseur	Wes Craven, Peter Locke, Marianne Maddalena, Cody Zwieg	Fox Searchlight Pictures
2006	Saw III	Darren Lynn Bousman	Leigh Whannell	Gregg Hoffman, Mark Burg, Oren Koules,	Lionsgate
2007	Dead Silence	James Wan	Leigh Whannell	Gregg Hoffman, Mark Burg, Oren Koules	Universal Studios
2007	Death Sentence	James Wan	Ian Mackenzie Jeffers	Ashok Amritraj, Howard Baldwin, Karen Elise Baldwin	Fox Atomic
2007	Halloween	Rob Zombie	Rob Zombie	Malek Akkad, Patrick Esposito, Andy Gould, Andrew G. La Marca, Matthew Stein, and Rob Zombie	MGM Studios
2007	Hostel: Part II	Eli Roth	Eli Roth	Scott Spiegel, Quentin Tarantino, Boaz Yakin	Lionsgate
2007	Rogue	Greg McLean	Greg McLean, Aaron Sterns	Matt Hearn, David Lightfoot, Greg McLean	Dimension Films
2007	Planet Terror	Robert Rodriguez	Robert Rodriguez	Robert Rodriguez, Quentin Tarantino, Elizabeth Avellan	Dimension Films
2007	Saw IV	Darren Lynn Bousman	Patrick Melton, Marcus Dunstan	Gregg Hoffman, Mark Burg, Oren Koules,	Lionsgate
2008	Doomsday	Neil Marshall	Neil Marshall	Benedict Carver, Steven Paul	Rogue Pictures
2008	Mirrors	Alexandre Aja	Alexandre Aja, Grégory Levasseur	Alexandre Aja, Grégory Levasseur, Marc Sternberg, Alexandra Milchan	Twentieth Century Fox France
2008	Repo! The Genetic Opera	Darren Lynn Bousman	Terrance Zdunich, Darren Smith	Mark Burg, Oren Koules, Carl Mazzocone, Darren Lynn Bousman, Peter Block. Jason Constantine, Yoshiki	Lionsgate
2009	Halloween II	Rob Zombie	Rob Zombie	Malek Akkad, Andy Gould, and Rob Zombie	The Weinstein Company
2010	Piranha 3-D	Alexandre Aja	Pete Goldfinger, Josh Stolberg	Alexandre Aja, Mark Canton, Grégory Levasseur, and Marc Toberoff	The Weinstein Company
2010	Machete	Robert Rodriguez	Robert Rodriguez, Álvaro Rodriguez	Robert Rodriguez, Elizabeth Avellan, Rick Schwartz	20th Century Fox
2010	Insidious	James Wan	Leigh Whannell	Jason Blum, Steven Schneider, Oren Peli	FilmDistrict
2010	Mother's Day	Darren Lynn Bousman	Scott Milam	Brett Ratner, Richard Saperstein, Jay Stern, and Brian Witten	Anchor Bay Films
2011	11-11-11	Darren Lynn Bousman	Darren Lynn Bousman	Loris Curci, Richard Heller, Wayne Allan Rice	Epic Pictures Group
2012	The Barrens	Darren Lynn Bousman	Darren Lynn Bousman	Darren Lynn Bousman, Richard Saperstein, Brian Witten	Anchor Bay Entertainment
2012	The Lords of Salem	Rob Zombie	Rob Zombie	Jason Blum, Andy Gould, Oren Peli, Steven Schneider, Rob Zombie	Anchor Bay Films
2013	The Conjuring	James Wan	Chad Hayes, Carey W. Hayes	Tony DeRosa-Grund, Peter Safran, Rob Cowan	Warner Bros. Pictures
2013	Insidious: Chapter 2	James Wan	Leigh Whannell	Jason Blum, Steven Schneider, Oren Peli	FilmDistrict
2013	Wolf Creek 2	Greg McLean	Greg McLean, Aaron Sterns	Helen Leake, Greg McLean, Steve Topic	Roadshow Films
2014	Horns	Alexandre Aja	Keith Bunin	Alexandre Aja, Riza Aziz, Joey McFarland, Cathy Schulman	Dimension Films, RADiUS-TWC
2015	Insidious: Chapter 3	Leigh Whannell	Leigh Whannell	Jason Blum, Oren Peli, James Wan	Focus Features
2015	The Green Inferno	Eli Roth	Eli Roth, Guillermo Amoedo	Eli Roth, Miguel Asensio Llamas, Nicolas Lopez, Christopher Woodrow, Molly Conners	High Top Releasing, BH Tilt
2015	Knock Knock	Eli Roth	Eli Roth, Guillermo Amoedo, Nicolas Lopez	Miguel Asensio, Colleen Camp, John T. Degraye, Cassian Elwes, Nicolas Lopez, Eli Roth,	Lionsgate Premiere
2016	The Conjuring 2	James Wan	Chad Hayes, Carey W. Hayes, James Wan, David Leslie Johnson	Rob Cowan, Peter Safran, James Wan	Warner Bros. Pictures
2016	31	Rob Zombie	Rob Zombie	Rob Zombie, Andy Gould, Eddie Vaisman, Michael Sherman, Matthew Perniciario	Saban Films

== See also ==
- Vulgar auteurism
- Extreme cinema
- Video nasty
- Slasher film
- Exploitation film
- Torture porn
