= P2 (film) =

2007 film by Franck Khalfoun

- Theatrical release poster
- Directed by: Franck Khalfoun
- Screenplay by: Alexandre Aja; Franck Khalfoun; Grégory Levasseur
- Story by: Alexandre Aja; Grégory Levasseur
- Produced by: Alexandre Aja; Erik Feig; Grégory Levasseur; Patrick Wachsberger
- Starring: Wes Bentley; Rachel Nichols
- Cinematography: Maxime Alexandre
- Edited by: Patrick McMahon
- Music by: tomandandy
- Production companies: Summit Entertainment; Aja/Levasseur Productions
- Distributed by: Summit Distribution, LLC
- Release date: November 9, 2007
- Running time: 98 minutes
- Country: United States
- Language: English
- Budget: $3.5 million
- Box office: $7.7 million

P2 is a 2007 American psychological horror film directed by Franck Khalfoun, in his directorial debut, co-written by Khalfoun and producers Alexandre Aja and Grégory Levasseur, and starring Rachel Nichols and Wes Bentley. Its plot follows a young businesswoman who becomes trapped in an underground parking garage in midtown Manhattan on Christmas Eve, where she is pursued by a socially awkward, psychopathic security guard who is obsessed with her.

Following the release of their film High Tension (2003), Aja and his co-writer on that film, Levasseur, developed the screenplay for P2 alongside Khalfoun, inspired by a series of real-life attacks on women that were reported in Paris parking garages. Filming began in late-2006 in Toronto, with the majority of the shoot taking place in a real, operating parking garage.

P2 was released theatrically in the United States in November 2007, and was the first feature film distributed by Summit Entertainment. It received mixed reviews from critics and was a box-office failure domestically, averaging less than $1,000 per cinema during its opening weekend. Despite this, the film went on to gross $7.7 million internationally, becoming an eventual modest success.

== Plot ==
Young businesswoman Angela Bridges, who works in a Midtown Manhattan office block, is working late on Christmas Eve, before leaving to attend a family party. After reaching the second underground parking level (P2) beneath the office block, she discovers that her car will not start. After receiving assistance from Thomas Barclay, a socially awkward security guard, and turning down his offer to spend Christmas with him, she calls for a taxi and waits in the lobby. When the taxi arrives, she discovers she is locked in the lobby and runs back into the parking garage. The taxi leaves without her and the lights soon shut down. Angela, guided by the light on her cell phone, wanders around the deserted parking lot. Thomas, who is revealed to be psychotic, drugs her with chloroform.

Angela awakens in a haze inside Thomas' office, having been changed into a white dress and high-heels by Thomas and her foot chained to the table. Thomas tells Angela that he loves her, despite her "many sins", having obsessively watched and recorded her for some time through the CCTV in the office block. Thomas eventually forces Angela to call her family and lie about an illness so that no one will come looking for her. Angela tries to escape, but cannot due to Rocky, Thomas' Rottweiler, and is also confined to handcuffs by Thomas.

Taking Angela to another level of the parking lot, Thomas reveals her co-worker Jim Harper tied to an office chair. Thomas believes Jim is a terrible person after he witnessed him drunkenly grope Angela at an office party, and refuses to listen to or believe Angela's pleas that Jim apologised for his drunken action earlier. Thomas instructs Angela to get back at Jim by hitting him with a flashlight, but ultimately beats Jim himself, and then repeatedly rams him into the wall with his car, killing him. Amidst the murder, Angela escapes barefoot after ditching her high heels.

While Thomas hides the evidence, Angela hides and gets her handcuffed hands in front of her. She rushes back to Thomas' office to retrieve her phone, finding key cards and a spot near the locked gate that has reception, but after dialing 911, she drops her phone on the other side of the gate. She uses a key card to get to the elevators. While in the elevator, Angela calls for help from a nearby panel. She hears a voice that appears to be an operator but later turns out to be Thomas, who says that she will come around to love him back and flushes her out by flooding the elevator with a fire hose from a higher floor. Amidst the flooding, the body of security guard Karl Donson drops down and hits her.

While hiding in the parking lot, Angela is tormented by Thomas, who declares he has no intention of letting her leave the garage. She breaks open an emergency fire axe and begins to destroy the cameras while reaching his office, prepared to fight. On entering, she finds a video playing of Thomas molesting her body while she was drugged, enraging Angela. Thomas sneaks up behind her, knocks her out with a taser, and hides her in the trunk of a car, just as two police officers arrive in response to a reported disturbance. Angela wakes up and breaks out, but realises she is too late as she sees the police car drive off. Thomas releases Rocky, who chases Angela and bites her leg. She, however, kills it; enraged, Thomas continues pursuing Angela.

Angela finds keys in a car rental office and tries to escape by car, but is side-swiped by Thomas in another vehicle, leading to a game of chicken, which Angela wins, though in the heat of the chase, she flips the vehicle. Thomas opens the door and prepares to grab Angela, who feigns unconsciousness to get Thomas close to her, stabs him in the eye and chokes him with her handcuffs, while finally denouncing Thomas for his selfish actions. She takes his keys to free herself, cuffs him to the car just before he comes to, and begins to leave while taking his taser. A now-powerless Thomas desperately starts pleading with her, saying he is always alone and begging her to give him a chance, but when Angela does not respond to his pleas, he angrily insults her. In retaliation, Angela uses the taser to ignite a stream of gasoline leaking from the car while sarcastically wishing a now-horrified Thomas a merry Christmas, and walks away as a screaming Thomas is engulfed in the flames and the car explodes, killing him. Angela then opens the garage gate and limps out into a Manhattan Christmas morning just as the fire department, paramedics, and police are arriving.

== Cast ==
- Rachel Nichols as Angela Bridges
- Wes Bentley as Thomas Barclay
- Simon Reynolds as Jim Harper
- Philip Akin as Karl Donson
- Stephanie Moore as Lorraine Bridges
- Miranda Edwards as Jody McKlennan
- Paul Sun-Hyung Lee as Doug Tran Phu (Man in Elevator)
- Grace Lynn Kung as Kim Phu (Woman in Elevator)
- Bathsheba Garnett as Homeless Woman
- Philip Williams as Cop #1
- Arnold Pinnock as Cop #2
- Franck Khalfoun as Newsman

== Production ==
=== Development ===
After completing the horror film High Tension (2003), director Alexandre Aja and his co-writer, Grégory Levasseur, began developing a new screenplay based on a series of real-life attacks on women in parking garages in Paris. Aja and Levasseur approached their friend, Franck Khalfoun, who had appeared in a small role in High Tension, to collaborate on the project, and ultimately, direct it. According to Aja, when asked about the comparisons with High Tension, he said: "With a strong plot in the vein of High Tension, P2 gives us a chance to further explore the survival aspect of the terror movie."

=== Filming ===
P2 began principal photography on August 14, 2006, and continued filming through late 2006. Filming took place exclusively at night, at a real, working Toronto parking garage. There were fourteen white dresses made for the character of Angela to wear; each one was in various stages of dirtiness and decay. Three different dogs were used to portray Thomas' Rottweiler. Both Aja and Levasseur worked as second unit directors on the film.

Commenting on the shoot, actress Rachel Nichols recalled: "This was definitely the most demanding job I ever had... we shot for two months straight, working nights. I was in a dress with bare feet and they made these weird pads for the bottom of my feet. My arms are bare, my legs are bare, I’m wearing handcuffs for most of it – the handcuffs were real throughout, even when I’m driving the car. The bruises were unbelievable. As hostile and angry as I was... I think it actually really ended up helping make the whole thing real for me."

=== Music ===
The film's original score was written and performed by American musical duo tomandandy. Khalfoun commented on his decision to hire them for the project: "A lot of their stuff was electronic, though, and I wanted something very classical. The parking lot in itself was so urban that putting an urban soundtrack over it was overkill. We needed something more Bernard Herrmann-esque, we wanted something in that vein."

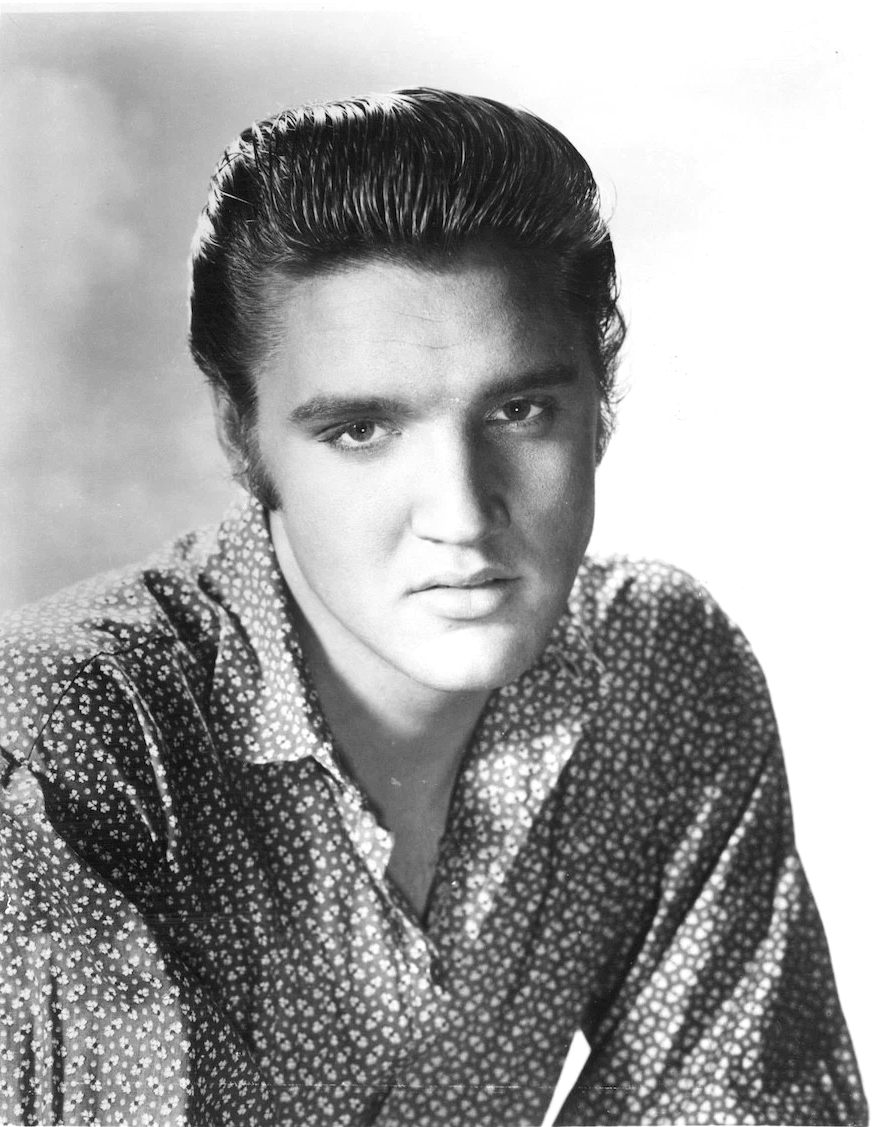
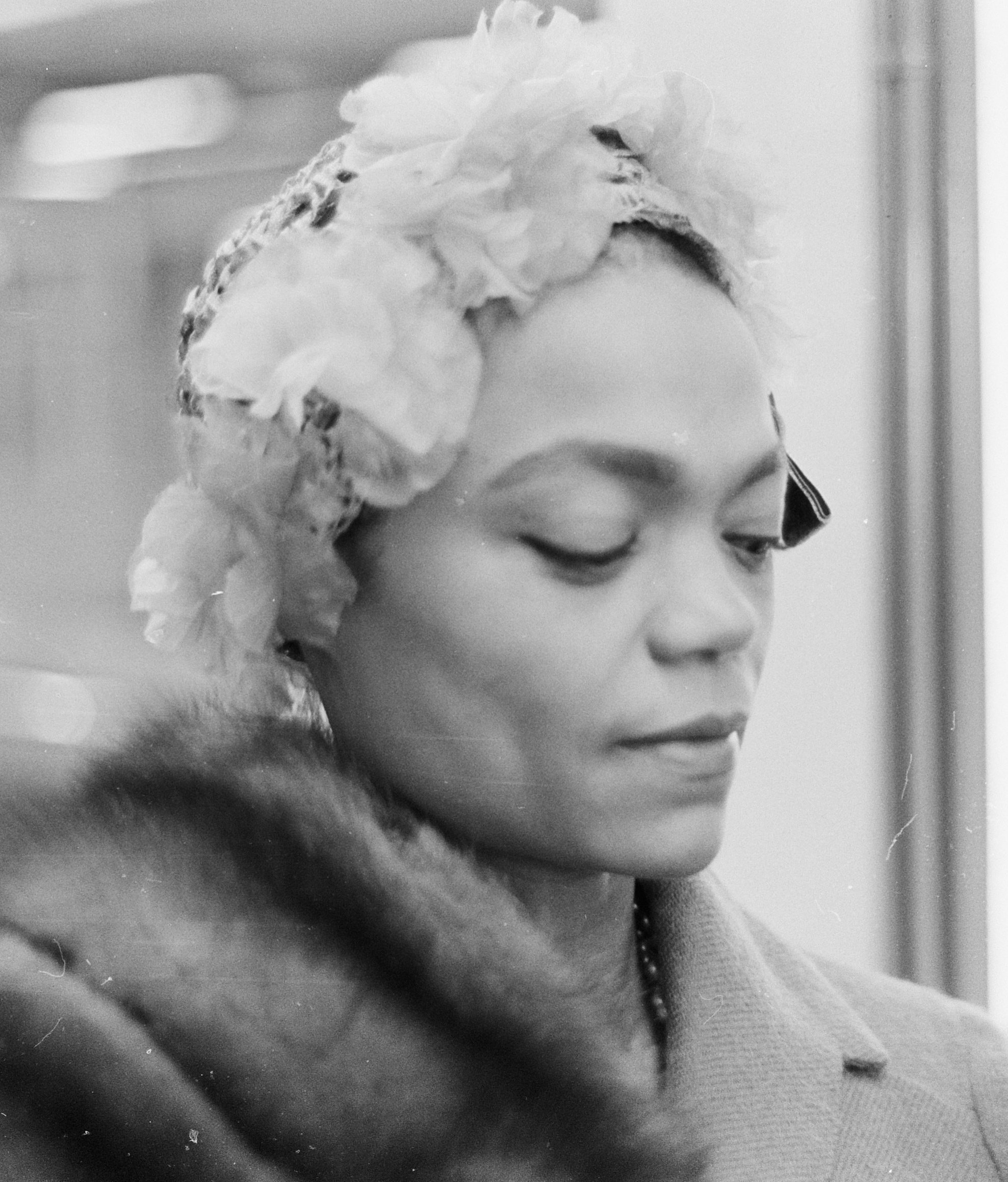
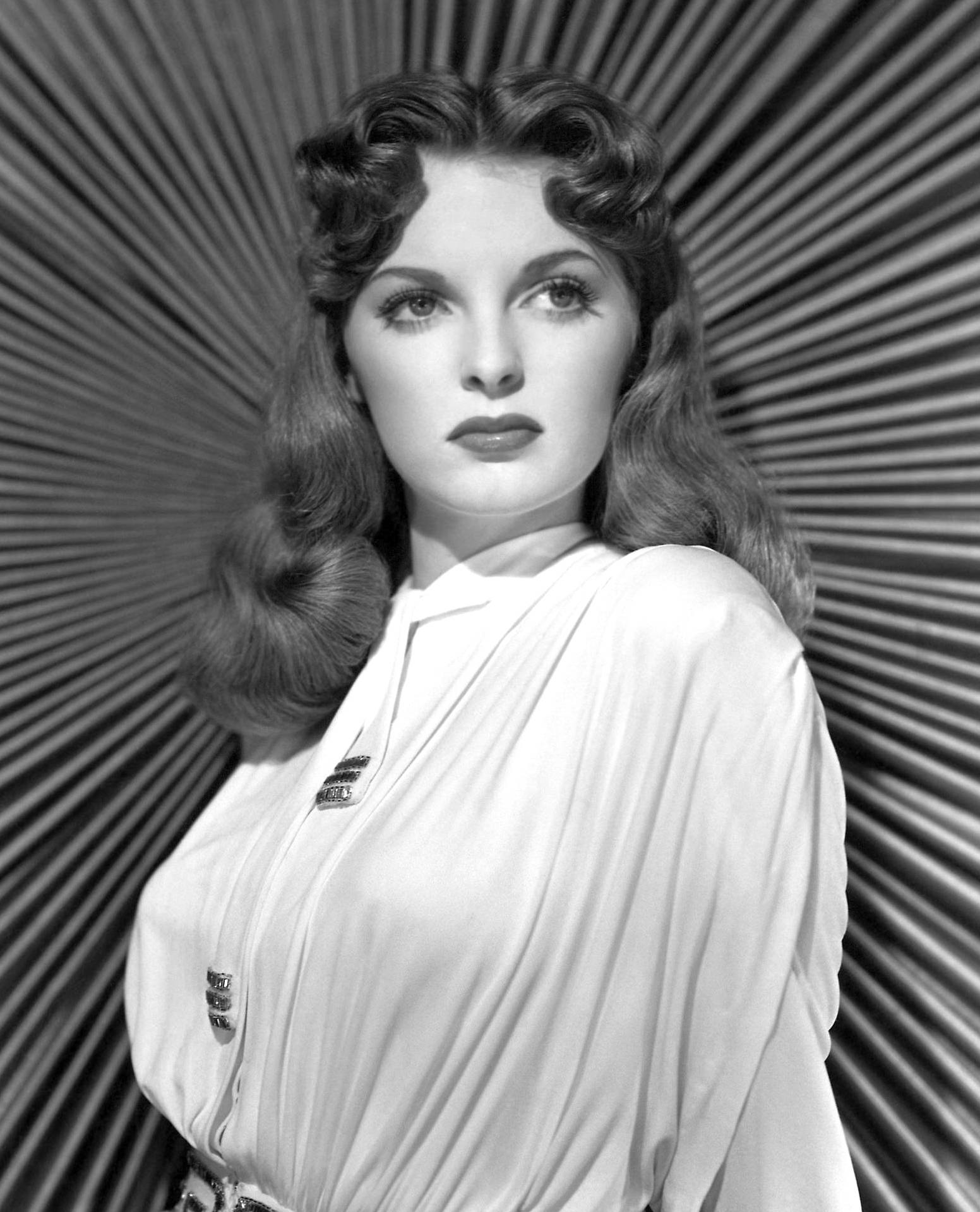
The film features retro Christmas songs by the artists Elvis Presley, Eartha Kitt, and Julie London, which figure prominently in several sequences

Though an official soundtrack was not released, the following songs are featured in the film: (Note: Adapted from the film's end credits sequence.)

- "Santa Baby" by Eartha Kitt
- "Blue Christmas" by Elvis Presley
- "Calm Down" by Mr. Complex
- "Living Funeral" by Dance Yourself to Death
- "I'd Like You For Christmas" by Julie London

Additionally, it features renditions of the following traditional Christmas songs:

- "Good King Wenceslas"
- "Silent Night"
- "Deck the Halls"

== Release ==
P2 was intended to be featured in the UK-based London FrightFest Film Festival in August 2007, but was pulled out soon before its date and replaced with Teeth. The film was distributed in the United States by Summit Entertainment, and marked the company's first feature film distribution.

=== Box office ===
P2 was released theatrically in the United States on November 9, 2007, in 2,131 theaters. The film was a box-office bomb, averaging only $977 per theater from November 9–11, 2007, making it—at the time—one of worst opening weekends for a film released on over 2,000 screens. The film's theatrical run continued in the United States through December 2007, concluding with a domestic gross of $3,995,018. It earned an additional $3,771,222 in foreign markets, making for a worldwide gross of $7,766,240.

=== Critical reception ===
On review aggregator Rotten Tomatoes, P2 holds an approval rating of 35% based on 69 reviews, with an average rating of 4.4/10. The website's critics consensus states: "P2 is full of gore, but low on suspense, featuring a cat-and-mouse plot has been done many times before." On Metacritic, the film has an average score of 37 out of 100 based on 15 critics, indicating "generally unfavorable reviews".

Robert Abele of the Los Angeles Times felt the film's screenplay was redolent of other horror films, describing it as a "dull story" that "quickly devolves to little more than a strained effort in trapping, terrorizing... and torture." Jeannette Catsoulis of The New York Times gave P2 a favorable review, though she likened it to an exploitation film, "bloody but not punishingly so, limiting the gore to tightly edited set pieces that never linger... Throw in a car that won’t start, a creepy security guard and a filmmaking team with perfect synchronicity, and the result is a minimalist nightmare." Roger Ebert gave the film a favorable three out of four stars, and stated in his review that "although the plot may seem like a formulaic slasher film, P2 is in fact a very well made, atmospheric thriller with gritty yet realistic characters."

=== Home media ===
P2 was released on DVD in the United States by Summit Home Entertainment in March 2008. The same year, the film was given a region 2 DVD and region B Blu-ray release in the United Kingdom.

== See also ==
- List of films set around Christmas
- Holiday horror
- I Love You, a 2023 Indian film inspired by P2
