= Maxime Alexandre =

Belgian Italian cinematographer (born 1971)

- Born: February 4, 1971; Ronse, East Flanders, Belgium
- Years active: 1991–present

Maxime Alexandre, ASC, CCS (February 4, 1971 in Ronse, East Flanders, Belgium) is a Belgian-Italian cinematographer known for horror productions, mainly with his collaborations with directors Alexandre Aja and David F. Sandberg.

== Early life ==
Born in Ronse, Belgium in 1971, Alexandre moved with his family to Rome when he was five. His stepfather, Inigo Lezzi (at the time assistant director for Marco Bellocchio, Gianni Amelio, and Nanni Moretti), guided him through discovering the Italian cinema greats. Alexandre soon worked as a young actor in several movies, including Une page d'amour, directed by Elie Chouraqui.

== Career ==
Alexandre discovered a passion for photography on the set of a short movie directed by his stepfather. In the late 1980s, his family moved to Paris. He began his career in the camera department working on commercials, learning from cinematographers like Darius Khondji, Jean-Yves Escoffier, Pierre Lhomme, Vilko Filac, Tonino Delli Colli, and Franco Di Giacomo.

His earliest work as a director of photography was shooting the second commercial unit for Michel Gondry.

In 2001, he met Alexandre Aja and Grégory Levasseur when he shot the second unit for Aja's father, Alexandre Arcady, on Break of Dawn. The three of them later collaborated on Aja's directorial debut, High Tension. The movie was internationally recognized as the beginning of the new wave of horror in French cinema and was picked up for distribution by Lionsgate.

In 2006, he was recognized by Variety as one of its Ten Cinematographers to Watch.

In 2008, he directed his first feature film, Holy Money. His second directorial feature, Christopher Roth, was selected for several festivals, including the Brussels International Fantastic Film Festival and the Rome Independent Film Festival.

He has been a member of the Italian Society of Cinematographers and American Society of Cinematographers since 2023.

== Filmography ==
=== Film ===
Year	Title	Director	Notes
2003	High Tension	Alexandre Aja	
2004	Mariage mixte	Alexandre Arcady	
2004	The Defender	Dolph Lundgren	
2005	Marock	Laïla Marrakchi	
2006	The Hills Have Eyes	Alexandre Aja	
2006	The Last Drop	Colin Teague	
2007	Catacombs	Tomm Coker; David Elliot	
2007	P2	Franck Khalfoun	
2008	Mirrors	Alexandre Aja	
2009	Holy Money	Himself	Also writer
2010	The Crazies	Breck Eisner	
2010	Christopher Roth	Himself	Also writer
2011	The End	Jorge Torregrossa	
2011	L'Amante du Rif	Narjiss Nejjar	
2012	Maniac	Franck Khalfoun	
2012	Silent Hill: Revelation 3D	M. J. Bassett	
2014	Earth to Echo	Dave Green	
2014	The Voices	Marjane Satrapi	
2015	Lady of Csejte	Andrei Konst	
2015	Grotto	Micol Pallucca	
2016	The Other Side of the Door	Johannes Roberts	
2016	The 9th Life of Louis Drax	Alexandre Aja	
2017	Annabelle: Creation	David F. Sandberg	
2018	The Nun	Corin Hardy	
2018	The Domestics	Mike P. Nelson	
2019	Shazam!	David F. Sandberg	
2019	Crawl	Alexandre Aja	
2019	Countdown	Justin Dec	
2020	Come Play	Jacob Chase	
2021	Oxygen	Alexandre Aja	
2021	Resident Evil: Welcome to Raccoon City	Johannes Roberts	
2023	The Cello	Darren Lynn Bousman	
2024	Role Play	Thomas Vincent	
2024	Never Let Go	Alexandre Aja	
2025	Until Dawn	David F. Sandberg	
2025	Frontier Crucible	Travis Mills	
2026	Above & Below	Jesse V. Johnson	
2026	Orphans	William Brent Bell	Post-production

=== Television ===
Year	Title	Director	Notes
2013	Air Force One Is Down	Cilla Ware	Miniseries
2016	The Wilding	Ciarán Foy	TV movie
2020	The Haunting of Bly Manor	Mike Flanagan; Ciarán Foy; Liam Gavin; E. L. Katz	6 episodes
2021	The Girl in the Woods	Krysten Ritter; Jacob Chase	8 episodes
2026	The Pendragon Cycle: Rise of the Merlin	Jesse V. Johnson; Jeremy Boreing	3 episodes
