= Bojan Bazelli =

Montenegrin cinematographer and music video director

- Born: 15 August 1957 (age 69); Herceg Novi, PR Montenegro, FPR Yugoslavia
- Education: Film and TV School of the Academy of Performing Arts in Prague
- Years active: 1987–present

Bojan Bazelli, ASC (born 15 August 1957) is a Montenegrin cinematographer and director of film, commercials, and music videos.

== Career ==
Impressed with one of his student films, director Abel Ferrara hired Bazelli to shoot China Girl in New York City. He subsequently filmed King of New York and Body Snatchers as well.

Bazelli was honored for Best Cinematography in both 1996 and 1998 at the American Independent Commercial Producers (AICP), one of the few cinematographers to have received this honor twice.

== Filmography ==
Film

Year	Title	Director	Notes
1987	China Girl	Abel Ferrara	
1988	Tapeheads	Bill Fishman	
1988	Patty Hearst	Paul Schrader	Also camera operator
1988	Pumpkinhead	Stan Winston	Also camera operator
1989	Big Man on Campus	Jeremy Kagan	Also camera operator
1990	King of New York	Abel Ferrara	Also camera operator
1990	A Gnome Named Gnorm	Stan Winston	Also camera operator
1991	The Rapture	Michael Tolkin	
1992	Deep Cover	Bill Duke	
1993	Boxing Helena	Jennifer Lynch	With Frank Byers
1993	Kalifornia	Dominic Sena	
1993	Body Snatchers	Abel Ferrara	
1994	Sugar Hill	Leon Ichaso	
1994	Surviving the Game	Ernest Dickerson	
1998	Dangerous Beauty	Marshall Herskovitz	
2002	The Ring	Gore Verbinski	
2005	Mr. & Mrs. Smith	Doug Liman	
2007	Hairspray	Adam Shankman	
2009	G-Force	Hoyt Yeatman	
2010	The Sorcerer's Apprentice	Jon Turteltaub	
2010	Burlesque	Steve Antin	
2012	Rock of Ages	Adam Shankman	
2013	The Lone Ranger	Gore Verbinski	
2016	Pete's Dragon	David Lowery	
2016	A Cure for Wellness	Gore Verbinski	
2016	Spectral	Nic Mathieu	
2019	6 Underground	Michael Bay	
2020	Underwater	William Eubank	
2021	Snake Eyes	Robert Schwentke	
2023	Murder Mystery 2	Jeremy Garelick	
2023	Peter Pan & Wendy	David Lowery	
2027	Crawl 2	Alexandre Aja	

TV movies

Year	Title	Director	Notes
1989	The Comeback	Jerrold Freedman	With William F. Carlson
1989	The Haunting of Sarah Hardy	Jerry London	
1990	Curiosity Kills	Colin Bucksey	
1990	Somebody Has to Shoot the Picture	Frank Pierson	
1991	Fever	Larry Elikann	
1991	The Last Prostitute	Lou Antonio	
1992	The Fear Inside	Leon Ichaso	
2019	L.A. Confidential	Michael Dinner	Unsold pilot

== Awards and nominations ==
Year	Award	Category	Title	Result
1990	Independent Spirit Awards	Best Cinematography	King of New York	Nominated
1993	Montreal World Film Festival	Jury Award for Best Cinematography	Kalifornia	Won
2016	Fright Meter Awards	Best Cinematography	A Cure for Wellness	Won
