= Crawl 2 =

Upcoming film by Alexandre Aja

- Directed by: Alexandre Aja
- Written by: Jason Harry Pagan; Andrew Deutschman; Alexandre Aja; Gregory Levasseur
- Produced by: Craig Flores; Sam Raimi; Alexandre Aja
- Starring: Mason Gooding; Emily Rudd
- Cinematography: Bojan Bazelli
- Production companies: Raimi Productions; Fire Axe Pictures
- Distributed by: Paramount Pictures
- Release date: July 16, 2027
- Country: United States
- Language: English

Crawl 2 is an upcoming American natural horror film directed by Alexandre Aja. A sequel to Aja's 2019 film Crawl, it stars Mason Gooding, Emily Rudd, Sarah Niles, Ray Panthaki, Richard Brake, Charley Palmer Rothwell, and Flula Borg. The film is set to be released in the United States by Paramount Pictures on July 16, 2027.

== Premise ==
Alligators make their way onto the streets and sewers of New York City after a hurricane.

== Cast ==
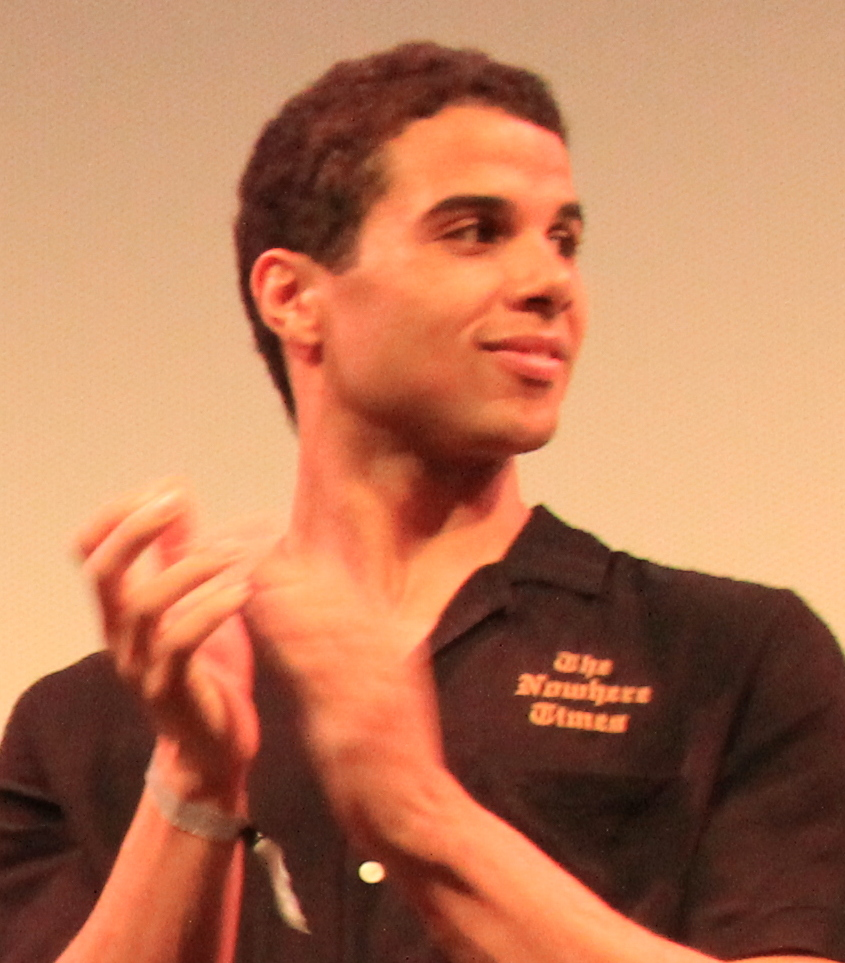
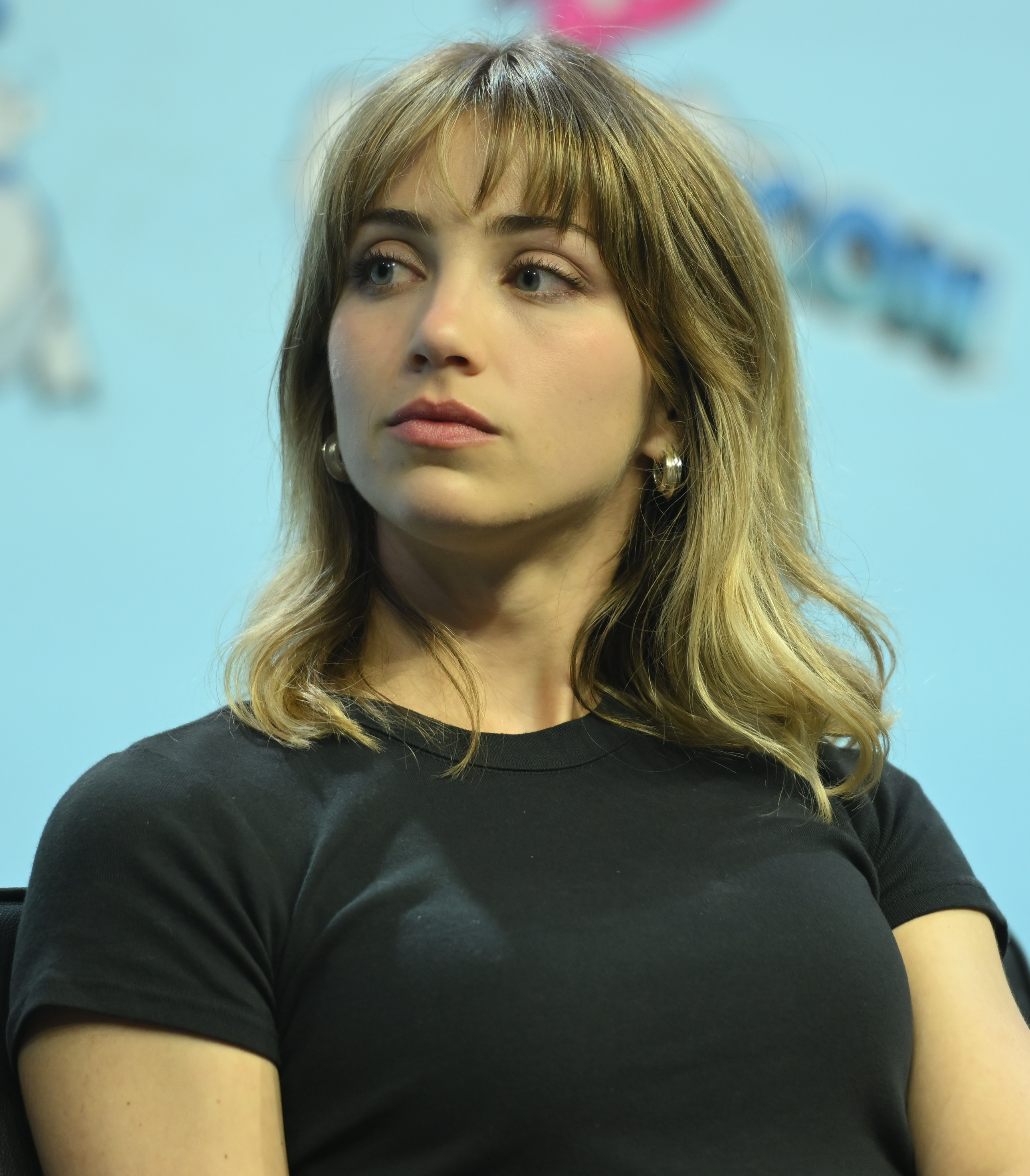
Mason Gooding and Emily Rudd star in the film.
- Mason Gooding
- Emily Rudd
- Sarah Niles
- Ray Panthaki
- Richard Brake
- Charley Palmer Rothwell
- Flula Borg

== Production ==
During the press run for his 2019 film Crawl, director Alexandre Aja welcomed the idea of a sequel that focused on different characters in a new story. Following the film's positive reception, Aja said he was "sure the question of a sequel [was] going to come up", and mentioned the development of "a few stories" for a future installment. In April 2021, Aja revealed a screenplay was being written. In August 2024, Paramount Pictures officially greenlit a sequel.

Jason Harry Pagan and Andrew Deutschman wrote the script, having previously collaborated on Project Almanac and Paranormal Activity: The Ghost Dimension (both 2015). In January 2025, it was reported that filming would take place in Budapest, Hungary, and Belgrade, Serbia, and that the plot would follow the resulting chaos as animals escape from New York's Central Park Zoo during a storm. In September, Crawl actress Kaya Scodelario confirmed she would not return for the sequel.

In February 2026, after a production hiatus, producer Sam Raimi said Paramount "changed hands" during the film's development, but "the new group that's come in I've worked with before... and they're interested in Crawl 2." In August 2026, Mason Gooding and Emily Rudd joined the cast; the two actors previously starred together in Moonshot (2022). Filming began in Budapest, Hungary, on August 21, 2026, with cinematographer Bojan Bazelli. Additional cast members were announced in October.

== Release ==
Crawl 2 is scheduled to be released in the United States on July 16, 2027.
