= Never Let Go (2024 film) =

Film by Alexandre Aja

- Theatrical release poster
- Directed by: Alexandre Aja
- Written by: KC Coughlin; Ryan Grassby
- Produced by: Shawn Levy; Dan Cohen; Thiago Andreo Barbosa Nogueira; Dan Levine; Alexandre Aja
- Starring: Halle Berry; Percy Daggs IV; Anthony B. Jenkins
- Cinematography: Maxime Alexandre
- Edited by: Elliot Greenberg
- Music by: Robin Coudert
- Production companies: 21 Laps Entertainment; HalleHolly
- Distributed by: Lionsgate (through Summit Entertainment)
- Release dates: September 16, 2024 (Regal Times Square); September 20, 2024 (United States)
- Running time: 101 minutes
- Country: United States
- Language: English
- Budget: $20 million
- Box office: $21.8 million

Never Let Go is a 2024 American survival horror film directed by Alexandre Aja. The film stars Halle Berry, Percy Daggs IV, and Anthony B. Jenkins. The film follows a mother and her twin sons living in isolation in a remote cabin.

Never Let Go premiered at the Regal Times Square in New York City on September 16, 2024, and was released in the United States by Lionsgate on September 20, 2024.

== Plot ==
Momma and her two young children, Nolan and Sam, live in a cabin in a large forest. According to Momma, a supernatural force known as "The Evil" has spread across the world, leaving them the only survivors.

Momma is besieged by visions of supernatural entities that her sons cannot see but believe are real. The family spends their days foraging and hunting for food. To prevent the Evil from touching them, which Momma says ensures possession, the family must have ropes tied when they leave the house, connecting them back to the building. The boys must also chant a daily prayer to the house in thanks for it keeping them safe from the Evil.

While out foraging one day, Sam and Nolan get into an argument about Momma's behavior. Nolan becomes upset when he seemingly overhears Sam say, "She loves me more". Sam denies saying such words. Nolan intentionally steps on Sam's rope, causing Sam to fall, get disconnected from his rope, and break his ankle. Nolan unties himself to try and rescue Sam. The boys are rescued by Momma, who encounters the Evil in the shape of her mother. As Sam recovers from his fall, Nolan, who has started to doubt his mother's claims, questions him on what he saw but Sam dismisses his suspicions.

A brutal winter forces the family to use up a large amount of their stockpiled food, while preventing them from growing or hunting new food. Meanwhile, Momma's visions intensify, including the boys' father and her husband, whom she killed, along with her own mother and father as well as that of a mutilated Nolan. Sensing discontent from her sons, Momma tells them about her old life in the city and shows them an old Polaroid camera with one photo left.

Now fully out of food and forced to eat tree bark, Momma states that they need to kill and eat the family dog Koda. Nolan protests, stating you should not kill family, but Sam stands with Momma. When Momma takes Koda into the greenhouse to kill him, Nolan cuts her rope and locks her inside, hoping she will see the Evil is not real. As Koda runs away, Momma, encountering the Evil in her mother's form, kills herself, while Nolan prevents Sam from entering, distracting them both. When they find Momma dead, Nolan ties a rope to himself again. Sam blames Nolan for causing Momma's death, which Nolan feels guilty for, vowing to protect Sam from starving. As they continue to starve alone, Sam's behavior becomes more erratic and threatening.

Using the extra free rope from his mother, Nolan ventures further out and finds an empty road. Returning to the house, he encounters Cole, a hiker who has heard his calls for help. As Cole grows increasingly concerned over Nolan's story and living conditions, Sam confronts him with a crossbow. Although Nolan and Cole try to de-escalate the situation, Sam shoots Cole. Nolan follows the wounded Cole as he calls 911 and dies, then retrieves his backpack filled with food. That night, a young girl, claiming to be Cole's daughter, arrives at the house and confronts Sam. Noticing that Sam has her father's flashlight, she flees as he chases after her, shouting that it was an accident. When Sam unties himself to reach her, the girl reveals herself to be the Evil and manages to touch Sam.

Back at the house, Sam, now seemingly possessed and exhibiting erratic behavior, tries to kill Nolan. Sam sets the house on fire as Nolan is confronted by the Evil in the form of Momma. Nolan pushes Momma into a small crawlspace in the house that gives shelter to the pair of them from the fire. The Evil sheds Momma's skin to reveal a scaled creature that dissipates as the two hug each other. The fire burns the house down and Sam takes the last photo with the Polaroid. Paramedics arrive and retrieve Nolan from the remains of the house. As he is flown away, Koda running after them on the street below, Nolan asks where Sam is and sees that he too has been rescued. The helicopter reaches civilization, revealing that Momma had been lying about the rest of the world. Sam quietly whispers to Nolan, "She loves me more", as the Polaroid he took is shown, revealing a scaled hand on his shoulder. “The evil” being revealed to be an allegory for mental illness seemingly passed down from mother to son.

== Cast ==
- Halle Berry as June / Momma, the twin's mother.
- Percy Daggs IV as Nolan, Momma's son and Sam's twin brother
- Anthony B. Jenkins as Samuel / Sam, Momma's son and Nolan's twin brother
- Will Catlett as Poppa, the twin's deceased father
- Matthew Kevin Anderson as Cole, a hiker
- Christin Park as a medic
- Stephanie Lavigne as the Evil

== Production ==
In August 2020, KC Coughlin and Ryan Grassby's horror script Mother Land was acquired by Shawn Levy's company 21 Laps Entertainment with Lionsgate Films set to distribute. In April 2021, Mark Romanek was hired to direct the film. In May 2022, it was announced that Romanek left the project and Alexandre Aja was set to direct with Halle Berry joining the cast. The following month, Lionsgate sold the international rights to multiple companies during the Cannes Film Festival. In April 2023, Percy Daggs IV and Anthony B. Jenkins joined the cast of the film, which had been retitled Never Let Go. In May 2024, it was revealed that Matthew Kevin Anderson, Christin Park, and Stephanie Lavigne were added to the cast. Principal photography took place in Vancouver, British Columbia from April 17 to June 2, 2023. Robin "Rob" Coudert composed the film's score. Media Capital Technologies co-financed the film.

== Release ==
The world premiere of Never Let Go was held at the Regal Times Square theater in New York City on September 16, 2024. It was shown as a gala screening on the opening night of Fantastic Fest on September 19, 2024, and was released theatrically in the United States the next day.

== Reception ==
=== Box office ===
As of October 15, 2024, Never Let Go has grossed $10.3 million in the United States and Canada, and $11.5 million in other territories, for a worldwide total of $21.8 million.

In the United States and Canada, Never Let Go was released alongside The Substance and Transformers One, and was projected to gross $4–7 million from 2,667 theaters in its opening weekend. The film made $1.6 million on its first day, including $360,000 from Thursday night previews. It went on to debut to $4.5 million, finishing in fourth.

=== Critical response ===
On the review aggregator website Rotten Tomatoes, 56% of 105 critics' reviews are positive, with an average rating of 5.9/10. The website's consensus reads: "Director Alexandre Aja's latest horror offering boasts anxiety-inducing atmosphere and a committed performance from Halle Berry, although audiences will have to let go of some storytelling expectations to enjoy the ride." Metacritic, which uses a weighted average, assigned the film a score of 55 out of 100, based on 21 critics, indicating "mixed or average" reviews. Audiences polled by CinemaScore gave the film an average grade of "C+" on an A+ to F scale, while those surveyed by PostTrak gave it a 67% overall positive score.

== Potential future ==
In September 2024, Berry confirmed the studio's plans to develop the film into a horror franchise. The actress expressed interest in the idea, while confirming that stories for a prequel and sequels had been written.
