= Piranha 3D =

2010 film by Alexandre Aja

- Theatrical release poster
- Directed by: Alexandre Aja
- Written by: Pete Goldfinger; Josh Stolberg
- Based on: Piranha; 1978 film by John Sayles
- Produced by: Alexandre Aja; Mark Canton; Marc Toberoff; Grégory Levasseur
- Starring: Elisabeth Shue; Adam Scott; Jerry O'Connell; Ving Rhames; Jessica Szohr; Steven R. McQueen; Christopher Lloyd; Richard Dreyfuss
- Cinematography: John R. Leonetti
- Edited by: James Baxter
- Music by: Michael Wandmacher
- Production companies: Dimension Films; Atmosphere Entertainment; Chako Film Company; Intellectual Properties Worldwide
- Distributed by: The Weinstein Company
- Release date: August 20, 2010
- Running time: 88 minutes
- Country: United States
- Language: English
- Budget: $24 million
- Box office: $83.1 million

Piranha 3D is a 2010 American 3D action horror black comedy film that serves as a remake of the 1978 film and the fourth installment in the Piranha film series. Directed by Alexandre Aja and written by Pete Goldfinger and Josh Stolberg, the film stars Elisabeth Shue, Adam Scott, Jerry O'Connell, Ving Rhames, Jessica Szohr, Steven R. McQueen, Christopher Lloyd, Kelly Brook and Richard Dreyfuss. During spring break on Lake Victoria, a popular waterside resort, an underground tremor releases hundreds of prehistoric, carnivorous piranhas into the lake. Local cop Julie Forester (Elisabeth Shue) must join forces with a band of unlikely strangers—though they are badly outnumbered—to destroy the ravenous creatures before everyone becomes fish food.

The film was theatrically released in the United States on August 20, 2010, by The Weinstein Company. It received generally positive reviews from critics and was a box office success, grossing over $83.1 million worldwide against a $24 million budget. A sequel, Piranha 3DD, released in 2012, was a critical and commercial failure.

== Plot ==
Local fisherman Matt Boyd is fishing in Lake Victoria, Arizona when a small earthquake hits, splitting the lake floor and causing a whirlpool. Matt falls in and is eaten by a school of prehistoric piranhas that emerge from the chasm.

As spring break begins, college student Jake Forester reunites with his old crush Kelly and meets her arrogant boyfriend Todd Dupree. Jake meets Derrick Jones, a sleazy pornographer as well as Danni, one of his actresses. Derrick convinces Jake to show him good spots on the lake for filming a pornographic movie. Jake's mother, Sheriff Julie Forester, searches for the missing Matt Boyd with Deputy Fallon. They find his mutilated corpse and contemplate closing the lake, but this is complicated by thousands of partying college students on spring break, which is important for bringing revenue to the small town. The next morning, a lone cliff diver is attacked and devoured by the piranhas.

Jake's siblings, Zane and Laura, take a canoe to go fishing on a small sandbar island and become stranded in the middle of the lake due to Zane neglecting to properly secure the canoe. Jake runs into Kelly, who accepted Derrick's invitation on board his boat, and meets Derrick's other actress Crystal and his cameraman Andrew.

Julie takes a team of seismologist divers: Novak, Sam, and Paula to the fissure. Novak speculates that the rift leads to a buried prehistoric lake. Paula and Sam scuba dive to the bottom and discover a big cavern filled with large piranha egg stocks. Both are eaten by the piranhas before they can alert the others. Novak and Julie find Paula's corpse and pull it onto the boat, capturing a lone piranha, which they take to Carl Goodman, a retired marine biologist who owns a fish pet store with his wife. He explains that the piranha is a super-aggressive prehistoric species known as Pygocentrus nattereri, or the Original Piranha, previously believed to have been extinct for over two million years, and theorizes that they must have survived through cannibalism. The species is able to vigorously devour its prey in seconds.

Julie, Novak, Fallon, and Deputy Taylor Roberts try to evacuate the lake, but their warnings are ignored. The piranhas begin to attack the tourists, turning the party into a bloodbath. Novak boards a jet-ski with a shotgun to help while the rest of the team try to save the others. Almost everyone in the lake is either grievously wounded or killed by the piranhas, including Todd, whose boat capsizes as he attempts to escape. Fallon makes a last stand, taking a boat motor and using its propeller as a makeshift chainsaw to kill some of the piranhas, but is seemingly killed in the process.

Meanwhile, Jake spots Laura and Zane on the island and forces Derrick to rescue them. Derrick accidentally crashes the boat into some submerged rocks in the process, flooding the lower deck and causing the boat to begin sinking. Kelly is trapped in the galley while Derrick, Crystal, and Andrew fall overboard. Andrew escapes to the shore, but Crystal is devoured and Derrick is badly wounded. Danni manages to get a partially-eaten Derrick back on board, where he eventually dies.

Julie and Novak reach Jake on a speedboat and attach a rope to his boat. Julie, Danni, Laura, and Zane start crossing the rope, but the piranhas latch onto Danni's hair, causing her to fall into the water, where she is ripped apart and devoured. The others make it across safely, but the rope comes loose. Jake ties the line to himself and goes to save Kelly, using Derrick's corpse to distract the piranhas. He ties her to him and lights a flare after releasing the gas from stored propane tanks. Novak speeds the boat away just as the piranhas surround Jake and Kelly. They are dragged to safety as the propane tanks explode, killing most of the piranhas.

A terrified Goodman calls Julie, who tells him that they seem to have killed most of the piranhas. Goodman tells her that the reproductive glands on the piranha they obtained were not mature; the piranhas that they have killed were merely juveniles. As Novak wonders aloud where the adult piranhas are, a dolphin-sized adult piranha leaps out of the water and devours him.

== Cast ==
- Elisabeth Shue as Julie Forester
- Steven R. McQueen as Jake Forester
- Adam Scott as Novak
- Jerry O'Connell as Derrick Jones
- Jessica Szohr as Kelly
- Kelly Brook as Danni
- Riley Steele as Crystal
- Ving Rhames as Deputy Fallon
- Dina Meyer as Paula
- Christopher Lloyd as Mr. Carl Goodman
- Ricardo Chavira as Sam
- Paul Scheer as Andrew
- Cody Longo as Todd Dupree
- Brooklynn Proulx as Laura Forester
- Eli Roth as wet T-shirt host
- Bonnie Morgan as inner tube girl
- Franck Khalfoun as Deputy Green
- Jason Spisak as Deputy Taylor Roberts
- Greg Nicotero as boat captain

Richard Dreyfuss said that he accepted the role after Bob Weinstein persuaded him by offering him a larger salary, which Dreyfuss later donated to charity. Dreyfuss also stated that the ill-fated character he plays is a parody and a near-reincarnation of Matt Hooper, the character he portrayed in the film Jaws (1975).

== Production ==
=== Development ===
Then-up-and-coming screenwriters Josh Stolberg and Pete Goldfinger wrote a spec script entitled Killer Fish for producer J. Todd Harris, the rights owner hired for Piranha due to their limited credentials at the time. Harris was impressed with the script and the duo were officially hired. In 2004, hot off the success of his film High Tension, French director Alexandre Aja was given an offer to direct the film, titled Piranha: Lake Havasu. Aja admired the script but wanted to tone down the script's comedic aspects in favor of more "suspense and tension". By June 2005, Chuck Russell was scheduled to direct the film, and made heavy rewrites to the Stolberg/Goldfinger draft, as well as incorporating elements from the original John Sayles script that Joe Dante directed the first time around. Chiller Films and Mark Canton were slated to produce the film, while Dimension Films acquired the distribution rights in January 2006. Russell's vision for the film, which would have cost an estimated $23 million, was described as an "underwater thriller" as opposed to Stolberg and Goldfinger's draft, which took place during spring break. By December 2006, filming was planned to begin in spring 2007. By March 2007, Aja circled back to the project as Russell would depart as director. Along with directing, Aja signed on to produce the film and rewrite the script with his filmmaking partner Grégory Levasseur.

=== Pre-production ===
In April 2009, Elisabeth Shue, Adam Scott, Ving Rhames and Richard Dreyfuss were cast in the film. The following month, Jessica Szohr, Jerry O'Connell, and Christopher Lloyd joined the cast. Dreyfuss, at first hesitant to make fun of his career, eventually agreed to do the film after getting a higher payment from the producers.

=== Filming ===
Production on the film was scheduled to begin late 2008, but was delayed until March 2009. In October 2008, Aja stated filming would begin in the spring. He further stated "It's such a difficult movie, not only because of the technicality of it and the CGI fish, but also because it all happens in a lake. We were supposed to start shooting now, but the longer to leave it the colder the water gets. The movie takes place during Spring Break and, of course, the studio wanted it ready for the summer, but if you've got 1,000 people who need to get murdered in the water, you have to wait for the right temperature for the water, for the weather, for everything."

Shooting took place in May 2009 at Bridgewater Channel in Lake Havasu, located in Lake Havasu City, Arizona. The water was also dyed red for the shooting. An estimated 80,000 gallons of fake blood was used during filming.

Asked about her underwater sequence with Riley Steele, Kelly Brook said, "It was really difficult. Holding your breath while making out with someone as hot as Steele. I had to learn to hold my breath for a very long time." Brook also said that the pair had to have "a lot of practice" before filming the scene.

=== Post-production ===
Citing constraints with 3D camera rigs shooting on water, SVP of post-production Jeff Maynard decided to shoot Piranha in 2D and converted to 3D in post production using a 3D conversion process. Unlike some other 3D-converted films released in 2010, Piranha's conversion was not done as an afterthought, and it was one of the first post-conversion processes to be well received by critics. The decision saved the company millions of dollars.

== Release ==
=== Theatrical ===
Piranha 3D's theatrical release date had been set for April 16, 2010, but was delayed. The film was planned to premiere on August 27, 2010, but in June 2010 was moved to August 20, 2010. The film's first trailer debuted with Avatar. A second trailer was shown in prints of A Nightmare on Elm Street and Inception. It was set to have a panel on 24 July 2010 as part of San Diego Comic-Con but was cancelled after convention organizers decided the footage that was planned to be shown was inappropriate. Nine minutes of footage, with some unfinished effects, were leaked onto websites. The clip used in promotional television ads and the trailer that shows Jessica Szohr's character, Kelly, face to face with a pack of piranhas was not used in the movie, and was used for promotion only.

=== Home media ===
The film was released on DVD, Blu-ray, and Blu-ray 3D formats on January 11, 2011. The "3D" part of the title was taken off the 2D releases to prevent confusion of the two formats. The film was released in Australia on December 30, 2010. The film was shown on British television on Channel 5 on February 10, 2013, for the first time, and in 2D format.

== Reception ==
=== Box office ===
Piranha 3D grossed $10,106,872 in its first 3 days, opening at No. 6 in the United States box office. In the United Kingdom, Piranha 3D opened at No. 4 at the box office, earning £1,487,119. The film eventually grossed $25,003,155 in the United States and Canada, and $58,185,010 in other territories, for a worldwide total of $83,188,165.

=== Critical response ===
On the review aggregator website Rotten Tomatoes, 76% of 131 critics' reviews are positive, with an average rating of 6.2/10. The website's consensus reads: "Playing exactly to expectations for a movie about killer fish run amok, Piranha 3-D dishes out gore, guffaws and gratuitous nudity with equal glee." Metacritic, which uses a weighted average, assigned the film a score of 53 out of 100, based on 20 critics, indicating "mixed or average" reviews. IMDB score is 5.5. A tongue-in-cheek scholarly review of the movie was written for the journal Copeia (Chakrabarty & Fink 2011), which reviewed the movie as if it were a documentary film. Audiences polled by CinemaScore gave the film an average grade of "C" on an A+ to F scale.

Empire gave the film three out of five stars, saying "Remember the film you hoped Snakes on a Plane would be – this is it! By any sane cinematic standards, meretricious trash ... but thrown at you with such good-humoured glee that it's hard to resist. It's a bumper-sticker of a movie: honk if you love tits and gore! Honk honk honk." Christy Lemire, film critic for the Associated Press, said "Run, don't walk: Piranha 3D is hilariously, cleverly gory. Mere words cannot describe how awesomely gnarly Piranha 3D is, how hugely entertaining, and how urgently you must get yourself to the theatre to see it. Like, now." HollywoodLife.com called the film "a campy masterpiece of a movie", adding "If you have an ounce of fun in your body, you will love this movie about killer piranhas that overtake a town of hotties – in 3D!" Peter Hall of Cinematical.com said "The gore, the nudity, the language, the gags, the characters – it's all always on the rise. Just when you think things could not possibly get more ridiculous, that the film has peaked, Aja and screenwriters Pete Goldfinger and Josh Stolberg manage to ram another syringe of adrenaline into its heart." The Hollywood Reporter referred to the film as "a pitch-perfect, guilty-pleasure serving of late-summer schlock that handily nails the tongue-in-cheek spirit of the Roger Corman original" while stating "Jaws it ain't – Aja exhibits little patience for such stuff as dramatic tension and tautly coiled suspense, and there are some undeniable choppy bits...but he never loses sight of the potential fun factor laid out in Pete Goldfinger and Josh Stolberg's script." The Orlando Sentinel gave the film one and a half stars out of four, stating that "Piranha 3D goes for the jugular. And generally misses, but generally in an amusing way."

== Music ==
Lakeshore Records released the soundtrack album of Piranha 3D which included mostly rap, dance, hip-hop and R&B music. Artists include Shwayze, Envy, Flatheads, Amanda Blank, Public Enemy, Dub Pistols, and Hadouken!.

== Sequel ==
Dimension Films announced a sequel shortly after the first film was released. The film is Piranha 3DD and is directed by John Gulager with Patrick Melton and Marcus Dunstan writing. It was released on June 1, 2012. It stars Danielle Panabaker, Matt Bush, David Koechner, Chris Zylka, Katrina Bowden and Gary Busey, with Ving Rhames, Paul Scheer and Christopher Lloyd reprising their roles from Piranha 3D. Piranha 3DD is set at a waterpark where the piranhas find a way through the pipes.

Following its release, it failed to generate the positive critical reaction of its predecessor and grossed $8,493,728 and 11% Rotten Tomatoes.
