= Furia (film) =

- French film poster
- Directed by: Alexandre Aja
- Written by: Alexandre Aja; Grégory Levasseur
- Based on: short story 'Graffiti' by Julio Cortázar
- Produced by: Alexandre Arcady
- Cinematography: Gerry Fisher
- Edited by: Pascale Fenouillet
- Music by: Brian May
- Production companies: Alexandre Films; Canal+ France 2
- Distributed by: BAC Films
- Release date: August 9, 1999
- Running time: 90 minutes
- Country: France
- Language: French
- Budget: $1.7 million
- Box office: $65.000

Furia is a 1999 French romantic post-apocalyptic sci-fi film directed by Alexandre Aja, who co-wrote the screenplay with Grégory Levasseur, adapted from the science fiction short story "Graffiti" by Julio Cortázar. It stars Stanislas Merhar and Marion Cotillard.

== Cast ==
- Stanislas Merhar as Théo
- Marion Cotillard as Elia
- Wadeck Stanczak as Laurence
- Pierre Vaneck as Aaron
- Carlo Brandt as Freddy
- Laura del Sol as Olga
- Jean-Claude de Goros as Tonio
- Étienne Chicot as Quicailler
- Yash Furia as Yash Furia

== See also ==
- List of French films of 1999
