= The Hills Have Eyes (2006 film) =

Horror film by Alexandre Aja

- Theatrical release poster
- Directed by: Alexandre Aja
- Screenplay by: Alexandre Aja; Grégory Levasseur
- Based on: The Hills Have Eyes by Wes Craven
- Produced by: Wes Craven; Marianne Maddalena; Peter Locke
- Starring: Aaron Stanford; Kathleen Quinlan; Vinessa Shaw; Emilie de Ravin; Dan Byrd; Robert Joy; Ted Levine
- Cinematography: Maxime Alexandre
- Edited by: Cainan Baxter
- Music by: tomandandy
- Production companies: Fox Searchlight Pictures; Major Studio Partners; Craven/Maddalena Films
- Distributed by: Fox Searchlight Pictures
- Release date: March 10, 2006
- Running time: 106 minutes
- Country: United States
- Language: English
- Budget: $15 million
- Box office: $70 million

The Hills Have Eyes is a 2006 American horror film directed by Alexandre Aja and co-written by Aja and Grégory Levasseur, in their English-language debut. It is a remake of Wes Craven's 1977 film of the same name. The film stars Aaron Stanford, Kathleen Quinlan, Vinessa Shaw, Emilie de Ravin, Dan Byrd, Robert Joy, and Ted Levine, and follows a family that is targeted by a group of cannibalistic mutants after their car breaks down in the desert.

The Hills Have Eyes was released theatrically in the United States and United Kingdom on March 10, 2006. It earned $15.5 million in its opening weekend in the United States, where it was originally rated NC-17 for strong, gruesome violence, but was later edited down to achieve an R rating. An unrated DVD version was released on June 20, 2006. A sequel, The Hills Have Eyes 2, was released in 2007.

== Plot ==
Between 1945 and 1962, a stretch of desert in New Mexico is used by the US military for nuclear weapons testing, leaving the region badly irradiated. A group of government researchers examining the aftermath of one test encounter a man calling for help, only to be ambushed and killed.

Decades later, retired detective "Big" Bob Carter and his wife Ethel are traveling from Cleveland to San Diego through the desert for their silver wedding anniversary; with them are their three children, Lynn, Brenda, and Bobby, Lynn's husband Doug and their baby daughter Catherine, and their two German Shepherds, Beauty and Beast. They stop at a gas station, where the elderly attendant suggests a different route through the hills, claiming it will save them a few hours. Not long after, their tires are punctured by a hidden spike strip, causing their car, which is towing a trailer, to crash.

Bob and Doug set off in opposite directions to find help, while the rest of the family stays by the trailer. Beauty escapes, and when Bobby chases her into the hills, he finds her butchered. Horrified, he flees back to the trailer, but falls off the hill on the way, knocking himself unconscious. A timid yet kind-hearted mutant named Ruby protects him from her brother, Goggle. Meanwhile, Bob arrives back at the gas station, where he finds newspaper clippings detailing various disappearances in the area after the nuclear tests at a mining town caused the mutants' deformities, as well as a bag of what he deduces to be the valuables of missing victims. He confronts the attendant, who then commits suicide. Bob attempts to flee in an abandoned car, but is subdued by the mutant leader, Papa Jupiter.

After Bobby is found by Brenda, Doug returns after heading towards the interstate. All he discovers at the end of the road is a huge crater filled with numerous abandoned cars and other belongings. When being pursued by Papa Jupiter, Bobby confesses his story to Doug and Lynn, just as Pluto and Lizard infiltrate the trailer. They attack and rape Brenda, who has stayed in the trailer with Catherine, while using a distraction of immolating Bob to divert the others. When Lynn and Ethel return to the trailer, Lizard shoots both of them before abducting Catherine and escaping with Pluto. Doug and Bobby return; Lynn and Ethel die shortly afterwards. Goggle, staying behind for recon, is set upon by Beast and mauled to death.

The next morning, Doug, along with Beast, sets out to rescue Catherine. He comes across an abandoned nuclear-testing village through the miner town's cave system, but is knocked unconscious by Big Mama. After awakening in an ice box containing previous victims' dismembered remains, he escapes and encounters Big Brain, who reveals the mutants' origins to him. Pluto appears and attacks Doug, but he manages to gain the upper hand and kill Pluto with his own axe before killing another mutant, Cyst. After ordering Lizard to kill Catherine, Big Brain is mauled to death by Beast. Ruby manages to take the baby from Lizard and escapes through the hills.

Back at the trailer, Brenda and Bobby build an explosive trap, which they set off when Brenda is attacked by Jupiter. Meanwhile, Doug catches up with Ruby, but Lizard attacks them before Ruby can hand Catherine over. A struggle ensues, and Doug defeats him with Cyst's shotgun. Ruby then gives Doug his daughter back. Lizard, still alive, aims the shotgun at Doug, but Ruby tackles Lizard off a cliff, sending them both falling to their deaths.

Bobby and Brenda find Jupiter wounded from their trap; Brenda kills him with a pickaxe. The siblings are reunited with Doug, Catherine, and Beast. As the survivors embrace, an unknown mutant watches them from afar through binoculars.

== Cast ==
- Aaron Stanford as Doug Bukowski
- Kathleen Quinlan as Ethel Carter
- Vinessa Shaw as Lynn Carter-Bukowski
- Emilie de Ravin as Brenda Carter
- Dan Byrd as Bobby Carter
- Tom Bower as Gas Station Attendant
- Billy Drago as Papa Jupiter
- Robert Joy as Lizard
- Ted Levine as "Big" Bob Carter
- Desmond Askew as Big Brain
- Ezra Buzzington as Goggle
- Michael Bailey Smith as Pluto
- Laura Ortiz as Ruby
- Maisie Camilleri Preziosi as Catherine Bukowski
- Greg Nicotero as Cyst
- Ivana Turchetto as Big Mama
- Judith Jane Vallette as Venus
- Adam Perrell as Mercury

== Production ==
Wes Craven, director and writer of The Hills Have Eyes (1977), considered a remake after he saw the success of other horror remakes such as The Texas Chainsaw Massacre (2003) and The Amityville Horror (2005). The search then began for filmmakers to helm the project. Marianne Maddalena, Craven's long-time producing partner, came across Alexandre Aja and his art director/collaborator Grégory Levasseur, who had previously made the French slasher film High Tension (2003). After showing the film to Craven and the rest of the production crew, they were impressed with the pair. Craven commented that they "demonstrated a multifaceted understanding of what is profoundly terrifying" and "after viewing the film and then meeting the film makers, I knew I wanted to work with them." Aja and Levasseur then began to rewrite the story in what was the pair's first American production. Initially, the remake was set up at Dimension Films as part of Craven's overall deal with Miramax, Dimension then put the film into turnaround, where it was acquired by Fox Searchlight.

Director Aja and art director Grégory Levasseur chose not to film in the original's filming location of Victorville, California, and instead scouted many locations for filming, including Namibia, South Africa, New Mexico, and Mexico. The two settled on Ouarzazate in Morocco, which was known as "the gateway to the Sahara".

The film is set in New Mexico, and strongly implies that a large number of atmospheric nuclear weapon tests were performed in that state. In fact, the only atmospheric nuclear detonation in New Mexico was the Trinity test, the first test of a nuclear device conducted on July 16, 1945. The United States carried out most of its atmospheric nuclear weapons tests at the Nevada Test Site and in the Marshall Islands at the lagoons of Bikini and Eniwetok, between 1946 and 1962. The theatrical poster shows Vinessa Shaw's character prone, with a mutant hand on her face.

During the opening sequence, flashes of deformed children are shown. These children are victims of Agent Orange, infamous for its use during the Vietnam War.

=== Effects ===
Prior to filming, Aja and Levasseur had already conceived an idea for the mutants' appearance. "We based all our descriptions and directions on real documents, pictures, and footage that we found on the effects of nuclear fallout in Chernobyl and Hiroshima", explains Aja.

The Hills Have Eyes used the K.N.B. EFX Group Inc., which spent over six months designing the mutants, first using three-dimensional designer tools, such as ZBrush, allowing them to use a computer to generate their sculptures. After prosthetics were made, they could be fitted to the actors before filming. Robert Joy, who plays the mutant Lizard, explained, "Every day, these amazing artists took more than three hours to transform me into something that could only be found in a nightmare." K.N.B. artist Gregory Nicotero made a cameo as Cyst, the mutant with the halo headgear.

Jamison Goei and his team had done over 130 visual effects for the film. A large part of that was digitally constructing the testing village, which in actuality was only one built street with others digitally added. The team also warped the mutant's faces slightly, which is shown mostly in the character of Ruby.

Papa Jupiter displays no deformities. However, as shown in "The Making Of", Papa Jupiter appears to have a large parasitic twin attached to his upper left torso. The young children of the film had their deformities added by CGI, with the exception of Ruby, who had a combination of CGI and makeup.

=== Casting ===
The casting process began with the selection of Ted Levine as the character Big Bob. Levine was also a fan of the film High Tension. Afterward, Kathleen Quinlan was cast as Ethel in her first lead role in a horror film, although she appeared in the horror films Twilight Zone: The Movie (1983) and Event Horizon (1997). Next, Aaron Stanford was cast as Doug Bukowski, who "undergoes the most radical transformation of anyone in the Carter family". Stanford even asked not to see any of the mutants in make-up before his character's battle in the testing village, so he would be truly frightened. When casting Lynn, Doug's wife, Aja wanted to cast Vinessa Shaw, with whom he had wanted to work since seeing her in Eyes Wide Shut (1999). Shaw was hesitant to play the role, but after watching High Tension, she agreed, explaining: "There was such an odd combination of beauty and terror, it felt almost like an art film. So, after meeting with Alex and Greg, I decided to do it." For the role of Brenda, the filmmakers sought a young actress who had relatively little exposure, and found her in Emilie de Ravin, who was beginning her rise in the television series Lost. After de Ravin, Dan Byrd was cast as Bobby. Aja then had the six actors arrive in the filming location of Morocco early to bond together.

When casting for the mutants, associate producer Cody Zwieg explained: "We needed to find actors who could not only perform the stunt work, handle the extensive makeup and perform in that makeup, but [also] who truly could embody the fierce, primal nature of the mutants' way of life." To play the role of Pluto, Aja looked to Michael Bailey Smith. For Lizard, the filmmakers cast Robert Joy. Ezra Buzzington, impressed with the filmmakers, agreed to play the role of Goggle, and even watched a documentary about human cultures engaging in cannibalism. To play the mutant leader, Billy Drago was cast. The most difficult mutant to cast was Ruby, who was a "touch of sweetness to the madness of the mutants." Laura Ortiz was ultimately cast, making her film debut.

== Music ==
=== Soundtrack ===
The Hills Have Eyes (Original Motion Picture Soundtrack)

Film score by Various
- Released: March 7, 2006
- Genres: Soundtracks; Film scores
- Length: 70:14
- Label: Lakeshore Records 33852

The Hill Have Eyes chronology
The Hills Have Eyes (Original Motion Picture Soundtrack) (2006)	The Hills Have Eyes 2 (2007)

The soundtrack score was composed by tomandandy. The record was released on March 7, 2006, via Lakeshore Records label.

Track listing

US edition

Tracks 10 to 29 are all original music composed by tomandandy

1. Leave the Broken Hearts – The Finalist
2. Blue Eyes Woman – The Go
3. Highway Kind – Moot Davis
4. Summers Gonna Be My Girl – The Go
5. More and More – Webb Pierce
6. The Walls – Vault
7. In the Valley of the Sun – Buddy Stewart
8. Daisy – Wires on Fire
9. California Dreamin' – The Mamas & the Papas
10. Forbidden Zone
11. Gas Haven
12. Out House
13. Praying
14. Beauty
15. Ravens
16. Daddy Daddy
17. Beast Finds Beauty
18. Trailer
19. Aftermath
20. Ethel's Death
21. Next Morning
22. Mine
23. Village Test
24. Breakfast Time
25. Play with Us
26. The Quest I
27. The Quest II
28. Sacrifice
29. It's Over?

== Reception ==
=== Box office ===
The Hills Have Eyes was a commercial success, playing in total 2,521 theaters and taking in $15,708,512 in its opening weekend. The film grossed $41,778,863 in the United States box office and $70,000,000 worldwide, surpassing its budget costs by over fourfold.

The film placed third at the box office during its opening week. It dropped to fifth after its second week of release, and to eighth after its third week. It fell out of the top 10 into 12th place after four weeks in release. After five weeks, it placed 17th at the box office, and it fell out of the top 20 into 21st place after its sixth week. It continued to fall in subsequent weeks.

The Hills Have Eyes was first released for a total of 105 days, or 15 weeks, with its final showing on June 22, 2006.

=== Critical response ===
Reviews were mixed, with an average critic rating of 51% on Rotten Tomatoes based on 137 reviews. The critical consensus stated, "Faster paced for today's audiences, this Hills remake ratchets up the gore for the hardcore horror fans, but will turn away casual audiences." Review aggregator Metacritic, which assigns a weighted average score out of 100 to reviews from mainstream critics, the film received an average score of 52 based on 28 reviews. The Washington Post said: "this remake of the alleged 1977 Wes Craven classic has one very disturbing quality: It's too damned good." Some have gone on to refer to the film as torture porn. Bloody Disgusting, however, was scathing of those who referred to the movie's genre as such, saying "some may call it 'torture porn'—these people are idiots". Roger Ebert gave a negative review, mentioning that the characters in the film are not familiar with horror movies, and went on to cite that the film should have focused more on the characters rather than the violence, saying "The Hills Have Eyes finds an intriguing setting in 'typical' fake towns built by the government [...] But its mutants are simply engines of destruction. There is a misshapen creature who coordinates attacks with a walkie-talkie; I would have liked to know more about him, but no luck."

== Sequel ==
A sequel, The Hills Have Eyes 2, was released in theaters on March 23, 2007, by Fox Atomic, and features a mainly different cast and crew. It is not a remake of The Hills Have Eyes Part II (1985).
