= Alexandre Aja =

French filmmaker (born 1978)

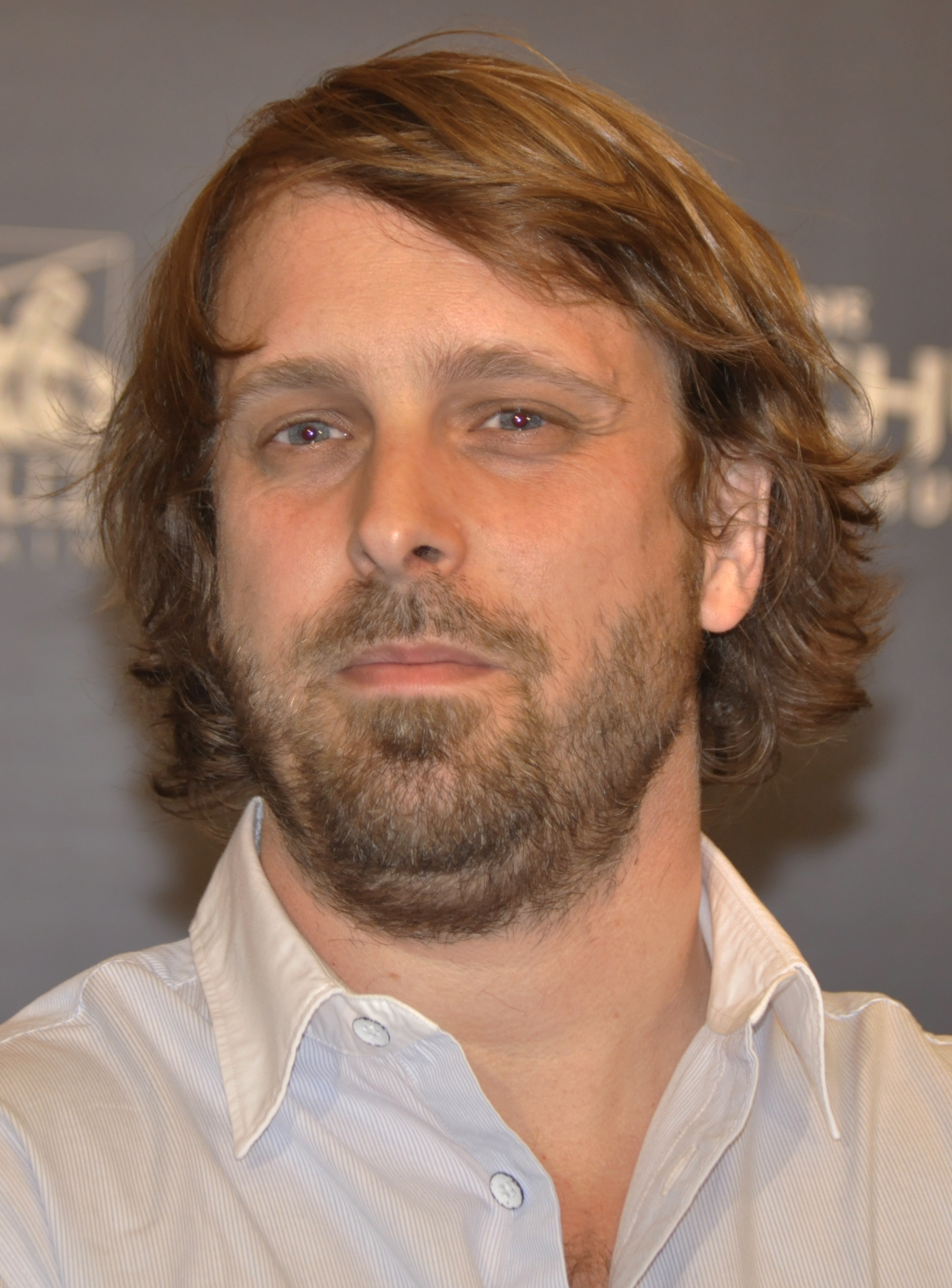
- Aja in 2015
- Born: Alexandre Jouan-Arcady; 7 August 1978 (age 48); Paris, France
- Occupations: Film director; film producer; screenwriter
- Years active: 1997–present
- Notable work: Haute Tension, The Hills Have Eyes, Mirrors, Piranha 3D, Oxygen
- Father: Alexandre Arcady
- Relatives: Diane Kurys (stepmother); Sacha Sperling (half-brother)

Alexandre Jouan-Arcady, known professionally as Alexandre Aja (French: [alɛksɑ̃dʁ aʒa]; born 7 August 1978), is a French filmmaker best known for his work in the horror genre. He rose to international stardom for his 2003 horror film Haute Tension (known as High Tension in the US and Switchblade Romance in the UK). He has also directed the films The Hills Have Eyes (2006), Mirrors (2008), Piranha 3D (2010), Horns (2013) and Crawl (2019).

== Personal life ==
Aja was born and raised in Paris. He is the son of film director Alexandre Arcady and journalist Marie-Jo Jouan. His professional surname, Aja, is derived from his given name and his parents' surnames.

== Career ==
Aja acted at a very young age in minor roles in his father's films such as Le Grand Carnaval, and the two Le Grand Pardon films.

He made his directorial debut at the age of eighteen with the short film Over the Rainbow, which was selected for the short-film competition at the 1997 Cannes Film Festival. In 1999 he directed Furia, a film based on Julio Cortázar's short story Graffiti. From Furia and his next features, he frequently works with Grégory Levasseur as writers such as in The Hills Have Eyes, Mirrors, P2, and Piranha 3D. Levasseur also made his works as production designer too.

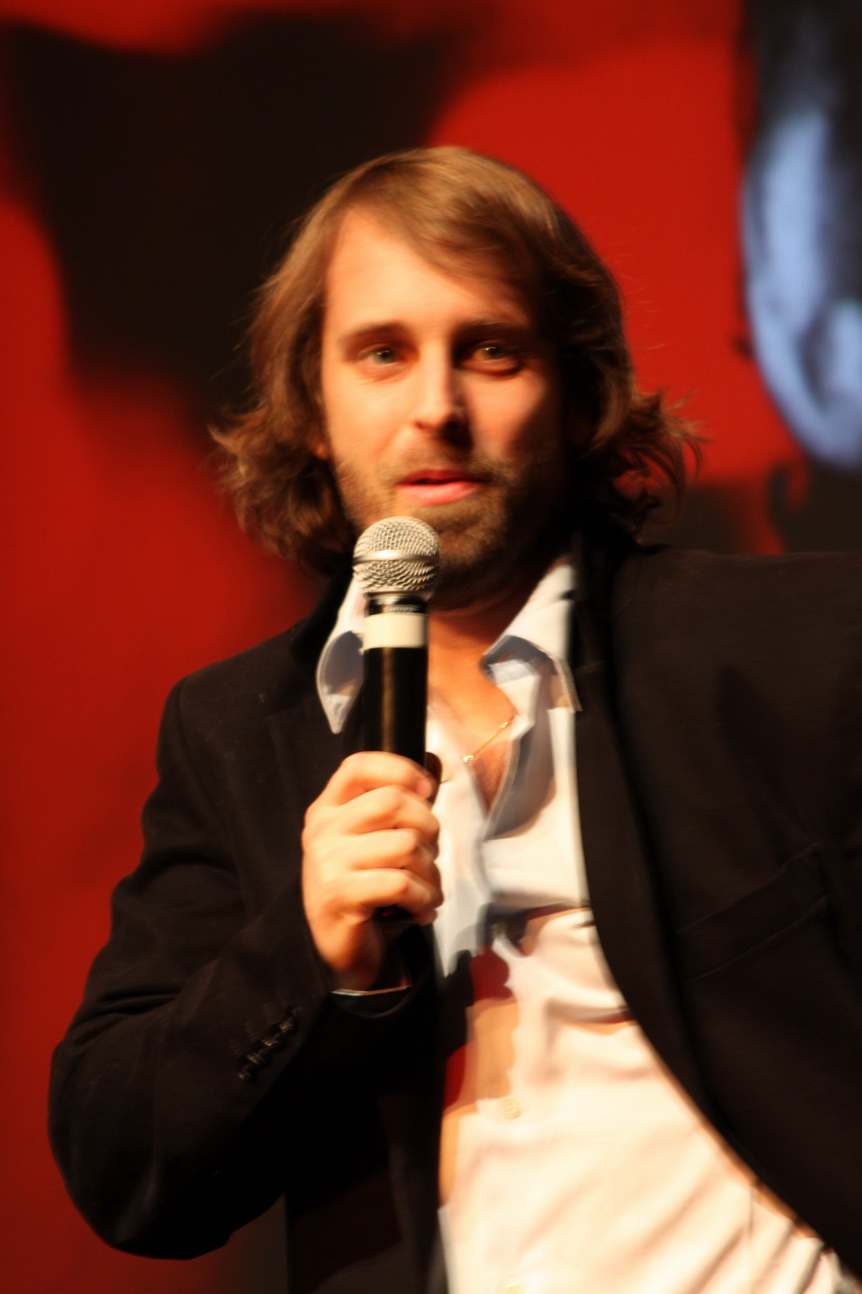
Aja in January 2011

Aja directed Haute Tension, which was released in France in 2003 and in the United States in 2005. The French slasher, though sticking to horror conventions, pushed the envelope of gore and tension. Favouring make-up effects over computer-generated imagery, the film quickly found respect among horror fans. It was released in the US as High Tension, after some editing. The film was nominated for the grand prize at the Amsterdam Fantastic Film Festival, and earned Aja awards for Best Direction and Best Fantasy Film at the Sitges Film Festival.

After seeing High Tension, Wes Craven asked Aja to develop a concept for a remake of his 1977 film The Hills Have Eyes, which Aja subsequently directed.

His next project was a horror film entitled Mirrors, about a mysterious mirror that brings out the worst aspects of people whenever they look at themselves in it. The film is a remake of the K-Horror film Into the Mirror. Aja directed Piranha 3D, a horror movie about prehistoric piranhas in Arizona. It is a remake of the 1978 film Piranha.

Because Aja was working on Mirrors, he did not direct The Hills Have Eyes 2, which was released on 10 March 2007.

In 2004, Aja was named by Variety on the Ten Directors to Watch list. He is a member of the so-called Splat Pack, a term coined by film historian Alan Jones in Total Film magazine for a new wave of directors making brutally violent horror films. The other Splat Pack members are Darren Lynn Bousman, Neil Marshall, Greg McLean, Eli Roth, James Wan, Leigh Whannell, and Rob Zombie.

Aja has been associated with the New French Extremity and the resurgence of French horror cinema in the early twenty-first century.

Aja produced a remake of the 1980 horror slasher Maniac, starring Elijah Wood. The film was released in 2012. In 2013, he directed the dark fantasy thriller Horns, starring Daniel Radcliffe, Juno Temple, Joe Anderson, James Remar, Kelli Garner and Max Minghella. He also produced the 2014 horror film The Pyramid directed by Grégory Levasseur and starring Ashley Hinshaw, Denis O'Hare, and James Buckley. Aja produced and directed the 2016 psychological thriller film The 9th Life of Louis Drax, which is based on a novel by Liz Jensen.

Aja is set to direct a live action adaptation of the manga series Space Adventure Cobra, and the Mice and Mystics film for DreamWorks Animation. In 2019, Aja directed Crawl.

On 6 February 2026, it was announced that Aja would direct a sequel to the action horror film Under Paris for Netflix.

On 13 February 2026, it was announced that Aja would co-write a film adaptation of Dead by Daylight with David Leslie Johnson-McGoldrick for Blumhouse Productions, Atomic Monster and Behaviour Interactive.

== Filmography ==
Year	Title	Director	Producer	Writer	Notes	Ref(s)
1999	Furia	Yes	No	Yes		
2002	Entre chiens et loups	No	No	Yes	Also second assistant director	
2003	High Tension	Yes	No	Yes		
2006	The Hills Have Eyes	Yes	No	Yes		
2007	P2	No	Yes	Yes	Also story author	
2008	Mirrors	Yes	No	Yes		
2010	Piranha 3D	Yes	Yes	No		
2012	Maniac	No	Yes	Yes		
2013	Horns	Yes	Yes	No		
2014	The Pyramid	No	Yes	No		
2016	The Other Side of the Door	No	Yes	No		
2016	The 9th Life of Louis Drax	Yes	Yes	No		
2019	Crawl	Yes	Yes	No		
2021	Oxygen	Yes	Yes	No		
2023	Night of the Hunted	No	Yes	No		
2024	Never Let Go	Yes	Yes	No		
2027	Under Paris 2	Yes	Yes	Yes		
2027	Crawl 2	Yes	Yes	Yes		

Other credits

Year	Title	Role	Ref(s)
2004	Mariage mixte	Second unit director	
2005	Marock	Artistic advisor, technical advisor	
2013	Rock the Casbah	Associate producer	
2016	La Rage du démon	Himself	
2017	47 Meters Down	Executive producer	

== See also ==
- Furia (album)
