= Maniac (2012 film) =

2012 French psychological slasher film directed by Franck Khalfoun

- Theatrical release poster
- Directed by: Franck Khalfoun
- Screenplay by: Alexandre Aja; Grégory Levasseur
- Based on: Maniac by Joe Spinell
- Produced by: Alexandre Aja; Thomas Langmann; William Lustig
- Starring: Elijah Wood; Nora Arnezeder; Genevieve Alexandra; Jan Broberg Felt; Megan M. Duffy; Liane Balaban; Joshua De La Garza; America Olivo; Sammi Rotibi
- Cinematography: Maxime Alexandre
- Edited by: Baxter
- Music by: Rob
- Production companies: Canal+; Ciné+; La Petite Reine; Studio 37; Blue Underground
- Distributed by: Warner Bros. Pictures (France); IFC Midnight (United States)
- Release dates: May 26, 2012 (Cannes); January 2, 2013 (France); June 21, 2013 (United States)
- Running time: 89 minutes
- Countries: France; United States
- Language: English
- Box office: $2.6 million

Maniac is a 2012 psychological slasher film directed by Franck Khalfoun, written by Alexandre Aja and Grégory Levasseur, and starring Elijah Wood and Nora Arnezeder. It is a remake of the 1980 film of the same name, and follows the violent exploits of a brutal serial killer.

The film is an international co-production produced by the French film companies La Petite Reine and Studio 37. Unlike the original 1980 film, which is set in New York City, writers Aja and Levasseur chose to set the film in Los Angeles.

Most of the film was shot in the murderer's first-person point of view since Khalfoun found that not many horror films were shot in a first-person POV. The film was first screened at the Cannes Film Festival in May 2012 and premiered in the United States in March 2013.

== Plot ==
Frank Zito is a schizophrenic young man who has taken over his family's mannequin restoration business after the recent death of his mother. Frank was traumatized as a child by his mother, a prostitute who made him watch her have sex with her johns. As an adult, he murders and scalps women and attaches their hair onto his mannequins to recreate his one happy childhood memory: brushing his mother's hair before she "went out" at night.

Frank joins a dating site, where he gets a date with a woman named Lucie. The two go out to dinner and return to Lucie's apartment, where she attempts to seduce the virginal Frank, mistaking his increasing panic for nervousness. Frank strangles Lucie, scalps her and takes her hair back to his apartment, where he attaches it to another mannequin.

One morning, Frank awakens to find a photographer named Anna taking photos of the mannequins in his storefront. Frank invites her into his store, where she is taken with his work restoring antique department store mannequins. The two develop a friendship, with Frank agreeing to help Anna put together an art exhibit using his mannequins. Frank falls in love with her and starts taking medication to control his violent urges. Frank nevertheless kills again, stabbing a young dancer to death and attaching her scalp to another mannequin.

At the opening of the exhibit, Frank meets Anna's boyfriend Jason, as well as art director and Anna's mentor Rita. Both mock him for his interest in mannequins, questioning his sexual orientation. Frank later follows Rita home, subdues her in the bathtub and hog-ties her on her bed. Identifying Rita with his mother, Frank voices his resentment and sense of abandonment, finally scalping Rita alive in a fit of rage.

The next day, Frank calls Anna, who tearfully tells him of Rita's murder and of her recent breakup with Jason. Frank comes to Anna's apartment to comfort her but inadvertently reveals his guilt by mentioning things that only the killer would know. Realizing that Frank is the killer, Anna stabs Frank through the hand with a knife before locking herself in her bedroom. Anna's neighbor, Martin, breaks into the apartment to save her, only for Frank to kill him with a cleaver. Breaking down Anna's bathroom door, Frank puts her into a choke hold and knocks her unconscious. Frank loads Anna's body into his van and drives home, but as he opens the doors Anna regains consciousness and stabs him in the stomach with a piece of rebar attached to a mannequin hand. Anna flees and is picked up by a passing car, whose driver panics at the sight of a blood-covered Frank and runs him down, crashing and flinging Anna through the windshield. Bloodied, Frank hobbles to the mortally injured Anna and scalps her as she dies.

Frank returns to his apartment, attaching Anna's hair to a mannequin dressed in a bridal gown. As he succumbs to his injuries, Frank suffers hallucinations of the mannequins transforming into his victims and beginning to tear his body apart, finally ripping off his face to reveal a mannequin head. Before he dies, Frank sees Anna, clad in a wedding dress, lower her veil and turn her back on him. Later that day, a SWAT team breaks into Frank's apartment, only to find Frank's corpse in his closet, alongside his collection of scalps.

== Cast ==
- Elijah Wood as Frank Zito
- Nora Arnezeder as Anna D'Antoni
- Jan Broberg as Rita
- Liane Balaban as Judy
- America Olivo as Angela Zito, Frank's mother
- Joshua De La Garza as Martin Nunez
- Morgane Slemp as Jenna
- Sal Landi as Detective
- Genevieve Alexandra as Jessica
- Sammi Rotibi as Jason
- Megan M. Duffy as Lucie
- Bryan Lugo as Officer Burton

== Production ==
Nearly the entire film is shot from the murderer's point of view, with his face being shown only in reflections and occasionally in the third person. This "proved to be challenging on both a narrative and technical level for the filmmakers and cast". Because of this point of view technique, Elijah Wood had to be present nearly every day of filming, which is unusual. Wood told an interviewer: "It's the most intriguing element of the film. It meant I could create this character in a completely different way. It became about hearing him and feeling him rather than seeing him. And you only see him in flashes, so they become very intense character revealing moments. I've never played someone so dark before. It was interesting to go there". He added: "The four-week shoot was very technical so you kind of become desensitised to what is very disturbing material. None of us had ever made a PoV [point-of-view] film before. There was this whole element of the character that was basically the camera. I've never worked so closely with a DP [director of photography] before. I would be behind him the whole time, tapping on his shoulder to make him move faster or slower. It was a totally fascinating way to work".

Director Khalfoun told an interviewer: "He has this good guy sort of package. Usually an actor's baggage can hurt your character, but he really is just this good guy sort of persona so I couldn't wait to turn him into a horrible beast. I think for his fans it's shocking too, and it adds to the shock value of the film". Khalfoun said in another interview: "POV (Point of View) has been in movies since Peeping Tom, but no horror film had ever been entirely shot that way... I wanted the audience to feel trapped in his body. The cinema plays a big part in that concept since you are stuck in your seat forced to experience the events with little control over the outcome. Much like Frank is stuck in his body. You are therefore at the same time complicit and repulsed. Therein lies the horror".

Wood described some of the filming process to The Guardian: "The whole film is primarily shown from the character's perspective, so 70% of the process involved working with the director of photography Maxime Alexandre. Maxime was effectively the character as well as me, and the rest of Frank had to be created locally through his inner monologue, which I recorded on an audio stage afterwards... We approached the point-of-view thing with a certain naivety. At first, we thought we'd use a body double. We quickly discovered that didn't work. So I was there the whole time, dancing around behind the camera, leaning forward to put my hand in the frame. Every sequence was a learning process".

Wood told, however, that they did use a body double's hands in some scenes: "I also had a counterpart who could 'be' my left or my right hand because I couldn't always use both hands in a natural way, depending on where the camera was. So we literally held things together and handed things off as if it were the same person. It was a lot of choreography!... Most of the time I couldn't get both of my hands on either side of the camera, because the rig was too big. So there'd be times when I'd be on one side with my right hand, and then my double would be on the left side with his left hand, so we'd have to work together a lot, like moving an object from one hand to another. And if you're trying to do that with two different hands, it's pretty challenging to make that look pretty natural".

Blocking the scenes, Wood said, was "a 'puzzle' as they had to map out how each scene was covered within the context of the POV nature. Being on set felt far more technical than emotional. I was thinking about how I was going to fit into the construct of a shot. It had more to do with physicality than my emotional state of being except for the reflections that were relatively intense moments".

Khalfoun said: "It was a real marriage between Maxime's camera work and Elijah. You see Frank throughout the movie sporadically and Elijah was there to make sure the camera moved the right way and the lines were delivered correctly. It was important he be there. It was the first time I had seen an actor work so closely and technically with the camera to guide it through where he would be or actually do". Khalfoun employed angles and mirrors to conceal the cameras while filming reflections.

=== Post-production ===
Only some of Wood's dialogue was recorded while shooting. Wood said that the additional dialogue recording (ADR) was crucial to creating the character of Frank: "I knew that the character had to come alive when you didn't see him. So most of that was done in the ADR stage in post-production; I felt the character was kind of created there, for the most part". He told an interviewer: "I always felt like the heart of the character and the depths of the darkness of the character were going to happen in the ADR stage".

The film poster was designed by the award-winning Sam Ashby.

=== Score ===
The film was scored by French composer Robin Coudert, credited simply as "Rob". Bloody Disgusting judged the music to be "one of the best parts" of the film, and Screen International wrote that the "'80s style synth score is reminiscent of John Carpenter", a horror movie director who has provided the musical score for many of his own films.

The Hollywood Reporter declared: "The nerve-shredding score, by the mono-monikered Rob, salutes the music Italian prog-rockers Goblin provided for [Dario] Argento's early horror-thrillers, the 1980s electronica lending a deeply melancholic city-at-night vibe". Fangoria called the soundtrack "delightful". A reviewer for the Geeks of Doom website thought that "composer Rob's synth-heavy score" was "reminiscent of Cliff Martinez's Drive soundtrack and the electronic music composed by Wendy Carlos for Stanley Kubrick's A Clockwork Orange".

== Distribution ==
The film's North American rights were picked up by distributor IFC Midnight in August 2012.

== Release ==
A red band trailer was released May 25, 2012 and the film was screened at the Cannes Film Festival the following day. Warner Brothers released an online video of the first six minutes of the film in late 2012. An international behind-the-scenes "featurette" was made available online in December the same year.

Maniac opened in German theaters in December 2012, and in other European countries in March 2013. Maniac had its USA premiere at the Mad Monster Party? horror convention in Charlotte, North Carolina, on March 23, 2013. It was later released at the IFC Center in New York City on June 21.

DVD release company Blue Underground is cited in the opening credits. The film was made available through iTunes, cable video on demand, Amazon Video, SundanceNow.com, and elsewhere.

== Reception ==
=== Critical reaction ===
Maniac has a 53% approval rating on the review aggregator website Rotten Tomatoes based on 74 reviews and an average score of 5.08/10. The consensus says: "Shocking and bloody, Maniac is smarter than your average psychological slasher, but it's often undermined by its excessive gore".

Front Row Reviews called it "one of the strongest and most beautiful classic horror stories of our generation... visually and audibly stunning".

Complex magazine wrote that "having seen it, we can confirm that Maniac is an early frontrunner for 2013's best horror movie". The Hollywood Reporter wrote that Wood's "forever-young face, often an asset in projecting innocence, is here a sign of a man-child emotionally interrupted, as he stalks down women and removes their scalps in a rampage that begins shortly after the death of his mother".

Megan Lehmann, who watched the film at the Cannes Film Festival for The Hollywood Reporter, wrote in her review: "Wood's limpid saucer eyes are used here to telegraph unhinged blood-lust and insanity, even if only sporadically, as he plays a sicko with mommy issues who scalps his female victims. The twist, and what helps elevate the nasty, no-holds-barred Maniac from the grindhouse to an out-of-competition midnight-screening slot in Cannes, is that the entire movie is shot from the killer's POV – we only glimpse Wood in reflection and in photographs. It's a daring decision, potentially stripping the film of the suspense of not knowing where the killer is and obliquely inviting the audience to have empathy with him. For the most part, Khalfoun and cinematographer Maxime Alexandre pull it off, although the technique more than once tips over from inventively arty to film-school-grad pretentious. Slasher-movie fans, however, need not be put off by the stylized camera work and arty patina: this is down and dirty genre filmmaking, and the various slaughters, excruciatingly detailed scalpings and other atrocities are no less gruesome because of the highfalutin approach... The movie is essentially a sadistic art-house bloodbath, with opera music and ballet dancers and funky little art galleries".

A reviewer for SciFiNow praised the film's "fresh and challenging approach" and said "Khalfoun's version is arguably a more troubling piece of work than its predecessor. By forcing us to see through the eyes of a man who brutally murders women, the issues of voyeurism and misogyny rear their ugly heads before you've even settled in... Maniac is certainly brutal and gory, but it's the manner in which the violence is presented that really turns the stomach. This unsavoury but powerful trick is contrasted by the decision to switch out the grimy night-time world of Eighties New York for the neon landscape of Los Angeles, complete with a superb synth-heavy soundtrack that makes the film feel more like Nicolas Winding Refn's Drive than anything from the gloomy Platinum Dunes remake stable or the winking throwbacks of the Grindhouse movies".

Daniel Krupa reviewed the film for the IGN website, calling it "violent, gruesome, shocking, and extremely cruel" but "also entertaining, darkly amusing, smart, and impeccably well-made". The first-person point of view filming, he said, is not "an idle stylistic flourish, though, since it has a serious impact on how the audience experiences the movie... It's uncomfortable and queasy stuff, but it occasionally achieves a kind of weird beauty". A review on the Geeks of Doom website said "Elijah Wood provides a chilling, downright eerie performance as Frank – even though he's seldom on-screen. Wood communicates Frank's mental illness by muttering to himself and carrying on conversations with his mannequins – grunting like a rabid animal as he stalks his prey – while Arnezeder makes for a compelling, sympathetic 'final girl' who challenges Wood's maniac in unconventional ways. Overall, Maniac is a well-made, artistic take on Lustig's guerrilla-gore flick that manages to give the viewer the requisite blood and brutality while adding some much-needed psychological underpinning to the characters and their motivations. There's a lot to appreciate in Khalfoun's film – a stylish, modern-day slasher that is deeply disturbing and compelling".

The ScreenRant.com review called the film a "solid revival of a genre that's gone rather stale in the last decade" and said: "With its throwback synthesizer score, sustained point-of-view shots, and shadowy lighting, the preview certainly evokes a sense of gut-churning dread". Wood's acting was praised: "Though this isn't the first time Wood has played a serial killer, the trailer makes it clear that this isn't simply a rehash of his wordless, goggle-eyed performance as Kevin in Sin City. With a voice that mixes breathy, genuinely unsettling obsession with a childlike honesty, Wood's interpretation of Frank looks to be a new creature entirely".

New Empress Magazine criticized the film: "The digital cinematography by Maxime Alexandre uses an annoyingly stylized gloss over a lot of the potential scuzziness, leaving run-down downtown Los Angeles as industrial and neglected, but not forbidding, creating an atmosphere reminiscent of a video game. The aesthetic choices also make the murders seem unreal and even pixelated, with a blotchy and heightened crimson colour accompanying every scalping. Such a pity then, that the opportunity for a truly horrifying cinematic experience has been botched through odd directional choices by Franck Khalfoun and photography that creates style over substance, reducing the impact of a serial killer with so much potential to horrify and disturb us".

=== Audience reaction ===
Khalfoun said that audience members have vomited and fainted, and he took the reactions "as a compliment", explaining: "We had a screening here in Los Angeles and somebody passed out, which I pat myself on the back for. The movie had to creep on you – it's a different kind of fear; it's more of a nauseating fear. You really have the opportunity to maybe feel the [nausea] of committing crime rather than glorifying it just for the aspect of fun and thrill. The audience gets to experience for the first time how sick [it is to commit murder] – we're certainly not condoning it, but making a real statement about serial killers".

=== Awards ===
- 2013 – Audience Award for Feature Film at Stanley Film Festival.
- 2013 – Best Actor in Leading Role: Elijah Wood, Best Editing: Baxter, Franck Khalfoun – Fright Meter Awards
- 2014 – Best Actor: Elijah Wood, Best Score: Robin Coudert – Fangoria.

== Soundtrack ==
The CD soundtrack composed by Robin Coudert (aka Rob) is available on Music Box Records label website.
