= Oxygen (2021 film) =

French-American science fiction thriller film

- Official release poster
- Directed by: Alexandre Aja
- Written by: Christie LeBlanc
- Produced by: Alexandre Aja; Grégory Levasseur; Vincent Maraval; Brahim Chioua; Noëmie Devide
- Starring: Mélanie Laurent; Mathieu Amalric; Malik Zidi
- Cinematography: Maxime Alexandre
- Edited by: Stéphane Roche
- Music by: ROB
- Production companies: Gateway Films; Wild Bunch; Echo Lake Entertainment
- Distributed by: Netflix
- Release date: May 12, 2021
- Running time: 101 minutes
- Countries: United States; France
- Language: French

Oxygen (French: Oxygène, stylized as Oxygene O2) is a 2021 French-language science fiction psychological thriller film produced and directed by Alexandre Aja and written by Christie LeBlanc. An American-French co-production, it stars Mélanie Laurent as a woman who awakens trapped in an airtight medical cryogenic unit, with Mathieu Amalric and Malik Zidi in supporting roles. The film was released by Netflix on May 12, 2021, and received generally positive reviews from critics.

== Plot ==
A woman awakens in an airtight medical cryogenic unit, and discovers that she is trapped and that the unit's oxygen levels are falling rapidly. Suffering from memory loss, she does not remember who she is or how she got there. She is assisted by an advanced AI named M.I.L.O. (Medical Interface Liaison Officer), but it refuses to open the cryo unit without an administrator code. Using M.I.L.O., she is able to transmit outside the pod and contact emergency services. She provides them with the cryo unit's model and serial number, which are printed on the interior. Upon contacting the manufacturer they are told the unit was destroyed three years prior. Unable to recall her memories, she looks for clues about her past by searching for pictures and articles from M.I.L.O. and finds her name, Elizabeth (Liz) Hansen. She realizes she is a cryogenic doctor. She finds her husband, Léo Ferguson, and his contact number by accessing her social media, but when she calls his number a woman answers. She tells the woman that she is Léo's wife and demands to speak to him. The woman seems confused and hangs up.

As the oxygen level continues to fall, Liz begins hallucinating and tries to open the pod, only to receive an electric shock. She then receives a call back from the police but suspects they are hiding something from her, and disconnects. The unknown woman she called earlier rings and tells her that Léo is dead. She also gives her the administrator code to open the pod, but tells her that if she opens the pod, she will die. Liz uses the code to give herself administrator access, but stops short of opening the pod when the unknown woman begs her to listen. Following the woman's instructions, Liz accesses controls for a centrifuge, and turns the centrifuge off. She begins floating weightlessly. After a brief explanation, it is revealed that she was placed into hypersleep 12 years ago, and has just embarked on a 34-year journey to a planet 14 light-years away. The mission is secret and mankind will be extinct in the near future due to a deadly virus – the virus that killed Léo.

Heartbroken, she learns that the awakening was due to a processor overheating, and realizes she must divert the functions of the processor to a less sophisticated processor assigned to non-essential functions, but fails since the data exceeds that processor's capacity. As time passes and with the oxygen level fading, she prepares for suicide by attempting to open the pod. Shortly after, she discovers Léo is also in hypersleep in the damaged spaceship together with nearly 10,000 others, but she notices he lacks a scar on his forehead that he had before. Upon further investigation, through a video of a presentation by an elderly version of her, it is revealed that she is a genetic clone with the original Elizabeth Hansen's personality and memories implanted, including memories of Léo. The woman she has been speaking to on Earth who designed the hypersleep units was herself, but the call disconnects as the spacecraft moves out of communications range.

M.I.L.O. activates a euthanasia protocol due to a perceived zero percent chance of survival; however, Liz manages to deactivate the euthanasia processor and successfully reassigns the malfunctioning processor's functions to it. As her oxygen level counts down to zero, Liz manages to reroute oxygen from the pods containing dead colonists, and M.I.L.O. puts her back in hypersleep.

The clones of Léo and Elizabeth are then shown on their new home planet, smiling and embracing each other.

== Cast ==
- Mélanie Laurent as Dr. Elizabeth "Liz" Hansen
- Mathieu Amalric as M.I.L.O.
- Malik Zidi as Léo Ferguson

== Production ==
In July 2017, it was announced Anne Hathaway had joined the cast of the film and would serve as a producer on the film, with Echo Lake Entertainment and IM Global attached to produce the film (under the working title O2), from a screenplay by Christie LeBlanc. In February 2020, it was announced Noomi Rapace had joined the cast of the film, replacing Hathaway, with Franck Khalfoun directing the film, and Alexandre Aja serving as producer. In July 2020, Mélanie Laurent, Mathieu Amalric, and Malik Zidi joined the cast, replacing Rapace, with Aja serving as director replacing Khalfoun, and Adam Riback and James Engle executive producing through Echo Lake Entertainment. In February 2021, the completed film was reported to have received the new title Oxygen.

=== Filming ===
Principal photography began in July 2020.

== Release ==
Oxygen was released on Netflix on May 12, 2021.

== Reception ==
On the review aggregator website Rotten Tomatoes, 90% of 106 critics' reviews are positive, with an average rating of 6.8/10. The website's consensus reads: "Oxygen gets the white-knuckle maximum out of its claustrophobic setting, with director Alexandre Aja and star Mélanie Laurent making this a must-watch thriller for sci-fi fans." Metacritic, which uses a weighted average, assigned the film a score of 67 out of 100, based on 20 critics, indicating "generally favorable" reviews.

== See also ==
- Taphophobia, (from Greek τάφος meaning taphos, "grave, tomb" and φόβος meaning phobos, "fear") is an abnormal (psychopathological) phobia of being buried alive as a result of being incorrectly pronounced dead
- Anesthesia awareness, awareness under anesthesia, also referred to as intraoperative awareness or accidental awareness during general anesthesia (AAGA), is a rare complication of general anesthesia wherein patients regain varying levels of consciousness during their surgical procedures.
- Lazarus phenomenon, a syndrome of spontaneous return of circulation after failed attempts at resuscitation
