= The 9th Life of Louis Drax =

2016 film by Alexandre Aja

- Theatrical release poster
- Directed by: Alexandre Aja
- Screenplay by: Max Minghella
- Based on: The Ninth Life of Louis Drax by Liz Jensen
- Produced by: Alexandre Aja; Timothy Bricknell; Max Minghella; Shawn Williamson
- Starring: Jamie Dornan; Sarah Gadon; Aaron Paul; Aiden Longworth; Oliver Platt; Molly Parker; Julian Wadham; Jane McGregor; Barbara Hershey
- Cinematography: Maxime Alexandre
- Edited by: Baxter
- Music by: Patrick Watson
- Production companies: Summit Premiere; Miramax; Blank Tape; Brightlight Pictures; Fire Axe Pictures
- Distributed by: Lionsgate (United States); Soda Pictures (United Kingdom)
- Release dates: September 2, 2016 (United States); September 2, 2016 (United Kingdom)
- Running time: 108 minutes
- Countries: Canada; United States; United Kingdom
- Language: English
- Box office: $509,725

The 9th Life of Louis Drax is a 2016 supernatural thriller film directed by Alexandre Aja and starring Jamie Dornan, Sarah Gadon, Aiden Longworth, Oliver Platt, Molly Parker, Julian Wadham, Jane McGregor, Barbara Hershey, and Aaron Paul. It was written by Max Minghella based on Liz Jensen's best-selling 2004 novel of the same title.

The film was released in the United States and United Kingdom on September 2, 2016, by Summit Premiere and Soda Pictures.

== Plot ==
Louis Drax, a 9-year-old boy, narrates a series of near-fatal accidents, the most recent being a suspicious fall off a cliff. Through a series of flashbacks, Louis's sessions with psychiatrist Dr. Perez are shown. Additional flashbacks reveal a strained relationship between Louis's parents, Peter and Natalie. Despite Dr. Perez promising that everything Louis told him would be confidential, he tells Natalie about his concerns, causing her to end the sessions.

In the present, a doctor examining Louis after his latest accident pronounces him dead. After Louis is transported to the morgue, however, he suddenly awakes, and is placed in intensive care in a coma. Peter, who has disappeared, is immediately the primary suspect in the possible attempted murder of Louis. Louis's case attracts the attention of Dr. Allan Pascal, who becomes the lead doctor in charge of Louis's care. Despite Allan being married, he and Natalie share a mutual attraction, and he kisses her one day while the two go on a walk.

Natalie and Allan receive threatening letters telling them to stay away from each other, with the author of said letters claiming to be Louis himself. Dalton, the lead investigator on Louis's case, believes the letters to be written by Peter. Dalton warns Allan not to become involved with Natalie, telling him that Peter is not Louis's real father, and at one point Natalie attempted to give Louis up for adoption. Natalie confesses to Allan that Louis was the result of rape, and despite Dalton's warnings, she and Allan have sex.

Louis is visited in the hospital by his grandmother, Violet, who notices Allan and Natalie's relationship. She warns Allan that Natalie is unstable and manipulative. Dalton suddenly enters, informing Violet and Allan that Peter's body has been found at the bottom of a cliff, having been dead for several days.

While all of the above is happening, Louis continues to narrate. At certain points he is visited by a mysterious creature covered in seaweed. Louis visits the creature in a cave, and it is revealed to be Louis's manifestation of Peter, who was found dead in a cave covered in seaweed.

One day, while waking up from a nap, Allan is told by another doctor that not only did he sleepwalk during his nap, but he also wrote a prescription for Natalie, for dangerous doses of insulin and chloroform. This, combined with Allan's other dreams and the suspicious letters, leads Allan to believe that while he sleeps, Louis has somehow been controlling him and his actions. Allan informs Dr. Perez, who hooks Allan up to an EEG and manages to directly communicate with Louis via Allan's mind and voice.

Louis reveals what happened during the picnic: Natalie tries to give Louis some candy but refuses to allow Peter to have any, making Peter suspicious and leading to a fight. Louis flees to the cliff edge, while Natalie and Peter follow and get into a scuffle, which ends when Natalie pushes Peter off the cliff to his death. Louis sees this and walks off the edge of the cliff on his own in an apparent suicide attempt.

At this point, Louis's heartbeat suddenly stops and Allan wakes up. While Allan tries to revive him with a defibrillator, it is shown that Natalie is responsible for Louis's "accidents," having done things such as poison his candy, electrocute him while near a socket, and smother him with a pillow. Allan succeeds in restarting Louis's heart while Natalie looks on.

Some time later, Allan moves out after separating from his wife. He visits Natalie, who has been placed in a psychiatric ward under Dr. Perez's care. Perez explains to Allan that he has diagnosed Natalie with Munchausen syndrome by proxy. It is shown that Natalie is now pregnant, presumably with Allan's child.

In a final narration, Louis ponders whether being in a coma forever is bad, as it allows him to stay with his father. Peter's voice, however, tells Louis that the world is beautiful and he needs to grow up and live his life. Louis awakens from his coma, and the film ends.

== Cast ==
- Jamie Dornan as Dr. Allan Pascal
- Sarah Gadon as Natalie Drax
- Aaron Paul as Peter Drax
- Aiden Longworth as Louis Drax
- Oliver Platt as Dr. Perez
- Molly Parker as Dalton
- Julian Wadham as Dr. Janek
- Jane McGregor as Sophie
- Barbara Hershey as Violet

== Production ==
Anthony Minghella originally intended to adapt and direct a film adaptation of the novel, and secured the rights to it before it was published in 2004. Minghella died in 2008. In August 2014, it was announced that the film would move forward, with Anthony Minghella's son Max Minghella having adapted the novel into a screenplay, Jamie Dornan cast, Alexandre Aja directing, and Minghella and Tim Bricknell producing under their Antcolony Films banner. In September 2014, Aaron Paul, Sarah Gadon, Oliver Platt, Molly Parker, Barbara Hershey, and Aiden Longworth all joined the cast of the film.

== Release ==
In May 2016, Soda Pictures acquired UK distribution rights to the film. In June 2016, Summit Entertainment acquired distribution rights to the film and set the film for a limited September 2, 2016 release. The film was released in the United Kingdom on September 2, 2016.

== Reception ==
On Rotten Tomatoes, the film has a rating of 38%, based on 65 reviews, with an average rating of 5.15/10. The site's critical consensus reads, "The 9th Life of Louis Drax is intriguing and visually compelling, but its disparate parts are never truly woven into a satisfying whole." On Metacritic, the film holds a score of 41 out of 100, based on 20 reviews, indicating "mixed or average reviews".
