= Alan Jones (film critic) =

British film critic, broadcaster and reporter

- Born: United Kingdom
- Occupations: Writer and film critic
- Years active: 1977–present

Alan Jones is a film critic, broadcaster, and reporter primarily focused on movies in production, especially in the horror fantasy genre. His first assignment was on Star Wars in 1977, after which he became the London correspondent for Cinefantastique magazine from 1977 to 2002 and reviewed for the British magazine Starburst from 1980 until 2008. A film critic for Film Review and Radio Times, he has made contributions to the Radio Times Guide to Films, the Radio Times Guide to Science Fiction, and Halliwell's Film Guide. He has also been a film critic for BBC News 24, Front Row on BBC Radio 4, and Sky News programme Sunrise. He has worked for Empire, Première, and Total Film. An article of his in the latter coined the term for the Splat Pack.

== Famous connections ==
Jones was close friends with Sid Vicious and his memories of Vicious formed the basis of director Alex Cox's screenplay Sid and Nancy. He has spoken about the friendship in several TV and radio documentaries. Jones worked for designer Vivienne Westwood in her shop SEX. He was a DJ for the Sex Pistols, and played himself in the film The Great Rock 'n' Roll Swindle.

== TV work ==
Jones worked on Film4 documentaries about Italian horror directors Mario Bava and Dario Argento and Channel 4's The Top 100 British Box Office Hits. He was involved in the I Love the '70s BBC documentary series, talking about disco music and his arrest for wearing a punk T-shirt. He has made television appearances in Argentina, Colombia, Italy, Spain, Finland, and Russia.

== Festivals and film juries ==
As a co-presenter of London's Shock Around The Clock festival and the National Film Theatre's 'Fantasm', he conducted lectures for The Guardian with directors Freddie Francis and Dario Argento and hosted Q&A sessions with director Danny Boyle and the cast of Slumdog Millionaire. He presented 'Brit-Invaders' at the Science + Fiction Festival in Trieste and filmed interviews with Neil Marshall and Ray Harryhausen. Jones is an active member of the London Film Critics' Circle. He has served on juries at Sitges Film Festival (Spain), Fantasporto (Portugal), Festival du Film de Paris (France), Rome Film Festival (Italy), Science + Fiction (Italy), MotelX (Portugal), Lund (Sweden), Strasbourg European Fantastic Film Festival (France), and Avoriaz International Fantastic Film Festival (France). Jones is co-curator of the London FrightFest film festival. In 2022 Jones became the artistic director of the Trieste Science + Fiction Festival in Italy.

== Film appearances ==
Jones has acted in several movies, including Terror, The Great Rock 'n' Roll Swindle, and The Errand. He features in the documentary Video Nasties: Moral Panic, Censorship & Videotape and its sequel, directed by Jake West, and has appeared in numerous rock videos, including for 10cc, Duran Duran, and Robbie Williams.

== DVD commentaries ==
Jones' DVD commentaries include those for Alejandro Jodorowsky's Santa Sangre; Nicolas Winding Refn's Valhalla Rising, Bronson, and Fear X; Tom Shankland's WAZ; Andrew Birkin's Cement Garden; Tony Maylam's The Burning; Paul China's Crawl; Lucio Fulci's Zombie Flesh Eaters; and Dario Argento's The Bird with the Crystal Plumage, The Card Player, The Stendhal Syndrome, Tenebrae, and Suspiria. He also did a moderated commentary with Helen Mirren for Tinto Brass' Caligula. He has contributed to the DVD extras for the Arrow Films Mario Bava Collection and the Blu-ray releases of Heavenly Creatures, Demons, and the A Nightmare on Elm Street collection.

== Other projects ==
Jones worked with director Nicolas Winding Refn on the book The Act of Seeing, a volume of vintage posters charting the history of American exploitation films.

== Bibliography ==
=== Books (as author) ===
- Profondo Argento, Jones, Alan, FAB Press, London, 2004
- Dario Argento: the Man, the Myths, the Magic, Jones, Alan, FAB Press, London, 2012 (revised version of Profondo Argento)
- Saturday Night Forever: The Story of Disco, Jones, Alan and Kantonen, Jussi, Mainstream Publishing, Edinburgh, 2005
- The Rough Guide to Horror Movies,, Jones, Alan, Rough Guides, London, 2005
- Tomb Raider: The Official Companion, Jones, Alan, Carlton Publishing Group, London, 2001
- The FrightFest Fearbook. Jones, Alan, Revolver Books, London, 2006
- The FrightFest Guide to Exploitation Movies, FAB Press, 2016
- The FrightFest Guide to Grindhouse Movies, FAB Press, 2021
- Alan Jones: The Complete Starburst Reviews 1978-2008, FAB Press, 2024
- Discomania, FAB Press, 2025

=== Books (as contributor) ===
- The BFI Companion to Horror
- Shock Xpress Volume 1 & 2
- Brian De Palma Interviews
- Femmes Fatales
- Zombie
- Eyeball
- Shadows in Eden

== TV and radio contributions ==
- Final 24 (Episode: Sid Vicious)
- My Way: The Sid Vicious Story (BBC Radio 6 Music)
- Who Killed Nancy?
- Van Damme – The Muscles From Brussels (Channel 5)
- Hitchcock (Sci-Fi Channel)
- The Day Britain Turned Disco
- When Disco Ruled the World
- Punk Britannia (BBC Four, June 2012)
