= Into the Mirror =

- Theatrical Release Poster
- Directed by: Kim Sung-ho
- Written by: Kim Sung-ho
- Produced by: Kim Eun-young
- Starring: Yoo Ji-tae; Kim Hye-na; Kim Myung-min
- Cinematography: Jeong Han-cheol
- Edited by: Kim Sun-min
- Music by: Mun Dae-hyeon
- Distributed by: Cinema Service
- Release date: August 14, 2003
- Running time: 113 minutes
- Country: South Korea
- Language: Korean
- Budget: $3 million
- Box office: $70,277

Into the Mirror (Korean: 거울 속으로; RR: Geoul sogeuro) is a 2003 South Korean supernatural horror film about a series of grisly deaths in a department store, all involving mirrors, and the troubled detective who investigates them. It is the debut film of director Kim Sung-ho.

== Plot ==
After accidentally causing the death of his partner during a hostage situation, Wu Young-min quits the police force to work for his uncle as head security of Dreampia, an immense shopping center. Dreampia is currently in the rebuilding stages as a fire destroyed parts of it five years ago. The re-opening was scheduled in a few days, until some strange murders begin to occur in the building. It seems that the victims, all employees of the mall, have committed suicide in very gruesome and unconventional ways.

Young-min is very suspicious about the police explanation, and starts his own investigation, but unfortunately for him, an old acquaintance, Ha Hyun-su, is in charge of the police investigation. Hyun-su still blames Young-min for the death of their friend and is not interested in cooperation. The more clues they stumble on, the more strange and unnatural the truth becomes.

== Cast ==
- Yoo Ji-tae as Wu Young-min
- Kim Hye-na as Lee Ji-hyun
- Kim Myung-min as Ha Hyun-su

== Reception ==
Derek Elley of Variety described Into the Mirror as an "Intermittently effective tale of a burned-out ex-cop who's drawn into a series of supernatural murders too often resorts to corny genre moments."

== Remake ==
An American remake was produced in 2008, titled Mirrors.

Into the Mirror was released on the flip side of the unrated version of the Mirrors 2 DVD.
