= Mirrors (2008 film) =

- Theatrical release poster
- Directed by: Alexandre Aja
- Screenplay by: Alexandre Aja; Grégory Levasseur
- Based on: Into the Mirror by Kim Sung-ho
- Produced by: Alexandra Milchan; Marc Sternberg; Grégory Levasseur
- Starring: Kiefer Sutherland; Paula Patton; Amy Smart
- Cinematography: Maxime Alexandre
- Edited by: Baxter
- Music by: Javier Navarrete
- Production companies: Regency Enterprises; New Regency; Luna Pictures; ASAF; Castel Film Romania
- Distributed by: 20th Century Fox (Overseas) (Note: Trailer credited as ht02 yrutneC xoF due to mirroring video effect); Kinowelt Filmverleih (Germany); Odeon Cineplex (Romania)
- Release date: August 15, 2008
- Running time: 111 minutes
- Countries: United States; Romania; Germany
- Language: English
- Budget: $35 million
- Box office: $78.1 million

Mirrors is a 2008 supernatural horror film directed by Alexandre Aja, starring Kiefer Sutherland, Paula Patton, and Amy Smart. The film was first titled Into the Mirror, but the name was later changed to Mirrors. Filming began on May 1, 2007, and it was released in American theaters on August 15, 2008. The film is an international co-production between the United States, Romania and Germany.

The film was originally scripted as a straightforward remake of the 2003 South Korean horror film Into the Mirror. However, once Aja was brought on board and read the script, he was dissatisfied with the particulars of the original film's story. He decided to retain the original film's basic idea involving mirrors, and to incorporate a few of its scenes, but otherwise crafted a new story and script for his version of the movie. A stand-alone sequel not featuring the original cast and crew, titled Mirrors 2, was released in 2010.

== Plot ==
A security guard runs through a subway station until he enters a room he cannot escape. He starts begging his reflection in a mirror for his life. His reflection cuts its own throat with a glass shard; the wound reflects upon the real security guard's body, killing him.

Ben Carson, a suspended police detective, begins his first day as a night security guard at the Mayflower, a luxury department store gutted by a fire and shuttered five years prior. The building still contains numerous mirrors from the store.

After several nights, Ben notices unusual and increasingly unsettling things about the mirrors. He soon finds the wallet of the previous night guard (who died in the beginning of the film) and a note that says "Esseker". Ben eventually comes to suspect that the mirror reflections make things happen to people.

Meanwhile, Ben's sister, Angie, is killed by her reflection as it slowly tears off its lower jaw, causing her to bleed to death. Distraught and enraged by her death, he attempts to destroy the mirrors at the Mayflower, but they are impervious to damage. He demands to know what the mirrors want, and cracks appear on one of the mirrors, spelling out the word "ESSEKER".

Failing to find "Esseker," Ben searches for Terrence Berry, the security guard who started the fire at the Mayflower 5 years prior. He goes to the mental institute where Terrence was incarcerated prior to his death. In a video, Terrence blames the mirrors for his family's death after he failed to find Esseker.

Realizing his family is in danger, Ben races to his ex-wife's home and gets rid of the mirrors, painting over those he cannot. His ex-wife Amy, disturbed by his behavior, threatens to call the police - which will ensure that Ben will not see his kids again. Ben shoots a mirror in an attempt to prove to her they cannot be damaged. However, the mirror remains broken, and upon seeing his kids' terrified faces, Ben leaves.

Ben investigates the Mayflower's basement and uncovers a room with a chair surrounded by mirrors, a psychomanteum. Realizing that the Mayflower was built on the site of an earlier hospital, Ben eventually finds out about Anna Esseker, a patient of the psychiatric hospital. She was 12 when she supposedly died in a mass suicide.

Finding a record of Anna being discharged from the hospital two days before the suicide, Ben is led to believe she is still alive. Meanwhile, Amy notices her son, Michael's reflection acting differently from her real son. She calls Ben, who immediately returns home. Together they cover or remove everything with a reflective surface.

Visiting Anna Esseker's childhood home, Ben learns she was violent, uncontrollable, and diagnosed with severe schizophrenia. At St. Matthew's Hospital, Dr. Kane's treatment was to confine Anna to a chair surrounded by mirrors. Anna's brother Robert recalls that when she returned, apparently cured, strange things started to happen with the mirrors in their home. As a result, her family sent her to a convent, Saint Augustine's Monastery, where mirrors are forbidden.

At the convent, Ben finds Anna alive and well. Anna explains that she was possessed by a demon, which later became trapped in the mirrors. The demon collects the souls of those it kills. If she returns, the demon would be able to escape into the mortal world. She refuses to go back.

Meanwhile, Amy discovers that Michael is missing, and the floor is covered by water. Putting her daughter Daisy in a safe closet, she finds Michael scraping the paint from the mirrors. Amy tries to stop him, but he escapes, having been possessed.

Threatening Anna with a gun, Ben forcefully brings her to the Mayflower and straps her into the chair in the psychomanteum. Michael is pulled through the water on the floor by his reflection, and begins to drown. At the Mayflower, all the mirrors explode as the demon repossesses Anna, sparing Michael. The possessed Anna attacks Ben, who manages to kill her by igniting a nearby gas line, setting off a huge explosion. The old building collapses violently, trapping Ben.

Ben pulls himself out of the rubble and stumbles out of the building. He sees police and firemen, and a body is brought out in a bag by paramedics, but nobody notices him. After noticing everything is reversed, Ben realizes he died in the rubble and is now trapped in the mirror world.

== Cast ==
- Kiefer Sutherland as Ben Carson
- Paula Patton as Amy Carson
- Amy Smart as Angela "Angie" Carson
- Cameron Boyce as Michael "Mikey" Carson
- Arika Gluck as Daisy Carson
- Mary Beth Peil as Anna Esseker
- Darren Kent as Jimmy Esseker
- John Shrapnel as Lorenzo Sapelli
- Jason Flemyng as Detective Larry Byrne
- Tim Ahern as Dr. Morris
- Julian Glover as Robert Esseker
- Josh Cole as Gary Lewis
- Ezra Buzzington as Terrence Berry
- Aida Doina as Rosá

== Production ==
The movie began development in 2005 under the working title Into the Mirror with music video director Sanji Senaka in talks to direct the movie. The screenplay was initially written by Joe Gangemi and Jim Uhls, with rewrites by Michele and Kieran Mulroney. After Alexandre Aja signed on to direct, he brought on his partner Grégory Levasseur to completely rework the script. Filming began in fall of 2006 and was filmed mostly in the Romanian Academy of Sciences building in Bucharest.

== Music ==
Javier Navarrete used a prior existing work of classical music, "Asturias" by Isaac Albéniz, as the film's main theme.

== Reception ==
=== Box office ===
In the United States, Mirrors opened in fourth position making $11.1 million. On its second weekend, it ranked at seventh position, making a further $5 million. The film made a total of $30 million in the United States. In foreign cinemas the film stayed in the top five for its opening weekend in several countries including France, Mexico and United Kingdom, where it consistently ranked #2. It topped in the Hong Kong box office with $228,481 and stayed at the third place in Philippines and Spain. In South Korea and Russia it took #4 at the box office in its opening weekend. The film grossed $72,436,439 worldwide, including $41,745,000 from foreign cinemas.

=== Home media ===
The film grossed $10.6 million in home sales.

=== Critical response ===
On the review aggregator website Rotten Tomatoes, 15% of 88 critics' reviews are positive. The website's consensus reads: "Inconsistency and listless plot make this horror remake a less-than-frightening time at the movies." Metacritic, which uses a weighted average, assigned the film a score of 35 out of 100, based on 13 critics, indicating "generally unfavorable" reviews. Audiences polled by CinemaScore gave the film an average grade of "C" on an A+ to F scale.

== Sequel ==
On October 8, 2009, director Victor Garcia announced that he would begin to shoot a sequel, which would be released direct-to-DVD by 20th Century Fox. The sequel was released on October 19, 2010. None of the original cast and crew were involved.
