= Grégory Levasseur =

French screenwriter and film producer (born 1979)

Grégory Levasseur (born 1979 in Douarnenez, France) is a French screenwriter and film producer, best known for The Hills Have Eyes (2006), High Tension (2003), Maniac (2012) Piranha 3-D (2010), Mirrors (2008), P2 (2007), and Furia (1999), all of which he collaborated on with Alexandre Aja. The Pyramid (2014) was Levasseur's directorial debut.

== Filmography ==
Year	Title	Other names	Role			Notes
Year	Title	Other names	Screenwriter	Director	Producer	Notes
1997	Over the Rainbow				Yes	Short film Art director
1999	Furia		Yes			Co-written with Alexandre Aja
2002	Entre chiens et loups (Break of Dawn)		Yes			Directed by Alexandre Arcady; Co-written with Alexandre Aja, second unit director
2003	High Tension	Haute tension	Yes			Co-written with Alexandre Aja, Art director
2006	The Hills Have Eyes	La Colline a des yeux	Yes			Co-written with Alexandre Aja, second unit director, Art director
2007	P2		Yes		Yes	Directed by Franck Khalfoun; Co-written with Franck Khalfoun and Alexandre Aja
2008	Mirrors		Yes		Yes	Co-written with Alexandre Aja, producer, second unit director
2009	The Esseker File		Yes		Yes	Co-written with Alexandre Aja
2010	Piranha 3-D		Yes		Yes	Co-written with Alexandre Aja
2012	Maniac		Yes			
2014	The Pyramid	Site 146		Yes		Feature Directorial Debut
2019	Crawl				Yes	Executive producer
2021	Oxygen				Yes	
