= High Tension =

2003 French slasher film

- Theatrical release poster
- French: Haute tension
- Directed by: Alexandre Aja
- Written by: Alexandre Aja; Grégory Levasseur
- Produced by: Alexandre Arcady; Robert Benmussa
- Starring: Cécile de France; Maïwenn; Philippe Nahon
- Cinematography: Maxime Alexandre
- Edited by: Baxter
- Music by: François Eudes
- Production companies: Alexandre Films; EuropaCorp
- Distributed by: EuropaCorp Distribution
- Release date: 18 June 2003 (France)
- Running time: 95 minutes
- Country: France
- Language: French
- Budget: $2.5 million
- Box office: $6.8 million

High Tension (French: Haute tension, French pronunciation: [ot tɑ̃sjɔ̃]; also known as Switchblade Romance in some English-speaking countries) is a 2003 French slasher film directed by Alexandre Aja, co-written with Grégory Levasseur, and starring Cécile de France and Maïwenn. The plot focuses on a young student who travels with her classmate to visit her family at their secluded farmhouse, where a murderer breaks in on the night of their arrival.

High Tension was theatrically released in France on 18 June 2003, and was screened at the 2003 Toronto International Film Festival as part of the "Midnight Madness" section, where it was acquired by Lionsgate Films. After being re-dubbed in English and re-edited to secure an R-rating, Lionsgate then spent $14 million for a wide release in the United States on 10 June 2005, where it ultimately grossed only $3.6 million. It received mixed reviews from critics.

The film has been cited as being associated with the New Extremity movement.

== Plot ==
Best friends Marie and Alex are on their way to stay at Alex's parents' house for the weekend to study. Upon arriving, Alex gives Marie a tour of her house, then they have dinner and go to bed. While the family sleeps, Marie stays awake in the guest bedroom, listening to music and masturbating. Marie hears a doorbell ring and Alex's father Daniel answers it. A man slashes Daniel's face with a straight razor, presses him between two staircase spindles, and shoves a bookcase towards his head, decapitating him. Alex's mother, awakened by the noise, finds Daniel dead and is approached by the killer.

Marie, hearing the mother's screams, rearranges the guest bedroom to conceal her presence, and hides under her bed. The killer inspects Marie's room but does not find her. Marie creeps downstairs and finds Alex chained in her bedroom. Promising to find help, Marie sneaks into the parents' room to find a phone. After hearing loud thuds, she hides in the closet and witnesses the killer murdering Alex's mother by slashing her throat with a razor. Alex's younger brother Tom runs from the house to the cornfield, pursued by the killer. Marie returns to Alex, where she witnesses Tom's murder from a window. Marie promises to free Alex, but the killer is heard returning. Marie sneaks into the kitchen and takes a butcher knife. Alex is dragged into the killer's truck while Marie sneaks into it and hides there with Alex. He locks them in and drives off.

When the killer stops at a gas station, Marie gives Alex the knife and sneaks in for help. Inside, Marie witnesses the store clerk being murdered with an axe. As the killer drives away, Marie calls the police but hangs up when she's unable to tell them where she is. Marie takes the clerk's keys and uses his car to follow the killer down a deserted road. Noticing Marie tailing him, the killer rams Marie's vehicle, pushing the car off the road. Badly injured, Marie runs into the forest as the killer seeks her. Eventually, Marie bludgeons the killer with a fence post covered in barbed wire. As Marie inspects the body, he grabs at her throat, so Marie suffocates him with a plastic sheet. As Marie makes her way back to the truck, Alex seems terrified of her. Meanwhile, police at the gas station watch security camera footage, which shows Marie murdering the store clerk. It is revealed that Marie is murderous, delusional, and obsessed with Alex, being responsible for all the murders.

At the truck, Marie unties Alex. As soon as Alex is free, she threatens Marie with the knife and accuses her of butchering her family. Alex slashes Marie's face and stabs her in the stomach before running into the forest. Marie chases Alex with a concrete saw. Alex finds a road and flags down a car. As Alex is climbing into the car, Marie appears brandishing the concrete saw and disembowels the driver. A stray piece of glass slices Alex's Achilles tendon. Alex takes a crowbar from the car's toolbox and crawls along the road. Marie forces Alex to tell her that she loves her, and she kisses her. While engaged in the kiss, Alex plunges the crowbar into Marie's upper-chest as Marie proclaims she'll never let anyone come between them.

Sometime later, Marie is in a psychiatric hospital room chained to her bed, with Alex watching her through a one-way mirror. Marie grins and reaches for Alex, seemingly aware that she is behind it.

== Cast ==
- Cécile de France as Marie
- Maïwenn as Alexia Soral
- Philippe Nahon as The Killer
- Andrei Finti as Daniel Soral, Alex's father
- Oana Pellea as Mrs. Soral, Alex's mother
- Franck Khalfoun as Jimmy
- Marco Claudiu Pascu as Tom Soral, Alex's little brother

== Production ==
Director Alexandre Aja and co-writer Grégory Levasseur, who had known each other since secondary school, sought to make a horror film in the tradition of The Evil Dead (1981), The Texas Chain Saw Massacre (1974), The Shining (1980), Maniac (1980) and Halloween (1978). Aja explained that he wanted to return to a more direct survival-horror experience. Philippe Nahon was cast as the killer after Aja saw his performance in Gaspar Noé's I Stand Alone (1998). Nahon initially reluctant to play another dark character, but Aja persuaded him to accept the role.

Filming took place in Romania, including at MediaPro Studios outside Bucharest. The production involved physically demanding night shoots in freezing conditions, with Cécile de France and Maïwenn frequently performing barefoot and wearing pyjamas. Cécile de France underwent physical preparation for the role, including Muay Thai, weight training and endurance work, in preparation for the demanding winter shoot.

== Release ==
High Tension was released in France on 18 June 2003 where it was distributed by EuropaCorp.

The film was shown at the 2003 Toronto International Film Festival during the Midnight Madness section. After screening at the festival, the film was purchased by Lionsgate Films for North American distribution. In her book Films of the New French Extremity, Alexandra West described The screening of High Tension at Midnight Madness made that section of the film festival an "unintentional bastion for New French Extremity", which still did not have a popular following. Following High Tensions's release there, other films followed at the festival such as Calvaire (2004), Sheitan (2006) and Frontier(s) and Inside (2007) and Martyrs (2008).

The film was subsequently released in Belgium on 8 October 2003, distributed by Belga Films. In the United Kingdom, the film was shown at the Cambridge Film Festival on 10 July 2004 under the alternate title Switchblade Romance, receiving wide distribution there under this title on 24 September 2004.

In the United States, Lionsgate released an English-dubbed version of the film in 1,323 theaters on 10 June 2005 (with $14 million marketing cost). Several murder scenes were truncated in order to avoid an NC-17 rating. A re-cut theatrical trailer was released by Lionsgate to promote the film, featuring "Superstar" by Sonic Youth.

=== Censorship ===
Some scenes were edited for the American version to achieve an R rating by the MPAA. About one minute of the film was cut in order to avoid the NC-17 rating. The R-rated edition was released in American cinemas, in a less widely circulated fullscreen DVD, and on streaming services. This section notes what was deleted from the unrated, original French film to produce the American version.

- Alex's father is graphically decapitated with a bookcase, his headless neck spraying blood. In the R-rated version, the murder is edited to quickly cut away as the bookcase crushes and severs his head. Later the body is seen on the staircase without the head.
- When Alex's mother has her throat slashed, the scene is shortened; most of the arterial spurting, as the killer pulls back her head, is gone. Subsequent shots of Marie inspecting the body have also been edited.
- The death of Jimmy the gas station clerk has been shortened. Close-up shots of the axe sticking in his chest have been removed.
- The scene where Marie strikes the killer's face with the barbed wire pole is shortened and less explicit; Marie hits the killer fewer times, and fewer details of the killer's wounds are shown.
- The driver's disembowelment with the concrete saw was shortened.
- A close-up of the crowbar in Marie's shoulder is missing.

=== Home media ===
In France, the film was released in 2004 as a two-disc DVD with behind-the-scenes footage and interviews. A 4K restoration UHD Blu-ray was released in 2024, which included the extra content from the 2004 DVD. The 2024 release also included a documentary on the "New Wave of French horror" and interviews with the cast and crew.

In the United Kingdom, the film was released on DVD on 31 January 2005 under the name Switchblade Romance. The DVD came with UK-exclusive commentary by director Alexandre Aja, Cécile de France and Jamie Graham; a making-of documentary, interviews with cast and crew, and a trailer. On 22 January 2024, distributor Second Sight Films released High Tension on Blu-ray and 4K UHD Blu-ray. The 4K edition featured an HDR10+ presentation created by Second Sight Films and approved by director Alexandre Aja, alongside new audio commentary and interviews with members of the production team.

In North America, Lionsgate released the film on DVD on 11 October 2005 in its uncut form, featuring the original French soundtrack and two versions of the English-language dub. A Blu-ray edition was released by Lionsgate on 5 October 2020. On 12 August 2025, Lionsgate released the film on 4K UHD Blu-ray in the United States as a SteelBook edition. The release used Second Sight Films' director-approved HDR10+ presentation and included new and archival special features.

In Australia, the film was released on DVD in February 2006 and Blu-ray in March 2015. In Italy, the film was released on DVD in 2006 with an Italian dub, trailer and behind-the-scenes footage and interviews. In Japan, the film was released on DVD in 2007 and Blu-ray in 2026, with the latter having Japanese subtitles, making-of material and interviews. In Spain, a Blu-ray was released in 2016 with French and Spanish audio available, as well as English and Spanish subtitles. In Germany, a 4K UHD SteelBook was released in 2025 with French and German language options available. It also came with interviews and a documentary called Beyond Blood.

== Reception ==
=== Box office ===
In France, the film attracted 110,544 admissions, including 93,308 during its opening week. High Tension grossed $2,610,892 in Europe and other international markets. In North America, it grossed $3.2 million against Lionsgate's $14 million distribution cost and marketing campaign. Its worldwide gross totaled $6,291,958.

=== Critical response ===
On the review aggregator website Rotten Tomatoes, 41% of 130 critics' reviews are positive, with an average rating of 5.3/10. The website's consensus reads: "There is indeed a good amount of tension in this French slasher, but the dubbing is bad and the end twist unbelievable." Metacritic, which uses a weighted average, assigned the film a score of 42 out of 100, based on 30 critics, indicating "mixed or average" reviews. Audiences polled by CinemaScore gave the film an average grade of "C−" on an A+ to F scale.

American film critic Roger Ebert awarded the film only one star, opening his review: "The philosopher Thomas Hobbes tells us life can be 'poor, nasty, brutish and short.' So is this movie." He added that the film had a plot hole "that is not only large enough to drive a truck through, but in fact does have a truck driven right through it."

Lisa Nesselson of Variety was more forgiving, saying that the film "deftly juggles gore and suspense", has "unnerving sound design", and "has a sinister, haemoglobin look that fits the story like a glove". James Berardinelli praised the film, writing: "The film revels in blood and gore, but this is not just a run-of-the-mill splatter film. There's a lot of intelligence in both the script and in Alexandre Aja's direction ... For those who enjoy horror films and don't mind copious quantities of red-dyed fluids, this one is not to be missed. It's a triumph of the Grand Guignol."

The Village Voice's Mark Holcomb wrote that the film resembles "a pastiche of '70s American slasher flicks that seemingly stands to add to the worldwide glut of irono-nostalgic sequels, remakes, and retreads," ultimately seeing it a "gratifyingly gory, doggedly intellectual decon of the likes of The Texas Chainsaw Massacre, Halloween and (surprisingly but aptly) Duel." M. E. Russell of The Oregonian awarded the film a B− rating, describing the film as "derivative, yes, but also stripped down and nasty, anchored by a heroine as relentless as the script." Russell also noted that the film features parallels and references to a number of other horror and thriller films, citing Road Games (1981), Duel (1971), and The Texas Chain Saw Massacre (1974).

In 2013 GamesRadar+ named the killer one of the "50 Creepiest Movie Psychopaths".

=== Accolades ===
At the 2003 Sitges Film Festival, Alexandre Aja won Best Director, Cécile de France won Best Actress and Giannetto De Rossi won Best Makeup for their work on High Tension. The film also received the Méliès d'Argent for Best Feature Film.

== Controversy ==
The film was included in Time magazine's 2010 list of the "10 most ridiculously violent films".

Several viewers of the film noticed striking similarities between the plot of the film and the plot of Dean Koontz's novel Intensity. When questioned at the Sundance Festival in 2004, the director acknowledged that he had read the novel and was aware of the similarities. On his website, Koontz stated that he was aware of the comparison but would not sue "because he found the film so puerile, so disgusting, and so intellectually bankrupt that he didn’t want the association with it that would inevitably come if he pursued an action against the filmmaker."

== Legacy ==
High Tension has been regarded as an important film in the international emergence of contemporary French horror and the New French Extremity movement. Film scholar Reece Goodall wrote that, although the film was largely dismissed by French critics on its original release, its success with international audiences helped initiate a wave of foreign interest in French horror. Retrospective commentary has also identified the film as one of the earliest works to combine the conventions of the slasher film with the violent aesthetic associated with New French Extremity.

The film was also a breakthrough for director Alexandre Aja. Goodall credited its international acclaim with enabling Aja to relocate to the United States and begin directing Hollywood genre films. The British Film Institute has similarly described High Tension as Aja's breakout French film and as a precursor to his subsequent American horror work.

== Soundtrack ==
- Muse — "New Born"
- Ricchi e Poveri — "Sarà perché ti amo"
- U-Roy — "Runaway Girl"
- Félix Gray and Didier Barbelivien — "A toutes les filles"
- François Eudes-Chanfrault — "Faustina Mauricio Mercedes"
- Scott Nickoley, Jamie Dunlap, Molly Pasutti, and Marc Ferrari — "I Believe"
- François Eudes-Chanfrault — "Celebration A2"
- Arch Bacon — "Pillow Talk"
- François Eudes-Chanfrault — "Paris—Nice"
- François Eudes-Chanfrault — "Out of the Mundial"

== Reference in other media ==
- New York-based Horrorcore artist Corey Jennings aka Kardiac paid homage to High Tension in the music video to his single "The Country Road Cover Up".

== See also ==
- Intensity, 1997 TV mini-series based on the 1995 novel by Dean Koontz that bears similarities to High Tension
- List of films featuring home invasions

== Sources ==
- West, Alexandra (2016). Films of the New French Extremity: Visceral Horror and National Identity. McFarland. ISBN 9781476625119.
