= Nethery =

Nethery is a surname. Notable people with the surname include:

- Lance Nethery (born 1957), Canadian ice hockey player and coach
- Miriam Byrd-Nethery (1929–2003), American actress
