= Vic (film) =

2006 short film by Sage Stallone

- Directed by: Sage Stallone
- Screenplay by: Will Huston
- Story by: Sage Stallone
- Produced by: Sage Stallone; Will Huston; Diana Thomas
- Starring: Clu Gulager; Carol Lynley; John Phillip Law; Gregory Sierra; Robert F. Lyons; Peter Mark Richman
- Cinematography: John Gulager
- Edited by: John Gulager; Bob Murawski; Paul Hart
- Music by: Franco Micalizzi
- Production company: Moonblood Pictures
- Distributed by: Grindhouse Releasing
- Release date: January 1, 2006
- Running time: 30 minutes
- Country: United States
- Language: English

Vic is a 2006 American short film drama. It is the directorial debut of Sage Stallone. The film stars Clu Gulager, Tom Gulager and Miriam Byrd-Nethery with cameos by Carol Lynley, John LaZar, and John Phillip Law. Stallone won the 2006 Boston Film Festival “Best New Filmmaker” award for the film. The film had its world premiere at the 2006 Palm Springs International Festival of Short Films, where the cast and filmmakers were in attendance.

== Premise ==
Clu Gulager plays a "down-on-his-luck" actor who gets a mysterious phone call. Haunted by memories of his former glory days, Vic struggles for a Hollywood comeback.

== Cast ==
- Clu Gulager as Vic Reeves
- Miriam Byrd-Nethery as Mary Kay
- Carol Lynley as Carrie Lee
- Gregory Sierra as Charlie
- John Phillip Law as John Shelbourne
- John LaZar as Ron Barzel
- Diane Ayala Goldner as Cashier
- Peter Mark Richman as Paul Marcus
- Richard Herd as Richard Hanson
- Sage Stallone as Doc
- Robert Jayne as Vic's driver
- Robert F. Lyons as Skip Hurtado

== Production ==
The film was shot on location in Los Angeles, California. Cinematographer John Gulager, best known for being a participant in Project Greenlight and the director of the Feast films, used a 35mm Panavision camera and lenses shooting in the 1.85:1 aspect ratio. The 35 mm film was processed at Technicolor lab in Hollywood. The film's score was composed by Franco Micalizzi, famous for some of Italian cinema's most memorable scores of the 1970s and 1980s.
