= Jenny Wade =

American actress (born 1980)

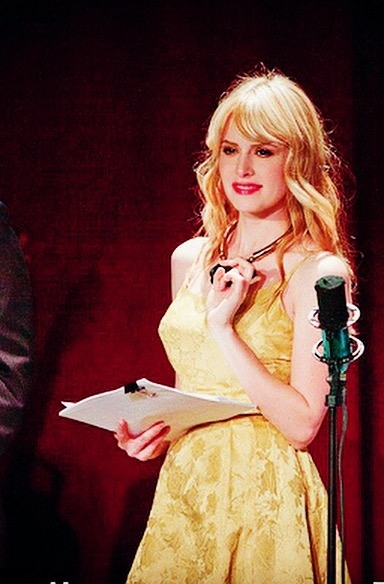
- Wade in 2017
- Born: Jennifer Wade; October 6, 1980 (age 46); Eugene, Oregon, U.S.
- Occupation: Actress
- Years active: 1999–2019
- Spouse: Robert Buckley (m. 2018)
- Children: 2

Jennifer Wade (born October 6, 1980) is an American actress known for playing Liz Traynor on the Fox television series The Good Guys, Nina in The CW television series Reaper, and Honey Pie in the Feast film trilogy.

== Life and career ==
Wade was born in Eugene, Oregon. She moved to Los Angeles to pursue her acting career in 1998.

In 1999, she debuted on television in the MTV anthology series Undressed. After Neil LaBute recruited her to star opposite Aaron Eckhart in his 10-minute film Tumble, the filmmaker offered her an uncredited role in his 2000 comedy film, Nurse Betty, starring Renée Zellweger. Following her film debut, Wade returned to television, guest starring in an October 2000 episode of the syndicated nonfiction TV program Arrest & Trial and in a January 2003 episode of the comedy series 8 Simple Rules for Dating My Teenage Daughter. She was also cast in the 2003 ABC pilot Naked Hotel starring John Corbett, which was not picked up to series; Wade played the assistant manager at the fictional Hotel de Bleu, a Bahamas hideaway.

Wade returned to the film in 2005, playing Jane Fonda's young replacement in Robert Luketic's romantic comedy film Monster-in-Law, which co-starred Jennifer Lopez and Michael Vartan. That same year, Wade appeared in several other films: Wes Craven's drama/thriller Red Eye with Rachel McAdams, Harold Ramis's neo-noir/comedy-drama The Ice Harvest, and the Rob Reiner comedy Rumor Has It with Jennifer Aniston, Kevin Costner, and Shirley MacLaine. Also in 2005 Wade appeared in John Gulager's horror film Feast, which received a limited theatrical release in the United States in September 2006, playing the role of waitress Honey Pie. Wade reprised her role as Honey Pie in the second film and a cameo in the third film.

In 2006, Wade co-starred with John Patrick Amedori, Lizzy Caplan and Daryl Hannah in Elliott Lester's teen drama, Love Is the Drug, playing the role of "haughty" private school student Erin. In 2007, she played the role of sous-chef Leah in No Reservations, Scott Hicks’s remake of the German comedy Mostly Martha, starring Catherine Zeta-Jones and Aaron Eckhart. In 2009 Wade appeared in the film The Strip playing the role of "free-spirited" Melissa.

In 2009, Wade joined the cast of The CW comedy series Reaper playing the recurring role of the demon Nina. Earlier the same year she was cast on Body Politic, a well-received CW pilot that was not picked up to series, playing the part of Ruby, "an idealistic young staffer".

In 2010, she was cast as Assistant District Attorney Liz Traynor on the short-lived Fox buddy-cop series The Good Guys (originally titled Jack and Dan) alongside Colin Hanks and Bradley Whitford. In 2011, Wade was cast on the 2012–13 TBS comedy series Wedding Band, playing the role of Rachel the love interest of Brian Austin Green's character.

== Personal life ==
Wade married actor Robert Buckley in May 2018. They have two children together.

== Filmography ==
=== Film ===
Year	Title	Role	Notes
2000	Nurse Betty	Diner Waitress	Uncredited
2005	Monster-in-Law	Viola's Young Replacement	
2005	Red Eye	Coffee Shop Girl	
2005	The Ice Harvest	Cupcake	Uncredited
2005	Feast	Honey Pie	
2005	Rumor Has It	Nikki	
2006	Love Is the Drug	Erin Sutherland	
2007	No Reservations	Leah	
2008	Feast II: Sloppy Seconds	Honey Pie	
2009	The Strip	Melissa	
2009	Feast III: The Happy Finish	Honey Pie	Cameo
2009	Brothers	Tina	
2014	Break Point	Vanessa	

=== Television ===
Year	Title	Role	Notes
1999	Undressed	TBA	[unknown episodes]
2000	Arrest & Trial	Christina	1 episode
2003	8 Simple Rules	Helga	Episode: "Come and Knock on Our Door"
2003	Naked Hotel	TBA	Unsold television pilot
2007	CSI: NY	Fern Lazlow	Episode: "Commuted Sentences"
2007	Pushing Daisies	Hallie Hundin	Episode: "Bitches"
2009	Body Politic	Ruby Cooke	Unsold television pilot
2009	Reaper	Nina	Recurring role, 11 episodes
2010	The Good Guys	Liz Traynor	Main role, 20 episodes
2012	American Horror Story	Prostitute	Episode: "Tricks and Treats"
2012–13	Wedding Band	Rachel	Main role, 10 episodes
2013	Grimm	Casey	Episode: "Mr. Sandman"
2014	Mad Men	Amy	Episode: "The Runaways"
2015	Hand of God	Heather Caldwell	Episode: "Your Inside Voice"
2016	Below the Surface	Cameron	Television film
