= Patrick Melton =

American dramatist

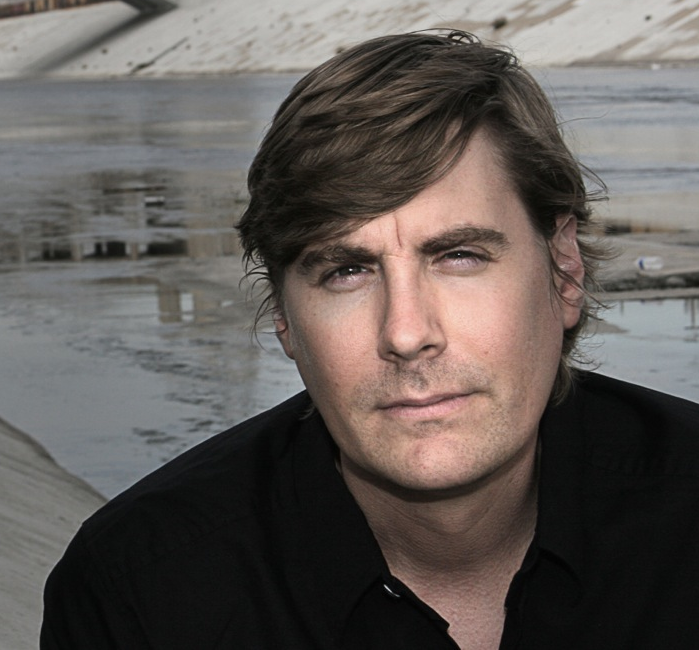
- Born: Champaign, Illinois, United States
- Occupations: Screenwriter; Producer; Novelist
- Years active: 2004–present

Patrick Melton is an American screenwriter, producer and novelist.

== Film career ==
In 2004, Melton won the third season of Project Greenlight, along with Marcus Dunstan and John Gulager. The television show premiered on Bravo and resulted in the horror/comedy film Feast and two sequels followed, Feast II: Sloppy Seconds and Feast III: The Happy Finish. However, it was Melton's involvement with the Saw series, that brought him worldwide recognition and international box office success. He wrote Saw IV, Saw V, Saw VI, and Saw 3D for a worldwide take of nearly $500,000,000. Additionally, Melton wrote the home invasion thriller The Collector, which was directed by Dunstan.

Melton and Dunstan adapted the graphic novel Smoke and Guns by Kirsten Baldock and Fabio Moon.

In the fall of 2006, Dimension Films preemptively acquired a dark and edgy horror/thriller spec script from Melton and Dunstan titled The Neighbor for a six-figures.

Additionally, the writing team of Melton and Dunstan have performed writing duties on Lionsgate's My Bloody Valentine 3D, Piranha 3D by Alexandre Aja, a remake of Clive Barker's Hellraiser, a remake of William Castle's classic horror film The Tingler at Columbia Pictures for producer Neal Moritz, a remake of Scanners by David Cronenberg, a film adaptation of the classic sci-fi TV anthology The Outer Limits for MGM, and the action/adventure tentpole Pacific Rim by Guillermo del Toro for Legendary Pictures and Warner Bros.

The sequel to Melton and Dunstan's horror film The Collector, titled The Collection, and again directed by Dunstan, started filming in Atlanta, GA during the spring of 2011. It was theatrically released in 2012.

In November 2011, it was announced that Melton's debut horror/thriller novel, Black Light, would be adapted into a film with producer Michael De Luca.

In December 2011, Melton sold a sci-fi pitch titled Rise to Warner Bros. along with his writing partner Marcus Dunstan. David Karlak was attached to direct and Roy Lee was attached to produce.

In July 2012, The Hollywood Reporter reported that Melton and Dunstan were hired to adapt the God of War film.

In September 2012, Deadline Hollywood reported that Melton and Dunstan were hired to rewrite the fantasy project Waterproof for Legendary Pictures.

In June 2013, Melton sold a sci-fi pitch titled Outliers to 20th Century Fox along with his writing partner Marcus Dunstan. David Karlak is attached to direct and Peter Chernin is attached to produce. In 2015 they co-wrote a screenplay for the 11th Halloween installment, titled Halloween Returns which was originally planned with a release in 2015 under the direction of Dunstan.

In October 2016, Melton, along with partner Dunstan, were selected to write for the adaptation of Brandon Sanderson's The Way of Kings.

== Filmography ==
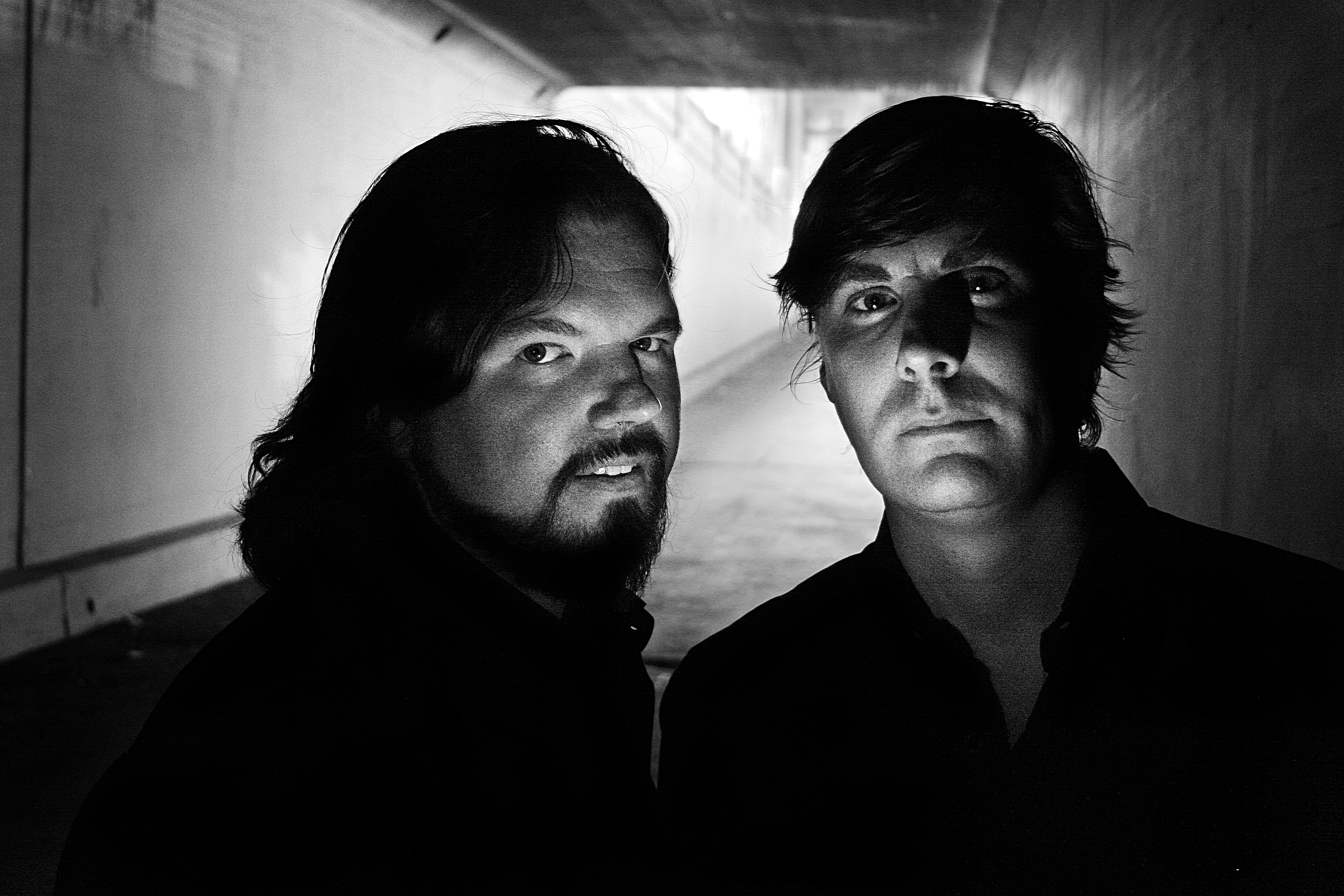
Marcus Dunstan & Patrick Melton

=== Film ===
Year	Title	Writer	Producer	Notes
2005	Feast	Yes	No	
2007	Saw IV	Yes	No	
2008	Feast II: Sloppy Seconds	Yes	No	
2008	Saw V	Yes	No	
2009	Feast III: The Happy Finish	Yes	No	
2009	The Collector	Yes	No	
2009	Saw VI	Yes	No	
2010	Saw 3D	Yes	No	
2010	The Candidate	Yes	Yes	Short film
2012	Piranha 3DD	Yes	No	
2012	The Collection	Yes	No	
2016	The Neighbor	Yes	Executive	
2016	Rise	Yes	No	Short film
2017	Naked Fury	Yes	No	Short film
2019	Scary Stories to Tell in the Dark	Story	No	
2019	Into the Dark	Yes	Executive	Episode: "Pilgrim"
2022	Unhuman	Yes	Executive	

== Television ==
In October 2006, the duo sold their first television idea to FOX titled The Vineyard. It was a raunchy half-hour horror/comedy with Family Guy show runner Chris Sheridan attached as executive producer.

In 2008, Melton and Dunstan sold an hourlong drama to CBS titled The Good Neighbor.

Melton and Dunstan collaborated with Clive Barker in 2009 and sold an hourlong drama titled Clive Barker's Hotel to ABC. McG was attached to produce.

== Novels ==
On October 5, 2011, Melton's debut novel, Black Light, co-written with Marcus Dunstan and Stephen Romano, was released by Mulholland Books, an imprint of Little, Brown and Company, and in the UK by Mulholland Books, an imprint of Hodder & Stoughton. It is currently being adapted into a film for producer Michael De Luca.
