= David Karlak =

American director and writer

- Born: Cleveland, Ohio, United States
- Occupation: Film director
- Website: http://www.davidkarlak.com/

David Karlak is a Mexican-American director and writer, known for short films, The Candidate and Rise.

== Biography ==
David Karlak is a filmmaker based in Los Angeles, California. In 2010 Karlak directed the short film The Candidate that went on to make the Viewfinder List in 2011. Following The Candidate, Karlak sold an original sci-fi pitch to Warner Brothers titled Rise with Roy Lee producing, and then a second original pitch titled Outliers to 20th Century Fox with Peter Chernin producing. Karlak is attached to direct both films. In recent years, Karlak has been exploring the use of virtual reality to tell narratives, having directed a virtual reality experience set in the world of Rise which premiered it at the Storyscapes series at the Tribeca Film Festival in 2014.

Karlak most recently has been working with 20th Century Fox to direct two virtual reality experiences for Ridley Scott's film Alien: Covenant. The first experience, Alien: Covenant In Utero premiered April 26, 2017 for Oculus Rift and Samsung Gear VR.

On March 3, 2017, Deadline Hollywood reported that Filmula's Johnny Lin and Cross Creek's Brian Oliver acquired the feature film rights to Rise from Warner Brothers with Karlak attached to direct. Rise is about a dystopian future where robots are targeted for elimination after they develop emotional symmetry to humans and a revolutionary war for their survival begins. Anton Yelchin starred in the short, which was based on a screenplay Karlak penned with writers Marcus Dunstan and Patrick Melton (the Saw series).

== Filmography ==
- The Candidate (short, 2011)
- Rise (virtual reality experience, 2014)
- Rise (short, 2016)
- Alien: Covenant In Utero (virtual reality experience, 2017)
