= The Collection (film) =

2012 film by Marcus Dunstan

- Theatrical release poster
- Directed by: Marcus Dunstan
- Written by: Patrick Melton; Marcus Dunstan
- Based on: Characters by: Patrick Melton; Marcus Dunstan
- Produced by: Brett Forbes; Julie Richardson; Patrick Rizzotti; Mickey Liddell
- Starring: Josh Stewart; Emma Fitzpatrick; Lee Tergesen; Christopher McDonald
- Cinematography: Sam McCurdy
- Edited by: Mark Stevens; Kevin Greutert
- Music by: Charlie Clouser
- Production companies: Fortress Features; LD Entertainment
- Distributed by: LD Entertainment
- Release dates: September 21, 2012 (Fantastic Fest); November 30, 2012 (United States)
- Running time: 82 minutes
- Country: United States
- Language: English
- Budget: $4.5 million
- Box office: $9.9 million

The Collection is a 2012 American horror film directed by Marcus Dunstan and co-written with Patrick Melton, and starring Josh Stewart, Emma Fitzpatrick, Lee Tergesen and Christopher McDonald. It is a sequel to the 2009 film, The Collector. The story follows a young woman who gets captured by The Collector, while Arkin O'Brien (Stewart) escapes but is recruited shortly after by a group of mercenaries whose mission is to save her at the Collector's base.

The Collection was released by LD Entertainment on November 30, 2012. It grossed $9.9 million against a $4.5 million budget and received negative reviews from critics. A third film is in development.

== Plot ==
Elena Peters goes to a party with a group of friends. In an isolated room, Elena finds a wooden trunk in which Arkin from the previous film is trapped. Elena opens the latches, releasing Arkin and unknowingly setting off a series of booby traps, killing her friends and dozens of other party-goers. The Collector appears and kidnaps Elena, while Arkin escapes by jumping out of a window, breaking his arm in the process.

Arkin is taken to the hospital, where he learns that his wife and daughter are safe. He is approached by Lucello, an employee of Elena's wealthy father, who has hired a team of mercenaries to hunt the Collector down and save Elena. Lucello implies that if Arkin leads them to the Collector's hideout, he will expunge Arkin's criminal record.

Arkin leads the mercenary group to the Collector's base in an abandoned hotel. Meanwhile, Elena escapes from the trunk in which she was locked. Upon the team's arrival, Arkin refuses to go inside, but Lucello forces him at gunpoint to guide them through the hotel. The Collector arrives and learns that Elena has escaped before being alerted to the team's presence. Lucello's team is attacked by people who the Collector has driven insane through torture and drugging. Elena encounters a girl named Abby, who pleads for help. However, Abby learns that Elena uses a hearing aid, which she believes will place them at a disadvantage; they are subsequently separated.

Elena and Lucello reunite and find Abby, who asks to escape with them. Despite Elena not trusting her, Lucello allows Abby to accompany the group. Realizing they are trapped inside, Arkin non-fatally shoots a homeless man through a window in order to draw the police's attention. Abby sabotages their efforts of escaping before being killed by one of the Collector's traps. The Collector finds them and becomes enraged upon seeing Abby's body. He attacks the group, grabs Elena, and escapes.

As police converge at the hotel, the lights go out throughout the building; Lucello is caught in a trap and has to be left behind, while the rest of the team is eventually killed off. Arkin finds Elena, but they become trapped in a booby-trap cage. Arkin manages to open the cage by having Elena re-break his arm so that he can reach the latch.

They find an exit door to the building, but it is jammed from the outside. The Collector appears and just as he is about to kill Arkin, Lucello intervenes, having escaped from his trap, and sacrifices himself so that Arkin can gain the upper hand. Arkin beats the Collector and sets him on fire. Elena and Arkin escape as the building burns down. Arkin finds the Collector's burned mask and realizes he escaped.

Sometime later, Arkin manages to deduce the Collector's identity by researching registered entomologists within a 200-mile radius. Arkin confronts the unmasked Collector in his home at gunpoint, announcing his intentions to torture and kill him. When the Collector tries to fight back, Arkin forces him into a wooden trunk and locks him inside, trapping him.

== Cast ==
- Josh Stewart as Arkin
- Emma Fitzpatrick as Elena
- Christopher McDonald as Mr. Peters
- Lee Tergesen as Lucello
- Tim Griffin as Dre
- Andre Royo as Wally
- Randall Archer as The Collector
- Shannon Kane as Paz
- Brandon Molale as Lin
- Erin Way as Abby
- Johanna Braddy as Missy
- Michael Nardelli as Josh
- William Peltz as Brian
- Navi Rawat as Lisa
- Daniel Sharman as Basil

== Release ==
The Collection was released by LD Entertainment on November 30, 2012.

The international distribution rights of The Collection are licensed by Cinema Management Group.

=== Critical response ===
On the review aggregator website Rotten Tomatoes, 36% of 50 critics' reviews are positive, with an average rating of 4.8/10. The website's consensus reads: "The Collection offers more grisly thrills and twisted humor than its predecessor; in other words, fun for genre fans, but unpleasant for anyone else." Metacritic, which uses a weighted average, assigned the film a score of 38 out of 100, based on 16 critics, indicating "generally unfavorable" reviews.

With a negative review, Bilge Elibri from Vulture stated "...It’s like a nightmare designed by someone who’s heard a lot about nightmares but has never actually had one."

=== Box office ===
On its opening weekend, The Collection grossed $3,104,269 across 1,403 theaters in the United States, about $500,000 less than the opening weekend of the first film. It grossed $9,929,706 worldwide.

== Sequel ==
In November 2012, prior to the release of The Collection, series creators Marcus Dunstan and Patrick Melton confirmed a sequel film was in development under the title The Collected. An announcement was made in August 2014 that the film would move forward with LD Entertainment and that Josh Stewart would reprise his role of Arkin. Development continued at a slow place and in September 2018 Bloody Disgusting attributed the underperformance of The Collection as to why the film had stalled out in development.

During May 2019 Stewart unveiled a poster for the film, revealing the project had been revived. Emma Fitzpatrick was slated to return as Elena while Tom Atkins was confirmed as portraying Arkin's father. It was also confirmed that David Brown and Brett Forbes would produce. As LD Entertainment was no longer involved with the project, Brown shopped the film at the Cannes Film Festival and acquired the international rights to the film through his studio Clear Horizon Entertainment.

Filming began on September 23, 2019 in Atlanta with Atkins, Randy Havens, Dot-Marie Jones, and Navi Rawat officially joining the cast. In October, Peter Giles was revealed to be playing The Collector. After eight days of filming, production unexpectedly shut down. The cast expected production to pick up again by late October 2019. Filming was then believed to begin once again in Vancouver in early 2021, but production never took place. In April 2021, Dunstan claimed that props were stolen from the set and that the producers had not been in contact with him since the closure of production and that he does not have the rights to the film, preventing him from finishing it. Melton added that "very little" of the film was shot.

In 2022, it was confirmed that while production had been delayed it was not cancelled. In July 2024, Dunstan revealed that the project continues to be in development.
