= Jane Lillig =

American stage actress (1923–1986)

- Born: Jane Frances Lillig; December 19, 1923; Hollywood, California, U.S.
- Died: March 8, 1986 (aged 62)
- Education: Pasadena Junior College
- Occupation: Actress
- Years active: 25
- Spouse(s): Joseph M. Albrecht (m. 1964; died 1972)

Jane Frances Lillig (December 19, 1923 – March 8, 1986) was an American stage actress and comedienne, often likened to Edna May Oliver, perhaps best remembered for her featured role in The Music Man.

== Early life and career ==
Born Jane Frances Lillig on December 19, 1923, Lillig was a native of Hollywood, California, raised in Pasadena and Altadena. The daughter of Mr. and Mrs. John G. Gillig, she attended Eliot Junior High School and Pasadena Junior College. In 1942, she portrayed Prince Hamlet, as one of the three students representing the College at the 22nd annual Shakespeare Festival held at Occidental College. In November of that year, Gillig won praise for her "clearcut characterization" of Lady Catherine de Bourgh in the school's production of Helen Jerome's adaptation of Jane Austen's Pride and Prejudice.

By the time Lillig completed her education in Pasadena, her family had relocated to Chicago, where, as of no later than November 1945, Jane began her long association with the city's Uptown Players, and, in particular, the British-born actor/director Geoffrey Gardner.

In 1959, minus fanfare, Lillig earned her first two screen credits, appearing in one episode each of seasons 6 and 7 of the anthology series, U.S. Steel Hour. The former aired on February 11, with Lillig as the "second maiden lady" in Morton Wishengrad's adaptation of the Tolstoy novella, Family Happiness, directed by Sidney Lumet; the latter, airing September 19, was an original—if somewhat derivative–suspense outing entitled "The Hours Before Dawn", with Lillig—as Miss Hooper—rounding out a cast headed by Teresa Wright, Mark Richman, and Colleen Dewhurst, which, according to critic Steven H. Scheuer, "struggles valiantly with this slightly muddled horror story".

In the interim between her screen debut and its successor, Lillig delivered a well-received turn as the "stuffy Britisher" Lady Beekman in a stock company revival of Anita Loos' Gentlemen Prefer Blondes, a performance dubbed "nothing short of hysterically funny" by The Morning Call. Reviewing the same performance, Bergen Evening Record critic G. J. Hekker pairs Lillig and fellow stage veteran Dossie Hollingsworth as the two "gems in [an otherwise] drab production". Moreover, he observes, so ironclad is Lillig's grasp of character and so exemplary her comic deportment that, amidst an atypically flub-riddled opening night performance, the one hitch directly attributable to Lillig produces the evening's most memorable moment (and one which, Hecker adds, only half facetiously, the production would do well to reenact on a nightly basis).

As Lady Phyllis Beekman, she has a firm grasp on the character and creates a perfect vignette. Miss Lillig's performance withstood the onslaught of an unusually heavy amount of opening night flubs. The common ones, answering the telephone without a ring, will be corrected before tonight's performance. One mishap, which can be directly credited to Miss Lillig, should be used as part of the production. She pushed a fellow actor down into a chair so hard it cracked under and he went through the seat. And still, Miss Lillig didn't crack a smile. Bravo, Miss Lillig!

Acclaim for her stage portrayal of Eulalie Mackecknie Shinn in Meredith Willson's The Music Man—and, in particular, the show's two-week-long "triumphant return" to Cleveland, commencing October 30, 1961—led directly to what appears to be Lillig's only TV talk show appearance, (Note: Not to mention what is almost certainly the longest—if not the only—interview ever conducted with this much-praised performer.) when she was the featured guest—"Actress Jane Lillig"—on the November 9 episode of Ten O'Clock Talk on WEWS-TV.

In the late 1970s, Lillig appeared in at least two Masquers Club productions, beginning in 1976 with the original comic operetta, Dear Little Euphoria or the Schlepping Prince, and returning three years later in the Noël Coward comedy, Present Laughter. Though neither was widely seen, much less reviewed, they did win the actress at least one new fan, namely LA Times theater critic Sondra Lowell, who dubbed Lillig's performance as Euphoria's Faerie Queen "outrageously good".

== Personal life and death ==
On August 17, 1964, Lillig married Joseph Albrecht of Kensington, Maryland.

Predeceased by her husband, Lillig died on March 8, 1986, at age 62.

== Filmography ==
- United States Steel Hour
  - Ep. "Family Happiness" (1959) – Second Maiden Lady
  - Ep. "The Hours Before Dawn" (1959) – Mrs. Hooper
- 10 O'Clock Club
  - Ep. (1961) – Herself
- McClain's Law
  - Ep. "A Time of Peril" (1981) – Mrs. Anderson (uncredited)
- Frances (1982) – Mental Patient
- Lies (TV movie, 1983) – Landlady
- The Fantastic World of D.C. Collins (1984) – Elderly lady (credited but does not appear) (Note: Lillig clearly is credited at the end of the film (indeed, this film's closing credit crawl includes no one but bit players, and it is only they who are fully credited—i.e. credits which identify both actor and character portrayed), and yet no one remotely resembling Lillig—whose 1983 incarnation can, for the sake of comparison, as of September 2025, easily be viewed online—appears to have been given even the most fleeting walk-on in this film, much less a single word of dialogue; nor, for that matter, does any female character who could reasonably be described as "elderly".)
