= Judah Friedlander =

American actor and comedian (born 1969)

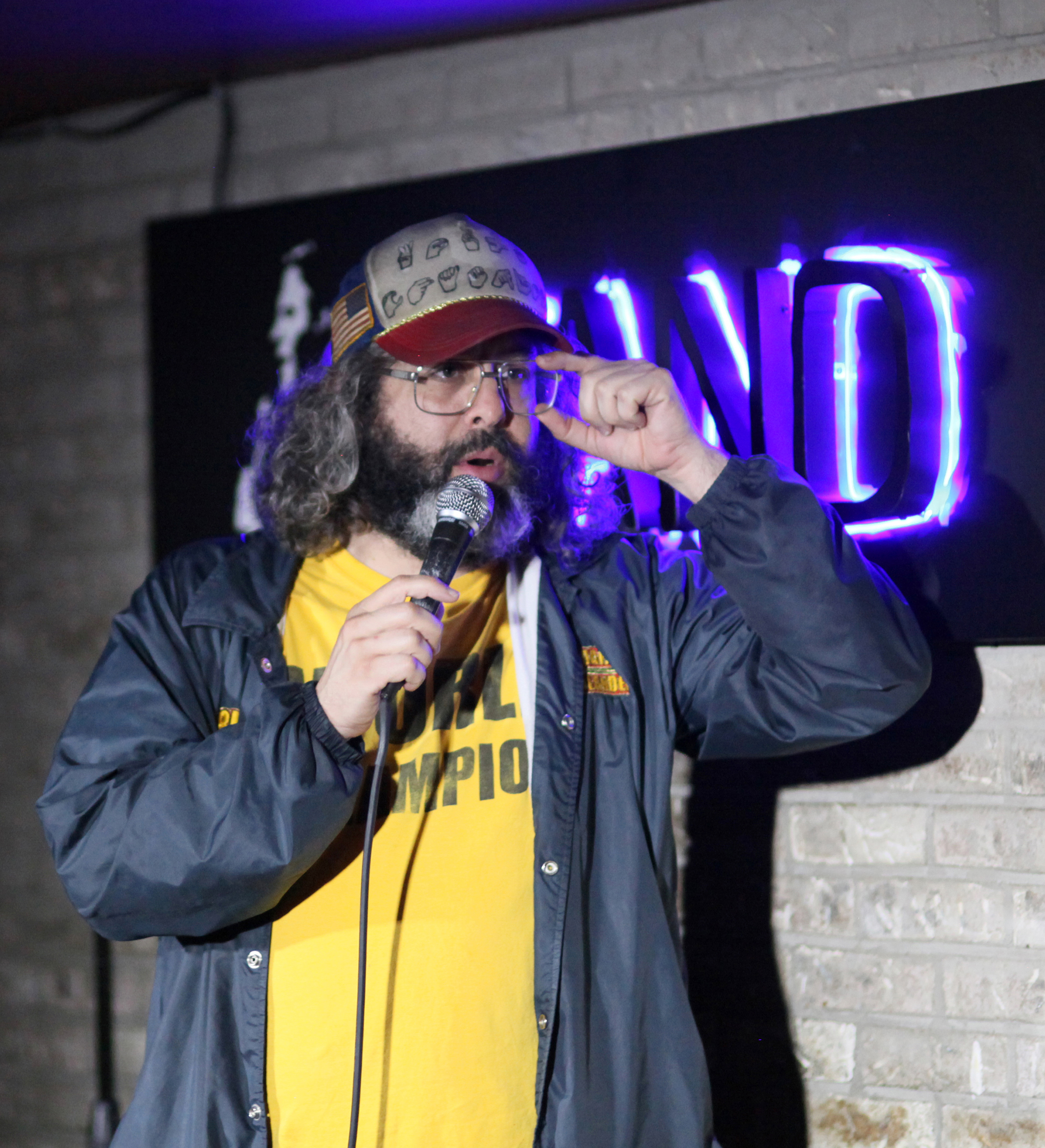
- Friedlander at The Stand in June 2016.
- Born: March 16, 1969 (age 57); Gaithersburg, Maryland, U.S.
- Education: New York University
- Occupations: Actor, comedian
- Years active: 1989–present
- Website: www.judahfriedlander.com

Judah Friedlander (born March 16, 1969) is an American actor and stand-up comedian. He is known for playing the role of writer Frank Rossitano on the NBC sitcom 30 Rock. Friedlander is also known for his role as Toby Radloff in the film American Splendor, a role that garnered him favorable reviews and a nomination for best supporting actor at the 2004 Independent Spirit Awards. Earlier in his career, he was recognized as "the hug guy" from the music video for the 2001 Dave Matthews Band single "Everyday".

Friedlander is known for his distinctive look, which includes oversized glasses, shaggy hair, and a T-shirt and trucker hat (both often emblazoned with slogans such as "world champion"), and a generally unkempt appearance. It is a look he maintains as a stand-up comedian, during most of his public appearances, and which he has employed in some of his acting roles.

== Early life ==
Friedlander was born in Gaithersburg, Maryland, the son of Shirley and Art Friedlander. His father was of Russian Jewish descent and his mother, a native of Pittsburgh, is Croatian American.

As a child, Friedlander drew political cartoons and made animated films. He first tried stand-up comedy in 1989 at the age of 19 while attending New York University. Friedlander graduated from the Gallatin School of Individualized Study.

== Career ==
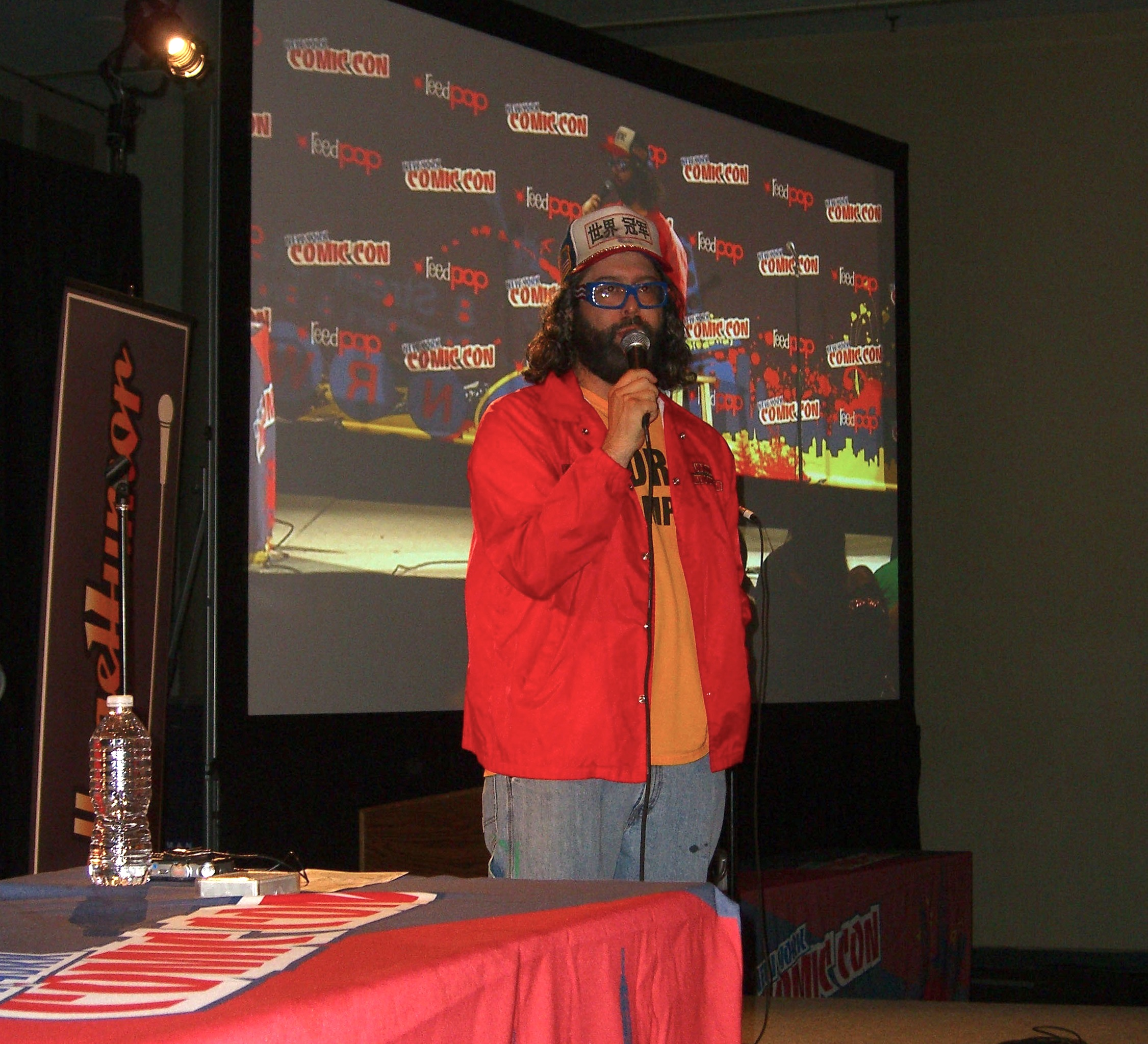
Friedlander at the CollegeHumor presentation at the 2012 New York Comic Con

=== Stand-up comedy ===
Friedlander has performed stand-up comedy regularly throughout his entertainment career. He continued to perform stand-up several nights a week in New York City while working on the sitcom 30 Rock. Friedlander has stated that he is most relaxed when doing stand-up and that he considers stand-up to be his first true love, preferring it to acting. He stated in 2012 that stand-up comedy is "still the most important thing I do from an artistic standpoint."

Friedlander has cited comedians Steven Wright, Sam Kinison and John Mulrooney as influences. He also says that Dave Attell is one of his favorite comics.

Friedlander's comedic performances often feature him making outrageous and bombastic claims about himself with a deadpan delivery. Many of these claims are reflected in slogans displayed on the many trucker hats he wears — the most common being "World Champion", a slogan he has worn in various languages.

One of his claims include being an expert in karate, having achieved an "extra-dark black belt" in the sport. In 2010, he authored the humor book How to Beat Up Anybody: An Instructional and Inspirational Karate Book by the World Champion. Friedlander's claims provide comedic irony when contrasted against his nonchalant attitude and physical appearance. Friedlander wears large, thick-rimmed glasses, is often unshaven and is generally unkempt.

The look that Friedlander employs during his stand-up has also carried over into some of his television and film roles, including his 30 Rock role as TV writer Frank Rossitano. Frank is however much lazier than Friedlander's "World Champion" persona.

In 2007, Heeb magazine included Friedlander in their list of "100 people you need to know about".

In 2017, Friedlander's first Netflix special, America is the Greatest Country in the United States, was released.

=== Television ===
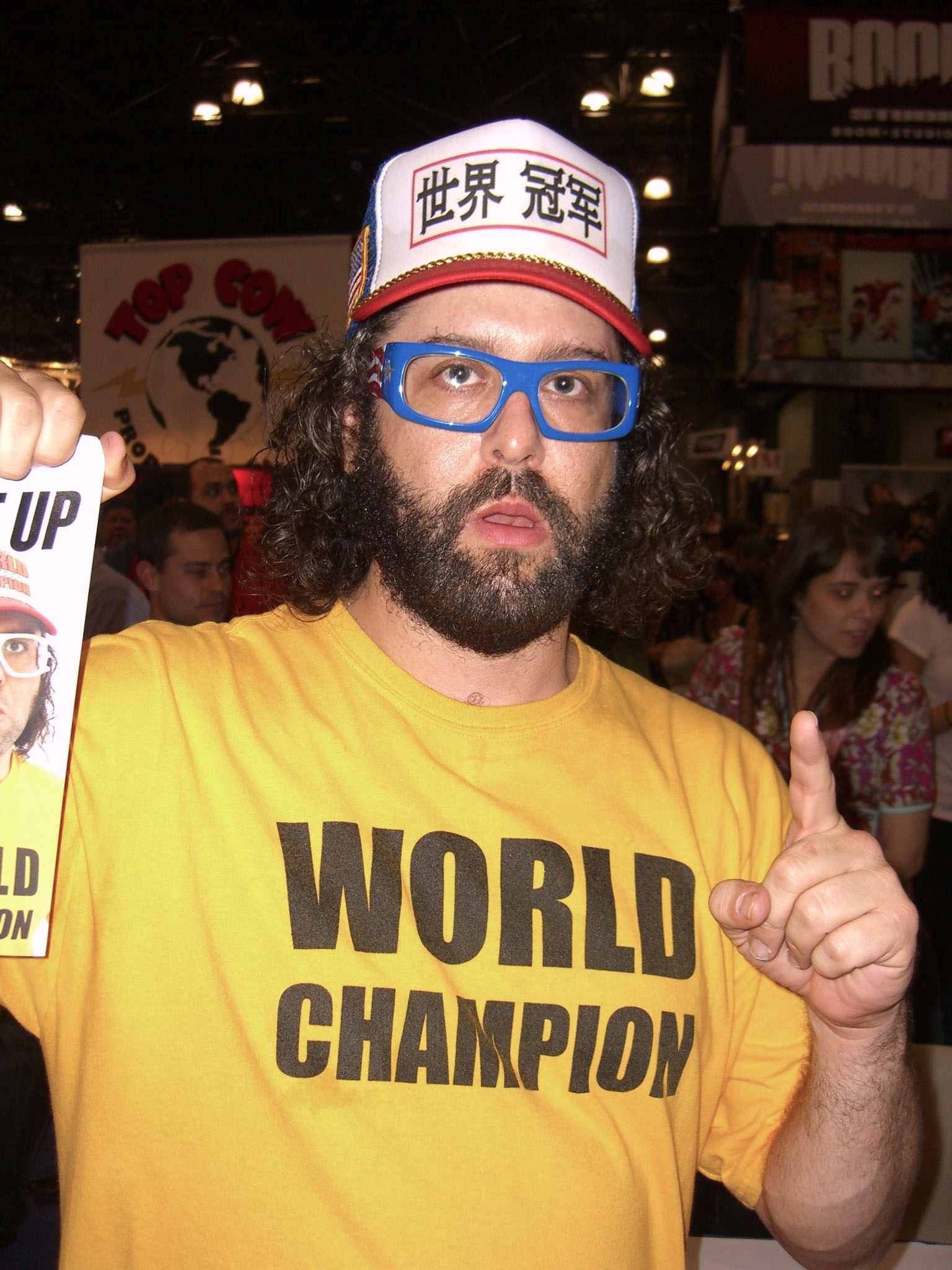
Friedlander in October 2010

Friedlander played the role of a techie on the Al Franken sitcom LateLine in 1999. Over the 2000s Friedlander held guest roles on several television shows, including Spin City, Curb Your Enthusiasm and Flight of the Conchords, as well as providing voices for characters on the animated series Wonder Showzen and Xavier: Renegade Angel. Friedlander made regular appearances on the entertainment and pop-culture program Best Week Ever. He appeared as the online co-host of the 2009 TV Land Awards, alongside main stage host Neil Patrick Harris.

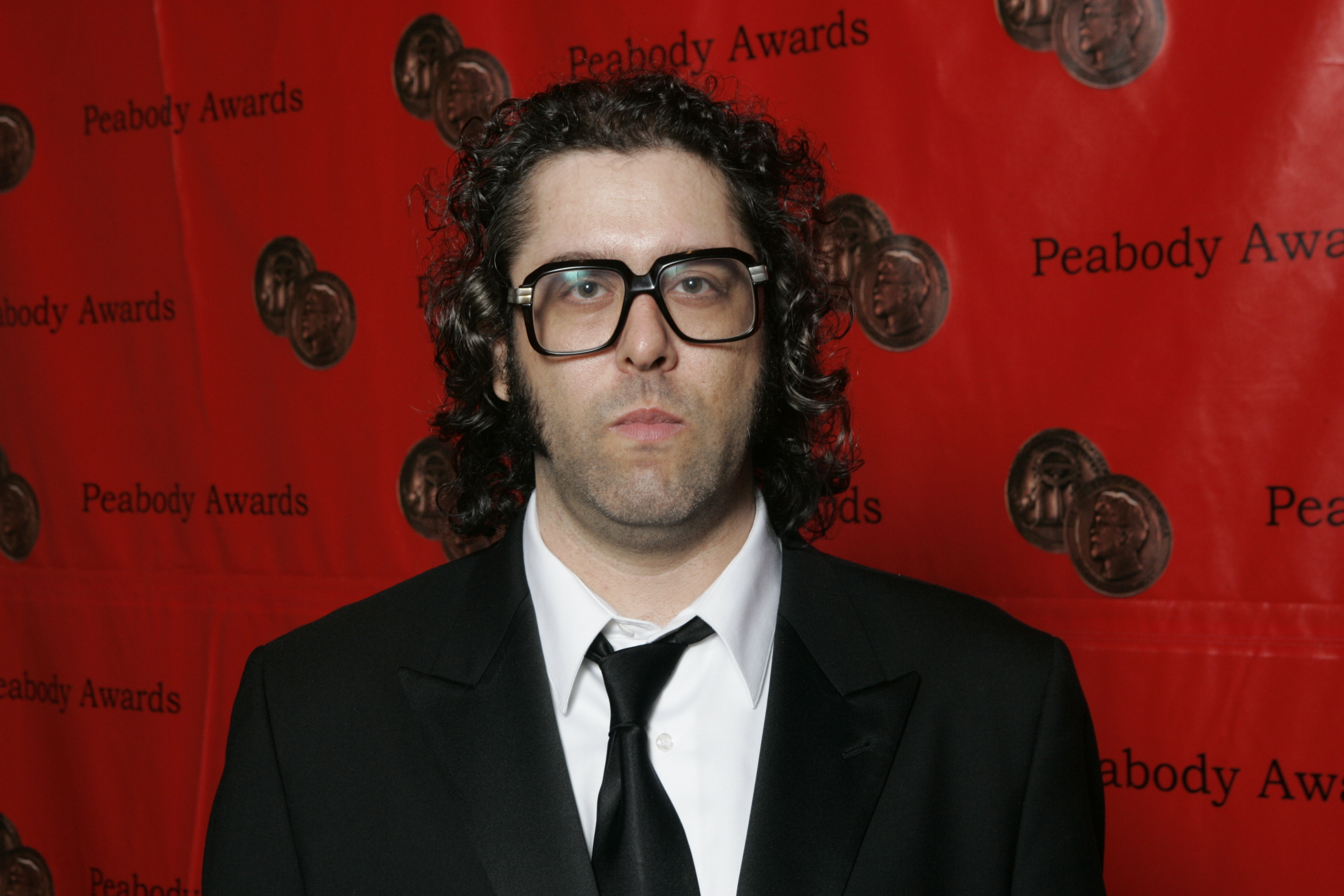
Judah Friedlander at the 67th Annual Peabody Awards for 30 Rock

Friedlander was a regular cast member of the sitcom 30 Rock throughout its entire run, from October 11, 2006, to January 31, 2013. His character, Frank Rossitano, is a sarcastic and wisecracking writer on the fictional show TGS with Tracy Jordan Frank is lazy, slovenly, and lives with his mother (played by Patti Lupone). He is also sex-obsessed, which he often reveals by way of vulgar and sexually suggestive comments. Friedlander has stated that Frank Rossitano is based on at least two writers with whom Tina Fey used to work at Saturday Night Live. His ever-changing, slogan-bearing trucker hats also became a running gag on the show. Friedlander makes his hats himself and created enough of them to be able to wear a different one in each scene of 30 Rock, which is about three hats per show.

Friedlander has appeared on late-night talk shows such as Late Night with Conan O'Brien, The Daily Show with Jon Stewart, The Daily Show with Trevor Noah, The Tonight Show with Jay Leno, Late Night with Jimmy Fallon and Last Call with Carson Daly. In 2010 Friedlander appeared in 2 episodes of the children's series Sesame Street. He also appeared as a panelist on The Burn with Jeff Ross in 2013.

In May and June 2014, Friedlander narrated ESPN's Inside: U.S. Soccer's March to Brazil six-part series in preparation for the World Cup in Brazil.

He has appeared on MSNBC's Last Word with Lawrence O'Donnell and provided personal commentary on The World Cup and soccer in general.

=== Film and video ===
In 2001, Friedlander played "the hug guy" in the music video for the Dave Matthews Band single "Everyday"; his character is seen hugging various people throughout the video. Friedlander was recognized for his "hug guy" role for years after appearing in the video, causing complete strangers to offer him hugs. The same year, he appeared in the comedy film Wet Hot American Summer.

In 2003 Friedlander played Toby Radloff in the biopic American Splendor, a role that received favorable reviews — his performance was deemed "unforgettable" by The New York Times and "pitch-perfect" by both Nick A. Zaino III of The Boston Globe and Dan Dinicola of The Daily Gazette. He was also nominated in the category of best supporting actor at the 2004 Independent Spirit Awards.

Friedlander had roles in the Ben Stiller films Meet the Parents, Zoolander and Along Came Polly.

He had a starring role in the 2005 independent comedy Full Grown Men and a supporting role in the 2008 drama The Wrestler.

He has also appeared in films such as Duane Hopwood, Chapter 27, Southern Belles, Live Free or Die, and Feast.

== Personal life ==
Friedlander has lived in the New York City area for most of his career, with the exception of two years spent in Los Angeles. Currently residing in Queens, he has stated that he prefers living in New York.

Friedlander enjoys playing table tennis. As a child, Friedlander had played the sport competitively; he took it up again in 2008. He is a big fan of professional wrestling, which is often used as subject matter for his trademark hats and shirts. He is also a fan of the New York Red Bulls, has attended games at Red Bull Arena and appeared in commercials for the team.

== Filmography ==
=== Film ===
Year	Title	Role	Notes
2000	Endsville	Wrestling fan	
2000	Meet the Parents	Pharmacy clerk	
2001	Wet Hot American Summer	Ronald von Kleinstein	
2001	Zoolander	Scrappy Zoolander	
2001	How High	Student	
2002	Showtime	Julio	
2003	The Trade	Duffy Dyer	
2003	Old School	Action figure dude	
2003	American Splendor	Toby Radloff	
2003	The Janitor	Drunk man	
2004	Starsky & Hutch	Ice-cream man	
2004	Bad Meat	Maintenance man	
2004	Along Came Polly	Dustin	
2005	Duane Hopwood	Anthony	
2005	Southern Belles	Duane	
2005	Pizza	Jimmy	
2005	The Unseen	Earl	
2005	Feast	Beer guy	
2006	The Darwin Awards	Simon	
2006	Date Movie	Nicky	
2006	Live Free or Die	Hesh	
2006	The Cassidy Kids	Adult Max Cassidy	
2006	Full Grown Men	Elias Guber	
2007	Chapter 27	Paul	
2007	The Proctor	Harry	Short film
2008	Feast II: Sloppy Seconds	Beer guy	
2008	Meet Dave	Engineer	
2008	The Wrestler	Scott Brumberg	
2009	I Hate Valentine's Day	Dan O'Finn	
2009	Cabin Fever 2: Spring Fever	Toby	
2010	Beware the Gonzo	Cafeteria guy	
2011	Rio	Tourist	Voice
2013	Epic	Larry the Cab Driver	Voice
2014	Ping Pong Summer	Anthony	
2015	Star Wars: The Force Awakens	Bar Patron	
2019	Can You Keep a Secret?	Mick	

=== Television ===
Year	Title	Role	Notes
1999	LateLine	Techie	3 episodes
2000	Spin City	Flirtatious Man in Bar	Episode: "About Last Night"
2000	The Beat		Episode: "The Beat Goes On"
2001	Spring Break Lawyer	Mervin	Television film
2002	O2Be	Trailer Trash	Episode: "O2Be"
2003	Old School	Action Figure Dude	Pilot
2004	Curb Your Enthusiasm	Donald	Episode: "The Blind Date"
2005	Cheap Seats: Without Ron Parker	Steven Gregory	Episode: "1995 SuperDogs! Superjocks!"
2005	Sunday Pants		Voice; Segment "History According to Noodle"
2006	Wonder Showzen	Crickey	2 episodes
2006–2013	30 Rock	Frank Rossitano	119 episodes
2007	Flight of the Conchords	Isabella	Episode: "Sally"
2009	Xavier: Renegade Angel	Big Papa Dick / Slippy Villager	Voices; 2 episodes
2009	100 Greatest One Hit Wonders of the 80s	Host	
2010	Sesame Street	Inspector 4	Episode: "Inspected by 4"
2010	Sesame Street	Himself	Episode: "Abby's Tricycle"
2010	The Life & Times of Tim	Ping Pong Guy	Voice; Episode: "Stu Is Good at Something"
2011	The Heart, She Holler		Episode: "Dare to Holler"
2011	Ice Age: A Mammoth Christmas	Head Mini Sloth	
2013	Childrens Hospital	Al Yankovic	Episode: "Country Weekend"
2014	Sharknado 2: The Second One	Bryan	Television film
2015	Fresh Off the Boat	Ray	Episode: "Very Superstitious"
2015	Wet Hot American Summer: First Day of Camp	Ron von Kleinenstein	2 episodes
2015	The Jim Gaffigan Show	Himself	Episode: "My Friend the Priest"
2016	Bordertown	Sanford Buckwald	Voice; 13 episodes
2016	Albert	Gene	Voice; Television film
2017	Bob's Burgers	Ferdie	Voice; Episode: "Like Gene for Chocolate"
2017	Unbreakable Kimmy Schmidt	Gordy	2 episodes
2017	America is the Greatest Country in the United States	Himself	Stand-up special; also director and editor
2018	The Last Sharknado: It's About Time	Bryan	Television film

=== Awards and nominations ===
Year	Award	Category	Nominated work	Result
2004	Independent Spirit Awards	Best Supporting Male	American Splendor	Nominated
2008	Screen Actors Guild Awards	Outstanding Performance by an Ensemble in a Comedy Series (shared with the cast)	30 Rock	Nominated
2008	Gold Derby Awards	Ensemble of the Year (shared with the cast)	30 Rock	Nominated
2009	Gold Derby Awards	Ensemble of the Year (shared with the cast)	30 Rock	Nominated
2009	Screen Actors Guild Awards	Outstanding Performance by an Ensemble in a Comedy Series (shared with the cast)	30 Rock	Won
2010	Screen Actors Guild Awards	Outstanding Performance by an Ensemble in a Comedy Series (shared with the cast)	30 Rock	Nominated
2011	Screen Actors Guild Awards	Outstanding Performance by an Ensemble in a Comedy Series (shared with the cast)	30 Rock	Nominated
2012	Screen Actors Guild Awards	Outstanding Performance by an Ensemble in a Comedy Series (shared with the cast)	30 Rock	Nominated
2013	Screen Actors Guild Awards	Outstanding Performance by an Ensemble in a Comedy Series (shared with the cast)	30 Rock	Nominated
2014	Screen Actors Guild Awards	Outstanding Performance by an Ensemble in a Comedy Series (shared with the cast)	30 Rock	Nominated
