= Lies (1983 film) =

1983 film directed by Ken and Jim Wheat

- Directed by: Ken Wheat; Jim Wheat
- Written by: Ken Wheat; Jim Wheat
- Produced by: Shelley Hermann; Ken Wheat; Jim Wheat
- Cinematography: Robert Ebinger
- Edited by: Dennis M. Hill; Michael D. Ornstein
- Music by: Marc Donahue
- Production companies: Midnight; Wescom Productions
- Distributed by: Film Gallery.
- Release date: 1983
- Running time: 100 minutes
- Country: United States
- Language: English

Lies is a 1983 American thriller film written, directed, and produced by Ken and Jim Wheat in their directorial debut.

== Plot ==
Robyn Wallace, an out-of-work actress, is asked to play the lead role in a biographical film about a woman named Elizabeth who spent time in a psychiatric hospital following a violent attack.

== Cast ==
- Ann Dusenberry as Robyn Wallace
- Gail Strickland as Jessica Brenner
- Bruce Davison as Stuart Russell
- Clu Gulager as Dr. Bartlett
- Terence Knox as Eric Macklin
- Bert Remsen as Murrey Haliday
- Stacy Keach Sr. as Uncle Charles
- Douglas Leonard as Dr. Whitmyer
- Patience Cleveland as Aunt Louise
- Julie Philips as Elizabeth
- Ann Gibbs as Day Nurse
- Dick Miller as Producer
- Walter Wood as Director
- Jerry Vaughn as Maintenance Man
- Guy Remsen as Hospital Guard
- Tony Miller as Elizabeth's Father
- Jean Howell as Elizabeth's Mother
- B.J. Davis as First Burglar
- Eddie Braun as Second Burglar
- Jane Lillig as Landlady
- Miriam Byrd-Nethery as Night Nurse (as Miriam Byrd Nethery)
- Patricia Lentz as Hysterical Patient
- Rebecca Robertson as Eric's New Girl
- Joshua Gallegos as Orderly
- Susann Akers as Second Nurse
- Douglas Manes as Movie Psycho
- Omar Paxson as Sedated Patient

== Release ==
The film was rated R for its release in the United States.

=== Reception ===
Reviewer Sheila Benson of the Los Angeles Times wrote, "The biggest pain about stories like these is illogical behavior--and 'Lies' is refreshingly free of that (most of the time). Dusenberry in particular behaves like a bright, canny, hardworking professional, questioning her situation at every turn. It would be unfair to hint at more of the plot than the title suggests. But the cast also includes such veterans as Clu Gulager, as an associate of Strickland’s and Burt Remsen as Dusenberry's agent; as well as Terence Knox as her screenwriter boyfriend. Logic takes a back road two-thirds of the way through and is in full flight by the close, but the movie's pluses include exceptionally beautiful lighting camera work by Robert Ebinger and fine production design, both of which give the film a look of real quality."

The website terrortrap.com gave the film a rating of two stars. The review reads, "A little fun can be had with this mediocre horror. But ultimately it's too convoluted to be taken seriously. [...] Similar to both 1976's Scalpel (a better version of this sort of thing) and Dead of Winter, this has a few good moments, but tries to be too clever for its own good; its twisty plotlines lose you in the end. [...] Lies isn't anything special, but it is competently directed and boasts decent production values, so mystery aficionados will no doubt find some entertainment here."
