= Marcus Dunstan =

American filmmaker

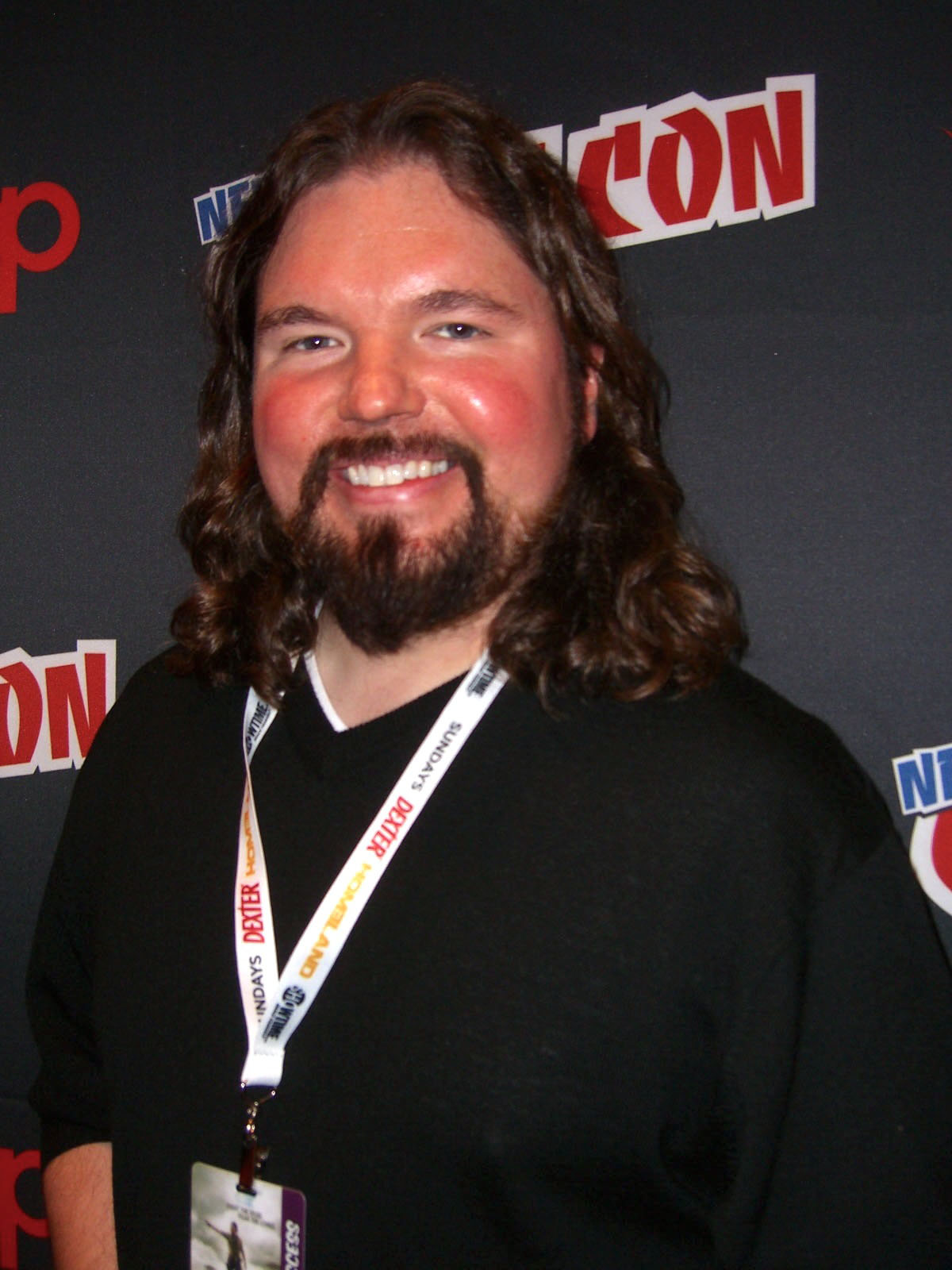
- Marcus Dunstan at 2012 New York Comic Con
- Born: Macomb, Illinois, United States
- Occupations: Screenwriter, film director

Marcus Dunstan is an American filmmaker who, along with frequent collaborator Patrick Melton, wrote the screenplay for the film Feast, which was the winner of Season Three of the filmmaking competition reality TV series Project Greenlight. Dunstan has since written the screenplays for Feast II: Sloppy Seconds, Feast III: The Happy Finish, and four films in the Saw franchise. Dunstan also directed and co-wrote the films The Collector, its sequel The Collection, and Unhuman.

== Early life ==
Dunstan was born in Macomb, Illinois. He spent his formative years working in movie theaters and studying film at the University of Iowa.

While in college Dunstan experimented with 16mm film often using himself as the guinea pig in poorly executed stunts that left him dragging behind a car, the target of flying knives, and thrice being set on fire. He holds the record for spilling the most fake blood ever in a student film. Since moving to Los Angeles in 1999, Dunstan toiled in several odd jobs including a retirement home, an Optometry clinic, and a video store while spending his nights writing on a computer borrowed from fellow screenwriter, Patrick Melton.

== Career ==
In March 2005, Dunstan and Melton won Season Three of Project Greenlight with their screenplay, Feast, which was directed by John Gulager. The film starred Krista Allen and Eric Dane, and was produced by Dimension Films and Neo Art & Logic.

Dunstan has written the screenplays for Feast, Feast II: Sloppy Seconds, Feast III: The Happy Finish, The Collector, Saw IV, Saw V, Saw VI, and Saw 3D. He is also in pre-production and post-production for several of his other screenplays. In addition to writing the screenplay for The Collector, he directed the film. He also directed the sequel to The Collector, titled The Collection. The film, produced by Liddell Entertainment and Fortress Features, was released in 2012.

In addition to writing and directing, he and writing partner Patrick Melton have made cameo appearances in Saw V, Supergator, Feast, and The Collector, appearing in the later two through the same puppet show clip shown on TV screens. He, Melton, and Stephen Romano co-wrote the thriller novel Black Light - Don't Look Too Deep, which was published on October 5, 2011, over Mulholland Books as hardcover. The novel will adapt in a feature film written by Melton and Dunstan, under the direction of Romano, Michael De Luca will produce for Warner Bros. Dunstan co-wrote with Patrick Melton a screenplay for potential eleventh film of the Halloween franchise titled Halloween Returns.

In 2013, Melton and Dunstan were enlisted to perform uncredited rewrites on Pacific Rim when their spec script Monstropolis caught Guillermo del Toro's attention, and then were attached to a film version of God of War. In October 2016, Dunstan, along with partner Melton, were selected to write for the adaptation of Brandon Sanderson's The Way of Kings.

== Filmography ==
Year	Title	Director	Writer	Executive Producer
2005	Feast	No	Yes	No
2007	Saw IV	No	Yes	No
2008	Feast II: Sloppy Seconds	No	Yes	No
2008	Saw V	No	Yes	No
2009	Feast III: The Happy Finish	No	Yes	No
2009	The Collector	Yes	Yes	No
2009	Saw VI	No	Yes	No
2010	Saw 3D	No	Yes	No
2012	Piranha 3DD	No	Yes	No
2012	The Collection	Yes	Yes	No
2016	The Neighbor	Yes	Yes	Yes
2019	Scary Stories to Tell in the Dark	No	Story	No
2022	Unhuman	Yes	Yes	No
2024	AMFAD All My Friends Are Dead	Yes	No	No

Short film

Year	Title	Writer	Producer
2010	The Candidate	Yes	Yes
2016	Rise	Yes	No
2016	Crazy Baby	Story	No
2017	Naked Fury	Yes	No

Television

Year	Title	Director	Writer	Note
2019	Into the Dark	Yes	Yes	Episode "Pilgrim"
