= Piranha 3DD =

2012 American film by John Gulager

- Theatrical release poster
- Directed by: John Gulager
- Written by: Patrick Melton; Marcus Dunstan; Joel Soisson
- Based on: Characters by: Peter Goldfinger; Josh Stolberg
- Produced by: Mark Canton; Marc Toberoff; Joel Soisson
- Starring: Danielle Panabaker; Matt Bush; David Koechner; Chris Zylka; Katrina Bowden; Gary Busey; Christopher Lloyd; David Hasselhoff
- Cinematography: Alexandre Lehmann
- Edited by: Devin C. Lussier; Martin Bernfeld; Kirk Morri
- Music by: Elia Cmiral
- Production companies: Radius-TWC; Mark Canton/IPW; Neo Art & Logic
- Distributed by: Dimension Films
- Release dates: May 11, 2012 (United Kingdom); June 1, 2012 (United States)
- Running time: 82 minutes
- Country: United States
- Language: English
- Budget: $7.5 million
- Box office: $8.5 million

Piranha 3DD is a 2012 American 3D horror comedy film directed by John Gulager and written by Marcus Dunstan and Patrick Melton. It is a sequel to the 2010 film Piranha 3D and the fifth installment in the Piranha film series, and stars Danielle Panabaker, Matt Bush, David Koechner, Chris Zylka, Katrina Bowden, Gary Busey, Christopher Lloyd, and David Hasselhoff. The events of film take place after those of the previous film and include a school of bloodthirsty, prehistoric, carnivorous piranhas invading a newly opened water park in Arizona.

Piranha 3DD was released in the United Kingdom on May 11, 2012, and in the United States on June 1, 2012, by Dimension Films. The film underperformed at the box office, grossing $8.5 million worldwide against a budget of $7.5 million. It received mostly negative reviews.

== Plot ==
A year after the massacre by prehistoric piranhas in Lake Victoria, Arizona, a massive eradication program has left the lake uninhabitable and the town largely abandoned. At Cross Lake, two farmers search the waters. Piranha eggs laid inside a dead cow hatch, and the farmers are killed and eaten.

Maddy, a marine biology student, returns home for the summer to the water park she co-owns and is annoyed to find that the other owner, her stepfather Chet, plans to add an adult-themed section to the water park that allows nudity. Later that night, Maddy's friend Shelby and her boyfriend Josh go skinny-dipping in the lake, where a piranha fry enters Shelby's vagina. Their friends Ashley and Travis begin to have sex in their van, but Ashley accidentally releases the parking brake, causing the van to roll into the lake. Handcuffed to the van during foreplay and unable to escape, Travis is devoured by piranhas while Ashley, on the roof, calls for help. No one is around to rescue her. The van sinks into the lake and the piranhas eat her.

The next day, the van is dragged out of the lake, where it is found to be empty. Kyle relays this to Shelby, who attempts to call Ashley, only for the call to go straight to voicemail. A distraught Shelby runs off, with Maddy following after her. Maddy finds Shelby sitting on a jetty, and goes on to console Shelby about their missing friends. While they are sitting on the jetty, they are both attacked by a school of piranhas. They manage to kill one, and Maddy, Kyle (a cop and Maddy's ex) and Maddy's coworker Barry take it to marine expert Carl Goodman to examine. He informs them that the piranhas may be moving between lakes and could evolve to travel over land. The trio returns to the lake, where they establish that the piranhas cannot enter the pipes connecting the lake and the water park. While Shelby and Josh are having sex, the piranha in Shelby's vagina bites Josh's penis, forcing him to chop it off. Both are hospitalized but survive. Kyle is revealed to be corrupt and taking bribes from Chet, who is pumping water from an underground river into the water park. Chet orders Kyle to keep Maddy from finding out about his plans.

The adult water park opens with David Hasselhoff in attendance as a celebrity guest. Among the guests are Deputy Fallon and former cameraman Andrew Cunningham, survivors of the previous year's piranha attacks in which Fallon lost his legs. Fallon is there in the hope of overcoming his fear of the water. Maddy attempts to shut the water park down but is stopped by Chet and Kyle. The piranhas enter the area through the pipes and attack, killing many guests. Fallon uses a shotgun leg prosthesis to fight the piranhas, while Hasselhoff rescues a young boy named David. An uncaring Chet attempts to escape, but a low-hanging pendant banner decapitates him.

Maddy instructs Barry to begin draining the pools while she attempts to save those still in the water. However, while rescuing people, she becomes caught in the suction and is dragged down to the bottom of the pool. Barry sees a dolphin-sized adult piranha swimming toward her and throws a litter trident to kill it. After Kyle refuses to save her because of his fear of piranhas, Barry, despite being unable to swim, leaps down and brings her to the surface, at which point Maddy is revived. Thankful to him for saving her, she shares a kiss with Barry, who reveals that he has a crush on her.

Another employee, Big Dave, pours chlorine into the pipes, followed by a lit joint. A resulting explosion kills most of the piranhas. Kyle is also killed by a falling trident. The celebrations are cut short when Maddy receives a phone call from Mr. Goodman, who informs them that the piranha left with him has escaped its tank and can now move on land, to which Maddy replies that she already knows. A lone piranha emerges from the pool and decapitates David while he tries to photograph it. The film ends with the survivors taking pictures of David's corpse with his hysterical mother covered in his blood, and Hasselhoff, overlooking the incident from his chair, calls David a "little ginger Moron".

== Cast ==
- Danielle Panabaker as Maddy
- Matt Bush as Barry
- Katrina Bowden as Shelby
- Jean-Luc Bilodeau as Josh
- David Koechner as Chet
- Chris Zylka as Kyle
- Adrian Martinez as Big Dave
- Paul James Jordan as Travis
- Meagan Tandy as Ashley
- David Hasselhoff as himself
- Paul Scheer as Andrew
- Christopher Lloyd as Mr. Goodman
- Gary Busey as Clayton
- Clu Gulager as Mo
- Sierra Fisk as Bethany
- Matthew Lintz as Freckled Boy
- Sylvia Jefferies as Young Mother
- Irina Voronina as Kiki
- Ving Rhames as Deputy Fallon (uncredited)

== Production ==
Following the release of Piranha 3D, Josh Stolberg and Peter Goldfinger expressed interest in working on another Piranha film, pitching their ideas for a sequel. However, the duo was cut out from working on Piranha 3DD by Bob and Harvey Weinstein because the plans for the sequel were deemed too expensive; the Weinsteins wanted to make a low-budget sequel. Despite not working on it, Stolberg and Goldfinger ultimately received a co-producer credit in the film. However, a scene cut from their original Piranha 3D script for budgetary reasons, which had a car full of people sinking into Lake Havasu, was repurposed and filmed for Piranha 3DD.

In October 2010, Dimension Films announced that they had secured John Gulager to direct the film, based on a script by Saw 3D screenwriters Patrick Melton and Marcus Dunstan. Filming was intended to take place between January 17, 2011, and February 18, 2011, in Baton Rouge, Louisiana, with an intended release date of August 2011, but this schedule became impractical because of cold weather and the requirement for most of the cast to be wearing little or no clothing. In March 2011, production on the film was delayed, and Joel Soisson was brought in to produce the film and rewrite the Dunstan–Melton script.

Principal photography began in Wilmington, North Carolina, on April 25, 2011, with some filming occurring at the Jungle Rapids water park and the Shaw-Speaks community center. Soisson stated that in choosing a shooting location, he was looking for an "iconic America town" that "could be anywhere". Soisson also indicated that tax rebates and the variety of geography in North Carolina had convinced them to choose the location over Louisiana.

Filming was completed on May 27, 2011, after 33 days, with three weeks of filming at the Jungle Rapids water park. The film was shot using 3D rigs, as opposed to converting the film to 3D in post-production. Piranha 3DD was cinematographer Alexandre Lehmann's first 3D film. Devin C. Lussier and Martin Bernfeld were hired to edit.

== Release ==
The film was initially scheduled for released on November 23, 2011, but a several-month delay in the commencement of filming meant that the November deadline could not be met. A month before the scheduled November release, the release date was pushed to 2012. In March 2012, it was announced that the film would be released simultaneously to theaters and through video-on-demand services and that the film would be released on June 1 in the United States. The film was released on May 11, 2012, in the UK. In the United States, it received a limited release, showing in only 75 theaters.

=== Box office ===
The film made a small impact during its debut weekend in the United Kingdom, with receipts of just £242,889, placing it at number 8. A lower-budget film that was not a new release, Salmon Fishing in the Yemen, reached number 7. By the end of its limited run, it had earned a total UK box office of $688,269. It grossed $376,512 during its three-week run in the US. In total, Piranha 3DD grossed $8,493,728 worldwide.

=== Home media ===
The film was released in the United States in a 3D Blu-ray "combo pack", with both Blu-ray and DVD discs, with all three editions including digital copies, on September 4, 2012. In the United Kingdom, it was released on DVD and Blu-ray 3D (with a 2D Blu-ray version included) on September 3, 2012. The film was distributed earlier to rent via Redbox. The DVD is known as Piranha DD.

== Reception ==
On Rotten Tomatoes, Piranha 3DD holds an approval rating of 11% based on 53 reviews, with an average rating of 3.3/10. The website's critical consensus states: "It strains to up the gore and self-awareness of its predecessor, and—despite some game celebrity cameos—the result is a dispiriting echo of 2010's horror-comedy." On Metacritic, it has a weighted score of 24 out of 100 based on 13 reviews, indicating "generally unfavorable reviews".

Leslie Felperin of Variety gave the film a negative review, stating, "[The movie] ups the self-parody so much that it's practically a Wayans Brothers spoof, albeit with fewer jokes." Ben Rawson-Jones of Digital Spy gave the film a scathing review, with a rating of 1 out of 5 stars, and was highly critical of the use of 3D and the film's direction, despite his enjoyment of the previous film.
