= Clu Gulager =

Native American actor (1928–2022)

- Gulager in The Tall Man, 1960
- Born: William Martin Gulager; November 16, 1928; Holdenville, Oklahoma, U.S.
- Died: August 5, 2022 (aged 93); Los Angeles, California, U.S.
- Citizenship: Cherokee Nation • American
- Education: Northeastern State University; Baylor University
- Occupation: Actor
- Years active: 1947–2019
- Spouse: Miriam Byrd-Nethery (m. 1952; died 2003)
- Children: John Gulager; Tom Gulager
- Relatives: Will Rogers (first cousin once removed)

William Martin "Clu" Gulager (/ˈɡuːləɡər/; November 16, 1928 – August 5, 2022) was an American film and television actor.

Clu Gulager first became known for his work in television, appearing in the co-starring role of Billy the Kid in the 1960–1962 NBC television Western series The Tall Man and as Emmett Ryker in another NBC Western, The Virginian. He later had a second career as a horror film actor, including a lead part in Dan O'Bannon's The Return of the Living Dead (1985).

Gulager's first major film role was in Don Siegel's The Killers (1964), followed by a supporting part in the racing film Winning (1969); in Peter Bogdanovich's drama The Last Picture Show (1971); and opposite John Wayne in McQ (1974). He also directed the short film A Day with the Boys, which was nominated for the Short Film Palme d'Or at the 1969 Cannes Film Festival.

In the 1980s, Gulager appeared in several horror films, such as The Initiation (1984). In 2005, he appeared in the horror film Feast, and its sequels. He also appeared in the independent film Tangerine (2015) and in Quentin Tarantino's Once Upon a Time in Hollywood (2019), which was his final film role.

== Early life and education ==
Gulager was born in Holdenville, Oklahoma, on November 16, 1928, the son of John Delancy Gulager, who had been an actor before settling down to practice law in nearby Muskogee. His paternal grandmother, Martha Schrimsher Gulager, was a sister of Mary Schrimsher, the mother of Will Rogers, making Gulager and Rogers first cousins, once removed. He was Cherokee, having been an enrolled citizen of the Cherokee Nation.

His Cherokee nickname was given to him by his father for the clu-clu birds (known in English as martins, like his middle name) that were nesting at the Gulager home at the time of his birth. From 1946 to 1948, Gulager served in the United States Marine Corps at Camp Pendleton. After attending Northeastern State University in Tahlequah, Oklahoma, Gulager transferred to the Baptist-affiliated Baylor University in Waco, Texas, where he graduated. He won a one-year scholarship to study abroad in Paris, where he worked under Jean-Louis Barrault, a French actor and director.

== Career ==
In 1958 he appeared as Roy Carter in the episode "The Return of Roy Carter" (written by Gene Roddenberry, creator of Star Trek) in the CBS television Western series Have Gun – Will Travel starring Richard Boone.

Gulager stated, "Lew Wasserman saw me on a Playhouse 90 episode where I played an Elvis Presley–type character. I became the first contract player at Universal." In the spring of 1959, he signed with MCA-TV, where he appeared as Tommy Pavlock in the episode "The Immigrant" of NBC's series The Lawless Years, a 1920s crime drama. In the fall of 1959, he appeared in the episode "The Temple of the Swinging Doll" of NBC's short-lived espionage drama Five Fingers, starring David Hedison.

On June 3, 1959, he guest-starred as the unscrupulous photographer Elliott Garrison in "The Andrew Hale Story" on NBC's Wagon Train. On October 11, 1959, Gulager appeared as a U.S. Navy sailor in the "Appointment at Eleven" episode of Alfred Hitchcock Presents and again as an escaped convict in "Pen Pal" on November 1, 1960. On The Untouchables, he played the role of real-life vicious mob killer Vincent "Mad Dog" Coll. Gulager was hailed for his utterly chilling performance as the psychopathic Coll. Late in 1959, he was cast as Beau Chandler in the episode "Jessie Quinn" of the NBC Western series Riverboat, starring Darren McGavin and Burt Reynolds. The episode is a tale of intrigue involving the Texas Revolution. Capt. Holden attempts to send weapons to Sam Houston, but forces of Antonio López de Santa Anna in Mexico threaten to blow up Holden's vessel, the Enterprise.

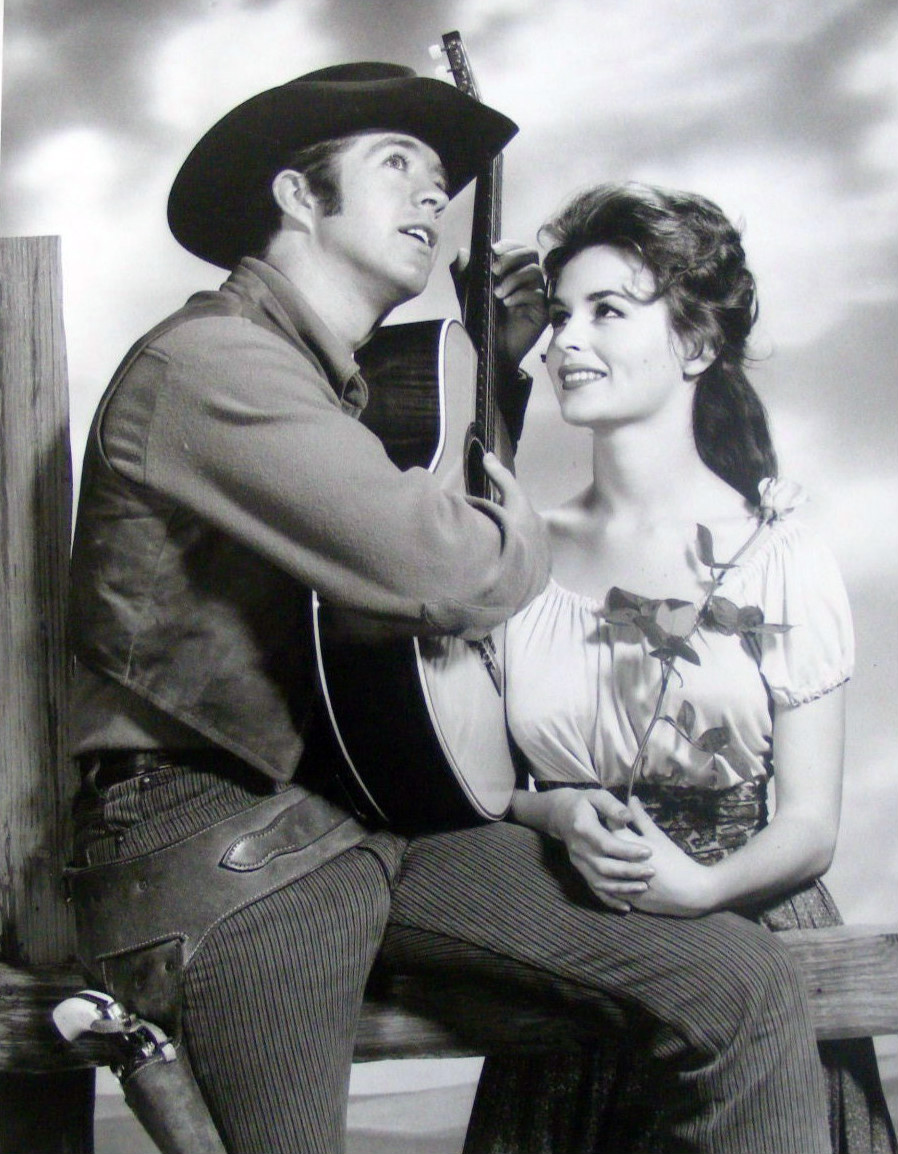
Gulager as Billy the Kid with Marianna Hill as his sweetheart, Rita, from the television program The Tall Man

From 1960 to 1962, Gulager played Billy the Kid in The Tall Man, opposite Barry Sullivan as Sheriff Pat Garrett. The episodes portray Billy as a sympathetic character without resorting to the "misunderstood young man" theme used in such films as The Outlaw (1943) and The Left Handed Gun (1958). In 1961, Gulager guest-starred in another NBC Western, Whispering Smith, Audie Murphy's only attempt at series television. Gulager portrayed Deputy Sheriff Emmett Ryker from 1964 to 1968 on The Virginian, the 90-minute Western series in which he starred with James Drury, Doug McClure, Lee J. Cobb, Roberta Shore, Randy Boone, Gary Clarke, and Diane Roter. Gulager appeared more than 60 times in other roles in film and television, including the film Winning (1969) and the CBS series Three for the Road. He also appeared several times on NBC's Bonanza. He starred with Lee Marvin, Ronald Reagan, John Cassavetes, and Angie Dickinson in The Killers (1964), teaming with Marvin as a pair of ruthless hit men. The Killers was intended to be one of the early made-for-TV movies as part of a Project 120 series of films that did not reach the airwaves, but NBC deemed it too violent for broadcast; Universal released the film theatrically instead.

In 1971, Gulager appeared in Peter Bogdanovich's The Last Picture Show. In 1977, long after his role on The Virginian, he appeared in an episode of Rod Taylor's unsuccessful NBC Western series The Oregon Trail. Gulager also played the boss of Susan Sarandon in a 1977 film drama, The Other Side of Midnight. In 1981, he co-starred as Angela Channing's long-suffering nephew Chase Gioberti, opposite Oscar-winner Jane Wyman, Lorenzo Lamas, William R. Moses, and Jamie Rose, in the pilot episode of The Vintage Years, which was later retooled as the primetime soap opera Falcon Crest. When he was not rehired to continue with his role, Robert Foxworth took over the role until his firing in 1987.

In 1983, he starred opposite Richard Thomas in the NBC TV movie Living Proof: The Hank Williams Jr. Story. He was cast as Burt Wilson in 1985 in Dan O'Bannon's The Return of the Living Dead. He was also a featured player in director John Landis' darkly comedic 1985 film noir satire, Into the Night, a film rife with insider Hollywood cameos, as an FBI agent who is a courier of a cache of clandestine funds, which he grudgingly delivers to secure the safety of the film's two romantic leads (Michelle Pfeiffer and Jeff Goldblum).

In 2005, Gulager appeared as a shotgun-toting bartender in Feast, followed by the film's two sequels, Feast II: Sloppy Seconds (2008), and Feast III: The Happy Finish (2009), all of which were directed by his son, John. He also had a minor role in the critically acclaimed independent film Tangerine (2015). He had a role in the 2012 film Piranha 3DD. Gulager's final screen performance was as a book store owner in Quentin Tarantino's Once Upon a Time in Hollywood in 2019.

== Personal life ==
On June 19, 1952, he married actress Miriam Byrd-Nethery. The couple had two sons, including filmmaker John Gulager, and remained married until her death in 2003.

=== Death ===
Aged 93, Gulager died of natural causes at the Los Angeles home of his son John on August 5, 2022.

== Filmography ==
=== Film ===
Year	Title	Role	Notes
1964	The Killers	Lee	
1966	And Now Miguel	Johnny	
1969	Winning	Larry	
1969	A Day with the Boys	—	Short film; as director
1971	The Last Picture Show	Abilene	
1972	Molly and Lawless John	Deputy Tom Clements	
1974	McQ	Toms	
1974	Hit Lady	Roarke	
1974	Gangsterfilmen	Glenn Mortenson	
1977	The Other Side of Midnight	Bill Fraser	
1979	A Force of One	Dunne	
1983	Lies	Doctor Bartlett	
1984	Chattanooga Choo Choo	Sam	
1984	The Initiation	Dwight Fairchild	
1985	Into the Night	Federal Agent	
1985	Prime Risk	Paul Minsky	
1985	The Return of the Living Dead	Burt Wilson	
1985	A Nightmare on Elm Street 2: Freddy's Revenge	Mr. Walsh	
1986	Hunter's Blood	Mason Rand	
1987	From a Whisper to a Scream	Stanley Burnside	Original title: The Offspring
1987	The Hidden	Lieutenant Ed Flynn	
1987	Summer Heat	Will	
1988	Tapeheads	Norman Mart	
1988	I'm Gonna Git You Sucka	Lieutenant Baker	
1988	Teen Vamp	The Reverend	
1988	Uninvited	Albert	
1990	Dan Turner, Hollywood Detective	Desk Sergeant	
1990	The Willies	Greeley Principal	
1991	My Heroes Have Always Been Cowboys	Dark Glasses	
1992	Eddie Presley	Sid	
1993	Killing Device	Smitty	
1994	Puppet Master 5: The Final Chapter	Man No. 1	
1999	Gunfighter	Uncle Buck Peters	
1999	Palmer's Pick-Up	Jeb	
2005	Feast	Bartender	
2006	Vic	Vic Reeves	Short film
2008	Feast II: Sloppy Seconds	Bartender	
2009	Feast III: The Happy Finish	Bartender	
2012	Piranha 3DD	Mo	
2015	Tangerine	The Cherokee	
2015	Director's Commentary: Terror of Frankenstein	Gavin Merrill (voice)	
2016	Blue Jay	Waynie	
2018	Children of the Corn: Runaway	Crusty	
2018	Give Til It Hurts	Mr. Lawson	
2019	Once Upon a Time in Hollywood	Book Store Owner	

=== Television ===
Year	Title	Role	Notes
1956	The United States Steel Hour	Danny	Episode: "Bang the Drum Slowly"
1956	Goodyear Playhouse	Terrible	Episode: "Stardust II"
1957	Studio One in Hollywood	Lloyd Carpenter	Episode: "Walk Down the Hill"
1957	The Alcoa Hour	James Wesley	Episode: "15 October 1864"
1959	Black Saddle	Andy Meade	Episode: "Client: Meade"
1959	Playhouse 90	Zach	Episode: "The Day Before Atlanta"
1959	Westinghouse Desilu Playhouse	Young Vix	Episode: "The Day the Town Stood Up"
1959	Laramie	Private Gil Brady	Episode: "Fugitive Road"
1959	The Untouchables	Vincent "Mad Dog" Coll	Vincent "Mad Dog" Coll
1959	The Lawless Years	Tommy Pavolock	Episode: "The Immigrant"
1959	Have Gun – Will Travel	Roy Carter	Episode: "Return of Roy Carter"
1959	Wanted Dead or Alive	Joe Collins	Episode: "Crossroads"
1959–62	Alfred Hitchcock Presents	Sailor / Rod Collins / Jimmy K. Bresson	3 episodes
1959–64	Wagon Train	Various	5 episodes
1960	The Rebel	Virgil Taber	Episode: "Paint a House with Scarlet"
1960–62	The Tall Man	Billy the Kid	75 episodes
1963–68	The Virginian	Jake Carewe / Jud / Emmet Ryker	Guest; 2 episodes Main cast; Seasons 3-6
1964	Kraft Suspense Theatre	Dan Walsh	Episode: "The Deep End"
1964	Dr. Kildare	Dr. Norman Gage	2 episodes
1968–73	Ironside	Frank Clinton / D.W. Donnelly / Jack Brody	3 episodes
1969	The Survivors	Senator Mark Jennings	Episode: "Chapter Twelve"
1970	San Francisco International Airport	Bob Hatten	3 episodes
1971	The F.B.I.	Lyle Chernik	2 episodes
1971–75	Cannon	B.J. Long / Burdick / Jonathan Quill	3 episodes
1972	Bonanza	Billy Brenner	Episode: "Stallion"
1972	The Mod Squad	Dustin Ellis	Episode: "Another Final Game"
1972	Medical Center	Jack	Episode: "The Choice"
1972–76	Hawaii Five-O	Arthur Lambert / Jack Gulley	2 episodes
1973	Mannix	Kyle Foster	Episode: The Man Who Wasn't There
1973	Kung Fu	Sheriff Rutledge	Episode: "Blood Brother"
1973	Walt Disney's Wonderful World of Color	Keith Raynor	The Mystery in Dracula's Castle (Part 1–2)
1973–76	Barnaby Jones	Sheriff Mack Hollister / Mark Landy	2 episodes
1974	Shaft	Richard Quayle	Episode: "The Murder Machine"
1974	Get Christie Love!	Sheriff Burl Taggert	Episode: "Highway to Murder"
1974–75	Police Story	Officer Williams / Tim Keegan	2 episodes
1975	McCloud	Johnny Monahan	Episode: "Lady on the Run"
1975	The Streets of San Francisco	Inspector George Turner	Episode: "Poison Snow"
1976	Ellery Queen	Father Terrence Devlin / Captain Thomas G. Horton	2 episodes
1976	Once an Eagle	Alvin Merrick	Recurring role
1979	The MacKenzies of Paradise Cove	Cuda Weber	6 episodes
1981	Falcon Crest	Chase Gioberti	Episode: "Unaired Pilot"
1982	Quincy, M.E.	Larry Krushevitz	Episode: "For Love of Joshua"
1982	CHiPs	Stoler	Episode: "The Game of War"
1982–86	The Fall Guy	Col. Halston / Osborne / Marv Jackson	3 episodes
1983	Automan	Rudolph Brock	Episode: "The Great Pretender"
1984	The Master	Mr. Christensen	Episode: "Max"
1985	Street Hawk	Will Gassner	Episode: "Fire on the Wing"
1985	Knight Rider	Eugene Hanson	Episode: "Buy Out"
1986	Airwolf	Cullen Dixon	Episode: "Day of Jeopardy"
1986	Magnum, P.I.	Theo Wolf	Episode: "Way of the Stalking Horse"
1986	Simon & Simon	Nathan Sloan	Episode: "The Manual"
1985–87	Murder, She Wrote	Ray Carter / Mike Gann / Carl Mestin	3 episodes
1988	MacGyver	Walt Kirby	Episode: "Thin Ice"
1995	Kung Fu: The Legend Continues	Deputy Clay Hardin	Episode: "Gunfighters"
1995	Beavis and Butt-Head	Anderson's War Buddy (voice)	Episode: "What's the Deal?"
1995	Walker, Texas Ranger	Duke Jamison	Episode: "Final Justice"
1996	Dr. Quinn, Medicine Woman	Art McKendrick	Episode: "Medicine Man"

==== TV films and miniseries ====
Year	Title	Role	Notes
1967	Sullivan's Empire	Juan Clemente	
1972	The Glass House	Officer Cortland	
1972	Footsteps	Jonas Kane	
1973	Call to Danger	Emmet Jergens	
1974	Smile Jenny, You're Dead	Detective Milt Bosworth	
1974	Houston, We've Got a Problem	Lou Matthews	
1977	Charlie Cobb: a Nice Night for a Hanging	Charles Cobb	
1978	A Question of Love	Mike Guettner	
1979	Willa	Joe Welch	
1980	Kenny Rogers as The Gambler	Rufe Bennett	
1980	Skyward	Steve Ward	
1983	Living Proof: The Hank Williams Jr. Story	J.R. Smith	
1985	Bridge Across Time	Peter Dawson	Also known as: Terror at London Bridge
1986	North and South, Book II	Maj. General Philip Sheridan	
1993	In the Line of Duty: Ambush in Waco	McLennan County Sheriff	

=== Documentary appearances ===
Year	Title	Role	Notes
2019	Scream, Queen! My Nightmare on Elm Street	Himself	Documentary film

== Awards and nominations ==
- The Virginian (TV series) (1966) Bronze Wrangler Award for Best Fictional Television Drama ensemble cast
- A Day with the Boys (1969) (director, short film) Nominated Palme d'Or — Cannes Film Festival "Best Short Film"
- Hunter's Blood (1986) Nominated Saturn Award "Best Supporting Actor"
- Gulager is one of several "Oklahoma Walk of Fame" members represented on medallions in front of Tulsa's Circle Cinema.
