= Martin Klebba =

American actor (born 1969)

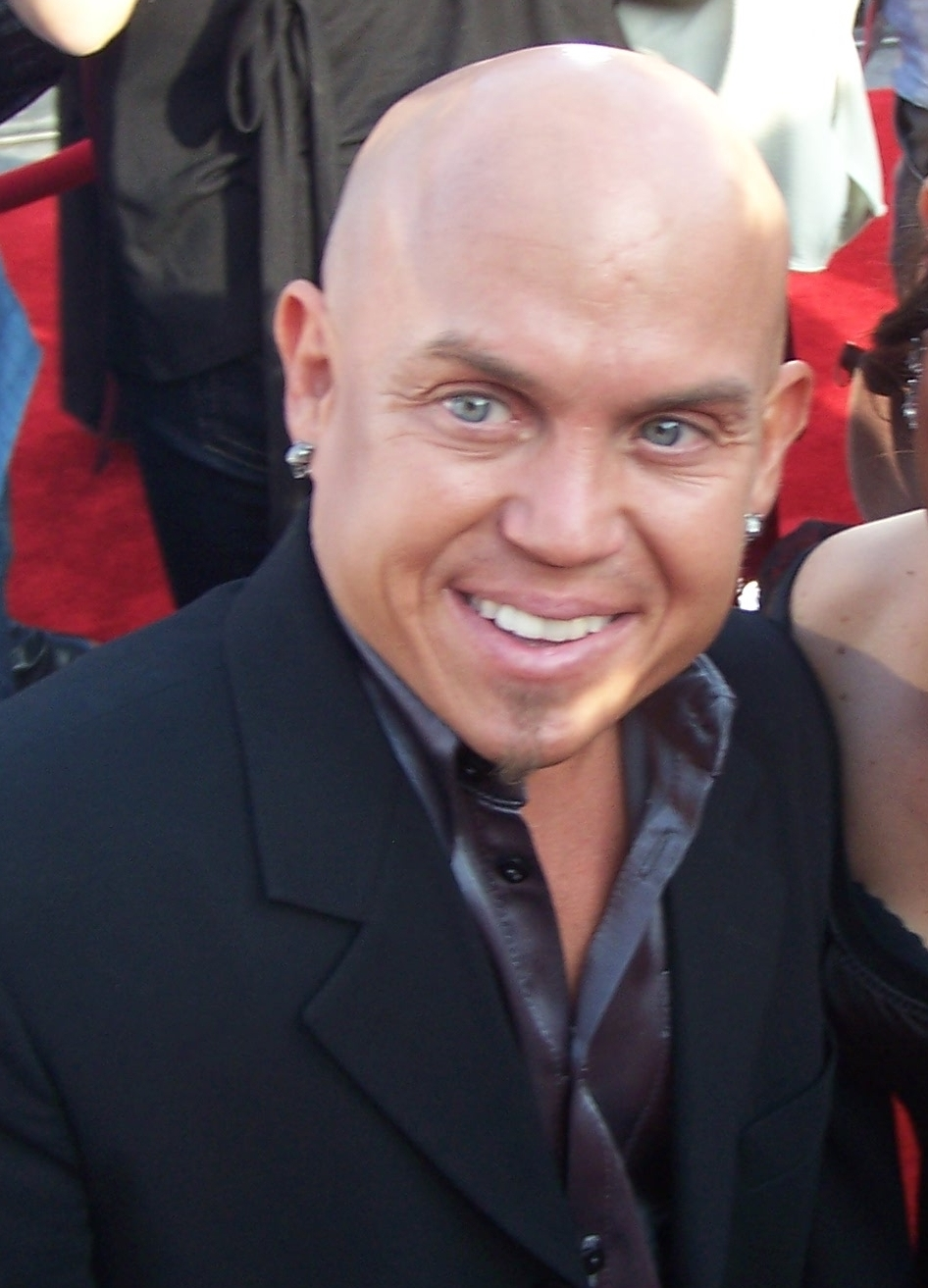
- Klebba in 2007
- Born: June 23, 1969 (age 57); Troy, Michigan, U.S.
- Education: Athens High School
- Occupations: Actor; stunt performer
- Years active: 1983–present
- Height: 3 ft 11 in (119 cm)
- Spouse: Michelle Dilgard
- Children: 2

Martin Klebba (born June 23, 1969 or 1970) is an American actor and stunt performer. He has a form of dwarfism called acromicric dysplasia; he is 4 feet 1 inch (1.24 m). Klebba is best known for his role as Marty in the Pirates of the Caribbean franchise. He had his first role in a cameo in Tim Burton's Planet of the Apes (2001).

== Early life ==
Klebba was born and grew up in Troy, Michigan, graduating from Athens High School.

Klebba runs a nonprofit foundation called Coalition for Dwarf Advocacy, which gives 100% of its donations to the cause of helping people with dwarfism.

== Career ==
=== Early career ===
Klebba was an occasional guest on The Howard Stern Show in the 1990s and early 2000s, and was given the nickname "Marty the Midget".

=== Film ===
Klebba has acted in various productions, most notably the Pirates of the Caribbean series as Marty, a dwarf pirate member of Jack Sparrow's crew. The character was originally named "Dirk", but someone, possibly director Gore Verbinski, named the character after Klebba. First appearing in Pirates of the Caribbean: The Curse of the Black Pearl, Klebba reprised the role in the sequels Dead Man's Chest, At World's End, and Dead Men Tell No Tales. On the role, Klebba was quoted in saying he is a normal man who fell into the franchise, one stunt turned into four out of five films.

In 2003, Klebba played the ring announcer in Cradle 2 the Grave. In 2009, Klebba played the role of "Count Le Petite" in All's Faire in Love, a romantic comedy set at a Renaissance fair. He has also been in low budget horror/comedy films Feast II: Sloppy Seconds and Feast III: The Happy Finish as Thunder.

He has numerous stunt credits as well including Hancock, Zombieland, Bedtime Stories, Evan Almighty, Meet the Spartans, Epic Movie, and Van Helsing. Wearing motion capture pajamas, Klebba stood in for the Dimorphodon who grapples with Owen Grady in Jurassic World.

=== Television ===
Klebba starred as Friday, one of the seven dwarfs, in the 2001 television film Snow White: The Fairest of Them All. In 2003, Klebba starred as Hank Dingo in the Comedy Central television film Knee High P.I.. He also made an appearance as a demon in the Charmed episode "Witch Wars" (2004). He has also appeared in iCarly and Drake & Josh as Nug Nug.

Klebba made many appearances as Randall Winston in the television series Scrubs. He starred in the CSI: Crime Scene Investigation episode "The Chick Chop Flick Shop" (2007) as Dickie Jones and in the CSI: NY episode "Uncertainty Rules" (2010) as Calvin Moore. Also in 2010, Klebba guest starred as Hibachi in Pair of Kings, a Disney TV series. He played Todd Moore in the Bones episode "Dwarf in the Dirt" (2010).

Klebba has also been featured on the TLC reality show, Little People, Big World, with his friend Amy Roloff. He and his wife are featured in one episode of VH-1's I'm Married to a....

In 2011, Klebba appeared on The Cape as a series regular named "Rollo". He also appeared once again as one of the Seven Dwarfs in Mirror Mirror (2012).

In 2025, Klebba provided the voice and facial capture for Grumpy, one of the seven dwarfs, in the 2025 remake of Snow White.

=== Music videos ===
Klebba appears as the "New Year Baby" in the music video for "Truth" by the South African rock band, Seether.

== Filmography ==
Key
| † | Denotes films that have not yet been released |

=== Film ===
| Year | Title | Role | Notes |
|---|---|---|---|
| 2001 | Planet of the Apes | Monkey Grinder's Pet | Uncredited role |
| 2001 | Corky Romano | Mini Bouncer | Uncredited role |
| 2001 | How High | Party Guest | Uncredited role |
| 2002 | Run Ronnie Run | Music Video Doorman | |
| 2002 | Big Fat Liar | Kissing Bandit | Uncredited role |
| 2002 | Death to Smoochy | Rhinette / Krinkle Kid #3 | |
| 2002 | Men in Black II | Family Child Alien | |
| 2002 | Austin Powers in Goldmember | Dancer | Uncredited role |
| 2002 | Blood Shot | Secret Weapon | Short film |
| 2003 | National Security | Security Guard | Uncredited role |
| 2003 | Cradle 2 the Grave | Fight Announcer | |
| 2003 | Pirates of the Caribbean: The Curse of the Black Pearl | Marty | |
| 2003 | El Matador | Me Too | |
| 2003 | A Light in the Forest | Boar | |
| 2003 | Looney Tunes: Back in Action | Dancing Yosemite Sam | |
| 2003 | The Haunted Mansion | Pickwick | Uncredited role |
| 2004 | Van Helsing | Dwerger | Uncredited role |
| 2005 | Americano | Matador | |
| 2006 | Pirates of the Caribbean: Dead Man's Chest | Marty | |
| 2007 | Pirates of the Caribbean: At World's End | Marty | |
| 2007 | Cougar Club | Short Boss Man | Uncredited role |
| 2007 | The Santa Trap | Special Ops Elf | |
| 2008 | Hancock | Prisoner | Uncredited role |
| 2008 | Feast II: Sloppy Seconds | Thunder | Direct-to-video |
| 2009 | Feast III: The Happy Finish | Thunder | Direct-to-video |
| 2009 | American High School | Principal Mann | Direct-to-video |
| 2009 | All's Faire in Love | Count Le Petit | |
| 2010 | A Short Film | Cowboy | Short film |
| 2011 | Night of the Little Dead | Little Dead | Short film |
| 2011 | In the Gray | – | Producer only |
| 2012 | Project X | Dwarf Partygoer | Credited as Angry Little Person |
| 2012 | Mirror Mirror | Butcher | |
| 2013 | Movie 43 | Killer Chaun | |
| 2013 | Oz the Great and Powerful | Nikko | |
| 2013 | Blood Shot | Marud | |
| 2014 | The Hungover Games | Fruito | |
| 2014 | The Bag Man | Guano | |
| 2014 | Left Behind | Melvin Weir | |
| 2015 | Jurassic World | Dimorphodon | |
| 2015 | Ted 2 | Chucky Cosplayer | |
| 2016 | Range 15 | Zombie Klebba | |
| 2016 | All Hallows' Eve | Barnaby | |
| 2017 | Eloise | Mental Patient | |
| 2017 | Pirates of the Caribbean: Dead Men Tell No Tales | Marty | |
| 2019 | Viy 2: Journey to China | Captain | |
| 2025 | The Electric State | Herman, Milkman Bot | Motion capture |
| 2025 | Snow White | Grumpy | Voice and facial motion capture |

=== Television ===
| Year | Title | Role | Notes |
|---|---|---|---|
| 1998 | Charmed | Bar Guest | Episode: "Witch Wars" |
| 2001 | The Andy Dick Show | Chim Chim | Episode: "Andy Land" |
| 2001 | Malcolm in the Middle | Circus Barker | Episode: "Carnival" (uncredited) |
| 2001 | Snow White: The Fairest of Them All | Friday | Television film |
| 2002 | Just Shoot Me! | Village Person #3 | Episode: "The Boys in the Band" |
| 2002 | Mad TV | Rich | Season 7, Episode 25 |
| 2003 | Andy Richter Controls the Universe | Little Andy | Episode: "Crazy in Rio" (uncredited) |
| 2003 | Cedric the Entertainer Presents | Dancer | Episode 10 |
| 2004–2009 | Scrubs | Randall Winston | 8 episodes |
| 2007 | Drake & Josh | Nug Nut | Episode: "Battle of Panthatar" |
| 2007 | CSI: Crime Scene Investigation | Dickie Jones | S:8 E:5 The Chick Chop Flick Shop |
| 2008 | Frances | Frances (motion capture) | Main role |
| 2009 | Bones | Todd Moore | Episode: "The Dwarf in The Dirt" |
| 2010 | Boardwalk Empire | Boxing Dwarf | Episode: "Boardwalk Empire". Uncredited role |
| 2011 | Pair of Kings | Hibachi | 3 episodes |
| 2011 | The Cape | Rollo | Main role; 10 episodes |
| 2016 | The Thundermans | Troll | Episode: "Happy Heroween" |
| 2021–2022 | Pacific Rim: The Black | Spyder (voice) | Recurring role; 6 episodes |
| 2026 | Ted | Merchant | Episode: "Dungeons & Dealers" |
