= Feast III: The Happy Finish =

- DVD cover
- Directed by: John Gulager
- Written by: Marcus Dunstan; Patrick Melton
- Produced by: Michael Leahy
- Starring: Jenny Wade; Clu Gulager; Diane Ayala Goldner; Josh Blue; Martin Klebba; Carl Anthony Payne; Tom Gulager; Hanna Putnam; Juan Longoria Garcia; William Prael; John Allen Nelson; Craig Henningsen
- Cinematography: Kevin Atkinson
- Edited by: Kirk Morri
- Music by: Steve Edwards
- Distributed by: Dimension Extreme
- Release date: February 17, 2009
- Running time: 77 minutes
- Country: United States
- Language: English

Feast III: The Happy Finish is a 2009 American horror comedy film and the third and final installment of the Feast trilogy. The film was released directly to DVD on February 17, 2009.

== Plot ==
Honey Pie is mauled and beheaded by a monster, which quickly digests and excretes her head. Lightning survived the explosion near him and stumbles off. The remaining survivors (Biker Queen, Tat Girl, Tit Girl, Secrets, Bartender, Slasher, and Greg, now with a pipe lodged in his head) are then attacked by monsters on the roof of the building where they are hiding. Thunder is seen still alive and crawling away after being disemboweled but is run over by a man named Shitkicker.

Shitkicker smashes open the front door of the police station and enters. The rooftop survivors make their way to the jail, where Hobo attempts to kill them but gets beaten by the biker girls. Greg reveals that Slasher has a lot of used cars that the survivors can use to escape. Shitkicker is accidentally shot in the head by Secrets. The gunshot alerts the monsters, who enter the police station. The group then decides to run to the used car lot.

Once they exit, Slasher runs a different way from the group and then trips Hobo as a distraction for the monsters. While a monster begins to eat one of Hobo's legs, Slasher runs towards a metal storage unit. The monster lets Hobo go and resumes going after Slasher, who is joined by Tat and Tit Girl of the biker women. Inside the unit, they meet about a dozen survivors who proceed to gang up and beat Slasher for ripping them off with his car deals. Slasher moves to the back of the unit and stands against the back wall. A monster spots a hole Slasher is standing in front of and uses the hole to rape Slasher, impregnating him. A monster then immediately bursts through Slasher's stomach, giving birth to a Slasher hybrid, killing the dozen survivors inside the unit. Meanwhile, Secrets, Greg, and Bartender find the wounded Lightning and take him with them. Biker Queen frees the biker girls, and they run from the Slasher/monster hybrid. They follow Hobo down a hole in an attempt to hide inside his buried school bus/meth lab.

Monsters follow them and kill Tit Girl. Biker Queen is finally able to get the bus started, and as they leave, Tat Girl sets Hobo and a monster on fire, who then fall out of the back of the bus. The bus emerges from underground with Biker Queen and Tat Girl intending to abandon the remaining survivors; however, the bus dies just as the other survivors catch up. The monsters immediately swarm the bus, but the group is saved by a man named Short Bus Gus, who seemingly has the ability to repel the monsters. He then leads the survivors into the sewers in an attempt to reach the big city. While working their way through the sewers, Tat Girl is killed by infected townies. The survivors are about to be killed by the infected until another survivor known as Jean Claude Segal saves them. Jean Claude tries to lead the survivors to the surface when he is attacked by a monster and has one of his arms bitten off. The survivors are then separated into two groups, Jean Claude and Bartender, and Biker Queen, Secrets, Greg, Lightning, and Short Bus Gus. While trying to cauterize one of Jean Claude's wounds, Bartender accidentally blows off his remaining arm.

The other group of survivors finds the Hive, which is a gigantic rave with infected townies and monsters who spew their vomit on the people, causing horrible mutation and insanity. The survivors are reunited, but are spotted by an infected townie and Biker Queen is infected. Jean Claude volunteers to stay behind to fight off infected townies to give the survivors a chance to escape. Jean Claude manages to fend off the infected townies for a short while before being ripped in half.

Short Bus Gus finds out that it has been his malfunctioning hearing aid that has been repelling the monsters and is impaled by a monster. The Slasher monster finally catches up with the group and kills the attacking monster and then forcibly removes the pipe lodged in Greg's head, killing him. Secrets is insane with grief and savagely attacks the Slasher/monster hybrid, killing him with the same pipe that was lodged in Greg's head.

Biker Queen takes off with one of the monsters, setting off its internal alarm system in an attempt to draw the monsters away from the remaining survivors. Bartender tells Secrets and Lightning that they are the only survivors left and that they have to repopulate now. Secrets looks up just as the foot of a giant robot crushes her, as well as Lightning, and walks away. The movie ends when a Mexican guitarist comes out of nowhere who then summarizes the entire Feast trilogy storyline in song and music. In the post-credit scene, Bartender slowly walks towards the camera and murmurs "Goddamn it".

== Cast ==
- Jenny Wade as Honey Pie
- Clu Gulager as Bartender
- Diane Ayala Goldner as Biker Queen
- Josh Blue as Short Bus Gus
- Martin Klebba as Thunder
- Carl Anthony Payne as Slasher
- Tom Gulager as Greg Swank
- Hanna Putnam as Secrets
- Juan Longoria Garcia as Lightning
- William Prael as Hobo
- John Allen Nelson as Shitkicker
- Craig Henningsen as Jean Claude Segal
- Chelsea Richards as Tat Girl
- Melissa Reed as Tit Girl

== Reception ==
Steve Barton of Bloody Disgusting rated Feast III: The Happy Finish 3/5 stars, noting that while it may not be as wild as the second film, it is "still one hell of a good ride". Brad Miska of Bloody Disgusting gave it a 4/5 star rating, stating: "While Feast II felt nothing like the first film, Feast III somehow managed to recapture the entire aesthetics of the original".
