= The Collector (2009 film) =

- Theatrical release poster
- Directed by: Marcus Dunstan
- Screenplay by: Patrick Melton; Marcus Dunstan
- Based on: The Midnight Man (Note: Although not stated in the film's credits, the Writers Guild of America lists the film as being based on "a screenplay" by the same writers, referring that the earlier script they shopped around, titled The Midnight Man, was considered as a separate project.) by: Patrick Melton; Marcus Dunstan
- Produced by: Brett Forbes; Patrick Rizzotti; Julie Richardson
- Starring: Josh Stewart; Michael Reilly Burke; Andrea Roth; Juan Fernandez; Karley Scott Collins; Madeline Zima; Robert Wisdom
- Cinematography: Brandon Cox
- Edited by: Alex Luna; James Mastracco; Howard Smith
- Music by: Jerome Dillon
- Production companies: LD Entertainment; Fortress Features; Imaginarium Entertainment Group
- Distributed by: Freestyle Releasing
- Release date: July 31, 2009
- Running time: 90 minutes
- Country: United States
- Language: English
- Budget: $3 million
- Box office: $10.5 million

The Collector is a 2009 American horror film written by Patrick Melton and Marcus Dunstan, and directed by Dunstan. It stars Josh Stewart, alongside Michael Reilly Burke, Andrea Roth, Juan Fernandez, Karley Scott Collins, Madeline Zima, and Robert Wisdom. The film follows handyman Arkin O'Brien (Stewart) who, in order to pay a debt, decides to rob a house, only to find out somebody with far more sinister intentions has already broken in and rigged it with multiple traps.

The original script, titled The Midnight Man, was at one point shopped as a spin-off prequel to the Saw franchise, as an origin story for the villain John Kramer / Jigsaw. The producers opposed the idea and dismissed it, but the strength of the script led to writers Marcus Dunstan and Patrick Melton writing multiple Saw films.

The Collector was released on July 31, 2009, by Freestyle Releasing. It received generally negative reviews from critics and grossed $10.2 million against a $3 million budget. A sequel, The Collection, was released theatrically on November 30, 2012.

== Plot ==
One night a married couple, Larry and Gena Wharton, return home and discover a large trunk upstairs. Opening it, they are horrified by its contents before being attacked by an unseen assailant.

Former convict Arkin O'Brien works as a handyman for the Chase family. After work, he meets his wife, whose debt to loan sharks is due by midnight. To protect her and their daughter Cindy, Arkin plans to steal a valuable ruby from the Chase home. He breaks into the home to find the house eerily quiet before making his way to the vault. Upon hearing footsteps, Arkin hides before finding Michael, the father of the Chase family, who is badly injured. Michael then triggers a trap and is dragged into the basement by a masked man. Arkin attempts to call 911, but the phone is rigged with a spike that punctures his ear. He also discovers that the windows have been boarded up and lined with razors, making escape impossible.

Arkin retreats to the basement and finds Michael, who informs him that his wife Victoria has also been captured, his older daughter Jill is out, and younger daughter Hannah is hiding in the house. Michael gives Arkin the combination to the safe, which contains a gun. He also finds Victoria and promises her that he'll find Hannah and asking her to yell so that he can go back upstairs while the masked man comes down. Arkin grabs the gun and pockets the ruby before hearing noises coming from the closet. He finds a trunk containing a bloodied Larry. Larry explains that the masked man is a "collector" of people and that he only collects one person from a household while killing everyone else. Horrified, Arkin flees and discovers that Michael is now dead, having been hung upside down and disemboweled. Arkin goes back downstairs and frees Victoria. She is repeatedly stabbed by the Collector when she attempts to flee upon seeing Michael's remains and is tortured to death.

Jill arrives home with her boyfriend Chad. The Collector attacks Chad with a knife and he is killed when he is pushed into a room filled with bear traps. Jill manages to make a 911 call before being captured. Arkin frees Jill, only for her to be killed by a trap when she grabs a rigged pair of scissors. Arkin removes the boards and escapes through the upstairs windows, but sees Hannah in another room upstairs calling for help. He sees The Collector notice her as well. Changing his mind, he reenters the house and manages to rescue Hannah before the Collector captures her. The two prepare a trap to electrocute the Collector, but the trap kills Larry instead. Arkin sends Hannah down a laundry chute to the basement to hide before the Collector captures and brutally tortures him in the basement.

A police officer responding to Jill's 911 call arrives only to be killed by the Collector. Arkin frees himself and discovers a dead Victoria and armed explosives in the basement. After killing the Collector's dog and trapping the Collector in one of his own traps, Arkin escapes with Hannah. He runs into the road to get the attention of police cars and is hit by one of the cars. He sees Hannah being carried away by the police and tells them that the Collector was an exterminator working at the Chase house. The explosives detonate, but the Collector gets away unharmed. While Arkin is being taken to the hospital, the Collector ambushes the ambulance and kills everyone except Arkin, whom he kidnaps and places in the red trunk.

In a post-credits scene, the Collector watches film slides while sitting on the trunk containing Arkin, who threatens to kill him.

== Cast ==
- Josh Stewart as Arkin O'Brien
- Michael Reilly Burke as Michael Chase
- Andrea Roth as Victoria Chase
- Juan Fernández as the Collector
- Karley Scott Collins as Hannah Chase
- Daniella Alonso as Lisa O'Brien
- Haley Alexis Pullos as Cindy O'Brien
- William Prael as Larry Wharton
- Diane Ayala Goldner as Gena Wharton
- Alex Feldman as Chad
- Madeline Zima as Jill Chase
- Robert Wisdom as Roy

== Release ==
The Collector was theatrically released by Freestyle Releasing on July 31, 2009, in the United States, and on DVD on April 6, 2010. A rental version was made available February 12, 2010, through Blockbuster Video's Exclusive Line. The DVD includes two deleted scenes, and also an alternative ending which is Arkin leaving after seeing Hannah in the window – thus cutting off the remaining 25 minutes of the film.

== Reception ==
=== Box office ===
In the United States and Canada, The Collector was released alongside Aliens in the Attic and Funny People, and grossed $1.3 million on its opening day. The film debuted with $3.6 million from 1,325 theaters in its opening weekend, finishing in 11th place. The film made $1.3 million in its second weekend, experiencing a 64.3% drop and finishing 15th. The Collector finished its domestic run with $7.7 million.

=== Critical response ===
Review aggregator Rotten Tomatoes reported that 29% of 76 critics were positive, with an average rating of 4.3/10. The site's critics consensus reads, "Increasingly tedious displays of gore makes this torture porn home-invasion-horror more programmatic than provocative." On Metacritic, the film has a weighted average score of 29 out of 100, based on 11 critics, indicating "generally unfavorable reviews".

Clay Cane of BET noted that, "You will squirm, but aren't we getting a bit desensitized to these routine torture flicks? It's like seeing a pop songstress get naked for the billionth time – yeah, she's hot, but we have all seen it before." Bloody Disgusting gave the film a 3.5/5 and wrote that The Collector is "a raw, gritty and uncompromising horror film that puts the previous Saw film to shame." The reviewer also believed that the character of the Collector had the potential to become a new horror icon.

== Sequels ==
Speaking about a sequel, Patrick Melton said in an interview:

I didn't think it necessarily would happen because while the movie did well for its budget, it certainly wasn't a blockbuster, but it did well enough that the film's producer, Mickey Liddell, wants to make a sequel and of course wants me and Marcus to be involved again. So we are seeing if we can work out some sort of a deal for us to write it and for Marcus to direct, but right now it's just in the deal stage. It is a possibility. I couldn't imagine it being made without Marcus directing it."

Shooting on the second film, The Collection, began in October 2010, and the film was released on November 30, 2012. Josh Stewart reprised his role as Arkin.

On May 2, 2019, Josh Stewart tweeted that another sequel titled The Collected, stylized as The Coll3cted, was happening along with a poster.

In April 2021, writers Marcus Dunstan and Patrick Melton admitted that the third film may not happen due to "creative disinterest" from producers and many of the props being stolen.

Marcus Dunstan stated in an interview on June 6, 2022 that he still intends to finish the project. In July 2024, Dunstan confirmed that "legal entanglements" had been resolved and the project would move forward.

== See also ==
- List of films featuring psychopaths and sociopaths
- List of films featuring home invasions
