= Full Grown Men =

- Theatrical release poster
- Directed by: David Munro
- Written by: David Munro; Xandra Castleton
- Produced by: Brian Benson; Xandra Castleton; Alan Cumming; David Ilku; David Munro; Paul Zaentz; Sheila B. Ennis; Donna Garrison; Lawrence Lippman; Scott Karpf; Todd Tiberi
- Starring: Matt McGrath; Judah Friedlander; Alan Cumming; Amy Sedaris; Deborah Harry
- Cinematography: Frank G. DeMarco
- Edited by: Alex Blatt; Affonso Gonçalves
- Music by: Charlie Campbell
- Release date: April 27, 2006
- Running time: 78 minutes
- Country: United States
- Language: English

Full Grown Men is a 2006 American independent comedy-drama film directed by David Munro and starring Matt McGrath, Judah Friedlander, Alan Cumming, Amy Sedaris, and Deborah Harry. It is the bittersweet story of a thirtysomething man with family who grudgingly realizes it is time to trade adolescence for adulthood. The film won the 2007 indieWIRE Undiscovered Gems Film Series Audience Award competition.

== Plot ==
Alby Cutrera is a pathologically nostalgic guy who, at 35 years of age with a wife and young son, really just wishes he could ride his Schwinn 5 speed around all day on a Cherry Slurpee high. His wife Suzanne and son Josh love him because he's funny and creative but Suzanne finally loses patience with Alby and kicks him out of the house.

Alby moves back to Mom's house and looks up his old best friend from childhood, Elias Guber. The two take a trip to Diggityland, a theme park up in central Florida that was their favorite place as kids. Elias is going there to get an award for his work as a special-ed teacher, a decidedly grown-up occupation, while Alby needs a ride up the coast to sell his precious action figures to a collectibles broker – a move he thinks will reinstate him in the good graces of his family and signal his transition into adulthood.

== Cast ==
Actor	Role
Matt McGrath	Alby Cutrera
Judah Friedlander	Elias Guber
Alan Cumming	The Hitchhiker
Deborah Harry	Beauty
Amy Sedaris	Trina
Katie Kreisler	Suzanne Cutrera
Richard Lozano/Steven Lozano	Josh Cutrera
Joie Lee	Annie
Jerry Grayson	Mr. Tinsman
Benjamin Karpf	Rollie
Jim Fyfe	Night Manager
David Ilku	Pool Man
Zully Montero	Teya Darwin Sealey Bus Driver
Peter Donald Badalamenti II	Bert
Nadia da Silva	Mrs Cutrera

== Festival screenings ==
- Gene Siskel Film Center Chicago Indie Comedy Sneak Preview! June 22–25, 2007
- Provincetown International Film Festival June 15–16, 2007
- Florida Film Festival Orlando, Florida March 30–31, 2007
- Miami International Film Festival March 9–10, 2007
- Mill Valley Film Festival Mill Valley, California West Coast Premiere October 7–15, 2006
- CineVegas Film Festival Las Vegas June 9–17, 2006
- Tribeca Film Festival New York World Premiere April 27 – May 5, 2006
