= In the Line of Duty: Ambush in Waco =

- Genre: Crime; Action; Drama; Thriller
- Written by: Phil Penningroth
- Directed by: Dick Lowry
- Starring: Tim Daly
- Theme music composer: Mark Snow
- Country of origin: United States
- Original language: English

Production
- Executive producer: Kenneth Kaufman
- Producers: Ann Kindberg; Dick Lowry; Wendell Rawls
- Production location: Tulsa, Oklahoma
- Cinematography: Frank Beascoechea
- Editors: Anita Brandt-Burgoyne; Jeff Cahn
- Running time: 98 minutes
- Production companies: Patchett Kaufman Entertainment; World International Network

Original release
- Network: NBC
- Release: May 23, 1993

In the Line of Duty: Ambush in Waco is a 1993 American made-for-television action drama film starring Tim Daly that aired on NBC on May 23, 1993.

== Synopsis ==
The film portrays the events leading up to and at the start of the Waco siege.

== Cast ==
- Tim Daly as David Koresh
- William O'Leary as Adrian
- Neal McDonough as Jason
- Lewis Smith as Robert Williams
- Marley Shelton as Laura
- Jeri Ryan as Rebecca
- Stephen Miller
- Debra Jo Rupp as Dorrie
- Clu Gulager as McLennan County Sheriff
- Gordon Clapp as Glenn
- Richard McGonagle
- Susanna Thompson as Meg
- Heather McAdam as Michelle
- Kris Kamm
- Dan Lauria as Bob Blanchard
- Adrienne Stiefel as Libby
- Julie Ariola as Carol
- Cara Buono
- Glenn Morshower as Conway LeBleu
- Anne Gee Byrd as Sue Llamas
- Miriam Byrd-Nethery as Harriet
- Dave Lowry as Bill
- Juan A. Riojas as Hector
- Michael de la Force featured uncredited ATF agent
- Alana Austin as Betsy
- Kent Broadhurst as Cole
- Carlease Burke as Lizabeth
- James Marsden as Steven Willis
- Robert Tekampe as Adventist Man
- David Cook
- Geoffrey Rivas as Luis
- Brent Anderson as Stan
- T.J. Kennedy as Editor
- Jeff Allin as Tribble
- Gwyn Little as Farmer
- Staci Wilson as Delivery Driver
- Brad Farnsworth as the TV Reporter
- Milt Tarver as Cameron
- Darryl Cox as Clerk
- Keith D. Allgeier as Gun Dealer
- C. Alan Rawlins as Drug Suspect
- Shawn Aaron Davis as Mailman
- Curtis Sprague as Sprague
- Greg Wilson as Reporter

== Production ==
Filming took place in the Tulsa, Oklahoma area.

== Reception ==
Todd Everett of Variety.com noted that, even though it was already being filmed during the actual series of events, the film is "an engrossing affair, with no signs of hasty production". John O'Connor of The New York Times also noted the rapid production of the film that aired "little more than a month after the Texas fire that claimed the lives of David Koresh and 71 other people" and determined that "the elapsed time between news story and television docudrama grows ever shorter as networks scramble to exploit a seemingly inexhaustible based-on-fact marketplace." Due to this fact, Howard Rosenberg of the Los Angeles Times points out that the film does not focus on the final storming of the compound on April 19 but rather "the initial storming of the Mt. Carmel compound 51 days earlier" and concludes that "Phil Penningroth's script provides a rationale not only for the initial assault but also for the more controversial one on April 19 that resulted in mass deaths".

== Penningroth's regret ==
Screenplay writer Phil Penningroth has regretted his involvement with this telefilm, calling it pro-ATF "propaganda" in the years since its premiere, expressing his feelings in an August 2001 article he wrote for the online magazine Killing the Buddha.
