= Diane Ayala Goldner =

American actress

- Born: January 9, 1956 (age 70)
- Occupation: Actress
- Years active: 1998–present
- Spouse: John Gulager (m. 1986)

Diane Ayala Goldner (born January 9, 1956) is an actress. She is best known for her roles in her husband, John Gulager's film series Feast.

== Filmography ==
- Honeymoon (1998) as Laura
- The Poet Writes His Wife (2002) as Caitlan Thomas
- Adam's Apocalypse (2003) as Boss
- Feast (2005) as Harley Mom
- Vic (2006) as Cashier
- Satanic (2006) as Jackie
- Feast II: Sloppy Seconds (2008) as Biker Queen
- Pulse 2: Afterlife (2008) as Mrs. Sorenstram
- Pulse 3 (2008) as Sarah Wilkie
- Feast III: The Happy Finish (2009) as Biker Queen
- The Collector (2009) as Gena Morton
- Halloween II (2009) as Jane Salvador
- Ashes (2010) as Homeless Woman
- This Never Happened (2011) as Priscilla
- The Key to Annabel Lee (2011) as The Partner
- The Night Plays Tricks (2011) as D.
- Stay at Home Dad (2012) as Dr. Kravitz
- Moments (2012) as Unknown Role
- Hatchet III (2013) as Elbert
- Whispers (2013) as Dr. Chandler
- Children of the Corn: Runaway (2018) as Mrs. Dawkins
- Bad Apples (2018) as Mrs. Dekker
