= Karley Scott Collins =

- Born: December 14, 1999 (age 26)
- Origin: Lake City, Florida
- Genre: Country
- Occupations: Actress, Singer-songwriter
- Instruments: Vocals, Guitar, Violin
- Years active: 2006-present
- Label: Sony Music Nashville

Karley Scott Collins (born December 14, 1999) is an actress and singer-songwriter from Lake City, Florida. She is currently signed to Sony Music Nashville.

== Early life and acting ==
Karley Scott Collins grew up in the small town of Lake City, Florida to parents Nena and Scott Collins. Her dad would play rock music on the way to school, while her Nana would play country music.

Collins started acting at the age of 6, eventually landing a role in a TV show called The Class. In 2008, Collins played the younger version of Paris Hilton in the film Hottie and the Nottie, in 2009 she appeared in the horror film The Collector and in 2010, she starred in the movie Amish Grace. Collins also played the role of Gretel in ABC's Once Upon a Time.

When Collins was 9 she needed to learn guitar for an acting audition. She fell in love with it and it led to her pursuing a music career.

== Music career ==
At the age of 14, Collins started keeping a notebook of phrases, stories, and lyrics with sights on a Country music career. She moved to Nashville and scored a publishing deal in 2019. During this period, she collaborated with artists like Liz Rose, Brock Berryhill, Nathan Chapman, and Brett James.

In 2023, Collins, who grew up 30 minutes from rocker Tom Petty's hometown of Gainesville, Florida, recorded the track "Petty in the 80s," a tribute to her love of classic rock.

On May 5, 2023, Collins released her Sony Music Nashville EP, Hands on the Wheel.

Collins' single Marlboro Reds was featured as one of Billboard magazine's 5 Must-Hear New Country Songs on February 5, 2024. Collins was also named on CMT's Next Women of Country Class of 2024.

On June 7, 2024, Collins released her second EP, Write One. Producer Nathan Chapman sent the track Write One to country star Keith Urban, who liked it and recorded it with Collins.

On June 26, 2024, Collins made her Grand Ole Opry debut.

Collins is touring as an opening act on Keith Urban's 2025 High and Alive World Tour along with Alana Springsteen and Chase Matthew. She has previously opened for Willie Nelson, and toured with Carly Pearce, Nate Smith, and Corey Kent. She released her debut album, Flight Risk, on September 26.

== Discography ==
=== Albums ===
- Flight Risk (Sony Music Nashville, 2025)

=== Extended Plays ===
- Hands on the Wheel (Sony Music Nashville, 2023)
- Write One (Sony Music Nashville, 2023)

=== Singles ===
- Heavenly (Sony Music Nashville, 2022)
- Tattoos (Sony Music Nashville, 2022)
- Better Strangers (Sony Music Nashville, 2022)
- Petty in the 80s (Sony Music Nashville, 2023)
- Brain on Love (Sony Music Nashville, 2023)
- Downtime (feat. Roman Alexander) (Sony Music Nashville, 2023)
- Heavy Metal (Sony Music Nashville, 2023)
- Marlboro Reds (Sony Music Nashville, 2024)
- How Do You Do That (feat. Charles Kelley) (Sony Music Nashville, 2024)
- Write One (Feat. Keith Urban) (Sony Music Nashville, 2024)
- Quit You (Sony Music Nashville, 2024)
- Religion and Politics (Sony Music Nashville, 2024)

== Filmography ==
- The Class (2006) - Oprah
- Private Practice(2007) - Erin
- The Hottie & the Nottie (2008) - Young Cristabel
- Pulse 2: Afterlife (2008) - Justine
- Amusement (2008) - Child Tabitha
- Pulse 3 (2008) - Young Justine
- The Collector (2009) - Hannah Chase
- Amish Grace (2010) - Katie Graber
- Letters to God (2010) - Ashley Turner
- Open Season 3 (2010) - Gisela
- Family Guy (2010-2012) - Nurse, Abby, Little Girl
- Fringe (2011) - Young Olivia Dunham
- Answers to Nothing (2011) - Tina
- When You Find Me (2011) - Aurora
- Once Upon a Time (2012) - Ava Zimmer, Gretel
