= Miriam Byrd-Nethery =

American actress (1929–2003)

- Born: May 17, 1929; Lewisville, Arkansas, U.S.
- Died: January 6, 2003 (aged 73); Los Angeles, California, U.S.
- Other names: Miriam Nethery; Miriam Byrd Nethery
- Occupation: Actress
- Spouse: Clu Gulager (m. 1952)
- Children: John Gulager; Tom Gulager

Miriam Byrd-Nethery (May 17, 1929 – January 6, 2003) was an American actress. Her film roles included Bound for Glory (1976) and Leatherface: The Texas Chainsaw Massacre III and Across Five Aprils (both 1990).

== Early life ==
Byrd-Nethery was one of five siblings born in Lewisville, Arkansas to Daniel Thompson "Tom" Nethery and Ruby Estelle Byrd.

== Personal life ==
She was married to Clu Gulager. Their sons are John and Tom Gulager.

== Death ==
Byrd-Nethery died in Los Angeles on January 6, 2003, at age 73 following a long battle with a brain tumor, which had also cost her sight in one eye.

== Filmography ==
- Mr. T and Tina (1976 TV) – Miss Llewellyn
- The Big Bus (1976) – Farmer's Wife
- Bound for Glory (1976) – Sick Woman – Water-Swallowing Scene (as Miriam Byrd Nethery)
- Victory at Entebbe (1976 TV) – Nun's Ward
- Nickelodeon (1976) – Aunt Lula
- Deadly Game (1977 TV) – Polly
- Just Me and You (1978 TV) – Connie
- Steel Cowboy (1978 TV) – Waitress
- Like Normal People (1979 TV) – Billie
- Angel Dusted (1981) (TV)
- Lies (1985) – Night Nurse (credited as Miriam Byrd Nethery)
- Walk Like a Man (1987) – Toy Store Cashier
- The Offspring (aka From a Whisper to a Scream; 1987) – Eileen Burnside
- Summer Heat (1987) – Aunt Patty
- Act II (1987 TV) – Dede McKenna
- Stepfather II (aka The Stepfather 2: Make Room for Daddy; 1989) – Sally Jenkins
- Leatherface: The Texas Chainsaw Massacre III (1990) – Mama Sawyer
- Dan Turner, Hollywood Detective (aka The Raven Red Kiss-Off; 1990 TV) – Motel Manager
- Across Five Aprils (aka Civil War Diary (USA: video title; 1990)) – Ellen Creighton
- In the Line of Duty: Ambush in Waco (1993 TV) – Harriet
- Vic (short film; 2006) – Mary Kay (final film role)

=== TV appearances ===
- Starsky & Hutch (episode: "Running"; February 25, 1976) – Old Woman
- Barney Miller (episode: "The Accusation"; October 12, 1978; credited as Miriam Byrd Nethery) – Doris Whittaker
- Alice (episode: "The Principal of the Thing"; December 10, 1978) – Henrietta
- The Dukes of Hazzard (episode: "Double Sting"; May 11, 1979) – Rose Ellen
- Barney Miller (episode: "The Bird"; November 8, 1979; credited as Miriam Byrd Nethery) – Myrna Dunbar
- Young Maverick (episode: "Makin' Tracks"; January 9, 1980)
- The Dukes of Hazzard (episode: "Southern Comfurts"; March 21, 1980; credited as Miriam Byrd Nethery) – Holly Comfurt
- Charlie's Angels playing "Flo Bartlett" (episode: "Moonshinin' Angels"; January 24, 1981) – Flo Bartlett
- Barney Miller (episode: "The Librarian"; February 19, 1981; credited as Miriam Byrd Nethery) – Louise Austin
- Barney Miller (episode: "Altercation"; April 9, 1982) – Beverly Wakefield
- Quincy (episode: "Unreasonable Doubt"; November 10, 1982) – Annie – the Maid
- Mr. Belvedere (episode: "Strike"; November 15, 1985) – Marie Tingle
- Highway to Heaven (episode: "Wally"; January 14, 1987) – Margaret
- Mr. Belvedere (episode: "Jobless"; January 23, 1987) – Edna Wilks
- Mr. Belvedere (episode: "Fear of Flying"; November 4, 1989) – Ethel
