= John Gulager =

American actor (born 1957)

- Born: John Thompson Gulager; December 19, 1957 (age 68); New York City, New York, U.S.
- Occupations: Actor; cinematographer; film director; musician
- Years active: 1969–present
- Spouse: Diane Ayala Goldner (m. 1986)
- Parents: Clu Gulager (father); Miriam Byrd-Nethery (mother)
- Relatives: Tom Gulager (brother)

John Thompson Gulager (born December 19, 1957) is an American actor, cinematographer and film director. He is the son of actors Clu Gulager and Miriam Byrd-Nethery, and the brother of actor Tom Gulager.

== Career ==
For Gulager's directorial debut, the production and filming of the movie Feast was the main focus of season three of Project Greenlight. The film, made for Miramax, had a limited theatrical release. Gulager was named Best Director at Fantastic Fest 2005 for Feast.

Gulager played Maurice Gregory, the company psychologist, and supplied the voice for Goldie, the fish, in the 2007 film He Was a Quiet Man opposite Christian Slater.

== Filmography ==
=== As actor ===
- A Day with the Boys (1969) – Boy
- Gunfighter – Rustler
  - a.k.a. Ballad of a Gunfighter (USA: TV title) (1998)
- Palmer's Pick Up (1999) – Santa Claus
- The Poet Writes His Wife (2002) – Dylan Thomas
- Feast (2005) - Man on television with two other crew members
- He Was a Quiet Man (2007) – Maurice Goldie (voice)
- Pulse 2: Afterlife (2008) – Man on Bridge
- Hellraiser: Judgment (2018) - The Assessor

=== As cinematographer ===
- The Poet Writes His Wife (2002)
- Vic (2005)
- Pornstar Pets (2005) (Video)
- La Lucha: The Struggle (2005) (Video)

=== As director ===
- Feast (2005)
- Feast II: Sloppy Seconds (2008)
- Feast III: The Happy Finish (2009)
- Piranha 3DD (2012)
- Zombie Night (2013)
- Children of the Corn: Runaway (2018)
- Seven Cemeteries (2024)

=== Other TV appearances ===
- Project Greenlight 3 (2005) (TV Series) Himself
