= Feast (2005 film) =

2005 American horror comedy film

- Theatrical release poster
- Directed by: John Gulager
- Written by: Patrick Melton; Marcus Dunstan
- Produced by: Michael Leahy; Joel Soisson; Larry Tanz; Andrew Jameson
- Starring: Balthazar Getty; Navi Rawat; Henry Rollins; Judah Friedlander; Josh Zuckerman; Jenny Wade; Duane Whitaker; Jason Mewes; Eileen Ryan; Eric Dane; Krista Allen; Clu Gulager
- Cinematography: Thomas L. Callaway
- Edited by: Kirk M. Morri
- Music by: Stephen Edwards
- Production companies: LivePlanet; Maloof Motion Pictures; Neo Art & Logic
- Distributed by: Dimension Films
- Release dates: October 14, 2005 (CIFF); September 22, 2006 (Limited)
- Running time: 87 minutes
- Country: United States
- Language: English
- Budget: $3.2 million
- Box office: $658,573

Feast is a 2005 American action horror comedy film directed by John Gulager, produced by Michael Leahy, Joel Soisson, Larry Tanz and Andrew Jameson. It was written by Patrick Melton and Marcus Dunstan and stars Balthazar Getty, Henry Rollins, Navi Rawat, Judah Friedlander, Jenny Wade, Gulager's father Clu Gulager, Josh Zuckerman and Jason Mewes. The story revolves around a group of people gathered inside a local bar in Nevada, where they are suddenly attacked by a horde of monstrous creatures.

Feast is a result of the amateur filmmaking documentary series and contest Project Greenlight's third season. The winning team was composed of writers Dunstan and Melton and director Gulager. The executive producers were Ben Affleck, Matt Damon, Chris Moore (through their LivePlanet production company), Wes Craven and the Maloof family.

The film had a limited release in the United States on September 22, 2006, and premiered at the Chicago International Film Festival on October 14, 2005. Upon its release, it received generally mixed reviews from critics and grossed $658,000 against a production budget of $3 million.

== Plot ==
As people are enjoying drinks in a Nevada bar, a man covered in blood—identified onscreen as "Hero"—enters through the door and warns them all of impending danger. No one heeds his warning, so he shows the bar patrons the head of a repulsive creature to make them take him seriously. He is soon pulled through a window and decapitated by one of the monsters. After the carnage, a woman—"Heroine"—bursts through the door and reveals herself to be the recently deceased man's wife. After a brief sentimental moment between the wife and her late husband, the bar patrons begin boarding up the windows in the bar. Despite their efforts, a young monster bursts through an uncovered window and begins attacking. As a monster outside bursts its hand through "Vet", "Edgy Cat" has his face torn off and is accidentally shot dead, and the little monster cuts off the leg of one of the women — "Harley Mom" — who is initially assumed to have died from massive blood loss.

A monster begins to hump one of the deer heads nailed to the wall. A shotgun blast drops the monster into a freezer, which is then sealed shut, trapping it inside. Afterward, the remaining windows are boarded up, and the bar patrons get a moment of peace. Trying to call for help, they learn that the only phone in the bar has been hit by a stray shotgun blast and rendered useless. One of the women—"Tuffy"—suddenly realizes that her son Cody is still upstairs and runs to get him. Once she finds her child, the group rejoices until the boy is pulled through a window and eaten by one of the monsters, leaving only his right foot behind. Tuffy is incapacitated by grief, while the monster vomits a stream of slime at one of the group—"Beer Guy". As the remaining people regroup downstairs, they realize that the slime has a decomposing effect on Beer Guy.

The group realizes that they have no outside communication and are stuck at the bar. They barricade themselves inside.

The group kills the young monster in the freezer and hangs it outside. The monster's parents quickly eat the child, have sex, and produce two offspring in a matter of seconds, all of whom begin to attack the pub with renewed fury. Meanwhile, one of the women—"Honey Pie"—begins washing off the blood and has to take off her clothes, much to the amusement of the others. The patrons regroup and enact various attempts to escape or drive off the monsters, including using Harley Mom's body as boobytrap while the Heroine and the "Coach" attempt to escape. Upon discovering she is still alive, "Bossman" continues to prepare to sacrifice her to the creatures when she is suddenly grabbed by a baby monster that starts sexually assaulting her. The distraction fails, leading to the accidental death of the Heroine at the hands of another character, "Bozo". Driven by rage over the death of her child, Tuffy aggressively takes charge of the remaining survivors, which results in the audience seeing her nickname change from "Tuffy" to "Heroine 2". After "Coach" and "Bossman" are killed, "Honey Pie" makes it to a truck, giving the other characters brief hope (until they realize she is speeding off by herself).

A fight to the death between the last remaining humans and monsters ensues, resulting in the deaths of "Beer Guy" and supposedly the "Bartender". Bozo, his brother Hot Wheels, and Heroine 2 survive and drive off to retrieve the Heroine and Hero's daughter. One person—"Grandma"—is shown to still be alive within the bar but is attacked by one of the remaining monsters.

== Cast ==
- Krista Allen as Tuffy/Heroine 2
- Clu Gulager as Bartender
- Balthazar Getty as Bozo
- Navi Rawat as Heroine
- Henry Rollins as Coach
- Judah Friedlander as Beer Guy
- Josh Zuckerman as Hot Wheels
- Jenny Wade as Honey Pie
- Duane Whitaker as Bossman
- Jason Mewes as Edgy Cat/himself
- Eileen Ryan as Grandma
- Eric Dane as Hero
- Diane Ayala Goldner as Harley Mom
- Anthony "Treach" Criss as Vet
- Tyler Patrick Jones as Cody

== Reception ==
On Rotten Tomatoes, Feast holds an approval rating of 57% based on 54 reviews, with a weighted average rating of 5.8/10. The site's critical consensus reads: "Director Gulager makes the most of what he's given; the resulting Feast offers up some surprisingly tasty -- if far from nourishing -- morsels".

On Metacritic, which assigns a normalized rating to reviews, the film has a weighted average score of 43 out of 100, based on 16 critics, indicating "mixed or average" reviews.
