= Wes Craven filmography =

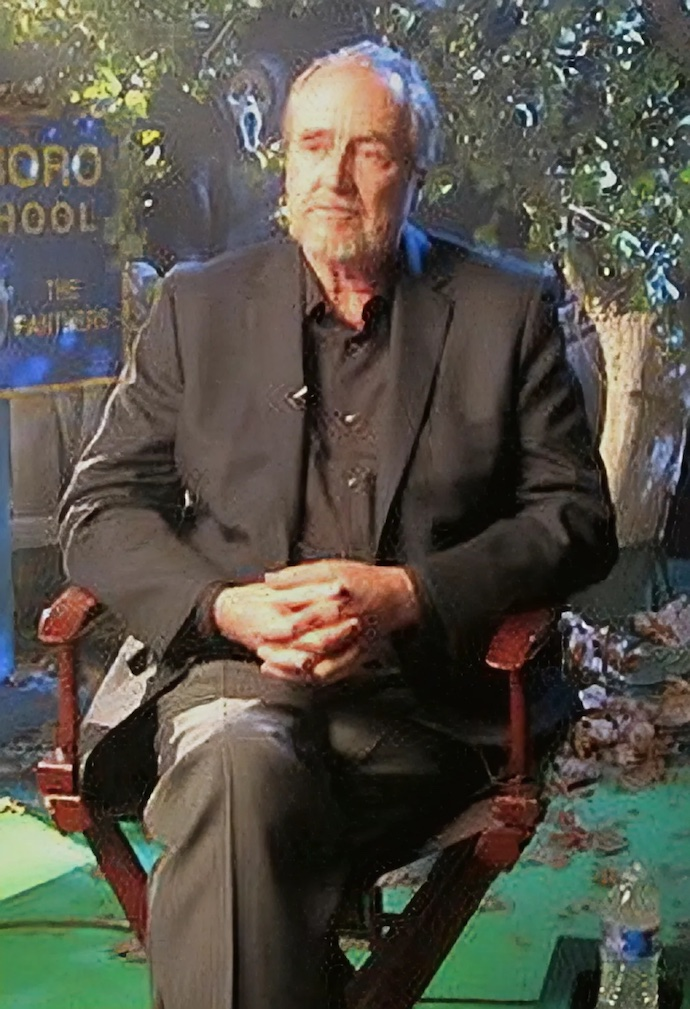
Craven in 2010

Wes Craven (1939–2015) was an American film director, screenwriter, producer, editor, and actor. He contributed to many projects as either the director, writer, producer, editor, actor, or a combination of the five.

== Film ==
Year	Title	Director	Writer	Producer	Notes
1972	The Last House on the Left	Yes	Yes	No	Also editor
1975	The Fireworks Woman	Yes	Yes	No	Also editor
1977	The Hills Have Eyes	Yes	Yes	No	Also editor
1981	Deadly Blessing	Yes	Yes	No	
1982	Swamp Thing	Yes	Yes	No	
1984	A Nightmare on Elm Street	Yes	Yes	No	
1985	The Hills Have Eyes Part II	Yes	Yes	No	
1986	Deadly Friend	Yes	No	No	
1987	A Nightmare on Elm Street 3: Dream Warriors	No	Yes	Executive	
1988	The Serpent and the Rainbow	Yes	No	No	
1989	Shocker	Yes	Yes	Executive	
1991	The People Under the Stairs	Yes	Yes	Executive	
1994	Wes Craven's New Nightmare	Yes	Yes	Executive	
1995	Vampire in Brooklyn	Yes	No	No	
1996	Scream	Yes	No	No	
1997	Scream 2	Yes	No	Yes	
1999	Music of the Heart	Yes	No	No	
2000	Scream 3	Yes	No	No	
2005	Cursed	Yes	No	No	
2005	Red Eye	Yes	No	No	
2006	Paris, je t'aime	Yes	Yes	No	Segment: "Père-Lachaise"
2006	Pulse	No	Yes	No	
2007	The Hills Have Eyes 2	No	Yes	Yes	
2010	My Soul to Take	Yes	Yes	Yes	
2011	Scream 4	Yes	No	Yes	

Producer only

- Together (1971) (Associate producer)
- The Hills Have Eyes (2006)
- The Last House on the Left (2009)

Executive producer only

- Wishmaster (1997)
- Carnival of Souls (1998)
- Dracula 2000 (2000)
- Feast (2005)
- The Breed (2006)
- The Girl in the Photographs (2015)

=== Acting roles ===
Year	Title	Role	Notes
1973	It Happened in Hollywood	King's Litter Bearer	
1975	The Fireworks Woman	Nicholas Burns	Credited as Abe Snake
1976	Sweet Cakes	Photographer	Uncredited
1989	Shocker	Man Neighbor	
1994	Wes Craven's New Nightmare	Himself	
1995	The Fear	Dr. Arnold	
1996	Scream	Fred the Janitor	Uncredited
1997	Scream 2	Doctor	Uncredited
1998	Welcome to Hollywood	Himself	
2000	Scream 3	Man with Video Camera on Studio Tour	Uncredited
2001	Jay and Silent Bob Strike Back	Himself	
2005	Red Eye	Airline passenger	Uncredited
2007	Diary of the Dead	Newsreader	Uncredited
2011	Scream 4	Coroner	Deleted scene
2011	Scream: The Inside Story	Himself	Documentary film
2011	Still Screaming: The Ultimate Scary Movie Retrospective	Himself	Documentary film
2013	Crystal Lake Memories: The Complete History of Friday the 13th	Himself	Documentary film

=== Other credits ===
Year	Title	Role
1973	It Happened in Hollywood	Editor and assistant director
1973	Kitty Can't Help It	Editor
1978	Here Come the Tigers	Gaffer
1978	The Evolution of Snuff	Cinematographer
2002	They	Presenter
2003	Dracula II: Ascension	Presenter
2005	Dracula III: Legacy	Presenter

== Television ==
TV movies

Year	Title	Director	Writer	Executive Producer
1978	Stranger in Our House	Yes	No	No
1984	Invitation to Hell	Yes	No	No
1985	Wes Craven's Chiller	Yes	No	No
1990	Night Visions	Yes	Yes	Yes

Producer only

- Kent State (1981)
- Mind Ripper (1995)

Executive producer only

- Laurel Canyon (1993)
- Don't Look Down (1998)
- Hollyweird (1998)
- They Shoot Divas, Don't They? (2002)

TV series

Year	Title	Director	Writer	Executive Producer	Creator	Notes
1985–86	The Twilight Zone	Yes	No	No	No	5 episodes
1986	Disneyland	Yes	No	No	No	Episode "Casebusters"
1988–90	Freddy's Nightmares	No	Yes	No	Yes	44 episodes
1989	The People Next Door	No	Yes	Yes	Yes	10 episodes
1992	Nightmare Cafe	Yes	No	Yes	Yes	6 episodes

Executive producer only

- Scream (2015–19)

=== Acting roles ===
Year	Title	Role	Notes
1985	The Twilight Zone	Caged Man #1	Episode "Children's Zoo"
1992	Roseanne	Himself	Episode: "Halloween IV"
1993	Body Bags	Pasty Faced Man	Segment "The Gas Station"
1996	Shadow Zone: The Undead Express	Counsellor	TV movie
2000	Stark Raving Mad	Terrance Sterling	Episode "The Pigeon"
2006	Boston Legal	Himself	Episode: "Spring Fever"
2013	Castle	Himself	Episode "Scared to Death"

== See also ==
- Wes Craven's unrealized projects
