= The Hills Have Eyes (disambiguation) =

The Hills Have Eyes is an American horror franchise that consists of four slasher films, a graphic novel and merchandise. It may also refer to:

== In film ==
- Films from the franchise:
  - The Hills Have Eyes (1977 film), an American horror film written, directed, and edited by Wes Craven
  - The Hills Have Eyes Part II, a 1984 American horror film written and directed by Wes Craven
  - The Hills Have Eyes (2006 film), an American horror film and remake of Wes Craven's 1977 film of the same name
  - The Hills Have Eyes 2, a 2007 American horror film, and the sequel to the 2006 film which was a remake of the 1977 horror film
- Mind Ripper (also The Hills Have Eyes III), a horror film released on HBO in 1995

== In music ==
- "The Hills Have Eyes", the sixth track from Stratovarius' 1992 album Twilight Time
- "The Hills Have Eyes", the sixth track from Electric Wizard's 2000 album Dopethrone
- "The Hills Have Eyes", the second track from The Acacia Strain's 2010 album Wormwood
- "The Hills Have Eyes", a bonus track from Cypecore's 2016 album Identity
