= The Hills Have Eyes =

American horror franchise

In 2016, Arrow Video released a restored edition DVD and Blu-ray.

The Hills Have Eyes is an American horror franchise that consists of four horror films, as well as a graphic novel and merchandise. The first film was released in 1977, The Hills Have Eyes; the series was rebooted in a 2006 remake. The films focus on a group of people stranded in a desert who become hunted by a clan of deformed cannibals in the surrounding hills. The films collectively grossed over $132 million at the box-office worldwide. The series was created by Wes Craven who is known for the Nightmare on Elm Street and Scream films. The series has featured actors and actresses including Dee Wallace, Aaron Stanford, Michael Berryman and Emilie de Ravin.

== Films ==
Film	U.S. release date	Director(s)	Screenwriter(s)	Producer(s)
Original films
The Hills Have Eyes	June 22, 1977	Wes Craven	Wes Craven	Peter Locke
The Hills Have Eyes Part II	August 2, 1985	Wes Craven	Wes Craven	Peter Locke, Barry Cahn, Jonathan Debin
Reboot films
The Hills Have Eyes	March 10, 2006	Alexandre Aja	Alexandre Aja and Grégory Levasseur	Wes Craven, Marianne Maddalena, Peter Locke
The Hills Have Eyes 2	March 23, 2007	Martin Weisz	Wes Craven and Jonathan Craven	Wes Craven, Marianne Maddalena, Peter Locke

=== Cast ===
List indicators

This section includes characters who will appear or have appeared in more than two films in the series.

- An empty grey cell indicates the character was not in the film, or that the character's official presence has not yet been confirmed.
- ^{A} indicates an appearance through archival footage or audio.
- ^{C} indicates a cameo role.
- ^{U} indicates an uncredited appearance.

Character	Films			
Character	Original series		Reboot series	
Character	The Hills Have Eyes	The Hills Have Eyes Part II	The Hills Have Eyes	The Hills Have Eyes 2
Character	1977	1985	2006	2007
Humans
Doug Wood / Bukowski	Martin Speer	Mentioned	Aaron Stanford	Mentioned
Brenda Carter	Susan Lanier	Susan Lanier^{A}	Emilie de Ravin	Mentioned
Bobby Carter	Robert Houston	Robert Houston	Dan Byrd	Mentioned
Lynne Carter-Wood / Bukowski	Dee Wallace	Mentioned	Vinessa Shaw	Mentioned
Ethel Carter	Virginia Vincent	Virginia Vincent^{A}	Kathleen Quinlan	Mentioned
Big Bob Carter	Russ Grieve	Mentioned	Ted Levine	Mentioned
Catherine "Katy" Wood / Bukowski	Brenda Marinoff	Mentioned	Maisie Camilleri	Mentioned
Ruby / Rachel	Janus Blythe	Janus Blythe	Laura Ortiz	
Fred	John Steadman		Tom Bower	
Beast	Appeared	Appeared	Appeared	Mentioned
Beauty	Appeared		Appeared	Mentioned
The Cannibal
Pluto	Michael Berryman	Michael Berryman	Michael Bailey Smith	
Papa Jupiter	James Whitworth	James Whitworth^{A}	Billy Drago	
Mercury	Peter Locke		Adam Perrell	
Big Mama	Cordy Clark		Ivana Turchetto	

== Reception ==
=== Box office ===
Film	Release date (US)	Budget	Box office revenue			Reference
Film	Release date (US)	Budget	United States	Foreign	Worldwide	Reference
The Hills Have Eyes (1977)	July 22, 1977	$230,000	$25,000,000	—N/a	$25,000,000	
The Hills Have Eyes Part II	January 2, 1985	$700,000	—N/a	—N/a	—N/a	
The Hills Have Eyes (2006)	March 10, 2006	$15,000,000	$41,778,863	$27,844,850	$69,623,713	
The Hills Have Eyes 2	March 23, 2007	$15,000,000	$20,804,166	$16,662,372	$37,405,247	
Total		$38,930,000	$66,584,110	$44,507,222	$132,028,960	

=== Critical reception ===
Most of the films have received mixed reception from critics.

Film	Rotten Tomatoes	Metacritic
The Hills Have Eyes (1977)	69% (29 reviews)	
The Hills Have Eyes Part II	12% (8 reviews)	
The Hills Have Eyes (2006)	51% (137 reviews)	52% (28 reviews)
The Hills Have Eyes 2	13% (64 reviews)	32% (18 reviews)

== Comics ==
Cover art

To coincide with the release of The Hills Have Eyes 2, Fox Atomic Comics released a graphic novel set in the continuity of the remake series in July 2007. The Hills Have Eyes: The Beginning reveals the genesis of the mutants, who were once normal people, ignorant to the rest of the world, and how they evolved into horrific creatures. It was written by Jimmy Palmiotti and Justin Gray, and drawn by John Higgins.
