= List of awards and nominations received by Wes Craven =

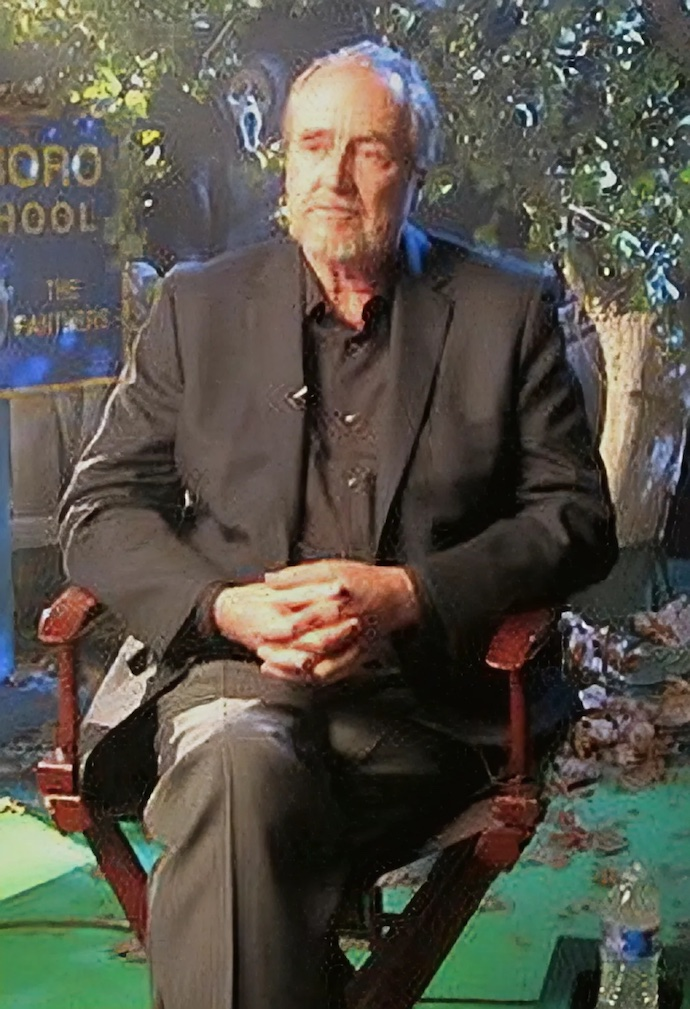
Craven in 2010

The following is a list of awards and nominations by American film director, screenwriter, producer, and editor Wes Craven. He is best known for his work in the horror film genre, particularly slasher films. Throughout his career, Craven was nominated for and won numerous awards, including multiple Saturn Awards and film festival honors.

In 1977, Craven won the critics award at the Sitges Film Festival for his horror film The Hills Have Eyes. In 1997, the Gérardmer Film Festival granted him the Grand Prize for the slasher film Scream. In 2012, the New York City Horror Film Festival awarded Craven the Lifetime Achievement Award.

== Awards and nominations ==
Year	Association	Category	Work	Result	Ref.
1977	Sitges Film Festival	Critics Award	The Hills Have Eyes	Won	
1985	Avoriaz Fantastic Film Festival	Critics Award	A Nightmare on Elm Street	Won	
1990	International Fantasy Film Award	Best Film	Shocker	Nominated	
1992	Avoriaz Fantastic Film Festival	Special Jury Award	The People Under the Stairs	Won	
1992	Brussels International Fantastic Film Festival	Pegasus Audience Award	The People Under the Stairs	Won	
1992	Fangoria Chainsaw Awards	Best Screenplay	The People Under the Stairs	Nominated	
1992	Fangoria Chainsaw Awards	Best Studio/Big-Budget Film	The People Under the Stairs	Nominated	
1995	International Fantasy Film Award	Best Film	Wes Craven's New Nightmare	Nominated	
1995	International Fantasy Film Award	Best Screenplay	Wes Craven's New Nightmare	Won	
1995	Fangoria Chainsaw Awards	Best Screenplay	Wes Craven's New Nightmare	Won	
1995	Fangoria Chainsaw Awards	Best Studio/Big-Budget Film	Wes Craven's New Nightmare	Nominated	
1997	Cahiers du Cinéma	Top Ten Film	Scream	Won	
1997	Gérardmer Film Festival	Grand Prize	Scream	Won	
1997	Saturn Award	Best Director	Scream	Nominated	
2005	Rondo Hatton Classic Horror Awards	Best Film	Cursed	Nominated	

=== Special awards ===
Year	Association	Category	Result	Ref.
1995	Academy of Science Fiction, Fantasy & Horror Films	Life Career Award	Won	
2000	Amsterdam Fantastic Film Festival	Lifetime Achievement Award	Won	
2000	Cinequest Film Festival	Maverick Tribute Award	Won	
2008	Scream Awards	Mastermind Award	Won	
2012	New York City Horror Film Festival	Life Achievement Award	Won	

== See also ==
- Wes Craven
