= Wes Craven's unrealized projects =

During his long career, American film director Wes Craven (1939-2015) has worked on several projects which never progressed beyond the pre-production stage under his direction. Some of these projects fell in development hell, were officially canceled, were in development limbo or would see life under a different production team.

== 1980s ==
=== Flowers in the Attic ===
In the mid-1980s, Craven wanted to direct and had already written a screenplay for the film adaptation of Flowers in the Attic, but his screenplay was rejected and Jeffrey Bloom was hired as the director and screenwriter.

=== Beetlejuice ===
In the 1980s, Craven was at one point attached to direct Beetlejuice, but Tim Burton was hired as the director.

=== Shocker sequel ===
Craven wanted to direct and write a sequel to Shocker, but the box office performance of the first movie hampered Craven's plan.

== 1990s ==
=== The Beast (1996) ===
In the early-1990s, Craven wanted to direct the film adaptation of Peter Benchley’s novel Beast, which became the TV movie The Beast.

=== Doctor Strange ===
On December 8, 1992, Craven was attached to direct a film based on the Marvel Comics’ character Doctor Strange for Savoy Pictures, but according to Joseph Maddrey's book "The Soul of Wes Craven", the project became a television series instead.

=== The Haunting (1999) ===
In 1995, Craven attempted to remake The Haunting, but ended up taking over Scream because of long, drawn out negotiations with Dimension Films over the remake, which led to Jan de Bont remaking the film in 1999.

=== Bad Moon Rising ===
In 1997, Craven was attached to direct Bad Moon Rising, a werewolf biker film for Dimension Films about a series of murders in a small West Virginia town, but the film was never made because of Craven & Scott Rosenberg’s creative differences, which led to Craven directing Scream 2.

=== Hollyweird TV pilot/series ===
On January 20, 1998, Craven and Shaun Cassidy were attached to executive produce the horror TV series Hollyweird through Universal Television for Fox for the 1998–1999 season, but it did not materialize.

=== The Fountain Society film ===
On April 15, 1999, Craven was attached to direct and produce the film adaptation of his novel The Fountain Society for ImageMovers and DreamWorks Pictures, but it didn't materialize.

=== Drowning Ruth film ===
On June 18, 1999, Craven was attached to direct and produce the film adaptation of Christina Schwartz's novel Drowning Ruth for Miramax.

== 2000s ==
=== Trans-Sister Radio film ===
On August 8, 2000, Craven was attached to produce the film adaptation of Chris Bohjalian’s novel Trans-Sister Radio for Miramax, but it did not materialize.

=== MTV artificial intelligence pilot ===
On October 23, 2000, Craven was attached to produce and direct Karl Schaefer's pilot focused on artificial intelligence for UPN.

=== The Day I Went Missing film ===
On November 1, 2000, Craven confirmed that he would produce the film adaptation of Jennifer Miller's true story novel The Day I Went Missing with Donald Martin writing the script about a woman who gets seduced by an unconventional psychotherapist for Miramax.

=== The Waiting ===
On June 27, 2002, Craven was attached to produce and direct Juliet Snowden and Stiles White's suspense thriller spec script The Waiting, which is about a mother haunted by her dead child, but on November 2, 2005, Alexandre Aja was attached to direct the movie instead of Craven.

=== Kamelot TV series ===
On January 30, 2003, Craven was attached as an executive producer on Kamelot, a sci-fi retelling of the King Arthur legend with Ron Milbauer and Terri Hughes writing and producing for UPN.

=== Untitled paranormal cop TV series ===
On May 6, 2003, Craven was attached to produce a TV series about an actual cop who investigates paranormal cases through Dimension Television, but it was not picked up by a TV network.

=== Whole New You ===
On May 13, 2004, Craven was confirmed to produce Jeremy Drysdale's script Whole New You, but it did not materialize.

=== Wild Card ===
On October 18, 2004, Craven was confirmed to write the full screenplay of Marshall Moseley's con-artist couple spec script Wild Card for Dimension Films with the possibility of Craven directing, but it did not materialize.

=== Shocker remake ===
On August 16, 2006, Craven confirmed that he would produce a feature film remake of Shocker with Rogue Pictures.

=== The People Under the Stairs remake ===
On April 21, 2007, Craven confirmed that he would produce a feature film remake of The People Under the Stairs with Rogue Pictures. But on October 30, 2020, Jordan Peele was confirmed to produce a feature film remake.

== 2010s ==
=== Sunflower ===
On February 19, 2010, Craven was in talks to direct Misha Green’s script Sunflower about two women who were abducted in a college professor’s prison-like farmhouse. But on August 3, 2012, Adam Blaiklock took over directing the movie from Craven, with Ben Stiller’s Red Hour Productions producing the film and 20th Century Fox set to distribute, however, the film fell into development hell and its fate is unknown after Disney's acquisition of 21st Century Fox was completed, and Green would eventually make the film her feature film directorial debut.

=== Coming of Rage film/TV series ===
On July 31, 2012, Craven and Steve Niles were set to develop a film adaptation of their Liquid Comics’ collaboration Coming of Rage with Arnold Rifken and Sharad Devarajan producing the film. On October 29, 2014, the comic book was reportedly getting a TV adaptation instead.

=== The People Under the Stairs TV series ===
On April 20, 2015, Craven would produce the television adaptation of his movie The People Under the Stairs through Universal Cable Productions for Syfy, with Michael Reisz writing the series that was described as a contemporary Downton Abbey meets The Amityville Horror. On August 30, 2015, Universal Cable Productions intended to make the series after Craven died earlier that day, but the series did not materialize.

=== We Are All Completely Fine TV series ===
On April 20, 2015, Craven would produce the television adaptation of Daryl Gregory’s novel We Are All Completely Fine through Universal Cable Productions for Syfy, with the possibility to direct the pilot episode. On August 30, 2015, Universal Cable Productions intended to make the series after Craven died earlier that day, but the series did not materialize.

=== Disciples TV series ===
On April 20, 2015, Craven would produce the television adaptation of Steve Nile's comic book Disciples through Universal Cable Productions for Syfy. On August 30, 2015, Universal Cable Productions intended to make the series after Craven died earlier that day, but the series did not materialize.

== Offers ==
=== Batman ===
During the production of Swamp Thing, Craven was among the directors that Benjamin Melniker and Michael E. Uslan considered while looking for a director.

=== The Mummy (1999) ===
In the 1990s, Craven was offered to remake of The Mummy, but turned it down and Stephen Sommers remade the film in 1999.

== See also ==
- Wes Craven filmography
