= The Hills Have Eyes 2 =

2007 film by Martin Weisz

- Theatrical release poster
- Directed by: Martin Weisz
- Written by: Wes Craven; Jonathan Craven
- Based on: Characters created by Wes Craven
- Produced by: Wes Craven; Marianne Maddalena; Peter Locke
- Starring: Michael McMillian; Jacob Vargas; Flex Alexander; Jessica Stroup
- Cinematography: Sam McCurdy
- Edited by: Kirk M. Morri; Sue Blainey
- Music by: Trevor Morris
- Production companies: Fox Atomic; Dune Entertainment; Craven/Maddalena Films; Midnite Entertainment
- Distributed by: 20th Century Fox
- Release date: March 23, 2007
- Running time: 90 minutes
- Country: United States
- Language: English
- Budget: $15 million
- Box office: $37.6 million

The Hills Have Eyes 2 is a 2007 American horror film and the sequel to the 2006 film, which itself was a remake of the 1977 horror film. The film follows several New Mexico Army National Guard comrades as they fight for survival against the mutant people living in a military base in the New Mexico desert. It stars Michael McMillian, Jacob Vargas, Flex Alexander and Jessica Stroup. The Hills Have Eyes 2 was directed by German film director Martin Weisz, and written by father and son team Wes and Jonathan Craven. A graphic novel titled The Hills Have Eyes: The Beginning was published by Fox Atomic Comics to accompany the release of the film; it was released on July 3, 2007.

== Plot ==
A captive woman, forced to breed mutant children, is unable to provide a healthy offspring after giving birth to a stillborn and is killed by Papa Hades, leader of the inbred mutant clan living at a nuclear testing village in the New Mexico desert, designated as Sector 16. Following the events of the first film, the United States Department of Defense sent in the military to occupy the location and exterminate the remainder of the mutant clan. While installing a surveillance system, Colonel Lincoln Redding and a trio of scientists are attacked by the mutants.

Later, a group of National Guardsmen in training led by Sergeant Jeffrey "Sarge" Millstone are sent into the desert to resupply the scientists. They arrive to find the base camp abandoned after the mutants' attack. When the soldiers pick up a faint distress call, Sarge organizes a search and rescue mission through the hills. Napoleon and Amber, who stay behind at the camp, find and retrieve one of the missing scientists out of the camp's portable toilet, but he dies before he can warn them. The two are then attacked by the mutants, who destroy their transport and steal their weapons, forcing them to run into the hills to warn the others. The search party is attacked by the mutants; Mickey is pulled into a bolt-hole and killed by Stabber, and Sarge is accidentally shot dead by Spitter's friendly fire just before Napoleon and Amber reunite with the group. Spitter is killed after one of the mutants sabotages his rappelling gear as the others try to lower him down the hill. With their remaining gear stolen, they are forced to try to find another way to escape.

The remaining troops soon locate Redding, mortally wounded and unhinged from the mutant's attack. He warns them of the mutants' plans to capture women for breeding and reveals an exit route through the mining caves before committing suicide. After the group kills Stabber, Missy is captured and taken into the mining caves by Chameleon, forcing the other troops to rescue her. Stump leaves the group to escape on his own before being pursued and killed by Letch while attempting to climb down the hill. Separating from Crank and Delmar, Napoleon and Amber cross paths with Chameleon, whom they manage to kill. While escaping Grabber, they are rescued by a nonviolent mutant named Hansel; Grabber encounters Crank and Delmar, shoots the latter with one of the group's M4 carbines and is killed by Crank in retaliation. While Hansel leads them to the exit, Delmar dies from his wounds after arriving at the mine's doorway. Napoleon joins Amber to save Missy. Crank, who is attempting to unlock the blast door, dies after accidentally triggering an explosion of a crate of dynamite that he attempts to take with him.

After killing Letch, Napoleon and Amber locate Missy who is being savagely raped by Papa Hades. After distracting him, they manage to free her, but Hades soon returns and attacks them, triggering a vicious fight until the trio finally subdues and kills the mutant leader with a bayonet. As the survivors prepare to depart the mines, they are watched by an unknown mutant using their surveillance equipment.

== Cast ==
- Michael McMillian as Private First Class David "Napoleon" Napoli
- Jessica Stroup as Private First Class Amber "Barbie" Johnson
- Daniella Alonso as Private First Class Marisol "Missy" Martinez
- Jacob Vargas as Private First Class Carlos "Crank" Medina
- Flex Alexander as Sergeant Jeff "Sarge" Millstone
- Lee Thompson Young as Private First Class Delmar "Del" Reed
- Eric Edelstein as Corporal Gilbert "Spitter" Cole
- Reshad Strik as Private First Class Michael "Mickey" Elrod
- Ben Crowley as Private First Class Scott "Stump" Locke
- Michael Bailey Smith as Papa Hades
- Derek Mears as Chameleon
- David Reynolds as Hansel
- Jeff Kober as Colonel Lincoln Redding
- Jay Acovone as Dr. Wilson
- Philip Pavel as Dr. Paul Foster
- Archie Kao as Dr. Han
- Jason Oettle as Letch
- Gáspár Szabó as Grabber
- Tyrell Kemlo as Stabber
- Cécile Breccia as Pregnant Woman
- Fatiha Quatili as Afghan Woman
- Joseph Beddelem as Insurgent
- Jeremy Goei as Clyde Martinez

== Production ==
Writer Wes Craven's initial inspiration for the film came during a casual conversation with producer Peter Locke. Craven envisioned that the previous film's character, Brenda (Emilie de Ravin), traumatized by her suffering during the events of The Hills Have Eyes, joins the National Guard to overcome her fears. Barely finished with basic training, Brenda receives a call from her sergeant, who explains that they are sending a team back to the New Mexico desert to eradicate the remaining mutants. Her sergeant and the team need her, for she is the only one left alive who knows the mutants' location. Because of de Ravin's involvement in the television show Lost, her schedule was unable to accommodate the filming of the sequel. Wes Craven replaced her character, but retained much of the original concept, including the group of National Guard soldiers in training.

Craven originally looked at M. J. Bassett, the director of Deathwatch, to take over the directing role, but ultimately chose Martin Weisz after scheduling conflicts with Bassett. The Hills Have Eyes 2 had a budget of $15 million, and began filming in the summer of 2006 in Ouarzazate, Morocco, where the previous movie was filmed.

== Release ==
=== Marketing ===
A one-minute teaser trailer was released on December 12, 2006. The teaser featured "Insect Eyes", a song by indie folk recording artist Devendra Banhart. In addition, the Fox Atomic website released a series of clips with an introduction by Wes Craven.

A graphic novel titled The Hills Have Eyes: The Beginning was published by Fox Atomic Comics to accompany the release of the film; it was released July 3, 2007.

=== Theatrical ===
The Hills Have Eyes 2 was released in theatres on March 23, 2007.

=== Home media ===
The film was released on DVD on July 17, 2007, by 20th Century Fox Home Entertainment. It also grossed over $30 million in domestic DVD sales, for a total of $67,915,885.

== Reception ==
=== Box office ===
The total gross at the box office of The Hills Have Eyes 2 was $37.6 million, about half of the original's total gross.

=== Critical response ===
Review aggregator Rotten Tomatoes gives the film a score of 13% based on reviews from 64 critics and a rating average of 3.2 out of 10. The site's critical consensus reads, "The Hills Have Eyes 2 is a completely unoriginal sequel that offers plenty of gore and clichés, but few scares." TV Guide gives the film one out of five stars. Film critic Peter Bradshaw of The Guardian wrote in his review which was printed in the Taipei Times: "The sequel of the remake of Wes Craven's The Hills Have Eyes has mutated into a boring mess of a movie." Review aggregator Metacritic, which assigns a weighted average score out of 100 to reviews from mainstream critics, the film received an average score of 32% based on 10 reviews.

Critic Matt Zoller Seitz of The New York Times wrote in his review: "Wes Craven's 1977 film, The Hills Have Eyes, in which suburbanites battled mutant cannibals, was a pulpy parable of the thin line separating civilization from savagery. The 2006 remake The Hills Have Eyes was basically the same movie with glossier production values and a less satirical, more bludgeoning approach to violence. This follow-up — in which National Guard trainees are trapped on a former atomic test site and are stalked by flesh-eating freaks headquartered in a warrenlike mountain hideout — is essentially a catalog of transgressive images, lighted and edited like a heavy-metal video."

Scott Tobias of The A.V. Club wrote in his review: "The premise for The Hills Have Eyes 2, the quickie follow-up to Alexandre Aja's skillful but gratuitous 2006 remake of Craven's original, seems like a perfect opportunity to give the mutants their due, since it deploys a group of military people back to the scene of the crime. And yet it stupidly does the opposite, reducing the mutants to mine-dwelling freaks who murder and rape because, well, that's what they do. After a prologue so repugnant that it's unworthy of description, the film touches down in New Mexico's "Sector 15", where a handful of military technicians are busy installing a top-secret surveillance system. When a group of National Guard trainees are dispatched to the site to deliver equipment, they're shocked to discover the men either missing or dead, and they start combing the surrounding hills on a search-and-rescue mission. What they don't realize is that the mutants are luring them into various traps designed to kill the men and abduct the women for (ugh) breeding purposes. So it's up to these unseasoned and often downright inept soldiers to fight their way out of trouble. Directed by music-video veteran Martin Weisz—in the future, can producers please look elsewhere for talent?—The Hills Have Eyes 2 assembles the most motley group of incompetents this side of a Police Academy movie, yet somehow misses the laughs."

== Soundtrack ==
The Hills Have Eyes 2: The Album

Film score by Various
- Released: July 31, 2007
- Genres: Hardcore punk; metalcore; thrash metal; hard rock; industrial rock
- Length: 48:08
- Label: Bulletproof Records

The Hill Have Eyes chronology
The Hills Have Eyes (2006)	The Hills Have Eyes 2: The Album (2007)

The soundtrack was released on July 31, 2007 via Bulletproof Records.

Track listing (US edition)

1. "The Hills Have Eyes" – Loud Lion
2. "My Fork in the Road (Your Knife in My Back)" – Atreyu
3. "Unretrofied" – The Dillinger Escape Plan
4. "Redemption" – Shadows Fall
5. "Darkest Nights" – As I Lay Dying
6. "Hard Rock Hallelujah" – Lordi
7. "Prayers" – In This Moment
8. "I Know Hollywood and You Ain't It" – Walls of Jericho
9. "Throwing Stones" – The End
10. "Failure in the Flesh – Through the Eyes of the Dead
11. "Sleeping with the Fishes, See?" – The Number Twelve Looks Like You
12. "Own Little World" (Remorse Code Remix) – Celldweller
