= The Hills Have Eyes Part II =

1984 film by Wes Craven

- Theatrical release poster
- Directed by: Wes Craven
- Written by: Wes Craven
- Produced by: Barry Cahn; Jonathan Debin; Peter Locke
- Starring: Tamara Stafford; Kevin Spirtas; John Bloom; Michael Berryman; Penny Johnson; Janus Blythe; John Laughlin; Willard E. Pugh; Peter Frechette; Robert Houston
- Cinematography: David Lewis
- Edited by: Richard Bracken
- Music by: Harry Manfredini
- Production companies: Hills Two Corporation; VTC
- Distributed by: Castle Hill Productions
- Release dates: October 13, 1984 (Spain); August 12, 1985 (United States)
- Running time: 90 minutes
- Country: United States
- Language: English
- Budget: $700,000 (estimated)

The Hills Have Eyes Part II is a 1984 American horror film written and directed by Wes Craven. The film stars Tamara Stafford, Kevin Spirtas, John Bloom, Michael Berryman, Penny Johnson, Janus Blythe, John Laughlin, Willard E. Pugh, Peter Frechette and Robert Houston. The Hills Have Eyes Part II is the sequel to the 1977 film. The film was produced by Barry Cahn, Jonathan Debin, and Peter Locke. The film premiered at Spain’s Sitges Film Festival in October 1984.

== Plot ==
After a voice-over narrates on an opening card, Bobby Carter and his psychiatrist are discussing the events of the first film, which took place eight years ago. Bobby is still traumatized by the events, but he and Rachel (formerly known as Ruby), who now owns a biker team, have also invented a super fuel that can power bikes. The team is due to race in the same desert where the original massacre took place. Bobby's psychiatrist advises him to go, but he declines and Rachel takes his place. The team, consisting of the blind Cass, her boyfriend Roy, Harry, Hulk, Foster, Jane and Sue, meets up by a bus and sets off. Along the way, they pick up Beast from a dog pound. Previously owned by the Carters, he now belongs to Rachel.

While going through the desert, they get lost and Harry suggests a shortcut through the bombing range. As they drive, the bus begins leaking fuel and they stop at an old mining ranch. As they explore the mine, Pluto, who apparently survived the earlier attack from Beast, attacks Rachel. She fights him off and he retreats, but no one believes her at first until Pluto returns and steals one of their bikes. Roy and Harry chase him down, but Harry falls behind, gets caught in a trap and is flattened by a massive rock. Roy catches Pluto, but is ambushed by a 7-foot cannibal called the Reaper, who knocks him unconscious. The Reaper is later revealed to be Papa Jupiter's older brother.

Meanwhile, the rest of the group stays at the mine until nightfall. They begin to worry about Roy and Harry, but Rachel and Hulk depart to look for them while the others stay behind. The Reaper begins to stalk the remaining teens. As Hulk and Rachel try to escape by motorcycle, the Reaper shoots Hulk through the chest with a spear bolt, leaving Rachel to run away in fear.

The Reaper returns to the mine, where he pulls Foster under the bus and kills him. Jane finds Foster's body just before the Reaper catches her and crushes her in his arms. Sue returns to the camp, only for the Reaper to throw her through a window and slit her throat with a machete. Rachel runs into Pluto, who pins her to the ground, but Beast surprises him and chases him away. Rachel tries to follow Beast, but runs into a trap set by the Reaper, which catapults Hulk's corpse against her. Slammed backwards, she trips and fatally hits the back of her head on a rock.

Meanwhile, Roy wakes up and runs into Pluto at the top of a cliff. Pluto gets ready to attack him, but Beast returns and knocks him off the cliff to his death. Cass runs from the Reaper and ends up in his mineshaft where he dumped the bodies, and comes across the corpses of her friends. She throws a jar of acid at the Reaper's face and escapes up a rope with help from Roy. The Reaper follows them, but they trap him in a bus full of bike fuel, set it on fire and watch as it explodes. The Reaper escapes from the wreckage covered in flames and attempts to kill them one last time, but he stumbles into an open mineshaft, falling to his death after which Roy and Cass embrace. The film ends with Roy, Cass and Beast walking away from the mine at sunrise, into the vast desert as they follow the road home.

== Cast ==
- Tamara Stafford as Cass
- Kevin Spirtas as Roy
- Robert Houston as Bobby Carter
- Edith Fellows as Mrs. Wilson
- John Bloom as The Reaper
- Michael Berryman as Pluto
- Janus Blythe as Rachel / Ruby
- Penny Johnson as Sue
- Colleen Riley as Jane
- David Nichols as The Psychiatrist
- Willard E. Pugh as Foster
- John Laughlin as Hulk
- Peter Frechette as Harry

Berryman, Blythe and Houston are the only returning actors from the first film; Susan Lanier, Virginia Vincent and James Whitworth appear through the use of archived footage from the first film.

== Production ==
The Hills Have Eyes Part II was shot, on a very low budget, in 1983. The production ceased prematurely due to a lack of funding.

== Reception ==
=== Critical response ===
The Hills Have Eyes Part II received negative reviews from critics. AllMovie called it "atrocious". Review aggregator Rotten Tomatoes gives the film a score of 13% based on reviews from 8 critics and a rating of 3.30 out of 10. Variety staff wrote in their review: "From then on, it's dull, formula terror pic cliches, with one attractive teenager after another picked off by the surviving cannibals."

In the book The Official Splatter Movie Guide, Volumes: 1963-1992: Hundreds of the Goriest, Grossest, Most Outrageous Films Ever Made by John McCarty, he states:

Writer–director Wes Craven must have thought we all suffer from amnesia, too, because he fills the sequel with clips from the first film to help us remember what happened in it. Either that or, because he really didn't have anything new up his sleeve, he was just trying pad out the running time. The movie is so bad that it was shelved for two years, never released theatrically, then sold to video and pay TV to help recoup some of the costs.

DVD Talk writes in its review:

The story goes that Wes Craven quickly disowned The Hills Have Eyes Part 2, hammering out a quick-and-dirty sequel because he desperately needed the cash. Remember, we're talking about the guy who cowrote the legendary killer-cellphone genre classic Pulse and directed the dreadful inner-city-inspirational-teacher flick Music of the Heart too; if he disowns a movie, as all over the place as his filmography is, it's gotta be painful. The really bizarre thing is that this was made in the wake of A Nightmare on Elm Street, a movie that was shot for next-to-nothing but is overflowing with imagination and boasts a dazzlingly inventive visual eye. That well must have been tapped completely dry when cameras started to roll on The Hills Have Eyes Part 2 however many months later. As disturbing as the original The Hills Have Eyes remains all these years later, the sequel doesn't deliver anything close to that.

== Release ==
The Hills Have Eyes Part II was released to a brief limited theatrical run in the United States on August 2, 1985, from the now defunct American independent film distributor Castle Hill Productions, and was released direct-to-video and pay television shortly thereafter. The Hills Have Eyes Part II was first released on DVD on March 20, 2012. Redemption and Kino Lorber films released a remastered edition of the film on Blu-ray on March 30, 2012. The film was also released on VHS by Thorn EMI and on LaserDisc by Republic Pictures.

== See also ==
- Mind Ripper, released in some areas as The Hills Have Eyes III
