= Invasion of the Scream Queens =

- Directed by: Donald Farmer
- Release date: 1992
- Country: United States

Invasion of the Scream Queens is a 1992 documentary film by American filmmaker Donald Farmer. The film interviews the women who have made a career out of starring in the B horror and science fiction genres are interviewed, and clips and trailers from their films are shown. It was produced by Mondo Video (1992) (USA) and released on VHS format.

== Cast ==
- Michelle Bauer
- Martine Beswick
- Janus Blythe
- Veronica Carothers
- Ruth Collins
- Monique Gabrielle
- Marya Gant
- Katina Garner
- Liz Kagan
- Elizabeth Kaitan
- Melissa Moore
- Tammara Souza
- Deborah Stern
- Brinke Stevens
- Mary Woronov

== See also ==
- List of documentaries
