= The Incredible 2-Headed Transplant =

1971 film directed by Anthony Lanza

- Theatrical release poster
- Directed by: Anthony M. Lanza
- Written by: James Gordon White; John Lawrence
- Produced by: John Lawrence; Volodymyr Kowal; Nicholas Wowchuk; Alvin L. Fast; Arthur N. Gilbert; Sheldon Lee
- Starring: Bruce Dern; Patricia Ann Priest; Casey Kasem; Albert Cole; John Bloom
- Cinematography: Glen Gano; Paul Hipp; Jack Steely
- Edited by: Anthony Lanza
- Music by: John Barber
- Production company: American International Pictures
- Release date: April 14, 1971 (Los Angeles)
- Running time: 87 min.
- Country: United States
- Language: English

The Incredible 2-Headed Transplant is a 1971 science fiction/horror film directed by Anthony Lanza. It is sometimes confused with the 1972 blaxploitation film The Thing with Two Heads.

== Plot ==
Dr. Roger Girard (Bruce Dern) is a wealthy scientist experimenting with head transplantation. His caretaker has a son named Danny (John Bloom) who is an extremely strong full-grown man, but he has the mind of a child due to brain damage sustained in a mine accident. In an unusual turn of events, Manuel Cass (Albert Cole), a recently escaped mental patient and serial killer, has murdered Dr. Girard's caretaker and is seriously injured himself. Given an unprecedented chance to use human subjects – a mortally wounded psychotic and a disabled man with little chance of surviving on his own, neither of whom he thinks will be missed – Dr. Girard transplants Cass's head onto Danny's body to prove that his techniques can be applied to human beings. The new creature, with one head of a murderer and the other with the mental capacity of an eight-year-old attached to an extremely powerful body, escapes and wreaks havoc, committing multiple murders.

After the creature kidnaps Linda Girard (Pat Priest), Dr. Girard, Dr. Max (Berry Kroeger), and Dr. Anderson (Casey Kasem) pursue it to an abandoned mine. Anderson rescues Linda, but Dr. Girard, Max, and the creature die in a mine cave-in.

== Cast ==
- Bruce Dern as Dr. Roger Girard
- Pat Priest as Linda Girard
- Casey Kasem as Dr. Ken Anderson
- Albert Cole as Manuel Cass
- John Bloom as Danny Norton
  - Leslie Cole as Young Danny
- Berry Kroeger as Dr. Max
- Larry Vincent as Andrew Norton
- Jack Lester as the Sheriff
- Jerry Patterson as the Deputy
- Darlene Duralia as Miss Pierce
- Raymond Thorne as Motorcyclist #1
- Gary Kent as Motorcyclist #2
- Mary Ellen Clawsen as Female Motorcyclist
- Janice P. Gelman as Teenage victim
- Mike Espe as Teenage victim
- Andrew Schneider as Teenager
- Eva Sorensen as Teenager

== Production ==
The film was shot in six days in Santa Clarita, California. Lead actor Bruce Dern claimed he never got paid for his services.

== Reception ==
Variety called the film "rank exploitation fodder" directed "lifelessly," though it called the makeup and design of the two-headed creature "good." Gene Siskel of the Chicago Tribune gave the film 1 star out 4, writing that if the film "had focused more on the conflict of the two heads with, say, some extended conversations in close-up, it could have been one of the great bad movies. Instead, we get repetitive shots of the killer drooling while the giant whines 'no, no.'" Kevin Thomas of the Los Angeles Times called the film "lots of fun because this AIP release has been so thoroughly worked out, with good, legitimate performances, logical plot development and taut directing and editing." David McGillivray of The Monthly Film Bulletin wrote, "Uproarious nonsense, looking very much like a piece of low budget Fifties horror and performed with very little finesse, but quite watchable none the less."

== In popular culture ==
In 1989, horror punk band Haunted Garage recorded a song of the same title based on the film for their 7-inch EP Mothers Day.

== See also ==
- List of American films of 1971
