= Janus Blythe =

American actress

Janus Blythe (born January 29, 1951) is an American actress and scream queen known for her roles in horror films. She played major roles in films by Wes Craven, Tobe Hooper, and other major horror film directors during the latter half of the twentieth century.

A major role was that of Ruby, a feral girl in the middle of the Nevada desert, in the original 1977 film The Hills Have Eyes directed by Wes Craven. Craven wanted the actress playing the role to be a fast runner, and Blythe won the role by racing other girls trying out for the role and beating them.

== Filmography ==
Film performances
Year	Title	Role	Notes
1974	The Centerfold Girls	Roommate	(as Janis Lynn)
1974	Phantom of the Paradise	Groupie	(as Janis Eve Lynn)
1975	Aloha, Bobby and Rose	Bar waitress / dancer	
1976	C.B. Hustlers	The C.B. Hustlers	(as Janice Jordan)
1976	The Cheerleaders	Cheerleader	
1976	Eaten Alive	Lynette	(as Janus Blyth)
1976	Drive-In Massacre	Alan's Date	(as Tiffany Jones)
1977	Black Oak Conspiracy	Melba Barnes	
1977	The Hills Have Eyes	Ruby	
1977	The Incredible Melting Man	Nell Winters	
1978	Zuma Beach	Jennifer	
1980	Marilyn: The Untold Story	unknown role	
1984	The Hills Have Eyes Part II	Rachel / Ruby	
1986	Spine	Carrie Lonegan	
1992	Invasion of the Scream Queens		Herself
2010	Video Nasties: Moral Panic, Censorship & Videotape		Archive Footage
