= Zuma Beach (film) =

1978 television film by Lee H. Katzin

- Genre: Comedy; Drama
- Teleplay by: John Carpenter; William A. Schwartz
- Story by: John Herman Shaner & Al Ramrus
- Directed by: Lee H. Katzin
- Starring: Suzanne Somers; Steven Keats; Mark Wheeler; Kimberly Beck
- Music by: Dick Halligan
- Country of origin: United States
- Original language: English

Production
- Executive producers: Daniel H. Blatt; Edgar J. Scherick
- Producers: Bruce Cohn Curtis; Brian Grazer
- Cinematography: Héctor R. Figueroa
- Editors: Bobbie Shapiro; Robert L. Swanson
- Running time: 98 minutes
- Production companies: Bruce Cohn Curtis Films, Ltd. Edgar J. Scherick Associates; Warner Bros. Television

Original release
- Network: NBC
- Release: September 27, 1978

Zuma Beach is a 1978 TV movie written by John Carpenter and William Schwartz, directed by Lee H. Katzin and starring Suzanne Somers.

== Plot ==
A fading rock singer goes to the beach to get away from it all and winds up getting involved in the lives of the teenage beachgoers.

== Cast ==
- Suzanne Somers as Bonnie Katt
- Steven Keats as Jerry McCabe
- Mark Wheeler as David Hunter
- Kimberly Beck as Cathy
- Perry Lang as Billy
- Michael Biehn as J.D.
- Biff Warren as Norman
- Les Lannom as Stan
- Rosanna Arquette as Beverly
- Gary Imhoff as Frank
- Leonard Stone as Johnson
- Steve Franken as Rick
- Richard Molinare as Frank
- Tanya Roberts as Denise
- P.J. Soles as Nancy
- Timothy Hutton as Art
- Janus Blythe as Jennifer

== History ==
Suzanne Somers' fame was rising due to the success of the sitcom Three's Company, and she wanted to star in movies. Although a lightweight TV movie, Zuma Beach provided Somers with her first starring movie role.

John Carpenter wrote the script for a producer "who just said he wanted a beach movie." He sold it to Warner Bros., and it became a TV movie to star Suzanne Somers. Carpenter said he "was going to direct it, for about 10 seconds, but one of my mentors, Richard Kobritz...helped me see I didn't want to do it. It was vastly rewritten, so I really shouldn't have taken credit for it, but I was a little asshole in those days."

Tim Hutton had one of his first roles in the film.

== Reception ==
The Los Angeles Times praised the naturalness of Somers' performance.
