= John Bloom (actor) =

American actor (1944–1999)

- Born: February 19, 1944; Los Angeles, California, U.S.
- Died: January 15, 1999 (aged 54); Los Angeles, California, U.S.
- Occupation: Actor
- Height: 7 ft 4 in (2.24 m)

John Bloom (February 19, 1944 – January 15, 1999) was an American actor.

== Career ==
Standing at 7 ft 4 in (2.24 m) tall, he is most famous for his roles as the Frankenstein Monster in the low-budget horror movie Dracula vs. Frankenstein (he remains the tallest actor to ever portray the character), and the unfortunate recipient in The Incredible 2-Headed Transplant.

He also had a role in The Dark, played Milt in Bachelor Party, and The Reaper in The Hills Have Eyes Part II. He had minor roles in Harry and the Hendersons and Star Trek VI: The Undiscovered Country. He played the blacksmith "Tiny" on the TV series Paradise and Guns of Paradise.

Bloom died from heart failure brought on by his immense height on January 15, 1999, in his home city of Los Angeles.

== Filmography ==
Year	Title	Role	Notes
1971	Up Your Alley	Bruno	
1971	The Incredible 2-Headed Transplant	Danny	
1971	Brain of Blood	Gor	
1971	Dracula vs. Frankenstein	The Frankenstein Monster	
1972	Hard on the Trail		
1972	Angels' Wild Women	Big Foot	
1979	The Dark	The Dark	
1984	The Hills Have Eyes Part II	The Reaper	
1984	Bachelor Party	Milt	
1985	Runaway Train	Tall Con	
1987	Harry and the Hendersons	Feet	
1988	The Great Outdoors	Jimbo	
1991	Star Trek VI: The Undiscovered Country	Behemoth Alien	
1992	Frozen Assets	Ed Walker	
