= Spine (film) =

1986 American horror film

- Directed by: John Howard, Justin Simmonds
- Release date: 1986
- Country: United States

Spine is a 1986 American horror film written and directed by John Howard and Justin Simmonds and starring Janus Blythe.

== Plot ==
A madman stalks nurses, brutally stabbing them to death. In his fevered mind, he believes his victims to be a woman from his past named Linda. Police struggle to apprehend him before he can murder and mutilate again.

== Cast ==
- Kathy Rose as First Victim
- R. Eric Huxley as Lawrence Ashton
- John Howard as Leo Meadows (as Antoine Herzog)
- Bill Eberwein as Chuck Roast
- Marie Dowling as Lori Anderson
- Dan Watson as Man in Office
- Abby Sved as Louise Morton
- James Simonds as Police Captain
- Donna Sayles as Bobbie Jones
- Carl Elliot as Sam Joffrey
- Larry Nielson as Charlie Saunders
- Lise Romanoff as Leah Petralla
- Janus Blythe as Carrie Lonegan
- Brenda Brandon as Computer Technician
- Terry Simonds as At Police Headquarters
- Jason Eberweinas At Police Headquarters
- Roger Watkins as At Police Headquarters (as Ray Hicks)

== Release ==
It was released directly to video somewhere in 1986.
