= Mind Ripper =

- Promotional release poster
- Directed by: Joe Gayton
- Written by: Jonathan Craven; Phil Mittleman
- Produced by: Jonathan Craven; Wes Craven; Peter Sheperd
- Starring: Lance Henriksen; Giovanni Ribisi; Natasha Wagner; Claire Stansfield; John Diehl
- Cinematography: Fernando Argüelles
- Edited by: Harry Hitner
- Music by: J. Peter Robinson
- Production companies: Outpost Productions; The Kushner-Locke Company
- Release dates: August 1995 (UK); October 8, 1995 (U.S.)
- Running time: 96 minutes
- Country: United States
- Language: English
- Budget: $5 million

Mind Ripper (also known as The Hills Have Eyes III, The Outpost or Wes Craven Presents Mind Ripper) is a 1995 American horror film released on HBO. It stars Lance Henriksen and Giovanni Ribisi.

Although it is marketed in some areas as a sequel to the original The Hills Have Eyes and The Hills Have Eyes Part II, no actors, characters, or scenarios link it to those films. Its only connection, aside from the desert location, is producer Wes Craven, who wrote and directed the other two films, and his son Jonathan Craven, who is credited as a writer.

== Plot ==
Set in a remote desert location, government scientists Alex, Joanne, Frank, Larry and Rob perform reanimation experiments in an underground nuclear facility. The goal is to create a superhuman. Their subject, "Thor", is a specimen from a suicide found in the desert. In the attempts to bring Thor back, an uncontrollable creature is unleashed. The next morning, Alex calls Stockton, one of the prior overseers of the project, at his home, After an argument, Stockton eventually decides to visit the facility by plane. His son Scott, his daughter Wendy, and Wendy's boyfriend Mark join him.

After Thor is reanimated, he kills Frank and Larry in the test room, leaving Alex, Joanne and Rob to attempt to escape. Alex erases his handprint for the exit, intending to keep Thor alive, before he is pulled into the vents. Joanne and Rob examine old blueprints of the facility in an attempt to find another exit, but Rob is killed while trying to rewire the power, leaving Joanne by herself. Meanwhile, Stockton arrives with the others in tow, and enters the facility. While this is going on, Thor is revealed to be undergoing a form of genetic mutation and needs the sterols from the brainstem to stay alive, for which he sprouts a pincer from his mouth and uses it to take the bound Alex's sterol, killing him.

Stockton and the others split up. After Wendy sees the facility's experiments she becomes upset with her father's involvement and storms off. Mark goes off to find her, while Stockton goes to find the scientists, and Scott stays in the rec room. Stockton finds Larry's body and heads back to get the others out of the facility. Thor sneaks into the rec room and almost kills Scott, but the microwave timer goes off, the loud noise incapacitates Thor, and Stockton is able to save Scott. They eventually come across Joanne and she explains the situation. They attempt to escape, but Thor catches up to them and captures Stockton, taking him into the vent shafts, where he recognizes Stockton from the earlier stages of the experiment and continues to further mutate. Later, Thor attacks the others and kills Joanne, Mark and Scott, before moving on to Wendy, who sprouts a pincer from her mouth; this is revealed to be a dream of Thor's.

Meanwhile, Joanne and the others try to devise a way to kill Thor by leaving a trail of sterols to lead him into a freezer room and trap him there. The plan goes awry when Thor comes up behind them and kills Mark. Joanne is able to knock him into the freezer, but with the hand codes unavailable, they are still locked into the facility. However, they find Stockton still alive and use his handprint to escape. They drive away, but Thor has stowed away and attacks them again. Scott uses a piece of glass to cut off Thor's pincer before he can use it. When they get to the plane, Thor attacks them again. Joanne shoots him with a shotgun and he falls off. The survivors fly to safety and Thor is shown motionless where he has fallen, until his hand twitches, indicating he is still alive.

== Cast ==
- Lance Henriksen as Dr. Jim Stockton
- Claire Stansfield as Joanne
- John Diehl as Alex Hunter
- Natasha Gregson Wagner as Wendy Stockton
- Gregory Sporleder as Rob
- Giovanni Ribisi as Scott Stockton
- Dan Blom as Thor
- Adam Solomon as Mark
- John Apicella as Larry
- Peter Shepherd as Frank

== Production ==
The film was written by Jonathan Craven and intended by his father to be a third The Hills Have Eyes film, but during development Craven decided to rewrite the script and remove any overt references to the previous films.

== Soundtrack ==
- "Mammals", Lucifer Wong (Wong Music/BMI)
- "Blacknailed Fingers", Terrordactyl (Hatchet Blade/BMI)
- "Back Down", Charley Horse (Hatchet Blade/BMI)
- "Bandit Swings", Terrordactyl (Hatchet Blade/BMI)
- "Bodies Piled Up", Charley Horse (Hatchet Blade/BMI)

All music property of Hellnote Recordings
