= Susan Lanier =

American actress

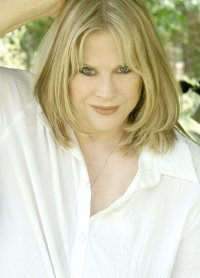
- Occupations: Film and television actress, entertainer
- Years active: 1967–1984, 2001–present
- Spouse: Delaney Bramlett (died 2008)

Susan Lanier-Bramlett is an American actress.

== Career ==
Lanier had a guest appearance on Welcome Back, Kotter where she played a flirtatious student named Bambi, who initially makes a move on Gabe. During the 1970s, she guest starred on shows such as Barnaby Jones, Electra Woman and Dyna Girl, Alice, Police Woman and Eight is Enough.

In 1976, she starred alongside John Ritter and Joyce DeWitt in the second pilot for Three's Company on ABC. Lanier, who served as the original choice by the producers to portray the newly created character Chrissy Snow, replaced Susanne Zenor in the cast when the characters, that were directly based from the original British sitcom Man About The House were done away with, but Lanier herself was then replaced by Suzanne Somers. In 1977, Lanier starred in the original cult classic, The Hills Have Eyes. She also starred as Sandi Chandler on the television series Szysznyk from 1977 – 1978.

She was a series regular on Tony Orlando and Dawn's Rainbow Hour for a season on CBS doing stand-up and comedy sketches with the show's guests. In the late 1970s, Lanier starred at The Ahmanson Theatre in Los Angeles in a production of Tennessee Williams' Night of the Iguana which starred Richard Chamberlain. In 1972 she portrayed Bobbi Michele in Last of the Red Hot Lovers at the Plaza Dinner Theater in San Antonio, Texas.

== Personal life ==
She was married to musician Delaney Bramlett; she was Bramlett's third wife, following his divorce from Bonnie Bramlett and Kim Carmel Bramlett. Delaney died in 2008 from complications of gall bladder surgery. Lanier said that they were married on April 20, 2005, but a petition filed in Los Angeles County Superior Court in April 2009 questioned whether they were legally married. The petition filed by Bramlett's daughter Michele challenged a trust that he had left. The petition primarily focused on assertions that when Bramlett signed the trust he was mentally unsound and was unduly influenced by Lanier.

== Photographer ==
Lanier became a portrait photographer for magazines, book covers, and album covers, and in 2005 was voted one of LA's top ten photographers by Backstage West.
