= Jonathan Craven =

American writer and director

- Born: March 20, 1965 (age 60); New Castle, Pennsylvania, U.S.
- Occupation(s): Writer, director, producer
- Years active: 1972–present
- Parent(s): Wes Craven; Bonnie Broecker

Jonathan Craven (born March 20, 1965) is an American writer and director. He is the son of filmmaker Wes Craven and Bonnie Broecker. He co-wrote the horror sequel The Hills Have Eyes 2 and worked on the short-lived NBC horror series Nightmare Cafe. He managed the Chapin Sisters for a year in 2005. He also co-produced the 2009 remake of The Last House on the Left, which is a remake of the 1972 version written, directed and edited by his father, Wes Craven.

== Filmography ==
- The Last House on the Left (1972) (actor; boy with balloon; uncredited)
- Shocker (1989) (actor; Jogger) (visual effects coordinator) (post-production apprentice editor)
- A Gnome Named Gnorm (1990) (art department assistant)
- Framed (1990) (TV movie) (property assistant)
- Wes Craven's New Nightmare (1994) (assistant to props: additional shooting)
- Mind Ripper (1995) (producer) (writer)
- The Minus Man (1999) (property master)
- They Shoot Divas, Don't They? (2002) (TV movie) (director)
- The Hills Have Eyes 2 (2007) (writer) (co-producer)
- The Last House on the Left (2009) (co-producer)
- Charm (2012) (producer)
- Stone Cold Fox (2025) (producer)

Music videos

- Lifter: "The Rich, Dark, Sultry Red of Hate" (1996)
- Lifter: "Headshot" (1996)
