= The People Under the Stairs =

1991 American horror film by Wes Craven

- Theatrical release poster
- Directed by: Wes Craven
- Written by: Wes Craven
- Produced by: Stuart M. Besser; Marianne Maddalena
- Starring: Brandon Adams; Everett McGill; Wendy Robie; A. J. Langer
- Cinematography: Sandi Sissel
- Edited by: James Coblentz
- Music by: Don Peake; Graeme Revell
- Production company: Alive Films
- Distributed by: Universal Pictures
- Release date: November 1, 1991
- Running time: 102 minutes
- Country: United States
- Language: English
- Budget: $6 million
- Box office: $31.3 million

The People Under the Stairs is a 1991 American comedy horror film written and directed by Wes Craven, and starring Brandon Adams, Everett McGill, Wendy Robie, A. J. Langer and Ving Rhames. The plot follows a young boy and two adult robbers who become trapped in a house belonging to a neighborhood's crooked landlords after breaking in to steal their collection of gold coins as the boy learns a dark secret about them and what also lurks in their house.

Craven has stated that The People Under the Stairs was partially inspired by a news story from the late 1970s, in which two burglars broke into a Los Angeles household, inadvertently causing the police to discover two children who had been locked away by their parents. The film was a surprise commercial success, and has been analyzed for its satirical depiction of gentrification, class warfare, and capitalism.

== Plot ==
Poindexter "Fool" Williams is a resident of a Los Angeles ghetto. He and his family are being evicted from their apartment by their landlords, the Robesons. The Robesons, believed to be a married couple, call themselves Mommy and Daddy, and buy poorly maintained apartment buildings, purposefully raising the rent to evict the occupants so they can sell the buildings to gentrifiers. They have a daughter named Alice, whom they abuse severely. Fool's mother has cancer but cannot afford treatment. A man named Leroy convinces Fool to help him commit burglary to pay for her surgery.

Leroy, his associate Spenser, and Fool break into the Robesons' house by using Spenser to pose as a municipal worker. The Robesons leave the home shortly after, but Spenser does not return. Fool and Leroy break into the house to look for Spenser, and Fool finds his dead body along with a large group of strange, pale children in a locked pen inside a dungeon-like basement.

The Robesons return, and Fool flees while Leroy is shot to death by Daddy. Fool runs into another section of the house where he meets Alice. She tells him that the people under the stairs were children who broke the "see/hear/speak no evil" rules of the Robeson household. The children have degenerated into cannibalism to survive, and Alice has avoided this fate by obeying the rules without question. A boy named Roach, whose tongue was removed as punishment for calling out for help to escape, also evades the Robesons by hiding in the walls.

Fool is discovered by Daddy and is thrown to the cannibalistic children to die. However, Roach helps Fool escape, but is critically wounded. As he dies, he gives Fool a small bag of gold coins and a written plea to save Alice. Fool reunites with Alice, and the two escape into the passageways between the walls. Daddy releases his Rottweiler dog, Prince, into the walls to kill them. Fool tricks Daddy into stabbing Prince, and he and Alice reach the attic where they find an open window above a pond. Alice is too afraid to jump, and Fool is forced to escape without her, but he promises to return for her.

Taking the coins to his grandfather, Fool learns that he has enough gold to pay for his mother's surgery and ten years worth of rent. He also finds out that Mommy and Daddy are actually brother and sister, coming from a long line of disturbed, inbred family members who built their fortune by running a funeral home, selling cheap coffins for expensive prices. They later entered the real estate business, leading them to become greedier and more unhinged. Fool vows to help right the wrongs. He reports the Robesons to child welfare, and as the police investigate the house, Fool sneaks back in and reveals to Alice that she is not their daughter, as she was stolen from her birth parents, as were all the other children in the basement.

Mommy finds out that Alice knows the truth and believes that Fool has turned her against them, so she attempts to kill Alice. However, her actions are witnessed by a crowd of the Robesons' evictees, exposing their crimes. Fool frees the cannibal children from the basement and they kill Mommy, with Alice's help. Grateful for freeing them, they show Fool a secret vault, where the Robesons collected all the money they have stolen from their tenants over the years. He also finds a box of dynamite stored there.

Daddy finds Fool at the vault, where Fool sets off the explosives, demolishing the house and causing the money to blow up through the crematorium chimney and into the crowd of people outside. Daddy is killed in the explosion, and Alice and Fool reunite in the basement. Meanwhile, the people outside claim the money distributed by the blast, and the freed children venture into the night.

== Cast ==
- Brandon Adams as Poindexter "Fool" Williams
- Everett McGill as Eldon Robeson / Daddy
- Wendy Robie as Mrs. Robeson / Mommy
- A. J. Langer as Alice Robeson
- Ving Rhames as Leroy
- Bill Cobbs as Grandpa Booker
- Kelly Jo Minter as Ruby Williams
- Sean Whalen as Roach
- Jeremy Roberts as Spenser
- Yan Birch as Stairmaster

== Themes ==
Noel Murray of The A.V. Club wrote that "footage from the first Gulf War on the Robesons' TV—coupled with the depiction of them as a wealth-hoarding perversion of the typical upstanding suburban couple—marks the movie as a satire", and called the Mommy and Daddy characters a "cartoonish parody of conservatism”. S.C. Dacy of Empire and Brett Gallman of ComingSoon.net saw the Robesons as camouflaged, nightmare versions of Ronald and Nancy Reagan". Jonny Coleman of LA Weekly called the film "a satire of late capitalism, specifically in an L.A. run ragged by the free market of the '80s and the violence it created", also noting comparisons between the Robesons and the Reagans, and comparing them to more contemporary figures like Donald Sterling and Donald Trump.

In a 1991 interview with Fangoria, writer-director Wes Craven stated that the film "is much closer to The Hills Have Eyes than anything I've done in a long time ... It's a raw film with no dreams in it whatsoever. It's an extraordinary, real situation involving an awful family that shouldn't exist, but unfortunately, often does." In the 2015 Blu-ray commentary track released by Scream Factory, Craven refers to the Robesons' house as representing "the whole society of the United States".

== Production ==
The film is notable for its protagonist "being a working-class Black child ... a rare sight in an R-rated studio horror film". In a promotional interview in Cinefantastique, Craven "positioned this intersection of youth, social marginalization, and horror as an obvious match". According to Craven, the film's story was partially inspired by a real-life news story from 1978. The case involved two African-American burglars who made a forced entry into a house in Los Angeles, California, which unintentionally led to the local law enforcement discovering a pair of children who had been locked away by their parents. Craven said what appealed to him about the premise was the idea that hideous atrocities can hide beneath the surface of apparent normalcy. Craven worried that Universal wouldn't respond to the script due to the protagonist being a young black kid as the male lead and the bizarre nature of the premise, but Tom Pollock and James Jacks were very supportive of the concept.

The film was made on a relatively low budget of $6 million, without significant studio interference. The Thomas W. Phillips residence, located at 2215 S. Harvard Blvd in Los Angeles and former home of Butterfly McQueen, was used as the Robeson house. Everett McGill and Wendy Robie were cast as the Robesons after having starred together as the married couple "Big" Ed and Nadine Hurley in the television series Twin Peaks. Craven stated that he conceptualized the house as a human mind where the exterior and first floor were relatively normal while deeper within, the house revealed itself to be more twisted and bizarre.

=== Post-production ===
As Craven's prior films had struggled to secure R-ratings from the MPAA, Craven expected the film to be given an NC-17 rating due to the bizarre subject matter and child protagonists. However, the MPAA only requested alterations to one sequence of McGill's character gutting a victim and tossing the liver to the titular people under the stairs, removing a shot of McGill biting into the gelatine liver prop designed by KNB EFX Group. Craven was taken aback by the MPAA's relative leniency and theorized the film's relatively more optimistic and sometimes humorous approach and underlying positive social statement may have been factors in his favor. Craven also chose to cut two scenes: a sequence at the end where Fool has a second tarot card reading by his sister Ruby, changing his name from "Fool" to "King", was cut for pacing reasons as the audience got antsy after the film left the house, and a jump scare ending which would've seen Eldon Robeson emerge alive, as Craven felt the audience would have felt cheated and he had no intention of doing a sequel.

== Release ==
=== Box office ===
The film opened at the No. 1 spot at the box office, taking in over $5.5 million that weekend (earning back most of its production budget), and stayed in the top 10 for a month until early December. It went on to gross over $24,204,154 domestically (U.S.) and $7,143,000 internationally, bringing its worldwide total to $31,347,154. The film released in the United Kingdom on December 27, 1991, and in Australia on April 9, 1992.

=== Critical reception ===
On the review aggregator website Rotten Tomatoes, 67% of 36 critics' reviews are positive, with an average rating of 6.0/10. The website's consensus reads: "Held aloft by gonzo black comedy and socially conscious subtext, The People Under The Stairs marks a unique -- though wildly uneven -- change of pace for writer-director Wes Craven." Metacritic, which uses a weighted average, assigned the film a score of 57 out of 100, based on 15 critics, indicating "mixed or average" reviews.

Marjorie Baumgarten of The Austin Chronicle wrote that "this is the work of the Wes Craven we came to admire". Vincent Canby, writing for The New York Times, described The People Under the Stairs as "an affirmative-action horror film", containing "its share of blood and gore", and lauded the film for being "mostly creepy and, considering the bizarre circumstances, surprisingly funny" in that "it's impossible not to like fiends who, having just dispatched someone in an especially nasty way, can't contain their natural high spirits. They dance."

Chicago-based Siskel & Ebert had mixed responses to the movie on their TV show. Roger Ebert of The Chicago Sun-Times gave the movie a "thumbs down" review and admitted a distaste for gory horror films but nonetheless gave Craven credit for "creating a distinctive visual world" featuring dark humor and biting social commentary. Gene Siskel of The Chicago Tribune gave The People Under the Stairs a reserved "thumbs up", warning viewers about some disturbing material but also saying "if you like this kind of picture, [Craven] does it as well as you can imagine."

Richard Harrington of The Washington Post criticized Craven's directing, going on to state that "Craven also wrote the script here, based on a news story about California parents who kept their children locked in the basement for many years. That's scary -- and so is how far Craven has fallen." Nigel Floyd of Time Out wrote of the film that "There are a few push-button frights, but a total dearth of mind-disturbing terror; the humour, too, is broad, crowd-pleasing stuff".

Dacy of Empire gave the film four out of five possible stars and called it "brilliantly deceptive", writing that it is "Not just a disturbing ride but also a hard-hitting political statement". Brent McKnight of PopMatters wrote that the film "is a careful synthesis of genres, steeped in horror, with a satiric bite, and action and thriller traits thrown in just for the hell of it", calling it "easily one of the director's most original, deranged, and off the wall films".

=== Accolades ===
Award	Category	Subject	Result
Avoriaz Fantastic Film Festival	Special Jury Award	Wes Craven	Won
Brussels International Fantastic Film Festival	Pegasus Audience Award	Wes Craven	Won
Fangoria Chainsaw Awards	Best Wide Release Film		Nominated
Fangoria Chainsaw Awards	Best Screenplay	Wes Craven	Nominated
Fangoria Chainsaw Awards	Best Actor	Everett McGill	Nominated
Fangoria Chainsaw Awards	Best Actress	Wendy Robie	Nominated
Fangoria Chainsaw Awards	Best Supporting Actress	A. J. Langer	Nominated
Fangoria Chainsaw Awards	Best Makeup/Creature FX	KNB EFX Group	Nominated
Saturn Award	Best Performance by a Younger Actor	Brandon Adams	Nominated

== Home media ==
The People Under the Stairs was released on VHS by MCA/Universal Home Video in the spring of 1992, again in 1999, and was later released on DVD in 2003. The film received a Blu-ray release in Region B by Arrow Video on November 4, 2013, featuring a high-definition transfer of the film, and an audio commentary by actor Brandon Adams moderated by Calum Waddell, along with various interviews and a theatrical trailer. The film was released in Region A as a Blu-ray Collector's Edition by Scream Factory in 2015, featuring audio commentaries by Wes Craven with Michael Felsher, and by actors Brandon Adams, A. J. Langer, Sean Whalen, and Yan Birch. The Scream Factory release also includes interviews with members of the cast and crew, behind-the-scenes footage, a "making of" featurette, a theatrical trailer, and TV spots. In 2023, Scream Factory released a two-disc 4K UHD/Blu-ray Collector's Edition featuring a new restoration from the original camera negative, Dolby Vision HDR, three audio commentaries and archival interviews.

In France, the film was released on VHS in 1999, DVD in 2002 and Blu-ray in 2014. In Germany, a limited mediabook comprising one Blu-ray and two DVDs was issued in 2018. It included German and English audio, commentary tracks, interviews, making-of material and a gallery. In Italy, the film received a 2020 Blu-ray release which included Italian and English soundtracks and audio commentaries by Wes Craven and cast members.

== Remake and possible television series ==
Craven at one point said he would like to remake the film along with The Last House on the Left and Shocker. However, after the release of the 2009 remake of The Last House on the Left, the remake fell dormant until 2015, when it was announced (shortly before Craven's death) that the director was developing a People Under the Stairs TV series for Syfy.

On October 30, 2020, Collider reported that Jordan Peele and Win Rosenfeld signed on to produce a remake under Monkeypaw Productions for Universal Pictures.

== Legacy ==
The film influenced Gerard Johnstone's horror comedy Housebound (2014). Johnstone described The People Under the Stairs as a "huge influence", saying that after rewatching it he could see where many of his ideas for Housebound had originated.

Universal Studios Florida has incorporated Mommy and Daddy's house, along with other elements of the film's plot, into a maze attraction in the past for their annual Halloween Horror Nights event. It was also featured on the drive-in movie screen in the Twister...Ride it Out attraction.
