= Wes Craven =

American filmmaker (1939–2015)

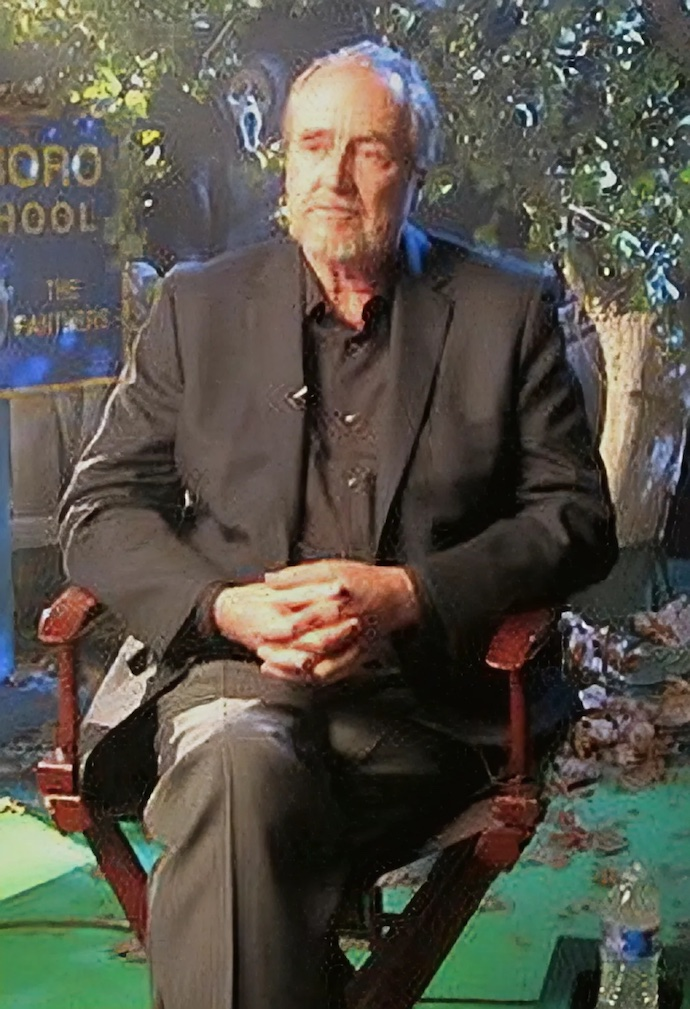
- Craven in 2010
- Born: Wesley Earl Craven; August 2, 1939; Cleveland, Ohio, U.S.
- Died: August 30, 2015 (aged 76); Los Angeles, California, U.S.
- Resting place: Lambert's Cove Cemetery; West Tisbury, Massachusetts
- Other names: Abe Snake; Guru of Gore; Master of Horror; Sultan of Shock
- Education: Wheaton College; Johns Hopkins University
- Occupations: Film director; screenwriter; producer; actor; editor
- Years active: 1968–2015
- Known for: A Nightmare on Elm Street; Scream; The People Under the Stairs; The Hills Have Eyes; The Last House on the Left; Red Eye; Music of the Heart; Swamp Thing; The Serpent and the Rainbow; Vampire In Brooklyn
- Spouses: Bonnie Broecker (m. 1964; div. 1969) Mimi Craven (m. 1984; div. 1987) Iya Labunka (m. 2004)
- Children: 2, including Jonathan

Signature
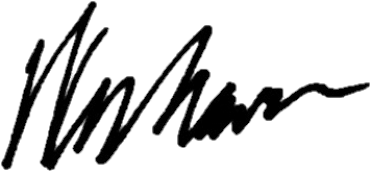

Wesley Earl Craven (August 2, 1939 – August 30, 2015) was an American filmmaker. Amongst his prolific filmography, Craven worked primarily in the horror genre, particularly slasher films, where he mixed horror cliches with humor. Craven has been recognized as one of the masters of the horror genre.

Craven created the A Nightmare on Elm Street franchise (1984–present), writing and directing the first film, co-writing and producing the third, A Nightmare on Elm Street 3: Dream Warriors (1987), and writing and directing the seventh, Wes Craven's New Nightmare (1994). He directed the first four films in the Scream franchise (1996–2011). He directed cult classics The Last House on the Left (1972) and The Hills Have Eyes (1977), the horror comedy The People Under the Stairs (1991), and psychological thriller Red Eye (2005). His other notable films include Swamp Thing (1982), The Serpent and the Rainbow (1988), Shocker (1989), Vampire in Brooklyn (1995), and Music of the Heart (1999).

Craven received several accolades across his career, which includes a Scream Award, a Sitges Film Festival Award, a Fangoria Chainsaw Award, and nominations for a Saturn Award. In 1995, he was honored by the Academy of Science Fiction, Fantasy and Horror Films with the Life Career Award, for his accomplishments in the horror genre. In 2012, the New York City Horror Film Festival awarded Craven the Lifetime Achievement Award.

On August 30, 2015, aged 76, Craven died of a brain tumor at his home in Los Angeles.

== Early life ==
Craven was born in Cleveland, Ohio, the son of Caroline (née Miller) and Paul Eugene Craven. He was of English, Scottish, and German descent. He was raised in a strict Baptist family. From 1957 to 1963 Craven earned an undergraduate degree in English and psychology from Wheaton College in Illinois. During his senior year, he developed Guillain-Barré Syndrome which delayed his graduation by a few months. After his recovery, Craven went on to get his master's degree in philosophy and writing from Johns Hopkins University.

In 1964–65, Craven taught English at Westminster College in New Wilmington, Pennsylvania, and was a humanities professor at Clarkson College of Technology (later named Clarkson University) in Potsdam, New York. He also taught at Madrid–Waddington High School in Madrid, New York. During this time, he purchased a used 16 mm film camera and began making short movies. His friend Steve Chapin informed him of a messenger position at a New York City film production company, where his brother, future folk-rock star Harry Chapin worked. Craven moved into the building where his friend Steve Chapin lived at 136 Hicks St. in Brooklyn Heights. His first creative job in the film industry was as a sound editor.

Recalling his early training, Craven said in 1994, "Harry was a fantastic film editor and producer of industrials. He taught me the Chapin method [of editing]: 'Nuts and bolts! Nuts and bolts! Get rid of the shit!'" Craven afterwards became the firm's assistant manager, and broke into film editing with You've Got to Walk It Like You Talk It or You'll Lose That Beat (1971).

== Career ==
Craven had a letter published in the July 19, 1968, edition of Life praising the periodical's coverage of contemporary rock music and offbeat performers such as Frank Zappa.

For several years, Craven worked in the pornographic film industry, which was booming at the time. He has a crew credit on the porn classic Deep Throat (1972), and served as assistant director and editor for a porn film directed by Peter Locke, It Happened in Hollywood (1973). He also edited Locke's 1975 sex comedy Kitty Can't Help It, (aka The Carhops).

After earning a master's degree in philosophy and writing from Johns Hopkins University, Craven briefly taught English and humanities at Westminster College and Clarkson College of Technology before deciding to pursue filmmaking. In an interview, he recalled that the transition from academia to cinema came from "a deep need to express the darker side of the human experience through art" and his fascination with the power of film to provoke emotion and moral reflection. Craven stated that his early years were marked by both aesthetic experimentation and a search for "a personal vision based on the shocks and fears that define our modern lives."

Craven's first feature film as director was The Last House on the Left, released in 1972. Craven expected the film to be shown at only a few theaters, which according to him "gave me a freedom to be outrageous." Ultimately the movie was screened much more widely than he assumed, leaving him temporarily ostracized due to the content. Craven returned briefly to pornography, directing the 1975 porn film The Fireworks Woman under the pseudonym "Abe Snake." However, as one book on Craven put it, "the film presented many of Craven's nascent trademarks, including 'rubber reality' (dreams and hallucinations), the breakdown of the traditional family values via incest and the depiction of Christian religion as a force of oppression that asphyxiates the capacity of humans to be happy."

After the negative experience of Last House, Craven attempted to move out of horror with his partner Sean S. Cunningham, but they were unable to secure financial backing. On the advice of a friend, he wrote the desert-set horror The Hills Have Eyes (1977), which cemented his reputation in the genre.

In 1984, Craven achieved mainstream success with A Nightmare on Elm Street, which launched the career of Johnny Depp. While directing Deadly Friend in 1986, Craven was introduced by producer Bob Sherman to Marianne Maddalena, who began working as his assistant. Their professional partnership solidified during the grueling and dangerous shoot of The Serpent and the Rainbow (1988) in Haiti. Craven gave Maddalena her first producer credit on Shocker (1989), later stating that the film marked a milestone for his creative independence and the birth of a lifelong bond:

This picture actually meant a lot to me because it was the first time I had sort of autonomy... and it was also the sort of the introduction of the partnership between myself and Marianne Maddalena, which has lasted now for I think 14 or 15 years and has created an environment for me making films that has been extremely beneficial and also a great friendship.

— Wes Craven, Shocker DVD Commentary Track (2001)

Throughout the early 1990s, the two collaborated on The People Under the Stairs (1991), the meta-horror Wes Craven's New Nightmare (1994) and Vampire In Brooklyn. For New Nightmare, Craven credited Maddalena as a stabilizing presence during a production that earned an Independent Spirit Award nomination for Best Feature. In 1996, following the massive success of Scream—during which Maddalena famously discovered the iconic Ghostface mask while location scouting—the pair formalized their collaboration by founding Craven/Maddalena Films.

The company allowed Craven to pursue projects across genres while maintaining a focus on character-driven stories and complex female protagonists. This expansion led to the drama Music of the Heart (1999), which earned two Academy Award nominations. Under their banner, they produced hits including Scream 2 (1997), Scream 3 (2000), Red Eye (2005), and the remakes of his early works, The Hills Have Eyes (2006) and The Last House on the Left (2009). Their personal friendship and mutual trust remained the cornerstone of the company until Craven died in 2015, with their final collaboration being Scream 4 (2011).

In 2010, Craven took an unusual step by branching out from his longtime creative circle—including producer Marianne Maddalena, assistant director Nick Mastandrea, production designer Bruce Miller, editor Patrick Lussier, post-production supervisor Tina Anderson, script supervisor Sheila Waldron, and director of photography Peter Deming—to work with his new wife, Iya Labunka, who produced My Soul to Take. Craven and Labunka reportedly felt it was important to do something creatively new with a fresh team, free from the opinions and habits carried over from his past collaborations. The project, which Craven wrote and directed, was intended as a return to psychological horror but was met with overwhelmingly negative reviews and disappointing box office results—grossing only $21 million worldwide against a reported $25 million budget. Critics noted that the film lacked the sharpness and creative cohesion that had characterized Craven's previous team, with some suggesting that the shift to a new production environment under Labunka contributed to the film's poor reception.

Beyond film, Craven designed the Halloween 2008 logo for Google and directed episodes of the 1985 reboot of The Twilight Zone. He also created Coming of Rage, a five-issue comic book series, with Steve Niles in 2014.

== Filmmaking ==
=== Influences ===
Craven has cited filmmakers Ingmar Bergman, Luis Buñuel, Alfred Hitchcock, Federico Fellini, Jean Cocteau, and Francois Truffaut as among his major influences. Craven's first film, The Last House on the Left, was conceived as a remake of Bergman's The Virgin Spring (1960). The goat in the dream sequence at the beginning of A Nightmare on Elm Street was included by Craven as a homage to Buñuel.

=== Style and themes ===
Ideas that come out of families which are fractured or disturbed in some way are the most profoundly terrifying things to me. And I've always felt that I was on solid ground when I was making movies about families. The first real terrors happen to us in the first five years of our lives and that's where we are—in the middle of our family. Quite often, for children, the most terrifying things are adults, and unfortunately often it's the parents themselves that are the most frightening.

— Craven on the theme of family in his works

Craven's works tend to explore the breakdown of family structures, the nature of dreams and reality, and often feature black humor and satirical elements. Ostensibly civilized families succumb to and exercise violence in The Last House on the Left and The Hills Have Eyes. A Nightmare on Elm Street, Shocker, and the Scream films explore the process of confronting family trauma.

Several of Craven's films are characterized by abusive familial relationships such as The Hills Have Eyes, A Nightmare on Elm Street, The People Under the Stairs, and others. Families in denial are a common thread throughout his movies, an idea Craven openly discussed:

The family is the best microcosm to work with… It's very much where most of our strong emotions or gut feelings come from… I grew up in a white working class family that was very religious. There was an enormous amount of secrecy in the general commerce of our getting along... If there was an argument, it was immediately denied. If there was a feeling, it was repressed… I began to see that as a nation we were doing the same things.

The blurring of the barrier between dreams and reality, sometimes called "rubber-reality", is a staple of Craven's style. A Nightmare on Elm Street, for example, dealt with the consequences of dreams in real life. The Serpent and the Rainbow and Shocker portray protagonists who cannot distinguish between nightmarish visions and reality. Following New Nightmare, Craven increasingly introduced metafictional elements in his films. New Nightmare has actress Heather Langenkamp play herself as she's haunted by the villain of the film in which she once starred. At one point in the film, the audience sees on Craven's word processor a script he's written, which includes the conversation he just had with Langenkamp—as if the script were being written as the action unfolds.

In Scream, the characters frequently reference horror films similar to their situations and at one point Billy Loomis tells his girlfriend that life is just a big movie. This concept was emphasized in the sequels as copycat stalkers re-enact the events of a new film about the Woodsboro killings (Woodsboro being the fictional town where Scream is set) occurring in Scream.

The first scholarly collection of work dedicated to Craven was published by Edinburgh University Press in July 2023.

=== Collaborators ===
Marianne Maddalena served as a producer on twelve of Craven's films. After working on Wes Craven's New Nightmare, Patrick Lussier became an editor on all of his features up to Red Eye. Craven tended to employ cinematographers Peter Deming, Mark Irwin and Jacques Haitkin on his films. With the exception of Music of the Heart, composer Marco Beltrami worked on all of Craven's films from Scream to Scream 4. Although he tended to write his own films, Craven worked with screenwriter Kevin Williamson regularly after Scream. Craven often used a number of the same actors on his projects including Neve Campbell, Courteney Cox, David Arquette, Robert Englund, Michael Berryman, Heather Langenkamp, Angela Bassett and David Hess.

== Personal life ==
Raised a strict Baptist, Craven was a 1963 graduate of Wheaton College, where he majored in English and psychology and was writer and editor for Kodon (the school's literary magazine). He obtained master's degrees in philosophy and writing from Johns Hopkins.

Craven was married three times. Craven's first marriage, to Bonnie Broecker, produced two children: Jonathan Craven (born 1965) and Jessica Craven (born 1968). Jonathan is a writer and director. Jessica was a singer-songwriter in the group the Chapin Sisters. The marriage ended in 1970.

In 1984, Craven married a woman who became known professionally as actress Mimi Craven. The two later divorced, with Wes Craven stating in interviews that the marriage dissolved after he discovered it "was no longer anything but a sham." In 2004, Craven married Iya Labunka; she frequently worked as a producer on Craven's films.

Craven was a birder. In 2010, he joined Audubon California's board of directors. He has a small library named after him located at the Audubon Center at Debs Park in Los Angeles. His favorite films included Night of the Living Dead (1968), The Virgin Spring (1960) and Red River (1948).

== Death ==
Craven died of a brain tumor at his home in Los Angeles on August 30, 2015, aged 76. Many actors and fellow directors paid tribute to him, including David Arquette, Adrienne Barbeau, Angela Bassett, Bruce Campbell, Heather Langenkamp, Neve Campbell, John Carpenter, Courteney Cox, Joe Dante, Johnny Depp, Robert Englund, Sarah Michelle Gellar, Lloyd Kaufman, Jamie Kennedy, Rose McGowan, Kristy Swanson, Edgar Wright, and Amanda Wyss. The tenth episode of the horror television series Scream and the fifth film in the franchise (2022) were dedicated in his memory.

Craven was buried at the Lambert's Cove Cemetery in the town of West Tisbury on the island of Martha's Vineyard in Massachusetts.

== Filmography ==
Directed features
Year	Title	Distributor
1972	The Last House on the Left	Hallmark Releasing / American International Pictures
1975	The Fireworks Woman (Note: Credited as Abe Snake)	Lobster Enterprises / The Fireworks Company
1977	The Hills Have Eyes	Vanguard
1981	Deadly Blessing	United Artists
1982	Swamp Thing	Embassy Pictures
1984	A Nightmare on Elm Street	New Line Cinema
1985	The Hills Have Eyes Part II	Castle Hill Productions
1986	Deadly Friend	Warner Bros.
1988	The Serpent and the Rainbow	Universal Pictures
1989	Shocker	Universal Pictures
1991	The People Under the Stairs	Universal Pictures
1994	Wes Craven's New Nightmare	New Line Cinema
1995	Vampire in Brooklyn	Paramount Pictures
1996	Scream	Dimension Films
1997	Scream 2	Dimension Films
1999	Music of the Heart	Miramax Films
2000	Scream 3	Dimension Films
2005	Cursed	Dimension Films
2005	Red Eye	DreamWorks Pictures
2010	My Soul to Take	Relativity Media
2011	Scream 4	Dimension Films

TV Movies
Year	Title	Network
1978	Stranger in Our House (Note: also known as Summer of Fear)	NBC
1984	Invitation to Hell	ABC
1985	Wes Craven's Chiller	CBS
1990	Night Visions	NBC

== Bibliography ==
- Wes Craven (November 1, 1999). Fountain Society. Thorndike Press. ISBN 978-0-7862-2270-4.
- Wes Craven; Steve Niles (October 25, 2014). COMING OF RAGE #1. Liquid Comics. ISBN 978-1-62665-913-1.

== Awards and nominations ==
Throughout his career, Craven was nominated for and won numerous awards, including multiple Saturn Awards and several film festival honors.

In 1977, Craven won the critics award at the Sitges Film Festival for his horror film The Hills Have Eyes. In 1997, the Gérardmer Film Festival granted him the Grand Prize for the slasher film Scream. In 2012, the New York City Horror Film Festival awarded Craven the Lifetime Achievement Award.

== See also ==
- Wes Craven's unrealized projects
