= Shocker (film) =

1989 film by Wes Craven

- Theatrical release poster
- Directed by: Wes Craven
- Written by: Wes Craven
- Produced by: Bob Engelman; Peter Foster; Barin Kumar; Marianne Maddalena
- Starring: Michael Murphy; Peter Berg; Cami Cooper; Mitch Pileggi
- Cinematography: Jacques Haitkin
- Edited by: Andy Blumenthal
- Music by: William Goldstein
- Production company: Alive Films
- Distributed by: Universal Pictures (North America); Carolco Pictures (International)
- Release date: October 27, 1989
- Running time: 110 minutes
- Country: United States
- Language: English
- Box office: $16.6 million

Shocker (also known as Wes Craven's Shocker) is a 1989 American supernatural slasher film written and directed by Wes Craven, and starring Michael Murphy, Peter Berg, Cami Cooper, and Mitch Pileggi. The film was released by Universal Pictures on October 27, 1989, and grossed $16.6 million.

== Plot ==
A news report shows a victim being pulled away on a stretcher. It is revealed that a serial killer, having murdered over thirty people, is on the loose in a Los Angeles suburb. Horace Pinker, a television repairman, is the culprit. When the investigating detective, Lt. Don Parker, gets too close, Pinker murders Parker's wife, foster daughter, and foster son.

However, his other foster son, a college football star named Jonathan, develops a strange connection to Pinker through his dreams and leads Parker to Pinker's shop. In a shootout in which several officers are killed, Pinker escapes and targets Jonathan's girlfriend Alison in retribution, killing her as a "birthday present" while he is at practice.

Another dream leads Parker and the police to Pinker, whom they apprehend in the act of an attempted murder. Pinker is quickly convicted and sentenced to die in the electric chair.

Prior to his execution, Pinker reveals that Jonathan is his son, and that as a boy, had shot him in the knee while trying to stop the murder of his mother. It is revealed that Pinker has made a deal with the devil. When executed, he does not die, but instead becomes pure electricity, now able to possess others to continue his murderous ways.

He soon possesses Lt. Parker, who uses his strength to fight off Pinker, who escapes into a TV dish. Jonathan's friends, including Rhino, head to the power station to disable the power.

Jonathan, with the aid of Alison's "spirit", devises a scheme to bring Pinker back into the real world and accidentally discovers that Pinker, as with all energy sources, is bound by the laws of the real world; Jonathan uses this limitation to defeat Pinker and traps him inside a television. Alison's voice tells Jonathan to take care of himself, while Jonathan's neighborhood suffers a blackout caused by his friends blowing out the power main, trapping Pinker in the television. Jonathan goes outside amid his neighbors and looks at the sky, agreeing with Alison that the stars are beautiful.

== Cast ==
- Michael Murphy as Lt. Don Parker
- Peter Berg as Jonathan Parker, Don's adopted son
- Camille Cooper as Alison Clemens, Jonathan's girlfriend
- Mitch Pileggi as Horace Pinker, a serial killer
- Sam Scarber as Coach Sidney Cooper
- Richard Brooks as Rhino
- Vincent Guasteferro as Pastori
- Ted Raimi as Pac Man
- Heather Langenkamp as Victim: Langenkamp previously portrayed the heroine Nancy Thompson in Craven's landmark films, A Nightmare on Elm Street (1984) and A Nightmare on Elm Street 3: Dream Warriors (1987). In this film, she makes a brief cameo appearance as Horace Pinker's first victim shown on TV news.
- Timothy Leary as the television evangelist
- Kane Roberts as Road Worker: The guitarist from Alice Cooper's band.
- Wes Craven as Man Neighbor
- Jessica Craven (Wes Craven's daughter) as Counterperson
- Jonathan Craven (Wes Craven's son) as Jogger. Jonathan also worked as the film's visual effects coordinator.
- John Tesh as the TV newscaster
- Michael Matthews as Evil Mouth
- Eugene Chadbourne as Man in Bar

== Release ==
=== Rating ===
According to Craven, the film was severely cut for an "R" rating. It took around thirteen submissions to the Motion Picture Association of America to receive an "R" instead of an "X". Some scenes that were cut included Pinker spitting out fingers that he bit off of a prison guard, a longer and more graphic electrocution of Pinker, and a longer scene of a possessed coach stabbing his own hand. Despite fan interest, an uncut version has never been released.

=== Box office ===
Shocker was released on October 27, 1989, in 1,783 venues. It earned $4,510,990 in its opening weekend, ranking second behind the third weekend of Look Who's Talking. The film ultimately grossed $16.6 million in the United States.

=== Critical response ===
The film received a split vote from Gene Siskel and Roger Ebert on their weekly television show, with Siskel giving it "a marginal thumbs up" but Ebert voting "thumbs down" and explaining "I felt it would have been a better movie if it had played with more rules." Stephen Holden of The New York Times wrote, "If the movie's metaphors are as obvious and as portentous as the heavy metal music that punctuates the action, 'Shocker' at least has the feel of a movie that was fun to make. Just when you think that every trick has been thrown in but the kitchen sink, it goes in too, along with stove and the refrigerator." Variety wrote, "At first glance (or at least for the first 40 minutes) 'Shocker' seems a potential winner, an almost unbearably suspenseful, stylish and blood-drenched ride courtesy of writer-director Craven's flair for action and sick humor. As it continues, however, the camp aspects simply give way to the ridiculous while failing to establish any rules to govern the mayhem. The result is plenty of unintentional laughs that undermine the few legitimate chuckles and most of the remaining action." Michael Wilmington of the Los Angeles Times stated that the film "is crammed with dazzling bursts of macabre technique" but "is so diffusely organized it's almost three separate movies." Johanna Steinmetz of the Chicago Tribune gave the film one-and-a-half stars out of four and wrote, "A gory thrill show for underdeveloped sensibilities, it is sloppily organized and jarringly paced. Its single conceit, that a barrage of television programs has weakened both our values and our grasp of realities, while an excuse for a climax of ingenious special effects, can't sustain an entire movie." Richard Harrington of The Washington Post said, "For the longest time, 'Shocker' is low voltage, just another gathering of slasher cliches. Toward the end, though, it comes to life thanks to an extended special effects package that is only hinted at earlier." Kim Newman wrote in The Monthly Film Bulletin that "all the characters, especially the dumb-hunk hero and his dead but chatty girlfriend, are cardboard, and none of the connective tissue makes any sense. Asked to turn out 'another Nightmare on Elm Street', Craven has sadly resorted to facile self-imitation rather than coming up with something as fiercely original as his biggest hit movie."

In Wes Craven: The Art of Horror, John Kenneth Muir described Shocker as "Craven's response to the Freddy Krueger film series" for Universal. Muir describes several similarities between the series, though he says Shocker is more comedic. Of the film's conclusion, Muir wrote, Shocker's final 20 minutes are a stylistic special effects tour de force and well worth the price of admission." As of October 2023, the film holds a 30% rating on Rotten Tomatoes based on 27 reviews. The site's consensus reads: "With an intriguing enough premise and horror legend Wes Craven on writer-director duty, the real Shocker here is just how lame the end results turned out to be".

Later Wes Craven said: “I’d like to redo Shocker just to get the special effects right because we had a real special effects disaster on the film. The guy who was doing all the visual effects kind of flamed out, had a nervous breakdown because he was attempting more than he could actually do. When he told us towards the end of the movie that not a single one of the special effects was actually working, he was working on a new technique, my son’s job specifically became just to find all the negative. It was all around town in unmarked boxes and under people’s editing [benches]. It was a nightmare itself. We pulled every favor in town to get all those special effects done very quickly, and some of them are pretty sketchy.”

Metacritic scored Shocker 51 out of 100, indicating "mixed or average reviews".

=== Home media ===
The film was released on DVD by Universal Studios in 1999. It was subsequently re-released by the studio in 2007 as a double feature, alongside Craven's The People Under the Stairs. The film's first Blu-ray edition was released by Shout! Factory on September 8, 2015.

== Legacy ==
=== Literature ===
Shocker received a novelization written by Randall Boyll that was published by Berkley Books on September 1, 1990.

=== Inspired Works ===
Horace P. Gauge is a main antagonist in the video game The Suffering released in 2004. His name and fate are a direct reference to the Film.

=== Music ===
The band Horace Pinker is named after the film.

== Soundtrack ==
Wes Craven's Shocker - No More Mr. Nice Guy - The Music

Soundtrack album by Various Artists
- Released: October 4, 1989
- Genres: Heavy metal, hard rock
- Length: 37:44
- Label: SBK Records

Original musical contributions included songs by Alice Cooper (who would later play Freddy Krueger's abusive foster father, Mr. Underwood, in Freddy's Dead: The Final Nightmare) and Megadeth, who covered Alice Cooper's 1973 hit "No More Mr. Nice Guy", among others. The movie's title song was written by Jean Beauvoir and Desmond Child and recorded by The Dudes of Wrath, a supergroup composed of Paul Stanley of Kiss and Desmond Child, both on vocals, Vivian Campbell and Guy Mann-Dude on guitars, Whitesnake's Rudy Sarzo on bass guitar, and Mötley Crüe's Tommy Lee on drums. The band also included backing vocals by Van Halen bassist Michael Anthony and Kane Roberts. The soundtrack was released on Capitol/SBK Records in 1989.

Soundtrack listing
No.	Title	Artist	Length
1.	"Shocker"	The Dudes of Wrath	3:58
2.	"Love Transfusion"	Iggy Pop	4:22
3.	"No More Mr. Nice Guy" (Alice Cooper cover)	Megadeth	3:02
4.	"Sword & Stone"	Bonfire	3:57
5.	"Timeless Love"	Saraya	4:08
6.	"Shockdance"	The Dudes of Wrath	4:31
7.	"Demon Bell (The Ballad of Horace Pinker)"	Dangerous Toys	3:56
8.	"The Awakening"	Voodoo X	6:02
9.	"Different Breed"	Dead On	3:48
10.	"Shocker (Reprise)"	The Dudes of Wrath	2:54
