= Peter Locke (producer) =

American film producer

- Born: October 21, 1943 (age 82)
- Occupations: Producer; director
- Years active: 1971–present
- Spouse(s): Liz Torres (m. 1974; div. 1977) Karen Ellen Williams (m. 1980) (1 child)
- Children: Taylor Locke

Peter Eric Locke (born October 21, 1943) is an American film producer, and co-founder of The Kushner-Locke Company along with his partner Donald Kushner. He produced the 1977 horror film The Hills Have Eyes and directed the 1971 comedy-drama satire film You've Got to Walk It Like You Talk It or You'll Lose That Beat starring Zalman King, Richard Pryor, Allen Garfield and Robert Downey Sr.

Locke's television credits include the series The Stockard Channing Show, Automan, six seasons of 1st & Ten, 860 episodes of Divorce Court, 66 episodes of Sweating Bullets, Contraption, Gun, Cracker, and Harts of the West. Additionally he has produced 38 "Movies of the Week", six miniseries, game shows, animated syndicated shows, and over 50 direct-to-video/DVD titles.

Locke is an agent for Castel Film Studios in Bucharest, Romania.

Peter Locke is the father of musician Taylor Locke, co-founder and lead guitarist of the bands Rooney and Taylor Locke and the Roughs.

Locke married actress/singer Liz Torres in 1974 and briefly managed her; they divorced in 1977. He has been married to Karen Ellen Williams since October 1980.
