= The Hills Have Eyes (1977 film) =

1977 American horror film directed by Wes Craven

- Theatrical release poster
- Directed by: Wes Craven
- Written by: Wes Craven
- Produced by: Peter Locke
- Starring: Susan Lanier; Robert Houston; Martin Speer; Dee Wallace; Russ Grieve; John Steadman; Michael Berryman; Virginia Vincent
- Cinematography: Eric Saarinen
- Edited by: Wes Craven
- Music by: Don Peake
- Production company: Blood Relations Company
- Distributed by: Vanguard
- Release date: July 22, 1977
- Running time: 89 minutes
- Country: United States
- Language: English
- Budget: $350,000–700,000
- Box office: $25 million

The Hills Have Eyes is a 1977 American horror film written, directed, and edited by Wes Craven and starring Susan Lanier, Michael Berryman, and Dee Wallace. The film follows the Carters, a suburban family targeted by a family of cannibal savages after becoming stranded in the Nevada desert.

Following Craven's directorial debut, The Last House on the Left (1972), producer Peter Locke was interested in financing a similar project. Craven based the film's script on the legend of Scottish cannibal Sawney Bean, which Craven viewed as illustrating how supposedly civilized people could become savage. Other influences on the film include John Ford's The Grapes of Wrath (1940) and Tobe Hooper's The Texas Chain Saw Massacre (1974). The Hills Have Eyes was shot in the Mojave Desert. The film's crew was initially unenthusiastic about the project, but became more passionate due to Craven's enthusiasm and came to believe that they were making a special movie.

The Hills Have Eyes earned $25 million at the box office and spawned a franchise. All subsequent films in the series were made with Craven's involvement. The Hills Have Eyes was released on VHS in 1988 and has subsequently been released on DVD and Blu-ray, while Don Peake's score for the film has been released on CD and vinyl. Reviews for the film were mostly positive, with critics praising its tense narrative and humor. Some critics have interpreted the film as containing commentary on morality and American politics, and the film has since become a cult classic.

== Plot ==
The Carter family is traveling on vacation towing a trailer en route to Los Angeles. Parents Bob and Ethel are driving, accompanied by their children Bobby, Brenda, eldest daughter Lynne, Lynne's husband Doug, Lynne and Doug's baby daughter Catherine (Katy), and the family's dogs, Beauty and Beast.

The dogs are on alert, becoming anxious and barking at the hills. Beauty then runs off. Chasing after her, Bobby finds her mutilated body. Frightened, he runs, falls, and knocks himself unconscious.

Bob walks back to Fred's Oasis to get help. As night falls, he finds Fred, who tells him about his son Jupiter. As a child, Jupiter killed the family's livestock and later murdered his sister. Fred attacked Jupiter with a tire iron and left him in the hills to die. However, Jupiter survived and had children with a depraved, alcoholic prostitute known as Mama. Together, they had three sons – Mars, Pluto, and Mercury – and an abused daughter, Ruby. The family led by "Papa Jupiter" survives by cannibalizing travelers and stealing supplies. Papa Jupiter suddenly crashes through a window, kills Fred with a tire iron, takes Bob prisoner, and crucifies him.

Brenda finds Bobby, still shaken up about Beauty, and the two return to the trailer. Bobby does not mention Beauty's death to avoid frightening the rest of the family. Pluto sneaks into the trailer and signals Papa Jupiter to set Bob on fire as a distraction. Brenda stays in the trailer with Katy, while Ethel, Lynne, Doug, and Bobby rush out to save Bob. The Carters eventually extinguish the fire, but Bob dies shortly afterward.

As the Carters extinguish the fire, Pluto and Mars ransack the camper and Pluto rapes Brenda. When Ethel and Lynne return, Mars shoots them both. Pluto abducts Katy and flees with Mars, intending for the family to eat her. Hearing their screams, Doug and Bobby rush back, only to find Lynne dead, Ethel mortally wounded, and Brenda traumatized.

Mars and Pluto return to their home, a cave. Beast pushes Mercury off a hilltop to his death. Mama chains Ruby outside the cave, torments her, and forces her to eat Beauty as punishment for sympathizing with the Carters. The next morning, shortly after Ethel dies, Doug sets out to find Katy, while Papa Jupiter and Pluto set out to kill the remaining family members. Brenda and Bobby ultimately overpower Papa Jupiter with a series of booby traps and fatally shoot him while Pluto is mauled by Beast. With the help of a remorseful Ruby, Doug is able to save Katy and fatally stabs Mars. An alternative ending featured on the DVD and some TV prints has an epilogue where Ruby accompanies Doug, Katy, and Beast as they rejoin Bobby and Brenda. Brenda then extends her hand to Ruby.

== Cast ==
- Martin Speer as Doug Wood
- Susan Lanier as Brenda Carter
- Robert Houston as Bobby Carter
- Brenda Marinoff as Baby Katy Wood
- Virginia Vincent as Ethel Carter
- Dee Wallace as Lynne Wood
- Russ Grieve as "Big" Bob Carter
- Cordy Clark as Mama
- Janus Blythe as Ruby
- Michael Berryman as Pluto
- James Whitworth as Papa Jupiter
- Lance Gordon as Mars
- Peter Locke as Mercury (credited as Arthur King)
- John Steadman as Fred

== Production ==
=== Development ===
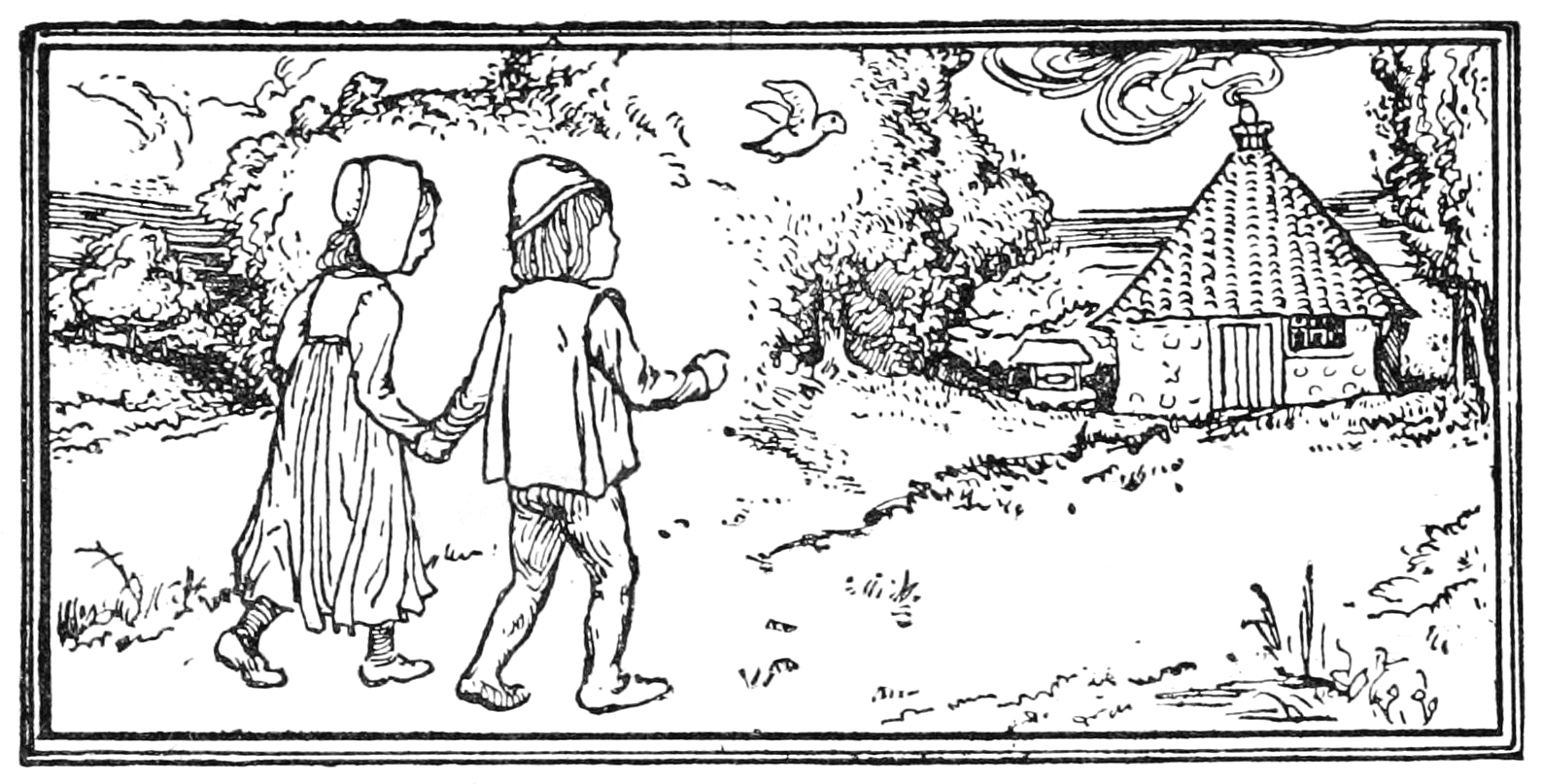
Steve Palopoli notes parallels between "Hansel and Gretel" and The Hills Have Eyes.

Wes Craven desired to make a nonhorror film, following his directorial debut, The Last House on the Left (1972), because he saw the horror genre as constraining. He could not find producers, though, interested in financing a project that did not feature bloody violence. Craven's friend, producer Peter Locke, was interested in financing a horror exploitation film, and Craven decided to write the project due to his monetary issues. Craven considered collaborating with Sean S. Cunningham on a horror children's film based on "Hansel and Gretel", but Locke wanted the film to be more in the vein of The Last House on the Left. According to Steve Palopoli of Metro Silicon Valley, the finished film still features elements of "Hansel and Gretel", specifically its portrayal of people getting lost in the wilderness and setting a trap for their tormentors. Palopoli also noted the witch from "Hansel and Gretel" and the villains from Hills both try to cannibalize children. In writing the project for Locke, Craven decided he "wanted something more sophisticated than Last House on the Left." He added that he "didn't want to feel uncomfortable again about making a statement about human depravity."

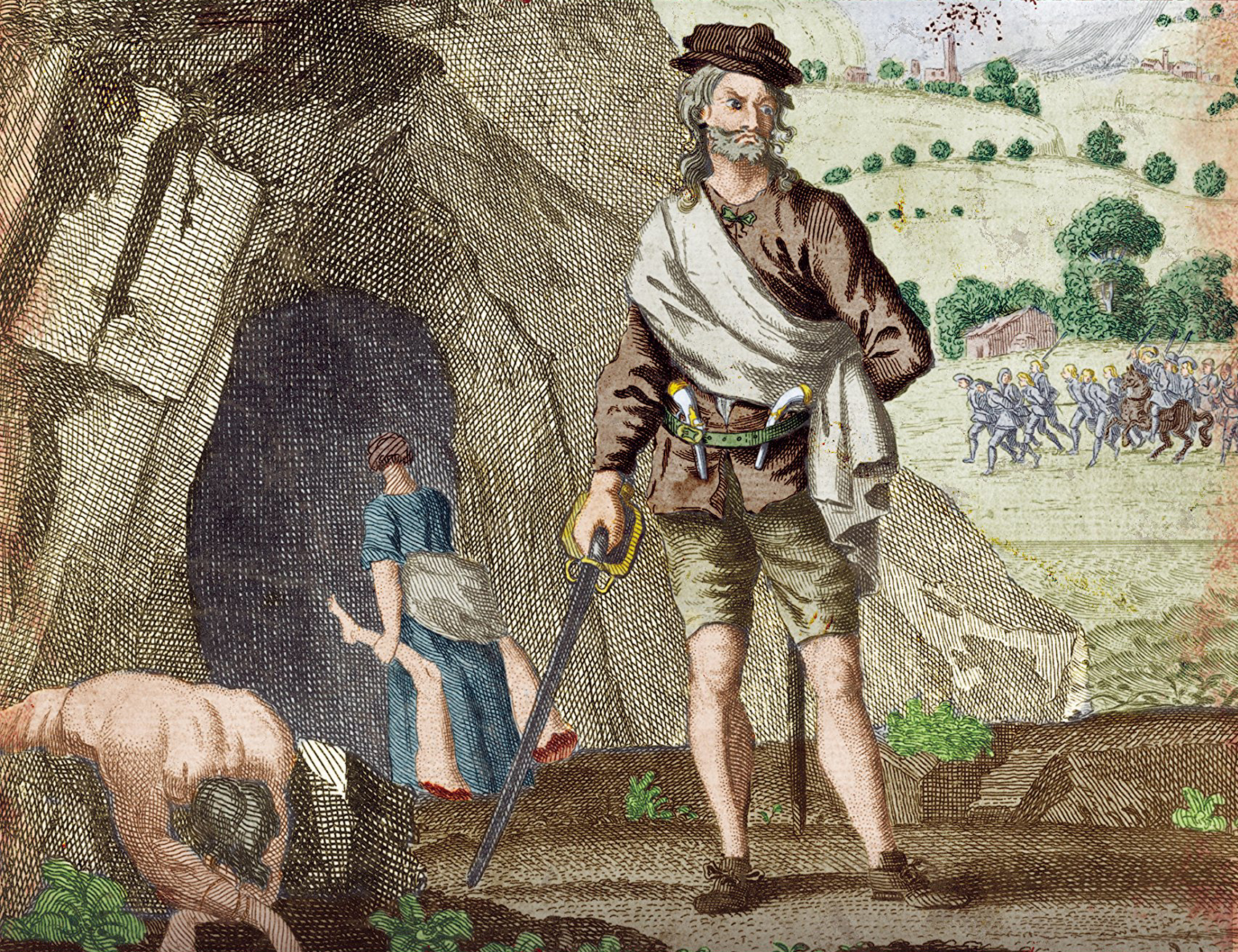
The Hills Have Eyes is based on the legend of Sawney Bean.

Searching for a story to film, Craven began looking up "terrible things" at the New York Public Library. While going through the library's forensics department, Craven learned of the legend of Sawney Bean, the alleged head of a 48-person Scottish clan responsible for the murder and cannibalization of more than 1000 people. What interested Craven in the legend, after Bean's clan was arrested, was how they were tortured, quartered, burned, and hanged. Craven saw this treatment of the Bean clan by supposedly civilized people as paralleling the clan's own savagery. Craven decided to base the film on the legend. Another major inspiration for the project was Tobe Hooper's The Texas Chain Saw Massacre (1974), one of Craven's favorite films. Bloody Disgusting's Zachary Paul says that both films center on a group of vacationers, who are "stranded in the wide-open nowhere and must protect themselves against a tightly knit family of cannibals" and feature an archetypal "gas station of doom". Like The Last House on the Left before it, the film drew influence from the work of European directors such as François Truffaut and Luis Buñuel.

Other inspirations for The Hills Have Eyes were Craven's neighbors and family, on whom the Carters were modeled, the director's nightmares, and John Ford's The Grapes of Wrath (1940). The original script was titled Blood Relations: The Sun Wars and was set in New Jersey during 1984, several years in the future. As Locke's girlfriend, Liz Torres, often performed in Las Vegas during this period, Locke saw a lot of desert landscapes as the film was being written, and suggested that Craven set the film in the desert. Due to budgetary constraints, the film was written to have few roles and be set in few locations. Originally, the film was to end with the surviving members of the family reuniting at the trailer site, signifying that they could move on with their lives. Craven ultimately opted for an ending where Doug stabs Mars as a disgusted Ruby watches, as he liked the role reversal that this ending created. Craven also wanted the two families in the story to be the "mirror images of each other," believing that this would allow him to "explore different sides of the human personality."

=== Casting ===
Michael Berryman, who has 26 different birth defects, won the role of Pluto. He was elated to be cast in a horror film due to his love of The Mummy's Curse (1944) and other black-and-white Universal Classic Monsters films. The character of Ruby needed to be played by an actress who was a fast runner, so all of the actresses who auditioned for the part were required to race each other. Janus Blythe won the part partially because she outran all of the other auditioning actresses. Locke wanted to make a cameo appearance in the film, and was given the role of Mercury, who appears briefly in the film. Locke was credited for the role under the name Arthur King. Gunnar Hansen, who played Leatherface in The Texas Chain Saw Massacre, was offered a part in the film and rejected it, so he could move to Maine and focus on his literary career. He later came to regret not appearing in the film.

=== Filming ===
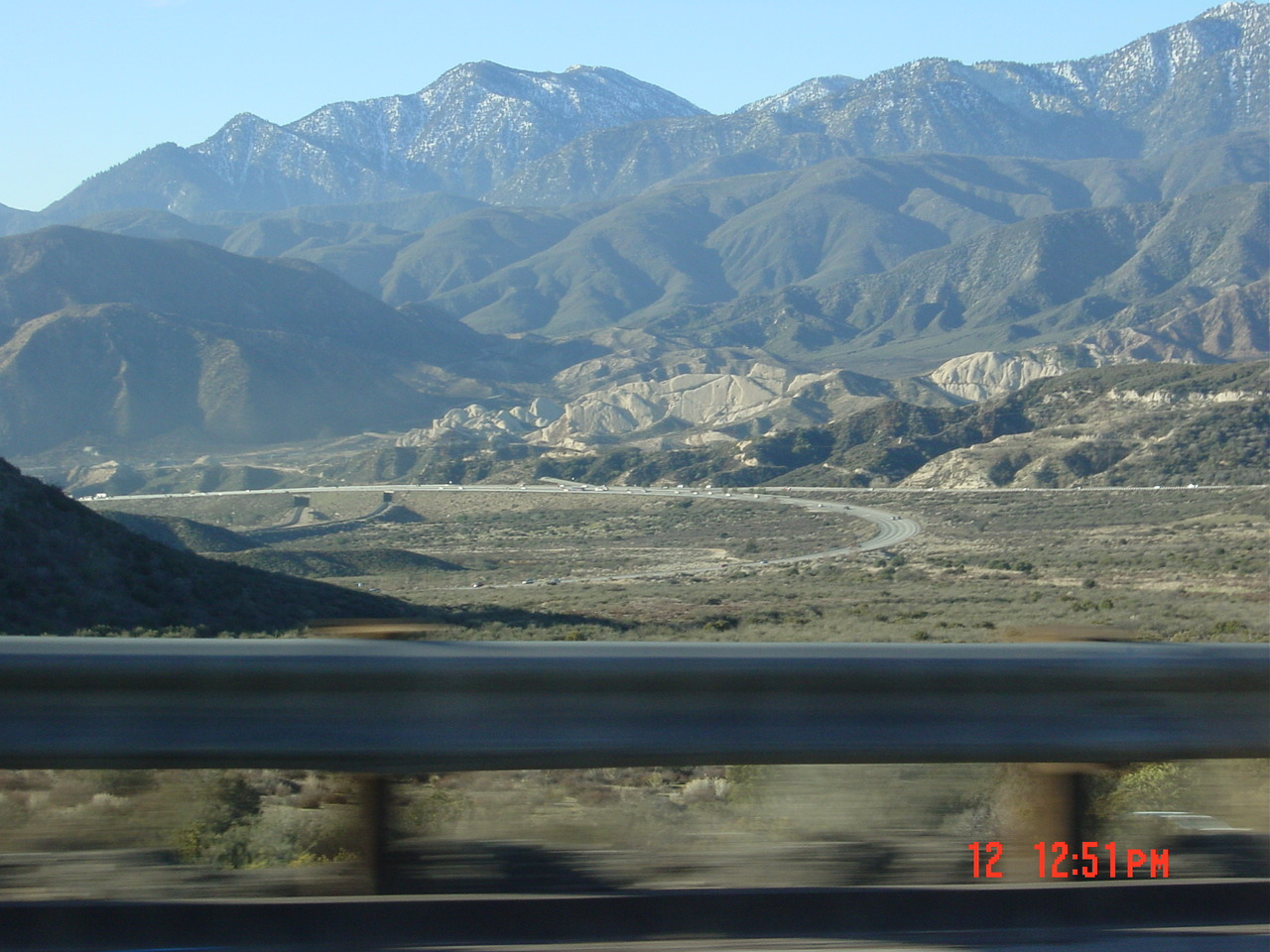
Victorville, California, where the film was shot

Principal photography for The Hills Have Eyes began in October 1976. The film was shot in Victorville, California, in the Mojave Desert using 16 mm film on cameras that were borrowed from a Californian pornographic filmmaker. The film cost between $350,000 and $700,000, around thrice the budget of The Last House on the Left. The film's actors were paid minimum wage, and the film's crew was not unionized. Locke was on the film's set every day of its shoot, making sure that Craven was being productive.

The shoot was unpleasant for the actors, due to daytime temperatures over 120°F (49°C), which dropped to around 30°F (-1°C) at night, and that they played physically taxing roles 12 to 14 hours a day, six days a week. As Berryman lacks sweat glands, the heat was particularly hazardous to his health, and he had to be attended to after the filming of the film's action scenes. Many cast members did their own makeup due to budgetary constraints. Wallace later joked that the dogs that appeared in the film were treated better than its human cast members. Most of the film's crew were veterans of Roger Corman films, and were initially unenthusiastic about The Hills Have Eyes. This changed weeks into production due to Craven's zeal for the project, and because the crew came to believe that the film was "something special".

Robert Burns, the production designer of The Texas Chain Saw Massacre, also served as the production designer for the film. He reused many of the props from The Texas Chain Saw Massacre to decorate the cannibal clan's lair, including animal hides and bones. The sequence where Dee Wallace's character confronts a tarantula was not part of the film's script; it was added to the film after the filmmakers discovered the spider on a road. The tarantula was not harmed during the filming of the sequence. During the sequence where the cannibals eat Big Bob, a leg of lamb stood in for human flesh. This was a relief for the hungry actors. At one point, Craven considered having the character Papa Jupiter eat baby Katy, an idea that most of the cast disliked. Berryman refused to do the scene, and Craven allowed Katy to survive. The carcass of the Carter's family dog, Beauty, was an actual dog carcass that the filmmakers purchased; Craven has refused to explain how exactly the filmmakers obtained it.

=== Post-production ===
The film was initially given an X rating by the MPAA due to its graphic violence, so significant material was removed from Fred's death scene, the sequence where Mars and Pluto attack the trailer, and the last confrontation with Papa Jupiter. Out of about 100 possible titles for the film, The Hills Have Eyes was chosen. It tested well with audiences, though Craven did not like it. Prints of the film were made by Metro-Goldwyn-Mayer.

== Release ==
=== Marketing ===
Locke told the Los Angeles Times that he expected the film's marketing campaign to cost twice or thrice the film's budget. Advertisements for The Hills Have Eyes claimed that a copy of the film had been added to the permanent collection of the New York Museum of Modern Art; in actuality, the copy of the film had been added to the museum's "study" collection rather than its more prestigious permanent collection. One of the museum's curators told the Los Angeles Times that he would prefer that the film's advertisements not mention the museum.

=== Home media ===
The Hills Have Eyes was released on VHS in July 1981. It was released for the first time on DVD by Lionsgate Home Entertainment on September 23, 2003, as a two-disc special edition. On September 29 that same year, it was released by Anchor Bay Entertainment. Anchor Bay would release the film again in 2006. The film made its Blu-ray debut on September 6, 2011, by Image Entertainment, who also released the film on DVD that same day. In 2013, Anchor Bay released the film on Blu-ray as a "Double feature" with Re-Animator (1985) and on DVD as part of a four disc set which also includes Re-Animator, Sleepwalkers (1992), and Darkness Falls (2003). The film had its Canadian release on both DVD and Blu-ray by E1 Entertainment on January 10, 2013. The film was later released on Blu-ray by Arrow Video on October 11, 2016, and again on January 30, 2018.

== Reception ==
=== Box office ===
The film premiered on July 22, 1977, in Tucson, Arizona, where it earned $2 million by October 1977, the same month the film gained a wider release. The Hills Have Eyes ultimately earned $25 million, and was a greater box office success than The Last House on the Left. Craven noted that the film managed to break box office records at some of the individual theaters in which it opened. The film's gross was impeded by the financial success of the Burt Reynolds film Smokey and the Bandit (1977). Locke characterized the film as neither a huge hit nor a box-office bomb, and was pleased with the amount of money it generated.

=== Critical response ===
==== Contemporaneous ====
The staff of Variety called The Hills Have Eyes "a satisfying piece of pulp," adding that "Gratifying aspects [of the film] are Craven's businesslike plotting and pacy cutting, and a script which takes more trouble over the stock characters than it needs. There are plenty of laughs, in the dialog and in the story's disarming twists." In his review of Craven's later film Swamp Thing (1982), Roger Ebert of the Chicago Sun-Times criticized the film for being too "decadent" for his taste. Tim Pulleine of The Monthly Film Bulletin stated that the film's story "had promise" but was "never fused into an effective narrative pattern, let alone an allegorical one." Tim Whitehead of The Spectator deemed the film's "predictable" plot an excuse for "scenes of ghastly carnage in the horror vein of The Texas Chainsaw Massacre," opining that Craven "maintains the tension throughout and occasionally manages to relieve the horror with elements of the ridiculous." Whitehead stated that he "simply found [himself] looking away from the endless stabbings, gougings and burnings."

==== Retrospective ====
On the review aggregator website Rotten Tomatoes, The Hills Have Eyes holds a 69% approval rating based on 29 critic reviews, with an average rating of 6.2/10. The consensus reads: "When it's not bludgeoning the viewer with its more off-putting, cruder elements, The Hills Have Eyes wields some clever storytelling and a sly sense of dark humor." On Metacritic, which assigns a normalized rating to reviews, the film has a weighted average score of 64 out of 100, based on 8 critics, indicating "Generally favorable reviews". The film was included in the book 1001 Movies You Must See Before You Die, where Steven Jay Schneider said it "warrants consideration as one of the richest and most perfectly realized films of Craven's career". Fangoria listed the film as one of the thirteen greatest horror films of the 1970s while Film Journal International has cited The Hills Have Eyes as a classic grindhouse feature. The film was nominated for AFI's 100 Years...100 Thrills. TV Guide gave it a three out of four stars rating, saying that it is "exhilarating" to watch the Carters become more savage.

Entertainment Weekly's Owen Gleiberman wrote that the film is more imaginative than horror films made by major studios. For the San Francisco Chronicle, Walter Addiego said that The Hills Have Eyes is the scariest movie he has ever seen, describing it and The Last House on the Left (1972) as "a turning point in horror ... Suddenly, earlier horror—like the Universal classics (Frankenstein, etc.) and Roger Corman's Poe films—seemed like weak tea." Comparing The Hills Have Eyes to The Texas Chain Saw Massacre, Zachary Paul of Bloody Disgusting found the former superior and praised its "overwhelming" tension.

Slant Magazine's Eric Henderson called the film "effective" and praised its cast, particularly Robert Houston, whose performance is "more complex than your average male lead in a horror film." However, Henderson also deemed the film inferior to The Texas Chainsaw Massacre and criticized the sequence where the Carters create booby traps for feeling like Looney Tunes cartoons about Wile E. Coyote and the Road Runner. Dread Central's Jon Condit opined that The Hills Have Eyes is not one of Craven's best films. In Empire, Kim Newman gave the film a three out of five star rating, saying, "Decades on The Hills Have Eyes no longer seems quite as breathlessly swift as it did." A critic for IndieWire dismissed the film as middling.

=== Accolades ===
At the 1977 Sitges Film Festival, The Hills Have Eyes won the Critic's Award.

=== Analysis ===
==== Genre ====
In Men, Women, and Chainsaws, Carol J. Clover characterizes The Hills Have Eyes as a rape and revenge film. Steven Jay Schneider classifies the film as a hybrid horror film, road movie, "siege film" and Western. Christopher Sharrett of Film Quarterly sees the film as more akin to an Anti-Western.

==== Moral themes ====
According to Steven Jay Schneider in Senses of Cinema, the sequence where Big Bob is crucified symbolizes "utter repudiation of" Judeo-Christian ethics. Schneider also views everyone in the film as guilty in some way. Slant Magazine's Ed Gonzales characterized the film as "morally inconsequential," commenting that with the film's ending "Craven seemingly believes he's saying something about our instinctual need to kill for pleasure, but this philosophy doesn't hold water considering the context of [Doug's] situation ... It's a cut-and-dry [sic] case of life-or-death self-defense." In Wes Craven: The Art of Horror, John Kenneth Muir writes that the film is not saying that the Carter family are worse than their enemies, as the cannibal clan commits violent acts more horrific than anything the Carters do, but that the Carters must stoop to the level of barbarians to defeat barbarians. Muir also believes while the actions of Jupiter's family are inexcusable, they are understandable, as they are trying to survive.

==== Political themes ====
Craven has said that the film expresses rage against American culture and the bourgeois. Steven Jay Schneider, a film critic from Senses of Cinema, views the Carters as a bourgeois family, while the film's cannibals, according to him, may represent "any number of oppressed, embattled and downtrodden minority/social/ethnic groups," including the Indigenous peoples of the Americas, African Americans, hillbillies and the Viet Cong. John Kenneth Muir views the Carters as representing the United States, and that while The Hills Have Eyes has and can be interpreted as an allegory about the Vietnam War, this is complicated by the fact that the Carters defeat their enemies, unlike the American forces in Vietnam. Muir instead sees the film as being about the class divide in America, with the Carters symbolizing the wealthy and Papa Jupiter's family representing the poor. He supports this theory by noting that the Carters and the cannibals are both from America.

== Franchise ==
=== Sequel ===
Craven directed a sequel to the film, The Hills Have Eyes Part II, which was released in 1985. Craven made the film to turn The Hills Have Eyes into a series, in the vein of the Halloween and Friday the 13th series. In the late 1980s, Craven considered making a film in the series set in outer space, but it never came to fruition. The unrelated Craven project Mind Ripper (1995) was originally going to be a third The Hills Have Eyes movie, but it was re-written so that it never directly refers to The Hills Have Eyes or Part II. Mind Ripper still has the alternative title The Hills Have Eyes III.

=== Remake series ===
Alexandre Aja directed a remake of The Hills Have Eyes in 2006, which Craven produced. In 2007, Craven and his son Jonathan wrote the sequel to the remake, The Hills Have Eyes 2.

== Cultural impact ==
=== Legacy ===
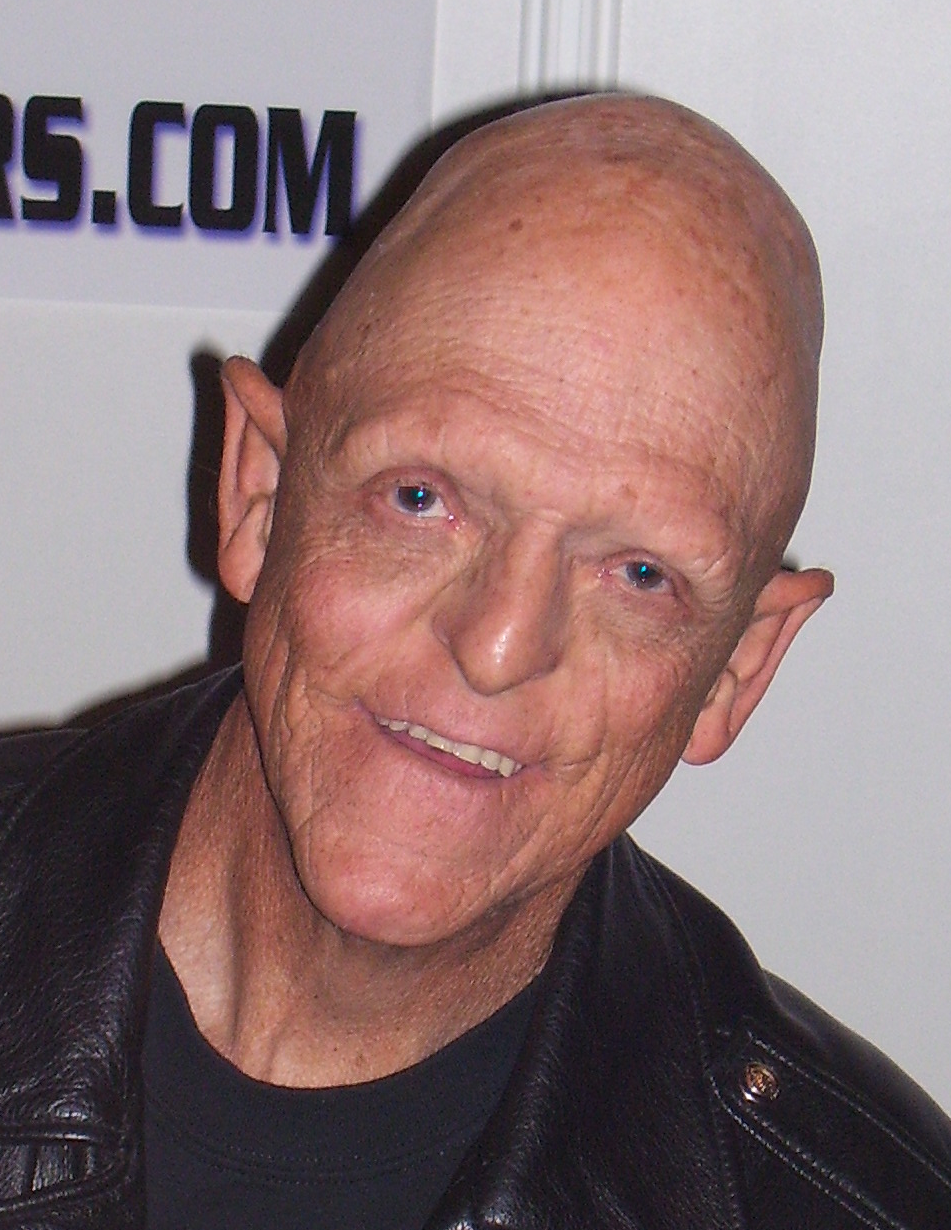
The film made Michael Berryman a horror icon

Multiple critics have deemed The Hills Have Eyes a cult classic, with Zachary Paul of Bloody Disgusting saying "In the 40 years since the film was released, The Hills Have Eyes has amassed quite the large following. It's hard to throw a rock at any decent horror convention without clocking someone involved with the film's production in the head." Both Berryman and his character Pluto have become horror icons due to the film. Dee Wallace became known as a scream queen due to her roles in The Hills Have Eyes, The Howling (1981) and Cujo (1983). John Kenneth Muir writes that The Hills Have Eyes "was seen as a turning point in the horror genre" and inspired humorous, visceral horror films that were accomplished on a technical level, including Halloween (1978), Friday the 13th (1980), and Prom Night (1980).

=== In popular culture ===
While watching The Hills Have Eyes, director Sam Raimi noticed a ripped poster for Steven Spielberg's Jaws (1975) in a scene of the film. He "took it to mean that Wes Craven ... was saying 'Jaws was just pop horror. What I have here is real horror.'" This inspired Raimi to include a ripped The Hills Have Eyes poster in his film The Evil Dead (1981), as a humorous way of telling Craven "No, this is the real horror, pal." Craven reacted to this by having Nancy Thompson fall asleep while watching The Evil Dead in his film A Nightmare on Elm Street (1984). Raimi responded to that by including Freddy Krueger's glove in a scene of Evil Dead II (1987). Later, Craven would have characters in his film Scream (1996) choose to watch a VHS of Halloween (1978) instead of the VHS of The Evil Dead (1981) that they had. Then, in a first-season episode of Raimi's television show Ash vs Evil Dead, Krueger's glove can be glimpsed, while a poster for The Hills Have Eyes can be seen outside a movie theater in an episode of the show's second season after Craven's death in 2015.

"Home," a 1996 episode of The X-Files, is an homage to both The Hills Have Eyes and The Texas Chain Saw Massacre.

The title and lyrics of the Weeknd's song "The Hills" (2015) reference Craven's film.

== Bibliography ==
- Fahy, Thomas (2010), The Philosophy of Horror, United States of America: The University Press of Kentucky, ISBN 978-0-8131-2573-2
- Hogan, David J. (1986), Dark Romance: Sexuality in the Horror Film, Jefferson, North Carolina, and London: McFarland & Company, ISBN 978-0-7864-0474-2
- Hutson, Thommy (2016), Never Sleep Again: The Elm Street Legacy: The Making of Wes Craven's A Nightmare on Elm Street, New York City: Permuted Press, ISBN 978-1-6186864-0-4
- Maddrey, Joseph (2004), Nightmares in Red, White and Blue: The Evolution of the American Horror Film, Jefferson, North Carolina, and London: McFarland & Company, ISBN 978-0-7864-1860-2
- Muir, John Kenneth (1998), Wes Craven: The Art of Horror, Jefferson, North Carolina, and London: McFarland & Company, ISBN 978-0-7864-1923-4
- Paul, Louis (2008), Tales from the Cult Film Trenches: Interviews with 36 Actors from Horror, Science Fiction and Exploitation Cinema, Jefferson, North Carolina, and London: McFarland & Company, ISBN 978-0-7864-2994-3
- Waddell, Terrie (2006), Mis/takes: Archetype, Myth and Identity in Screen Fiction, London and New York: Routledge, ISBN 978-1-58391-720-6
- Walker, Elsie M.; Johnson, David T. (2008), Conversations with Directors: An Anthology of Interviews from Literature/Film Quarterly, Lanham, Maryland, Toronto and Plymouth, UK: The Scarecrow Press, Inc., ISBN 978-0-8108-6122-0
