= The Prophecy (film series) =

- Directed by: Gregory Widen; Greg Spence; Patrick Lussier; Joel Soisson
- Written by: Gregory Widen; Matt Greenberg; Greg Spence; Carl V. Dupré; Joel Soisson; John Sullivan
- Produced by: Bob Weinstein; Harvey Weinstein; Gregory Widen; Robert Little; Matt Greenberg; Joel Soisson; W.K. Border
- Starring: Christopher Walken; Elias Koteas; Virginia Madsen; Viggo Mortensen; Jennifer Beals; Brittany Murphy; Eric Roberts; Vincent Spano; Kari Wuhrer; John Light; Sean Pertwee; Doug Bradley; Jason Scott Lee; Tony Todd
- Distributed by: Buena Vista Home Video; Dimension Films
- Country: United States
- Language: English

The Prophecy is an American fantasy horror-thriller film franchise, which focuses on angels fighting each other to protect the survival of the human race on Earth. Produced by Dimension Films, the series was established in 1995 with the eponymous first installment, The Prophecy, which has since been followed by four direct-to-video sequels. In 2005, its latest sequel The Prophecy: Forsaken was released on DVD instead of VHS.

== Films ==
=== The Prophecy (1995) ===
The first of what became a series of films, The Prophecy was directed and written by Gregory Widen. The Archangel Gabriel (Christopher Walken) searches for an evil soul on Earth, while another angel named Simon (Eric Stoltz) warns Detective Thomas Dagget (Elias Koteas) of coming events, before disappearing. Gabriel's second-in-command, Uziel (Jeff Cadiente), tracks Simon down and attempts to kill him, but Simon kills him instead.

Investigating the disturbance, Thomas goes to Simon's apartment and finds an obituary for a recently deceased Korean War veteran, Colonel Arnold Hawthorne, clipped from a newspaper in Chimney Rock, Arizona. More puzzling, Thomas finds a copy of a theology text that he himself wrote years ago. In Chimney Rock, Simon, who is badly wounded after his fight with Uziel, finds the veteran and removes the soul from the body, and in desperation to hide, he passes it on to a small schoolgirl, Mary (Moriah Shining Dove Snyder) whom he befriends. Mary immediately falls ill, and is cared for by her teacher, Katherine (Virginia Madsen).

Gabriel later finds Simon and kills him by ripping his heart out, after discovering that he does not have the soul. The police detective and the teacher unknowingly become caught in the middle of an angelic war. As the film progresses, Katherine is confronted by Lucifer (Viggo Mortensen), who tells her that since the creation of man, no soul has been allowed to enter Heaven due to the war waged by Gabriel. He knows that if Gabriel wins, Heaven will ultimately devolve into another Hell, and that does not sit well with him because it is "one Hell too many". The next day, Lucifer appears to Thomas, telling him about the nature of Hell, and then advises him to use Gabriel's lack of faith as a weapon against him. When Gabriel arrives, Thomas questions him about his true motives for starting the war. Gabriel reveals that God no longer speaks to him. The angel attempts to disrupt the Native American ritual, but is stopped by Thomas, who runs over Gabriel with a truck, then beats him with a tire iron.

As the ritual continues, Lucifer appears and approaches Gabriel. He tells him the war is based on arrogance, which is evil, making it Lucifer's territory. Lucifer rips out Gabriel's heart while Hawthorne's soul is expelled from Mary and destroyed, seemingly by God. Lucifer consumes Gabriel's heart, and with blood dripping off his mouth, he asks Thomas and Katherine to "come home" with him, but they refuse. The film ends with Thomas commenting on the nature of faith and what it means to be human.

=== The Prophecy II (1998) ===
The Prophecy II was directed by Greg Spence, written by Matt Greenberg and Greg Spence. Gabriel (Christopher Walken) returns from Hell to Earth to prevent the birth of a child, a nephilim, the offspring of one of his kind and one of God's "talking monkeys" (i.e., humans). The coming of this child, said to precede reconciliation between the warring factions in heaven, has been prophesied by a monk, Thomas Daggett (Bruce Abbott), the former detective from the first film in the series. The child's conception takes place when Valerie (Jennifer Beals), a nurse, is seduced by an attractive stranger, the angel Danyael (Russell Wong), whom she hit with her car. She finds a few days later that she is in advanced pregnancy.

Gabriel attempts to find the whereabouts of the child from Daggett, but kills him when he refuses to help. Desperate for assistance after Danyael kills members of his army of angels, Gabriel employs the assistance of a deceased teenage girl, Izzy (Brittany Murphy), who has just committed suicide. The Angel of Death is keeping her alive because despite his powers as an angel, he is completely naive about technology therefore he needs Izzy to use her computer and driving skills to assist him on his search for Valerie.

Gabriel's war against Danyael and the other angels climaxes in a battle in Eden, now an industrial wasteland. Danyael is killed, but Valerie defeats Gabriel by seizing him and jumping from a building, confident that God will protect her as He told her He would (she reveals that Gabriel is unable to hear His voice as he simply does not listen); she is indeed unharmed, but Gabriel is impaled on a spike. As punishment, Gabriel is turned into a human by Archangel Michael (Eric Roberts). Valerie raises the child by herself, accepting the risk that the angels may come for her. The film ends with Gabriel as a derelict; a face in the sky and ominous clouds show that the war in heaven is not over.

=== The Prophecy 3: The Ascent (2000) ===
The Prophecy 3: The Ascent was directed by Patrick Lussier, written by Carl Dupré and Joel Soisson. In the third installment of the series, the Angel Gabriel (Christopher Walken) has taken up residence on Earth and has been watching over the Rosales family for years as a human being. One night, he witnesses the neighbors of the Rosales forming a mob and setting their house on fire with Molotov cocktails. Valerie Rosales perishes in the flames, but Gabriel is able to save her boy, Danyael.

Eighteen years later, Danyael (Dave Buzzotta), as an adult, is a street preacher with a storefront church who tells his flock that God does not care much for the people who tend the Earth. Suddenly, a blind man (Brad Dourif) – who claims to hear the voice of God – shoots Danyael several times in the chest, but several hours after he is pronounced dead, Danyael rises from his slab at the morgue and heads out into the street. It appears that Danyael is a nephilim – born of an Angel and a woman – with the abilities of superhuman agility, regeneration, and can only die if his heart is removed. Furthermore, it is revealed that his destiny is to prevent Pyriel (Scott Cleverdon), the Angel of Genocide, from overthrowing God and destroying all mankind. In addition, Danyael learns from Gabriel that the two previous attempts in his life – the burning of his childhood home which resulted in the death of his mother and the later assassination at the church – were the workings of Pyriel. As Gabriel further explains, the Angel of Genocide has the ability to plague the minds of humans – such as the neighbors of the Rosales family and the blind assassin – with the thoughts of hatred in order for them to accomplish his dirty work.

Maggie (Kayren Butler), his understandably upset girlfriend, is then approached by Zophael (Vincent Spano), a fallen angel who seeks to prevent Danyael from fulfilling his destiny. He manages to convince her that Danyael is the only one in danger, and enlists her help in tracking him down. Meanwhile, Danyael's journey leads him to a Native American reservation where he briefly meets Mary (Moriah 'Shining Dove' Snyder) – a character first introduced as a child in the first film – who informs him that she dreamed of his coming, and that she believes Danyael will be victorious against Pyriel. After parting from Mary, Zophael purposely crashes the vehicle in an attempt to run down Danyael which badly injures Maggie as a result of the crash. Zophael is killed in the ensuing fight, but now Danyael must confront Pyriel while weakened by his wounds from the previous battle.

Danyael heads off to face Pyriel armed with Zophael's weapon – a staff that has an extendable blade that expands out as a six-pronged hook designed to rip out the victim's heart – while Gabriel watches over Maggie. He confronts Pyriel, but the Nephlim is no match for him, although he succeeds in impaling him with the specially designed weapon. Suddenly, when it appears that Pyriel is going to be victorious, God seemingly sends down a lightning bolt, electrocuting the weapon and, through it, Pyriel, as a result, weakening him. Danyael then extends the blade into its prongs form and removes Pyriel's heart, killing him and apparently ending the war in Heaven. He returns to Maggie who is on the verge of death as she lies in the arms of Gabriel. With the war in Heaven apparently over (for the time being), Gabriel has redeemed himself, is once again an Archangel and with his regained divine abilities saves Maggie before ascending.

=== The Prophecy: Uprising (2005) ===
The Prophecy: Uprising was directed by Joel Soisson and written by John Sullivan. The film begins with the story of a woman named Allison (Kari Wührer) who has come into possession of The Lexicon, a mysterious book of prophecies that writes itself. This book contains the additional and still incomplete 23rd chapter of the final book in the Holy Bible, Revelation, also called The Apocalypse. The last chapter depicts the end of the war of angels. One of the angels who fell with Lucifer, Belial (Doug Bradley), is now a demon and wants this book.

While searching for Allison and the book, and to avoid detection, Belial keeps on murdering people and taking their form. Meanwhile, Lucifer (John Light) seeks the help of a cop, Dani Simionescu (Sean Pertwee), who has a dark secret; as a child he reported his parents to secret police, and then they were brought to police headquarters to be tortured in front of him and his baby sister. Afterward, his baby sister gets hurt and then given up for adoption. She is given the name Allison. Lucifer brings the cop to the same house which witnessed inhumane tortures, making it his domain. Allison, with guidance of the voices in her head, reaches the same place, followed by Belial. It is the only place where Belial cannot hurt Allison. It is a place of evil, which makes it Lucifer's area, and he offers Allison and her brother protection. Here, the cop confesses his sins and seeks forgiveness but is rebuked by his sister. It is here that real motives are revealed. Belial, who was loyal to Lucifer, now wants to get some advantage from the war of angels. He is frustrated by the inertness of Lucifer and now wants an aggressive Hell. Lucifer, who had initially opposed God for his love for humans, helps humans to fight Belial. He does not want another Hell, believing that only one Hell is enough for the world. He helps the cop and Allison to kill Belial and then he absorbs Belial's soul. The film concludes at the dawn, when Lucifer tells Allison that for the present the war of angels is over, but will not be for long. Showing her glimpses of her future, he advises her to keep the book safe.

=== The Prophecy: Forsaken (2005) ===
The Prophecy: Forsaken was directed by Joel Soisson and written by John Sullivan. Following the events of the previous film, Allison (Kari Wührer) is still protecting the Lexicon, an ancient book that will foretell the name of the coming Antichrist, from renegade angels called Thrones who are led by a sinister character called Stark (Tony Todd). Allison is assisted by Dylan (Jason Scott Lee), a contract killer, who was actually hired to kill Allison but after an epiphany decides to help her instead. Allison also seeks help from Lucifer (John Light) who explains that the Lexicon is going to name the anti-Christ in a matter of hours.

The angels later capture Allison and bring her before Stark; he tells her that he is against the whole messy idea of Armageddon and if they can find the name of the anti-Christ, they would kill the child before the apocalypse happens, as a result saving humanity. Allison denies Stark's offer because neither man or angel should go against God's will and argues that is why she is still alive. Enraged, Stark threatens to kill Allison if he has to, but he decides on letting her leave for now. As Allison leaves, Lucifer appears in the park to inform her about the motives of why Stark and other seraphim want to prevent Armageddon. If Armageddon happens, billion of human beings will die causing Heaven as well as Hell to be flooded with human souls. Envious of God's attention, Stark and the others want to prevent Armageddon so that Heaven will not be overpopulated with human souls as well as prove to God that they – the seraphim – are his victors. Lucifer, on the other hand, is keen on the idea of Armageddon because every corrupt soul that is rejected by God will appear at his doorstep in the billions and join his army.

Allison then runs to the abandoned house that contains the Lexicon and climbs the stairs to the top of the building as Stark is in hot pursuit. The Lexicon produces the name of the anti-Christ — Mykael Paun, and he shall bear four distinct marks on his face. Stark corners her on the roof and claims that the child is there in Bucharest. As Stark tries to reason with Allison, he asks her if she wonders why she was chosen and how she has been able to keep the Lexicon from creatures more powerful than herself. He states that she is a "nephalim" – a half-breed between an angel named "Simon" (a character from the first film) and a human – bred specifically to protect the Lexicon, therefore Allison is nothing more than a tool. Dylan, who is feeling the effects of death more than ever, staggers to the roof and is caught between them. Allison pleads with him to accept God's will on faith, but Stark is telling him to complete his task so he can be done with this miserable existence. Dylan is torn; he goes back and forth between them before shooting Allison repeatedly in the chest. Nevertheless, there was method in his madness; as Allison falls over the precipice, the pages of the Lexicon scatter everywhere. The winds carry them throughout the streets of Bucharest, and Allison survives due to her "nephalim" healing powers, while Stark has no way of tracking all the pages of the Lexicon. The final page, the one Stark was looking for, falls at the feet of a young boy named Mykael Paun.

== Production ==
Christopher Walken was robbed at the airport in Venice and his The Prophecy II script, glasses, keys, driver's license, and $100 were stolen. All items were later found (including the script) except for the money.

The Prophecy 3: The Ascent marked the directorial debut of Patrick Lussier, who has often worked as an editor for horror director Wes Craven.

The Prophecy: Uprising and The Prophecy: Forsaken were filmed simultaneously. Furthermore, both films are without Christopher Walken and Steve Hytner as the Archangel Gabriel and the coroner Joseph, respectively.

== Home media ==
Each of The Prophecy's sequels were released direct-to-video, skipping theatrical release.

== Cast and characters ==
* A dark grey cell indicates the character was not in the film.

Angel
| Characters | Film | | | | |
| Characters | The Prophecy (1995) | The Prophecy II (1998) | The Prophecy 3: The Ascent (2000) | The Prophecy: Uprising (2005) | The Prophecy: Forsaken (2005) |
|---|---|---|---|---|---|
| Danyael (Sr.) | | Russell Wong | | | |
| Gabriel (Archangel) | Christopher Walken | | | | |
| Lucifer (aka Satan) | Viggo Mortensen | Guri Weinberg (The Shape/Voice) | | John Light (as John Riegert/Satan) | |
| Michael (Archangel) | | Eric Roberts | | | |
| Pyriel (Angel of Genocide) | | | Scott Cleverdon | | |
| Rafayel (Archangel) | | William Prael | | | |
| Samayel (Archangel) | | Glenn Danzig | | | |
| Simon (Archangel) | Eric Stoltz | | | Jason London (voice) | |
| Stark | | | | | Tony Todd |
| Uziel | Jeff Cadiente | | | | |
| Zophael (Archangel) | | | Vincent Spano | | |

Human
| Characters | Film | | | | |
| Characters | The Prophecy (1995) | The Prophecy II (1998) | The Prophecy 3: The Ascent (2000) | The Prophecy: Uprising (2005) | The Prophecy: Forsaken (2005) |
|---|---|---|---|---|---|
| Allison | | | | Kari Wuhrer & Smaranda Popescu (as young Allison) | |
| Danyael (Jr.) | | Michael Raimi | Dave Buzzotta & Drew Swaine (as young Danyael) | | |
| Dylan | | | | | Jason Scott Lee |
| Dani Simionescu | | | | Sean Pertwee | |
| Izzy | | Brittany Murphy | | | |
| Jerry | Adam Goldberg | | | | |
| Joseph | Steve Hytner | | | "Joseph_1995" (internet chat) | |
| Katherine | Virginia Madsen | | | | |
| Laurel | | | | Doug Bradley | |
| Madge (waitress at dinner) | Sandra Ellis Lafferty | | Sandra Ellis Lafferty | | |
| Mary | Moriah 'Shining Dove' Snyder | | Moriah 'Shining Dove' Snyder | | |
| Thomas Daggett | Elias Koteas | Bruce Abbott | | | |
| Valerie Rosales | | Jennifer Beals | Uncredited actress | | |
