= The Prophecy 3: The Ascent =

- Film poster
- Directed by: Patrick Lussier
- Written by: Joel Soisson; Carl Dupré
- Based on: Characters by Gregory Widen
- Produced by: Joel Soisson; W.K. Border
- Starring: Christopher Walken; Vincent Spano; Kayren Ann Butler; Brad Dourif
- Cinematography: Nathan Hope
- Edited by: Peter Devaney Flanagan
- Music by: Steve Boeddeker; David C. Williams (The Prophecy themes)
- Distributed by: Dimension Films
- Release date: March 14, 2000
- Running time: 84 minutes
- Country: United States
- Language: English

The Prophecy 3: The Ascent is a 2000 American horror film and the third installment in The Prophecy series. Christopher Walken and Steve Hytner reprise their roles as the Archangel Gabriel and the coroner Joseph, respectively. As the war in Heaven and on Earth rages on, Pyriel (Scott Cleverdon), the Angel of Genocide, arises with the intention of destroying all humankind; the only one who can stop him is Danyael (Dave Buzzotta), a Nephilim born of an angel and a human woman, but is unaware of his purpose until he learns it from Gabriel (who became a human at the end of The Prophecy II). Gabriel acts as Danyael's guardian while Zophael (Vincent Spano) seeks out Danyael. The fate of mankind hangs in the balance as Danyael sets out to confront Pyriel and fulfill his destiny.

== Plot ==
Danyael Rosales is a street preacher who thinks God does not care about anyone because of the death of his parents, Valerie Rosales, and the angel Danyael from the previous film. He is then forced to face his destiny. As a Nephilim, he has some of the angels' abilities, such as regeneration, and can only be killed if his heart is removed. One night, a blind assassin shoots Danyael as he preaches before a crowd, but the assassin is driven off before he can take out Danyael's heart. The assassin is then compelled to commit suicide by an unseen force. The angel Zophael pursues Danyael himself, armed with a blade that can be turned into a three-pronged hook. Danyael is protected by Gabriel, a now-human fallen angel who killed Danyael's father and performed many misdeeds. After being defeated by Danyael's mother, Gabriel was turned into a human as punishment. Having spent years as a human, he now realizes how wrong he was in the past.

Zophael convinces Danyael's girlfriend, Maggie, to work with him to stop Danyael. When she becomes suspicious of his motives, Maggie shoots Zophael. It has little effect on the angel, who finally tells her what he is. Frightened and confused, Maggie agrees to help him, and the two catch up to Danyael on a Native American reservation. He is on his way to confront Pyriel, another angel who wants to overthrow God. Danyael briefly meets Mary, a Native American woman (first introduced as a child in the first film). Mary informs Danyael that she dreamed of his coming and that she believes he will be victorious against Pyriel. Danyael is attacked by Zophael, who has purposefully crashed Maggie's truck and badly injured her. He then faces off against Zophael in battle and seemingly defeats him by impaling his chest with a motorcycle tailpipe, but the angel gets back up and uses his weapon to impale Danyael from behind. Before Zophael can remove Danyael's heart, Maggie empties her gun into him. Danyael takes his chance and removes Zophael's heart through the hole he created earlier, finally killing him.

Danyael heads off to face Pyriel, armed with Zophael's weapon, while Gabriel watches over Maggie. Danyael is no match for Pyriel, but he does succeed in impaling him with Zophael's weapon. Danyael is about to lose when God sends down a lightning bolt, electrocuting the weapon and, through it, Pyriel. Danyael extends the blade into its prong form and removes Pyriel's heart with it, killing him and apparently ending the war in Heaven. He returns to Gabriel, who, through showing compassion and care to a human and helping to stop the war, has regained his angelic status. Redeemed and with his powers restored, he heals Maggie's wounds before returning to Heaven.

== Cast ==
- Christopher Walken as Gabriel
- Vincent Spano as Zophael
- Dave Buzzotta as Danyael
- Kayren Butler as Maggie
- Steve Hytner as Joseph
- Brad Dourif as Zealot
- Scott Cleverdon as Pyriel
- Jack McGee as Detective
- Sandra Ellis Lafferty as Madge
- Mark Prince Edwards as Donut Guy
- Tyrone Tann as Kyle
- Moriah 'Shining Dove' Snyder as Mary
- J.D. Rosen as Tail Man
- William Stanford Davis as Portly Coroner
- Drew Swaine as Young Danyael
- Anthony Rosselli as Desk Sergeant
- Hi Border as Toothless Woman
- Tom Kane as Angel (voice)

== Release ==
The Prophecy 3: The Ascent was released on home video on March 14, 2000.

== Reception ==
Rotten Tomatoes, a review aggregator, reports that 17% of six surveyed critics gave the film a positive review; the average rating is 2.9/10. Robert Pardi of TV Guide rated it 1 out of 4 stars and wrote that Walken is not enough to save the film from its absurdities. Mike D'Angelo of Entertainment Weekly rated it D− and said the film series gets progressively worse with each sequel. Whitney Seibold of CraveOnline called it "a middling straight-to-video sequel" that has Walken to add a touch of class. Randy Myers wrote in the Times Leader that "ninety percent of the time, made-for-tape sequels aren't worth spit [...] But The Prophecy has proven to be the different; the two movies are actually better than the original". Myers commented on the plot stating that "not for a minute can you take this seriously, and if you do, heaven help you. Fortunately the brains behind this series don't play it straight, inserting some very witty lines (usually from Walken) that make this Prophecy a fitting wrap up of the series".

From retrospective reviews, Gordon Sullivan of DVD Verdict wrote that "The Ascent is not great filmmaking, but it aims squarely for genre conventions and hits its mark".

== See also ==
- List of films about angels
