= The Prophecy =

- Theatrical release poster
- Directed by: Gregory Widen
- Written by: Gregory Widen
- Produced by: Joel Soisson
- Starring: Christopher Walken; Elias Koteas; Virginia Madsen; Eric Stoltz; Amanda Plummer; Viggo Mortensen
- Cinematography: Richard Clabaugh; Bruce Douglas Johnson
- Edited by: Sonny Baskin
- Music by: David C. Williams
- Production companies: Dimension Films; First Look Pictures
- Distributed by: Miramax Films
- Release date: September 1, 1995
- Running time: 97 minutes
- Country: United States
- Language: English
- Box office: $16.1 million

The Prophecy is a 1995 American fantasy thriller horror film starring Christopher Walken, Elias Koteas, Virginia Madsen, Eric Stoltz, and Viggo Mortensen. It was written and directed by Gregory Widen in his feature directorial debut, and is the first film of The Prophecy series. The film tells the story of the Archangel Gabriel (Walken) and his search for an evil soul on Earth, and a police detective (Koteas) who unknowingly becomes caught in the middle of an angelic civil war. It was followed by four sequels.

== Plot ==
Thomas Dagget, a Catholic seminary student, loses his faith after seeing visions of an angelic war. Years later, Thomas is a detective with the LAPD. Two angels fall to Earth; Simon and Uziel, a lieutenant of the Archangel Gabriel. Simon briefly enters Thomas' home and warns him of coming events. Uziel is killed in an altercation with Simon. Investigating the disturbance, Thomas finds in Simon's apartment the obituary of recently deceased Korean War veteran Colonel Arnold Hawthorne, who was under investigation for war crimes, and a thesis about angels, written by Thomas in seminary. Simon finds Hawthorne awaiting burial in Chimney Rock, Arizona, and sucks his soul out of his body.

The medical examiner informs Thomas that Uziel's body has no eyes, hermaphroditism, and the blood chemistry of an aborted fetus. His personal effects include an ancient Bible, with an expanded Book of Revelation that describes a second war in Heaven and a prophecy that a "dark soul" will be found on Earth and used as a weapon.

Gabriel arrives on Earth. Needing a human helper, Gabriel catches a disappointed Jerry, a suicide, in the moment of his death. Jerry retrieves Uziel's belongings from the police station while Gabriel destroys Uziel's body in the morgue. Finding Hawthorne's obituary, Gabriel and Jerry head for Chimney Rock. Before Gabriel arrives at the local reservation school, Simon hides Hawthorne's soul in Mary, a young Native American girl. She immediately falls ill and is cared for by her teacher, Katherine.

After finding Uziel's burnt remains in the morgue, Thomas hurries to Chimney Rock. Gabriel confronts Simon regarding Hawthorne's missing soul. Hawthorne's soul will tip the balance in favor of the side that possesses it. A win for the rebellious angels would make Heaven like Hell with Earth in its thrall. Gabriel tortures Simon, but he refuses to reveal the location, so Gabriel kills him. Mary shows signs of possession by Hawthorne, recounting an incident from Hawthorne's harrowing war experiences in first-person perspective. Meanwhile, Thomas examines Simon's remains and questions Katherine. In Hawthorne's home, he finds evidence of war crimes. Thomas visits a church to reflect and is shaken by a verbal confrontation with Gabriel.

At school, Katherine finds Gabriel questioning the children. After he leaves, she rushes to Mary's home and finds Thomas. As Mary's condition worsens, Katherine takes Thomas to an abandoned mine where she had seen Gabriel. They find angelic script and, together, experience a terrible vision of the angelic war. Returning to Mary, they find Gabriel and Jerry. Thomas kills Jerry, while Katherine distracts Gabriel when her wild gunshot misses him and blows up Mary's trailer home. They take Mary to a Native American site to be exorcised. In a hospital, Gabriel recruits a new unwilling assistant, Rachael, just as she dies of a terminal illness.

Lucifer confronts Katherine and tells her that "other angels" have taken up this war against mankind, and since then, no human souls have been able to enter Heaven. He knows of Gabriel’s plan to use Hawthorne's soul to overthrow the obedient angels. He also knows that if Gabriel wins the war under his influence, Heaven will ultimately devolve into another Hell, which Lucifer considers "one Hell too many". Lucifer then appears to Thomas and advises him to use Gabriel's lack of faith against him. When Gabriel arrives and attempts to disrupt the exorcism ritual, Thomas kills Rachael, and he and Katherine fight Gabriel. Gabriel defeats them and moves to kill Katherine.

Lucifer appears, encouraging the Natives to complete the exorcism. Lucifer confronts Gabriel, telling him that his war is based upon arrogance, which is evil, making it Lucifer's territory. Lucifer tells Gabriel he needs to go home and rips out his heart. Simultaneously, Mary expels Hawthorne's soul. The "enemy ghost" begins attacking Thomas and Katherine, but a bright light from Heaven appears and destroys it. Lucifer asks Thomas and Katherine to "come home" with him, but they refuse. Lucifer drags Gabriel to Hell. As morning comes, Thomas comments on the nature of faith and what it means to truly be human.

== Cast ==
- Christopher Walken as Gabriel
- Elias Koteas as Thomas Dagget
- Virginia Madsen as Katherine
- Eric Stoltz as Simon
- Viggo Mortensen as Lucifer
- Amanda Plummer as Rachael
- Moriah Shining Dove Snyder as Mary
- Adam Goldberg as Jerry
- Steve Hytner as Joseph
- J.C. Quinn as Burrows
- Jeff Cadiente as Uziel
- Patrick McAllister as Col. Hawthorne
- Albert Nelson as Grey Horse

== Production ==
Gregory Widen wrote the film, also known as Daemons and God's Army during development, with his interest being in showing a darker side of angels much like how they were portrayed in the Old Testament. With The Prophecy, Widen wanted to analyze the underlying characteristics of angels in contrast to more benevolent depictions where they're in service of mankind and instead look at them as more complicated characters and what motivates their dark deeds like those in the Old Testament. When writing the film's depiction of Gabriel, Widen had written the role with Christopher Walken in mind and Walken ended up being the first one to sign on. During production a lightning storm with 120 mile per hour winds destroyed an Indian village set on a cliff. Shooting on the film was done from late September to early November 1993.

== Release ==
Following several release delays, The Prophecy was given its theatrical release in the United States on September 1, 1995. The film's home media release was March 12, 1996.

== Reception ==
Rotten Tomatoes, a review aggregator, reports that 46% of 24 surveyed critics gave the film a positive review; the average rating is 5.1/10. The critical consensus reads: "The Prophecy has its moments, but any fantasy thriller starring Christopher Walken as a murderous angel should be a good deal more engaging than this". Eric Hansen of Variety called it "daring and unique on the one hand, but hard to swallow on the other". Stephen Holden of The New York Times wrote that the film is bad enough to end the recent proliferation of religious thrillers. David Kronke of the Los Angeles Times wrote: "Though Widen proves himself capable enough behind the camera, his script here is simply too loopy for him to render it in any credible fashion". Mick LaSalle of the San Francisco Chronicle wrote that director Widen made a film with some genuinely creepy moments. Owen Gleiberman of Entertainment Weekly rated it D− and described it as "an occult freakshow so inert it seems to have been pasted together out of stock footage".

It has since gone on to become a cult film.

== Sequels ==
The film spawned four direct-to-video sequels: The Prophecy II (1998), The Ascent (2000), Uprising (2005) and Forsaken (2005).

== Soundtrack ==
The film score by David C. Williams was released by Perseverance Records on August 7, 2006. The song "Breakin' Down" by heavy metal band Skid Row plays over the closing credits. Other pop songs featured include "Angel In Black" by Shawn Amos, "Surf N' Turf" by Dennis Michael Tenney, and "Your Best Friend" by Peter Bear. The film also uses classical pieces associated with Christianity such as Franz Schubert's Ave María and the Gregorian chant Gloria, laus et honor performed by The Choir Of Monks Of Saint-Benoit Du Lac.

== See also ==
- List of films about angels
