= W.K. Border =

American film producer

- Occupation: Film producer
- Notable work: Bill & Ted's Excellent Adventure

W.K. Border (born c. 1962) is an American film producer, active from 1989 to 2007. Border owned Neo Motion Pictures, a post-production studio in Los Angeles.

== Filmography ==
- Bill & Ted's Excellent Adventure (1989)
- Lower Level (1991)
- Maniac Cop III: Badge of Silence (executive, 1992)
- American Yakuza (executive, 1993)
- Blue Tiger (executive, 1994)
- The Prophecy (executive, 1995)
- No Way Back (executive, 1995)
- Back to Back (1996)
- Drive (1997)
- Trekkies (1997)
- The Prophecy II (1998)
- Sweet Jane (1998)
- Suckers (1999)
- Six Day in Roswell (1999)
- Sex, Death & Eyeliner (1999)
- The Prophecy 3: The Ascent (2000)
- Hellraiser: Inferno (2000)
- Dracula 2000 (2000)
- Mimic 3: Sentinel (2003)
- Dracula II: Ascension (2003)
- Dracula III: Legacy (2005)
- American Pie Presents: The Naked Mile (2006)
- American Pie Presents: Beta House (2007)
