= Kari Wuhrer =

American actress (born 1967)

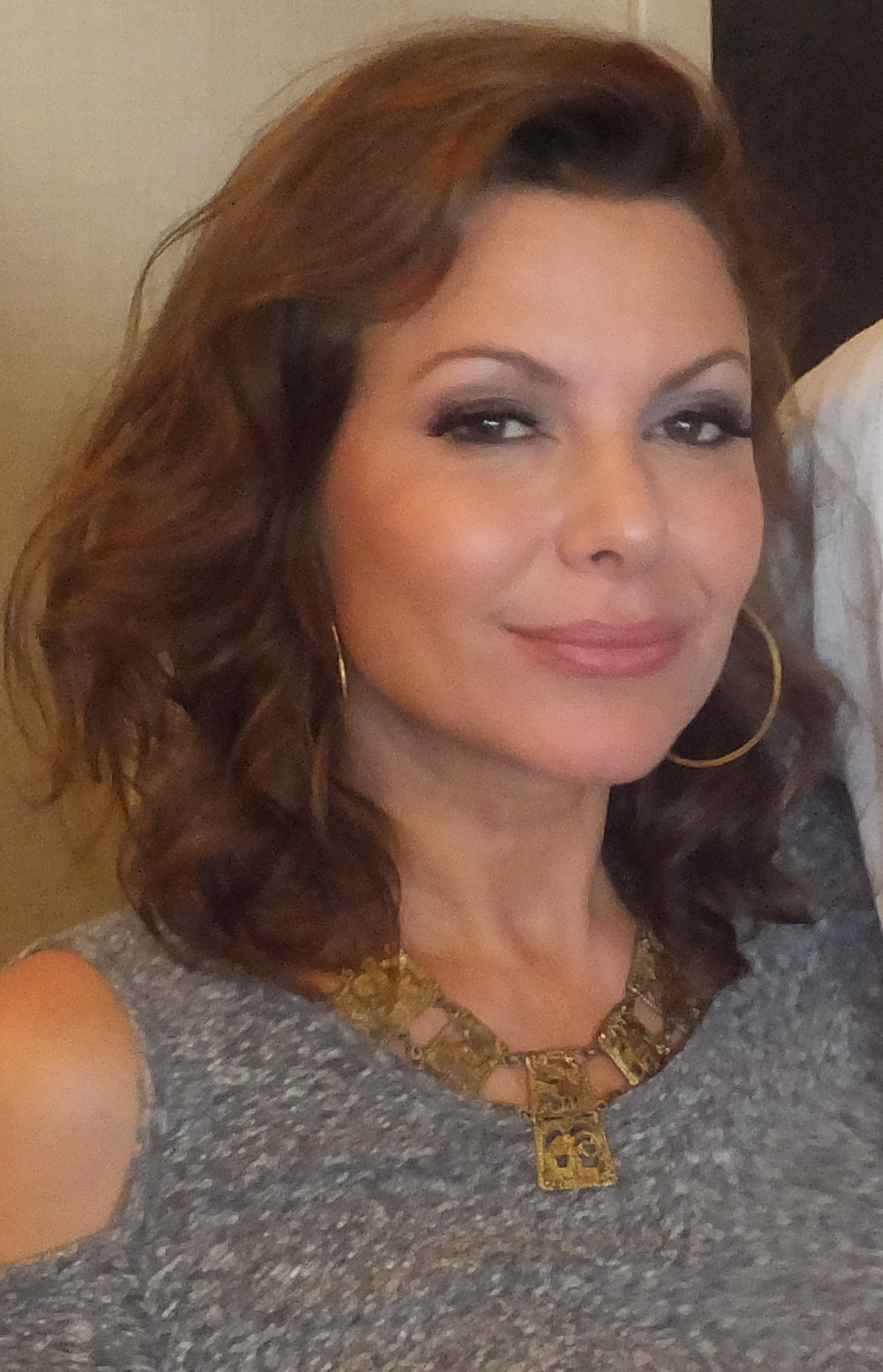
- Wuhrer in 2014
- Born: Kari Samantha Wuhrer; April 28, 1967 (age 59)
- Other names: Kari Wührer; Kari Salin; Kari Wührer Salin; Kari Salin-Wührer
- Education: New York University Tisch School of the Arts; Marymount Manhattan College; Columbia University; RADA; Brookfield High School
- Occupations: Actress; model; singer; producer
- Years active: 1986–present: singer, model 1988–present: actress
- Known for: The Avengers: Earth's Mightiest Heroes, General Hospital, Eight Legged Freaks, Sliders, Anaconda, Class of '96, Swamp Thing, Remote Control
- Spouses: Daniel Salin (m. 1995; div. 1999) James Scura (m. 2003; div. 2025)
- Children: 3

Kari Samantha Wuhrer (born April 28, 1967) is an American singer, model and actress. She is known for her time as hostess of the MTV game show Remote Control (1988–1989), her portrayals of Abby Holland on USA Network's Swamp Thing (1991–1992), and Maggie Beckett on the Fox/Syfy series Sliders (1997–2000). Wuhrer has appeared in horror films such as Thinner (1996), Anaconda (1997), Eight Legged Freaks (2002), King of the Ants (2003), The Hitcher II: I've Been Waiting (2003), Hellraiser: Deader (2004), two entries in the Prophecy series (both 2005), and Sharknado 2: The Second One (2014). She portrayed Agent Tanya in cutscenes of Westwood Studios' real-time strategy video game Command & Conquer: Red Alert 2 and its subsequent expansion pack, Yuri's Revenge. Her final screen appearance was in the 2018 made-for-television movie Fiancé Killer.

== Career ==
Wuhrer's first television break was MTV's Remote Control (1988). She was a regular cast member of the television series Swamp Thing from 1991 to 1992. She also worked as a VJ on MTV during the same period. In 1993, she was a regular in the TV series Class of '96, where she played college student Robin Farr. From 1994 to 1995, she starred as Ariel Hunter in the long-running primetime soap opera Beverly Hills, 90210.

During this period, she appeared in The Adventures of Ford Fairlane (1990) and starred in Beastmaster 2: Through the Portal of Time (1991). In 1995, she also had a supporting role in the John Singleton film Higher Learning, followed by Thinner (1996), Anaconda (1997), and Kissing a Fool (1998).

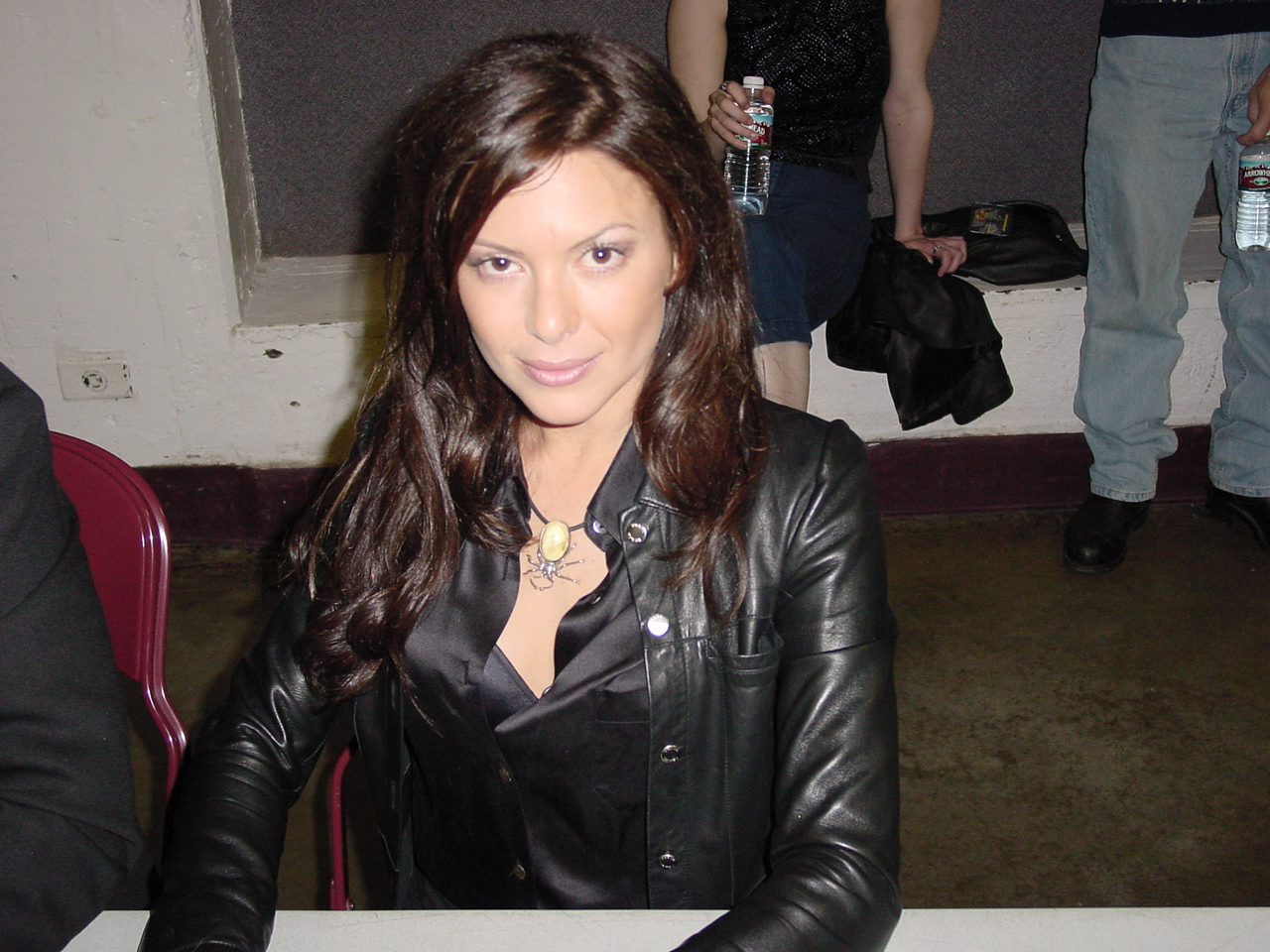
Wuhrer in 2002

Wuhrer returned to television in 1997 on the series Sliders as Maggie Beckett, joining the cast as a regular and staying until the series ended in 2000. Wuhrer also guest-starred in the TV series Leverage.

Wuhrer signed a record deal with Rick Rubin, and her only album, Shiny, was released in 1999 by Del-Fi Records. In addition to her singing, she wrote most of the songs on the album and played both the guitar and the flute on several tracks. To promote the album, Wuhrer made an appearance on Late Night with Conan O'Brien that was noted for its awkwardness.

Her later mainstream film roles include Berserker (2001) and Eight Legged Freaks (2002). She was an executive producer of the direct-to-video film Spider's Web, with Stephen Baldwin, of which Wuhrer said: "The pace of making this movie, it was extreme. It was the longest day imaginable...".

Wuhrer is also known by gamers for her role as Agent Tanya in cutscenes of Westwood Studios' real-time strategy video game Command & Conquer: Red Alert 2 and its subsequent expansion pack, Yuri's Revenge.

Wuhrer was later voted number 76 on the FHM 100 Sexiest Women of 2000, number 73 in the FHM 100 Sexiest Women in the World of 2001, and number 36 in Maxim magazine's 50 Sexiest Women Countdown of 1999. She posed seminude in Playboy in August 2000 as their Babe of the Month, and earlier considered multiple offers to appear fully nude throughout 1998. She was also number 64 on Celebrity Skin's 100 Sexiest Stars of All Time and number four in the Celebrity Nudity Database's Most Popular Actresses of 1999.

Her breast implants encapsulated during the filming of Spider's Web, so she had them removed in 2002.

From February 3, 2005, through November 2005, Wuhrer joined the cast of the daytime soap opera General Hospital as FBI Agent Reese Marshall, the former love interest of mobster Sonny Corinthos and former best friend/rival of Carly Corinthos. Wuhrer's character died after suffering injuries in a train wreck. In January 2006, Wuhrer announced that she was suing General Hospital, claiming that she was fired because of her pregnancy.

== Personal life ==
Wuhrer married Daniel Salin in 1995. This union ended in divorce in 1999.

Wuhrer married James Scura in 2003. They separated in 2022 and the union ended in divorce in 2025. They have three children, a son born in January 2004, a daughter born in March 2006 and another daughter born in September 2008.

== Filmography ==
=== Film ===
Year	Title	Role	Notes
1986	Fire with Fire	Gloria	
1990	The Adventures of Ford Fairlane	Melodi	
1991	Beastmaster 2: Through the Portal of Time	Jackie Trent	
1994	The Postgraduate	Jane Decue	Short
1994	Boulevard	Jennefer	
1994	Sensation	Lila Reed	
1995	Higher Learning	Claudia	
1995	Sex and the Other Man	Jessica Hill	
1995	Beyond Desire	Rita	Video
1995	The Crossing Guard	Mia	
1996	The Disappearance of Kevin Johnson	Kristi Wilson	
1996	Terminal Justice	Pamela Travis	
1996	Thinner	Gina Lempke	
1996	An Occasional Hell	Jeri Gillen	
1997	Red-Blooded American Girl II	Miya Falk	
1997	Anaconda	Denise Kalberg	
1997	The Undertaker's Wedding	Maria Strachitella	
1997	Touch Me	Margot	
1998	Kissing a Fool	Dara	
1998	Ivory Tower	Karen Clay	
1998	Phoenix	Katie Shuster	
1999	Kate's Addiction	Kate McGrath	
1999	Vivid	Billie Reynolds	
2000	Out of Sync	Sunni	TV movie
2000	Kiss Tomorrow Goodbye	Darcy Davis	TV movie
2000	Fatal Conflict	Sasha Burns	
2000	Sand	Sandy	
2000	G-Men from Hell	Marete Morrisey	
2001	Thy Neighbor's Wife	Ann Stewart / Anna Johnson	
2001	The Medicine Show	Gwendolyn	
2002	The Rose Technique	Kristi	
2002	Do It for Uncle Manny	Jenny Marsh	
2002	Angels Don't Sleep Here	Dr. April Williams	
2002	Malevolent	Jessica Tarrant	
2002	Killer Love	Danielle	
2002	Eight Legged Freaks	Sheriff Samantha Parker	
2002	Spider's Web	Lauren Bishop	Video
2003	Death of a Dynasty	Sexy Woman #2	
2003	Final Examination	Julie Seska	Video
2003	King of the Ants	Susan Gatley	
2003	The Hitcher II: I've Been Waiting	Maggie	Video
2004	Berserker	Anya / Brunhilda	
2005	Mystery Woman: Snapshot	Fawn	TV movie
2005	Hellraiser: Deader	Amy Klein	Video
2005	The Prophecy: Uprising	Allison	Video
2005	The Prophecy: Forsaken	Allison	Video
2007	The Air I Breathe	Correspondent	
2010	Justice League: Crisis on Two Earths	Model Citizen / Black Canary (voice)	Video
2010	A Fork in the Road	Deputy	Video
2012	Tornado Warning	Gail Curtis	TV movie
2014	Sharknado 2: The Second One	Ellen Brody	TV movie
2015	Batman Unlimited: Monster Mayhem	Silver Banshee (voice)	Video
2015	Secrets of a Psychopath	Catherine	
2017	Vixen: The Movie	Patty (voice)	Video
2018	Batman: Gotham by Gaslight	Barbara Kean (voice)	
2018	Fiancé Killer	Nicole	TV movie

=== Television ===
Year	Title	Role	Notes
1988–1989	Remote Control	Herself / Host	Main Host: Season 2–3
1991	Married... with Children	Joanie	Episode: "Kelly Does Hollywood: Part 1 & 2"
1991–1992	Swamp Thing	Abigail	Recurring Cast: Season 1, Guest: Season 2
1992	P.S. I Luv U	Jennifer	Episode: "The Chameleon"
1993	Class of '96	Robin Farr	Main Cast
1994–1995	Beverly Hills, 90210	Ariel Hunter	Recurring Cast: Season 4, Guest: Season 5
1995	MTV's Sandblast	Co-host	Season 2
1995	The Marshal	Sherry Prairie	Episode: "The Great Train Robbery"
1997	The Big Easy	Gina Forte	Episode: "Don't Shoot the Piano Player"
1997	Nash Bridges	C.J.	Episode: "Blackout"
1997–2000	Sliders	Maggie Beckett	Recurring Cast: Season 3, Main Cast: Season 4–5
1998	To Have & to Hold	Paula	Recurring Cast
1999	Jeopardy!	Herself / Celebrity Contestant	Episode: "1999-A Celebrity Jeopardy! Game 1"
2002	CSI: Crime Scene Investigation	Tiffany Langer	Episode: "Cross Jurisdictions"
2005–2006	General Hospital	Reese Marshall	Regular Cast
2006	CSI: Miami	Janet Sterling	Episode: "If Looks Could Kill"
2007–2008	Lincoln Heights	Kimberly Lund	Guest: Season 2, Recurring Cast: Season 3
2008	Stargate Atlantis	Nancy Sheppard	Episode: "Outcast"
2010	Leverage	Miranda Miles	Episode: "The Reunion Job"
2010–2012	The Avengers: Earth's Mightiest Heroes	Maria Hill	Recurring Cast
2015	Vixen	Patty	Recurring Cast: Season 1

=== Video games ===
Year	Title	Role	Notes
2000	Command & Conquer: Red Alert 2	Special Agent Tanya Adams	
2001	Command & Conquer: Yuri's Revenge	Special Agent Tanya Adams	
2013	Marvel Heroes	Maria Hill	
2014	Disney Infinity 3.0	Maria Hill	

== Awards ==
Year	Work	Award	Category	Result
2001	Do It for Uncle Manny	New York International Independent Film and Video Festival	Best Actress	Won

== Discography ==
Studio albums

- Shiny (1999)
