= Deuteronomium =

Deuteronomium may refer to:

- Deuteronomy, the fifth book of the Hebrew Bible
- Deuteronomium (band), a Christian death metal band
- Deuteronomium - Der Tag des jüngsten Gerichts, a 2004 Swiss horror film

== See also ==
- Deuteronomy (disambiguation)
