= The Prophecy II =

- DVD cover
- Directed by: Greg Spence
- Written by: Matt Greenberg; Greg Spence
- Based on: Characters by Gregory Widen
- Produced by: Joel Soisson; W.K. Border
- Starring: Christopher Walken; Russell Wong; Jennifer Beals; Brittany Murphy; Steve Hytner
- Cinematography: Richard Clabaugh
- Edited by: Christopher Cibelli; Ivan Ladizinsky
- Music by: David C. Williams
- Distributed by: Dimension Films
- Release date: January 20, 1998
- Running time: 83 minutes
- Country: United States
- Language: English

The Prophecy II is a 1998 American fantasy-action-horror film and the second installment in The Prophecy series. Christopher Walken reprises his role as the Archangel Gabriel. It was directed by Greg Spence and written by Spence and Matt Greenberg.

== Plot ==
Lucifer (Guri Weinberg) ejects Gabriel from Hell, claiming the War of Heaven isn't his to fight, and Hell isn't big enough for both of them. Gabriel's new mission is to prevent the birth of a child, a nephilim, the offspring of an angel and a human. The coming of this child, said to precede reconciliation between the warring factions in heaven, has been prophesied by Thomas Daggett, now a monk. The child's conception takes place when Valerie, a nurse, is seduced by an attractive stranger (the angel Danyael) whom she hit with her car. She finds out a few days later that she is pregnant.

Gabriel attempts to find the whereabouts of the child from Daggett, but kills him when he refuses to help. When Danyael kills members of Gabriel's army of angels, Gabriel instead employs the assistance of Izzy, a teenage girl who has just committed suicide with her boyfriend. Gabriel keeps her alive to help him in his search for Valerie (despite his angelic powers, he is completely naive about technology and unable to drive a car or work a computer, so he has her use her computer skills to find her and drive him around).

Gabriel's war against Danyael and the other angels climaxes in a battle in Eden, now an industrial wasteland. Danyael and Izzy are killed, but Valerie defeats Gabriel by seizing him and jumping from a building, confident that God will protect her as He told her He would (she reveals that Gabriel is unable to hear His voice as he simply does not listen); she is indeed unharmed, but Gabriel is impaled on a spike. As punishment, Gabriel is turned into a human by Michael. Valerie raises the child by herself, accepting the risk that the angels may come for her. The film ends with Gabriel as a derelict; a face in the sky and ominous clouds show that the war in Heaven is not over.

== Cast ==
- Christopher Walken as Gabriel
- Russell Wong as Danyael
- Jennifer Beals as Valerie Rosales
- Brittany Murphy as Isabelle "Izzy"
- Nicki Micheaux as Detective Kriebel
- Eric Roberts as Michael
- Glenn Danzig as Samayel
- Steve Hytner as Joseph
- Bruce Abbott as Thomas Daggett
- William Prael as Rafayel
- Renee Victor as Lida Rosales
- Elizabeth Dennehy as Dr. Kathy Kimball
- Danny Strong as Julian
- J. G. Hertzler as Father William
- Michael Raimi as Danyael, Jr.

== Production ==
Following his time directing and co-writing Children of the Corn IV: The Gathering, Miramax executives offered Greg Spence The Prophecy II as a follow-up after being impressed with Children of the Corn IV's rough cut which Spence accepted. Spence wrote the film alongside Matt Greenberg with little interference from Miramax with the only real mandates being the return of Christopher Walken's Gabriel and the introduction of the Archangel Michael. Spence said that his intention with the sequel was to further develop the mythology established in the first film while also making the film more genre driven with more scares as well as incorporating some fish out of water type humor with Walken's Gabriel.

== Reception ==
Rotten Tomatoes, a review aggregator, reports that 33% of six surveyed critics gave the film a positive review; the average rating is 4.7/10.

TV Guide rated it 1/5 stars and called it "a dull and cheap-looking direct-to-video sequel". Nathan Rabin of The A.V. Club wrote: "While at times amusing, and far from unwatchable, The Prophecy II's quirky strengths can't compensate for the fact that it's about as frightening as your average episode of Psi Factor". Robert Sellers of the Radio Times rated it 2/5 stars and compared it unfavorably with the original film. Witney Seibold of CraveOnline wrote that the sequel suffers from overfamiliarity and thus becomes "a pretty rote action thriller". Nicholas Sylvain of DVD Verdict wrote: "If you aren't a Walken fan, then you have my sympathies, because there's not much else here for you".

== See also ==
- List of films about angels
