= Scott Cleverdon =

Scottish actor

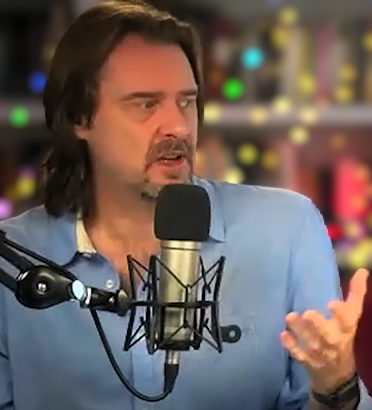
- Cleverdon in 2023
- Born: 31 July 1969 (age 57); Edinburgh, Scotland
- Education: Royal Conservatoire of Scotland
- Occupation: Actor
- Years active: 1992–present
- Spouse: Assumpta Serna (m. 1993)

Scott Cleverdon (born July 31, 1969) is a Scottish actor best known as the angel Pyriel in the film The Prophecy 3: The Ascent. He has also done significant voice acting.

Cleverdon was born and raised in Edinburgh, attending Broughton High School, Edinburgh and trained in Glasgow's Royal Scottish Academy of Music and Drama. In 1994, he voiced Cletus Kasady / Carnage in Spider-Man. In 2008, Cleverdon starred in the film Ecstasy based on The Undefeated from Irvine Welsh's best-selling novel Ecstasy: Three Tales of Chemical Romance.

From 2011, he played Gonzalo Fernández de Córdoba in the series Borgia, which also starred his wife, actress Assumpta Serna.

== Personal life ==
Cleverdon married Spanish actress Assumpta Serna in 1994. They live in Madrid, Spain and have taught film acting since the publication of Assumpta Serna's book El Trabajo del Actor de Cine.

== Filmography ==
=== Film ===
Year	Title	Role	Notes
1996	Germans	Willi Sonnenbruch	
1997	Kiss & Tell	Scott DeBirdy	
1997	McHale's Navy	David	
1999	Kill the Man	Revolutionary	
2000	The Prophecy 3: The Ascent	Pyriel	
2004	Soccer Dog: European Cup	Alex Foote	
2005	Soldier of God	Geoffrey	
2006	The Amazing Grace	Oliver	
2006	Goya's Ghosts	French General	
2007	Tortilla Heaven	Jesus	
2022	The Dog Knight	Monsieur Dogtanian, Captain Bloodhound, additional voices	English dub

=== Television ===
Year	Title	Role	Notes
1992	No Job for a Lady	Craig	Episode: "A Bed for the Night"
1992	Soldier Soldier	Lt. Nesbitt	Episode: "Something Old, Something New"
1993	Agatha Christie's Poirot	President	Episode: "The Case of the Missing Will"
1993	Taggart	Jeremy Napier	Episode: "Fatal Inheritance"
1994	Sharpe's Company	Harry Price	
1995	Baywatch Nights	Photographer	Episode: "Pursuit"
1996	Gargoyles	Rory Dugan/Cuchulain, Jason Canmore, Jon Canmore, John Castaway, Thug (voice)	4 episodes
1996	Spider-Man: The Animated Series	Cletus Kasady/Carnage, Michael Pingree (voice)	3 episodes
1996	The Sentinel	Connor	Episode: "True Crime"
1997	Beverly Hills, 90210	Neil Phillips	Episode: "Phantom of CU"
1998	The New Batman Adventures	Thomas Blake (voice)	Episode: "Cult of the Cat"
1999	Batman Beyond	Jack (voice)	Episode: "Dead Man's Hand"
1999	Royal Standard	Loki	Television film
2000	Rebus	"Pretty Boy" Summers	Episode: "The Hanging Garden"
2003	Aquí no hay quien viva	Trevor	Episode: "Érase una huelga"
2005	Murphy's Law	Daniel McGeechan	Episode: "Disorganised Crime"
2005	55 Degrees North	Cory North	1 episode
2007	Dear Green Place	Vigo Masterson	Episode: "Bandstand"
2007	Wedding Belles	Kevin	Television film

=== Video games ===
Year	Title	Role	Notes
1999	Star Wars: Episode I – The Phantom Menace	Obi-Wan Kenobi	
2000	Star Wars Episode I: Jedi Power Battles	Obi-Wan Kenobi	
2000	Star Wars: Jar Jar's Journey Adventure Book	Obi-Wan Kenobi	
