= Red-Blooded American Girl II =

- Directed by: David Blyth
- Written by: Nicolas Stiliadis
- Produced by: Paco Alvarez; Nicolas Stiliadis
- Starring: Kari Wuhrer; Kristoffer Ryan Winters; Burt Young; David Keith
- Cinematography: Edgar Egger
- Edited by: Nick Rotundo
- Music by: Paul Zaza
- Production company: SC Entertainment
- Release date: 1997
- Running time: 95 minutes
- Country: Canada
- Language: English

Red-Blooded American Girl II (also known as Hot Blooded, Red Blooded 2, and Hit & Run) is a 1997 Canadian thriller film by New Zealand-born director David Blyth. It is billed as a sequel to Blyth's 1990 film Red Blooded American Girl, despite featuring a different cast and premise.

== Plot ==
College student Trent Colbert is making a cross country trip to visit his parents when he encounters a prostitute named Miya Falk. He gets caught up in her world of crime, and the two are eventually forced to go on the run from the police. Through these rigorous endeavors the two fall in love with each other.

== Cast ==
- Kari Wuhrer as Miya Falk
- Kristoffer Ryan Winters as Trent Colbert
- Burt Young as Roy Falk
- David Keith as Mr. Colbert
- Elaine Martyn as Mrs. Colbert
- Nicholas Pasco as State Trooper Vukelich
- Roland Rothchild as State Trooper Whitman
- Philip Riccio as Jimmy
- Art MacDonald as Buster
- Joanne Takahashi as Vinnie
- Clinton Walker as Pez

== Production ==
Filming occurred in Ontario, Canada. Kari Wuhrer is listed as Kari Salin in the credits.

== Release ==
It was first released direct-to-video in Europe and Australia during 1997. The film was released to the American home video market in the fall of 1998, also airing on cable networks in the region.

The film's predecessor Red Blooded American Girl was distributed on VHS by Paramount Pictures, although they had no involvement with this film.

== Reception ==
Dave Nuttycombe of Washington City Paper wrote in his review, "Actors may take their names off a film, but their breasts remain. The box, the ads, and my photographic memory of her perky curvaceousness from previous DTV efforts all say that Kari Wuhrer is in this film. The opening credits read “Kari Salin.” If the ex-videotrix was unhappy playing a toe-sucking, whip-cracking whore, she might have raised objections while reading the script. Maybe she balked after filming scenes with a shirtless Burt Young (he's in surprisingly good shape, but still...). And while her impressive body does much of the storytelling, Kari's never fully exposed and gets lines like, 'You're not going to pout all day for being an accessory to murder, are you?'"

In his 2015 book Spinegrinder: The Movies Most Critics Won’t Write About, author Clive Davies called it a "a useless road movie that isn't really a sequel".
