= The Prophecy: Forsaken =

2005 film by Joel Soisson

- DVD cover
- Directed by: Joel Soisson
- Screenplay by: Joel Soisson
- Story by: John Sullivan
- Based on: Characters by Gregory Widen
- Produced by: Ron Schmidt
- Starring: Kari Wuhrer; Jason Scott Lee; John Light; Jason London; Tony Todd
- Cinematography: Gabriel Kosuth
- Edited by: Kirk Morri
- Music by: Joseph LoDuca
- Distributed by: Dimension Films
- Release date: September 6, 2005
- Running time: 75 minutes
- Country: United States
- Language: English

The Prophecy: Forsaken is a 2005 American fantasy-action horror-thriller film and the fifth and final installment in The Prophecy series. The film stars horror veteran Tony Todd, martial artist Jason Scott Lee, and frequent horror star Kari Wuhrer.

Following the events of The Prophecy: Uprising, Allison is still protecting the Lexicon, an ancient book that will foretell the name of the coming Antichrist, from renegade angels called Thrones who are led by a sinister character called Stark. Allison is assisted by Dylan, a contract killer, who was initially hired to kill Allison but has a change of heart.

== Plot ==
The film opens with a brief flashback to the previous film as Father Constantine finds the Lexicon - the final book of God's prophecy and its continuing to write itself - in the catacombs of his church. When he keels over from a heart attack, now it's up to a grad student, Allison (Kari Wührer), to keep it from the forces of darkness.

In the streets of Bucharest, a young girl named Maria loses her ball into the busy street. Suddenly, Lucifer (reprised by John Light) appears to her and tells her she should go get it. Almost trancelike, she wanders into the street and as a result is run over by a vehicle. Allison witnesses the whole thing and runs to the little girl's side. The girl tells Allison she has a message for her, but she cannot give it to her yet.

On her way down, Allison brushed into Dylan (Jason Scott Lee) who was standing at the entrance to her apartment building. He is sitting in a dark room assembling and loading his gun. A mysterious figure named Stark (Tony Todd) behind him discusses "the job" he was hired to do: to kill Allison. Dylan tries to take the noble route and shoots himself in the head rather than take another life. Not to be discouraged, Stark brings Dylan back to life on the spot and tells him that the brief taste of hell he just tasted should convince him to work for Stark.

Dylan breaks into Allison's house and holds her at gunpoint, and tells her that he was hired to do a job, but something is telling him that she is different. She was meant to live. He wants to know why she should live and she responds that she has been entrusted with a responsibility, but she will not say what it is. Torn between doing the right thing and doing his job, Dylan kidnaps Allison and takes her with him. Stark breaks into the apartment a short time later; he tears the place apart and finds the Lexicon, but is only a decoy, a set of magazine articles bound together in the Lexicon's cover.

Dylan takes Allison to his "friend" Gabriella's house to get her a wig, some perfume, and some iron pills. The iron pills change the taste of her blood and the perfume changes her smell. Angels hunt by smell and taste (according to the first The Prophecy film). As they are escaping from a group of angels, Dylan explains the angel hierarchy - Cherubim and Seraphim are the most dangerous. He then sends her on her way and goes back to fight a hopeless battle to buy her time. The perfume and iron pills do the trick and Allison is able to escape. Stark's thrones capture Dylan and bring him before Stark. Stark claims to Dylan that Allison is going to start genocide the likes of which the world has never seen, so Dylan should have killed her when he had the chance.

Allison goes to the only "person" she can – Lucifer. He explains that the Lexicon is going to name the Antichrist in a matter of hours. The angels in Heaven do not want that kind of information falling into the hands of the wrong people, but there are laws in Heaven against killing people, hence the hired assassin. For Heaven, Allison turned their hired gun before he could finish the job. He then tells her that he will not get involved in this one, despite the fact that he already had.

When Allison comes out of his rickety old mansion, there are two angels waiting to take her. She races across the field until she comes upon a funeral procession for the young girl Maria, who Lucifer sent to her death in the opening. The angels lose track of her in the crowd. The procession ends at an old church, which is safe ground for Allison. Meanwhile, Stark continues to torture Dylan because he still needs him, especially since Allison trusts Dylan now. Stark tells Dylan to get her out of the church, and they will take care of the rest.

Back inside the church, Allison hears the voice of the little girl calling to her: she says that she feels so cold, and tells her that the "bad angels" do not want humans in Heaven. They are trying to keep them out, so she cannot let them have the book, no matter what. Dylan shows up at the church and stays with Allison through the night; he asks her if she is sure that she is on the right side in this war. Allison claims that "you have to take some things on faith". Dylan takes a look outside and sees dozens of angels waiting for them; worried, he feels that they must get out of there soon or else there will be hundreds by the morning. Thus, he tells Allison to wait for his signal and then run directly to his car. When she gets there, though, he has locked her out; the double-cross is complete.

The angels capture Allison and bring her before Stark; he tells her that he is against the whole messy idea of Armageddon. If they can find the name of the Antichrist, they can kill the child before the apocalypse and save humanity. Allison claims she's not keen on the idea of going over God's head, and she doesn't think he is either or she'd already be dead. Stark promises to kill her if he has to, but he lets her leave for now.

As Allison leaves, she runs into Lucifer in the park; he helps her reason through what has happened. Stark and a few of the other seraphim aren't happy with the idea of Armageddon. After all, it means Heaven will be flooded with humans, beloved by God above even the seraphim themselves. Lucifer however likes the idea of Armageddon because it will mean that a billion new corrupt souls will appear on his doorstep.

She leaves to check on the Lexicon's hiding place, but she's attacked by a homeless man. A voice whispers to her that it is time to fight back; that is just what she does - she fights off the homeless man and snaps his neck. Stark and Dylan have already figured out where she has hidden it as Dylan remembered that she used to take a walk through the same park every day. Stark says she would have gone that way to check on the Lexicon, and thus they head to an abandoned house that Stark theorizes contains the Lexicon.

Allison sees them heading for the house and breaks in through the cellar. The Lexicon has finished its task of writing the name of the Antichrist—Mykael Paun, and he shall bear four distinct marks on his face. Allison grabs the book and climbs the stairs to the top of the building. Stark is in hot pursuit; he catches up to her on the roof, cornering her and claims that the child is there in Bucharest. He then asks her if she wonders why she was chosen and how she's been able to keep the Lexicon from creatures more powerful than her. He states that she is a "nephalim", a half-breed between an angel named "Simon" (a character from the first film) and a human, bred specifically to protect the Lexicon; therefore Allison is nothing more than a tool.

Dylan, who is feeling the effects of death more than ever, staggers to the roof; he is caught between them. Allison tells him to accept God's will on faith, but Stark is telling him to complete his task so he can be done with this miserable existence. Dylan is torn; he goes back and forth between them before shooting Allison repeatedly in the chest. Nevertheless, there was method in his madness; as Allison falls over the precipice, the pages of the Lexicon scatter everywhere. The winds carry them throughout the streets of Bucharest, and Allison survives due to her "nephalim" healing powers. Now, Stark has no way of tracking them all down. The final page, the one Stark was looking for, falls at the feet of a young boy named Mykael Paun.

== Cast ==
- Kari Wuhrer as Allison
  - Smaranda Popescu as Young Allison
- Jason Scott Lee as Dylan
- Boris Petroff as Father Constantin
- Tony Todd as Stark
- John Light as Lucifer
- Daria Ciobanu as Maria
- Georgia Nica as Gabrielle
- Adriana Butoi as Allison's Mother
- Mihai Verbițchi as Allison's Father
- Jason London as Simon
- Nicu Constantin, Vasilescu Valentin, Adrian Pavlovschi, George Grigore as Thrones

== Development ==
The Prophecy: Uprising and The Prophecy: Forsaken were filmed simultaneously in Bucharest, Romania.

== Reception ==
Marco Lanzagorta of PopMatters wrote that "not even Todd's terrifying presence can save this film from the mediocrity that characterizes most of Dimension's horror fare". Whitney Seibold wrote: "It's a little hard to understand, but you can see the script trying to work in something profound". Beyond Hollywood called it a boring film with too much pointless dialog. Scott Weinberg of DVD Talk rated it 1.5/5 stars and wrote: "This abbreviated little turkey is too endlessly drab, dry, and dreary to even deliver unintentional chuckles".

== See also ==
- List of films about angels
