= List of films about angels =

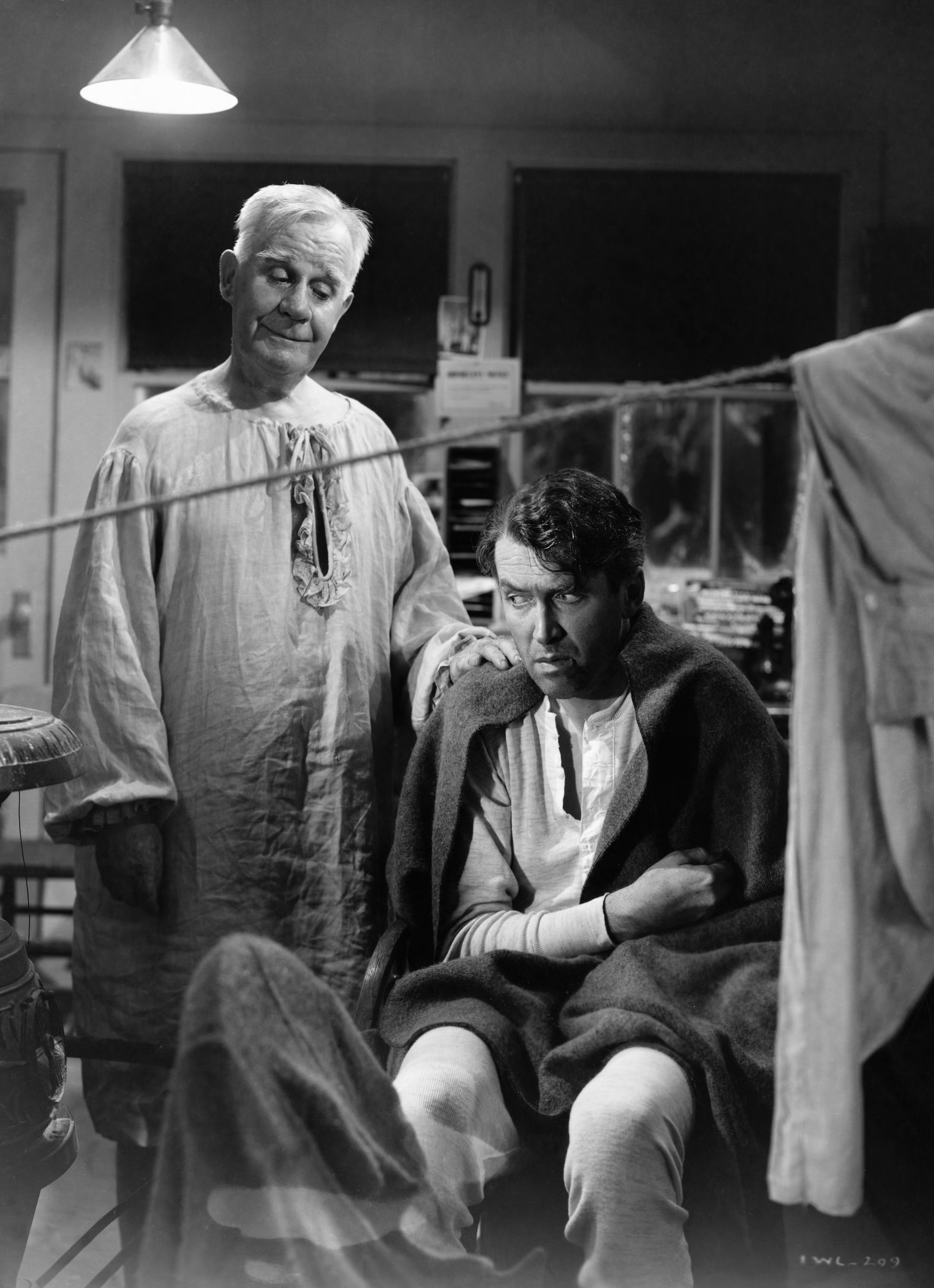
Guardian angel Clarence Odbody showed George Bailey that life is worth living in the 1946 film It's a Wonderful Life.

This is a list of films where angels appear.

Angel films are sometimes discussed in relation to Peter L. Valenti's definition of the 'film blanc', a variety of fantasy film characterised by "1) a mortal's death or lapse into dream; 2) subsequent acquaintance with a kindly representative of the world beyond, most commonly known as Heaven; 3) a budding love affair; 4) ultimate transcendence of mortality to escape the spiritual world and return to the mortal world.' Angel films have also been discussed as the product of 'reform ideology' in early 20th century America; as sharing similarities with ghost films; and in relation to medieval art.

== Angels ==
=== 1890s ===
- The Temptation of Saint Anthony (1898)

=== 1900s ===
- Joan of Arc (1900)
- The Christmas Angel (1904)

=== 1930s ===
- Gabriel Over the White House (1933)
- Liliom (1934)
- The Passing of the Third Floor Back (1935)
- The Green Pastures (1936)

=== 1940s ===
- Here Comes Mr. Jordan (1941)
- Donald's Decision (1942)
- I Married an Angel (1942)
- A Guy Named Joe (1943)
- Cabin in the Sky (1943)
- Heaven Can Wait (1943)
- That's the Spirit (1945)
- The Horn Blows at Midnight (1945)
- A Matter of Life and Death (1946)
- It's a Wonderful Life (1946)
- The Temptation of Barbizon (1946)
- Down to Earth (1947)
- Heaven Only Knows (1947)
- The Bishop's Wife (1947)
- The Foxy Duckling (1947)
- Johnny Appleseed (1948)

=== 1950s ===
- For Heavens Sake (1950)
- Angels in the Outfield (1951)
- The Angel Who Pawned Her Harp (1954)
- Carousel (1956)
- Forever, Darling (1956)
- Once Upon a Honeymoon (1956)
- The Story of Mankind (1957)
- The Angel Who Pawned Her Harp (1959)
- An Angel on Wheels (1959)

=== 1960s ===
- The Gospel According to St. Matthew (1964)
- The Greatest Story Ever Told (1965)
- The Bible: In the Beginning... (1966)
- Barbarella (1968)
- Teorema (1968)

=== 1970s ===
- The Angel Levine (1970)
- Willie Mays and the Say-Hey Kid (1972)
- Charley and the Angel (1973)
- The Devil in Miss Jones (1973)
- It Happened One Christmas (1977)
- The Angel and the Woman (1977)
- Heaven Can Wait (1978)
- All That Jazz (1979)

=== 1980s ===
- Oh Heavenly Dog! (1980)
- Christmas Mountain (1981)
- The Angel (1982)
- The Kid with the Broken Halo (1982)
- Stuck on You! (1982)
- The Simple-Minded Murderer (1982)
- Brainstorm (1983)
- Two Of A Kind (1983)
- Tu mi turbi (1983)
- Hail Mary (1985)
- One Magic Christmas (1985)
- The Heavenly Kid (1985)
- Date with an Angel (1987)
- Made in Heaven (1987)
- Wings of Desire (1987)
- The Last Temptation of Christ (1988)
- All Dogs Go to Heaven (1989)
- Always (1989)
- Chances Are (1989)

=== 1990s ===
- Almost an Angel (1990)
- Clarence (1990)
- Mr Destiny (1990)
- Bill & Ted's Bogus Journey (1991)
- Defending Your Life (1991)
- Faraway, So Close! (1993)
- Heart and Souls (1993)
- Angels in the Outfield (1994)
- It Could Happen to You (1994)
- Making Waves (1994)
- Les Anges Gardiens (1995)
- All Dogs Go to Heaven 2 (1996)
- Michael (1996)
- The Preacher's Wife (1996)
- Unlikely Angel (1996)
- A Life Less Ordinary (1997)
- Angels in the Endzone (1997)
- An All Dogs Christmas Carol (1998)
- City of Angels (1998)
- The Book of Life (1998)
- My Guardian Debil (1998)
- What Dreams May Come (1998)
- Wide Awake (1998)
- A Season for Miracles (1999)
- Dogma (1999)
- Mary, Mother of Jesus (1999)
- The Flint Street Nativity (1999)

=== 2000s ===
- Angels in the Infield (2000)
- Little Nicky (2000)
- The Legend of Bagger Vance (2000)
- A Town Without Christmas (2001)
- Delivering Milo (2001)
- Down to Earth (2001)
- Gabriel & Me (2001)
- Saint Mary (2001)
- Three Days (2001)
- It's a Very Merry Muppet Christmas Movie (2002)
- Lilya 4-ever (2002)
- Finding John Christmas (2003)
- Northfork (2003)
- Opopomoz (2003)
- Angel Wars (2004)
- Christmas at Water's Edge (2004)
- Deuteronomium - Der Tag des jüngsten Gerichts (2004)
- When Angels Come to Town (2004)
- Angel-A (2005)
- Angel of the Lord (2005)
- Elizabethtown (2005)
- Mary (2005)
- Xuxinha e Guto contra os Monstros do Espaço (2005)
- A Prairie Home Companion (2006)
- The Nativity Story (2006)
- Ángeles S.A. (2007)
- Gabriel (2007)
- Hancock (2008)
- Killer Pad (2008)
- Pokémon: Giratina and the Sky Warrior (2008)
- Knowing (2009)
- The Vintner's Luck (2009)

=== 2010s ===
- Christmas Cupid (2010)
- Legion (2010)
- Passion Play (2010)
- What If... (2010)
- Pak! Pak! My Dr. Kwak! (2011)
- The Adjustment Bureau (2011)
- Henry & Me (2014)
- Noah (2014)
- Winter's Tale (2014)
- The Night Before (2015)
- Angel of the Lord 2 (2016)
- Angels in Notting Hill (2016)
- Fallen (2016)
- A Dark Song (2016)
- Angry Angel (2017)
- Buttons: A Christmas Tale (2018)
- Holy Expectations (2019)

=== 2020s ===
- Angels Fallen (2020)
- Christmas on the Square (2020)
- Afterlife of the Party (2021)
- The Asian Angel (2021)
- Why the Nativity? (2022)
- Journey to Bethlehem (2023)
- Mary (2024)
- Rita (2024)
- Eternity (2025)
- Good Fortune (2025)
- The Phoenician Scheme (2025)

== Fallen/dark angels ==
- Liliom (1930)
- Liliom (1934)
- Dark Angel: The Ascent (1994)
- The Prophecy (1995)
- Spawn (1997)
- Fallen (1998)
- The Prophecy II (1998)
- End of Days (1999)
- The Prophecy 3: The Ascent (2000)
- Wishmaster 3: Beyond the Gates of Hell (2001)
- Van Helsing (2004)
- Van Helsing: The London Assignment (2004)
- Constantine (2005)
- The Prophecy: Uprising (2005)
- The Prophecy: Forsaken (2005)
- Click (2006)
- Ghost Rider (2007)
- Dante's Inferno: An Animated Epic (2010)
- Legion (2010)
- Ghost Rider: Spirit of Vengeance (2012)

== Television series ==
- Highway to Heaven (1984–1989)
- Heaven Help Us (1994)
- Touched by an Angel (1994–2003)
- Jól á leið til jarðar (1994)
- Angels in America (2003)
- Twice in a Lifetime (1999–2001)
- Supernatural (2005–2020)
- Eternal Law (2012)
- The Bible (2013)
- Lucifer (2016–2021)
- Good Omens (2019–2026)
- Miracle Workers (2019)
- Nobody's Looking (2019)
- Hazbin Hotel (2024–)

== See also ==
- List of angels in fiction
- List of Christmas films
- List of films about demons
- Shoulder angel
