= Rescue 77 =

American television series

- Genre: Medical drama
- Created by: Gregory Widen
- Starring: Victor Browne; Christian Kane; Marjorie Monaghan; Richard Roundtree
- Country of origin: United States
- Original language: English
- No. of seasons: 1
- No. of episodes: 8

Production
- Executive producers: Gregory Widen; Aaron Spelling; E. Duke Vincent; Kevin Arkadie
- Running time: 45 minutes
- Production company: Spelling Television

Original release
- Network: The WB
- Release: March 15 – May 3, 1999

Rescue 77 is an American medical drama television series about the professional and personal lives of paramedics in Los Angeles, California. The series created by Gregory Widen and aired from March 15 to May 3, 1999, on The WB. The creator and executive producer was Gregory Widen, a former Southern California firefighter and paramedic, and the writer of the 1991 firefighting drama Backdraft. His goal for the show was to provide a more realistic depiction of the lives of firefighters and paramedics than previous emergency medical television series such as Emergency!

== Summary ==
The show followed the members of a three-person paramedic team assigned to a fictional Los Angeles fire station, Station 77. Kathleen Ryan returns to work in the pilot episode following an emotional breakdown after a stressful call. Throughout the series, there is obvious romantic tension between Ryan and her partner Michael Bell, who is dating a nurse and struggling with his father, who wants Bell to quit his paramedic job and work for the family company. The third member of the team, Wick Lobo, is a young, energetic rookie eager to prove himself. The main characters shared a high sense of duty and loyalty to each other and their commander, Captain Durfee.

== Cast ==
=== Main ===
- Victor Browne as Michael Bell
- Christian Kane as Wick Lobo
- Marjorie Monaghan as Kathleen Ryan
- Richard Roundtree as Captain Durfee

=== Recurring ===
- Terence Knox as Firefighter Bridges
- Robia Scott as Nurse Maggie Cates
- Jon Cypher as Charles Bell

== Episodes ==
No.	Title	Directed by	Written by	Original release date	Prod. code
1	"Pilot"	Eric Laneuville	Gregory Widen	March 15, 1999	3398000
2	"Career Day"	Kevin Hooks	Jeffrey Vlaming	March 16, 1999	3398002
3	"A Bumpy Ride"	Christopher Leitch	Lois Johnson	March 22, 1999	3398004
4	"The Wedding"	Eric Laneuville	Josef Anderson	March 23, 1999	3398003
5	"Remember Me: Part 1"	Eric Laneuville	Gregory Widen	March 29, 1999	3398001
6	"Remember Me: Part 2"	Harvey S. Laidman	Gregory Widen & Don O. Knowlton	April 5, 1999	3398005
7	"Tunnel Vision"	Eric Laneuville	Eric Laneuville & Melissa Baker	April 26, 1999	3398007
8	"Mustard Gas, Hold the Mayo"	Reynaldo Villalobos	Kevin Arkadie	May 3, 1999	3398006
