= Red Blooded American Girl =

- Directed by: David Blyth
- Written by: Allan Moyle
- Produced by: Nick Stiliadis
- Starring: Andrew Stevens; Heather Thomas; Christopher Plummer; Kim Coates
- Release date: 1990
- Running time: 89 minutes
- Country: Canada
- Language: English

Red Blooded American Girl is a 1990 Canadian science fiction horror film written by Allan Moyle, directed by David Blyth and starring Andrew Stevens, Heather Thomas, Christopher Plummer and Kim Coates.

== Premise ==
A young woman is transformed into a vampire by a virus. The vampire doctor who's treating her hires a young scientist to find a cure. He and the girl fall for each other hard, but she, mad from hunger, escapes to wreak havoc on the city.

== Cast ==
- Andrew Stevens as Owen Augustus Urban III
- Heather Thomas as Paula Bukowsky
- Christopher Plummer as Dr. John Alcore
- Kim Coates as Dennis
- Lydie Denier as Rebecca Murrin
- Andrew Jackson as Donald

== Reception ==
TV Guide gave a mixed review: "Plummer's commanding presence gives the enterprise a shot of class, but it needed a massive transfusion."

Fred Haeseker of the Calgary Herald awarded the film two stars and praised Plummer's performance.

== Sequel ==
An in name only sequel titled Red-Blooded American Girl II was released in 1997, with none of the original's cast and a different storyline; only director David Blyth connects the two films. In his 2015 book Spinegrinder: The Movies Most Critics Won’t Write About, author Clive Davies called it a "a useless road movie that isn't really a sequel".
