= Albert Nelson (actor) =

American-born actor (born 1976)

- Born: Albert Nelson; United States
- Occupation: Actor
- Years active: 1976–

Albert Nelson is an American-born actor who appeared in the 1976 David Bowie film The Man Who Fell to Earth as well the horror movie The Prophecy. He has also appeared in numerous television dramas and commercials.

== Filmography ==
- The Man Who Fell to Earth (1976) as Waiter
- The Prophecy (1995) as Grey Horse
