= Deuteronomy (disambiguation) =

Deuteronomy is the fifth book of the Jewish Torah and of the Christian Old Testament.

Deuteronomy may also refer to:

- Dewey Duck, full name Deuteronomy Duck in Quack Pack
- Deuteronomy (band), an American psychedelic power pop band
- Old Deuteronomy, a character in T. S. Eliot's Old Possum's Book of Practical Cats

== See also ==
- Deuteronomium (disambiguation)
- Deuteronomistic history/Deuteronomic history
