= Nicu Constantin =

Romanian actor (1939–2009)

- Nicu Constantin in the comedy La Telefon
- Born: 31 July 1939; Eforie Sud, Constanța County, Romania
- Died: 15 September 2009 (aged 70); Bucharest, Romania
- Occupation: Actor
- Years active: 1967–2009
- Spouse: Măndiţa Constantin 1986–2009 (his death)

Nicu Constantin (Romanian pronunciation: [ˈniku konstanˈtin]; 31 July 1939 – 15 September 2009) was a Romanian actor.

== Films ==
1. The Prophecy: Forsaken (2005)
2. Ministerul comediei
3. Borvizomanii (1988)
4. Muşchetarii în vacanţă
5. Secretul lui Bachus (1984)
6. Alo, aterizează străbunica! (1981)
7. Grabeşte-te încet (1981)
8. Întoarcerea la dragostea dintîi (1981)
9. Ora zero (1979)
10. Lupuşor şi Mieluţu (1975) (TV)
11. Vin cicliştii (1968)
12. Împuşcături pe portativ (1967)
