= Assumpta Serna =

Spanish actress and author (born 1957)

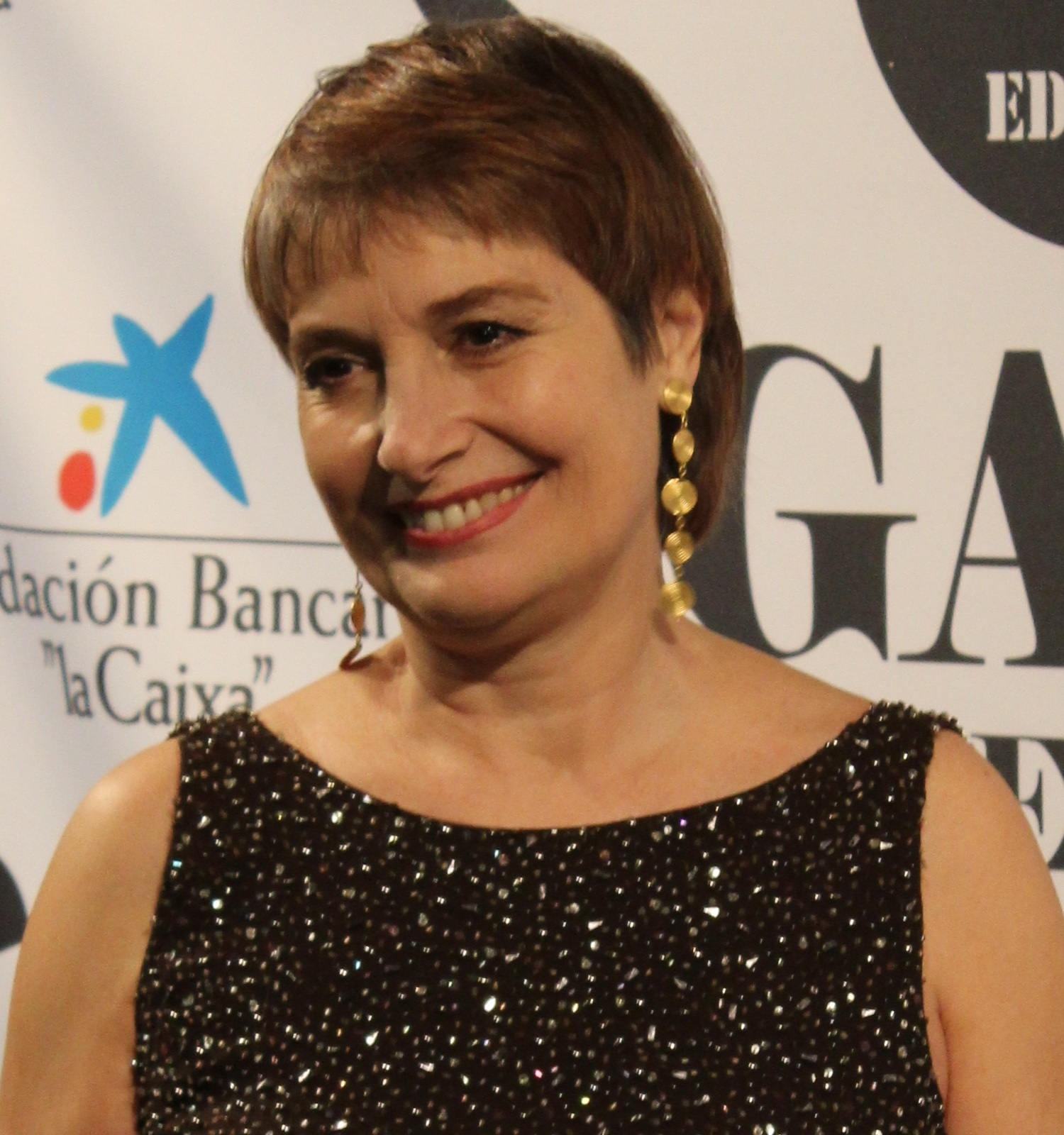
- Serna in 2018
- Born: María Asunción Rodés Serna; 16 September 1957 (age 69); Barcelona, Spain
- Occupation: Actress
- Years active: 1978–present
- Spouse: Scott Cleverdon (m. 1993)

María Asunción Rodés Serna (born 16 September 1957), better known as Assumpta Serna, is a Spanish actress and author. Serna has performed in 20 countries in six languages and is the recipient of more than 20 international awards.

== Biography ==
Serna was born in Barcelona, Spain. She studied law until she was 19, after which she "preferred being an actor" and joined the Barcelona's School of Dramatic Arts.

In 1994, she married her co-star in Sharpe's Company, Scott Cleverdon, who portrayed Lieutenant Harry Price in the film.

== Acting career ==
In her career as an actress, Serna felt she was more successful in foreign countries than in her own country. Speaking in a 2016 interview, she said:

A veces siento vergüenza de ser española y pienso que esto no hay quien lo enderece... Como actriz me siento desaprovechada en mi país pero muy aprovechada fuera.

— Assumpta Serna
Translation:

Sometimes I feel ashamed to be Spanish and I think that there is no one who can fix it... As an actress I feel wasted in my country but really appreciated outside.

=== Film ===
Serna is known for her starring role in I, the Worst of All (1990) portraying the Mexican poet, philosopher and proto-feminist Sor Juana. She co-starred with Antonio Banderas in Matador (1986), one of the first films by Pedro Almodóvar, and she appeared in such films as Wild Orchid (1990), Chain of Desire (1992), Nostradamus (1994), The Shooter (1995), The Craft (1996) and Kiss & Tell (1997).

Although she predominantly played European roles, Serna has also played Colombians in the films Managua with Louis Gossett Jr. and Drug Wars in Michael Mann's series.

Her most recent movie is ¡He matado a mi marido! (filmed October–November 2016) directed by Francisco Lupini, with María Conchita Alonso and Eduardo Yáñez.

=== Television ===
Serna is known for portraying a Spanish guerrilla in the first four of ITV's Sharpe series of television films based on the novels of Bernard Cornwell, Anna Cellini in Falcon Crest and Catherine of Aragon in Henry VIII opposite Helena Bonham Carter and Ray Winstone. She also acted on the popular Spanish TV series Aquí no hay quien viva. From 2011 to 2014, Serna played one of the female leads, Vannozza dei Cattanei, mistress of Cardinal Rodrigo Borgia, in Tom Fontana's historical drama Borgia.

She co-produced with Wildcard UK a documentary called Fresco Fiasco and acted in the movie Behold the Monkey, two films about the famous restoration of the Ecce Homo which attracted more than 200,000 visitors from 170 countries to the little town of Borja to see the painting. Both projects were seen in February 2016 on the Sky Arts network in the UK.

== Educator and other work ==
Serna has written two books on acting technique: Screen acting or El trabajo del actor de cine (1999), which was the first book to be written in Spanish regarding the craft of film-acting, and Monologues in V.O. (2001), a resource for auditioning actors.

They formed Fundación First Team and, since 2000, have taught 4,000 students in 6 countries in collaboration with various film schools and film festivals. The last workshop was at the Guadalajara International Film Festival in Mexico. Foundation First Team always include disabled and under-privileged people in their courses.

Through Foundation First Team, Serna has published First Female directors of Spanish movies, written by Conchita Martínez Tejedor.

Serna served as President of AISGE (Actores e Intérpretes – Sociedad de Gestión de España), Spain's society of managing intellectual property rights for actors.
