= The Prophecy: Uprising =

- DVD cover
- Directed by: Joel Soisson
- Screenplay by: Joel Soisson
- Story by: John Sullivan
- Based on: Characters by Gregory Widen
- Produced by: Ron Schmidt
- Starring: John Light; Sean Pertwee; Kari Wuhrer; Jason London; Doug Bradley
- Cinematography: Gabriel Kosuth
- Edited by: Kirk Morri
- Music by: Joseph LoDuca
- Distributed by: Dimension Films
- Release date: June 7, 2005
- Running time: 88 minutes
- Country: United States
- Language: English

The Prophecy: Uprising is a 2005 fantasy-action-horror-thriller film film and the fourth installment in The Prophecy series. This chapter does not feature series regular Christopher Walken, instead starring Doug Bradley, British actor Sean Pertwee, and frequent horror film actress Kari Wuhrer in the lead roles.

This installment continues with the tale of war between angels. In the first war between the angels, Lucifer was cast out of heaven and became the creator of hell. Soon another war between angels started. This time there are two camps: one faction that hates humans and wants them to fall from God's grace, and a second group that helps humans.

== Plot ==
In Romania, theology student Allison has come into possession of The Lexicon, a mysterious book of prophecies that writes itself. This book contains a 23rd chapter of the Book of Revelation, which is still not complete. The last chapter depicts the end of the war of angels and the name of the Antichrist. One of the angels who fell with Lucifer, Belial (now a demon), wants this book. Simon, a good angel, opposes him and guides Allison by taking advantage of her mental illness to speak directly to her. While searching for Allison and the book, and to avoid detection, Belial murders people and takes their form.

Lucifer, pretending to be Interpol agent John Riegert, seeks the help of Dani Simionescu, a police officer who, as a child, provided information to the Romanian secret police about his parents. His parents and baby sister were brought to one of the secret police headquarters and tortured. His baby sister got hurt and was given up for adoption. Lucifer, as Riegert, reveals that she is Allison. During the investigation, Riegert uses Dani to help track Belial and locate his sister. After the police arrest Belial's current host, Belial possesses one of Dani's coworkers, Laurel.

After revealing himself, Lucifer brings Dani to the house that was the site of the inhumane tortures. Allison, with guidance of the voices in her head, reaches the same place, followed by Belial, as Laurel. It is the only place where Belial cannot hurt Allison. It is a place of evil, which makes it Lucifer's domain, and he offers Allison his protection. Lucifer explains that, for his own motives, he is willing to assist humanity, as he does not wish Belial to succeed, though he is unable or unwilling to take direct action.

Dani confesses his sins and seeks forgiveness but is rebuked by his sister. It is here that real motives are revealed. Belial, who was once loyal to Lucifer, has grown tired of the war between angels and its blurring of morality. Even Lucifer has taken more of shade of gray, and Belial wants to return to the black and white morality of earlier times. Lucifer opposes him because he wants to prolong the fighting and prevent a new Hell from emerging. Dani, realizing that Belial needs a host, shoots Laurel, but, before he can kill himself, he is possessed. Allison kills her brother, and Lucifer absorbs Belial's soul. After Allison forgives her brother, she leaves the house.

At dawn, Lucifer tells Allison that, for the present, the war of angels is over, but it will not be for long. Showing her glimpses of her future, he advises her to keep the book safe.

== Cast ==
- John Light as John Riegert / Lucifer
- Sean Pertwee as Dani Simionescu
- Kari Wuhrer as Allison
- Jason London as Simon
- Doug Bradley as Laurel
- Georgina Rylance as Calra
- Stephen Billington as Ion
- Dan Chiriac as Serban
- Boris Petroff as Father Constantin
- Alin Cristea as Cantor
- Mihai Verbițchi as Allison's Father

== Development ==
The Prophecy: Uprising and The Prophecy: Forsaken were filmed simultaneously in Bucharest, Romania. Furthermore, these films are the first to not have Christopher Walken and Steve Hytner reprise their roles as the Archangel Gabriel and the coroner Joseph, respectively.

== Reception ==
Witney Seibold of CraveOnline called it convoluted and "a little hard to follow". Marco Lanzagorta of PopMatters wrote that despite having a convoluted plot, he considered it not an entirely bad film. Beyond Hollywood wrote: "Uprising isn't really a bad movie, although if judged as a standalone film, it's very short and incomplete". Scott Weinberg of DVD Talk rated it 1.5/5 stars and called it "a picture-perfect example of squeezing a cinematic stone for its last droplet of blood".

== See also ==
- List of films about angels
