= Backdraft 2 =

2019 action thriller film

- DVD cover
- Directed by: Gonzalo López-Gallego
- Written by: Gregory Widen
- Based on: Characters by Gregory Widen
- Produced by: Raffaella De Laurentiis
- Starring: Joe Anderson; William Baldwin; Donald Sutherland
- Cinematography: José David Montero
- Edited by: Gonzalo López-Gallego
- Music by: Randy Edelman
- Production companies: Imagine Entertainment; Raffaella Productions; Nexus Factory uMedia
- Distributed by: Universal Pictures Home Entertainment
- Release date: May 14, 2019
- Running time: 101 minutes
- Country: United States
- Language: English

Backdraft 2 (also known as Backdraft II) is a 2019 American action thriller film directed by Gonzalo López-Gallego and written by Gregory Widen. A sequel to the 1991 film Backdraft, also written by Widen, it stars Joe Anderson, with William Baldwin and Donald Sutherland reprising their respective roles as Brian McCaffrey and Ronald Bartel from the original film. It was released on a direct-to-video format by Universal Pictures Home Entertainment on May 14, 2019.

== Synopsis ==
Arson investigator Sean McCaffrey, son of the late Lieutenant Stephen "Bull" McCaffrey, works out of Station 17 of the Chicago Fire Department, one of the units in the division run by his uncle, Deputy District Chief of the Chicago Office of Fire Investigation (OFI) Brian McCaffrey. Sean prefers working alone and is initially rude when Station 17's Captain White tells him he must follow protocol and work with a partner, Maggie Rening.

The new team is assigned a fire which killed five youngsters on Halloween. After they confirm the fire is arson, they later catch an arsonist who tells them that he had turned down a massive fee to set the Halloween fire. Sean talks with Ronald Bartel, a murderous arsonist who has been in prison for decades. Bartel provides insight that includes the involvement of terrorists led by Albert "Tall Albert" Smith, using fires to distract from the theft of missiles. Albert plants a bomb in Sean's home to murder him. Sean calls Brian and tells him about what happened. Brian arrives and sees if he can defuse it but dies in the process. A funeral is held for Brian, and Sean bids farewell to him just as he bid farewell to his father decades earlier. Ronald expresses condolences to Sean and explains where Tall Albert and his henchmen possibly hang out. Sean and Maggie go after Albert and his gang, who are subsequently caught and defeated.

== Cast ==
- Joe Anderson as Sean McCaffrey, Fire Marshal of Chicago Office of Fire Investigation (OFI) and son of the late Lieutenant Steven “Bull” McCaffrey.
- Alisha Bailey as Maggie Rening
- William Baldwin as Brian McCaffrey, Deputy District Chief of Chicago Office of Fire Investigation (OFI), Assistant Chief (AC)
- Donald Sutherland as Ronald Bartel
- Alastair Mackenzie as Firehouse Captain White
- Dominic Mafham as ATF Agent Ralph Kunz
- Jessamine-Bliss Bell as Jenny Yang, a Geologist
- Martin Hutson as FBI Agent
- Aaron McCusker as OFI Investigator Touhy
- Cyril Nri as OFI Investigator Rickets
- Ross O'Hennessy as Jack
- Paul Birchard as CPD Homicide Lieutenant Doyle
- Adam J. Bernard as CFD Engine Lieutenant Walker
- Emily Barber as PR Flak
- Mark Arnold as Fire Chief Soto
- Sia Alipour as Spark
- Bogdan Farcas as Albert "Tall Albert" Smith
- Patrick Walshe McBride as Dylan

== Release ==
The film was released on Blu-ray, DVD, and digital on May 14, 2019.

== Reception ==
On the review aggregator website Rotten Tomatoes, 40% of 5 critics' reviews are positive, with an average rating of 2/10. Alex McLevy of The A.V. Club gave it a positive review, writing: "This is the kind of brainless but trashily enjoyable film that would suit the bill when you're looking for something to watch hungover on a lazy Sunday afternoon".
