= Soldier of God =

- Directed by: W.D. Hogan
- Written by: Kathryn Kuhlen and Mir Bahmanyar
- Produced by: Mir Bahmanyar
- Starring: Tim Abell; Mapi Galán; Nicholas Kadi; William Mendieta
- Cinematography: Neil Lisk
- Edited by: Cynthia Ludwig
- Music by: Greg Walsh
- Production company: Vides Cinematografica
- Release date: 2005
- Running time: 94min
- Countries: United States, filmed in California and Malaga, Spain
- Language: English

Soldier of God is a 2005 American historical film directed by W.D. Hogan and starring Tim Abell.

== Plot ==
A Knights Templar meets a mysterious Muslim in the desert. They find refuge in an oasis at home of a beautiful woman. As the Knight falls for the woman and the simple life, he questions his Crusader ethos. But the Muslim holds a secret that will be bring devastation and change their lives for ever.

== Reception ==
The Mediavalists reviewed the film, stating: "Soldier of God is a relatively low budget production, but it doesn’t come across as cheap, or suffer as a result of its financial limitations. Most of the actors in this movie aren’t well known in terms of Hollywood star-power, but that’s irrelevant; the acting is solid and engaging."

== Cast ==
- Tim Abell as Rene
- Bill Mendieta as Hasan
- Mapi Galán as Soheila
- Nicholas Kadi as Omar
- Scott Cleverdon as Geoffrey
- Michael Desante as Yaqut
- William Morgan Sheppard as Raymond of Tripoli
- T. J. Storm as Muslim Champion
