= Back to Back (film) =

1996 film by Roger Nygard

- DVD cover
- Directed by: Roger Nygard
- Written by: Roger Nygard; Scott Nimerfro
- Starring: Michael Rooker; Ryo Ishibashi; Danielle Harris
- Narrated by: W.K. Border; Thomas Calabrese; Takashige Ichise; Aki Komine; Michael Leahy; Joel Soisson
- Cinematography: Mark W. Gray
- Edited by: Dawn Hoggat
- Music by: Walter Werzowa
- Release dates: August 29, 1996 (Oldenburg); October 25, 1996 (U.S.)
- Running time: 86 minutes 97 minutes (Argentina)
- Country: United States
- Language: English

Back to Back, also known as American Yakuza 2, and Back to Back: American Yakuza 2, is a 1996 American action film. It is directed by Roger Nygard and written by Nygard and Scott Nimerfro (who is credited under the name, Lloyd Keith). The film was produced by W.K. Border, Thomas Calabrese, Takashige Ichise, Aki Komine, Michael Leahy, and Joel Soisson. It stars Michael Rooker, Ryo Ishibashi, and Danielle Harris. It's unrelated to the 1993 film American Yakuza.

== Plot ==
An explosive situation erupts when a mob war thrusts a yakuza, an ex-cop, and his adolescent daughter into a deadly, no-win situation. Booted in disgrace from the L.A. police force Bob Malone suffers a seemingly endless unlucky streak. Matters don't improve when a robbery led by a crazed criminal transpires at the bank where Malone is filling out foreclosure papers. Witnessing the crime, something inside Malone snaps and he single-handedly wipes out most of the robber gang. Unfortunately, the ringleader escapes and Malone ends up jailed by his corrupt former colleague Lt. Tony Dussecq. At the same time, two Japanese yakuza arrive in L.A. to deliver a special message to L.A.'s most prominent Mafia don. The yakuza are in a restaurant when the bank robber (wearing a vest covered with explosives) bursts in and threatens to blow the place up. One of the Japanese, Koji, intervenes in an explosive sequence. He too ends up at the police station just as Malone's feisty teen daughter Chelsea arrives with bail money. The yakuza suddenly escapes, taking Chelsea and Malone with him as hostages. Now pursued by the crooked coppers and the mob, the unlikely threesome have no choice but to team up to survive.

== Cast ==
- Michael Rooker as Bob Malone
- Ryo Ishibashi as Koji
- Danielle Harris as Chelsea Malone
- John Laughlin as Lieutenant Tony Dussecq
- Koh Takasugi as Hideo
- Bobcat Goldthwait as The Psycho
- Vincent Schiavelli as Leonardo
- Stephen Furst as Jimmy
- Tim Thomerson as Thomas
- Fred Willard as a Loan Officer
- Frank D'Amico as DeLorenzo
- Leland Orser as The Wheelchair Guy
- Jake Johannsen as Officer Jones
- Yasushi "Bert" Kojima as Joe "Snapper"
- Michael "Wheels" Parise as "Little Eddie"
- Nick Dimitri as Vince
- Michael Caradonna as Chad
- Steve Peri as Elvis
- Peter Mele as Lafayette
- Bob Delegall as Sergeant Donahue
- Scott Leva as Officer Williams
- Jon Ross as Officer Tucker
- Steve Akahoshi as Officer Yamaoka
- Ron MacLachlan as Officer Ross
- Randall Huber as Officer Bryant
- Christy Harrell as Joe Snappers Girl #1
- Dawn Morgan as Joe Snappers Girl #2
- Peggy Vesperman as Joe Snappers Girl #3
- Michael Ray Miller as Deviant
- John P. McGarr as Goon

== Release ==
The film premiered at the Oldenburg International Film Festival on August 29, 1996. It was first shown in the United States on the premium cable television network, HBO on October 25, 1996.

== Home media ==
It was released on VHS on July 14, 1998 through BMG video label. It was also released on DVD through Fox Lorber on July 5, 2000. It was released on DVD by Medusa on October 7, 2002 under the title, American Yakuza 2. On July 28, 2003 Prism Leisure released the film on DVD also under the title, American Yakuza 2.
