= John Light (actor) =

English actor (born 1973)

- Born: John Andrew Light; 30 September 1973 (age 53); Birmingham, England
- Education: King Edward VI Camp Hill School for Boys
- Alma mater: London Academy of Music and Dramatic Art
- Occupation: Actor
- Years active: 1994–present
- Spouse: Neve Campbell (m. 2007; div. 2011)

John Andrew Light (born 30 September 1973) is an English television, theatre, and film actor. He has received a Laurence Olivier Award nomination for his supporting performance in the play Taken at Midnight (2014).

== Career ==
Light appeared as Henry Lennox (with Richard Armitage and Daniela Denby-Ashe) in the BBC production North and South from the novel by Elizabeth Gaskell. He played the title character (the son of Rudyard Kipling) in the original Hampstead Theatre production of David Haig's My Boy Jack (1997).

An early screen role came in Cider with Rosie (1998). He played Lord Edward Fitzgerald in the 1999 serialised adaptation of "Aristocrats" by Stella Tillyard. He portrayed British pilot Robert Newman in the German film Dresden, in which he spoke German; and played Geoffrey, Duke of Brittany in the 2003 film The Lion in Winter alongside Patrick Stewart, Glenn Close and Jonathan Rhys-Meyers. He played Satan in two films released in 2005 which were titled The Prophecy: Uprising and The Prophecy: Forsaken. He also appeared in the title role of the 2009 play A New World: A Life of Thomas Paine.

In 2011, he appeared in an episode of BBC TV series Silk as Alan Bradley, a man accused of rape.

In 2013, he appeared as Chief Inspector Roger Nelson in the BBC TV series WPC 56 (series 1), and he appeared as Hercule Flambeau, nemesis of Father Brown, in the BBC TV series Father Brown, a role he has reprised in a recurring capacity.

Has appeared as Professor Felix Garwood in Lewis (2014 series 8 episode 2, both parts (The Lions of Nemea)) and in the pilot episode of the prequel Endeavour.

In 2016, he appeared as Dacourt in the ITV series Maigret episode 1.2 "Maigret's Dead Man".

Light is a prolific stage actor. His theatre performances include the Complete Works Festival in Stratford-upon-Avon, where he starred in Sean Holmes' Julius Caesar as Brutus and in Rupert Goold's The Tempest as Caliban. In 2012, he appeared as the titular character in Thom Pain (based on nothing), a role for which critics praised him.

In 2015, Light starred in the play Taken at Midnight with Penelope Wilton. He received a nomination for an Olivier for Best Supporting Actor in a Play. Soon after he starred as Escamillo in Carmen Disrupted with Sharon Small.

In late 2016 through early 2017, he was in a limited run of Mary Stuart along with Juliet Stevenson and Lia Williams at the Almeida. He continued the role after the play transferred to the West End's Duke of York's Theatre in 2018.

In January 2019, it was announced that John Light would join the cast of Florian Zeller's "The Son." The play ran at the Kiln Theatre from 20 February 2019 through 6 April 2019. He reprised the role in the West End production in autumn 2019 at the Duke of York's Theatre.

He also appeared in Agatha Raisin "The Curious Curate" as Richard Binser (2019) and in Midsomer Murders "Death of the small Coppers" as Luke Fawcett (2018).

Light joined the cast of "Uncle Vanya" at the Theatre Royal Bath for a limited run in summer 2019. The production marked the directorial debut of Rupert Everett. During rehearsals, Everett accidentally injured Light's eye, which later led to Light falling off stage. Light performed using a crutch.

In 2022, Light appeared as a Confederate soldier in Around the World in 80 Days.

== Personal life ==
In 2005, Light began dating Canadian film and television actress Neve Campbell. They became engaged in December 2005, and married on 5 May 2007 in Malibu, California. Campbell filed for divorce from Light on 30 June 2010 in Los Angeles.

== Filmography ==
| Year | Title | Role | Notes |
|---|---|---|---|
| 2000 | The Bill | Tony Rourke | Episode "In The Firing Line" |
| 2000 | Five Seconds to Spare | Paisley | |
| 2001 | Investigating Sex | Peter | |
| 2001 | Band of Brothers | Lieutenant Colonel O. Dobie | Episode 5 "Crossroads" |
| 2001 | Lloyd & Hill | Colin Cochrane | TV movie |
| 2002 | Purpose | John Elias | |
| 2003 | Cambridge Spies | James Angleton | TV miniseries |
| 2003 | Dracula II: Ascension | Eric | |
| 2003 | The Lion in Winter | Geoffrey | TV movie |
| 2003 | The Good Pope | Mattia Carcano (young) | |
| 2004 | North & South | Henry Lennox | TV miniseries |
| 2005 | Heights | Peter | |
| 2005 | The Prophecy: Uprising | John Reigart / Satan | |
| 2005 | The Prophecy: Forsaken | John Reigart / Lucifer | |
| 2006 | Scoop | Poker Player | |
| 2006 | Dresden | Robert Newman | |
| 2007 | Partition | Walter Hankins | |
| 2008 | Four Seasons | Simon Maxwell | |
| 2011 | Albert Nobbs | Mr. Smythe-Willard | |
| 2011 | Silk | Alan Bradley | |
| 2011 | Vera | Andrew Franks | |
| 2012 | Agent Hamilton: But Not If It Concerns Your Daughter | Jason Fox | |
| 2012 | Endeavour | Dempsey | Pilot, 1 episode |
| 2013 | Jo | Pierre Lambert | Season 1, episode 6 |
| 2013 | WPC 56 | Chief Inspector Roger Nelson | 5 episodes |
| 2014 | Lewis | Felix Garwood | 2 episodes |
| 2014 | Atlantis | Diagoras | 2 episodes |
| 2016 | Mars | Paul Richardson | 2 episodes |
| 2016 | Maigret | Dacourt | Season 1, episode 2 |
| 2018 | Midsomer Murders | Luke Fawcett | Season 20, episode 2 |
| 2019 | Agatha Raisin | Richard Bilsner | Season 2, episode 3 |
| 2021 | There's Always Hope | Luke | |
| 2021 | Around the World in 80 Days | Ambrose Abernathy | Season 1, episode 7 |
| 2022 | Murder in Provence | Dr. Marcel Vannier | Season 1, episode 3 |
| 2024 | Showtrial | Adrian Gilligan | Season 2, 5 episodes |
| 2013–present | Father Brown | Hercule Flambeau | Recurring, 14 episodes |
