= Command & Conquer: Yuri's Revenge =

- Yuri's Revenge cover art, with Udo Kier portraying the game's antagonist Yuri
- Developer: Westwood Pacific
- Publisher: EA Games
- Director: John Hight
- Designers: Todd Owens; Dustin Browder
- Programmer: Michael S. Booth
- Artists: Phil Robb; Josh Taylor
- Composer: Frank Klepacki
- Series: Command & Conquer: Red Alert
- Platform: Windows
- Release: NA: October 9, 2001; AU: October 10, 2001; EU: October 19, 2001
- Genre: Real-time strategy
- Modes: Single-player, multiplayer

Command & Conquer: Yuri's Revenge is an expansion pack to Command & Conquer: Red Alert 2 developed by Westwood Studios. The game was released in North America on October 9, 2001. The game is centered on a shadowy ex-Soviet figure named Yuri, who has established a secret army of his own and poses a threat to the free will of the world.

== Plot ==
In Command & Conquer: Yuri's Revenge, the story starts off assuming that the Allies were victorious in Red Alert 2. The game begins with the White House announcing DEFCON 2 status, as Yuri, the former head of the Soviet Psychic Corps, plans to take over the world through mind control, accomplished by activating a secretly built network of Psychic Dominators worldwide. The US launches an air strike on the Psychic Dominator on Alcatraz Island. Despite heavy casualties, the device loses power after its power plant is damaged. But Yuri activates the others, and the rest of the planet quickly succumbs to Yuri's mind control.

=== Allies story branch ===
The Allied commander is sent to San Francisco to defend and activate a time machine; the Allies plan to go back in time and prevent Yuri's Psychic Dominators from ever coming online. Once enough power plants have been secured, the player goes back in time, arriving at the time that Soviet forces are first invading San Francisco. The Soviets, caught by surprise, are defeated, and the Psychic Dominator under construction on Alcatraz Island is destroyed. Later, they rescue Lieutenant General Carville (from the original game) before the Suicide bombing operation and send him to the present.

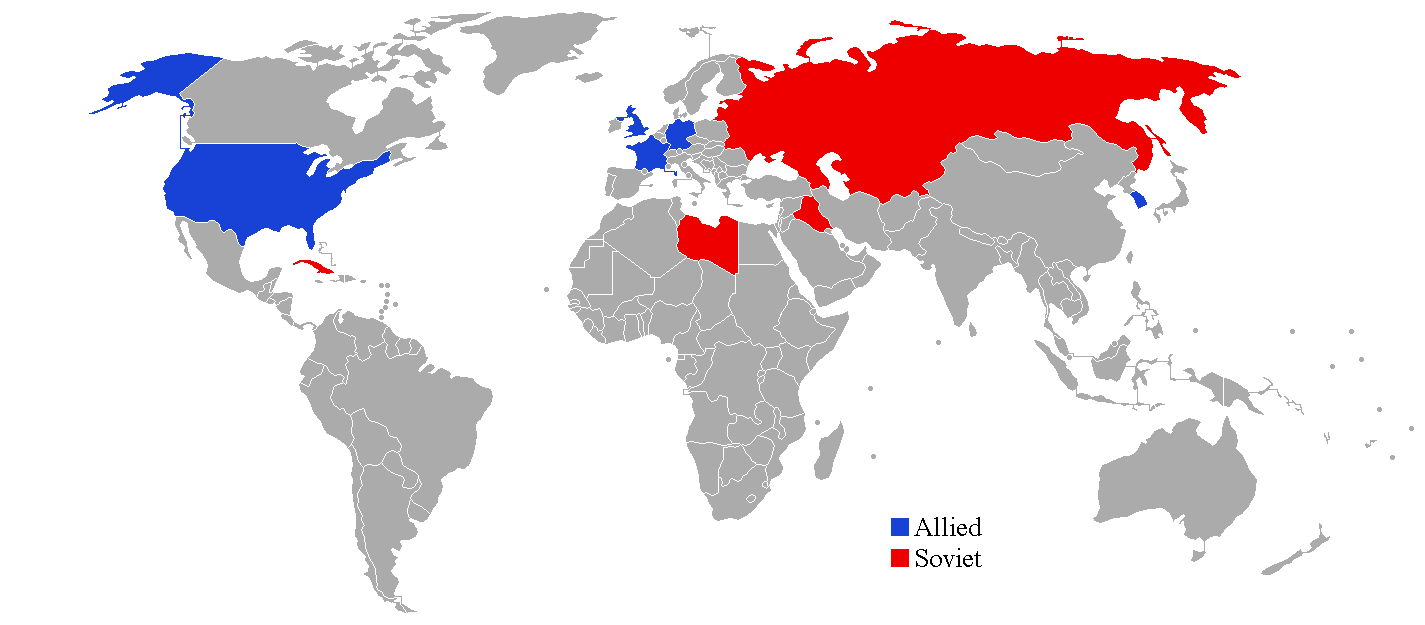
Anachronistic map of Allied and Soviet nations Blue: Allied Red: Soviet *Yuri territory not shown

The Allied commander is deployed to Los Angeles, where Yuri is slaughtering the city's population, converting them to raw materials. The commander liberates Los Angeles with the aid of heavily armed celebrities. (Note: The celebrities were based on prominent Hollywood action heroes: Arnold Schwarzenegger, Sylvester Stallone and Clint Eastwood; their depictions were toned down in a later patch which replaced their names and voice lines with generic equivalents.) Next, the commander is deployed to Seattle after receiving a plea from the chairman of Massivesoft Corporation: (Note: parodies of Bill Gates and the Microsoft Corporation) Yuri has taken control of the Massivesoft campus for funds and development of genetic software. The commander engages in urban warfare to control local power stations, preventing Yuri from powering his nuclear silo while powering the Allied superweapon instead. Following these victories, Yuri captures Albert Einstein, forcing him to work on his Psychic Dominator near the Great Pyramid in Egypt. The Allies commando Tanya Adams, however, frees Einstein, who has sabotaged the Psychic Dominator. The commander gets to use it once before it blows up. The Allied forces then attack Yuri's cloning facility in Sydney, Australia. Yuri intends to kidnap world leaders and replace them with mind-controlled clones.

Wishing to bring the war against Yuri to a conclusion, the Allied and Soviet leaders meet in the Parliament Building in London to sign a peace and joint cooperation treaty. Under Yuri's mind control, Allied Lieutenant Eva divulges the location of the meeting. The Allied Commander is forced to defend the building against Yuri's onslaught long enough for the treaty to be ratified before destroying Yuri's London base with some assistance from the Soviets.

Lieutenant Eva traces Yuri's mind-controlling transmission, exposing his home base on the Antarctic Peninsula. A joint Soviet-Allied invasion is launched, eradicating the base and capturing Yuri, who is locked away in a Psychic Isolation Chamber where he "won't be able to mind-control a fly". Just as General Carville congratulates the commander, the two timelines begins to merge. In the new timeline, instead of Yuri, it is Carville himself who interrupts the emergency meeting at the White House, much to the shock of President Dugan. Meanwhile, Tanya invites the commander to the victory gala, just like she did in the previous timeline. She is, however, interrupted by Lt. Eva this time, who also invites the commander to attend. Tanya complains to Einstein that he didn't get the timeline straight and asks to be sent back to two hours ago. She then, with a wink, tells the commander that she'll catch him on the replay.

=== Soviet story branch ===
A Soviet strike team manages to capture the Allied time machine. After a misuse, which takes the Soviets to the Cretaceous era, the Soviets arrive at San Francisco during the Soviet occupation and destroy Yuri's still-incomplete Psychic Dominator. To prevent a future in which the Soviet Union loses the war to the Allies, the Soviet commander is put in charge of the assault on the Allied Chronosphere prototype in the Black Forest, Germany. This assault would have otherwise failed, as seen in Command & Conquer: Red Alert 2. Without the Chronosphere, the Soviet Union becomes the de facto world superpower and focuses on destroying Yuri.

Yuri has occupied London. Having mind-controlled the Allied forces there, he starts slaughtering its citizens for raw materials and building a Psychic Dominator. To stop this, the Soviet forces infiltrate London and destroy a Psychic Beacon there, freeing the local Allied military from Yuri's mind control. A joint Allied-Soviet force then razes the Psychic Dominator minutes before it becomes operational.

After rescuing the Soviet Premier, whose plane was shot down over Casablanca, Morocco, the Soviet commander is deployed to an uncharted island in the Pacific Ocean where Yuri has set up a large base. After an extensive battle, the base is captured. It is revealed to be a launch facility hosting a spacecraft programmed to fly to the Moon, which Yuri intends to use as a refuge when the Psychic Dominator network goes online. The Soviets use this rocket to send a specialized task force there, razing and looting Yuri's bases.

Yuri is discovered in his ancestral home of Transylvania, where he has combined his own forces with mind-controlled Allied and Soviet forces around his stronghold. Despite his strength, however, the Soviet commander defeats Yuri's forces and razes Yuri's castle. In a last-ditch effort, Yuri activates the time machine which he has stolen from San Francisco. Soviet Lieutenant Zofia interferes, causing Yuri to travel to the early Cretaceous with depleted power reserves. Stranded in time, Yuri is eaten by a Tyrannosaurus Rex. The Soviet Union, having imposed communism over the entire world, begins to build its space program, ready to spread its glorious cause to the far reaches of space.

== Gameplay ==
The core gameplay for Yuri's Revenge is very similar to that of its predecessor, Command & Conquer: Red Alert 2. The objective of the game is to gather resources while training an army to defend the player's base and attack the player's enemies.

=== Additions ===
The expansion presents two new campaigns, one for the Allies and one for the Soviet Union, each consisting of seven missions. A new faction, Yuri, is introduced in Yuri's Revenge, which is the main antagonist in both campaigns and is playable in multiplayer mode but lacks its own single-player campaign. (Note: A cooperative multiplayer campaign exists for all factions, including Yuri.) Yuri's faction consists of mostly new units and buildings, as well as Yuri's Clones and Cloning Vats previously available to the Soviets, and a mobile mining facility which utilizes slave labor. His units generally rely on unconventional tactical elements such as their characteristic mind control.

The factions of Red Alert 2 also receive new features. Allies gain the new Guardian GI anti-tank infantry. Their new Robot Tanks are immune to mind control, and the Battle Fortress mobile bunker can crush enemy vehicles. Their commando, Tanya Adams, can now destroy vehicles. The Soviets receive the Battle Bunker defensive structure from which garrisoned infantry can fire. Their new commando unit Boris, (who replaces Yuri), is capable of defeating most ground units one-on-one and calling air strikes on buildings. Their new Siege Chopper can land and deploy artillery guns. Their new Industrial Plant (which replaces Cloning Vats) decreases the price and build time of vehicles, aircraft, ships, and (Soviet and Allied ore refineries) by 25%.

All unit types now have unique voice lines. In Red Alert 2, this was restricted to infantry and aircraft; vehicles shared the same per-faction voices.

Various support abilities were also added: Force shields, available to all factions, make buildings temporarily invulnerable at the cost of the faction losing power. Soviets have access to spy planes that can explore territory. Yuri can use his psychic radar to reveal territory and has access to the genetic mutator and psychic dominator, the latter of which is as powerful as the weather control device of the Allies and the Soviet nuclear missiles.

The concept of "tech buildings" present in Red Alert 2 was expanded on in Yuri's Revenge. As in Red Alert 2, capturing tech buildings gives the player access to various bonuses, but new buildings were added, and some of the old ones were modified to be more beneficial. New tech buildings include power plants, machine shops for automatic healing for vehicles and ships, hospitals for automatic healing for infantry units, and secret laboratories for unlocking weaponry otherwise not available to the player's faction.

== Reception ==
Reception

Aggregate scores
Aggregator	Score
GameRankings	85%
Metacritic	86/100

Yuri's Revenge has received mostly positive reviews. GameRankings reports an average score of 85% based on 30 reviews. IGN gave the game 8.6 out of 10, saying that it "gives a really excellent game some really impressive enhancements". The lack of a single-player campaign for Yuri's army was noted as a weakness. GameSpot said that "all its new features combine to make Yuri's Revenge ideal or even downright necessary for anyone who enjoyed Red Alert 2", and awarded 8.5 out of 10.

The editors of PC Gamer US named Yuri's Revenge the best expansion pack of 2001, tied with Baldur's Gate II: Throne of Bhaal. They wrote that it "reinvigorates an already excellent game and is yet another reason to purchase Red Alert 2".
