= Gregory Widen =

American screenwriter and film director

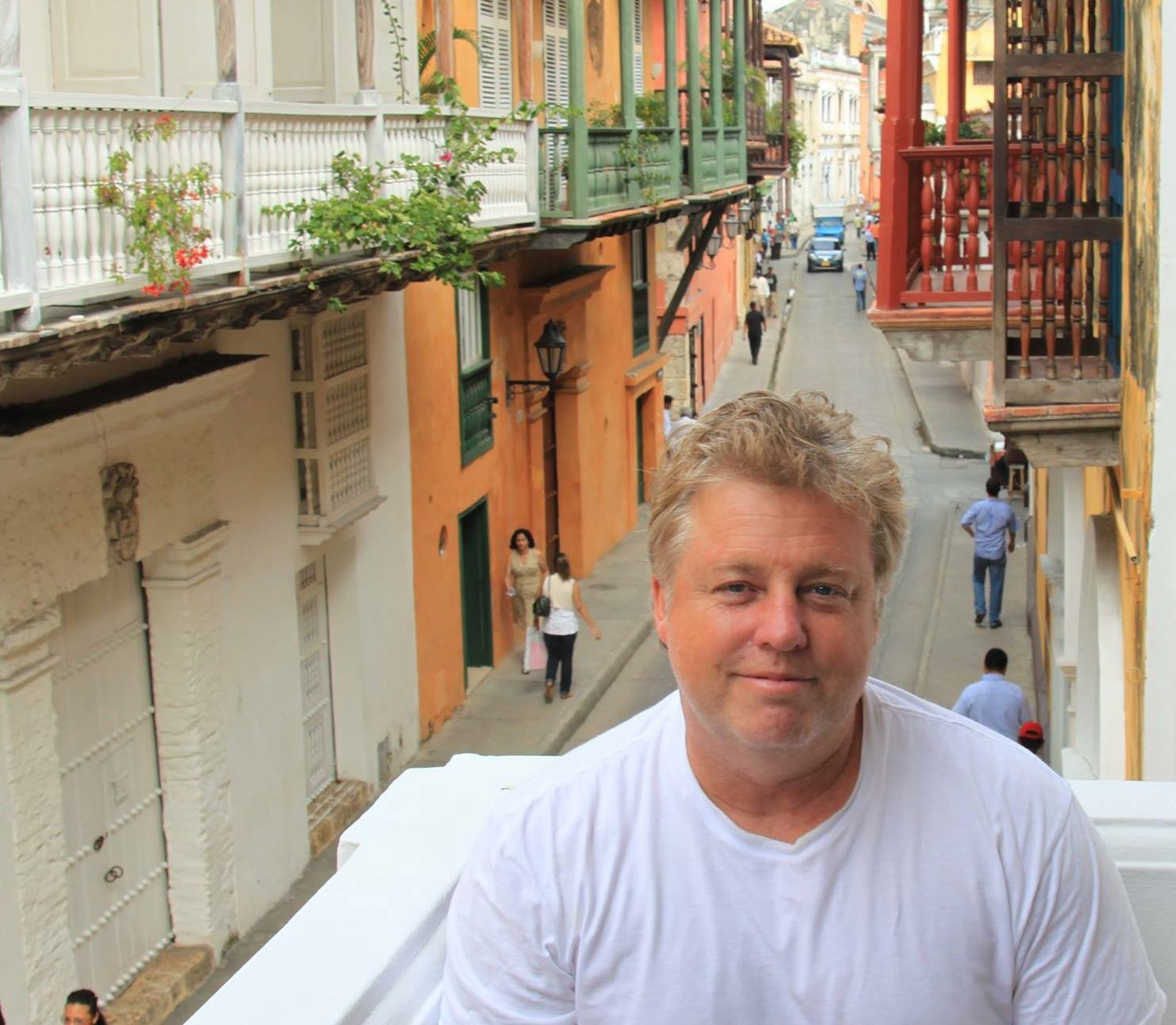
- Born: Gregory Mario Widen
- Education: University of California Los Angeles
- Occupations: Screenwriter; film director; novelist
- Years active: 1986–present
- Known for: Highlander, Backdraft, The Prophecy

Gregory Widen is an American screenwriter and film director. He is the creator of the Highlander film and television franchise, and the writer-director of the cult horror film The Prophecy.

== Early life and education ==
A native of Laguna Beach, California, Gregory Widen holds a master's degree from UCLA and once worked full-time as a city firefighter.

== Career ==
=== Highlander ===
While still an undergrad film student at UCLA, he sold his script for Highlander (1986). The film stars Christopher Lambert, Clancy Brown, and Sean Connery. Its tagline, "There can be only one" has gained pop culture fame. The original movie became a cult classic, spawning five sequels and Highlander: The Series, tie-in novels and video games.

=== Backdraft ===
Widen worked as a firefighter for three years while still an undergraduate at UCLA. He witnessed a person being killed by an explosive backdraft, which became the basis for the screenplay he wrote for the movie Backdraft, directed by Ron Howard and starring Kurt Russell, William Baldwin, Scott Glenn, Donald Sutherland, Robert De Niro. Released in 1991, Backdraft received three Academy Award nominations.

Backdraft was turned into a ride for Universal Studios Hollywood (opened 1992, closed 2010) and Universal Studios Japan (opened 2001, final show in 2020, permanently closed in 2023).

A sequel (Backdraft 2) began production in April 2018.

=== The Prophecy ===
In 1995, Widen wrote and directed the supernatural thriller The Prophecy starring Christopher Walken, Virginia Madsen, Eric Stoltz, and Viggo Mortensen. The film spawned four sequels: The Prophecy II (1998), The Ascent (2000), Uprising (2005) and Forsaken (2005).

=== Television ===
Widen was the creator, writer and executive producer of the series Rescue 77 and wrote for Tales from the Crypt.

=== Novel ===
In 2013 he released his debut novel, Blood Makes Noise published by Thomas & Mercer. The book received critical praise, including a starred review from Publishers Weekly and Booklist.

== Filmography ==
=== Film ===
Year	Title	Director	Writer	Notes
1986	Highlander		Yes	
1991	Backdraft		Yes	Cameo as "Engine Lieutenant"
1995	The Prophecy	Yes	Yes	
2017	OtherLife		Yes	

=== Direct-to-video ===
Year	Title	Writer	Executive Producer
1998	The Prophecy II		Yes
2000	The Prophecy 3: The Ascent		Yes
2019	Backdraft 2	Yes	

=== Television ===
Year	Title	Director	Writer	Producer	Notes
1988	Weekend War		Yes	Co-producer	TV movie
1993	Space Rangers		Yes		Episode "The Replacements"
1993	Tales from the Crypt	Yes	Yes		Episode "Half-Way Horrible"
1999	Rescue 77		Yes	Executive	Also creator; Wrote 3 episodes
2000	Green Sails		Yes	Co-executive	TV movie
