= Joel Soisson =

American film director

- Education: Pratt Institute; University of Southern California; American Film Institute
- Occupations: Film director; film producer; screenwriter

Joel Soisson is an American filmmaker. He works primarily in the field of independent film. His numerous credits include Dracula 2000, A Nightmare on Elm Street 2: Freddy's Revenge, Bill & Ted's Excellent Adventure, The Prophecy, Little Pink House and Buffalo Rider.

== Biography ==
=== Education ===
Soisson studied fine arts and character animation at Pratt Institute and film studies at the University of Southern California and the American Film Institute.

=== Movie career ===
Soisson has written, produced and directed numerous feature films since producing Bill & Ted's Excellent Adventure (1989). He worked extensively with production companies such as New Line Cinema, De Laurentiis Entertainment Group and The Weinstein Company, before making films under his own banner, Neo Art & Logic, where he helped produce and finance Sweet Jane (1998) and the documentary feature Trekkies (1997).

Mr. Soisson was featured prominently in Season 3 of the reality television series, Project Greenlight, which chronicled the making of the horror film, Feast, directed by then-neophyte John Gulager. He is a longtime member of the Writers Guild of America.

=== Personal life ===
He currently lives in Bainbridge Island, Washington and works internationally. His wife, Claudia Templeton, is an actress and production accountant.

== Filmography ==
Film	Year	Role
The Triumphs of a Man Called Horse	1982	Production Assistant
Hambone and Hillie	1983	Screenplay, Associate Producer
A Nightmare on Elm Street 2: Freddy's Revenge	1985	2nd unit director (2nd Unit) Director, Line Producer
Avenging Angel	1985	Associate Producer
Lethal	1985	Associate Producer
The Witch	1985	Assistant Art Director
The Boys Next Door	1985	Associate Producer
The Supernaturals	1986	Producer, Writer
Trick or Treat	1986	2nd unit director (2nd Unit) Director, Producer, Screenplay
Bill & Ted's Excellent Adventure	1989	Producer
Modern Love	1990	Executive Producer
The Dave Thomas Comedy Show	1990	Producer
Blue Desert	1991	Executive Producer
Lower Level	1991	2nd unit director (2nd Unit) Director, Executive Producer, Screenplay
Maniac Cop III: Badge of Silence	1993	Producer
American Yakuza	1994	Executive Producer
Blue Tiger (TV)	1994	Executive Producer, Screenplay
Fist of the North Star (Video)	1995	Co-Executive Producer
The Prophecy	1995	Producer
Back to Back	1996	Executive Producer
Infinity	1996	Producer
No Way Back (TV)	1996	Producer
Countdown	1996	Producer
Drive (TV)	1997	Executive Producer
Slaves to the Underground	1997	Executive Producer
Trekkies	1997	Executive Producer
Phantoms	1998	Producer
The Prophecy II	1998	Producer
Suckers	1999	Executive Producer
Six Days in Roswell	1999	Executive Producer
Dracula 2000	2000	Producer, Writer
Highlander: Endgame	2000	Writer
Sweet Jane	2000	Executive Producer
The Prophecy 3: The Ascent	2000	Producer, Writer
Hellraiser: Inferno	2000	Producer
Children of the Corn: Revelation	2001	Producer
Mimic 2	2001	Writer
Dracula II: Ascension	2003	Producer, Writer
Dracula III: Legacy	2003	Producer, Writer
Trekkies 2	2004	Executive Producer
Feast	2005	Producer
Hellraiser: Hellworld	2005	Story by
The Prophecy: Forsaken	2005	Writer/Director
The Prophecy: Uprising	2005	Writer/Director
American Pie Presents: The Naked Mile	2006	Executive producer
Hollow Man 2	2006	Writer
Pulse	2006	Producer
Highlander: The Source	2007	Writer (as Mark Bradley)
Pulse 2: Afterlife	2008	Writer/Director
Pulse 3	2008	Writer/Director
Children of the Corn: Genesis	2011	Writer/Director
Hellraiser: Revelations	2011	Producer
Piranha 3DD	2012	Producer, Writer
White Frog	2012	Producer
Cam2Cam	2014	Writer/Director
Toonstone	2014	Executive Producer
Buffalo Rider	2015	Writer/Director
Girl Missing	2015	Director
Little Pink House	2017	Producer
Children of the Corn: Runaway	2018	Writer
Fatal Beauty	2019	Writer/Director
My Best Worst Adventure	2021	Writer/Director
Seven Cemeteries	2023	Producer, Screenplay
