= Deuteronomium - Der Tag des jüngsten Gerichts =

- DVD released by Swiss Independent Film
- Directed by: Roger Grolimund
- Written by: Roger Grolimund; Franziska Lehmann
- Story by: Roger Grolimund
- Produced by: Roger Grolimund
- Starring: Samuel Binkert; Denise Meili; Mario Scarpellini; Jürg Plüss; Mike Eggenschwiler; Tobias Durband
- Cinematography: Markus Tomsche
- Edited by: Eckart Zerzawy
- Music by: Martin Lutz
- Production company: Swiss Independent Film
- Distributed by: Swiss Independent Film
- Release date: 26 October 2004 (Switzerland)
- Running time: 62 minutes
- Country: Switzerland
- Language: Swiss German

Deuteronomium - Der Tag des jüngsten Gericht (English: Deuteronomy - The Day of Judgment) is a 2004 Swiss horror film written and directed by Roger Grolimund, and co-written by Franziska Lehmann. A direct-to-video release, it stars Samuel Binkert as Michael Luhser, a down on his luck loser who begins punishing sinners at the behest of an angel played by Denise Meili.

== Plot ==
Michael Luhser is a luckless misanthrope who lives alone in a squalid house in Olten. One day, Michael returns home from his dead-end office job, and is greeted by an angel, who claims that Michael has been chosen by Heaven to punish sinners in the name of God. While initially reluctant to believe the angel, Michael eventually goes out and murders a purse-snatching drug addict, and then a ruthless corporate raider named Gerhard Schmidt and Gerhard's wife, Daniela. After committing another double homicide, that of a dominatrix and her adulterous client, Michael becomes wracked with guilt, and leaves behind a message that reads, "Stop Me Please!" The angel alleviates Michael's doubts by having sex with him, and then has him gun down a greedy and unethical scientist named Doctor West.

While fleeing the scene of the crime, Michael is assaulted by a drunk, and aided by a woman named Sabine, who notices that Michael's bag is full of weapons, which causes her to realize that Michael is the so-called "Murderer of Olten." The angel has Michael drink her blood, and then orders him to kill Sabine. Michael slits Sabine's throat, and then goes out binge drinking before passing out at home, where he is awakened by the Police Commissioner. The Police Commissioner orders Michael to surrender, threatening to shoot him if he does not, but Michael instead shoots himself after sardonically declaring, "No, don't do it! Don't sin." Michael is sent to Hell, where the angel takes his form, and mockingly reveals to Michael that she is actually a demon, one who acted as a convenient "justification" for Michael's crimes, which the demon claims Michael committed simply because he wanted to, and not because he believed in God.

== Cast ==
- Samuel Binkert as Michael Luhser
- Denise Meili as Engel
- Tina Perger as Mutter
- Tobias Durband as Martin
- Angélique Wälchli as Moderatorin
- Sabrina Kühnis as Manuela Sewers
- Mike Eggenschwiler as Gerhard Schmidt
- Jürg Plüss as Doctor West
- Myriam Wittlin as Frau West
- David Schussegger as Junkie
- Anastasia L. Wieland as Opfer
- Roman Güttinger as Chef
- Mercedes Müller as Sarah
- Franziska Lehmann as Claudia/Kioskfrau
- Vesna Garstick as Martina S.
- Nadine Stampfli as Sandra
- Carina Grossen as Daniela Schmidt
- Michèle Hirsig as Freundin von Mutter
- Mario Scarpellini as Kommissar
- Dominik Lienhard as Schläger
- Sina Fabienne Bänziger as Sabine

== Release ==
The film was released direct-to-video by Swiss Independent Film on October 26, 2004, and was rereleased on DVD by Spasmo Video in June 2018.

== Reception ==
Deuteronomium was deemed an "above average" film that was technically competent and impressively gory, pros which offset shortcomings like its mediocre story and script, by Dennis Pelzer of Gory News. The film's "dream-like" atmosphere and Olaf Ittenbach's special effects were commended by Davide Di Giorgio of Sentieriselvaggi. Horror News also praised Olaf Ittenbach's gore effects, which they concluded were the only worthwhile aspect of the film, its potentially interesting plot having been squandered by inept execution; in summation, the website wrote, "I wanted so much for this movie to be good, at least along the lines of a Mario Bava/Lucio Fulci movie, something with some teeth in it that can make it a worthwhile watch for people who want to see good gore. And yeah, I guess, if that's all you're in it for, you can be in for a nice treat. You just have to ignore literally everything else in the movie, and you'll have a good time."

== See also ==
- List of films about angels
