= Sweet Jane (film) =

- Sweet Jane DVD cover
- Directed by: Joe Gayton
- Written by: Joe Gayton
- Produced by: Joel Soisson (executive); Michael Leahy (executive)
- Starring: Samantha Mathis; Joseph Gordon-Levitt
- Cinematography: Greg Littlewood
- Edited by: Jennifer Lane
- Music by: Walter Werzowa
- Distributed by: Overseas FilmGroup
- Release date: February 1, 1998
- Running time: 83 minutes
- Country: United States
- Language: English

Sweet Jane is a 1998 American drama about an unlikely friendship that develops between an HIV positive prostitute addicted to heroin and a terminally-ill fifteen-year-old boy. Sweet Jane was directed by Joe Gayton and stars Samantha Mathis as Jane and Joseph Gordon-Levitt as Tony. The film opened at the AFI Los Angeles Film Festival.

== Plot ==
Jane is a junkie who works as a prostitute to pay for her addiction. Tony is a 15-year-old boy, dying of AIDS, living in a hospital to minimize the severity of his illness. Having overdosed on heroin in an alley, Jane ponders on whether she should have regrets if she dies or make apologies as paramedics try to save her. She decides "fuck it", no regrets, but that "feels like [she] should be thinking of someone". The paramedics revive her and take her to the hospital. When she wakes up, the attending doctor (Kimberly Scott) informs Jane she is HIV positive.

In the same hospital, Tony is being lectured by a therapist about starting a fire in the game room and hiding his medication. The therapist insists Tony take his meds, and it is revealed he has pneumonia. Tony storms off, asking why it matters, as he will die anyway. Beginning to experience the symptoms of withdrawal, Jane leaves the hospital, passing by Tony's room. Tony sees her, instantly becomes infatuated, and follows her out into the streets. Jane eventually takes notice and tells Tony to stop following her. Jane goes to her usual dealer (Derek Webster) but he refuses to sell to her, despite her pleas and offer to trade sex for drugs. She then goes to a dance club, where she begs the owner to let her dance behind glass for the customers. Tony follows her in, without her knowledge. At the end of her dance, she is horrified to find Tony watching her from behind one of the booths. She collects her tips and leaves in a hurry to buy drugs from a dealer in an alley. High and unaware of reality, Jane wanders the streets, Tony behind her, watching over her. The next morning, Jane wakes up in a dusty field, Tony sitting beside her. Preparing to leave and hoping Tony will stay away from her, Jane finds vomit on her shirt and knows it will be harder to attract johns that way.

In a local department store, Jane is shifting through a rack and Tony appears. She orders him to leave, so it will not attract attention when she steals the blouse, but before he moves away, she asks him what color the shirt is, as she is colorblind. Annoyed, she shoves the blouse down the front of her pants but is caught by a floor manager. Tony distracts the security guard and manager by breaking a mirror and shouting, allowing both him and Jane to escape. Jane then begins to warm up to Tony. Over milkshakes, they talk about their families, Tony tells her his dad is gone and his mother drowned in a lake trying to save him. They then depart when Jane begins to itch for another fix. She tries to work at her usual corner, but her fellow prostitutes shoo her away because Dr. Gordon came around looking for her, informing them Jane has HIV. After a failed attempt at taking another hooker's purse, Jane encounters another prostitute, who is willing to help her. She gives Jane an address for a hotel where a sleazy wanna-be director is filming a porno, but will pay $250 for her services. Jane goes, finds the motel room filled with five men who will be on camera with her, and is about to go through with it, but changes her mind as the men hold her down and the director shouts at her to struggle more. Desperate now, Jane decides to rob a convenience store with a toy gun, but the attempt fails. Tony comes out and helps her escape, but not before Jane takes the money from the register. She goes back to her dealer, but after a long moment of just looking at one another, Jane reconsidering and thinking about what Tony said to her, Jane leaves.

Jane takes Tony back to her apartment, and orders him to tie her to a chair to keep her from hurting him, herself or getting a fix as she withdraws. After a few days, Jane wakes up on her bed, changed into clean clothes and a clean apartment. Tony has gotten progressively sicker since she passed out. The two begin to bond, Jane opening up about the happy family she came from, the college education she threw away for drugs and the lake where her family went every summer. After a news broadcast puts out a wanted message for Jane, and reveals that Tony is very sick, Jane finds out he has AIDS and decides to bring him back to the hospital. However, when she tries, Tony begs her not to let him die in there, to let him die with her. When Jane asks him why, he replies that it's because he loves her. They embrace and Jane knows she cannot bring him back to the hospital without hating herself.

Upon finding the police at her door, Jane and Tony flee to a 5-star hotel, where they have a fancy dinner date, dance and talk more about their lives. Jane tells Tony she has never been good with love, giving it or receiving it. Tony reveals to her that he lied about how his mother died. As it turns out, his father is in jail and his mother is dead, most likely by AIDS. He tells her his dad never loved him, but his mother did, just not as much as his father and that he got HIV from his father, hinting that his father sexually abused him. Horrified, Jane asks him if he wants to kill his father for what he has done, but Tony replies that he's probably already dead. Later that night, Tony and Jane make love.

By the morning, Tony's condition has deteriorated rapidly, and he asks her to take him to the lake where she spent her childhood. Jane steals a car from a john and begins driving herself and Tony to the far-off lake. Once there, Jane takes him out of the car, Tony deliriously thinking she is his mother. Jane humors him and brings him into a boat and paddles out. Tony begins to scream in pain, and not wanting him to suffer, Jane pulls out the heroin she bought from a dealer the night she and Tony had their date. She cooks it and injects it into his arm. Jane cries as Tony falls asleep, overdosing on the drug, and holds him close as they rock on the waters.

== Cast ==
=== Main cast ===
Name	Role	Notes
Samantha Mathis	Jane	
Joseph Gordon-Levitt	Tony	
Kimberly Scott	Dr. Gordon	
Derek Webster	Darryl	
Nicki Micheaux	Martielle	
William McNamara	Stan Bleeker	
Phil Fondacaro	Bob	

== Home video ==
The film was released on DVD on June 19, 2001, by Vanguard Cinema.
