= Uziel (angel) =

Archangel

Uziel (or Usiel) is an archangel mentioned in some variants of 3 Enoch (but Ouza in others), in a variant of Sefer Raziel HaMalakh, in Johannes Trithemius's Steganographia, and in John Milton's Paradise Lost.

== See also ==
- List of angels in theology

== Citations ==
- Alexander, P. (1983). "3 (Hebrew Apocalypse of) Enoch". In Charlesworth, James H. (ed.). The Old Testament Pseudepigrapha. Vol. I (Apocalyptic Literature and Testaments). New York: Doubleday.
- Davidson, Gustav (1967). A Dictionary of Angels: Including the Fallen Angels. New York: Free Press.
- Gettings, Fred (1988). Dictionary of Demons. London: Guild Publishing.
- Odeberg, Hugo (1928). 3 Enoch or The Hebrew Book of Enoch. Cambridge UP. 3Enoch
- Oliver, Evelyn Dorothy; Lewis, James R. (2008). Angels A to Z. Visible ink press. ISBN 9781578592289.
