= David C. Williams (film composer) =

American film composer

- Origin: United States
- Genres: Film scores
- Occupations: Composer, conductor
- Years active: 1979-present

David C. Williams is an American film composer.

== Career ==
Williams earned his Bachelor of Music degree from Southwest Missouri State University and his Master of Music from the University of North Texas College of Music, and took classes with Academy Award winning composer John Corigliano.

Williams worked on films, such as No Way Back, Supernova, Phantoms, and The Prophecy. The latter using a theme he created for all the film's sequels. He scored the action film Give 'Em Hell, Malone.
