= Puriel =

Angel in Judaism and Christianity

Puriel (also Pyriel, Puruel, Pusiel and Pyruel and Purel) is an angel who appears in the apocryphal work of the Testament of Abraham, the 2nd-century apocalyptic tale of Abraham's journey to heaven. Puriel is described as "fiery and pitiless," and is one of the two angels (along with Dokiel) charged with the task of examining the soul of each person brought to heaven after death.

== See also ==
- List of angels in theology
