= Steve Hytner =

American actor (born 1959)

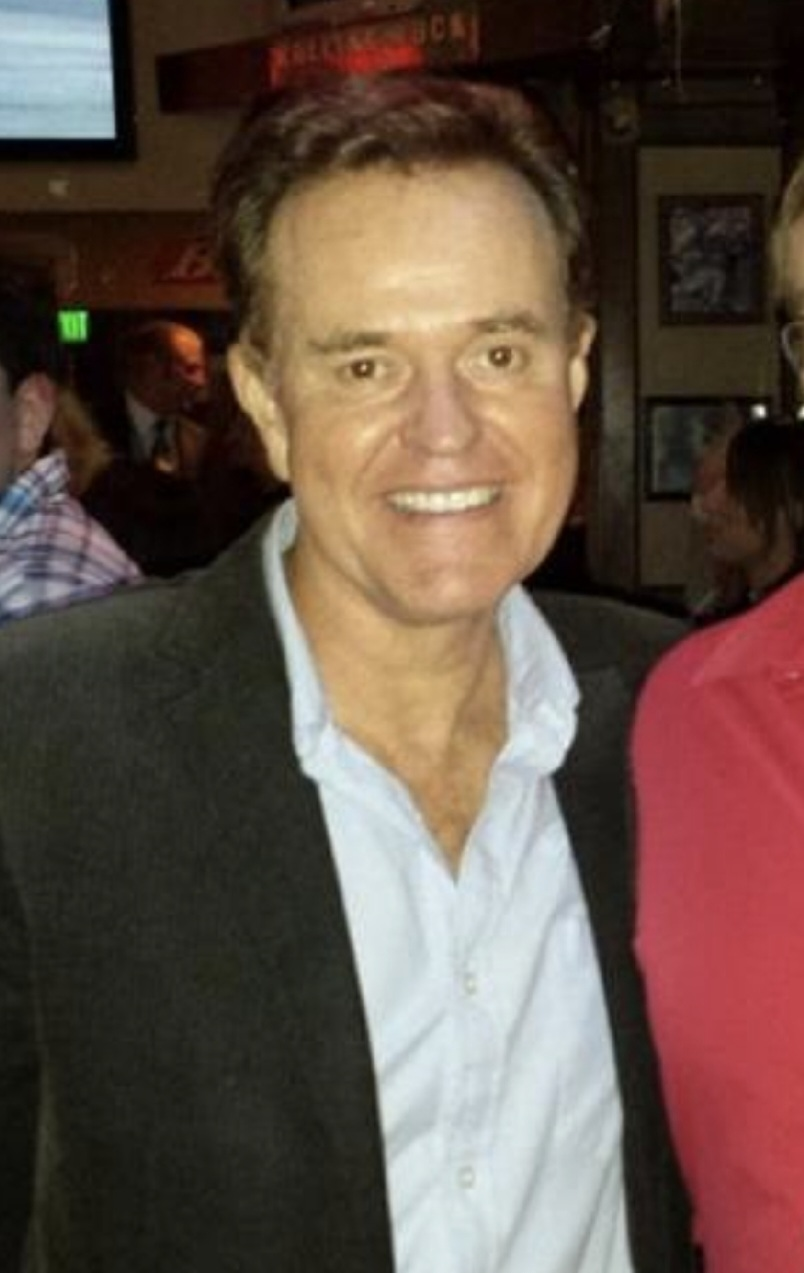
- Hytner in 2013
- Born: September 28, 1959 (age 67); New York City, U.S.
- Occupation: Actor
- Years active: 1990–present

Steve Hytner (/ˈhaɪtnər/; born September 28, 1959) is an American actor. He is perhaps best known for his role as Kenny Bania on the NBC series Seinfeld, and John Delaney in Working.

== Early life ==
Steve Hytner was born on September 28, 1959, in Brooklyn, New York City, and grew up on Long Island.

== Career ==
In 1979, Hytner joined the company of Lexington Conservatory Theatre in Lexington, NY, serving as a technical assistant. He soon appeared onstage in an intern performance of The Wager by Mark Medoff. His first professional on-stage appearance was a year later, in George M. Cohan's The Tavern, the debut production of Capital Repertory Theatre.

He appeared as a regular in The 100 Lives of Black Jack Savage, Hardball, and Working, in several episodes of Roswell, and also in occasional episodes of CSI: Crime Scene Investigation; one episode of Friends; and in The King of Queens, Two and a Half Men, Dharma & Greg, The X-Files, Lois & Clark: The New Adventures of Superman, That's So Raven, George Lopez, The Bill Engvall Show, The Jeff Foxworthy Show as Craig Lesko, and Mike & Molly. He portrays Ty Parsec in two episodes of The Adventures of Buzz Lightyear of Star Command (2000).

He performed in the Disney Channel Original Series The Suite Life of Zack & Cody as Herman Spatz, in Good Luck Charlie as Marvin the bellman, and in Sonny with a Chance as Murphy the troublesome security guard. He plays a motivational workshop instructor in the HBO series Hung.

Hytner has appeared in In the Line of Fire, Forces of Nature, and Eurotrip.

As Joseph the coroner, Hytner is one of two actors (the other being Christopher Walken) to appear in each of the first three films of The Prophecy series.

He appears in the 2006 comedy film Bachelor Party Vegas and reprised his role as Kenny Bania on the fictional Seinfeld reunion table read on Curb Your Enthusiasm in 2009. He was the Camp Superior counselor in the 2012 comedy film Fred 3: Camp Fred, and plays the role of client Roger Bodder in the comedy/thriller film Bad Vegan and the Teleportation Machine.

== Partial filmography ==
Year	Title	Role	Notes
1990	Ski Patrol	Myron	
1991	The Marrying Man	George	
1993	The Commish	Arlo Manno	Episode: "Stoned"
1993	The X-Files	Dr. Denny Murphy	Episode: "Ice"
1993	In the Line of Fire	Tony Carducci	
1994–1998	Seinfeld	Kenny Bania	7 episodes
1994	The Shadow	Marine Guard	
1995	The Prophecy	Joseph	
1997	Face/Off	Interrogating Agent	
1997–1998	Working	John Delaney	38 episodes
1999	Forces of Nature	Jack	
1999	Love Stinks	Marty Mark	
2000	Buzz Lightyear of Star Command	Ty Parsec	Voice, 2 episodes
2002	CSI: Crime Scene Investigation	Jonathan Claddon	Episode: "Cats in the Cradle..."
2003	Charlie's Angels: Full Throttle	Bathroom Guy	
2003	The Haunted Mansion	Mr. Silverman	
2004	EuroTrip	Absinthe Green Fairy	
2006	The Suite Life of Zack and Cody	Herman Spatz	Episode: "Commercial Breaks"
2006–2007	That's So Raven	Principal Stuckerman	2 episodes
2007	Totally Baked	Hack Murphy	Segment: "Mudslingers"
2008	Man Maid	Mean Developer	
2008	Soccer Mom	Coach Kenny	
2009	Curb Your Enthusiasm	Steve Hytner	Episode: "The Table Read"
2009	Tom Cool		
2010	Darnell Dawkins: Mouth Guitar Legend	Klaus	
2011	Good Luck Charlie	Marvin Starkwell	Episode: "Snow Show"
2011	About Fifty	Larry of Lumpy's	
2012	Should've Been Romeo	Rick	
2016	Bad Vegan and the Teleportation Machine	Roger Bodder	
2019	Extracurricular Activities	Gary Vaughn	
