= List of films released by Dimension Films =

The following is a complete list of films produced and/or distributed by American production and distribution company Dimension Films, a subsidiary of Lantern Entertainment, formerly owned by The Walt Disney Company under Miramax, and later by The Weinstein Company. Dimension Films began in 1992, and has produced and distributed numerous genre films, largely horror, sci-fi and action films. The company has owned the rights to, as well as produced and distributed, the films of several horror franchises, including the Scream films, the Children of the Corn series, the Hellraiser series and the Halloween films, among others.

Most films through October 1, 2005, are currently owned by Paramount Pictures via Miramax, while most films since October 1, 2005, are currently owned by Lantern Entertainment and Lionsgate via Spyglass Media Group.

In addition to distributing films for theatrical release, Dimension Films also released numerous titles direct-to-video. In 2008, the company introduced the Dimension Extreme division, a DVD label for "extreme" cinema, which mainly consisted of domestic and international horror titles.

+Key	Denotes standard theatrical release
†	Denotes release was direct-to-video
‡	Denotes television release
∈	Denotes home video release only under Dimension Extreme label

== 1990s ==
U.S. release date	Title	Production	Distribution	Notes	Ref.
September 11, 1992	Hellraiser III: Hell on Earth	No	Yes		
December 9, 1992 †	Godzilla vs. Biollante	No	Yes	original distributor of the film in the United States; produced by Toho Pictures	
January 29, 1993	Children of the Corn II: The Final Sacrifice	No	Yes		
July 9, 1993	The Legend	No	Yes	First film to be released by Dimension Films during their Disney tenure	
September 3, 1993	Fortress (Note: Co-owned by Alcon Entertainment)	No	Yes	North American distribution only; produced by Davis Entertainment and Village Roadshow Pictures	
February 4, 1994	Gunmen	No	Yes	North American distribution only; produced by Davis Entertainment	
March 18, 1994	Mother's Boys	Yes	No	Co-production with CBS Productions	
May 11, 1994	The Crow	Yes	No	North American distribution only	
May 13, 1994	The Evil Within	No	Yes		
January 27, 1995	Highlander III: The Final Dimension	No	Yes		
April 11, 1995 †	The Road Killers	Yes	No		
September 1, 1995	The Prophecy	No	Yes	distribution in the US, English-speaking Canada, UK, Ireland, Australian and New Zealand	
September 12, 1995 †	Children of the Corn III: Urban Harvest	No	Yes		
September 29, 1995	Halloween: The Curse of Michael Myers	No	Yes		
December 19, 1995 †	Men of War	No	Yes		
January 3, 1996 †	Best of the Best 3: No Turning Back	No	Yes		
January 19, 1996	From Dusk till Dawn	No	Yes	Co-production with A Band Apart and Los Hooligans Productions	
March 8, 1996	Hellraiser: Bloodline	No	Yes		
July 26, 1996	Supercop	No	Yes	Co-production with Media Asia Entertainment Group	
August 16, 1996	Supercop 2	No	Yes		
August 30, 1996	Crime Story	No	Yes		
August 30, 1996	The Crow: City of Angels	Yes	Yes	Co-production with Miramax Films	
September 17, 1996	The Shooter	No	Yes		
October 8, 1996 †	Children of the Corn IV: The Gathering	No	Yes		
November 29, 1996	Adrenalin: Fear the Rush	No	Yes	Co-production with Largo Entertainment and Filmwerks	
December 20, 1996	Scream	Yes	Yes	Co-production with Woods Entertainment	
February 28, 1997 †	Fist of Legend	No	Yes		
July 18, 1997	Operation Condor	No	Yes	Co-production with Media Asia Entertainment Group	
July 18, 1997	Operation Condor 2: The Armor of the Gods	No	Yes	Co-production with Media Asia Entertainment Group	
August 22, 1997	Mimic	Yes	Yes		
August 22, 1997	Nirvana	No	Yes		
December 3, 1997	Office Killer	No	Yes		
December 12, 1997	Scream 2	Yes	Yes	Co-production with Konrad Pictures	
December 16, 1997 †	Bounty Hunters	No	Yes		
January 20, 1998 †	The Prophecy II	Yes	Yes		
January 23, 1998	Phantoms	Yes	Yes		
February 20, 1998	Senseless	Yes	Yes	Co-production with Mandeville Films	
March 27, 1998	Ride	Yes	Yes		
April 17, 1998	Nightwatch	Yes	Yes		
May 12, 1998 ‡	Blackjack	No	Yes		
May 27, 1998	I Got the Hook-Up	No	Yes		
June 16, 1998 †	The Rage	No	Yes	distribution in the US only	
June 21, 1998 †	Children of the Corn V: Fields of Terror	No	Yes		
August 5, 1998	Halloween H20: 20 Years Later	Yes	Yes		
August 14, 1998	Air Bud: Golden Receiver	No	Yes	Co-production with Keystone Entertainment	
August 21, 1998 †	Break Up	No	Yes	distribution in the US, UK, Ireland, Australia and New Zealand only	
October 20, 1998 †	Best of the Best 4: Without Warning	No	Yes		
December 25, 1998	The Faculty	Yes	Yes	Co-production with Los Hooligans Productions	
March 16, 1999 †	From Dusk Till Dawn 2: Texas Blood Money	No	Yes	Co-production with A Band Apart and Los Hooligans Productions	
March 31, 1999	Beowulf	No	Yes	Co-production with The Kushner-Locke Company	
April 9, 1999	Twin Dragons	No	Yes	Co-production with Media Asia Entertainment Group and Distant Horizon	
April 23, 1999	eXistenZ	No	Yes	US and Latin American distribution only; produced by Alliance Atlantis and Serendipity Point Films	
August 3, 1999 †	Tale of the Mummy	No	Yes		
August 20, 1999	Teaching Mrs. Tingle	Yes	Yes		
August 25, 1999	In Too Deep	Yes	Yes		
October 19, 1999 †	Children of the Corn 666: Isaac's Return	No	Yes		

== 2000s ==
U.S. release date	Title	Production	Distribution	Notes	Ref.
January 18, 2000 †	From Dusk Till Dawn 3: The Hangman's Daughter	No	Yes	Co-production with A Band Apart and Los Hooligans Productions	
February 4, 2000	Scream 3	Yes	Yes		
February 25, 2000	Reindeer Games	Yes	Yes		
March 14, 2000 †	The Prophecy 3: The Ascent	Yes	Yes		
June 14, 2000 †	The Crow: Salvation (Note: Owned by Library Rights Company (UK), Ltd. and Zelus Film Holding Company, LLC, with distribution rights currently licensed to Resurgence Media Group, which has sub-licensed U.S. rights to Shout! Studios)	Yes	Yes		
June 16, 2000	Boys and Girls	Yes	Yes		
July 7, 2000	Scary Movie	Yes	Yes	Co-production with Wayans Bros. Entertainment, Gold/Miller Productions, Brad Grey Pictures	
September 1, 2000	Highlander: Endgame	Yes	Yes		
September 6, 2000	Backstage	Yes	Yes		
October 3, 2000 †	Hellraiser: Inferno	Yes	Yes		
October 20, 2000	Drunken Master II	No	Yes		
December 12, 2000 †	Air Bud: World Pup	No	No	Produced by Keystone Entertainment; distributed by Buena Vista Home Entertainment	
December 22, 2000	Dracula 2000	Yes	Yes		
March 30, 2001	Spy Kids	Yes	Yes	Co-production with Troublemaker Studios; Inducted into the National Film Registry in 2024	
April 17, 2001 †	The Proposal	No	Yes		
May 15, 2001 †	Bounty Hunters 2: Hardball	No	Yes		
July 4, 2001	Scary Movie 2	Yes	Yes	Co-production with Wayans Bros. Entertainment	
July 17, 2001 †	Mimic 2	Yes	Yes		
August 10, 2001	The Others (Note: Owned by StudioCanal, with U.S. distribution rights split between Rialto Pictures and Lionsgate)	Yes	Yes	Distribution in North and Latin America, the U.K., Ireland, Australia, New Zealand and South Africa only	
August 24, 2001	Jay and Silent Bob Strike Back	Yes	Yes		
August 31, 2001	O	Yes	No	Distributed by Lions Gate Films	
October 9, 2001 †	Children of the Corn: Revelation	No	Yes		
November 30, 2001	Texas Rangers	Yes	Yes		
January 4, 2002	Impostor	Yes	Yes		
March 12, 2002	Mexico City	No	Yes		
June 18, 2002 †	Air Bud: Seventh Inning Fetch	No	No	Produced by Keystone Family Pictures; distributed by Buena Vista Home Entertainment	
June 18, 2002 †	Beneath Loch Ness	No	Yes		
July 12, 2002	Halloween: Resurrection	Yes	Yes		
August 7, 2002	Spy Kids 2: The Island of Lost Dreams	Yes	Yes	Co-production with Troublemaker Studios	
August 13, 2002 †	The Accidental Spy	No	Yes	Distribution outside Asia only	
October 4, 2002	Scorcher	No	Yes		
October 11, 2002	Below	Yes	Yes		
October 15, 2002 †	Hellraiser: Hellseeker	No	Yes		
October 25, 2002	Paid in Full	No	Yes		
November 27, 2002	They	No	Yes	North American and Italian distribution only; co-production with Focus Features and Radar Pictures	
December 6, 2002	Equilibrium	Yes	Yes		
December 17, 2002 †	For the Cause	No	Yes	Original title: Final Encounter	
January 14, 2003 †	Tangled	No	Yes	U.S., Australian and New Zealand distribution only; produced by Tapestry Films and Myriad Pictures	
June 7, 2003 †	Dracula II: Ascension	No	Yes		
June 24, 2003 †	Air Bud: Spikes Back	No	No	Produced by Keystone Family Pictures; distributed by Buena Vista Home Entertainment	
July 25, 2003	Spy Kids 3-D: Game Over	Yes	Yes	Co-production with Troublemaker Studios	
July 26, 2003 †	Momentum	No	Yes		
August 22, 2003	My Boss's Daughter	Yes	Yes		
September 12, 2003	Once Upon a Time in Mexico	No	Yes	international theatrical distribution outside Japan and India only; co-production with Columbia Pictures and Troublemaker Studios	
September 22, 2003 †	The Hole	No	Yes	U.S. distribution only; produced by Pathé	
October 14, 2003 †	Mimic 3: Sentinel	No	Yes		
October 24, 2003	Scary Movie 3	Yes	Yes		
November 26, 2003	Bad Santa	Yes	Yes	Co-production with Triptych Pictures; rights licensed to Columbia TriStar Film Distributors International for Hispanic America, the U.K., Ireland, Australia, New Zealand, South Africa, France, Germany, Austria, Italy and Spain	
March 5, 2004	Starsky & Hutch	No	Yes	international distribution only; co-production with Warner Bros. Pictures	
September 17, 2004	Mr. 3000	Yes	No	Co-production with Touchstone Pictures and Spyglass Entertainment	
September 28, 2004 †	Track Down	Yes	Yes		
December 25, 2004	Darkness	Yes	Yes	distribution in North America, the U.K., Ireland, Australia, New Zealand and South Africa	
January 15, 2005 ‡	The I Inside	Yes	Yes		
February 25, 2005	Cursed	Yes	Yes	Co-production with Outerbanks Entertainment	
April 1, 2005	Sin City	Yes	Yes	Co-production with Troublemaker Studios	
April 15, 2005	The Amityville Horror	Yes	No	international distribution outside the U.K., Ireland, Australia, New Zealand, France, Germany, Austria and Japan only; co-production with Metro-Goldwyn-Mayer, Platinum Dunes and Radar Pictures	
April 26, 2005 †	The Nameless	No	Yes		
May 13, 2005	Mindhunters (Note: Distribution rights co-owned by Resurgence Media Group)	Yes	No	North American distribution only	
June 7, 2005 †	The Crow: Wicked Prayer	No	Yes		
June 7, 2005 †	Hellraiser: Deader	No	Yes		
June 7, 2005 †	The Prophecy: Uprising	Yes	Yes		
June 10, 2005	The Adventures of Sharkboy and Lavagirl in 3-D	Yes	Yes	North American distribution only; co-production with Columbia Pictures and Troublemaker Studios	
July 12, 2005 †	Dracula III: Legacy	Yes	Yes		
August 26, 2005	The Brothers Grimm	Yes	Yes	Co-production with Metro-Goldwyn-Mayer and Mosaic Media Group	
September 6, 2005 †	Hellraiser: Hellworld	No	Yes		
September 6, 2005 †	The Prophecy: Forsaken	Yes	Yes		
September 16, 2005	Venom	Yes	Yes	Co-production with Outerbanks Entertainment; last film to be released by Dimension during their Disney tenure before being sold to The Weinstein Company	
October 18, 2005	Curandero	Yes	Yes	Co-production with Rodriguez International Pictures	
December 25, 2005	Wolf Creek	No	Yes		
March 7, 2006 †	Den of Lions	No	Yes		
April 14, 2006	Scary Movie 4 (Note: International rights retained by Disney)	Yes	Yes	Co-production with Miramax Films	
May 2, 2006 †	Ritual	Yes	Yes	Co-production with RKO Pictures	
August 11, 2006	Pulse	Yes	Yes		
September 22, 2006	Feast	Yes	Yes		
September 29, 2006	School for Scoundrels	Yes	Yes	Co-distribution with Metro-Goldwyn-Mayer	
December 25, 2006	Black Christmas	Yes	No	Co-distribution with Metro-Goldwyn-Mayer	
January 30, 2007 †	The Gathering	No	Yes	distribution in North America, the U.K., Ireland, Australia, New Zealand, South Africa and Italy only	
April 6, 2007	Grindhouse (Planet Terror and Death Proof)	Yes	Yes	Co-production with Troublemaker Studios	
June 15, 2007 ∈	DOA: Dead or Alive	No	Yes	Released on DVD under Dimension Extreme label September 11, 2007	
June 22, 2007	1408	Yes	No	Co-production with Metro-Goldwyn-Mayer	
July 27, 2007	Who's Your Caddy?	Yes	Yes	Co-distribution with Metro-Goldwyn-Mayer; produced by Our Stories Films	
August 31, 2007	Halloween	Yes	No	Co-production with Metro-Goldwyn-Mayer	
September 11, 2007 ∈	Dirty Sanchez: The Movie	No	Yes		
September 25, 2007 ∈	Broken	No	Yes		
October 9, 2007 ∈	Black Sheep	No	Yes	Theatrical distribution by The Weinstein Company	
October 23, 2007 ∈	Buried Alive	No	Yes		
November 13, 2007 ∈	Welcome to the Jungle	No	Yes		
November 21, 2007	The Mist	Yes	No	Co-distribution with Metro-Goldwyn-Mayer	
February 5, 2008 ∈	Storm Warning	No	Yes	North American, Australian and New Zealand distribution only	
February 19, 2008 ∈	Nightmare Detective	No	Yes	North American, U.K., Irish, Australian and New Zealand distribution only	
March 4, 2008 ∈	Automaton Transfusion	No	Yes		
March 18, 2008 ∈	13: Game of Death	No	Yes		
March 28, 2008	Superhero Movie	Yes	Yes	Co-distribution with Metro-Goldwyn-Mayer	
April 15, 2008 ∈	Inside	No	Yes		
April 25, 2008 ∈	Rogue	Yes	Yes	Co-production with Village Roadshow Pictures and Emu Creek Pictures; released on DVD under Dimension Extreme label August 5, 2008	
May 6, 2008 ∈	Teeth	No	Yes		
May 20, 2008 ∈	Diary of the Dead	No	Yes	North American and Mexican distribution only	
May 20, 2008 ∈	Night of the Living Dead	No	Yes		
June 6, 2008	The Promotion	Yes	No		
July 1, 2008 ∈	Triloquist	No	Yes		
July 15, 2008 ∈	Steel Trap	No	Yes		
August 8, 2008 ∈	Hell Ride	Yes	Yes	Released on DVD under Dimension Extreme label October 28, 2008	
August 12, 2008 ∈	The Killing Gene	No	Yes	Original title: WΔZ; North American distribution only	
August 19, 2008 ∈	The Wizard of Gore	No	Yes		
August 22, 2008	The Longshots	Yes	No	Co-production with Metro-Goldwyn-Mayer	
September 23, 2008 ∈	Mother of Tears	No	Yes	North American distribution excluding theatrical and Canadian television only	
September 30, 2008 ∈	Pulse 2: Afterlife	Yes	Yes		
October 7, 2008 ∈	Feast II: Sloppy Seconds	Yes	Yes		
November 7, 2008	Soul Men	Yes	No	Co-production with Metro-Goldwyn-Mayer	
November 18, 2008 ∈	The Zombie Diaries	No	Yes		
December 5, 2008 ∈	Extreme Movie	No	Yes		
December 23, 2008 ∈	Pulse 3	Yes	Yes		
January 6, 2009 ∈	Eden Lake	No	Yes	North American distribution only	
January 20, 2009 ∈	King of the Hill	No	Yes	U.S. and Latin American distribution only	
February 17, 2009 ∈	Feast III: The Happy Finish	Yes	Yes		
March 3, 2009 ∈	Dead in 3 Days	No	Yes		
April 21, 2009 ∈	Dante 01	No	Yes	North American, Australian and New Zealand distribution only	
May 12, 2009 ∈	Kill Buljo	No	Yes	U.S., U.K., Irish, Australian and New Zealand distribution only	
August 28, 2009	Halloween II	Yes	Yes		
October 16, 2009	Janky Promoters	Yes	No		
November 25, 2009	The Road	No	Yes		

== 2010s ==
U.S. release date	Title	Production	Distribution	Notes	Ref.
January 8, 2010	Youth in Revolt	Yes	Yes		
February 9, 2010	Hurricane Season	Yes	No		
August 20, 2010	Piranha 3D	Yes	Yes		
April 15, 2011	Scream 4	Yes	Yes	Co-production with Corvus Corvax and Outerbanks Entertainment	
August 19, 2011	Spy Kids: All the Time in the World	Yes	Yes	Co-production with Troublemaker Studios	
August 30, 2011 ∈	Children of the Corn: Genesis	No	Yes		
September 2, 2011	Apollo 18	Yes	Yes		
September 23, 2011	Livid	No	Yes		
October 11, 2011 ∈	World of the Dead: The Zombie Diaries 2	No	Yes		
October 18, 2011 ∈	Hellraiser: Revelations	Yes	Yes		
June 1, 2012	Piranha 3DD	Yes	Yes		
February 22, 2013	Dark Skies	Yes	Yes	Co-production with Alliance Films and Blumhouse Productions	
April 12, 2013	Scary Movie 5	Yes	Yes		
May 10, 2013	Aftershock	Yes	Yes	Co-distribution with RADiUS-TWC	
June 21, 2013	Compulsion	No	Yes		
October 11, 2013	All the Boys Love Mandy Lane	No	Yes		
January 14, 2014	Penthouse North	No	Yes		
April 18, 2014	13 Sins	No	Yes	Co-distribution with RADiUS-TWC; Co-production with Blumhouse Productions	
August 22, 2014	Sin City: A Dame to Kill For	Yes	Yes		
October 31, 2014	Horns	No	Yes	Co-distribution with RADiUS-TWC	
February 27, 2015	Everly	No	Yes		
October 17, 2015	Kristy	No	Yes	Co-distribution with The Weinstein Company; Co-production with David Kirschner Productions	
June 17, 2016	Clown	Yes	Yes	Co-production with Cross Creek Pictures, PS 260, Vertebra Films, Zed Filmworks, Method Studios, and Dragonfly Entertainment	
July 29, 2016	Viral	Yes	Yes	Co-distribution with RADiUS-TWC; Co-production with Blumhouse Productions	
November 4, 2016	Army of One	Yes	No		
June 16, 2017	47 Meters Down	Yes	No	Distributed by Entertainment Studios	
October 10, 2017	Demonic	Yes	Yes		
October 28, 2017	Amityville: The Awakening	Yes	Yes	Co-distribution with RADiUS-TWC; Co-produced with Blumhouse Productions; last film to be fully distributed by the company	
February 13, 2018	Hellraiser: Judgment	Yes	No	Distributed by Lionsgate Films	
March 13, 2018	Children of the Corn: Runaway	Yes	No	Distributed by Lionsgate Films	
October 11, 2019	Polaroid	Yes	No	International co-distribution with Lantern Entertainment and 13 Films; distributed in the US by Vertical Entertainment; last film produced by Dimension Films following Weinstein's sexual harassments in October 2017	

== Television productions ==
Title	Network	Year(s)
Glory Days	The WB	2002
A Wrinkle in Time	ABC	2003
Cement Heads	A&E	2014
Scream	MTV	2015–2016
The Mist	Spike	2017
Spy Kids: Mission Critical	Netflix	2018

== See also ==
- Dimension Films
- The Weinstein Company
- Miramax Films

== Works cited ==
- Craddock, James (2006a). The Video Source Book. Listings A-I (36th ed.). Thomas Gale. ISBN 978-0-787-68977-3.
- Craddock, James (2006b). The Video Source Book. Listings J–T (36th ed.). Thomas Gale. ISBN 978-0-787-68978-0.
- Craddock, James (2008). The Video Source Book. Vol. 1 (39th ed.). Thomson Gale. ISBN 978-1-414-40100-3.
- Francis, James Jr. (2013). Remaking Horror: Hollywood's New Reliance on Scares of Old. McFarland. ISBN 978-0-786-47088-4.
- Lázaro-Reboll, Antonio (2014). Spanish Horror Film. University of Edinburgh Press. ISBN 978-0-748-63639-6.
- Perren, Alisa (2012). Indie, Inc.: Miramax and the Transformation of Hollywood in the 1990s. University of Texas Press. ISBN 978-0-292-74287-1.
- Aldama, Frederick Luis (2014). The Cinema of Robert Rodriguez. University of Texas Press. p. 113. ISBN 978-0-292-76124-7.
- Riggs, Thomas (2004). Contemporary Theatre, Film and Television. Cengage Gale. ISBN 978-0-787-67101-3.
