= COTC =

COTC may stand for:

- Canadian Officers' Training Corps, Canada's university officer training programme
- Canadian Overseas Telecommunication Corporation, former name of VSNL International Canada
- Car of the Century, an international award given to the most influential car of the Twentieth Century
- Central Ohio Technical College, public two-year technical college based in Newark, Ohio, United States
- Children of the Corn (disambiguation)
  - "Children of the Corn", a 1977 short story by Stephen King
  - Children of the Corn (film series), film series began with Children of the Corn, released in 1984
    - Children of the Corn (1984 film), the 1984 film derived from the aforementioned story
    - Children of the Corn (2009 film), 2009 made-for-television remake of the 1984 film
  - Children of the Corn (album), an album by Sopor Æternus & the Ensemble of Shadows
  - Children of the Corn (group), 1990's hip-hop group
  - "Children of the Korn", a song by Korn
- Church of the Creator (New Age movement), a Christian-based faith organization in Ashland, Oregon, United States
- Church of the Creator, a white supremacist religion
- Clash of the Champions, a semi-annual professional wrestling event held by the National Wrestling Alliance and later World Championship Wrestling
- Craig of the Creek, a Cartoon Network TV series
- Corn on the cob, a culinary term for a cooked ear of corn
- Core of the Core, an oil and gas term for the geologic sweet spot in the center of the center of a desired area of interest.
