= Children of the Corn (disambiguation) =

Children of the Corn may refer to:

- "Children of the Corn", the short story
- Children of the Corn (film series), film series began with Children of the Corn, released in 1984
  - Children of the Corn (1984 film), the 1984 film derived from the aforementioned story
    - Children of the Corn II: The Final Sacrifice
    - Children of the Corn III: Urban Harvest
    - Children of the Corn IV: The Gathering
  - Children of the Corn (2009 film), 2009 made-for-television remake of the 1984 film
  - Children of the Corn (2020 film), a 2020 prequel to the 1984 film
- Children of the Corn (group), a New York City hip-hop group
- Children of the Corn (album), an album by Sopor Aeternus
- "Children of the Korn," a song by Korn from its 1998 album Follow the Leader
