= Children of the Corn (film series) =

Film series based on the short story by Stephen King

- Official film series logo
- Created by: Stephen King
- Original work: Children of the Corn (1977)

Films and television
- Films: List of films
- Short film: Disciples of the Crow

Children of the Corn is an American film series based on the Stephen King's short story "Children of the Corn" (1977). The series began with Children of the Corn, released in 1984 by New World Pictures. After the release of Children of the Corn II: The Final Sacrifice (1992) and the series' acquisition by Dimension Films, the subsequent installments were released directly to video, and bore little to no narrative continuity, beginning with Children of the Corn III: Urban Harvest (1995). In 2009, a second adaptation of the short story aired on the Syfy network, via Fox 21 Television. A third adaptation of the short story and a reboot also titled Children of the Corn (2020), was released on October 23, 2020.

== Films ==
Film	U.S. release date	Director(s)	Screenwriter(s)	Producer(s)	Distributor
Original series
Children of the Corn	March 9, 1984	Fritz Kiersch	George Goldsmith	Donald P. Borchers and Terence Kirby	New World Pictures
Children of the Corn II: The Final Sacrifice	January 29, 1993	David Price	A. L. Katz and Gilbert Adler	Scott A. Stone and David G. Stanley	Dimension Films
Children of the Corn III: Urban Harvest	September 12, 1995	James D. R. Hickox	Dode B. Levenson	Brad Southwick and Gary DePew	Dimension Films
Children of the Corn IV: The Gathering	October 8, 1996	Greg Spence	Stephen Berger and Greg Spence	Gary DePew and Jake Eberle	Dimension Films
Children of the Corn V: Fields of Terror	June 21, 1998	Ethan Wiley	Ethan Wiley	Jeff Geoffray and Walter Josten	Dimension Films
Children of the Corn 666: Isaac's Return	October 19, 1999	Kari Skogland	Tim Sulka and John Franklin	Bill Berry, Jeff Geoffray and Walter Josten	Dimension Films
Children of the Corn: Revelation	October 9, 2001	Guy Magar	S. J. Smith	Joel Soisson and Michael Leahy	Dimension Films
Remake
Children of the Corn	September 26, 2009	Donald P. Borchers	Donald P. Borchers and Stephen King	Donald P. Borchers	Fox 21 Television Studios
Reboot series
Children of the Corn: Genesis	August 30, 2011	Joel Soisson	Joel Soisson	Aaron Ockman and Joel Soisson	Dimension Extreme
Children of the Corn: Runaway	March 13, 2018	John Gulager	Joel Soisson	Michael Leahy	Lionsgate Films
Second reboot
Children of the Corn	October 23, 2020 (Sarasota); March 3, 2023	Kurt Wimmer	Kurt Wimmer	John Baldecchi, Doug Barry and Lucas Foster	RLJE Films; Shudder

== Short film ==
Film	U.S. release date	Director	Screenwriter	Producer(s)
Disciples of the Crow	1983	John Woodward	John Woodward	Johnny Stevens and John Woodward

== Cast and crew ==
=== Principal cast ===
Key
- A ^{V} indicates the actor lent only their voice for their film character.
- A ^{C} indicates a cameo appearance.
- A dark gray cell indicates the character was not in the film.

Characters	Films											
Characters	Short film	Original series							Remake	Reboot series		Second reboot
Characters	Disciples of the Crow	Children of the Corn	Children of the Corn II: The Final Sacrifice	Children of the Corn III: Urban Harvest	Children of the Corn IV: The Gathering	Children of the Corn V: Fields of Terror	Children of the Corn 666: Isaac's Return	Children of the Corn: Revelation	Children of the Corn	Children of the Corn: Genesis	Children of the Corn: Runaway	Children of the Corn
Characters	1983	1984	1992	1995	1996	1998	1999	2001	2009	2011	2018	2020
Burt	Gabriel Folse	Peter Horton							David Anders			
Vicky	Eleese Lester	Linda Hamilton							Kandyse McClure			
Isaac		John Franklin					John Franklin		Preston Bailey			
Malachai		Courtney Gains							Daniel Newman		Blaine Maye	
Rachel		Julie Maddalena					Nancy Allen					
Ruth			Kristy Angell						Alexa Nikolas		Marci Miller	

== Production ==
=== Development ===
Based on the short story by Stephen King, the first Children of the Corn film follows a couple who are besieged by mysterious children in a small town called Gatlin, Nebraska. Its first sequel begins immediately after the events of the original, and focuses on a reporter and his son who are investigating the events of the first film.

Beginning with the third installment, Dimension elected to produce standalone films that were not necessarily narratively connected. The third film follows two brothers from Gatlin who are forced into foster care in Chicago; the younger brother, under the influence of He Who Walks Behind the Rows, begins to grow corn in an abandoned lot behind his new family home, wreaking havoc. The fourth film returns to a rural Nebraska town where a young medical student attempts to uncover a mysterious illness striking the children of her hometown; the fifth film follows a group of young people who encounter the children, led by a man, Ezekiel, of He Who Walks Behind the Rows, when staying overnight in an abandoned farmhouse.

Part six follows a woman, born of the cult from the first film, who returns to Gatlin to uncover the identity of her birth mother, while the seventh installment focuses on a woman who travels to a small town outside Omaha to investigate the disappearance of her grandmother; there, she encounters bizarre children in the fields surrounding her grandmother's apartment building.

The 2009 remake follows the general plot of the first film, focusing on a couple who encounter the children in Gatlin. The ninth film, Genesis, follows a couple who lodge with a mysterious preacher in the California desert, who appears to be leading a bizarre cult.

== Releases ==
The first Children of the Corn (1984) was distributed by New World Pictures, receiving a theatrical release in the spring 1984. Its sequel, The Final Sacrifice (1992), was acquired for distribution by Miramax, and was released theatrically in January 1993 under Miramax's Dimension Films division.

After Dimension's release of Children of the Corn II: The Final Sacrifice, the company would acquire rights to the series and would release numerous follow-up sequels directly to video, beginning with Children of the Corn III: Urban Harvest, released in 1995. After the release of Revelation in 2001, a television remake of the original film was commissioned by Dimension, but ultimately distributed via Fox 21 Television Studios, airing on the Syfy channel in 2009.

In 2011, the ninth installment, Genesis, was released direct-to-video under Dimension's Extreme label.

=== Box office performance ===
Film	U.S. release date	Budget	Box office revenue (USD)	Notes	Ref.
Original series
Children of the Corn (1984)	March 9, 1984	$3,000,000	$14,568,989	—N/a	
Children of the Corn II: The Final Sacrifice	January 29, 1993	$1,300,000	$6,980,986	—N/a	
Children of the Corn III: Urban Harvest	September 12, 1995	—N/a	—N/a	Direct-to-video	—N/a
Children of the Corn IV: The Gathering	October 8, 1996	—N/a	—N/a	Direct-to-video	—N/a
Children of the Corn V: Fields of Terror	June 21, 1998	—N/a	—N/a	Direct-to-video	—N/a
Children of the Corn 666: Isaac's Return	October 19, 1999	—N/a	—N/a	Direct-to-video	—N/a
Children of the Corn: Revelation	October 9, 2001	—N/a	—N/a	Direct-to-video	—N/a
Remake
Children of the Corn (2009)	September 26, 2009	—N/a	—N/a	Television film	—N/a
Reboot series
Children of the Corn: Genesis	August 30, 2011	—N/a	—N/a	Direct-to-video	—N/a
Children of the Corn: Runaway	March 13, 2018	—N/a	—N/a	Direct-to-video	—N/a
Second reboot
Children of the Corn (2020)	October 23, 2020 (Sarasota); March 3, 2023	$10,000,000	$575,179	—N/a	
Total		$14,300,000	$22,125,154	—N/a	—N/a

=== Critical reception ===
Film	Rating	
Film	Rotten Tomatoes	Metacritic
Children of the Corn (1984)	39% (33 reviews)	45
Children of the Corn II: The Final Sacrifice	30% (10 reviews)	18
Children of the Corn III: Urban Harvest	—N/a	—N/a
Children of the Corn IV: The Gathering	—N/a	—N/a
Children of the Corn V: Fields of Terror	14% (7 reviews)	—N/a
Children of the Corn 666: Isaac's Return	0% (6 reviews)	—N/a
Children of the Corn: Revelation	0% (5 reviews)	—N/a
Children of the Corn (2009)	0% (7 reviews)	—N/a
Children of the Corn: Genesis	—N/a	—N/a
Children of the Corn: Runaway	—N/a	—N/a
Children of the Corn (2020)	12% (58 reviews)	22

== Home media ==
The entire series has been released on various home media formats. While all eleven of the films have been released on DVD, only the first seven films were released on VHS before the format was phased out. Additionally, Children of the Corn (1984), Children of the Corn III: Urban Harvest, Children of the Corn IV: The Gathering, Children of the Corn V: Fields of Terror, Children of the Corn 666: Isaac's Return, Children of the Corn (2009), Children of the Corn: Genesis, Children of the Corn: Runaway and Children of the Corn (2020) have been made available on Blu-ray disc.

== See also ==
- List of Dimension Films films

== Works cited ==
- Caputo, Marcello Gagliani (2016). Guide to the Cinema of Stephen King. Babelcube. ISBN 978-1-507-16438-9.
- Perren, Alisa (2012). Indie, Inc.: Miramax and the Transformation of Hollywood in the 1990s. University of Texas Press. ISBN 978-0-292-74287-1.
