= Children of the Corn (1984 film) =

1984 horror film by Fritz Kiersch

- Original 1984 theatrical release poster
- Directed by: Fritz Kiersch
- Screenplay by: George Goldsmith
- Based on: "Children of the Corn" by Stephen King
- Produced by: Donald P. Borchers; Terence Kirby
- Starring: Peter Horton; Linda Hamilton
- Cinematography: João Fernandes (as Raoul Lomas)
- Edited by: Harry Keramidas
- Music by: Jonathan Elias
- Production companies: Angeles Entertainment Group, Inc.; Hal Roach Studios; Inverness Productions, Inc.; New World Pictures; Gatlin Productions
- Distributed by: New World Pictures
- Release date: March 9, 1984
- Running time: 92 minutes
- Country: United States
- Language: English
- Budget: $3 million
- Box office: $14.6 million

Children of the Corn (advertised as Stephen King's Children of the Corn) is a 1984 American supernatural slasher film based on Stephen King's 1977 short story of the same name. Directed by Fritz Kiersch, the film's cast consists of Peter Horton, Linda Hamilton, John Franklin, Courtney Gains, Robby Kiger, Anne Marie McEvoy, Julie Maddalena and R. G. Armstrong. Set in the fictitious rural town of Gatlin, Nebraska, the film tells the story of a malevolent entity referred to as "He Who Walks Behind the Rows" which entices the town's children to ritually murder all the town's adults, as well as Burt Stanton and Vicky Baxter, a couple driving across the country, to ensure a successful corn harvest.

King wrote the original draft of the screenplay, which focused more on the characters of Burt and Vicky and depicted more history on the uprising of the children in Gatlin. This script was disregarded in favor of George Goldsmith's screenplay, which featured more violence and a more conventional narrative structure. Filming took place mainly in Iowa but also in California. It spawned a franchise of films, and it has inspired the rap group with the same name.

Children of the Corn was released theatrically on March 9, 1984, to mixed reviews from critics.

== Plot ==
Gatlin, Nebraska is an agricultural community surrounded by huge cornfields. When the corn crop fails one year, the townsfolk turn to prayer to ensure a successful harvest. However, nine-year-old Isaac Chroner takes all of the Gatlin children into the cornfields and indoctrinates them into a religious cult based around a bloodthirsty deity called "He Who Walks Behind the Rows". Isaac and his subordinate Malachai Boardman lead the children in a revolution, murdering all of the adults in town as human sacrifices. Siblings Job and Sarah Gilman are uninvolved in the sacrifices, having not attended the meetings with the other children.

Three years later, Vicky Baxter and her husband Burt Stanton travel through rural Nebraska on their way to Seattle, where Burt will start work as a physician. A young boy named Joseph tries to flee Gatlin but is attacked in the corn; he stumbles out into the road and Burt accidentally runs over him. However, Burt discovers that his throat was cut beforehand. Searching for help, the couple finds Chester Diehl, an elderly mechanic and the last adult in Gatlin. He refuses them service, as he has agreed to supply the children with fuel in exchange for his life. Malachai breaks the pact and murders him after Diehl tries to steer the couple away from Gatlin.

Vicky and Burt explore the abandoned town and find Sarah alone in a house. Malachai and his followers capture Vicky and take her to the cornfield, where they place her on a cross to be sacrificed. Burt enters the church, where a congregation of children led by a girl named Rachel Stigman are performing a cultural birthday ritual for Amos Deigan by drinking his blood from a pentagram-shaped cut on his body. Amos has turned 19, so is considered old enough for his "passing"—joining their god in the cornfield. Rachel stabs Burt, who is rescued by Job. They hide in a fallout shelter with Sarah.

Isaac scolds Malachai for killing Diehl, their only source of fuel. Malachai takes over, tired of Isaac's preaching, and orders Isaac to be sacrificed instead of Vicky. Isaac warns that sacrificing him will break their pact with He Who Walks Behind the Rows and the children will be punished. That night, Burt sneaks into the cornfield to rescue Vicky. During Isaac's sacrifice, a supernatural light appears and devours him. Burt overpowers Malachai and convinces the children to abandon the cult and run. Suddenly, the walking corpse of Isaac returns to punish Malachai. Informing him in a demonic voice that "He wants you, too", Isaac kills Malachai by choking him and breaking his neck.

A storm appears, and Burt and Vicky shelter the children in a barn. Reading from Job's Bible, Vicky realizes that the cornfield must be destroyed by fire in order to stop the false god. Burt tosses a Molotov cocktail into the field, setting it alight and destroying the demon along with Isaac. The couple returns to the car with Job and Sarah to leave Gatlin, but find it disabled. Rachel attacks Burt, but Vicky knocks her out and they depart with the children on foot.

== Cast ==
- Peter Horton as Burt
- Linda Hamilton as Vicky
- R. G. Armstrong as Diehl
- John Franklin as Isaac
- Courtney Gains as Malachai
- Robby Kiger as Job
- Anne Marie McEvoy as Sarah
- Julie Maddalena as Rachel
- Jonas Marlowe as Joseph
- John Philbin as Amos

== Production ==
Stephen King wrote the initial screenplay which was first optioned by Maine based director Harry Wiland and producer Joseph Masefield who arranged financing from Home Box Office and 20th Century Fox until Fox pulled out of the deal leaving the project $2 million short of the needed funds and causing the rights to be repeatedly brokered to the point King couldn't actually name all the entities that held the rights. Eventually, Hal Roach Studios acquired the rights and hired George Goldsmith to perform a re-write of King's script. One of the drafts eventually made its way to Donald P. Borchers, Vice President of Production and Creative Affairs at New World Pictures, and a deal was quickly made between New World and Hal Roach Studios before the corn in the Midwestern United States could ripen and hired director Fritz Kiersch and Terence Kirby as director and producer respectively.

Hal Roach executives did not want to use King's script and George Goldsmith was hired to rewrite it. Goldsmith said that King's script started with 35 pages of Burt Stanton and Vicky Baxter arguing in a car, so he decided to tell the story visually through the eyes of two new characters, children Job and Sarah Gilman. King was unhappy with the changes but Hal Roach went with Goldsmith. King and Goldsmith debated Goldsmith's approach during a phone conversation during which King argued that Goldsmith did not understand the horror genre and Goldsmith countered that King did not recognize that film is a visual, "external" experience unlike novels and short stories, which are "internal" and only visual in the reader's mind. The film was shot in Hornick, Iowa, Whiting, Iowa, Salix, Iowa and Sergeant Bluff, Iowa. Shooting began on September 7, 1983, in Whiting, Iowa, and finished in October 1983.

Goldsmith credited King with being extremely gracious when asked about the film in media interviews, stating in diplomatic ways he felt the new approach to be lacking. Hal Roach eventually sold the project to New World Pictures, which decided to go with Goldsmith's script, although it tried unsuccessfully to remove his name from the credits in favor of King's. After release of the highly successful film, Goldsmith revealed that much of the story was a metaphor for the Iranian Revolution, with the takeover of the town by quasi-religious zealots acting for an evil "God" based on the Ayatollah Ruhollah Khomeini and his revolutionary guard taking over Iran. Burt and Vicky became analogous to the American hostages and Goldsmith was using a horror film to expose the dangers and evils of religious fundamentalism, something few critics recognized.

During an interview on The Ghost of Hollywood, Fritz Kiersch explained how Courtney Gains won the role of Malachai Boardman by using a prop knife to hold a casting assistant hostage at the audition. Gains claims that one of the great honors of his career is having hundreds of people, even his son Jahi's friends, recognize him as Malachai and confess they found him terrifying, some having admitted his performance gave them nightmares. Apparently, even his own parents were greatly unnerved by him in this film.

According to producer Borchers, the film was originally offered to Sam Raimi to direct but Raimi wanted more preparation time. Borchers then offered the film to Tommy Lee Wallace who turned it down. He eventually went with Fritz Kiersch who worked in advertising. Because of seasonal changes, cornstalks had to be propped up and painted green to appear living. Some of the local townspeople also performed as minor roles or acted as extras in the film.

== Reception ==
=== Critical response ===
On the review aggregator website Rotten Tomatoes, Children of the Corn holds a 38% approval rating based on 34 critic reviews. The consensus reads: "Children of the Corn's strong premise and beginning gets shucked away for a kiddie thriller that runs in circles". On Metacritic, which assigns a rating to reviews, the film has a weighted average score of 45 out of 100, based on six critics, indicating "mixed or average" reviews. Audiences polled by CinemaScore gave the film an average grade of “D+” on an A+ to F scale.

Roger Ebert from the Chicago Sun Times awarded the film one out of four stars, writing: "By the end of Children of the Corn, the only thing moving behind the rows is the audience, fleeing to the exits". Vincent Canby of The New York Times wrote: "As such movies go, Children of the Corn is fairly entertaining, if you can stomach the gore and the sound of child actors trying to talk in something that might be called farmbelt biblical". Ian Nathan from Empire gave the film three out of five stars, commending its originality, but criticized its obvious budgetary constraints, poor effects and "ludicrous monster movie denouement". TV Guide awarded the film 1/5 stars, calling it "lame", and criticized the film's "gratuitous visual style". Rolling Stone ranked the film at No. 7 in its list of "Top 30 Stephen King Movies", calling it "a lean, brutally tense slasher film".

== Sequels and remakes ==
A sequel, Children of the Corn II: The Final Sacrifice, was released in 1992, kicking off a franchise that has reached six sequels as of 2026. A soft reboot to the film series, Children of the Corn: Genesis (2011), was followed by its own sequel, Children of the Corn: Runaway (2018).

In 2008, Donald P. Borchers began to write and direct a TV remake of the first film, to premiere on the Syfy channel. Production began in August, filming in Davenport, Iowa, but was later moved to Lost Nation, Iowa. The cast includes David Anders, Kandyse McClure, Preston Bailey, Daniel Newman and Alexa Nikolas. The film aired on September 26, 2009 and the DVD was released on October 6 by Anchor Bay. The film closely follows the original storyline present in the short story and not that of the original film.

A second film adaptation was written and directed by Kurt Wimmer and stars Elena Kampouris, Kate Moyer, Callan Mulvey and Bruce Spence. It was filmed in Australia during the COVID-19 pandemic. The film premiered in Sarasota, Florida on October 23, 2020 and was released in theaters on March 3, 2023. This version uses elements of the original story but different characters.

== See also ==
- Disciples of the Crow – 1983 American short film directed by John Woodward
- Beware! Children at Play (1989)
- Who Can Kill a Child? (1976)
