= Stephen King Goes to the Movies =

Book by Stephen King

- First edition
- Author: Stephen King
- Language: English
- Genre: Short-story collection
- Publisher: Hodder Staughton
- Publication date: January 20, 2009
- Publication place: United States
- Media type: Print (paperback)
- Pages: 592
- ISBN: 9780340980309

Stephen King Goes to the Movies is a short-story collection by Stephen King, first published on January 20, 2009. It contains five previously published King stories that were subsequently adapted into films, each with a new introduction by the author.

In an appendix, King lists his ten favorite film adaptations of his work.

== Stories ==
Title	Previously collected in	Filmed as
"1408"	Everything's Eventual (2002)	1408 (2007)
"The Mangler"	Night Shift (1978)	The Mangler (1995)
"Low Men in Yellow Coats"	Hearts in Atlantis (1999)	Hearts in Atlantis (2001)
"Rita Hayworth and Shawshank Redemption"	Different Seasons (1982)	The Shawshank Redemption (1994)
"Children of the Corn"	Night Shift (1978)	Children of the Corn (1984)
