= Brent Jennings =

American actor (born 1951)

- Born: April 13, 1951 (age 75); Little Rock, Arkansas, U.S.
- Occupation: Actor
- Years active: 1980–present

Brent Jennings (born April 13, 1951) is an American actor. He was born in Little Rock, Arkansas, and is a 1969 graduate of Little Rock Central High School.

He played Oakland Athletics coach Ron Washington in the 2011 film Moneyball, where he was a standout due to his deadpan delivery and humor,played supporting character Ernie, traveling plumbing salesman in the short-lived, but acclaimed AMC television series Lodge 49 and currently stars in the TV series All American.

== Filmography ==
=== Film ===
Year	Title	Role	Notes
1980	Brubaker	Mr. Clarence	as Brent N. Jennings
1982	Alone in the Dark	Ray Curtis	
1984	Fear City	Hawker#1	
1985	Witness	Sgt. Elton Carter	
1988	The Serpent and the Rainbow	Louis Mozart	
1988	Kansas	Buckshot	
1988	Red Heat	Abdul Elijah	
1990	Another 48 Hrs.	Tyrone Burroughs	
1992	Nervous Ticks	Cole	
1992	Live Wire	Shane Rogers	
1996	Children of the Corn IV: The Gathering	Donald	direct to video
1997	Little Boy Blue	Tom	
1998	Where's Marlowe?	Funeral Director	
1999	Life	Hoppin' Bob	
1999	Blue Ridge Fall	Jack Crow	
2004	Gas	Mr. Garrison	
2007	Honeydripper	Ned	
2010	My Girlfriend's Back	Geoff	
2011	Moneyball	Ron Washington	
2013	Go for Sisters	Dixon	

=== Television ===
Year(s)	Title	Role	Notes
1982	American Playhouse	First Man at Barbecue	Episode : "For Colored Girls Who Have Considered Suicide When the Rainbow Is Enuf"
1983	Murder in Coweta County	Robert Lee Gates	TV film
1984–1988	Miami Vice	T-Bone	3 episodes
1985–1986	Hill Street Blues		Season 6: 2 episodes
1986	The George McKenna Story	Mr. Jackson	TV film
1987–1989	Hunter	Curtis Brown	3 episodes
1988	The Murder of Mary Phagan	Newt Lee	TV miniseries
1990	The Antagonists	ADA Marvin Thompson	Unknown episodes
1991–1992	Brooklyn Bridge	Mr Greer	4 episodes
1992	A Child Lost Forever	Clayton Robinson	TV film
1993	Where I Live		3 episodes
1994	Pointman	Peter Dembrowski	TV film
1995	Shadow of a Doubt	Little Mike	TV film
1996	Soul of the Game	Frank Duncan	TV film
1996	American Gothic	Yancy Lydon	Episode : "The Buck Stops Here"
1997	Buffy the Vampire Slayer	Absalom	Season 2: Episode : "When She Was Bad"
1997	Don King: Only in America	Dick Sadler	TV film
1999	Love Songs	Bunchie	TV film (segment "Love Song for Jean and Ellis, A")
1999	A Lesson Before Dying	Rev. Ambrose	TV film
1997–2000	ER	Nat	3 episodes
2000	Dancing in September	Matt	TV film
2001	Boycott	Rufus Lewis	TV film
2005–2007	Medium	Wayne	3 episodes
2007	Grey's Anatomy	Charles Redford	Episode: "Time After Time"
2010	Meet the Browns	Racist Patient	Episode: "Meet the Racist"
2011–2016	Shameless	Principal Monroe	2 episodes
2012	Political Animals	Bill	TV miniseries
2016	Murder in the First	Hal Woodward / Barber	2 episodes
2016	Modern Family	Shawn	1 episode
2018–2019	Lodge 49	Ernie	Series regular
2018–present	All American	Willie Baker	Recurring character
2020–2022	All Rise	Charles Carmichael	5 episodes
2020	Insecure	George	Episode: "Lowkey Done"
2021	Snowfall	Henry Nelson	3 episodes
2022	Young Sheldon	Henry	Episode: "Passion's Harvest and a Sheldocracy"
2023	Bookie	John Franklin	2 episodes
