= Anne Marie McEvoy =

American actress, psychologist, and associate professor

AnneMarie Conley
- Born: 1975
- Other names: AnneMarie McEvoy, Ann Marie McEvoy, AnneMarie Conley
- Education: University of Michigan
- Occupations: Actress; psychologist; associate professor
- Years active: 1982–1991, 2016

Anne Marie McEvoy (born 1975) is an American actress, psychologist, and associate professor.

== Career ==
McEvoy's first major role was as Little Girl on the American sitcom Archie Bunker's Place, from 1982. She also guest starred and starred in many movies and television series. McEvoy is known for playing Kathy Santoni in season three of the sitcom Full House. She also appeared as Sarah in the film Children of the Corn (1984), in the television movie Lots of Luck (1985) and in the Japanese movie Piramiddo no kanata ni: White Lion densetsu (1989).

She was also the original voice of Max's sister Zoe in a pilot episode for an animated project called Space Baby (which later went onto become a full 26-episode series Fantastic Max). The role was then given to Elisabeth Harnois after the project was picked up by Hanna-Barbera and changed its title to Fantastic Max.

In 1991, McEvoy took a 25-year break from acting to focus on her personal life. She reprised her role as "Kathy Santoni" in the Full House reboot-series Fuller House.

== Personal life ==
McEvoy received her B.A. in psychology at the University of California, Berkeley in 2000. She received her PhD in education and psychology at the University of Michigan in 2007. As of now she is an associate professor at the University of California, Irvine.

== Filmography ==
Film and television roles
Year	Title	Role	Notes
1982	Archie Bunker's Place	Little Girl	Episode: "Father Christmas"
1983	The Paper Chase	Stephanie Norman	Episode: "Cinderella"
1984	Children of the Corn	Sarah	
1984	Invitation to Hell	Janie	
1985	Lots of Luck		TV movie
1985	Sweet Sea	Sweet Sea	TV movie
1986	Space Baby	Zoe (voice)	Original pilot only
1986	Family Ties	Alice	1 episode
1985	Potato Head Kids	Puff (voice)	
1989	Piramiddo no kanata ni: White Lion densetsu	Maria	
1989	Free Spirit	Dawn	Episode: "Hallowinnie"
1989–90	Full House	Kathy Santoni	4 episodes
2014	Fuller House	Kathy Santoni	Episode: "DJ and Kimmy's High School Reunion"
