= Rita Hayworth and Shawshank Redemption =

1982 novella by Stephen King

- Author: Stephen King
- Language: English
- Genre: Realism, crime fiction
- Published in: Different Seasons, Stephen King Goes to the Movies
- Publisher: Viking Press
- Publication date: 1982
- Publication place: United States
- Media type: Print (Hardcover)

Rita Hayworth and Shawshank Redemption is a realist novella by Stephen King. It was first published in 1982 by Viking Press in his collection Different Seasons. It was later included in the 2009 collection Stephen King Goes to the Movies. The plot follows former bank vice president Andy Dufresne, who is wrongly convicted of murdering his wife and her lover and ends up in Shawshank State Penitentiary, where corruption and violence are rampant.

Stephen King described Rita Hayworth and Shawshank Redemption as a prison escape story in the vein of old Warner Bros. films. The work, written in a genre unusual for King, is considered one of his best works. The story was adapted to film in 1994 by Frank Darabont. The film, The Shawshank Redemption, was nominated for seven Academy Awards in 1994, including Best Picture, and has been regarded as one of the best films of all time. The main roles were played by Tim Robbins and Morgan Freeman. In 2009, the story was adapted for the stage as The Shawshank Redemption.

== Plot ==
The story takes place in Maine and is told from the perspective of Shawshank State Prison inmate Ellis "Red" Redding, a 57-year-old Irish-American. In 1938, Red staged a car accident, having previously insured his wife for a large amount, but a neighbor and her child also got into his wife’s car. As a result, Red was sentenced to three life sentences for the murders. Red is known for his ability to smuggle in almost any contraband via his connections.

In 1948, he is approached by former bank vice president Andy Dufresne, a prisoner who arrived at Shawshank a year earlier. Dufresne was sentenced to life imprisonment for the murder of his wife and her lover, despite his claims of innocence. He asks Red to get him a rock hammer, explaining that he is collecting minerals. A year later, Andy requests a large poster of Rita Hayworth. He gets into several fights with a gang of prison rapists led by Bogs Diamond, which end after Bogs is severely injured by the guards; Red suggests that Andy bribed the guards into doing so. One day, Andy overhears guard Byron Hadley complaining about the tax imposed on an inheritance he had recently received and offers help in resolving this issue. Hadley accepts the offer and treats all the prisoners to beer in gratitude. Over the years, Andy provides financial advice to the prison administration and assists with tax returns and loans.

He is transferred to the prison library, in which he launders money for the prison administration. He also seeks funding from the Maine Senate to expand the library, which he hopes will better prepare prisoners for life after release. Andy meets Tommy Williams, who tells him that his cellmate from another prison bragged about committing the murders that Andy was convicted of. Andy attempts to use Tommy's testimony to get his case reconsidered, but the warden, Samuel Norton, does not grant his freedom, as Andy knows too much about the administration's money laundering scheme and is too valuable as an accountant to release. Hoping to break Andy's spirit, Norton places him in solitary confinement for 20 days and transfers Tommy to another prison. While in confinement, Andy refuses to continue accounting but complies when Norton threatens to worsen his living conditions and destroy the library.

In October 1967, Andy tells Red about "Peter Stevens", a pseudonym under which Andy had sold off his assets and invested the proceeds. He says that one day Peter Stevens will own a seaside resort hotel in Zihuatanejo, Mexico. On the morning of March 12, 1975, after 28 years in prison, Andy disappears from his locked cell. Norton discovers that the poster pasted to Andy's cell wall covers a man-sized hole – Andy had used his rock hammer to slowly dig a tunnel through the wall. Norton resigns three months after Andy's escape, and six months later, Red receives a blank postcard from McNary, Texas, a town near the Mexican border, and surmises that Andy crossed the border there.

In March 1977, Red is paroled but has difficulty adjusting to life outside of prison. He finds a letter addressed to him from Peter Stevens containing $1,000 and inviting him to join Andy in Mexico. Red decides to break his parole and join Andy.

== Adaptation ==
The novella has been adapted into a film, The Shawshank Redemption, starring Tim Robbins as Andy, and Morgan Freeman as Red, and a play of the same name. The film version was nominated for seven Oscars at the 67th Academy Awards in 1995, including Best Picture and Best Actor for Freeman. Morgan Freeman stated in an interview that this novella is his favorite story.

== See also ==
- Stephen King short fiction bibliography
