= Lookin' Italian =

1994 film by Guy Magar

- Directed by: Guy Magar
- Screenplay by: Guy Magar
- Produced by: Guy Magar
- Starring: Jay Acovone; Matt LeBlanc; Stephanie Richards; Lou Rawls
- Cinematography: Gerry Lively
- Edited by: Greg Harrison
- Music by: Jeff Beal
- Release date: January 1994
- Running time: 97 minutes
- Country: United States
- Languages: English; Italian
- Budget: $380,000

Lookin' Italian is a 1994 American crime film directed by Guy Magar and starring Jay Acovone and Matt LeBlanc.

== Plot ==
Vinny Pallazzo is a retired gangster who has left the mafia after a disastrous incident. Now working as a clerk in a dusty bookshop of Los Angeles, he has to look after his young, reckless nephew Anthony, who lives fast, spending his time between seducing girls at the bookshop, dancing in nightclubs and playing poker games with friends.

Vinny tries to do everything so that Anthony doesn't cross paths with mafia and gang wars, as he is afraid that his brash and hot-blooded nephew might end up like his father - dead. But that may be a lot more difficult than it sounds, especially after Anthony's girlfriend is brutally killed with another friend of his, by a gang. Anthony then wants to be avenged, especially after learning the truth about his father.

== Cast ==
- Jay Acovone as Vinny Pallazzo
- Matt LeBlanc as Anthony Manetti
- Stephanie Richards as Danielle
- John LaMotta as Don Dinardo
- Ralph Manza as Manza
- Lou Rawls as Willy
- Daniel O'Callaghan as Buster
- Réal Andrews as Riva
- Tommy Morgan Jr. (credited as Tommy Morgan) as Leon
- Nichole Carter as Dominique

Argentina Brunetti plays a grandmother. Denise Richards (credited as Denise Lee Richards) portrays Elizabeth.

== Production ==
A low-budget independent movie, Lookin' Italian is meant to be, in director Guy Magar words, "an hommage to Scorsese and to Italian-American culture ... To me, the words "Lookin' Italian" mean "lookin' good".

Magar also mentioned in his autobiography about the good friendship between Acovone and LeBlanc, as Acovone took LeBlanc under his wing and helped him with his acting.

== Critical reception ==
The critical response was mixed. Variety said:

Vet TV director Guy Magar takes an able cast through the paces of a story that feels stitched together from too many well-worn sources. The story of an ex-Mafioso who tries to start a new life, but finds it difficult to shake family allegiances and his violent past, Lookin' Italian fails to overcome the script's familiar turns and hoary cliches. Inconsistencies in tone, ranging from Revenge of the Nerds humor to bloody Tarantino-style mayhem and A Bronx Tale domestic melodrama, further distance pic from theatrical contention. The attractive leads and colorful supporting characters may help only enough for a video spot. ... With solid tech support, pic looks and sounds fine, but could use some judicious editing, especially in the draggy first act. An excess of repetitive dialogue could use pruning as well.

On the other hand, other newspapers gave some good reviews, especially for a low-budget and low-promoted film. The Press Enterprise remarked, for example, that Lookin' Italian was "A powerful, smart and sassy independently-made film that comes together so well – blending comedy and drama, issues and entertainment – is a tribute to Guy Magar who made it for the low Hollywood cost of under $1-million!".
