= Indyfans and the Quest for Fortune and Glory =

- Film poster
- Directed by: Brandon Kleyla
- Written by: Brandon Kleyla
- Produced by: Kevin English; Frank Bettag
- Cinematography: James Filsinger; Scott Keeler; Bill Kleyla; Brandon Kleyla
- Edited by: Brandon Kleyla
- Music by: Michael McCormack
- Production company: Red Dot Film Studios
- Distributed by: Cinema Libre Studio
- Release date: April 27, 2008 (Newport Beach International Film Festival)
- Running time: 60 minutes (festival); 80 minutes (DVD)
- Country: United States
- Language: English

Indyfans and the Quest for Fortune and Glory is a 2008 American feature length documentary fan film written and directed by Brandon Kleyla to examine interest in the Indiana Jones films through interviews and profiles of more than 50 devotees of the films.

== Background ==
Kleyla had been himself an actor since 1991 when he performed in an equity production of Evita at Daytona Beach Community College. In 1995 he played the character Bobby Fricker in the film Now and Then, followed by his role as Josiah in Children of the Corn IV: The Gathering (1996), the young version of the character James Whale in Gods and Monsters (1998), and the character of Young Kevin in Free Enterprise (1998). In 2000 he partnered with his sister Alexis to form 'Red Dot Film Studios', and in 2005 his first project as writer and director was the comedy film The Road to Canyon Lake. Indyfans and the Quest for Fortune and Glory became Kleyla's second project as writer and director.

=== Production ===
Kleyla had been wanting to create a documentary about Indiana Jones fandom, and it was the announcement of the fourth film of the series that acted as his impetus. As a self-professed fan of the Indiana Jones films, director Kleyla made note that while there are fan conventions for Star Wars and Star Trek films, there are none for Indiana Jones films. In the summer of 2007, he began work to create a documentary about those he refers to as "the felt-hatted faithful". Stating that the film began "just for fun", Kleyla learned through his interview processes that the Indiana Jones films "have really gotten to people", just as he had himself become a fan of the films when as a child he repeatedly visited the Indiana Jones attraction at Disney World in Florida.

The film's initial scenes were shot at New Haven, Connecticut where the director had hoped to catch the filming of Indiana Jones and the Kingdom of the Crystal Skull, following which production went to San Diego Comicon for additional fan interviews, then interviews with designers of the Indiana Jones attraction at Disney World, interviews with some peripheral members of the Jones production team: whip trainer Anthony DeLongis, costumer Deborah Nadoolman-Landis, and stunt doubles Vic Armstrong and Wendy Leech. The documentary concluded with a trip to Las Vegas to attend an auction of film props which included Indy's whip and the holy grail prop from Indiana Jones and the Last Crusade.

== Critical response ==
Film Threat made note of the film's interviews with fans and with industry professionals "marginally" associated with the Indiana Jones films or franchises, and wrote of the filmmaker's belief that the films made actual impact on people's lives. In panning the film, they wrote that they "threaten to be interesting on occasion, but the interviews do nothing to reinforce the filmmaker's thesis, because he doesn't have one." Writing that the interviews seemed more haphazard than properly planned, they wrote that it seemed the director "just sort of rounded up people who like the films, and a few people who were marginally involved with the films, got them to speak a bit, and then edited the footage together without much of a direction to it". The reviewer placed the lack of the film's focus directly on "the director's choice of questions, his inability to draw the best anecdotes out of his interview subjects, and a lack of skill in the editing room."

USA Today spoke of how films and film franchises achieve "greatness". In using David Lean's Lawrence of Arabia as a yardstick, they noted that films can accomplish this through "deft directing, stellar acting and breathtaking scenery", or achieve it through the passion of fans toward certain films and their characters. They expanded that while films such as Star Wars and Star Trek series are famous for their fans, "Indy devotees politely and proudly separate themselves from folks who prefer films set in an era of intergalactic travel".

Blogcritics make note that since filmmaker Brandon Kleyla since was born in 1983, he was too young to have seen the Indiana Jones trilogy original theatrical releases, but that after repetitively watching the Indiana Jones stunt show at Disney's MGM Studios, he "fell in love with the character", and began what is "reported to be one of the largest Indiana Jones memorabilia collections in the world". They expanded that the common theme about the persons being interviewed: "the love of Indiana Jones". They concluded by writing that the documentary "is a fun film that looks at how the Indiana Jones character and films have left their mark on pop culture and how Indy is one of the more recognizable icons of the 20th century."

== Release ==
The film premiered at the Newport Beach International Film Festival on April 27, 2008, and had its DVD release on October 7, 2008 through Cinema Libre Studio.
