= 1408 (short story) =

Short story by Stephen King

- Short story by Stephen King
- Country: United States
- Language: English
- Genre: Horror short story

Publication
- Published in: Blood and Smoke, Everything's Eventual, Stephen King Goes to the Movies
- Publisher: Simon & Schuster Audio
- Media type: Audiobook anthology
- Publication date: November 1999

"1408" is a short story by Stephen King. It was first published in the audiobook collection Blood and Smoke, released in 1999. In 2002, "1408" was collected in written form in King's Everything's Eventual. In the introduction to the story, King says that "1408" is his version of what he calls the "Ghostly Room at the Inn", his term for the theme of haunted hotel or motel rooms in horror fiction. He originally wrote the first few pages as part of an appendix for his non-fiction book, On Writing (2000), to be used as an example of how a story changes from one draft document to the next. King also noted how the numbers of the title add up to the supposedly unlucky number 13.

== Plot ==
Mike Enslin is a writer of non-fiction works based on the theme of haunted places: Ten Nights in Ten Haunted Houses, Ten Nights in Ten Haunted Graveyards, and Ten Nights in Ten Haunted Castles. They prove to be best-sellers, but Enslin feels some guilt at their success, privately acknowledging that he does not believe in the paranormal and supernatural elements he investigates.

Arriving at the Dolphin Hotel on 61st Street in New York City, Enslin is intent on spending the night in the hotel's infamous Room 1408 as part of his research for his next book, Ten Nights in Ten Haunted Hotel Rooms. He is met by the hotel's manager, Mr. Olin, who fills him in on the room's morbid history – 1408 has been responsible for 52 deaths, at least 12 of them suicides, over a span of 68 years. While remarking he does not believe there are ghosts in 1408, Olin insists there is "something" that resides inside, causing terrible things to happen to anyone who stays within its walls for anything but the briefest lengths of time. As such, he has striven to keep the room vacant during his tenure as manager, a period of nearly 20 years. Olin also reveals that, due to the superstitious practice of never recognizing the 13th floor (the room is listed as being on the 14th), it is a room cursed by existing on the 13th floor, the room number's digits adding up to 13 making the implication worse.

Enslin is secretly affected by Olin's remarks and evidence, but his determination to not appear superstitious and follow through with his research prevails. He demands the right to stay in the room by threatening legal action against the hotel. Olin pleads with Enslin to reconsider, believing that a skeptic would be highly susceptible to the room's powers. At Enslin's continued insistence, Olin reluctantly leads him to 1408, unwilling to accompany him further than the elevator landing on the 14th floor.

Enslin's problems with Room 1408 begin before he even sets foot through the door; the door itself initially appears to be canted to the left. After he looks away and back, the door appears perfectly straight. Then, after looking a third time, it appears to be crooked again, except now to the right. Chalking the experience up to Olin's attempt to manipulate him, he prepares himself to enter the room.

Enslin spends 70 minutes in Room 1408, dictating his experience into a handheld tape recorder. Almost immediately, his train of thought takes unwelcome and chaotic turns – he compares it to being "stoned on bad, cheap dope" – and he experiences bizarre visual hallucinations. A breakfast menu on the nightstand changes languages to French, then Russian, then Italian, then a woodcut of a wolf eating a screaming boy's leg. The pattern on the wallpaper seems to shift and warp, and the room's pictures transform into grotesque parodies. Enslin feels his feet sink into the carpet like quicksand, and he hears a nightmarish voice on the room's phone chanting terrifying phrases: "This is nine! Nine! We have killed your friends! Every friend is now dead! This is six! Six!"

The room itself begins to melt, the walls and ceiling warping and bowing inward. Enslin senses a dangerous, otherworldly presence coming for him. In desperation, he sets his "lucky" Hawaiian shirt on fire while wearing it, breaking the room's spell long enough for him to escape. As he stumbles out into the hall, another hotel guest douses him with ice. When the other guest looks inside the room and is tempted to enter, Enslin warns him not to, claiming the room is "haunted". The door slams shut.

After his ordeal, Enslin gives up writing altogether. He has acquired various physical and psychological problems stemming from his brief stay in the room. He notes to himself (as Olin expressed earlier) that there are no ghosts in 1408, because ghosts were once merely humans, while the entity he encountered was horrifically inhuman. In the end, Enslin sleeps with his lights on, has removed all his house's phones, and always draws the curtains before dark; he cannot stand the shade of yellow-orange at sunset that reminds him of the light inside Room 1408.

== Reference in other works ==
A part of the drafts to the story was included in On Writing as a study of how King edits his work.

== Film adaptation ==
The Swedish film director Mikael Håfström developed a movie, 1408, based on the short story, starring John Cusack as Michael Enslin and Samuel L. Jackson as Mr. Olin. It was released on June 22, 2007 and was a critical and financial success in its opening weekend, earning $20.1 million.

== See also ==
- Stephen King short fiction bibliography
