= Children of the Corn 666: Isaac's Return =

1999 film by Kari Skogland

- Promotional release poster
- Directed by: Kari Skogland
- Written by: Tim Sulka; John Franklin
- Based on: Children of the Corn by Stephen King
- Produced by: Bill Berry; Jeff Geoffray; Walter Josten
- Starring: Nancy Allen; Natalie Ramsey; Paul Popowich; John Franklin
- Cinematography: Richard Clabaugh
- Edited by: Troy T. Takaki
- Music by: Terry Michael Huud
- Production companies: Dimension Films; Blue Rider Pictures
- Distributed by: Buena Vista Home Video
- Release date: October 19, 1999
- Running time: 82 minutes
- Country: United States
- Language: English

Children of the Corn 666: Isaac's Return is a 1999 American supernatural slasher film directed by Kari Skogland and starring Nancy Allen, Natalie Ramsey, John Franklin, and Stacy Keach. It is the sixth entry in the Children of the Corn film series.

The film is the first in the series to feature John Franklin reprising his role as Isaac, who had not appeared in the franchise since the first film. It is also the first of the straight-to-video sequels to have some narrative connection to the original film.

The film was followed by another straight-to-video sequel, Children of the Corn: Revelation (2001).

== Plot ==
Hannah, born in the original Gatlin, Nebraska cult led by nefarious prophet Isaac, visits the town to find her birth mother. After having a mysterious encounter with a street preacher, Zachariah, Hannah crashes her car in a cornfield. She is escorted to the hospital by the sheriff, Cora, where she is examined by Dr. Michaels. There, Hannah finds that Isaac—long thought dead—has been hospitalized in a coma for years.

After she leaves the hospital and resumes her journey, she is nearly driven off the road by a mysterious truck. After checking into a motel, she meets a pair of romantically involved teenagers in the motel office, the standoffish Morgan and her boyfriend, Matt. The following day, as Hannah leaves, a small crowd gathers around her car, fascinated by her. Meanwhile, Isaac awakens from his coma and learns he has a son. Hannah returns to the hospital and encounters Gabriel, who helps her find her birth certificate. She is attacked by Jake, who attempts to kill her with an axe, but he is stopped by Gabriel.

Hannah experiences a number of strange visions, and learns that the woman who attempted to force her off the road was Rachel Colby, Hannah's birthmother. At the town church, Rachel confronts Isaac, who accuses her of betrayal. Dr. Michaels acts as a confidant to Rachel, urging her to stop Isaac. Shortly after, Isaac kills Dr. Michaels before approaching Matt, revealed to be his son who he hopes will carry on his legacy. Meanwhile, Rachel confronts Hannah, whom she long believed to be dead, but is evasive regarding the events surrounding Hannah's birth, only commenting that it has been prophesied that Hannah would return to Gatlin on the eve of her nineteenth birthday.

That night, the cult gathers in the cornfield under Isaac's command, branding Matt as the first of the "chosen". Hannah arrives, and is injected with a sedative by the cultists. The cult begins a union ceremony between Matt and Hannah, but Hannah escapes. Rachel appears at the gathering, claiming Isaac is a false prophet. Morgan attempts to intervene to help Hannah, only to be bisected by Isaac with a machete. Gabriel flees, uniting with Hannah in a barn, where the two have sex. Matt proceeds to commit suicide by falling on a scythe.

Rachel is held captive in the hospital basement. Gabriel kills Jesse before Hannah confronts Isaac, who believes himself to be "He Who Walks Behind the Rows". Gabriel, using his supernatural powers, forces Cora to shoot herself, before confronting Isaac with the revelation that he was in fact the firstborn child of Isaac's cult, and that Isaac denied him his birthright in favor of his own son.

Gabriel instructs Hannah to kill Isaac, but Rachel urges her not to. He then reveals himself to be fully possessed by He Who Walks Behind the Rows. Gabriel restrains Isaac with his supernatural powers, killing him with a broken lead pipe. Rachel subsequently stabs Gabriel. Rachel and Hannah flee as Gabriel remarks that "The seeds have already been sown". Gabriel's wound miraculously heals itself, and he begins to set off explosions, killing Jake.

Hannah and Rachel leave on foot, walking down a country road. Hannah is unaware of what Gabriel's words meant—that she is currently pregnant with the child of He Who Walks Behind the Rows, continuing the cult's legacy.

== Cast ==
- John Franklin as Isaac Chroner
- Natalie Ramsey as Hannah Martin
- Nancy Allen as Rachel Colby
- Paul Popowich as Gabriel
- Alix Koromzay as Sheriff Cora
- John Patrick White as Matt Chroner
- Nathan Bexton as Jesse
- William Prael as Jake
- Sydney Bennett as Morgan
- Stacy Keach as Dr. Micheals

== Production ==
John Franklin, who had starred as Isaac in the original Children of the Corn film, had wanted to do a sequel with his writing partner, Tim Sulka, since the original film's 1984 release. Franklin's acting manager had a connection to Dimension Films and was able to secure Franklin and Sulka a meeting. Upon the two pitching their concept of Isaac's Return, Dimension executives responded to the pitch with "Great! We're running out of ideas!".

Kari Skogland was offered the job of directing a sixth Children of the Corn film with Dimension Films saying they wanted to make a series entry that was more different and unique from its predecessors. Despite not being a fan of horror, Skogland accepted the offer, seeing it as a challenge. Skogland met with writers Sulka and Franklin, with Skogland interested in the nature of Franklin's script as a direct follow-up to the first film in contrast to the standalone sequels. In order to differentiate the film from prior entries, Skogland avoided CGI and post-production effects work in favor of in-camera effects, as she wanted to give the film a more grounded feel. Skogland also sought to make He Who Walks Behind the Rows a more morally conflicted character, while Isaac would be the true evil through which it's corrupted. The movie was filmed around two small cornfields in the Los Angeles area with the production crew using trick photography to give it the look of rural Nebraska.

== Release ==
The film, just like the last three installments before it, was not theatrically released but went direct-to-video on October 19, 1999, on VHS and DVD formats.

The film debuted on the Blu-ray format for the first time via Echo Bridge Entertainment on May 15, 2011. It was included in a double feature with its predecessor that was also making its Blu-ray debut, Children of the Corn V: Fields of Terror (1998).

== Reception ==
On review aggregator Rotten Tomatoes, Children of the Corn 666: Isaac's Return holds a 0% rating based on six reviews. Michael Dequina of The Movie Report stated: "666 runs a scant 78 minutes, but it feels at least twice as long; there's nothing interesting, let alone scary or exciting in this cheapie. Even the acting, while bad, isn't quite bad enough to be laughable."

== See also ==
- Children of the Corn (film series)
- List of adaptations of works by Stephen King

== Sources ==
- Browning, Mark (2011). Stephen King on the Small Screen. Chicago, Illinois: Intellect Books. ISBN 978-1-841-50412-4.
