= Disciples of the Crow =

1983 American short film directed by John Woodward

- VHS cover
- Directed by: John Woodward
- Written by: John Woodward
- Based on: "Children of the Corn" by Stephen King
- Produced by: John Woodward; Johnny Stevens
- Starring: Eleese Lester; Gabriel Folse
- Cinematography: Johnny Stevens
- Edited by: John Woodward
- Music by: Bill Averbach
- Distributed by: Karl James Associates
- Release date: May 10, 1983
- Running time: 19 min
- Country: United States
- Language: English

Disciples of the Crow is a 1983 American supernatural short film directed by John Woodward. It is the initial installment of the Children of the Corn film series. The film contains themes of religious fanaticism, violence and mysticism, while the ending differs from the original story, allowing the characters to escape, but leaving a sense of anxiety and uncertainty. Disciples of the Crow is a condensed but atmospheric adaptation of 1977 short story by Stephen King, focusing on the horror and religious madness of child cultists. The film won a Gold Hugo Award at the Chicago Film Festival.

== Plot ==
The action begins in 1971 in the small town of Jonah, Oklahoma. The town suffers from a drought, which local children explain by their religious cult, worshiping corn and a mysterious creature that manifests itself through crows living in the fields. The children are led by a boy named Bobby, noticeable by a birthmark on his face. After Sunday service, the children commit a brutal and merciless murder of their parents.

Years later, the main characters of the film—a married couple Vicky and Burt—accidentally end up in these places, lost among the cornfields. On the radio, they hear a religious sermon, and on the roads they see warning signs with death threats for those who refuse to worship the land. They hit a boy who suddenly ran out onto the road, and find that his throat is slit. Having reached the nearest town of Jonah, they plunge into the secrets and horrors associated with the cult children.

== Cast ==
- Eleese Lester as Vicky
- Gabriel Folse as Burt
- Steven Young as Younger Billy
- Martin Boozer as Preacher
- Kathleen Alsobrook as Mother
- Loren Bivens as Boyfriend
- John Woodward as Older Billy

== Differences from the original story ==
- The original story is set in the town of Gatlin, Nebraska while the short film takes place in the town of Jonah, Oklahoma.
- In the original story, the corn demon (He Who Walks Behind the Rows) is not depicted as a crow deity but as a monstrous creature.
- The end of the original story is completely different from that of the short film. In the story, both Burt and Vicky are killed—but they survive in the film.

== Reception ==
Gina Wurtz of Screen Rant stated: "As a short film, Disciples of the Crow gets straight to the point and doesn't linger on any unnecessary scenes or storylines. While there isn't much room for it to elaborate on deeper plots, this is actually a good thing because it prevents the film from losing its message... Disciples of the Crow is a more accurate and compelling adaptation. Although it makes cuts to the source material due to its limited time, it maintains the heart of King's story — something none of the Children of the Corn sequels and reboots manage."

== See also ==
- Children of the Corn (1984 film)
- Dollar Baby
- List of adaptations of works by Stephen King
