= Children of the Corn IV: The Gathering =

1996 film by Greg Spence

- Home video release poster
- Directed by: Greg Spence
- Written by: Stephen Berger; Greg Spence
- Based on: Children of the Corn by Stephen King
- Produced by: Gary Depew
- Starring: Naomi Watts; Brent Jennings; Karen Black
- Cinematography: Richard Clabaugh
- Edited by: Christopher Cibelli
- Music by: David C. Williams
- Production company: Dimension Films
- Distributed by: Buena Vista Home Video (Note: Distributed under the Dimension Home Video banner.)
- Release date: October 8, 1996
- Running time: 85 minutes
- Country: United States
- Language: English

Children of the Corn IV: The Gathering is a 1996 American supernatural slasher film co-written and directed by Greg Spence and starring Naomi Watts, Brent Jennings, and Karen Black. It is the fourth film in the Children of the Corn film series. The plot follows a medical student returning to her hometown in Nebraska, where she finds the children to be falling under a mysterious mass illness connected to the town's past.

The film expands upon the origins of "He Who Walks Behind the Rows". The film marked the first time Naomi Watts received first billing, and was also the debut of actor Mark Salling.

The film was followed by an unrelated sequel entitled Children of the Corn V: Fields of Terror (1998).

== Plot ==
Medical student Grace Rhodes (Naomi Watts) returns to her hometown of Grand Island, Nebraska to take care of her agoraphobic mother, June (Karen Black), who refuses to leave her yard. She is having recurring nightmares of being attacked by children. Grace must also look after her younger siblings, James and Margaret. She takes a job at Dr. Larson's local clinic, where she'd worked before. James and Margaret become ill, showing similar symptoms to those of the children in June's dreams. While working at Dr. Larson's office the next day, Grace notices that many other kids have the same symptoms. During the night, all of the kids' conditions worsen as their fevers skyrocket. Suddenly, the fevers drop.

Local parents Donald (Brent Jennings) and Sandra Atkins notice that their son Marcus is acting strangely. One night, a group of children descends upon the house, led by a child preacher, and Sandra is murdered in front of Marcus. The police arrive and question Donald; Marcus flees into a field and is chased by the sheriff, whom the child preacher confronts and kills. A suspect in his wife's murder, Donald goes into hiding and is taken in by two elderly sisters, Jane and Rosa (Marietta Marich).

The children stop answering to their names and claim to be other people; longtime resident Dr. Larson recognizes the names they use as those of dead children from the town's history. One night, he is killed in his office by two children. When Grace arrives the next day, his body has vanished, and the children's blood tests reveal inexplicable signs of decay and death. June's recurring nightmares start up again—but she is not dreaming; it's all actually happening. She flees her house and drives away, spotting James entering an old barn. She follows him inside, and after which, the children gather at the barn.

Grace decides to go to Dr. Larsen's house to find him. Donald hijacks her car and forces her to drive at gunpoint. They go to Jane and Rosa's house. Rosa reveals that the child preacher, Josiah, was the illegitimate son of a local woman. Traveling preachers took him in, and he became a gifted preacher. Over the years, Josiah stopped aging and never grew out of boyhood. The traveling preachers gave him over to darkness to stunt his growth, but when word got out, they abandoned him. Josiah killed the preachers, then the townspeople burned him alive and sealed his remains in a well.

Meanwhile, Mary Anne, Grace's best friend and co-worker, is attacked and killed by Josiah. Grace and Donald return to the clinic and discover that Margaret is missing, but they learn that Josiah's weakness is mercury. It is also revealed that Rosa is Josiah's mother. Margaret, James, Marcus, and all the other children gather at the barn and offer blood to Josiah. Despite being a hemophiliac and at risk of bleeding to death from even a small cut, Marcus cuts his hand and offers his blood to Josiah, while Margaret offers Josiah her soul. Marcus collapses from blood loss, and Margaret is pulled into the pool of blood, from which Josiah emerges.

Donald and Grace arrive at the barn and connect its sprinkler system to their supply of mercury. Donald fills two of his bullets with mercury and gives Grace the gun. Donald stops Marcus' bleeding, but the children try to kill him. Josiah attacks Grace, but she shoots him with a mercury bullet. She then finds the bodies of June and Dr. Larson. Josiah attacks her again, but she activates the sprinklers, which shower him with mercury. Grace then slashes him with his own scythe, finally killing him. The children stop trying to kill Donald and return to normal. Grace finds Margaret nearly drowned, but manages to revive her.

It is revealed that Margaret is actually Grace's daughter and that she abandoned her with June as a teenager. After the victims' funerals, Grace, Margaret, James, Donald, and Marcus all move out of Nebraska.

== Cast ==
- Naomi Watts as Grace Rhodes
- Jamie Renée Smith as Margaret Rhodes
- Karen Black as June Rhodes
- Brent Jennings as Donald Atkins
- Toni Marsh as Sandra Atkins
- Lewis Flanagan III as Marcus Atkins
- Mark Salling as James Rhodes
- Brandon Kleyla as Josiah
- Salle Ellis as Jane Nock
- Marietta Marich as Rosa Nock
- Jonathan Patterson as Charlie McLellan
- Joshua Patterson as Scott McLellan
- Kay Bower as Janet McLellan
- Samaria Graham as Mary Anne
- William Windom as Doc Rob Larson
- Adam Lidberg as Michael
- Libby Villari as Michael's mom
- Stephen Earnhart as Wilks
- James Krieg as Smits
- Richard Gross as Sheriff Biggs

== Production ==
Following the completion of Children of the Corn III: Urban Harvest, Dimension Films fully acquired the sequel rights to Children of the Corn from Trans-Atlantic Pictures and Park Avenue Productions but without the rights to characters from the first three films which saw Dimension abandon any attempts at continuity in favor of more of a "cycle" approach similar to the Roger Corman-produced Poe films where the series would feature recurring themes and motifs without any actual running storylines. Dimension hired Stephen Berger to write the screenplay, having previously hired Berger's writing partner, Rand Ravich, to rewrite Hellraiser: Bloodline after Dimension acquired the Hellraiser series.

Greg Spence was offered the opportunity to direct Children of the Corn IV after having spent the previous years at Miramax, after serving as director of production overseeing projects at Miramax's West Coast offices. Filming for Children of the Corn IV: The Gathering began on July 10, 1995 and took place in Austin, Texas. According to Watts, she was paid $5,000 for her work in the film. Upon viewing a rough cut of the film, Spence was given the offer to direct The Prophecy II by Miramax executives who were impressed with his work.

== Release ==
=== Home media ===
Like its immediate predecessor, Children of the Corn III: Urban Harvest, the film did not receive a theatrical release. It was released straight-to-video on October 8, 1996, by Dimension Home Video. It later received a North American DVD release on October 9, 2001. Miramax later released it as part of a six film set containing parts 2-7 and on a nine film set also featuring three titles from the Halloween series.

The film was released on Blu-ray for the first time by Echo Bridge Home Entertainment in a four-film set on November 29, 2011, also featuring Children of the Corn III: Urban Harvest, Children of the Corn V: Fields of Terror, and Children of the Corn 666: Isaac's Return.

=== Critical response ===
Matt Serafini of Dread Central gave the film a positive review, calling it "a marginally better effort than [Part III], even if it ignores the previous film's lead-in ending in favor of taking things back to rural America". He also praised Watts's performance as well as Karen Black's, but noted that the latter "doesn't have much to do". TV Guide gave the film a middling review, noting: "Overall, the film settles for genre cliches instead of any genuinely imaginative twists. A couple of gory jolts aside, the scares are predictable, as are the characters and plotting... Given such material, the performances can't rate high: Watts, so fetching as the sidekick in Tank Girl (1994), is appealing but given little to do except go through the motions; Black gives her typical mannered, eccentric performance; and Kleyla brings no particular malice to the pint-sized villain." Randy Myers of Knight Ridder News Services awarded the film a 2.5 out of 5-star rating, concluding that it "has its own morbid sense of humor and style."

Rebecca Lea of Den of Geek wrote in a retrospective review that The Gathering is "a solidly made film that takes a creepy premise and crafts a few jump scares out of it. The plot ties up in a nice, neat way and there's a decent storyline running through it. The problem is that it feels almost like a horror movie by the numbers that forgets it needs to paint crucial background with a shade of atmosphere. With every jump scare or blood splatter, it feels like it should build, but the tension all but evaporates whenever a slow motion dramatic moment is introduced."

Film scholar Mark Browning gave the film a middling review, criticizing it for its failure to "ground" the religious community of He Who Walks Behind the Rows. Browning also praised Watts's performance and noted that "a few images might remain with viewers", but ultimately deemed the film "highly derivative without any sense of wit or irony". John Kenneth Muir, writing in Horror Films of the 1990s, notes that the film's "idea of a supernatural sickness (based on an old crime) is interesting, and a relief from all the pseudo-religious claptrap of the other Children of the Corn films. No one will ever make the mistake that The Gathering is a great movie, but you won't hate yourself for spending time with it."

== See also ==
- Children of the Corn (film series)
- List of adaptations of works by Stephen King

== Sources ==
- Browning, Mark (2011). Stephen King on the Small Screen. Chicago, Illinois: Intellect Ltd. ISBN 978-1-841-50412-4.
- Muir, John Kenneth (2011). Horror Films of the 1990s. Jefferson, North Carolina: McFarland. ISBN 978-0-786-48480-5.
