= Children of the Corn (2009 film) =

American film by Donald P. Borchers

- DVD cover
- Based on: "Children of the Corn" by Stephen King
- Screenplay by: Donald P. Borchers; Stephen King
- Directed by: Donald P. Borchers
- Starring: Daniel Newman; Kandyse McClure; David Anders; Preston Bailey; Alexa Nikolas
- Music by: Jonathan Elias; Nathaniel Morgan
- Country of origin: United States
- Original language: English

Production
- Producer: Donald P. Borchers
- Cinematography: Jamie Thompson
- Editor: Danny Saphire
- Running time: 92 minutes
- Production companies: Saphire-Borchers; DawnField Entertainment; Planet Productions Corp. Fox Television Studios

Original release
- Network: Syfy
- Release: September 26, 2009

Children of the Corn is a 2009 American supernatural slasher film directed by Donald P. Borchers and written by Borchers and Stephen King, adapted from King's 1977 short story of the same name. It is the eighth installment in the Children of the Corn film series, and is a remake of the original 1984 film. Set primarily in 1975 in the fictional town of Gatlin, Nebraska, the film centers on traveling couple Burt and Vicky as they fight to survive a cult of murderous children who worship an entity known as "He Who Walks Behind the Rows", which had years earlier manipulated the children into killing every adult in town.

Children of the Corn was released on September 26, 2009, on the cable television channel Syfy. The film was panned by critics for Borchers' directing and writing, special effects, acting (particularly McClure) and lack of character development. Critics also condemned it as inferior to the 1984 film.

The film was followed by a straight-to-video soft reboot film to the franchise, Children of the Corn: Genesis (2011).

== Plot ==
In 1963, the town of Gatlin, Nebraska, suffers a severe drought. In a tent, a boy preacher claims that a god, whom he calls "He Who Walks Behind the Rows," has spoken to him in his dreams. He tells the other children that the adults in the town are the cause of their recent problems, as he considers them blasphemous. The children then decide to establish a death cult of children and teenagers to get rid of everyone over the age of 20.

Twelve years later, Burt, a Vietnam veteran, and his temperamental wife, Vicky, travel through rural Nebraska to save their crumbling marriage with a second honeymoon. As they argue, a young boy named Joseph stumbles out of the cornfields, runs to the road, and is accidentally run over by Burt. The couple stops and examines Joseph's corpse and finds out that his throat was slashed before he was struck by their car. Burt puts Joseph's body inside the car's trunk, heads to the cornfields, and finds Joseph's briefcase, which he brings back to the car. The couple decides to go to Gatlin to report the accident, unaware that they are being watched by Isaac Chroner, a nine-year-old boy and the current leader of the cult and his second-in-command, the 18-year-old Malachai Boardman.

As the couple drive to Gatlin, Vicky opens the briefcase and finds a doll made out of corn husks, which she recognizes as pagan. Meanwhile, Isaac informs the cult about the couple's presence and says they are similar to "the blue man," a police officer they sacrifice.

After stopping at an abandoned gas station, Burt and Vicky finally arrive to Gatlin, which they find deserted. Burt decides to investigate the town's church despite Vicky's insistence that they leave. Inside, he finds it empty like the rest of the town, with its crucifix identical to the one that was in Joseph's suitcase.

Vicky soon encounters the cult members and retreats back to the car, but finds herself unable to leave, because Burt has the keys. When cult members begin to demolish the car, Vicky lays on its horn, only to be ignored by Burt. When Malachai approaches Vicky, she threatens him with Burt's rifle, only for him to dodge the shot and stab her. Burt, alerted by the gunshot, exits the church and finds the cult setting the car on fire, causing it to explode with Vicky inside.

Burt runs down an alleyway after Malachai tells him that the sacrifice time is drawing near, only to get cornered and injured by Isaac. After killing two older members, Burt flees into the corn.

Back in the alley, Isaac tells Malachai that the latter's faith in He Who Walks Behind The Rows is being questioned due to him spilling Joseph's blood on the corn, so Malachai prays to appease Him. The leaders later meet with the cult in the cornfield, when a member sees Burt and the cult, under Malachai's order, chase him.

During the chase, Nahum, one of the younger cult members, tells Malachai about having a vision of He Who Walks Behind the Rows, leading Malachai to believe that Nahum will be the next prophet after Isaac. As he escapes the cult, Burt has hallucinations of the Vietnam War, and kills more cult members, including Nahum. Night soon falls, and the cult abandons the search and heads to the church, where two teenage members, a girl and a boy, walk to the stand, disrobe, and have sex in front of Isaac and the entire congregation.

Burt, now lost in the cornfield, wanders aimlessly, searching for the road and having a nightmare of those he killed. Soon, the corn begins to attack Burt, sending him stumbling into the clearing, where he finds Vicky's corpse strung up. In shock, he hallucinates Vicky's corpse telling him that being sacrificed, "is not so bad". The sky soon darkens and He Who Walks Behind The Rows arrives to claim Burt.

The next day, Isaac informs the cult that He Who Walks Behind The Rows is angry with them for being unable to sacrifice Burt. As punishment for their failure, Isaac lowers the age limit from 19 to 18. Malachai obeys this command and leaves with the rest of the cult as Isaac burns the dead cult members' corpses.

In a post-credit scene, the cult returns to the cornfields at night. Malachai talks to his pregnant girlfriend, Ruth, about entering the cornfields. Ruth has her doubts and has a vision of herself setting the cornfields on fire. She tearfully says goodbye to Malachai as he and the other of-age cult members walk into the cornfields and perish to He Who Walks Behind The Rows. Isaac silently glares at Ruth, a hint that he knows her thoughts of burning the corn.

== Cast ==
- David Anders as Burt
- Kandyse McClure as Vicky
- Remington Jennings as Joseph / Ahaz
- Daniel Newman as Malachai
- Preston Bailey as Isaac
- Alexa Nikolas as Ruth
- Robert Gerdisch as Preacher Boy
- Jordan Schmidt as Bloody Knife Boy
- Isabelle Fuhrman as additional voices
- Leo Howard as additional voices

== Production ==
=== Writing ===
While working on the 1984 film as a producer, Donald P. Borchers was originally content with it, though in hindsight came to believe it was too "Hollywoodized" and not true enough to the original short story. Wanting Stephen King to be involved in the production of the new film, Borchers used King's unused script for the 1984 film as a template and updated elements as necessary to adjust for the time period. Borchers sent a copy of the reworked script to him, only to receive a letter from King's attorney stating that King wanted no part in the film; however, when attempting to sort out writing credits, Borchers sent a DVD copy to King who watched the film and approved his screenwriting credit.

=== Filming ===
Casting started two weeks before production began. Unlike in the original film, in which the bulk of the cultists were portrayed by actors over eighteen, Borchers decided to cast age-appropriate actors. He has stated that dealing with the largely underage cast was the most difficult part of making the film.

The film was filmed in Lost Nation, Iowa and Rural Oxford Junction, Iowa area. Borchers said he chose the Iowa and Illinois area after receiving a recommendation from the Iowa Film Office in the state Department of Economic Development. Shooting took place in and around the Quad Cities during September 2008.

== Release ==
The film premiered on Syfy on September 26, 2009, and was released uncut on DVD by Anchor Bay on October 6. The DVD included such features as interviews with cast and crew and behind-the-scenes footage. A Blu-ray release followed on November 16, 2010.

== See also ==
- List of adaptations of works by Stephen King
