= Children of the Corn: Runaway =

- Blu-Ray disc cover
- Directed by: John Gulager
- Written by: Joel Soisson
- Based on: "Children of the Corn" by Stephen King
- Produced by: Michael Leahy
- Starring: Marci Miller; Jack Ryan Scott
- Cinematography: Samuel Calvin
- Edited by: John Gulager
- Music by: Philip Griffin
- Production company: Dimension Films
- Distributed by: Lionsgate Home Entertainment
- Release date: March 13, 2018
- Running time: 82 minutes
- Country: United States
- Language: English

Children of the Corn: Runaway is a 2018 American supernatural horror film directed by John Gulager. It is the tenth installment of the Children of the Corn film series and a sequel to Children of the Corn: Genesis (2011). The film stars Marci Miller, Jack Ryan Scott, and Diane Ayala Goldner.

The film was released directly to DVD and digital platforms on March 13, 2018, by Lionsgate.

== Plot ==
Ruth is a teenager fleeing a cult of child murderers to hide in a small town in the American Midwest. She spends the next decade without revealing her name and origin as she tries to save herself and her son Aaron from the horrors that she had to endure in her childhood. But one day, she notices that something follows them. Now Ruth must confront the ancient evil or risk losing her child.

== Cast ==
- Marci Miller as Ruth
- Jack Ryan Scott as Aaron
- Mary Kathryn Bryant as Sarah
- Lynn Andrews as Carl
- Diane Ayala Goldner as Mrs. Dawkins
- Eric Starkey as Officer Dave
- Daria Balling as Candy
- Clu Gulager as Crusty

== Production ==
The film was produced by Dimension Films with the intention of retaining the rights to the Children of the Corn franchise. Joel Soisson, director of Genesis and producer of Revelation, returns as writer and producer. John Gulager serves as the film's director.

In March 2016, principal photography commenced in Oklahoma. It was shot alongside Hellraiser: Judgment, both in the same building. Both films are produced by Michael Leahy. In June 2016, filming wrapped, after 3 months of shooting.

== Release ==
The film was released directly to DVD and digital platforms on March 13, 2018, by Lionsgate Films.

== Reception ==
Luiz H. C. of Bloody Disgusting wrote: "Ultimately, Children of the Corn: Runaway could have been a legitimately interesting character piece featuring some familiar bite-sized antagonists, but regrettably squanders its potential on a shallow script, despite some of Gulager's trademarked flare. Remarkably, this isn't the worst sequel in the series, but it won't be revitalizing the franchise anytime soon. Unless you're a diehard worshipper of He Who Walks Behind the Rows, I'd give this one a pass."

Stefan Birgir Stefans of sbs.is mentioned: "There is nothing technically wrong with the film. Even the actors are fine. It's just not a fun horror film, like one would expect. The horror is tacked onto a drama."

Cody Hamman of JoBlo.com gave a more positive review, summarizing the film "was much different from what I was expecting. It's much more serious, quiet, and low-key. I was expecting cheesy killer kid shenanigans, and instead got a film that relied on the acting of its star to a surprising degree. It's a much better movie than I expected it to be. I'm a devoted Children of the Corn fan, even when the sequels have been bad I've still enjoyed them. This one wasn't bad."

== Reboot ==
On September 1, 2018, the adaptation rights to the short story "Children of the Corn" returned to its author Stephen King. In 2020, a remake of the franchise was announced to be in development, which was eventually released in 2023 to negative reviews.
