= Guy Magar =

American director and screenwriter (born 1948)

Guy Magar is an American director and screenwriter, born in Cairo, Egypt, in 1948. He directed television series before he transitioned to feature films, such as Our Family Honor and Riptide. An independent director, he is best known for having directed films such as Retribution (1987), Lookin' Italian (1994), Stepfather III (1992), and Children of the Corn: Revelation (2001). He wrote his autobiography in 2011 called Kiss Me Quick Before I Shoot.
