= John Franklin (actor) =

American actor (born 1959)

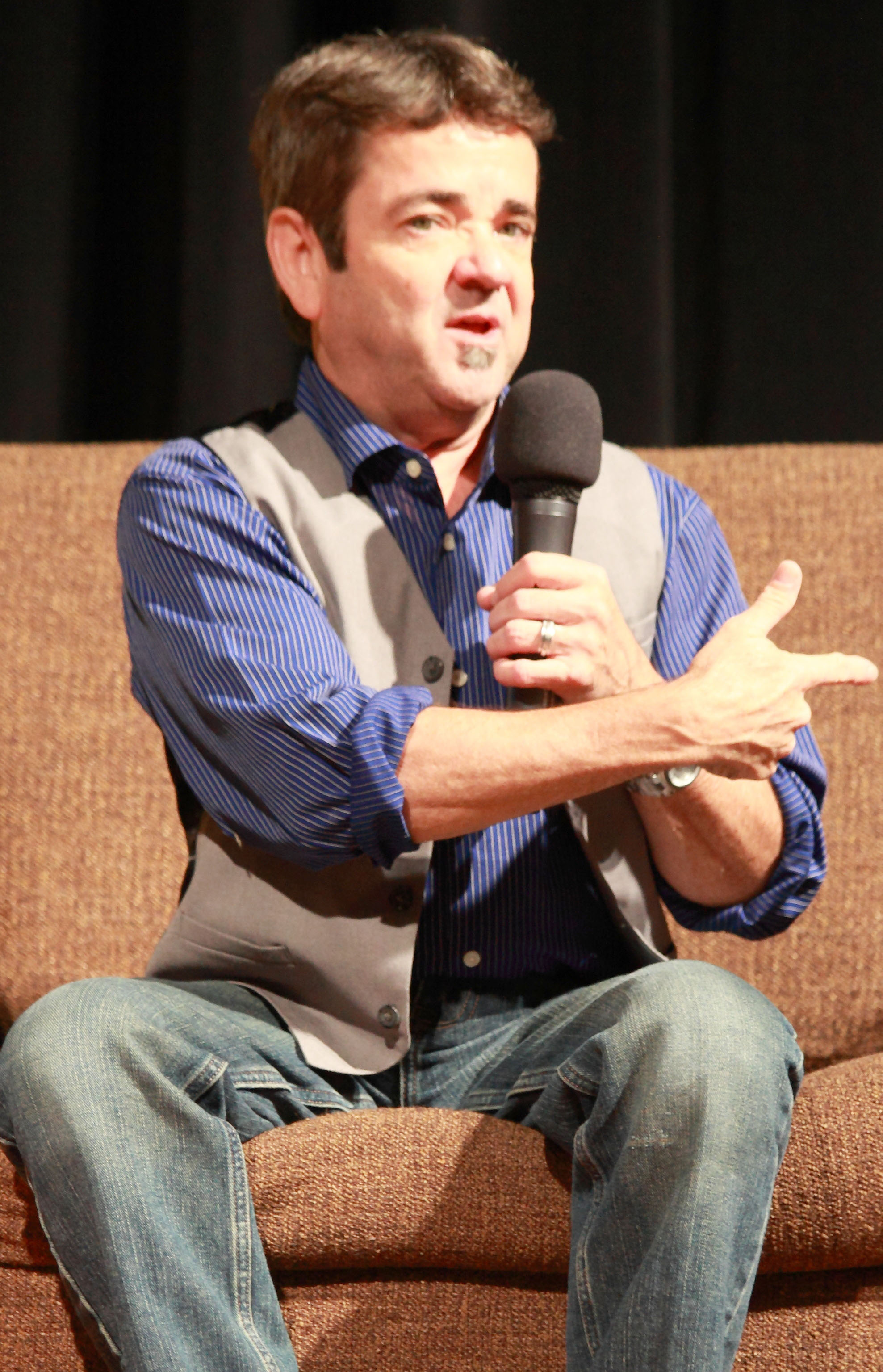
- John Franklin in 2014
- Born: John Paul Salapatek; June 16, 1959 (age 67); Blue Island, Illinois, U.S.
- Education: Dwight D. Eisenhower High School; University of Illinois
- Occupations: Actor; writer; teacher
- Years active: 1983–2004, 2014–present
- Height: 5 ft (1.52 m)
- Spouse: David White (m. 2008)

John Franklin (born John Paul Salapatek; June 16, 1959) is an American actor, writer and former school teacher. He is best known for playing Isaac Chroner in Children of the Corn (1984), and Cousin Itt in The Addams Family (1991).

== Early life ==
John Paul Salapatek was born on June 16, 1959 in Blue Island, Illinois, a southern suburb of Chicago. As a child, Franklin had a growth hormone deficiency; as a result, his adult height is "barely 5 feet", or roughly 152 centimeters.

In 1977, John graduated from Dwight D. Eisenhower High School. He graduated from the University of Illinois in 1983 with a BFA in theater and teaching.

== Career ==
In 1983, John Franklin moved to Los Angeles, California to pursue a career in acting. He appeared in commercials before successfully auditioning for the role of Isaac in Stephen King's Children of the Corn.

After Children of the Corn, Franklin went on to guest star in two episodes of the kids' variety show Kids Incorporated, "The Leprechaun" and "Space Case." He appeared in many commercials before guest starring on Highway to Heaven as Arnie, a mentally handicapped teenage runaway. He also played "Walkabout-Chucky" during the 'Good Guy' doll commercial in the 1988 movie Child's Play.

In 1991, Franklin landed the role of Cousin Itt in The Addams Family and reprised the role in 1993's Addams Family Values. Throughout the 1990s, Franklin appeared as a guest on several TV shows, including Chicago Hope and Star Trek: Voyager. He co-starred with David Morse in the independent 1997 film George B. and with Steve Guttenberg in Disney's TV movie Tower of Terror the same year.

In 1999, Franklin reprised his debut role, Isaac, in Children of the Corn 666: Isaac's Return, co-writing the script with his cousin Tim Sulka. In 2000, he landed a small role in Python and co-starred as Morluv in The Christmas Secret.

Franklin formerly worked as an English teacher at Golden Valley High School in Santa Clarita, California. He explained,

After the events of 9/11, I saw the shallowness of showbiz and felt a great desire to leave a greater legacy than just being Cousin Itt. Teaching seemed to be a perfect fit for my theatrical talents and to touch many lives."

At the end of the 2015–16 school year, Franklin announced to the students and staff of Golden Valley High School that he would be retiring from teaching to reprise his career as an actor and writer. He later was reported to be working on several projects, including a young adult novel.

== Personal life ==
In 2008, John married David White, whom he had previously met through mutual friends.

== Filmography ==
Year	Title	Role	Notes
1984	Children of the Corn	Isaac Chroner	
1986	Highway to Heaven	Arnie	Episode: "Alone"
1986	The Kingdom Chums: Little David's Adventure	Magical Mose	Television film; voice role
1988	A Night at the Magic Castle	Twit	
1988	Beauty and the Beast	Young Vincent	Episode: "Promises of Someday"
1988	Child's Play	Walkabout Chucky	Voice
1988	Andy Colby's Incredible Adventure	The Gatekeepers dog	
1991	The Addams Family	Cousin Itt	
1993	Addams Family Values	Cousin Itt	
1994	Tammy and the T-Rex	Bobby	
1996	Chicago Hope	Jimmy Dunston	Episode: "V-Fibbing"
1997	George B.	Little Mike	
1997	Tower of Terror	Dewey Todd	
1997	Wag the Dog	Jockey No. 1	
1998	The Killing Grounds	Owner	
1999	Children of the Corn 666: Isaac's Return	Isaac Chroner	Direct-to-video; also co-writer
2000	Python	Floyd Fuller	
2000	Star Trek: Voyager	Kipp	Episode: "Critical Care"
2000	The Christmas Secret	Morluv	Television film
2004	Tales of a Fly on the Wall	Master Keldar	Television film
2014	Hag	Marriage counselor	Short film
2015	Hell's Kitty	Isaiah	Episode: "The Medium"
2017	Brooklyn Nine-Nine	Christina "Tina" Boyle	Episode: "Chasing Amy" (credited as "Josh Franklin")
2018	Fresh Off the Boat	Lorenzo	Episode: "Measure Twice, Cut Once"
2018	Hell's Kitty	Isaiah	
