= Kandyse McClure =

Canadian actress (born 1980)

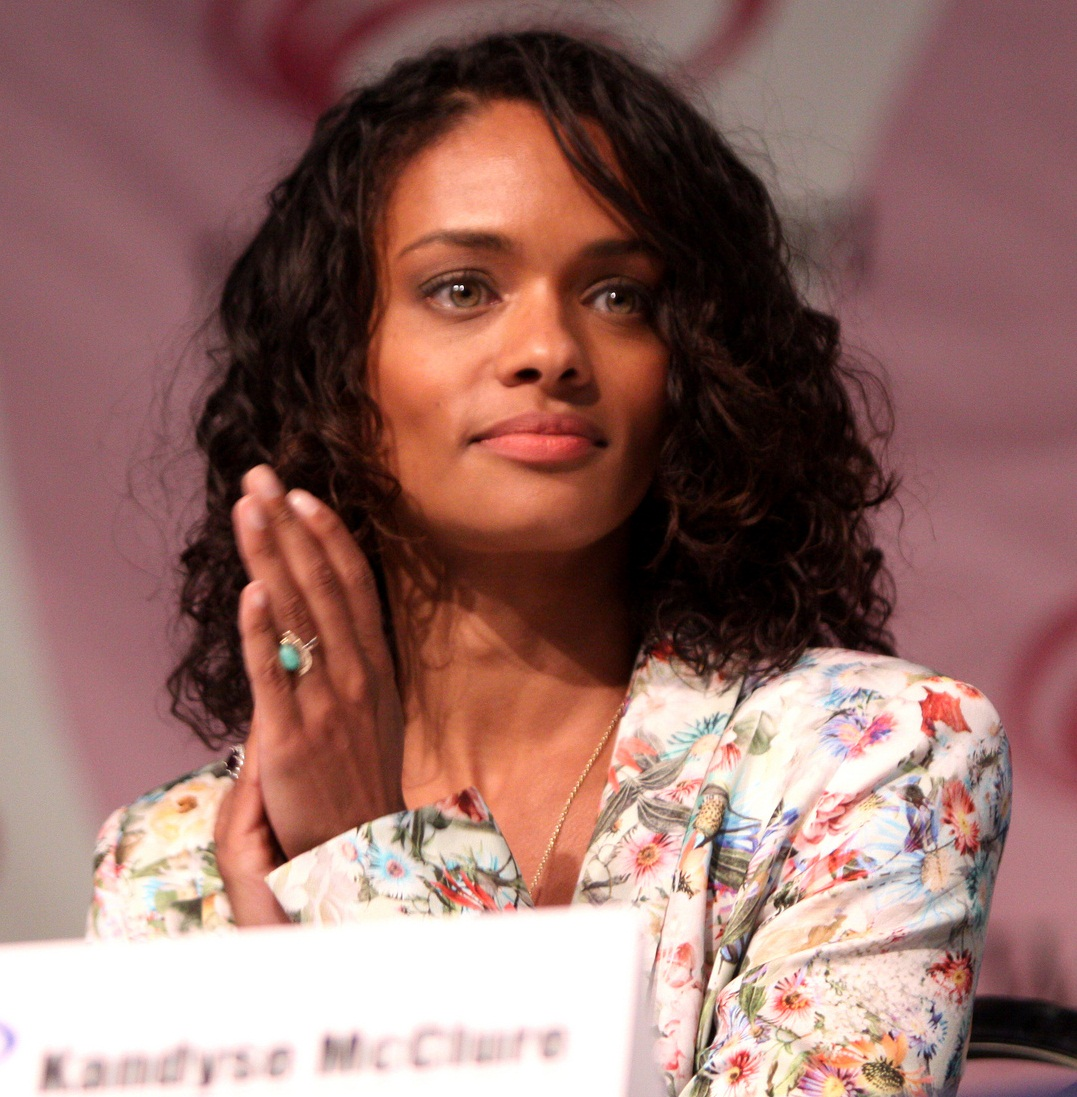
- McClure in 2013
- Born: Candice McClure; 22 March 1980 (age 46); Durban, South Africa
- Occupation: Actress
- Years active: 1999–present
- Spouse: Ian Cylenz Lee
- Website: kandysemcclure.com

Candice McClure (born 22 March 1980), known professionally as Kandyse McClure, is a Canadian actress. She gained prominence through her roles in the Fox Family series Higher Ground (2000), the NBC and Syfy adaptations of Stephen King's Carrie (2002) and Children of the Corn (2009), and as Anastasia Dualla in Battlestar Galactica (2004–2009), also on Syfy. She led the film Sew the Winter to My Skin (2018).

McClure was in the main casts of Persons Unknown (2010) and Ghost Wars (2018), also on NBC and Syfy. She had a recurring role as Dr. Clementine Chasseur in the Netflix series Hemlock Grove (2013).

== Early life ==
Candice McClure was born in the Greenwood Park area of North Durban, South Africa. Her mother is an educator and her father is a musician. From the age of four, McClure moved back and forth between South Africa and Canada. She completed her secondary education at West Vancouver Secondary School in 1998. McClure was cast in a production of Athol Fugard's Valley Song at the age of 17.

== Career ==
McClure's first television appearance was a lead role with Lou Diamond Phillips in the 1999 television film In a Class of His Own that was followed by the Fox Family teen drama Higher Ground and the NBC Saturday-morning series Just Deal, both of which premiered in 2000. The year 2000 was also the time period when McClure played a recurring role in the Canadian drama television series Da Vinci’s Inquest.

In 2002, McClure portrayed the recurring role of Elizabeth Munroe on Showtime's Jeremiah. Also in that year, the actress played the role of Sue Snell in the television film remake of Stephen King's novel Carrie. Also in 2002, McClure guest starred as Annie Fisher in two episodes of James Cameron's science fiction drama television series Dark Angel on Fox.

From 2003 to 2009 , McClure played the role as Anastasia "Dee" Dualla on the Sci Fi Channel series Battlestar Galactica. McClure's character, a Petty Officer Second Class in the Colonial Fleet, has never appeared in the original 1978 series, but was initially an analogue of Sarah Rush's original series character Flight Corporal Rigel. McClure was a regular cast member of the series until January 2009.

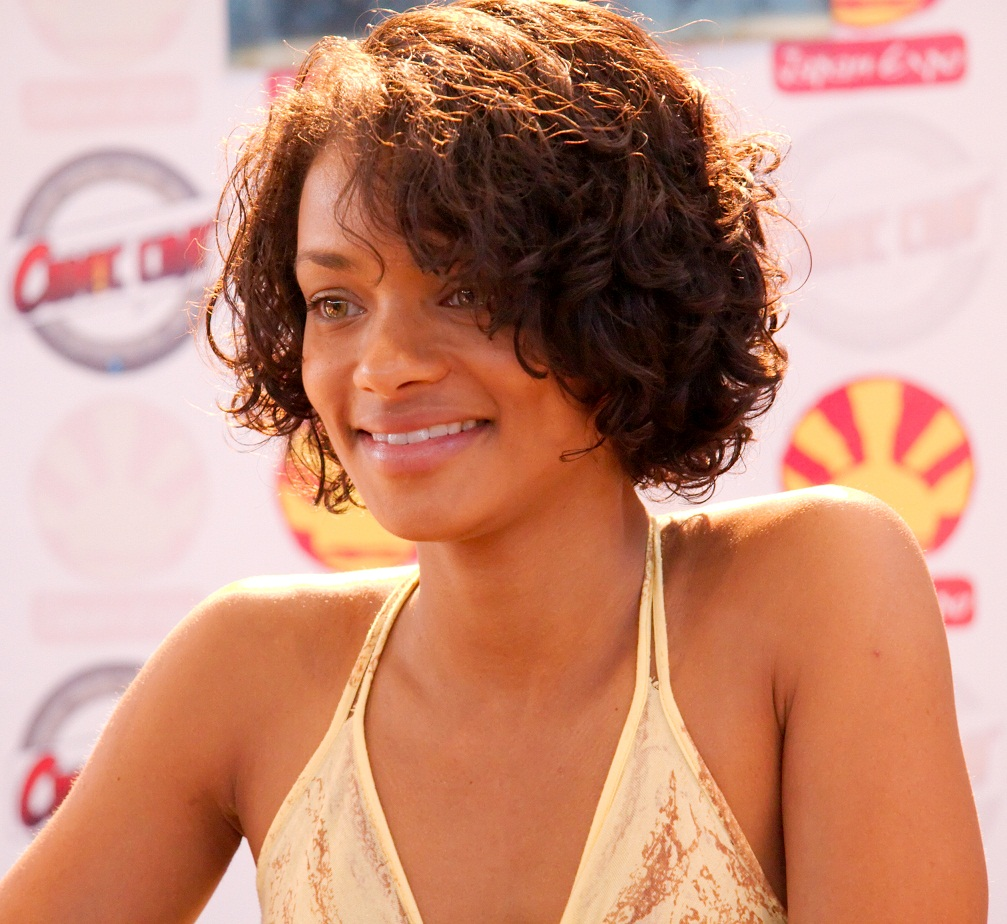
McClure at the Japan Expo 2009 in Paris, France

McClure then appeared in a 2009 television adaptation of King's Children of the Corn and the Carl Bessai feature film from the same year Cole. In 2010 the television series Persons Unknown, in which McClure co-starred, premiered, but the series was not renewed for a second season after it was initially picked up by NBC.

In 2011 McClure played the girlfriend of Stuart Davis in the independent short film Just Be Yourself, a comedy about a desperate man who is offered a job to "just be himself." McClure then joined Davis again in 2011 to co-host the second season of the late-night HDNet program Sex, God, Rock 'n' Roll. In 2012 McClure joined the cast of Netflix original series Hemlock Grove (premiered in January 2013) and completed the feature film Broken Kingdom (alongside Rachael Leigh Cook). McClure has also appeared in other television programs, such as Whistler, Andromeda, Jake 2.0, Smallville, and Reaper.

On 2 February 2016, Historica Canada featured Viola Desmond in the 82nd Heritage Minute, to mark the beginning of Black History Month. The video was filmed on location in High River, Alberta in June 2015. It features Kandyse McClure as Viola Desmond, a civil rights activist and entrepreneur who challenged segregation in Nova Scotia in the 1940s.

== Personal life ==
As of 2013, McClure continues to work with the non-profit organization CARE Canada to address poverty in the world's developing regions. As of 2013, McClure resides in Vancouver, British Columbia.

McClure is married to musician Ian Cylenz Lee. He proposed to her when they were visiting her family in South Africa in December 2012.

== Filmography ==
=== Film ===
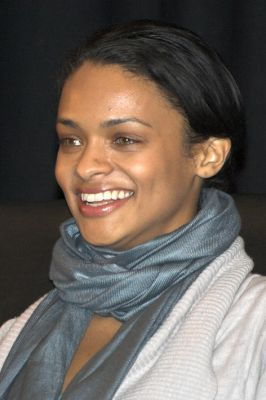
McClure at Battlestar Starfury in London, December 2008

Year	Title	Role	Notes
2000	Romeo Must Die	Store Clerk	
2001	See Spot Run	Attractive Woman	
2008	Barbie in A Christmas Carol	Catherine	Voice role; direct-to-video film
2009	Cole	Serafina	
2009	Sing Along with Barbie	Additional voices	
2010	Barbie: A Fashion Fairytale	Grace	Voice role; direct-to-video film
2010	Mother's Day	Gina Jackson	
2012	Broken Kingdom	Jessica	
2015	Seventh Son	Sarikin	
2015	Careful What You Wish For	Angie Alvarez	
2018	Sew the Winter to My Skin	Golden Eyes	
2020	Love, Guaranteed	Arianna Silver	
2021	Demonic	Sam	

=== Television ===
Year	Title	Role	Notes
1999	In a Class of His Own	Brandy	Television film
2000	2gether	Danielle	Television film
2000	The Spiral Staircase	Monica	Television film
2000	Higher Ground	Katherine Ann 'Kat' Cabot	Main role
2000	Level 9	Megan	Episode: "Ten Little Hackers"
2000	Da Vinci's Inquest	Lily	Episode: "It's a Bad Corner"
2001	Passion and Prejudice	Tamara	Television film
2001	Return to Cabin by the Lake	Jade	Television film
2001	The Outer Limits	Brianna Lake	Episode: "Abduction"
2001	Just Deal	Kim	3 episodes
2002	Framed	As herself	Television film
2002	Carrie	Sue Snell	Television film
2002	Mysterious Ways	Julie	Episode: "A Man of God"
2002	Dark Angel	Annie Fisher	2 episodes
2002	L.A. Law: The Movie	Yvonne	Television film
2002	Jeremiah	Elizabeth	Recurring role, 7 episodes
2003	The Twilight Zone	Gwen	Episode: "Fair Warning"
2003	Black Sash	N/A	Episode: "Jump Start"
2003	Hollywood Wives: The New Generation	Saffron	Television film
2003	Battlestar Galactica	Anastasia "Dee" Dualla	TV miniseries
2003	Jake 2.0	Anna	Episode: "The Prince and the Revolution"
2003–2005	Da Vinci's Inquest	Marla	Recurring role, 16 episodes
2004	Andromeda	Zara	Episode: "The Others"
2004–2009	Battlestar Galactica	Anastasia "Dee" Dualla	Main role
2005	Smallville	Harmony	Episode: "Spirit"
2006	Whistler	Lisa	Recurring role, 6 episodes
2006	Santa Baby	Donna Louise Campbell	Television film
2007	Battlestar Galactica: Razor	Anastasia "Dee" Dualla	Television film
2008	Sanctuary	Meg	Episodes: "Sanctuary for All: Part 1", "Fata Morgana"
2008	Reaper	Cassidy	3 episodes
2009	Children of the Corn	Vicky Stanton	Television film
2010	The Client List	Laura	Television film
2010	Persons Unknown	Erika Taylor	Main role
2012	Just Be Yourself	Glenda	Television film
2012	Republic of Doyle	Sabrina McCarthy	Episode: "One Angry Jake"
2012	Aladdin and the Death Lamp	Shifa	Television film
2012	Alphas	Agnes Walker	Episode: "The Devil Will Drag You Under"
2012–2013	Arctic Air	Shontal	4 episodes
2013	Hemlock Grove	Dr. Clementine Chasseur	Recurring role (season 1), 10 episodes
2013	Haven	Carrie Benson	Episode: "Lay Me Down"
2016	Supernatural	Sheriff A. Tyson	Episode: "The Chitters"
2017–2018	Ghost Wars	Dr. Landis Barker	Main role
2017–2018	The Good Doctor	Celez	Episodes: "Not Fake", "Smile"
2019	Limetown	Lia's girlfriend	2 episodes
2019	V Wars	Claire O'Hagan	3 episodes
2020	Charmed	The Guardian	Recurring role, 5 episodes
2021	The Flash	Xotar	Episode: "Armageddon, Part 2"
2022	Snowpiercer	Tail Boss	Episode: "Ouroboros"
2022	Motherland: Fort Salem	Nicte Batan	3 episodes
2022	The Imperfects	Dr Monday	Episode: "The Devil You Know"
2023	Family Law	Jessie	Episode: "Wicked Games"
2023–present	Virgin River	Kaia Bryant	Main role; (Season 5–present)

== Awards and nominations ==
- Leo Awards; Nominated in 2003 (Best Supporting Performance by a Female: Feature Length Drama) for her role in Carrie, and nominated again in 2010 (Best Lead Performance by a Female: Feature Length Drama) for her role in Cole.
- Peabody Awards, Peabody Award for Excellence in Television, 2005, Battlestar Galactica R&D TV in Association with NBC Universal Television Studio, Sci Fi Channel
