= Donald P. Borchers =

American film director, producer

- Born: United States
- Occupations: Producer, screenwriter, film director
- Years active: 1975–present

Donald P. Borchers is a film producer, director and screenwriter.

== Biography ==
Donald P. Borchers is an American producer. Borchers was a production associate at Avco Embassy Pictures in the early 1980s.

An independent production deal with New World Pictures resulted in Angel (1984), Children of the Corn (1984) and other films.

Borchers founded Planet Productions Corp., and went on to produce Two Moon Junction (1988), Leprechaun 2 (1994), and others. He produced three films for Steven Spielberg's Amblin Playhouse television series and served as an adjunct professor at the University of Southern California School of Cinema/Television.

== Archives ==
The moving image collection of Donald P. Borchers is held at the Academy Film Archive. The film collection at the Academy Film Archive is complemented by the Donald P. Borchers papers held at the academy's Margaret Herrick Library.

== Filmography ==
=== Film director ===
Year	Film
1989	Grave Secrets
2001	Perfect Fit
2009	Children of the Corn

=== Screenwriter ===
Year	Film
1986	Vamp
1993	Jailbait
2009	Children of the Corn

=== Film producer ===
Year	Film
1981	Fear No Evil
1982	The Beastmaster
1983	Triumphs of a Man Called Horse
1984	Angel
1984	Children of the Corn
1984	Crimes of Passion
1985	Tuff Turf
1986	Vamp
1988	Two Moon Junction
1989	Far from Home
1991	Desire and Hell at Sunset Motel
1991	Highlander II: The Quickening
1991	Motorama
1992	Meatballs 4
1992	Samantha
1993	Doppelganger
1993	Jailbait
1994	Leprechaun 2
1994	Criminal Passion
1995	The Stranger
1995	The Demolitionist
1995	Voodoo
1995	Number One Fan
1996	Little Witches
1997	Moonbase
2009	The Tomb
2020	Children of the Corn

=== Television producer ===
Year	Film
1975-77	Beyond Our Control
1992	The Habitation of Dragons
1992	The Water Engine
1992	The Heart of Justice
1995	Tall, Dark and Deadly
2009	Children of the Corn

== Other projects ==
From 1984 to 1996, Borchers served as an adjunct professor at the Peter Stark Producing Program, a Master of Fine Arts program in the USC School of Cinematic Arts teaching CIN 565, the budgeting and scheduling requisite class. In 2016, Borchers started a YouTube channel.
