= Children of the Corn V: Fields of Terror =

1998 film by Ethan Wiley

- Promotional release poster
- Directed by: Ethan Wiley
- Written by: Ethan Wiley
- Based on: Children of the Corn by Stephen King
- Produced by: Jeff Geoffray; Walter Josten
- Starring: Stacy Galina; Alexis Arquette; Adam Wylie; Greg Vaughan; Eva Mendes; Ahmet Zappa; Angela Jones
- Cinematography: David Lewis
- Edited by: Peter Devaney Flanagan
- Music by: Paul Rabjohns
- Production company: Blue Rider Pictures
- Distributed by: Dimension Home Video (Buena Vista Home Entertainment)
- Release date: June 21, 1998
- Running time: 83 minutes
- Country: United States
- Language: English

Children of the Corn V: Fields of Terror is a 1998 American supernatural slasher film written and directed by Ethan Wiley. It stars Stacy Galina, Alexis Arquette, Adam Wylie, Eva Mendes, and Ahmet Zappa. It is the fifth installment of the Children of the Corn film series. The leader of the cult in this installment, Ezekiel, is possessed by the enigmatic demon, "He Who Walks Behind the Rows". It was released straight-to-video by Dimension Home Video on June 21, 1998.

The film was followed by a sequel, titled Children of the Corn 666: Isaac's Return (1999).

== Plot ==
A group of teenagers becomes lost in middle America and arrives in Divinity Falls, where forgotten children have taken on the duty of serving "He Who Walks Behind the Rows". The teenagers have less than a week to leave the town. However, they find that their car is destroyed, and the children are held accountable. Allison, the leader of the teenagers, overhears that the children are the adopted wards of Luke Enright, a madman who considers himself the saviour of the children and the earthly representative of He Who Walks Behind the Rows. Upon remembering that her brother is also among them, Allison and the rest decide to go to Enright's farm to discover the truth behind the bizarre cult.

Upon arrival, one of the children, Ezekiel, stops the group to inform them that they are on private property and must leave. After a debate, Allison is finally allowed to see Luke. He informs her that her brother is there and agrees to let her see him, only to be rejected by him for leaving him alone with their abusive father. Jacob informs her that he is engaged to a girl named Lily and also states that she is pregnant with his child. Meanwhile, the rest of Allison's group is kept outside, where the men are intimidated by a physically powerful and exceptionally tall teen named Jared.

Ezekiel holds a ceremony for the annual sacrifice to He Who Walks Behind the Rows, which involves an 18-year-old child leaping into a flaming corn silo where the god is supposed to dwell. Jacob is chosen, but he refuses and tells Ezekiel that his religion is false, angering him. Kir, one of the "outsiders", agrees to become a part of the cult after reading a part of their "Bible" earlier. After Jacob attempts to leave, Kir chooses to take the fateful course, climbs to the silo, and leaps to a fiery demise. The rest of the group wishes to leave the town, but Allison refuses to leave without Jacob. They leave her, and she eventually reads a message Jacob left her in his Bible. It translates to "Help", and she realizes he wants to escape. She enlists the help of the sheriff to stop Luke and Ezekiel.

Greg, who has developed a crush on Allison, chooses to go back and help her, and the rest decide to go as well. Allison, with the aid of the sheriff and the fire department, attempts to stop the silo and arrest Luke. While trying to extinguish the silo, the flames come alive and kill the two firefighters, and Luke kills the sheriff and apparently himself after his head splits open and a burst of flame shoots through. Ezekiel reveals that Luke had been dead for years, and he is the children's true leader. After killing two of the deranged kids, Allison meets her friends, and an all-out battle erupts between them and the kids, ending with the deaths of everyone, except Allison. Allison finds her brother, and before dying, he tells her how to stop He Who Walks Behind the Rows. Ezekiel tries to kill Allison, but after a struggle, she sends him falling into the silo to a violent, fiery death. She then dumps fertilizer into the silo, blowing it up and killing He Who Walks Behind the Rows.

Allison then goes to Lily's house. Lily's parents tell Allison that Lily isn't ready to raise a baby because she is a baby herself. Lily tells Allison that it's for the best that she adopts her baby. As the film ends, the baby is seen being comforted by song, with the green-orange light of the silo fire burning in his eyes.

== Cast ==
- Stacy Galina as Alison
- Adam Wylie as Ezekiel
- Alexis Arquette as Greg
- Eva Mendes as Kir
- Greg Vaughan as Tyrus
- Angela Jones as Charlotte
- Ahmet Zappa as Lazlo
- Fred Williamson as Sheriff Skaggs
- Davino Buzzotta as Jacob
- Olivia Burnette as Lily
- David Carradine as Luke
- Aaron Jackson as Zane
- Matthew Tait as Jared
- Kane Hodder as a bartender

== Production ==
The film began development under the title Fields of Screams, but according to director and writer Ethan Wiley, Miramax wanted to change the title to avoid brand confusion with Dimension Films's Scream series. As the prior Children of the Corn films didn't have much continuity and only the loosest of connections to each other, Wiley described the process of going back to the original short story and combining it with Wiley's fascination with cults and how they function and operate, as he felt that was an area not necessarily explored by prior entries.

Principal photography took place in July 1997, in Oxnard and Camarillo, California.

== Release ==
=== Home media ===
The film, like its last two predecessors, did not receive a theatrical release but instead went straight-to-video on June 21, 1998, on the VHS format. The 1998 VHS release was handled by Buena Vista Home Entertainment (under the Dimension Home Video banner). In Australia, it was released on VHS in approximately late 1998, also via Buena Vista Home Entertainment. A subtitled Dutch VHS was released in 1999 by RCV. In the US, the film was released on DVD in 2001 by Buena Vista Home Entertainment.

Dimension Films was sold by The Walt Disney Company in 2005, with its parent label Miramax then being sold by Disney in 2010. That same year, private equity firm Filmyard Holdings took control of Miramax and the pre-October 2005 library of Dimension. Filmyard licensed the home media rights for various Dimension/Miramax titles to Echo Bridge Entertainment. The film debuted on the Blu-ray format for the first time on May 15, 2011, via Echo Bridge. That month, Echo Bridge additionally included it in a double feature with its sequel Children of the Corn 666: Isaac's Return (1999), also making its Blu-ray debut. In 2011, Filmyard Holdings licensed the Miramax library and pre-October 2005 Dimension library to streaming site Netflix. This deal included Children of the Corn V: Fields of Terror, and ran for five years, eventually ending on June 1, 2016.

In March 2016, Filmyard Holdings sold Miramax and the pre-October 2005 Dimension library to Qatari company beIN Media Group. Then in April 2020, ViacomCBS (now known as Paramount Skydance) bought a 49% stake in Miramax, which gave them the rights to the Miramax library and the pre-October 2005 Dimension library. Children of the Corn V: Fields of Terror is among the 700 titles they acquired in the deal, and since April 2020, the film has been distributed by Paramount Pictures.

In late 2020, Paramount Home Entertainment began reissuing many of the Dimension/Miramax titles they acquired, and on September 22, 2020, they included it on a four movie pack. This release included three other Children of the Corn films from Dimension that were released between 1995 and 1999 (Children of the Corn III: Urban Harvest. Children of the Corn IV: The Gathering and Children of the Corn 666: Isaac's Return). The film was later made available on Paramount's free streaming service Pluto TV.

== Reception ==
Children of the Corn V: Fields of Terror holds a 14% rating on Rotten Tomatoes based on seven reviews. Guy McPherson of Apollo Guide Review noted that, "If you have seen the first four, go for it. After all, it is the newest and most shocking chapter."

== See also ==
- Children of the Corn (film series)
- List of adaptations of works by Stephen King
