= Children of the Corn: Revelation =

2001 American horror film directed by Guy Magar

- Promotional release poster
- Directed by: Guy Magar
- Written by: S.J. Smith
- Based on: Children of the Corn by Stephen King
- Produced by: Joel Soisson; Michael Leahy
- Starring: Claudette Mink; Kyle Cassie; Michael Ironside; Crystal Lowe
- Cinematography: Danny Nowak
- Edited by: Kirk M. Morri
- Music by: Stephen Edwards
- Production company: Miramax; Creeper Films; Neo Art & Logic
- Distributed by: Dimension Films
- Release date: October 9, 2001
- Running time: 82 minutes
- Country: United States
- Language: English

Children of the Corn: Revelation is a 2001 American slasher horror film directed by Guy Magar. It is the seventh installment of the Children of the Corn film series. The plot follows a woman who travels to Omaha, Nebraska in search of her grandmother, and finds her apartment building to be overrun with mysterious children who seem to be emerging from the adjacent corn field. The film stars Claudette Mink, Kyle Cassie and Michael Ironside.

The film was followed by a made-for-television remake of the original, Children of the Corn (2009).

== Plot ==
Jamie Lowell (Claudette Mink) comes to Omaha, Nebraska, after numerous phone calls to her grandmother have gone unanswered. Her grandmother's apartment building, which is built next to a cornfield, appears to be empty, except for two young, mysterious children who roam about. Jamie discovers that her grandmother has received a notice of eviction. She goes to see Detective Armbrister, who is not much help. While at the local grocery store, Jamie has an encounter with the children from the building, but they do not speak to her. Outside, she sees a priest standing in the street, staring at her. She returns to her grandmother's apartment to discover a message: "Jamie go home".

Jamie questions the building manager, Jerry Ulrich who is of no help. Jamie investigates in the basement and finds a crop of carrots and tomatoes. She flees when she hears a group of children laughing. She runs into a man with a gun, who tells her to keep out of the basement. She later meets two more tenants, an old man in a wheelchair, who swears at everyone, and a young woman named Tiffany (Crystal Lowe), a stripper. Jerry invites Jamie to a BBQ on the roof, to which she agrees. On the roof, Jerry takes a bite of corn and discovers there is blood inside. He is then shoved off the roof by the two children. When Jamie arrives, he is nowhere to be found, and she sees the priest watching her from the ground.

Jamie has a nightmare in which her grandmother was lured from her house by a strange voice to railroad tracks. The next day, Jamie goes to see Det. Armbrister who reveals Jamie's grandmother was part of a religious cult when she was a child. The kids, who were led by a boy-preacher named Abel, committed suicide by entering a tent and setting it ablaze. Only Jamie's grandmother survived. Jamie's grandmother's apartment is built upon the site of the fire. This is ironic, because Jamie's parents were killed in a house fire.

Tiffany returns home and, while taking a bath, she is attacked by one of the children who uses corn to strangle her, before taking her body. Det. Armbrister and Jamie arrive at the apartment, but don't notice Tiffany's body lying nearby in the cornfield. Later, after Det. Armbrister leaves, the old man in the wheelchair is attacked by the kids and is pushed through a stair balcony and falls to his death.

Jamie returns to the grocery store, which is ransacked. She spots a girl wearing her grandmother's hat and chases after her, failing to notice the storeowner's severed head inside a drink cooler. Jamie returns to the apartment, where she runs into the man with the gun. He reveals that everyone else has disappeared and that he is leaving. As he makes his escape, the kids trap him in an elevator and scare him so much, that he has a fatal heart attack. The kids then drag off his body.

The priest arrives and tells her about the history of Gatlin, and the creature known as "He Who Walks Behind the Rows", who is apparently the devil. The priest tells Jamie that her grandmother is dead and that if she does not leave, she too will be killed. The priest then leaves. Some of the children arrive and take Jamie down to the basement, where there are now rows of corn growing. Abel appears and the children close in on her. One of the children reveals herself to be Jamie's grandmother and though she is a child, speaks in the voice of an old woman. Jamie flees, but Abel uses his power to prevent her from leaving. Cornered, Jamie faces Abel and the children, who ask her to join them. Jamie agrees, but it is only a distraction and she causes a gas explosion, but Abel is unscathed.

Abel uses corn stalks to tie down Jamie, but she is rescued by Det. Armbrister. They both manage to escape before the apartment explodes and destroys the corn as well. It is implied that the souls of the children were freed and Abel was killed.

== Cast ==
- Claudette Mink as Jamie Lowell
- Kyle Cassie as Detective Armbrister
- Troy Yorke as Jerry Ulrich
- Michael Rogers as Stan
- Crystal Lowe as Tiffany
- Michael Ironside as The Priest
- Louise Grant as Hattie Soames
- Sean Smith as Boy Preacher Abel
- Jeff Ballard as Boy #1
- Taylor Hobbs as Girl #1
- Brad Mooney as Boy #2
- Maxine McKay as Girl #2

== Reception ==
Adam Tyner of DVD Talk rated it 2/5 stars and wrote: "Director Guy Magar took the traditional no-budget, direct-to-video, paint-by-numbers approach, resulting in an uninvolving, unremarkable film that doesn't offer even the most fleeting glimpse of terror or suspense". Total Film ranked it number 49 out of 50 in their list of Stephen King adaptations.

Film scholar Mark Browning noted the film's employment of several "macabre" images and praised its cinematography, but wrote that "inconsistencies in the plot abound".

== See also ==
- List of adaptations of works by Stephen King

== Sources ==
- Browning, Mark (2011). Stephen King on the Small Screen. Intellect Books. ISBN 978-1-841-50412-4.
- Muir, John Kenneth (2023). Horror Films of 2000-2009. Jefferson, North Carolina: McFarland. ISBN 978-1-476-64450-9.
