= Daniel Newman (American actor) =

American actor

- Born: Daniel Christopher Newman; June 14, 1981 (age 45); Atlanta, Georgia, U.S.
- Occupations: Actor; model; musician

Daniel Christopher Newman (born June 14, 1981) is an American actor, model, and musician, with work appearing on the Twilight film soundtrack, and several television series' soundtracks, and with acting roles on The Walking Dead, The Vampire Diaries, and Homeland.

== Early life and career ==
Daniel Newman was born in Atlanta, and then when his parents divorced moved with his mother to a small farm town in Georgia. He was an extra on a few TV shows filmed in Georgia, as well as working in theatre productions in Atlanta. When he was older he then moved to Brooklyn to pursue music. He studied at Yale University for a short period, before moving to New York City to continue a music career. He struggled as a musician for a short time, before meeting photographer Bruce Weber. He began modelling, appearing on magazine covers and various other advertising. He modelled for Calvin Klein, Christian Dior, Louis Vuitton, and Tommy Hilfiger. He also appeared on the cover of the fashion photographer Thomas Knights's "Red Hot Exposed" 2017 calendar and redheaded art campaign.

While in New York, he enrolled in William Espers acting school to study acting. He was cast for guest spots on American television shows such as 7th Heaven (1997), One Tree Hill (2006), Heroes (2009), and The Vampire Diaries (2012). He appeared briefly as one of Bane's thugs in the 2012 film The Dark Knight Rises. In 2016, he joined the cast of The Walking Dead as a recurring character named Daniel.

== Personal life ==
On January 15, 2009, he was walking across an intersection in Hollywood and was hit by a drunk driver, who did not stop. He was sent to the Intensive Care Unit at Cedars-Sinai Hospital Los Angeles. The doctors gave Newman a 20% chance to live but he survived and made a full recovery.

In March 2017, Newman came out as bisexual, and has made appearances in support of GLAAD and the Human Rights Campaign.

In March 2020, Newman was tested in Atlanta for COVID-19. He had a mild case, and was discharged from the hospital. His test was not processed because his case was mild.

In December 2020, Newman created an OnlyFans account where he would post "PG to maybe R-rated" content, but no pornography, he produces short films with other actors, directors and writers.

== Filmography ==
=== Films ===
Year	Title	Role	Notes
1995	Fluke	School Boy	Uncredited
2001	How High	Video Fighter	Uncredited
2005	Shooting Gallery	Easy	
2006	Broken Bridges	Scott	
2009	Road Trip: Beer Pong	Raz-R	Direct-to-video
2009	The Imaginarium of Doctor Parnassus	Gavin	Uncredited
2009	Falling Up	Jake Weaver	Direct-to-video
2009	Dorian Gray	Michael Radley	Uncredited
2009	Cirque du Freak: The Vampire's Assistant	Pete	Uncredited
2012	The Dark Knight Rises	Thug in Basement	
2017	Division 19	Businessman	

=== Television ===
Year	Title	Role	Notes
1993	I'll Fly Away	Lost Boy	Episode: "Small Wishes"
1997	Savannah	Photographer	Episode: "The Gal to Marry Dear Old Dad"
1997	7th Heaven	Guy #2	Episode: "Dangerous Liaisons: Part 1"
2003	Sex and the City	Rock Star	Episode: "The Catch"
2004	Blue Collar TV	Various	Episode: "TV"
2005–2006	Surface	Greg Butler	4 episodes
2006	One Tree Hill	Michael	Episode: "The Show Must Go On"
2008	Fab Five: The Texas Cheerleader Scandal	Trevor	TV movie
2009	Drop Dead Diva	Mike	Episode: "The Magic Bullet"
2009	Children of the Corn	Malachai	TV movie
2009	Heroes	Jimmy Keppler	Episodes: "An Invisible Thread" and "Ink"
2012	The Vampire Diaries	Daniel	Episodes: "Our Town" and "The Ties That Bind"
2012	The Game	Nick	Episode: "Breakthrough. Breakdown? Break-through"
2013	Homeland	Jeff	Episodes: "Tin Man Is Down" and "Game On"
2016–2017	The Walking Dead	Daniel	Recurring role, 10 episodes
2019	EastSiders	Chase	Episodes: "Going Viral" and "Always Upwards"
2021	Loki	Minuteman #18	Episodes: "Glorious Purpose"
