= Reboot (fiction) =

Term used in serial fiction

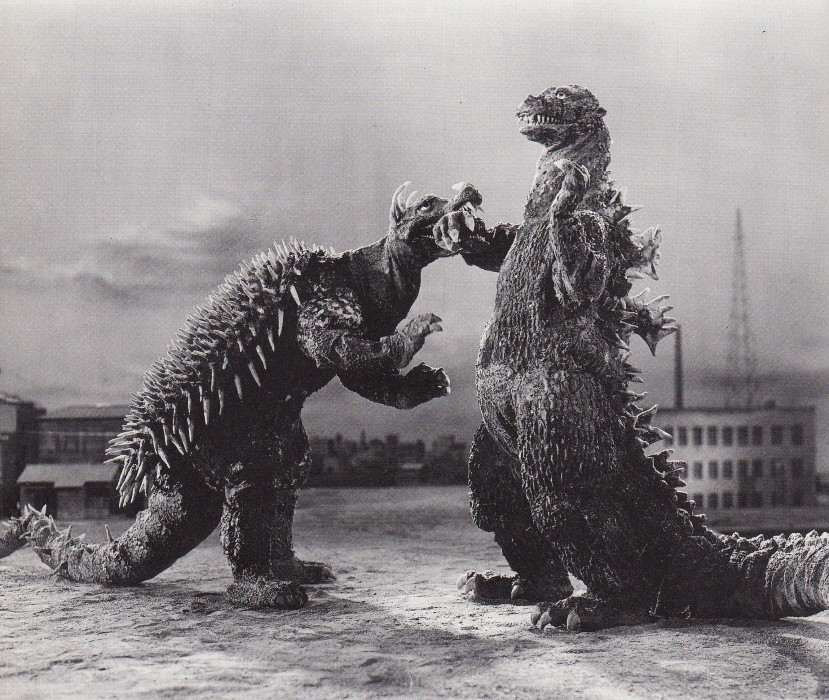
The Godzilla film series, which began in 1954, has been rebooted numerous times. Pictured here is a promotional still for Godzilla Raids Again (1955).

In serial fiction, a reboot is a new start to an established fictional universe, work, or series. A reboot usually discards continuity to re-create its characters, plotlines and backstory from the beginning. It has been described as a way to "rebrand" or "restart an entertainment universe that has already been established".

The term has been criticized for being a vague and "confusing" "buzzword", and a neologism for remake, a concept which has been losing popularity since the 2010s. William Proctor proposes that there is a distinction between reboots, remakes and retcons.

== Origin ==
The term is thought to originate from the computing term reboot, meaning to restart a computer system. There is a change in meaning: the computing term refers to restarting the same program unaltered, while the term discussed here refers to revising a narrative from the beginning. The first known use of reboot applied to an entertainment franchise was in a 1994 Usenet posting.

== Types ==
Say you've had 187 issues of The Incredible Hulk and you decide you're going to introduce a new Issue 1. You pretend like those first 187 issues never happened, and you start the story from the beginning and the slate is wiped clean, and no one blinks. One of the reasons they do that is after 10 years of telling the same story, it gets stale and times change. So we did the cinematic equivalent of a reboot, and by doing that, setting it at the beginning, you're instantly distancing yourself from anything that's come before.

— David S. Goyer, on Batman Begins

Reboots cut out non-essential elements associated with a pre-established franchise and start it anew, distilling it down to the core elements that made the source material popular. For audiences, reboots allow easier entry for newcomers unfamiliar with earlier titles in a series.

=== Comic books ===
In comic books, a long-running title may have its continuity erased to start over from the beginning, enabling writers to redefine characters and open up new story opportunities, allowing the title to bring in new readers. Comic books sometimes use an in-universe explanation for a reboot, such as merging parallel worlds and timelines together, or destroying a fictional universe and recreating it from the beginning.

=== Film ===
With reboots, filmmakers revamp and reinvigorate a film series to attract new fans and stimulate revenue. A reboot can renew interest in a series that has grown stale. Reboots act as safe projects for a studio, since a reboot with an established fanbase is less risky (in terms of expected profit) than an entirely original work, while at the same time allowing the studio to explore new demographics.

=== Television ===
A television series can return to production after cancellation or a long hiatus. Whereas a reboot disregards the previous continuity of a work, the term has also been used as a "catch all" phrase to categorize sequel series or general remakes due to the rise of such productions in the late 2010s.

A related concept is retooling, which is used to substantially change the premise of a series while keeping some of the core characters. Retools are usually part of an effort to forestall cancellation of a still running production.

=== Video games ===
Reboots and remakes are common in the video game industry. Remakes in video games are used to refresh the storyline and elements of the game and to take advantage of technology and features not available at the time of earlier entries.

== Soft reboot ==
A soft reboot is a reboot that shares some continuity with the original series, but that changes the style, tone, or intent. It usually serves to allow writers more creative freedom while mostly maintaining the same setting the audience has grown accustomed to.

In a soft reboot, certain characters, storylines, and background elements from the original are retained, while others are newly created, altered, or added. This approach provides a fresh start while still maintaining ties to the existing continuity. The soft reboot is not the same as installments in a film series that recast actors (like Batman Forever (1995) and Diary of a Wimpy Kid: The Long Haul (2017)), nor is it an installment with new leads and work as entry-levels to its respective franchise (like Jurassic World and Star Wars: The Force Awakens (both 2015)). Examples of soft reboots include Halloween H20: 20 Years Later (1998), Children of the Corn: Genesis (2011), Halloween (2018), and Terminator: Dark Fate (2019). Films that have been debated as soft reboots or sequels include Star Trek (2009) and Mad Max: Fury Road (2015).

== The "gritty reboot" ==
The notion of the "gritty reboot" gained popularity, in which various franchises that often had a lighter tone in their original form were remade in a darker and more mature form. Christopher Nolan's The Dark Knight Trilogy is one of the earlier, more famous, and highly regarded examples, and was followed by gritty reboots of DC's Justice League, the James Bond franchise with Casino Royale in 2006, and others including Bel-Air and A Christmas Carol, among many other examples.

== See also ==
- Artistic license
- Canon (fiction)
- Prequel
- Reset button technique
