= Children of the Corn =

1977 short story by Stephen King

- Short story by Stephen King
- Illustration by Don Punchatz from the Penthouse magazine.
- Country: United States
- Language: English
- Genres: Horror, short story

Publication
- Published in: Penthouse, Night Shift, Stephen King Goes to the Movies
- Media type: Print (hardcover)
- Publication date: 1977 (magazine); 1978 (collection)

"Children of the Corn" is a short story by Stephen King, first published in the March 1977 issue of Penthouse, and later collected in King's 1978 collection Night Shift. The story has been adapted into several films, spawning a horror feature film franchise of the same name beginning in 1984. In 2009, the story was included in the book Stephen King Goes to the Movies.

== Plot ==
In July 1976, Burt and Vicky, a dysfunctional married couple, are driving through rural Nebraska when they accidentally run over a body in the road. Upon examination, Burt finds the boy's throat had already been slit, while the boy's suitcase only holds some clothes and a crucifix made of corn husks. Burt and Vicky agree to report the incident to the police in Gatlin, the nearest town over, and place the body in their car's trunk.

Burt and Vicky arrive to find Gatlin deserted. Abandoned local businesses display prices and calendars more than a decade out of date, and the couple's car is the only one running. The only sound Burt and Vicky hear is the distant laughter of children. Unnerved by the eerie silence, Vicky demands they leave, but Burt insists on continuing his search for an authority figure. After bitterly arguing with Vicky, Burt grabs the car keys from her and goes inside a well-maintained church.

Within the church, Burt finds a disturbing mural of Jesus, and a pipe organ with its keys and stops ripped out and its pipes stuffed with corn husks. He also finds a King James Bible with several pages from the New Testament cut out, as well as a record book listing the births and deaths of various people. Burt realizes that in August 1964, the children of Gatlin killed the town's adults, and in the 12 years since then, no one in town has lived past their 19th birthday.

Vicky begins sounding the car's horn outside. Burt runs out to find the car surrounded by children and teenagers dressed in Amish-style clothing and armed with farm tools. They destroy the car and drag Vicky out. Burt tries to intervene, but he is distracted defending himself before realizing that Vicky is gone. The children then chase Burt until he loses them by hiding in an empty cornfield.

As the sun sets, Burt wanders around until he discovers Vicky's body tied to a cross with barbed wire, her eyes ripped out and replaced with corn silk, and her mouth stuffed with corn husks. He also sees the crucified skeletons of Gatlin's minister and police chief. After this discovery, Burt finds himself trapped by cornfield rows closing up on him and is soon killed by "He Who Walks Behind the Rows", a demonic entity that inhabits the cornfields surrounding the town. Soon after, a harvest moon appears in the sky.

The next day, the children of Gatlin have a meeting. Isaac, their nine-year-old seer, tells them that "He Who Walks Behind the Rows" is displeased by their failure to sacrifice Burt. He punishes them by lowering the "age of favor" to 18 and commands them to "be fruitful and multiply". That night, Malachi (the killer of the boy Burt and Vicki ran over) as well as all of the other 18-year-olds walk into the corn and disappear. The story ends by saying that the corn surrounding Gatlin is pleased.

== Connections to other books ==
Gatlin was mentioned in It. Hemingford Home, a neighboring town to Gatlin, was also the town where Mother Abagail lived and rounded up the good survivors of the super flu in The Stand, and was also the location in 1922. It has also been theorized that Randall Flagg, the main antagonist of The Stand, could be the evil entity called "He Who Walks Behind the Rows" lurking in the background of the short story.

== Adaptations ==
The story was first adapted into a 1983 short film under the name Disciples of the Crow. One year later, the story was adapted into the first feature film, Children of the Corn, starring Peter Horton and Linda Hamilton. Several sequels, a reboot series of two films and two adaptations followed.

=== Original film series ===
- Children of the Corn (1984)
- Children of the Corn II: The Final Sacrifice (1992)
- Children of the Corn III: Urban Harvest (1995)
- Children of the Corn IV: The Gathering (1996)
- Children of the Corn V: Fields of Terror (1998)
- Children of the Corn 666: Isaac's Return (1999)
- Children of the Corn: Revelation (2001)

=== Reboot series ===
- Children of the Corn: Genesis (2011)
- Children of the Corn: Runaway (2018)

=== Other adaptations ===
- Disciples of the Crow (1983)
- Children of the Corn (2009)
- Children of the Corn (2020)

== In popular culture ==
Nu metal band Korn used themes of childhood cruelty on their 1994 debut album, Korn. Their song "Children of the Korn" with Ice Cube from their third album, Follow the Leader, was released in 1998.

In the 2012 animated feature film Wreck-It Ralph, when trying to ease King Candy's rage, Ralph calls the Sugar Rush racers whom he assumes stole his medal "Children of the Candy Corn."

== See also ==
- List of Stephen King films
- Short fiction by Stephen King
