= Children of the Corn: Genesis =

- DVD cover
- Directed by: Joel Soisson
- Written by: Joel Soisson
- Based on: "Children of the Corn" by Stephen King
- Produced by: Aaron Ockman; Joel Soisson
- Starring: Kelen Coleman; Tim Rock; Barbara Nedeljáková; Duane Whitaker; Dusty Burwell; Billy Drago
- Cinematography: Alexandre Lehmann
- Edited by: Philip Mangano
- Music by: Jacob Yoffee
- Distributed by: Dimension Extreme
- Release date: August 30, 2011
- Running time: 81 minutes
- Country: United States
- Language: English

Children of the Corn: Genesis is a 2011 American supernatural horror film written, produced and directed by Joel Soisson. It is the ninth installment and served as a soft reboot of the Children of the Corn film series. The film stars Kelen Coleman, Tim Rock and Billy Drago.

Genesis was released directly to DVD in 2011 through Dimension Films' Extreme label.

The film was followed by its sequel Children of the Corn: Runaway in 2018.

== Plot ==
Tim and Allie's car breaks down and they attempt to find shelter in a remote desert farmhouse after becoming lost. A strange Charles Manson-like character, The Preacher (Billy Drago), allows them inside to use the phone. The couple find out they won't be able to get tow service until the following day. The Preacher and his Ukrainian wife Oksana (also known as Helen) let them stay the night with strict orders to be gone by morning, and not wander "where you are not invited". They find their hosts weird but don't think much of it and head to bed after dinner. Allie wanders off in the middle of the night after using the outhouse, and discovers the garage has been converted into a cult worshipping church. She then stumbles upon a crumbling outbuilding where she hears faint cries coming from a child.

Allie runs back and tells Tim what she witnessed, but at first he doesn't believe her. He agrees to confront the Preacher about the voices, but falls into a hypnotized trance while viewing digital photos in the Preacher's camera. The child then walks into the house and plants a seed inside Allie and disappears before being seen. Tim and Allie try to leave the house, but get locked in the house by a supernatural force. Allie calls the police, but is unsure if she got through as the line gets cut off halfway. Allie falls asleep and dreams about being murdered by children in a cornfield. Allie and Tim wake up to headlights flashing into the room and a cop arrives to check on the house but is thrown into the air and killed by the supernatural force. After witnessing this Tim insists on answers from the Preacher, finding out that the supernatural force needs children to survive and has already planted a seed inside Allie.

Come morning, a parcel delivery driver drops things off at the house. He agrees to give Tim and Allie a ride into town. Tim has a bad feeling about the driver so he takes off with Allie in the abandoned police vehicle instead. They get to the main road. The child in the outbuilding then kills Helen and psychokinetically causes Tim and Allie to have a car accident, in which Tim dies. The parcel driver approaches the accident and brings Allie back to the farmhouse where a group of children and their mothers greet her. In a trance, she sits next to the little child in the outbuilding and begins to sing to him. The child is then seen playing with a doll, then drops it on the floor, which causes the cop's corpse to fall from the sky onto the ground.

== Cast ==
- Kelen Coleman as Allie
- Tim Rock as Tim
- Barbara Nedeljáková as Helen / Oksana
- Billy Drago as Preacher
- Dusty Burwell as The Child
- Duane Whitaker as Pritchett
- J.J. Banicki as Cole

== Release ==
The film was released on DVD and Blu-ray through Dimension Films' Extreme label on August 30, 2011.

== Reception ==
CineMagazine rated the film 2 stars. Dread Central said, "While it isn't anything spectacular, Genesis is one of those low-budget movies you could come across on late night television and easily kill a guiltless 80 minutes with."

== See also ==
- Children of the Corn (film series)
- List of adaptations of works by Stephen King
