= Reportage Press =

Publishing house

Reportage Press was a publishing house specialising in "books on foreign affairs or set in foreign countries, or just books written from a stranger's view."

In reaction to the lack of quality books on foreign affairs, Reportage Press was established in 2007 by two former journalists: Charlotte Eagar, a foreign correspondent who has covered conflicts such as the Iraq War and Balkan wars; and Rosie Whitehouse, a former BBC journalist. They believe these books are newsworthy and want to publish books "that mainstream houses shun in favour of ghosted showbiz autobiographies and TV spin-offs".

At the beginning of 2008, Reportage was named as one of the 'New lists to watch' by The Bookseller. All the titles published have received media coverage, something Eager and Whitehouse put down to "the newsworthy content, and their ability to get books out quickly."

Reportage Press books also have a charitable aspect: a percentage of the profits go towards a charity related to the book. For example, a percentage of profits from Denise Affonço's To The End Of Hell go to the Documentation Centre of Cambodia (DC-Cam), where a scholarship has been set up in the name of Denise Affonço's nine-year-old daughter Jeannie, who starved to death in 1976 under the Khmer Rouge regime.

== Authors ==
- Denise Affonço
- Tom Blass
- Rob Crilly
- Magdalene de Lancey
- Charlotte Eagar
- Sergei Golitsyn
- Tim Judah
- Justin Kerr-Smiley
- John Langdon-Davies
- Adam LeBor
- Joris Luyendijk
- David Charles Manners
- Daniela Norris
- Christopher Othen
- Oliver Poole
- Révérien Rurangwa
- William Stirling
- Reginald Thompson
- Annabel Venning
- Vitali Vitaliev
- Rosie Whitehouse
- Ros Wynne-Jones
