= Pulse 2: Afterlife =

- DVD cover
- Directed by: Joel Soisson
- Written by: Joel Soisson
- Produced by: Michael Leahy
- Starring: Jamie Bamber; Georgina Rylance; Karley Scott Collins; Boti Bliss; Todd Giebenhain; Lee Garlington
- Cinematography: Brandon Trost
- Edited by: Kirk Morri
- Music by: Elia Cmiral
- Production companies: Distant Horizon; Neo Art & Logic
- Distributed by: Dimension Films (Note: Released under the Dimension Extreme label.)
- Release dates: September 22, 2008 (Fantastic Fest); September 30, 2008 (United States)
- Running time: 89 minutes
- Countries: South Africa; United States
- Language: English

Pulse 2: Afterlife (also known on-screen as Pulse 2) is a 2008 techno-horror film. It is a standalone sequel to the 2006 film Pulse. The film is written and directed by Joel Soisson. It was followed by Pulse 3 (2008).

== Plot ==
During a pandemic of mass suicides and mysterious deaths caused by ghosts who spread through technology, Michelle searches for her daughter, Justine. Michelle’s ex-husband Stephen traces her path, discovering evidence that she planned to kill her daughter and herself. While at home, Michelle sees Justine on the road returning to her apartment. Michelle rushes downstairs, but Stephen grabs his daughter and leaves in his truck. Michelle transforms into a ghost and angrily stares at them as they drive away.

Stephen takes Justine up to his cabin and asks about what happened. She explains that her mother has died, dissolving into ash while attempting to kill her. Stephen's girlfriend Marta arrives that night. She sits down and gives a litany of complaints, one of them being that she refuses to lock herself up inside a red taped room. Stephen starts going through the food and Marta gets worried that he might not keep her around. Marta, trying to get Stephen to think she's useful to have around, tries to seduce him. She pulls him to a table, but the moment she sits on it, a laptop sitting on the table turns on. She complains because they're not supposed to have that type of technology, but Stephen says it's not even plugged in. Marta goes to hit the laptop with a golf club, but Stephen stops her. Suddenly they see continuous instant messages to Stephen from Michelle. When even more messages begin to come in, Marta shoves the laptop off the table and into a wall.

Stephen goes to speak with his daughter and she assures him that her mother is dead. While everyone is asleep, Stephen hears a beep indicating a new message and picks up the laptop. Despite the damage it is still working, so he sends an instant message to Michelle, causing her to appear at the cabin. Michelle kills Marta, but Stephen and Justine escape.

They are stopped by a man dressed in red, who commands Stephen at gunpoint to take him to a computer supply store and find a processor for him. With the processor, the man plans to find a solution for the world. Once Stephen completes this, the man gives him red tape and Stephen and Justine keep driving. They stop in the middle of a road, where Stephen covers the car in red tape. He and Justine fall asleep, but Stephen wakes up in the middle of the night to find the passenger-side door open and Justine missing. He manages to get Justine back before she touches her mother's ghost and they race back to the car.

The next day, Stephen peeks through the tape and sees a bus that is going to a refugee camp where wireless computer signals cannot reach. He and Justine get out, and he tells her to run straight to the bus. As they are about to reach it, Michelle appears. Stephen convinces his daughter that she should get on the bus and sacrifices himself to Michelle, saying that if she did not want to be lonely, she should take him and not their daughter. She kisses him then backs off and disappears with a smile. Stephen is relieved and thanks her, but Marta's ghost clings to him and takes his soul. Marta then backs off and Michelle is shown standing there, smiling.

Justine is safely in the bus with other refugees and escapees unscathed.

== Cast ==
- Jamie Bamber as Stephen
- Georgina Rylance as Michelle
- Karley Scott Collins as Justine
- Boti Bliss as Marta
- Todd Giebenhain as Man in Red
- Lee Garlington as Aunt Carmen
- Grant James as Uncle Pete
- William Prael as Cliff (Man on Bus)
- Laura Cayouette as Amy (Woman on Bus)
- Diane Ayala Goldner as Mrs. Sorenstram

== Release ==
The Weinstein Company released Pulse 2: Afterlife in the United States on September 30, 2008.

== Reception ==
Bloody Disgusting rated it 1/5 stars and called it one of the worst sequels made, as it has strayed far from the original Japanese film, has distractingly bad special effects, and poor directing. Steve Barton of Dread Central rated it 1.5/5 stars and wrote: "If you thought it couldn't get any worse, guess again". Michael Zupan rated it 1.5/5 stars and wrote: "Poor pacing, 'Colorforms' green screen effects, and some bad acting from the supporting cast, all play a hand in making this film fall apart".
