= Pulse (2006 film) =

2006 film by Jim Sonzero

- Theatrical release poster
- Directed by: Jim Sonzero
- Screenplay by: Wes Craven; Ray Wright
- Based on: Pulse by Kiyoshi Kurosawa
- Produced by: Anant Singh; Brian Cox; Michael Leahy; Joel Soisson
- Starring: Kristen Bell; Ian Somerhalder; Rick Gonzalez; Samm Levine; Kel O'Neill; Ron Rifkin; Christina Milian
- Cinematography: Mark Plummer
- Edited by: Bob Mori; Robert K. Lambert; Kirk M. Morri
- Music by: Elia Cmiral
- Production companies: Dimension Films; Distant Horizon; Neo Art & Logic
- Distributed by: Dimension Films
- Release date: August 11, 2006
- Running time: 86 minutes
- Country: United States
- Language: English
- Budget: $20.5 million
- Box office: $30 million

Pulse is a 2006 American techno-horror film directed by Jim Sonzero, written by Sonzero and Wes Craven, and starring Kristen Bell, Ian Somerhalder and Christina Milian. It is an English-language adaptation of the 2001 Japanese film.

The film was released on August 11, 2006 by Dimension Films. Despite being a moderate success, grossing $30 million on a $20.5 million budget, it was poorly reviewed by critics, who deemed it inferior to the original. The film spawned two sequels, Pulse 2: Afterlife and Pulse 3, both released in 2008.

== Plot ==
When Josh Ockmann enters a dark university library hoping to find a man named Douglas Ziegler, he is attacked by a humanoid spirit that sucks the life force out of him. Some days later, Josh's girlfriend, Mattie Webber, visits his apartment, seeing evidence that it has not been well kept. Josh tells Mattie to wait in the kitchen while he walks off. While waiting, she finds Josh's pet cat locked in a closet and dying from severe malnutrition. But when she rushes to tell him, she finds that he has committed suicide by hanging himself with an Internet cable.

Mattie and her friends begin to receive online messages from Josh asking for help but assume that Josh's computer is still on and that a virus is creating the messages. Mattie learns that Josh's computer has been sold to Dex McCarthy, who finds several strange videos on the computer. Mattie receives a package that Josh mailed two days before his death. Inside are rolls of red tape and a message telling her that the tape keeps "them" out, although he does not know why. Later, Dex visits Mattie and shows her video messages that Josh was sending to Ziegler. Josh had hacked Ziegler's computer system and then distributed a virus. This virus had unlocked a portal that connected the realm of the living to the realm of the dead. Josh believed he had coded a counter to the virus and wanted to meet Ziegler at the library. Josh's counter-program is found on a memory stick taped inside the PC case with red tape.

Dex and Mattie visit Ziegler and find his room plastered in red tape. They believe that the red tape keeps the spirits out. Ziegler tells them of a project he worked on where he found "frequencies no one knew existed". Opening these frequencies somehow allowed the spirits to travel to the world of the living. Ziegler also tells them that these spirits "take away your will to live" and where to find the main server infected with the virus.

Dex and Mattie find the server and upload Josh's fix, causing the system to crash and the spirits to vanish. Moments later, the system reboots and the spirits return, leaving Mattie and Dex with no option but to flee the city by car. Over the car radio, Mattie and Dex hear a report from the Army announcing the location of several "safe zones" with no Internet connections, cell phones or televisions. As Dex and Mattie are driving to a safe zone, a voice-over from Mattie is heard saying, "We can never go back. The cities are theirs. Our lives are different now. What was meant to connect us instead connected us to forces that we could have never imagined. The world we knew is gone but the will to live never dies. Not for us and not for them". The film closes by showing various clips of abandoned cities, which include a window of an apartment with Josh looking through it.

== Cast ==
- Kristen Bell as Mattie Webber
- Ian Somerhalder as Dexter
- Christina Milian as Isabelle Fuentes
- Rick Gonzalez as Stone
- Jonathan Tucker as Josh Ockmann
- Samm Levine as Tim
- Octavia Spencer as Landlady
- Ron Rifkin as Dr. Waterson
- Joseph Gatt as Dark Figure
- Kel O'Neill as Douglas Ziegler
- Zach Grenier as Professor Cardiff
- Riki Lindhome as Janelle
- Robert Clotworthy as Calvin
- Brad Dourif as Thin Bookish Guy
- Christine Barger as Goth Girl

== Production ==
=== Development ===
Following the premiere of Pulse at the Un Certain Regard, Dimension Films acquired the rights to the Japanese film, as well as the rights to a remake. Wes Craven was attached to Pulse shortly thereafter. Kiyoshi Kurosawa, director of the original film, was initially expected to helm the remake before Craven became officially involved. By June 2002, Craven had written the script with Vince Gilligan, with Kirsten Dunst eyed for the lead role. Craven worked on the film up until 2003 when Harvey Weinstein and Bob Weinstein asked Craven to direct Cursed instead; Craven declined due to lack of interest. With ten days out from filming the studio pulled the plug on the film as a means to draw Craven onto Cursed. In April 2004, the project was revived. Jim Sonzero took over as director and worked with Hellraiser: Deader scribe Tim Day for rewrites. Day would later be replaced by Ray Wright.

=== Pre-production ===
In March 2005, reports indicated that Craven was still involved with the project. Yet when talking to Fangoria at the time of the film's release, Craven said he was not involved in the making of the film. At the end of the month, Kristen Bell and Steve Talley joined the cast. Ian Somerhalder and Christina Milian rounded out the cast in April and June. Final additions to the cast included Jonathan Tucker, Corryn Cummins, Rick Gonzalez, Riki Lindhome, Samm Levine, Amanda Tepe and Joseph Gatt.

=== Filming ===
Principal production for Pulse lasted between June and September 2005 in Bucharest, Romania.

== Release ==
Pulse was released on August 11, 2006, by Dimension Films. The film was initially set for release on March 3, 2006.

== Reception ==
=== Box office ===
The film grossed over $8 million in its opening weekend in the United States. By its close on October 12, 2006, the film had grossed just over $20 million in the U.S., along with a foreign-box-office total, of just over $7.5 million, for a worldwide take of almost $28 million, compared with a production budget of approximately $20.5 million. As a DVD rental, the film has grossed a further $25 million.

=== Critical response ===
Upon release, Pulse was poorly received by critics. On the review aggregator website Rotten Tomatoes, 11% of 72 critics' reviews are positive, with an average rating of 3.8/10. The website's consensus reads: "Another stale American remake of a successful Japanese horror film, Pulse bypasses the emotional substance of the original and overcompensates with pumped-up visuals and every known horror cliche." On Metacritic, the film holds a 29 out of 100, indicating "generally unfavorable reviews".

Jamie Russell of the BBC gave the film 2/5 stars, writing that director Sonzero "reboots the original's apocalyptic dread to produce a remake that ain't an upgrade." Frank Scheck of The Hollywood Reporter said the film "isn't nearly as scary as watching your hard drive crash or having your BlackBerry conk out in the middle of a vital call." Variety's Robert Koehler wrote: "Unlike Kurosawa's storytelling choices, which stressed a distended grasp of time and an atmospheric sense of dread that couldn't quite be pinned down, the new Pulse takes everything literally and is most concerned with turning Mattie into a blonde hottie in distress."

Nick Schager of Slant was more positive in his review, calling it "a reasonably sinister scary movie that faithfully taps into its predecessor’s irrational, existential dread and distrust of technology." He gave it 2.5/4 stars.

In 2011, The Hollywood Reporter included Pulse in a list titled: "Halloween Gone Wrong: The 10 Least Scary Movies of All Time".

== Sequels ==
The film was followed by two sequels: Pulse 2: Afterlife, and Pulse 3. Both were released in 2008 and were written and directed by Joel Soisson.

== See also ==
- List of ghost films
