= Under the Sun =

Under the Sun is found in the Bible, Ecclesiastes 1:9, "The thing that hath been, it is that which shall be; and that which is done is that which shall be done: and there is no new thing under the sun." It may also refer to:

== Film and television ==
- Under the Sun (1998 film) (Under solen), a Swedish film directed by Colin Nutley
- Under the Sun (2015 film), a Russian documentary directed by Vitaly Mansky
- Under the Sun, a 1992 British film directed by Michael Winterbottom
- Under the Sun (1989 TV series), a BBC documentary TV series that ran for 11 seasons from 1989 to 2000
- Under the Sun (TV series) (Sous le soleil), a 1996–2008 French soap opera

== Literature ==
- Under the Sun, a 2007 novel by Justin Kerr-Smiley
- Under the Sun, a 2017 novel by Lottie Moggach

== Music ==
=== Albums ===
- Under the Sun (Ida Corr album) or the title song, 2009
- Under the Sun (Maya Shenfeld album), 2024
- Under the Sun (Paul Kelly album) or the title song, 1987
- Under the Sun (Yosui Inoue album) or the title song, 1993
- Under the Sun (Mark Pritchard album), 2016
- Under the Sun, by Cathy Leung, 2007
- Under the Sun, by Gordon Gano & The Ryans, 2009
- Under the Sun, by Sun-El Musician, 2026

=== Songs ===
- "Under the Sun" (Cheryl song), 2012
- "Under the Sun" (Do As Infinity song), 2002
- "Under the Sun" (Dreamville, J. Cole and Lute song), 2019
- "Under the Sun" (L.A.B. song), 2021
- "Under the Sun", by Big Kenny from Live a Little, 2005
- "Under the Sun", by Black Sabbath from Black Sabbath Vol. 4, 1972
- "Under the Sun", by the Buzzcocks from Modern, 1999
- "Under the Sun", by the Dreams from Revolt, 2010
- "Under the Sun", by Korpiklaani from Tales Along This Road, 2006
- "Under the Sun", by Marillion from Radiation, 1998
- "Under the Sun", by Michael Weatherly from the NCIS soundtrack, Volume 4, 2013
- "Under the Sun", by Ruston Kelly from Shape & Destroy, 2020
- "Under the Sun", by Thirteen Senses from Contact, 2007
