= Dirty South =

Dirty South or The Dirty South may refer to:

== Music ==
- Southern hip-hop, style of hip-hop sometimes known as "Dirty South" music
- "Dirty South" (song), 1996 single by Goodie Mob
- Dirty South (album), 2000 album by Rasheeda
- The Dirty South (album), 2004 album by Drive-By Truckers
- Dirty South (musician) (born 1978), Serbian-Australian electro house DJ and producer

== Other uses ==
- Southern United States, a geographic and cultural region of the United States
- Party Down South, also called Dirty South, American reality television series (2014–2016)
- The Dirty South (film), 2023 American crime thriller
