= Scooterman =

Scooterman is a short British romantic film comedy of 2010 produced and directed by Kirsten Cavendish, starring Ed Stoppard and Georgina Rylance.

== Outline ==
The film is set in Notting Hill and Pimlico. Gerald Jones (Ed Stoppard) is a struggling writer working on a difficult novel and meanwhile making a living as a “Scooterman”: he goes out on a scooter to drive people home in their own cars when they are drunk. Shortly before Christmas, Gerald meets and falls for Daisy (Georgina Rylance), one of his customers, but she is living with a controlling boyfriend who is a literary agent.

== Production ==
The film was the first made by Charlotte Eagar and was well received at the Cannes Film Festival. It went on to win the audience-rated Best of the Fest award at Palm Springs and Los Angeles Comedy Festival (2010), and it opened the Santa Barbara Film Festival in 2011.

== Cast ==
- Ed Stoppard as Gerald Jones
- Georgina Rylance as Daisy
- Annabel Mullion as Serena
- Daniel Pirrie as Barry
- Victoria Aitken as Girl who licks Gerald
- Georgina Birrell as dinner guest
- William Cash, Jr. as dinner guest
- Charlotte Eagar as grumpy academic
- Duncan Tinkler as Father Christmas
- Octavia McKenzie as amorous elf
