= Pulse 3 =

- DVD cover
- Directed by: Joel Soisson
- Written by: Joel Soisson
- Produced by: Michael Leahy
- Starring: Rider Strong; Brittany Finamore; Georgina Rylance; Todd Giebenhain; Thomas Merdis
- Cinematography: Brandon Trost
- Edited by: Kirk Morri
- Music by: Elia Cmiral
- Distributed by: Dimension Films (Note: Released under the Dimension Extreme label.)
- Release date: December 23, 2008
- Running time: 91 minutes
- Countries: South Africa; United States
- Language: English

Pulse 3 (also known as Pulse 3: Invasion) is a 2008 techno-horror film written and directed by Joel Soisson. Rider Strong and Brittany Finamore star as two people who begin chatting online in a post-apocalyptic society where technology is forbidden. It is a sequel to Pulse 2: Afterlife (2008). It is an international co-production between South Africa and the United States.

== Plot ==
Seven years into the invasion, and after Adam's Egyptian girlfriend Salwa got hit by an infection, causing her to commit suicide, humankind has fled the cities, where billions have died from a plague that is spread through the Internet.

Justine (from Pulse 2: Afterlife) dreams of a life beyond her squalid refugee camp, where all technology is taboo. She discovers a working laptop and opens it like Pandora's box. Someone is waiting for her online, and that someone wants to meet her, who is revealed to be Adam through an Internet chat. The only catch: she must return to "the city" - Houston. Justine embarks on a journey back to "the city".

On the journey she meets an older farmer who imprisons her and brings back his wife's ghost who infects him but lets Justine continue on her journey. The ghost allows Justine to leave.

In Houston she meets the same man who stole her father's car in Pulse 2: Afterlife (credited as "Man with a Plan"), who is now experimenting on the ghosts, and has found out they feel pain from infrared light. The "Man with a Plan" imprisons Justine in a room with a ghost who does not attack her. The man reveals himself to be extremely paranoid and manic. Justine peels a small hole into the protective cover of the window to the room, which releases the ghost. The man is infected by the ghost, after which he commit suicide. The ghost allows Justine to leave as well.

Justine leaves the man’s apartment and finally meets Adam, who reveals himself to be a ghost. With Justine’s help and the power of her recharged laptop, Adam is restored to human form. Justine realizes that she can potentially restore other ghosts as well. However, Adam’s return also reveals a dangerous side of the process: he displays sociopathic tendencies and seems to care about nothing but himself. Fearing the consequences, Justine smashes the functioning laptop and removes the USB stick from it. After parting ways with Adam, Justine encounters other ghosts, who continue to ignore her.

On her journey back to the refugee camp she is followed by "the man" in ghost form, trying to infect her. As he's about to succeed, unexpected explosions appear across Earth, making the ghosts disappear, and taking Adam as well.

The movie ends with a voice-over from Justine explaining that civilization returned.

== Cast ==
- Brittany Finamore as Justine
  - Karley Scott Collins as Young Justine
- Rider Strong as Adam
- Georgina Rylance as Michelle
- Todd Giebenhain as "Man with a Plan" (as "Man in Red" in Pulse 2: Afterlife)
- Thomas Merdis as Caleb Wilkie
- William Prael as Cliff
- Laura Cayouette as Amy
- Diane Ayala Goldner as Sarah Wilkie
- Noureen DeWulf as Salwa Gamal

== Production ==
This film and Pulse 2: Afterlife were shot back-to-back in Shreveport, Louisiana.

== Release ==
Pulse 3 was released on DVD in the United States on December 23, 2008.

== Reception ==
Bill Gibron of PopMatters rated it 3/10 stars and wrote that the series has now become a "holding dock for dull horror clichés". In comparing it to the original Japanese film, Gibron called it "too little, too late" for becoming a small, personal character study instead of exploring deeper themes. At DVD Talk, Justin Felix rated it 1.5/5 stars and wrote that the focus on teenage angst makes it only interesting to die-hard fans.
