= Denise Affonço =

Cambodian civil servant

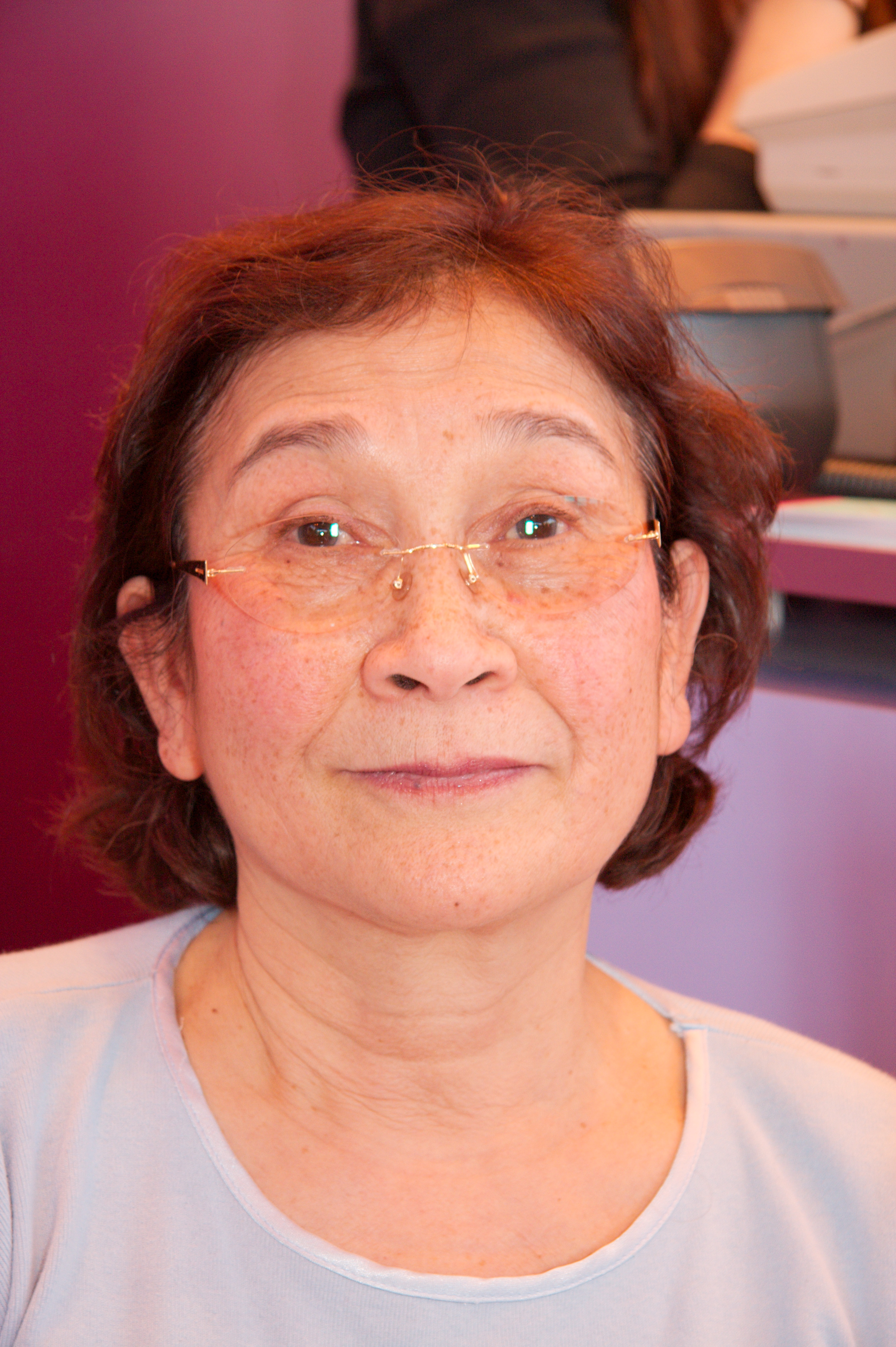
- Denise Affonço at a book fair in Paris, France, in March 2009.
- Born: Phnom Penh, Cambodia
- Occupation: Author
- Writing career
- Language: French
- Subject: Khmer Rouge
- Notable work: To The End Of Hell

Denise Affonço, born in Phnom Penh, Cambodia, is an author who wrote about her experience under the Khmer Rouge in To The End Of Hell, with an introduction by Jon Swain. She was born to a Vietnamese mother and French father and grew up before the Cambodian Civil War. After the Khmer Rouge took power, her husband was disappeared and her daughter died of starvation.

Originally written in French, the work has recently been published into English by Reportage Press and received a positive review from The Economist, which said "That the Extraordinary Chambers in the Courts of Cambodia, as the tribunal is known, is at last functional makes the publication in English of Denise Affonço's harrowing memoir a timely reminder of why its work still matters."

== Interviews ==
- Interview on France 24
- 'Living Through the Terror' The Economist
- Interview on the BBC
- 'A mother never forgets by Jon Swain' The Sunday Times
