= Laura Cayouette =

American actress

- Born: Washington, D.C., U.S.
- Education: University of South Alabama
- Occupation: Actress
- Years active: 1995–present
- Spouse: Andy Gallagher (m. 2014)

Laura Cayouette is an American actress.

== Early life ==
Cayouette was born in Washington, D.C., and grew up in Maryland. Laura graduated from the University of Maryland, College Park with a BA in English, then graduated a year later from University of South Alabama with an M.A. in Creative Writing and English Literature. In 2014, Cayouette was made their Distinguished Alumni Award Recipient and her name was added to the university's clock tower. Before pursuing a career in acting, Cayouette worked as a nightclub DJ, model, English professor, dress shop manager and a ticket taker at Universal City Walk Hollywood. She studied at the American Academy of Dramatic Arts in New York before moving to Los Angeles in 1992. There, she studied with Milton Katselas at the Beverly Hills Playhouse, then with Ivana Chubbuck at her studio.

== Career ==
Best known as Lara Lee Candie-Fitzwilly, the sister of the main villain in Quentin Tarantino's Django Unchained, Cayouette's acting career started in 1996 with a role in The Evening Star (1996), the sequel to Terms of Endearment, opposite Shirley MacLaine and Juliette Lewis. The same year she worked with David Duchovny and Garry Shandling on an award-winning episode of The Larry Sanders Show and followed that with the Friends episode "The One with the Screamer".

Cayouette has worked with Tarantino four times. He first directed her in Kill Bill, Vol. 2 (2004), then produced as she acted in Daltry Calhoun, a 2005 film directed by Charles Bronson’s daughter, Katrina Holden Bronson. In 2008, Cayouette and Tarantino produced Hell Ride, a biker movie featuring Cayouette, Dennis Hopper, Michael Madsen and David Carradine, and followed that up with Django Unchained (2012).

Cayouette directed Joanna Cassidy and Danica McKellar in the 2004 short film, Intermission then directed Richard Dreyfuss and Mircea Monroe in the 2011 short film, Lone Star Trixie. Cayouette is the first person to ever wear a Project Runway dress to the Oscars. Designer Austin Scarlett accompanied her to the event.

Cayouette has written seven books, including Know Small Parts: An Actor's Guide to Turning Minutes into Moments and Moments into a Career with foreword by Richard Dreyfuss and endorsements from Kevin Costner, Reginald Hudlin, and Lou Diamond Phillips. She is also the author of a coming of age novel, Lemonade Farm, and the amateur-sleuth Charlotte Reade Mysteries series set in New Orleans and highlighting cultural events like Jazz Fest, Southern Decadence, and the Mardi Gras Indians’ Super Sunday, as well as moments like the Saints Super Bowl victory during Carnival, the BP oil spill, and Hurricane Isaac.

Cayouette writes a blog, LAtoNOLA.com, recounting many of those same events as well as dancing with the New Orleans Pussyfooters in the Mardi Gras parades and riding with Quentin Tarantino in the Monarch float after she arranged for him to preside over the Krewe of Orpheus parade during Mardi Gras 2014.

She was elected as a Convention Delegate in the 2019 SAG-AFTRA New Orleans Local election. More recent acting roles include the recurring Marlene in Ava Duverney's Queen Sugar and John Schneider's wife in the film Hate Crime (2017).

== Personal life ==
On May 24, 2014, Cayouette married Andy Gallagher in New Orleans.

== Filmography ==
=== Film ===
Year	Film	Role	Notes
1996	The Evening Star	Becky	
1997	Lovelife	Woman in the Window	
1998	Krippendorf's Tribe	TV Studio Woman	
1998	Enemy of the State	Christa Hawkins	
1999	For Love of the Game	Masseuse	
2000	Meeting Daddy	Happy Ending Girl	Uncredited
2000	Baby Luv	Megan	
2001	Anacardium AKA Deranged	Ashley	
2004	Kill Bill: Volume 2	Rocket	
2004	Kill Bill: The Whole Bloody Affair	Rocket	
2004	Intermission (Short)	Toilet Paper Lady	Writer, director
2005	Daltry Calhoun	Wanda Banks	
2007	Flight of the Living Dead: Outbreak on a Plane	Dr. Kelly	
2008	Hell Ride	Dani	Also associate producer
2008	The Appearance of Things	Elizabeth	
2008	Pulse 2: Afterlife	Amy	Direct-to-video
2008	Pulse 3	Amy	Direct-to-video
2011	Never Back Down 2: The Beatdown	Vail	Direct-to-video
2011	Green Lantern	Party Guest No. 1	
2011	Brawler		
2011	Lone Star Trixie (Short)	Trixie	Writer, director
2012	Abraham Lincoln: Vampire Hunter	Vadoma Maid	Uncredited
2012	Django Unchained	Lara Lee Candie-Fitzwilly	
2013	Now You See Me	Hypnotized Woman	
2014	The Loft	Mrs. Kotkin	
2014	American Heist	Lone Officer	
2014	Dark Places	Krissi Cates' Mother	
2015	Maggie	Linda	Uncredited
	Shark Island (TV Movie)	Dr. Palmer	
	Sex School	Wanda Cox	
2016	Convergence	Ester	
2016	Like Son	Susie Rugger	
2016	Inadmissible	Librarian	
2016	Summertime	Paul's Mom	
2016	Ozark Sharks	Diane	
2016	Cold Moon	Ginny Darrish	
2017	Bad Stepmother (TV Movie)	Jeanette	
2017	Camera Store	Brenda Klammadge	
2017	Hate Crime	Marie Demarco	
2018	Cut Off	Bridget	
2018	The Domestics	Connie	
2023	The Dirty South		

=== Television ===
Year	Title	Role	Notes
1996	The Larry Sanders Show	Carol	Episode: "Everybody Loves Larry"
1996	Flipper	Beth McKenzie	Episode: "Best of the Beach"
1997, 2004	Friends	Cailin	Episode: "The One with The Screamer" "The One with All the Other Ones: Part 2" (archive footage)
1999	Fantasy Island		Episode: "The Real Thing"
1999	Diagnosis: Murder	Evette	Episode: "Murder on the Hour"
1999	Nash Bridges	Stephanie Green	Episode: "Vendetta"
1999	Martial Law	Kay Morgan	Episode: "Call of the Wild"
2000	The Pretender	Jenna McGann	Episode: "Lifeline"
2000	JAG	Lieutenant Irene Charlton	Episode: "Body Talk"
2012–2013	Treme	Kay	Episode: "Knock with Me - Rock with Me" "Episode #4.4"
2014	True Detective	Theresa Weems	Episode: "Who Goes There"
2017	House of Cards	Woman	Episode: Chapter 57
2017–2018	Queen Sugar	Marlene	Episode: "After the Winter"; Episode: "Caroling Dusk"; Episode: "Freedom's Plow"; Episode: "Dream Variations"; Episode: "Your Passages Have Been Paid"
