= Maya Shenfeld =

Israeli composer and musician

Maya Shenfeld מיה שנפלד
- Born: Maya Shenfeld
- Origin: Jerusalem
- Genres: Electronic; experimental
- Occupations: Composer; musician
- Labels: Thrill Jockey; Warp
- Website: mayashenfeld.com

Maya Shenfeld (Hebrew: מיה שנפלד) is a Jerusalem-born composer and musician based in Berlin, Germany. She has released two albums: In Free Fall (2022) and Under the Sun (2024).

== Early life and education ==
Shenfeld was born in Jerusalem and began her musical training there. When she was 20 years old, she had completed her first degree in classical guitar in the Jerusalem Academy of Music and Dance. After moving to Berlin, she studied contemporary music performance and composition at the Berlin University of the Arts (UDK).

== Music ==
Shenfeld's work explores electronic, popular and experimental music and their intersection. Writing for The Guardian, music journalist John Lewis described her work as "invoking the transcendent", writing that it is "music that uses 21st-century technology to conjure up images of liturgical chants and ancient temples".

Her album In Free Fall (Thrill Jockey, 2022) was number one on Stereogum's "10 Best Experimental Albums Of 2022".

In 2022 Shenfeld scored two short films, Piazza Futura by Kevin b. Lee and the documentary The Flagmakers by Cynthia Wade and Sharon Liese.

== Discography ==
=== Studio albums ===
List of studio albums, with selected details
Title	Details
In Free Fall	Released: 28 January 2022; Label: Thrill Jockey; Format: Digital
Under the Sun	Released: 23 February 2024; Label: Thrill Jockey; Format: Digital
