= Charlotte Eagar =

British journalist, filmmaker and novelist (born 1965)

Charlotte Eagar (born 1965) is a British journalist, filmmaker, and novelist. She is known for her work The Girl in the Film, New Hall: The History of England in One House and The Trojan Women Project which includes productions of Queens of Syria and Oliver!. She is also a war correspondent and foreign affairs journalist for many publications including Newsweek, The Spectator, The Times, and previously the Sunday Telegraph.

== Early Life ==
Eagar read Classics at Oxford University and has a postgraduate diploma in Islamic and Middle Eastern Studies from Edinburgh University. Her early life was spent in London and Shropshire, where her father the Irish/English cricketer and hockey player, Michael Eagar, was a housemaster.

== Career ==
In 1986, Eager was an apprentice dress-designer for the couturier Victor Edelstein in 1986, where she helped make dresses for, among others, the late Princess of Wales. She started working at the Evening Standard and Daily Mail while still at university. Her first foreign story was covering the 1989 Romanian Revolution for The Scotsman as a freelancer. After spending some months covering the collapse of the former USSR in 1992, based in Kyiv and Moscow, and travelling and reporting widely throughout the Caucasus and Central Asia, as a freelancer, Eagar moved to Bosnia, where she became The Observer's Balkans Correspondent, based in Sarajevo during the siege. She covered the war in Bosnia until its end in 1996. Her 2008 novel, The Girl in The Film, is inspired by her experiences during the war.

In the mid-1990s, Eagar moved back to London. After working as acting Deputy Features Editor of The Scotsman, with a column on Scotland on Sunday, she became Assistant Features Editor of the Mail on Sunday, and, in 1999, Deputy Features Editor of the Sunday Telegraph. After living in Rome for two years to work on her novel The Girl in the Film, she returned to be Contributing Editor on the Evening Standard magazine, specializing in investigative features, in the UK and abroad, and later Senior Editor of Tatler.

Eagar also continued to write for many other publications – including Prospect, The Spectator, and the Sunday Times Magazine, continuing her interest in foreign affairs, writing from Iraq for the Times Magazine in 2004 about the boom in governments sub-contracting security in war zones to private security firms and the looting of artworks from Baghdad's Iraq Museum and for the Mail on Sunday, from places such as Afghanistsan (2006 – investigating alleged fraud by the British government on Afghan poppy farmers in Helmand); to South Korea (2008), investigating refugees being smuggled from North Korea to South Korea and covering the Somali pirate crisis in 2011–12.

In 2012, she joined Newsweek as a Contributing Editor and was sent on assignment to various countries, including Italy and Bosnia, where she covered Srebrenica's DNA identification programme, among other stories. Her 2016 piece for Granta, "The Colonel's New Life", followed a Syrian family making the journey by boat and land from Turkey to Germany.

Eagar was the Conservative Party candidate in Liverpool Wavertree in the 2024 United Kingdom general election. Receiving 1,887 votes (4.7%) of the vote, and losing her deposit.

== Films ==
In 2009–10 Eagar and her husband, William Stirling, co-wrote and co-produced their first film, Scooterman, a short rom com starring Ed Stoppard and Georgina Rylance, directed and co-produced by Kirsten Cavendish (to watch Scooterman click on a link cited here). Scooterman was in Cannes Short Film Corner (2010) and won Audience-rated Best of the Fest at the LA Comedy Festival and Palm Springs.

Eagar has also exec-produced and produced several documentaries as part of her work at the Trojan Women Project, including Queens of Syria, The World to Hear, and The Trojans 2019 Edinburgh Festival, and Queens of Syria 2016 Young Vic/Developing Artists co-production theatrical performance films.

Since 2007, Eagar has occasionally devised and run communication campaigns, first for her own projects, such as The Girl in the Filmand Scooter man.

== Trojan Women Project ==
In 2013, inspired by training films Eagar and Stirling had written and directed for M&S's Kenyan partner Vegpro in Nairobi with a Kenyan cast of Vegpro workers, Eagar and Stirling set up the Trojan Women Project (TWP), a not-for-profit combined psycho-social support and strategic communications drama project for refugees. Initially called the Syria Trojan Women Project, it was set up at the request of Oxfam and was backed by the British charity Prospero World (UK-registered charity No 1163952.

Originally working with Syrian refugees in Jordan, the Trojan Women Project now operates mainly in the UK, with refugees and asylum seekers from many countries and is backed by the National Lottery Heritage Fund. The project has been designed to help refugees overcome their isolation, depression, and trauma, through regular drama workshops, while giving the participants, through plays and films, a platform to tell their stories to the world. It creates both a process and a product. The concept involves refugees working their own stories into the text of a play – most usually Euripides' great anti-war tragedy, The Trojan Women – through regular workshops, and then performing their play.

As part of the strategy of TWP, Eagar and Stirling commissioned and exec-produced a documentary, Queens of Syria (directed by Yasmin Fedda and produced by Itab Azzam and Georgina Paget), about the project, which has won many awards. (The film was produced by Refuge Productions Ltd, which Eagar and Stirling and others set up to support the Trojan Women Project.)

In line with the aim of TWP, their original 2013 Jordan-based production, Syria: The Trojan Women, directed by the Syrian director Omar Abusaada, with an all-female cast of Syrian refugees – and the accompanying documentary Queens of Syria – was widely covered by the international media. In 2014, the project and the Syrian cast also featured in a special Skype gala event at Georgetown University, hosted by Georgetown's Laboratory for Global Performance and Politics and at Columbia University, hosted by their Centre for Core Curriculum and their Global Mental Health program.

Since 2013, the Trojan Women Project has continued this pattern of drama workshops in Jordan, Europe, and the UK, with performances combined with accompanying films. The Trojan Women Project and their films are now shown and studied at many US and UK universities (including Oxford, UCLA, Edinburgh, Yale and Austin University, Texas) and have also featured in various academic articles.

TWP other projects include the Jordan-based first ever Arabic adaption of the musical Oliver! (2015) with a junior cast of Syrian refugees children, supported by Sir Cameron Mackintosh, and Welcome to Zaatari/We Are All Refugees (2015), an English/Arabic radio drama, set in Zaatari camp, with a Syrian refugee cast, that was broadcast on BBC Radio 4 and BBC Arabic. Their 2016 adaptation of The Trojan Women, also called Queens of Syria, directed by Zoe Lafferty and co-produced with the Young Vic and the theatrical charity Developing Artists, toured the UK. It was extremely well-received, with four and five-star reviews, focussing on the courage of the cast. Footage from Queens of Syria 2016 Young Vic/Developing Artists Theatrical Performance Film was included in the British Museum's 2019 Troy: Myth and Reality exhibition. The documentary of the tour, The World to Hear (2018), directed by Charlotte Ginsborg and Anatole Sloan and produced by Eagar and Stirling, was screened at the Glasgow Film Festival and the London International Documentary Festival in 2017/18. They also ran Kaleidoscope, radio drama writing workshops for Syrian refugees in Aberdeen, Glasgow, and Heidelberg in 2016–17, backed by the UNHCR.

In 2018–19, Eagar and Stirling ran drama workshops for Syrian refugees re-settled in Glasgow, backed by Glasgow City Council, which culminated in The Trojans, their third adaptation of Euripides' Trojan Women, directed by Victoria Beesley, with a mixed-gender Syrian cast. The Trojans premiered at the Platform Theatre in Glasgow in February 2019 and was given four-star reviews. The play then went to the Edinburgh Festival in August 2019 with the Pleasance EICC, playing to an audience of over 500 people, again, with four-star reviews.

In 2020, "The Trojans" were asked by the Scottish Government to be one of their key partners in the Edinburgh International Culture Summit. During Covid, TWP ran Enscripted, a programme of regular zoom black comedy-drama groups, working with Syrian participants from all over the Middle East, Europe, and the UK.

=== Academic reach ===
The films made as part of the reach of the Trojan Women Project are regularly screened with Q&A panels, at festivals and at US and UK universities, often studied as part of their syllabuses, on courses ranging from Drama and Diversity (UCLA) to Classics (Oxford, Cambridge, Edinburgh, Brown, Yale, Austin Texas, etc) and Psychology (Columbia). TWP's work has also been the subject of several academic articles eg.

== Books ==
In 2008, Eagar published The Girl in the Film, a novel set in Sarajevo during the war and post-war years. She contributed a chapter to Contemporary Representations of Forced Migration in Europe, edited by Fiona Barclay and Beatrice Ivey of Stirling University (2024).
