= Ben Judah =

Franco-British journalist

Benjamin William Judah (born 31 March 1988) is a British journalist and author of This Is London and Fragile Empire.

== Early and personal life ==
The son of journalist Tim Judah and Rosie Whitehouse, he was born in London. He is of Baghdadi Jewish descent. He spent a portion of his childhood in the Balkans before returning to London where he was educated at the Lycée Français Charles de Gaulle. He studied politics at Trinity College, Oxford during the 2000s. Judah is married to journalist Rosie Gray.

== Career ==
Judah began his career as a foreign correspondent. He covered the 2008 Russo-Georgian War, the 2010 Kyrgyz Revolution and the 2011 Tunisian Revolution and has reported from the Levant, Caucasus, Siberia, Central Asia and Xinjiang.

Judah has held fellowships on foreign affairs at a variety of think-tanks committed to Western alliances. From 2010 to 2012, Judah was a policy fellow in London at the European Council on Foreign Relations, a pro-European think tank. From 2017 to 2020, he held a research fellowship at the Atlanticist think tank the Hudson Institute in Washington, D.C., where he led research for the Kleptocracy Initiative. From 2020 to 2024, He was a senior fellow at the Atlantic Council, a think tank in Washington, D.C.,where he directed the Transform Europe Initiative.

Judah has written three books. His first, Fragile Empire (2013), a study of Vladimir Putin's Russia, was published by Yale University Press. His second, This Is London, was published by Picador in 2016. The book was longlisted for the 2016 Baillie Gifford Prize for Non-fiction and its Polish translation shortlisted for the 2019 Ryszard Kapuscinski Award for Literary Reportage and received positive reviews, though some experts criticised its sensationalism and questioned its authenticity. This Is London brought Judah to the attention of MP David Lammy. His third book This is Europe was published by Picador in 2023.

From February 2024 until early 2026, Judah worked as Special Advisor to David Lammy. According to the New Statesman, Judah shaped Lammy's doctrine of "progressive realism" and raised Lammy's profile domestically and internationally.

== Political positions ==
Judah has suggested the left ought to "embrace the results of the free market and technology" with regard to the effects of labour automation on professions, which he considered would bring about "a radical opening up of legal and financial expertise"; he proposed to call this political direction "socialism with an iPad".

During the internal Labour Party row over the revision of the previously adopted International Holocaust Remembrance Alliance's definition of antisemitism in the summer of 2018, Judah criticised "hardliners around [Jeremy] Corbyn, such as his director of strategy, Seumas Milne" for diluting the party's antisemitism code on the one hand, and the three leading Anglo-Jewish newspapers' denunciation of a potential Corbyn government as an "existential threat" to Jews in Britain on the other hand, regarding the latter as a symptom of post-Brexit radicalisation in British politics.

In a 2020 op-ed co-authored with Progressive International's general secretary David Adler, he favourably contrasted Bernie Sanders's foreign policy positions with Barack Obama's record on Russia, stating that Sanders's support for the Green New Deal and targeting of state corruption undermined the "pillars of Kremlin power".

=== Relations with George Galloway's circle ===
Judah claimed to have been punched in the face and insulted for his Jewish background by Respect Party activists at the party's meeting as a Politico reporter not long before Respect's dissolution in 2016.

George Galloway's new formation Workers Party of Britain later published the claim that Judah had been named as a Russia expert by Chris Donnelly in a 2016 Integrity Initiative document, leaked by Anonymous in 2018.

== Awards and recognition ==
In 2015, he was commended as the Feature Writer of the Year award at the British Press Awards.

Judah's name appeared on the Forbes 30 Under 30 Europe list in 2016.

In 2024, the New Statesman named Judah as one of the 50 most influential people shaping the UK's progressive politics.

== Bibliography ==
=== Books ===
- Fragile Empire. Yale University Press. 2013. ISBN 978-0300205220.
- This Is London. Picador. 2016. ISBN 9781447272441.
- This is Europe: The Way We Live Now. Picador. 2023. ISBN 9781447276265.
