= Annabel Mullion =

British actress

- Born: Annabel Mullion
- Occupation: Actress

Annabel Mullion is a British actress. She was educated at St Mary's School, Ascot and studied English and Drama at the University of East Anglia. She then completed the 3 year acting course at Central School of Speech and Drama, graduating in 1994. She won the Carleton Hobbs Bursary Award in that year as well.

Her films include Carrington (1995), Mission: Impossible (1996), A Christmas Carol (1999), Me Without You (2001), Scooterman (2010), and Mother's Milk (2012) for which she received Best Supporting Actress at the Monaco Film Festival 2013 for her role as Mary Melrose.

In 2006, she played Lady Tara Butler in Midsomer Murders, episode “Vixen’s Run”. She also appeared in Emma a TV mini-series in 2009 as Mrs. Woodhouse.

She has had many parts in television including Law & Order: UK, Doll & Em, Agatha Christie's Poirot, Breathless, Wallander, Midsomer Murders and Lewis.

In 2012, she appeared in the TV series Lewis, episode "The Soul of Genius" as Thea Falconer. In 2013, she appeared in Agatha Christie’s Poirot, episode "Elephants Can Remember" as Lady Ravenscroft, in Doll & Em, episode "Six" as Woman with Lurchers and in Breathless a TV mini-series as Duchess.

Her theatre parts include a nine-month run as Shelia in An Inspector Calls directed by Stephen Daldry, Lydia Languish in The Rivals directed by Braham Murray, and Lady Mary in The White Carnation directed by Knight Mantel. In 2019, she appeared in Bodies by James Saunders.

From 1996 to 2004, Annabel was the muse of Lucian Freud who created three paintings of her, including Annabel and Rattler 1997-1998. She also appeared in Malcolm Venville's book of advertising, celebrity, fashion, and personal photography, Layers.

== Filmography ==
=== Film ===
Year	Title	Role	Notes
1995	Carrington	Mary Hutchinson	
1996	Mission: Impossible	Flight Attendant	
2001	Me Without You	Meredith	
2003	Sitting Ducks	Fiona	
2004	Rabbit on the Moon	Bank Lady	
2010	Scooterman	Serena	Short film
2011	Mother's Milk	Mary Melrose	
2017	Final Portrait	Anne-Marie Frenaud	
2020	Cherry Bomb	Madre	Short film
2021	The Cursed	Older Charlotte Laurent	aka: Eight for Silver
2021	Warning	Dora	
2022	An Earl's Court Miscellany	(unknown)	
2025	Jay Kelly	Woman in the Window	
2026	Thrash	Claire Fields	
2026	Digger	Agatha	

=== Television ===
Year	Title	Role	Notes
1997	A Dance to the Music of Time	Mona	Mini-series; 3 episodes
1997	Mr. White Goes to Westminster	Labour Woman	Television film
1998	Jonathan Creek	Felicity Vale	2 episodes
1999	Kavanagh QC	Martha Miller	2 episodes
1999	A Christmas Carol	Emily Bowley	Television film
2000	Rhona	Sam	Episode: "The Birthday Girl"
2003	Cambridge Spies	1st Wife	Mini-series; episode 4
2006	Midsomer Murders	Lady Tara Butler	Episode: "Vixen's Run"
2007	Trial & Retribution	Mrs. Greenaway	2 episodes: "Curriculum Vitae: Parts 1 & 2"
2007	Diana: Last Days of a Princess	Rosa Monckton	Television film
2007	The Whistleblowers	Eve	Episode: "No Child Left Behind"
2008	Wallander	Marianne Falk	Episode: "Firewall"
2009	Emma	Mrs. Woodhouse	Mini-series; episode 1
2009	Doctors	Liz Weaver	Episode: "A Manny About the House"
2010	Holby City	Gillian Maynard	Episode: "Dandelions"
2011–2014	Law & Order: UK	Pathologist Eleanor	Recurring role; 4 episodes
2012	Lewis	Thea Falconer	Episode: "The Soul of Genius"
2012	Doctors	Sophie Hayward	Episode: "Upper Crust"
2013	Agatha Christie's Poirot	Lady Ravenscroft	Episode: "Elephants Can Remember"
2013	Doll & Em	Woman with Lurchers	Episode: "Six"
2013	Breathless	Duchess	Mini-series; episode 1
2013	Lucan	Annabel Birley	Mini-series
2014	Doctors	Margaret Plumber	Episode: "Judge and Jury"
2016	Victoria	Lady Beatrice Gifford	Episode: "Engine of Change"
2018	Patrick Melrose	Annabel	Mini-series; episode 5: "At Last"
2018	Women on the Verge	Dr. Conlon	2 episodes
2021	The Pursuit of Love	Aunt Emily	Mini-series; 2 episodes
2022	Gentleman Jack	Lady Stuart De Rothesay	Episode: "It's Not Illegal"
2022	The Crown	Fiona Shackleton	Episode: "Couple 31"
2024	A Good Girl's Guide to Murder	Rosie Hastings	2 episodes
2024–2025	The Agency	Emily Ogletree	3 episodes
2026	The Night Manager	Celia Mayhew	2 episodes

=== Video games ===
Year	Title	Voice Role	Notes
2022	Xenoblade Chronicles 3	Past Moebius R	English versions
2023	Xenoblade Chronicles 3: Future Redeemed	Past Moebius R	English versions
