= Wayne Péré =

American actor

- Born: March 23, 1965 (age 61); Houma, Louisiana, U.S.
- Education: Louisiana State University
- Occupation: Actor
- Years active: 1989–present

Wayne Péré (born March 23, 1965), sometimes credited as Wayne Pére or Wayne Pere, is an American character actor.

== Life and career ==
Péré was born in Houma, Louisiana, and is the youngest of three brothers. After graduating high school, Péré had an interest in becoming a commercial diver and moved to Houston to learn the craft. He eventually grew bored with the job and quit. He followed his brothers' footsteps and headed to Louisiana State University where he discovered acting "by accident" while looking at courses relating to speech. After graduating, he began to star in various projects such as Galaxy Quest where he met a then unknown Sam Rockwell. He also guest starred in Northern Exposure, Ghost Whisperer and Nip/Tuck He was part of the main cast of the short lived series Dead Last.

Péré continued to appear in other shows, such as Underground, and made other appearances in film, such as The Big Short, Trumbo and Free State of Jones. He joined the cast of Marvel's Cloak & Dagger as Peter Scarborough. He also appeared in Venom alongside Tom Hardy and Riz Ahmed and made appearances in the HBO series Tracey Takes On... and Watchmen, as well as the films Trial by Fire and Capone.

== Filmography ==
Film roles
Year	Title	Role	Notes
1990	An American Summer	Rockman	
1991	Beastmaster 2: Through the Portal of Time	Punker #2	
1993	Painted Desert	Cosmo	
1996	Eye for an Eye	Gene Forest, French Teacher	
1998	Out of Sight	Philip	
1998	Soundman	Igby Walters	
1999	The Limey	Pool Hall Creep	
1999	Galaxy Quest	Lathe	
2002	Full Frontal	Sex Shop Man #2	
2002	Graced	Nicholas	Short film
2003	Rapid Exchange	Daltry	Direct-to-Video
2004	In the Land of Milk and Money	Hank Cameraman	
2005	Gratuity	Jack Kendle	Short film
2006	Extreme Walking	Cleveland Tims	Also director
2007	Ocean's Thirteen	Fireworks Guy	
2007	Perfect Day	—N/a	Short film; Producer and editor
2008	Pillow Talk	—N/a	Short film; Producer and editor
2009	The Informant!	Sheldon Zenner	
2009	Pretty Twisted	Slash / Clarance	Short film
2009	Kink	—N/a	Short film; Director and writer
2010	Mirrors 2	Detective Piccirilli	Direct-to-Video
2010	Swishbucklers	—N/a	Producer, additional editor and unit production manager
2011	Seeking Justice	Cancer	
2011	Creature	Bud	
2012	Lay the Favorite	Scott	
2012	Bending the Rules	I.A. Sergeant	
2013	The Haunting in Connecticut 2: Ghosts of Georgia	Station Master - 1858	
2013	Empire State	Williams	
2013	12 Years a Slave	Winslow	Uncredited
2013	Nothing Left to Fear	Mason	
2013	King of Herrings	Leon	
2014	Kristy	Professor	
2014	99 Homes	Frank's Lawyer	
2014	The Masters of Suspense (Les Maîtres du suspense)	Dwayne	
2015	A Sort of Homecoming	Adam	
2015	Maggie	George Garmen	Uncredited
2015	Fantastic Four	Science Fair Judge	
2015	American Ultra	Deputy Krantz	
2015	I Saw the Light	Toby Marshall	
2015	Trumbo	Next Door Neighbor	
2015	The Big Short	Martin Blaine	
2016	Midnight Special	Prison FBI Agent	
2016	Miracles from Heaven	Ben	
2016	Smothered	Ranger Moochie	
2016	Free State of Jones	Colonel Robert Lowry	
2017	The Case for Christ	Wayne Marlow	
2017	The Beguiled	Captain	
2017	Spider-Man: Homecoming	History Teacher	
2017	Mark Felt: The Man Who Brought Down the White House	John Ehrlichman	
2017	Shock and Awe	Intelligence Source	
2017	Heart, Baby	Abraham	
2018	Billionaire Boys Club	Baxter	
2018	Trial by Fire	George Gilbert	
2018	Venom	Dr. Lloyd Emerson	
2019	The Perfect Date	Delbert Newhouse	
2019	Semper Fi	Tom Nichols	
2020	Walkaway Joe	Leo	
2020	Capone	Supervisor Nordhoff	
2023	Bottoms	Principal Meyers	
2023	The Dirty South		

Television roles
Year	Title	Role	Notes
1989	Alien Nation	Thor	Episode: "Fifteen with Wanda"
1989	Chicken Soup	Student	Episode: "Pilot"
1989	Chicken Soup	John Banks	Episode: "Double Date"
1990	Doctor Doctor	Waiter	Episode: "Doctors and Other Strangers"
1990	Normal Life	Deiter	Episode: "Transition"
1990	The Flash	Rick	Episode: "Pilot"
1990	WIOU	Dispatcher	Episode: "The Inquisition"
1990	The Trials of Rosie O'Neill	Tristan	Episode: "Mother Love"
1991	The New Adam-12	Rendquist	Episode: "Bad Blood"
1993	Moon Over Miami	Eduardo Cortez	Episode: "Quiero Vivir"
1994	Phenom	Photographer	Episode: "Angela's Fifteen Minutes"
1994	Winnetka Road		Episode: "The White Zone"
1994	Friends	Max	Episode: "The One with the Monkey"
1994-1995	Northern Exposure	Prof. Bob Pickering	2 episodes
1995	Lois & Clark: The New Adventures of Superman	Rolf	Episode: "Top Copy"
1995	ER	Eric Favre	Episode: "Sleepless in Chicago"
1995	The Watcher	Franco	Episode: "Passion Plays"
1995	Courthouse	Alec Robinson	Episode: "Mitigating Circumstances"
1995	Murder, She Wrote	Jimmy Neiman	Episode: "Nailed"
1995	Fallen Angels	Ziag	Episode: "The Professional Man"
1995-1997	Walker, Texas Ranger	Victor LaRue	3 episodes
1996	Dark Angel		TV movie
1996	Diagnosis: Murder	Ray Dinino	Episode: "Murder Can Be Contagious"
1996	The Burning Zone		Episode: "Lethal Injection"
1996	Alien Nation: The Enemy Within	Terry Firma	TV movie
1997	Orleans	Stevovich	Episode: "Why Did the Crawfish Cross the Road?"
1997	The Gregory Hines Show	Noel Mazzu	Episode: "Pilot"
1997	Pensacola: Wings of Gold		Episode: "Birds of Prey"
1997	Tracey Takes On...	Geraldo	Episode: "Sex"
1997	Total Security	Stanley Cahill	Episode: "Citizen Canine"
1997	Walker, Texas Ranger	Cuadroza	2 episodes
1997	Star Trek: Voyager	Guill	Episode: "Random Thoughts"
1998	Profiler	Jimmy Coniglio	Episode: "Every Five Minutes"
1998	3rd Rock from the Sun	Jonesy	Episode: "The Physics of Being Dick"
1998	That '70s Show	Randy	Episode: "That's 70's Pilot"
1998	V.I.P.	Arnie Feign	Episode: "What to Do with Vallery When You're Dead"
1998	Brimstone	Rabbi Samuel Weisburg	Episode: "Ashes"
1998	Spy Game	Bob	Episode: "Necessity Is the Mother of Infection"
1999	Oh Baby	Digger	Episode: "Dreams"
1999	Martial Law	Eddie	Episode: "Breakout"
1999	Tracey Takes On...	Maniac	Episode: "Road Rage"
1999	Pirates of Silicon Valley	Captain Crunch	TV movie
1999	Grown Ups	Jean	Episode: "Truth Be Told"
1999	Dawson's Creek	Boat Guy	Episode: "Escape from Witch Island"
1999-2001	Any Day Now	Christopher Palmer	2 episodes
2000	Running Mates	Aide Larry	TV movie
2001	NYPD Blue	Rob Liquori	2 episodes
2001	Dead Last	Dennis Budny	Main cast
2002	CSI: Crime Scene Investigation	Painter	Episode: "The Execution of Catherine Willows"
2002	The Practice	Mitchell Orbis	2 episodes
2003	The Division		Episode: "Baby It's Cold Outside"
2004	Las Vegas	Larry Phelan	Episode: "Catch of the Day"
2005	Eyes	Travis Dean	Episode: "Whereabouts"
2005	Blind Justice	Todd Moncrief	Episode: "In Your Face"
2005	Numbers	Herbert Quilty	Episode: "Convergence"
2006	NCIS	Stanley Springer	Episode: "Escaped"
2006	Ghost Whisperer	Dr. Epstein	2 episodes
2007	Standoff	Neal Polniaczek	Episode: "Backfire"
2007	Ghost Whisperer	Dr. Jay Hayes	Episode: "The Underneath"
2009	Life	Red Pesca	Episode: "I Heart Mom"
2010	Nip/Tuck	Dan Daly	Episode: "Dan Daly"
2010	Mandrake	Lin	TV movie
2012	Treme	Dr. Whaley	Episode: "Careless Love"
2013	Banshee	Senator Robert Schumacher	2 episodes
2013	Bonnie & Clyde	Doyle Johnson	Miniseries
2014	American Horror Story: Coven	Mr. Kingery	Episode: "The Seven Wonders"
2014	Drop Dead Diva	Parole Commissioner	2 episodes
2014	Satisfaction	Lionel Elkort	Episode: "Pilot"
2015	Zoo	Lawrence Fremer	Episode: "First Blood"
2015	South of Hell	Tory Culland	3 episodes
2015	The Magicians	Professor Van Der Weghe	Episode: "Unauthorized Magic"
2016	Game of Silence	Frank Cox	Episode: "Pilot"
2016	Underground	Reverend Willowset	4 episodes
2016	Roots	Benjamin Murray	Miniseries
2016	Halt and Catch Fire	Aaron	3 episodes
2017	Queen Sugar	Timothy North	Episode: "Freedom's Plow"
2018	Marvel's Cloak & Dagger	Peter Scarborough	Recurring (Season 1)
2018	American Horror Story: Apocalypse	Mr. Kingery	Episode: "Boy Wonder"
2019	ZeroZeroZero	Mark Shills	Episode: "The Shipment"
2019	Watchmen	The Suspect	Episode: "It's Summer and We're Running Out of Ice"
2019	The Birch	Don Bouchard	4 episodes
2020	Westworld	Therapist	Episode: "Parce Domine"
2020-2021	Your Honor	Johnny Zander	Miniseries

Video game roles
Year	Title	Role
2004	The Chronicles of Riddick: Escape from Butcher Bay	Binks / Abe / Moesgaard / Mosely / Padilla
2004	Men of Valor	White Marine 3
2009	The Chronicles of Riddick: Assault on Dark Athena	Binks / Abe / Moesgaard / Mosely / Padilla
