= Yugosphere =

Region of countries that formed Yugoslavia

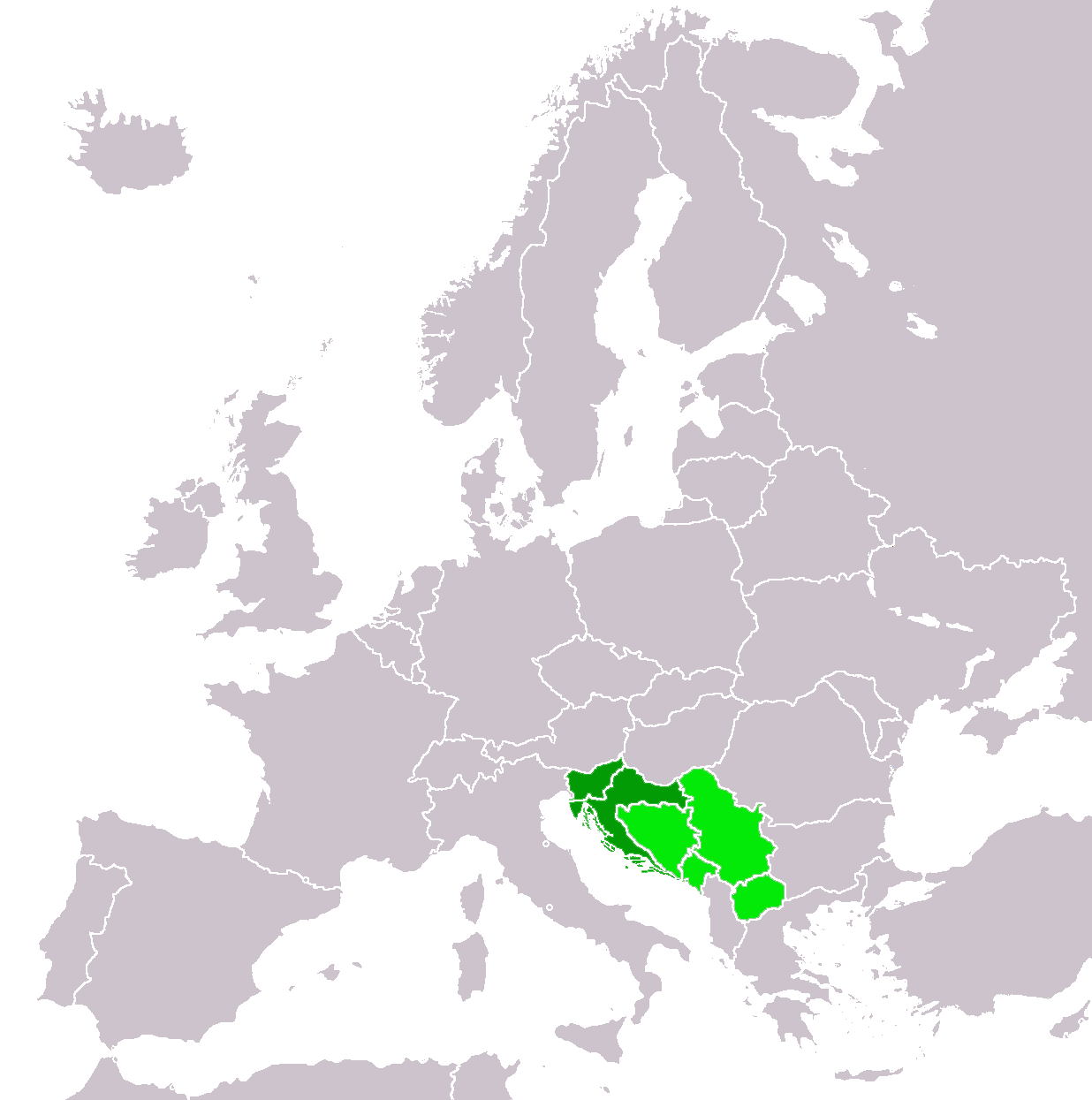
The region of the former Yugoslavia with EU member states (Slovenia 2004, Croatia 2013) in dark green and non-EU states in light green.

The Yugosphere (Macedonian, Slovene and Serbo-Croatian: Jugosfera, Југосфера) is a concept created in 2009 by British writer Tim Judah during his time as a senior visiting fellow at the European Institute of the London School of Economics. The Yugosphere refers to the social, linguistic, economic and cultural ties between the successor nations of the former Yugoslavia and how following the breakup of Yugoslavia these ties and bonds are being reforged to the benefit of the whole region. Judah has described the Yugosphere as "a way of describing the renewal of thousands of broken bonds across the former state," a social and political phenomenon with a certain political application. The concept also calls for a Benelux or Nordic Council style organisation in the former Yugoslavia to promote cooperation and integration as well as unified policy stances and foreign policy in order to benefit all nations as well as speed up European Union integration.

== Gallery ==
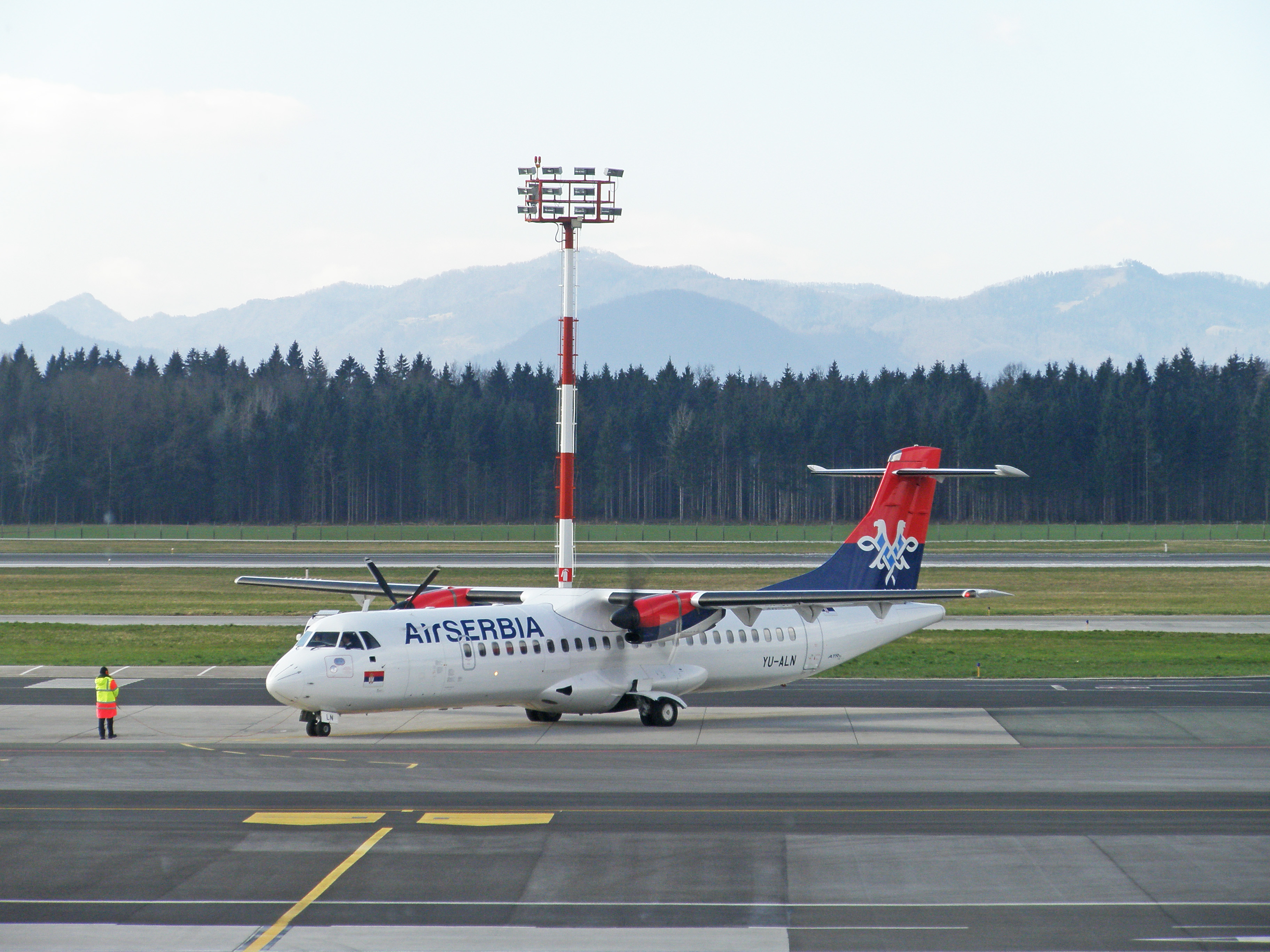
Air Serbia at the Ljubljana Airport

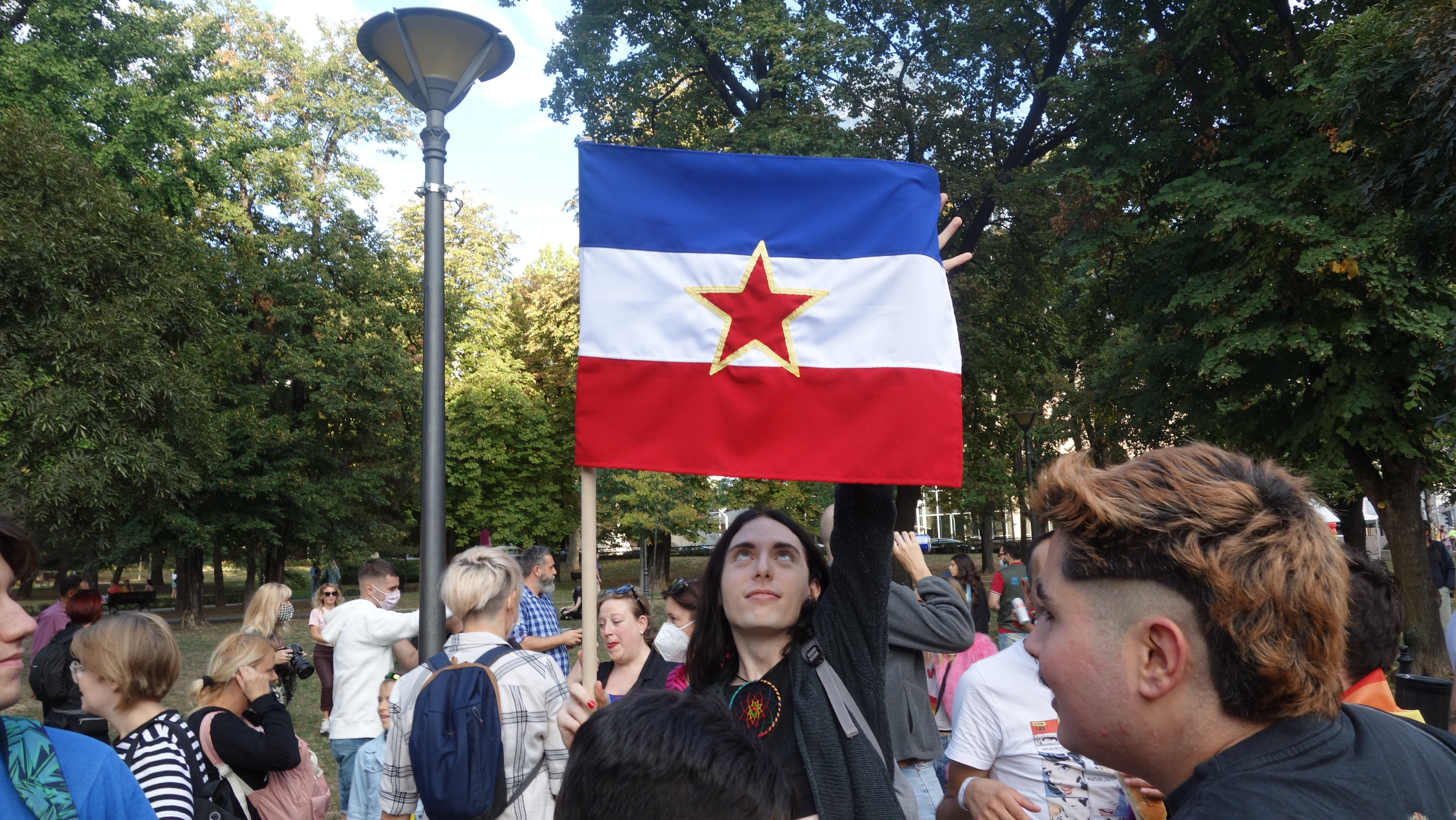
Yugoslav flag at the 2021 Belgrade Pride

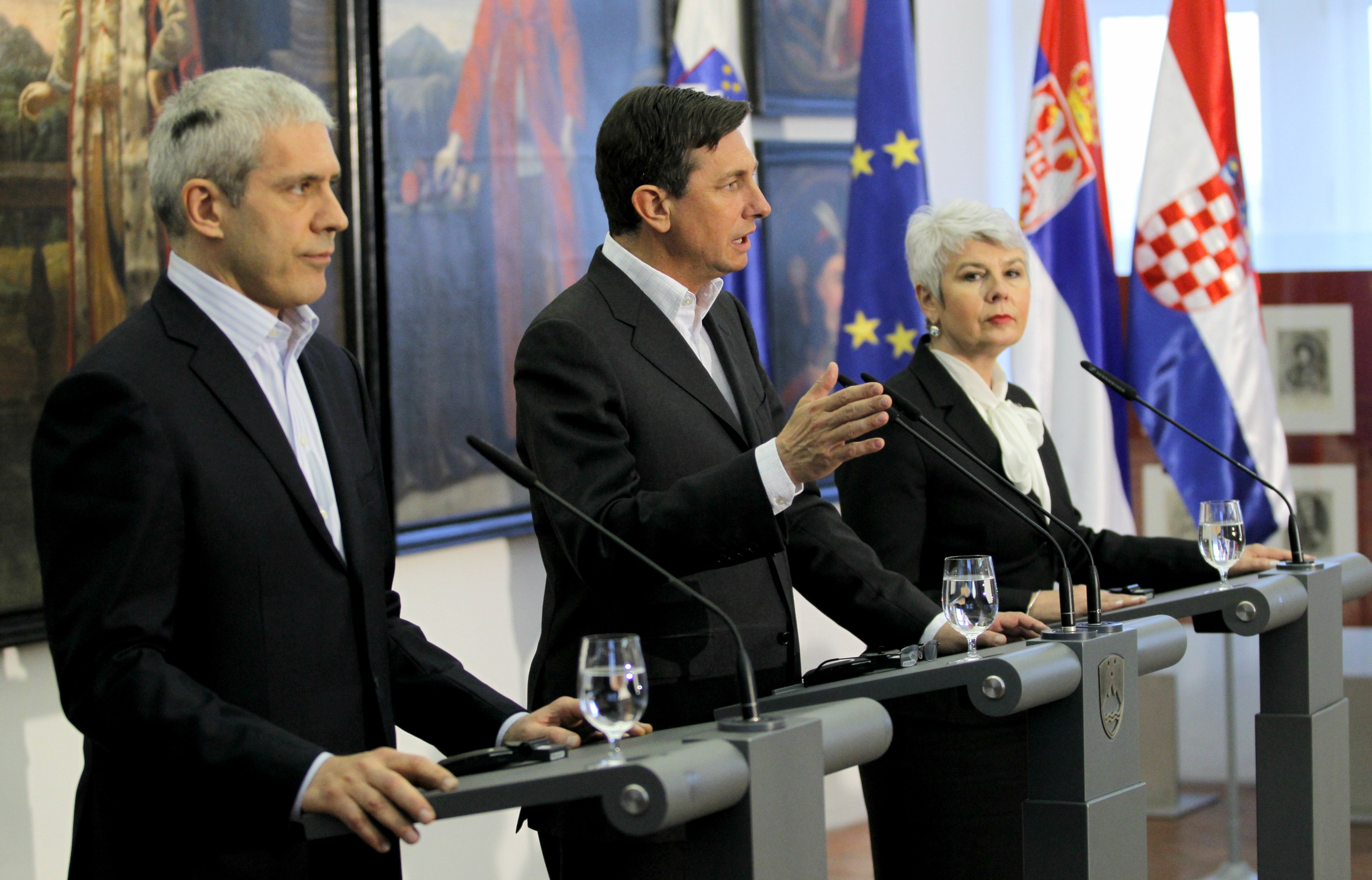
Boris Tadić of Serbia, Borut Pahor of Slovenia, and Jadranka Kosor of Croatia in 2010

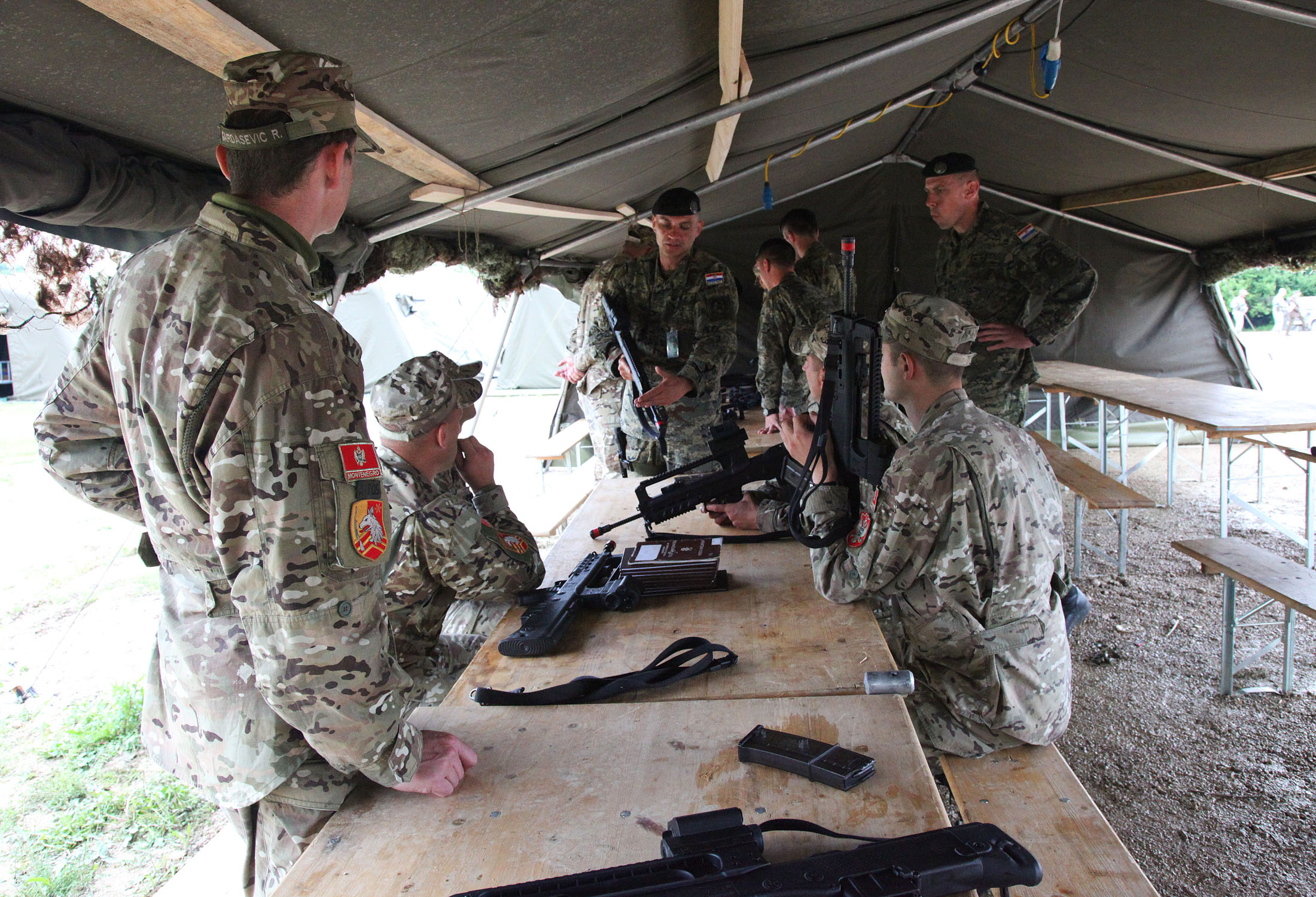
2012 Slunj Croatia-Albania-Bosnia and Herzegovina-Montenegro-Slovenia joint military exercise with Macedonian and Serbian observers

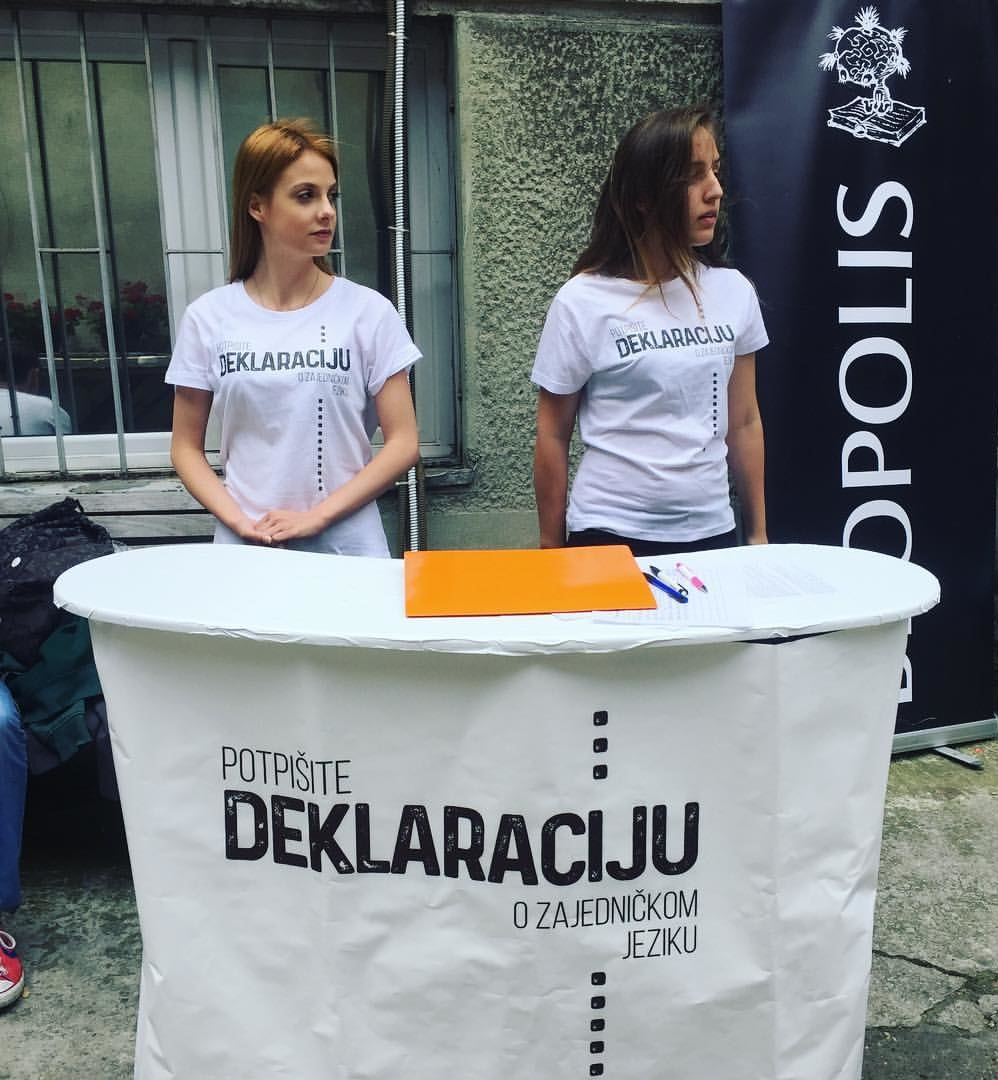
Collection of signatures for the Declaration on the Common Language

== See also ==
- Western Balkans
- Berlin Process
- Brdo-Brijuni Process
- Open Balkan
