= Dinotopia (TV series) =

- Based on: Dinotopia by James Gurney
- Starring: Erik von Detten; Shiloh Strong; Michael Brandon; Georgina Rylance; Sophie Ward; Lisa Zane; Jonathan Hyde
- Composer: Trevor Jones
- Country of origin: United States
- Original language: English
- No. of seasons: 1
- No. of episodes: 13

Production
- Running time: 60 minutes

Original release
- Network: ABC
- Release: November 28, 2002 – August 17, 2003

Dinotopia is an American television series based on the series of illustrated books of the same name by James Gurney, in which three Americans have crash-landed a plane and found themselves on a remote uncharted island inhabited by people and dinosaurs.

== Outline ==
US pilot Frank Scott, with his sons Karl and David, crash-lands a light plane in a tropical storm and they find themselves on an English-speaking island called Dinotopia, remote and undiscovered, where people live alongside dinosaurs, mostly peacefully.

The Scotts settle at Waterfall City, capital of Dinotopia, which then is affected by the arrival of a group called the Outsiders, who live outside the laws of Dinotopia. The Outsiders pose less of a danger than the featured Saurian antagonists, such as Pteranodon, Tyrannosaurus, and Postosuchus.

== Production ==
The series was produced as a sequel to the miniseries Dinotopia, broadcast in early 2002, and thirteen new episodes were filmed. None of the cast of the mini-series returned to their roles. Location shooting lasted for three months near Budapest, Hungary. Erik von Detten, Shiloh Strong, and Michael Brandon play Karl, David, and Frank Scott, while Georgina Rylance, Sophie Ward, and Jonathan Hyde are Marion, Rosemary, and Mayor Waldo, with Lisa Zane as Le Sage, leader of the Outsiders.

ABC first planned to launch the series in September 2002, but in the event waited until Thanksgiving in November. The network was disappointed by the 5.7 million viewers for Episode 1, but stated that it had been an "odd viewing night overall" and continued to broadcast the show. However, in December the viewing figures had not improved enough to satisfy the ABC network, and the series was canceled, with the result that only six of the thirteen episodes were aired on ABC, although all thirteen were broadcast in Europe in 2003.

Artisan Entertainment released the whole series on Region 1 DVD on January 20, 2004. This release was later discontinued and went out of print, but on March 15, 2016, Mill Creek Entertainment re-released the series on Region 1 DVD and also on Region 2 DVD in Europe.

== Cast ==
- Erik von Detten as Karl Scott
- Shiloh Strong as David Scott
- Michael Brandon as Frank Scott
- Omid Djalili as the voice of Zipeau
- Sophie Ward as Rosemary Waldo
- Lisa Zane as Le Sage
- Jonathan Hyde as Mayor Waldo
- Georgina Rylance as Marion Waldo
- Sian Brooke as Krista
- Zoltan Papp as Martino
- Zoltán Seress as Quint

== Episodes ==
No.	Title	Directed by	Written by	Original release date	Prod. code
1	"Marooned"	Thomas J. Wright	Raymond Khoury	November 28, 2002	101
2	"Making Good"	Thomas J. Wright	Raymond Khoury	November 28, 2002	102
3	"Handful of Dust"	David Winning	Nick Harding	December 5, 2002	104
4	"Le Sage"	Marco Brambilla & Mike Fash	Story by : Howard Ellis & Nick Harding; Teleplay by : Simon Moore	December 12, 2002	103
5	"Car Wars"	Mario Azzopardi	Story by : Nick Harding; Teleplay by : Simon Moore	December 19, 2002	106
6	"The Matriarch"	Mario Azzopardi & Marco Brambilla	Story by : Judy Morris; Teleplay by : Simon Moore	December 26, 2002	108
7	"Night of the Wartosa"	David Winning	Story by : Nick Harding; Teleplay by : Simon Moore	July 27, 2003	107
8	"The Big Fight"	Mike Fash & David Winning	Teleplay by : Simon Moore	July 13, 2003	105
9	"Contact"	Mario Azzopardi & Marco Brambilla	Story by : Raymond Khoury; Teleplay by : Simon Moore	July 20, 2003	109
10	"Lost & Found"	Mario Azzopardi	Raymond Khoury	July 6, 2003	110
11	"The Cure Part 1"	Thomas J. Wright	Unknown	August 3, 2003	111
12	"The Cure Part 2"	Thomas J. Wright	Unknown	August 10, 2003	112
13	"Crossroads"	Mario Azzopardi	Unknown	August 17, 2003	113

== Dinosaurs ==
- Ankylosaurus
- Brachiosaurus ("Brach")
- Chasmosaurus (incorrectly classified as a hadrosaur)
- Parasaurolophus ("Overlander"/Guard)
- Mosasaurus (more crocodilian in appearance than in the fossil record, with arms and legs instead of flippers)
- Postosuchus
- Pteranodon
- Quetzalcoatlus ("Skybax")
- Stegosaurus one makes a cameo during the first episode and has a bigger role in episode 3
- Dunkleosteus (resembles more of an eel-like creature than in real life, with spikes on its face instead of armor plating)
- Stenonychosaurus
- Tyrannosaurus rex
- Triceratops (mentioned by Captain Oonu after the first Tyrannosaurus attack)
- Dimorphodon (portrayed inaccurately as a feathered bird)
