= The Dirty South (film) =

2023 film by Matthew Yerby

- Release poster
- Directed by: Matthew Yerby
- Written by: Matthew Yerby
- Produced by: Andrew Vogel; Suzann Toni Petrongolo; Matthew Yerby; Todd Slater
- Starring: Willa Holland; Shane West; Dermot Mulroney
- Cinematography: Jess Dunlap
- Edited by: Laurent Dupepe
- Music by: Tyler Forrest
- Production company: VP Independent
- Distributed by: Cineverse
- Release dates: October 12, 2023 (Chelsea Film Festival); November 10, 2023
- Running time: 108 minutes
- Country: United States
- Language: English
- Budget: $1 million

The Dirty South is a 2023 crime thriller film starring Willa Holland, Shane West and Dermot Mulroney. It was written and directed by Matthew Yerby in his writing and directorial debut.

The film premiered at the Chelsea Film Festival on October 12, and was released theatrically by Cineverse and digitally on November 10, 2023.

== Premise ==
Sue Parker is thrust into a desperate struggle to rescue her family's failing business, teetering on the edge of ruin due to her father's negligence. With the arrival of a charming wanderer, she sees him as their sole hope to help prevent their bar from being seized by the merciless local tycoon. However, her seemingly simple plan soon leads to larceny and lawlessness, with deadly consequences

== Cast ==
- Willa Holland as Sue Parker
- Shane West as Dion
- Wayne Péré as Gary Parker
- Andrew Vogel as Mark Roy
- Suzann Toni Petrongolo as Donna
- Billy Hayes as Daryl Roy
- Caleb Quinney as Jacob Parker
- Gissette Valentin as Jaqueline
- Laura Cayouette as Jo Ann Roy
- Mike Manning as Eric
- Dermot Mulroney as Jeb Roy

== Production ==
In December 2022, it was reported that Dermot Mulroney, Willa Holland and Shane West was set to star in a Matthew Yerby written and directed film, The Dirty South. Yerby wrote the script in 2018, based on the small-town lifestyle he grew up with in Natchitoches, Louisiana. The original script had the film take place in summer months, but the day before filming Yerby changed the story because of the cold weather. He used the opportunity to write in the Christmas festival and its fireworks display.

On an estimated budget of $1 million, principal photography took place in late 2022 in Natchitoches, Louisiana.

== Release ==
In June 2023, Cineverse acquired all United States distribution rights.

The Dirty South premiered at the Chelsea Film Festival on October 12, 2023, where Jess Dunlap won the Best Cinematography award. It was released in theaters and digitally on November 10, 2023.

== Reception ==
On the review aggregator website Rotten Tomatoes, 88% of 8 critics' reviews are positive, with an average rating of 6.7/10.
