= Michael Eagar (cricketer) =

English cricketer (1934–2019)

Personal information
- Full name: Michael Antony Eagar
- Born: 20 March 1934; Kensington, London, England
- Died: 24 August 2019 (aged 85)
- Batting: Right-handed
- Role: Batsman

Domestic team information
- Years: Team
- 1956–1959: Oxford University
- 1957–1961: Gloucestershire

Career statistics
Competition	FC
Matches	58
Runs scored	2465
Batting average	25.41
100s/50s	1/16
Top score	125
Balls bowled	9
Wickets	0
Bowling average	–
5 wickets in innings	–
10 wickets in match	–
Best bowling	–
Catches/stumpings	46/–
- Source: Cricinfo, 22 April 2019

Michael Antony Eagar (20 March 1934 – 24 August 2019) was an English/Irish first-class cricketer. He played for Oxford University and Gloucestershire between 1956 and 1961. He also played cricket and hockey for Ireland. His father, Frederick Maitland Eagar (1896–1943) captained Ireland at hockey.

Mike Eagar was educated at Rugby School and Worcester College, Oxford. His highest first-class score was 125 against Free Foresters in 1956 in his third first-class match.

He became a teacher at Eton College and later at Shrewsbury School. His death was reported in The Times in August 2019.
