= Under the Sun (Maya Shenfeld album) =

Studio album by Maya Shenfeld
- Released: 23 February 2024
- Genre: Electronic
- Length: 39:15
- Label: Thrill Jockey
- Producer: Maya Shenfeld

Maya Shenfeld chronology
| In Free Fall (2022) | Under the Sun (2024) |

Under the Sun is the second studio album by Berlin-based composer Maya Shenfeld, released on 23 February 2024 through Thrill Jockey. It received acclaim from critics.

== Critical reception ==
Professional ratings
Aggregate scores
| Source | Rating |
|---|---|
| Metacritic | 84/100 |
Review scores
| Source | Rating |
| Clash | 8/10 |
| Mojo | 4/5 stars |
| Uncut | 8/10 |

Under the Sun received a score of 84 out of 100 on review aggregator Metacritic based on four critics' reviews, indicating "universal acclaim". Uncut described the album as "elemental and menacing", while Mojo called it "an elegant, thought-provoking record". Nick Roseblade of Clash found that Shenfeld has "expanded her sonic palate and used an old proverb 'there's nothing new under the sun' as a launch pad" as she "manages to coax new emotions from her synths that [others] couldn't". Reviewing the album for The Quietus, Ian Opolot called it "a mirage that is every bit dazzling, piercing (at times haunting) in its use of synthesisers, organs and the distant-memory-like sound of the Ritter Youth Choir".

== Track listing ==
Under the Sun track listing
| No. | Title | Length |
|---|---|---|
| 1. | "A Guide for the Perplexed" | 7:12 |
| 2. | "Tehom" | 3:28 |
| 3. | "Geist" | 4:13 |
| 4. | "Interstellar" | 4:37 |
| 5. | "Light, Refracted" | 2:47 |
| 6. | "On Its Rounds the Wind Returns" | 5:40 |
| 7. | "Sedek" | 3:21 |
| 8. | "Analemma" | 7:57 |
| Total length: | | 39:15 |

== Personnel ==
- Maya Shenfeld – composer, producer, mixing, modular synthesizers and electronics
- Omer Idan – oboe
- Gineke Pranger – recorders
- Ann-Kristin Mayr – conductor (Youth Choir Ritterchor)
- James Ginzburg – composer and producer (track 7)
- Tadklimp – additional production (tracks 5, 6 and 8) and mixing
- Rashad Becker – mastering
- Gal Shenfeld – artwork
- Daniel Castrejón – design
