= Tim Judah =

British writer, reporter and political analyst (born 1962)

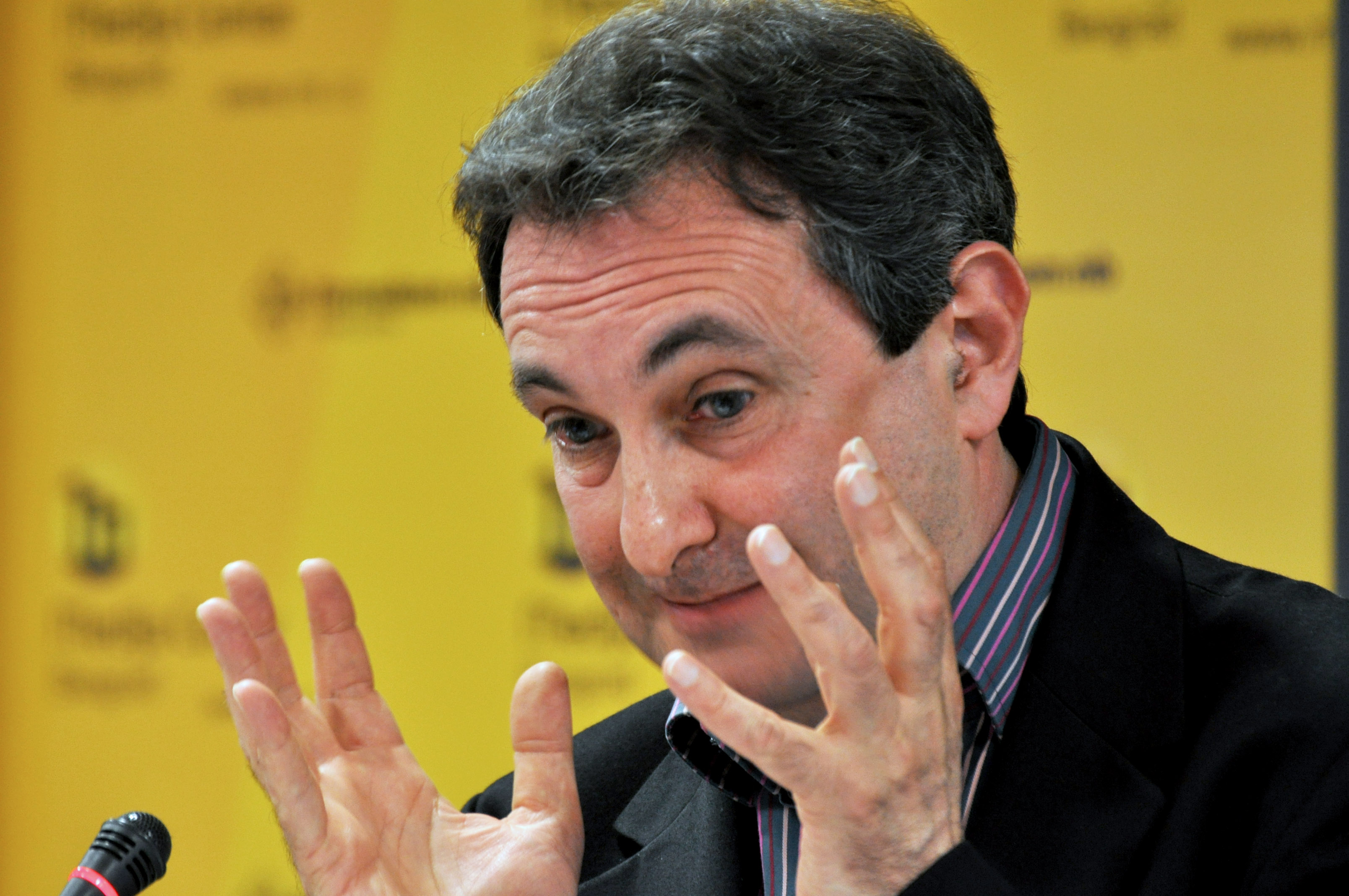
- Tim Judah in 2012
- Born: 1962 (age 63–64); London, England
- Occupations: Writer, reporter, political analyst
- Notable work: The Serbs: History, Myth, and the Destruction of Yugoslavia

Tim Judah (born 1962) is a British writer, reporter and political analyst for The Economist. Judah has written several books on the geopolitics of the Balkans, mainly focusing on historical and present relations between Serbia and Kosovo and Serbs and Kosovar Albanians.

== Early life and education ==
Tim Judah was born in London in 1962 and was raised in a family of Baghdadi Jewish descent whose tradition maintains they first came to Iraq from the ancient Kingdom of Judah at the time of the Babylonian Exile. His ancestors include Solomon Ma'tuk.

The Judah family was later established in Calcutta as part of the Baghdadi Jewish community before migrating to Britain.

Judah attended Charterhouse School followed by the London School of Economics. He also studied at the Fletcher School of Law and Diplomacy at Tufts University.

== Career ==
Tim Judah began his career at the African service of the BBC World Service.

He has reported from many flashpoints around the world, including the states of the former Yugoslavia, El Salvador, Iraq, Iran, Afghanistan, Niger, Darfur, Uganda, North Korea, Georgia, Armenia, Haiti and Ukraine. Judah has been described by The Guardian newspaper as "a distinguished foreign correspondent." As a writer his style combines reportage, interviews and history and his main focus, as a journalist, has been on conflict in Africa and Eastern Europe, in particular the Balkans.

Based abroad as a foreign correspondent, Judah lived in Bucharest from 1990 to 1991 where he covered the fall of communism for The Times and The Economist. He was based in Belgrade to cover the conflicts surrounding the breakup of the former Yugoslavia. In 1997, based on his reporting of the Yugoslav Wars Judah criticized "academics imbued with a two dimensional view of the world" such as Francis Fukuyama for discussing the revolutions of 1989 as heralding the end of history. He returned to London in 1995 but continues to travel frequently to the Balkans.

He has written three books on the Balkans region, including The Serbs: History, Myth and the Destruction of Yugoslavia published by Yale University Press in 1997 and Kosovo: War And Revenge with the same publisher in 2002. Regarding the Kosovo-Serbia question, Judah writes in his The Serbs: History, Myth and the Destruction of Yugoslavia in the section '"Kosovo: Land of Revenge" that the reincorporation of Kosovo to Serbia in 1944 was "the equivalent of reincorporating a cancer into the Serbian body politic".

He was an eyewitness to many of the battles of the Yugoslav Wars including the siege of Dubrovnik and the battle of Vukovar. Judah is considered an authority on Balkan politics. As a senior visiting fellow at the European Institute of the London School of Economics in 2009, he developed the concept of the Yugosphere. He has described the Yugosphere as "a way of describing the renewal of thousands of broken bonds across the former state," a social and political phenomenon with a certain political application. In the Balkans itself, he is president of the board of the Balkan Investigative Reporting Network and a member of the board of the Kosovar Stability Initiative.

Elsewhere in Eastern Europe, Judah has reported on the Euromaidan Revolution and the War in Donbas. His most recent book In Wartime: Stories from Ukraine was published in December 2015. Judah's work on Africa has included a BBC Radio 4 documentary on Mouridism. His work has also touched on African sporting achievements with his 2008 book Bikila: Ethiopia's Barefoot Runner shortlisted for the best new sportswriter category in the 2009 British Sports Book Awards.

Judah has also worked in 2013 as a regular columnist for Bloomberg.

He has celebrated the Jewish festival of Passover in both Baghdad during the American invasion of 2003 and Donetsk during the Russian invasion of 2014.

== Personal life ==
Judah is married to writer and publisher Rosie Whitehouse and has five children, one of whom is the journalist Ben Judah.

== Publications ==
- The Serbs: History, Myth, and the Destruction of Yugoslavia. Yale University Press. 2000. ISBN 978-0-300-08507-5.
- Kosovo: War and Revenge. Yale University Press. 2002. ISBN 978-0-300-09725-2.
- Bikila: Ethiopia's Barefoot Olympian. Reportage Press. 2008. ISBN 978-0-9558302-1-1.
- Kosovo: What Everyone Needs to Know. Oxford University Press. 29 August 2008. ISBN 978-0-19-974103-8.
- In Wartime: Stories from Ukraine. Allen Lane / Penguin. 1 December 2015. ISBN 978-0241198827.
