= Pulse (2001 film) =

2001 Japanese horror film by Kiyoshi Kurosawa

- Theatrical release poster
- Directed by: Kiyoshi Kurosawa
- Written by: Kiyoshi Kurosawa
- Produced by: Shun Shimizu; Seiji Okuda; Ken Inoue; Atsuyuki Shomoda
- Starring: Haruhiko Katô; Kumiko Asō; Koyuki; Kurume Arisaka; Masatoshi Matsuo; Show Aikawa; Jun Fubuki; Shinji Takeda; Koji Yakusho
- Cinematography: Jun'ichirô Hayashi
- Edited by: Junichi Kikuchi
- Music by: Takefumi Haketa
- Production companies: Daiei Film; NTV Network; Hakuhodo; Imagica
- Distributed by: Toho
- Release date: 3 February 2001 (Japan)
- Running time: 119 minutes
- Country: Japan
- Language: Japanese
- Box office: $318,451

Pulse (Japanese: 回路, Hepburn: Kairo; lit. 'Circuit') is a 2001 Japanese techno-horror film written and directed by Kiyoshi Kurosawa. It was screened in the Un Certain Regard section at the 2001 Cannes Film Festival. The plot follows two separate storylines in Japan that faces mass disappearances amidst a ghostly invasion of the real world via the Internet. One follows a college student, and the other follows a plant shop worker.

The film received positive reviews and attracted a cult following. An English-language remake, Pulse, debuted in 2006 and produced two sequels. Kurosawa adapted the script into a novel.

== Plot ==
Michi Kudo, newly moved to Tokyo, works at a plant shop with Junko Sasano, Toshio Yabe, and Taguchi, who has been missing for several days while working on a computer disk for the shop's sales. Michi goes to Taguchi's apartment and finds him distracted and aloof; while looking for the disk, she turns and finds he has hanged himself, his decaying body making her question who she had spoken to earlier. The disk reveals an endless loop of images of Taguchi staring into his monitor, while a ghostly face appears on another screen.

Yabe receives a distorted phone call saying "help me" and sees the same image from Taguchi's disk on his phone. At Taguchi's apartment, he finds a black stain on the wall where Taguchi hanged himself, as well as a printed note reading "a forbidden room." Outside the apartment, he notices a door sealed with red tape and enters, only to encounter a ghost.

Yabe disappears for a few days before returning to work, acting distant and strange. He warns Michi not to enter "the forbidden room." Soon after, Michi's boss also goes missing, and she receives a call at work from Yabe, who repeats, "Help me." Looking for him in the shop's storage room, she instead finds a stain on the wall, similar to the one in Taguchi's apartment. Junko, searching for their boss, enters a "forbidden room" in the building. Michi pulls Junko away from a ghost, but the encounter leaves Junko in a catatonic state. Later, in Michi's apartment, Junko walks towards a wall, dissolving into a black stain that scatters. Worried, Michi leaves Tokyo to check on her mother when her calls go unanswered.

Simultaneously, Ryosuke Kawashima, a university economics student, has recently signed with a new ISP. His computer accesses a website by itself, displaying disturbing images of people alone in dark rooms. That night, Ryosuke wakes to find his computer on again, showing the same images, and frantically unplugs it. The next day, he visits the university computer lab and meets Harue Karasawa, a postgraduate computer science student, who suggests bookmarking the page or screenshotting the images for her to examine. Ryosuke attempts to do so, but his computer refuses his commands, instead playing a video of a man with a plastic bag over his head, sitting in a room with "help me" written all over the walls.

A graduate student tells Ryosuke his theory that the dead are invading the physical world. Harue starts behaving strangely, believing that ghosts are trying to trap the living in their loneliness rather than kill them. Ryosuke tries to escape with her by train, but it stops, and Harue returns to her apartment. She witnesses the man with the plastic bag shoot himself on her computer screen before it cuts to a live video of her. As she embraces the invisible figure watching her, Harue, who has always felt lonely, happily says that she is "not alone". When Ryosuke arrives, she has disappeared.

The ghosts launch a full-scale invasion of the Kantō region, resulting in the disappearances of people en masse, and an evacuation of Tokyo commences. Ryosuke meets Michi while looking for Harue, and the two find her in an abandoned factory. Mimicking the man she saw on her computer, Harue removes a plastic bag from her head and shoots herself. When Ryosuke and Michi's car runs out of gas, Ryosuke searches a warehouse for fuel and inadvertently enters a "forbidden room", where a ghost tells him that "death is eternal loneliness." Although he initially resists the ghost's influence, Ryosuke loses the will to live, and Michi pulls him to safety. They drive through Tokyo, now completely abandoned, and witness numerous apocalyptic sights. After reaching Tokyo Bay and attempting to leave the city by motorboat, they are rescued by a ship crewed by survivors, who reveal that the same events are happening worldwide.

As the ship sets off for Latin America, the captain reassures Michi that she was right to continue living. She returns to her room and finds Ryosuke sitting against the wall with his eyes closed. He fades into a stain on the wall as Michi reflects on finding happiness in being alone with her last friend in the world.

== Cast ==
- Kumiko Asō as Michi Kudo
- Haruhiko Kato as Ryosuke Kawashima, a college student
- Koyuki as Harue Karasawa, Ryosuke's friend and love interest
- Kurume Arisaka as Junko Sasano, Michi's friend
- Masatoshi Matsuo as Toshio Yabe, Michi's friend
- Shinji Takeda as Yoshizaki
- Jun Fubuki as Michi's mother
- Shun Sugata as Boss
- Koji Yakusho as Ship Captain
- Show Aikawa as Employee
- Kenji Mizuhashi as Taguchi, Michi's friend

== Release ==
Pulse was first released in Japan on February 3, 2001, where it was distributed by Toho. Distant Horizon purchased worldwide distribution rights to the film from Daiei. The film premiered in the Un Certain Regard category at the Cannes Film Festival.

== Home video ==
The film was released on DVD by Magnolia Home Entertainment on February 21, 2006. Arrow Video published Blu-ray release of the film in July 2017.

== Critical reception ==
The review aggregator Rotten Tomatoes gives the film a rating of 76% based on 55 reviews, and a rating average of 6.8/10. The website's critical consensus reads: "A sinister spine-tingling techno-thriller whose artistry lies in the power of suggestion rather than a barrage of blood and guts or horror shop special effects". Metacritic, which uses a weighted average, assigned the film a score of 68 out of 100, based on 21 critics, indicating "generally favorable" reviews.

AllMovie praised the film, writing: "The first 30 minutes of Kairo is perhaps some of the most unnerving, frightening sequences to come down the pike in a long time". Anita Gates of The New York Times wrote: "There are very few moments in Kiyoshi Kurosawa's fiercely original, thrillingly creepy horror movie that don't evoke a dreamlike dread of the truly unknown". Slant gave the film four stars out of four: "Kurosawa's movies have a genuinely unnerving effect on the viewer because they deal with the kind of loneliness that exists in an overcrowded world. [...] Pulse is his strongest elucidation of this theme, treating the World Wide Web as a literal snare forging sinewy connections between strangers where the ultimate destination is chaos". The Guardian called it "an incredibly creepy horror film" that, in the same way as Ring, "finds chills in the most dingy and mundane of locales; skillful deployment of grisly little moments and disturbing, cryptic imagery produce the requisite mood of dread and gloom". Film Threat wrote: "What's worse than a horror film that frightens you sleepless is one that disturbs you to depression". The Washington Post commented: "Pulse is best enjoyed if it's not questioned too closely. It lives visually in a way it cannot live intellectually".

Entertainment Weekly was critical of the film, writing: "watching Pulse [...] you could almost die of anticipation", commenting that "nothing in the two snail-paced hours [...] makes close to a shred of sense". The Seattle Times criticized the film's storyline and length, writing "while it's rattling your nerves, Pulse leaves your brain wanting more", and The Village Voice called the film "at least half an hour too long".

In 2012, Jaime N Christley of Slant listed the film as one of the greatest of all time. In the early 2010s, Time Out conducted a poll with several authors, directors, actors and critics who have worked within the horror genre to vote for their top horror films. The film was ranked as number 65 on the 2020 version of the same list.

The scene in which Yabe encounters a ghost for the first time has received attention for being especially frightening without using jump scares or loud sound effects; Scott Tobias, writing for The A.V. Club, described it as "arguably the signature sequence in all of J-horror".

== Remakes ==
Following the premiere at the Un Certain Regard, Dimension Films acquired the rights to the Japanese film, as well as the rights to a remake. The remake was released in 2006 to negative reception.

In 2026, a second remake was announced to be in development under Screen Gems and Spyglass Media Group. Dave Boyle is attached to direct while Parker Finn will produce.

== See also ==
- List of ghost films
