= Rosie Whitehouse =

British historical researcher, journalist and author

Rosie Whitehouse is a British historical researcher, journalist and author.

== Biography ==
Whitehouse studied International History at the London School of Economics and took up a career at the BBC World Service.

As a researcher, she has extensively documented the experience of Holocaust survivors in Europe in the aftermath of the Second World War. She has reported on remembrance efforts and assaults on Holocaust memory in Ukraine, Poland, Germany, Italy and the United Kingdom.

Her historical research and profiles of Holocaust Survivors have been published by The Observer, The Jewish Chronicle, BBC News and Tablet magazine. Meanwhile, her writing about British government policy toward victims after the Holocaust and contemporary British antisemitism has appeared in The Independent and Haaretz.

She has also participated in raising awareness of the Rwandan genocide as the publisher of survivor's testimonies.

Whitehouse is married to the journalist Tim Judah, and spent five years in the Balkans during the Yugoslav Wars with her family, which she documented in her memoir Are We There Yet. Her writing engages with the topics of war trauma and support for post-conflict victims. She lives in West London with her husband. The couple have five children, one of whom is the journalist Ben Judah.

== Selected works ==
- South of France (Take the Kids). Cadogan, 2003
- Are We There Yet. Reportage Press, 2007
- Paris for families Dorling Kindersley, 2011
- The People On The Beach: Journeys to Freedom After the Holocaust, 2021

== See also ==
- Dart Center for Journalism and Trauma
