= Justin Kerr-Smiley =

British journalist

Justin Kerr-Smiley (born 25 April 1965) is a writer and journalist who lives in London, England.

== Education ==
Kerr-Smiley was educated at Ampleforth College and Newcastle University and completed post graduate studies in broadcast journalism in 1990. As a correspondent Kerr-Smiley has reported from Northern Ireland, the Balkans and South America. He is a member of the Society of Authors and was awarded a travel scholarship in 2011. He is also a published poet.

== Career ==
Under The Sun was first published in 2007. The novel is set in the South Pacific during the closing stages of World War II. It is the story of the relationship between an RAF pilot who is shot down and taken prisoner, and the Japanese officer in charge of him. The Sunday Telegraph described it as "a small masterpiece; the best novel that I have read about war since Captain Corelli's Mandolin." Under The Sun is now published by Arcadia Books.

== Interviews ==
- Review and interview in The Daily Telegraph
- An interview by Paul Vlitos
