= Techno-horror =

Genre of fiction

Techno-horror is a sub-genre of science fiction and horror that focuses on concerns with and fears of technology. The stories are often cautionary tales created during periods of rapid technological advancement that express concerns about privacy, freedom, individuality, and wealth disparity. They often take place in dystopian settings.

== Criteria ==
Techno-horror focuses on how technology can be a direct or indirect force of evil or destruction. Direct evil, such as death caused directly by the technology; or indirect, such as discussing the power of technology and the potential for people to use it as a means to extort and exploit others. It sometimes aligns with themes and philosophies of Neo-Luddism. It relies on elements of science fiction or fantasy, which set it apart from the techno-thriller genre.

== History ==
The overthrow or destruction of the human race by mechanical automatons is likely the oldest form of techno-horror, with examples such as the Greek Myth Talos dating back to 400 BC.

Shelley's 1818 novel Frankenstein is widely considered the first sci-fi novel, and it may be interpreted as the basic premise of technological advancement resulting in the creation of dangerous artificial beings. However, this novel relies more on fears of occultism, medicine and forbidden knowledge than it does of electronic technology, thus is not techno-horror in the proper sense.

Artificial forms of intelligence became a topic of debate in the mid 19th century following theories of evolution. Samuel Butler's 1863 article Darwin among the Machines is a non-fiction essay which discussed the potential risks and possibility of the human race being superseded by thinking machines.

Another early form of techno-horror in film is nuclear terror. In Japan, Godzilla stood as a metaphor for the Atomic bombings of Hiroshima and Nagasaki. In The United States, the Cold War induced a fear of nuclear power and radiation, particularly the aftermath of bombing and the danger of weapons testing to civilians. For example, in the 1968 film Night of the Living Dead, nuclear radiation is the cause of the zombie apocalypse.

Other stories, originating mostly in Japanese horror, involve classical terrors such as ghosts, spirits or curses propagating, traveling, or communicating via hi-tech media such as computer networks, cell phones, and cameras. Here, technology is not a threat on its own, but a conduit for dark forces. The subgenre is notably popular in the West and Japan and was likely influenced by myths and legends associated with EVPs.

== Examples ==
=== Films ===
- The Day the Earth Stood Still (1951)
- Godzilla (1954)
- Forbidden Planet (1956)
- Midnight Lace (1960)
- Night of the Living Dead (1968)
- Colossus: The Forbin Project (1970)
- The Stepford Wives (1975)
- The Car (1977)
- Demon Seed (1977)
- Scanners (1981)
- Poltergeist (1982)
- Videodrome (1983)
- Christine (1983)
- The Terminator (1984)
- C.H.U.D. (1984)
- Deadly Friend (1986)
- Chopping Mall (1986)
- The Fly (1986)
- Maximum Overdrive (1986)
- Robocop (1987)
- Tetsuo: The Iron Man (1989)
- Hardware (1990)
- The Lawnmower Man (1992)
- Ring (1998)
- Existenz (1999)
- The Matrix (1999)
- Pulse (2001)
- The Ring (2002)
- Shutter (2004)
- White Noise (2005)
- Prometheus (2012)
- Elysium (2013)
- Ex Machina (2014)
- Unfriended (2015)
- Kill Command (2016)
- Host (2020)
- M3GAN (2022)
- Afraid (2024)

=== Video games ===
- System Shock (1994)
- I Have No Mouth, and I Must Scream (1995)
- Fallout (1997)
- Fatal Frame (2001)
- Enslaved: Odyssey to the West (2010)
- Five Nights at Freddy's (2014)
- DreadOut (2014)
- SOMA (2015)
- Observer (2017)
- Little Nightmares II (2021)

=== Novels and literature ===
- Nineteen Eighty-Four (1949)
- I, Robot (1950)
- Second Variety (1953)
- I Have No Mouth, and I Must Scream (1967)
- Do Androids Dream of Electric Sheep? (1968)
- Christine (1983)
- Ghost in the Shell (1989)
- The Metamorphosis of Prime Intellect (2002)
- Cell (2006)
- Under the Dome (2009)

== See also ==
- Science fiction horror
- Technophobia
- Isekai
- Tech noir
- Postmodern horror
- Art horror
- The Cold War
- Techno-thriller
