= Georgina Rylance =

English actress (born 1976)

Georgina Elizabeth Rylance (born 20 April 1976) is an English actress, best known for Dinotopia.

== Early life ==
Born in Ladbroke Grove in 1976, Rylance has a younger sister, Charlotte, and is the daughter of Judge John Rylance KC, a circuit judge, by his marriage to Philippa Bailey. She was educated at St Paul's Girls' School, London, Downe House School, St Edward's School, Oxford, and Oxford Brookes University.

After being recruited in a pub on the Portobello Road, London, during the Notting Hill Carnival, the eighteen-year-old Rylance embarked on a short modelling career which included a Coca-Cola commercial. However, it ended when she accepted a place at Oxford Brookes to read politics and publishing.

After leaving Oxford Brookes, Rylance trained at the London Academy of Music and Dramatic Art. While she was a drama student, she was a regular in the audience at the Gate Theatre.

== Screen career ==
Rylance's first screen role was in Howard Davies's television movie Armadillo (2001) as Amabel. She played Marion Waldo in ABC's thirteen-part television series of Dinotopia, Helena in Spartacus (a TV movie for USA Network, 2004), Rachel Kelly, the on-screen daughter of Mark Rylance (unrelated), in The Government Inspector (2005), and Suza in the film 7 Seconds (2005). Other television appearances include Manchild, Keen Eddie, As If, The Inspector Lynley Mysteries, Scooterman, New Tricks, Agatha Christie's Poirot, and War Machine.

== Theatre ==
In 2015, Rylance starred in Chekhov's Uncle Vanya, and in 2017 appeared in a revival of Noël Coward’s "This Was a Man" at the Finborough Theatre.

== Personal life ==
In 2008, Rylance met Greg Bailey, a Canadian doctor, in Los Angeles and in 2009 was living with him in an apartment in Knightsbridge, Westminster. The same year, she spent a month in Antarctica and several weeks in Peru, working in an orphanage.

In April 2015, her father announced Rylance's engagement to Giuseppe (Peppe) Ciardi, and their son was born in 2016. Ciardi, a hedge fund manager, was a widower with three grown-up children, having lost his wife in a boating accident in 2005.
