= Gary J. Tunnicliffe =

British special make-up effects designer, writer and director

- Born: Gary John Tunnicliffe; 27 February 1968 (age 58); Burntwood, Staffordshire, England
- Occupations: Special make-up effects; director; screenwriter
- Spouse: Georgiana Pana Tunnicliffe

Gary John Tunnicliffe (born 27 February 1968) is an English special make-up effects designer, writer, and director. He has performed make-up effects in all the Hellraiser films from Hellraiser III: Hell on Earth (1992) to Hellraiser: Hellworld (2005), wrote Hellraiser: Revelations (2011), and wrote and directed Hellraiser: Judgment (2018). His other make-up credits include Candyman (1992), Wishmaster (1997), the Dracula 2000 series, the Pulse series, and Feast (2005).

== Career ==
Tunnicliffe started out performing special make-up effects. After collaborating with Bob Keen on make-up effects for writer-director Anthony Hickox's Waxwork II: Lost in Time (1992), he joined them again for Hickox's next project, Hellraiser III: Hell on Earth (1992). Special effects technician Kevin Yagher, when selected to direct Hellraiser: Bloodline (1996), contacted Tunnicliffe to perform the special effects on that film. Tunnicliffe was surprised Yagher was not performing the effects work himself, but Yagher believed Tunnicliffe's experience with the prior film would be valuable. Tunnicliffe returned for Scott Derrickson's Hellraiser: Inferno (2000) and Rick Bota's Hellraiser: Hellseeker (2002). He again collaborated with Bota in the next two sequels, both released in 2005. In Hellraiser: Deader, he also directed the second unit and had a cameo appearance. In Hellraiser: Hellworld, Tunnicliffe performed special effects, make-up effects, and collected the Hellraiser memorabilia used in the film. Tunnicliffe appeared in the film as a Cenobite and, briefly, without make-up near the end. In Hellraiser: Revelations (2011), he wrote the script for director Víctor Garcia. He wrote and directed the tenth Hellraiser sequel, Judgment.

In addition to his work on the Hellraiser films, Tunnicliffe has worked with Clive Barker on Candyman (1992) and Lord of Illusions (1995). Tunnicliffe has also worked with Patrick Lussier on several films, including the Dracula 2000 series, My Bloody Valentine 3D (2009), and Drive Angry (2011). Other franchises include Pulse (2006) and its sequels, Mimic 2 (2001) and Mimic 3: Sentinel (2003), and Scream 4 (2011). Besides Hellraiser: Judgment, Tunnicliffe's feature directing work includes the fairy tale films Hansel and Gretel (2002) and Jack and the Beanstalk (2009). He also directed the short films No More Souls (2004) and The Chicken Run (2015), which are set in the Hellraiser and The Texas Chain Saw Massacre universes, respectively.

== Filmography ==
Year	Title	Director	Writer
1996	Within the Rock	Yes	Yes
2001	Guardian	No	Yes
2002	Hansel & Gretel	Yes	Yes
2004	Megalodon	No	Yes
2004	No More Souls: One Last Slice of Sensation	Yes	Yes
2009	Jack and the Beanstalk	Yes	Yes
2011	Hellraiser: Revelations	No	Yes
2015	The Chicken Run	Yes	Yes
2018	Hellraiser: Judgment	Yes	Yes
TBA	Coulrophobia	Yes	Yes

== Bibliography ==
- Kane, Paul (2013). The Hellraiser Films and Their Legacy. McFarland & Company. ISBN 9781476600697.
