= Paul Kane (writer) =

British writer (born 1973)

- Born: 1973 (age 52–53); Chesterfield, Derbyshire, England
- Education: Sheffield Hallam University
- Occupation: Writer
- Spouse: Marie O'Regan

Paul Kane (born 1973 in Chesterfield, Derbyshire, England) is an English writer.

== Beginnings ==
Kane began his professional writing career in 1996, providing articles and reviews for news-stand publications, and started producing dark fantasy and science fiction stories in 1998.

== Career ==
Kane has a B.A. and M.A. from Sheffield Hallam University and in the past has worked as a photographer, an artist, an illustrator/cartoonist and a professional proofreader. He has also worked as a lecturer in Art and Creative Writing at Chesterfield College in the UK and served as Special Publications Editor for the British Fantasy Society, where he has edited publications featuring authors such as Clive Barker, Neil Gaiman, Brian Aldiss and Muriel Gray.

His latest writing projects include film work, a graphic adaptation of his Torturer story with artist Ian Simmons, an entry in the Cinema Macabre book introduced by Jonathan Ross and featuring Simon Pegg, Mark Gatiss and Jeremy Dyson, and a book examining the Hellraiser movies, introduced by Doug "Pinhead" Bradley: The Hellraiser Films and Their Legacy.

Kane's Shadow Writer site was launched on Halloween 2001.

He is married to author and editor Marie O'Regan.

== Bibliography ==
- Alone (In the Dark)
- Touching the Flame
- FunnyBones
- Signs of Life
- The Hellraiser Films and Their Legacy
- Hellbound Hearts (edited by Marie O'Regan) (2010)
- The Lazarus Condition
- Dalton Quayle Rides Out
- The Afterblight Chronicles: Arrowhead (Abaddon Books, September 2008, ISBN 1-905437-76-5)
- Sherlock Holmes and the Servants of Hell (Solaris Books, 2016, ISBN 978-1-78108-454-0)
- 100 Ways to Write a Book - 100 authors in conversation with Alex Pearl about their backgrounds, motivations and working methods (Bolzwinick Books, 2022, ISBN 979-8777608314)

== See also ==
- List of horror fiction writers
