= Hellbound Hearts =

Short story collection set in the world of Hellraiser

- First edition
- Author: Paul Kane and Marie O'Regan (editors); Clive Barker (creator, introduction)
- Cover artist: Clive Barker
- Genre: Horror fiction
- Publisher: Pocket Books
- Publication date: 2009
- Pages: 326

Hellbound Hearts is a 2009 anthology of short stories set in the world of Clive Barker's Hellraiser. It was edited by Hellraiser expert Paul Kane and his wife Marie O'Regan. The book features works by several authors.

== Development ==
In his interview, Kane said that he is a longtime fan of Clive Barker and after writing his book The Hellraiser Films and Their Legacy he felt that someone should do something similar to the Hellraiser comics but in prose form, since the mythos of the franchise is so appropriate for it. Kane "mentioned the idea to Clive on the phone, who really liked it. He still owns the fiction rights to the original novella and the mythology created in The Hellbound Heart, just not the movie rights, so we came up with the notion of doing an anthology based in that world. He even said he'd do an original painting for the cover, which was brilliant of him".

== Reception ==
The collection received a negative review from Publishers Weekly. HorrorNews.net's Adrian Halen praised it for not having a short story approach with endings but instead deeper looks into those who summon the Cenobites. David McWilliam of Strange Horizons enjoyed the book, expressing that "despite the occasional misstep, Hellbound Hearts serves as a testament to the visceral, otherworldly impact of the scarified, magisterial Cenobites and the seductive mystery of the puzzle box that summons them, which are used as archetypes robust enough to withstand extensive reconfiguration and reimagining. For the most part, these stories breathe new life into a well-worn franchise and serve to flesh out an as-yet barely explored mythology".

== Legacy ==
Kane has stated that working on the collection inspired him to write his own Hellraiser book, which ended up being Sherlock Holmes and the Servants of Hell, a Sherlock Holmes pastiche.
