= Rheagan Wallace =

American actress

- Born: Courtney Rheagan Wallace
- Occupation: Actress
- Years active: 1996–present

Courtney Rheagan Wallace is an American actress who had a brief recurring role as Georgia Huffington on the television series 7th Heaven. Her other television credits include Agents of S.H.I.E.L.D., Devious Maids, CSI: Crime Scene Investigation, ER, That's So Raven, Malcolm in the Middle, NYPD Blue, Judging Amy and Walker, Texas Ranger, among other series.

Wallace played a role as a child in the game Harvester.

In 2011, Rheagan played Deede Wallrath, the daughter of Texas agricultural tycoon Richard "Dick" Wallrath (portrayed by Jon Gries) in the film Deep in the Heart (which premiered at the Austin Film Festival on October 23, 2011).

Her most recent performance, the tenth installment of the Hellraiser franchise, in the 2018 Hellraiser: Judgment. Rheagan plays Alison Carter, the wife of Detective Sean Carter.

== Filmography ==
Film and television
Year	Title	Role	Notes
1996–1998	Walker, Texas Ranger	Leslie Kidwell/Kelly Sanderson	TV series, 2 episodes
1998	Six-String Samurai	Peggy Cleaver	Theatrical film
1999	Dill Scallion	Susie Sue	Direct-to-video film (scene deleleted)
2000	Judging Amy	Julie Lux	TV series, 1 episode
2001	Boston Public	Jessica Pavin	TV series, 1 episode
2002	America's Most Terrible Things	Emma Potts	Made-for-TV film
2002	Philly	Amy Harper	TV series, 1 episode
2002	My Wife and Kids	Kathy	TV series, 1 episode
2002	Adaptation.	Kim Canetti	Theatrical film
2003	NYPD Blue	Allison Ackerman	TV series, 2 episodes
2002–2006	Malcolm in the Middle	Jackie/Raduca	TV series, 3 episodes
2004	ER	Layla Dering	TV series, 1 episode
2004	Suburban Madness	Amy Harris	Made-for-TV film
2004	7th Heaven	Georgia Huffington	TV series, 5 episodes
2005	That's So Raven	Jennifer	TV series, 1 episode
2006	CSI: Crime Scene Investigation	Mindy Faberge	TV series, 1 episode
2008	Extreme Movie	Jessica	Theatrical film
2010	Truth be Told	Shannon Carter	Short film
2011	Humans Versus Zombies	Cindy	Theatrical film
2012	Deep in the Heart	Deede	Theatrical film
2013	From Above	NY Blonde	Theatricial film
2013	Charlie: A Toy Story	Faith	Theatricial film
2014	Amazin' Grace	Grace	Short film
2014	Devious Maids	Actress - "Jimmy"	Episode: "You Can't Take It With You"
2014	Blue Family	Julia	Theatrical film
2014	Respite	Liz	Short film
2015	With or Without	Ashley	Short film
2016	Love Is A Battlefield	Camilla	Short film
2017	The Summoning	Anna	Theatrical film
2017	Agents of S.H.I.E.L.D.	Marilyn	Episode: "Farewell, Cruel World!"
2018	Hellraiser: Judgement	Alison Carter	Theatrical film
2018	A.P. Bio	Nice Woman #1	Episode: "Dating Toledoans"
2018	Forever	Jen	Episode: "June"
