= Hellraiser: Judgment =

2018 horror film

- Home media release artwork
- Directed by: Gary J. Tunnicliffe
- Written by: Gary J. Tunnicliffe
- Based on: Characters by Clive Barker
- Produced by: Michael Leahy
- Starring: Damon Carney; Randy Wayne; Alexandra Harris; Heather Langenkamp; Paul T. Taylor
- Cinematography: Samuel Calvin
- Edited by: Mike Leahy; Michael Griffin (Note: Credited in the official billing of the home media release.)
- Music by: Deron Johnson
- Production company: Dimension Films
- Distributed by: Lionsgate Home Entertainment
- Release date: February 13, 2018
- Running time: 81 minutes
- Country: United States
- Language: English
- Budget: $350,000 (Note: As stated by writer/director Gary J. Tunnicliffe. No source from Dimension Films is listed confirming an estimated budget.)
- Box office: $426,290

Hellraiser: Judgment is a 2018 American horror film written and directed by Gary J. Tunnicliffe, based on the characters created by Clive Barker. The tenth installment in the Hellraiser film series, the film stars Damon Carney, Randy Wayne, Alexandra Harris, Heather Langenkamp, and Paul T. Taylor, and centers on three police detectives who, investigating a series of murders, are confronted by the denizens of hell. The film expands the fictional universe by introducing a new faction of hell: the Stygian Inquisition. While the Cenobites offer sadomasochistic pleasures to humans that enter their dominion, the Inquisition processes the souls of sinners. Tunnicliffe plays the Inquisition's auditor, a prominent role in the film.

Unable to direct his screenplay for Hellraiser: Revelations (2011) due to a scheduling conflict, Tunnicliffe initially removed all references to the series from his Judgment concept and tried to have it funded as an independent film in 2013. He intended on making a "true" Hellraiser film because of his disappointment with the later films. Several years later, Dimension Films was required to make another Hellraiser film to retain the rights, giving Tunnicliffe a chance to propose his vision. The concept was initially rejected but accepted after he negotiated changes with the studio executives. It was filmed in Oklahoma with Children of the Corn: Runaway, both films produced by Michael Leahy. It is the second Hellraiser film without Doug Bradley as Pinhead; newcomer Taylor was cast after impressing Tunnicliffe in an audition. He and Tunnicliffe decided to develop a new look and interpretation, rather than imitating Bradley's performance.

Judgment was scheduled for release in 2017 with minimal marketing to avoid negative publicity, but was temporarily shelved. According to Taylor, its release was not a priority for Dimension until the sexual abuse allegations involving parent company co-founder Harvey Weinstein (when the film was put back into post production). It was distributed by Lionsgate Films in video on demand and home media on February 13, 2018. Although critics compared the film favorably to its predecessors, its low budget and police procedural aspects were criticized.

== Plot ==
In Hell, Pinhead from the Cenobite sect, and the Auditor of the Stygian Inquisition are discussing how to adapt their methods of harvesting souls in the face of advancing human technology that is making the Configurations—gateways to Hell—obsolete. Meanwhile on Earth, three detectives—brothers Sean and David Carter, and Christine Egerton—investigate a serial killer known as the Preceptor, whose murders are based on the Ten Commandments.

A connection with one of the victims leads the detectives to Karl Watkins, a local criminal who went missing near an abandoned house. Sean goes there and loses consciousness, waking up in the Stygian Inquisition's domain in Hell. As the Inquisition prepares to hand down a verdict on Sean for his sins, the angel Jophiel intervenes and tells them to release him. Sean escapes the realm with a stolen puzzle box, and the Auditor requests Pinhead's guidance on the matter. Sean and David return to search the house, finding no trace of Hell or the Inquisition. That night he is haunted by visions of the Cenobites and Hell's denizens, who promise "judgment and redemption" to anyone who opens the box.

Sean and Christine go to the coroner Hodges' office and find that a cell phone of one of the Preceptor's victims was stored in her body, recording her final location with its GPS. They find the Preceptor's hideout, where Sean incapacitates Christine and reveals himself as the killer. David deduces the Preceptor's identity and meets with Hodges to find the building. Upon arrival, Sean disarms David and reveals that he is holding his wife Alison hostage, outraged that she had an affair. He forces David and Alison to open the box at gunpoint, summoning the Cenobites and opening a gateway to their realm.

Aware that someone from Hell would come to collect his soul after his initial escape, Sean attempts to offer Alison and David to Pinhead. Pinhead tells him they will be dealt with for opening the box, but because a separate faction of Hell wanted his soul, no deal will be made. The Auditor appears, telling Sean the Inquisition has found him guilty of his sins. Jophiel intervenes again and protests to Pinhead and the Auditor that Sean is part of Heaven's plan to instill fear into sinners. Pinhead arranges for Christine to kill Sean, and spitefully dispatches Jophiel. As punishment, God banishes Pinhead to Earth, tormented by the want of suffering. In a post-credits scene, a group of Mormon missionaries in Germany approach a house and are answered by The Auditor.

== Cast and characters ==
- Damon Carney as Detective Sean Carter / The Preceptor:
  A police detective and Iraq War veteran who investigates a string of murders and discovers an other-worldly threat. Unbeknownst to his colleagues, he murders people who violate the Ten Commandments.
- Randy Wayne as Detective David Carter:
  Sean's partner during the investigation. Wayne initially questioned some of Tunnicliffe's decisions; according to the director, defending a character to the actor was not a problem for him: "I think Randy wants to trust the Director and you have to earn that by showing respect for the process. Once that trust was established, Randy relaxed and found David".
- Alexandra Harris as Detective Christine Egerton:
  A detective who assists Sean and David in the murder investigation. Although Christine did not appear in the original story, the studio suggested her as a foil to Sean and David.
- Heather Langenkamp as the Landlady:
  Langenkamp, known for her role as Nancy Thompson in A Nightmare on Elm Street (1984), plays an obscene, cigarette-smoking landlady in Judgment. Casting director Chris Freihofer, who was acquainted with Langenkamp, showed her the screenplay before suggesting her to Tunnicliffe. He was pleased that Langenkamp agreed to take part in the film, since she is regularly offered horror-film roles.
- Paul T. Taylor as Pinhead:
  The leader of the Cenobites, a religious faction of mutilated humans in Hell who belong to the Order of the Gash and offer those who solve the Lament Configuration sadomasochistic pleasures. His face is marked with cuts arranged in a grid, with nails inserted into the intersections of creased flesh. Taylor made his debut as the priest of Hell, who was played by Doug Bradley in the first eight films and Stephen Smith Collins in Hellraiser: Revelations. According to Taylor, in Pinhead's Judgment character arc events directly affect him (unlike the more recent sequels, with "him just showing up and doing his job"). Tunnicliffe was inspired by Hellbound: Hellraiser II (1988) in crafting Pinhead's fate in Judgment's climax: "I got to a point where I was writing the end of the film, and I thought, 'Well, he came from being immortal. We saw him birthed in Hellbound,' which I really loved, and I thought, 'If you're the king, then the very worst thing that can happen to you is you get stripped and thrown out with the paupers'". The filmmaker said that if he had had the budget, Pinhead would have been shown getting stripped of his pins and his clothing shredded. He suggested an ending in which a naked, now-human Pinhead is found on a rainy night bleeding in a gutter by a policeman, with the grid still in his face.
- Gary J. Tunnicliffe as the Auditor:
  A clerk in Hell who notes a person's sin before sending the person to the Assessor for judgment. The Auditor's typewriter paper is made of flesh and inked in blood; he often carries a music box that plays "Für Elise" as a comforting remnant of his human past. According to Tunnicliffe, the character is German. Not a Cenobite, he is part of the Stygian Inquisition separate from the Order of the Gash (one of Hell's many orders). There are many auditors in the Inquisition; Tunnicliffe's character shares the faction with the Assessor, the Jury, the Butcher and the Surgeon. Other members (the Bone Collectors, the Seamstress, the Sentinels, the Order of Exudation, and the Effluviam) were planned for introduction but removed for budgetary reasons. The character was influenced by Sam Lowry from Brazil (1985) and Itzhak Stern from Schindler's List (1993). The Stygian Inquisition lures their victims (candidates) to houses on earth that connect to Hell, evaluating their sins and desires to decide their fate. Occasionally, its victims are deemed more suited to the Cenobites. Time and budget contributed to Tunnicliffe playing the character, allowing him to come in before shooting to apply the make-up; prosthetics could be applied in advance, and a body double could be used as needed. He accepted acting advice from a number of sources (including Damon Carney), and Mike Leahy and script supervisor Pepper helped direct his on-screen scenes. Tunnicliffe said: "I've been acting for many years, I love the franchise and I wanted to play the character. I thought in the very worst-case scenario if I suck, then I can dub myself later!"
- John Gulager as the Assessor:
  A gluttonous member of the Stygian Inquisition who processes pages given to him by the Auditor and passes the results to the Jury. Although Tunnicliffe had never seen filmmaker John Gulager act, he knew that Gulager is an actor and wrote the Assessor for him. Gulager previously directed the horror films Feast (2005), Feast II: Sloppy Seconds (2008), Feast III: The Happy Finish (2009), and Piranha 3DD (2012).
- Mike Jay Regan as the Chatterer:
  A Cenobite and follower of the Order of the Gash with facial deformities and continuously-clicking teeth. Succeeding Nicholas Vince in the role, Regan played the Chatterer Torso in Hellraiser: Inferno (2000) and the Chatterer in Hellraiser: Hellseeker (2002), Hellraiser: Deader, and Hellraiser: Hellworld (both 2005).

Grace Montie plays Crystal Lanning, a dog-loving socialite whose murder sets the plot into motion. Rheagan Wallace plays Alison Carter, Sean's wife. Diane Goldner plays a Cleaner, an aging nude woman and part of the Stygian Inquisition who forces her tongue on victims as penance. Tunnicliffe conceived the Cleaners as in their nineties (similar to the three Witches from Macbeth), saying his worst nightmare would be being chained to a bed with old women licking him clean. Andi Powers plays one of the Jury, three nude women in their twenties with skinless faces who hand down verdicts from the Inquisition. Other acting credits include Jeff Fenter as sinner Karl Watkins and Helena Grace Donald as the angel Jophiel. Judgment is the first Hellraiser film to include Heaven in its mythology. According to Tunnicliffe, he took influence from The Scarlet Gospels, stating "I am in no way religious, but if you are writing a story that acknowledges the existence of Hell, then you have to acknowledge the existence of Heaven. I'm a big fan of things like Constantine and Prophecy, so it was fun bringing those characters into it".

== Production ==
=== Development ===
Only took a mere 30 years to get from being a 19 yr old make up fx wannabe living in rural Staffordshire to finally getting to write and direct a Hellraiser movie (whilst creating make up effects for a whole bunch of them along the way).

— Gary J. Tunnicliffe

Decades before the development of Hellraiser: Judgment, Dimension Films obtained the rights to the Hellraiser and Children of the Corn film series; Dimension's first films were Hellraiser III: Hell on Earth and Children of the Corn II: The Final Sacrifice, shot back-to-back in North Carolina in 1991. Since then, the company has been required to produce films in both series to retain the rights. Around the release of Hellraiser: Bloodline in 1996, Gary Tunnicliffe (who was involved with the special effects of Hellraiser III and Bloodline) pitched a Hellraiser story, Holy War, to Dimension executive Bob Weinstein; an opening scene, about a priest seeking a path to Heaven through suffering, was storyboarded. Tunnicliffe continued to provide special effects for the series' sequels through Hellraiser: Hellworld (2005), which all were released to direct-to-video after Bloodline, but was unhappy with the quality of the films. Nearing a later deadline to retain Hellraiser and Children of the Corn, Dimension Films offered him an opportunity to write and direct a Hellraiser sequel. Tunnicliffe wrote the screenplay for 2011's Hellraiser: Revelations, but could not direct it due to a scheduling conflict with Scream 4.

Instead of being an original screenplay converted into a Hellraiser film, Tunnicliffe's idea for Judgment was intended as part of the series from its conception. He removed its Hellraiser elements after trying to meet with Dimension, who were uninterested in making another Hellraiser film immediately after Revelations. Tunnicliffe showed Judgment to Mike Jay Regan, who enjoyed its premise and suggested the removal of Pinhead for a standalone project. He then attempted to make it as an independent film, but failed to find financial backers, leading to an unsuccessful Kickstarter campaign in 2013. Five years after being unable to direct Revelations, Dimension (facing another rights-retention deadline) offered Tunnicliffe the job of writing and directing another Hellraiser film. Tunnicliffe pitched Hellraiser: Judgment to Dimension three times (being rejected each time), and wrote a script treatment for a more traditional Hellraiser film, Enter Darkness, to demonstrate that he could come up with other ideas. The treatment's plot involved psychiatric hospital interns studying patients with shared experiences of the Lament Configuration, while the head doctor collates them to meet the Cenobites himself. The studio approved it, but Tunnicliffe insisted on making Judgment. Dimension told him to write the script for Judgment with the proviso that if they disliked it, he would direct Enter Darkness without being paid. After reading it, they allowed Tunnicliffe to direct Judgment as part of the series after negotiating rewrites, notes, and suggested changes. Saying that Judgment "will have moments unlike any other [film] you have ever seen", he was inspired by the works of Hieronymus Bosch, Francis Bacon, David Cronenberg, David Lynch, David Fincher, and Hellraiser creator Clive Barker.

==== Original story ====
Tunnicliffe's original treatment began with a Christian missionary approaching a rundown house to spread the Gospel and being captured by the Auditor at the door. The film's next fifteen to twenty minutes would focus on the missionary's audit as he is processed (judged) by the Auditor, the Assessor, the Jury, the Surgeon, the Butcher, the Seamstress, and the Bone Collectors. Two days later, a police officer is captured by the Auditor when he searches for the missing missionary. Tunnicliffe wanted the scenes in Hell to be more nightmarish than they were in the finished film. The Assessor chokes on the pages of the policeman's sins during the audit, leading the distraught Auditor to seek assistance from Pinhead. Pinhead gathers the Chatterer and the Female Cenobite to find out what went wrong. Flashbacks show several police investigations, misleading the audience into thinking the police officer is innocent. An angel confronts Pinhead, demanding the police officer's release. The officer leaves the house, returning to raid it with armed colleagues, but find it to be empty. Pinhead and the Auditor review the officer's sins, discover that he is not innocent, and confront the angel. The next day, the officer awakens to the Cenobites invading his home. The audience learns about his sins, and the next fifteen minutes of the film would involve the Cenobites capturing and tormenting him.

=== Casting ===
Judgment was cast by a team led by casting director Chris Freihofer. Gary Tunnicliffe wanted Doug Bradley to reprise his role as Pinhead, the lead Cenobite; Bradley refused, criticizing Dimension Films for the quality of the Hellraiser sequels. Tunnicliffe pleaded with him, but Bradley again declined when he learned that he would have to sign a non-disclosure agreement to obtain the screenplay. In an interview with Bloody-Disgusting, Bradley said he had not read the script and declined to comment on the film's quality, but he expressed chagrin that it was another rights-retention project. Paul T. Taylor was cast as Pinhead, and Tunnicliffe played the Auditor. Mike Jay Regan reprised his role as the Chatterer, and Heather Langenkamp would play a character in the film.

Taylor became involved when he received an email inviting him to screen test as the Auditor; after the test, he was asked to audition as Pinhead. The latter audition took place in Los Angeles, where Taylor thought he "nailed" his performance. Tunnicliffe allowed him to interpret the character, and he was given months to prepare before filming began. The preparation included smoking (unusual for Taylor), to give his voice a gravelly quality. He took late-night walks in high-crime neighborhoods near his home, which he described as "facing the fear". He said of his performance: "I have a vulnerability in my acting no matter what I do. It's just there ... It's about the stillness. [Pinhead]'s already so terrifying that when he makes a move, it means something. He's very economical and when he speaks, he's so eloquent". Believing "Pinhead has to be British", the American actor used a British accent when in-character. For research, he visited a comic-book store to read Hellraiser comic books in which Pinhead appeared. Tunnicliffe detailed his reasons for selecting Taylor, saying he was prepared and open to listening, but also wanting to give his own interpretation: "I wanted a slightly different Pinhead for this new tale, there's a stillness, a dry resolve to this new version, coldness, sarcasm. I wanted a Pinhead with a regal sense of arrogance and boredom and Paul delivered".

=== Filming and editing ===
The filmmakers used color to distinguish the domains of hell inhabited by the Cenobites (top) and the Stygian Inquisition. The images show Pinhead and the Auditor, respectively.

Filming took place over a three-week period in Oklahoma, on a relatively small budget of $350,000. Tunnicliffe and cinematographer Samuel Calvin prepared substantially beforehand to maximize shooting time, using a daily average of 30 to 35 complex camera and lighting set-ups. According to Tunnicliffe, all departments were enthusiastic about their work and a work day never exceeded thirteen hours. Filming locations included a derelict building, a bar, a luxury apartment building and penthouse suite, a church interior, a children's playground, alleys, and stages and sets built by the film's art department. Some actors had to be persuaded to arrive at certain shoots, partially because of the film's budget. Tunnicliffe said about filming: "I'm a great believer in really using the time on set. You only get up to twelve to thirteen hours a day, maximum, and I don't like going over time and over budget. I like to have a strong plan going in and the way I do that is that I act out the entire script with my D.P. [director of photography], we act out everybody's roles in every scene. We pick our angles based on that". Local residents contributed to the shoot by suggesting specific locations, and a car dealership loaned a van for the film. Taylor shot his scenes in an Oklahoma City studio, where a set for the "offices of hell" was built. The film was shot at the same time and place as Children of the Corn: Runaway, also produced by Mike Leahy; Judgment actor John Gulager directed Runaway. According to Leahy, "blood has been flowing here in Oklahoma City. These are two horror films that are going to be seen by a core audience". Another three weeks were devoted to editing, and the film's limited budget restricted the number of lengthy edits. This was followed by the implementation of color timing, sound, and music. The score was composed by Deron Johnson, who was influenced by Trent Reznor and the score of Seven. Although Tunnicliffe's original cut had cues from Christopher Young's orchestral soundtrack from Hellraiser and Hellbound, a more modern approach was adopted for budgetary reasons. The domains of hell inhabited by the Cenobites and the Stygian Inquisition were distinguished by color, with a blue palette used for the Cenobites' domain and a "piss" yellow applied to the Inquisition's.

Some of the film's sexual content and violence was deemed too extreme by the studio, and was removed. Tunnicliffe said: "I don't think people could stomach my original version. The studio certainly couldn't. I could have easily made the film ten to fifteen minutes longer with a more intense cut, but it would probably be TOO much. In the end, wiser heads prevailed". Among Judgment's deleted content were a longer scene of Karl Watkins (Jeff Fenter) being skinned to death by the Inquisition's surgeon (Jilly Blundell), and scenes involving the Cleaners. The original version of the sex scene between Sean (Damon Carney) and Alison Carter (Rheagan Wallace) was more intense, with the camera cutting back and forth between Sean's view of Alison and visions of the Cenobites. Several false endings were conceived for the scene, including Sean's hallucination of Alison fellating him when he looks up after his orgasm to see David Carter (Randy Wayne) smiling back at him. The nightmare scene in which Sean enters an alley and sees flashes of hell was originally longer and more graphic; at one point, he stumbles across Alison as part of a threesome behind a dumpster with two strange men in pig masks. Tunnicliffe wanted to use surreal imagery to convey that "Sean's world was being torn apart, undone by his experiences at the house within the hellish dimension". In Judgment's original concept pitch, the Jury eats the Assessor (Gulager)'s regurgitated pages (not sifting through them) before handing down its verdict on the Stygian Inquisition's captives.

=== Special effects ===
Pinhead's chaotic facial cuts from Gary J. Tunnicliffe's design for the cancelled Hellraiser reboot were repurposed for the Auditor.

The makeup-effects team was led by Mike Regan and Mike Measimer. Taylor's portrayal of Pinhead was intended to be leaner and more serious than previous incarnations, lacking the earlier films' glib one-liners. This was incorporated into the makeup and costume design, with longer silver pins, deeper blade-slice cuts, solid black eyes and a more-visceral, sleeker wardrobe. The character's original attire was replaced with a ragged robe and butcher's skirt made of chain mail. His many tools and weapons were replaced by a streamlined skinning utensil. Some grid-like cuts were rearranged from his previous design, with one square removed from each side of his jaw and one added to the back of his head. The flesh exposed on his chest was made a rhombus in honor of Leviathan, the god worshiped by the Cenobites; a homage to the Eye of Agamotto symbolism from Doctor Strange lore was integrated into the costume. The Lament Configuration was also altered, built with bleached wood and copper etching. The self-inflicted lacerations on the Auditor's face were intended to be less patterned and more chaotic than that of the more-ordered Cenobites. The facial cuts' positions were borrowed from an unsolicited redesign for Pinhead created by Tunnicliffe for Pascal Laugier's cancelled Hellraiser remake. A blood-stained shirt and threadbare two-piece suit cover the cuts on the Auditor's body. Religious symbols, implicitly torn from the necks of the guilty, are on the bracelet of his right wrist. His black spectacles convey the impression of soulless eyes.

Tunnicliffe had to balance directing the film and overseeing the effects work. About the quality of the blood effects, he said: "I don't think it's so much the quantity of blood but more the nature of the effects, the content and the context. I think some of our blood gags are actually quite beautiful; when you see blood raining down on a naked girl with a skinned face at 300 frames per second you can't help but be mesmerized by the fluid dynamics". Taylor compared the simulated gore to that of the Saw series: "I think people are going to be fascinated with it and the things that are, what I would say, on the border of horror porn, there's some elements of that in it and that will please many Hellraiser fans and fans of just what contemporary horror can be these days where it's just a gross-out". He later clarified: "I think [the gore in the film] is done because of the style and aesthetics in a beautiful way. This is not masturbation, and let's just throw blood at the screen".

Tunnicliffe sent pictures to the wardrobe department of what he wanted the characters to wear, and the department measured the actors. Costumes designed and built for the Cenobites were handled by Tunnicliffe's department. He chose to have certain characters nude because he thought it would look visually more interesting than designing cheap costumes. The costume department used a cast of Taylor's head to design a pin mask for him to wear as Pinhead, which covered his entire head except for his ears. Although he found the costume and makeup extremely uncomfortable, he integrated the discomfort into his performance as the sadomasochist. When he saw his reflection in the mirror in the Pinhead makeup, he said he instantly fell into the character's mindset. Taylor thought the makeup menacing enough that he had a minimalist approach to his performance, feeling that attempting to be conventionally frightening would be overacting.

== Release and marketing ==
Hellraiser: Judgment was initially scheduled for a 2017 release. In his interview with Dread Central, Tunnicliffe stated that marketing would be kept to a minimum, aside from the promotional images and casting news that had been released: "It seems to me that any images or fodder given out in good faith are kinda twisted around – usually to the negative – so the best response really is the film itself". Harvey Weinstein is said to be too embarrassed in promoting Judgment, thus credited to delaying the film's release.

Taylor gave a possible explanation in October for the delay, saying the film may not have finished post-production: "I have a reliable source who just informed me that Hellraiser: Judgment has been on a shelf for a while, unfinished. But now that Harvey Weinstein is out of the picture, Hellraiser: Judgment has been taken off that shelf and is back in post-production". Taylor expanded on his reasoning in a later interview, stating the film might not have been released if not for the sexual abuse allegations against Weinstein, which financially compromised the studio.

The film's trailer and release date were released on January 9, 2018. After nearly two years of silence from Dimension Films, Lionsgate Films picked up the distribution rights for Hellraiser: Judgment and Children of the Corn: Runaway; the former was released on digital and home media platforms on February 13. In the United States and Canada, the film made a total of US$426,290 in home media sales: US$83,599 on DVD and US$343,029 on Blu-ray.

== Critical response ==
The film was favorably compared to the franchise's earlier sequels, with Brad Miska of Bloody Disgusting calling it "the most authentic Hellraiser since Bloodline." Collider's Haleigh Foutch praised its attempt to expand the Hellraiser universe, but found the execution sloppy due to a low budget and "pedestrian" human drama. Forbes critic Luke Y. Thompson wrote that it integrated the Earth and Hell scenes more effectively than previous sequels and praised the additional mythology as "the best attempt since the early, more [Clive] Barker-infused theatrical films to deliver a coherent cosmology." However, he criticized the suggested retail price of the release, recommending it only for Hellraiser fans. Although Miska found Judgment "sluggish", he noted the narrative served its purpose as a lead-in to the finale: "Everything comes full circle in the final moments, adding an entirely new dimension to the Hellraiser franchise," yet the film is "solely for Hellraiser apologists."

Some critics deemed it the worst of the franchise, with The Irish Times' Tara Brady becoming pessimistic over the franchise's future, and Scott Weinberg of Thrillist giving up on it entirely, also noting that its reputation has decayed anyway, leaving Judgment with few potential buyers. Critical reviews mainly decried bland acting and storyline. Birth.Movies.Death's Scott Wampler was also disappointed by the lack of screentime for Pinhead, though he anticipated a future Tunnicliffe film "with a decent budget, or less meddling from the rights holders." Andrew Gaudion of FilmHounds additionally called it a boring copy of the 1995 thriller Seven and "half baked when it comes to constructing its central gimmick." He, and We Got This Covered's Matt Donato, found the police procedural elements generic and cliched, with the latter opining that the gore and Hell elements are inadequate; he called the film "one of the least realized, most throwaway" of the series.

The film's special effects and surreal imagery received mixed reviews. Foutch and Gaudion enjoyed them, while The Guardian's Felperin said the effects looked fake, though he praised the production design. The imagery was also criticized by Weinberg. Although IGN's William Bibbiani called the pacing "brisk," he deemed the story a faded carbon copy of other, better serial killer thrillers, and felt the new additions to the Hellraiser mythology robbed the Cenobites of their deviant allure and otherworldly menace. Wampler criticized the acting, story, and lack of screentime for Pinhead, calling the film a "mixed bag with the stuff I enjoyed ultimately outweighed by the stuff I did not." Steve Barton of Dread Central disagreed, stating that the acting and story are surprisingly good: "Pinhead is omnipresent, and Taylor delivers a worthy performance and is every bit as majestic as you'd hope he'd be."

== Future ==
Judgment expands on lore introduced in the earliest films, with Taylor calling it a jumping-off point for a sequel that tells a "true" Hellraiser script with an ambiguous ending. He said the characters in the film could be used in future installments and expressed an interest in returning as Pinhead, but stated he would also be content with a bigger-budgeted reboot starring Doug Bradley. Tunnicliffe had no particular idea for a sequel, spin-off, or follow-up of any kind when developing the film, but has since suggested a scenario where the Auditor helps Pinhead reclaim his status to overthrow an incompetent successor; a "battle of the Hell priests".

In May 2019, Spyglass Media Group began to develop a reboot of the series, with David S. Goyer serving as a writer and producer alongside Gary Barber, who described the project as an "evolved" reimagining of the original film. In April 2020, writing team Ben Collins and Luke Piotrowski came on to write, with David Bruckner attached to direct. The film, Hellraiser, released in October 2022 on Hulu, with Jamie Clayton taking over the role of Pinhead.

In April 2020, HBO finalized a deal with David Gordon Green to direct a Hellraiser television series, penned by Mark Verheiden and Michael Dougherty. The rights to the Stygian Inquisition remain with Tunnicliffe, who has expressed an interest in doing a novel or short story involving the Auditor or the Order of the Effluvium.

Bradley is open to returning to the Pinhead role, but only with the "right place, right time, right motives, right script ... Since I turned down both movies, I knew other actors would get to play the part. I don't know about 'taking over': enjoying temporary ownership, maybe". He was interested in starring in a film version of the Hellraiser novel The Scarlet Gospels, but is unaware of any plans for such a film.
