= Hellraiser (franchise) =

Horror media franchise

- Official franchise logo
- Based on: The Hellbound Heart by Clive Barker
- Starring: Doug Bradley; Various (See list below)
- Distributed by: Entertainment Film Distributors (1); New World Pictures (2); Miramax Films (3–8); Dimension Extreme (9); Lionsgate Films (10); Disney Platform Distribution (Hulu) (11); Paramount Pictures (international) (11)
- Countries: United Kingdom (1–2); United States (3–11)
- Language: English

Hellraiser is a British-American horror media franchise that consists of eleven films, as well as various comic books, and additional merchandise and media. Based on the novella The Hellbound Heart by English author Clive Barker, the franchise centers around the Cenobites which includes the primary antagonist nicknamed Pinhead.

The overall plot of the franchise focuses on a puzzle box, the Lament Configuration. It opens a gateway to the Hell-like realm of the Cenobite lifeforms. The Cenobites are an order of former humans who have become monsters who harvest human souls to torture in their sadistic experiments.

Barker created the franchise and served as writer/director of the original film. He has stated that he signed away the story and character rights to the production company prior to the release of the first film, not realizing the critical and financial success it would be. The franchise was rebooted with an eleventh film, which was released on Hulu in 2022, as well as a television series continuation in development at HBO.

== Films ==
Film	U.S. release date	Director	Screenwriter(s)	Producer(s)	Box office
Hellraiser	September 18, 1987	Clive Barker	Clive Barker	Christopher Figg	$14,564,027
Hellbound: Hellraiser II	December 23, 1988	Tony Randel	Peter Atkins	Christopher Figg and David Barron	$12,090,735
Hellraiser III: Hell on Earth	September 11, 1992	Anthony Hickox	Peter Atkins	Lawrence Mortorff	$12,534,961
Hellraiser: Bloodline	March 8, 1996	Kevin Yagher (credited as Alan Smithee)	Peter Atkins	Nancy Rae Stone	$9,336,886
Hellraiser: Inferno	October 3, 2000	Scott Derrickson	Paul Harris Boardman & Scott Derrickson	W. K. Border and Joel Soisson	N/A
Hellraiser: Hellseeker	October 15, 2002	Rick Bota	Carl V. Dupré & Tim Day	Michael Leahy and Ron Schmidt	N/A
Hellraiser: Deader	June 7, 2005	Rick Bota	Neal Marshall Stevens & Tim Day	David Greathouse and Ron Schmidt	N/A
Hellraiser: Hellworld	September 6, 2005	Rick Bota	Carl V. Dupré	Ron Schmidt	N/A
Hellraiser: Revelations	March 18, 2011	Victor Garcia	Gary J. Tunnicliffe	Aaron Ockman and Joel Soisson	N/A
Hellraiser: Judgment	February 13, 2018	Gary J. Tunnicliffe	Gary J. Tunnicliffe	Michael Leahy	N/A
Hellraiser	October 7, 2022	David Bruckner	Ben Collins & Luke Piotrowski	David S. Goyer, Keith Levine, Clive Barker, and Marc Toberoff	$12,640 (Note: The film was not released theatrically in the United States; it grossed $12,640 from a limited theatrical release in the UK.)

=== Hellraiser (1987) ===
Frank Cotton (Sean Chapman) escapes from the Cenobites when his brother Larry (Andrew Robinson) spills his own blood on the spot where Frank died after opening the puzzle box that opened a gateway to the Cenobites. With the help of Larry's wife Julia (Clare Higgins), Frank begins regenerating his body with the blood of victims that Julia supplies him. Larry's daughter, Kirsty (Ashley Laurence), accidentally unleashes the Cenobites, but makes a deal to deliver Frank to them in exchange for her own life. After taking Frank's soul, the Cenobites still try to take Kirsty's soul as well, but solving the puzzle box, Kirsty sends the Cenobites back to Hell.

=== Hellbound: Hellraiser II (1988) ===
Dr. Philip Channard (Kenneth Cranham) resurrects Julia, who was stuck in Hell with the Cenobites. Kirsty is pulled back into the Cenobite world, where the demons decide to keep her, but, having discovered the human identity of the Cenobites earlier, Kirsty appeals to their latent humanity, specifically the Cenobite leader Pinhead (Doug Bradley). Pinhead decides to release her, but he and his followers are killed by Channard, who has become a Cenobite himself. With the help of a teenage girl, Tiffany (Imogen Boorman), who unknowingly assisted Channard in opening the box, Kirsty and Tiffany escape the Cenobite world and close the gateway behind them.

=== Hellraiser III: Hell on Earth (1992) ===
The revelation of Pinhead's humanity has resulted in a schism, splitting him into two separate parts: his human self, World War I veteran Elliot Spencer, and Pinhead, now a living embodiment of Spencer's id. While Spencer is trapped in limbo, Pinhead is trapped, along with the puzzle box, in the surface of an intricately carved pillar, a relic of the Cenobite realm. The pillar is purchased by a night club owner, J.P. Monroe (Kevin Bernhardt), who begins assisting Pinhead in his resurrection. A television reporter, Joey Summerskill (Terry Farrell), begins to learn about Pinhead and the puzzle box, which leads her to Monroe's night club. Pinhead is eventually resurrected, and begins creating new Cenobite followers in an effort to establish Hell on Earth. Joey manages to reunite Spencer and Pinhead, fusing them back into one entity, and is able to use the puzzle box to send Pinhead back to his dimension. Afterward, Joey submerges the box into freshly laid cement at a construction site.

=== Hellraiser: Bloodline (1996) ===
A toymaker named Philip Lemarchand (Bruce Ramsay) is commissioned by the Duc de L'Isle (Mickey Cottrell), a wealthy Aristocrat and master of the dark arts, to create the box as a gateway to Hell so that de L'Isle can enslave a demon. Beginning in the distant future, and tracing the history of the box from its creation in 1796, Bloodline shows how the Lemarchand family attempts to close the box forever after learning what L'Isle uses it for. Eventually, Dr. Paul Merchant creates the Elysium Configuration, a space station capable of closing the gateway for good, and he traps Pinhead inside and destroys him and the box.

Bloodline was the final Hellraiser film to receive a theatrical release, though it was released direct-to-video in the UK.

=== Hellraiser: Inferno (2000) ===
Corrupt police Detective Joseph Thorne (Craig Sheffer) discovers the puzzle box while investigating a series of ritualistic murders. As time goes on he begins to uncover clues that suggest that he is the killer. Eventually, Pinhead appears and informs Thorne that the events of the movie have been transpiring in Thorne's own personal Hell, and that he will be reliving the same series of events for eternity.

=== Hellraiser: Hellseeker (2002) ===
Kirsty Cotton and her husband, Trevor (Dean Winters), end up in a car accident that kills her. One month later, Trevor wakes up in a hospital, but because of a head injury, his memory is uncertain and he cannot distinguish between fantasy and reality. As he begins to uncover evidence that he was having a series of affairs, he also comes under suspicion for orchestrating the crash that killed his wife. Pinhead appears in the end, and informs Trevor that he was the one that died in the car crash, his own plot to murder Kirsty for her inheritance having backfired when Kirsty offered the Cenobites the lives of Trevor, his mistresses, and his co-conspirators in exchange for her own.

=== Hellraiser: Deader (2005) ===
Reporter Amy Klein (Kari Wuhrer), is sent to Bucharest to investigate an underground suicide cult founded by a descendant of Philip Lemarchand, who claims to be able to bring back the dead and who believes that it is his birthright to open the puzzle box and control the Cenobites. She is gradually drawn into their world and eventually sees no way out other than to join them. In the end she opens the puzzle box, summoning up Pinhead and the Cenobites, who kill everyone for attempting to invade their world. To prevent Pinhead from taking her soul, Amy kills herself.

=== Hellraiser: Hellworld (2005) ===
Taking place in the "real-life world", in which the Hellraiser franchise has spawned a successful MMORPG. Five friends mourning the death of one of their fellow players—who kills himself after becoming obsessed with the game—receive in-game invitations to a party at the Leviathan House. At the house, the host of the party (Lance Henriksen) takes them on a tour of the many layers of the home, after which they are picked off one-by-one by the host or Pinhead. The final two victims ultimately realize that most of the events of the movie have been a hallucination, after the host—the father of their deceased friend, who blames his son's fellow players for not breaking his addiction to the game—drugged them and buried them alive. The police rescue the surviving teenagers, Chelsea (Katheryn Winnick) and Jake (Christopher Jacot), while the host escapes to a decrepit motel with a suitcase of his son's belongings. The host discovers a real puzzle box inside, and upon opening it is killed by Pinhead and a pair of Cenobites.

=== Hellraiser: Revelations (2011) ===
The ninth film in the franchise, Revelations is the first film not to feature Doug Bradley as Pinhead and was shot in two weeks for $300,000. In 2011, it was released to a single theater in California for a crew showing that was ostensibly open to the public. It was suggested by Bloody Disgusting that the film was only shot so that The Weinstein Company would not lose its filming rights before it could produce a remake of the original. The film was released in DVD format on October 18, 2011.

=== Hellraiser: Judgment (2018) ===
The tenth film in the franchise, it began filming in early 2016. Like Revelations, it does not feature Doug Bradley as Pinhead. Bradley was offered the part but turned it down because the production company refused to let him read the script without signing a non-disclosure agreement regarding its contents. This film was released in DVD format on February 13, 2018.

=== Hellraiser (2022) ===
In October 2006, Clive Barker announced on his official website that he would be writing the script for a forthcoming remake of the original Hellraiser film, which was to be produced by Dimension Films. Pascal Laugier was hired as director, before ultimately dropping out of the production due to creative differences. Laugier reportedly wanted the film to have a dark and serious tone, while producers wanted the target audience to be teenagers.

In October 2010, Patrick Lussier was hired to serve as director on a reboot of the Hellraiser franchise, with a script written by Todd Farmer. The film's story would have differed from the original film, as the creative team did not want to retell the same story. The story was intended to center on the world, and functions of the puzzle box. By 2011 however, the pair had dropped out of the project. In October 2013, Clive Barker was once again attached to the next Hellraiser film. Barker was hired to serve as writer/director, while Doug Bradley was announced to reprise his role as Pinhead. By 2014, Barker stated that he had completed a second draft for the script, stating that he may not serve as director on the project. The story was described as a "very loose" remake of the original film. In March 2017, the filmmaker stated that the "script was written and delivered to Dimension years ago". He acknowledged that the franchise is now looking at adapting a sequel, instead.

Inspired by the success of the Halloween (2018) from Universal Pictures, Miramax Films announced plans to adapt future installments in the Hellraiser franchise. In May 2019, Gary Barber stated that Spyglass Media Group will develop the next film in the franchise, described as a reboot. David S. Goyer was announced to serve as writer and producer. By April 2020, David Bruckner was hired as director, from a script he co-wrote with Ben Collins and Luke Piotrowski. Later in October, Jamie Clayton was cast as Pinhead. The film was released as a Hulu Original Film, exclusively via streaming on Hulu on October 7, 2022.

== Television ==
In 2020, a television series adaptation of the franchise was announced to be in development. Mark Verheiden and Michael Dougherty will serve as the main writers, while David Gordon Green will direct several of the episodes. The series will be "an elevated continuation and expansion" of the film series. Verheiden, Dougherty, and Green will serve as executive producers, alongside Danny McBride, Jody Hill, Brandon James, and Roy Lee. The project will be a joint-venture production between HBO, Rough House Pictures and Vertigo Entertainment. Later in October, Clive Barker joined the series as an executive producer. The series has not yet been produced, as of 2026.

== Literature ==
=== Follow-up works by Clive Barker ===
The Scarlet Gospels, a novel-length sequel to The Hellbound Heart also featuring Barker's recurring Harry D'Amour character, was released in 2015. Hellraiser: The Toll, set before The Scarlet Gospels and after The Hellbound Heart, was written by Mark Alan Miller, from a story by Clive Barker, and was published by Subterranean Press in February 2018.

=== Works by other writers ===
Hellbound Hearts, an anthology coedited by Paul Kane and Marie O'Regan was released on 29 September 2009. It had a cover painted by Barker and included a reprint of "Wordsworth", a short comic by Neil Gaiman and Dave McKean originally printed in Epic Comics' Hellraiser comic book. Paul Kane alone authored Sherlock Holmes and the Servants of Hell, a 2016 crossover with Sir Arthur Conan Doyle's Sherlock Holmes.

=== Comics ===
==== Epic Comics ====
Epic Comics, a more adult imprint of Marvel Comics, began publishing series of comic book spin-offs for the Hellraiser franchise in a prestige format. Epic's title, entitled simply Hellraiser, had Clive Barker acting as a consultant for the comics. These included "Wordsworth", written by Neil Gaiman and illustrated by Gaiman's frequent collaborator Dave McKean. Between 1989 and 1992, Epic published twenty regular series comics. They also published three special issues from 1992 to 1994, one being a holiday special, in addition to an adaptation of Hellraiser III: Hell on Earth and a collection of the first two issues. Other releases included the limited series Clive Barker's Book of the Damned and Pinhead, as well as the crossovers Hellraiser vs. Nightbreed: Jihad and Pinhead vs. Marshal Law: Law in Hell. The following series were released by Epic Comics:

Name	Years published	Issues
Hellraiser	1989–1992	#1–20
Clive Barker's Book of the Damned: A Hellraiser Companion	1991–1993	#1–4
Hellraiser vs. Nightbreed: Jihad	1991	#1–2
Epic Book One	1992	#1
Hellraiser (collected book)	1992	#1
Hellraiser III (film adaptation)	1992	#1
Hellraiser: Summer Special	1992	#1
Hellraiser: Holiday Special	1992	#1
Pinhead	1993–1994	#1–6
Pinhead vs. Marshal Law: Law in Hell	1993	#1–2
Clive Barker's The Harrowers	1993–1994	#1–6
Clive Barker's Hellbreed	1994	#1–3
Hellraiser: Spring Slaughter	1994	#1

==== Boom! Studios ====
In March 2011 Boom! Studios commenced a new Hellraiser series, written by Clive Barker and Christopher Monfette. Separately, reprints of selected Epic Comics stories appeared under the title of Hellraiser Masterpieces. After the conclusion of the ongoing series written by Barker, Boom! Studios followed it up with three shorter series by other writers, Hellraiser: The Road Below, Hellraiser: The Dark Watch and Hellraiser: Bestiary.

In June 2026 Boom! Studios announced that a new series of five one-shots titled Hellraiser: Resurrections would be released weekly in September 2026. Amidst the Hellraiser: Resurrections releases in September 2026 it was announced that it would be followed by two new series, Hellraiser: Hellbound Hearts starting in January 2027 and Hellraiser: New Parables starting in April 2027.

Boom! Studios comic series
Name	Writern by	Illustrated by	Years published	Issues
Hellraiser	Clive Barker, Christopher Monfette, Anthony DiBlasi, Robb Humpfreys, Mark Allan Miller	Leonardo Manco, Stephen Tompson, Jesús Hervás, Janusz Ordon, Ibraim Roberson, Marcio Henrique, Giovani Timpano	2011–2012, 2013	#1–20, Annual #1, 2013 Annual #1
Hellraiser: Masterpieces	Reprints of earlier material from Epic Comics		2011	#1–12
Hellraiser: The Road Below	Brandon Seifert	Haemi Jang	2012	#1–4
Hellraiser: The Dark Watch	Clive Barker, Brandon Seifert	Tom Garcia, Korkut Öztekin	2013–2014	12
Hellraiser: Bestiary	Ben Maeres, Mark Allan Miller, Christopher Taylor, Lela Gwenn, Michael Moreci, Christopher Sebela	Conor Nolan, Jason Shawn Alexander, Akiel Guzman, Daniele Serra, Paolo Villanelli, Matt Battaglia	2014–2015	6
Hellraiser: Resurrections	Mike Costa, Zac Thompson, Tini Howard, Nero Villagallos O’Reilly, Sarah Gailey	Paco Camallonga, Gavin Mitchell, Jenna Cha, Francesca Ciregia, Alessio Avallone	2026	5 one-shots
Hellraiser: Hellbound Hearts	Mike Costa	Jan Bazaldua	2027	
Hellraiser: New Parables	Sarah Gailey	Savanna Mayer	2027	

Collected editions
Name	Collected Material	Release date	ISBN
Hellraiser Vol.1 - Pursuit of the Flesh	Hellraiser #1–4	October 2011	ISBN 978-1608863143
Hellraiser Vol.2 - Requiem	Hellraiser #5–8	January 2012	ISBN 978-1608860876
Hellraiser Vol.3 - Heaven's Reply	Hellraiser #9-12	July 2012	ISBN 978-1608860906
Hellraiser Vol. 4 - Hell Hath No Fury	Hellraiser #13–16, Annual #1	November 2012	ISBN 978-1608862832
Hellraiser Vol. 5 - Blood Communion	Hellraiser #17–20	May 2013	ISBN 978-1608863020
Hellraiser: Masterpieces Vol. 1	Hellraiser: Masterpieces #1–6	January 2012	ISBN 978-1608860685
Hellraiser: Masterpieces Vol. 2	Hellraiser: Masterpieces #7–12	September 2012	ISBN 978-1608862740
Hellraiser: The Road Below	Hellraiser: The Road Below #1–4	June 2013	ISBN 978-1608863143
Hellraiser: The Dark Watch Vol. 1	Hellraiser: The Dark Watch #1–4	September 2013	ISBN 978-1608863365
Hellraiser: The Dark Watch Vol. 2	Hellraiser: The Dark Watch #5–8	March 2014	ISBN 978-1608863594
Hellraiser: The Dark Watch Vol. 3	Hellraiser: The Dark Watch #9-12	October 2014	ISBN 978-1608863983
Clive Barker's Hellraiser Omnibus Vol. 1	Clive Barker's Hellraiser #1-20, Annual #1	November 2017	ISBN 978-1684150113
Hellraiser Omnibus Vol. 1	Clive Barker's Hellraiser #1-20, Annual #1	November 2026	ISBN 979-8217383672
Hellraiser Omnibus Vol. 2	Hellraiser: The Road Below #1-4, Hellraiser: The Dark Watch #1-12, Hellraiser 2013 Annual #1, Hellraiser: Bestiary #1-6	March 2027	ISBN 979-8217384839
Hellraiser: Resurrections Vol. 0	Hellraiser: Resurrections - New Wounds #1, Hellraiser: Resurrections - The Organistic Ritual #1, Hellraiser: Resurrections - The Deep Gospel #1, Hellraiser: Resurrections - Hell's Council #1, Hellraiser: Resurrections - The Return of the Priest #1	April 2027	ISBN 979-8217384907

==== Seraphim Inc. ====
Seraphim Incorporated, a graphic novel imprint headed by Clive Barker, began publishing a series of original graphic novels titled Hellraiser: Anthology in 2017. They are collections of stories taking place within the Hellraiser universe hailing from various creators, including Barker himself.

Name	Years published	Issues
Hellraiser: Anthology – Volume 1	2017	1 TPB
Hellraiser: Anthology – Volume 2	2017	1 TPB

=== Non-fiction ===
There have been two non-fiction books released that chronicle the Hellraiser films. The first, released on 21 May 2004, was published by Titan Books and titled The Hellraiser Chronicles. Written by Peter Atkins and Stephen Jones, with a foreword by Clive Barker, The Hellraiser Chronicles is a collection of production photographs, design sketches, excerpts from the scripts, and interviews with the cast and crew. The next book, The Hellraiser Films And Their Legacy, was released by McFarland & Company on 27 November 2006; it was written by Paul Kane, and features foreword by Pinhead actor Doug Bradley. Hellraiser Films collects the production history of all eight films, their spin-offs, as well as how the series relates to popular culture. The book provides an in-depth look at the film characters, and interpretations of the choices those characters make in the film. Hellraiser Films also provides a brief look at the fan short film No More Souls.

== Documentary film ==
A documentary, Leviathan: The Story of Hellraiser and Hellbound: Hellraiser II, was released in 2015 and comprises interviews with the cast and crew. It was directed by K. John McDonagh and produced by Cult Film Screenings. Clive Barker did not appear in the documentary due to ill health and commitment to other projects.

== Video games ==
A downloadable Hellraiser chapter for the online asymmetrical horror game Dead by Daylight was released in September 2021, featuring Pinhead as a playable character alongside a purchasable Chatterer cosmetic. Doug Bradley reprised the role of Pinhead for the game. Due to licensing issues, all Hellraiser content was removed from the game on April 4, 2025, after which Pinhead and Chatterer became available only to players who purchased them before this date.

Clive Barker's Hellraiser: Revival, a first-person survival horror game developed and published by Saber Interactive, was announced in July 2025, with creative involvement from Clive Barker and Doug Bradley reprising his role as Pinhead. The game was released for Xbox Series X/S, PlayStation 5, Nintendo Switch 2, and Windows on October 8, 2026.

== Cancelled projects ==
=== Films ===
In an interview, Doug Bradley stated that in 2002 Dimension Films received two scripts for a crossover featuring both Pinhead and Michael Myers, the antagonist of the Halloween series. One of the pitches involved Michael Myers opening the Lament Configuration as a child and being possessed by Samhain fleeing from Hell, and the Cenobites pursuing him in the present day. Although Dimension Films initially turned the project down because it believed the upcoming film Freddy vs. Jason would fail, the studio reconsidered after it grossed $117 million on a $30 million budget. According to Bradley, Clive Barker intended to return to write a screenplay while John Carpenter was being considered to direct. The project ultimately ended when Halloween's producer Moustapha Akkad rejected the idea and due to a negative response from the fans of both franchises.

Inspired by the success of the slasher film Freddy vs. Jason, Miramax contemplated a crossover between Hellraiser and Candyman. Barker, originator of both franchises, recommended against the idea.

Separately in 2002, Hellboy co-writer Peter Briggs was approached by Dimension Films to pitch a continuation to the franchise, to be called Hellraiser: Lament. His treatment, judged by Dimension Films to be "too expensive", concerned the mining town of Lament and the creation of the original puzzle boxes. The story would then have flashed forward to the present day and an attempt for Leviathan to break through into our world.

=== Video games ===
Super 3D Noah's Ark originated as a Hellraiser license for the Nintendo Entertainment System. During the course of its development, the game's abandoned the Hellraiser license and converted it into a simplified game based on the Bible.

Prior to the release of Bloodline, Magnet Interactive Studios developed an unrelated and ultimately unreleased video game called Hellraiser: Virtual Hell. Bradley acted in the game during filming of Bloodline. Miriam Van Scott, writing in the Encyclopedia of Hell, called it "a slick adventure" that "truly involves the player". In 2011, The Weinstein Company announced video games based on several of their franchises, including Hellraiser.

== See also ==
- List of Hellraiser characters
