= Hellraiser: Hellworld =

2005 horror film

- Home video poster
- Directed by: Rick Bota
- Written by: Carl Dupré
- Story by: Joel Soisson
- Based on: Characters by Clive Barker
- Produced by: Ron Schmidt
- Starring: Lance Henriksen; Katheryn Winnick; Christopher Jacot; Doug Bradley
- Cinematography: Gabriel Kosuth
- Edited by: Anthony Adler
- Music by: Lars Anderson
- Production companies: Dimension Films; Neo Art & Logic
- Distributed by: Buena Vista Home Entertainment
- Release date: September 6, 2005
- Running time: 95 minutes
- Countries: United States; Romania
- Language: English

Hellraiser: Hellworld (also known as Hellraiser VIII: Hellworld) is a 2005 supernatural horror film directed by Rick Bota. It is the eighth installment in Hellraiser series. The Hellworld script is based on a short story called "Dark Can't Breathe" by Joel Soisson and was originally not planned as a Hellraiser film – it was reworked into that format. Hellraiser: Hellworld was released straight to DVD in the United States on September 6, 2005, after a handful of minor film festival and private screenings.

The film stars Lance Henriksen in the role of the Host. Henriksen had originally been approached to play the role of Frank Cotton in the first film in the series, Hellraiser. Henriksen turned the offer down in favor of a starring role in the vampire thriller Near Dark (1987). Henry Cavill also appears in one of his first film roles.

== Plot ==
A group of young people are addicted to playing an online computer game called Hellworld which is based on the Hellraiser series. Adam was so obsessed with the game that he ultimately committed suicide after becoming too immersed in it. At the funeral, the remaining five friends blame themselves for not having prevented Adam's suicide.

Two years later, they attend a private Hellworld Party at an old mansion after receiving invites through the game. Mike, Derrick and Allison are enthusiastic about the party, while Chelsea reluctantly accompanies them. Jake, who is still very much distressed by Adam's death, only agrees to show up after a female Hellworld player with whom he has struck up an online friendship asks him to attend so they can meet. The quintet are cordially welcomed by the middle-aged party host, who offers them drinks, shows them around the mansion (allegedly a former convent and asylum also built by Phillip LeMarchand), and provides them with cell phones to communicate with other guests.

As the party progresses, Allison, Derrick and Mike find themselves trapped in separate parts of the house, and are gruesomely killed by the Host, Pinhead, and the Cenobite minions Chatterer and Bound. Jake and Chelsea become mysteriously invisible to other party guests, and are stalked by the Host and the Cenobites.

Holing herself up in the attic, Chelsea finds items belonging to Adam, and discovers that the host is his father, who blames his son's friends for not helping break his addiction. Chelsea and Jake try to flee, only to discover that they have been buried alive and are receiving messages from the host via cell phones in their respective caskets. The Host informs them that they are just coming out of a hallucination induced by a powerful psychedelic to which he exposed them upon their arrival, and that the events they have been experiencing have been the result of hypnotic suggestion and their own guilty consciences. Before leaving, he lets Chelsea know that Allison, Derrick, and Mike have all perished in their respective caskets, and that only she and Jake remain alive. As Chelsea begins to slip into another hallucination, she is abruptly pulled above ground by police and paramedics, and reunites with Jake as he is being taken into an ambulance. The police and paramedics say they were tipped off by a phone call from Chelsea's telephone. Chelsea does not know who could have called them, but as she looks towards the house, she sees Adam standing in the window.

Later, the Host sits in a bedroom, going through a suitcase containing Adam's possessions. He finds and opens the actual Lament Configuration, which summons the real cenobites. Pinhead praises Adam's ingenuity and mocks the Host's disbelief before the Chatterer and Bound cenobites tear him to pieces.

Jake and Chelsea are shown driving into the sunrise, when they receive a mysterious phone call from the Host, who suddenly appears in the back seat. The two almost crash the car but are able to stop it, and the Host disappears. The last scene shows the police entering the bedroom in which the Host opened the box, the walls blood-smeared and the box lying on the floor.

== Cast ==
- Doug Bradley as Pinhead
- Lance Henriksen as The Host
- Christopher Jacot as Jake
- Katheryn Winnick as Chelsea
- Khary Payton as Derrick
- Henry Cavill as Mike
- Anna Tolputt as Allison
- Stelian Urian as Adam
- Désirée Malonga as Masked Dancer

== Production ==
Hellraiser: Hellworld originated due to the necessity of filming an eighth Hellraiser film alongside Hellraiser: Deader as a contractual stipulation for filming in Romania; both productions were filmed between October and December 2002 in order to save costs. The screenplay was based on the short story "Dark Can't Breathe" by Joel Soisson, which Carl V. Dupré adapted into a screenplay set within the Hellraiser series, originally entitled Hellraiser: Deadworld. Many of the cast members, including Khary Payton and Lance Henriksen, were hired by chance after they had completed filming projects in Romania such as Dracula II: Ascension for Payton and Mimic 3: Sentinel for Henriksen.

== Release ==
=== Home media ===
The film was released on DVD on September 6, 2005 by Buena Vista Home Entertainment. The film debuted on the Blu-ray format for the first time on July 19, 2011 by Echo Bridge Entertainment.

== Reception ==
On the review aggregator website Rotten Tomatoes, 13% of 8 critics' reviews are positive, with an average rating of 3.2/10. Tim O'Neill for PopMatters found the film acceptable as a horror film, but a poor sequel, saying "while Hellworld is a pretty good generic horror movie, it is an abysmal Hellraiser film". JoBlo.com gave the film a positive review giving it a 7/10 and saying: "Overall, this flick was a F*cking-A good time!"

== Sequels ==
The film was followed by Hellraiser: Revelations and Hellraiser: Judgment in 2011 and 2018 respectively.
