= An Affair to Die For =

2019 film directed by Víctor Garcia

- Theatrical release poster
- Directed by: Víctor Garcia
- Screenplay by: Elliott San
- Produced by: Fabio Massimo Cacciatori; Martha Capello; Andrea Cucchi; Miguel Angel Faura; Oliver Stoltz; Isaac Torrás
- Starring: Claire Forlani; Jake Abel; Titus Welliver
- Cinematography: Eloi Molí
- Edited by: Luis de la Madrid
- Music by: Luca Balboni
- Production companies: Illogic Srl; Kobalt Entertainment; Martha Production; Roxbury
- Distributed by: Aqute Media
- Release date: 1 February 2019
- Running time: 82 minutes
- Countries: Spain; Italy
- Language: English

An Affair to Die For is a 2019 English-language Spanish-Italian thriller film directed by Víctor Garcia starring Claire Forlani, Jake Abel, and Titus Welliver. It was released on February 1, 2019.

== Plot ==
Holly, a successful professor, travels to Aspen for a rendezvous with her 27-year-old former student and current lover Everett Alan. She puts on the blindfold left for her and chains herself to the headboard of the bed using the handcuffs left for her. She is unaware that the man who next enters the room is her policeman husband Russell Pierpoint, who has sex with her. She enjoys the sex until it becomes too rough but he ignores her pleas to stop and continues, leaving her crying afterwards.

In the next room Russell tells Everett, who is bound and gagged, that he is holding Everett's wife Lydia and daughter Jessica hostage, then leaves after instructing Everett to lie to Holly and say that he was the one who just had sex with her. Everett unlocks the handcuffs and Holly berates him for his behavior while she dresses to leave, but Russell calls Everett and instructs him not to let Holly leave. Russell then calls Holly, telling her that Everett is a dangerous man responsible for the disappearance of multiple women and pleading with her to escape somehow.

Over the course of the day the two are manipulated by phone to pit them against each other for revenge. Holly slips Dave the bellboy a note that she is in trouble but Russell finds it and sends back Lydia's severed ring finger to Everett as punishment. Russell advises Everett to use pills he has left in the room to drug Holly, but Holly also uses her own supply of pills to drug Everett. Everett whispers to Holly that her husband Russell is holding his wife and daughter hostage and set up the entire encounter, then both fall unconscious from the drugs.

Holly wakes to find herself handcuffed to a railing in the room and accuses Everett of being a serial killer, warning him that Russell will bring the police force to stop him. Everett finds Russell beaten and in a wheelchair in the bedroom. Everett releases Holly and they watch Russell die from an injection of an unknown drug. A person with a disguised voice calls them and gives the ultimatum that only one of the two lovers is permitted to check out of the hotel to return to family life. Holly stabs and kills Everett, then receives a call instructing her to microwave the phone to destroy it. She is invited to come to 513 to learn the whole story, but when she arrives she finds a surveillance system monitoring her and Everett's hotel room as well and discovers Everett's wife Lydia bound and blindfolded in the bathtub with her ring finger missing. Holly unties her and checks the contents of a memory card hidden away by Everett before his death, revealing that Lydia was involved in the plot. Lydia enters and confesses that she killed Everett's other two lovers, then grabs the memory card, breaks it, and flushes it down the toilet. Holly smashes a glass vase over Lydia's head, killing her as two security guards force their way into the room and demand that she surrender.

== Cast ==
- Claire Forlani as Holly Pierpoint
- Jake Abel as Everett Alan
- Titus Welliver as Russell Pierpoint
- Nathan Cooper as Dave Parker
- Melina Matthews as Lydia Alan

== Production ==
The film was shot in Sofia, Bulgaria. The interiors of the hotel were shot in Nu Boyana Film Studios, 84 Kumata Str., Kinocentar, Sofia, Bulgaria.

== Release ==
The film was given a limited theatrical release and a VOD release in the United States on February 1, 2019.

== Reception ==
In a negative review of the film for The Hollywood Reporter, reviewer Frank Scheck wrote, "Don't even bother trying to keep up with the convoluted plot machinations of Victor Garcia's thriller about adultery gone wrong." He concludes that the film is "B-movie mediocrity" and "not even worth stopping for."

Reviewer Roger Moore of the film review website Movie Nation gave the film 1.5 out of 4 stars, writing that "the dialogue lacks punch and ultimately concluding that "this 'Affair,' as it stands, is nothing to die for, or even catch a cold over. The execution here, bland direction (a veteran of 'The Mirror 2' behind the camera), colorless dialogue and performances pitched as almost mild-mannered (save for Welliver) earn this one a bored shrug."
