= Sherlock Holmes and the Servants of Hell =

2016 book by Paul Kane

- Author: Paul Kane
- Language: English
- Genre: Mystery novels
- Publisher: Solaris Books
- Publication date: 2016
- Media type: Print (paperback)
- ISBN: 978-1781084557 (first U.S. edition, paperback)

Sherlock Holmes and the Servants of Hell is a Sherlock Holmes pastiche by Paul Kane. The book thrusts Sherlock Holmes into the world of Clive Barker's Hellraiser.

== Premise ==
After the death of his nemesis, Professor Moriarty, Holmes finds himself bored without someone with whom to match wits. He stirs from his malaise when an interesting case presents itself: Laurence Cotton's brother Francis has gone missing with only his screams from behind a locked door a clue to his whereabouts. Soon enough the trail leads Holmes to a particular puzzle box.

== Reception ==
Niall Alexander of Tor.com called the book "a whole bunch of bloody fun". Steve Dillon of Dread Central enjoyed the "parallels with the established Hellraiser mythos" such as "the tie-ins to the Cotton family and the address on Lodovico street". Scream magazine praised the book: "The dynamic between Holmes and Watson, our narrator for the majority of the book, is wonderful" and the "setting and time period are perfect". Phil Lunt of The British Fantasy Society said that "Kane gambled with an intricate recipe—but triumphed in blending unorthodox ingredients with finesse and expertise to produce one hellishly tasty cocktail!"
