= Crawl To Me =

- Issue 1 artwork

Publication information
- Publisher: IDW Publishing
- Format: Limited series
- Genre: Horror
- Publication date: 2011
- No. of issues: 4

Creative team
- Written by: Alan Robert
- Artist: Alan Robert
- Editor: Chris Ryall

Collected editions
- Crawl To Me: ISBN 1613771185
- Crawl To Me: Evil Edgar Edition: ISBN 1613773935

Crawl To Me is a four-issue comic book miniseries that was written and illustrated by Life of Agony bassist Alan Robert. The series was published through IDW Publishing from June 2011 through October 2011 and comprised four issues. The collected issues were released in a trade paperback on 17 January 2012 and a special "Evil Edgar Edition" was released on 14 August 2012 with additional artwork, an introduction by Walter Simonson, and cover artwork by Menton3. A limited "Red Label" deluxe edition was released in 2013 and featured a slipcase, signature page, and hand-drawn artwork along with the material included in the "Evil Edgar Edition".

A film adaptation was announced in 2013, but appears to have gone into development hell.

== Plot ==
Ryan Shelby, a seemingly average married man, waits for movers to arrive while talking to his wife Jess on his cell phone. He advises her to remain at her parents' house as he does not know when the furniture will arrive and does not want her or their baby Grace to go without. Ryan is startled when his dog Max barks at a fleet of oncoming police cars, whose occupants rush to the neighboring house to arrest Ryan's neighbor Edgar for charges of pedophilia and attempted kidnapping. Edgar, who is revealed to be a registered sex offender, refuses to comply with the police and opens fire. He kills several of the officers, but is also shot in the process. Having overheard the shots, Ryan decides to investigate and is horrified at the mass carnage in front of him. He is further horrified when Edgar grabs him with the intent to shoot him, only for Edgar to say that he knows Ryan and that he was "one of his favorites". Edgar tries to kill Ryan, but fails due to a lack of ammunition. Bewildered, Ryan demands to know how Edgar knows him and Edgar shows him a clown buckle, which Ryan recognizes. Reeling, Ryan runs to his house to take his pills and turns around to find that everything has vanished and that this was all a hallucination. He talks to his wife Jess soon after this and expresses concern about how real everything looked before it vanished. While talking to her, he reads the words "DO NOT TRUST HER" on his pill bottle.

Ryan's dog Max approaches him with a rat in his mouth, which he got from the house's basement. Ryan finds that the basement is covered in rat carcasses, which appears to have come from a glowing space in the wall that spews blood and skeletons. Terrified, Ryan calls out that none of this is real and that this is just another hallucination. His wife Jess opens the door and finds him, as she had decided to come home because she did not like the idea of Ryan being alone. Ryan replies that Max is gone, as he had walked into the basement's crawlspace shortly before the blood came. Believing that this is just one of his episodes, Jess urges Ryan to rest up and look for Max later. After Ryan leaves, Jess cuts open a box to see Edgar leering at her and tormenting Jess with former memories of how he used to molest her. The apparition then seems to take control of Jess's arm to use a pair of scissors to cut off chunks of her hair before directing her towards the baby, stating that it would take more than hair to get rid of him. Ryan wakes up to the sound of Grace crying and comes downstairs to find Jess poised over Grace, ready to strike. Ryan and Jess struggle over control of the scissors and Ryan ends up getting wounded in the process. Jess then runs out of the house while Ryan tries to calm her by saying that the house must be driving them mad and that they will sell the house. She replies that it is not the house that's causing this, but themselves. While talking, Jess is shown digging Edgar's clown buckle out of the snow.

Ryan manages to pull Jess back inside, but Jess is still heavily shaken from the apparition and insists that Edgar is in the house with them. Ryan is surprised that Jess knows Edgar's name, as he is unaware that Jess was molested by him and never mentioned his name around her or Grace. Ryan is then attacked by a swarm of rats. He manages to make a phone call to an extermination company, who informs Ryan that his wife already called them before giggling into the phone. A sinister looking extermination man suddenly appears at the door, demanding entrance. He introduces himself as Timmy and says that he knows Ryan, as they attended grade school together. Ryan lets him in and shows him the crawlspace, only for Timmy to say that he sees human bones inside the crawlspace. Ryan goes back upstairs to get them something to drink, during which time he hears Timmy cry out. He rushes back downstairs to see Timmy inside the crawlspace, bloodied and demanding to know why Ryan did this to him, as he had thought they had been friends. Ryan runs out of the basement in terror and goes into a bathroom to wash his hands, only to find that his body is covered with the words "U+ME4EVER", which have been carved into his skin. Upstairs, Jess wakes up to find that the baby is missing and in her place is a stick figure drawing of Edgar and Grace, which then bursts into flames. Jess then runs into the basement, where she hears Grace crying out from the crawlspace. She climbs in, demanding Grace's return while Ryan screams from the bathroom for her to let him out and that the house feels hot. Unbeknownst to him, the house is on fire due to Edgar's drawing.

Ryan manages to get out of the bathroom, only to find Edgar waiting for him, who says that they are now going to be together forever. He then proceeds to taunt Ryan by saying various things like that Ryan killed Timmy with a brick. Ryan then hears Jess calling out for him from the basement crawlspace. He goes after her and decides to finally crawl into the space himself, where he sees a glowing light before finding himself back at the crawlspace's entrance, where he is held down by dozens of arms. He cries out for someone to help him, only for several police officers to appear and say that they are trying to help him. They then pull him out of the crawlspace and it is revealed that Ryan is not an adult but actually a child. He tries to ask after Jessica and Grace, which the police assume is due to psychological trauma. They explain that Edgar had kidnapped Ryan and held him in his basement for months while he molested Ryan and several other children, revealed to be Timmy and Jess. It is further revealed that there was a shootout and that the only officer who was not terribly wounded was a rookie, who missed the crawlspace that Ryan and the others were hiding in and that if there had not been a house fire, nobody would have found them. The three children survived by eating rats and during this time Ryan and Jess grew close to one another (graffiti reading "U+ME4EVER is shown below Ryan and Jess's entwined hands). Ryan eventually ended up fighting and killing Timmy over the dwindling food supplies. The officer states that none of this was Ryan's fault, as these were extreme circumstances and everything was explained by Jess, who appears holding her doll Grace. Before the children and the officer leave the house behind, the officer hands Ryan a stuffed dog that he identifies as the missing Max.

== Development ==
Inspiration for the series came from a house Robert had moved into during Christmas of 2010, as the house had "an unfinished basement with a creepy crawl space in it". He approached IDW Publishing with the series concept and in March 2011 Robert announced plans to create Crawl To Me alongside news that his debut miniseries Wire Hangers would have a film adaptation. He chose to illustrate the comic himself, as he had found with Wire Hangers that the work process was much faster if he did it himself. He further stated that "Working this way gives me complete creative freedom to tell the stories the way that I envision them in my head" and that "Because I don't hand off the script to a penciler to draw, I don't find that I need to write a panel by panel script." Roberts also decided to use a different artwork style than the one he employed with Wire Hangers, as he "didn't want to get pigeonholed as “Oh, it's that guy's work.”"

== Reception ==
Critical reception for Crawl To Me has been positive, and Roberts has reported that the first edition of the initial trade paperback sold out. Bloody Disgusting praised the series for its storyline and wrote "Robert manages to find a balance between not knowing whether the characters are insane, suffering from illness, or if this stuff is actually happening in some sort of surreal world." They also praised the "Red Label" deluxe edition, as they felt that the new artwork and the oversized printing "allows you to appreciate all the nitty-gritty details of Robert's artwork" and further praised Robert's artwork style as being "a unique style that meshes digital and hand drawn images." The Jersey Journal also had praise for Crawl To Me, as they felt that the first issue gave a deeper perspective of people suffering from mental illness and the emotions that they feel while trying to live with their ailment.

== Film adaptation ==
In 2012 it was announced that Crawl To Me would have a film adaptation and that it would be directed by David Armstrong. David White and T.J. Cimfel were brought on that same year to write the script and it was further announced that Roberts would be producing the film alongside Jeff Mazzola and Christopher White. Armstrong later left the project and was replaced in 2013 with Víctor Garcia. Roberts has stated that if possible, he would like to contribute to the film's soundtrack.

After years in development hell, In July 2025 an official concept trailer Crawl To Me was finally released. Robert stated “It feels poetic to finally have Crawl to Me back in my hands,” says Robert. “This is the adaptation fans have been waiting for — true to the book, and made with a team that understands its psychological complexity and raw terror.”
