= Mirrors 2 =

- DVD cover
- Directed by: Víctor Garcia
- Written by: Matt Venne
- Based on: Into the Mirror by Kim Sung-ho
- Produced by: Betsy Danbury; John Portnoy; Nick Thurlow; Todd Williams
- Starring: Nick Stahl; Emmanuelle Vaugier; Christy Carlson Romano; Evan Jones; William Katt
- Cinematography: Lorenzo Senatore
- Edited by: Robb Sullivan
- Music by: Frederik Wiedmann
- Production companies: Fox 2000 Pictures; Regency Enterprises; Upload Films
- Distributed by: 20th Century Fox Home Entertainment
- Release date: October 19, 2010
- Running time: 90 minutes
- Country: United States
- Language: English
- Budget: $4 million

Mirrors 2 is a 2010 American supernatural horror film. It is a stand-alone sequel to the 2008 film Mirrors, not featuring any of the cast and crew from the original film. Released by 20th Century Fox in direct-to-video format, the film is written by Matt Venne and is directed by Víctor Garcia. The film grossed $4.5 million in home sales.

== Plot ==
Max Matheson clinically died after a car accident killed his fiancée, Kayla. Although Max was later resuscitated and the other driver, who was inebriated, was held responsible, the ordeal left Max with tremendous guilt and trauma. However, after psychological treatments with Dr. Beaumont, he makes some progress.

Max's father, Jack, reopens the Mayflower Department Store in New Orleans. He hires Max as a security guard, replacing the old one who recently cut himself up on duty and quit. Upon accepting the job, Max is introduced to the store manager, Keller Landreaux, the buyer, Jenna McCarty, and the vice-president of operations, Ryan Parker.

Before his first shift, Max sees a vision of a dead woman in a mirror, and then sees Jenna's naked reflection ripping off her head. Meanwhile, Jenna falls through her shower's glass doors upon being scared by her reflection, and a shard of glass decapitates her. Max realizes that he foresees the deaths in the mirrors. The next night, he sees Ryan's reflection being eviscerated and tries to warn him. Later, Ryan dies in the same way. Max runs over to Ryan's apartment, but is too late.

After calling Jack to tell him he's quitting, Max sees his father's face covered in cuts and races to his house. Jack's reflection almost kills him, but Max saves him and decides to stay at the Mayflower. Max hints to whoever is manipulating the mirrors that he will do anything it wants him to do if it spares his father. Max later returns to the Mayflower, but he is confronted by Detectives Huston and Piccirilli, who recount what happened to Jenna and Ryan. Max denies any involvement, and they let him get back to work, though they remain suspicious.

Max goes to the main mirror to find out who the ghost is. Max's reflection uses his flashlight to show him the way. Following the light, he finds a box containing an ID of Eleanor Reigns, a new employee of the Mayflower who disappeared two months ago. The light shines outside, and Max finds a missing person flier for Eleanor. He reads it before contacting Eleanor's older sister, Elizabeth, to learn details of her disappearance. Together, they discover that someone had deleted the surveillance files on the night of Eleanor's disappearance from the store's computer.

Max and Elizabeth visit Henry Schow, the store's former security guard and the last person who accessed the files. His reflection had scarred Henry's mouth. Through Henry, they learn that Eleanor is dead. Two months prior, during the Mayflower's groundbreaking party, Jenna spiked Eleanor's drink with drugs while Ryan was talking to her. Keller raped Eleanor while she was intoxicated, and finally killed her when she tried to run away. Henry found Keller burying Eleanor's body in Mayflower's basement crawlspace, and Keller threatened him into deleting the surveillance files to cover up his crime.

After her death, Eleanor, whose spirit is trapped in the mirror world, began seeking revenge on those responsible for her rape and murder. She manipulated Henry's reflection to eat broken shards of glass before killing Jenna and Ryan. When Eleanor realized that Max could see her, she forced him to help her make contact with her sister by threatening Jack's life. Max understands that his clinical death from the car accident has given him the ability to see the spirits.

Max and Elizabeth go to the Mayflower and search for Eleanor's body in the basement. Keller chases them after learning that they know what happened. He nearly strangles Elizabeth, but Max saves her, thus recreating the clinical death encounter and allowing Elizabeth to see Eleanor. After seeing Eleanor again, Max wrestles Keller, pushing him into the main mirror. Eleanor, acknowledging Max for his help, pulls Keller inside the mirror and kills him, leaving Max and Elizabeth shocked.

At the police station, Henry confesses to the detectives his involvement in the cover-up of Eleanor's murder. It's implied that the police declare Keller a fugitive, and blame him for Jenna and Ryan's deaths. The interrogation room's one-way mirror starts to crack when Henry is alone, and he calmly sees Eleanor in its reflection, thus giving up on survival. Eleanor kills Henry as the screen cuts to black.

== Cast ==
- Nick Stahl as Max Matheson
- Emmanuelle Vaugier as Elizabeth Reigns
- Christy Carlson Romano as Jenna McCarty
- Evan Jones as Henry Schow
- William Katt as Jack Matheson
- Lawrence Turner as Keller Landreaux
- Stephanie Honoré Sanchez as Eleanor Reigns
- Jon Michael Davis as Ryan Parker
- Lance E. Nichols as Detective Huston
- Wayne Pére as Detective Piccirilli
- Jenny Shakeshaft as Kayla
- Ann Mckenzie as Dr. Beaumont

== Production ==
Filming took place from November 16 to December 18, 2009, mainly in Baton Rouge, Louisiana.
