= Jack and the Beanstalk (2009 film) =

2009 film directed by Gary J. Tunnicliffe

- Film poster
- Directed by: Gary J. Tunnicliffe
- Written by: Flip Kobler; Cindy Marcus
- Produced by: Gary DePew
- Starring: Colin Ford; Gilbert Gottfried; Christopher Lloyd; Chloë Grace Moretz; Wallace Shawn; Katey Sagal; James Karen; Daniel Roebuck; Madison Davenport; Chevy Chase; James Earl Jones
- Cinematography: Brian Baugh
- Edited by: Andrew Cohen
- Music by: Randy Miller
- Production company: Avalon Family Entertainment
- Release date: November 6, 2009
- Running time: 95 minutes
- Country: United States
- Language: English

Jack and the Beanstalk is a 2009 American fantasy adventure comedy film directed by Gary J. Tunnicliffe, from a story based on the classic fairy tale of the same name. The film stars an ensemble cast led by Colin Ford, Gilbert Gottfried, Christopher Lloyd, Chloë Grace Moretz, Wallace Shawn, Katey Sagal, James Karen, Daniel Roebuck, Madison Davenport, Chevy Chase, and James Earl Jones.

== Plot ==
Jack Thatcher (Colin Ford) must perform a heroic deed or flunk out of fairy tale school. He sells a valuable possession for magic beans that grow into a giant beanstalk overnight. One bean also is eaten by the family goose Grayson, turning them into a mostly human-man (Gilbert Gottfried). They climb the enchanted beanstalk due to Jack wanting to prove himself a hero after the legacy of his father, with Grayson accompanying him to try and keep him safe. They enter a magical and dangerous world to rescue Destiny (Madison Davenport), a little girl who has been transformed into a harp by an evil giant.

This version of the tale includes references to other fairy tale characters as well as contemporary elements.

== Cast ==
- Colin Ford as Jack
- Chloë Grace Moretz as Damsel in Distress / Jillian Squarejaw
- Christopher Lloyd as Headmaster
- Adair Tishler as Rapunzel
- Billy Unger as Prince Charming
- Emily Rose Everhard as Red Riding Hood
- Sadie Eve as Sleeping Beauty
- Victoria Atilano as Ugly Step Sister
- Atalaya Atilano as Mean Step Sister
- Anthony Skillman as Hansel
- Sammi Hanratty as Gretel
- Daniel Roebuck as Mayor Lichfield
- Wallace Shawn as Broker / Booker / Lancelot Squarejaw
- Katey Sagal as Jack's Mother
- Gilbert Gottfried as Grayson
- James Karen as Verri Saddius
- Madison Davenport as Destiny
- David Mattey as Giant
- James Earl Jones as Giant's Voice
- Jeff L. Deist as Dobbytok
- Gary J. Tunnicliffe as Dobbytok's Voice / Nervous Lumberjack
- Frank Payne as Sergeant Who
- Kevin Schon as Officer What
- Hal B. Klein as Officer Where
- Chevy Chase as General Antipode

== Release ==
The film premiered at the Samuel Goldwyn Theater in Beverly Hills on November 6, 2009. It later screened at the Newport Beach Film Festival on April 24, 2010, before being released on DVD in the United States by Screen Media Films on May 11, 2010.

== Reception ==
=== Critical response ===
Tracy Moore of Common Sense Media called the film "goofy fun" and gave it 3/5 stars.

In an otherwise positive review, MovieGuide wrote, "The sets and costumes are occasionally hokey. Also, the occasional toilet humor and slapstick comedy sometimes detracts from the movie’s natural charm." Nevertheless, MovieGuide gave the film 3/4 stars.

Sloan Freer of Radio Times called it a "charmless take on the classic fairy tale" and later lamented that "James Earl Jones wastes his rich tone as the voice of the underwhelming goliath."

Jason Best of What's on TV wrote that Jack and the Beanstalk "seeks to emulate the playful wit of the wondrous The Princess Bride but falls woefully short." He went on to note that "Christopher Lloyd, Wallace Shawn and Chevy Chase are also involved, so you’d expect the film to be a lot funnier than it is, but Gary J Tunnicliffe’s flat direction doesn’t give anyone a chance to shine."

Donna Rolfe of The Dove Foundation wrote, "This is a charming fairy tale with encouraging values and colorful characters who will entertain the entire family."

The Netflix company DVD.com called it a "family-friendly comedy" and gave it 3^{1/3} out of 5 stars.

=== Accolades ===
Year	Award	Category	Recipient	Result	Ref.
2011	32nd Young Artist Awards	Best Performance in a DVD Film - Young Actor	Colin Ford	Won	
