= Marie O'Regan =

British horror writer and editor

- Occupation: Writer
- Website: https://www.marieoregan.net/

Marie O'Regan is a British horror writer and editor.

== Biography ==
Marie O'Regan is based in Derbyshire where she is the co-editor of a number of books and has written for horror magazines including Fortean Times, Rue Morgue, and DeathRay and had her short stories anthologised. O'Regan, with her husband Paul Kane, has also published a book of interviews with horror writers. She was the Chairperson of the British Fantasy Society for four years (2004–2008) as well as the co-chair of the UK Chapter of the Horror Writers' Association. She has been chair of StokerCon UK with the convention due in April 2020. She conducts workshops and tutors students. O'Regan has edited books highlighting authors such as Clive Barker, Neil Gaiman, Brian Aldiss and Muriel Gray.

== Bibliography ==
=== Books ===
- Mirror Mere
- Bury Them Deep
- In Times of Want and Other Stories
- The Last Ghost and Other Stories
- Voices in the Dark (2010)

=== Anthologies ===
- Hellbound Hearts
- The Mammoth Book of Body Horror
- Carnivale: Dark Tales From the Fairground
- The Mammoth Book of Ghost Stories by Women
- Phantoms
- Exit Wounds
- Wonderland
