= Mimic 2 =

2001 science fiction horror film by Jean de Segonzac

- DVD cover
- Directed by: Jean de Segonzac
- Written by: Joel Soisson
- Based on: "Mimic" by Donald A. Wollheim; Characters by; Guillermo del Toro; Matthew Robbins
- Produced by: Joel Soisson; Michael Leahy
- Starring: Alix Koromzay; Bruno Campos; Will Estes; Jon Polito; Edward Albert
- Cinematography: Nathan Hope
- Edited by: Kirk M. Morri
- Music by: Walter Werzowa
- Production company: Neo Art & Logic
- Distributed by: Dimension Home Video
- Release date: July 17, 2001
- Running time: 82 minutes
- Country: United States
- Language: English
- Budget: $10 million
- Box office: $81,531 (Hong Kong)

Mimic 2 is a 2001 science fiction horror film, directed by Jean de Segonzac, with a script inspired by a short story of the same name by Donald A. Wollheim. The movie was a direct-to-DVD sequel to Mimic (1997), and was followed by Mimic 3: Sentinel (2003).

The thriller stars long-time film veteran Edward Albert, along with Alix Koromzay, Bruno Campos and Jon Polito.

== Plot ==
Four years after the events of the first film, after three men are discovered hideously mutilated (their faces have been removed) and strung up among New York City's high-tension wires, Detective Klaski (Bruno Campos) stumbles upon a link: Each of the men knew entomologist Remi Panos (Alix Koromzay), a teacher at an inner-city high school. Klaski considers Remi to be a prime, albeit unlikely, suspect in the killings until he witnesses for himself the shape-shifting creature that has been stalking Remi: an intelligent mutant insect with the face of its previous victim that wants to mate with Remi.

Klaski, Remi and a pair of her students get trapped inside the school as the creature hunts them down. Remi gets separated and runs into the creature which does not harm her but instead seems interested in her. Remi then gets cornered and the creature attempts to give her pizza. Meanwhile, a special forces unit, headed by the militant leader known only as Darksuit (Edward Albert), gets ready to fumigate the school with poisonous gas. After all the trapped humans seem to have escaped the fumigation, and with the help of a heroic Klaski in Remi's case, inspection teams following through find the creature's recently vacated husk and, later on, the mangled corpse of Klaski.

It appears that the creature, impersonating Klaski, has been caring for Remi's well-being with a mind to fulfill its base purpose. Unfortunately for it, when they finally meet in a suspenseful setting in Remi's apartment, she decapitates it. However, it is not dead as cockroaches can live up to two weeks without a head and Remy and one of the students, who is now living with her, are left wondering how to handle the situation.

== Cast ==
- Alix Koromzay as Remi Panos
- Edward Albert as Darksuit
- Bruno Campos as Detective Klaski
- Will Estes as Nicky
- Gaven E. Lucas as Sal Aguirre
- Jon Polito as Morrie Deaver
- Jody Wood as Detective Clecknal
- Jim O'Heir as Lou
- Brian Leckner as Jason Mundy
- Paul Schulze as Phillip

== Reception ==
=== Critical response ===
The film received negative reviews. Christabel Padmore from Apollo Movie Guide said: "The only reason you might watch Mimic 2 is if you're a fan of some of the special effects used in the first movie". Keith Brown from Eye for Film judged: "There's nothing particularly wrong with Mimic 2, as B-movie monster movies go". Nathan Rabin for The Onion wrote: "Mimic 2 is the very definition of an arbitrary sequel: it essentially remakes its little-loved predecessor, which combined Cronenbergian weird science, Alien-style claustrophobia, and abundant gore to little discernible effect". eFilmCritic reviewer Jack Sommersby called "incompetent and unimaginative on just about every level". The Horror Review felt: "Though it doesn't set any genre or cinematic precedence, it does take the time to develop character relationships, create atmosphere, and establish dread within its viewer, resulting in an enjoyable second outing that, in many respects, trumps its forerunner". The publication gave it 4 out of 5 stars. The film holds 8% positive critics on Rotten Tomatoes.

=== Accolades ===
- Won: Video Premiere Award – Best Visual Effects
- Nominated: Video Premiere Award – Best Cinematography
- Nominated: Video Premiere Award – Best Editing

== Sequel ==
Mimic 3: Sentinel was released in 2003. Directed by J.T. Petty, its script was also inspired by the short story "Mimic" by Donald A. Wollheim. While a direct-to-DVD sequel to both Mimic and Mimic 2, it takes a different thematic approach.
