= Mimic 3: Sentinel =

2003 science fiction horror film by J. T. Petty

- Official DVD cover
- Directed by: J. T. Petty
- Written by: J. T. Petty
- Produced by: Ron Schmidt
- Starring: Karl Geary; Amanda Plummer; Alexis Dziena; Rebecca Mader; John Kapelos; Keith Robinson; Lance Henriksen
- Cinematography: Alex Sterian
- Edited by: Kirk M. Morri
- Music by: Henning Lohner
- Distributed by: Dimension Films
- Release date: October 14, 2003
- Running time: 77 minutes
- Country: United States
- Language: English
- Budget: $10 million

Mimic 3: Sentinel is a 2003 science fiction horror film written and directed by J. T. Petty, with a script inspired by a short story of the same name by Donald A. Wollheim. The movie was a direct-to-video sequel to Mimic (1997) and Mimic 2 (2001).

Mimic 3: Sentinel stars horror film veteran Lance Henriksen and takes a departure from the tone of the first two films, as it has a feel similar to Alfred Hitchcock's Rear Window rather than the action/horror tone of its predecessors.

== Plot ==
Unable to leave the germ-free confines of his sterilized bedroom for any real stretch of time, environmentally hypersensitive Marvin (Karl Geary) spends his days taking pictures of his neighbors from his window. Occasionally catching glimpses of his young sister Rosy (Alexis Dziena) hanging out with the neighborhood drug dealer, Marvin's lens remains mostly fixed on a mysterious neighbor known as the Garbageman (Lance Henriksen) and pretty neighbor Carmen (Rebecca Mader), while his slightly overbearing mother (Amanda Plummer) rests on the couch. As neighbors begin disappearing and mysterious figures move in and out of Marvin's viewfinder, the secluded voyeur begins to suspect that a sinister force is at work in his neighborhood. Though Rosy and Carmen are anxious to assist in a little detective work, the situation soon begins to spiral out of control upon the discovery that the Judas breed is far from extinct.

== Cast ==
- Lance Henriksen as Garbageman
- Karl Geary as Marvin Montrose
- Alexis Dziena as Rosy Montrose
- Keith Robinson as Desmond
- Tudorel Filimon as Birdman (credited as Filimon Tudorel)
- Rebecca Mader as Carmen
- Maria Oprescu as Ma Bell
- Mircea Constantinescu as Mr. Pasture
- Mircea Anca Jr. as Noah Pasture
- Amanda Plummer as Simone Montrose
- John Kapelos as Detective Gary Dumars
- Ion Haiduc as Moustache
- Nicolae Constantin Tanase as Thug #1 (credited as Nicolae Constantin)
- Luana Stoica as Female Victim #1
- Marius Silviu Florentin as Thug #2
- Nick Phillips as CDC Worker
- Alex Cioalca as Adam Pasture
- Mike J. Regan as Mimic Bug #1 (uncredited)
- Alex Revan as Mutant Elite (uncredited)
- Gary J. Tunnicliffe as Mimic Bug #2 (uncredited)
