= Hellraiser: Revelations =

2011 American horror film by Víctor Garcia

- Home media release artwork
- Directed by: Víctor Garcia
- Written by: Gary J. Tunnicliffe
- Based on: Characters by Clive Barker
- Produced by: Aaron Ockman; Joel Soisson
- Starring: Steven Brand; Nick Eversman; Tracey Fairaway; Sebastien Roberts; Devon Sorvari; Sanny Van Heteren; Daniel Buran; Jay Gillespie; Stephan Smith Collins
- Cinematography: David A. Armstrong
- Edited by: Matthew Rundell
- Music by: Frederik Wiedmann
- Distributed by: Dimension Extreme
- Release date: March 18, 2011
- Running time: 75 minutes
- Country: United States
- Language: English
- Budget: $300,000 (estimated)

Hellraiser: Revelations is a 2011 American horror film written by Gary J. Tunnicliffe and directed by Víctor Garcia. It is the ninth film in the Hellraiser film series. It follows the fates of Steven Craven and Nico Bradley, two friends who discover a puzzle box that opens a gateway to a realm inhabited by sadomasochistic monsters known as the Cenobites. The film stars Steven Brand, Nick Eversman, Tracey Fairaway and Stephan Smith Collins.

The film was produced in a matter of weeks, due to an obligation on Dimension Films' part to release another Hellraiser film or risk losing the rights to the film series. Due to the quick turnaround time and the rushed production, series star Doug Bradley declined to participate, making this the first entry in the series in which he does not play Pinhead. It was released in a single theater for a crew screening that was ostensibly open to the public on March 18, 2011, then released to DVD on October 18, 2011.

== Plot ==
Friends Nico Bradley and Steven Craven run away from home where they travel to Mexico to film themselves engaging in several days' worth of partying before disappearing. The Mexican authorities return their belongings to their parents, including a video recording made by Steven that documents their final moments and an ornate puzzle box.

A year later, the families of the two missing boys Nico and Steven gather together for dinner. Tensions rise when Emma, Steven's sister and Nico's girlfriend, expresses frustration with their lack of closure. She demands that her mother Sarah reveal the contents of Steven's videotape, which she has been obsessively watching in private. Later, Emma has a look at the tape, which documents Steven and Nico picking up a girl in a bar. A flashback reveals that Nico murdered the girl while having sex in the bar's restroom, and later threatened to implicate Steven in the killing to force him to continue their "vacation" together. Nico later receives the puzzle box from a vagrant, who offers it to Nico as a way to experience a new kind of sensual experience.

Sifting through Steven's effects, Emma finds the puzzle box that she recognizes from the video. When she attempts to manipulate it, Steven suddenly reappears covered in blood. The families try to rush Steven to the hospital but discover they have become stranded, and Steven warns that the "Cenobites" are coming. Emma plays with the puzzle box again, causing intense sexual arousal. Emma attempts to seduce Nico's father Peter, and then has a deeply intimate conversation with Steven in his room only to kiss, but as Steven caresses her breast Emma has a vision of chains and mutilated bodies. Soon after, Peter is killed by the same vagrant. Steven then goes downstairs, retrieves a shotgun, and shoots his father Ross before holding the rest of the household at gunpoint.

Another flashback reveals that Nico solved the puzzle box, opening a portal to the realm of the Cenobites: extra-dimensional sadomasochists led by Pinhead. Steven flees, but Nico is taken to the Cenobites' realm to be subjected to extreme torture and mutilation. Later, while having rough sex with a prostitute, Nico is able to communicate with Steven through the puzzle box and convinces him to kill the prostitute to allow him to escape from hell, emerging skinless and emaciated. Steven later kills several more prostitutes so their blood can be used to regenerate Nico, but he is unable to regrow his skin. When Steven finally balks at helping him, Nico kills Steven and takes his skin. Dying, Steven uses the puzzle box to contact the Cenobites and become one of them to get revenge.

The "Steven" holding the families hostage is revealed to really be Nico wearing Steven's skin, who taunts the families. He reveals that one of the reasons why he and Steven ran away from home was because they were both angry that Ross and Nico's mother Kate were secretly having an adulterous affair with each other. He demands that Emma solve the puzzle box for him, intending for the Cenobites to take her in his place, thus assuring his freedom. Emma opens the portal and summons the Cenobites—including Steven—who kill Kate for speaking out of turn. Nico attempts to barter his life for Emma's, and while Pinhead notes that Emma has a dark sexual desire that he admires, he refuses and chooses to reclaim Nico for further experiments.

As Nico is taken away, Ross shoots and kills him in a dying act of revenge. Displeased at having lost a victim, the Cenobites take Sarah as a replacement for Nico. Ross apologizes, then dies in Emma's arms. Left alone, Emma reaches for the puzzle box.

== Cast ==
- Tracey Fairaway as Emma Craven
- Steven Brand as Ross Craven
- Stephan Smith Collins as Pinhead
  - Fred Tatasciore as the voice of Pinhead
- Nick Eversman as Steven Craven
- Sebastien Roberts as Peter Bradley
- Devon Sorvari as Sarah Craven
- Sanny van Heteren as Kate Bradley
- Daniel Buran as Vagrant
- Jay Gillespie as Nico Bradley / Pseudo
- Jolene Andersen as Female Chatterer
- Jacob Wellman as Robert Ellen
- Sue Ann Pien as Hooker / Skinned Face Girl #1
- Adel Marie Ruiz as Mexican Girl

== Production ==
=== Development ===
Facing the expiration of their rights to the Hellraiser franchise, The Weinstein Company, while still apparently working on the long announced remake of the original film, decided to rush an eighth sequel into production; essentially a cinematic ashcan copy. The film was announced in August 2010.

Doug Bradley, who portrayed the character Pinhead in the previous Hellraiser films, did not return as Pinhead. Bradley was quoted as saying:

I have been approached just in this last week (w/b 16 August) regarding a proposed new Hellraiser film. This is not the 'remake' which has been endlessly discussed for the last three years: with the working title Hellraiser: Revelations, it will be the ninth film in the series. I would stress that I have had no contact from, or negotiations with, anyone from Dimension Films: rather these contacts have been by way of private discussion with individuals involved with this project ... Following these discussions, and after reading the script and giving it due consideration, I have decided not to participate. The ink is barely dry on the script, and it is scheduled to be in front of the cameras in two weeks time and in the can by the middle of next month (September 2010). The minuscule shooting schedule is more than matched by the budget ... Whether or not this means that somebody else will be stepping up to play Pinhead, I have no idea. I guess we can watch this space together ... One way or another, this does not seem to me to represent a serious attempt to revive the Hellraiser franchise. However, I wish everyone who will be directly involved in the making of this film, good luck with it.

Instead, Pinhead was played by Stephan Smith Collins. Images of Pinhead from the film were leaked, but the film's director Víctor Garcia said they did not convey how Pinhead would look in the film.

=== Filming ===
The film was shot over the course of three weeks in Los Angeles for Dimension Films.

== Release ==
The film was released to a single theater in California on March 18.

=== Home media ===
Home video distributor ARC Entertainment released the film on DVD and Blu-ray on October 18, 2011 under the Dimension Extreme banner.

== Reception ==
Clive Barker
(@RealCliveBarker)
tweeted:

I have NOTHING to do with the fuckin' thing. If they claim its from the mind of Clive Barker, it's a lie. It's not even from my butt-hole.

August 21, 2011

On the review aggregator website Rotten Tomatoes, 0% of six critics' reviews are positive, with an average rating of 2.5/10.

Dread Central states: "Not only does this entry make all the other sequels seem great in comparison, you could easily confuse this for some Hellraiser mockbuster from the folks at The Asylum". A second review criticized the new 'pseudo-pinhead', saying "Pinhead doesn't appear to be doing much with his free time but stroking bloodied chains and making sinister faces ... it's a farcical twist on the Austin Powers mini-me".

Scott Weinberg called the film a "contractually mandated piece of intentional garbage that exists for no other reason than pure, simple greed ... This is amateur hour stuff all the way, and it'd be almost endearingly, stupidly enjoyable if this witless cinematic refuse wasn't dancing on the grave of a true classic of the genre".

A two-and-a-half out of five was awarded by Richard Scheib of Moria, who stated that while the effects and new Pinhead left much to be desired, Revelations did have an interesting story and effective twist, and "follows the original far closer than any of the other Hellraiser sequels ever did".

Clive Barker responded to the film on Twitter saying, "I want to put on record that the flic [sic] out there using the word Hellraiser IS NO FUCKIN' CHILD OF MINE!"

== Sequel ==
A tenth film, titled Hellraiser: Judgment, was shot after this. The film was written and directed by Gary J. Tunnicliffe, and stars Paul T. Taylor as Pinhead.

== See also ==
- Ashcan comic
