= British Fantasy Society =

Logo (c. 2008)

The British Fantasy Society (BFS) was founded in 1971 as the British Weird Fantasy Society, an offshoot of the British Science Fiction Association. The society is dedicated to promoting the best in the fantasy, science fiction and horror genres.

In 2000, the BFS won the Special Award: Non-Professional at the World Fantasy Awards. The society also has its own awards, the annual British Fantasy Awards, created in 1971 at the suggestion of its then-president, Ramsey Campbell.

It held its first Fantasycon, a long-standing speculative fiction convention, in 1975. The 2025 Fantasycon merged with World Fantasy Convention in Brighton.

The British Fantasy Society has no direct connection with the earlier science fiction group using the same name from 1942 to 1946.

== Publications ==
The BFS currently publishes two magazines, BFS Horizons, its fiction publication; and the BFS Journal, its non-fiction and academic publication. Each has two issues a year, with alternating schedules. These are available in both print and electronically. It also produces a monthly members only email, which rounds up news, reviews and usually includes an exclusive short story. Previous publications include Prism, which featured news, reviews and columns, Dark Horizons, which featured fiction, non-fiction and poetry, and enjoyed the patronage of many established authors, artists, critics and journalists, and New Horizons, issued twice a year from 2008 to 2010, which published fiction and articles, but not poetry. There was also Shelflings, an ezine collecting reviews from the BFS website.

The society continues to produce a series of publications, including numbered chapbooks of works by William Hope Hodgson, Michael Moorcock, Ramsey Campbell, Peter Berresford Ellis, August Derleth, and M. R. James. Magazines previously published include Winter Chills (later renamed Chills), edited by Peter Coleborn, and Mystique: Tales of Wonder, edited by Mike Chinn. Both these magazines were independent publications, but linked to the BFS, and in the case of Mystique, absorbed into Dark Horizons after a few issues. Paperback titles include Clive Barker: Mythmaker for the Millennium by Suzanne J. Barbieri, and Annabel Says, a modern ghost story by Simon Clark and Stephen Laws. In 2007, it published HP Lovecraft in Britain: A Monograph, written by Stephen Jones and illustrated by Les Edwards.

=== Dark Horizons ===
Dark Horizons, the journal of the British Fantasy Society, was published from 1971 to 2010, before being merged with the British Fantasy Society Journal. Its contents and subject matter varied, according to the tastes of the editors and the contents of the other magazines being published by the BFS at the same time, but generally included some combination of fantasy, science-fiction and horror-related fiction, articles, poetry and artwork.

Its editors included:

- Rosemary Pardoe, issues 1–4, 1971–72
- Adrian Cole, issues ?–6, 1973–?
- Adrian Cole and David A Sutton, issues 7–?
- Stephen Jones
- Mike Chinn and John Merritt, issues 19–22, 1979–1981
- David A Sutton, issues 23–29, 1981–?
- David J. Howe
- Peter Coleborn, Mike Chinn and Phil Williams, issue 37, 1998
- Peter Coleborn and Mike Chinn, issue 38, 1999
- Debbie Bennett, issues 39–46, 2001–2004
- Marie O'Regan, issue 47, 2005
- Marie O'Regan and Jenny Barber, issues 48–49, 2005–2006
- Peter Coleborn and Jan Edwards, issues 50–52, 2006–2008
- Stephen Theaker, issues 53–57, 2008–2010

=== The BFS Journal ===
The BFS Journal is produced biannually and collects together non-fiction articles on Fantasy, Horror and Science Fiction. These include academic papers, book and film reviews, author interviews and more. The current editor for the BFS Journal is Allen Stroud, who took over from Stuart Douglas in 2016.

== The BFS Committee ==
=== Executive leadership ===
- President – Juliet Mushens
- Chair – Shona Kinsella
- Secretary – David Green
- Treasurer – Stewart Hotston
- Deputy Chair – Sian O'Hara

=== Editorship ===
- BFS Horizons Editor – C. M. Duncan
- BFS Journal Editor – Kevan Manwar
- Poetry Editor – Ian Hunter
- Art Editor – Jenni Coutts

=== Awards administrators ===
- British Fantasy Awards Admin – Paul Yates
- Short Story Competition Lead Judge – Steven Poore
- Art Competition Lead Judge – Jenni Coutts

=== Marketing and outreach ===
- Webmaster and Communications Officer – E. M. Faulds
- Online Content Editor and PR – Lauren McMenemy
- Social Media – Lucie Goulet
- Archivist and Stockholder – Karen Fishwick

== Sources ==
- Peter Roberts, "British Fantasy Society", The Encyclopedia of Science Fiction, ed. by John Clute and Peter Nicholls (New York: St Martin's Press, 1995), p. 159
- David A Sutton, “When Dark Horizons Turned Magenta”, Dark Horizons 50 (2007), pp. 4–5
- Debbie Bennett, “21st Century Horizons”, Dark Horizons 50 (2007), p. 72
- Mike Chinn, “From Dinosaurs to Disks: Fifty Issues of Dark Horizons”, Dark Horizons 50 (2007), pp. 88–89, 2007
