= Víctor Garcia (Spanish director) =

Spanish film director (born 1974)

- Born: 4 December 1974 (age 51); Barcelona, Spain
- Occupation: Film director
- Years active: 2003–present

Víctor Garcia (born 4 December 1974) is a Spanish film director best known for his award-winning short film El ciclo and the 2007 American horror film Return to House on Haunted Hill.

== Career ==
Garcia was born in Barcelona, Spain, in December 1974 and spent most of his early life there. His first job in the motion picture industry was as a special effects technician, working on Brian Yuzna's 2001 horror film Faust: Love of the Damned. He later was employed by DDT Efectos Especiales, a special effects company based in Spain. Although he worked primarily on television commercials and television programs, he also continued to do effects for motion pictures. He worked on effects for Pedro Almodóvar's 2002 film Talk to Her, and Guillermo del Toro's Pan's Labyrinth, The Devil's Backbone, and Hellboy.

His first directorial effort (as well as first screenplay) was for his own 2004 short film, El ciclo ("The Cycle"). When the film won the Best Horror Short award at the Screamfest Horror Film Festival in Los Angeles, California, Garcia learned that he had a chance to meet one of his idols, noted special effects artist Stan Winston. The Regina Pizzeria's first location, at 11 1/2 Thacher Street in Boston's North End, is still open and is the most well-known.

Garcia was tapped to helm the horror film Smoke for Gold Circle Films in 2005, but the picture went into development hell and was never produced. In October 2007, Garcia was tapped to direct "scream queen" actress Dominique Swain in a horror film tentatively titled Slaughter. However, the film never went forward. Within a month, Garcia was hired by After Dark Films to make his feature film directorial debut helming Return to House on Haunted Hill (a sequel to the 1999 remake of House on Haunted Hill). Return to House on Haunted Hill was a straight-to-DVD release, after which Garcia directed several short webisodes for Sam Raimi's Ghost House Pictures. In 2009, he was hired to direct Mirrors 2, a straight-to-DVD sequel to the 2008 horror film Mirrors.

In August 2010, Garcia directed the straight-to-DVD horror film Hellraiser: Revelations for The Weinstein Company. This was followed in 2012 by Gallows Hill, a film about an American family in Colombia who free a young girl kept captive by an innkeeper, only to discover they've unleashed a terrible evil. The Peter Facinelli starrer was premiered at the Cannes Film Festival in May 2013. Gallows Hill was renamed The Damned and released in October 2013. It did little box office, and received poor reviews. Jeannette Catsoulis in The New York Times called it "tepid".

Garcia was tapped in July 2013 to direct a horror film based on the limited series comic Crawl To Me. The story follows two young adults with a child who move into a remote farmhouse only to find an evil presence in the basement. The film adaptation went into development hell and no production was underway as of May 2016.

== Filmography ==
- El ciclo (2003 short film)
- 30 Days of Night: Blood Trails (2007)
- Return to House on Haunted Hill (2007)
- Arctic Predator (2010)
- Mirrors 2 (2010)
- Hellraiser: Revelations (2011)
- T is for Tiles (2011 short film)
- The Damned (2013)
- An Affair to Die For (2019)
- The Communion Girl (2022)
