= List of V.I.P. episodes =

V.I.P. is an American action/comedy-drama series, which ran from 1998 to 2002 in syndication.

== Series overview ==
Season	Episodes	Originally released	
Season	Episodes	First released	Last released
1	22	September 26, 1998	May 22, 1999
2	22	September 25, 1999	May 20, 2000
3	22	October 7, 2000	May 19, 2001
4	22	September 22, 2001	May 18, 2002

== Episodes ==
=== Season 1 (1998–99) ===
No. overall	No. in season	Title	Directed by	Written by	Original release date	Prod. code
1	1	"Beats Working at a Hot Dog Stand"	J. F. Lawton	J.F. Lawton	September 26, 1998	101
Vallery Irons, a woman who accidentally saves a celebrity, is then hired to be a real-life bodyguard with an agency that solves cases. Bryan Cranston guest stars as Colt Arrow. Guest stars: Daniel Roebuck as Iron Green, Dean Norris as Jackson Lasarr, Kevin Light as Brad Cliff, Amber Smith as Davina, Javier Grajeda as Detective Grispy, Angela Oh as Keri, Liz Smith as Gossip Columnist
2	2	"What to Do With Vallery When You're Dead"	Patrick Norris	Charles Holland	October 3, 1998	107
The VIP team tries to interest media tycoon Viktor Balek to become their client. However measly Internet documentary-maker Arnie Feign begs for their services pro bono, claiming Balek wants him killed by Thursday, when he'll have exposed him, which the professionals reject as paranoia. After Arnie's car is blown up, Val makes them agree: he can repay their services in kind, as Internet advertisement. Guest stars: Pauly Shore as Himself, Udo Kier as Viktor Balek, Wayne Péré as Arnie Feign, Shashawnee Hall as Ferris, Greg Albanese as Avery Bardoosh, Wayne Donvito as Sensei Leon, Bingo Dinh as Shadrak
3	3	"Bloody Val-entine"	Sidney J. Furie	Teleplay by : Steven Kriozere; Story by : J.F. Lawton & Steven Kriozere	October 10, 1998	105
VIP is hired by Ian Ziering as protection against stalking paparazzo Kip Lashane. Kay insists to 'take the lead' to spend time with her Beverly Hills 90210 idol, but that turns out to be a masked assassin. It's Tasha's ex, Peter 'the Owl', a former-KGB killer hired by mobster Scornabacho to eliminate Lashane. Guest stars: Marie Osmond as Herself, Mark Tymchyshyn as Kip Lashane, Aleksandr Kuznetsov as The Owl, Alexander Enberg as Obsessed Fan, Martin Kove as Mr. Scornabacho, John Cho as Flower Delivery Guy
4	4	"One Wedding and Val's Funeral"	J. F. Lawton	Morgan Gendel & Ron Zimmerman	October 17, 1998	102
Tasha expected King Solton of Ardenia to hire them out of gratitude for once helping to save his life, but it's Val's Hollywood fame which gets VIP hired. However Val's primary assignment is to act as royal matchmaker for Soltan's heir, Prince Jordan, a good sport who wants to modernize. Val keeps presenting him to commoners, even her waitress friend Maxine, but he picks slick Alex. VIP must ward off attacks from violent anti-monarchists, notably religious sect fanatics. Kay has romantic delusions about the prince. The court has its own hidden agenda, but there are even worse secrets. Guest stars: Bill Maher as Himself, Eric Steinberg as Prince Jordan, Patrick Kilpatrick as Tensil, Natasha Pavlovich as Alex / Florentine Swann, Mark Chaet as King Solton, Irena Davidoff as Queen Sima, Daran Norris as Narrator, Rocco Salata as Prince Jordan's Bodyguard
5	5	"Scents and Sensibility"	Adam Nimoy	Morgan Gendel and Gabrielle Stanton & Harry Werksman	October 24, 1998	108
Cosmetics and perfume firm Bioglam hires VIP to protect it against industrial espionage. A sample of the revolutionary pheromone product Kizmet has just been stolen during a break-in. Top priority however is the inventor, lab genius Ken Miller. He secretly tests it illegally, and is hence irresistible to most females. However his former lab protégé, Dr. Tina Stokes, sells the formula to arms dealer Wilgur, because of a side-effect: after repeated use it causes extreme aggression. Steve Austin guest stars. Guest stars: Joseph Kell as Dr. Ken Miller, Angela Harry as Dr. Tina Stokes, Carlton Wilborn as Wilgan, Kristen Dalton as Julie Knox, Boris Lee Krutonog as Badger, Diane Farr as Helen, Jackie Debatin as Angel, Emmanuelle Bach as Dr. Townsend
6	6	"Diamonds are a Val's Best Friend"	Farhad Mann	Teleplay by : Rick Suvalle; Story by : Morgan Gendel & Rick Suvalle	October 31, 1998	106
VIP is hired to guard a large, valuable diamond, and is then tasked with recovering it after it gets stolen under their watch. Guest stars: Jay Leno as Himself, David Groh as Don Franco, Stewart Finlay-McLennan as Walter Parsegian, Roger Floyd as Gino Franco, Boris Lee Krutonog as Badger, Javier Grajeda as Detective Grispy, Lou Casal as Vincent Franco, Nelson Mashita as Mr. Tokawa, Jonathan Breck as Irving Millbrook
7	7	"Deconstructing Peri"	Chuck Bowman	Hannah Shearer	November 7, 1998	113
Hollywood director Gil Rosen hires V.I.P. to protect his prima donna Star Fox SciFi star, Peri Woodman, who is the target of sabotage. The first suspect is a stalking fan, but her fraternity party-animal boyfriend Ty Spencer may have been ignored too much. Or his dad, senator Barton Spencer, with presidential ambitions, is the most likely to feel threatened by her intended 'memoirs'. Val keeps meeting Barton's shady security chief, Mr. Banks. Guest stars: Joey Lawrence as Himself, Elizabeth Bogush as Peri Woodman, Thomas Newton as Ty Spencer, Cliff De Young as Senator Barton Spencer, Ricky Paull Goldin as Gil Rosen, Joe Sabatino as Mr. Banks, Nikita Ager as Kim, Anne Von Herrmann as Diane, Jerry Penacoli as Reporter
8	8	"Val Got Game"	Greg Yaitanes	Steven Kriozere	November 14, 1998	110
Idealistic basketball agent Phil Sherman (C. Thomas Howell) hires VIP to protect his client, Kirby, who is too dumb to distinguish between good- and ill-willed people. Ruthless rival Kent Breakstone will stop at nothing to eliminate Kirby as competition for his boy, suave Jimmie. Kay goes undercover to keep a close eye on Kirby, but the naive pair falls in love. Guest stars: Charles Barkley as Himself, John Salley as Himself, Sam Sarpong as Kirby Tucson, Brian Cousins as Kent Breakstone, Charlie O'Connell as Jimmie, Doug Kruse as Cross, Trent Cameron as Flip Webley, Andrew W. Walker as Derskin, Elimu Nelson as Reggie, Forbes Riley as Irene, Andrew Walter Butler as Daryl Wilcox, Kwesi Fulton as Dougie Hodges
9	9	"Vallery of the Dolls"	James A. Contner	Teleplay by : Ethlie A. Vare; Story by : Ron Zimmerman & Gabrielle Stanton and Harry Werksman	November 21, 1998	111
Rapper Coolio hires VIP, due to being threatened by a stalker with a bomb on her chest. Glamour magazine boss Gower Jantzen (RT) hires VIP to find his missing centerfold girls and protect the remaining millennium competition contenders. An Asian gang keeps kidnapping girls. Guest stars: Sydney Walsh as Chloe Nolan, Karen Kim as Jennifer Conrad, Robin Thomas as Gower Jantzen, Art Chudabala as Yoshi, Ron Yuan as Kazuo, Jessica Lee Maider as Karmen De La Vega, Nikki Schieler Ziering as Amber Davis, Andre'a Kim Walker as Shandah, Reneé Tenison as Donna Fabre, Will Schaub as Rob, Ping Wu as Chang
10	10	"Midnight in the Garden of Ronnie Beeman"	Barry Primus	Teleplay by : Eric Estrin; Story by : Morgan Gendel & Eric Estrin	January 16, 1999	104
To Tasha's horror, popular as well as grotesque talk-show host Ronnie Beeman, a Val fan, hires VIP as 'classy' studio goons, and as his personal bodyguard after a failed on-air bomb attack by extremists prepared to use suicide pills. A hawk a talon tattoo actually identifies them as a secret super-commando team of five, who strike again. When Val stands in as a guest presenter, her soft style taps into ruthless studio politics. Guest stars: Eric Barros as Himself, Gregory Itzin as Ronnie Beeman, Jay Underwood as Adam Elliot, Christopher Michael as Daniel J. Kilborne, Chuck Sloan as Marty, Javier Grajeda as Detective Grispy, Mike Jolly as Burnham, James DiStefano as Gene, Jerry Hauck as Ben Hale, Susan Peretz as Wife in Audience, Keith Ayers as Decker, Vanessa Dorian as Stephanie
11	11	"Good Val Hunting"	Robert Radler	Gabrielle Stanton & Harry Werksman	January 23, 1999	103
Multi-billionaire Eric Collier, who made his fortune in arms, hires VIP to protect him while practicing extreme sports. Once the team is under contract, they see him on TV offering $10,000,000 to whoever kills him within 48 hours. After they ward off a few attempts on his life and join him in a fortress complex, a rough surprise follows. Jerry Springer guest stars. Guest stars: John D'Aquino as Eric Collier, Steven Culp as Financial Officer, Javier Grajeda as Detective Grispy, George Marshall Ruge as Sir Richard White, Nancy Young as Felicity Adair, Damon Caro as Chazz Maleek, Kane Hodder as Matthew Adair, Mario Roberts as Javier
12	12	"Escape from Val-catraz"	Deran Sarafian	Eric Estrin	January 30, 1999	109
Convicted bank-robber Harry Murdock's ex, Cindy, hires VIP for their daughter Cynthia's wedding with Ted. Just then Harry makes a deal to reveal where he stashed away $17,000,000 he stole from corrupt cops, who stole it from Nikki's family, the Franco mobsters. He demands VIP protection in vain. His transport is attacked by his ex-partner, Rene Batiste, but Val and Nikki pick him up and go in hiding, while the FBI searches for all three. But so are Rene Batiste and his present partner, Garvick. Harry is determined to attend the wedding, and an extra. Guest stars: Robin Leach as Himself, Tristan Rogers as Harry Murdoch, Laurie Fortier as Cynthia Murdoch, Dey Young as Mrs. Murdoch, Alex Hyde-White as Kerwick, Joseph Gian as Rene Batiste, Vincent Guastaferro as Warden, Justin Walker as Groom Ted, Bart Braverman as Maurice Afshani, Paul Carafotes as Minister, Al Gagow as Oswaldo Falcon
13	13	"The Last Temptation of Val"	Patrick Norris	Steven Kriozere	February 6, 1999	117
Martial-arts star Johnny Loh left Hong Kong due to being innocently blamed for the death of his friend, a stuntman. While they counter a bank robbery, Val discovers he lives in LA as businessman Jay Chesler's bodyguard, Fong. He has to kidnap Nikki to get at his computer, but it is for a noble reason: it contains the evidence he gathered against the Tong (Chinese mob). But their boss, Han, is on his trail and is very determined to eliminate the threat. Alfonso Ribeiro guest stars. Guest stars: Jeff Speakman as Himself, Daxing Zhang as Han, Michael Woods as Jay Chesler, T.J. Shaboz as Judson, Clint Jung as Kai-Tan, Michael McFall as Credit Officer Nissen, Pamela Paulshock as Emily Chesler, Patricia Skeriotis as Vance, Desmond Miller as Desmond, Michael Owen as Mike
14	14	"Val Under Siege with a Vengeance"	Scott Paulin	Teleplay by : Milos Bachman; Story by : Ron Zimmerman & Gabrielle Stanton and Harry Werksman	February 13, 1999	112
Helping the limber Brewster-twin models is a piece of cake. Guarding cryptography tycoon Simon Wirth's wife Jessica's annual fund-raiser fashion show seems even easier. But GDR-nostalgic Heinrich Anser's gang drugs and impersonates the band, Moscow Knights. They take hostages to use the US treasury codes for destabilizing the capitalist financial system. Serially adulterous Simon needs firm prodding to help escapees Val and Kay. Guest stars: Brad Greenquist as Heinrich Anser, Derek Brewer as Himself, Keith Brewer as Himself, Marty Rackham as Simon Wirth, Robin Riker as Jessica Wirth, Javier Grajeda as Detective Grispy, Autumn Winters as Whitney, Michael Komurov as Stoli, Jacob Chambers as Kurt, Laurie Rose as Sindee, Mo Gallini as Drug Dealer #1
15	15	"Val on the Run"	Farhad Mann	Rick Suvalle	February 20, 1999	114
Val's production friend Steve Wizner, a rising Hollywood studio executive, calls her just in time for VIP to rescue him from thugs sent by bootleg video bosses he will expose in court. He chooses VIP over FBI protection, but is shot in the pool with her by Helga, his Swedish topless 'housekeeper'. VIP suspects FBI witness protection Agent Lambert is the dirty link, but he's not the only one playing a deceptive game. Guest stars: Shannon Tweed as Herself, John Allen Nelson as FBI Agent Lambert, Morgan Englund as Steve Wizner, Javier Grajeda as Detective Grispy, Grant Mathis as Agent McCoy, China Jesusita Shavers as Cheryl, Eyerly St. James as Helga
16	16	"Thunder Val"	Patrick Norris	Morgan Gendel	February 27, 1999	120
NSA agent Darman enlists high-IQ sociopath prisoner Dr. Stokes to trick the buyer on St.Kitts Thunder. That contact poison was just busted by the FBI from Russian rogue scientist Gregor, who died in the FBI bust. She accepts to play along if protected by VIP. So as a cover, they accept to do a sexy magazine's bikini calendar photo-shoot on a Caribbean cruise with professional photographer Boka Helmstadt. A nightly attack indicates there must be a mole. Erik Estrada guest stars. Guest stars: Angela Harry as Dr. Tina Stokes, Scott Bryce as Darman, Christian Oliver as Volker Helmstadt, Jackie Debatin as Angel, Stephen Kupka as Gregor
17	17	"The Quiet Brawler"	J. F. Lawton	J. F. Lawton	March 6, 1999	116
Val enjoys a champagne dinner with Baywatch beefcake David Chokachi, which is uneventful except for a ninja attack. Also, with his Mike Brawler action movie-franchise in a slump, studly star David Hart starts a new health products line and buys the gym where he trained as a kid, in a crime-ridden neighborhood. Fan Val signs-up all of VIP as members. Local gangster boss Colecord enlists Hart's vindictive, ever-beaten movie villain Rex Revo who is, in reality twice, his muscle-mass, because Hart tries to stop local 'clients' from buying the steroids his goons push. Rex goes out of control in order to force Hart into a real, no-gloves-nor-rules street-fight duel. Anderson's Baywatch co-star David Chokachi guest stars. Guest stars: Joseph Michael Bucci as Dave Hart, Mongo Brownlee as Rex Revo, Jillian Barberie as Foxy Levin, Sonny Marinelli as Colecord, Mark Ruiz as Julio, Sophia Santi as Ms. Martinez, Joe Bucaro as Griff, Allison Dawn Kugel as Gwen
18	18	"K-Val"	Bruce Seth Green	Morgan Gendel & Tom Abraham	March 12, 1999	119
Someone anonymously calls and e-mails that radio talk-show doc Lonnie Hippelman will also pay for her show 'hurting too many people'. Her gentle husband Roy, a space engineer, hires VIP to protect them and adolescent son Jeremy. The culprit proves a scarily able bomber and an elusive master-planner. There's no shortage of suspects. Guest stars: Sheila E. as Herself, Jeannetta Arnette as Dr. Lonnie Hippelman, David Naughton as Roy, David Moreland as Peter, Boris Lee Krutonog as Badger, Max Kasch as Jeremy, Chad Bannon as Beefy Guy
19	19	"Mudslide Val"	Sidney J. Furie	Tom Chehak	May 1, 1999	118
Plastic surgeon Richard D. Gold calls VIP to protect him and 'someone else'. Before they arrive, he's been killed by a lethal injection that was staged as a cardiac arrest. The team sassily enjoys checking on a lead to Louis Westin's luxury spa, Red Oak. There they find Hollywood producer Frank Zeit in hiding. Yet a more likely target is Louis, in his former identity as secret agent Bob Porter. He suspects drug lord Adam Banta, who actually checks-in with his murderous accomplice as the Johnsons. Guest stars: Downtown Julie Brown as Herself, James Yaker as Louis Westin / Bob Porte, Ash Adams as Adam Banta, David Kagen as Frank Zeit, Javier Grajeda as Detective Grispy, Tammy Tavares as Karen Rite, Dan Erickson as Dr. Richard Gold, Elisha Choice as Winnie
20	20	"Raging Val"	R. W. Ginty	Story by : Morgan Gendel & Paul Chitlik; Teleplay by : Paul Chitlik	May 8, 1999	115
The team tries to help Rigo Fernandez, Quick's last boxing opponent, who is in trouble with his manager, Carlos Montecinas, who is working for the Russian mob. VIP first must work out the fighters' pasts, then deal with present secrets and treason. As a cover, Val also tries her hand at training, as the boxing show must go on. Gilbert Gottfried guest stars. Guest stars: David Groh as Don Franco, Billy Gallo as Rigo Fernandez, Greg Wrangler as Carlos Montecinas, Aly Dunne as Katrina Polakov, James Horan as Smith, Francis Fallon as Jib Hanley
21	21	"Three Days to a Kill"	Sidney J. Furie	Eric Estrin	May 15, 1999	121
Kay is excited when her college lover, hunky architect Stu Solomon, calls for a dinner. She insists to offer him free protection upon learning he was threatened by tycoon Clay. VIP however soon fins Stu is far from innocent; in fact he can resist neither a scam nor a flirt. Morgan Fairchild guest stars. Guest stars: Sean Kanan as Stu Solomon, Ramy Zada as Clay, Greg Grunberg as Loeb, Doug Jeffery as Shea, Melinda Songér as Ramona Flynn, T.J. Shaboz as Judson, Jack Kerrigan as Vincent
22	22	"Val the Hard Way"	Larry Rapaport	Teleplay by : Morgan Gendel & Steven Kriozere; Story by : J. F. Lawton & Morgan Gendel	May 22, 1999	122
Las Vegas crime lord "The Prophet" recruits the 'DD Girls', assorted LA vamp-criminals, for a secret job in Vegas. LAPD detective Grispy has arrested them and hires VIP to impersonate them, being physical look-a-likes but with different specialties. They must keep it up long enough to find The Prophet's mysterious boss. The perks are tempting enough to postpone Val's security anniversary, but the job proves equally dangerous, especially when the real DD Girls escape. Sherman Hemsley, Penn & Teller, Eva Mendes and Ice-T guest star. Guest stars: Javier Grajeda as Detective Grispy, Gary Colombo as Zambrano, Rose Heeter as McKenna, Steve Chase as Bishop, Jill Noel St. Marks as Monica, Dale Clemons as Emil

=== Season 2 (1999–2000) ===
No. overall	No. in season	Title	Directed by	Written by	Original release date
23	1	"Return of the Owl"	Patrick Norris	Rick Suvalle	September 25, 1999
VIP is recruited to guard Thorvald Knudsen, the Norwegian delegation leader in an ongoing territorial waters conflict with equally pacific neighbor Sweden. Tasha discovers the place is swarming with people from her past, including the Owl and other exes, and she's programmed hypnotically with a killer-command. It all ties in somehow to the Russian mob, with a surprising accomplice. Erik Estrada, Donny Osmond, and Marie Osmond guest star. Guest stars: Paul Michael as Thorvald Knudsen, Thomas Kretschmann as The Owl, Eva Halina as Yvonne Brevig, Yasha Blackman as Petrov, Roman Varshavsky as Ivan, Ian Quinn as Boris, Merritt Yohnka as Jeffrey the Assassin, Joe Davis as Yon Lindstrom
24	2	"Big Top Val"	Patrick Norris	Leslie Ray	October 2, 1999
Billionaire Ronald Zane hires VIP to baby-sit his daughter Amelia, normally a quiet nerd. However she insists to have some sassy fun. That includes a visit to Cirque de Lumière. There Nicki recognizes the Esperanza trapeze brothers as Tommy Wipp and Tino Scarlatti, who staged a car explosion years ago to convince the mob and the FBI that they're dead. Those mob family members use the circus as a cover for an illegal arms trade. The team goes undercover while Nicki questions Don Franco who killed who. Meanwhile the brat escapes. David Groh guest stars. Guest stars: Richard Lewis as Ronald Zane, Brittany Alyse Smith as Amelia Zane, Ernie Reyes Jr. as Johnny's Sparring Partner, Tom Silardi as Tommy Wipp, Rick Hoffman as Tino Scarlatti, Anthony Albano as Chaz, Michael A. Di Barco as Nick Franco, Malcolm Yates as Harding, Thomas Kenny as Joey Garlic, Cheryl Kennard as Suzie Zane
25	3	"Ransom of Red Val"	Sidney J. Furie	Story by : Ethlie Ann Vare; Teleplay by : Jodie Lewis	October 9, 1999
VIP is asked to serve as haughty rock diva Iris Leon's bodyguards by her manager-boyfriend and his deputy, on account of a stalker. They soon find they set that up behind her back, for the 'free' publicity. But real danger soon turns up. Val replaces Iris's stand-in, and ends up kidnapped in her place. Guest stars: Jay Underwood as Adam Elliott, Daphnee Duplaix as Iris Leon, Jillian Barberie as Foxy Levin, Dean Fortunato as Rudy Hayes, Nick Meaney as Logan the Kidnapper, Samantha Maloney as Herself, Tommy Lee as Dance Audience Member
26	4	"Dr. StrangeVal"	Farhad Mann	Tom Abraham	October 16, 1999
Ukrainian general Koyla Trofimov and his whoring assistant steal their country's nuclear launch codes in the presidential aid's case. They come to LA to sell it. But it gets mixed up with Val's silly friend Maxine's 'invention', a 'maxi case' combining beauty and office functions, which they hope to sell for a fortune to luggage king Slotkin. The FBI is after the nuclear buyer. Guest stars: Bronson Pinchot as Himself, Peter J. Lucas as Gen. Koyla Trofimov, Lucinda Weist as Gen. Trofimov's Assistant, Neal Matarazzo as Agent Redding, Wayne Thomas Yorke as Al Slotkin, Bjorn Johnson as Josef Kosygin, Sam Scarber as General Ursus, Bill Kemp as Scott, Mark De Alessandro as Agent Miller
27	5	"Quick and the Dead"	Larry Rapaport	Eric Estrin	October 23, 1999
An Italian B-movie star first hires V.I.P. as security for her directing debut, then her former driver Johnny Loh. Her golden family heirloom talisman becomes the target of a ruthless gang. Meanwhile Quick is the easy victim of a gang of identity thieves who get him arrested for stunts they pull, again and again. Verne Troyer guest stars. Guest stars: James Black as Elwood Snow, Maria Colla as Francesca DeLea, Clayton Norcross as Travis, Sylvester "Bear" Terkay as Bruno, Wilmer Calderon as Hector, Nicole Cortez as Veronica, Ryan Christopher Keys as Jesse, Scott L. Schwartz as Mo Big
28	6	"Valma and Louise"	Greg Yaitanes	Story by : Steven Kriozere & David Aaron Freed; Teleplay by : Steven Kriozere	October 30, 1999
TV talk show host Jay Leno recruits V.I.P. to guard his precious collector's sports car Priscilla. Val naively insists to give a scared girl and her baby a ride and free protection. Tasha was right to object: it's Frank Newsom's bank robber gang member Sharon, who is being chased by ruthless bounty hunters, with the 'baby' a doll to hide the looted bonds in. And the gang isn't laying back either. Jay Leno and Tommy Lee guest star. Guest stars: Alexandra Wilson as Sharon Carter, Laura McLauchlin as Kim Huesman, Robert LaSardo as Car Mechanic, Kevin Gage as Frank Newsom, Tim Abell as Police Officer Smith, Jeannette Papineau as Herself
29	7	"Stop or Val's Mom Will Shoot"	Adam Nimoy	Morgan Gendel & Ron Zimmerman	November 6, 1999
Nervous about a visit form her ma Carol Irons, Val takes a risk to overpower car-hijacker Marco Bielak. He's arrested but soon released, and hell-bent on revenge after ma arrives, who gets a crush on Johnny but believed Val's friends run a courier service. Meanwhile sinister businessman Roger Dintsman hires crooks to get hot software from SXC, the firm of Carol's employer Zupo. It turns out both cases link tightly. But Val also gets a unique change to learn about her pa she presumed dead. Loni Anderson guest stars. Guest stars: Joseph Bottoms as Chief Criminal, Alex Wexo as Roger Dintsman, Jason Azikiwe as Kyle Zupo, Robert Joseph as McGurk, Steve Falcone as Marco Bielak, Michele Seipp as Connie
30	8	"Val Goes to Town"	Chuck Bowman	J. F. Lawton	November 13, 1999
Val's client is confused with David Duchonvy, so they're both kidnapped by mistake, but easily freed. Val obliges when the city orders VIP suspended and all staff disarmed during a ruthless investigation instigated by hostile LA councilor Doris Blasker for questionable methods and damages during successful operations. Val and the team face trial proceedings. Just then, the Prophet and his gang pull off their most daring plan: a fake terrorist apocalyptic blackmail. Ice-T guest stars. Guest stars: Lisa LoCicero as Doris Blasker, Dean Haglund as Himself, Jillian Barberie as Foxy Levin, Javier Grajeda as Detective Grispy, Ian Paul Cassidy as Gideon, Derek Mears as Reno, Marie Caldare as Traci, Karen Sheperd as Leena, Faith Minton as Big Brenda
31	9	"Mao Better Blues"	Farhad Mann	Ralph Phillips	November 20, 1999
While shopping in LA China Town, Val and Johnny are handed by a fleeing Chinese woman a box and told to guard it. Johnny cares for the box of deity Kai-tong, the key to freedom and a treasure, but it can only be opened by someone pure of heart. Now they become the target of triad baron Victor Chang and Peking officials, who want to steal the fortune as well as arresting democracy activists. Kimberly "Lil' Kim" Jones guest stars. Guest stars: Billy Blanks as Himself, Bruce Locke as Victor Chang, Suzanne Whang as Diana Lu, Michael Paul Chan as Captain Go, Will Yun Lee as Bobby Wu, Jack Ong as Lu-Shan, Jeff Campbell as Denny, Ron Yuan as Lucky
32	10	"Why Too Kay?"	Corey Michael Eubanks	Story by : Morgan Gendel & Rick Suvalle; Teleplay by : Rick Suvalle	November 27, 1999
Jeff hires VIP to investigate why his adolescent son Jason Roberts has not contacted his parental home in months from a live-in school for the super-gifted in the Neotek Ranch. In fact Jason is in a secret government research project, due to being hooked on a computer game, while being manipulated by Katherine 'Kitty' Johnson. Kay goes undercover and discovers she once was at Neotek. The others liberate/kidnap Jason, only to learn afterward Jeff isn't his real dad. Tasha's spy friend Ebrique knows the project's apocalyptic potential. Guest stars: Hugh Hefner as Himself, Ed Quinn as Jeff, Javier Grajeda as Detective Grispy, Robert Williams as Jason Roberts, Michelle Clunie as Mary Tespin, Jessica Greco as Little Kay, Candace Lifson as Kitty, Jayson Oertel as Ray, Mary Ostrow as Mrs. Robbins, Michael Phenicie as Marcus Fisher, Shannon Whirry as Katherine Johnson
33	11	"Dangerous Beauty"	Chuck Bowman	Story by : Mitchell Binder; Teleplay by : Madison Lobrac & Mitchell Binder	January 22, 2000
Painter Bobby Xero is being stalked by a mysterious woman. Agent Steven Holz knows of various secret admirers. Holz reports to tycoon-client Van Loder, who ordered specific colors, regardless of the artistic design. After his works are attacked in the gallery, the team guessing the auction there may be the key. Guest stars: Rita Rudner as Bidder at Art Auction, Salvator Xuereb as Bobby Xero, Amir AboulEla as Paul Van Loder, Gerry Anderson as Relic, Gildart Jackson as Auctioneer, Alexandra Barreto as Stacy, Bronwyn Cornelius as Trixie, Erin Daniels as Unknown, Paige Brooks as Phoebe
34	12	"Analyse Val"	Sidney J. Furie	Tom Abraham	January 29, 2000
Dr. Gilbert Kemper, the US Vice President's psychiatrist, is nearly kidnapped while he asks V.I.P.'s protection against the Squires of Liberty. They threatened him to expose the VP's dirty secrets as blackmail ammunition for a crucial crime fighting bill. The team takes Kemper to safety on abandoned military base Manitou island. There he analyzes the team dynamics, obviously based on the fake stories about Val's professional excellence. Guest stars: Albie Selznick as Dr. Gilbert Kemper, Geoff Meed as Eugene Burke, Teddy Lane Jr. as Lavelle, Michael Owen as Sputnik
35	13	"All You Need is Val"	Steve Cohen	Kathy Slevin	February 5, 2000
The VIP professionals are hell-bent on the body guards job for Cora DeFarge, the haughty CEO of often threatened multinational Cora DeFarge Industries. Johnny's martial arts land them the lucrative job. Val and Key insist however to keep doing ecologist freebies, so they split to honor a contract with PETA, especially a benefit starring ex-Beatle Paul McCartney. Both teams soon discover their clients are bitter enemies. And Cora is covering up dirty business. Guest stars: Sandra Bernhard as Cora DeFarge, Dan Matthews as Himself, Javier Grajeda as Detective Grispy, David "Shark" Fralick as Hulk #1, Stacie Randall as Unknown, Gregory Zarian as Executive #1, Sterling Campbell as Himself, Chrissie Hynde as Herself, Paul McCartney as Himself, Kate Pierson as Herself, Fred Schneider as Himself
36	14	"New Val'd Order"	Gary Yaitanes	Morgan Gendel	February 12, 2000
VIP is hired to protect a sun tan brand's Hawaiian beauty pageant contestants. By the time they discover that Beller and ex-NATO-major Greta Krantz are planning to kidnap them, the professionals have also been captured. The ruthless program plans to 'breed' ideal soldiers from men who survive fights to the death and women winning multitasking-contests. Only Kay and Johnny, who was about to be officially enrolled, are left to mount a rescue. Guest stars: Katarina Witt as Greta Krantz, Rosa Blasi as Cassandra, Doug Kruse as Cross, Gerry Anderson as Relic, Adrian Neil as Beller, Laura Wachal as Marcie, Jennifer Lothrop as Blaine, Jodi Verdu as Ms. Smith
37	15	"Vallery's Secret"	J. F. Lawton	Tom Abraham	February 19, 2000
Fashion designer Cleo Robbins is nearly killed by a bomb in her sports-car, but gets saved because of an accidental visiting ex: Quick. The heavy bomb suggests it's about business secrets, so VIP investigates people like tycoon Griffin Pierce and Cleo's own deputy. Vamp Val is ideal for this undercover scene. Kai discovers Cleo's firm isn't squeaky clean either. Guest stars: Richard Biggs as Griffin Pearce, Angelica Bridges as Cleo Robbins, Brian Fitzpatrick as Griffin's Co-conspirator, Kim Marie Johnson as Rani, Karl Makinen as David, Nancy O'Dell as Sheri Kornblatt, Eileen Weisinger as Pete
38	16	"Hard Val's Night"	Greg Yaitanes	Story by : Kathy Slevin & Morgan Gendel; Teleplay by : Kathy Slevin	February 26, 2000
In Orange Country to look for a heavenly Acres timesharing flat, VIP bumps into Lit-lead singer AJay Popoff in his boxers, while being pursued by the souvenir hunters who took his pants, so the rock band hires them. AJ also assigns Val to recuperate his lucky charm, an Elvis type 'Cat Eye' belt buckle. They succeed at Stiles' souvenir shop, but get pursued for it by Thelonius Brock's goons, although X-rays prove it's paste, without the real precious jewels. This episode famously premiered the music video for Miserable which featured Val as a giantess who lets the members of Lit perform on her body before she devours them. Guest stars: Lit as Themselves, Bob Koherr as Thelonius Brock, David Hayman as Stiles, Michael Papajohn as Fry, Athena Kottak as Female Technician, Eddie Perez as Henchman
39	17	"Third Eye Blond"	Robert Radler	Story by : Morgan Gendel & Hannah Shearer; Teleplay by : Hannah Shearer	April 1, 2000
Bartholomew, psychic to the Hollywood stars, stumbles across the just dumped corpse of long-missing business heiress Hilary von Ryan after a party in the Hollywood Hills. Her fatally clumsy kidnappers, hired by Sid Hadari, who wanted her shares, chase 'Bart'. He hires VIP, without telling them or the police, but uses the story for his TV show. Val dates hunky but broke race car-driver Cole Calloway. Kay hits on with initially resented bright computer specialist Ned. Guest stars: David Lee Smith as Cole Calloway, Jeff Trachta as Bartholomew, Javier Grajeda as Detective Grispy, Alex Demir as Sid Hadari, Jeff Juday as Ned, Jason Beck as Jimmy, Katie Rich as Delia, Glenn Phillips as Al, Ruthie Cohen as Elevator Woman
40	18	"Val's on First"	Greg Yaitanes	Eric Estrin	April 8, 2000
Baseball talent Buck Rice (FR) hires VIP, to protect him against whoever wants him off the present team beneath his talent, having recovered from a two year-old car incident back injury. Buck makes many enemies among jealous players and by serially seducing. His conquests include Carmen, the mistress of film producer Jerry Goldring, who already hated Buck for messing up his betting. Guest stars: Tom Arnold as Bernie Mellon, Steve Lyons as Himself, Robert Floyd as Buck Rice, Raymond O'Connor as Jerry Goldring, Julie St. Claire as Carmen, Douglas Owen McDonald as McNeely, Meta Golding as Meter Maid, Anthony Diaz-Perez as Rojas, Tony Masa as Roto, Russ Courtnall as Russ, Curtis Lupo as Dominic
41	19	"Val Point Blank"	Greg Yaitanes	Eric Estrin & Morgan Gendel	April 29, 2000
Crook Faust's pseudo-terrorist Shining Brigade hijacks the QE2, while Val's East Vancouver high-school is holding its 1990 class reunion there. Because the veterans are training with the Navy Seals, only Johnny came with Val and self-invited curious Maxine. Guest stars: Michelle Stafford as Nancy Biggs, Steve Valentine as Faust, Christian Boeving as Navy SEAL Instructor, Dimitri Diatchenko as Unknown, James Hall as Tyrone, Steve Shenbaum as Graham Henley, Phina Oruche as Mercy, Sean Newman as Fabian Miller, Michael Fachetti as Paulie, Ryan Christopher Keys as Jesse's Ex-Boyfriend, Adoni Maropis as Boyle, Chuck Zito as Mikey
42	20	"Franco in Love"	Chuck Bowman	Rick Suvalle	May 6, 2000
Nicoletta's godfather Don Franco is tailed and shot but recovers well. He asks her, his elected mob family heir, to hold the fort so long, notably run the transport firm. As he suggested, the Francos are under attack from the late Tony Scarnavaco's cocky sons Tony Jr. and Mark. The VIP team discovers secret agendas and attempts a modern 'classy' style make-over. Guest stars: David Groh as Don Franco, Nick Spano as Tony Scornovaco Jr., Jim Knobeloch as Spalding, Michael Cunio as Mark Scornovaco, Lisa Pescia as Silvana Scornovaco, Lou Casal as Uncle Vincent, Chuck Zito as Mikey, Michael Fachetti as Paulie, Marshall Hodges as Bodyguard / Cruz, Stephen Hart as Miller
43	21	"Lights, Camera, Val"	Peter DeLuise	Steven Kriozere & Morgan Gendel	May 13, 2000
Rod Bernstein hires VIP to help him and driver Alvin physically deliver his newest cosmic disaster action movie. Alas, party-animal Rod owes money and an unreleased movie. His direct and indirect creditors send goons to collect, but selling the film only adds Chick Mars to the Hollywood brawl. Val also enters the deals equation as an actress. Christopher "Kid" Reid guest stars. Guest stars: David DeLuise as Alvin, Timothy Omundson as Chick Mars, Michael Bailey Smith as Tomahawk, Finneus Egan as Demitrius Washington, Marcus Young as Billy, Dan Bell as Dr. Evans, Noah Blake as Dr. Greenberg, Peter DeLuise as Man Bumping Into Johnny Loh, Marco Sanchez as Kovak
44	22	"Ride of the Valkyries"	Peter DeLuise	Morgan Gendel & Steven Kriozere	May 20, 2000
After 22 years in the hole, ruthless Kane is sprung from Paraguayan jail by Hall's team. Their target just left Hawaii for LA, where he saves Val and is identified as her long absconded dad, Jed(ediah) Irons. Tasha's CIA contact Dante finds out he was involved in the fatal operation Omega, over 20 years ago. He explains it was betrayed and got him disgraced. Then he's apprehended by Hall's team. Guest stars: Michael Harris as Kane, Christian Bocher as Kane's Offsider, Lee Majors as Jed Irons, Michael Philip as Hall, Scott Haven as Eckerle, Gerry Anderson as Relic, Thomas Rosales Jr. as Soldier

=== Season 3 (2000–01) ===
No. overall	No. in season	Title	Directed by	Written by	Original release date
45	1	"Survi-Val"	Patrick Norris	Leslie Ray	October 7, 2000
Val wants to participate in FTS network's Danger Island survival reality. After an unidentifiable monster kills a burly contestant during the pilot recording, FTS network executive Jeff Groom hires VIP to protect the other contestants. Val, Quick and Nicky go as undercover bodyguards, monitored by the rest of the team. The killer strikes again, repeatedly. Kay discovers a plausible top-secret explanation. Rob Van Dam guest stars. Guest stars: David Packer as Danny Marks, Kevin Spirtas as Mr. Groom, Michele Kelly as Lydia, Melissa Papp as Cass, Bernard Zilinskas as Rod, Maggie Myatt as Mindy, Gabriella Bern as Ava Rauche, Gerry Anderson as Relic
46	2	"Loh-Down Dirty Shame"	Savage Steve Holland	Steven Kriozere	October 14, 2000
Archaeologist Oliver King (Larry Poindexter) hires Val to promote and guard his museum's latest exposition. It features the newly acquired cursed mask of war lord Jin Doo. Its cult still reveres its mythological powers, but it must be fed live souls. Johnny however is preoccupied with a surprise visit from his Chinese martial arts mentor, Jade. But she has a dark agenda. Guest stars: Karen Kim as Jade, Branden Williams as Dock Worker, Arnold Julian Chon as Bandit, Woon Young Park as Fin, Davee Youngblood as Danny
47	3	"For Val's Eyes Only"	Savage Steve Holland	Tom Abraham & Rick Suvalle	October 21, 2000
VIP is hired to protect philanderer Harris, a party's vice-chairman during its national convention in Beverly Hills. On their way they stumble on and scare-off Shane's goons, thus disturbing even crueler bank-robber Carl Merrick's latest job. His MO matches that of the gangsters who accidentally killed Nicky's father, cop Nickolas Franco, 10 years earlier while robbing the same bank. Guest stars: Don Swayze as Carl Merrick, T.J. Shaboz as Judson, Robin Nance as Remy, Michael Papajohn as Knox, Keith Campbell as Shane, Jack Armstrong as Governor Harris
48	4	"V.I.P., R.I.P."	Jim Charleston	Tom Abraham	October 28, 2000
Only explicitly uninvited Val follows and 'chaperones' Tasha when she gets a CIA 'code 9' (probable suicide mission) from her former boss Wick, to eliminate in Yosemite her former partner Sanders, the last of three undercover agents allegedly gone rogue. They thus stumble upon a New World Order militia. The rest of VIP investigates coffin- and graves-vandalizing graffiti, but finds those probably relate to gambling debts and insurance fraud. Guest stars: Kevin Eubanks as Paul Moss, Alexia Robinson as Clara Moss, Kim Morgan Greene as Ms. Barrows, Jason Hildebrandt as Nick, Robert LaSardo as New World Order Leader, Tom Billett as McNeal
49	5	"Throw Val from the Train"	Savage Steve Holland	Story by : Morgan Gendel & Eric Estrin; Teleplay by : Morgan Gendel	November 4, 2000
A criminal who was supposed to be executed, arranges for his death to be faked and he gets plastic surgery. He boards a train for his next caper. But also on board is Valerie who saw him just before he was supposed to be executed. And when they run into each other Val senses something familiar about him. Guest stars: Shawn Weatherly as Margot Burns, Brian Thompson as Thomas Binford Shaklee, Dean Haglund as Himself, Paul Satterfield as Jason Monroe, Michael Adler as Doctor, John Eric Bentley as Commissioner, Joe Bucaro as Smith, Kevin Fry as Sheriff Teagle, Diana Lupo as Jones, Bruno Marcotulli as Paul the Nudist, Wiley Pickett as Benista, George Brown as Porter
50	6	"Run, Val, Run"	Nelson McCormick	Rick Suvalle	November 11, 2000
Software genius Andy Eagle (Maury Sterling) hires Val as personal protection, fearing for his safety after inventing a revolutionary universal Internet-based operating system. The rest of VIP is hired by cyber billionaire Michael 'spider' Ellins' giant company Spyder Dyne. In fact they're taken hostage to test or sabotage Eagle's invention, which could ruin Spyder Dyne. Guest stars: Shawn Christian as Michael Ellins, Kivi Rogers as Kurtz
51	7	"Magnificent Val"	J. F. Lawton	J. F. Lawton	November 18, 2000
Val wants to protect her favorite Little Tokyo's sushi chef, Fuji, against extortion by Desmond Kusari's Okamura yakuza clan. Fuji, an old samurai descendant, instead accepts a sword duel with Desmond, but his family enlists VIP, so it becomes a group fight. Fuji gets killed, but passes his sword to Val, who thus becomes his clan protector. Fearing her phony fighting reputation, the yakuza hires Japanese champion Hirata The Black, but also posts snipers. Guest stars: Ron Yuan as Hirata The Black, Kenneth Choi as Desmond Kusari, Tak Kubota as Fuji, Aysia Lee as Rena, Tsuyoshi Abe as Yakuza Leader, Jon Valera as Yoshi, Brandi Williams as Herself
52	8	"ExValibur"	Nelson McCormick	Rick Suvalle	November 25, 2000
Johnny discovers his friend Caitlin has joined crazy Tagg's motor bikers gang, the Knights of Chaos who hold jousts in the saddle. Her rich father Jared Kittridge hires VIP to protect or retrieve the brat. Johnny and Val join undercover, which proves dangerous even before discovering their identities inspires Tagg criminally. Guest stars: Henri Lubatti as Tagg, Neal Matarazzo as Jared Kittridge, Natalia Cigliuti as Caitlin Kittridge, Patrick Hancock as Scraps, Monte Perlin as Bruce, Marc P. Shaffer as Jerzy
53	9	"Get Vallery"	Tawnia McKiernan	Robert Bielak	January 13, 2001
VIP's improvisation impresses has-been actress Bobbi Canary, who came to study security guards for Stephen Cannell's new movie project Night of the bodyguard. VIP soon finds out she staged it to trick them into free 'acting' for a cheap movie. But studio boss Peter Stiles also hired real muscle for his own project. Guest stars: Stephanie Zimbalist as Bobbi Canary, Stephen J. Cannell as Himself, Roark Critchlow as Peter Stiles, Jack Kerrigan as Lance Barlow, Brent Sexton as Koster, Mike Gunther as Durbin, David Carrera as Sonny Weber
54	10	"Bodyguards"	Scott Brazil	Norma Safford Vela & Steven Kriozere	January 20, 2001
At the Bodyguard Expo celebrity kidnapping/countering competition, VIP is to take on New York's market leader, Ty Bolander's Hamptons Security. But federal judge Kreiger has hired a goon to find and eliminate an undercover cop, which he extracts from Val's favorite barman, Relic. Both target lists get exchanged during a brawl in Foam, leading to mislead kidnapping. Ray Wise guest stars. Guest stars: Anthony Guidera as Ty Bolander, Gerry Anderson as Relic
55	11	"Val in Space"	Bruce Campbell	Leslie Ray	January 27, 2001
VIP is hired to protect playboy Dex Decker, who enjoys the perks of hero-hood after manning Porter Aerospace's rescue mission for six Russian Cosmonauts. He claims the men are violently demanding that he keep his mouth shut are Russians because he stole some high-tech gizmo 'souvenir' to impress chicks. But Tasha's sexy KGB source puts them on the trace of the goons' real boss- rising space technology tycoon Billy Porter himself. Guest stars: Scott Plank as Dex Decker, Terence Knox as Billy Porter, Christian Svensson as Mick, RuPaul Charles as Pepe Dutille, Gerry Anderson as Relic, Joel Cary Hile as Walzik
56	12	"Val Squared"	Savage Steve Holland	Story by : Morgan Gendel & Steven Kriozere; Teleplay by : Steven Kriozere	February 3, 2001
VIP is hired to protect Kai's dream man, hunky ecologist Dr. Bonzai, who invented a bacterium which eats oil spills. Val however prefers to accept a free spa visit with Maxine. But escaped villain Dr. Tina Stokes and her accomplice Angel recruit an ex-cop Val-lookalike and train her to take Val's place and infiltrate VIP after a make-over. The target is Diablo, a terrible concoction suitable for terrorist purposes, which Banzai's lab reproduced. Guest stars: Angela Harry as Dr. Tina Stokes, John Paul DeJoria as Himself, Jackie Debatin as Angel, Christopher Jacobs as Dr. "Bonzai" Kovacs, Gerry Anderson as Relic, Nynno Ahli as Kristoph, Brendan Ford as Philco
57	13	"Val on Fire"	Bruce Campbell	Steven Kriozere & Mark Yoshimoto Nemcoff	February 10, 2001
VIP attends an LA 'cage wrestling' show of the Laser Lordz, who are former Army special operations mates of Quick, starring Photon and B.J. When someone attacks them, they hire VIP, who participate as a cover. The wrestlers hesitate but ultimately admit it must be their sadistic former drill sergeant Cobler, who became a major and was left alone during their last operation. Guest stars: Dayo Ade as B.J. Finley, Dan Ferro as James Cobler, Jocelyn Seagrave as Patty Del Florio, A.J. Benza as Commentator, Christopher Leps as Dirk, Gail Monian as Jacinda, Tim Sitarz as Nuke, Scott Workman as Dr. Photon, Gerry Anderson as Relic, Robin Coleman as Polaris
58	14	"A.I. Highrise"	Scott Brazil	Steven Kriozere	February 17, 2001
Just after Trans Global International Finance's CEO W. Knight hires VIP to test his ICT genius Dave's new security system KOP in his otherwise empty LA skyscraper, which he wants to put on the rent market, his team is attacked by Nero's men, who inject truth serum, mixed with lethal poison. As Knight explicitly requested Val, she goes with Kay, Quick and Nicky, but also picks up hunky gentleman Klozak, who proves a true white knight. And their budding romantic feelings are the confusing key to distracting KOP's experimental AI. Meanwhile Johhny and Loh get to protect football players Jeremy and Tyrone at a party. They become the target of stealing smugglers. Guest stars: George Takei as KOP's Voice, Taylor Sheridan as Dave, Mark A. Sheppard as Nero, Marcus Schenkenberg as Klozak, Tyrone Hopson as Himself, Jeremy Newberry as Himself, Paul Gutrecht as Wilton Knignt, Kristof Konrad as Vanderwall, Karl Makinen as Gant, Tanjareen Martin as Rand
59	15	"Val in Carnation"	Jack Clements	Leslie Ray	February 24, 2001
At hippie crowd celebrity Zack Henley's party, Maxime starts getting 'memories from a former life' and accuses him of some murder, years ago. Both parties get death threats and hire VIP for protection. After a séance, evidence is found incriminating Zach in the place where his latest mini series is being shot, enough for LAPD detective Grispy to arrest him. Then Maxine changes her 'Déja Voodo' story. Guest stars: Corbin Bernsen as Zack Henley, Engelbert Humperdinck as Himself, Gerry Anderson as Relic, Jeff Ricketts as Randy Pazinski, Javier Grajeda as Detective Grispy
60	16	"Goodfidellas"	Savage Steve Holland	Paul Ruggiero	April 7, 2001
Val hoped to get a job and part opportunities with Jennifer Lopez by providing security at Relic's bar Foam while her people scout for a new LA concert venue. But they discover international Latin American terrorist hit man Manuel Garza was there, sniping businessman Luis Montez, who was recruiting baseball talents Andrian Gonzales and Mark Quinn for his 'dram camp', so Luis becomes VIP's client. He bonds with fellow macho scars-collector Quick, but there arise theories about his true identity. Guest stars: Adrián González as Himself, Mark Quinn as Himself, Reni Santoni as Luis Montez, Mark Bennington as Richards, Timothy Di Pri as Derek, Gerry Anderson as Relic, Joe Ordaz as Garza, Gilbert Rosales as Ramiro
61	17	"Amazon Val"	Peter DeLuise	Tom Abraham	April 14, 2001
Dr. Bob Landesberg (Robert Romanus) has hired VIP to extract and protect Kyle Stamper, who lived for 23 years in the Amazon since boyhood when his parents still lived. His blood contains a rare antigen, which may cure meningitis. They want to donate it to humanity, but the pharmaceutical competition wants that $5 billion market, and hires ruthless hit-man Dolman to get Kyle in LA. Dr. Bob makes some dire discoveries, but a hidden agenda proves even more dangerous. Guest stars: Greg Lauren as Kyle Stamper, Rick Aiello as Dolman, Christophe Schatteman as Himself, Curt Cornelius as Dodge, Morocco Omari as Stewart, Gerry Anderson as Relic
62	18	"Val Under Covers"	Savage Steve Holland	Norma Safford Vela & Rick Suvalle	April 21, 2001
VIP discretely assures the protection of corporate bell ringer Tony Vartebedian, a chemist who is secretly scheduled to expose on Neal Berens's TV show 365 his employer GloMar Petroleum for selling gas they knew to cause cancer risks. Two of his colleagues died from suspicious 'accidents'. So VIP poses as a family renting the house across Tony's suburban home. Val quickly bonds with hunky ecologist neighbor Blake Thompson, but he's not who he says. Tony's boss indeed hired Paco to kill all potential squealers, and a back-up. Guest stars: Steven Bauer as Blake Thompson, Julia Pennington as Peggy Applebaum, George Pilgrim as Tony Vartebedian, Todd McKee as Neal Berens, Danny Arroyo as Paco, Gerry Anderson as Relic, T.J. Shaboz as Judson
63	19	"Aqua Valva"	Nelson McCormick	Morgan Gendel	April 28, 2001
Jimmy Malibu, mob uncle Vittorio Franco's speedboat pilot in the Donzi race, is eliminated by a frogman lurking in the water. Nikki takes his place to score and get the fiends, with VIP watching their back. Enigmatic billionaire Lagos (an acronym) courts Val to visit his giant yacht, actually also the HQ of his international illegal information sales business. The NSA recruits Val to investigate his presumed auctioning of a Chinese spy satellite. Guest stars: David Groh as Don Franco, Alex Carter as Lagos, Todd Tesen as Jimmy Malibu, Wayne Wilderson as Agent Keller, Susan Feniger as Herself, Mary Sue Milliken as Herself, Mark Vanselow as Thomas
64	20	"Molar Ice Cap"	Tawnia McKiernan	Story by : Norma Safford Vela & Tom Abraham; Teleplay by : Tom Abraham	May 5, 2001
A suspicious birthday card pits Tasha on the trail of her ex, dentist Ted McClellan (David Starzyk), who is then seen being attacked by fiends. They're after dental records for a scam planned by Bolivian drug cartel US market baron Simon Pike. So VIP protects Ted, and discovers Tasha's twice ex, the Owl, is also involved. Guest stars: Graham Shiels as Simon Pike, Javier Grajeda as Detective Grispy, Ingo Neuhaus as Shaw, Gerry Anderson as Relic, Kerry Dustin as Lorraine, Todd Bloomer as Snitch, Dan Southworth as Reynaldo, Thomas Kretschmann as The Owl
65	21	"It's Val's Wonderful Life"	Patrick Norris	Story by : Morgan Gendel; Teleplay by : Norma Safford Vela	May 12, 2001
While making an at first sight inoffensive exchange, Val is left on a yacht with a bomb, caught by her stiletto. She's presumed dead, so VIP loses its front star, hence within a month, clients and staff starts to desert to other jobs. Meanwhile Val has amnesia, and gets stranded on a Mexican beach, where simple fishermen take her in. However, revenge is in the making. Guest stars: John Simon Jones as Bostik, Jillian Barberie as Foxy Levin, Julia Vera as Old Mexican Woman, T.J. Shaboz as Judson, Erik Passoja as Pierce, Blake Boyd as Rudman, Gerry Anderson as Relic, Maurice Chasse as Kozoll, Bobby Nish as Mr. Lyndon, D.A.M. Johnson as Charlie, Sam Ayers as Stanley
66	22	"Val's Big Bang"	Savage Steve Holland	Morgan Gendel & Steven Kriozere	May 19, 2001
During Argentina's junta rule in 1951, two Neo-Nazis hide the prototype of a device meant to revive the Third Reich in a booby-trapped cave of Patagonia's extinct Diaquita tribe's lost city Camarena. They accidentally trigger it and die in the explosion. Decades later, an archaeological team digging there hires Nikki as an explosives expert, with VIP to protect the treasures. Ukrainian general Koyla Trofimov is on the trail of the 'hyper-dimensional' device. Tasha and Quick stay home to install Kay's state of the art security system for composer "Weird Al" Yankovic, but Val accidentally took the control device with her. Guest stars: Peter J. Lucas as General Koyla Trofimov, Musetta Vander as Alex Quaid, Peter Franzen as Nazi, Colin Campbell as Vossler, Brad Grunberg as Cretin, Harley Rodriguez as Pedro, Henry M. Kingi Jr. as Commando, Christopher Sayour as Mikhail

=== Season 4 (2001–02) ===
No. overall	No. in season	Title	Directed by	Written by	Original release date
67	1	"21 Val Street"	Savage Steve Holland	Steve Kriozere	September 22, 2001
Val's nosiness ruins Relic's undercover job at an LA college campus as student Todd. The only way to save his investigation into mob king Hans Lamal through his campus drug pusher, Kenny Farmer, is for all VIP to join him in various undercover capacities after catching the mob killer Lamal sent after him which is, in Quick's case, as that hit-man. However Hans's secret identity covers another secret. Guest stars: William Gregory Lee as Kenny Farmer / Hans Lamal, Dana Daurey as Abbey Solomon, Javier Grajeda as Detective Grispy, Gerry Anderson as Relic, Dwayne Macopson as Isaac, Lauren Murry as Jill, Carter Price as Elliott, Drew Powell as Jock
68	2	"Chasing Anna"	J. F. Lawton	Tom Abraham	September 29, 2001
Johnny and Quick become rivals for a dating favor from client Anna Petrov (Ashley Jones), whose parents were killed in a suspicious car crash. It turns out general Volykov, head of the secret police of Kasbayan, is heading a team of killers to eliminate her, as she is the princess/heiress and therefore the last threat to the ruthless regime he defected to when the king was overthrown. Guest stars: David Leisure as DMV Driving Instructor, Timothy V. Murphy as General Volykov, Gerry Anderson as Relic, James Hall as Sentinel, Ilia Volok as Krupin, Nickolai Stoilov as Brevich, Katherine Baker as Alison
69	3	"Holy Val"	Greg Yaitanes	Story by : Morgan Gendel & Leslie Ray; Teleplay by : Eric Estrin	October 6, 2001
VIP is hired by executive secretary Kamin and elder Rygel to protect their 'cosmic' Centaurian cult's treasured 'sacred' meteorite. They successfully ward off an attempt to steal it by internationally wanted master thief Roberto 'Bobby' Perez, who next kidnaps Val, but soon discover the story isn't that simple. Guest stars: Paul Kersey as Kamin, David Gail as Roberto "Bobby" Perez, Spencer Garrett as Rygel, Alisa Reyes as Miranda, Laura McLaughlin as Kaya, Doug Kruse as EV-1 Guy, Marty Papazian as Zinc, Danny Epper as Poole
70	4	"Millennium Man"	Savage Steve Holland	Story by : Steven Kriozere & Leslie Ray; Teleplay by : Steven Kriozere	October 13, 2001
VIP loses Rod Fallon and other Hollywood clients after being publicly outclassed by competitor Adam Fowler's goons. However they discover he drugs them with a pharmaceutical which the company, Dalco, based on Chang Kai Cheq's Purple Legion's bo chi potion but didn't commercialize because of the side-effects. One of them, Trey, turns out to be a former USMC buddy of Nicky, and may already have suffered brain damage. Guest stars: Fredric Lehne as Adam Fowler, Jack Ong as Simon Wing, Lee Sung Hi as Margaret Yi, Rory Leidelmeyer as Trey, Matt Lindquist as Rod Fallon, Jeff Wolfe as Krane, Troy Brenna as Steroidal
71	5	"South By Southwest"	Greg Yaitanes	Morgan Gendel & Steven Kriozere	October 20, 2001
Canadian wrestler Tyler 'Sabretooth' Mane hires VIP to prevent serious harm when loony machos provoke him, hoping to get beaten up by the master. Real danger lurks because FBI agent Darman's team invented a decoy super-agent to smoke out Fallon's Red Coyote terrorist movement, but chance made it look like Tyler is him. He accepts to play along, now closely protected by VIP himself. In the process, he rediscovers himself and reevaluates the sense of his career choices. Guest stars: Tyler Mane as Himself, Tom Schanley as Fallon, Scott Bryce as Agent Darman, Kathleen Kinmont as Agent Madison, Gerald O'Donnell as Voss, Steven Barr as Martin, Elizabeth Alley as Patricia, Doug Kruse as EV-1 Guy, Corey Michael Blake as Moti, Paul Schackman as Hasid, Curtis Lupo as Logan
72	6	"Valzheimer's"	Nelson McCormick	Tom Abraham	October 27, 2001
Dean McGee (Victor Webster) desperately seeks VIP's help, suffering from amnesia after a knock to the head. He's the target of Harman industry's hit-men to prevent him revealing that the revolutionary Jaw Hawk car, which Nikki is to test drive, is a failure. The test is part of the charitable events Val volunteered the team for in the contest to become mayor for a day. Guest stars: J. Downing as Vance Harman, Pepper Sweeney as Seth, Mayor's Aide, Danny Lee Clark as Harman's Henchman, Gerry Anderson as Relic, Carlos Alvarado as Rubén, Terrah Bennett Smith as Sophie, Toby Holguin as Tagger
73	7	"The Uncle From V.A.L."	Greg Yaitanes	Steven Kriozere	November 3, 2001
Val's clumsy, naive uncle Ned Irons (Mark Hamill), who never got beyond administrative work in the Mounties corps he longs to join, accidentally finds a parchment deed which grants an Inuit tribe a large tract in the Yukon. When he 'returns' it to the native crooks gang of Turoc and Ta'eena, they try to eliminate the only witness who can ruin their planned land deal with an oil multinational. Ned escapes to LA, where his favorite niece Val still believes he's a Mountie hero. The crooks follow, and so does Yukon RCMP station sergeant Roarke, who wants to arrest 'rogue deserter' Ned. Guest stars: Eric Scott Woods as RCMP Sergeant Roarke, Ivonne Coll as Ta'eena, Gil Birmingham as Roland, Les Brandt as Turoc, T.J. Shaboz as Judson, Tony Colitti as Trucker, Marci Brickhouse as Young Ta'eena, Brad Koepenick as Bortner, Aimee Garcia as Receptionist, Dennis Madalone as Marco
74	8	"Pen Pal Val"	Jack Clements	Leslie Ray	November 10, 2001
Damian Caine, Val's favorite Cyber author, is released on a technicality in a trial that would have meant jail for arson in the V Club, which killed popular owner Burt Wyler just after he fired Damian, using the MO of his first cyber crime story, Epsilon. VIP believes in his innocence and protects him after someone throws a Molotov cocktail at Damien, which could only have come from another Epsilon chapter. District Attorney Pete Overton, who has senatorial ambitions, is most eager to convict Caine for a new poison murder, which again could have come from Epsilon. Guest stars: Nick Kiriazis as Damian Caine, Steve Wilder as District Attorney Pete Overton, Gerry Anderson as Relic, Gregory Zarian as Hanley, Greg Fitzpatrick as Briggs
75	9	"Kayus Ex Machina"	Tawnie McKiernan	Story by : Rick Suvalle & Lorianne Overton; Teleplay by : Rick Suvalle	November 17, 2001
CIA agent Andrew D Welles (Brian McNamara) decides on his own that a plan to eliminate a Latin American general-dictator, although never approved by Washington, is to be executed anyhow, even if that requires murdering a reluctant colleague. But its finance depends on a dot com front company, which just made major stock holder Kay a small fortune, which she invests mainly in converting her favorite muffin bakery into a cyber café. The secret plans are hidden in its personnel files, which Kay downloads unsuspectingly. The CIA notices that, and Welles wants to eliminate her, assuming her Internet posting meant for the cyber café is an auctioning of the secret plans. Guest stars: Louie Anderson as Homeless Person, Blaque as Themselves, Joseph C. Phillips as Geiger, Nick Spano as Tony Scornovaco Jr., Maz Jobrani as Agent Smith
76	10	"Crouching Tiger, Hidden Val"	Nelson McCormick	Rick Suvalle	November 24, 2001
Johnny is delighted that Hollywood director Jeremy Harmetz has cast him for a low-budget action movie as martial arts actor/stuntman. But the media exposure also discloses his survival to the Hong Kong "Tong" Triad's new LA boss, Morton Zhou, who assumed that he was killed. However Morton's daughter Catherine is kidnapped by mob competitor Jonas Smith, who is out to revenge his own son and steal her part of the Zhou fortune on the side. Guest stars: Robert Torti as Jeremy Harmetz, Yuji Okumoto as Morton Zhou, Linda Kim as Catherine Zhou, Andrew Hawkes as Jonas Simon, Angela Rockwood as Lexi Erikson, Woon Young Park as Wang, Eric Winzenried as Brecker, Vic Chao as Te, James Sie as Restaurant Critic, Michael Papajohn as Dokes, Sam Ayers as Shady Guy, Darryl Chan as Chung, Jim Jarmusch as Himself, Ron Yuan as The Actor
77	11	"Saving Private Irons"	Nelson McCormick	Story by : J. F. Lawton & Tom Abraham; Teleplay by : Leslie Ray & Rick Suvalle	January 19, 2002
Johnny gets dragged along in a no-dating-bet by Quick's clumsy infidelity. Just now Relic asks them to deliver a package to Hollywood producer Nina, whose office and next meeting place abound with scarcely dressed models and nudist part- guests. Nikki's former drill instructor asks the girls to go undercover in his marines' base because someone in the all-female platoon he's training has been stealing explosives and probably plans to kill top-secret prisoner 'Eagle', who turns out to be VIP-enemy Morales. Guest stars: Bobby Hosea as Sergeant Lennox, Sophia Adella Hernandez as Tiegs, Gerry Anderson as Relic, Rosanne Lucarelli as Corbitt, Vanessa Giorgio as M.P. Davis, Bruno Marcotulli as Paul the Nudist, Nadine Ellis as Chandra, Rachel Sterling as Lucious #1, Terri Cadiente as Dunn
78	12	"Diagnosis Val"	Savage Steve Holland	Story by : Leslie Ray & Rick Suvalle; Teleplay by : Leslie Ray	January 26, 2002
A hospital administrator asks VIP to protect Dr. Hank Jonas's (Clive Robertson) patients after two successfully treated botulism victims among them died mysteriously. Relic informs they were lured by fake, infected letters. The team goes undercover in various capacities to investigate the staff. Kay works out the victims were all jury members in the trial against Hank's fiendish brother for a prison murder. But he proves dangerously resourceful. Curtis Armstrong guest stars. Guest stars: Takeo Spikes as Himself, Time Winters as Autopsy Surgeon, Jillian Barberie as Foxy Levin, Gerry Anderson as Relic, Trevor David as Vernon Simms, Soren Hellerup as Dr. Berman, Jean St. James as Nurse Rita Melton, Bob Rumnock as Mr. Abernathy, Nichole Hiltz as Jenna Murphy
79	13	"Val Cubed"	Savage Steve Holland	Steven Kriozere	February 2, 2002
V.I.P. is hired by the Environmental Protection Agency's Arthur Goodwin (Robert Gant) to help transport an experimental Red Coyote terrorist movement weapon to a marine base for destruction. But Val's evil double Joan Archer has escaped from the lunatic asylum, reassembles a gang and kidnaps Val, so she can take her place and abuse the device for revenge on V.I.P. Only Kay gets suspicious. Guest stars: Roma Court as Zara, Roger Ranney as Puck, Christopher Michael as Browdy
80	14	"The K-Files"	Jeff Cadiente	Leslie Ray	February 9, 2002
VIP is hired to protect the Rubicon trade summit after an anonymous terrorist threat letter. The FBI suspects include The Dark hand, which Johnny knows from Hong Kong, so they check on its LA member Miss Ying. Its de facto host and keynote speaker Charles Broder declares on TV to be among a recent wave of 'alien spaceship abductees'. Val insists Kay's bite/branding larks and memory loss 'prove' she is too. New incidents appear to follow both story lines, but what part does Broder's corporate deputy James Gilroy play? Guest stars: Scott Atkinson as Charles Broder, Bailey Chase as James Gilroy, Susie Park as Miss Ying, Doug Kruse as EV-1 Guy
81	15	"48½ Hours"	Jack Clements	Steven Kriozere & Tom Abraham	February 16, 2002
LAPD detective Grispy has another job for VIP, this time formally deputized. They must baby-sit jail-bird Lucy Stanton (Sarah Silverman), who will be remitted provided that she helps track her British ex-boss, international super-crook Nero, who escaped Interpol with a $20,000,000 diamond. Alas Lucy toys around to enjoy her freedom at the taxpayers' expense before actually pointing out Nero's right-hand Mase. Worse, Nero gets wind of the quest and starts killing off anyone connected however vaguely to him. Guest stars: Mark A. Sheppard as Nero, Will Schaub as Peter, Javier Grajeda as Detective Grispy, Gerry Anderson as Relic, Maurice Irvin as Flea, Bergen Williams as Big Sis, Grinnell Morris as Adam, Paolo Nana as Brett, Shazia Pascal as Emma, Ashley Schoff as Sherry, Matteo A. Bof as Himself, Jay Bontatibus as Mase
82	16	"Dude, Where's My Party?"	Greg Yaitanes	Morgan Gendel	February 23, 2002
FBI agent McDonough recruits Val for a patriotic service: testing a new facility's security under Dutch aliases, after 'shopping' for illegal arms and disguises. His secret agenda is to lure the real Red Coyote anarchists. Val picks as infiltration attempt sidekick Maxine, already scheduled as a partner to 'work' at an Erik Estrada party. They are indeed abducted, to be recruited as 'civilian experts', but for a surprising job. Erik Estrada guest stars. Guest stars: Brian Baker as Agent Madyer, Brian Cousins as Blocker, Mailon Rivera as Agent Dawkins, Mo Gallini as Hoag
83	17	"Kiss the Val"	Nelson McCormick	Tom Abraham	April 13, 2002
Pseudo-anarchist techno-master criminal Merrick (Don Swayze) is released from jail. VIP goes after him because Nikki hates her dad's killer unconditionally. However they soon discover he reassembled a gang and that his target is space technology. In fact he kidnapped a scientist's wife for the access codes to control the space shuttle. Guest stars: Kenneth Alan Williams as Dick Roman, Ron Fassler as Daniels, Morgan Brittany as Jeweller, Rachel Bertrand as Tammy Reynolds, Francisco Viana as Roach, Ming Lo as Walters, Simon Brooke as Conklin, Gerry Anderson as Relic, Nicole Stuart as Dr. Faye Nichols, Steve Heinze as Loman, Pete Antico as Harper, Michael Hilow as Urko
84	18	"Miss Con-Jeanie-Ality"	Savage Steve Holland	Norma Safford Vela	April 20, 2002
After crew captain Luke McCain makes a fatal fall at the Miss All Organic rehearsals, VIP is hired to prevent another 'accident' from disturbing the beauty pageant. Next manager Frank Meecham also goes missing until he turns up in the morgue. The team soon goes undercover. Kay discovers both victims also had FBI agent aliases. Yasmine Bleeth and Joyce Brothers guest star. Guest stars: Sam Garnes as Himself, Priscilla Lee Taylor as Elaine, Tim Bagley as Renard Bouvoire, Lisa Stahl-Sullivan as Kelly Vickers, Enya Flack as Mary Hudson, Gerry Anderson as Relic, Manny Suárez as Wilmer, Sharron Leigh as Libby, Rob Elk as Ben, Christopher Leps as Greg, Marc P. Shaffer as Frank Meacham
85	19	"Sunshine Girls"	Savage Steve Holland	Rick Suvalle	April 27, 2002
VIP was hired to protect teacher Jane Percival until her testimony, which should put mob killer William Sikes (Jason Carter) away for good. His team captures Val and Tasha, but instead of classical torture and truth serum make them believe to have aged decades to make them betray the witness's hide-out. Sikes gets so impatient he even kills one of his own scientists. The rest of VIP tries the mob connection. Guest stars: Brandon Douglas as Spencer Burke, Michael Lowry as McLemore, Jillian Barberie as Foxy Levin, Cathy Herd as Jane Percival, Gerry Anderson as Relic, Paco Vela as Dr. Lopez, Glenn Phillips as Tommy "Two-Face" Villani, Candace Kita as Holo-reporter, Michael Prozzo as Denny
86	20	"True Val Story"	Savage Steve Holland	Rick Suvalle & Norma Safford Vela	May 4, 2002
Val is proud as a peacock and happy as a clam now that producer Betsy's TV series plans to do a profile of VIP focusing on her, while the professionals are jealous about having to serve as extras among crooks and menials singing her praise. That and security at a Ducati motorbike model launch show on the beach do not appear to be exciting enough, so 'reenactments' are planned where Val can star. However, recently paroled contract thief Ryan Hill wants to dig up his loot, which are bonds that are about to expire, on that very beach. Guest stars: Margaret Smith as Betsy Goldman, Julie St. Claire as Mona, Jillian Barberie as Foxy Levin, Robert LaSardo as Prison Inmate, Rodney Rowland as Ryan Hill, Gerry Anderson as Relic, T.J. Shaboz as Judson, Oris Erhuero as Saghal, James Bladon as Gary Smith, Michael A. Smith as Mick
87	21	"Val Who Cried Wolf"	Michael Dorn	Story by : Norma Safford Vela; Teleplay by : Steven Kriozere	May 11, 2002
Val's Hollywood idol, stand-up comedian Scott Thayler, famous for the Jimbo character movies, hires VIP after receiving death threats. Randall Waring is indeed hell-bent on extorting him, but Scott, who constantly jokes and lies about everything, keeps their common past hidden even from VIP. Kay meanwhile has various dealings with a fellow Jimbo super-fan. Guest stars: Kirk Ward as Scott "Jimbo" Thayler, Jeffrey Dean Morgan as Randall Waring, Bridget Ann White as Callie, Jack Benza as Benny, Ryan Scott as David
88	22	"Valley Wonka"	Savage Steve Holland	Mark Hamill & Morgan Gendel	May 18, 2002
The heiress of Granny Groshen's (Dorothy Lyman) cookie business posthumously hired VIP for security at her funeral, reading of her will and its execution. She left half of the priceless recipe to son Bernard and daughter Rhonda each. She wants to keep the family business as it is, he to cash a German multinational's $700,000,0000 bid. 'Bernie' is being blackmailed by Yablosnki mob enforcer Rudolph M. Slavin. Williams has the hots for Rhonda, but is in for a nasty surprise, like her and VIP.
