= Swickard =

Swickard is a surname. Notable people with the surname include:

- Charles Swickard (1861–1929), German actor and director
- Josef Swickard (1866–1940), German actor
- Josh Swickard (born 1992), American model and actor
- Lauren Swickard (born 1993), American actress, writer, and producer
