= Kiss the Bride =

Kiss the Bride may refer to:

- "Kiss the Bride" (song), a 1983 single by Elton John from the album Too Low for Zero
- Kiss the Bride (2002), novel by Patricia Cabot
- Kiss the Bride (2002 film), directed by Vanessa Parise
- Kiss the Bride (2007 film), directed by C. Jay Cox, starring Tori Spelling and others
