= Holiday in the Vineyards =

Christmas film by Alex Ranarivelo

- Directed by: Alex Ranarivelo
- Written by: Cecilia Franco; David Zanardi
- Produced by: Ali Afshar; Daniel Aspromonte; Christina Moore
- Starring: Josh Swickard; Sol Rodriguez; Eileen Davidson
- Cinematography: Reuben Steinberg
- Edited by: Brett Hedlund
- Music by: Jamie Christopherson
- Production company: ESX Entertainment
- Distributed by: Netflix
- Release date: December 13, 2023
- Running time: 107 minutes
- Country: United States
- Language: English

Holiday in the Vineyards is a 2023 American Christmas romantic comedy film directed by Alex Ranarivelo and written by Cecilia Franco and David Zanardi. The film stars Josh Swickard, Sol Rodriguez, Eileen Davidson and Omar Gooding. The film was released by Netflix December 13, 2023.

== Cast ==
- Josh Swickard as Carter Baldwyn
- Sol Rodriguez as Valentina Espinoza
- Eileen Davidson as Margo Baldwyn
- Omar Gooding as Moe Walker
- Carly Jibson as Cindy
- Julian Rangel as Fernando Espinoza
- Carlos Solórzano as Santiago Espinoza
- Annika Noelle as Emma Dixon
- Manuel Rafael Lozano as Larry
- Alan Toy as Jay
- Gregory Zarian as Joeffrey
- Paul Witten as William
- Charley Debenedetti as Belinda
- Cullen Douglas as Earl

== Production ==
The film was produced by Ali Afshar and his ESX Entertainment. Josh Swickard, Sol Rodriguez, Eileen Davidson and Omar Gooding was cast in main roles in March 2023. Filming took place in Petaluma, California.

== Reception ==
Liz Kocan from the Decider give the film positive review and praised performances:, wrote in her review: "Holiday in the Vineyards doesn’t really need the hook of the holidays to make it worth your time: it’s a great romantic comedy suitable for any time of year." Carla Hay from the Culture Mix wrote in her review: "“Holiday in the Vineyards” is pleasant and predictable, but not in a way that's cloying or irritating. Unlike many romantic comedies of its kind, everything in the story is believable. Some parts are dull and uneven, but the movie is watchable overall. It's the type of film where most viewers will know how the movie ends before the movie begins, but the movie's characters will keep viewers interested."

The film was Netflix's top 10 film in the global chart upon its release.
