= Steve Shenbaum =

American actor

Steve Shenbaum is a former actor and founder and president of Game on Nation, a communication, leadership, and business consultancy best known for its work with corporations, collegiate, and professional athletes and athletic teams.

== Early life and education ==
Shenbaum grew up in West Covina, California but moved to Chicago, Illinois to attend college at Northwestern University. He graduated from Northwestern with a degree in Theatre and Performance. He later trained at the British American Drama Academy.

== Career ==
=== Game On Nation ===
Shenbaum founded Game On Nation in 1997. In 2003, Game On Nation partnered with IMG Academy and relocated to IMG's Bradenton, Florida campus. The company's partnership with IMG ended in 2012 when game on expanded its presence nationwide, adding clients including the United States military and corporations throughout the country.

== Videography ==
=== Film & Television ===
Year	Title	Role	Notes
1995	Beverly Hills, 90210	Bellman / Room Service Waiter	2 episodes
1996	Married... with Children	Scarecrow	Episode: "Twisted"
1996	Space Jam	Player #2	
1997	Sabrina the Teenage Witch	Ted	Episode: "Sabrina Claus"
1998	Dharma & Greg	Stuart	Episode: "Old Yeller"
1999	EDtv	Jack	
2000	V.I.P.	Graham Henley	Episode: "Val Point Blank"
2000	Opposite Sex	Dan	Episode: "The Virgin Episode"
2001	Crossing Cords	Party Host	Short film
2001	American Pie 2	Counselor	
2002	Big Fat Liar	Tram Guide	
2002	The Third Wheel	Ted	
2003	Scorched	Winston	
