= A California Christmas =

2020 film

- Film poster
- Directed by: Shaun Piccinino
- Written by: Lauren Swickard
- Produced by: Daniel Aspromonte; Ali Afshar; Lauren Swickard
- Starring: Lauren Swickard; Josh Swickard
- Cinematography: Brad Rushing
- Edited by: Brett Hedlund
- Music by: Jamie Christopherson
- Production company: ESX Entertainment
- Release date: December 14, 2020
- Running time: 106 minutes
- Country: United States
- Language: English

A California Christmas is a 2020 Christmas film directed by Shaun Paul Piccinino, written by Lauren Swickard and starring Swickard, Josh Swickard and Amanda Detmer.

Wealthy playboy Joseph, under threat of losing his carefree lifestyle by his mother and CEO of their family's company, is sent to persuade a young, hard-working farmer to sell her family's land before Christmas while posing as a ranch hand.

A sequel, A California Christmas: City Lights was released 16 December 2021.

== Plot ==
Playboy Joseph Van Aston lives a carefree life, as the son of a wealthy San Francisco real estate tycoon. He spends his time womanizing and enjoying his rich lifestyle.

Joseph is sent to Petaluma to close a deal to buy a dairy farm, whose owner has continuously refused a buyout. Callie Bernet is a hardworking and headstrong woman, and her farm is more valuable to her than simply money, despite being heavily in debt. She lives on the ranch with her mother Wendy, who has cancer, and her little sister Hannah.

Joseph arrives at the farm and meets Callie, who is busy with a cow giving birth. He is mistaken for the new ranch hand Manny who is set to arrive soon, so assists Callie with the birth. To gain Callie's trust, despite knowing nothing about farmwork, Joseph poses as Manny.

Meanwhile, Joseph sends his butler Leo to find the real Manny and pay him not to show up at the farm. Manny capitalizes on the situation by making lavish requests in return for his silence. He stays at a luxurious Airbnb with Leo, where they pamper themselves, play video games, and drink fine wine throughout the day. Leo finds that Manny has an uncanny ability to determine every note in the wines. He also provides farming advice to Joseph, who has little idea about the chores.

Over time, Joseph becomes more adept on the farm and grows closer to the Bernets. He and Callie soon develop feelings for each other and she shows him the small abandoned vineyard on the property—left behind by Callie's late father. She occasionally gifts (but does not sell) the previously bottled wine, and they end up sharing part of a bottle.

As Christmas approaches, Joseph attempts to tell Callie the truth about who he is, but never finds the right moment. He also continually ignores his mother's calls. She takes matters into her own hands and comes to the ranch, fully exposing Joseph, and pressures Callie to accept the deal to pay off her mother's extensive medical bills. She refuses the offer and kicks out Joseph, although he stands up to his mother, pleading to help save the ranch.

Leo and Manny taste the ranch's wine from the leftover bottle Joseph had and realize it is one of the best they have ever tasted. The three of them bring the bottle to a prominent sommelier and he agrees on the quality. Joseph goes back to the abandoned vineyard on his own and helps spruce up the area.

Callie finds Joseph working on the vineyard and although still angry at him, works with him to make the vineyard presentable. The sommelier visits the vineyard and ends up purchasing the remainder of Callie's father's wine in the cellar and also leases the existing vines for the future. With the purchase and future commissions from sales, it is enough to keep the ranch in Callie's hands.

Joseph secretly fixes up Callie's old barn and a Christmas / saving-the-ranch celebration takes place, where Callie eventually forgives him and they reconcile. Sometime in the future, Joseph and Callie are sitting on a bench in the now thriving vineyard. Wedding rings are visible on their hands.

== Cast ==
- Lauren Swickard as Callie
- Josh Swickard as Joseph
- Ali Afshar as Leo
- David Del Rio as Manny
- Katelyn Epperly as Liz
- Amanda Detmer as Wendy
- Natalia Mann as Hannah
- Julie Lancaster as Amy
- Gunnar Anderson as Connor
- Aaron Jones as Vincenzo
- Derrica Barbee as Derrica
- Cheyney Steininger as Callie's Dad
- George Kosturos as Liam

== Production ==
Filming took place in Petaluma, California over a three and a half week period and both cast and crew had to follow strict COVID requirements. The film marked Lauren Swickard's production and screenwriting debut.

== Reception ==
A California Christmas has a rating of 60% on Rotten Tomatoes, based on five reviews. Common Sense Media rated the film 3 out of 5 stars. Markos Papadatos of Digital Journal was favorable, stating that overall the film was "a pleasant and heartwarming movie on Netflix."

The film was Netflix's top film in the United States upon its release.

== Sequel ==
Plans for a sequel were announced in December 2020, shortly after the release of the first film. Filming took place during July 2021, once again in Petaluma, and locations included Hermann Sons Hall and Keller Street CoWork. Lauren and Josh Swickard both return for the sequel, along with David Del Rio and Ali Afshar.

The sequel, A California Christmas: City Lights released in December 2021. Markos Papadatos of the Digital Journal was favorable in their review.

== See also ==
- List of Christmas films
