= Picking Up & Dropping Off =

2003 television film

Picking Up & Dropping Off is a television film starring Scott Wolf and Amanda Detmer. It premiered on ABC Family in 2003 on their 25 Days of Christmas programming block.

== Premise ==
A divorced father and a divorced mother start to meet at Denver International Airport when picking up and sending off their children to ex-spouses for holidays.

== Cast ==
- Scott Wolf as Will
- Amanda Detmer as Jane
- Eddie McClintock as Charlie
- Rachelle Lefèvre as Georgia
- Maggie Hill as Claire
