= Brad Rushing =

American cinematographer

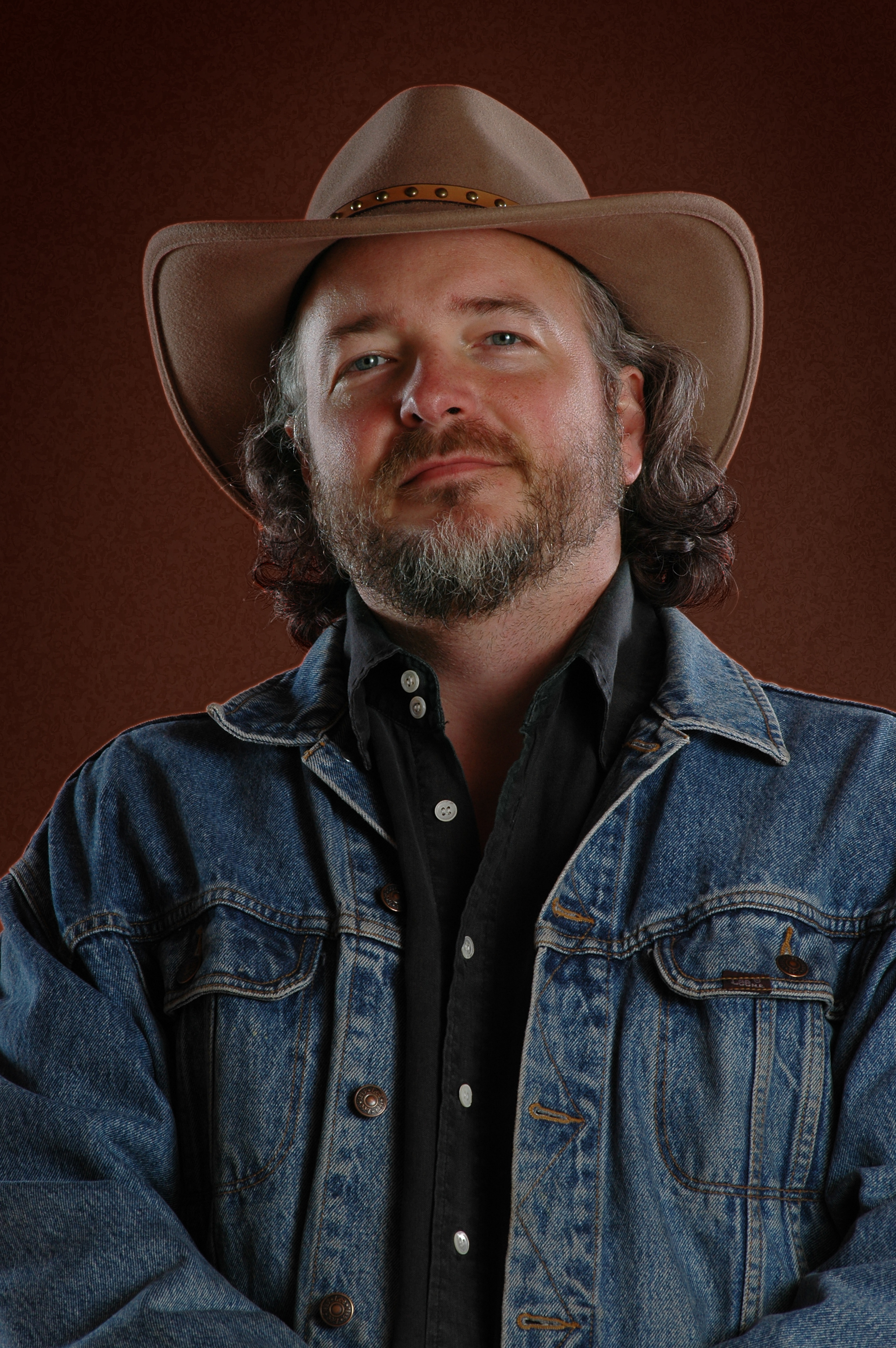
- Born: John Bradley Rushing; Houston, Texas
- Citizenship: United States, Canada
- Occupation: Cinematographer
- Years active: 1988 - Present
- Awards: MTV Video Music Award for Best Cinematography (2002); Canadian Society of Cinematographers Award for Best Music Video Cinematography (2005)
- Website: www.bradrushing.com

John Bradley Rushing is an American cinematographer. Born and raised in Houston, Texas, Rushing is based in Los Angeles, California. The cinematographer of numerous films, commercials, and music videos, his extensive roster of work includes the film Cook County. Rushing won an MTV Video Music Award for Best Cinematography for Moby's "We Are All Made of Stars" in 2002 and a Canadian Society of Cinematographers Award for Best Music Video Cinematography for Alsou's "Always On My Mind" in 2005.

Rushing was the cinematographer of multiple iconic and award-winning music videos, including Toxic by Britney Spears and Without Me by Eminem. More recently, he was the cinematographer for Delerium's "Chrysalis Heart" (featuring Stef Lang), and Romeo Santos and Mario Domm's "Rival". As a prolific director of photography, Rushing has also shot videos for artists including Cash Cash, Sofía Reyes, The Mowgli's, and Placebo.

Rushing was the director of photography for the Netflix original 2020 feature film A California Christmas and its 2021 sequel A California Christmas: City Lights, both of which hit #1 status in the United States and worldwide. Released just two weeks before the end of the year, the former finished 2020 as Netflix's 13th most popular film of the year. Rushing was also the director of photography for two hit Christmas films in 2022: Netflix's That's Amor and Warner Brothers' film Holiday Harmony, the former of which hit #2 for American and worldwide streaming on Netflix, and the latter of which hit #1 on HBO Max.

== Early life ==
John Bradley Rushing was born and raised in Houston, Texas. Accepted into Kinder High School for the Performing and Visual Arts, Rushing studied fine arts and became interested in filmmaking. Rushing majored in fine art, with a minor in film, at the University of Houston. In his junior year at the University of Houston, Rushing left to accept a job in the film industry.

== Career ==
Rushing's commercial and promo work includes the season two promo for Skin Wars, featuring a tiger-striped Rebecca Romijn, and the TBS promo for Earth to America, starring Jack Black. Other commercial clients include McDonald's, NASCAR, Pepsi Light, Pop Tarts, Glad, Geico, Blue Diamond Almonds, and Aguila Beer (for "100 Years").

Rushing was the second unit cinematographer for the Warner Brothers feature film Torque, shooting much of the hit film's visual effects and stunt work.

== Personal life ==
Rushing holds dual citizenship for the United States and Canada. He is a vegetarian.

Rushing is a member of the Canadian Society of Cinematographers, the Visual Effects Society and the Digital Cinema Society.

== Awards and nominations ==
Year	Award	Category	Work	Result	Ref.
2002	MTV Video Music Award	MTV Video Music Award for Best Cinematography	"We Are All Made of Stars" by Moby	Won	
2005	Canadian Society of Cinematographers Award	Best Music Video Cinematography	"Always On My Mind" by Alsou	Won	
2009	Canadian Society of Cinematographers Award	Best Music Video Cinematography	"City of Noise" by The Summerlad	Nominated	
