= Molly Culver =

American actress and model

- Born: Molly E. Culver; July 18, 1968 (age 58); Santa Clara County, California, U.S.
- Occupations: Actress, spokesperson
- Years active: 1998–2015
- Spouse: Clay Cullen
- Children: 1
- Relatives: Peter Cullen (father-in-law)
- Website: www.mollyculver.com

Molly Culver (born July 18, 1968) is a retired American actress and model. She is best known for portraying the role of Tasha Dexter on the syndicated TV series, V.I.P.

== Biography ==
Culver has been a commentator on VH1's I Love the '70s, I Love the '70s: Volume 2, I Love the '80s Strikes Back, I Love the '90s, I Love the '90s: Part Deux, I Love Toys, and I Love the New Millennium as well as the host of Dirt Rider Adventures on OLN. In 1999, she appeared along with Pamela Anderson & Natalie Raitano, her co-stars from V.I.P. on the MTV show Loveline. The co-stars from V.I.P. gave advice on love and romance along with Dr. Drew Pinsky, Adam Carolla & Diane Farr to phone-in callers and members of the live-studio audience.

She is in commercials for the Chase Sapphire credit card, as well as an Olive Garden commercial and an infomercial for 3 Minute Legs.

Molly Culver was the host of the HGTV show All American Handyman, which aired on September 5, 2010. She also had a role as Tia Canning in two episodes of the television series Criminal Minds.

== Filmography ==
Film and television
Year	Title	Role	Notes
1998	Pacific Blue	Frances 'Frankie' Deane	Episode: "With This Ring"
1998–2002	V.I.P.	Tasha Dexter	88 episodes
2002	Warrior Angels	Hunter	
2006	Heist	Rebecca Gordon	3 episodes
2007	Moonlight	The Cleaner	Episode: "Dr. Feelgood"
2009	Contradictions	Jennifer	Video
2009	Pushed	Katherine	TV series
2009	It's Complicated	Adam's Girlfriend in Dream (uncredited)	
2010	The Pack	Farrell	
2012	Smoking/Non-Smoking	Farrell	
2014–2015	Criminal Minds	SSA Tia Canning	Episodes: "Gabby", "The Hunt"
