= Jack and Jill vs. the World =

- Movie Poster
- Directed by: Vanessa Parise
- Written by: Vanessa Parise; Peter Stebbings
- Produced by: Robin Dunne; Vanessa Parise
- Starring: Freddie Prinze Jr. Taryn Manning; Robert Forster; Vanessa Parise; Kelly Rowan; Peter Stebbings
- Cinematography: Manfred Guthie
- Edited by: Matthew Boothe; Gareth C. Scales
- Music by: Jeremy Parise
- Release date: April 4, 2008
- Running time: 89 minutes
- Countries: United States; Canada
- Language: English

Jack and Jill vs. the World is an American-Canadian film by Vanessa Parise. It was released on April 4, 2008 and stars Freddie Prinze Jr. and Taryn Manning as Jack and Jill.

== Plot ==
Jack is a successful thirty-something NYC advertising executive, living a life of routine. He meets Jill by chance on a rooftop. She is looking for an apartment and asks him for directions. Jack suggests Jill's name for an ad shoot.

Later, when he drives Jill to her apartment he realizes the neighborhood does not look safe. So he helps her move out of her place and into his spare bedroom.

Meanwhile, Jack's best friend and business partner George continually tries to set him up with available women he knows, all of whom similarly show a keen interest in settling down and having children.

As time goes on, Jill opens Jack's eyes in many ways, including fair trade coffee. She gets a job at a pet shelter and is taught to screen potential adopters. Over lunch with her new coworker Lucy, after being asked how she can eat so much yet not gain weight, Jill confesses she has cystic fibrosis so her body doesn't absorb nutrients well.

After Jack and Jill sleep together, initially in the morning he insists it was a one-off thing so they can remain roommates. However, her affectionate nature soon wins him over, and they resume being intimate.

Jill's free-spirited nature causes some friction, however. She spends an evening away without forewarning, which worries him. It goes unexplained, but after the pair climb a tree they piece together a playful manifesto of "rules to live by."
Rule 1 Be honest
Rule 2 Believe in fairy tales
Rule 3 Accept time as our friend
Rule 4 Make sure the nookie is good
Rule 5 Promote beauty. Wage a sustained campaign against ugliness
Rule 6 Abandon the pursuit of happiness and its false promise
Rule 7 Show compassion, except to pirates
Rule 8 Less TV
Rule 9 Always be willing to admit when you're wrong

George, noticing a more playful side to Jack's usual cynicism, wants to meet Jill, the cause. Jack periodically brings lunch to have with his dad Norm at his bookshop. So, he brings Lucy there so they can meet.

When her long absences go unexplained, Jack forces her to confess that her disappearances are a result of the treatment she needs for cystic fibrosis, an ultimately terminal illness. Jack is furious with Jill for violating their pact of honesty, they break up and she moves in with Lucy.

A talk with his father Norman incites Jack to find Jill. He first goes to the clinic where she gets her treatments, then tracks down her wacky friend Lucy at the animal shelter and pleads his case. Convinced that he truly loves Jill, Lucy reveals that she is catching a Greyhound bus cross-country to Hollywood. Jack hurries to Port Authority, but doesn't catch her.

Jack reevaluates his life, and just after he asks to be fired from his job, a bomb threat is called in at his work. He goes outside and George tells him that the threat was called in by someone who wants to fight ugliness. Jack realizes that the culprit has to be Jill.

Jack finds Jill nearby, they make up as he includes the last point of the manifesto, and with their new dog Lucy got him to adopt in tow, they hit the highway with no destination in sight except for a life together.

== Cast ==
- Freddie Prinze Jr. as Jack
- Taryn Manning as Jill
- Robert Forster as Norman
- Vanessa Parise as Lucy
- Kelly Rowan as Kate
- Peter Stebbings as George
- Ingrid Doucet as Sally
- Lisa Ciara as Amberly
- Darrin Brown as T-Bone
- Claudia Besso as Melony
- Krista Sutton as Emily
- Julian Richings as Mr. Smith
- Ethan Penner as Wyatt
- Hannah Lochner as Holly
- Charles Martin Smith as Carlin

== Reception ==
The film garnered a mixed reception from critics. According to Reel Film reviews it "ultimately establishes itself as an affable endeavor that benefits substantially from the charismatic work of its two leads." But Robert Abele of the Los Angeles Times concluded that it is "Blind to the fact that it should be rising up against its own formulaic kind."

== Music ==
The soundtrack features music by Canadian indie rock band Stars.

== Home media ==
The film was released to DVD on June 14, 2008.
