= A California Christmas: City Lights =

2021 Christmas film

- Promotional poster
- Directed by: Shaun Piccinino
- Written by: Lauren Swickard
- Produced by: Daniel Aspromonte; Ali Afshar; Lauren Swickard
- Starring: Lauren Swickard; Josh Swickard; Amanda Detmer
- Cinematography: Brad Rushing
- Edited by: Brett Hedlund
- Music by: Jamie Christopherson
- Production company: ESX Entertainment
- Distributed by: Netflix
- Release date: December 16, 2021
- Running time: 90 minutes
- Country: United States
- Language: English

A California Christmas: City Lights is a 2021 American Christmas romantic comedy film created for Netflix, directed by Shaun Paul Piccinino, written by Lauren Swickard and starring Lauren Swickard, Josh Swickard and Amanda Detmer. It's a sequel to the 2020 film A California Christmas.

Its story follows Callie and Joseph who one year after falling in love are now running a dairy farm and winery, however business and family obligations threaten their relationship as Joseph is called back to the city.

The film was released on Netflix on December 16, 2021.

== Plot ==
One year after the previous film, Callie and Joseph are still on the farm. There he proposes, and she accepts. That evening, everyone celebrates the engagement, and his chauffeur, Leo, insists that the city misses Joseph, which he finds hard to believe.

The following morning, Joseph finds out his mother ran off with her yoga instructor and has left the company to him, much to his dismay. After finding out a woman named Victoria has been appointed temporary CEO, Joseph is concerned as she is unsuitable. Joseph's mother explains she was inspired by Callie and Joseph's love to find her own.

Brandy, Callie's best friend and maid of honour, comes to visit Callie earlier than expected after hearing about her engagement to Joseph, but mistakes Manny for her fiancé, much to his confusion. Callie introduces Joseph as her fiancé to Brandy, making things slightly awkward. Later, Joseph tells her he must head back to San Francisco for a while and asks her to come along. Callie agrees, leaving Manny and Brandy to look after Hannah and the farm.

In San Francisco, Callie starts to enjoy the city and later that evening at a hotel, Callie is introduced to Victoria, who tells her she can help her as needed. Joseph's mother booked a wedding venue for them when she found out he was going to propose. Joseph tells Callie that the date has been set for Christmas Eve, much to her shock as they have not been engaged very long, but she says she will think about it.

Meanwhile, on the farm, Manny develops a crush on Brandy.

Back at the city after speaking to Brandy, Callie agrees to get married on Christmas Eve. She and Joseph attend a party where she is overwhelmed by all the people but still enjoys herself. Back on the farm, Manny and Brandy bond over a video game and almost kiss before they stop themselves. The following morning, she kisses him.

In San Francisco, Joseph struggles with being the CEO of his troubled family company and Callie helps out with ideas to make it successful. She starts to adapt to the city as she and Joseph plan their wedding. Manny and Brandy start to date as she gets closer to Callie's sister Hannah.

Callie confronts Joseph after she feels that he is getting too attached to his old life as CEO of his dad's company. And Hannah is upset that Callie has not contacted her, so Manny comforts and cheers her up. Callie spends time with Owen at a soup kitchen which has lost much of its funding, which came from Joseph's company. Callie helps him in his play at the soup kitchen where he plays Joseph, as he needs a Mary at the last minute. Joseph and Callie have a fight about the wedding due to Victoria, and she hands back the ring.

Back on the farm, Manny confesses his love for Brandy, which she reciprocates. Callie is picked up by her and they talk about Joseph. Brandy reminds her that he left his city life behind for a year because he loves her. Joseph speaks to Leo, who stops him from throwing away the engagement ring.

Back on the farm, Hannah is distant with Callie as she is still upset about her being unreachable in San Francisco. Manny and Brandy tell Callie they are dating, which she is overjoyed about. The sisters reconcile. Joseph speaks to his mother, who convinces him to do the right thing, while Callie visits her mother's grave.

Joseph cancels the gala and reconciles with Callie, who still wants to marry him, and he makes peace with his ex-fiancée. Joseph resumes funding Owen's soup kitchen. Callie and Joseph marry at the vineyard, with flashbacks of their relationship. The film ends nine months later when Callie is in labor.

== Cast ==
- Lauren Swickard as Callie
- Josh Swickard as Joseph
- Amanda Detmer as Wendy
- David Del Rio as Manny
- Ali Afshar as Leo
- Laura James as Victoria
- Emelia Hartford as Lindsey
- Julie Lancaster as Ms. Van Aston
- Daniel Booko as Kirk
- Gunnar Anderson as Connor
- Natalia Mann as Hannah
- Katelyn Epperly as Liz
- Noah James as Owen
- Shaun Paul Piccinino as Veterinarian
- Riley Dandy as Tiffany
- Kane Lim as Kane Kim
- Raquel Dominguez as Brandy
- Elise Berggreen as Lily
- Tony Panterra as Rogelio
- Bethany Walls as Ainsley 'Mother Mary'
- Derrica Barbee as Derrica
- James Markham Hall Jr. as Jaren
- Rayana Ragan as Gina
- Cindy Wade Kelly as Homeless Woman
- Johnny Afshar as Sergio
- Will Dao as Harry

== Production ==
In December 2020, it was reported that the sequel to A California Christmas had entered a pre-production, and would begin filming in 2021. In addition to Petaluma, California, the city where the original was filmed, parts of the film were also shot in San Francisco.

== Reception ==
=== Critical reception ===
John Serba of Decider was critical of the film's dialogue and plot, calling it "cornball holiday schmaltz" and comparing it negatively to Hallmark Christmas movies. Jennifer Green of Common Sense Media gave the film 3 out of 5 stars, concluding that it was "easy to watch" but rehashed much of the previous film. Markos Papadatos of Digital Journal gave the film four out of five stars, praising its script, direction and cast.

=== Audience viewership ===
In its opening week, the film logged 22.8 million viewing hours and reached Netflix's Top 10 list in 73 countries around the world.

== See also ==
- List of Christmas films
