= Amanda Detmer =

American actress

- Education: California State University, Chico (BA); New York University (MFA)
- Occupation: Actress
- Years active: 1995–present
- Spouse: Raymond Resendez (m. 2009)

Amanda Detmer is an American actress. She made her big screen debut playing Miss Minneapolis in 1999 comedy film Drop Dead Gorgeous, and later had a supporting role in Final Destination.

In the early 2000s, Detmer had starring roles in comedy films, including Boys and Girls (2000), Saving Silverman (2001), The Majestic (2001), and Kiss the Bride (2002). She has had starring roles in short-lived television series, such as A.U.S.A. (2003) and What About Brian (2006–07).

== Early life ==
Amanda Detmer and her family moved to Chico, California when she was in primary school. Her mother, Susan (née Thurmon), is a teacher, and her father, Melvin Lester Detmer, is a singing cowboy. She attended California State University, Chico for her undergraduate education and completed her Master of Fine Arts from New York University Tisch School of the Arts before embarking on a career in show business.

== Career ==
Detmer made her onscreen debut in 1995 with the television movie Stolen Innocence, and her big-screen debut playing Miss Minneapolis in the beauty pageant-set comedy Drop Dead Gorgeous (1999). In 2000, she appeared as Terry Chaney in the supernatural horror film Final Destination and in the romantic comedy Boys and Girls alongside Freddie Prinze Jr., Jason Biggs and Claire Forlani. The following year, Detmer had major roles in comedy film Saving Silverman with Jason Biggs and romantic comedy-drama The Majestic, directed and produced by Frank Darabont, starring opposite Jim Carrey. She appeared in the cover of Stuff the same year.

In 2002, Detmer had her first star-billed role in the Metro-Goldwyn-Mayer romantic comedy Kiss the Bride. She also had supporting roles in Big Fat Liar (2002) and You, Me and Dupree (2006).

On television, Detmer was regular cast member on the two short-lived NBC sitcoms, M.Y.O.B. (2000) starring Lauren Graham, and A.U.S.A. (2003) opposite Scott Foley. From 2006 to 2007, she starred in the ABC comedy-drama What About Brian alongside Barry Watson, Sarah Lancaster and Rosanna Arquette. In 2009, she had a recurring role in the ABC medical drama Private Practice. From 2011 to 2012, she co-starred in another ABC series, the short-lived sitcom Man Up!. From 2011 to 2013, Detmer also had a recurring role in USA Network drama series Necessary Roughness. She also guest-starred on Law & Order: Criminal Intent, The Vampire Diaries, The Mentalist and Two and a Half Men. In 2017, Detmer was cast in the unaired television pilot for Red Blooded, for a series meant to star Reba McEntire, which ABC passed on.

== Filmography ==
=== Film ===
| Year | Title | Role | Notes |
|---|---|---|---|
| 1999 | Drop Dead Gorgeous | Miss Minneapolis | |
| 1999 | A Little Inside | Sarah Parker | |
| 2000 | Final Destination | Terry Chaney | |
| 2000 | Boys and Girls | Amy | |
| 2001 | Saving Silverman | Sandy Perkus | |
| 2001 | The Majestic | Sandra Sinclair | |
| 2002 | Big Fat Liar | Monty Kirkham | |
| 2002 | Last Seen | Jennifer Langson | |
| 2002 | Kiss the Bride | Danisa "Danni" Sposato | |
| 2003 | Patching Cabbage | Rhonda | Short film |
| 2004 | Portrait | Esther | Short film |
| 2005 | Lucky 13 | Amy | |
| 2005 | Extreme Dating | Lindsay Culver | |
| 2006 | Final Move | Amy Marlowe | |
| 2006 | Jam | Amy | |
| 2006 | You, Me and Dupree | Annie | |
| 2008 | American Crude | Olivia | |
| 2008 | AmericanEast | Kate | |
| 2011 | Shape | Joi | Short film |
| 2012 | For Spacious Sky | Meg | Short film |
| 2015 | Lethal Seduction | Tanya Richards | |
| 2015 | The Week | Jessie Briggs | |
| 2016 | Baseball and the Ballerina | Sarah Parker | |
| 2017 | Pure Country: Pure Heart | Elizabeth Spencer | |
| 2020 | Lady Driver | Loretta | |
| 2020 | A California Christmas | Wendy Bernet | |
| 2021 | A California Christmas: City Lights | Wendy Bernet | |

=== Television ===
| Year | Title | Role | Notes |
|---|---|---|---|
| 1995 | Stolen Innocence | Dannie Baldwin | TV movie |
| 1999 | To Serve and Protect | Tyler Harris-Carr | 2 episodes |
| 1999 | Ryan Caulfield: Year One | Casey | 2 episodes |
| 2000 | M.Y.O.B. | Lisa Overbeck | Main cast (4 episodes) |
| 2003 | A.U.S.A. | Susan Rakoff | Main cast (8 episodes) |
| 2003 | Sue Thomas: F.B.Eye | Wedding Guest | Episode: "The Fugitive" |
| 2003 | Miss Match | Gabrielle Davis | Episode: "I Got You Babe" |
| 2003 | Picking Up & Dropping Off | Jane | TV movie |
| 2004 | Weekends | Carolyn McIntyre | TV movie |
| 2004 | CSI: Miami | Ms. Mancini | Episode: "Murder in a Flash" |
| 2006 | Proof of Lies | Christine Hartley | TV movie |
| 2006–2007 | What About Brian | Deena Greco | Main cast (24 episodes) |
| 2007 | 1321 Clover | Sharon Tuttle | TV movie |
| 2007 | Law & Order: Criminal Intent | Tammy Mills | Episode: "Lonelyville" |
| 2008 | Single with Parents | Sasha | TV movie |
| 2008 | Psych | Ciaobella | Episode: "Black and Tan: A Crime of Fashion" |
| 2009 | Medium | Sarah | Episode: "All in the Family" |
| 2009 | Private Practice | Morgan Gellman | 5 episodes |
| 2010 | The Vampire Diaries | Trudie Peterson | Episode: "A Few Good Men" |
| 2011 | Man Up! | Brenda Hayden | Main cast (13 episodes) |
| 2011–2013 | Necessary Roughness | Jeannette Fiero | 11 episodes |
| 2012 | The Exes | Jill | Episode: "Sister Act" |
| 2012 | The Mentalist | Nicola Karlsen | Episode: "The Crimson Ticket" |
| 2013 | Two and a Half Men | Meghan | Episode: "My Bodacious Vidalia" |
| 2014 | Baby Daddy | Margot | 2 episodes |
| 2014 | Sea of Fire | Adine McAllister | TV movie |
| 2015 | Battle Creek | Lydia Conrad | Episode: "Homecoming" |
| 2015 | Lethal Seduction | Tanya | TV movie |
| 2016 | Second Chance | Helen Pritchard | 8 episodes |
| 2016 | The Night Shift | Katherine Santiago | Episode: "Unexpected" |
| 2017 | Red Blooded | Randa Post | Unaired pilot |
| 2018-2019 | Empire | Tracy Kingsley | 14 episodes |
| 2019 | Family Reunion | Haven Sheeks | Episode: "Remember Macho Mazzi?" |
| 2021 | NCIS | Christine Bodizinski | Episode: "Misconduct" |
