= Game on Nation =

American business consultancy

game on Nation
- Type: Private Raaz MP3
- Industry: Communication Training; Business Consulting; Leadership Development
- Founded: 1997
- Founder: Steve Shenbaum
- Headquarters: Bradenton, Florida
- Key people: Steve Shenbaum, CEO; Blair Bloomston
- Services: Communication Training Leadership Development, Media Training
- Website: gameonnation.com

game on Nation is a communication, leadership, teambuilding and business consultancy, which is best known for its work with corporations, professional and collegiate athletes and athletic teams. game on Nation clients include the New York Yankees, Pittsburgh Pirates, University of Alabama football, Kentucky Wildcats, the United States women's national soccer team, Pete Sampras, Alex Smith, Greg Oden the Air Force Special Operations Command and the United Services Organization (USO). game on Nation was founded in 1997 by Steve Shenbaum. Shenbaum serves as game on Nation’s CEO.

game on Nation was also featured in Two Days in April and ESPN’s Outside the Lines.

== History ==
game on Nation was founded in 1997 as game on Media. game on’s first client was Pete Sampras, who game on co-founder Steve Shenbaum met through a former Northwestern University classmate. Shenbaum originally came up with the idea of a communication consultancy firm focused on media training for athletes in 1992, when he worked with Chicago, Illinois-based athletes such as Jim Harbaugh and Scottie Pippen on the set of WGN-TV show Energy Express.

In 2003, game on Nation partnered with IMG Academy and moved its headquarters to IMG’s Bradenton, Florida campus. During their partnership with IMG, game on Nation trained the academy’s students while continuing to work with corporations, athletes and teams outside of IMG Academy. game on Nation left the IMG Academy in 2012 and expanded its client base to include more corporations and businesses and the United States Armed Forces.

== Curriculum ==
game on Nation uses a proprietary curriculum of interactive drills and improvisation-based games and exercises.
