= David Del Rio =

American actor, director, and producer

- Born: September 29, 1987 (age 38); Miami, Florida, U.S.
- Other name: David Rio
- Occupation: Actor
- Years active: 2006–present
- Spouse: Katherine Del Rio
- Children: 2

David Del Rio (born September 29, 1987) is an American actor, director, and producer who has appeared in films and live productions such as Pitch Perfect and Grease Live!, and has previously directed several short films.

== Early life and education ==
Del Rio was born in 1987 in Miami, Florida. He graduated from New World School of the Arts in Miami, Florida, in 2006, and in 2009, graduated from the New York Conservatory for Dramatic Arts, School of Film and Television.

== Career ==
Del Rio and his wife Katherine opened the production company Theater Row Productions in, producing its first feature The Big Feed.

In March 2023, he was cast as Billy Martinez, a first-year lawyer, in CBS's Matlock. On October 2, 2025, Del Rio's co-star Leah Lewis accused Del Rio of sexual assault; Del Rio was fired and escorted off the set that day.

== Filmography ==
Film

Year	Title	Role	Notes
2012	Pitch Perfect	Kolio	
2015	Spare Parts	Cristian Arcega	
2015	The Half of It	Geoffrey	Short film
2016	The Belko Experiment	Roberto Jerez	
2016	Undrafted	Tree	Short film
2020	A California Christmas	Manny	
2021	A California Christmas: City Lights	Manny	

Television

Year	Title	Role	Notes
2008	Law & Order: Special Victims Unit	Freddie Ramirez	1 episode
2009–2011	The Troop	Felix	29 episodes
2011	Geek Charming	Ari	Disney Channel Original Movie
2015	Resident Advisors	Ian	Recurring
2016	Grease: Live	Putzie	
2019	Search and Destroy	Dustin	
2019–2021	Movie Trivia Schmoedown	"Diamond" Dave Del Rio	
2020	The Baker and the Beauty	Mateo Garcia	9 episodes
2021	The Good Doctor	Ben	1 episode
2022	Maggie	Ben	13 episodes
2024–2025	Matlock	Billy Martinez	Main role
