= Vanessa Parise =

American director, writer, and producer

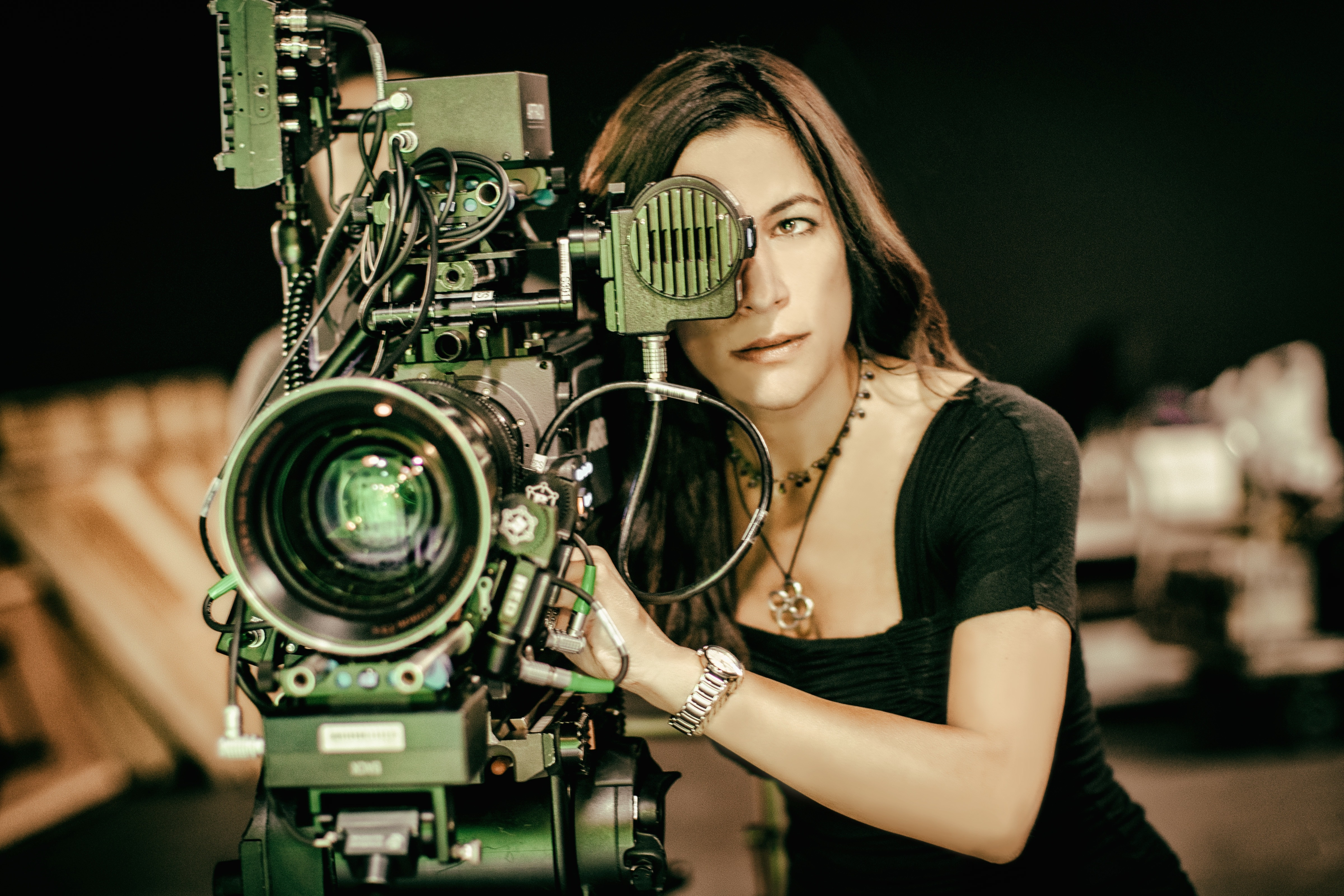

Vanessa Parise is an American film director, writer, producer, and actress based in New York City. Her first feature film Kiss the Bride won the Golden Starfish Award at the Hamptons Film Festival in 2002. Her television movies, Perfect High and Drink Slay Love have been named by the Lifetime’s Broad Focus initiative. Parise has been nominated for Leo Awards for Best Direction for Lighthouse in 2015, for Perfect High in 2016, for Beyond in 2018, and for The Simone Biles Story in 2019. Her television movie The Simone Biles Story was nominated for Best Television Movie and Best Lead Actress by the NAACP Awards in 2019.

== Early life ==
Born in New York City and raised in Rhode Island, Parise ended her pursuit of a medical degree at Harvard Medical School to venture into the business as actor/writer/director/producer. on the feature film Kiss the Bride, starring Parise and Alyssa Milano.

== Career ==
Parise ended her pursuit of a medical degree at Harvard Medical School to venture into the business as actor/writer/director/producer on the feature film Kiss the Bride. Parise followed this with the film Jack and Jill vs the World which raised money for the Cystic Fibrosis Foundation and then enjoyed a limited theatrical release. She has directed the television movies "The Unauthorized Beverly Hills 90210 Story", "Perfect High", and "Status Unknown". As a writer, she has sold multiple spec features including BFF. Parise sold the pilot script The New Twenty to Freeform.

Parise is the co-executive producer and directing producer on The Flash and she was the co-executive producer and directing producer on Charmed. She directed the Tim Kring series Beyond, for which she was nominated for a Leo Award for Best Direction in 2018, and episodes of the Amazon series Just Add Magic. She also directed the series Andi Mack.

== Nominations and honors ==
Parise received a 2019 Leo Award Win for Best Direction of "Simone Biles: Courage to Soar," a 2016 Leo Award nomination for Best Direction of Perfect High and a 2015 Leo award nomination for Best Direction of #POPFAN. She was named by Lifetime with their Broad Focus Top 5 Original Movies 2015, and by SheKnows as one of Ten Female Directors Breaking Stereotypes in 2014. Her film Kiss the Bride won the Hamptons Film Festival’s Golden Starfish Award for Best Feature. At Cinequest, she won the Director’s Award. She also won the Excellence In Filmmaking Award at Sarasota, Best Actress, and Best Score at Montecarlo, and Best Feature at RIFF.

== Filmography ==
2024	Grey's Anatomy	Director	Series, ABC
2021–2023	The Flash	Co-Executive Producer/Director (multiples)	Series, The CW
2020-2022	Firefly Lane	Director (multiples)	Series, Netflix
2020	The Good Doctor	Director	Series, ABC
2020	The Resident	Director	Series, FOX
2020	Chicago Med	Director	Series, NBC
2019	Runaways	Series, Hulu	
2018	Charmed	Co-Executive Producer/Director (multiples)	Series, The CW
2018	BFF	Co-Writer	Feature Film, Raindancer
The Simone Biles Story: Courage to Soar	Director	Feature Film, Lifetime	
2017	Beyond	Director	Series, Freeform
2017	Drink Slay Love	Director	Pilot (BD), Lifetime
2016	Andi Mack	Director	Series, Disney Channel
2016	Straight As	Director	MOW, Lifetime
2016	Just Add Magic	Director (multiples)	Series, Amazon
2016	Project Mc^{2}	Director (multiples)	Series, Netflix
2015	Beverly Hills 90210 Story	Director	MOW, Lifetime
2015	Perfect High	Director	MOW, Lifetime
2014	#Popfan	Director	MOW, Lifetime
2014	Demo Girl	Writer	Feature Film, Up
2014	When Calls the Heart	Writer	Series, Hallmark
2013	The Wedding Chapel	Director	MOW, NGN
2013	Status Unknown	Director	MOW, Lifetime
2013	Coming Home for Christmas	Director	MOW, NGN
2012	Shape	Writer	Pilot, Tricon
2009	On Set On Edge	Director	Web Series, Warner Bros
2008	Jack & Jill vs The World	Writer/Director	Feature Film, MGM
2003	Kiss the Bride	Writer/Director	Feature Film, MGM
