= Boys and Girls (2000 film) =

2000 American film by Robert Iscove

- Theatrical release poster
- Directed by: Robert Iscove
- Written by: Andrew Lowery; Andrew Miller (credited as "The Drews")
- Produced by: Jay Cohen; Lee Gottsegen; Murray Schisgal
- Starring: Freddie Prinze Jr.; Claire Forlani; Jason Biggs; Amanda Detmer
- Cinematography: Ralf D. Bode
- Edited by: Casey O. Rohrs
- Music by: Stewart Copeland
- Production company: Dimension Films
- Distributed by: Miramax Films
- Release date: June 16, 2000
- Running time: 94 minutes
- Country: United States
- Language: English
- Budget: $30 million
- Box office: $25.8 million

Boys and Girls is a 2000 American romantic comedy film directed by Robert Iscove and starring Freddie Prinze Jr., Claire Forlani, Jason Biggs, and Amanda Detmer. The film follows Ryan (Prinze) and Jennifer (Forlani), who meet each other initially as adolescents, and later realize that their lives are intertwined through fate.

Andrew Lowrey and Andrew Miller's script for Boys and Girls was purchased by Miramax Films, and Iscove and the principal cast was attached to the project shortly after. Anna Friel was originally set to star in the role of Jennifer but backed out shortly before filming began due to "creative differences". She was replaced by Forlani.

Released theatrically in the United States by Miramax Films on June 16, 2000, Boys and Girls received generally negative reviews from critics and was a box office bomb, grossing only $25.8 million worldwide against a $30 million budget.

== Plot ==
12-year-olds Jennifer Burrows and Ryan Walker meet aboard an airplane and are immediately at odds. Four years later, Ryan is the mascot at his high school in Los Angeles, while Jennifer is elected Homecoming Queen at hers. During the halftime ceremony between their two schools, he is chased by the rival mascot and loses his mascot head, only to find it run over by her ceremonial car. Jennifer later finds Ryan and tries to console him about his costume. They part ways once more, realizing they are too different from each other.

One year later, Ryan and Jennifer are students at UC Berkeley. He is in a steady relationship with his high school sweetheart Betty, and Jennifer is living with a musician. Ryan and Betty break up after realizing their differences. He meets his roommate Hunter, whose real name is Steve, a self-described ladies' man with numerous elaborate—and unsuccessful—ploys for seducing women.

Jennifer moves in with her best friend Amy after she and her boyfriend break up. Ryan and Amy start going out, and he renews his friendship with Jennifer, even after she is tasked by Amy to break up with him. They take walks, console each other over break-ups, and gradually become best friends. Jennifer even talks Ryan into dating again, he starts seeing a girl named Megan.

One night, in a cynical mood towards love, Jennifer breaks down, and Ryan tries to console her. To their equal surprise, they have sex. Ryan breaks up with Megan. Afraid of commitment, Jennifer insists sleeping together was a mistake and that they should pretend it never happened. Hurt and heart-broken, Ryan ghosts her, withdrawing into his studies.

As months pass, Jennifer graduates and readies herself to travel to Italy. She encounters Ryan, whom she has not seen since the day after their night together, at a hilltop overlooking the Golden Gate Bridge. Ryan confesses his feelings to her, but she insists the feeling are not mutual. He wishes her well in Italy and leaves.

On the shuttle to the airport, Jennifer passes the same hilltop where they used to spend time together and realizes that she wants to be with Ryan. She immediately races back to her apartment and finds Amy frantically getting dressed to greet her. Steve confidently strolls out of Amy's bedroom and tells Jennifer that Ryan is flying back to Los Angeles.

While waiting for departure, Ryan hears Jennifer confess her love for him in Latin. After some convincing, and feeling the wrath of a flight attendant, they rekindle their romance where they first met--on an airplane.

== Cast ==
- Freddie Prinze Jr. as Ryan Walker
  - Brendon Ryan Barrett as young Ryan
- Claire Forlani as Jennifer Burrows
  - Raquel Beaudene as young Jennifer
- Jason Biggs as Hunter / Steve
- Amanda Detmer as Amy
- Alyson Hannigan as Betty
- Monica Arnold as Katie
- Heather Donahue as Megan
- Lisa Eichhorn as Shuttle Passenger
- Matt Schulze as Paul
- Gay Thomas as N.Y. Flight Attendant
- Tim Griffin as Timmy
- Brian Poth as Guy in Diner
- Lee Garlington as L.A. Flight Attendant
- Susan Kellermann as Therapist
- Kylie Bax as Supermodel
- Kristy Hinze as Supermodel
- Ines Rivero as Supermodel
- Renate Verbaan as Supermodel
- Carrie Ann Inaba as Dancer
- Diane Mizota as Dancer
- Nancy O'Meara as Dancer
- Zach Woodlee as Dancer
- Blake Shields as Homecoming Knight

== Production ==
In April 1999, Miramax Films purchased the spec script by Andrew Lowery and Andrew Miller, two actors who started writing together. Robert Iscove signed on to direct, reuniting the director and star of She's All That. Iscove said Prinze "wanted to blow away that good-looking guy image and grow as an actor" by playing a geek. Prinze said, "Most people won't give me a chance to play something different than the good-looking guy. But I love trying new things; I love doing something I haven't done before, and the chance to play a geek was the reason I accepted this role in the first place."

Prinze added, "I set out a goal when I was making She's All That to do three movies for a specific generation...I did She's All That, Down to You, and Boys and Girls. Now, I've graduated from high school and college for a while."

Anna Friel was originally attached as the female lead, but Friel pulled out shortly before filming started due to reported "creative differences" and was replaced by Claire Forlani. Reports differed over whether Friel was fired or quit due to unhappiness with the script.

The film features a dance number similar to She's All That wherein everyone dances to the song "Stop the Rock" by Apollo 440. Forlani said she was given minimal notice to do it, saying "They literally pull me into this room with 30 dancers who for two days have been learning a routine that I have to learn in half an hour. And it was really complicated, too. I was in the corner … and they ordered like, the Gap kids … and I thought, 'Oh f***, I'm doomed! And Freddie said, 'Oh, I can do it.' And I said, 'Well, that's because you're not meant to get it right.'"

Jason Biggs made the film after his breakthrough role in American Pie. It was the first in a two-picture deal he had with Miramax.

Prinze said that Harvey Weinstein had wanted to put a sword fight in She's All That and in this film. He commented, "we got a note from Harvey that said they wanted to put a sword fight into [Boys and Girls] too, which made no sense because it was a contemporary piece, and Jason Biggs played an architecture student! Those were the crazy notes you'd get from the studio back in the day. I don't understand how Miramax directors didn't all go insane."

== Release ==
Boys and Girls was theatrically released in the United States by Dimension Films on June 16, 2000.

== Reception ==
=== Box office ===
Boys and Girls grossed $21.8 million in the United States, and $4 million in other territories, for a worldwide total of $25.8 million.

In the United States, Boys and Girls was released alongside Shaft and Titan A.E., and grossed $7 million in its opening weekend, ranking sixth at the box office. The film dropped to tenth in its second weekend, grossing $3.2 million and experiencing a 53.9% drop.

=== Critical response ===
The film received mainly negative reviews. On Rotten Tomatoes, the film has a score of 11% based on reviews from 63 critics, with an average rating 3.9 out of 10. The site's critics consensus states, "Boys and Girls feels like a cheap rip-off of When Harry Met Sally. The predictable and stale story fails to engage." On Metacritic, the film has a score of 29 out of 100 based on 26 critics, indicating "generally unfavorable" reviews.

== Home media ==
The film was released on DVD and VHS on November 14, 2000, by Dimension Home Video. On January 6, 2012, Lionsgate reissued Boys and Girls on DVD.

Paramount Home Entertainment reissued the film on DVD with new artwork on February 23, 2021, with this being one of many Dimension/Miramax titles that they reissued. Paramount also made the film available on their streaming service Paramount+.
