= Natalie Raitano =

American actress (born 1966)

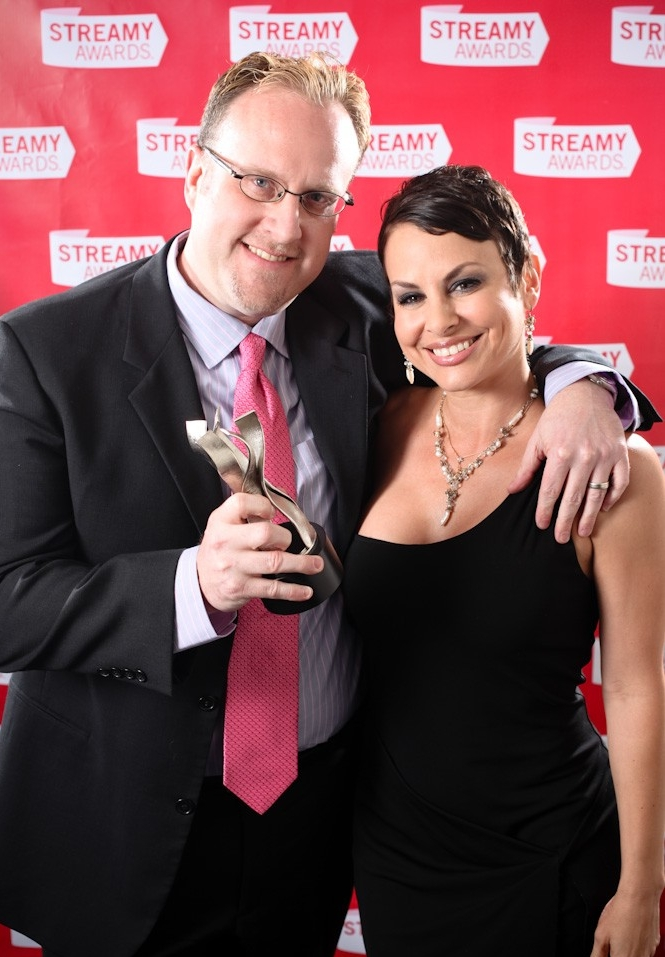
- Blake Calhoun and Natalie Raitano at the Streamy Awards in March 2009
- Born: October 3, 1966 (age 59); Charleroi, Pennsylvania, U.S.
- Occupation: Actress
- Years active: 1998–2012

Natalie Raitano (born October 3, 1966) is a former American actress and current fitness professional, fitness expert, strength training coach.

== Biography ==
Raitano was born in Charleroi, Pennsylvania, on October 3, 1966, and is of Italian descent. She is a 1984 graduate of Monongahela Valley Catholic High School, in Monongahela, Pennsylvania, and also studied ballet.

She was active working with Special Olympics; her mother was also an active contributor in efforts to co-ordinate volunteers. She is best known for portraying the role of Nikki Franco on the syndicated action series V.I.P. In 1999, Natalie appeared on the MTV hit show Loveline along with co-stars (Pamela Anderson and Molly Culver) from the television series. They gave advice to the audience and answered calls.

Prior to V.I.P., Raitano was an aerobics instructor and was the host of the ESPN2 show Hip Hop Body Shop. She was also a member of a singing musical group called Breeze.

In 2006, she hosted a podcast, Famous Shit Stories. In late 2006, she starred in Killing Down which was written and directed by Blake Calhoun. Natalie was also well known for her role as "Nate" in the hit NBC television series Pink.

Raitano moved back to Charleroi, Pennsylvania in 2020 to be closer to her family. In 2023, she opened and managed SUPERBODIES by Nat in nearby Rostraver, Pennsylvania.

== Filmography ==
Film and television
Year	Title	Role	Notes
1998–2002	V.I.P.	Nikki Franco	88 episodes
2000	Martial Law	Ivana Bock	4 episodes
2004	Slammed	Luscious Lola	
2005	One More Round	Madeleine	
2005	Ganked	Lasandra Barry	Video
2006	Killing Down	Angela	
2006	Truth Be Told	Jennifer Reeves	Short film
2007	Hip Hop Harry	Miss Janet	Episode: "Make Your Dreams Come True"
2007	Polly and Marie	Faith Carter	TV movie
2007	The Benvenuti Family	Angelina Benvenuti	TV series
2007–2008	Pink	Nate	14 episodes
2008	Jada	Brenda	
2009	The Killing of Wendy	Pat	
2009	The Joshua's Soul Film Short	Nurse 1	Short film
2010	The Insider		1 episode
2012	Letting Go	Page	
