= V.I.P. (American TV series) =

American action-dramedy television series

- Genre: Action comedy; Camp
- Created by: J. F. Lawton
- Starring: Pamela Anderson; Molly Culver; Natalie Raitano; Shaun Baker; Dustin Nguyen; Angelle Brooks; Leah Lail
- Theme music composer: Frankie Blue
- Country of origin: United States
- Original language: English
- No. of seasons: 4
- No. of episodes: 88 (list of episodes)

Production
- Executive producers: Pamela Anderson; J. F. Lawton
- Running time: 45–48 minutes
- Production companies: Lawton Entertainment; Columbia TriStar Domestic Television (Note: Credited as Columbia TriStar Television Distribution (1998–2001) (seasons 1–4).)

Original release
- Network: Syndication
- Release: September 26, 1998 – May 18, 2002

V.I.P. is an American action comedy television series created by J. F. Lawton. The series stars Pamela Anderson as Vallery Irons, a woman who accidentally saves a celebrity and then is hired by a real bodyguard agency V.I.P. a.k.a. Vallery Irons Protection. Anderson served as an executive producer of the series. It aired in syndication for four seasons from 1998 to 2002.

== Synopsis ==
Anderson stars as Vallery Irons, a woman who accidentally saves a celebrity and then is hired by a real bodyguard agency (V.I.P. a.k.a. Vallery Irons Protection) as a famous figurehead while the rest of the agency's professionals work to solve cases. Her lack of investigation skills ends up defeating the antagonists in every episode.

The other team members are an assortment of people of different backgrounds: a former member of the KGB, CIA, FBI, a computer expert, a former law officer, a former street boxer/martial artist and, later, a karate master/stuntman joined.

The series uses a mixture of action, comedy, and camp, with Anderson often poking fun at her tabloid image. In November 2001, a video game version of V.I.P. was released on the PlayStation console.

Many first season episodes opened with cameos of famous celebrities being protected by Vallery. Among them were Stone Cold Steve Austin, Jay Leno, Charles Barkley, Jerry Springer and Alfonso Ribeiro. Loni Anderson, of no relation to Pamela Anderson, guest-starred in one episode as Vallery's mother. In season 2, Lisa Marie Varon had an uncredited appearance as a bodyguard. Kathleen Kinmont-See was a guest star in the season 4 episode "South by Southwest".

== Cast ==
=== Main ===
- Pamela Anderson — Vallery Irons, the glamorous figurehead
- Molly Culver — Natasha "Tasha" Dexter, Vallery Iron's lead associate, a former spy and model
- Natalie Raitano — Nicole "Nikki" Franco, the team's weapons and explosives expert
- Angelle Brooks — Maxine De La Cruz (Seasons 3–4, recurring seasons 1–2), Vallery's best friend
- Shaun Baker — Quick Williams, a former boxer and martial artist
- Dustin Nguyen — Johnny Loh (Seasons 3–4, recurring seasons 1–2), a karate master and stuntman
- Leah Lail — Kay Simmons, the team's computer expert

=== Recurring ===
- Gerry Anderson as Relic
- Javier Grajeda as Detective Grispy
- Jillian Barberie as Foxy Levin
- David Groh as Don Franco
- Erik Estrada as Himself
- Angela Harry as Dr. Tina Stokes
- Loni Anderson as Carol Irons, Vallery's mother

=== Guest stars ===
- Bryan Cranston
- Pauly Shore
- Joey Lawrence
- Ian Ziering
- Stone Cold Steve Austin
- Bill Maher
- Coolio
- Charles Barkley
- Bronson Pinchot
- Richard Lewis
- Morgan Fairchild
- Shannon Tweed
- Gilbert Gottfried
- Verne Troyer
- David Chokachi
- Alfonso Ribeiro
- Sherman Hemsley
- Hugh Hefner
- Billy Blanks
- Jerry Springer
- Sheila E.
- Downtown Julie Brown
- Robin Leach
- Eric Karros
- Tom Arnold
- Christopher Reid
- Katarina Witt
- Rita Rudner
- Udo Kier
- Elizabeth Bogush
- John Salley
- Eric Steinberg
- Gregory Itzin
- Penn & Teller
- Sean Kanan
- Lisa LoCicero
- John D'Aquino
- Donny Osmond
- Brad Greenquist
- Albie Selznick
- Richard Biggs
- Daniel Roebuck
- Sydney Walsh
- Mark Tymchyshyn
- John Allen Nelson
- Ed Quinn
- Jeannetta Arnette
- Tristan Rogers
- Daphnée Duplaix
- Joseph Bottoms
- Alexandra Wilson
- Shawn Christian
- David Lee Smith
- Michelle Stafford
- Rob Van Dam
- Angelica Bridges
- Victor Webster
- Tyler Mane
- "Weird Al" Yankovic
- Stephanie Zimbalist
- Louie Anderson
- Nick Kiriazis
- Yasmine Bleeth
- Robert Gant
- Brandon Douglas
- Margaret Smith
- Takeo Spikes
- Dean Norris
- David Naughton
- Laurie Fortier
- Christian Oliver
- Lil' Kim
- Steve Valentine
- Alexia Robinson
- Taylor Sheridan
- Ray Wise
- Corbin Bernsen
- Ashley Jones
- Stephen J. Cannell
- Terence Knox
- John Paul DeJoria
- Joyce Brothers
- Clive Robertson
- Eva Mendes
- Lee Majors
- Natalia Cigliuti
- Kim Morgan Greene
- Gil Birmingham
- Spencer Garrett
- Jocelyn Seagrave
- Sarah Silverman
- Dorothy Lyman
- Amber Smith
- RuPaul
- Kathleen Kinmont
- Wayne Wilderson
- Morgan Brittany
- Rick Hoffman
- Robin Riker
- Max Kasch
- Curtis Armstrong
- Diane Farr

== Episodes ==
Season	Episodes	Originally released	
Season	Episodes	First released	Last released
1	22	September 26, 1998	May 22, 1999
2	22	September 25, 1999	May 20, 2000
3	22	October 7, 2000	May 19, 2001
4	22	September 22, 2001	May 18, 2002

== Merchandise ==
On March 14, 2006, Sony Pictures Home Entertainment released the first season of V.I.P. on DVD in Region 1.

V.I.P. received video game adaptations from Ubi Soft, for the PC, PlayStation, PlayStation 2, Game Boy Color and Game Boy Advance in 2001 and 2002. An adaptation for Xbox was announced but cancelled.

In 2000, Johnny Lightning released two sets of V.I.P. themed diecast cars in 1/64 scale. There were 8 different vehicles issued in total.

TV Comics! published a comic based on the series in 2000.

The series V.I.P. was co-produced with Telewizja Polsat from Poland. This is the first foreign series co-created by Telewizja Polsat, which exclusively aired the show in Poland.

== Awards and nominations ==
In 1999, the series was nominated for a Primetime Emmy Award for Outstanding Main Title Theme Music. In 2002, V.I.P. was nominated for three Daytime Emmy Awards, winning one for Outstanding Single Camera Editing.

== Syndication ==
External videos
- V.I.P. FULL PILOT EPISODE | V.I.P. (1998) on YouTube official upload of the series' pilot episode.

The show premiered in syndication on September 26, 1998. Among the stations that carried it was the ensemble of Fox's 22 owned-and-operated stations, who signed when the show was in pre-production in December 1997. As of 2026, the series is currently airing on MeTV+ and is available for streaming online on Amazon Prime Video, The Roku Channel (both via the Howdy subscription-video-on-demand streaming service that Roku owned) and the Fox Corporation-owned Tubi (that added in May 2021), but formerly on Crackle (until 2023). Episodes in Spanish debuted on CineSony on February 14, 2014.

Select episodes of the show (including the pilot episode) are also available on the Piece of the Action and Throw Back TV YouTube channels (managed by Sony Pictures Television, the show's current international distributor).
