= Josh Swickard =

American model and actor

- Born: Joshua Swickard; July 4, 1991 (age 35); Quincy, Illinois, U.S.
- Occupations: Actor; model
- Years active: 2010–present
- Spouse: Lauren Swickard (m. 2019)
- Children: 3
- Modeling information
- Hair color: Brown
- Eye color: Hazel
- Agency: Wilhelmina Models (Los Angeles)

Joshua Swickard (born July 4, 1991) is an American model and actor. In 2018 he began playing the role of Harrison Chase in the ABC daytime soap opera, General Hospital. Swickard also starred in films A California Christmas (2020) and its sequel, A California Christmas: City Lights (2021), and Holiday in the Vineyards (2023).

== Early life ==
Swickard was born in Quincy, Illinois, to parents Bob, senior pastor at St. Matthew Church in Belleville, and Gina, a vocal coach. He has three sisters. He studied at Glenwood High School and attended the College of DuPage where he studied accounting for 2 years. Then he modeled for about 6 years in Chicago. Swickard is a descendant of Daniel Zwigart, who landed in Philadelphia on the ship Betsey in 1765.

== Career ==
Swickard is managed by Factor Chosen Chicago, and Wilhelmina Models. He started his modeling career in 2010, when he appeared in the Oh lala Magazine, and again in 2012. In 2013, he appeared in Q. He made his acting debut in 2015 by guest-starring in an episode of K.C. Undercover as a football dude. In the same year, he landed the recurring role of Todd Stetson in another television series Liv and Maddie. In early 2017, he was cast in a film called Roped as Colton, which he confirmed on Instagram in September. In late 2017, Swickard was cast in the soap opera General Hospital as Harrison Chase. He debuted on February 21, 2018.

In 2020, Swickard made his film debut playing the leading role in the romantic drama Roped opposite his wife, Lauren Swickard. They later starred together in the Christmas romantic comedy-drama film, A California Christmas and its sequel, A California Christmas: City Lights for Netflix. In 2022 he starred in Hollywood Christmas for HBO Max. In 2023 he starred in another Netflix Christmas romantic comedy film, Holiday in the Vineyards.

== Personal life ==
In December 2018, Josh announced his engagement to girlfriend, actress Lauren York. The pair married on July 6, 2019. They have two children together. In 2026, the couple welcomed their third child, another son.

== Filmography ==
Film roles
| Year | Title | Role | Notes |
|---|---|---|---|
| 2020 | Roped | Colton Threnshaw | |
| 2020 | A California Christmas | Joseph | Co-producer |
| 2021 | A California Christmas City Lights | Joseph | Producer |
| 2022 | Hollywood Christmas | Christopher | Executive producer |
| 2023 | Holiday in the Vineyards | Carter Baldwyn | |

Television roles
| Year | Title | Role | Notes |
|---|---|---|---|
| 2015–2016 | Liv and Maddie | Todd Stetson | Recurring role (seasons 2–4), 4 episodes |
| 2016 | K.C. Undercover | Football dude | Episode: "Virtual Insanity" |
| 2018–present | General Hospital | Harrison Chase | Series regular |
| 2018 | School of Rock | Rodrigo | Episode: "Photograph" |
