= Lauren Swickard =

American actress

- Born: May 25, 1993 (age 33); Cincinnati, Ohio, U.S.
- Occupations: Actress; writer; producer
- Years active: 2011–present
- Spouse: Josh Swickard (m. 2019)
- Children: 3

Lauren Swickard (born May 25, 1993), also known as Lorynn York, is an American actress, writer and producer. She is known for her role as Callie in the romantic comedy-drama film, A California Christmas (2020) and its sequel, A California Christmas: City Lights (2021). In 2023, she created and produced the Amazon Freevee bilingual limited series, Casa Grande.

== Early life ==
Swickard was born in Cincinnati, Ohio. Her mother, Linda Berry York, is a homemaker and her father, Michael York, is a technology entrepreneur. She has one younger sister. At a younger age Swickard attended the School of American Ballet, where she danced professionally. Lauren attended and graduated from Charlotte Christian School.

== Career ==
Swickard began her career by acting in various smaller roles in films such as Safe Haven and Iron Man 3. Her first leading role was in the 2014 romantic drama film, Southern Comfort. She later appeared in the Lifetime movies Babysitter's Black Book (2015), Broken Promise (2016), Turbulence (2016), Web Cam Girls (2017), Twisted Twin (2020), and Deadly Sugar Daddy (2020). She had one major role in the TV Series Social Path which aired between 2012 and 2014. In 2017 she appeared in the Netflix comedy series, Dear White People. In 2020, Swickard starred in Roped and A California Christmas. Swickard also wrote and produced A California Christmas. In 2023, she had a recurring role in the ABC daytime soap opera, General Hospital, appearing opposite her husband, Josh Swickard.

== Personal life ==
Swickard met Josh Swickard while filming Roped, where they both starred. In 2018 they announced their engagement, and in July 2019 they got married. In April 2021, the couple welcomed their first child together, a daughter. In February 2023, they welcomed their second child, a son. In 2026, Lauren gave birth to the couple's third child, another son.

== Filmography ==
=== Film ===
Year	Title	Role	Notes
2013	Safe Haven	Dunkin Donuts Girl	Uncredited
2013	Iron Man 3	Miss Johnson City	Uncredited
2013	10 Rules for Sleeping Around	Model	
2014	Southern Comfort	Betty Lane	
2015	Ghost Witch	Heather	
2016	Rosemont	Sylvia	
2019	Intermate	Desa	
2019	Submission	Summer	
2019	Airplane Mode	Ariel	
2020	Roped	Tracy Peterson	
2020	A California Christmas	Callie	Writer and producer
2021	A California Christmas: City Lights	Callie	Writer and producer
2022	That's Amor		Co-producer
2022	I Believe in Santa		Co-producer
2022	Holiday Harmony	Lila	Writer and producer

2026 Casa Grande, actor character Rowan Reyes

=== Television ===
Year	Title	Role	Notes
2012	Eastbound & Down	Andrea's Friend	Episode: "Chapter 16"
2012	Deadly Sins	Amy Preasmyer	Episode: "Reckless Abandon (Anger)"
2013	The Neighbors	Kara	Episode: "Good Debbie Hunting"
2012–2014	Social Path	Scarlett Cambridge	12 episodes
2015	Whitney	Fan	Television film
2015	Baby Sitter's Black Book	Janet	Television film
2016	Broken Promise	Hali	Television film
2016	2 Lava 2 Lantula	Daniella	Television film
2016	Turbulence	Lacey	Television film
2017	Web Cam Girls	Carolyn	Television film
2016	The Perfect Daughter	Kalie	Television film
2017	Dear White People	Danielle	2 episodes
2018	Room for Murder	Kristen	Television film
2020	Twisted Twin	Tess Houston / Sammy Crane	Television film
2023	Casa Grande	Rowan Reyes	Creator and executive producer
2023	General Hospital	Janice Jo	10 episodes
