= Angela Harry =

American actress (born 1963)

- Born: April 12, 1963 (age 63); Fukuoka, Japan
- Occupations: Model, actress
- Years active: 1990–2008

Angela Harry (born April 12, 1963) is an American model, actress and voice actress.

== Early life and career ==
Harry was born on April 12, 1963, while her father, a colonel in the US Air Force, was stationed in Japan. Her mother was born in Korea. She has a younger brother and a younger sister. Harry was subjected to racial insults during school. Her family moved throughout the United States, back to Japan and then to Korea by the time she was six. During this time she took piano lessons and briefly ballet.

While working at Saks Fifth Avenue, Harry secured her first modelling job at the age of eighteen and went on to appear in several ad campaigns. After joining the Nina Blanchard Agency in 1984, Harry bought an apartment in Irvine.

In 1997, Harry played Jan Ors in Dark Forces II: Jedi Knight, who was modeled to look like Harry in subsequent appearances.

== Personal life ==
Harry was briefly involved with a male model and writer whom she met in a club in Tokyo.

She enjoys gardening and goes to a gym most nights.

== Filmography ==
=== Film ===
Year	Title	Role	Notes
1996	Raven	Eva	Direct-to-video
2001	To Protect and Serve		

=== Television ===
Year	Title	Role	Notes
1990	Santa Barbara	Lani	4 episodes
1993	Blindsided	Asian Woman	Television film
1994	One West Waikiki	Miki Kalani	Episode: "Vanishing Act"
1994	Fortune Hunter	Nev Collins	Episode: "The Cursed Dagger"
1995	Baywatch Nights	Corine	Episode: "Silent Witness"
1995	Diagnosis Murder	Joon Li	Episode: "An Innocent Murder"
1996	Strange Luck	Jake In 501	2 episodes
1996–1997	Tarzan: The Epic Adventures	Queen La	3 episodes
1997	Silk Stalkings	Helen Lee	Episode: "Exit the Dragon"
1998–2001	V.I.P.	Dr. Tina Stokes	3 episodes
2008	The Young and the Restless	Sandra Chang	Episode: #1.8820

=== Video games ===
Year	Title	Role	Notes
1997	Star Wars Jedi Knight: Dark Forces II	Jan Ors	
