= Gregory Zarian =

American actor

- Born: Glendale, California, U.S.
- Occupations: Actor, host
- Years active: 1986–present
- Relatives: Lawrence Zarian (brother); Vincent Zarian (brother)

Gregory Zarian is an American film and television actor. He is best known for his recurring role as Reed Phillips in the HBO series Westworld and as Nate in the webseries Venice: The Series. He is also known for his role as Avi in the film 86 Melrose Avenue and as David in the film That's Amor.

== Filmography ==
=== Film ===
Year	Title	Role	Notes
2009	Reconciliation	Patrick	
2010	Wish Makers of West Hollywood	Dan	Short film
2012	Nesting	Shane	
2013	Hot Guys with Guns	Kyle Vagiene	
2014	Life Gets in the Way	Frank	
2017	Hometown Hero	Mr. Tavares	TV movie
2018	The Choir Director	Pastor Gianetti	
2018	Woman	Ex-Boyfriend	Short film
2018	Woman on the Edge	Aaron Mason	
2019	From Zero to I Love You	Christopher Randolph	
2020	Painter	Glen Gale	
2020	86 Melrose Avenue	Avi	
2022	That's Amor	David	
2023	Here We Are	Terry	
2023	Holiday in the Vineyards	Joeffrey	

=== Television ===
Year	Title	Role	Notes
1986-87	Days of Our Lives	Brent	6 episodes
2007-08	General Hospital	Julius	4 episodes
2008	Nip/Tuck	Dr. Joseph Berkowitz	1 episode
2010	The Forgotten	Thomas Jordan	1 episode
2011	The Mentalist	Man	1 episode
2011	Entourage	James	1 episode
2013	Revenge	Benny	1 episode
2015	Castle	Scott Galloway	1 episode
2015	Chasing Life	Max	2 episodes
2015	Bones	Anthony Taylor	1 episode
2017-19	Venice: The Series	Nate	7 episodes
2018	Criminal Minds	Walter Trudeau	1 episode
2019	Counterpart	Volker	1 episode
2019-20	The Family Business	The Employer	3 episodes
2020	Swipe Right	Jameson Jameson	Mini Series
2020	Westworld	Reed Phillips	2 episodes
2022	Mystery Incorporated	Samuel Rogers	12 episodes
2023	The Wonder Years	Herb Hitman	Episode: "Blockbusting"
2017-25	Venice: The Series	Nate/Detective Nick Pfander	12 episodes
2025	The Rookie	Atlas Rice	Episode: "Mutiny and the Bounty"

== Awards and nominations ==
Year	Result	Award	Category	Work	Ref.
2020	Nominated	Daytime Emmy Awards	Outstanding Supporting Actor in a Digital Drama	Venice: The Series	
2021	Nominated	Idyllwild International Festival of Cinema	Best Supporting Actor	86 Melrose Avenue	
