= Kiss the Bride (2002 film) =

2002 film by Vanessa Parise

- DVD cover
- Directed by: Vanessa Parise
- Written by: Vanessa Parise
- Produced by: Vanessa Parise; Marco Derhy; Jordan Gertner
- Starring: Amanda Detmer; Sean Patrick Flanery; Brooke Langton; Monet Mazur; Alyssa Milano
- Production companies: Empera Pictures; Imageworks Entertainment International; Replay Pictures
- Distributed by: MGM Home Entertainment
- Release date: October 16, 2002 (Hamptons Film Festival)
- Running time: 89 minutes
- Language: English

Kiss the Bride is a 2002 American romantic comedy drama film about an Italian family, directed by Vanessa Parise. The film takes place in Parise's hometown of Westerly, Rhode Island. The film premiered at the Hamptons International Film Festival, where it won the Golden Starfish Award. It was released on DVD by MGM Home Entertainment.

== Plot ==
The story centers around a traditional Italian-American family and four daughters, each of whom have completely different personalities. Danni, the first of the sisters who will walk down the aisle, is a demure virgin who longs to stay close to home and her parents. Niki, Toni and Chrissy return home for the long overdue family reunion, which ultimately turns into a contest of who can one-up the other. Niki, a TV actress, brings along her manager boyfriend, the lesbian Toni is accompanied by her biker girlfriend Amy, and Chrissy, a Wall Street stockbroker who is too busy for a boyfriend, brings her brand new Porsche. The sisters, who subconsciously long for the approval and love of their domineering father, renew old familial wounds as they bring up feelings of overachievement and insecurity.

== Cast ==
- Amanda Detmer as Danisa "Danni" Sposato
  - Alyssa Altman as Young Danni
- Sean Patrick Flanery as Tom Terranova
- Brooke Langton as Nikoleta "Niki" Sposato, Danni's second older sister
  - Francesca Catalano as Young Niki
- Monet Mazur as Antonia "Toni" Sposato, Danni's younger sister
- Alyssa Milano as Amy Kayne, Toni's girlfriend
- Vanessa Parise as Christina "Chrissy" Sposato, Danni's first older sister
- Johnathon Schaech as Geoffrey "Geoff" Brancato, Danni's husband
- Johnny Whitworth as Marty Weinberg, Niki's boyfriend
- Burt Young as Santo Sposato, Danni's father
- Talia Shire as Irena Sposato, Danni's mother
- Frances Bay as Grandma Julia
- Donna D'Errico as Officer Daisy
- Charlie O'Connell as Joey
- Jeremy Parise as Phil

== Reception ==
The film has a 33% critics's rating from 6 reviews on review aggregator website Rotten Tomatoes.

Ronnie Scheib of Variety wrote the film feels "less a celebration of warm, touchy-feely Italian culture than an unoriginal putdown of contemporary American (read New York/Hollywood) mores". He added that the acting is uneven; though he singled out Shire, Young, Flanery, and Milano. Of the latter, he wrote, "Milano as a lesbian in love with Toni, effortlessly commands the screen as she tells off her lover for using her to shock the family".

David Nusair or Reel Film Reviews was more positive, writing "Parise does such an effective job of establishing all these characters" and that she is "able to make all of this seem fresh, despite the fact that this is the sort of tale we've seen countless times before (ie My Big Fat Greek Wedding)".
