= List of awards and nominations received by Pushing Daisies =

Awards and nominations for Pushing Daisies
Awards and nominations
Award	Wins	Nominations
ASC Awards	0	1
Artios Awards	2	2
CDG Awards	1	2
DGA Awards	1	1
Edgar Allan Poe Awards	0	1
Emmy Awards (Creative)	5	12
Emmy Awards (Primetime)	2	5
Ewwy Awards	0	4
Excellence in Production Design Awards	0	2
Family TV Awards	2	2
Golden Globe Awards	0	3
Gracie Allen Awards	1	1
Hollywood Music Awards	1	1
Hollywood Post Alliance Awards	2	2
People's Choice Awards	0	1
Satellite Awards	1	6
Saturn Awards	0	2
Scream Awards	0	2
TCA Awards	0	1
Visual Effects Society Awards	0	2
WGA Awards	0	2
Young Artist Awards	0	2

Totals (Note: Certain award groups do not simply award one winner. They acknowledge several different recipients, have runners-up, and have third place. Since this is a specific recognition and is different from losing an award, runner-up mentions are considered wins in this award tally. For simplification and to avoid errors, each award in this list has been presumed to have had a prior nomination.)
- Wins: 18
- Nominations: 57

The following is a list of awards and nominations received by Pushing Daisies.

== Awards and nominations ==
Award	Year	Category	Nominee(s)	Result	Ref.
American Society of Cinematographers Awards	2008	Outstanding Achievement in Cinematography in TV Movie / Miniseries / Pilot	Michael Weaver (for "Pie-lette")	Nominated	
Art Directors Guild Awards	2008	Excellence in Production Design for an Episode of a Single-Camera TV Series	Michael Wylie and William Durrell (for "Pie-lette")	Nominated	
Art Directors Guild Awards	2009	Excellence in Production Design for an Episode of a Single-Camera TV Series	Michael Wylie, Kenneth J. Creber, Philip Dagort, Jeff Ozimek, Kim Papazian, and Halina Siwolop (for "Bzzzzzzzzz!")	Nominated	
Artios Awards	2008	Outstanding Achievement in Casting for Comedy TV Pilot	Meg Liberman and Cami Patton (for "Pie-lette")	Won	
Artios Awards	2008	Outstanding Achievement in Casting for Comedy TV Series	Meg Liberman, Cami Patton, and Jennifer Lare	Won	
Costume Designers Guild Awards	2008	Excellence in Costume Design for Period or Fantasy TV Series	Robert Blackman	Won	
Costume Designers Guild Awards	2009	Excellence in Costume Design for Period or Fantasy TV Series	Robert Blackman	Nominated	
Directors Guild of America Awards	2008	Outstanding Directing – Comedy Series	Barry Sonnenfeld (for "Pie-lette")	Won	
Edgar Allan Poe Awards	2008	Best TV Episode Teleplay	Bryan Fuller (for "Pie-lette")	Nominated	
Ewwy Awards	2008	Best Actress in a Comedy Series	Anna Friel	Nominated	
Ewwy Awards	2008	Best Supporting Actor in a Comedy Series	Chi McBride	Nominated	
Ewwy Awards	2009	Best Comedy Series	Pushing Daisies	Nominated	
Ewwy Awards	2009	Best Supporting Actor in a Comedy Series	Chi McBride	Nominated	
Family Television Awards	2007	Outstanding New Series	Pushing Daisies	Won	
Family Television Awards	2008	Outstanding Comedy	Pushing Daisies	Won	
Golden Globe Awards	2008	Best Television Series – Musical or Comedy	Pushing Daisies	Nominated	
Golden Globe Awards	2008	Best Actor in a Television Series – Musical or Comedy	Lee Pace	Nominated	
Golden Globe Awards	2008	Best Actress in a Television Series – Musical or Comedy	Anna Friel	Nominated	
Gracie Awards	2008	Outstanding Comedy	Pushing Daisies	Nominated	
Hollywood Music Awards	2008	Best Original Score – TV	Jim Dooley	Won	
Hollywood Post Alliance Awards	2008	Outstanding Color Grading – Television	Joe Hathaway (for "The Fun in Funeral")	Won	
Hollywood Post Alliance Awards	2008	Outstanding Editing – Television	Stuart Bass (for "Pie-lette")	Won	
People's Choice Awards	2008	Favorite New TV Comedy	Pushing Daisies	Nominated	
Primetime Emmy Awards	2008	Outstanding Lead Actor in a Comedy Series	Lee Pace	Nominated	
Primetime Emmy Awards	2008	Outstanding Supporting Actress in a Comedy Series	Kristin Chenoweth	Nominated	
Primetime Emmy Awards	2008	Outstanding Directing for a Comedy Series	Barry Sonnenfeld (for "Pie-lette")	Won	
Primetime Emmy Awards	2008	Outstanding Writing for a Comedy Series	Bryan Fuller (for "Pie-lette")	Nominated	
Primetime Emmy Awards	2009	Outstanding Supporting Actress in a Comedy Series	Kristin Chenoweth	Won	
Primetime Creative Arts Emmy Awards	2008	Outstanding Art Direction for a Single-Camera Series	William Durrell Jr., Halina Siwolop, and Michael Wylie (for "Pie-lette")	Nominated	
Primetime Creative Arts Emmy Awards	2008	Outstanding Casting for a Comedy Series	Jennifer Lare, Meg Lieberman, and Camille Patton	Nominated	
Primetime Creative Arts Emmy Awards	2008	Outstanding Costumes for a Series	Mary Vogt and Stephanie Fox-Kramer (for "Pie-lette")	Nominated	
Primetime Creative Arts Emmy Awards	2008	Outstanding Hairstyling for a Single-Camera Series	Daniel Curet and Yuko Tokunaga-Koach (for "Smell of Success")	Nominated	
Primetime Creative Arts Emmy Awards	2008	Outstanding Makeup for a Single-Camera Series (Non-Prosthetic)	Todd McIntosh, David De Leon, and Bradley Look (for "Dummy")	Nominated	
Primetime Creative Arts Emmy Awards	2008	Outstanding Prosthetic Makeup for a Series, Miniseries, Movie or a Special	Todd McIntosh, David De Leon, and Sara De Pue (for "Smell of Success")	Nominated	
Primetime Creative Arts Emmy Awards	2008	Outstanding Music Composition for a Series (Original Dramatic Score)	Jim Dooley (for "Pigeon")	Won	
Primetime Creative Arts Emmy Awards	2008	Outstanding Single-Camera Picture Editing for a Comedy Series	Stuart Bass (for "Pie-lette")	Won	
Primetime Creative Arts Emmy Awards	2009	Outstanding Art Direction for a Single-Camera Series	William Durrell Jr., Halina Siwolop, and Michael Wylie (for "Dim Sum Lose Some")	Won	
Primetime Creative Arts Emmy Awards	2009	Outstanding Costumes for a Series	Robert Blackman and Carol Kunz (for "Bzzzzzzzzz!")	Won	
Primetime Creative Arts Emmy Awards	2009	Outstanding Hairstyling for a Single-Camera Series	Daniel Curet, Yuko Koach, Gloria Conrad, and Elizabeth Rabe (for "Dim Sum Lose Some")	Nominated	
Primetime Creative Arts Emmy Awards	2009	Outstanding Makeup for a Single-Camera Series (Non-Prosthetic)	Todd McIntosh, David De Leon, and Steven Anderson (for "Dim Sum Lose Some")	Won	
Satellite Awards	2007	Best Television Series – Musical or Comedy	Pushing Daisies	Won	
Satellite Awards	2007	Best Actor in a Television Series – Musical or Comedy	Lee Pace	Nominated	
Satellite Awards	2007	Best Actress in a Television Series – Musical or Comedy	Anna Friel	Nominated	
Satellite Awards	2008	Best Television Series – Musical or Comedy	Pushing Daisies	Nominated	
Satellite Awards	2008	Best Actor in a Television Series – Musical or Comedy	Lee Pace	Nominated	
Satellite Awards	2008	Best Supporting Actress – Series, Miniseries or Television Film	Kristin Chenoweth	Nominated	
Saturn Awards	2008	Best Network Television Series	Pushing Daisies	Nominated	
Saturn Awards	2008	Best Actor on Television	Lee Pace	Nominated	
Saturn Awards	2008	Best Actress on Television	Anna Friel	Nominated	
Scream Awards	2008	Breakout Performance	Anna Friel	Nominated	
Scream Awards	2009	Best Fantasy Actress	Anna Friel	Nominated	
Television Critics Association Awards	2008	Outstanding New Program	Pushing Daisies	Nominated	
Visual Effects Society Awards	2008	Outstanding Supporting Visual Effects in a Broadcast Program	Craig Weiss, Toni Pace Carstensen, Brian Vogt, and Jimmy Berndt (for "Pie-lette")	Nominated	
Visual Effects Society Awards	2009	Outstanding Supporting Visual Effects in a Broadcast Program	William Powloski, Elizabeth Castro, Melanie Tucker, and Eric Chauvin (for "The Legend of Merle McQuoddy")	Nominated	
Writers Guild of America Awards	2008	Television: New Series	Chad Gomez Creasey, Dara Resnik Creasey, Bryan Fuller, Abby Gewanter, Jim Danger Gray, Lisa Joy, Katherine Lingenfelter, Rina Mimoun, Jack Monaco, Scott Nimerfro, and Peter Ocko	Nominated	
Writers Guild of America Awards	2008	Television: Episodic Comedy	Bryan Fuller (for "Pie-lette")	Nominated	
Young Artist Awards	2008	Best Performance in a TV Series by a Young Actor Ten or Under	Field Cate	Nominated	
Young Artist Awards	2008	Best Performance in a TV Series by a Guest Starring Young Actor	Colby Paul (for "Corpsicle")	Nominated	
