= Ned (Pushing Daisies) =

American TV character, created 2007

- Pushing Daisies character
- First appearance: Pie-lette
- Last appearance: Kerplunk
- Created by: Bryan Fuller
- Portrayed by: Lee Pace; Field Cate (young Ned)

In-universe information
- Nickname: The Pie Maker
- Gender: Male
- Occupation: Pie maker, amateur detective

Ned is the protagonist of the ABC television series Pushing Daisies, portrayed by Lee Pace. Ned is the Pie-Maker proprietor of The Pie Hole, notable for his ability to resurrect the dead with a single touch.

When private investigator Emerson Cod (Chi McBride) accidentally discovers Ned's ability, the two enter a partnership: Ned briefly revives those who died under suspicious circumstances, then Ned and Cod collect the reward for solving the mysterious crime.

Young Ned is portrayed by Field Cate during flashback scenes.

== Ability ==
Ned brings the dead back to life with a single touch, but there are two conditions. First, if he touches a dead person, plant or animal for a second time, it will die forever. Secondly, if the revived remains alive for more than sixty seconds, something or someone else in close proximity will die in its place. Generally, whatever dies is a rough equivalent to what has been revived: a human for a human, an animal for an animal, or a plant for a plant.

Revival may suspend the aging process. Ned's dog Digby, having been resurrected by Ned when Ned was nine and Digby was three, remains alive to this day and appears to be in healthy physical condition despite living well past the average number of dog years.

== Character biography ==
Ned discovered his gift by reviving his dog, Digby, who was run over by a truck. Later that day, Ned also revived his mother after she suddenly died of a brain aneurysm, but soon discovered that his gift had consequences when Chuck's father died next door in exchange. Ned discovered the other effect of his gift later that night, when his mother kissed him goodnight and died a second time. During their respective parents' funerals, Ned and Chuck kissed—the first time for both of them. After the funeral, Ned's father dropped him off at the Longborough School for Boys, and never returned or contacted him again except to say that he had moved.

Ned continued to test his gift, learning its limitations and rules by such experiments as reviving a jarful of fireflies. After finishing school, Ned opened his own restaurant, The Pie Hole, a restaurant specializing in pies. Ned lives above the restaurant in an apartment, next door to his employee, Olive Snook, who is not aware of his ability. Olive is jealous of Chuck's romance with Ned, but despite her many attempts to attract him, he doesn't reciprocate, though a couple of near-death experiences have prompted suspicions that he may have stronger feelings for her than he initially thought. (Season 1, Episode 5)

=== Relationship with Chuck ===
Ned grew up in the village of Coeur d'Coeurs, next door to a girl named Charlotte Charles, nicknamed "Chuck", on whom he had a childhood crush. During the pilot episode Ned and Emerson hear of a woman being murdered on a cruise ship, with a $50,000 reward for solving the crime. Ned learns that the woman is Chuck, whom he had not seen for almost 20 years. He revives her to ask her who killed her, but discovers that she doesn't know. He is about to touch her but cannot bring himself to do it, allowing her to live instead and inadvertently causing the larcenous funeral director to die. Chuck and Ned soon develop strong feelings for each other and begin a relationship; however, they cannot touch at all, as doing so would cause Chuck to die. However, Ned and Chuck find other ways to express affection: they kiss each other while encased in body bags and while holding a sheet of plastic wrap between their lips. Ned installed a glass window with a rubber glove in his car so she could sit next to him and hold his hand without touching it, and at another point, (Season 1, Episode 4) Chuck holds a prosthetic hand, pretending it's Ned's. With Chuck's presence encouraging him to take a greater role in life, Ned begins to become more involved in Emerson's cases, occasionally going undercover with Emerson and Chuck while searching for further information about the case; on one occasion (Season 2, Episode 8) he has even solved a murder aided only by Olive, Emerson and Chuck being otherwise occupied.

== Personality ==
Due to Ned's power, he rarely touches people and dislikes physical contact. He also seems to fear any sort of change, at one point saying (Season 1, Episode 7 - Smell of Success) that he prefers to be "tightly wound" instead of a "shapeless mass with room for surprises" though Chuck points out that she was a surprise and he made room for her.

== Wardrobe ==
According to costume designer Robert Blackman, who won a Costume Designers Guild Award and an Emmy for his work on the show, in order to keep Ned at the center of the viewer's attention in a show that features a "dizzying backdrop of hyper-saturated colors and storybook locations", Blackman limited Ned's wardrobe to "solid blacks, grays and whites."

== Critical reception ==
Lee Pace has received largely positive reviews from critics, who have described him as "an immensely likable lead, full of childlike vulnerability and almost palpable longing" and "endearing but not too cute", though he was also described as "overly slow-witted". Pace has been praised for his acting with Anna Friel, who portrays Chuck; critics have said that "[they] are so darn adorable together" and that "the chemistry between [them] is undeniable".

== Origin ==
Ned was going to be a character on Dead Like Me. He was going to contrast with the grim reapers by bringing people back to life. However, Ned never made it into the show so the creator kept the idea until developing Pushing Daisies.
