= List of Pushing Daisies episodes =

Pushing Daisies is an American comedy-drama television series created by Bryan Fuller that aired on ABC. It premiered in the United States on ABC on October 3, 2007; in Canada on October 2, 2007, on CTV; and aired in the UK on ITV.

== Series overview ==
Season	Episodes	Originally released	
Season	Episodes	First released	Last released
1	9	October 3, 2007	December 12, 2007
2	13	October 1, 2008	June 13, 2009

== Episodes ==
=== Season 1 (2007) ===
Due to the 2007–08 Writers Guild of America strike, this season consisted of only nine episodes. The episodes aired a day earlier in Canada on CTV before their air dates in the United States.

No. overall	No. in season	Title	Directed by	Written by	Original release date	Prod. code	US viewers (millions)
1	1	"Pie-lette"	Barry Sonnenfeld	Bryan Fuller	October 3, 2007	276027	12.83
Ned owns and operates a pie bakery and seems to lead a perfectly normal life. This, however, is far from the truth. Ned can, with the touch of his hand, wake people from the dead. But another touch will kill them again, for good, and if he keeps them alive for more than a minute, someone else in close proximity dies. He decides to use this ability of his to solve crimes, but it grows complicated when he gives life to his childhood crush, Charlotte "Chuck" Charles, and decides to let her keep living.
2	2	"Dummy"	Barry Sonnenfeld	Peter Ocko	October 10, 2007	3T6501	10.07
Emerson gets annoyed with Chuck tailing him and Ned on their cases, while Ned refuses to share secrets with Chuck. For this instance, Ned revives Bernard Slaybeck, an auto safety specialist who was murdered in a hit-and-run. Before he can explain his death, Chuck breaks in with romantic questions. With the minute almost up, Bernard asks the team to give his last wishes to Jeanine (Riki Lindhome), a young woman who worked with him at Dandy Lion Industries. Soon, a mysterious murder plot involving a crash dummy costume, bodies in the testing room, and a car that runs on dandelion fuel comes to light.
3	3	"The Fun in Funeral"	Paul A. Edwards	Bryan Fuller	October 17, 2007	3T6502	9.75
Ned and Chuck speak to Lawrence Schatz, who they find out died one minute after Ned brought Chuck back to life. Meanwhile, Chuck decides to stay true to her original threat of baking anti-depressants into her aunts' food, in the form of Ned's pies. Olive unwillingly becomes the messenger in Chuck's plan and accidentally stumbles onto a secret about her unrequited lover's love.
4	4	"Pigeon"	Adam Kane	Rina Mimoun	October 24, 2007	3T6503	9.45
A plane crash into an apartment building leaves the trio with a case while Chuck finds herself drawn to the man who appears to be the sole survivor (Dash Mihok), much to Ned's distress. Olive takes a wounded messenger pigeon to the aunts for help. The Ned trio deduce that Dash is a prison escapee, and follow him to a windmill. The Olive trio follow the repaired pigeon to the same windmill. The case is solved, but Aunt Lily catches a fleeting glimpse of Chuck as she drives away; the glimpse is so fleeting, Lily believes it was just wishful thinking.
5	5	"Girth"	Peter O'Fallon	Katherine Lingenfelter	October 31, 2007	3T6504	8.58
In this Halloween episode, Emerson and Olive track down "the ghost" who's been killing the jockeys at the old race arena where Olive used to race as a former jockey herself. With help from Ned and Chuck, they try to solve the big mystery.
6	6	"Bitches"	Allan Kroeker	Chad Gomez Creasey & Dara Resnik Creasey	November 14, 2007	3T6505	8.88
When a deceased man (Joel McHale) tells Ned that his wife killed him after giving him a cup of coffee, he fails to mention that he is a polygamist, making the case harder than it sounds, with matters only becoming more complicated when Emerson falls for the prime suspect (Christine Adams) and Ned is left contemplating starting a physical relationship with Olive to complement the emotional one he has with Chuck.
7	7	"Smell of Success"	Lawrence Trilling	Scott Nimerfro	November 21, 2007	3T6506	7.52
The trio is called on to investigate the case of Anita Gray, loyal assistant to the olfactory scientist and aspiring novelist Napoleon LeNez. Sitting at her desk, Anita was leaning over to use her heightened sense of smell on a scratch-and-sniff book when suddenly, an explosion erupted from the book, completely engulfing her. Additional attempts on Lenez's life and incriminating evidence leads to the suspicion of Oscar Vibenius (Paul Reubens), former lab partner and bitter rival of Lenez. This rivalry leads to the belief that Vibenius is trying to prevent Lenez's book from being published. Elsewhere, Olive attempts to get Lily and Vivian back in the water. And, Vibenius begins an obsession with Chuck.
8	8	"Bitter Sweets"	Allan Kroeker	Abby Gewanter	November 28, 2007	3T6507	10.18
Emerson, Ned and Chuck investigate the death of Tony DiNapoli, who appears to have been strangled by a woman. However, when Ned brings Tony back to life to find out who killed him, Tony claims it was Burly Bruce Carter, via the hands of his "girlfriend" who is a RealDoll. Meanwhile, business at the Pie Hole plummets when a new candy store run by Dilly (Molly Shannon) and Billy Balsam (Mike White) opens in town with the situation becoming more complicated when Ned discovers one of the owners dead in a large vat of candy. And Alfredo (Raúl Esparza) continues to pursue an oblivious Olive who, herself, continues to pine after the Pie Maker.
9	9	"Corpsicle"	Brian Dannelly	Lisa Joy	December 12, 2007	3T6508	6.84
When Chuck disappears after discovering Ned’s connection to her father’s death, Ned finds her with Olive, but she refuses to go back home with him. Meanwhile, Oscar Vibenius continues his attempt to figure out why Chuck smells so different. It’s New Year’s, and Emerson and Ned investigate the death of an adjuster from the Über-Life Life Insurance Agency who was found in a snow bank. Lily suffers from hallucinations after Olive inadvertently overdoses a pie with Chuck's homeopathic mood enhancer.

=== Season 2 (2008–09) ===
Pushing Daisies was renewed for a second season in February 2008 by ABC for the 2008–09 television season. On November 20, 2008, after six episodes were broadcast, ABC canceled the show. A total of thirteen episodes were produced for the season, with four of them broadcast in November and December. The final three episodes premiered world wide on German free-to-air television network ProSieben and were later broadcast in the U.S. on Saturdays starting May 30 and ending on June 13, 2009, to promote the release of the Season 2 DVD. Several of the first 10 episodes aired a day earlier in Canada on A before their air dates in the United States. The final three episodes were first broadcast in the UK in April 2009 prior to airing in the U.S.

No. overall	No. in season	Title	Directed by	Written by	Original release date	Prod. code	US viewers (millions)
10	1	"Bzzzzzzzzz!"	Adam Kane	Bryan Fuller	October 1, 2008	3T7053	6.32
Chuck goes undercover as a "Bee Girl" at a honey-based cosmetics company after their new spokesmodel is stung to death. She soon discovers that office politics are killer (literally) between the founder (Missi Pyle) and the new owner. Meanwhile, Ned can't stand her growing independence or the fact that she wants to move out of his apartment. In other developments, Lily spirits Olive off to a nunnery so she won't spill Lily's deep, dark secret.
11	2	"Circus, Circus"	Lawrence Trilling	Peter Ocko	October 8, 2008	3T7051	5.55
Georgeann Heaps (Rachael Harris) hires Emerson to find her missing daughter who has apparently run away, and the trail leads to a circus surrounded by murder in the form of several dead clowns. Meanwhile, Ned and Chuck try to deal with the change in their relationship, and Olive considers staying longer at the nunnery.
12	3	"Bad Habits"	Peter O'Fallon	Gretchen J. Berg & Aaron Harberts	October 15, 2008	3T7052	6.29
Olive calls on the Pie Maker and Emerson to solve a suspicious suicide of a fellow nun, Sister Larue (Mo Collins) that she believes was murdered. Meanwhile, Chuck tries to fill in her family tree and considers what to do in the present with her new lease on life.
13	4	"Frescorts"	Peter Lauer	Story by : Lisa Joy; Teleplay by : Lisa Joy and Gretchen J. Berg & Aaron Harberts	October 22, 2008	3T7054	5.67
When the most popular escort at a rent-a-friend agency turns up dead, the team investigates who killed him, including likely suspect Randy Mann (David Arquette), the guy's antisocial, taxidermy-loving roommate. Meanwhile, Emerson's famed private investigator mom, Calista Cod (Debra Mooney), pays an unexpected visit and does a little snooping of her own.
14	5	"Dim Sum Lose Some"	Lawrence Trilling	Davey Holmes	October 29, 2008	3T7055	6.64
The wife of a murdered chef, Bao Di, hires Emerson to investigate the death of her husband. So Ned, Emerson, Chuck, and Olive all go undercover at the Chinese restaurant where the murder took place. Meanwhile, Ned encounters a mysterious man who claims to have ties to his past, and Emerson is reunited with polygamist widow Simone Hundin (Christine Adams).
15	6	"Oh Oh Oh... It's Magic"	Adam Kane	Katherine Lingenfelter	November 19, 2008	3T7056	4.86
Famed magician The Great Herrmann (Fred Willard) hires Emerson Cod to come to the Conjurer's Castle to track down the killer of his animal assistants. Meanwhile, Ned makes a discovery of his own at the Castle involving his newly found half-brothers.
16	7	"Robbing Hood"	Paul Shapiro	Jim Danger Gray	November 26, 2008	3T7057	4.45
A lawyer for the late Gustav Hoffer (Shelley Berman) suspects his client's death was not part of a robbery gone wrong as was reported, but rather murder. He hires Emerson Cod and Ned to find out who killed Hoffer. Meanwhile, Dwight Dixon (Stephen Root) romances Vivian (much to the disgust of Lily), and discovers that Chuck is still alive.
17	8	"Comfort Food"	Peter Lauer	Doug Petrie	December 3, 2008	3T7058	4.91
Ned and Olive compete at the Papen County Comfort Food Cook-Off, where Ned brings back to life Colonel Likkin, who was mysteriously deep fried to death. His world-famous original recipe has gone missing and Likkin asks Ned to find who stole it, forcing Ned and Olive to tackle a case without Emerson's detective expertise for the first time. Meanwhile, Chuck saves her father (Josh Randall) by tricking Ned, and is overcome by guilt. Turning to Emerson, the two try to find the person who died while in proximity.
18	9	"The Legend of Merle McQuoddy"	Lawrence Trilling	Chad Gomez Creasey & Dara Resnik Creasey	December 10, 2008	3T7059	4.96
The Papen County Lighthouse keeper, Nora McQuoddy, is discovered dead, and her son hires Emerson to find the killer. Meanwhile, Charles Charles pays a visit, but his continued demands for Ned to leave Chuck and his rejection of Ned's attempt to impose rules on his second chance of life result in Chuck being forced to choose between the two.
19	10	"The Norwegians"	Tricia Brock	Scott Nimerfro	December 17, 2008	3T7060	4.82
Ned, Chuck, and Emerson finally meet their match when three rival Norwegian detectives (Orlando Jones, Ivana Miličević, Michael Weaver) start to get in their way after Vivian hires them to investigate the disappearance of Dwight Dixon, with matters becoming increasingly complicated as Ned and Chuck try to find the missing Charles Charles and Olive apparently betrays the team to join the Norwegians. The Norwegians have a van they call "Mother" which the license plate states, but it is technically MILF, a Mobile Investigation Laboratory Facility.
20	11	"Window Dressed to Kill"	Julie Anne Robinson	Abby Gewanter	March 4, 2009 (Germany); April 17, 2009 (UK); May 30, 2009 (USA)	3T7062	2.35
Erin Embry, window dresser extraordinaire for Dicker's department store, is killed and Chuck manages to get the Pie Hole gang on the case. Erin's fans think it was her window-dressing partner, Coco Juniper (Constance Zimmer), who did the deed. Apparently the two artistic minds did not always meet. Meanwhile, Ned refuses to use his zapping ability which causes him a small crisis of identity as he tries to establish his old identity, with matters becoming further complicated when the arrival of two old 'friends' (Richard Benjamin, George Segal) of Olive forces Ned to pose as her fiance due to her having referred to him as such in her letters to them.
21	12	"Water & Power"	Dean White	Story by : Lisa Joy & Jim Danger Gray; Teleplay by : Peter Ocko	March 11, 2009 (Germany); April 29, 2009 (UK); June 6, 2009 (USA)	3T7061	2.29
Lila Robinson (Gina Torres), a beautiful grifter from Emerson's past resurfaces, revealing a painful secret that Emerson has kept hidden all these years. Now on the lam for murder, Lila promises Emerson a quid pro quo if he clears her name.
22	13	"Kerplunk"	Lawrence Trilling	Gretchen J. Berg & Aaron Harberts	March 11, 2009 (Germany); May 1, 2009 (UK); June 13, 2009 (USA)	3T7063	2.23
In the series finale, the past becomes the present when one half of the Darling Mermaid Darlings' arch rivals, the Aquadolls (Wendie Malick, Nora Dunn), is killed. In order to find the murderer, the Darling Mermaid Darlings must come out of retirement with Ned as their manager and Olive as their stylist. Chuck cannot participate. Olive gets close to Sid, with whom she shares her experiences in gender discrimination, what with him being a male synchronized swimmer and her attending Vassar on a jockey scholarship.
