= Birdhouse in Your Soul =

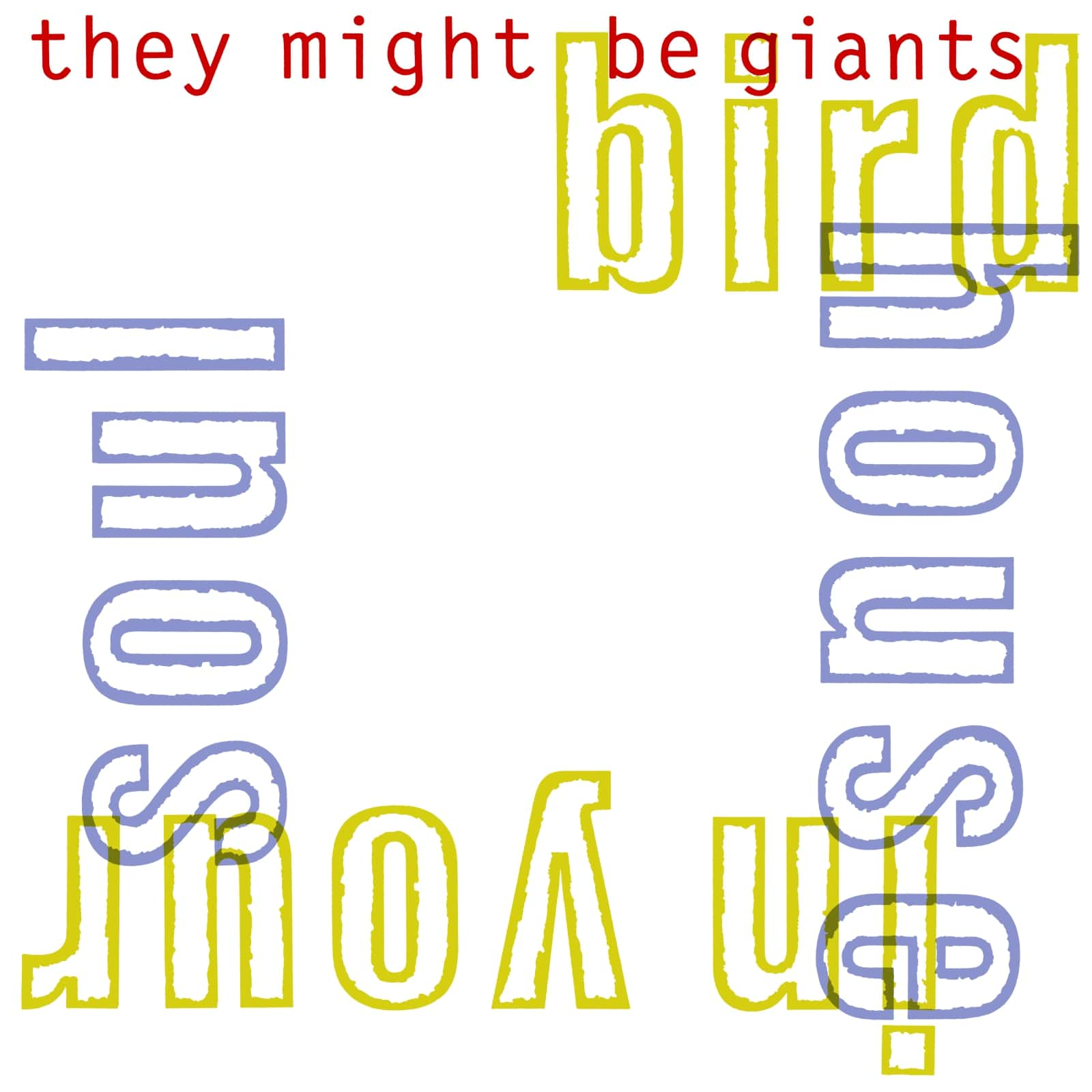

Single by They Might Be Giants

from the album Flood
- B-side: "Hot Cha"; "Hearing Aid"; "Ant"
- Released: December 19, 1989
- Recorded: Fall 1989
- Genre: Rock; pop; new wave
- Length: 3:19
- Label: Elektra (US); Elektra / WEA (EU)
- Songwriters: John Flansburgh, John Linnell
- Producers: Clive Langer & Alan Winstanley

They Might Be Giants singles chronology
"Purple Toupee" (1989)	"Birdhouse in Your Soul" (1989)	"Istanbul (Not Constantinople)" (1990)

Audio sample
- file; help

Music video
- Birdhouse in Your Soul on YouTube

"Birdhouse in Your Soul" is a song by American alternative rock band They Might Be Giants. It was released in late 1989 through Elektra Records as the lead single from the album Flood, making the single the band's first release on a major label. "Birdhouse in Your Soul" is the band's highest-charting single in both the United States and the United Kingdom, and is one of their best-known songs.

The song's lyrics are narrated from the perspective of a nightlight in the shape of a blue canary. It includes an atypical snare drum pattern and modulation among four keys.

== Background ==
"Birdhouse in Your Soul" was one of four songs on Flood produced by Clive Langer and Alan Winstanley; these four songs alone exhausted two-thirds of the album's budget. The track was selected early for a release as a single. An early two-minute demo version of the song was made available by the band via its Dial-A-Song service a year before they signed with Elektra.

== Recording and composition ==
=== Lyrics ===
The melody to "Birdhouse in Your Soul" was written several years prior to its recording for Flood. John Linnell has stated that he "shoehorned" the song's lyrics into the existing melody. The lyrics are hyper-associative, rapidly connecting disparate topics such as Jason and the Argonauts and The Longines Symphonette. Elizabeth Sandifer and S. Alexander Reed have noted movement between lyrical themes is a recurring motif throughout Flood. However, Linnell has commented that he feels the lyrics ultimately sound like stand-in "dummy lyrics".

=== Music ===
"Birdhouse in Your Soul" has an unconventional drum beat, which was programmed by Linnell, wherein the snare drum sounds on every beat. During production, Linnell created a demo using a more standard pop drum beat with the snare drum only on the backbeats. However, Langer and Winstanley emphatically rejected this change, which Linnell credits as saving the song.

Musically, Reed and Sandifer note that the song makes an unanticipated jump from its initial key of C major to E♭ major, and then back to C major. They call the album in general "modular" in its movement between musical ideas and note that this may be a product of the album's largely digital composition and production. The track's later shifts to F♯ minor and A major divide the octave into equal intervals. The music also interpolates elements of "Summer in the City" by The Lovin' Spoonful. The car horn-like trumpet sound in the bridge of "Birdhouse in Your Soul" recalls the sounds of traffic in "Summer in the City" and both songs use similar rhythms in their chord progressions. Linnell states that these references were inspired by the intense heat during the album's recording in the summer of 1989.

== Music video ==
The music video for "Birdhouse in Your Soul" was directed by Adam Bernstein and filmed in New York County's Surrogate's Courthouse building in Manhattan in 1989. The video features Linnell and Flansburgh dancing and performing erratically amidst a group of dancers dressed in red plaid shirts. In the video, the dancers wear masks made from sunglasses affixed with an image of the eyes of William Allen White, whose face is used frequently in the band's visual material.

In an article on They Might Be Giants music videos, Emily Petermann speculates that the zombie-like behavior of the dancers, coupled with the video's warehouse setting, evokes "oppressed factory workers". Petermann finds this view to be at odds with the song's "cheerful" music. On the other hand, the "non sequitur" lyrics and "surreal" musical elements—such as modulation—are complemented by moments of "nonsense" in the video, such as when "[Linnell and Flansburgh's] performance becomes embedded in a bizarre situation or the performance is abandoned altogether".

== Reception and promotion ==
"Birdhouse in Your Soul" received positive attention from critics. In his review of Flood for AllMusic, Stephen Thomas Erlewine called it one of the band's "finest singles". Reviewing the single alone, Stewart Mason elaborates that, compared to previous releases, the high production value highlights Linnell's and Flansburgh's "knack for dynamics and arrangement". Mason also speculates that the song's popularity stems from the modest depth of its lyric, which is somewhat oblique on the surface but ultimately "easy to figure out", giving the listener a sense of pride in their understanding. Chris Willman, writing for the Los Angeles Times, predicted the track would become a "college radio standard".

=== Performances ===
In April 1990, They Might Be Giants appeared on The Tonight Show Starring Johnny Carson to promote the release of Flood. As part of the appearance, Linnell and Flansburgh performed "Birdhouse in Your Soul" with Doc Severinsen and the Tonight Show Band. Severinsen's unusually fast count-in resulted in a performance with a noticeably faster tempo than the album recording. The band adopted a similar tempo for subsequent live performances.

=== Commercial performance ===
"Birdhouse in Your Soul" peaked at No. 3 on the United States Modern Rock Tracks chart and No. 6 on the UK Singles Chart. It is They Might Be Giants' highest-charting single in both countries. In 2010, the song was featured in an advertisement for Clarks shoes; the song returned to the UK singles chart for three weeks, peaking at No. 70.

== Personnel ==
They Might Be Giants

- John Flansburgh – guitar
- John Linnell – vocals, keyboards

Additional musicians

- Mark Feldman – violin
- Frank London – trumpet (sampled)

Production

- Clive Langer – producer
- Alan Winstanley – producer
- Roger Moutenot – engineer, mixing

== Charts ==
=== Weekly charts ===
Chart (1990)	Peak position
Australia (ARIA)	125
Ireland (IRMA)	12
UK Singles (Official Charts)	6
US Alternative Airplay (Billboard)	3

=== Year-end charts ===
Chart (1990)	Position
US Modern Rock Tracks (Billboard)	28

== Certifications ==
Region	Certification	Certified units/sales
United Kingdom (BPI)	Silver	200,000^{‡}
^{‡} Sales+streaming figures based on certification alone.

== Cover versions ==
A cover of "Birdhouse in Your Soul" was featured in the Pushing Daisies episode "Pigeon", which premiered on October 24, 2007. This version was arranged and performed by series composer Jim Dooley with vocals from actors Kristin Chenoweth and Ellen Greene. The cover also appears on the show's official soundtrack. In a 2015 Decider article revisiting the episode, Joe Reid wrote that the selection of "Birdhouse in Your Soul" contributed to "a moment that must have felt tailor-made for the audience members who responded to it".

The song was also covered by Neil Cicierega as Lemon Demon on his second album, Live From the Haunted Candle Shop, which was released on July 23, 2003. The cover is 129 BPM, which is 29 faster than the original at 100 BPM.

In 2011, American indie rock band Titus Andronicus performed a cover of the song for The A.V. Club's A.V. Undercover web series.
