= List of Pushing Daisies characters =

This is a list of fictional characters from the ABC television series Pushing Daisies.

== Main characters ==
=== Ned ===
Ned (Lee Pace) is a 29-year-old pie maker with a unique magical ability to bring back to life anyone or anything that is dead. He owns his own pie restaurant, called The Pie Hole, and also uses his gift to aid Emerson Cod, a private investigator, by bringing dead people back to life to find out how they died, though they can only stay alive for one minute before something else must die in their place.

Ned had a childhood crush on his neighbor, Charlotte "Chuck" Charles. The two shared a first kiss at the neighboring funerals of Chuck's father and Ned's mother, but the two lost touch immediately afterwards when Ned was sent away to boarding school by his father. Twenty years later, Ned learns of an unaccompanied female tourist, dubbed the "lonely tourist", murdered on a cruise ship, and soon discovers that the woman is his long-lost love. He revives Chuck at the funeral home to ask her who killed her, but cannot bring himself to re-dead her when her minute of life is up, allowing her to live instead (and inadvertently causing the larcenous funeral director to die in her place.)

Chuck and Ned soon develop strong feelings for each other and begin a relationship; however, they cannot touch at all, as doing so would kill Chuck. However, Ned and Chuck find other ways to express affection: they kiss each other while encased in body bags and while holding a sheet of plastic wrap between their lips.

The character of Ned as a nine-year-old is played by Field Cate.

=== Charlotte "Chuck" Charles ===
Charlotte Charles (Anna Friel), usually called Chuck, is Ned's childhood neighbor and boyhood crush. Raised by her two agoraphobic aunts, Chuck is murdered on a cruise ship under mysterious circumstances. Ned brings her back to life, but his feelings for her prevent him from rescinding the usually-temporary resurrection; the two enter a renewed relationship with each other, although Ned has to be very careful not to touch her again. She has a wealth of information on odd and uncommon topics due to reading a large variety of books while growing up in a relatively repressed environment. She can also speak various languages such as French, German, Swedish, Chinese and Japanese. She is an avid beekeeping enthusiast. She has a kind, free-spirited nature which contrasts Ned's more aloof demeanor.

When Olive Snook went to the convent, Chuck moved into Olive's apartment, which neighbors Ned's, to work on developing her own life after her resurrection. She later becomes Olive's roommate after Olive returned from the convent, also revealing that Chuck's aunt Lily was actually her mother.

Eight-year-old Chuck is played by actress Sammi Hanratty.

=== Emerson Cod ===
Emerson Cod (Chi McBride) is the private detective who enlists the help of the pie-maker in solving murder cases. He is also an avid knitter and knits in stressful circumstances.

In the final episode of the first season, it is revealed that Emerson has a daughter whom he has not seen in 7 years. To this end, he authors a pop-up book entitled Lil' Gumshoe designed to help her find her way home. After several publisher rejections and sharp criticism from his mother, Emerson rewrites it and is finally accepted for publication. He is reunited with his former lover, Lila Robinson who makes a deal with him: to help her get the police off her back or he'll never see his daughter, Penny again. Emerson agrees and keeps this deal, but only seeing her briefly as a car drives away. In the second season, Emerson is in a relationship with Simone Hundin. In the series finale, Emerson is reunited with his daughter after she reads Lil' Gumshoe.

Young Emerson is played by Steven Wash Jr.

=== Narrator ===
The narrator (voiced by Jim Dale) is an omniscient voice who narrates the series, commonly beginning the expositions about case information with the phrase "The facts were these". The voice also lists any measurement of time (people's ages, intervals since a particular event, or how long ago something happened) to the minute.

=== Lily and Vivian Charles ===
Lily (Swoosie Kurtz) and Vivian Charles (Ellen Greene) are Charlotte's aunts and only living family.

In their teen years the two sisters were an internationally famous synchronized swimming duo called the "Darling Mermaid Darlings." Both sisters are agoraphobic, bird lovers, and connoisseurs of fine cheese. They also suffer from separation anxiety, as demonstrated in their unusual practice of stuffing their pet birds after they die. Vivian also confesses to Ned that she sometimes puts pillows in Charlotte's bed and pretends she is sleeping.

=== Olive Snook ===
Olive Snook (Kristin Chenoweth) is the waitress at Ned's restaurant and his next-door neighbor. She is romantically interested in Ned but is often thwarted from pursuing her interest, due at first to the piemaker's social aversion and later to Chuck "faking her own death" and coming out of nowhere.

When she is faced with a "relationship" problem with Ned, she breaks into song. The first time she sings in the series is in the episode "Dummy," she sings "Hopelessly Devoted To You," from Grease. The narrator introduced her singing as follows: "Olive often imagined there was an orchestra in her heart. Music heard only by her except when her heart broke open and it spilled out into the world." In the end, Olive begins a relationship with a taxidermist named Randy Mann. Nine-year-old Olive is played by Samantha Bailey in "Bad Habits" and Ellery Sprayberry in "Window Dressed to Kill."

Kristin Chenoweth won the Primetime Emmy Award for Outstanding Supporting Actress in a Comedy Series for her role as Olive Snook.

=== Digby ===
Digby is Ned's Golden Retriever, who was hit by an 18-wheeler truck and subsequently becomes the first creature that the young Ned brings back to life. The fact that Digby is still alive and well twenty years later would seem to suggest that the resurrection suspends the aging process, but this has yet to be confirmed (however, there may be a slight possibility that any corpse revived by Ned will continue to live so long as he does not touch them again). The pie maker pets Digby with a fake arm, because if he were to touch Digby again, Digby would be dead forever. The dog is intelligent enough to understand this, and avoids touching Ned himself. Digby also spends a significant amount of his time with Olive.

Digby is played by two dogs, Orbit and Orion.

== Recurring characters ==
=== The Coroner ===
The Coroner (Sy Richardson) works at the City Morgue where Ned, Emerson, and Chuck inspect (and secretly interrogate) dead bodies. He is often suspicious of all three of them and voices it by simply saying, "Mmmmmm-hmmmm." He has started hitting up Emerson for bribe money to keep quiet about his inspections. Emerson reluctantly pays him, but only because he believes it's simply for business. Series creator Bryan Fuller planned a slow reveal of the coroner's homosexuality and his crush on Emerson Cod (Chi McBride).

=== Alfredo Aldarisio ===
Alfredo Aldarisio (Raúl Esparza) is a homeopathic remedies salesman who has a fear that Earth's atmosphere could be sucked away from space and treats himself with his own herbal wares. He secretly admires Olive Snook and gave Chuck a sample pack of antidepressants. Olive also secretly admires him, even though she still longs for the Pie Maker, but she has not yet had a chance to tell him this due to his going away on a trip.

=== Oscar Vibenius ===
Oscar Vibenius (Paul Reubens) is an olfactory expert who works for the Department of Water and Power. He was almost framed by his former partner, Napoleon LeNez, for attempting to kill him, when in fact LeNez was staging his own attempts to try to publicize his latest book. He becomes intrigued with Chuck after noticing something slightly different in her scent, and he stole her mother's sweater to further investigate his suspicions. In "Corpsicle", Chuck gave him a sample of her hair so that he could continue his investigation into her scent, but he returned it to her without testing it in an effort to gain her trust. Beforehand, he had also shaved Digby's behind, as he was also interested in his peculiar scent.

=== Simone Hundin ===
Simone Hundin (Christine Adams) is a dog breeder whose husband was murdered in "Bitches". During the investigation- which was complicated as the victim mentioned he was killed by his wife in his last minute 'alive' before revealing that he was a polygamist- she and Emerson became romantically interested in one another, but nothing became of it. Later on, during an investigation in "Dim Sum, Lose Some", the two of them run into each other and become involved. However, Emerson is frightened by the degree of control she has over him, and tries to avoid her. Simone gets angry, and tells him off (and indirectly solves the case). Impressed by how she had opened up, Emerson apologized to Simone, and the two of them got back together. She appeared again in "Water and Power" where she and Emerson Cod are in a relationship.

=== Dwight Dixon ===
Dwight Dixon (Stephen Root) was a friend of Charles Charles's and Ned's fathers from the army. He shows up at the Pie Hole after being released from prison, searching for Ned's father.

=== Maurice and Ralston ===
Maurice and Ralston (Alex and Graham Miller (adults), Conner and Keenan Merkovich (Age 12), Jason and Kristopher Simmons (Age 5)) are the half-brothers of Ned. As adults they are both magicians.

=== Ned's mother ===
Ned's mother (Tina Gloss Finnell) appears only in flashbacks. She died from a brain aneurysm while baking a pie for Ned in the kitchen of their home. Ned brought her back to life for more than one minute and as a consequence, accidentally killed Chuck's father, Charles Charles. That night, Ned's Mother tucked him into his bed and gave him a goodnight kiss, one that ended up being her very last. This is how Ned learned the rules of his powers: First touch, life, second touch, dead again—forever.

=== Ned's father ===
After his mother died, Ned's father (Jon Eric Price in all other episodes, a stand-in in "Bzzzzzzz!") sent him away to the Longborough School for Boys in the town of North Thrush. His parting words to him were "I'll be back".

=== Calista Cod ===
Calista Cod (Debra Mooney and Amelia Borella, Amelia plays young Calista). She has only appeared in one episode called "Frescorts." She is Emerson's Mom/Best Friend (As explained by Emerson).

=== Charles Charles ===
Charles Charles is the father of Lonely Tourist Charlotte Charles who is found dead while watering his lawn. His death is due to Ned keeping his mother alive for over a minute, and he is the life who died in her place.

Ned decided to revive him to press for more information on Dwight Dixon. When he did, Chuck kept him alive by tricking Ned to touch his gloved hand and he is hidden in Ned's old house. Charles decided to leave town when he did not get along with Ned.

Charles was played by a stand-in in the "Pie-lette", and was played by Josh Randall in "Comfort Food" and "The Legend of Merle McQuoddy".

=== Pigby ===
Pigby (played by "Fiona") is a pot-bellied sow whom Olive befriends at the nunnery. She often hunts for truffles with Olive and once unintentionally killed Olive's best friend there. When Olive returns home, she got to take Pigby with her. Pigby's name rhymes with the name of Ned's golden retriever, Digby.

=== Other characters ===
Other recurring roles include Eugene Mulchandani and Ingmar, who are classmates of Ned in the boarding school, are seen in flashbacks at the beginning of every episode. Other minor recurring roles are the unnamed delivery boy and the news anchor, played by Leyna Nguyen.
