= Pie-lette =

- Pushing Daisies episode
- Ned and Chuck walk to their first kiss
- Episode no.: Season 1 Episode 1
- Directed by: Barry Sonnenfeld
- Written by: Bryan Fuller
- Production code: 276027
- Original air date: October 2, 2007

Guest appearance
- Patrick Breen

Episode chronology
← Previous —	Next → "Dummy"

"Pie-lette" (Note: A parody of "Pilot" as in television pilot.) is the series premiere of the American comedy-drama television series Pushing Daisies. The episode aired a day earlier in Canada than the United States.

== Plot ==
Ned is a young man who can revive the dead with his touch, though if they remain alive for more than a minute someone nearby will die. A second touch will bring permanent death.

Ned discovers his ability as a child when his touch brings his dog back to life. He later learns of the conditions of his ability when his mother dies of an aneurysm, and he revives her for more than a minute, inadvertently killing the father of his childhood sweetheart, Charlotte Charles, nicknamed "Chuck" by Ned. His mother dies when she kisses him goodnight. Ned's father soon leaves. At their parents, simultaneous funeral, Ned and Chuck share a first kiss, before parting. Ned is sent to boarding school, and Chuck to live with her aunts, the reclusive Lily and Vivian Charles.

Approximately 20 years later, Ned owns a bakery, the Pie Hole. He uses his ability to purchase old fruit and return it to the condition of when it was first picked, using them in his pies. An employee and neighbor, Olive Snook, has a crush on Ned, but is rebuffed after taking from his childhood that he should avoid becoming attached to people. His childhood dog, Digby, is still alive, since Ned has only touched him with objects from a distance. At night, Ned works as the partner of Emerson Cod, a private investigator who discovers Ned's ability by accident. Emerson realizes they can profitably solve murders by reviving murder victims and asking who their killer was.

One day, Ned learns that Chuck has been murdered on a cruise ship. He travels with Emerson to Ned's hometown and revives Chuck, who is happy to be reunited but does not know her killer. Not wanting Chuck to die again, Ned does not kill her within a minute, causing the death of the immoral funeral director, Lawrence Schatz, instead. Ned hides Chuck in the coffin, and retrieves her after the funeral, bringing her to stay in his apartment. Despite shared romantic feelings, they cannot touch, and they engage in a series of touches mediated by objects, such as kissing through plastic wrap and holding hands wearing gloves.

Chuck is happy, and approaches Ned and Emerson with a plan to solve her own murder and collect the reward. They travel to a travel agent where the manager had offered Chuck a free cruise if she transported a pair of plaster monkeys, though they find Deedee dead on arrival. Despite bringing her back to life, Deedee dies before identifying her killer. The three realize that if Chuck died on the cruise, the monkeys would have been inherited by her aunts, putting them in danger.

The three arrive, and Ned and Emerson talk to Chuck's aunts, while Chuck stays out of sight and climbs into her bedroom. As Lily goes upstairs to collect the monkeys for Ned, she is attacked as is Ned. Chuck rescues him, and Lily shoots her assailant. Discovering the monkeys were made of gold, Lily and Vivian collect the reward for catching Chuck's killer and leave the house for the first time in years. Ned, Chuck, and Emerson agree to work together.

== Reception ==
Diane Werts of Newsday liked "Pie-lette," saying that it "stakes out a brave, broad swath of storytelling territory, and a potentially fertile one."—however, Werts didn't think it would automatically lead to Pushing Daisies success. Brian Lowry of Variety made similar comments in his review, saying that "Pie-lette" stood "head and shoulders above this fall's other seedlings," while being wary that Pushing Daisies "will collapse by episode four or five."

Some reviewers also commented on the appearance of the episode; Melanie McFarland of the Seattle Post-Intelligencer described the look of "Pie-lette" as similar to an "intricately illustrated children's book." However, Maureen Ryan, of the Chicago Tribune, felt that director Sonnenfeld's vivid style didn't "leave much room for heart."

The pilot received universal acclaim having a Metacritic score of 86, citing it as one of the best new shows of 2007.

The episode attracted 13 million viewers in the United States; it was the most-watched new series and 14th in overall viewership for the week.

== Accolades ==
Director Barry Sonnenfeld won the 2008 Directors Guild of America award for Outstanding Directorial Achievement in Comedy Series and for Outstanding Directing for a Comedy Series at the 60th Primetime Emmy Awards for the episode. Screenwriter Bryan Fuller was also nominated for a 2007 Writers Guild of America Award for Episodic Comedy and for Outstanding Writing for a Comedy Series at the 60th Primetime Emmy Awards.
