= Pigeon (Pushing Daisies) =

- Pushing Daisies episode
- Episode no.: Season 1 Episode 4
- Directed by: Adam Kane
- Written by: Rina Mimoun
- Production code: 3T6503
- Original air date: October 23, 2007

Guest appearances
- Dash Mihok, Jayma Mays, E.J. Callahan

Episode chronology
← Previous "The Fun in Funeral"	Next → "Girth"

"Pigeon" is the fourth episode of the first season of the American television comedy-drama Pushing Daisies. The episode—which features a duet version of the They Might Be Giants song "Birdhouse in Your Soul"—earned Jim Dooley a Primetime Emmy Award for Outstanding Music Composition for a Series. It attracted about 9.7 million viewers for its broadcast premiere in the United States.

== Plot ==
A plane crash into an apartment building leaves Emerson, Ned and Chuck investigating whether the pilot committed suicide. Chuck finds herself drawn to the man who appears to be the sole survivor (guest star Dash Mihok). Olive takes a wounded carrier pigeon to Chuck's aunts for help. Ned, Chuck and Emerson deduce that Dash is a prison escapee, and follow him to a windmill. Olive and the aunts follow the repaired pigeon to the same windmill. The case is solved, but Aunt Lily catches a fleeting glimpse of Chuck as Olive and the aunts drive away; the glimpse is so fleeting, Lily believes it was just wishful thinking.

== U.S. ratings ==
This episode aired the day after the ABC television network announced an order for a full 22-episode first season of the series. The full order was not a surprise, since the show had easily won its Wednesday lead-off time slot among adults 18-49 during each of the three previous airings, though that success was against the backdrop of an overall bad start for the new fall TV broadcasting season.

The episode competed against the first game of the 2007 World Series, losing to that sporting event but outdrawing the premiere of Phenomenon on NBC, as well as every other program that night.

== Writer's strike ==
The week the episode aired in the United States was also one in which screenwriters authorized their union leaders to call what in two weeks became the 2007–2008 Writers Guild of America strike. Entertainment Weekly later credited the strike for giving Pushing Daisies, a series with only moderate ratings success during its first season, a chance to relaunch with a 22 episode season order. Nine episodes had been written before the strike was called, and these nine would form the first, shortened, season. Nine months later, actress Kristin Chenoweth, who played Olive, cited the strike as one reason for the series being canceled in its second season (made up of the remaining 13 episodes delayed by the strike), though she speculated that other reasons may have also played a role.
