= The Tribe (1998 film) =

- Video cover
- Directed by: Stephen Poliakoff
- Written by: Stephen Poliakoff
- Starring: Joely Richardson; Jeremy Northam; Anna Friel; Jonathan Rhys-Meyers
- Distributed by: BBC; Deep City Films
- Release date: 21 June 1998
- Country: United Kingdom
- Language: English

The Tribe is a 1998 television film drama written and directed by Stephen Poliakoff and starring Joely Richardson, Jeremy Northam, Trevor Eve, Jonathan Rhys-Meyers and Anna Friel.

Property developer Northam is tasked with evicting a post-modern hippie proto-cult led by Richardson from a building. But they slowly win him over to their dark lifestyle, bizarre rituals, eating habits and dangerous liaisons.

The film was made in 1996, but not transmitted until 1998. Music is by Poliakoff regular Adrian Johnston and it carries some of the Polikov trademarks such as photograph studies.

Controversial for its nudity and a much discussed ménage à trois sex scene between characters played by Anna Friel (her first work after leaving Brookside), Jonathan Rhys Meyers and Jeremy Northam.

== Cast ==
- Joely Richardson as Emily
- Jeremy Northam as Jamie
- Anna Friel as Lizzie
- Trevor Eve as Kanahan
- Laura Fraser as Megan
- Jonathan Rhys Meyers as Adam
- Sean Francis as Lawrence
- Stephanie Buttle as Katrinna
- George Costigan as Micky
- Lynne Miller as Judith
- Emma Amos as Diana
- Rene Lawrence as Colin
- Michael Feast as Delario
- Julian Rhind-Tutt as Forester
- Kate Isitt as Caroline
- Rupert Penry-Jones as Dietrich
- Andreas Wisniewski as Lieutenant
- Togo Igawa as Japanese Businessman
- Kate Gartside as Mary
- Helen Lindsay as Emily's Mother
- Frank Mills as Emily's Father
- Rob Marni as Thug

== Production ==
Anna Friel admitted she was terrified at the thought of filming the sex scene with Jeremy Northam and Jonathan Rhys Meyers. She said: "On the day of the bedroom scenes, I got incredibly nervous. When I got on set, it was the most unsexy feeling I've ever had, but it wasn't nearly as bad as I thought it was going to be."
