= Anna Friel =

English actress (born 1976)

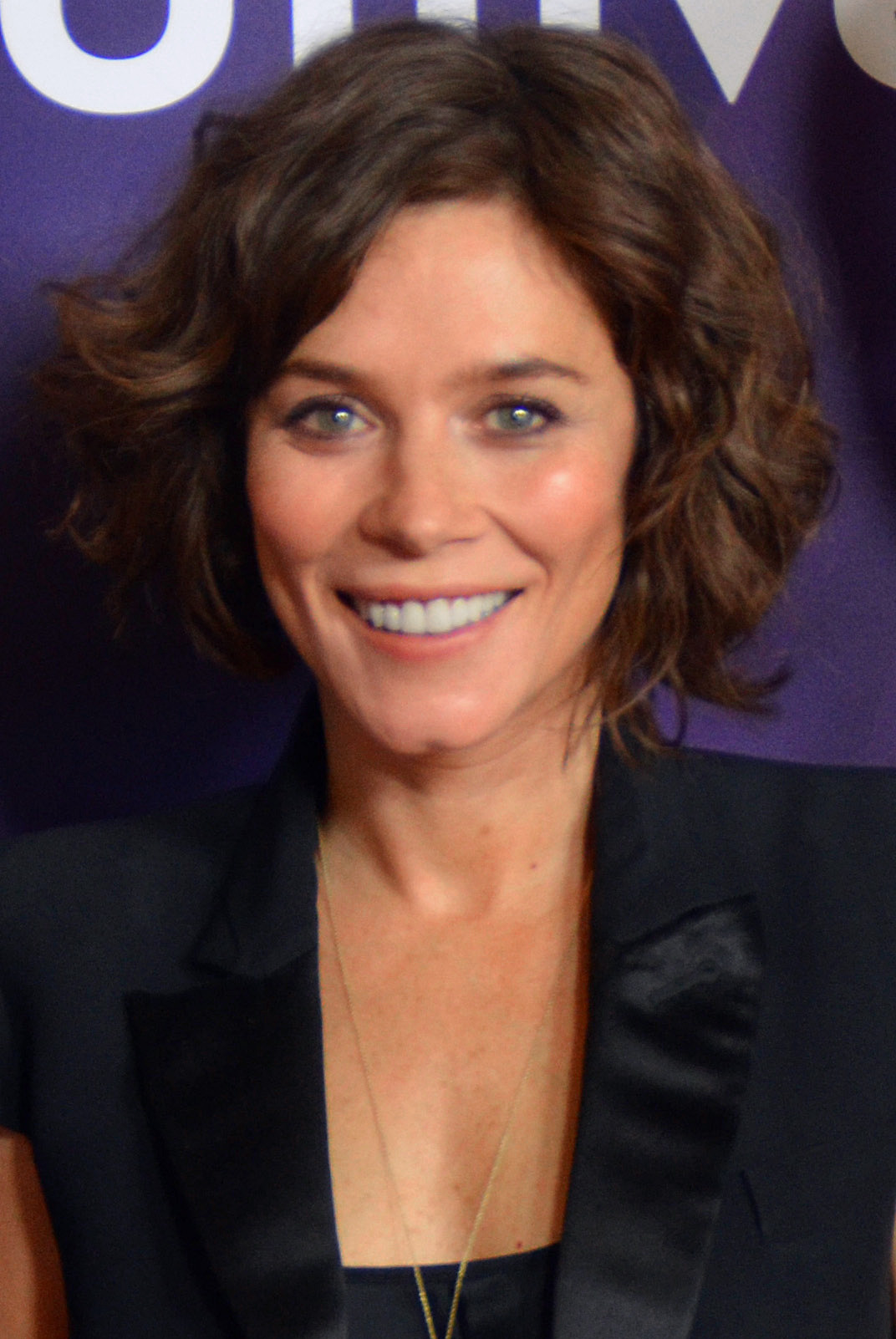
- Friel in 2015
- Born: Anna Louise Friel; 12 July 1976 (age 50); Rochdale, England
- Occupation: Actress
- Years active: 1990–present
- Partners: Darren Day (1994–1997); David Thewlis (2001–2010); Rhys Ifans (2011–2014)
- Children: 1

Anna Louise Friel (born 12 July 1976) is an English actress. She first achieved fame as Beth Jordache in the British soap opera Brookside (1993–1995), later coming to wider prominence through her role as Charlotte "Chuck" Charles on Pushing Daisies (2007–2009), for which she received a nomination for the Golden Globe Award for Best Actress in a Comedy Series. In 2017, she won the International Emmy Award for Best Actress for her portrayal of the title character in the detective drama series Marcella (2016–2021). Her other accolades include a Drama Desk Award, an honorary degree, and a BAFTA nomination.

Friel made her feature film debut in 1998 with a leading role in The Land Girls. Subsequent credits include A Midsummer Night's Dream (1999), Me Without You (2001), Timeline (2003), Goal! (2005), Bathory (2008), Land of the Lost (2009), Limitless (2011), Books of Blood (2020), and Charming the Hearts of Men (2021). Her stage credits include Closer (Broadway, 1999), Breakfast at Tiffany's (West End, 2009), and Uncle Vanya (West End, 2012).

== Early life ==
Anna Louise Friel was born on 12 July 1976 in Rochdale, Greater Manchester. Her mother, Julie Bamford Friel (born 1952), is, as of 2020, a special education teacher. Her father, Desmond "Des" Friel (born 1951), was born in Belfast and raised in County Donegal, Ireland. He is a former French teacher and folk guitarist, who, as of 2020, owns a web design company. Her brother Michael is a doctor, who in his youth did television advertising work for Hovis.

Friel attended Crompton House CE Secondary School, an Anglican school; and later Holy Cross College, a Roman Catholic sixth form. She began her training as an actress at Oldham Theatre Workshop.

== Career ==
=== 1991–1999: Television work and film debut ===
Friel made her professional debut at age 13 in the television miniseries G.B.H., which aired in 1991 and was nominated for several BAFTAs. This led to small parts on the ITV soap operas Coronation Street and Emmerdale (1991; 1992). She was cast the following year as Beth Jordache in the Channel 4 soap opera Brookside, a role she played for two years. The character was involved in some of the series' most famous storylines, including the murder and covert burial of her abusive father, and the first ever pre-watershed lesbian kiss in British television history; a moment that went on to be broadcast around the world—including 76 countries where homosexuality is outlawed—when it featured during a montage at the 2012 Olympics opening ceremony. She later said, "For a very long time I was defined by that kiss. And I didn't want to be. I spent years turning down other lesbian roles because it felt like going back to Beth. [But it] did also make me want to take on parts that showed extreme sides of women". In 1995, Friel won a National Television Award in the category of "Most Popular Actress" for her work on Brookside.

Upon leaving the show (a decision she initially thought to be a "terrible mistake"), Friel was cast in a 1996 episode of Tales from the Crypt and appeared as one of the main characters in Stephen Poliakoff's television film The Tribe (1998), which attracted controversy for its inclusion of a ménage à trois sex scene. She then played leading roles in small-screen adaptations of Charles Dickens' Our Mutual Friend and Robert Louis Stevenson's St. Ives (both 1998), and co-starred in several British films, such as wartime period drama The Land Girls (1998), crime drama Rogue Trader (1999), and slapstick comedy Mad Cows (1999). While most were dismissive of Cows' eccentric humour, some critics felt that Friel's work as Australian expatriate Maddy was impressive. Next, she played Hermia in the 1999 film version of William Shakespeare's A Midsummer Night's Dream, saying later of the experience, "I think that [role] sort of changed things for me, especially in America, because the cast was really great—Kevin Kline, Michelle Pfeiffer, Christian Bale—and people started to think, 'if she's working with [those people] she must be doing well'".

During that same period, Friel made her Broadway debut in a production of Patrick Marber's Closer, which ran for 173 performances at the Music Box Theatre in New York (March–August 1999). In his review of the show for Variety, Charles Isherwood wrote:

It's the exquisitely lovely Friel who is the discovery here. Her Alice is both the nihilistic core of the play and its tender center, and the paradoxical mixture of toughness and fragility [she] brings to it are essential to the play's deepest truths. It's a star-making performance.

For her work as exotic dancer Alice, Friel won that year's Drama Desk Award for Outstanding Featured Actress in a Play.

=== 2000–2009: Stage roles, film work, and Pushing Daisies ===
Friel had leading roles in the comedy-drama films An Everlasting Piece and Sunset Strip (both 2000), with her performance in Piece attracting particular praise. The following year, she starred as the wife of a World War II soldier in the decently reviewed Canadian film The War Bride, for which she earned a Genie Award nomination for Best Actress, and co-headlined the coming-of-age drama Me Without You opposite Michelle Williams. In his appraisal of You for Variety, David Rooney said, "Of the central duo, Friel has the most difficult job, playing an essentially unsympathetic brat … But [she] continually tempers the negatives with a vulnerability and insecurity that redeem her". Between March and May 2001, Friel appeared in an adaptation of Frank Wedekind's Lulu at the Almeida Theatre; her West End stage debut. Describing her portrayal of the titular Victorian sex worker, theatre critic Nicholas de Jongh felt, "The appeal of Miss Friel's [performance] depends upon its restraint, guile and cool", noting that she mixes "child-like glee and naughtiness" with a "calm and callous" demeanour. The play transferred to the Kennedy Center in Washington, D.C. for one month following its run at the Almeida.

Friel's next roles were in the Irish television film Watermelon (2003), where she starred as a headstrong Dublin girl who travels to England for an abortion, and the Richard Donner fantasy adventure film Timeline (2003), where she played the love interest of the main character. She was then cast as Attorney Megan Delaney in The Jury, an American legal drama series that ran on Fox for a single season in 2004. Writing for The New York Times, Alessandra Stanley called the show "clever, innovative" and said of Friel, "hers is the most textured and persuasive character". Friel later admitted to finding the job—her first regular role on U.S. television—a challenge: "Everyone was saying, 'you will never believe how much hard work it is', and I was telling them not to worry because I'm used to it [but] my God were they right [...] You run off the set from one scene and get changed and run back on. It is so fast and so very well organised but it is hard, hard bloody work". Next, she played Geordie nurse Roz in the British-American sports drama Goal! (2005; a part she reprised in its sequel) and appeared as a recovering drug addict in the Toronto-set Niagara Motel (2006). In a mixed review of Motel, The Georgia Straight's Ken Eisner noted that Friel's performance carried "the most weight" in the film, while commending her "perfect local accent". In November 2006, she was awarded an honorary doctorate by the University of Bolton for contributions to the performing arts.

In 2007, Friel was cast as Charlotte "Chuck" Charles in Pushing Daisies, an American dramedy series created by Bryan Fuller, which aired on ABC from October that year until June 2009. The show was warmly reviewed during its run, with television critic John Leonard believing it to be "at once satire, mystery, fairy tale, romance, lollipop, whimsy, and kazoo", and singling out Friel as a highlight. Her portrayal of Charles, a resurrected murder victim and passionate beekeeper, won her a nomination for the 2008 Golden Globe Award for Best Actress in a Comedy Series. Daisies was cancelled shortly after its second season finale, with viewership having dropped from 13 million to 4.9 million. Friel was subsequently offered a number of roles on American television, but turned them down to focus on her film career.

For her portrayal of the title character in Bathory, a 2008 historical drama directed by Juraj Jakubisko, Friel was nominated for that year's Czech Lion Award for Best Actress. With a budget of UK£9.5 million, the film was the most expensive ever made in central Europe and broke box-office records in Slovakia. In her review for The Guardian, Gwladys Fouché described the film as being "bathed in a gothic atmosphere that tops every Dracula movie you've seen", while saying of Friel, "[she] spends two-and-half hours wielding swords, torturing peasants, surviving poison plots and making love to Caravaggio (yes, the Italian painter) to protect her land", adding that "[she] rolls her r's in an interesting attempt at a local accent". Her next project was the science fiction adventure film Land of the Lost—her first lead role in a major U.S. production—where she co-starred opposite Will Ferrell. Directed by Brad Silberling and based on the 1970s television series of the same name, Lost was met with tepid reviews and poor box office upon its release in June 2009, though some critics enjoyed Friel's portrayal of Holly Cantrell, a spirited palaeontologist, remarking that she and Ferrell shared onscreen chemistry.

Friel returned to the stage towards the end of 2009 in an adaptation of Truman Capote's Breakfast at Tiffany's, which ran for four months at the Theatre Royal Haymarket and gained notice for its addition of nudity, with heightened security being implemented at the venue after naked images of Friel were leaked online. The production received mixed reviews, but Friel's portrayal of café society daydreamer Holly Golightly (one of her "all time favourite heroines") was praised: Alice Jones of The Independent described her as "infectious", adding, "Gorgeously gamine and wrapped, like a treat from Tiffany's, in an array of ever more extravagantly bowed cocktail dresses, she's a bewitching stage presence, at once perilously provocative and child-like"; while Ray Bennett of The Hollywood Reporter believed she brought "confidence" and "considerable depth" to the part. In November 2009, Friel won an RTS Award for "Best Performance in a Drama Series" for her work as Dee, a struggling single mother who turns to prostitution, in BBC One's The Street.

=== 2010–2019: Marcella and other leading roles ===
Friel had key parts in three films released in 2010: self-destructive Iris in the Woody Allen ensemble comedy You Will Meet a Tall Dark Stranger, ex-drug addict Melissa in Neil Burger's lucrative sci-fi thriller Limitless, and depressed alcoholic Briony in the gangster drama London Boulevard, with her work in the latter being described as "engaging". She appeared the following year as a fictionalised version of herself in the mockumentary comedy series Come Fly with Me, as well as starring as a ruthless pirate in Neverland—a Syfy-produced prequel to J. M. Barrie's Peter Pan—and earning strong notices for her performance in the mystery-drama miniseries Without You.

In 2012, Friel starred as a vilified probation officer in the BBC crime drama series Public Enemies, with Metro calling her "sharp-suitedly intense". She then headlined two British films—The Look of Love, a biopic where she played the long-suffering wife of millionaire porn baron Paul Raymond, and the independent dramedy Having You (both 2013)—and returned to the West End in Anton Chekhov's Uncle Vanya at the Vaudeville Theatre (November 2012 to February 2013), receiving praise for her role as aristocratic newlywed Yelena. In September 2013, Friel was cast as one of the main characters in the Ridley Scott-directed pilot The Vatican, though—due in part to a negative response from affiliates of the Catholic Church—Showtime decided not to proceed with a full series. Her sole film credit of 2014 was the American action thriller Good People, in which Variety's Guy Lodge felt she was she "egregiously wasted in a throwaway best-friend role".

In the thriller series American Odyssey, Friel played the lead role of Sgt. Odelle Ballard, an American special ops soldier on a secret mission in Mali, West Africa. The NBC show ran for a single season between April and June 2015, with some critics comparing it unfavourably to Homeland, though Friel's performance was roundly praised. She starred that same year in the World War II-set Norwegian miniseries The Heavy Water War (known elsewhere as The Saboteurs) and in the British film Urban and the Shed Crew, a drama based on a 2005 memoir. Her next film projects were the independent dark comedy The Cleanse, revenge thriller I.T. (both 2016), and the Irish-Canadian crime drama Tomato Red (2017), where her role as a trailer trash mother drew attention for being against type.

Friel began playing the eponymous Marcella Backland in the British Nordic noir detective series, Marcella, in 2016. Speaking of her decision to take on the part—a former policewoman who returns to work to investigate an unsolved serial killer case—she told a journalist prior to the debut of the second season, "I nearly pulled out of [the job] after I'd accepted it [because] I just thought, 'Oh God, how can I do this? There are so many amazing female detectives that have done it so well, I don't know what I can offer differently' [...] so when [the first season] was received as well as it was, I thought maybe I had done something that is different and I've put my own ownership and my own stamp on it". In 2019, Friel collected the International Emmy Award for Best Actress for her portrayal of Backland, which Decider felt was "extraordinary":

Friel is a master of expressions. From scene to scene the actress' face can shift from chilling hard stares to wide-eyed looks of terror. It's never completely clear what Marcella is thinking or what she's going to do next. Not only does this allow Friel to explore her wide range, but it adds to the unsettling tone of this show.

Marcella's third and final season debuted on Netflix in 2020, with Friel commenting afterwards that a fourth season was unlikely to happen.

On the second season of The Girlfriend Experience (2017), an anthology drama series produced by Steven Soderbergh for the Starz network, Friel played Erica Myles, an ambitious financier engaged in dom-sub partnerships with multiple women. Her performance was described as "outstanding" by The Atlantic and "fantastic" by Variety, who added, "sometimes [the camera] just focuses on her eyes, which can either well up with frustrated tears or shutter in Erica's emotions, as changeable as the sky reflected in a lake". Referring to the series' intense work schedule and the explicit nature of its sex scenes, Friel said that the role was her "most challenging job to date". That same year, she was nominated for the British Academy Television Award for Best Supporting Actress for her portrayal of a destitute mother in the six-part BBC drama Broken, with Metro's Sarah Deen noting, "Friel excellently [plays] Christina's frantic desperation [...] all wild eyes, flapping shoes and dry humour ('I went to Mass and I got the sack. What am I gonna get tomorrow? Cystitis?'). You couldn't tell if her wit was genuine or hastily developed as a defence mechanism to stop her from bursting into tears".

Friel's next project was the ITV drama series Butterfly, in which she played Vicky, the parent of a transgender child. In their review of the show, which aired across three weeks in October 2018, the New Statesman felt that Friel's portrayal of a mother "racked by guilt" was "sterling". Friel said that she and the show's creators felt a great responsibility to make it as realistic as possible: "We met all these wonderful families, who were saying, 'please tell our story and tell it properly'". The following year, she headlined the six-part miniseries Deep Water, which Metro described as a "dark soap opera", adding, "The performances [elevate it] to a must-binge drama [...] Friel excels when it comes to playing harassed women, usually ones with a secret to keep, and the actress completely [disappears] into [her character]".

=== 2020–present: Film and television ===
In the 2020 horror film Books of Blood, Friel played Mary, a grieving mother who tries to make contact with her late son through a spiritual medium. Based on a collection of stories by Clive Barker, Blood received mixed reviews, though critics remarked that Friel's work was strong. Her next project was the starring role of Sharon Pici, a Kansas City detective, in Viaplay's seven-part psychological thriller series The Box (2021). The following year, she co-headlined the Fox musical drama series Monarch opposite Susan Sarandon. Friel played Nicolette "Nicky" Roman, a singer-songwriter trying to continue her family's legacy while forging her own path in the country music industry. In his review for The A.V. Club, Max Gao said:

Friel, not Sarandon, is the show's real leading lady—and a pretty great one at that [...] She belts out song after song, delivers memorable, fast-paced one-liners in a Texas accent ("I was going to say be careful about the rats, but there's no need because... you're going to fit right in"), and plays Nicky with such steadfast conviction that it's easy to wonder why she hasn't been more successful on this side of the pond since starring in ABC's Pushing Daisies [...] thankfully [this is] a role that is worthy of her talents.

Friel performed every song that her character sings—a mixture of covers and originals—herself. It was announced in December 2022 that the series had been cancelled after one season.

In the period drama film Charming the Hearts of Men (2021), Friel played Grace Gordon, a woman fighting for civil rights in 1960s Southern America. Her work drew acclaim, with Film Threat commenting that her "lived-in" performance was key to Hearts' success. She then appeared as Nicky, a Liverpudlian nurse helping one of her patients unravel a dark secret, in the Netflix feature Locked In (2023). The psychological thriller was poorly reviewed, though Benjamin Lee of The Guardian felt that Friel was "excellent" in an "underwritten role".

Friel's work in the one-off television drama Unforgivable was particularly well received, with The Guardian referring to her portrayal of Anna McKinney—a mother trying desperately to hold her family together after her son is sexually abused by her own brother—as "absolutely wonderful", and The Telegraph calling it "the best performance of her career". The project marked her third collaboration with writer Jimmy McGovern, about whom she said, "[His] work is so hard-hitting and real and true. I don't think any actor would ever say no to a Jimmy McGovern script".

== Other work ==
Friel has featured in print and television advertising campaigns for brands such as Reebok, Virgin Atlantic, Mulberry, Three, Pantene, and Marks & Spencer.

In 2010, she co-starred with Michael Sheen in the music video for the Manic Street Preachers' single "(It's Not War) Just the End of Love", in which their characters were absorbed in a game of chess.

Friel works as an ambassador for the WWF wildlife charity.

== Personal life ==
In the 1990s she was engaged to actor Darren Day. In 2001, Friel began a relationship with actor David Thewlis, after the pair met on a flight to Cannes. Later that year, Friel collapsed and was rushed to a hospital, needing emergency surgery and two blood transfusions for a ruptured ovarian cyst. It was discovered that she suffered from endometriosis and would have difficulty conceiving. Despite that, she became pregnant and gave birth to a daughter in 2005. In December 2010, after almost ten years together, Friel and Thewlis separated. Friel dated actor Rhys Ifans from 2011 to 2014.

On 18 September 2025, Phil Appleton, 71, was given a 15-year restraining order, after pleading guilty to stalking Friel over a period of almost three years, regularly turning up at her home and leaving unwanted gifts.

== Accolades ==
Year	Association	Category	Work	Result	Ref
1995	National Television Awards	Most Popular Actress	Brookside	Won	
1995	TV Times Awards	Best Actress	Brookside	Won	
1995	Smash Hits Poll Winners Party	Best TV Actress	Brookside	Won	
1999	Drama Desk Awards	Outstanding Featured Actress in a Play	Closer	Won	
2001	Genie Awards	Best Actress	The War Bride	Nominated	
2007	Satellite Awards	Best Actress – Television Series Musical or Comedy	Pushing Daisies	Nominated	
2008	Saturn Awards	Best Actress on Television	Pushing Daisies	Nominated	
2008	Scream Awards	Breakout Performance	Pushing Daisies	Nominated	
2008	Golden Globe Awards	Best Actress – Television Series Musical or Comedy	Pushing Daisies	Nominated	
2008	Online Film & Television Association	Best Actress in a Comedy Series	Pushing Daisies	Nominated	
2008	Poppy Awards	Best Actress in a Comedy Series	Pushing Daisies	Nominated	
2009	Scream Awards	Best Fantasy Actress	Pushing Daisies	Nominated	
2009	RTS North West Awards	Best Performance in a Single Drama or Drama Series	The Street	Won	
2009	Czech Lion Awards	Best Actress in Leading Role	Bathory	Nominated	
2010	Sun in a Net Awards	Best Actress in a Leading Role	Bathory	Won	
2010	SFX Awards	Best Actress	Pushing Daisies	Nominated	
2017	Festival Séries Mania	Best Actress	Broken	Won	
2017	International Emmy Awards	Best Performance by an Actress	Marcella	Won	
2017	National Television Awards	Drama Performance	Marcella	Longlisted	
2018	British Academy Television Awards	Best Supporting Actress	Broken	Nominated	
2019	Irish Post Awards	Outstanding Contribution to Film and TV		Won	
2019	RTS North West Awards	Best Performance in a Single Drama or Drama Series	Butterfly	Nominated	
2020	National Television Awards	Drama Performance	Deep Water	Longlisted	

== Filmography ==
=== Film ===
Year	Title	Role	Notes
1998	The Stringer	Helen	
1998	The Land Girls	Prue (Prudence)	
1999	A Midsummer Night's Dream	Hermia	
1999	Rogue Trader	Lisa Leeson	
1999	Mad Cows	Maddy	
2000	Sunset Strip	Tammy Franklin	
2000	An Everlasting Piece	Bronagh	
2001	The War Bride	Lily	
2001	Me Without You	Marina	
2003	Last Rumba in Rochdale	Bodney (voice)	Short
2003	Timeline	Lady Claire	
2005	Goal!	Roz Harmison	
2005	Niagara Motel	Denise	
2006	Irish Jam	Maureen Duffy	
2007	Goal II: Living the Dream	Roz Harmison	
2007	Rubbish	Isobel	Short
2008	Bathory	Countess Erzsébet Báthory	
2009	Land of the Lost	Holly Cantrell	
2010	London Boulevard	Briony Mitchel	
2010	You Will Meet a Tall Dark Stranger	Iris	
2011	Limitless	Melissa	
2012	Metamorphosis: Titian 2012	Diana	Short
2013	The Look of Love	Jean Raymond	
2013	Having You	Anna	
2014	Good People	Sarah	
2014	Advent	Helen	Short
2015	Urban & the Shed Crew	Greta	
2016	The Cleanse	Maggie	
2016	I.T.	Rose Regan	
2017	Tomato Red	Bev Merridew	
2018	The Sea	Jenny	Short
2019	Sulphur and White	Joanne Tait	
2020	Books of Blood	Mary	
2021	Charming the Hearts of Men	Grace Gordon	
2023	Locked In	Nurse Mackenzie	

=== Television ===
Key
†	Denotes television productions that have not yet been released

Year	Title	Role	Notes
1991	G.B.H.	Susan Nelson	Main cast
1991	Coronation Street	Belinda Johnson	2 episodes
1992	Emmerdale	Poppy Bruce	4 episodes
1993	Medics	Holly Jarrett	Episode #3.3
1993	In Suspicious Circumstances	Alice Rudrum	Episode #3.5
1993–1995	Brookside	Beth Jordache	Series regular
1995	The Imaginatively Titled Punt & Dennis Show	Unknown	Episode #2.1
1996	Tales from the Crypt	Angelica / Leah	Episode: "About Face"
1996	Cadfael	Sioned	Episode: "A Morbid Taste for Bones"
1998	Our Mutual Friend	Bella Wilfer	Main cast
1998	The Tribe	Lizzie	Television film
1998	St. Ives	Flora Gilchrist	Television film
2000	Lum the Invader Girl	Lum (voice)	Comedy dub of Urusei Yatsura for BBC Choice; 2 episodes
2001	The Fear	Storyteller	Episode: "Horror: A True Tale"
2002	Fields of Gold	Lucia Merritt	Television film
2003	Watermelon	Claire Ryan	Television film
2004	The Jury	Megan Delaney	Main cast
2004	Perfect Strangers	Susie Wilding	Television film
2007–2009	Pushing Daisies	Charlotte "Chuck" Charles	Main cast
2009	The Street	Dee Purnell	2 episodes
2011	Neverland	Elizabeth Bonny	Main cast
2011	Treasure Guards	Victoria Eckhart	Television film
2011	Come Fly with Me	Herself	Episode #1.5
2011	Without You	Ellie	Main cast
2012	Public Enemies	Paula Radnor	Main cast
2013	Playhouse Presents	Jenny	Episode: "The Pavement Psychologist"
2013	The Vatican	Kayla Duffy	Unaired pilot
2014	The Psychopath Next Door	Eve Wright	Television film
2015	American Odyssey	Sgt. Odelle Ballard	Main cast
2015	The Heavy Water War	Julie Smith	Main cast
2016–2019	Marcella	Det Sgt Marcella Backland	Main cast
2017	The Keith & Paddy Picture Show	Adrian	Episode: "Rocky"
2017	Broken	Christina Fitzsimmons	Main cast
2017	The Girlfriend Experience	Erica Myles	Main cast (season 2)
2018	Butterfly	Vicky Duffy	Main cast
2019	Deep Water	Lisa Kallisto	Main cast
2022	Monarch	Nicolette "Nicky" Roman	Main cast
2025	Unforgivable	Anna	Television film
2026	The F Ward	Dr Gloria Wall	TV series
TBA	The Dream Lands †	Jas	Main cast

=== Voice work ===
Year	Title	Role	Notes
2016	The Tale of Kitty-in-Boots and Other Stories	Narrator	Audiobook (author: Beatrix Potter)
2017	Alien: River of Pain	Anne Jorden	Audiobook (author: Christopher Golden)
2018	The Perfect Girlfriend	Narrator	Audiobook (author: Karen Hamilton)

=== Music videos ===
Year	Song	Artist	Notes
2010	"(It's Not War) Just the End of Love"	Manic Street Preachers	Directed by Alex Smith

== Theatre ==
Year	Film	Role	Notes
1997	Look, Europe!	Unknown	Almeida Theatre
1999	Closer	Alice	Music Box Theatre
2001	Lulu	Lulu	Almeida Theatre; Kennedy Center
2009	Breakfast at Tiffany's	Holly Golightly	Theatre Royal Haymarket
2012–2013	Uncle Vanya	Yelena	Vaudeville Theatre
