= Pushing Daisies =

American comedy-drama television series (2007–2009)

- Genre: Comedy drama; Fantasy; Mystery
- Created by: Bryan Fuller
- Starring: Lee Pace; Anna Friel; Chi McBride; Ellen Greene; Swoosie Kurtz; Kristin Chenoweth; Field Cate
- Narrated by: Jim Dale
- Composer: Jim Dooley
- Country of origin: United States
- Original language: English
- No. of seasons: 2
- No. of episodes: 22 (list of episodes)

Production
- Executive producers: Bryan Fuller; Barry Sonnenfeld; Dan Jinks; Bruce Cohen; Brooke Kennedy; Peter Ocko
- Running time: 42 minutes
- Production companies: The Jinks/Cohen Company; Living Dead Guy Productions; Warner Bros. Television

Original release
- Network: ABC
- Release: October 3, 2007 – June 13, 2009

Pushing Daisies is an American comedy drama television series created by Bryan Fuller that aired on ABC from October 3, 2007, to June 13, 2009. The series stars Lee Pace as Ned, a pie-maker with the ability to bring dead things back to life with his touch, an ability that comes with stipulations. Together with his formerly deceased childhood crush Chuck (Anna Friel), co-worker Olive Snook (Kristin Chenoweth), and private investigator Emerson Cod (Chi McBride), Ned uses his abilities to solve murder cases. The cast also includes Ellen Greene, Swoosie Kurtz and Field Cate, with Jim Dale acting as narrator.

Touted as a "forensic fairy tale", the series is known for its unusual visual style, eccentric production design, quirky characters, fast-paced dialogue and grotesque situations. The series often uses wordplay, metaphor and double entendre, while Jim Dale's narration is very similar to that of a fairy tale.

The series received critical acclaim, with praises going towards the cast, direction, writing, tone, and set design, and won numerous awards. The series received 17 Primetime Emmy Award nominations, with seven wins, including Outstanding Directing for a Comedy Series for Barry Sonnenfeld and Outstanding Supporting Actress in a Comedy Series for Kristin Chenoweth. TV Guide included the series in their 2013 list of 60 shows that were "Cancelled Too Soon". In 2015, Pushing Daisies was voted first in Esquire's "TV Reboot Tournament" that asked fans to vote for the show they would most like to see return to television.

== Plot ==
Pushing Daisies centers on the life of Ned, a pie-maker gifted with the ability to reanimate the dead by touching them. If something is revived for more than one minute, a similar "life value" in the vicinity drops dead as a form of balance. If he touches the revived person or thing a second time, they die permanently.

As a child, he brings back his mother when she dies of an aneurysm. This causes the death of the father of his neighbor and childhood sweetheart, Charlotte "Chuck" Charles. That night, Ned's mother falls dead permanently when she kisses him goodnight. Chuck's agoraphobic aunts, Vivian and Lily, move in to care for her and Ned is sent by his father to a boarding school, separating the children.

Ned becomes a pie-maker and opens a restaurant called The Pie Hole. He is aided by waitress Olive Snook, who pines for him. The restaurant is failing financially when private investigator Emerson Cod accidentally discovers Ned's powers and offers a proposal: Ned will temporarily bring murder victims back to life, allowing Emerson to inquire about the circumstances of their death, quickly solve the case, and split the reward money with him.

The scheme succeeds without issue until they learn that Chuck, whom Ned has not seen since childhood, was murdered. Ned revives her, but he cannot bring himself to let her die permanently. Ned and Chuck fall in love again, and although they can never touch each other, she moves into his home. Chuck joins Ned and Emerson in investigating deaths for reward money, beginning with her own murder.

Over the course of the series, Emerson searches for his missing daughter who was taken away by her mother, a con woman. After meeting a publisher of pop-up books, he is inspired to create and publish his own pop-up book, hoping that his daughter will read the book and find her way back to him. Chuck struggles to keep the secret of her revival from Vivian and Lily, and Vivian and Lily slowly accept the death of their niece. It is discovered that Chuck is Lily's daughter from an infidelity with Chuck's father while he was engaged to Vivian. Ned revives Chuck's father to ask him questions, and Chuck tricks Ned into thinking he touched her father a second time so that she can keep her father in her life. Chuck's father and Ned have an antagonistic relationship, and Chuck's father asks her to travel the world with him. When she tells him she would rather remain in town, he leaves alone.

The epilogue reveals that Emerson's daughter returns to him, Chuck is able to let her mother Lily and aunt Vivian know she is alive, and Olive has fallen in love with Randy Mann, a taxidermist friend of the group, and opens The Intrepid Cow, a restaurant dedicated to macaroni and cheese.

== Cast and characters ==
=== Main ===
- Lee Pace as Ned, also known as "The Piemaker", the owner of the Pie Hole restaurant who has the power to bring dead people back to life.
- Anna Friel as Charlotte "Chuck" Charles, Ned's childhood sweetheart, murdered, but brought back to life by Ned.
- Chi McBride as Emerson Cod, a private investigator and Ned's business partner.
- Jim Dale as the narrator of the series.
- Ellen Greene as Vivian Charles, Chuck's agoraphobic aunt.
- Swoosie Kurtz as Lily Charles and Vivian's sister and Chuck's agoraphobic birth mother, whom Chuck and Vivian thought (until the finale) was simply Chuck's other aunt.
- Kristin Chenoweth as Olive Snook, the Pie Hole waitress who is obsessed and hopelessly in love with Ned.
- Field Cate as Young Ned (season 2; recurring season 1), who appears in flashbacks.

=== Recurring ===
- Sy Richardson as the Coroner, the man in charge of the morgue where most of the murder victims' bodies are stored.
- Sammi Hanratty as Young Chuck, who appears in flashbacks.
- Stephen Root as Dwight Dixon, a mysterious man connected to both Ned's father and Chuck's father.
- David Arquette as Randy Mann, a taxidermist and client of the Pie Hole who is in love with Olive.
- Nicholas Khayyat as Eugene Mulchandani, Ned's childhood friend who appears in flashbacks.
- Diana Scarwid as Mother Superior, in charge of the monastery where Olive spends the first episodes of season two.
- Leyna Nguyen as a newscaster for Channel 9.
- Christine Adams as Simone Hundin, originally a murder suspect in season one, who becomes Emerson Cod's love interest.
- Jon Eric Price (season one) and George Hamilton (season two) as Ned's father
- Raúl Esparza as Alfredo Aldarisio, a traveling homeopathic antidepressant salesman.
- Josh Randall as Charles Charles, Chuck's father. The character was portrayed by several extras in season one.
- Paul Reubens as Oscar Vibenius, a murder suspect with an incredible sense of smell.
- Brad Grunberg as Lawrence and Louis Schatz, the man in charge of Chuck's funeral and his twin brother.
- Alex Miller and Graham Miller as Maurice and Ralston, Ned's twin half-brothers.
- Marc Raducci and Diana Costa as Olive's parents in flashbacks.

=== Guest ===
- Lee Arenberg as Arnaud Bailey ("Circus, Circus")
- Barbara Barrie as Mamma Jacobs ("Girth")
- Richard Benjamin as Jerry Holmes ("Window Dressed to Kill")
- Shelley Berman as Gustav Hoffer ("Robbing Hood")
- Matt Braunger as Rick ("Dummy")
- Danny Comden as Rob Wright ("Robbing Hood")
- Wilson Cruz as Sid Tango ("Kerplunk")
- Nora Dunn as Blanche Ramora ("Kerplunk")
- Patrick Fabian as Mark Chase ("Dummy")
- Willie Garson as Dick Dicker ("Window Dressed to Kill")
- Beth Grant as Marianne Marie Beetle ("Comfort Food")
- George Hamilton as Ned's Father ("The Norwegians", uncredited)
- Rachael Harris as Georgeann Heaps ("Circus, Circus")
- Michael Hitchcock as Father Eduardo Dedonde ("Bad Habits")
- Josh Hopkins as Shane Trickle ("Kerplunk")
- Orlando Jones as Magnus Olsdatter ("The Norwegians")
- David Koechner as Merle McQuoddy ("The Legend of Merle McQuoddy")
- Riki Lindhome as Jeanine ("Dummy")
- Hamish Linklater as John Joseph Jacobs ("Girth")
- Jessica Lundy as Hillary Hundin ("Bitches")
- Wendie Malick as Coral Ramora ("Kerplunk")
- Jayma Mays as Elsa/Elsita ("Pigeon")
- Joel McHale as Harold Hundin ("Bitches")
- Ivana Miličević as Hedda Lillihammer ("The Norwegians")
- Debra Mooney as Calista Cod ("Frescorts")
- Sam Pancake as Denny Downs ("Window Dressed to Kill")
- Ethan Phillips as Daniel Hill ("Robbing Hood")
- Robert Picardo as Detective Puget ("Water & Power")
- Mary Kay Place as Annabelle Vandersloop ("The Legend of Merle McQuoddy")
- Missi Pyle as Betty Bee ("Bzzzzzzzzz!")
- George Segal as Roy 'Buster' Bustamante ("Window Dressed to Kill")
- Molly Shannon as Dilly Balsam ("Bitter Sweets")
- Grant Shaud as Steve Kaiser ("Corpsicle")
- Christopher Sieber as Napoleon LeNez ("Smell of Success")
- Joey Slotnick as Jimmy Neptune ("Kerplunk")
- French Stewart as Woolsey Nicholls ("Bzzzzzzzzz!")
- Eric Stonestreet as Leo Burns ("Comfort Food")
- Paul F. Tompkins as Gunther Pinker in ("Oh Oh Oh... It's Magic")
- Gina Torres as Lila Robinson ("Water and Power")
- Jenny Wade as Halley Hundin ("Bitches")
- Mike White as Billy Balsam ("Bitter Sweets")
- Fred Willard as The Great Herrmann ("Oh Oh Oh...It's Magic")
- Ping Wu as Bao Ting ("Dim Sum Lose Some")
- Ron Yuan as Shrimpboy ("Dim Sum Lose Some")
- Constance Zimmer as Coco Juniper ("Window Dressed to Kill")

== Production ==
=== Development ===
The series was greenlit and given a 13-episode order by ABC on May 11, 2007. On October 23, 2007, the show received a full season order. However, scripts for nine episodes were completed before the start of the 2007–2008 Writers Guild of America strike. Bryan Fuller reportedly made last-minute changes to the ninth episode to allow it to serve as a season finale, adjusting the episode to be a cliffhanger.

Because of the Writers Guild strike, the show completed just nine episodes of a 22-episode season. Instead of attempting to complete the first season, the writers planned to begin work on the second season with production resuming around March to June 2008. Although ABC picked Pushing Daisies up for the 2008–09 television season, when ratings quickly declined ABC opted not to order additional episodes beyond the second season's initial thirteen. By November 20, 2008, creator Bryan Fuller had confirmed that Pushing Daisies had been cancelled by ABC and expressed the possibility of wrapping up lingering plotlines in a comic book or movie sequel.

The last scheduled episode was broadcast in the United States on December 17, 2008, leaving three episodes unaired, although those episodes were screened at the 2009 Paley Fest. ABC was negotiating at one time to forfeit broadcast rights to the shows and make the unaired episodes available exclusively online, but announced on April 3, 2009 the final three episodes would be broadcast on ABC Saturdays at 10:00 pm beginning May 30. According to Chenoweth, these episodes do not provide a narrative conclusion to the series.

The final three episodes aired on ABC on successive Saturdays at 10:00 pm from Saturday, May 30, 2009 to June 13, 2009, having aired elsewhere around the world. In India, the last episode aired on February 27, 2009 as a world premiere. In Germany, the television network ProSieben showed the last three episodes of Pushing Daisies on March 4, 2009 ("Window Dressed to Kill") and March 11, 2009 ("Water and Power", "Kerplunk"). The final three episodes were also broadcast on ITV1 in the UK before their US debut.

The original concept of Pushing Daisies was rooted from Dead Like Me. The show's creator, Bryan Fuller, intended for Pushing Daisies to be a spinoff of Dead Like Me.

=== Visual design ===
Production designer Michael Wylie told TV Guide that "My goal was a storybook come to life. I wanted everything to look almost like an illustration." He achieved this by "concentrating on conflicting patterns in different colors, particularly reds and oranges, but per director Barry Sonnenfeld, virtually no blues." Cinematographer Michael Weaver told Variety that he and the producers decided the visuals should "feel somewhere between Amélie and a Tim Burton film — something big, bright and bigger than life."

Screenshot from "Bzzzzzzzzz!" showcasing its visual style—the use of colors, symmetry, and shapes.

The distinctive storybook-esque style is continued within the overall design of the visual aspects. Circular background shapes, circular windows, and framing shots within circles was a theme seen consistently throughout the series. Symmetry is a common theme used in the visual style, and characters are often framed in windows, doors, or background props. A heavy use of patterns within a location was often used, where a similar pattern would be used in almost the entire location—the wallpaper, window blinds, bedsheets, pillows, furniture, and even clothing, such as Olive's apartment. The series would often use top-down perspectives and over-head shots would showcase its overall visual style. Regardless of the fact that the show focuses on murder investigations, the morgue is painted in candy-cane stripes and many outfits worn by the characters are vibrantly colored, bright, and cheery (for example, Olive's work uniforms alternate between bright orange and lime-green pinstriped dresses, and Emerson is often seen wearing shades of purple). Only Ned consistently wears black.

CGI is prominent in the series, with much use of blue screen technology (the shop window, similar set pieces and outdoor scenery outside often cast a blue halo tinge) and 3D set-extensions (streets, grass and landscape, the pie shop façade). The use of matte painting backdrops are used to complete the look.

Automobiles are often mint-condition vintage vehicles, though some newer vehicles were used (such as a mid-1990s Chevrolet Lumina APV minivan, a Hummer, or a 2006 Toyota Prius). Emerson drives a mid-1960s Lincoln Continental with suicide doors in new condition. Ned is seen driving an old, like-new Mercedes-Benz W108. Other characters drive decades-old vehicles as well. 1959 Cadillac Miller-Meteor cars in ambulance and hearse configurations figure frequently. Old-fashioned trolley cars can be seen in several shots panning in to the Pie Hole.

=== Quirkiness ===
Critics noted the Pushing Daisies distinctive visual style. A NYTimes critic describes it as a "candy-colored, computer-generated bucolic scenery" and another describes a "Technicolor world that seems to exist at right angles to our own" and note "bizarre dialogue" and the use of alliterative and near-duplicate names of both characters (such as Deedee Duffield, Billy Balsam, the Darling Mermaid Darlings, Charles Charles, Charlotte "Chuck" Charles, John Joseph Jacobs, etc.) and locations (Boutique Travel Travel Boutique, Über Life Life Insurance, Coeur d'Coeurs, etc.). Some narration is done in the poetic style of Dr. Seuss.

=== Music ===
The show contains original music composed and arranged by Jim Dooley. The first six minutes of the series pilot, "Pie-lette", were composed by Blake Neely. Dooley describes the musical score as having an Amélie type of sound (Yann Tiersen), which is a "wide-angled, adult fairy tale, with a narrator and this super-real world". It was announced on Jim Dooley's website that the soundtrack of the first season was originally to be released by Varèse Sarabande on October 21, 2008, but was delayed until December 23, 2008, with the album available in the iTunes Store on December 10, 2008. A soundtrack for the second season was released on April 5, 2011, also composed by Jim Dooley and released by Varèse Sarabande.

Both Kristin Chenoweth and Ellen Greene have backgrounds in musical theater, and have performed musical numbers in some episodes. In "Dummy", Chenoweth sings "Hopelessly Devoted to You" from the movie musical Grease. In "Pigeon", Chenoweth and Greene harmonize on the They Might Be Giants hit "Birdhouse in Your Soul". Also, in "Smell of Success", Greene sings "Morning Has Broken". Chenoweth asked to sing "Eternal Flame" in an episode, which Bryan Fuller agreed to accommodate. The song is sung in "Comfort Food". She performs a cover of Lionel Richie's "Hello" in "Window Dressed to Kill".

== Series continuation ==
=== Comics ===
The show's official website included a comic book that was distributed at the 2007 San Diego Comic-Con, with new mysteries and background information not seen on the televised episodes. The book also contained recaps of aired episodes.

When the show struggled in the ratings during its second season, Bryan Fuller said that, should ABC not pick up additional episodes, he would release comic books and maybe a movie based on the show to wrap up outstanding stories for fans. Warner Bros. gave Fuller permission to produce comic books of the series.

Fuller stated that the "third season" comic book series would be twelve issues long, with a fresh take on the zombie genre starring all of the characters from the show. It was to have been published by DC Comics' WildStorm imprint. On October 13, 2009, Entertainment Weekly reported that Bryan Fuller had turned in the script for the first comic issue, featuring recurring character Oscar Vibenius, and continued to work with the show's writers on the next three comic scripts. In January 2010, a rumor leaked that the comic series could potentially become a graphic novel instead.

On September 23, 2010, Entertainment Weekly reported the first issue of "season 3" was expected in early 2011. Further, Fuller stated that he and the show's composer Jim Dooley had talked about giving the audience a multimedia experience with a Pushing Daisies comic soundtrack, to be released officially or streamed for free online when the comic book was published. Fuller stated that Dooley had started composing musical cues, and that the cast had agreed to sing on the soundtrack, though licensing fees for the actors may have prevented such performances from being included.

In late 2010, DC Comics shut down its WildStorm imprint. On April 23, 2011, Fuller confirmed that release of the comic had been postponed by the loss of its publisher. At the same time, Fuller released the first page of the uncolored version of the comic book.

=== Mini-series/film ===
On April 1, 2011, at WonderCon in San Francisco, Bryan Fuller was quoted as saying "I am really emboldened by what Starz is doing with Torchwood and I would love to do a Pushing Daisies mini-series on Starz", Fuller said. "This would be a great way to wrap up the show properly. [We could] do six great episodes or even a Pushing Daisies movie. But I kind of like the idea of a Starz mini-series since they really embraced Torchwood."

After his success on Kickstarter for raising money for a Veronica Mars movie in March 2013, Veronica Mars creator Rob Thomas said that Bryan Fuller approached him to "talk to [me] about how this thing works" in relation to continuing Pushing Daisies. Fuller later commented that a Kickstarter campaign would be harder for Pushing Daisies due to the budget differences. He said that $12–15 million would be required.

In the wake of Roseanne Barr's dismissal from the ABC Network in May 2018, Fuller pitched a Pushing Daisies revival on Twitter to take the spot left by the now-canceled Roseanne on its schedule.

=== Broadway musical ===
On July 16, 2012, when asked about a potential stage adaptation of the show by TVLine's Michael Ausiello, Fuller responded "Perhaps!" and continued with "I can't really say until it's confirmed, but perhaps. We're working on something that is definitely a 'Pushing Daisies' revival, and the idea would be to have as many cast [members] as we can to participate in it." In February 2014, Fuller revealed he had discussions with Warner Bros. studios and director Barry Sonnenfeld about reviving the series as either a film or a Broadway musical starring Kristin Chenoweth.

== Reception ==
=== Critical response ===
Both seasons of Pushing Daisies received critical acclaim. On the review aggregation website Rotten Tomatoes, the overall series holds a 96% rating. The first season received a rating of 92% based on 25 reviews with an average rating of 8.4 out of 10. The site's critical consensus reads, "A gloriously strange fairy tale, Pushing Daisies' oddball charms are brought to life with warmth and whimsy in large part thanks to the chemistry of its charismatic leads." Meanwhile, the second season received a rating of 100% based on 21 reviews with an average rating of 7.9 out of 10. The site's critical consensus reads, "Pushing Daisies' tawdry quirks continue to bloom in a deliciously inventive second season that rises to the high bar set by its predecessor." On Metacritic, which uses a weighted average, the overall series received a score of 85 out of 100. The first season garnered a score of 86 out of 100, based on 30 reviews, indicating "universal acclaim". Meanwhile, the second season garnered a score of 83 out of 100, based on 14 reviews, also indicating "universal acclaim".

Critics responded well to the series, comparing the style and direction to that of director Tim Burton. The pilot, before it officially aired, was well received by critics who were able to screen it. TV Guide's Michael Ausiello claimed that "ABC has found its next Lost!" upon review and the series has been touted as "the fall show with the most spring buzz" by many, including the trade publication Variety. New York Magazine also provided a rave review, calling it "funny, imaginative and smart" while claiming it "boasts Gilmore Girls-speed wit." Television Without Pity declared it "one of the most original, most genuinely entertaining shows on TV. It's filled with tongue-tying turns of phrase, fabulous set design and a fantastic cast." Time magazine's James Poniewozik named it one of the Top 10 New TV Series of 2007, ranking it at #5. In 2024, IGN ranked it #93 on its list of the 100 best TV shows of all-time.

=== Awards and nominations ===
The show was nominated for 57 awards, and won 18 of them, including 7 Primetime Emmy Awards.

In 2008, the series received 12 Primetime Emmy Award nominations, including 2 wins. Barry Sonnenfeld won for Outstanding Directing for a Comedy Series for "Pie-lette". James Dooley won for Outstanding Music Composition for a Series for "Pigeon". Other notable nominations included Lee Pace for Outstanding Lead Actor in a Comedy Series, Kristin Chenoweth for Outstanding Supporting Actress in a Comedy Series, and Bryan Fuller for Outstanding Writing for a Comedy Series for "Pie-lette". The series also received 3 Golden Globe Award nominations for Best Television Series – Musical or Comedy, Best Actor in a Television Series – Musical or Comedy (Lee Pace), and Best Actress in a Television Series – Musical or Comedy (Anna Friel). Barry Sonnenfeld also won the Directors Guild of America Award for Outstanding Directing – Comedy Series for "Pie-lette".

In 2009, the series received 5 Primetime Emmy Award nominations, including 4 wins. Kristin Chenoweth won for Outstanding Supporting Actress in a Comedy Series while the series won 3 Creative Arts Emmy Awards.

=== U.S. ratings ===
The heavily promoted pilot episode ("Pie-lette") attracted 13 million viewers in the United States. It was the most-watched new series and 14th in overall viewership for the week.

Season	Episodes	Timeslot (ET)	Season premiere	Season finale	TV season	Season rank	Viewers (in millions)	Network
1	9	Wednesday 8:00 pm	October 3, 2007	December 12, 2007	2007–2008	#52	9.46	ABC
2	13	Wednesday 8:00 pm (October 1, 2008 – December 17, 2008); Saturday 10:00 pm (May 30, 2009 – June 13, 2009)	October 1, 2008	June 13, 2009	2008–2009	#95	6.10	ABC

== Home media ==
Season	Region 1 Release Date	Region 2 Release Date	Region 4 Release Date	Episodes	Discs	Bonus Features
1	September 16, 2008	June 23, 2008; September 15, 2008 (Blu-ray)	December 9, 2008	9	3	Pie Time: Time for Pie – An interactive featurette with creators of the show, the set designer and special effects team who all come together to make this show so unique. Special interviews from creator Bryan Fuller and Lee Pace as they discuss their favorite first season scenes. Region 4 DVDs do not contain this special feature.
2	July 21, 2009	May 25, 2009	April 28, 2010	13	4	The Master Pie Maker – Hop into creator Bryan Fuller's mind to discover the inner secrets of Pushing Daisies!; From Oven to Table – Follow the production challenges of taking one of Bryan Fuller's script ideas, involving a lighthouse and an egg, and crafting it into reality.; Secret Sweet Ingredients – Learn how composer Jim Dooley's music shapes a scene in ways most viewers aren't even aware of.; Add a Little Magic – Watch the visual effects team bring a 2-ton rhino to life and learn about the challenges of executing a scene to rival Jumanji!

== Syndication ==
Pushing Daisies premiered in syndication on Chiller on March 5, 2013. In 2015, Pushing Daisies was added to The CW's streaming service CW Seed. The CW is partly owned by Warner Bros. who owns the distribution rights. Pushing Daisies became available to stream on HBO Max in January 2021.
