= Leyna Nguyen =

Vietnamese-American podcaster and former television anchor and reporter

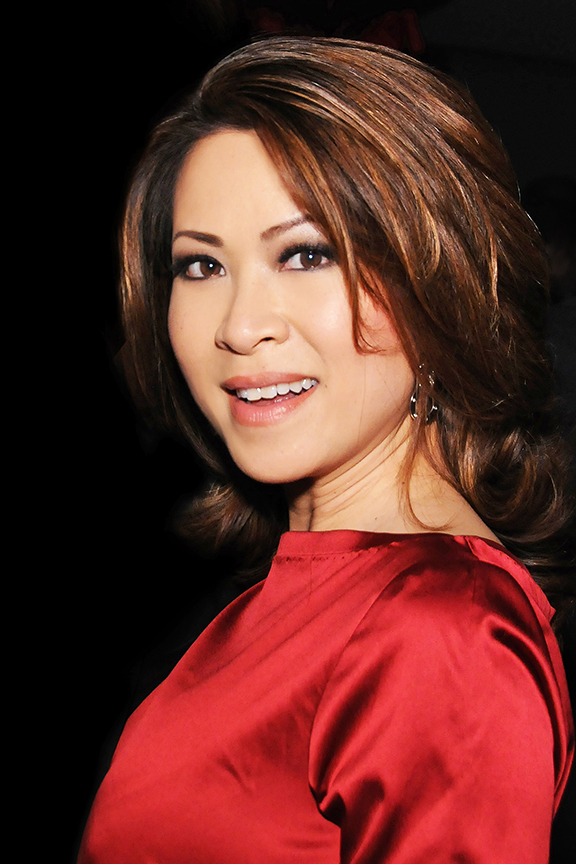
- Nguyen in 2014
- Born: December 13, 1969 (age 56); Dong Ha, Quảng Trị, South Vietnam
- Education: Webster University
- Occupations: News anchor, Podcaster
- Employers: WRDW-TV; KCRA; KCBS-TV/KCAL-TV (1997–2018)
- Awards: Emmy Award (3 Time Winner)

Leyna Nguyen (born December 13, 1969) is a Vietnamese-American podcaster and former television anchor and reporter in Los Angeles, California.

== Life and career ==
Nguyen is a three-time Emmy Award-winning journalist, who anchored the nightly 4pm and 9pm newscasts on KCAL-TV in Los Angeles. She made broadcast history by becoming the first newscaster to anchor the news on two stations in the same market, with the Viacom-owned duopoly of KCBS and KCAL-TV.

Her career in Los Angeles on CBS2 and KCAL9 spanned over two decades, from 1997 to 2018.

Before joining the second-largest television market in the nation, Nguyen was a news anchor and reporter for NBC-affiliate KCRA-TV in Sacramento, California, where she also hosted a quarterly program on Asian-American issues. Before California, Leyna was in Augusta, Georgia anchoring the news on CBS-affiliate WRDW-TV.

She appeared in over 30 television shows and movies such as NCIS: Los Angeles, Boston Legal, Two and a Half Men, Pushing Daisies, Austin Powers in Goldmember, The Day After Tomorrow, and Teenage Mutant Ninja Turtles. She hosted the annual Jerry Lewis Labor Day Telethon with entertainer Casey Kasem, and the Southern California Special Olympics Summer games, with Hall of Famer James Worthy. She's also involved in the Vietnamese entertainment industry, including a role as a master of ceremony for Asia Entertainment Inc. (from Asia 43 in 2004 through Asia 82 in 2018), and plays herself in numerous films and TV shows.

Nguyen was born in Vietnam and came to the United States in 1975, settling in Minnesota. She earned a degree in Mass Communications from Webster University in St. Louis. While in St. Louis, Leyna was the "Morning Drive" personality for jazz radio station WEBU, and was a substitute teacher for grades K through 6.

In 1987, Nguyen was crowned "Miss Asia," in 1996, she was named "YWCA Woman of The Year” in 2000, she was designated one of the country's "25 Most Influential Vietnamese-Americans in 25 years," and in 2011, she was honored by the California State Legislature as Woman of The Year for her philanthropic work.

Since 2020, Nguyen has produced and hosted a podcast about non-monogamy, swinging, cuckolding, and other alternative sexual lifestyles called Consenting Adults.

Nguyen has a non-profit foundation called "Love Across the Ocean", which benefits underprivileged school children in Vietnam and assists refugees in Southern California.
