= Field Cate =

American actor and musician

- Cate at the 12th Annual Satellite Awards in 2007
- Born: Field Adrianus Cate; July 22, 1997 (age 29); Burlington, Vermont, U.S.
- Occupations: Actor; musician
- Years active: 2003–present

Field Adrianus Cate (born July 22, 1997) is an American former child actor and musician. He is best known for his main role portraying young Ned in the fantasy comedy-drama Pushing Daisies (2007–2009). He is currently lead singer and guitarist of American rock trio Fencer.

== Career ==
Cate turned professional at the age of five, doing improvisational comedy, independent films, commercials, and other work. He also appears in Placebo's music video of "Song to Say Goodbye" credited as Field Cate.

He worked in guest roles on various television series including Without a Trace and Cold Case. His most notable role was as Young Ned on ABC's Pushing Daisies becoming a regular cast member in season 2 and earning a Young Artist Award nomination in 2008.

Raised a vegetarian, Cate spoke out on behalf of animal rights group PETA. He also supported groups such as Mattel Children's Hospital and served as a StarPower Ambassador for Starlight Children's Foundation.

In May 2017, his band Fencer released their first EP, With; and in February 2019, they released a music video for their single "Junebug." Their second EP, Growing Up Selfish, was released on November 1, 2019. Their debut album, Fencer, was released on February 3, 2023. The album was self produced.

== Filmography ==
Year	Title	Role	Notes
2006	Chloe's Prayer	Owen	
2007	Forever	Young boy	
2008	Struck	Teasing child	
2009	Space Buddies	Buddha (voice)	
2009	Mystical Chairs	Son	Short film
2009	Santa Buddies	Buddha (voice)	

=== Television ===
Year	Title	Role	Notes
2004	Passions	Ethan Winthrop Jr.	1 episode
2006	Untold Stories of the E.R.	Kevin Welch	1 Episode
2006	Without a Trace	Petros Marku	Episode: "The Damage Done"
2007	Seven's Eleven	Sonny	Episode: "Sweet Toys"
2007–2009	Pushing Daisies	Young Ned	Main role
2008	Cold Case	Young John Smith	Episode: "The Road"
2010	The Young and the Restless	Eric Sharpe	Recurring role
2010	The Bold and the Beautiful	Eric Sharpe	Recurring role
