= Chi McBride =

American actor (born 1961)

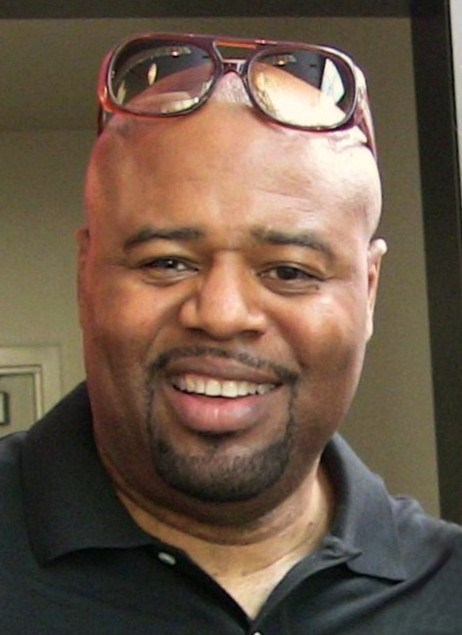
- McBride in 2009
- Born: Kenneth McBride; September 23, 1961 (age 65); Chicago, Illinois, U.S.
- Occupation: Actor
- Years active: 1992–present
- Spouse: Julissa Marquez

Kenneth "Chi" McBride (/ʃaɪ/ SHY; born September 23, 1961) is an American actor. He has appeared in films, where he is known primarily as a character actor, and in television, where he has had numerous starring roles.

In film, he has played prominent roles including The Frighteners (1996), Gone in 60 Seconds (2000), The Terminal (2004), I, Robot (2004), Waiting... (2005), Let's Go to Prison (2006), and Draft Day (2014).

On television, he was high school principal Steven Harper on the series Boston Public, Emerson Cod on Pushing Daisies, Detective Laverne Winston on the Fox drama Human Target, Detective Don Owen on the short-lived CBS crime drama Golden Boy, and Captain Lou Grover on Hawaii Five-0.

== Early life ==
McBride was born in Chicago, Illinois, from which his stage name derives. He was raised in the Seventh-day Adventist Church and attended Shiloh Academy, now known as Chicago SDA Academy, a Seventh-day Adventist school. McBride originally planned to pursue a career in music. After studying several instruments and singing with gospel choirs in his native Chicago, he relocated to Atlanta, Georgia, in 1986 to work for AT&T as a billing clerk.

== Career ==
McBride's first success in show business came with the hit song "Basically, He's the Champ" as part of the group KSL, which parodied the marriage of boxer Mike Tyson and actress Robin Givens. Based on the song's success, McBride was signed by Esquire Records, and he joined the rhythm and blues band Covert. Convinced he should try his hand in front of the camera, McBride moved to Los Angeles and, billed as "Chi", landed guest spots on Fox's In Living Color and NBC's The Fresh Prince of Bel-Air, as well as a featured role in the television film Revenge of the Nerds III: The Next Generation.

In 1998, he was a co-star of Mercury Rising, alongside Bruce Willis. He was later given the role of Principal Steven Harper on the series Boston Public. Much of McBride's work sees him playing right-hand man to the hero, as in the films Mercury Rising and The Terminal. He is also notable for television roles on The John Larroquette Show, House, The Secret Diary of Desmond Pfeiffer, Killer Instinct, and Pushing Daisies.

McBride's other film credits include Cradle 2 the Grave, The Distinguished Gentleman, Gone in 60 Seconds, The Frighteners, Narc, Disney's The Kid, I, Robot, Roll Bounce, Annapolis, Hoodlum, Undercover Brother, Let's Go to Prison, and The Brothers Solomon. McBride portrayed eight different characters in the play Nagataki Sake, directed by Robert Downey, Sr.

He starred in Human Target as Winston, business partner of Christopher Chance (the protagonist). The show premiered on January 17, 2010, on FOX.

Starting in 2013, he starred on Hawaii Five-0 as Captain Lou Grover. He previously worked with co-star Scott Caan in Gone in 60 Seconds.

In May 2021, Chi McBride has signed with Verve.

On May 14, 2021, CBS announced that McBride would star along with Pete Holmes and Katie Lowes in a sitcom based around the life of laid-off auto worker-turned-professional bowler Tom Smallwood. McBride plays Archie, a bowling alley owner who serves as friend and mentor to the main character played by Holmes. The multi-camera series debuted on March 31, 2022.

== Filmography ==
=== Film ===
Year	Title	Role	Notes
1992	The Distinguished Gentleman	Homer	
1993	What's Love Got to Do with It	Fross	
1996	The Great White Hype	Rowdy Spectator	
1996	The Frighteners	Cyrus	
1997	Hoodlum	Illinois Gordon	
1998	Mercury Rising	FBI Agent Thomas "Bizzi" Jordan	
2000	Dancing in September	Security Guard	
2000	Gone in 60 Seconds	Donny Astricky	
2000	Disney's The Kid	Kenny	
2000	Magicians	Tom	
2002	Narc	Captain Cheevers	
2002	Undercover Brother	The Chief	
2002	Paid in Full	Pip	
2003	Cradle 2 the Grave	Jump Chambers	
2003	Delusion	John	Short
2004	The Terminal	Joe Mulroy	
2004	I, Robot	Lt. John Bergin	
2005	Roll Bounce	Curtis Smith	
2005	Waiting...	Bishop Coleman	
2006	Annapolis	McNally	
2006	Ultimate Avengers 2	Chief Elder	Voice, direct-to-video
2006	Let's Go to Prison	Barry	
2007	The Brothers Solomon	James Coolwell	
2008	American Son	Eddie	
2008	First Sunday	Pastor Arthur Mitchell	
2008	Who Do You Love	Willie Dixon	
2009	Still Waiting...	Bishop Coleman	
2011	The Family Tree	Simon Krebs	
2011	Fruit of Labor	Mr. Hoffman	Short
2013	Pawn Shop Chronicles	Johnson	
2013	Lego Marvel Super Heroes: Maximum Overload	Nick Fury, Red Skull	Voice, short
2014	Draft Day	Walt Gordon	
2015	Home Sweet Hell	Chief Malcom Brown	
2017	Unspoken: Diary of an Assassin	Actor	
2022	Beavis and Butt-Head Do the Universe	Metcalf, Judge	Voice

=== Television ===
Year	Title	Role	Notes
1992	The Fresh Prince of Bel-Air	Ed Barker	Episode: "Boyz in the Woods"
1992	Revenge of the Nerds III: The Next Generation	Malcolm Pennington III	Television film
1993–96	The John Larroquette Show	Heavy Gene	Main cast
1994	Married... with Children	Dexter	Episode: "Nooner or Later"
1994	Cosmic Slop	T-Bone	Episode: "Tang"
1996	Nash Bridges	Luscious	Episode: "The Great Escape"
1998	The Secret Diary of Desmond Pfeiffer	Desmond Pfeiffer	Main cast
1999	The Parkers	Cliff Rogers	Episode: "Betting on Love"
2000	Sliders	Mule Packer	Episode: "Dust"
2000	God, the Devil and Bob	Mike	Voice, recurring cast
2000	King of the World	Drew Bundini Brown	Television film
2001	The Practice	Steven Harper	Episode: "The Day After"
2001	Rocket Power	Big Tony	Voice, episode: "Hurricane Maurice/Reggie's Choice"
2000–02	Max Steel	Jefferson Smith	Voice, main cast
2000–04	Boston Public	Steven Harper	Main cast
2005	Boston Legal	Steven Harper	Episode: "Let Sales Ring"
2005	House	Edward Vogler	Recurring cast (season 1)
2005–06	Killer Instinct	Lt. Matt Cavanaugh	Main cast
2006	Monk	Mayor Ray Nicholson	Episode: "Mr. Monk and the Garbage Strike"
2006–07	The Nine	Malcolm Jones	Main cast
2007–09	Pushing Daisies	Emerson Cod	Main cast
2010	Psych	Craig Snowden	Episode: "Ferry Tale"
2010–11	Human Target	Detective Laverne Winston	Main cast
2011	How I Met Your Mother	Rod	Episode: "Challenge Accepted"
2011	HawthoRNe	Garland Brice	Recurring cast (season 3)
2011	Suits	District Attorney Terrence Wolf	2 episodes
2012–13	Fury Files	Nick Fury	Voice, main cast
2012–15	Avengers Assemble	Nick Fury	Voice, recurring cast
2012–17	Ultimate Spider-Man	Nick Fury, Thunderball, additional voices	Voice, recurring cast
2013	Golden Boy	Detective Don Owen	Main cast
2013	Murder Police	Randall Hickox	Voice, main cast
2013	Phineas and Ferb	Nick Fury	Voice, episode: "Phineas and Ferb: Mission Marvel"
2013–20	Hawaii Five-0	Captain Lou Grover	Recurring cast (season 4), main cast (season 4-10)
2014–15	Hulk and the Agents of S.M.A.S.H.	Nick Fury	Voice, recurring cast
2015	Suits	District Attorney Terrence Wolf	Episode: "Intent"
2020	Puppy Dog Pals	Pops/Mr. Kimble	Voice, recurring cast (season 3)
2021	This Is Us	Paul DuBois	Episode: "Birth Mother"
2022	How We Roll	Archie Betts	Main cast
2022	Slippin' Jimmy	Father Karras	Voice, recurring cast
2026	Law & Order: Special Victims Unit	Thomas Ahern	Episode: Fidelis Ad Mortem
2026	I Will Find You	Max Williams	Main Cast
