= James Dooley (composer) =

American film score composer

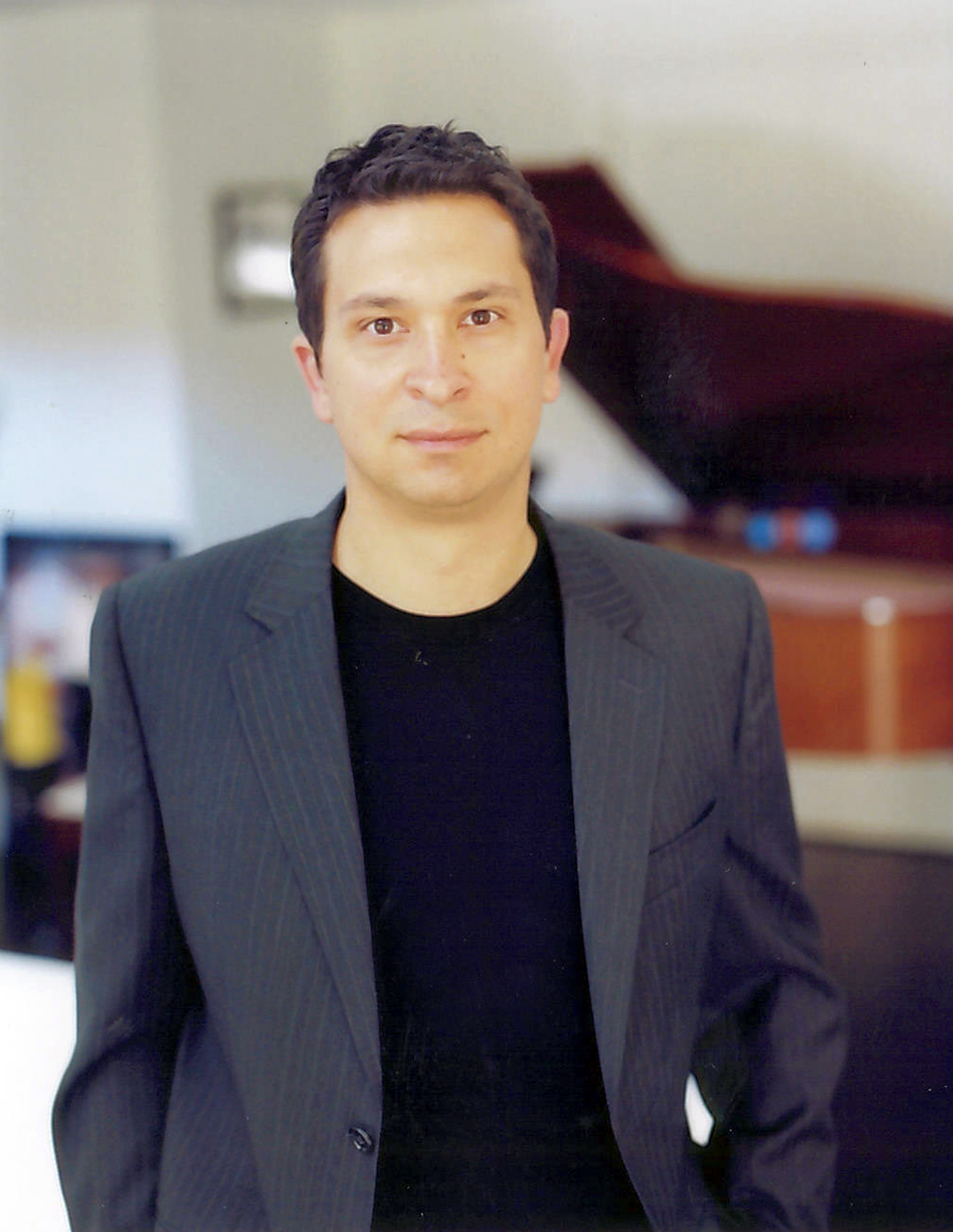

Background information
- Also known as: Jim Dooley
- Born: James Michael Dooley; August 22, 1976 (age 49); New York City, U.S.
- Occupation: Composer
- Website: jimdooley.com

James Michael Dooley (born August 22, 1976) is an American film score composer.

== Biography ==
Dooley was born in New York City and studied music at New York University, majoring in music composition. After finishing the university he moved to Los Angeles, where he studied music with prolific film score composers Christopher Young, Elmer Bernstein and Leonard Rosenman. In 1999, Dooley started working for Hans Zimmer as his chief technical assistant. He works in Santa Monica in Zimmer's film music studio Remote Control Productions (formerly Media Ventures). He composed, arranged, and orchestrated music for films like Spirit: Stallion of the Cimarron and The Da Vinci Code. He also composed music for inFAMOUS 2, Spider-Man: Shattered Dimensions and the Epic Mickey series and has collaborated with Celldweller and Tarja Turunen. He released his debut album, Veiled Nation, in 2013.

== Work ==
=== Film ===
| Year | Title | Director(s) | Notes |
|---|---|---|---|
| 1999 | The Good Man's Sin | Peter Sullivan | Short film |
| 2000 | Bit Players | Andy Berman | Short film, |
| 2000 | Gladiator | Ridley Scott | Assistant to Hans Zimmer |
| 2000 | Mission: Impossible II | John Woo | Assistant to Hans Zimmer |
| 2000 | An Everlasting Piece | Barry Levinson | Assistant to Hans Zimmer |
| 2001 | Pearl Harbor | Michael Bay | Assistant to Hans Zimmer |
| 2001 | Riding in Cars with Boys | Penny Marshall | Assistant to Hans Zimmer |
| 2001 | Hannibal | Ridley Scott | Additional music, with Hans Zimmer |
| 2001 | Black Hawk Down | Ridley Scott | Additional music, with Hans Zimmer |
| 2001 | The Clayfather | Ryan Nellis & Jose Solis | |
| 2002 | Untitled: 003-Embryo | Mike Goedecke | Short film, |
| 2002 | Papal Cab | Kevin Susman | |
| 2002 | The Ring | Gore Verbinski | Additional music, with Hans Zimmer |
| 2002 | Spirit: Stallion of the Cimarron | Kelly Asbury & Lorna Cook | Additional arrangements |
| 2002 | The Time Machine | Simon Wells | Additional arrangements |
| 2003 | Agua Dulce | Edgar Pablos | Short |
| 2003 | Come Lovely | Jake Davis | Short |
| 2003 | Things Fall Apart | Yaniv Raz | Short |
| 2003 | Life After War | Brian Knappenberger | Documentary |
| 2003 | Something's Gotta Give | Nancy Meyers | Additional music |
| 2003 | Matchstick Men | Ridley Scott | Additional music |
| 2003 | Pirates of the Caribbean: The Curse of the Black Pearl | Gore Verbinski | Additional music |
| 2003 | Tears of the Sun | Antoine Fuqua | Additional music |
| 2004 | Thunderbirds | Jonathan Frakes | Additional music |
| 2004 | King Arthur | Antoine Fuqua | Additional music |
| 2004 | Frenching | Kellie Martin | Short film |
| 2005 | The Madagascar Penguins in a Christmas Caper | Gary Trousdale | Short film |
| 2005 | Wallace & Gromit: The Curse of the Were-Rabbit | Nick Park and Steve Box | Additional music |
| 2005 | Madagascar | Eric Darnell and Tom McGrath | Additional music |
| 2005 | The Amityville Horror | Andrew Douglas | Additional music |
| 2006 | The Da Vinci Code | Ron Howard | Additional music |
| 2006 | First Flight | Cameron Hood and Kyle Jefferson | Short film |
| 2006 | Impy's Island | Reinhard Klooss and Holger Tappe | |
| 2006 | When a Stranger Calls | Simon West | |
| 2007 | Daddy Day Camp | Fred Savage | |
| 2007 | The Simpsons Movie | David Silverman | Additional music |
| 2007 | Electroland | Gabriel London | Documentary short |
| 2007 | The Mars Underground | Scott Gill | Documentary, |
| 2007 | Pirates of the Caribbean: At World's End | Gore Verbinski | Additional arrangements |
| 2007 | Young@Heart | Stephen Walker | Documentary, wrote and performed "Crimson Joy" |
| 2008 | Madagascar: Escape 2 Africa | Eric Darnell & Tom McGrath | Additional music |
| 2008 | Impy's Island 2 | Reinhard Klooss & Holger Tappe | |
| 2008 | Bachelor Party 2: The Last Temptation | James Ryan | Video |
| 2008 | The Little Mermaid: Ariel's Beginning | Peggy Holmes | Video |
| 2009 | Obsessed | Steve Shill | |
| 2011 | Son of Mourning | Yaniv Raz | |
| 2011 | The Forger | Lawrence Roeck | |
| 2012 | Slumber Party Slaughter | Rebekah Chaney | |
| 2012 | The Longest Daycare | David Silverman | Short, additional music |
| 2012 | Buzkashi Boys | Sam French | Short |
| 2013 | Barbie in the Pink Shoes | Owen Hurley | Video |
| 2014 | 10 Cent Pistol | Michael C. Martin | |
| 2014 | Barbie: The Pearl Princess | Ezekiel Norton | Video |
| 2014 | The Simpsons Take the Bowl | David Silverman and Mike Anderson | Video |
| 2015 | Toxin | Jason Dudek | |
| 2016 | Fifty Shades of Black | Michael Tiddes | |
| 2016 | Satanic | Jeffrey G. Hunt | |
| 2017 | Heartthrob | Chris Sivertson | |
| 2019 | Secret Obsession | Peter Sullivan | |
| 2020 | Playdate with Destiny | David Silverman | Short |
| TBA | Dr. Bird's Advice for Sad Poets | Yaniv Raz | Post-production |

=== TV ===
| Year | Title | Notes |
|---|---|---|
| 2001 | Area 52 | TV movie |
| 2002 | ESPN – "Citation" | |
| 2002 | ESPN – "Richard Flowers" | |
| 2002 | Ascent: The Story of Hugh Herr | TV movie documentary |
| 2003 | Dean Kamen | TV movie documentary |
| 2003 | The Louisiana Purchase | TV movie |
| 2003 | Frontline/World | TV series documentary, 2 episodes |
| 2003 | Rebels of Oakland: The A's, the Raiders, the '70s | TV movie documentary |
| 2003 | Space Ghost Coast to Coast | 1 episode |
| 2003–2004 | Skin | Mini-series |
| 2004 | Life on Liberty Street | TV movie |
| 2004 | Hollywood Mom's Mystery | TV movie |
| 2005 | Jane Doe: Now You See It, Now You Don't | TV movie |
| 2005 | Detective | TV movie |
| 2005 | Ordinary Miracles | TV movie |
| 2005 | The Contender | |
| 2006 | What About Brian | 2 episodes |
| 2007–2009 | Pushing Daisies | |
| 2009 | Crisis: New York Under Water | TV movie |
| 2010 | Neighbors from Hell | |
| 2011 | Wilfred | |
| 2011 | Franklin & Bash | 2 episodes |
| 2011 | Poe | TV movie |
| 2012 | Best Friends Forever | |
| 2012 | Mockingbird Lane | TV special |
| 2012 | Emily Owens M.D. | 3 episodes |
| 2013–2014 | Doctor Who Online Adventures | TV series short, 3 episodes |
| 2013 | Jinxed | TV movie |
| 2013 | Murder in Manhattan | TV movie |
| 2014 | Deliverance Creek | TV movie |
| 2014 | Dead Boss | TV movie |
| 2015 | Barbie in Princess Power | TV movie |
| 2015 | Splitting Adam | TV movie |
| 2015 | Bad Blood | TV movie |
| 2017 | A Midsummer's Nightmare | TV movie |
| 2018 | A Tale of Two Corey's | TV movie |
| 2014–2018 | The Last Ship | |
| 2018–2019 | A Series of Unfortunate Events | |
| 2019 | Kim Possible | TV movie |

=== Video games ===
| Year | Title | Notes |
|---|---|---|
| 2005 | Dead to Rights II | |
| 2005 | SOCOM 3 U.S. Navy SEALs | |
| 2005 | SOCOM U.S. Navy SEALs: Fireteam Bravo | |
| 2006 | SOCOM U.S. Navy SEALs: Combined Assault | |
| 2006 | SOCOM U.S. Navy SEALs: Fireteam Bravo 2 | |
| 2007 | The Simpsons Game | With Hans Zimmer, Chris Lennertz and Tim Wynn |
| 2007 | Def Jam: Icon | Technical staff |
| 2007 | Bee Movie Game | Cinematic score |
| 2009 | Jak and Daxter: The Lost Frontier | |
| 2009 | Infamous | |
| 2009 | Nerf N-Strike | |
| 2009 | Monsters vs. Aliens | |
| 2010 | Epic Mickey | |
| 2010 | Spider-Man Shattered Dimensions | |
| 2011 | Infamous 2 | With Bryan Mantia, Melissa Reese, Galactic and Jonathan Mayer |
| 2012 | Epic Mickey 2: The Power of Two | With Mike Himelstein |
| 2012 | Epic Mickey: Power of Illusion | With Sean Beeson |
| 2013 | BioShock Infinite | Special thanks |
| 2013 | Knack | |
| 2014 | Disney Infinity – Marvel Super Heroes | |
| 2015 | Disney Infinity: 3.0 Edition – Starter Pack | |

=== Other ===
| Year | Title | Notes |
|---|---|---|
| 2008-present | The Simpsons Ride | Universal Studios Theme Park Attraction |
| 2014-2016 | Ringling Bros. and Barnum & Bailey Circus: Legends | National tour |

== Awards ==
| Year | Award | Recipient |
|---|---|---|
| 2008 | Emmy Award for Outstanding Music Composition for a Series (Original Dramatic Score) | Pushing Daisies (for "Pigeon") |
| 2008 | Hollywood Music in Media Award for Best TV Composer | Pushing Daisies Season 1 |
| 2009 | ASCAP Award for Top-Grossing Film | Obsessed |
| 2009 | G.A.N.G. Award for Best Original Soundtrack Album | inFamous |
