= Bryan Fuller =

American screenwriter and television producer (born 1969)

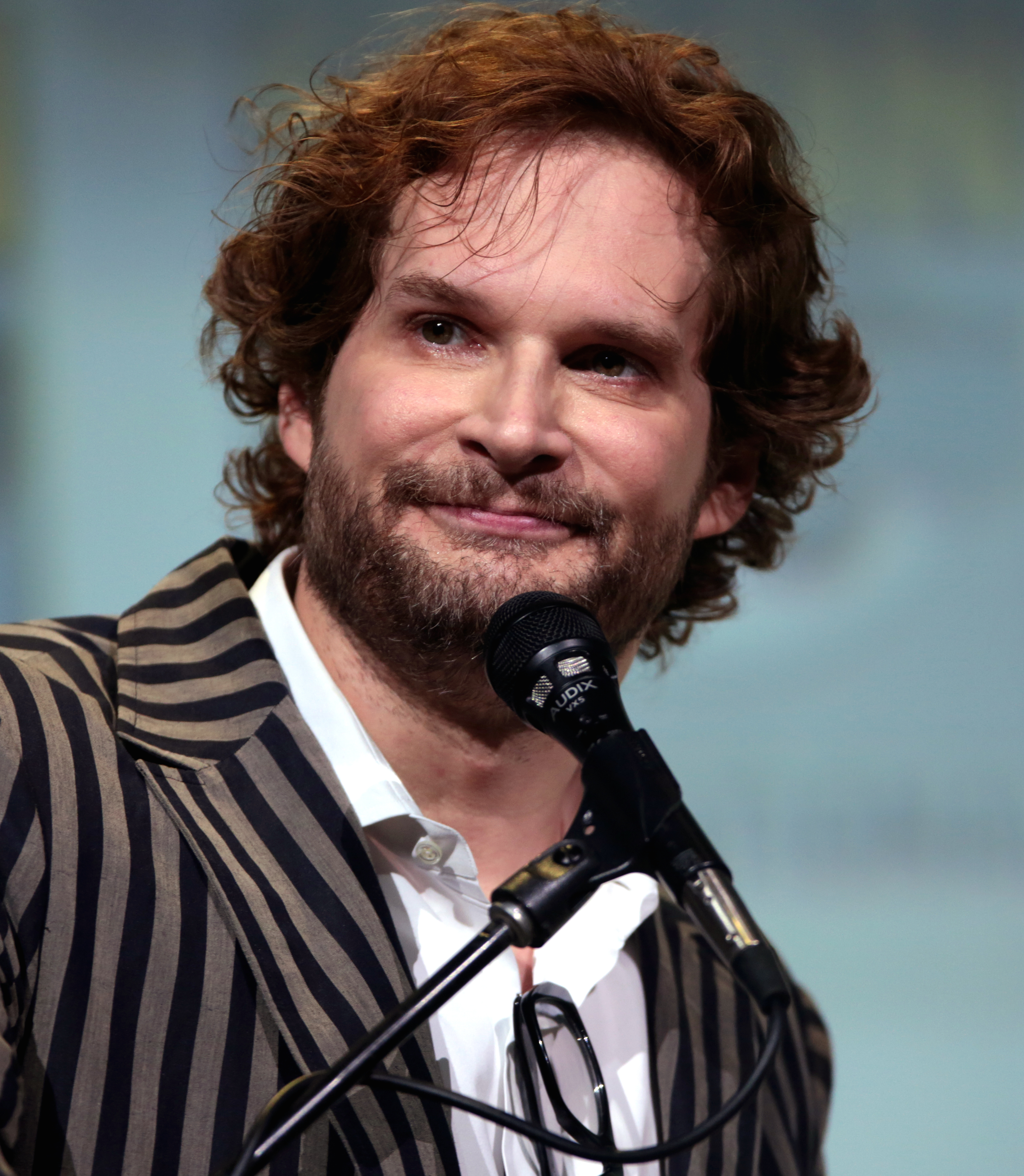
- Fuller at the 2016 Comic-Con
- Born: July 27, 1969 (age 57); Lewiston, Idaho, U.S.
- Education: Lewis-Clark State College; University of Southern California
- Occupations: Screenwriter; television producer
- Partner: Scott Roberts (2006–present)
- Writing career
- Period: 1997–present
- Genres: Horror; Macabre; Drama; Science fiction; Fantasy; Comedy

Bryan Fuller (born July 27, 1969) is an American writer, TV producer, and film director, best known for creating the television series Pushing Daisies (2007–2009) and Hannibal (2013–2015). Fuller is also known for his work as a showrunner for the first season of the show American Gods (2017–2021), as a writer on the Star Trek television series Voyager (1997–2001) and Deep Space Nine (1997), and as the co-creator of Star Trek: Discovery (2017–2024).

He made his feature film directorial debut with Dust Bunny (2025).

== Early life ==
Fuller was born in Lewiston, Idaho, and raised in Clarkston, Washington. He was brought up Roman Catholic. After graduating from Clarkston High School, Fuller attended Lewis–Clark State College in Lewiston. He later transferred to the USC School of Cinematic Arts, but dropped out and began working as an office temp.

== Career ==
As a contributing writer, Fuller's work has been featured on several shows, including Star Trek: Voyager and Star Trek: Deep Space Nine, earning twenty-two episode writing credits for the Star Trek franchise. Fuller is himself a fan of science fiction, and in an interview said that his favorite Star Trek series were the 1960s original, followed by Deep Space Nine, The Next Generation and Voyager. Fuller has called DS9 his favorite spin-off, stating: "There were lots of new and innovative things going on during Deep Space Nine and that's why it's my favorite of the new series. It was much more character-based". Fuller worked on the 1997 DS9 episodes "The Darkness and the Light" and "Empok Nor".

Fuller wrote the teleplay for the 2002 adaptation of Carrie, based on the 1974 novel of the same name by Stephen King. Next, he created Dead Like Me which ran on Showtime for two seasons from 2003 to 2004, although Fuller left early into the first season. He then co-created Wonderfalls with Todd Holland, which ran on Fox in 2004, with only four episodes being aired and the rest premiering on DVD. Near the end of 2004, Fuller got a pilot commitment from NBC for The Assistants, although the show never got past the script stage. In 2005, Fuller wrote the pilot to the animated comedy The Amazing Screw-On Head for the Sci Fi Channel, which aired in 2006 but was not picked up for a series. He next worked on NBC series Heroes, where he joined as a consulting producer after the pilot and became a co-executive producer for the first season. He also wrote a couple episodes for Heroes, including "Company Man" which TV Guide named one of the 100 greatest episodes in television history.

Next he created Pushing Daisies, about a pie-maker (Lee Pace) who can bring dead things back to life temporarily, which debuted on ABC on October 3, 2007. On July 17, 2008, the show was nominated for twelve Emmy Awards from the Academy of Television Arts & Sciences, including one for Fuller for Outstanding Writing of a Comedy Series. It ultimately won seven Emmy Awards: for Best Supporting Actress (Kristin Chenoweth), Best Art Direction, Best Costume, Best Music, Best Make-Up, Best Editing, and Best Direction of a Comedy Series (Barry Sonnenfeld). The second season of Pushing Daisies began October 1, 2008, on ABC. In mid-November, ABC announced that it would not order new episodes for season two after the 13th. The series' final episode aired on June 13, 2009.

With the cancellation of Pushing Daisies, Fuller signed a seven-figure, two-year deal with Universal Media Studios. He rejoined the writing staff of Heroes for the 20th episode of the third season, and again became a consulting producer, playing a "key role" on the writing staff. After working on some of the story arcs for the next season of Heroes, Fuller announced he was moving on to other projects. His next projects, both a result of the Universal deal and developed for NBC, were Sellevision, developed with Bryan Singer and based on the book of the same name by Augusten Burroughs, and No Kill, Fuller's first sitcom. Neither project got past the scripting stage. Fuller's next project, again for NBC, was Mockingbird Lane, a revival of the classic sitcom The Munsters. A pilot was produced, but the show did not receive a series order, and the pilot aired as a Halloween special. Fuller next worked on Mind Fields with Lisa Joy for USA Network, which was not picked up.

Fuller's next project was the Hannibal Lecter series Hannibal, which premiered on NBC in 2013, and renewed for a second season in 2014. Fuller had developed High Moon for Syfy, based on the book The Lotus Caves, which filmed a pilot in late 2013, but was not given a series order.

By July 2014, Starz had acquired the airing rights to Neil Gaiman's 2001 novel American Gods, and that Fuller, with producer Michael Green, would develop the novel into a television series. The show premiered April 30, 2017. The show was renewed for a second season, but Fuller and Green left the show due to budgetary issues during the writing stage of the second season. In early 2018, Fuller was working on a television adaptation of The Vampire Chronicles novel series by Anne Rice. He dropped out of the project in July of the same year. After leaving American Gods and Discovery, Fuller began work on his first feature film in 2021, writing a new adaptation of the 1983 Stephen King novel Christine for Sony Pictures and Blumhouse Productions, planning to make his directorial debut. In October 2022, it was announced Fuller would write a Friday the 13th prequel television series entitled Crystal Lake. He dropped out of the project in May 2024, citing creative differences.

With development on Christine stalled, Fuller turned to an original screenplay to be his feature directorial debut, Dust Bunny starring Hannibal lead actor Mads Mikkelsen.

== Fullerverse ==
Nicknamed the "Fullerverse" by Fuller's fans, all of Fuller's series are implied to take place in the same universe.

Marianne Marie Beetle (played by actress Beth Grant) first appears in the Wonderfalls episode "Muffin Buffalo", and has subsequently appeared in the Pushing Daisies episode "Comfort Food" and in the pilot of Mockingbird Lane.

Similarly, Gretchen Speck-Horowitz (played by Chelan Simmons) first appears in the Wonderfalls episode "Pink Flamingos" and subsequently appeared in the Hannibal episode "Amuse-Bouche", reverting to her maiden name after her divorce.

Meanwhile, in the Pushing Daisies episode "Bzzzzzzzzz!", Ned mentions that he works for Happy Time Temp Agency when trying to go undercover, the same place where Georgia "George" Lass works in Dead Like Me.

Also, the fictional brand "Lil' Ivey's" first appeared in the Wonderfalls episode "Cocktail Bunny" on a box of cocktail cherries and later appeared in the Pushing Daisies episode "Kerplunk", this time on a bag of macaroni.

Fuller has reinterpreted a few of his characters in later series. Georgia "George" Lass (played by Ellen Muth), having first appeared in Dead Like Me, was reinterpreted as Georgia Madchen (also played by Muth) in the Hannibal episodes "Buffet Froid" and "Relevés". This similarity is furthered by their last names: "lass" is an English (or Scots) synonym for girl while "Mädchen" is a German word meaning the same. In another nod to Georgia Lass being a reaper (therefore both dead and alive) in Dead Like Me, in Hannibal Georgia Madchen is a killer who suffers from numerous medical conditions including Cotard's syndrome, a delusion disorder that has her convinced she is actually dead.

In a similar manner, Reggie Lass from Dead Like Me (played by Britt McKillip) was reinterpreted as Miriam Lass (played by Anna Chlumsky), who first appears in the Hannibal episode "Entrée". Similarly, in the Hannibal episode "Takiawase", an acupuncturist (played by Amanda Plummer) who is under investigation for lobotomizing patients is named Katherine Pimms, which is also the cover name used by Charlotte "Chuck" Charles (played by Anna Friel) in multiple episodes of Pushing Daisies.

A visual nod to Wonderfalls was given in the Heroes first-season episode "Better Halves" when the smoosh-faced wax lion central to Wonderfalls was seen on a bedside table.

== Personal life ==
Fuller is in a long-term relationship with interior designer Scott Roberts.

In a 2007 interview, he stated that his favorite film was the 2001 French film Amélie, which was one of the inspirations for Pushing Daisies: "All the things I love are represented in that movie. It's a movie that will make me cry based on kindness as opposed to sadness."

On October 5, 2023, Fuller was accused of and sued for sexual harassment by Sam Wineman, a producer of Queer for Fear, charges Fuller denies. Claiming the lawsuit was a retaliatory attempt to extort Fuller after Wineman left the project, Fuller's attorney Bryan Freedman released the following statement: "Make no mistake, Sam Wineman will be sued for defamation based on what are 100 percent provably false statements," Freedman told Deadline Hollywood. "There is documented evidence which completely disproves the allegations against Bryan Fuller. Wineman created this fictitious story long after his gross incompetence necessitated his removal in an effort to extort AMC, Shudder, Steakhaus and Bryan Fuller." A month later, 14 individuals, 9 of whom had been on the set of Queer for Fear at the time of the supposed incident, came forward in Fuller's defense, disavowing Sam Wineman's story. Some even went so far as to condemn Wineman for unprofessional behavior.

== Filmography ==
=== Film ===
Year	Title	Director	Writer	Producer	Notes
2025	Dust Bunny	Yes	Yes	Yes	
2025	Predator: Badlands	No	Uncredited	No	Credited for "additional literary material (not on-screen)"

=== Television ===
Year	Title	Director	Writer	Executive producer	Creator	Developer	Notes
1997	Star Trek: Deep Space Nine	No	Yes	No	No	No	Episodes "The Darkness and the Light" and "Empok Nor"
1997–2001	Star Trek: Voyager	No	Yes	Yes	No	No	Wrote 21 episodes Also story editor (season 4–5), executive story editor (season 6) and co-producer (season 7)
2002	Carrie	No	Yes	Yes	No	No	Television film
2003	Dead Like Me	No	Yes	Yes	Yes	No	Wrote 2 episodes Also consulting producer
2004	Wonderfalls	No	Yes	Yes	Yes	No	Wrote 3 episodes
2006	The Amazing Screw-On Head	No	Yes	Yes	No	Yes	Animated pilot
2006–2009	Heroes	No	Yes	Co-executive	No	No	Wrote 4 episodes Also consulting producer (seasons 3–4)
2007–2009	Pushing Daisies	No	Yes	Yes	Yes	No	Wrote 3 episodes
2012	Mockingbird Lane	No	Yes	Yes	No	Yes	Pilot
2013–2015	Hannibal	No	Yes	Yes	No	Yes	Wrote 34 episodes
2014	High Moon	No	Yes	Yes	No	Yes	Pilot
2017	American Gods	No	Yes	Yes	No	Yes	Wrote 6 episodes
2017–2021	Star Trek: Discovery	No	Yes	Yes	Yes	No	Wrote 3 episodes Also executive consultant (seasons 2–3)
2018–2020	Star Trek: Short Treks	No	No	No	Yes	No	
2022	Queer for Fear: The History of Queer Horror	Yes	No	Yes	No	No	Directed 2 episodes
2026	Crystal Lake	No	Story	No	No	No	Episode: "Camp Crystal"

=== Acting roles ===
Year	Title	Role	Notes	Ref.
2004	Wonderfalls	Muse	Uncredited voice role; Episode: "Caged Bird"	
2023	The Horror of Dolores Roach	Himself	Episode: "They Called Me Magic Hands"	
2026	Carrie	Man at the Prom	Uncredited role; 2 episodes	

== Award and nominations ==
Year	Award	Category	Work	Result
2005	Writers Guild of America Award	Episodic Comedy	Wonderfalls	Nominated
2007	Writers Guild of America Award	New Series	Heroes	Nominated
2007	Primetime Emmy Award	Outstanding Drama Series	Heroes	Nominated
2008	Writers Guild of America Award	New Series	Pushing Daisies	Nominated
2008	Writers Guild of America Award	Episodic Comedy	Pushing Daisies	Nominated
2008	Edgar Award	Best Television Episode Teleplay	Pushing Daisies	Nominated
2008	Hugo Award	Best Dramatic Presentation – Long Form	Heroes	Nominated
2008	Primetime Emmy Award	Outstanding Writing for a Comedy Series	Pushing Daisies	Nominated
2014	The Dan Curtis Legacy Award			Won
