= List of American films of 2000 =

This is a list of American films released in 2000.

== Box office ==
The highest-grossing American films released in 2000, by domestic box office gross revenue, are as follows:

Highest-grossing films of 2000
Rank	Title	Distributor	Domestic gross
1	How the Grinch Stole Christmas	Universal Pictures	$260,745,620
2	Cast Away	20th Century Fox	$233,632,142
3	Mission: Impossible 2	Paramount Pictures	$215,409,889
4	Gladiator	DreamWorks Distribution	$187,705,427
5	What Women Want	Paramount Pictures	$182,811,707
6	The Perfect Storm	Warner Bros. Pictures	$182,618,434
7	Meet the Parents	Universal Pictures	$166,244,045
8	X-Men	20th Century Fox	$157,299,718
9	Scary Movie	Miramax	$157,019,771
10	What Lies Beneath	DreamWorks Distribution	$155,464,351

== January–March ==
Opening		Title	Production company	Cast and crew	Ref.
J A N U A R Y	11	The Extreme Adventures of Super Dave	MGM Home Entertainment / Metro-Goldwyn-Mayer	Peter MacDonald (director); Bob Einstein, Lorne Cameron, David Hoselton, Don Lake (screenplay); Bob Einstein, Dan Hedaya, Gia Carides, Don Lake, Steve Van Wormer, Ray Charles, Michael Buffer, Evander Holyfield, John Elway, Jim Doughan, Billy Barty, Art Irizawa, Brett Miller, Mike Walden, Carl Michael Lindner, David Barco	
J A N U A R Y	12	Next Friday	New Line Cinema / Cube Vision	Steve Carr (director); Ice Cube (screenplay); Ice Cube, Mike Epps, John Witherspoon, Tamala Jones, Tommy "Tiny" Lister Jr., Justin Pierce, Don 'D.C. Curry, Jacob Vargas, Lisa Rodriguez, Clifton Powell, Kym Whitley, Sticky Fingaz, Lobo Sebastian, Rolando Molina, Amy Hill, Robin Allen, Michael Blackson, Nicole Lydy, Michael Rapaport	
J A N U A R Y	12	My Dog Skip	Warner Bros. Pictures / Alcon Entertainment	Jay Russell (director); Gail Gilchriest (screenplay); Frankie Muniz, Diane Lane, Luke Wilson, Kevin Bacon, Cody Linley, Caitlin Wachs, Bradley Coryell, Daylan Honeycutt, Elizabeth Rice, William Butler, Hunter Hayes, Peter Crombie, Clint Howard, Harry Connick Jr.	
J A N U A R Y	14	Play It to the Bone	Touchstone Pictures	Ron Shelton (director/screenplay); Woody Harrelson, Antonio Banderas, Lolita Davidovich, Tom Sizemore, Lucy Liu, Robert Wagner, Richard Masur, Willie Garson, Cylk Cozart, Jack Carter, Aida Turturro, John Ortiz, William Utay, Joe Cortez, Bruce Buffer, Mitch Halpern, Jim Lampley, Al Bernstein, Reynaldo Rey, Eloy Casados, Henry G. Sanders, Jacob Duran, Steve Lawrence, George Foreman, Larry Merchant, Mike Tyson, Michael Buffer, Rod Stewart, Kevin Costner, Wesley Snipes, James Woods, Natasha Gregson Wagner, Drew Carey, Jennifer Tilly, Tony Curtis, Bob Arum, Buddy Greco, Gennifer Flowers, Steve Schirripa, Bill Dwyre, Bruce Trampler, Rick Reilly, Bert Sugar, Linnea Quigley, Maeve Quinlan	
J A N U A R Y	14	Supernova	Metro-Goldwyn-Mayer	Walter Hill (director); David C. Wilson (screenplay); James Spader, Angela Bassett, Peter Facinelli, Lou Diamond Phillips, Robin Tunney, Robert Forster, Wilson Cruz	
J A N U A R Y	21	The Boondock Saints	Franchise Pictures / Indican Pictures	Troy Duffy (director/screenplay); Willem Dafoe, Sean Patrick Flanery, Norman Reedus, David Della Rocco, Billy Connolly, Bob Marley, David Ferry, Dot-Marie Jones, Carlo Rota, Ron Jeremy, Gerard Parkes, Sergio Di Zio, Joe Pingue, Kevin Chapman, Don Carmody, Troy Duffy, Brian Mahoney, Richard Fitzpatrick, Scott Griffith, Viktor Pedtchenko	
J A N U A R Y	21	Down to You	Miramax Films	Kris Isacsson (director/screenplay); Freddie Prinze Jr., Julia Stiles, Selma Blair, Shawn Hatosy, Zak Orth, Ashton Kutcher, Rosario Dawson, Lucie Arnaz, Henry Winkler, Adam Carolla, Jimmy Kimmel, Zay Harding, Lauren German, Chloe Hunter, Bradley Pierce, Lola Glaudini, Alexia Landeau, Susan Blommaert, Frank Wood, Joanna P. Adler, Mark Blum	
J A N U A R Y	28	The Big Tease	Warner Bros. Pictures	Kevin Allen (director); Sacha Gervasi, Craig Ferguson (screenplay); Craig Ferguson, Frances Fisher, Mary McCormack, David Rasche, Sara Gilbert, Chris Langham, Donal Logue, Isabella Aitken, Kevin Allen, Angela McCluskey, Francine York, Nina Siemaszko, Charles Napier, Melissa Rivers, David Hasselhoff, Drew Carey, Cathy Lee Crosby	
J A N U A R Y	28	Isn't She Great	Universal Pictures	Andrew Bergman (director); Paul Rudnick (screenplay); Bette Midler, Nathan Lane, Stockard Channing, David Hyde Pierce, John Cleese, John Larroquette, Amanda Peet, Christopher McDonald, Dina Spybey, Debbie Shapiro, Larry Block, Frank Vincent, James Villemaire, Paul Benedict, Sam Street	
J A N U A R Y	28	Simpatico	Fine Line Features	Matthew Warchus (director/screenplay); David Nicholls (screenplay); Nick Nolte, Jeff Bridges, Sharon Stone, Catherine Keener, Albert Finney, Shawn Hatosy, Kimberly Williams-Paisley	
F E B R U A R Y	4	Gun Shy	Hollywood Pictures	Eric Blakeney (director/screenplay); Liam Neeson, Oliver Platt, Sandra Bullock, José Zúñiga, Richard Schiff, Mary McCormack, Mitch Pileggi, Louis Giambalvo, Michael Mantell, Michael DeLorenzo, Frank Vincent, Andrew Lauer, Rick Peters, Jerry Stahl, Michael Weatherly, Taylor Negron, Manny Perry, Paul Ben-Victor, Gregg Daniel, Ben Weber, Myndy Crist, Stacey Hayes	
F E B R U A R Y	4	Scream 3	Dimension Films	Wes Craven (director); Ehren Kruger (screenplay); David Arquette, Neve Campbell, Courteney Cox Arquette, Patrick Dempsey, Scott Foley, Lance Henriksen, Matt Keeslar, Jenny McCarthy, Emily Mortimer, Parker Posey, Deon Richmond, Kelly Rutherford, Liev Schreiber, Patrick Warburton, Jamie Kennedy, Roger L. Jackson, Josh Pais, Heather Matarazzo, Lynn McRee, Jason Mewes, Kevin Smith, Roger Corman, Carrie Fisher, Nancy O'Dell	
F E B R U A R Y	11	The Beach	20th Century Fox	Danny Boyle (director); John Hodge (screenplay); Leonardo DiCaprio, Virginie Ledoyen, Guillaume Canet, Robert Carlyle, Tilda Swinton, Paterson Joseph, Peter Youngblood Hills, Zelda Tinska, Victoria Smurfit, Staffan Kihlbom, Daniel Caltagirone, Saskia Mulder, Jukka Hiltunen, Magnus Lindgren, Lars Arentz-Hansen, Jerry Swindall, Peter Gevisser, Lidija Zovkic, Samuel Gough, Luke Parker, Emma Renae Griffiths, Abhijati 'Meuk' Jusakul	
F E B R U A R Y	11	Snow Day	Paramount Pictures / Nickelodeon Movies	Chris Koch (director); Will McRobb, Chris Viscardi (screenplay); Chevy Chase, Chris Elliott, Mark Webber, Schuyler Fisk, Jean Smart, Emmanuelle Chriqui, Iggy Pop, Pam Grier, John Schneider, Josh Peck, Jade Yorker, Damian Young, J. Adam Brown, David Paetkau, Carly Pope, Rozonda 'Chilli' Thomas, Katharine Isabelle, Zena Grey, Connor Matheus, Kea Wong, Tim Paleniuk	
F E B R U A R Y	11	The Tigger Movie	Walt Disney Pictures	Jun Falkenstein (director/screenplay); Jim Cummings, Nikita Hopkins, John Fiedler, Ken Sansom, Peter Cullen, Andre Stojka, Kath Soucie, Tom Attenborough, John Hurt	
F E B R U A R Y	15	An American Tail: The Treasure of Manhattan Island	Universal Cartoon Studios / Universal Studios Home Video	Larry Latham (director); Len Uhley (screenplay); Thomas Dekker, Lacey Chabert, Nehemiah Persoff, Erica Yohn, Dom DeLuise, Pat Musick, Elaine Bilstad, René Auberjonois, David Carradine, Ron Perlman, Tony Jay, Richard Karron, Sherman Howard, John Kassir, Dave Mallow, Doug Stone	
F E B R U A R Y	18	Boiler Room	New Line Cinema	Ben Younger (director/screenplay); Giovanni Ribisi, Vin Diesel, Ben Affleck, Nia Long, Nicky Katt, Ron Rifkin, Tom Everett Scott, Scott Caan, Jamie Kennedy, Taylor Nichols, Bill Sage, John Griesemer, Mark Webber, Christopher Fitzgerald, Jon Abrahams, Will McCormack, Anson Mount, Kirk Acevedo, Peter Maloney, Marsha Dietlein, Siobhan Fallon, Desmond Harrington, Stephen Scibetta	
F E B R U A R Y	18	Hanging Up	Columbia Pictures	Diane Keaton (director); Delia Ephron (screenplay); Meg Ryan, Diane Keaton, Lisa Kudrow, Walter Matthau, Adam Arkin, Ann Bortolotti, Cloris Leachman, Jesse James, Edie McClurg, Maree Cheatham, Myndy Crist, Celia Weston, Stephanie Ittleson	
F E B R U A R Y	18	Pitch Black	USA Films / Interscope Communications	David Twohy (director); Jim Wheat, Ken Wheat, David Twohy (screenplay); Vin Diesel, Radha Mitchell, Cole Hauser, Keith David, Lewis Fitz-Gerald, Claudia Black, Rhiana Griffith, John Moore, Simon Burke, Les Chantery, Sam Sari, Firass Dirani, Vic Wilson	
F E B R U A R Y	18	The Whole Nine Yards	Warner Bros. Pictures / Morgan Creek Productions / Franchise Pictures	Jonathan Lynn (director); Mitchell Kapner (screenplay); Bruce Willis, Matthew Perry, Rosanna Arquette, Michael Clarke Duncan, Natasha Henstridge, Amanda Peet, Kevin Pollak, Harland Williams, Stephanie Biddle	
F E B R U A R Y	23	Wonder Boys	Paramount Pictures / Mutual Film Company	Curtis Hanson (director); Steven Kloves (screenplay); Michael Douglas, Tobey Maguire, Frances McDormand, Katie Holmes, Robert Downey Jr., Rip Torn, Richard Thomas, Richard Knox, Jane Adams, Alan Tudyk, George Grizzard, Kelly Bishop, Philip Bosco, Michael Cavadias	
F E B R U A R Y	25	Reindeer Games	Dimension Films	John Frankenheimer (director); Ehren Kruger (screenplay); Ben Affleck, Gary Sinise, Charlize Theron, Donal Logue, Danny Trejo, Clarence Williams III, James Frain, Dennis Farina, Isaac Hayes, Gordon Tootoosis, Dana Stubblefield, Lonny Chapman, Ashton Kutcher, Ron Jeremy	
F E B R U A R Y	29	An Extremely Goofy Movie	Walt Disney Home Video	Douglas McCarthy (director); Scott Gorden (screenplay); Bill Farmer, Jason Marsden, Rob Paulsen, Pauly Shore, Bebe Neuwirth, Jeff Bennett, Brad Garrett, Jim Cummings, Vicki Lewis, Paddi Edwards, Kath Soucie, Jenna von Oÿ, Cree Summer, Dakin Matthews	
M A R C H	1	3 Strikes	Metro-Goldwyn-Mayer / Motion Picture Corporation of America	DJ Pooh (director/screenplay); Brian Hooks, N'Bushe Wright, Faizon Love, David Alan Grier, Antonio Fargas, Barima McKnight, Bennet Guillory, David Leisure, Dean Norris, De'Aundre Bonds, DJ Pooh, E-40, Faizon Love, George Wallace, Harmonica Fats, Meagan Good, Mo'Nique, Phil Morris, Starletta DuPois, Shawn Fonteno, Rashaan Nall, Yolanda Whittaker, Vincent Schiavelli, Jeffrey Garcia, Anthony Anderson, Big Boy, Jerry Dunphy, Mike Epps	
M A R C H	3	Drowning Mona	Destination Films	Nick Gomez (director); Peter Steinfeld (screenplay); Danny DeVito, Bette Midler, Neve Campbell, Jamie Lee Curtis, Casey Affleck, William Fichtner, Marcus Thomas, Peter Dobson, Kathleen Wilhoite, Tracey Walter, Will Ferrell, Paul Ben-Victor, Paul Schulze, Mark Pellegrino, Raymond O'Connor, Lisa Rieffel, Philip Perlman, Melissa McCarthy, Brian Doyle-Murray, Yul Vazquez	
M A R C H	3	The Next Best Thing	Paramount Pictures / Lakeshore Entertainment	John Schlesinger (director); Tom Ropelewski (screenplay); Madonna, Rupert Everett, Benjamin Bratt, Michael Vartan, Josef Sommer, Lynn Redgrave, Malcolm Stumpf, Neil Patrick Harris, Illeana Douglas, Mark Valley, Suzanne Krull, Stacy Edwards, John Carroll Lynch, Fran Bennett, George Axelrod, Jack Betts, William Mesnik, Gavin Lambert, Colton Ford, Linda Larkin, Caitlin Wachs, Katelin Petersen, Kimberley Davies, Jay Karnes	
M A R C H	3	What Planet Are You From?	Columbia Pictures	Mike Nichols (director); Garry Shandling, Michael Leeson, Ed Solomon, Peter Tolan (screenplay); Garry Shandling, Annette Bening, Greg Kinnear, Ben Kingsley, Linda Fiorentino, John Goodman, Judy Greer, Richard Jenkins, Caroline Aaron, Nora Dunn, Camryn Manheim, Ann Cusack, Jane Lynch, J.C. MacKenzie, Willie Garson, Bil Dwyer, Cathy Ladman, Jane Morris, Michael Dempsey, Stacey Travis, Brian Markinson, Octavia L. Spencer, Samantha Smith, Wade Williams, Phill Lewis, Rick Hoffman, Rick Avery, Janeane Garofalo, Sarah Silverman, Brian Tee, Gene Wolande, Danny Zorn, Harmony Smith, Cricky Long	
M A R C H	5	If These Walls Could Talk 2	HBO Films	Jane Anderson (director/screenplay); Martha Coolidge (director); Anne Heche (director/screenplay); Sylvia Sichel, Alex Sichel (screenplay); Vanessa Redgrave, Chloë Sevigny, Michelle Williams, Ellen DeGeneres, Sharon Stone, Marian Seldes, Paul Giamatti, Elizabeth Perkins, Jenny O'Hara, Marley McClean, Donald Elson, Nia Long, Natasha Lyonne, Heather McComb, Amy Carlson, Lee Garlington, Rashida Jones, Regina King, Kathy Najimy, Mitchell Anderson, George Newbern, Lucinda Jenney, Steffani Brass, Shirley MacLaine	
M A R C H	5	Life-Size	Walt Disney Television	Mark Rosman (director); Mark Rosman, Stephanie Moore (screenplay); Lindsay Lohan, Tyra Banks	
M A R C H	10	Deterrence	Paramount Classics / Moonstone Entertainment / TF1 International / Battleplan Productions	Rod Lurie (director/screenplay); Kevin Pollak, Timothy Hutton, Sheryl Lee Ralph, Clotilde Courau, Sean Astin, Badja Djola, Mark Thompson, Michael Mantell, Kathryn Morris, Ryan Cutrona, James Handy, June Lockhart, Sayed Badreya, Roger Steffens, Leslie Zemeckis, Rod Lurie, Jack Angel	
M A R C H	10	Mission to Mars	Touchstone Pictures / Spyglass Entertainment	Brian De Palma (director); Jim Thomas, John Thomas, Graham Yost (screenplay); Gary Sinise, Tim Robbins, Don Cheadle, Connie Nielsen, Jerry O'Connell, Kim Delaney, Peter Outerbridge, Kavan Smith, Jill Teed, Elise Neal, Robert Bailey Jr., Taylor Jones, Armin Mueller-Stahl, Bill Timoney	
M A R C H	10	Whispers: An Elephant's Tale	Walt Disney Pictures	Dereck Joubert (director/screenplay); Jordan Moffet, Holly Goldberg Sloan (screenplay); Angela Bassett, Joanna Lumley, Anne Archer, Debi Derryberry, Kevin Michael Richardson, Alice Ghostley, Betty White, Kat Cressida, Joan Rivers, John DiMaggio, Tone Loc, Jeannie Elias, Jim Black, Joseph Molekoa, David Mabukane, Sandor Carter	
M A R C H	12	Model Behavior	Walt Disney Television	Mark Rosman (director); David Kukoff, Mark Roshkow (screenplay); Maggie Lawson, Justin Timberlake, Kathie Lee Gifford	
M A R C H	17	Erin Brockovich	Universal Pictures / Columbia Pictures / Jersey Films	Steven Soderbergh (director); Susannah Grant (screenplay); Julia Roberts, Albert Finney, Aaron Eckhart, Marg Helgenberger, Tracey Walter, Peter Coyote, Cherry Jones, Conchata Ferrell, Scarlett Pomers, Michael Harney, Veanne Cox, Scotty Leavenworth, Gina Gallego, T.J. Thyne, Valente Rodriguez, Erin Brockovich, Edward L. Masry, Joe Chrest, Pat Skipper, William Lucking, Mimi Kennedy, Scott Sowers, Wade Williams, Michael Shamberg, Adilah Barnes, Gemmenne de la Peña, Jamie Harrold	
M A R C H	17	Final Destination	New Line Cinema	James Wong (director/screenplay); Glen Morgan, Jeffrey Reddick (screenplay); Devon Sawa, Ali Larter, Kerr Smith, Seann William Scott, Amanda Detmer, Tony Todd, Kristin Cloke, Daniel Roebuck, Roger Guenveur Smith, Chad E. Donella, Brendan Fehr, Christine Chatelain, Barbara Tyson, Robert Wisden, Randy Stone, Mark Holden, Fred Keating, Kristina Matisic, James Bamford, Alessandro Juliani, Lisa Marie Caruk, Forbes Angus, James Kirk	
M A R C H	22	Romeo Must Die	Warner Bros. Pictures / Silver Pictures	Andrzej Bartkowiak (director); Eric Bernt, John Jarrell (screenplay); Jet Li, Aaliyah, Isaiah Washington, Russell Wong, Delroy Lindo, D.B. Woodside, Henry O, Edoardo Ballerini, Anthony Anderson, DMX, Terry Chen, Byron Lawson, Benz Antoine, Tseng Cheng, Tong Lung, Lance Gibson, Grace Park, Manoj Sood, Fatima Robinson, Francoise Yip, Alvin Sanders, Kandyse McClure, Jon Kit Lee, Matthew Harrison, Kendall Saunders, Colin Foo	
M A R C H	24	Ghost Dog: The Way of the Samurai	Artisan Entertainment	Jim Jarmusch (director/screenplay); Forest Whitaker, John Tormey, Cliff Gorman, Henry Silva, Isaach de Bankolé, Tricia Vessey, Victor Argo, Camille Winbush, Richard Portnow, Frank Adonis, RZA, Gary Farmer, Shi Yan Ming	
M A R C H	24	Here on Earth	20th Century Fox / Fox 2000 Pictures	Mark Piznarski (director); Michael Seitzman (screenplay); Chris Klein, Leelee Sobieski, Josh Hartnett, Annette O'Toole, Bruce Greenwood, Michael Rooker, Stuart Wilson, Elaine Hendrix, Annie Corley	
M A R C H	24	Waking the Dead	USA Films / Gramercy Pictures / Egg Pictures	Keith Gordon (director); Robert Dillon (screenplay); Billy Crudup, Jennifer Connolly, Molly Parker, Janet McTeer, Paul Hipp, Sandra Oh, Hal Holbrook, John Carroll Lynch, Ivonne Coll, Lawrence Dane, Larry Marshall, Stanley Anderson, Patricia Gage, Bruce Dinsmore, Mimi Kuzyk, Walter Massey, Bernard Behrens, Leah Pinsent, Walt MacPherson, Vlasta Vrana, Rafael Petardi, Sandra Caldwell, Ed Cambridge	
M A R C H	24	Whatever It Takes	Columbia Pictures / Phoenix Pictures	David Raynr (director); Mark Schwahn (screenplay); Shane West, Marla Sokoloff, James Franco, Jodi Lyn O'Keefe, Julia Sweeney, Aaron Paul, Colin Hanks, Kip Pardue, Manu Intiraymi, David Koechner, Richard Schiff, Christine Lakin, Nick Cannon, Scott Vickaryous, Nicole Tarantini, Shyla Marlin, Vamessa Evigan	
M A R C H	28	Leprechaun in the Hood	Trimark Pictures	Rob Spera (director); Doug Hall, Jon Huffman (screenplay); Warwick Davis, Ice-T, Anthony Montgomery, Rashaan Nall, Dan Martin, Coolio, Red Grant, Lobo Sebastian, Ivory Ocean, Barima McKnight, Jack Ong, Eric Mansker, Steven M. Porter	
M A R C H	31	High Fidelity	Touchstone Pictures	Stephen Frears (director); D.V. DeVincentis, Steve Pink, John Cusack, Scott Rosenberg (screenplay); John Cusack, Iben Hjejle, Jack Black, Todd Louiso, Tim Robbins, Joan Cusack, Catherine Zeta-Jones, Lisa Bonet, Sara Gilbert, Lili Taylor, Joelle Carter, Chris Rehmann, Ben Carr, Natasha Gregson Wagner, Drake Bell, Bruce Springsteen, Ian Williams, Al Johnson	
M A R C H	31	Love & Sex	Lions Gate Entertainment	Valerie Breiman (director/screenplay); Famke Janssen, Jon Favreau, Noah Emmerich, Ann Magnuson, Cheri Oteri, Josh Hopkins, Robert Knepper, Vincent Ventresca, David Steinberg, Elimu Nelson, Yvonne Zima, Melissa Fitzgerald, Will Rothhaar, Rance Howard, Claudia Christian, David Schwimmer	
M A R C H	31	Price of Glory	New Line Cinema	Carlos Ávila (director); Phil Berger (screenplay); Jimmy Smits, Maria del Mar, Jon Seda, Clifton Collins Jr., Ron Perlman, Louis Mandylor, Ernesto Hernandez, Sal Lopez, Danielle Camastra, Paul Rodriguez, Jeff Langton	
M A R C H	31	The Road to El Dorado	DreamWorks	Bibo Bergeron, Will Finn (directors); Ted Elliott, Terry Rossio (screenplay); Kevin Kline, Kenneth Branagh, Rosie Perez, Armand Assante, Edward James Olmos, Jim Cummings, Frank Welker, Tobin Bell, Elton John, Steve Bulen, Murphy Dunne, Bobby Edner, Elisa Gabrielli, Mike Gomez, Nicholas Guest, Lauri Johnson, Luisa Leschin, Anne Lockhart, Al Rodrigo, Michelle Ruff, Aaron Spann	
M A R C H	31	The Skulls	Universal Pictures / Original Film	Rob Cohen (director); John Pogue (screenplay); Joshua Jackson, Paul Walker, Craig T. Nelson, Hill Harper, Leslie Bibb, Christopher McDonald, Steve Harris, William L. Petersen, David Asman, Scott Gibson, Nigel Bennett, Noah Danby	

== April–June ==
Opening		Title	Production company	Cast and crew	Ref.
A P R I L	5	Black and White	Screen Gems	James Toback (director/screenplay); Robert Downey Jr., Gaby Hoffmann, Allan Houston, Jared Leto, Method Man, Joe Pantoliano, Bijou Phillips, Oli "Power" Grant, Raekwon, Claudia Schiffer, Brooke Shields, Scott Caan, Mike Tyson, Elijah Wood, Ben Stiller, Stacy Edwards, Kidada Jones, Marla Maples, William Lee Scott, Eddie Kaye Thomas, Frank Adonis, Jaime McAdams, Michael B. Jordan	
A P R I L	7	Joe Gould's Secret	USA Films	Stanley Tucci (director); Howard A. Rodman (screenplay); Ian Holm, Stanley Tucci, Patricia Clarkson, Hope Davis, Susan Sarandon, Celia Weston, Patrick Tovatt, Sarah Hyland, Hallee Hirsh, John Tormey, Nell Campbell, Ron Ryan, Allan Corduner, Merwin Goldsmith, Laura Hughes, Steve Martin, James Hanlon, David Wohl, Julie Halston, Aida Turturro, Alice Drummond, Justine Johnson, Andre Belgrader, Ben Shenkman, Katy Hansz, Harry Bugin	
A P R I L	7	Ready to Rumble	Warner Bros. Pictures / Bel-Air Entertainment	Brian Robbins (director); Steven Brill (screenplay); David Arquette, Oliver Platt, Scott Caan, Bill Goldberg, Rose McGowan, Diamond Dallas Page, Richard Lineback, Steve "Sting" Borden, Joe Pantoliano, Martin Landau, Ahmet Zappa, Jill Ritchie, Chris Owen, Melanie Deanne Moore, Caroline Rhea, Tait Smith, Ellen Albertini Dow, Kathleen Freeman, Lewis Arquette, Bam Bam Bigelow, Randy Savage, Booker T, Sid Vicious, Juventud Guerrera, Curt Hennig, Disco Inferno, Billy Kidman, Konnan, Rey Mysterio Jr., Perry Saturn, Prince Iaukea, Van Hammer, Gorgeous George, Michael Buffer, Gene Okerlund, Tony Schiavone, Mike Tenay, Charles Robinson, Billy Silverman, The Nitro Girls, John Cena	
A P R I L	7	Return to Me	Metro-Goldwyn-Mayer	Bonnie Hunt (director/screenplay); Don Lake (screenplay); David Duchovny, Minnie Driver, Carroll O'Connor, Robert Loggia, Bonnie Hunt, David Alan Grier, Joely Richardson, James Belushi, Eddie Jones, William Bronder, Marianne Muellerleile, Dick Cusack, Joseph Gian, Tom Virtue, David Pasquesi, Don Lake, Brian Howe, Chris Barnes, Tim O'Malley	
A P R I L	7	Rules of Engagement	Paramount Pictures	William Friedkin (director); Stephen Gaghan (screenplay); Tommy Lee Jones, Samuel L. Jackson, Ben Kingsley, Guy Pearce, Bruce Greenwood, Anne Archer, Blair Underwood, Philip Baker Hall, Dale Dye, Mark Feuerstein, Richard McGonagle, Baoan Coleman, Nicky Katt, Ryan Hurst, Gordon Clapp, Amidou, Thom Barry, Kevin Cooney, Hayden Tank, Ahmed Abounouom, Bonnie Johnson, Attifi Mohamed, Zouheir Mohamed, Helen Manning, David Graf, Conrad Backmann, G. Gordon Liddy	
A P R I L	9	Angels in the Infield	Walt Disney Television	Robert King (director); Robert King, Garrett K. Shiff (screenplay); Patrick Warburton, Britt Irvin, David Alan Grier, Kurt Fuller	
A P R I L	14	28 Days	Columbia Pictures	Betty Thomas (director); Susannah Grant (screenplay); Sandra Bullock, Viggo Mortensen, Dominic West, Elizabeth Perkins, Diane Ladd, Steve Buscemi, Azura Skye, Alan Tudyk, Reni Santoni, Marianne Jean-Baptiste, Mike O'Malley, Margo Martindale, Susan Krebs, Elijah Kelley	
A P R I L	14	American Psycho	Lions Gate Films	Mary Harron (director/screenplay); Guinevere Turner (screenplay); Christian Bale, Willem Dafoe, Jared Leto, Josh Lucas, Samantha Mathis, Chloë Sevigny, Cara Seymour, Justin Theroux, Reese Witherspoon, Matt Ross, Bill Sage, Guinevere Turner, Krista Sutton, Stephen Bogaert	
A P R I L	14	Keeping the Faith	Touchstone Pictures / Spyglass Entertainment	Edward Norton (director); Stuart Blumberg (screenplay); Ben Stiller, Jenna Elfman, Edward Norton, Eli Wallach, Anne Bancroft, Miloš Forman, Holland Taylor, Lisa Edelstein, Rena Sofer, Bodhi Elfman, Brian George, Ron Rifkin, David Wain, Ken Leung, Susie Essman, Catherine Lloyd Burns, Radio Man, Brian Anthony Wilson, Eugene Katz	
A P R I L	14	Where the Money Is	USA Films / Intermedia Films / Scott Free Productions	Marek Kanievska (director); E. Max Frye, Topper Lilien, Carroll Cartwright (screenplay); Paul Newman, Linda Fiorentino, Dermot Mulroney, Susan Barnes, Anne Pitoniak, Bruce MacVittie, Irma St. Paule, Dorothy Gordon, Rita Tuckett, Diane Amos, Dawn Ford, T. J. Kenneally, Rod McLachlan, Charles S. Doucet, Arthur Holden, Frankie Faison, Vlasta Vrána, Heather Hiscox, Michael Brockman	
A P R I L	21	Gossip	Warner Bros. Pictures / Village Roadshow Pictures	Davis Guggenheim (director); Gregory Poirier, Theresa Rebeck (screenplay); James Marsden, Lena Headey, Norman Reedus, Kate Hudson, Marisa Coughlan, Joshua Jackson, Eric Bogosian, Edward James Olmos, Sharon Lawrence, Anthony J. Mifsud, Novie Edwards	
A P R I L	21	Love & Basketball	New Line Cinema / 40 Acres and a Mule Filmworks	Gina Prince-Bythewood (director/screenplay); Sanaa Lathan, Omar Epps, Dennis Haysbert, Debbi Morgan, Alfre Woodard, Harry J. Lennix, Boris Kodjoe, Gabrielle Union, Monica Calhoun, Regina Hall, Christine Dunford, Tyra Banks, Al Foster, Kyla Pratt, Glenndon Chatman, Naykia Harris	
A P R I L	21	U-571	Universal Pictures / StudioCanal / Dino De Laurentiis Company	Jonathan Mostow (director/screenplay); Sam Montgomery, David Ayer (screenplay); Matthew McConaughey, Bill Paxton, Harvey Keitel, Thomas Kretschmann, Jon Bon Jovi, David Keith, Jake Weber, Jack Noseworthy, Tom Guiry, Will Estes, T. C. Carson, Erik Palladino, Dave Power, Derk Cheetwood, Matthew Settle, Gunter Wurger, Oliver Stokowski, Burnell Tucker	
A P R I L	21	The Virgin Suicides	Paramount Classics / American Zoetrope	Sofia Coppola (director/screenplay); James Woods, Kathleen Turner, Kirsten Dunst, Josh Hartnett, A. J. Cook, Michael Paré, Hanna R. Hall, Leslie Hayman, Chelse Swain, Jonathan Tucker, Noah Shebib, Robert Schwartzman, Scott Glenn, Danny DeVito, Hayden Christensen, Joe Dinicol, Sherry Miller, Kristin Fairlie, Sally Cahill, Giovanni Ribisi	
A P R I L	28	The Big Kahuna	Lions Gate Films	John Swanbeck (director); Roger Rueff (screenplay); Kevin Spacey, Danny DeVito, Peter Facinelli, Paul Dawson	
A P R I L	28	Committed	Miramax Films	Lisa Krueger (director/screenplay); Heather Graham, Casey Affleck, Luke Wilson, Goran Višnjić, Alfonso Arau, Patricia Velásquez, Mark Ruffalo, Clea DuVall, Summer Phoenix, Kim Dickens, Art Alexakis, Mary Kay Place, Dylan Baker, Wood Harris, Laurel Holloman, Jon Stewart	
A P R I L	28	The Flintstones in Viva Rock Vegas	Universal Pictures / Amblin Entertainment	Brian Levant (director); Deborah Kaplan, Harry Elfont, Jim Cash, Jack Epps Jr. (screenplay); Mark Addy, Stephen Baldwin, Kristen Johnston, Jane Krakowski, Thomas Gibson, Alan Cumming, Harvey Korman, Joan Collins, Alex Meneses, Tony Longo, Danny Woodburn, John Taylor, Irwin Keyes, Taylor Negron, Mel Blanc, William Hanna, Joseph Barbera, John Stephenson, Rosie O'Donnell, John Cho, Kristen Stewart, Jim Doughan, Jack McGee, Richard Karron, Chene Lawson, Beverly Sanders, Buck Kartalian, Kevin Grevioux, Steve Schirripa, Ted Rooney, Jason Kravits, Michael Ray Bower, Joe Davis, Paul Ganus, Leslie Hoffman, Buddy Joe Hooker, Monica Staggs, Scott L. Schwartz, Allan Trautman, Spice Williams-Crosby	
A P R I L	28	Frequency	New Line Cinema	Gregory Hoblit (director); Toby Emmerich (screenplay); Dennis Quaid, Jim Caviezel, Andre Braugher, Elizabeth Mitchell, Noah Emmerich, Shawn Doyle, Melissa Errico, Jordan Bridges, Peter MacNeill, Michael Cera, Marin Hinkle, Brian Greene	
A P R I L	28	Timecode	Screen Gems	Mike Figgis (director/screenplay); Saffron Burrows, Salma Hayek, Stellan Skarsgård, Jeanne Tripplehorn, Xander Berkeley, Golden Brooks, Viveka Davis, Richard Edson, Glenne Headly, Holly Hunter, Danny Huston, Daphna Kastner, Kyle MacLachlan, Mia Maestro, Leslie Mann, Suzy Nakamura, Alessandro Nivola, Zuleikha Robinson, Julian Sands, Steven Weber	
A P R I L	28	Where the Heart Is	20th Century Fox	Matt Williams (director); Lowell Ganz, Babaloo Mandel (screenplay); Natalie Portman, Ashley Judd, Stockard Channing, Joan Cusack, Sally Field, James Frain, Dylan Bruno, Keith David, Richard Andrew Jones, Angee Hughes, Margaret Hoard, Mackenzie Fitzgerald, Richard Nance, Bob Coonrod, Cody Linley, Heather Kafka	
M A Y	5	Gladiator	DreamWorks / Universal Pictures / Scott Free Productions / Red Wagon Entertainment	Ridley Scott (director); David Franzoni, John Logan, William Nicholson (screenplay); Russell Crowe, Joaquin Phoenix, Connie Nielsen, Oliver Reed, Richard Harris, Derek Jacobi, Djimon Hounsou, David Schofield, John Shrapnel, Tomas Arana, Ralf Möeller, Spencer Treat Clark, David Hemmings, Tommy Flanagan, Sven-Ole Thorsen, Omid Djalili, Tony Curran, David Bailie, Giannina Facio, Giorgio Cantarini, Billy Dowd	
M A Y	5	I Dreamed of Africa	Columbia Pictures	Hugh Hudson (director); Paula Milne, Susan Shiliday (screenplay); Kim Basinger, Vincent Perez, Eva Marie Saint, Daniel Craig, Liam Aiken, Garrett Strommen, Lance Reddick, Connie Chiume, Mary Craig	
M A Y	5	Michael Jordan to the Max	Giant Screen Films	Don Kempf, James D. Stern (directors); Jonathan Hock (screenplay); Michael Jordan, Phil Jackson, Doug Collins, Bob Costas, Bill Murray, Ken Griffey Jr., Steve Kerr, Spike Lee, Willie Mays, Stan Musial, Ahmad Rashad, Pat Riley	
M A Y	5	Up at the Villa	USA Films / Intermedia Films / Mirage Enterprises	Philip Haas (director); Belinda Haas (screenplay); Kristin Scott Thomas, Sean Penn, James Fox, Jeremy Davies, Derek Jacobi, Massimo Ghini, Anne Bancroft, Dudley Sutton, Roger Hammond	
M A Y	7	Geppetto	Walt Disney Television	Tom Moore (director); David I. Stern (screenplay); Drew Carey, Julia Louis-Dreyfus	
M A Y	12	Battlefield Earth	Warner Bros. Pictures / Morgan Creek Productions / Franchise Pictures	Roger Christian (director); Corey Mandell, J. David Shapiro (screenplay); John Travolta, Barry Pepper, Forest Whitaker, Kim Coates, Sabine Karsenti, Richard Tyson, Kelly Preston, Michael MacRae, Shaun Austin-Olsen, Tim Post, Michael Byrne, Christian Tessier, Sylvain Landry, Earl Pastko, Noel Burton	
M A Y	12	Center Stage	Columbia Pictures	Nicholas Hytner (director); Carol Heikkinen (screenplay); Amanda Schull, Zoë Saldana, Susan May Pratt, Peter Gallagher, Debra Monk, Ethan Stiefel, Sascha Radetsky, Donna Murphy, Julie Kent, Ilia Kulik, Eion Bailey, Shakiem Evans, Elizabeth Hubbard, Cody Green, Mauricio Sanchez, Julius Catalvas, Priscilla Lopez	
M A Y	12	Hamlet	Miramax Films	Michael Almereyda (director/screenplay); Ethan Hawke, Kyle MacLachlan, Diane Venora, Liev Schreiber, Julia Stiles, Bill Murray, Karl Geary, Steve Zahn, Sam Shepard, Paula Malcomson, Dechen Thurman, Rome Neal, Jeffrey Wright, Paul Bartel, Casey Affleck, Robert Thurman, Tim Blake Nelson, Larry Fessenden	
M A Y	12	Held Up	Trimark Pictures	Steve Rash (director); Jeff Eastin, Erik Fleming (screenplay); Jamie Foxx, Nia Long, Barry Corbin, John Cullum, Roselyn Sánchez, Sarah Paulson, Dalton James, Eduardo Yáñez, Jake Busey, Natalia Cigliuti, Julie Hagerty, Ryan Phillippe, Herta Ware, Andrew Jackson, Sam Gifaldi, Diego Fuentes, Sam Vlahos, Billy Morton, Harper Roisman, Gary Owen, Chris Scott, Tim Dixon, Gerry Quigley, Michael Shamus Wiles	
M A Y	12	Screwed	Universal Pictures	Scott Alexander, Larry Karaszewski (directors/screenplay); Norm Macdonald, Dave Chappelle, Danny DeVito, Elaine Stritch, Daniel Benzali, Sherman Hemsley, Sarah Silverman, Lochlyn Munro, Malcolm Stewart, Lorena Gale, Mark Acheson, Samantha Ferris, April Telek, Ken Kirzinger, Camille Sullivan, Brent Butt, Robert Moloney, Tygh Runyan	
M A Y	19	Dinosaur	Walt Disney Pictures	Ralph Zondag, Eric Leighton (directors); John Harrison, Robert Nelson Jacobs (screenplay); D.B. Sweeney, Ossie Davis, Alfre Woodard, Max Casella, Hayden Panettiere, Samuel E. Wright, Julianna Margulies, Joan Plowright, Della Reese, Matt Adler, Zachary Bostrom, Cathy Cavadini, Greg Finley, Jeff Fischer, Daran Norris, Eve Sabara, Aaron Spann, Andrea Taylor, Camille Winbush, Billy West, Peter Siragusa	
M A Y	19	Road Trip	DreamWorks / The Montecito Picture Company	Todd Phillips (director/screenplay); Scot Armstrong (screenplay); Breckin Meyer, Seann William Scott, Amy Smart, Paulo Costanzo, DJ Qualls, Rachel Blanchard, Anthony Rapp, Andy Dick, Fred Ward, Tom Green, Ethan Suplee, Jaclyn DeSantis, Jessica Cauffiel, Mary Lynn Rajskub, Kohl Sudduth, Wendell B. Harris Jr., Rini Bell, Edmund Lyndeck, Ellen Albertini Dow, Horatio Sanz, Rhoda Griffis, Jimmy Kimmel, Mia Amber Davis, Todd Phillips	
M A Y	19	Small Time Crooks	DreamWorks	Woody Allen (director/screenplay); Woody Allen, Tracey Ullman, Elaine May, Hugh Grant, Elaine Stritch, Michael Rapaport, Tony Darrow, Jon Lovitz, Brian Markinson, George Grizzard, Larry Pine, Kristine Nielsen	
M A Y	20	Cheaters	HBO Films	John Stockwell (director/screenplay); Jeff Daniels, Jena Malone, Paul Sorvino, Luke Edwards, Blake Heron, Dov Tiefenbach, Dan Warry-Smith, Anna Raj, Dominik Podbielski, Ned Eisenberg, Robert Joy, Lenka Peterson, Alex Poch Goldin, Karen Glave, Marcia Bennett, Jackie Richardson, Jeffrey Wright (as Jeff Wright), Karyn Dwyer, Monica Kowalczuk, Bill Lake, Yank Azman, Boyd Banks, Tina Atkins, K.C. Collins, Lynne Deragon, Dan Gallagher, Melody Garrett, Tamara Handler, Kyra Harper, Thomas Hauff, John Healy, James Kirchner, Jefferson Mappin, John Stockwell, Richard M. Daley	
M A Y	24	Mission: Impossible 2	Paramount Pictures	John Woo (director); Robert Towne (screenplay); Tom Cruise, Dougray Scott, Thandie Newton, Ving Rhames, Richard Roxburgh, John Polson, Brendan Gleeson, Rade Šerbedžija, Anthony Hopkins, William Mapother, Dominic Purcell, Mathew Wilkinson	
M A Y	26	Passion of Mind	Paramount Classics	Alain Berliner (director); Ronald Bass, David Field (screenplay); Demi Moore, Stellan Skarsgård, William Fichtner, Peter Riegert, Sinead Cusack, Julianne Nicholson, Joss Ackland, Gerry Bamman, Eloise Eonnet	
M A Y	26	Shanghai Noon	Touchstone Pictures / Spyglass Entertainment	Tom Dey (director); Alfred Gough, Miles Millar (screenplay); Jackie Chan, Owen Wilson, Lucy Liu, Xander Berkeley, Walton Goggins, Brandon Merrill, Roger Yuan, Kate Luyben, Jason Connery, Simon R. Baker, Henry O, Yu Rongguang, Eric Chen, Yuen Biao	
J U N E	2	Big Momma's House	20th Century Fox / Regency Enterprises	Raja Gosnell (director); Darryl Quarles, Don Rhymer (screenplay); Martin Lawrence, Nia Long, Paul Giamatti, Terrence Howard, Anthony Anderson, Jascha Washington, Ella Mitchell, Tichina Arnold, Octavia Spencer, Cedric the Entertainer, Carl Wright, Aldis Hodge, Edwin Hodge, Brian Palermo, Phyllis Applegate, Starletta DuPois, Jessie Mae Holmes, Nicole Prescott	
J U N E	2	Running Free	Columbia Pictures	Sergei Bodrov (director); Jeanne Rosenberg (screenplay); Chase Moore, Jan Decleir, Arie Verveen, Maria Geelbooi	
J U N E	9	Gone in 60 Seconds	Touchstone Pictures / Jerry Bruckheimer Films	Dominic Sena (director); Scott Rosenberg (screenplay); Nicolas Cage, Angelina Jolie, Giovanni Ribisi, Delroy Lindo, Will Patton, Christopher Eccleston, Chi McBride, Robert Duvall, Vinnie Jones, Scott Caan, T. J. Cross, James Duval, Timothy Olyphant, William Lee Scott, Grace Zabriskie, Frances Fisher, Stephen Shellen, Trevor Goddard, Master P, Carmen Argenziano, Bodhi Elfman, Arye Gross, Dan Hildebrand, Michael Pena, John Carroll Lynch	
J U N E	16	Boys and Girls	Dimension Films	Robert Iscove (director); Andrew Lowery, Andrew Miller (screenplay); Freddie Prinze Jr., Claire Forlani, Jason Biggs, Amanda Detmer, Heather Donahue, Alyson Hannigan, Monica Arnold, Matt Schulze, Brendon Ryan Barrett, Blake Shields, Tsianina Joelson, Tim Griffin, Brian Poth, Lisa Eichhorn, Lee Garlington, Susan Kellermann, Kylie Bax, Kristy Hinze, Ines Rivero, Renate Verbaan, Carrie Ann Inaba, Diane Mizota, Nancy O'Meara, Zach Woodlee	
J U N E	16	Shaft	Paramount Pictures	John Singleton (director/screenplay); Shane Salerno, Richard Price (screenplay); Samuel L. Jackson, Vanessa L. Williams, Jeffrey Wright, Christian Bale, Busta Rhymes, Dan Hedaya, Toni Collette, Richard Roundtree, Ruben Santiago-Hudson, Josef Sommer, Lynne Thigpen, Philip Bosco, Pat Hingle, Lee Tergesen, Daniel von Bargen, Sonja Sohn, Peter McRobbie, Zach Grenier, Andre Royo, Mekhi Phifer, Catherine Kellner, Elizabeth Banks, Evan Farmer, Will Chase, Jeff Branson, Jerome Preston Bates, Caprice Benedetti, Gordon Parks, Joan Baker, Alice Dinnean, Carson Grant, Isaac Hayes, Doug Hutchison, Deirdre Lovejoy, Dorian Missick, Gloria Reuben, Mustafa Shakir, John Singleton, Peter Stickles	
J U N E	16	Titan A.E.	20th Century Fox	Don Bluth, Gary Goldman (directors); Ben Edlund, John August, Joss Whedon (screenplay); Matt Damon, Drew Barrymore, Bill Pullman, John Leguizamo, Nathan Lane, Janeane Garofalo, Ron Perlman, Tone Loc, Jim Breuer, Christopher Scarabosio, Jim Cummings, Charles Rocket, Ken Hudson Campbell, Tsai Chin, David L. Lander, Roger L. Jackson, Alex D. Linz, Crystal Scales	
J U N E	16	The Woman Chaser	Definitive Films / Tarmac Films	Robinson Devor (director/screenplay); Patrick Warburton, Eugene Roche, Ron Morgan, Emily Newman, Paul Malevich, Lynette Bennett, Joe Durrenberger, Ernie Vincent, Josh Hammond	
J U N E	21	Chicken Run	DreamWorks / Pathé / Aardman Animations	Peter Lord, Nick Park (directors); Karey Kirkpatrick (screenplay); Mel Gibson, Julia Sawalha, Timothy Spall, Phil Daniels, Tony Haygarth, Miranda Richardson, Imelda Staunton, Jane Horrocks, Benjamin Whitrow, Lynn Ferguson	
J U N E	23	Me, Myself & Irene	20th Century Fox	Peter Farrelly, Bobby Farrelly (directors/screenplay); Mike Cerrone (screenplay); Jim Carrey, Renée Zellweger, Chris Cooper, Robert Forster, Richard Jenkins, Zen Gesner, Michael Bowman, Rob Moran, Daniel Greene, Anthony Anderson, Mongo Brownlee, Jerod Mixon, Tony Cox, Mike Cerrone, Steve Sweeney, Traylor Howard, Lenny Clarke, Richard Tyson, Danny Murphy, Rex Allen Jr., Ezra Buzzington, Shannon Whirry, Lina Teal, Anna Kournikova, Cam Neely, Conrad Goode, J.B. Rogers, Brendan Shanahan, Richard Pryor, Chris Rock	
J U N E	28	The Patriot	Columbia Pictures / Centropolis Entertainment	Roland Emmerich (director); Robert Rodat (screenplay); Mel Gibson, Heath Ledger, Jason Isaacs, Joely Richardson, Chris Cooper, Tom Wilkinson, Lisa Brenner, Gregory Smith, Trevor Morgan, Bryan Chafin, Mika Boorem, Logan Lerman, Skye McCole Bartusiak, Tchéky Karyo, René Auberjonois, Donal Logue, Peter Woodward, Leon Rippy, Adam Baldwin, Jamieson K. Price, Jay Arlen Jones, Joey D. Vieira, Andy Stahl, Grahame Wood	
J U N E	28	Trixie	Sony Pictures Classics	Alan Rudolph (director/screenplay); John Binder (screenplay); Emily Watson, Dermot Mulroney, Nick Nolte, Nathan Lane, Brittany Murphy, Lesley Ann Warren, Will Patton, Stephen Lang, Mark Acheson, Vincent Gale, Jason Schombing, Robert Moloney, Troy Yorke, Ken Kirzinger, Jonathon Young, Terry Chen, Gary Jones, Zak Santiago Alam, Tyler Labine, Norman Armour, Alvin Sanders, Peter Bryant, Kate Robbins, Brendan Fletcher, Terrence Kelly	
J U N E	30	The Adventures of Rocky and Bullwinkle	Universal Pictures	Des McAnuff (director); Kenneth Lonergan (screenplay); Rene Russo, Jason Alexander, Robert De Niro, Piper Perabo, Randy Quaid, Kel Mitchell, Kenan Thompson, Rocky the Flying Squirrel, Bullwinkle J. Moose, Paget Brewster, Janeane Garofalo, Carl Reiner, Jonathan Winters, John Goodman, James Rebhorn, David Alan Grier, Ed Gale, Lily Nicksay, Jon Polito, Don Novello, Victor Raider-Wexler, Phil Proctor, Dian Bachar, Drena De Niro, Jeffrey Ross, Wesley Mann, Harrison Young, Max Grodénchik, Alexis Thorpe, Taraji P. Henson, Norman Lloyd, Mark Holton, Doug Jones, Arvie Lowe Jr., Chip Chinery, Ellis E. Williams, Elwood Edwards, Whoopi Goldberg, Billy Crystal, John Brandon, Rod Biermann, Susan Berman, Julia McAnuff, Adam Miller	
J U N E	30	The Perfect Storm	Warner Bros. Pictures	Wolfgang Petersen (director); William D. Wittliff (screenplay); George Clooney, Mark Wahlberg, Diane Lane, John C. Reilly, Mary Elizabeth Mastrantonio, William Fichtner, Bob Gunton, Karen Allen, Michael Ironside, Cherry Jones, Rusty Schwimmer, Allen Payne, John Hawkes, Janet Wright, Christopher McDonald, Dash Mihok, Josh Hopkins	

== July–September ==
Opening		Title	Production company	Cast and crew	Ref.
J U L Y	1	The Pooch and the Pauper	Walt Disney Television	Alex Zamm (director); Mark Stellen, Bennett Yellin (screenplay); Richard Karn, Fred Willard, Vincent Schiavelli, Peter MacNicol, Daryl Mitchell, George Wendt	
J U L Y	7	But I'm a Cheerleader	Lions Gate Films	Jamie Babbit (director); Brian Wayne Peterson (screenplay); Natasha Lyonne, Clea DuVall, Melanie Lynskey, RuPaul Charles, Eddie Cibrian, Wesley Mann, Richard Moll, Douglas Spain, Katharine Towne, Cathy Moriarty, Katrina Phillips, Dante Basco, Kip Pardue, Joel Michaely, Michelle Williams, Mink Stole, Bud Cort, Julie Delpy, Brandt Wille	
J U L Y	7	The Kid	Walt Disney Pictures	Jon Turteltaub (director); Audrey Wells (screenplay); Bruce Willis, Spencer Breslin, Emily Mortimer, Lily Tomlin, Jean Smart, Chi McBride, Daniel von Bargen, Dana Ivey, Susan Dalian, Stanley Anderson, Juanita Moore, Esther Scott, Deborah May, Vernee Watson-Johnson, Jan Hoag, Melissa McCarthy, Elizabeth Arlen, Alexandra Barreto, Reiley McClendon, Steve Tom, Daryl Anderson, Larry King, Jeri Ryan, Nick Chinlund, Stuart Scott, Rich Eisen, Harold Greene, Cuba Gooding Jr., Matthew Perry, Matt Hill, Tony Sampson, Sam Vincent, Gary Weeks, Sheb Wooley	
J U L Y	7	Scary Movie	Dimension Films	Keenen Ivory Wayans (director); Shawn Wayans, Marlon Wayans, Buddy Johnson, Phil Beauman, Jason Friedberg, Aaron Seltzer (screenplay); Anna Faris, Regina Hall, Marlon Wayans, Shawn Wayans, Shannon Elizabeth, Jon Abrahams, Kurt Fuller, Carmen Electra, Lochlyn Munro, Cheri Oteri, Dave Sheridan, Rick Ducommun, Jayne Trcka, Kelly Coffield Park, David L. Lander, Marissa Jaret Winokur, Tanja Reichert, James Van Der Beek, Keenen Ivory Wayans, Andrea Nemeth, Anthony McKay	
J U L Y	14	X-Men	20th Century Fox / Marvel Enterprises	Bryan Singer (director); David Hayter (screenplay); Patrick Stewart, Hugh Jackman, Ian McKellen, Halle Berry, Famke Janssen, James Marsden, Bruce Davison, Rebecca Romijn-Stamos, Ray Park, Anna Paquin, Shawn Ashmore, Tyler Mane, Stan Lee, Shawn Roberts, Tom DeSanto, George Buza, David Hayter, Rhona Shekter, Scott Leva, Aron Tager, Matt Weinberg, Adam Robitel, Wolfgang Müller, Gary Goddard, Jimmy Star, Daniel Vivian, Sumela Kay, Katrina Florece, Donald MacKinnon, Alexander Burton	
J U L Y	14	Chuck & Buck	Artisan Entertainment	Miguel Arteta (director); Mike White (screenplay); Mike White, Chris Weitz, Lupe Ontiveros, Paul Weitz, Maya Rudolph, Paul Sand, Pamela Gordon, Zak Penn, Tony Maxwell, Beth Colt, Mary Wigmore	
J U L Y	19	The In Crowd	Warner Bros. Pictures / Morgan Creek Productions	Mary Lambert (director); Mark Gibson, Philip Halprin (screenplay); Susan Ward, Lori Heuring, Matthew Settle, Nathan Bexton, Tess Harper, Laurie Fortier, Kim Murphy, Jay R. Ferguson, A. J. Buckley, Katharine Towne, Charlie Finn, Ethan Erickson, Erinn Bartlett, Peter Mackenzie, Daniel Hugh Kelly, Heather Stephens, Joanne Pankow, Taylor Negron, David Reinwald, Scot M. Sanborn	
J U L Y	21	Loser	Columbia Pictures	Amy Heckerling (director/screenplay); Jason Biggs, Mena Suvari, Greg Kinnear, Dan Aykroyd, Zak Orth, Tom Sadoski, Jimmi Simpson, Bobby Slayton, Twink Caplan, Andrea Martin, Robert Miano, Meredith Scott Lynn, Stuart Cornfeld, Taylor Negron, Catherine Black, Steven Wright, Andy Dick, Colleen Camp, David Spade, Alan Cumming, Brian Backer, Everclear	
J U L Y	21	Pokémon the Movie 2000	Warner Bros. Pictures / Nintendo / 4Kids Entertainment	Kunihiko Yuyama (director); Takeshi Shudo (screenplay); Veronica Taylor, Ikue Ōtani, Rachael Lillis, Ed Paul, Satomi Kōrogi, Eric Stuart, Maddie Blaustein, Eric Rath, Neil Stewart, Nathan Price	
J U L Y	21	What Lies Beneath	DreamWorks / 20th Century Fox / ImageMovers	Robert Zemeckis (director); Sarah Kernochan, Clark Gregg (screenplay); Harrison Ford, Michelle Pfeiffer, Diana Scarwid, Amber Valletta, Miranda Otto, James Remar, Wendy Crewson, Joe Morton, Ray Baker, Katharine Towne	
J U L Y	25	An American Tail: The Mystery of the Night Monster	Universal Cartoon Studios / Universal Studios Home Video	Larry Latham (director); Len Uhley (screenplay); Thomas Dekker, Lacey Chabert, Nehemiah Persoff, Jane Singer, Dom DeLuise, Pat Musick, Susan Boyd, Robert Hays, John Garry, Candi Milo, John Mariano, Jeff Bennett, Joe Lala, Sherman Howard	
J U L Y	25	Beethoven's 3rd	Universal Studios Home Video	David Mickey Evans (director); Jeff Schechter (screenplay); Judge Reinhold, Julia Sweeney, Joe Pichler, Jamie Marsh, Danielle Keaton, Frank Gorshin, Michaela Gallo, Mike Ciccolini, Holly Mitchell	
J U L Y	26	Thomas and the Magic Railroad	Destination Films / Gullane Pictures / Icon Film Distribution / Isle of Man Film Commission	Britt Allcroft (director/screenplay); Alec Baldwin, Peter Fonda, Mara Wilson, Edward Glen, Neil Crone, Didi Conn, Russell Means, Cody McMains, Michael E. Rodgers, Kevin Frank	
J U L Y	28	Nutty Professor II: The Klumps	Universal Pictures / Imagine Entertainment	Peter Segal (director); Barry W. Blaustein, David Sheffield, Paul Weitz, Chris Weitz (screenplay); Eddie Murphy, Janet Jackson, Larry Miller, John Ales, Richard Gant, Anna Maria Horsford, Melinda McGraw, Jamal Mixon, Gabriel Williams, Chris Elliott, Earl Boen, Nikki Cox, Freda Payne, Sylvester Jenkins, Wanda Sykes, Kym E. Whitley, Selma Stern, Barry W. Blaustein, David Sheffield, Ralph Drischell, Sonya Eddy, James D. Brubaker, Charles Napier, Miguel A. Nunez Jr., Peter Segal, Frank Welker, Kathleen Freeman	
A U G U S T	3	The New Adventures of Spin and Marty: Suspect Behavior	Walt Disney Television	Rusty Cundieff (director); David Simkins (screenplay); David Gallagher, Jeremy Foley	
A U G U S T	4	Coyote Ugly	Touchstone Pictures / Jerry Bruckheimer Films	David McNally (director); Gina Wendkos, Kevin Smith (screenplay); Piper Perabo, Adam Garcia, Maria Bello, Melanie Lynskey, Tyra Banks, John Goodman, Izabella Miko, Bridget Moynahan, Michael Weston, Melody Perkins, LeAnn Rimes, Johnny Knoxville, John Fugelsang, Jeremy Rowley, Michael Bay, Susan Yeagley, Kaitlin Olson, Alex Borstein, Carol Ann Susi, Jeremy Rowley, Ellen Cleghorne, Bud Cort, Greg Pitts, Whitney Dylan, Victor Argo, Ken Hudson Campbell, Jimmy Shubert, Jack McGee, Sarah Jane Morris, Chris Wylde, Del Pentecost, Peter Appel	
A U G U S T	4	Hollow Man	Columbia Pictures	Paul Verhoeven (director); Andrew W. Marlowe (screenplay); Kevin Bacon, Elisabeth Shue, Josh Brolin, Kim Dickens, Greg Grunberg, Joey Slotnick, Mary Randle, William Devane, Rhona Mitra, Pablo Espinosa, Margot Rose	
A U G U S T	4	Space Cowboys	Warner Bros. Pictures / Village Roadshow Pictures	Clint Eastwood (director); Ken Kaufman, Howard Klausner (screenplay); Clint Eastwood, Tommy Lee Jones, Donald Sutherland, James Garner, Marcia Gay Harden, William Devane, Loren Dean, Courtney B. Vance, James Cromwell, Rade Serbedzija, Barbara Babcock, Blair Brown, Jay Leno, Jon Hamm, Chris Wylde, Anne Stedman, Toby Stephens, Eli Craig, John Mallory Asher, Matt McColm, Billie Worley	
A U G U S T	4	The Tao of Steve	Sony Pictures Classics	Jenniphr Goodman (director/screenplay); Duncan North, Greer Goodman (screenplay); Donal Logue, Greer Goodman, James 'Kimo' Wills, Ayelet Kaznelson, David Aaron Baker, Nina Jaroslaw	
A U G U S T	8	Buzz Lightyear of Star Command: The Adventure Begins	Walt Disney Home Video / Pixar Animation Studios	Tad Stones (director); Mark McCorkle, Bob Schooley, Bill Motz, Bob Roth (screenplay); Tim Allen, Nicole Sullivan, Larry Miller, Stephen Furst, Wayne Knight, Adam Carolla, Patrick Warburton, Diedrich Bader, Kevin Michael Richardson, Charles Kimbrough, Cindy Warden, Frank Welker, Sean Hayes, Jennifer Bailey, Andrew Stanton, Jim Hanks, R. Lee Ermey, Wallace Shawn, Joe Ranft, Jeff Pidgeon	
A U G U S T	11	Autumn in New York	Metro-Goldwyn-Mayer / Lakeshore Entertainment	Joan Chen (director); Allison Burnett (screenplay); Richard Gere, Winona Ryder, Anthony LaPaglia, Elaine Stritch, Vera Farmiga, Sherry Stringfield, Jill Hennessy, J.K. Simmons, Sam Trammell, Mary Beth Hurt, Kali Rocha, Steven Randazzo, George Spielvogel III, Ranjit Chowdhry, Audrey Quock, Tawny Cypress, Daniella van Graas, Rachel Nichols, Liza Lapira	
A U G U S T	11	Bless the Child	Paramount Pictures / Icon Productions	Chuck Russell (director); Tom Rickman, Clifford Green, Ellen Green (screenplay); Kim Basinger, Jimmy Smits, Angela Bettis, Rufus Sewell, Christina Ricci, Holliston Coleman, Michael Gaston, Lumi Cavazos, Ian Holm	
A U G U S T	11	Cecil B. Demented	Artisan Entertainment	John Waters (director/screenplay); Melanie Griffith, Stephen Dorff, Alicia Witt, Adrian Grenier, Larry Gilliard Jr., Mink Stole, Ricki Lake, Patricia Hearst, Kevin Nealon, Maggie Gyllenhaal, Jack Noseworthy, Mike Shannon, Eric M. Barry, Zenzele Uzoma, Erika Lynn Rupli, Harriet Dodge, Channing Wilroy, Jeffrey Wei, Eric Roberts, Kevin Nealon, Roseanne Barr, John Waters	
A U G U S T	11	The Opportunists	First Look Pictures / DEJ Productions	Myles Connell (director/screenplay); Christopher Walken, Peter McDonald, Cyndi Lauper, Donal Logue, Vera Farmiga, John Ortiz, José Zúñiga, Tom Noonan, Anne Pitoniak, Kate Burton, Olek Krupa, Chuck Cooper, Claudia Shear, Jim Mayzik, Paul D'Amato, Wally Dunn, Branden Vega, Patrick Fitzgerald, Jerry Grayson	
A U G U S T	11	The Replacements	Warner Bros. Pictures / Bel-Air Entertainment	Howard Deutch (director); Vince McKewin (screenplay); Keanu Reeves, Gene Hackman, Brooke Langton, Orlando Jones, Faizon Love, Michael "Bear" Taliferro, Troy Winbush, David Denman, Jon Favreau, Michael Jace, Rhys Ifans, Gailard Sartain, Art LaFleur, Jack Warden, Keith David, Brett Cullen, Evan Dexter Parke, John Madden, Pat Summerall, Al Brown, Marty Wright, Ol' Dirty Bastard, Craig Sechler, Allan Graf, Lester Speight, Ace Yonamine, Archie L. Harris Jr., Sarah Ann Morris, Caroline Keenan	
A U G U S T	11	Sunset Strip	20th Century Fox / Fox 2000 Pictures	Adam Collis (director); Randall Jahnson, Russell DeGrazier (screenplay); Anna Friel, Jared Leto, Tommy Flanagan, Adam Goldberg, Nick Stahl, Rory Cochrane, Simon Baker, Darren E. Burrows, John Randolph, Stephanie Romanov, Mary Lynn Rajskub, Maurice Chasse, Mike Rad, Josh Richman	
A U G U S T	18	The Cell	New Line Cinema	Tarsem Singh (director); Mark Protosevich (screenplay); Jennifer Lopez, Vince Vaughn, Vincent D'Onofrio, Jake Weber, Dylan Baker, Marianne Jean-Baptiste, Tara Subkoff, Catherine Sutherland, Gerry Becker, Musetta Vander, Patrick Bauchau, Jake Thomas, James Gammon, Dean Norris, Lauri Johnson, Jack Conley, Kamar de los Reyes, Pruitt Taylor Vince, Kim Chizevsky-Nicholls, Vanessa Branch, Gareth Williams, Monica Lacy, Leanna Creel, Peter Sarsgaard, Colton James, John Cothran Jr.	
A U G U S T	18	The Original Kings of Comedy	Paramount Pictures / MTV Productions / Latham Entertainment / 40 Acres and a Mule Filmworks	Spike Lee (director); Steve Harvey, D. L. Hughley, Cedric the Entertainer, Bernie Mac	
A U G U S T	22	The Scarecrow	Warner Home Video / Warner Bros. Family Entertainment / Rich Animation Studios	Brian Nissen (director; screenwriter and story) and Richard Rich (director and story); Shawn Hoffman, Belinda Montgomery, Ray Porter, Corey Feldman and Paul Masonson	
A U G U S T	25	The Art of War	Warner Bros. Pictures / Morgan Creek Productions / Franchise Pictures	Christian Duguay (director); Wayne Beach, Simon Barry (screenplay); Wesley Snipes, Anne Archer, Maury Chaykin, Marie Matiko, Cary-Hiroyuki Tagawa, Liliana Komorowska, James Hong, Michael Biehn, Donald Sutherland, Ron Yuan, Paul Hopkins, Erin Selby	
A U G U S T	25	Bring It On	Universal Pictures / Beacon Pictures	Peyton Reed (director); Jessica Bendinger (screenplay); Kirsten Dunst, Eliza Dushku, Jesse Bradford, Gabrielle Union, Clare Kramer, Nicole Bilderback, Tsianina Joelson, Rini Bell, Nathan West, Shamari Fears, Natina Reed, Lindsay Sloane, Bianca Kajlich, Holmes Osborne, Sherry Hursey, Cody McMains, Ian Roberts, Ryan Drummond, Peyton Reed, Huntley Ritter, Brandi Williams, Richard Hillman, Paige Inman	
A U G U S T	25	The Crew	Touchstone Pictures	Michael Dinner (director); Barry Fanaro (screenplay); Richard Dreyfuss, Burt Reynolds, Seymour Cassel, Dan Hedaya, Carrie-Anne Moss, Jeremy Piven, Jennifer Tilly, Lainie Kazan, Miguel Sandoval, Casey Siemaszko, Matt Borlenghi, Jeremy Ratchford, Billy Jayne, Mike Moroff, José Zúñiga, Carlos Gomez, Louis Guss, Joe Rigano, Ron Karabatsos, Frank Vincent, Marc Macaulay, Cullen Douglas, Jim R. Coleman, Louis Lombardi, Lorri Bagley, Antoni Corone, Fyvush Finkel, Christa Campbell, Allan F. Nicholls, Harry Boykoff, Tamela D'Amico, Oscar Isaac, Thomas Rosales Jr.	
A U G U S T	26	The Last of the Blonde Bombshells	HBO Films	Gillies MacKinnon (director); Alan Plater (screenplay); Judi Dench, Ian Holm, Olympia Dukakis, Leslie Caron, Cleo Laine, Joan Sims, Billie Whitelaw, June Whitfield, Felicity Dean, Valentine Pelka, John Warnaby, James Cosmo, Romola Garai, Kate Maberly, Clemency Burton-Hill, Peter Youngblood Hills, Kathryn Pogson, Carolyn Bannister, Millie Findlay, Nicholas Palliser, Dom Chapman	
A U G U S T	29	Alvin and the Chipmunks Meet the Wolfman	Universal Studios Home Video / Universal Cartoon Studios / Bagdasarian Productions / Tama Productions	Kathi Castillo (director); John Loy (screenplay); Ross Bagdasarian, Jr., Janice Karman, Maurice LaMarche, Miriam Flynn, Rob Paulsen, April Winchell, E.G. Daily, Frank Welker, Dody Goodman, Debbie Rothstein	
S E P T E M B E R	1	Highlander: Endgame	Dimension Films	Douglas Aarniokoski (director); Joel Soisson (screenplay); Adrian Paul, Christopher Lambert, Bruce Payne, Lisa Barbuscia, Donnie Yen, Peter Wingfield, Jim Byrnes, Damon Dash, Beatie Edney, Sheila Gish, Oris Erhuero, Ian Paul Cassidy, Adam Copeland, June Watson, Donald Douglas, Doug Aarniokoski	
S E P T E M B E R	1	Whipped	Destination Films	Peter M. Cohen (director/screenplay); Amanda Peet, Brian Van Holt, Beth Ostrosky, Judah Domke, Zorie Barber, Jonathan Abrahams, Callie Thorne, Bridget Moynahan	
S E P T E M B E R	6	Backstage	Dimension Films	Chris Fiore (director); James Hunter, Michael Raffanello (screenplay); Jay-Z, DMX, Method Man, Redman, Beanie Sigel, Ja Rule, Memphis Bleek, DJ Clue?, Amil, Damon Dash, DJ Scratch, Eve, Swizz Beatz, Chuck D, Busta Rhymes, Sean "Puffy" Combs, Mathematics, Ed Lover, Russell Simmons, Kevin Liles, Lyor Cohen, Jeremy Dash, Pain in da Ass, DJ Twinz	
S E P T E M B E R	6	Turn It Up	New Line Cinema	Robert Adetuyi (director); Ray Daniels, Chris Hudson, Kelly Hilaire (screenplay); Ja Rule, Pras, Faith Evans, Jason Statham, Tamala Jones, Vondie Curtis-Hall, John Ralston, Chris Messina, Eugene Clark, Chang Tseng	
S E P T E M B E R	8	Anatomy	Columbia Pictures	Stefan Ruzowitzky (director/screenplay); Franka Potente, Benno Fürmann, Anna Loos, Holger Speckhahn, Sebastian Blomberg	
S E P T E M B E R	8	Nurse Betty	USA Films	Neil LaBute (director); John C. Richards, James Flamberg (screenplay); Morgan Freeman, Renée Zellweger, Chris Rock, Greg Kinnear, Aaron Eckhart, Pruitt Taylor Vince, Tia Texada, Allison Janney, Harriet Sansom Harris, Crispin Glover, Elizabeth Mitchell, Kathleen Wilhoite, Sheila Kelley, Sung-Hi Lee, Steven Gilborn, Christopher McDonald, Laird Macintosh, Jenny Gago, Matthew Cowles, Wayne Tippit, George D. Wallace, Lesley Woods, Alfonso Freeman, Kevin Rahm, Steven Culp, Deborah May, Steve Franken, Stacy Haiduk, Jenny Wade	
S E P T E M B E R	8	Urbania	Lions Gate Films	Jon Shear (director/screenplay); Philippe Denham (director); Daniel Reitz (screenplay); Dan Futterman, Paige Turco, Samuel Ball, Josh Hamilton, Matt Keeslar, Alan Cumming, Lothaire Bluteau, James Simon, Megan Dodds, Gabriel Olds, Barbara Sukowa, Gerry Bamman, Pamela Shaw, Christopher Bradley, Marylouise Burke, Paul Dawson, Brian Keane, Bill Sage	
S E P T E M B E R	8	The Watcher	Universal Pictures / Interlight	Joe Charbanic (director); Darcy Meyers, David Elliot (screenplay); James Spader, Keanu Reeves, Marisa Tomei, Ernie Hudson, Chris Ellis, Robert Cicchini, Yvonne Niami, Rebekah Louise Smith	
S E P T E M B E R	8	The Way of the Gun	Artisan Entertainment	Christopher McQuarrie (director/screenplay); Benicio del Toro, Ryan Phillippe, James Caan, Juliette Lewis, Taye Diggs, Nicky Katt, Geoffrey Lewis, Dylan Kussman, Scott Wilson, Kristin Lehman, Sarah Silverman	
S E P T E M B E R	12	Tweety's High-Flying Adventure	Warner Home Video / Warner Bros. Animation	Karl Torege, Charles Visser, James T. Walker, Kyung Won Lim (directors); Tom Minton, Tim Cahill, Julie McNally-Cahill (screenplay); Joe Alaskey, Jeff Bennett, Jim Cummings, June Foray, Stan Freberg, T'Keyah Crystal Keymáh, Tress MacNeille, Rob Paulsen, Frank Welker, Kath Soucie	
S E P T E M B E R	15	Almost Famous	DreamWorks / Columbia Pictures / Vinyl Films	Cameron Crowe (director/screenplay); Patrick Fugit, Billy Crudup, Kate Hudson, Frances McDormand, Jason Lee, Philip Seymour Hoffman, Fairuza Balk, Anna Paquin, Noah Taylor, Zooey Deschanel, Bijou Phillips, Terry Chen, Jay Baruchel, Jimmy Fallon, Rainn Wilson, Mark Kozelek, Liz Stauber, Zack Ward, John Fedevich, Eric Stonestreet, Marc Maron, Peter Frampton, Mitch Hedberg, Michael Angarano	
S E P T E M B E R	15	Bait	Warner Bros. Pictures / Castle Rock Entertainment	Antoine Fuqua (director); Andrew Scheinman, Adam Scheinman, Tony Gilroy (screenplay); Jamie Foxx, David Morse, Doug Hutchison, Kimberly Elise, David Paymer, Mike Epps, Robert Pastorelli, Jamie Kennedy, Nestor Serrano, Kirk Acevedo, Jeffrey Donovan, Megan Dodds, Tia Texada, Neil Crone	
S E P T E M B E R	15	Circus	Columbia Pictures / Circus Pictures / Film Development Corporation	Rob Walker (director); David Logan (screenplay); John Hannah, Famke Janssen, Peter Stormare, Brian Conley, Fred Ward, Eddie Izzard	
S E P T E M B E R	15	Crime and Punishment in Suburbia	United Artists	Rob Schmidt (director); Larry Gross (screenplay); Monica Keena, Ellen Barkin, Michael Ironside, Vincent Kartheiser, James DeBello, Jeffrey Wright, Conchata Ferrell, Marshall Teague, Nicki Aycox, Bonnie Somerville, Lucinda Jenney, Blake Shields, Tommy Bush, Brad Greenquist	
S E P T E M B E R	15	Duets	Hollywood Pictures / Beacon Pictures	Bruce Paltrow (director); John Byrum (screenplay); Gwyneth Paltrow, Huey Lewis, Paul Giamatti, Maria Bello, Andre Braugher, Scott Speedman, Lochlyn Munro, John Pinette, Angie Dickinson, Maya Rudolph, Keegan Connor Tracy, Kiersten Warren, Marian Seldes, Aaron Pearl, Steve Oatway	
S E P T E M B E R	15	Into the Arms of Strangers: Stories of the Kindertransport	Warner Bros. Pictures	Mark Jonathan Harris (director/screenwriter); Judi Dench	
S E P T E M B E R	19	The Little Mermaid II: Return to the Sea	Walt Disney Home Video	Jim Kammerud, Brian Smith (directors); Elizabeth Anderson, Temple Mathews, Elise D'Haene, Eddie Guzelian (screenplay); Jodi Benson, Samuel E. Wright, Pat Carroll, Rob Paulsen, Kenneth Mars, Tara Strong, Cam Clarke, Buddy Hackett, Clancy Brown, Max Casella, Stephen Furst, René Auberjonois, Edie McClurg, Kay E. Kuter, Frank Welker, Blake McIver Ewing, Emily Hart, Marcus Toji, Tress MacNeille, Justin Schulte	
S E P T E M B E R	22	The Exorcist: The Version You've Never Seen	Warner Bros. Pictures	William Friedkin (director); William Peter Blatty (screenplay); Ellen Burstyn, Max von Sydow, Lee J. Cobb, Kitty Winn, Jack MacGowran, Jason Miller, Linda Blair, Father William O'Malley, Father Thomas Bermingham, Peter Masterson, Robert Symonds, Barton Heyman, Rudolf Schündler, Arthur Storch, Titos Vandis, William Peter Blatty, Mercedes McCambridge, Eileen Dietz, Vasiliki Maliaros, Dick Callinan, Gina Petrushka	
S E P T E M B E R	22	The Fantasticks	United Artists	Michael Ritchie (director); Tom Jones, Harvey Schmidt (screenplay); Joel Grey, Barnard Hughes, Jean Louisa Kelly, Joey McIntyre, Jonathon Morris, Brad Sullivan, Teller, Arturo Gil, Tony Cox	
S E P T E M B E R	22	The Specials	Fluid Entertainment / Regent Entertainment / Brillstein-Grey Entertainment / Mindfire Entertainment	Craig Mazin (director); James Gunn (screenplay); Thomas Haden Church, Rob Lowe, Jamie Kennedy, Judy Greer, Sean Gunn, Paget Brewster, Jordan Ladd, Jim Zulevic, Kelly Coffield Park, James Gunn, Barry Del Sherman, Mike Schwartz, Taryn Manning, Jenna Fischer, Melissa Joan Hart, Michael Weatherly, John Doe, Brian Gunn, Lauren Cohn, Chuti Tiu, Abdul Salaam El Razzac, Tom Dorfmeister, Johann Stauf, Samantha Cannon, Judith Drake	
S E P T E M B E R	22	Under Suspicion	Lions Gate / Revelations Entertainment / TF1 International	Stephen Hopkins (director); Tom Provost, W. Peter Iliff (screenplay); Gene Hackman, Morgan Freeman, Thomas Jane, Monica Bellucci, Nydia Caro, Miguel Ángel Suárez, Luis Caballero, Marisol Calero, Mike Gomez, Luisa Leschin, Vanessa Marquez, Norma Maldonado, Al Rodrigo, Marcelo Tubert, Pablo Cunqueiro, Isabel Algaze, Jacqueline Duprey, Patricia Beato, Soledad Esponda, Hector Travieso, Vanessa Shenk, Noel Oscar Alicea Colon	
S E P T E M B E R	22	Urban Legends: Final Cut	Columbia Pictures / Phoenix Pictures	John Ottman (director); Paul Harris Boardman, Scott Derrickson (screenplay); Jennifer Morrison, Matthew Davis, Hart Bochner, Eva Mendes, Anthony Anderson, Loretta Devine, Joey Lawrence, Jessica Cauffiel, Anson Mount, Michael Bacall, Marco Hofschneider, Derek Aasland, Jacinda Barrett, Peter Millard, Chas Lawther, Chuck Campbell, Yani Gellman, Jeannette Sousa, Rory Feore, Rebecca Gayheart	
S E P T E M B E R	22	Woman on Top	Fox Searchlight Pictures	Fina Torres (director); Vera Blasi (screenplay); Penélope Cruz, Murilo Benício, Harold Perrineau, Mark Feuerstein, John de Lancie, Wagner Moura, Ana Gasteyer, Anne Ramsay, Eliana Guttman, Eduardo Mattedi	
S E P T E M B E R	27	Best in Show	Warner Bros. Pictures / Castle Rock Entertainment	Christopher Guest (director/screenplay); Eugene Levy (screenplay); Christopher Guest, Eugene Levy, Catherine O'Hara, John Michael Higgins, Michael McKean, Michael Hitchcock, Parker Posey, Jennifer Coolidge, Jane Lynch, Larry Miller, Jim Piddock, Fred Willard, Ed Begley Jr., Lynda Boyd, Teryl Rothery, Patrick Crenshaw, Will Sasso, Bob Balaban, Don Lake, Jay Brazeau, Linda Kash, Tony Alcantar, Camille Sullivan, Hiro Kanagawa, Don S. Davis, Rachael Harris, Deborah Theaker, Lewis Arquette, Colin Cunningham, Fulvio Cecere, Carmen Aguirre, Malcolm Stewart	
S E P T E M B E R	29	Beautiful	Destination Films	Sally Field (director); Jon Bernstein (screenplay); Minnie Driver, Joey Lauren Adams, Hallie Kate Eisenberg, Kathleen Turner, Leslie Stefanson, Bridgette Wilson, Kathleen Robertson, Michael McKean, Gary Collins, Linda Hart, Chuti Tiu, Ali Landry, Jessica Collins, Julie Condra, Herta Ware, Colleen Rennison, Jacqueline Steiger	
S E P T E M B E R	29	The Broken Hearts Club	Sony Pictures Classics	Greg Berlanti (director/screenplay); Ben Weber, Timothy Olyphant, Matt McGrath, Zach Braff, Dean Cain, Andrew Keegan, Billy Porter, John Mahoney, Jennifer Coolidge, Nia Long, Mary McCormack, Justin Theroux, Kerr Smith	
S E P T E M B E R	29	Girlfight	Screen Gems	Karyn Kusama (director/screenplay); Michelle Rodriguez, Jaime Tirelli, Paul Calderon, Santiago Douglas, Ray Santiago, Victor Sierra, Elisa Bocanegra, Shannon Walker Williams, Louis Guss, Herb Lovelle	
S E P T E M B E R	29	Remember the Titans	Walt Disney Pictures / Jerry Bruckheimer Films	Boaz Yakin (director); Gregory Allen Howard (screenplay); Denzel Washington, Will Patton, Donald Faison, Nicole Ari Parker, Hayden Panettiere, Wood Harris, Ryan Hurst, Craig Kirkwood, Ethan Suplee, Ryan Gosling, Burgess Jenkins, Kip Pardue, Kate Bosworth, Earl C. Poitier, Neal Ghant	

== October–December ==
Opening		Title	Production company	Cast and crew	Ref.
O C T O B E R	3	Scooby-Doo and the Alien Invaders	Warner Home Video	Jim Stenstrum (director); Davis Doi, Lance Falk (screenplay); Scott Innes, Mary Kay Bergman, Frank Welker, B.J. Ward, Jeff Bennett, Jennifer Hale, Mark Hamill, Candi Milo, Kevin Michael Richardson, Neil Ross, Audrey Wasilewski	
O C T O B E R	6	Bamboozled	New Line Cinema / 40 Acres and a Mule Filmworks	Spike Lee (director/screenplay); Damon Wayans, Savion Glover, Jada Pinkett Smith, Tommy Davidson, Michael Rapaport, Mos Def, Thomas Jefferson Byrd, Paul Mooney, Sarah Jones, Susan Batson, Yaslin Bey, Canibus, DJ Scratch, Charli Baltimore, Craig muMs Grant, MC Serch, The Roots, Jason Bernard, Imhotep Gary Byrd, Johnnie L. Cochran Jr., Al Sharpton, Matthew Modine, Mira Sorvino, Liza Jessie Peterson, David Wain, Mildred Clinton, Coati Mundi, Caridad 'La Bruja' de la Luz, Julie Dretzin, Steven McElroy, Stephen Kunken, A.D. Miles, Kim Director, Kiki Haynes, Chyna, Danny Hoch, Marcia Clark, Bill Clinton, Tracy Morgan, Chris Rock, George Siegmann, O. J. Simpson	
O C T O B E R	6	Bootmen	Fox Searchlight Pictures	Dein Perry (director/screenplay); Steve Worland, Hilary Linstead (screenplay); Adam Garcia, Sophie Lee, Sam Worthington, Richard Carter, Andrew Kaluski, Christopher Horsey, Lee McDonald, Matt Lee, William Zappa, Susie Porter, Anthony Hayes, Justine Clarke, Grant Walmsley, Andrew Doyle, Bruce Venables	
O C T O B E R	6	Dancer in the Dark	Fine Line Features	Lars von Trier (director/screenplay); Björk, Catherine Deneuve, David Morse, Peter Stormare, Joel Grey, Jean-Marc Barr, Cara Seymour, Siobhan Fallon, Vincent Paterson, Zeljko Ivanek, Udo Kier, Stellan Skarsgård	
O C T O B E R	6	Digimon: The Movie	20th Century Fox / Fox Kids	Mamoru Hosoda, Shigeyasu Yamauchi (director); Jeff Nimoy, Bob Buchholz (screenplay); Joshua Seth, Lara Jill Miller, Michael Lindsay, Mona Marshall, Doug Erholtz, Bob Glouberman, Paul St. Peter, Michael Reisz, Colleen O'Shaughnessey, Philece Sampler, Wendee Lee, Tom Fahn, Joseph Pilato, Lex Lang, Kirk Thornton, Tifanie Christun, Jeff Nimoy, R. Martin Klein, Dave Mallow, Edie Mirman, Brian Donovan, Derek Stephen Prince, Steve Blum, Neil Kaplan, Robert Axelrod, Michael Sorich, Bob Papenbrook, Brianne Siddall, David Lodge, Mike Reynolds, Anna Garduno, Laura Summer, Peggy O'Neal	
O C T O B E R	6	Get Carter	Warner Bros. Pictures / Morgan Creek Productions / Franchise Pictures / The Canton Company	Stephen Kay (director); David McKenna (screenplay); Sylvester Stallone, Miranda Richardson, Rachael Leigh Cook, Alan Cumming, Mickey Rourke, John C. McGinley, Michael Caine, Rhona Mitra, Johnny Strong, John Cassini, Mark Boone Junior, Gretchen Mol, Tom Sizemore, Crystal Lowe	
O C T O B E R	6	Meet the Parents	Universal Pictures / DreamWorks	Jay Roach (director); Jim Herzfeld, John Hamburg (screenplay); Robert De Niro, Ben Stiller, Teri Polo, Blythe Danner, Owen Wilson, Jon Abrahams, James Rebhorn, Nicole DeHuff, Tom McCarthy, Phyllis George, Kali Rocha, Bernie Sheredy, Judah Friedlander, Peter Bartlett, William Severs, John Fiore, Russell Hornsby, Cody Arens, Cole Hawkins, Spencer Breslin	
O C T O B E R	6	Requiem for a Dream	Artisan Entertainment	Darren Aronofsky (director/screenplay); Hubert Selby Jr. (screenplay); Ellen Burstyn, Jared Leto, Jennifer Connelly, Marlon Wayans, Christopher McDonald, Mark Margolis, Louise Lasser, Marcia Jean Kurtz, Sean Gullette, Keith David, Dylan Baker, Ajay Naidu, Ben Shenkman, Hubert Selby Jr., Darren Aronofsky	
O C T O B E R	6	Tigerland	20th Century Fox / Regency Enterprises	Joel Schumacher (director); Ross Klavan, Michael McGruther (screenplay); Colin Farrell, Matthew Davis, Shea Whigham, Clifton Collins Jr., Cole Hauser, Tom Guiry, Neil Brown Jr., Tory Kittles, Nick Searcy, Afemo Omilami, Matt Gerald, Michael Shannon, James Macdonald, Arian Ash	
O C T O B E R	13	Animal Factory	Silver Nitrate / Franchise Pictures	Steve Buscemi (director); Edward Bunker, John Steppling (screenplay); Willem Dafoe, Edward Furlong, Danny Trejo, John Heard, Mickey Rourke, Tom Arnold, Seymour Cassel, Mark Boone Junior, Edward Bunker, Jake LaBotz, Chris Bauer, Mark Webber, Steve Buscemi, Anohni, Shell Galloway, Michael Buscemi	
O C T O B E R	13	The Contender	DreamWorks	Rod Lurie (director/screenplay); Gary Oldman, Joan Allen, Jeff Bridges, Christian Slater, Sam Elliott, William L. Petersen, Saul Rubinek, Philip Baker Hall, Mike Binder, Robin Thomas, Mariel Hemingway, Kathryn Morris, Douglas Urbanski, Angelica Page, Kevin Geer, Anthony Booth, Sean Pratt, Larry King, Louis Ferreira	
O C T O B E R	13	Dr. T & the Women	Artisan Entertainment	Robert Altman (director); Anne Rapp (screenplay); Richard Gere, Helen Hunt, Farrah Fawcett, Laura Dern, Shelley Long, Kate Hudson, Liv Tyler, Tara Reid, Robert Hays, Matt Malloy, Andy Richter, Lee Grant, Janine Turner, Sarah Shahi	
O C T O B E R	13	The Ladies Man	Paramount Pictures / SNL Studios	Reginald Hudlin (director); Tim Meadows, Dennis McNicholas, Andrew Steele (screenplay); Tim Meadows, Karyn Parsons, Billy Dee Williams, Tiffani Thiessen, Lee Evans, Will Ferrell, Sofia Milos, Jill Talley, John Witherspoon, Ken Hudson Campbell, Rocky Carroll, Tamala Jones, Kevin McDonald, Julianne Moore, Eugene Levy, David Huband, Arnold Pinnock, Shaun Majumder, Sean Thibodeau, Mark McKinney, Chris Parnell, Susan Aceron, Boyd Banks, Reginald Hudlin	
O C T O B E R	13	Lost Souls	New Line Cinema	Janusz Kamiński (director); Pierce Gardner (screenplay); Winona Ryder, Ben Chaplin, Sarah Wynter, Philip Baker Hall, John Hurt, W. Earl Brown, Elias Koteas, Brian Reddy, John Beasley, John Diehl, Brad Greenquist, Anna Gunn	
O C T O B E R	20	Bedazzled	20th Century Fox / Regency Enterprises	Harold Ramis (director/screenplay); Larry Gelbart, Peter Tolan (screenplay); Brendan Fraser, Elizabeth Hurley, Frances O'Connor, Orlando Jones, Paul Adelstein, Toby Huss, Miriam Shor, Gabriel Casseus, Brian Doyle-Murray, Jeff Doucette, Aaron Lustig, Rudolf Martin, Julian Firth, Iain Rogerson, Biddy Hodson, Roger Hammond, Bonnie Somerville, William Salyers, Tom Woodruff Jr., Joanna Bacalso, Lex Lang, Scott Trimble	
O C T O B E R	20	Cherry Falls	USA Films	Geoffrey Wright (director); Ken Selden (screenplay); Brittany Murphy, Jay Mohr, Michael Biehn, Gabriel Mann, Jesse Bradford, DJ Qualls, Kristen Miller, Candy Clark, Natalie Ramsey, Douglas Spain, Bre Blair, Michael Weston, Keram Malicki-Sanchez, Clementine Ford, Colin Fickes, Zachary Knighton, Amanda Anka, Joe Inscoe, Vicki Davis, Rick Forrester	
O C T O B E R	20	MVP: Most Valuable Primate	Keystone Releasing	Robert Vince (director/screenplay); Anne Vince (screenplay); Kevin Zegers, Jamie Renée Smith, Oliver Muirhead, Rick Ducommun, Russell Ferrier, Lomax Study, Alexa Fox, Jane Sowerby, Ingrid Tesch, Philip Granger	
O C T O B E R	20	Pay It Forward	Warner Bros. Pictures / Bel-Air Entertainment	Mimi Leder (director); Leslie Dixon (screenplay); Kevin Spacey, Helen Hunt, Haley Joel Osment, Jay Mohr, Jim Caviezel, Jon Bon Jovi, Angie Dickinson, David Ramsey, Colleen Flynn, Marc Donato, Kathleen Wilhoite, Liza Snyder, Jeannetta Arnette, Hannah Leder, Tina Lifford, Shawn Pyfrom, Bradley White, Molly Bernard, Bernard White, Leslie Dilley	
O C T O B E R	20	The Yards	Miramax Films	James Gray (director/screenplay); Matt Reeves (screenplay); Mark Wahlberg, Joaquin Phoenix, Charlize Theron, Faye Dunaway, Ellen Burstyn, James Caan, Steve Lawrence, Tony Musante, Victor Argo, Tomas Milian, Robert Montano, Victor Arnold, Louis Guss, Domenick Lombardozzi, Joe Lisi, David Zayas, John Tormey, Dan Grimaldi, Garry Pastore, Keith Hernandez, Allan Houston, Maximiliano Hernández, Ernie Anastos	
O C T O B E R	27	Book of Shadows: Blair Witch 2	Artisan Entertainment	Joe Berlinger (director); Dick Beebe, Joe Berlinger, Daniel Myrick, Eduardo Sánchez (screenplay); Kim Director, Jeffrey Donovan, Erica Leerhsen, Tristine Skyler, Stephen Barker Turner, Lanny Flaherty, Lauren Hulsey, Raynor Scheine, Kennen Sisco, Kevin Murray	
O C T O B E R	27	The Little Vampire	New Line Cinema	Uli Edel (director); Karey Kirkpatrick, Larry Wilson (screenplay); Jonathan Lipnicki, Richard E. Grant, Jim Carter, Alice Krige, Pamela Gidley, Tommy Hinkley, Anna Popplewell, Dean Cook, Rollo Weeks, John Wood, Ed Stoppard, Jake D'Arcy, Iain De Caestecker, Scott Fletcher, Johnny Meres, Georgie Glen, Elizabeth Berrington	
O C T O B E R	27	Loving Jezebel	Universal Focus / BET / Lancaster Productions / Starz! Encore Entertainment	Kwyn Bader (director/screenplay); Hill Harper, David Moscow, Laurel Holloman, Nicole Ari Parker, Sandrine Holt, Lysa Aya Trenier, Lawrence Gilliard Jr., John Doman, Phylicia Rashad, Elisa Donovan, Jan Tríska, Andre B. Blake, Jean-Christophe Emo, Justin Pierre Edmund, Heather Gottlieb, Diandra Newlin, Faith Geer, Barry Yourgrau, Angel Brown, Ray Frazier, Crystal Rose, Johnny X Rook	
O C T O B E R	27	Lucky Numbers	Paramount Pictures / StudioCanal	Nora Ephron (director); Adam Resnick (screenplay); John Travolta, Lisa Kudrow, Tim Roth, Ed O'Neill, Bill Pullman, Michael Rapaport, Michael Moore, Daryl Mitchell, Richard Schiff, Caroline Aaron, Sam McMurray, Michael Weston, Maria Bamford, John F. O'Donohue, Colin Mochrie, Nick Loren, Jake Fritz, Emmy Laybourne, Ken Jenkins	
O C T O B E R	31	Batman Beyond: Return of the Joker	Warner Home Video	Curt Geda (director); Paul Dini (screenplay); Will Friedle, Kevin Conroy, Mark Hamill, Angie Harmon, Dean Stockwell, Teri Garr, Arleen Sorkin, Tara Strong, Mathew Valencia, Melissa Joan Hart, Michael Rosenbaum, Don Harvey, Henry Rollins, Frank Welker, Rachael Leigh Cook, Ryan O'Donohue, Lauren Tom, Vernee Watson-Johnson, Mark Jonathan Davis, Mary Scheer, Jason Stanford, Andrea Romano, Bruce Timm	
O C T O B E R	31	Mercy Streets	Signal Hill Production	John Gunn (director/screenplay); John Mann (screenplay); Eric Roberts, David A. R. White, Cynthia Watros, Stacy Keach	
N O V E M B E R	3	Charlie's Angels	Columbia Pictures	McG (director); Ryan Rowe, Ed Solomon, John August (screenplay); Cameron Diaz, Drew Barrymore, Lucy Liu, Bill Murray, Sam Rockwell, Kelly Lynch, Crispin Glover, Tim Curry, John Forsythe, Tom Green, Matt LeBlanc, Luke Wilson, LL Cool J, Sean Whalen, Melissa McCarthy, Karen McDougal, Alex Trebek, Mark Ryan, Bobby Ore, Guy Oseary, Reggie Hayes, Bob Stephenson, Ned Bellamy, Andrew Wilson, Frank Marocco, Kevin Grevioux, Michael Papajohn, Isaac C. Singleton Jr., Mike Smith, Jerry Trimble	
N O V E M B E R	3	The Legend of Bagger Vance	DreamWorks / 20th Century Fox / Allied Filmmakers	Robert Redford (director); Jeremy Leven (screenplay); Will Smith, Matt Damon, Charlize Theron, Bruce McGill, Jack Lemmon, Joel Gretsch, J. Michael Moncrief, Lane Smith, Peter Gerety, Michael O'Neill, Thomas Jay Ryan, Dermot Crowley, Harve Presnell, Michael McCarty, Carrie Preston, J. Don Ferguson, E. Roger Mitchell, Bernard Hocke	
N O V E M B E R	5	The Growing Pains Movie	Walt Disney Television	Alan Metter (director); David Kendall, Michael Sullivan (screenplay); Alan Thicke, Joanna Kerns, Kirk Cameron, Tracey Gold, Jeremy Miller, Ashley Johnson	
N O V E M B E R	7	Joseph: King of Dreams	DreamWorks	Robert Ramirez, Rob LaDuca (directors); Eugenia Bostwick-Singer, Raymond Singer, Joe Stillman, Marshall Goldberg (screenplay); Ben Affleck, Mark Hamill, Richard Herd, Maureen McGovern, Jodi Benson, Judith Light, James Eckhouse, Richard McGonagle, David Campbell, Steven Weber, Dan Castellaneta, René Auberjonois, Ken Hudson Campbell, Tom Virtue, Jeff Bennett, Jess Harnell, Matt Levin	
N O V E M B E R	10	Little Nicky	New Line Cinema	Steven Brill (director/screenplay); Adam Sandler, Tim Herlihy (screenplay); Adam Sandler, Patricia Arquette, Harvey Keitel, Rhys Ifans, Reese Witherspoon, Tommy "Tiny" Lister Jr., Robert Smigel, Allen Covert, Rodney Dangerfield, Jonathan Loughran, Peter Dante, Blake Clark, Kevin Nealon, Dana Carvey, Michael McKean, Laura Harring, Jess Harnell, Regis Philbin, Ozzy Osbourne, Bill Walton, Dan Marino, Henry Winkler, George Wallace, Radio Man, Rob Schneider, Carl Weathers, Jon Lovitz, Quentin Tarantino, Clint Howard, John Witherspoon	
N O V E M B E R	10	Men of Honor	20th Century Fox	George Tillman Jr. (director); Scott Marshall Smith (screenplay); Robert De Niro, Cuba Gooding Jr., Charlize Theron, Aunjanue Ellis, Hal Holbrook, Michael Rapaport, Powers Boothe, David Keith, Holt McCallany, David Conrad, Joshua Leonard, Carl Lumbly, Lonette McKee, Glynn Turman, Joshua Feinman, Chris Warren Jr.	
N O V E M B E R	10	Red Planet	Warner Bros. Pictures / Village Roadshow Pictures	Antony Hoffman (director); Chuck Pfarrer, Jonathan Lemkin (screenplay); Val Kilmer, Carrie-Anne Moss, Tom Sizemore, Benjamin Bratt, Simon Baker, Terence Stamp, Neil Ross	
N O V E M B E R	12	The Miracle Worker	Walt Disney Television	Nadia Tass (director); William Gibson, Monte Merrick (screenplay); Hallie Kate Eisenberg, Alison Elliott, David Strathairn, Lucas Black, Kevin Duhaney, Patricia Gage, Eugene Lipinski, Jackie Richardson, Kate Greenhouse, Damir Andrei, Neville Edwards, Twila Provencher, Liam Robinson, Stephanie Sams	
N O V E M B E R	17	The 6th Day	Columbia Pictures / Phoenix Pictures	Roger Spottiswoode (director); Cormac Wibberley, Marianne Wibberley (screenplay); Arnold Schwarzenegger, Tony Goldwyn, Michael Rapaport, Michael Rooker, Sarah Wynter, Robert Duvall, Wendy Crewson, Rodney Rowland, Terry Crews, Ken Pogue, Colin Cunningham, Wanda Cannon, Taylor Anne Reid, Jennifer Gareis, Andrea Libman	
N O V E M B E R	17	Bounce	Miramax Films	Don Roos (director/screenplay); Ben Affleck, Gwyneth Paltrow, Tony Goldwyn, Natasha Henstridge, Edward Edwards, Jennifer Grey, Lisa Joyner, Caroline Aaron, Alex D. Linz, David Dorfman, Juan Garcia, Joe Morton, Johnny Galecki, David St. James	
N O V E M B E R	17	How the Grinch Stole Christmas	Universal Pictures / Imagine Entertainment	Ron Howard (director); Jeffrey Price and Peter S. Seaman (screenplay); Jim Carrey, Taylor Momsen, Jeffrey Tambor, Christine Baranski, Bill Irwin, Molly Shannon, Clint Howard, Mindy Sterling, Jeremy Howard, T. J. Thyne, Jim Meskimen, Mary Stein, Deep Roy, Rance Howard, Verne Troyer, Bryce Dallas Howard, Josh Ryan Evans, Ron Howard, Frank Welker, Anthony Hopkins, Rachel Winfree, Ben Bookbinder, Landry Allbright, Reid Kirchenbauer	
N O V E M B E R	17	Rugrats in Paris: The Movie	Paramount Pictures / Nickelodeon Movies / Klasky Csupo	Paul Demeyer (director); Jill Gorey, Barbara Herdon, Kate Boutilier, J. David Stem, David N. Weiss (screenplay); E.G. Daily, Tara Strong, Kath Soucie, Christine Cavanaugh, Cheryl Chase, Cree Summer Francks, Dionne Quan, Joe Alaskey, Debbie Reynolds, Michael Bell, Jack Riley, Melanie Chartoff, Tress MacNeille, Julia Kato, Phil Proctor, Susan Sarandon, John Lithgow, Mako, Tim Curry, Kevin Michael Richardson, Billy West, Charlie Adler, Dan Castellaneta, Lisa McClowry, Casey Kasem, Roger Rose, Margaret Smith, Shannon Stephens, Marlene Mitsuko Yamane, Darrell Kunitomi, Goh Misawa, Phillip Simon, Paul Demeyer, Richard Michel, Philippe Benichou, Braden Wright, Charles Fathy, Hannah Makragelidis, Ben Sunderland	
N O V E M B E R	18	For Love or Country: The Arturo Sandoval Story	HBO Films	Joseph Sargent (director); Timothy J. Sexton (screenplay); Andy García, Mía Maestro, Gloria Estefan, David Paymer, Charles S. Dutton, Tomas Milian, Freddy Rodriguez, José Zúñiga, Fernanda Andrade, Steven Bauer, Fionnula Flanagan, Miguel Sandoval, Robert Ray Wisdom, Victor Trujillo, Miriam Colón, Mario Ernesto Sánchez, Julio Oscar Mechoso, Joe Lala, Arturo Sandoval, Cachao	
N O V E M B E R	19	Santa Who?	Walt Disney Television	William Dear (director); Debra Frank, Steve L. Hayes (screenplay); Leslie Nielsen	
N O V E M B E R	22	102 Dalmatians	Walt Disney Pictures	Kevin Lima (director); Kristen Buckley, Brian Regan, Bob Tzudiker, Noni White (screenplay); Glenn Close, Gérard Depardieu, Ioan Gruffudd, Alice Evans, Tim McInnerny, Eric Idle, Ben Crompton, Carol MacReady, Ian Richardson, Jim Carter, Ron Cook, David Horovitch, Timothy West, Mike Hayley, Kerry Shale, Hugh Futcher, Jack Angel, Bill Farmer, Patrick Pinney, Phil Proctor	
N O V E M B E R	22	Quills	Fox Searchlight Pictures	Philip Kaufman (director); Doug Wright (screenplay); Geoffrey Rush, Kate Winslet, Joaquin Phoenix, Michael Caine, Billie Whitelaw, Stephen Marcus, Amelia Warner, Stephen Moyer, Jane Menelaus, Ron Cook, Patrick Malahide, Elizabeth Berrington, Tony Pritchard, Michael Jenn, Edward Tudor-Pole	
N O V E M B E R	22	Unbreakable	Touchstone Pictures / Blinding Edge Pictures	M. Night Shyamalan (director/screenplay); Bruce Willis, Samuel L. Jackson, Robin Wright Penn, Spencer Treat Clark, Charlayne Woodard, Eamonn Walker, Leslie Stefanson, Laura Regan, Bostin Christopher, Elizabeth Lawrence, Chance Kelly, Michael Kelly, M. Night Shyamalan	
D E C E M B E R	1	Panic	Artisan Entertainment	Henry Bromell (director/screenplay); William H. Macy, John Ritter, Neve Campbell, Donald Sutherland, Tracey Ullman, Barbara Bain, David Dorfman, Tina Lifford, Bix Barnaba, Nicholle Tom, Andrea Baker, Miguel Sandoval	
D E C E M B E R	6	Snatch	Screen Gems	Guy Ritchie (director/screenplay); Benicio del Toro, Dennis Farina, Vinnie Jones, Brad Pitt, Rade Šerbedžija, Jason Statham, Stephen Graham, Alan Ford, Robbie Gee, Lennie James, Ade, Adam Fogerty, Mike Reid, Sorcha Cusack, Jason Flemyng, Goldie, Velibor Topic, Sam Douglas, Ewen Bremner, Andy Beckwith, Dave Legeno, William Beck	
D E C E M B E R	8	Crouching Tiger, Hidden Dragon	Columbia Pictures Film Production Asia / Good Machine International / Edko Films / Zoom Hunt Productions / China Film Co-Production Corp. / Asia Union Film & Entertainment	Ang Lee (director); Wang Hui-ling, James Schamus, Tsai Kuo-jung (screenplay); Chow Yun-fat, Michelle Yeoh, Zhang Ziyi, Chang Chen	
D E C E M B E R	8	Dungeons & Dragons	New Line Cinema	Courtney Solomon (director); Carroll Cartwright, Topper Lilien (screenplay); Justin Whalin, Marlon Wayans, Jeremy Irons, Thora Birch, Bruce Payne, Zoe McLellan, Kristen Wilson, Edward Jewesbury, Lee Arenberg, Richard O'Brien, Tom Baker	
D E C E M B E R	8	Proof of Life	Warner Bros. Pictures / Castle Rock Entertainment / Bel-Air Entertainment	Taylor Hackford (director); Tony Gilroy (screenplay); Meg Ryan, Russell Crowe, David Morse, Pamela Reed, David Caruso, Anthony Heald, Michael Byrne, Stanley Anderson, Gottfried John, Alun Armstrong, Michael Kitchen, Margo Martindale, Mario Ernesto Sanchez, Pietro Sibille, Vicky Hernandez, Norma Martinez, Carlos Blanchard, Rowena King, Diego Trujillo	
D E C E M B E R	8	Vertical Limit	Columbia Pictures	Martin Campbell (director); Robert King, Terry Hayes (screenplay); Chris O'Donnell, Bill Paxton, Robin Tunney, Scott Glenn, Izabella Scorupco, Temuera Morrison, Stuart Wilson, Robert Taylor, Nicholas Lea, Alexander Siddig, David Hayman, Ben Mendelsohn, Steve Le Marquand, Roshan Seth, Ed Viesturs	
D E C E M B E R	9	Disappearing Acts	HBO Films	Gina Prince-Bythewood (director); Lisa Jones (screenplay); Wesley Snipes, Sanaa Lathan, Regina Hall, Lisa Arrindell Anderson, John Amos, Clark Johnson, Michael Imperioli, Kamaal 'Q-Tip' Fareed, CCH Pounder, Aunjanue Ellis, John Beasley, Laz Alonso, Peter Onorati, Chris Rock, Fernando Phifer Cameron, Dequan Henderson	
D E C E M B E R	10	Holiday Heart	Showtime Networks / MGM Television / Tribeca Productions	Robert Townsend (director); Cheryl L. West (screenplay); Ving Rhames, Alfre Woodard, Mykelti Williamson, Jesika Reynolds, Lorena Gale, Benz Antoine, Bob Dawson, Scott Swanson, Rhys Williams, Peter Williams, Johnathan Wesley Wallace, Philip Maurice Hayes, Blu Mankuma, James Kidnie, Gay Fauchon, Ron Selmour, Patricial Idlette, Mary Antonini, Emy Aneke, Actor, Steven Miller	
D E C E M B E R	12	Air Bud: World Pup	Buena Vista Home Entertainment	Bill Bannerman (director); Mike Whiting, Robert Vince, Anne Vince (screenplay); Kevin Zegers, Martin Ferrero, Dale Midkiff, Caitlin Wachs, Miguel Sandoval, Chantal Strand, Duncan Regehr, Alexander Ludwig, Don McMillan, Briana Scurry, Brandi Chastain, United States Women's National Soccer Team, Chilton Crane, Brittany Paige Bouck, Shayn Solberg	
D E C E M B E R	15	Chocolat	Miramax Films	Lasse Hallström (director); Robert Nelson Jacobs (screenplay); Juliette Binoche, Judi Dench, Alfred Molina, Lena Olin, Johnny Depp, Carrie-Anne Moss, Peter Stormare, Hugh O'Conor, Ron Cook, John Wood, Leslie Caron, Victoire Thivisol, Hélène Cardona, Antonio Gil, Elisabeth Commelin, Aurelien Parent-Koenig, Michele Gleizer, Dominique MacAvoy, Arnaud Adam, Christianne Oliveira, Tatyana Yassukovich	
D E C E M B E R	15	Dude, Where's My Car?	20th Century Fox / Alcon Entertainment	Danny Leiner (director); Philip Stark (screenplay); Ashton Kutcher, Seann William Scott, Jennifer Garner, Marla Sokoloff, Kristy Swanson, Charlie O'Connell, Hal Sparks, David Herman, Freda Foh Shen, John Toles-Bey, James Vincent, Keone Young, Erik Aude, Brent Spiner, Andy Dick, Jodi Ann Paterson	
D E C E M B E R	15	The Emperor's New Groove	Walt Disney Pictures	Mark Dindal (director); David Reynolds (screenplay); David Spade, John Goodman, Eartha Kitt, Patrick Warburton, Wendie Malick, Kellyann Kelso, Eli Russell Linnetz, Tom Jones, Jim Cummings, Corey Burton, Jack Angel, Bill Farmer, Phil Proctor, Eddie Korbich, Donald Fullilove, Richard Steven Horvitz, Paul Eiding, Philip L. Clarke, Brian Tochi, Patrick Pinney, Stephen Anderson, Bob Bergen, Rodger Bumpass, Robert Clotworthy, Jennifer Darling, Patti Deutsch, John Fiedler, Miriam Flynn, Jess Harnell, Sherry Lynn, Danny Mann, Mickie McGowan, Cathy Cavadini, Kath Soucie, Frank Welker, Andre Stojka, Steve Susskind, Joe Whyte, Mark Dindal, Daamen J. Krall, Geri Lee Gorowski, D.F. Reynolds, Jessica Rotter	
D E C E M B E R	15	Pollock	Sony Pictures Classics	Ed Harris (director); Barbara Turner, Susan Emshwiller (screenplay); Ed Harris, Marcia Gay Harden, Tom Bower, Jennifer Connelly, Bud Cort, John Heard, Val Kilmer, Robert Knott, David Leary, Amy Madigan, Sally Murphy, Molly Regan, Stephanie Seymour, Matthew Sussman, Jeffrey Tambor, Sada Thompson, Norbert Weisser, Everett Quinton, Annabelle Gurwitch, John Rothman, Kenny Scharf, Robert O'Neill	
D E C E M B E R	15	What Women Want	Paramount Pictures / Icon Productions	Nancy Meyers (director); Josh Goldsmith, Cathy Yuspa, Diane Drake (screenplay); Mel Gibson, Helen Hunt, Marisa Tomei, Lauren Holly, Mark Feuerstein, Alan Alda, Ashley Johnson, Judy Greer, Sarah Paulson, Robert Briscoe Evans, Delta Burke, Valerie Perrine, Eric Balfour, Ana Gasteyer, Diana-Maria Riva, Lisa Edelstein, Loretta Devine, Logan Lerman, Alex McKenna, Bette Midler, Andrea Baker, Alexondra Lee, Shirley Prestia, T.J. Thyne, Audrey Wasilewski, Brooke Elliott, LeShay Tomlinson, Cristine Rose, Arden Myrin, Juanita Jennings, Robin Pearson Rose, Hallie Meyers-Shyer, Richard Simmons, Martha Stewart	
D E C E M B E R	19	Finding Forrester	Columbia Pictures	Gus Van Sant (director); Mike Rich (screenplay); Sean Connery, Rob Brown, F. Murray Abraham, Anna Paquin, Busta Rhymes, April Grace, Michael Pitt, Michael Nouri, Matt Damon, Gerry Rosenthal, Glenn Fitzgerald	
D E C E M B E R	22	Cast Away	20th Century Fox / DreamWorks / ImageMovers	Robert Zemeckis (director); William Broyles Jr. (screenplay); Tom Hanks, Helen Hunt, Nick Searcy, Chris Noth, Jenifer Lewis, Lari White, Vince Martin, Geoffrey Blake, Michael Forest, Jay Acovone, Viveka Davis, Nan Martin, Dennis Letts, Valerie Wildman, Steve Monroe, Elden Henson, Timothy Stack, Joe Conley	
D E C E M B E R	22	Before Night Falls	Fine Line Features	Julian Schnabel (director/screenplay); Javier Bardem, Olivier Martinez, Johnny Depp, Hector Babenco, Andrea Di Stefano, Santiago Magill, John Ortiz, Manuel Gonzalez, Francisco Gattorno, Marisol Padilla Sanchez, Michael Wincott, Pedro Armendariz Jr., Sean Penn, Najwa Nimri, Diego Luna	
D E C E M B E R	22	Dracula 2000	Dimension Films	Patrick Lussier (director/screenplay); Joel Soisson (screenplay); Jonny Lee Miller, Justine Waddell, Gerard Butler, Colleen Ann Fitzpatrick, Jennifer Esposito, Danny Masterson, Jeri Ryan, Lochlyn Munro, Sean Patrick Thomas, Omar Epps, Christopher Plummer, Tony Munch, Shane West, Nathan Fillion, David J. Francis, Tom Kane	
D E C E M B E R	22	The Family Man	Universal Pictures / Beacon Pictures	Brett Ratner (director); David Diamond, David Weissman (screenplay); Nicolas Cage, Téa Leoni, Don Cheadle, Jeremy Piven, Saul Rubinek, Josef Sommer, Makenzie Vega, Lisa Thornhill, Harve Presnell, Mary Beth Hurt, Amber Valletta, Francine York, John F. O'Donohue, Ken Leung, Kate Walsh, Gianni Russo, Tom McGowan, Joel McKinnon Miller, Lisa LoCicero, Robert Downey Sr., Jake and Ryan Milkovich	
D E C E M B E R	22	The Gift	Paramount Classics / Lakeshore Entertainment	Sam Raimi (director); Billy Bob Thornton, Tom Epperson (screenplay); Cate Blanchett, Giovanni Ribisi, Keanu Reeves, Katie Holmes, Greg Kinnear, Hilary Swank, Michael Jeter, Kim Dickens, Gary Cole, Rosemary Harris, J.K. Simmons, Chelcie Ross, John Beasley, Stuart Greer, Danny Elfman	
D E C E M B E R	22	The House of Mirth	Sony Pictures Classics	Terence Davies (director/screenplay); Gillian Anderson, Dan Aykroyd, Terry Kinney, Anthony LaPaglia, Laura Linney, Elizabeth McGovern, Eric Stoltz, Eleanor Bron, Jodhi May, Penny Downie, Pearce Quigley, Lorelei King, Morag Siller, Pamela Dwyer	
D E C E M B E R	22	Miss Congeniality	Warner Bros. Pictures / Castle Rock Entertainment / Village Roadshow Pictures	Donald Petrie (director); Marc Lawrence, Katie Ford, Caryn Lucas (screenplay); Sandra Bullock, Michael Caine, Benjamin Bratt, William Shatner, Ernie Hudson, Candice Bergen, John DiResta, Heather Burns, Melissa De Sousa, Steve Monroe, Deirdre Quinn, Wendy Raquel Robinson, Cody Linley, Jennifer Gareis, Marco Perella, LeeAnne Locken	
D E C E M B E R	22	O Brother, Where Art Thou?	Touchstone Pictures / Working Title Films / Mike Zoss Productions	Joel Coen, Ethan Coen (directors/screenplay); George Clooney, John Turturro, Tim Blake Nelson, John Goodman, Holly Hunter, Chris Thomas King, Charles Durning, Michael Badalucco, Wayne Duvall, Ed Gale, Ray McKinnon, Daniel von Bargen, Royce D. Applegate, Frank Collison, Lee Weaver, Stephen Root, Gillian Welch, Musetta Vander, John McConnell	
D E C E M B E R	22	State and Main	Fine Line Features	David Mamet (director/screenplay); William H. Macy, Sarah Jessica Parker, Alec Baldwin, Julia Stiles, Philip Seymour Hoffman, Rebecca Pidgeon, David Paymer, Charles Durning, Patti LuPone, Clark Gregg, Lionel Mark Smith, Ricky Jay, Michael Higgins, Jonathan Katz, Laura Silverman, Michael Bradshaw, J.J. Johnston, John Krasinski	
D E C E M B E R	22	You Can Count on Me	Paramount Classics	Kenneth Lonergan (director/screenplay); Laura Linney, Mark Ruffalo, Matthew Broderick, Jon Tenney, Rory Culkin, J. Smith-Cameron, Josh Lucas, Gaby Hoffmann, Adam LeFevre, Amy Ryan, Michael Countryman, Kenneth Lonergan	
D E C E M B E R	25	All the Pretty Horses	Miramax Films / Columbia Pictures	Billy Bob Thornton (director); Ted Tally (screenplay); Matt Damon, Penélope Cruz, Henry Thomas, Lucas Black, Bruce Dern, Rubén Blades, Robert Patrick, Julio Oscar Mechoso, Míriam Colón, Sam Shepard, Raul Malo, Jo Harvey Allen, Julio C. Cedillo, Angelina C. Torres, Lonnie Rodriguez, J.D. Garfield, Marc Miles, J.D. Young	
D E C E M B E R	25	An Everlasting Piece	DreamWorks / Columbia Pictures / Baltimore/Spring Creek Pictures	Barry Levinson (director); Barry McEvoy (screenplay); Barry McEvoy, Brían F. O'Byrne, Anna Friel, Billy Connolly, Pauline McLynn, Laurence Kinlan, Enda Oates	
D E C E M B E R	25	Thirteen Days	New Line Cinema / Beacon Pictures	Roger Donaldson (director); David Self (screenplay); Kevin Costner, Bruce Greenwood, Steven Culp, Dylan Baker, Kevin Conway, Stephanie Romanov, Michael Fairman, Bill Smitrovich, Jack Blessing, Frank Wood, Ed Lauter, Pramod Kumar, Tim Kelleher, Len Cariou, Charles Esten, Olek Krupa, Lucinda Jenney, Jack McGee, Tom Everett, Oleg Vidov, John Aylward, Elya Baskin, Christopher Lawford, Peter White, Dakin Matthews, James Karen, Dan Ziskie	
D E C E M B E R	27	Traffic	USA Films	Steven Soderbergh (director); Stephen Gaghan (screenplay); Don Cheadle, Benicio del Toro, Michael Douglas, Luis Guzmán, Dennis Quaid, Catherine Zeta-Jones, Jacob Vargas, Marisol Padilla Sanchez, Tomas Milian, Amy Irving, Erika Christensen, Topher Grace, D.W. Moffett, James Brolin, Albert Finney, Steven Bauer, Clifton Collins Jr., Miguel Ferrer, Peter Riegert, Benjamin Bratt, Viola Davis, John Slattery, James Pickens Jr., Salma Hayek, Michael O'Neill, Yul Vazquez, Jack Conley, Eddie Velez, James Lew, Enrique Murciano, Carl Ciarfalio, Rick Avery, Majandra Delfino, Alec Roberts, Rena Sofer, Stacey Travis, Brandon Keener, Stephen Dunham, Margaret Travolta, Tucker Smallwood, Thomas Rosales Jr., Mike Siegel, Harsh Nayyar, Mary Pat Gleason, Vincent M. Ward, Jsu Garcia, Governor Bill Weld, Senator Don Nickles, Senator Harry Reid, Senator Barbara Boxer, Senator Orrin Hatch, Senator Charles Grassley, David Bickford	
D E C E M B E R	29	Shadow of the Vampire	Lions Gate Films / Saturn Films	E. Elias Merhige (director); Steven Katz (screenplay); John Malkovich, Willem Dafoe, Udo Kier, Cary Elwes, Catherine McCormack, Eddie Izzard, John Aden Gillett, Ronan Vibert, Nicholas Elliott, Sophie Langevin, Myriam Muller	

== See also ==
- List of 2000 box office number-one films in the United States
- 2000 in the United States
