= Josh Richman =

American actor

- Born: May 21, 1965 (age 60); Santa Monica, California

Josh Eric Richman (born May 21, 1965) is an American actor, writer, producer, director. and club promotor. He is best known for his work with Guns N' Roses.

== Career ==
His first acting job was a minor role in the science fiction television show V: The Series.

In 1991, Richman developed a professional relationship with Axl Rose from Guns N' Roses that led to him directing their video for a cover of Paul McCartney's "Live and Let Die". He is featured prominently in the Guns N' Roses home video titled, Making F@#$ing Videos Part 1 which chronicles his involvement in co-writing the promotional video for the GN'R hit "Don't Cry". Richman's involvement with the band landed him the inclusion of his photo in the booklet of their multi-platinum selling Use Your Illusion I and Use Your Illusion II albums. Richman had a small speaking role in the spoken word section of their cover of "Knockin' on Heaven's Door".

Richman's first big role was in the 1986 drama film River's Edge as Tony. He also appeared in two other films that year, Thrashin' and Modern Girls. He appeared in the 1987 film The Allnighter and the 1988 sequel film, Fright Night Part 2. Also in 1988, he played a role in the film Heathers. His other films include Kiss Kiss Bang Bang (2005), The Education of Charlie Banks (2007) and a minor role in Oliver Stone's Natural Born Killers and Adam Collis' Sunset Strip.

Richman had minor roles in the following television shows: The Twilight Zone, V: The Series, 21 Jump Street, and Pacific Blue.

Richman is the manager of a rock band called Deadsy.

In 2000, Richman and two others founded the Alliance, a club promotion agency in Hollywood.
