= Barry McEvoy =

Irish film actor/writer (born 1967)

- Born: July 11, 1967 (age 57); Belfast, Northern Ireland
- Occupations: Director; screenwriter; producer; actor
- Years active: 1993-Present
- Children: 1

Barry McEvoy (born July 11, 1967) is a Northern Irish film actor/writer best known for writing and playing the lead in An Everlasting Piece (2000), directed by Barry Levinson. McEvoy's first screen appearance of note was in the supporting role of a gangster in Gloria (1999), filmed after he had spent a decade performing in Off Broadway plays in New York City. He appeared in Gettysburg (1993), Veronica Guerin (2003), Pirates of the Caribbean: Dead Man's Chest (2006), and Five Minutes of Heaven (2009).

McEvoy based the screenplay of An Everlasting Piece upon the adventures of his own father selling toupées to both Protestants and Catholics in Belfast, Northern Ireland, during the height of the conflict.

Before his career in film, Barry was lead singer for legendary 1980s Washington, D.C., punk band Phlegm, who released several records before disbanding in 1988.

McEvoy lives in Dublin with his wife and son. He continues to do screenwriting and also stars in plays from time to time in both Ireland and the U.S.

== Filmography ==
Year	Title	Role	Notes
1993	Gettysburg	2nd Maine Soldier	
1997	Sax and Violins		
1999	Gloria	Terry	
2000	An Everlasting Piece	Colm	
2003	Gods and Generals	Marion Sibert	Uncredited
2003	Veronica Guerin	Gilligan Gang Member #2	
2006	Pirates of the Caribbean: Dead Man's Chest	Carruthers Guard	
2009	Five Minutes of Heaven	Joe's Chauffeur - 2008	
2013	Small Fish Small Pond	Dutch	
