= An Everlasting Piece =

2000 film by Barry Levinson

- Theatrical release poster
- Directed by: Barry Levinson
- Written by: Barry McEvoy
- Produced by: Mark Johnson; Louis DiGiaimo; Jerome O'Connor; Barry Levinson; Paula Weinstein
- Starring: Barry McEvoy; Brían F. O'Byrne; Anna Friel; Billy Connolly
- Edited by: Stu Linder
- Music by: Hans Zimmer
- Production companies: Bayahibe Films; Baltimore Spring/Creek Pictures
- Distributed by: DreamWorks Pictures (through DreamWorks Distribution LLC; United States and Canada); Columbia Pictures (through Columbia TriStar Film Distributors International; International)
- Release date: December 25, 2000
- Running time: 108 minutes
- Country: United States
- Language: English
- Budget: $14 million
- Box office: $75,228

An Everlasting Piece is a 2000 American comedy film directed by Barry Levinson, written by and starring Barry McEvoy. The plot involves two wig salesmen, Catholic Colm O'Neill and Protestant George, who live in war-torn Belfast, Northern Ireland, in the mid-1980s. The supporting cast includes comedian Billy Connolly as a patient in a psychiatric hospital. McEvoy based the screenplay on the adventures of his father Colm as a toupée peddler to both sides in the midst of the conflict. The movie was shot on location in both Belfast and Dublin.

An Everlasting Piece was released on December 25, 2000 by DreamWorks Pictures in the United States, with Columbia TriStar Film Distributors International releasing in other territories. The film received mixed reviews from critics and was a box office bomb, grossing $75,228 against a $14 million budget.

== Plot ==
Colm O'Neill takes a job as a barber in a Belfast psychiatric hospital. He meets the staff and is warned against talking about poetry with George, a fellow barber. When he brings it up, George subjects him to his own poor work but the pair chat anyway. Later, they meet an orderly escorting a new patient, whom he refers to as "The Scalper", described as the only seller of hair pieces in all of Northern Ireland until he had a nervous breakdown and scalped some of his own customers. Colm and George decide to meet with the Scalper to gain his list of customers; they intend to take over his former hairpiece monopoly. The Scalper agrees to give them the list.

Colm and George, calling themselves "The Piece People", embark on their plan to get rich. Colm's girlfriend Bronagh McGee helps. She sets up their first appointment with a Mr. Black, who eventually agrees to buy a hairpiece, although he denies having been a customer of "The Scalper". Bronagh had seen his picture in the newspaper (featured after he shot a Catholic) and, as he was bald, thought he'd be a good prospect. Having little success in sales, Colm and George discover they have competition from "Toupée or not Toupée", rivals who also acquired the client list. The supplier, "Wigs Of Wimbledon", decides to hold a meeting with two companies to inform them that the one who sells the most in a given time period will win an exclusive rights for all of Northern Ireland. The partners visit a farmer but lose the sale, learning that their competitors are underselling them. On a remote road, they are stopped by members of the Irish Republican Army (IRA), demanding to know what they are up to. This confrontation results in the partners selling a wig to the lead IRA man, who fails to notice it had been chewed by dogs.

The competition is raging but the IRA man accidentally leaves the unique wig at the scene of a bombing. The Royal Ulster Constabulary (RUC) trace it to The Piece People. After being interrogated, George and Colm have a falling-out. Meanwhile, the IRA man who lost the wig tracks Colm down and demands Colm sell him his whole inventory because now every bald Catholic in Northern Ireland is a potential suspect for the police. Colm refuses as George is a Protestant and thinks it would be unethical to protect the IRA because the sales would likely help The Piece People win the exclusive deal with Wigs Of Wimbledon.

Colm goes to a poetry reading by George and the two make peace. With the help of Bronagh, the duo learn that many British Army soldiers in Northern Ireland are suffering from alopecia (hair loss) due to the stressful conditions and secure a government contract to supply wigs to all soldiers who want them. With this, they win the competition and gain the rights to Northern Ireland.

== Cast ==
- Barry McEvoy as Colm O'Neill
- Brían F. O'Byrne as George
- Anna Friel as Bronagh McGee
- Pauline McLynn as Gerty
- Laurence Kinlan as Mickey O'Neill
- Billy Connolly as Scalper
- Des McAleer as Mr. Black
- Colum Convey as IRA Man
- Enda Oates as Detective

== Lawsuit against DreamWorks ==
In 2001, one of the film's producers, Jerome O'Connor, filed a $10 million lawsuit in federal court in Manhattan against Steven Spielberg's studio DreamWorks, the film's distributor. He complained that, although his film had received favorable reviews, the studio had reduced distribution from a projected 800 to eight theaters in the United States,and then pulled it from distribution. O'Connor alleged the film was "sabotaged" because director Barry Levinson would not change scenes to please British officials in its Foreign Office, which objected to its "sympathetic portrayal" of the IRA. O'Connor claimed DreamWorks officials feared the film might interfere with Spielberg's attaining an honorary knighthood (which Spielberg received in January 2001).

O'Connor argued that then Prime Minister Tony Blair had arranged for a loan of military equipment and 2,000 troops to Spielberg's production of Band of Brothers, which aired in 2001 on HBO and that Spielberg gave Blair's son Euan a job on the production, indicating a quid pro quo. A DreamWorks spokesman said the studio had not requested any film cuts. An Everlasting Piece was released on DVD, and the film, which had a $14,000,000 budget, earned $75,228. A decade after filing his lawsuit, a New York judge dismissed it in February 2011. O'Connor's counsel reserved the right to file an appeal, but ultimately did not file one.

== Reception ==
An Everlasting Piece received mixed reviews from critics and holds a 48% rating on Rotten Tomatoes, based on 43 reviews. The site's consensus states: "This comedy is too slight to leave an impression, and its attempts at whimsy are not as funny as they could have been." Metacritic, which uses a weighted average, assigned the film a score of 56 out of 100, based on 18 critics, indicating "mixed or average" reviews.
