= Ian Paul Cassidy =

British actor

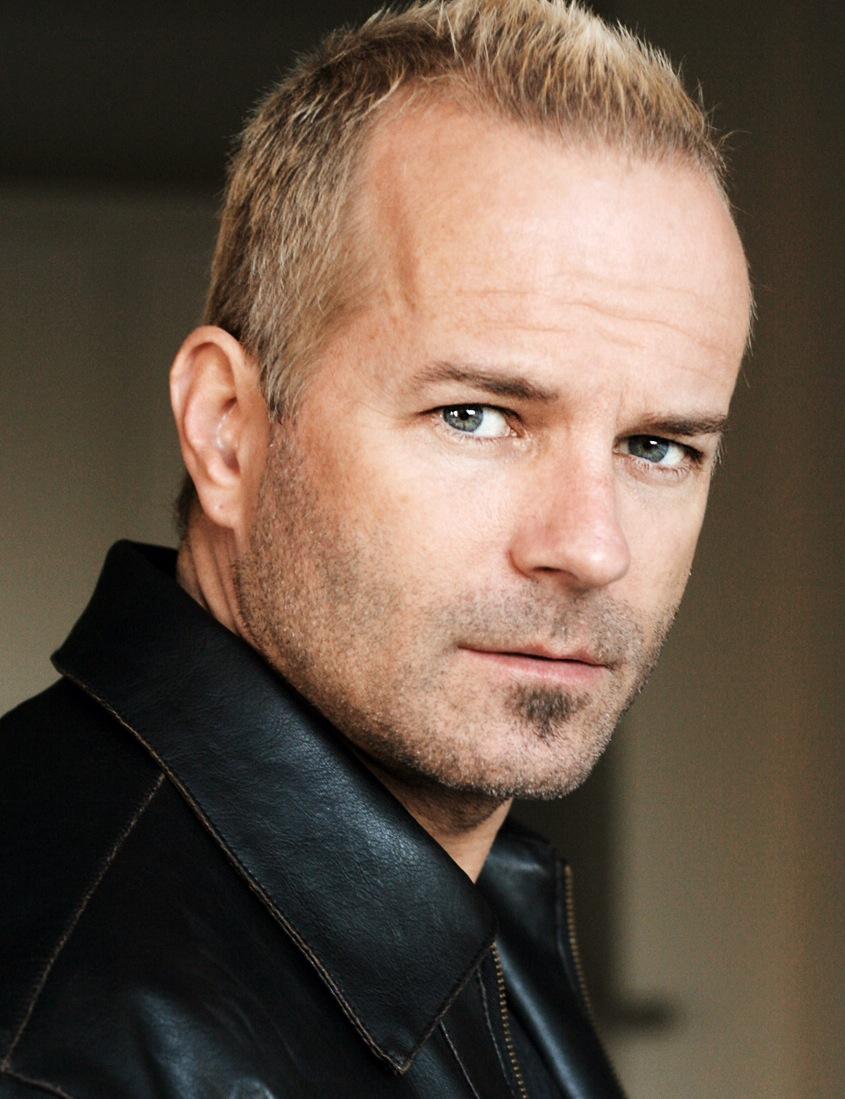
- Born: 4 November 1964 (age 61); Harrogate, West Riding of Yorkshire, England, UK
- Occupation: Actor

Ian Paul Cassidy (born 4 November 1964) is an English actor who has appeared mainly in American and Australian productions.

== Career ==
In 2000, he played Cracker Bob in Highlander: Endgame and in 2001 he had a starring role in the drama series The Beast, which was cancelled after five episodes. Cassidy first came to fame as the host of Australian television show Kids Company, on Channel 10. He also appeared in many Shakespeare productions across Australia.

During the 1980s, he participated in a number of Australian independent films. During the first years of the 1990s he appeared in many U.S. films like For the Boys, Wind and In the Line of Fire, and Dimension Film's Sci-Fi: Highlander: Endgame.

He has mainly appeared in American television series like The Pretender, EZ Streets, Pensacola: Wings of Gold, Walker, Texas Ranger, Drake & Josh, Desperate Housewives, Numb3rs, 24, The Pacific, Monk, The Bold and the Beautiful, The Young and the Restless and numerous others. He has also appeared in many video games for MachineGames, including the highly acclaimed Wolfenstein: The New Order as Bobby Bram.
