= Tseng Cheng =

Hong Kong businessman and public welfare advocate (1915-2008)

Tseng Cheng OBE JP
- 曾正
- Born: July 29, 1915; Tangshan, Hebei, China
- Died: 28 August 2008 (aged 93)
- Occupation: Businessperson
- Known for: Founder of Tseng Brothers Construction Company, Chairman of Tung Wah Group of Hospitals and the Hong Kong Tuberculosis, Chest and Heart Disease Foundation
- Children: 12

Tseng Cheng OBE JP (Chinese: 曾正; pinyin: Zeng Zheng; 29 July 1915 – 28 August 2008) was a Hong Kong businessman, government advisor, public welfare advocate, and philanthropist. He has ancestral roots in Zhuhai, Guangdong. He was best noted for his positions as a board member of the Hong Kong Housing Authority, Director of the Tung Wah Group of Hospitals, and Chairman of the Hong Kong Tuberculosis, Chest and Heart Disease Foundation.

== Early years and education ==
Born on 29 July 1915 near Tangshan, Hebei, Tseng's father died when he was just fourteen. His father set his childhood ambition to study medicine, but to save without the expensive medical fees from his father, Tseng Cheng was forced to study civil engineering instead. He fled to Tianjin before the outbreak of World War II.

He studied at Diocesan Boys' School, where he finished the Junior Matriculation exam of the University of Hong Kong. Due to financial difficulties from his father's illness, he was not able to afford further education in Hong Kong. He left school at 17, and find work to support the family. He obtained work first as apprentices and later as a piece worker for an engineering and construction company, where he was joined by his younger brother when he, too, reach 17. They both worked very hard for the next couple of years.

From the age of 20 to 23, through money he saved from working, he completed university education in Canton, China, in a private college, Citizen's University 廣州國文大學 (now closed). He graduated from university just before the Japanese invasion in 1937. He took up an engineering job repairing bridges of the Kowloon Canton Railway damaged by the Japanese, and was involved in constructing the Humen Pearl River Bridge. His family (mother and brother Pei) fled to the neutral French concession in Guangzhouwan (present day Zhanjiang) at the height of the Japanese invasion of Hong Kong.

== Career ==
After the war, he became a successful real estate developer in Hong Kong, founding the Tseng Brother's Construction Company. A majority of his projects are located in Tsim Sha Tsui and Repulse Bay.

In 1965, he was appointed by Governor Sir Robert Brown Black to the Hong Kong Housing Board (predecessor of the Hong Kong Housing Authority). As a member, he was instrumental in encouraging the board to improve living conditions of the poor. He strongly advised the Housing Board to continue its program resettling the numerous dwellers of squatter housing into proper government built flats. He noted that poor living conditions was an indirect cause of public disturbances such as the Hong Kong 1967 Leftist Riots. He also served on the Legislative Council of Hong Kong, advising Hong Kong Governor David Wilson, Baron Wilson of Tillyorn.

From 1975 to 1999, he became the vice-chairman of the Hong Kong Tuberculosis, Chest and Heart Diseases Association, where he was involved in the redevelopment of Ruttonjee Hospital. He was promoted to chairman of the board of Directors in 2000. Tseng also contributed to the redevelopment of Grantham Hospital and Freni Home, nursing home. He also served on the board of directors of the Tung Wah Group of Hospitals from 1959 to 1964, serving as chairman from 1963 to 1964 and board member from 1982 to 2004.

In 2003, he served on the Hong Kong SARS Expert Committee to shape Hong Kong's response to the severe acute respiratory syndrome (SARS) outbreak. One of his last presentations included a Global Perspective on Public Health presentation at the Conference on Public Health and Inauguration of the World Association of Chinese Public Health Professionals.

== Philanthropy ==
It is reported that Tseng Cheng served in over 20 public service positions in Hong Kong, Macau, and Zhuhai, China. His work spanned education, culture, disaster relief, public health, housing, and welfare. He was president of several charitable organisations, including director of the Tung Wah Group of Hospitals.

In 2007, the Tseng Charitable Fund was established for charitable causes in Hong Kong and China. According to statistics, the Fund has donated over 1,180 million yuan for public welfare for work in education, health, and disaster relief.

In the spring of 1994, Tseng returned from Hong Kong to visit his hometown of Zhuhai to find primitive, poor school conditions. In the late 1990s, Tseng funded the construction of a Vocational School, Zhuhai Ji Da Elementary School (吉大小学) and a student's residence in his ancestral home of Zhuhai, China. He also created a 10 million yuan Tseng Scholarship for high achieving, low income students. He visited the school ten times to oversee the high-quality construction of the five-story building. His donation of nearly 15 million yuan was the largest ever donated to Zhuhai by patriotic compatriots

In 1998, Tseng donated to the renovation of the Tseng Cheng Zhuhai Nanping Polytechnic School (曾正理工学校). In 2000, the government mandated that the school needed a new student apartment and solicited donations due to tight education funding. Tseng donated an additional 300 million yuan with no conditions. Tseng served as honorary President of the Zhuhai Nanping Polytechnic School, which was subsequently named after him. With student apartments, integrated laboratories, fencing halls, and a swimming pool, the school is one of the highest performing schools in Zhuhai. A small museum in the school is dedicated to him. In addition, the 20 million yuan Tseng scholarship program rewards 100 students annually for outstanding performance.

In 1994, Tseng was awarded Guangdong Province's Advancement for Teaching of Individuals (尊师重教先进个人) award. In 1998, he was recognised with the Zhuhai Advancement of Children (珠海市热爱儿童先进个人) award and was hired to consult for the CPPCC Xiangzhou District Committee.

In 1999, Tseng was awarded Zhuhai Honorary Citizenship by various members of the Chinese People's Political Consultative Conference (CPPCC) and the District People's Congress.

After the 2008 Sichuan earthquake, the Tseng Charity Fund donated 10 million yuan to support earthquake relief work in Wenchuan, China.

== Personal ==
Following the end of World War II, Tseng returned to Hong Kong and married a nurse from Macau. They had seven sons and five daughters, many of whom have studied or settled overseas in the United Kingdom or the United States of America.

Tseng suffered a stroke in 2004. At age 93, he died at St. Theresa's Hospital on 28 August 2008. His life was commemorated by students and officials of the Zhuhai schools he built.

== Honours and recognition ==
He was awarded an Order of the British Empire by Queen Elizabeth II, Charles, Prince of Wales, and Diana, Princess of Wales in 1995 for his contributions to Hong Kong society.

- MBE, 1965
- Justice of Peace, 1965
- OBE, 1995
