= Sunset Strip (2000 film) =

2000 film by Adam Collis

- VHS cover
- Directed by: Adam Collis
- Screenplay by: Randall Jahnson; Russell DeGrazier
- Story by: Randall Jahnson
- Produced by: Art Linson; John Linson
- Starring: Simon Baker; Anna Friel; Nick Stahl; Rory Cochrane; Adam Goldberg; Jared Leto
- Cinematography: Ron Fortunato
- Edited by: Bruce Cannon; Angus Wall
- Music by: Stewart Copeland
- Production company: Fox 2000 Pictures
- Distributed by: 20th Century Fox
- Release date: August 18, 2000
- Running time: 95 minutes
- Country: United States
- Language: English

Sunset Strip is a 2000 American comedy-drama film directed by Adam Collis for 20th Century Fox. The story was written by Randall Jahnson, who previously examined the rock scene in his scripts for The Doors and Dudes, and he and Russell DeGrazier adapted the story into a screenplay.

The film takes place in 1972, during one 24-hour period on Los Angeles's famed Sunset Strip, where the lives of a group of young people are about to change forever. Anna Friel stars as Tammy Franklin, a clothing designer, and Nick Stahl plays Zach, a novice guitarist; Jared Leto stars as Glen Walker, an up-and-coming country rocker. Simon Baker, Adam Goldberg, Rory Cochrane and Tommy Flanagan also feature. The film began shooting on November 9, 1998, and ended on January 11, 1999.

== Plot ==
Sunset Strip tells the story of a number of music industry artists, all in the span of 24 hours on the Sunset Strip in Hollywood. Michael secretly pines for Tammy. She is busy sleeping with the up-and-coming country rocker Glen Walker and the rock star Duncan. Zach and his band are opening at the Whisky a Go Go for Duncan Reed and the Curb. In these 24 hours, they all cross paths pursue their dreams.

== Cast ==
- Anna Friel as Tammy Franklin, a costume designer with a shop situated near the legendary Whisky a Go Go, who has sex with Walker and Reid
- Jared Leto as Glen Walker, a country rocker
- Tommy Flanagan as Duncan Reid, a rock star who is influenced by Jim Morrison and David Bowie
- Adam Goldberg as Marty Shapiro, a fast-talking record producer from the Valley
- Nick Stahl as Zach, a novice guitarist who believes that he is the successor of Jimi Hendrix
- Rory Cochrane as Felix, a troubled songwriter whose dream is to die of a drug and alcohol overdose
- Simon Baker as Michael Scott, a photographer who photographs Tammy Franklin and the musicians
- Darren E. Burrows as Bobby
- John Randolph as Mr. Niederhaus
- Stephanie Romanov as Christine
- Mary Lynn Rajskub as Eileen
- Maurice Chasse as Nigel
- Mike Rad as Badger
- Josh Richman as Barry Bernstein

== Music ==
Stewart Copeland was approached by director Adam Collis to assemble the score for the film. Copeland recorded a slew of vintage songs. The music, some scored by Stewart Copeland, some written and selected by Robbie Robertson, is made in a bygone style that sometimes consciously mimics the multicharacter 1970s dramas.

== Release and reception ==
On August 18, 2000, Sunset Strip opened to the public in limited release in a single theater in Los Angeles and New York City, and grossed $3,926 during the opening weekend. After two months, on October 12, 2000, the film was screened at the Austin Film Festival. Writing in Variety, Robert Koehler said "Interesting structure provides pic with plenty of opportunities for social satire, human comedy and chance encounters, but few setups are ever dramatically fulfilled." Kevin Thomas in Los Angeles Times said "Moves smoothly amid a near-perfect period evocation, captured in an array of shifting moods." Writing in Mr. Showbiz, Kevin Maynard praised the film, saying that it "has its funky charms." Cheryl DeWolfe of the Apollo Movie Guide said "This modestly successful drama follows a young ensemble cast through the ups and downs of the music business in all its stages of stardom."

Sunset Strip was released on VHS on February 13, 2001, and was re-released on September 4, 2001. On June 1, 2004, 20th Century Fox Home Entertainment released a DVD for region 1. The DVD release includes a wide-screen and a full-screen version of the film.
