= Adam Collis =

American filmmaker and actor

- Born: Adam Collis; United States
- Occupations: Film director, actor
- Years active: 1995–present

Adam Collis is an American filmmaker and actor. He attended the Duke University from 1986 to 1990 and the University of California, Los Angeles from 2007 to 2010. He also studied cinema at the University of Southern California from 1991 to 1997. Collis first work was the assistant director for the Scott Derrickson's short Love in the Ruins (1995). In 1998, he played "Crankshaft" in Eric Koyanagi's Hundred Percent.

He has also directed several shorts and documentaries, including the award-winning short film, Mad Boy, I'll Blow Your Blues Away. In 2000, Collis directed Sunset Strip, a feature film about the Los Angeles rock 'n roll scene in the early 1970s. The film was produced by Art Linson and starred Simon Baker, Nick Stahl, Jared Leto and Anna Friel. He received awards and nominations from the Aspen Shortsfest, Austin Film Festival, Hamptons International Film Festival, Los Angeles Independent Film Festival, New York Comedy Festival, and Palm Springs International Festival of Short Films.

Infamous amongst his students for coining the term "Image Size Variation" and "Psycho-Emotional Instrument" when referring to directing actors.
