= List of Journeyman cast members =

This is a list of recurring actors on the US television show Journeyman.

== Main cast ==
This list shows the show's main cast, and the number of episodes for which each actor has been credited in. Normally the actors are only credited in the episodes which they appear in — exceptions to this are noted below.

Actor	Character	Appearances
Actor	Character	Season 1
Kevin McKidd	Dan Vasser	13
Gretchen Egolf	Katie Vasser	13
Moon Bloodgood	Livia Beale	13
Reed Diamond	Jack Vasser	13
Brian Howe	Hugh Skillen	13
Charles Henry Wyson	Zack Vasser	13

== Guest stars ==
This is a list of guest stars as well as recurring characters.

Episode Number	Episode Name	Character Name	Actor Name
101	"A Love of a Lifetime"	Neal Gaines	Warren, Christopher
101	"A Love of a Lifetime"	Nicole Gaines	Curnen, Monique
101	"A Love of a Lifetime"	Jacob Gaines	Lampkin, Joseph
101	"A Love of a Lifetime"	Unknown	Barr, Steven
101	"A Love of a Lifetime"	Unknown	Lau, Cici
101	"A Love of a Lifetime"	Waiter	Ahku
101	"A Love of a Lifetime"	Unknown	Allen, Ivan
101	"A Love of a Lifetime"	Bus Driver	Bynum, Nate
101	"A Love of a Lifetime"	Tourist	Chan, Goldie
101	"A Love of a Lifetime"	Patron	Dominguez, Ricky
101	"A Love of a Lifetime"	Tourist	Galvin, Athena
101	"A Love of a Lifetime"	Guy in Thriller jacket	Grant, Michael F.
101	"A Love of a Lifetime"	Max	Lee, Max
101	"A Love of a Lifetime"	Dock Worker/Produce Vendor	Redlick, Jeff
101	"A Love of a Lifetime"	Actress	Rue, Betsy
101	"A Love of a Lifetime"	Driver	Big Spence
102	"Friendly Skies"	Cable Car Conductor	Angelo, Chris
102	"Friendly Skies"	Boyfriend	Barry, Devin
102	"Friendly Skies"	Billy Marble	Cacia, J.R.
102	"Friendly Skies"	Cab Driver	Carberry, Joseph
102	"Friendly Skies"	Tana Bloom	Chastain, Jessica
102	"Friendly Skies"	Flight Attendant #3	Heggins, Tracey
102	"Friendly Skies"	Tipsy Passenger (scene deleted)	Held, Harrison
102	"Friendly Skies"	Revolving Door Man	Hodges, David
102	"Friendly Skies"	Scotch Man	Hodges, Franklin Dennis
102	"Friendly Skies"	70's Pilot	Kildare, Martin
102	"Friendly Skies"	Flight Attendant #2	Polan, Chase
102	"Friendly Skies"	TSA Official Myers	Reed, Darryl Alan
102	"Friendly Skies"	Garbage Man	Richard, Zachary Aaron
102	"Friendly Skies"	Trevor Mason	Wright, Keith Sellon
102	"Friendly Skies"	Superior	Shahbaz, Philip
102	"Friendly Skies"	Trevor's Body Guard	Big Spence
102	"Friendly Skies"	TSA Official Ramsey	Spencer, Jonathan Walker
102	"Friendly Skies"	Carl Hanson	St. Esprit, Patrick
102	"Friendly Skies"	Jessie	Tigerman, Gabriel
102	"Friendly Skies"	Shooting Boy	Timsit, Jordan
102	"Friendly Skies"	Ticket Agent	Wang, Stephanie Y.
102	"Friendly Skies"	Diana Bloom	Wersching, Annie
102	"Friendly Skies"	Crime Scene Detective	Bredt, Jeff
103	"Game Three"	Alan Pratt	Billingsley, John
103	"Game Three"	Muscular Guy	Brown, Jeffrey Nicholas
103	"Game Three"	Thug #1	Hentschel, Falk
103	"Game Three"	Greg Weil	Humphreys, Matthew
103	"Game Three"	Officer Burke	Jones, Asante
103	"Game Three"	Poker Player	Kim, Paul H.
103	"Game Three"	Julius	Pape, Paul
103	"Game Three"	Bookie	Proscia, Ray
103	"Game Three"	Pedestrian	Ursal, Reno
103	"Game Three"	Uniform Cop	Yu, Anthony
103	"Game Three"	Passerby (uncredited)	Actor
103	"Game Three"	Character	Camp, Rick
104	"The Year of the Rabbit"	Person	Blackman, Jeana
104	"The Year of the Rabbit"	William	Daugherty, Josh
104	"The Year of the Rabbit"	Elliot Langley	Everett, Tom
104	"The Year of the Rabbit"	Greg Weil	Humphreys, Matthew
104	"The Year of the Rabbit"	Melissa Waters	Ishibashi, Brittany
104	"The Year of the Rabbit"	Officer Burke	Jones, Asante
104	"The Year of the Rabbit"	'94 Cafe/Bar Patron	Lundquist, Patterson
104	"The Year of the Rabbit"	Bride	Montañez, Beatriz
104	"The Year of the Rabbit"	Matthew Tarbell	Owens, Geoffrey
104	"The Year of the Rabbit"	Dr. Theresa Sanchez	Sheridan, Lisa
104	"The Year of the Rabbit"	'98 Hooker	Tharani, Rayna
104	"The Year of the Rabbit"	Jessie	Tigerman, Gabriel
105	"The Legend of Dylan McCleen"	Elliot Langley	Everett, Tom
105	"The Legend of Dylan McCleen"	Dr. Theresa Sanchez	Sheridan, Lisa
105	"The Legend of Dylan McCleen"	Frank Vasser	Gretsch, Joel
105	"The Legend of Dylan McCleen"	Jessie	Tigerman, Gabriel
105	"The Legend of Dylan McCleen"	Dylan McLeen	Pierce, Jeffrey
105	"The Legend of Dylan McCleen"	Bartender	Sellitti, Mario
106	"Keepers"	Dr. Theresa Sanchez	Sheridan, Lisa
106	"Keepers"	Steven Kowalchuk	Baesel, Nathan
106	"Keepers"	Young Jack Vasser	Behnken, Lukas
106	"Keepers"	Adult Michael	Campbell, Scott Michael
106	"Keepers"	Young Dan Vasser	Eaton, Brando
106	"Keepers"	Crew Cut	Looc, Sam
106	"Keepers"	Garage Worker	Manesh, Marshall
106	"Keepers"	Young Steven Kowalchuk	McLaughlin, Dylan
106	"Keepers"	Martin Fenner	Uy, Alain
107	"Double Down"	Leather Jacket	Chang, Steve
107	"Double Down"	Ed Macklin	Franklin, Don
107	"Double Down"	Martin Fenner	Uy, Alain
108	"Winterland"	Elliot Langley	Everett, Tom
108	"Winterland"	Anna Armstrong	Bonilla, Michelle
108	"Winterland"	Abby Armstrong	Harshman, Margo
108	"Winterland"	Bonnie	Mazur, Heather
108	"Winterland"	Mo Rollins	Sandvig, Jake
108	"Winterland"	Agent Richard Garrity	Schulze, Paul
108	"Winterland"	Celia Wogan	Wasser, Alexi
108	"Winterland"	Sammy	Wing, Sean
109	"Emily"	Dr. Theresa Sanchez	Sheridan, Lisa
109	"Emily"	Agent Richard Garrity	Schulze, Paul
109	"Emily"	Martha	Bond, Elizabeth
109	"Emily"	Chowder Man	Cheng, Michael David
109	"Emily"	Aeden Bennett	Sbarge, Raphael
109	"Emily"	Emily	Indigo
109	"Emily"	Liquor Store Manager	Lai, Evan
109	"Emily"	Clerk	Nordella, Nick
110	"Blowback"	Agent Richard Garrity	Schulze, Paul
110	"Blowback"	Aeden Bennett	Sbarge, Raphael
110	"Blowback"	Young Aeden Bennett	Ford, Colin
110	"Blowback"	Dr. Ellis	Beach, John F.
110	"Blowback"	Doctor	Bethune, Patricia
110	"Blowback"	Maggie	Crisp, Chelsey
110	"Blowback"	Teenager #1	John, Keston
110	"Blowback"	Sheriff Bennett	Lange, Eric
111	"Home By Another Way"	Caroline Vasser	Sprayberry, Ellery
