= Inés Moreno =

Argentinian actress (1932–2020)

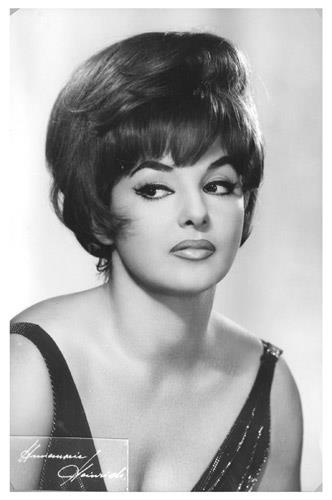
- Inés Moreno in 1963
- Born: 1932
- Died: 20 December 2020 (aged 88)
- Occupation: Actress
- Years active: 1947-1991

Dora Esilda Moreno or commonly known as Inés Moreno (1932 – 20 December 2020) was an Argentine actress who became a figure during the Golden Age of Argentine cinema. Known for her vampish roles, she made her feature film debut in the 1948 comedy La serpiente de cascabel and went on to star in productions such as La doctora Castañuelas, Escándalo nocturno, Isla Brava, and Behind a Long Wall. She was married to actor Juan Carlos Barbieri—with whom she had a daughter, actress Andrea Barbieri—and later having marriage Uruguayan-Argentine journalist Lucho Avilés. Moreno died in Buenos Aires at the age of 88.

== Early life and career ==
She was born in 1932 as Dora Esilda Moreno. Her acting debut was in La serpiente de cascabel in 1948, directed by Carlos Schlieperen. She continued her acting by starring in La doctora Castañuelas, directed by Luis José Moglia Barth, alongside Roberto Airaldi, Alfredo Alaria, María Antinea, and Augusto Codecá.

Then, she appeared in Escándalo nocturno in 1951, with José Cibrián and directed by Juan Carlos Thorry. In the same year, she also appeared in El complejo de Felipe.She returned to starring in three movies in 1958, including Isla Brava, directed by Mario Soffici, and starring Elsa Daniel and Alberto Argibay. The second movie is Behind a Long Wall, directed by Lucas Demare, starring Lautaro Murúa. Her final movie in that year was Hay que bañar al nene, acted alongside Juan José Míguez. In her acting, she usually acted in vampish roles.

She married with Juan Carlos Barbieri and had daughter, Andrea Barberi before they divorced and having relationship with Lucho Avilés.

== Death ==
She was died on 20 December 2020 due undisclosed reason.

== Selected filmography ==
- Behind a Long Wall (1958)

== Bibliography ==
- Vega, Hugo F. Televisión Argentina: 1951-1975: La Información. Ediciones del Jilguero, 2001.
