= Saturn Award for Best Actor on Television =

US media award

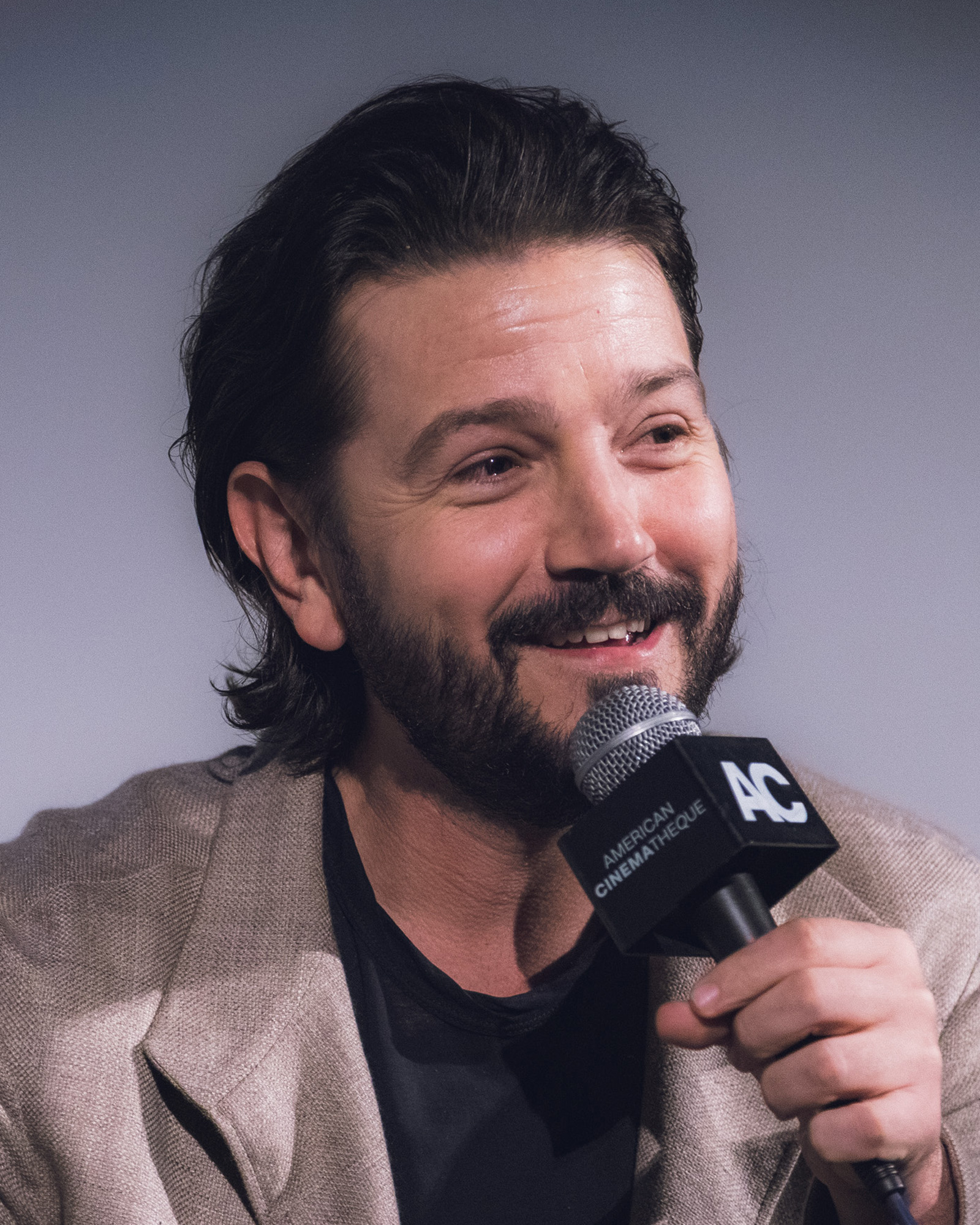
- The 2024/2025 recipient: Diego Luna
- Awarded for: Best performance of the year by a male in a leading role in a genre television series
- Country: United States
- Presented by: Academy of Science Fiction, Fantasy and Horror Films
- First award: 1996
- Currently held by: Diego Luna for Andor (2024/2025)
- Website: www.saturnawards.org

The following is a list of Saturn Award winners for Best Actor on Television (formerly Best Genre TV Actor).

The award is presented annually by the Academy of Science Fiction, Fantasy and Horror Films, honoring the work of actors in science fiction, fantasy, and horror fiction on television.

As of the 47th Saturn Awards in 2022, the award is known as Best Actor in a Network or Cable Television Series and features a sister category: Saturn Award for Best Actor in a Streaming Television Series.

(NOTE: Year refers to year of eligibility, the actual ceremonies are held the following year.)

The winners are listed in bold.

== Winners and nominees ==
Saturn award gallery

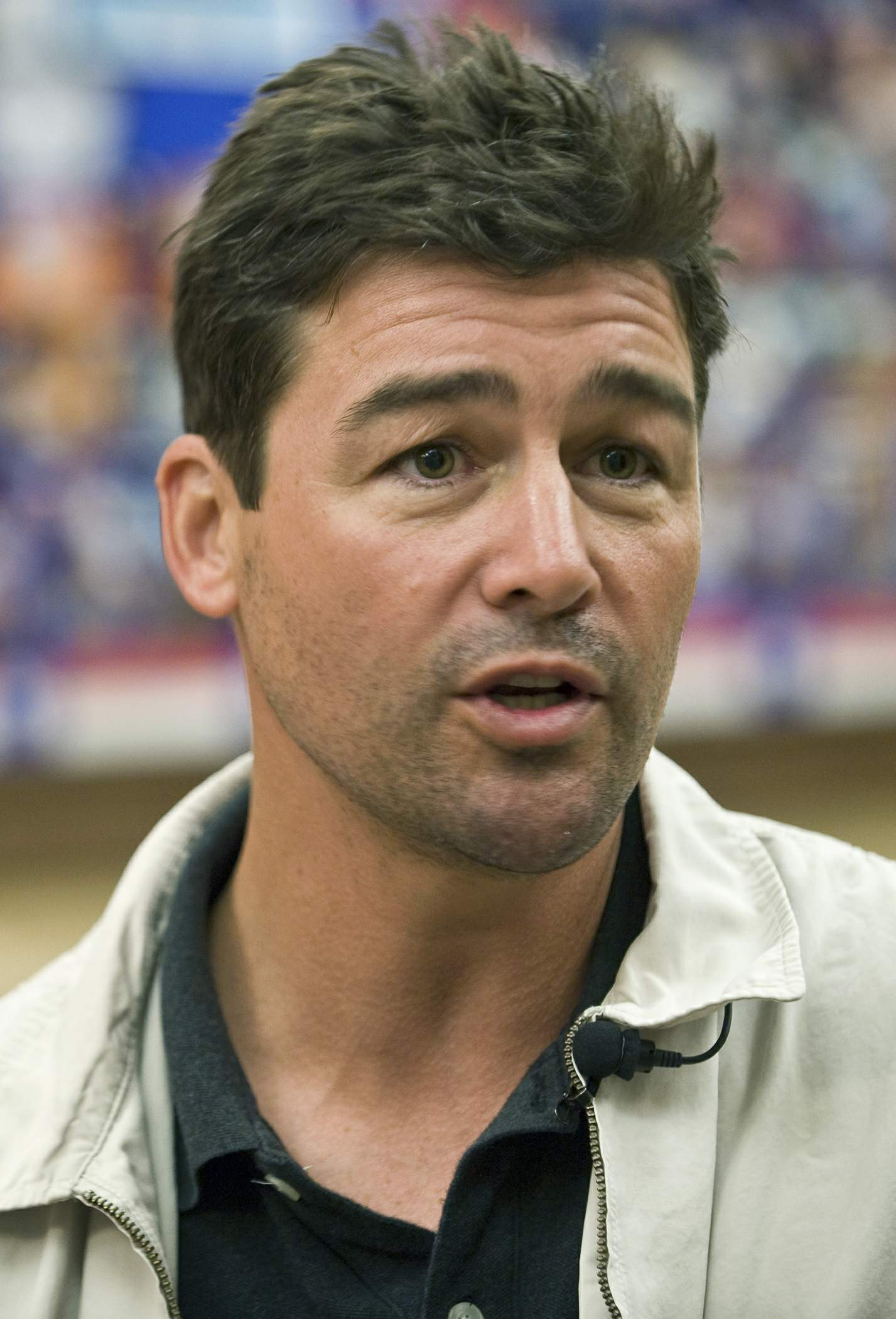

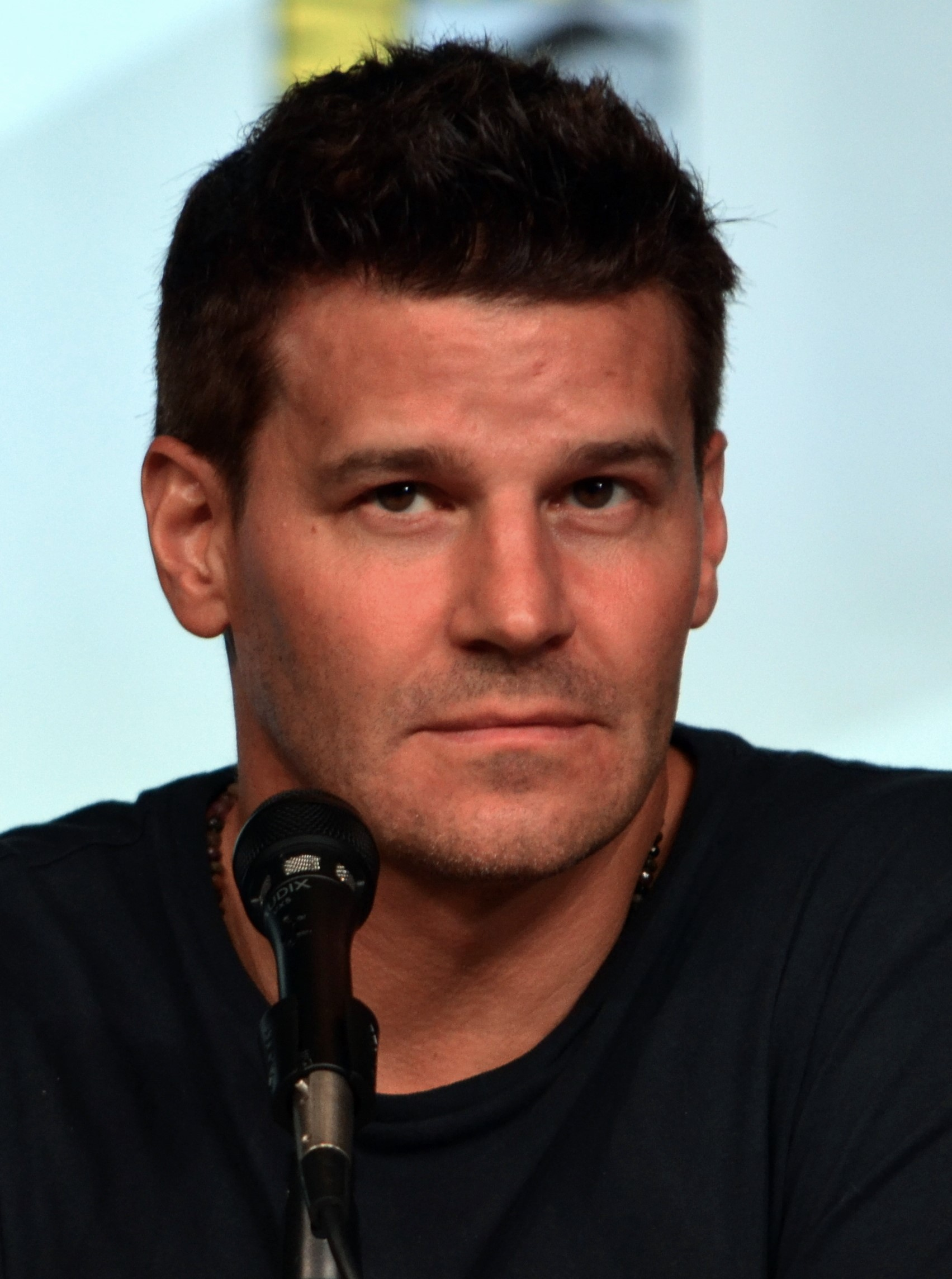

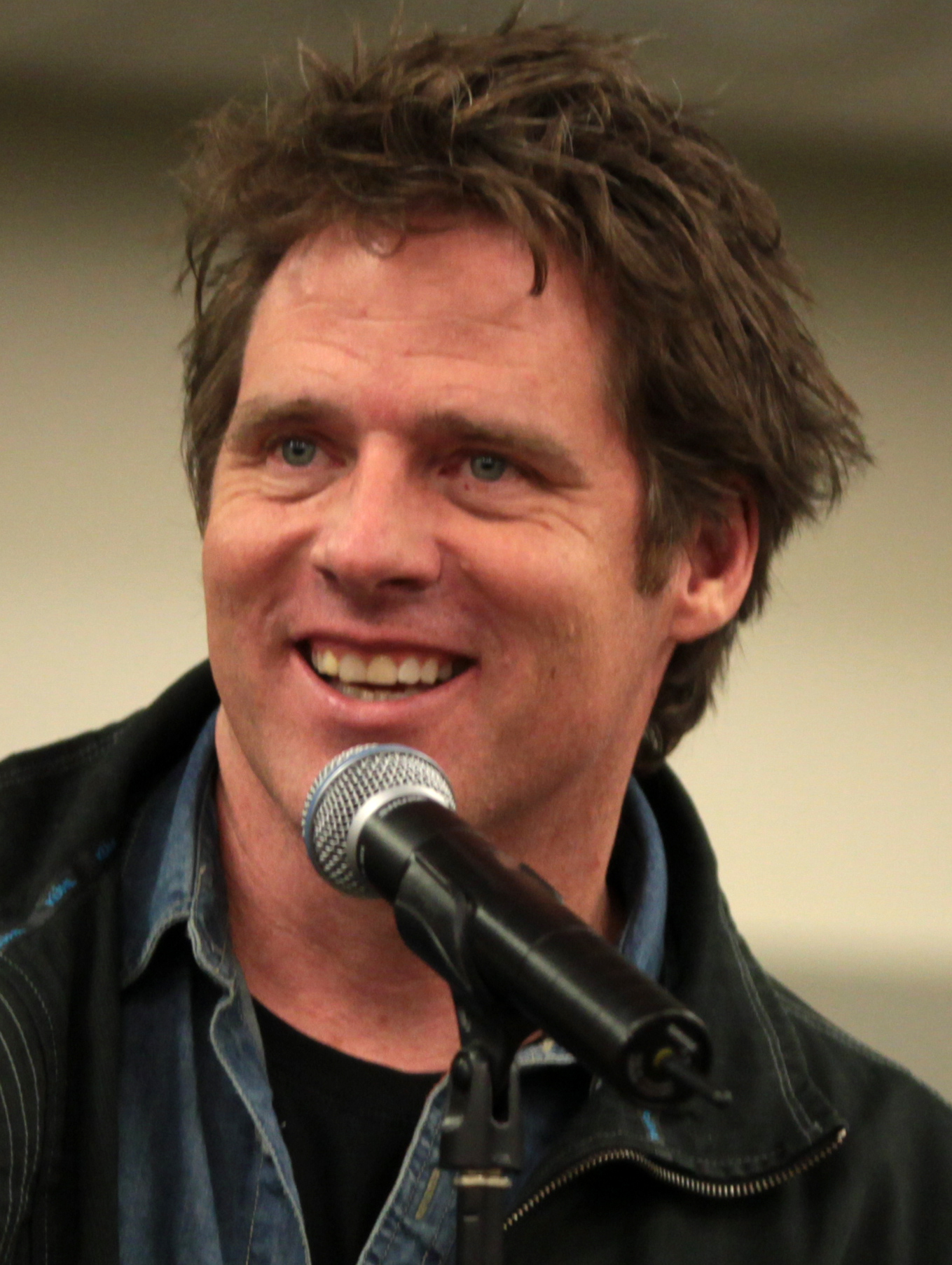

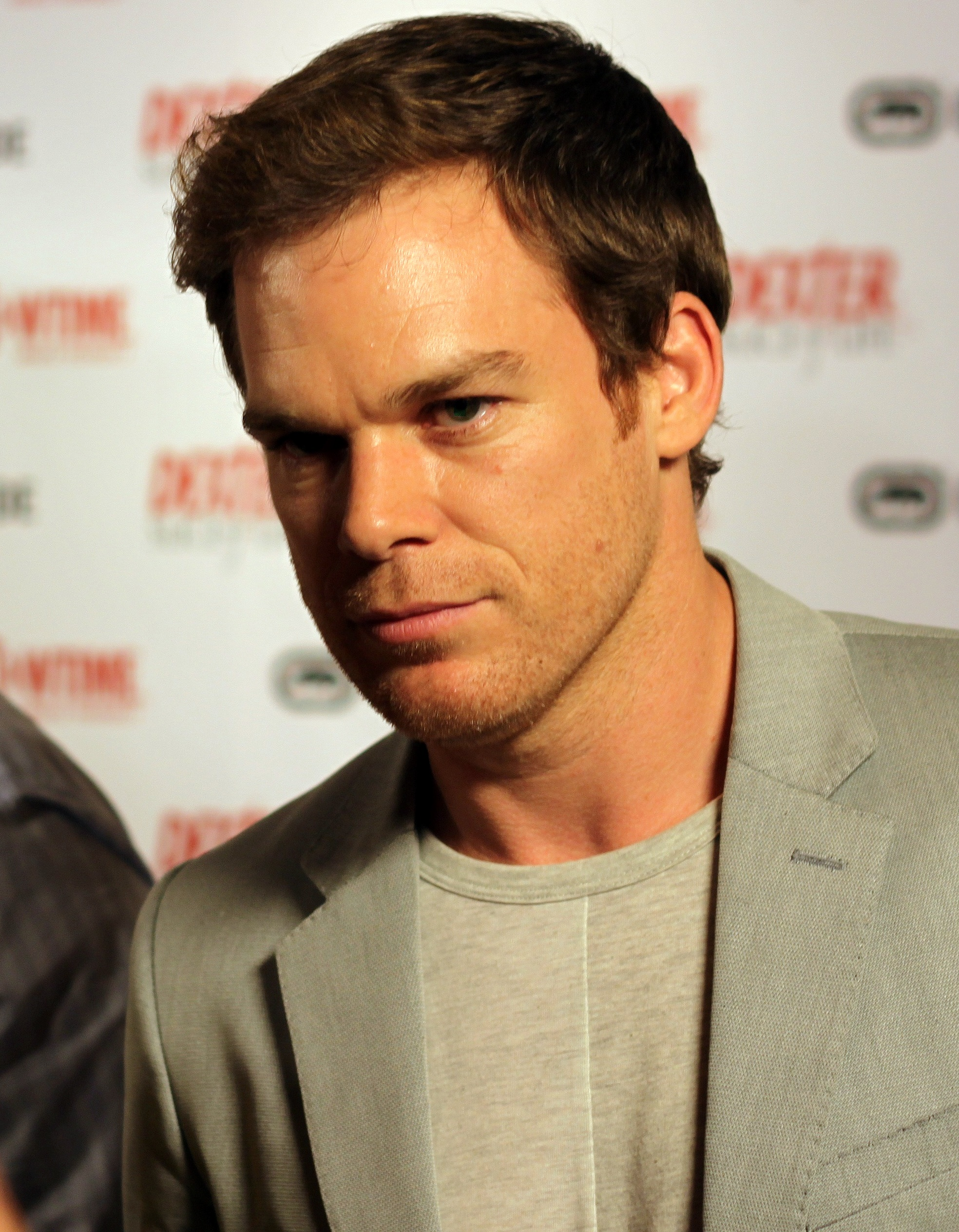

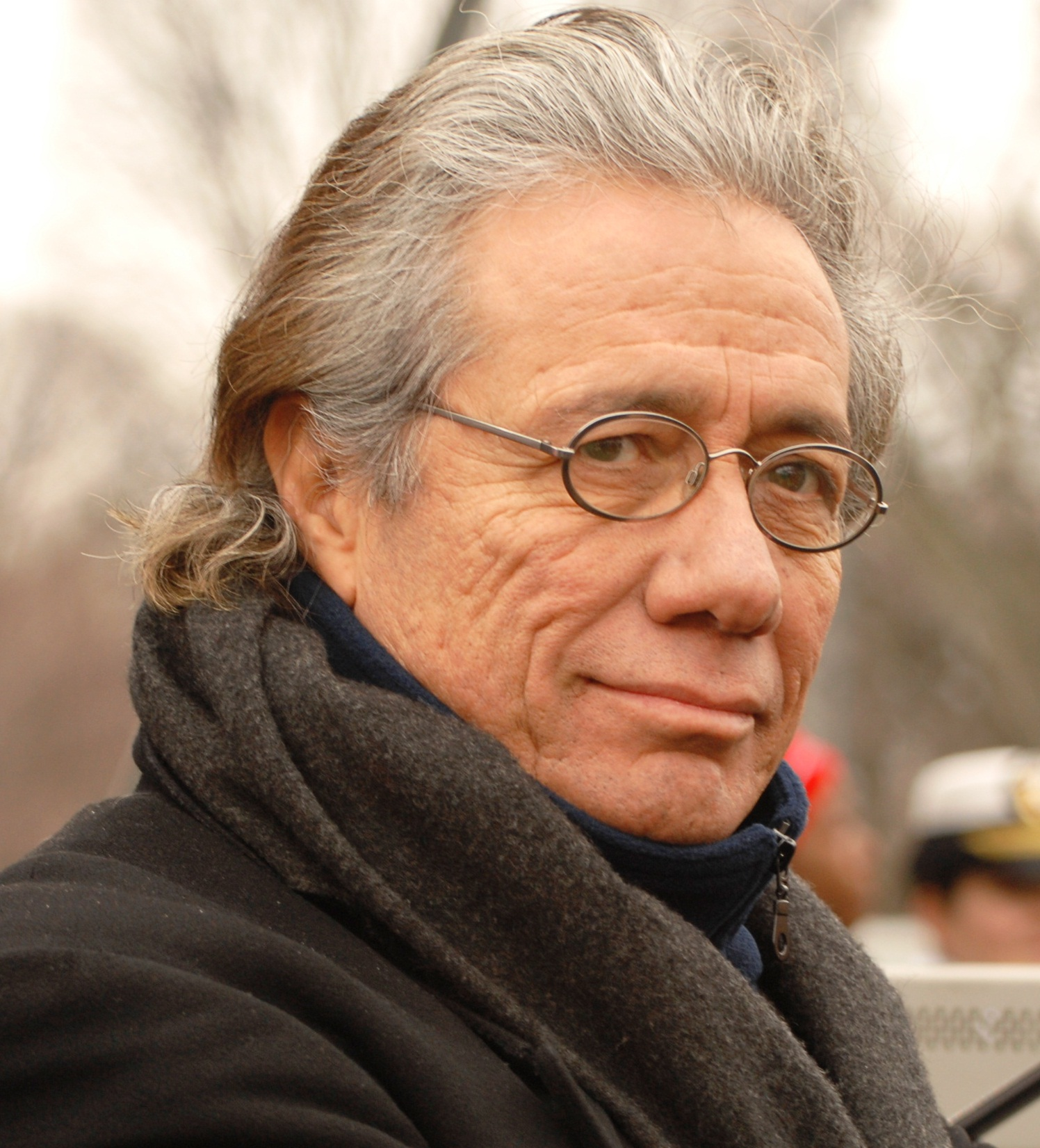

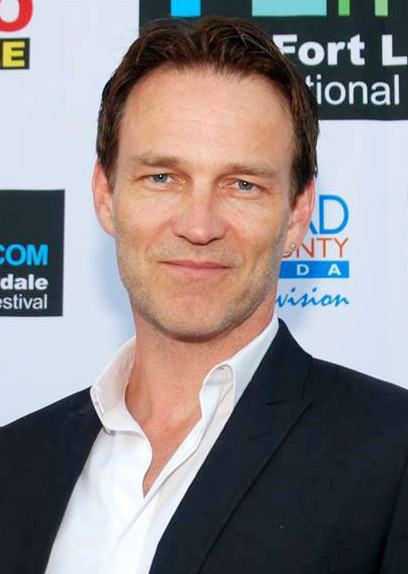

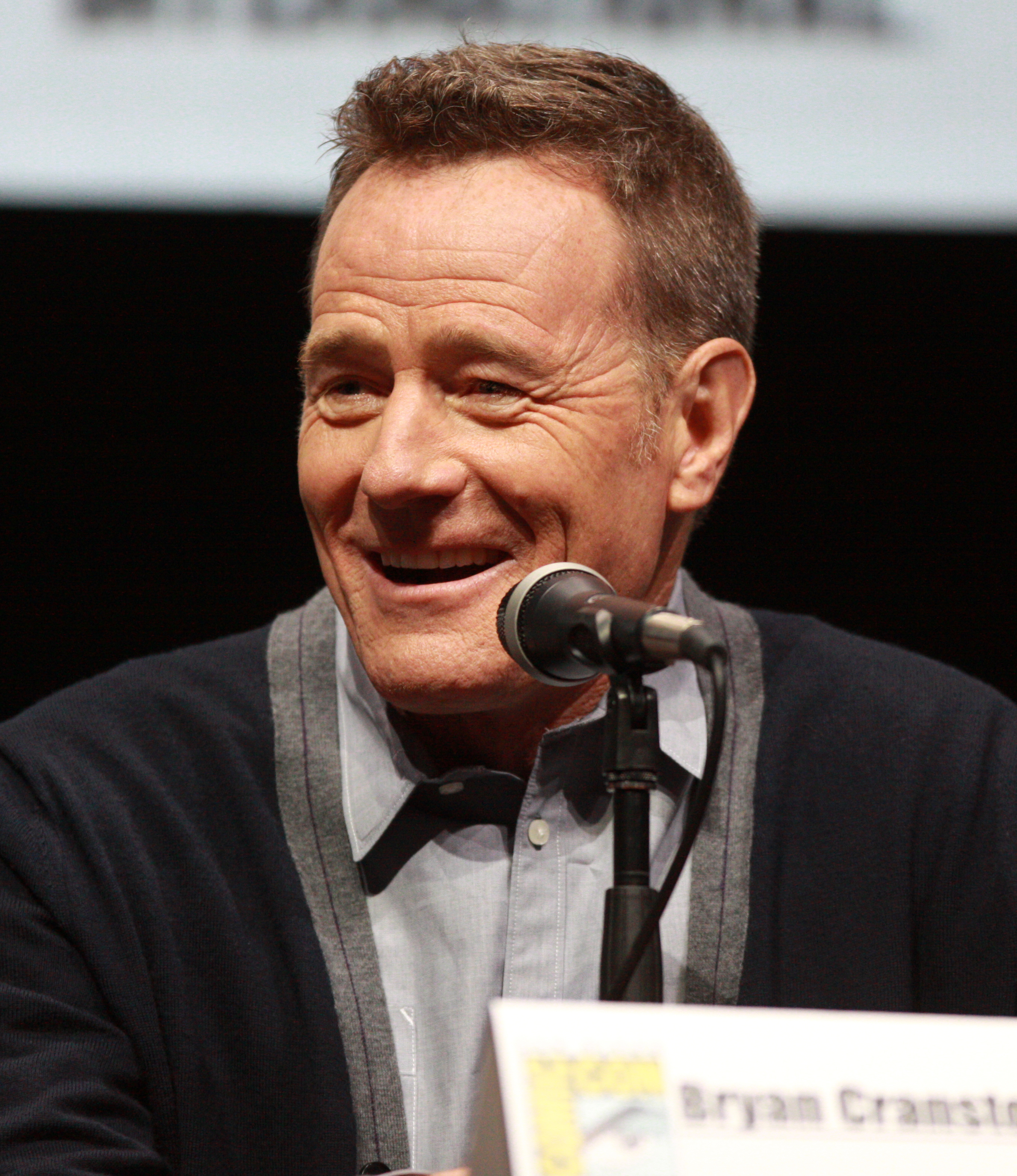

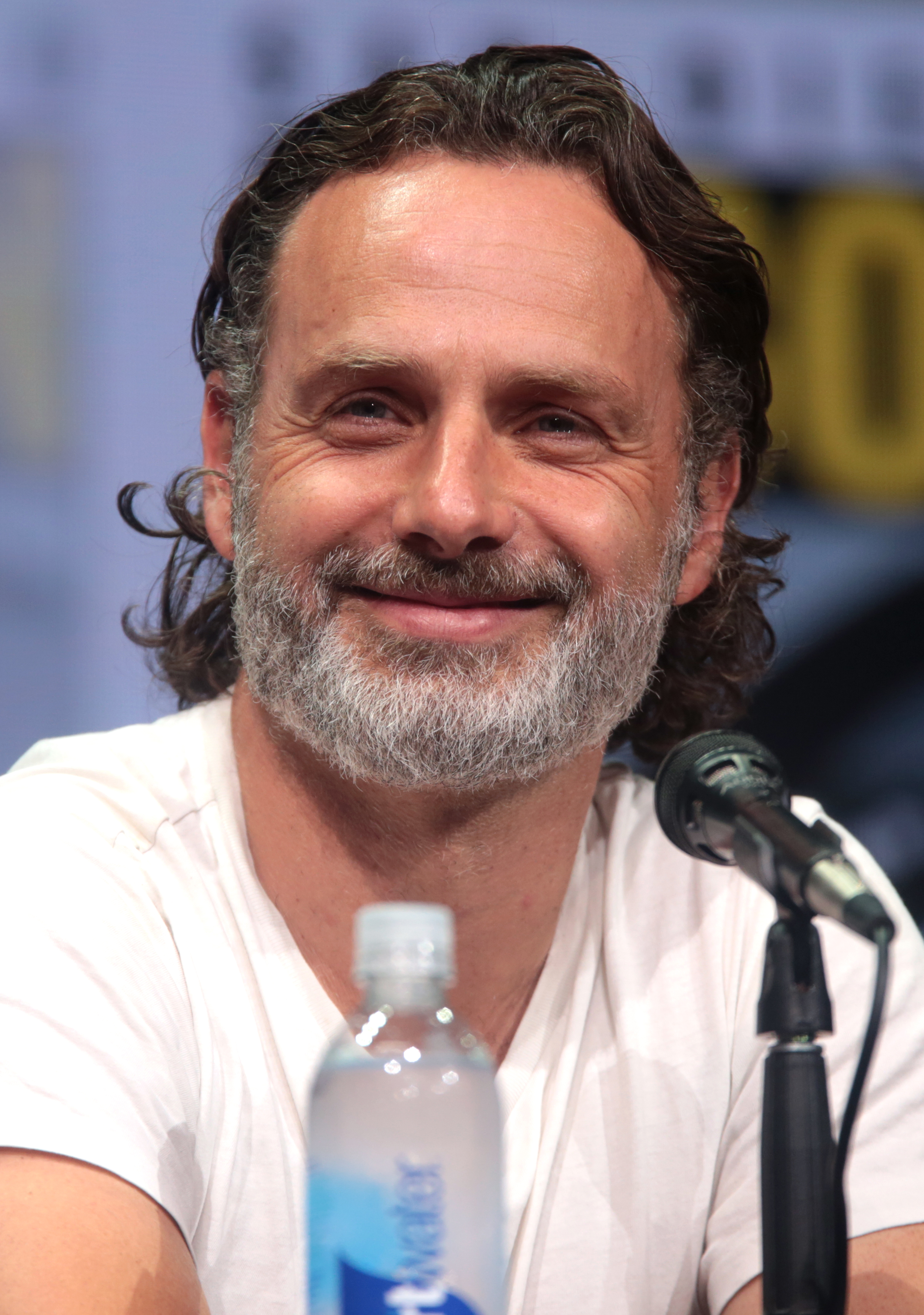

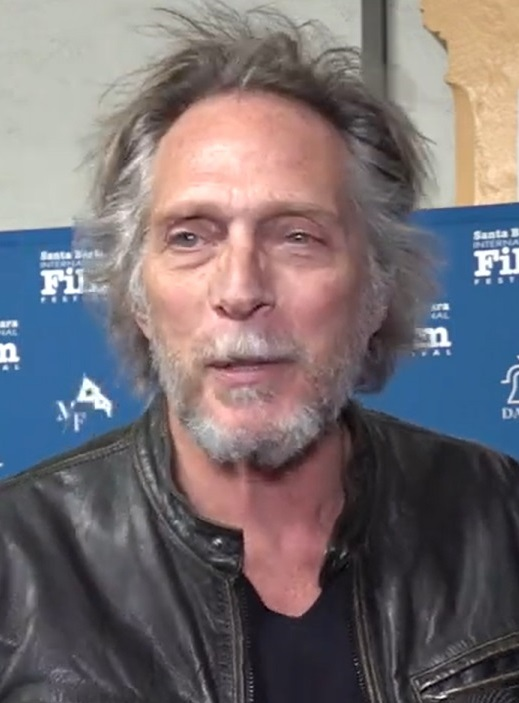

=== 1990s ===
Year	Actor	Television Program	Network	Character
1996 **(23rd)**	**Kyle Chandler**	**Early Edition**	**CBS**	**Gary Hobson**
1996 **(23rd)**	Avery Brooks	Star Trek: Deep Space Nine	Syndicated	Captain Sisko
1996 **(23rd)**	Eric Close	Dark Skies	NBC	John Loengard
1996 **(23rd)**	David Duchovny	The X-Files	Fox	Fox Mulder
1996 **(23rd)**	Lance Henriksen	Millennium	Fox	Frank Black
1996 **(23rd)**	Paul McGann	Doctor Who	Fox	The Doctor
1997 **(24th)**	**Steven Weber**	**The Shining**	**ABC**	**John "Jack" Torrance**
1997 **(24th)**	Richard Dean Anderson	Stargate SG-1	Showtime	Colonel Jack O'Neill
1997 **(24th)**	Nicholas Brendon	Buffy the Vampire Slayer	The WB	Xander Harris
1997 **(24th)**	John Corbett	The Visitor	Fox	Adam MacArthur
1997 **(24th)**	David Duchovny	The X-Files	Fox	Fox Mulder
1997 **(24th)**	Michael T. Weiss	The Pretender	NBC	Jarod
1998 **(25th)**	**Richard Dean Anderson**	**Stargate SG-1**	**Showtime**	**Colonel Jack O'Neill**
1998 **(25th)**	Bruce Boxleitner	Babylon 5	TNT	President John Sheridan
1998 **(25th)**	Nicholas Brendon	Buffy the Vampire Slayer	The WB	Xander Harris
1998 **(25th)**	David Duchovny	The X-Files	Fox	Fox Mulder
1998 **(25th)**	Lance Henriksen	Millennium	Fox	Frank Black
1998 **(25th)**	Jonathan LaPaglia	Seven Days	UPN	Lt. Frank Parker
1999 **(26th)**	**David Boreanaz**	**Angel**	**The WB**	**Angel**
1999 **(26th)**	Richard Dean Anderson	Stargate SG-1	Showtime	Colonel Jack O'Neill
1999 **(26th)**	Jason Behr	Roswell	The WB	Max Evans
1999 **(26th)**	Ben Browder	Farscape	Sci-Fi	John Crichton
1999 **(26th)**	Eric Close	Now and Again	CBS	Michael Wiseman
1999 **(26th)**	Patrick Stewart	A Christmas Carol	TNT	Ebenezer Scrooge

=== 2000s ===
Year	Actor	Television Program	Network	Character
2000 **(27th)**	**Robert Patrick**	**The X-Files**	**Fox**	**John Doggett**
2000 **(27th)**	Richard Dean Anderson	Stargate SG-1	Showtime	Colonel Jack O'Neill
2000 **(27th)**	Jason Behr	Roswell	The WB	Max Evans
2000 **(27th)**	David Boreanaz	Angel	The WB	Angel
2000 **(27th)**	Ben Browder	Farscape	Sci-Fi	John Crichton
2000 **(27th)**	Kevin Sorbo	Andromeda	Syndicated	Captain Dylan Hunt
2001 **(28th)**	**Ben Browder**	**Farscape**	**Sci-Fi**	**John Crichton**
2001 **(28th)**	Richard Dean Anderson	Stargate SG-1	Showtime	Colonel Jack O'Neill
2001 **(28th)**	Scott Bakula	Enterprise	UPN	Captain Jonathan Archer
2001 **(28th)**	David Boreanaz	Angel	The WB	Angel
2001 **(28th)**	Robert Patrick	The X-Files	Fox	John Doggett
2001 **(28th)**	Tom Welling	Smallville	The WB	Clark Kent
2002 **(29th)**	**David Boreanaz**	**Angel**	**The WB**	**Angel**
2002 **(29th)**	Richard Dean Anderson	Stargate SG-1	Sci-Fi	Colonel Jack O'Neill
2002 **(29th)**	Scott Bakula	Enterprise	UPN	Captain Jonathan Archer
2002 **(29th)**	Ben Browder	Farscape	Sci-Fi	John Crichton
2002 **(29th)**	Anthony Michael Hall	The Dead Zone	USA Network	Johnny Smith
2002 **(29th)**	Tom Welling	Smallville	The WB	Clark Kent
2003 **(30th)**	**David Boreanaz**	**Angel**	**The WB**	**Angel**
2003 **(30th)**	Richard Dean Anderson	Stargate SG-1	Sci-Fi	Colonel Jack O'Neill
2003 **(30th)**	Scott Bakula	Star Trek: Enterprise	UPN	Captain Jonathan Archer
2003 **(30th)**	Michael Shanks	Stargate SG-1	Sci-Fi	Dr. Daniel Jackson
2003 **(30th)**	Michael Vartan	Alias	ABC	Michael Vaughn
2003 **(30th)**	Tom Welling	Smallville	The WB	Clark Kent
2004 **(31st)**	**Ben Browder**	**Farscape: The Peacekeeper Wars**	**Sci-Fi**	**John Crichton**
2004 **(31st)**	Richard Dean Anderson	Stargate SG-1	Sci-Fi	Brigadier General Jack O'Neill
2004 **(31st)**	Matthew Fox	Lost	ABC	Jack Shephard
2004 **(31st)**	Julian McMahon	Nip/Tuck	FX	Dr. Christian Troy
2004 **(31st)**	Tom Welling	Smallville	The WB	Clark Kent
2004 **(31st)**	Noah Wyle	The Librarian: Quest for the Spear	TNT	Flynn Carsen
2005 **(32nd)**	**Matthew Fox**	**Lost**	**ABC**	**Jack Shephard**
2005 **(32nd)**	Ben Browder	Stargate SG-1	Sci-Fi	Lt. Colonel Cameron Mitchell
2005 **(32nd)**	William Fichtner	Invasion	ABC	Sheriff Tom Underlay
2005 **(32nd)**	Julian McMahon	Nip/Tuck	FX	Dr. Christian Troy
2005 **(32nd)**	Wentworth Miller	Prison Break	Fox	Michael Scofield
2005 **(32nd)**	Tom Welling	Smallville	The WB	Clark Kent
2006 **(33rd)**	**Michael C. Hall**	**Dexter**	**Showtime**	**Dexter Morgan**
2006 **(33rd)**	Matt Dallas	Kyle XY	ABC Family	Kyle Trager
2006 **(33rd)**	Matthew Fox	Lost	ABC	Jack Shephard
2006 **(33rd)**	Edward James Olmos	Battlestar Galactica	Sci-Fi	Admiral William Adama
2006 **(33rd)**	Kiefer Sutherland	24	Fox	Jack Bauer
2006 **(33rd)**	Noah Wyle	The Librarian: Return to King Solomon's Mines	TNT	Flynn Carsen
2007 **(34th)**	**Matthew Fox**	**Lost**	**ABC**	**Jack Shephard**
2007 **(34th)**	Matt Dallas	Kyle XY	ABC Family	Kyle Trager
2007 **(34th)**	Michael C. Hall	Dexter	Showtime	Dexter Morgan
2007 **(34th)**	Kevin McKidd	Journeyman	NBC	Dan Vasser
2007 **(34th)**	Edward James Olmos	Battlestar Galactica	Sci-Fi	Admiral William Adama
2007 **(34th)**	Lee Pace	Pushing Daisies	ABC	Ned
2008 **(35th)**	**Edward James Olmos**	**Battlestar Galactica**	**Sci-Fi**	**Admiral William Adama**
2008 **(35th)**	Bryan Cranston	Breaking Bad	AMC	Walter White
2008 **(35th)**	Matthew Fox	Lost	ABC	Jack Shephard
2008 **(35th)**	Michael C. Hall	Dexter	Showtime	Dexter Morgan
2008 **(35th)**	Timothy Hutton	Leverage	TNT	Nathan Ford
2008 **(35th)**	Noah Wyle	The Librarian: Curse of the Judas Chalice	TNT	Flynn Carsen
2009 **(36th)**	**Josh Holloway**	**Lost**	**ABC**	**James "Sawyer" Ford**
2009 **(36th)**	Bryan Cranston	Breaking Bad	AMC	Walter White
2009 **(36th)**	Matthew Fox	Lost	ABC	Jack Shephard
2009 **(36th)**	Michael C. Hall	Dexter	Showtime	Dexter Morgan
2009 **(36th)**	Zachary Levi	Chuck	NBC	Chuck Bartowski
2009 **(36th)**	Stephen Moyer	True Blood	HBO	Bill Compton
2009 **(36th)**	David Tennant	Doctor Who	BBC America	The Doctor

=== 2010s ===
Year	Actor	Television Program	Network	Character
2010 **(37th)**	**Stephen Moyer**	**True Blood**	**HBO**	**Bill Compton**
2010 **(37th)**	Bryan Cranston	Breaking Bad	AMC	Walter White
2010 **(37th)**	Matthew Fox	Lost	ABC	Jack Shephard
2010 **(37th)**	Michael C. Hall	Dexter	Showtime	Dexter Morgan
2010 **(37th)**	Timothy Hutton	Leverage	TNT	Nathan Ford
2010 **(37th)**	Andrew Lincoln	The Walking Dead	AMC	Rick Grimes
2011 **(38th)**	**Bryan Cranston**	**Breaking Bad**	**AMC**	**Walter White**
2011 **(38th)**	Sean Bean	Game of Thrones	HBO	Eddard "Ned" Stark
2011 **(38th)**	Michael C. Hall	Dexter	Showtime	Dexter Morgan
2011 **(38th)**	Timothy Hutton	Leverage	TNT	Nathan Ford
2011 **(38th)**	Dylan McDermott	American Horror Story	FX	Ben Harmon
2011 **(38th)**	Noah Wyle	Falling Skies	TNT	Tom Mason
2012 **(39th)**	**Kevin Bacon**	**The Following**	**Fox**	**Ryan Hardy**
2012 **(39th)**	**Bryan Cranston**	**Breaking Bad**	**AMC**	**Walter White**
2012 **(39th)**	Billy Burke	Revolution	NBC	Miles Matheson
2012 **(39th)**	Michael C. Hall	Dexter	Showtime	Dexter Morgan
2012 **(39th)**	Timothy Hutton	Leverage	TNT	Nathan Ford
2012 **(39th)**	Joshua Jackson	Fringe	Fox	Peter Bishop
2012 **(39th)**	Andrew Lincoln	The Walking Dead	AMC	Rick Grimes
2013 **(40th)**	**Mads Mikkelsen**	**Hannibal**	**NBC**	**Dr. Hannibal Lecter**
2013 **(40th)**	Kevin Bacon	The Following	Fox	Ryan Hardy
2013 **(40th)**	Bryan Cranston	Breaking Bad	AMC	Walter White
2013 **(40th)**	Hugh Dancy	Hannibal	NBC	Will Graham
2013 **(40th)**	Freddie Highmore	Bates Motel	A&E	Norman Bates
2013 **(40th)**	James Spader	The Blacklist	NBC	Raymond "Red" Reddington
2013 **(40th)**	Noah Wyle	Falling Skies	TNT	Tom Mason
2014 **(41st)**	**Hugh Dancy**	**Hannibal**	**NBC**	**Will Graham**
2014 **(41st)**	**Andrew Lincoln**	**The Walking Dead**	**AMC**	**Rick Grimes**
2014 **(41st)**	Grant Gustin	The Flash	The CW	Barry Allen / Flash
2014 **(41st)**	Tobias Menzies	Outlander	Starz	Frank Randall / Jack Randall
2014 **(41st)**	Mads Mikkelsen	Hannibal	NBC	Dr. Hannibal Lecter
2014 **(41st)**	Noah Wyle	Falling Skies	TNT	Tom Mason
2015 **(42nd)**	**Bruce Campbell**	**Ash vs Evil Dead**	**Starz**	**Ash Williams**
2015 **(42nd)**	Charlie Cox	Daredevil	Netflix	Daredevil
2015 **(42nd)**	Matt Dillon	Wayward Pines	Fox	Ethan Burke
2015 **(42nd)**	David Duchovny	The X-Files	Fox	Fox Mulder
2015 **(42nd)**	Grant Gustin	The Flash	The CW	Barry Allen / Flash
2015 **(42nd)**	Sam Heughan	Outlander	Starz	Jamie Fraser
2015 **(42nd)**	Andrew Lincoln	The Walking Dead	AMC	Rick Grimes
2015 **(42nd)**	Mads Mikkelsen	Hannibal	NBC	Dr. Hannibal Lecter
2016 **(43rd)**	**Andrew Lincoln**	**The Walking Dead**	**AMC**	**Rick Grimes**
2016 **(43rd)**	Bruce Campbell	Ash vs Evil Dead	Starz	Ash Williams
2016 **(43rd)**	Mike Colter	Luke Cage	Netflix	Luke Cage
2016 **(43rd)**	Charlie Cox	Daredevil	Netflix	Matt Murdock / Daredevil
2016 **(43rd)**	Grant Gustin	The Flash	The CW	Barry Allen / Flash
2016 **(43rd)**	Sam Heughan	Outlander	Starz	James "Jamie" Fraser
2016 **(43rd)**	Freddie Highmore	Bates Motel	A&E	Norman Bates
2017 **(44th)**	**Kyle MacLachlan**	**Twin Peaks: The Return**	**Showtime**	**Dale Cooper**
2017 **(44th)**	Jon Bernthal	The Punisher	Netflix	Frank Castle / Punisher
2017 **(44th)**	Bruce Campbell	Ash vs Evil Dead	Starz	Ash Williams
2017 **(44th)**	Sam Heughan	Outlander	Starz	Jamie Fraser
2017 **(44th)**	Jason Isaacs	Star Trek: Discovery	CBS All Access	Captain Gabriel Lorca
2017 **(44th)**	Andrew Lincoln	The Walking Dead	AMC	Rick Grimes
2017 **(44th)**	Seth MacFarlane	The Orville	Fox	Ed Mercer
2017 **(44th)**	Ricky Whittle	American Gods	Starz	Shadow Moon
2018/2019 **(45th)**	**Sam Heughan**	**Outlander**	**Starz**	**Jamie Fraser**
2018/2019 **(45th)**	Grant Gustin	The Flash	The CW	Barry Allen / Flash
2018/2019 **(45th)**	Kit Harington	Game of Thrones	HBO	Jon Snow
2018/2019 **(45th)**	Andrew Lincoln	The Walking Dead	AMC	Rick Grimes
2018/2019 **(45th)**	Seth MacFarlane	The Orville	Fox	Ed Mercer
2018/2019 **(45th)**	Bill Pullman	The Sinner	USA Network	Harry Ambrose
2018/2019 **(45th)**	Jeffrey Wright	Westworld	HBO	Bernard Lowe
2019/2020 **(46th)**	**Patrick Stewart**	**Star Trek: Picard**	**CBS All Access**	**Jean-Luc Picard**
2019/2020 **(46th)**	Henry Cavill	The Witcher	Netflix	Geralt of Rivia
2019/2020 **(46th)**	Mike Colter	Evil	CBS	David Acosta
2019/2020 **(46th)**	Grant Gustin	The Flash	The CW	Barry Allen / Flash
2019/2020 **(46th)**	Sam Heughan	Outlander	Starz	Jamie Fraser
2019/2020 **(46th)**	Jonathan Majors	Lovecraft Country	HBO	Atticus "Tic" Freeman
2019/2020 **(46th)**	Bob Odenkirk	Better Call Saul	AMC	Jimmy McGill / Saul Goodman

=== 2020s ===
Year	Actor	Television Program	Network	Character
2021/2022 **(50th)**	Network/Cable			
2021/2022 **(50th)**	**Bob Odenkirk**	**Better Call Saul**	**AMC**	**Saul Goodman**
2021/2022 **(50th)**	Colman Domingo	Fear the Walking Dead	AMC	Victor Strand
2021/2022 **(50th)**	Chiwetel Ejiofor	The Man Who Fell to Earth	Showtime	Faraday
2021/2022 **(50th)**	Michael C. Hall	Dexter: New Blood	Showtime	Dexter Morgan
2021/2022 **(50th)**	Sam Heughan	Outlander	Starz	Jamie Fraser
2021/2022 **(50th)**	Tyler Hoechlin	Superman & Lois	The CW	Clark Kent / Superman
2021/2022 **(50th)**	Harold Perrineau	From	Epix	Boyd Stevens
2021/2022 **(50th)**	Streaming			
2021/2022 **(50th)**	**Oscar Isaac**	**Moon Knight**	**Disney+**	**Marc Spector / Moon Knight**
2021/2022 **(50th)**	Tom Hiddleston	Loki	Disney+	Loki
2021/2022 **(50th)**	Anthony Mackie	The Falcon and the Winter Soldier	Disney+	Sam Wilson / Falcon
2021/2022 **(50th)**	Ewan McGregor	Obi-Wan Kenobi	Disney+	Obi-Wan Kenobi
2021/2022 **(50th)**	Anson Mount	Star Trek: Strange New Worlds	Paramount+	Christopher Pike
2021/2022 **(50th)**	Adam Scott	Severance	Apple TV+	Mark Scout
2021/2022 **(50th)**	Antony Starr	The Boys	Amazon Prime Video	Homelander
2022/2023 **(51st)**	**Patrick Stewart**	**Star Trek: Picard**	**Paramount+**	**Jean-Luc Picard**
2022/2023 **(51st)**	Sam Heughan	Outlander	Starz	Jamie Fraser
2022/2023 **(51st)**	Tyler Hoechlin	Superman & Lois	The CW	Clark Kent / Superman
2022/2023 **(51st)**	Diego Luna	Andor	Disney+	Cassian Andor
2022/2023 **(51st)**	Anson Mount	Star Trek: Strange New Worlds	Paramount+	Christopher Pike
2022/2023 **(51st)**	Pedro Pascal	The Last of Us	HBO	Joel Miller
2022/2023 **(51st)**	Harold Perrineau	From	MGM+	Boyd Stevens
2023/2024 **(52nd)**	**Colin Farrell**	**The Penguin**	**Max**	**Oswald "Oz" Cobb / The Penguin**
2023/2024 **(52nd)**	Walton Goggins	Fallout	Amazon Prime Video	The Ghoul / Cooper Howard
2023/2024 **(52nd)**	Jon Hamm	Fargo	FX	Sheriff Roy Tillman
2023/2024 **(52nd)**	Andrew Lincoln	The Walking Dead: The Ones Who Live	AMC	Rick Grimes
2023/2024 **(52nd)**	Harold Perrineau	From	MGM+	Boyd Stevens
2023/2024 **(52nd)**	Norman Reedus	The Walking Dead: Daryl Dixon	AMC	Daryl Dixon
2023/2024 **(52nd)**	Kurt Russell and Wyatt Russell	Monarch: Legacy of Monsters	Apple TV+	Lee Shaw
2024/2025 **(53rd)**	**Diego Luna**	**Andor**	**Disney+**	**Cassian Andor**
2024/2025 **(53rd)**	Sterling K. Brown	Paradise	Hulu	Xavier Collins
2024/2025 **(53rd)**	John Cena	Peacemaker	HBO Max	Chris Smith / Peacemaker
2024/2025 **(53rd)**	Michael C. Hall	Dexter: Resurrection	Paramount+	Dexter Morgan
2024/2025 **(53rd)**	Sam Heughan	Outlander	Starz	Jamie Fraser
2024/2025 **(53rd)**	Norman Reedus	The Walking Dead: Daryl Dixon	AMC	Daryl Dixon
2024/2025 **(53rd)**	Adam Scott	Severance	Apple TV+	Mark Scout

== Multiple nominations ==
8 nominations

- Richard Dean Anderson
- Michael C. Hall

7 nominations

- Matthew Fox
- Andrew Lincoln

6 nominations

- Ben Browder
- Bryan Cranston
- Sam Heughan
- Noah Wyle

5 nominations

- David Boreanaz
- Grant Gustin
- Tom Welling

4 nominations

- David Duchovny
- Timothy Hutton

3 nominations

- Scott Bakula
- Bruce Campbell
- Mads Mikkelsen
- Edward James Olmos

2 nominations

- Kevin Bacon
- Jason Behr
- Nicholas Brendon
- Eric Close
- Mike Colter
- Charlie Cox
- Matt Dallas
- Hugh Dancy
- Lance Henriksen
- Freddie Highmore
- Seth MacFarlane
- Julian McMahon
- Stephen Moyer
- Bob Odenkirk
- Patrick Stewart

== Multiple wins ==
3 wins

- David Boreanaz (2 consecutive)

2 wins

- Ben Browder
- Bryan Cranston (consecutive)
- Matthew Fox
- Andrew Lincoln
- Patrick Stewart

== See also ==
- Saturn Award for Best Actor in Streaming Presentation
