= 34th Saturn Awards =

US film and television award ceremony

- Date: June 24, 2008
- Site: Los Angeles, California, U.S.

Highlights
- Most awards: Enchanted (3)
- Most nominations: 300 (10)

The 34th Saturn Awards, honoring the best in science fiction, fantasy and horror film and television in 2007 were presented on June 24, 2008 in Universal City Hilton Hotel in Los Angeles, California.

Below is a complete list of nominees and winners. Winners are highlighted in boldface.

== Winners and nominees ==
=== Film ===
Best Science Fiction Film	Best Fantasy Film
**Cloverfield**; Fantastic Four: Rise of the Silver Surfer; I Am Legend; The Last Mimzy; Sunshine; Transformers	**Enchanted**; The Golden Compass; Harry Potter and the Order of the Phoenix; Pirates of the Caribbean: At World's End; Spider-Man 3; Stardust
Best Horror Film	Best Action or Adventure Film
**Sweeney Todd: The Demon Barber of Fleet Street**; 1408; 30 Days of Night; Ghost Rider; Grindhouse; The Mist	**300**; 3:10 To Yuma; The Bourne Ultimatum; Live Free or Die Hard; No Country for Old Men; There Will Be Blood; Zodiac
Best Animated Film	Best International Film
**Ratatouille**; Beowulf; Meet The Robinsons; Shrek the Third; The Simpsons Movie; Surf's Up	**Eastern Promises**; Black Book; Day Watch; Goya's Ghosts; The Orphanage; Sleuth
Best Actor	Best Actress
**Will Smith – I Am Legend as Dr. Robert Neville**; Gerard Butler – 300 as King Leonidas; John Cusack – 1408 as Mike Enslin; Daniel Day-Lewis – There Will Be Blood as Daniel Plainview; Johnny Depp – Sweeney Todd: The Demon Barber of Fleet Street as Sweeney Todd; Viggo Mortensen – Eastern Promises as Nikolai Luzhin	**Amy Adams – Enchanted as Giselle**; Helena Bonham Carter – Sweeney Todd: The Demon Barber of Fleet Street as Nellie Lovett; Ashley Judd – Bug as Agnes White; Belén Rueda – The Orphanage as Laura García Rodríguez; Carice van Houten – Black Book as Rachel Stein / Ellis de Vries; Naomi Watts – Eastern Promises as Anna Khitrova
Best Supporting Actor	Best Supporting Actress
**Javier Bardem – No Country for Old Men as Anton Chigurh**; Ben Foster – 3:10 to Yuma as Charlie Prince; James Franco – Spider-Man 3 as Harry Osborn; Justin Long – Live Free or Die Hard as Matthew Farrell; Alan Rickman – Sweeney Todd: The Demon Barber of Fleet Street as Judge Turpin; David Wenham – 300 as Dilios	**Marcia Gay Harden – The Mist as Mrs. Carmody**; Lizzy Caplan – Cloverfield as Marlena Diamond; Lena Headey – 300 as Queen Gorgo; Rose McGowan – Grindhouse as Cherry Darling; Michelle Pfeiffer – Stardust as Lamia; Imelda Staunton – Harry Potter and the Order of the Phoenix as Dolores Umbridge
Best Performance by a Younger Actor	Best Director
**Freddie Highmore – August Rush as Evan Taylor / August Rush**; Alex Etel – The Water Horse: Legend of the Deep as Angus MacMorrow; Josh Hutcherson – Bridge to Terabithia as Jesse "Jess" Aarons; Daniel Radcliffe – Harry Potter and the Order of the Phoenix as Harry Potter; Dakota Blue Richards – The Golden Compass as Lyra Belacqua; Rhiannon Leigh Wryn – The Last Mimzy as Emma Wilder	**Zack Snyder – 300**; Tim Burton – Sweeney Todd: The Demon Barber of Fleet Street; Frank Darabont – The Mist; Paul Greengrass – The Bourne Ultimatum; Sam Raimi – Spider-Man 3; David Yates – Harry Potter and the Order of the Phoenix
Best Writing	Best Music
**Brad Bird – Ratatouille**; Roger Avary, Neil Gaiman – Beowulf; Joel Coen, Ethan Coen – No Country for Old Men; Michael Goldenberg – Harry Potter and the Order of the Phoenix; Michael B. Gordon, Zack Snyder, Kurt Johnstad – 300; John Logan – Sweeney Todd: The Demon Barber of Fleet Street	**Alan Menken – Enchanted**; Tyler Bates – 300; Jonny Greenwood – There Will Be Blood; Nicholas Hooper – Harry Potter and the Order of the Phoenix; Mark Mancina – August Rush; John Powell – The Bourne Ultimatum
Best Costume	Best Make-Up
**Colleen Atwood – Sweeney Todd: The Demon Barber of Fleet Street**; Ruth Myers- The Golden Compass; Penny Rose – Pirates of the Caribbean: At World's End; Sammy Sheldon – Stardust; Jany Temime – Harry Potter and the Order of the Phoenix; Michael Wilkinson – 300	**Ve Neill, Martin Samuel – Pirates of the Caribbean: At World's End**; Howard Berger, Greg Nicotero, Jake Garber – Grindhouse: "Planet Terror"; Nick Dudman, Amanda Knight – Harry Potter and the Order of the Phoenix; Davina Lamont, Gino Acevedo – 30 Days of Night; Peter Owen, Ivana Primorac – Sweeney Todd: The Demon Barber of Fleet Street; Shaun Smith, Mark Rappaport, Scott Wheeler – 300
Best Special Effects
**Scott Farrar, Scott Benza, Russell Earl, John Frazier – Transformers**; Tim Burke, John Richardson, Paul J. Franklin, Greg Butler – Harry Potter and the Order of the Phoenix; Michael L. Fink, Bill Westenhofer, Ben Morris, Trevor Wood – The Golden Compass; John Knoll, Hal T. Hickel, Charles Gibson, John Frazier – Pirates of the Caribbean: At World's End; Scott Stokdyk, Peter Nofz, Spencer Cook, John Frazier – Spider-Man 3; Chris Watts, Grant Freckelton, Derek Wentworth, Daniel Leduc – 300

=== Television ===
==== Programs ====
Best Network Television Series	Best Syndicated/Cable Television Series
**Lost (ABC)**; Heroes (NBC); Journeyman (NBC); Pushing Daisies (ABC); Supernatural (The CW); Terminator: The Sarah Connor Chronicles (Fox)	**Dexter (Showtime)**; Battlestar Galactica (Sci-Fi); The Closer (TNT); Kyle XY (ABC Family); Saving Grace (TNT); Stargate SG-1 (Sci-Fi)
Best Television Presentation	Best International Series
**Family Guy: "Blue Harvest"** (Fox); Battlestar Galactica: Razor (Sci-Fi); The Company (TNT); Fallen (ABC Family); Masters of Science Fiction (ABC); Shrek the Halls (ABC); Tin Man (Sci-Fi)	**Doctor Who (BBC)**; Cape Wrath (Channel 4); Jekyll (BBC One); Life on Mars (BBC One); Robin Hood (BBC One); Torchwood (BBC Three)

Note: The category Best International Series was omitted from the Saturn Awards press release as issued on June 24, 2008, but was added to a corrected press release and website update on June 26.

==== Acting ====
Best Actor on Television	Best Actress on Television
**Matthew Fox – Lost (ABC) as Jack Shephard**; Matt Dallas – Kyle XY (ABC Family) as Kyle; Michael C. Hall – Dexter (Showtime) as Dexter Morgan; Kevin McKidd – Journeyman (NBC) as Dan Vasser; Edward James Olmos – Battlestar Galactica (Sci-Fi) as William Adama; Lee Pace – Pushing Daisies (ABC) as Ned	**Jennifer Love Hewitt – Ghost Whisperer (CBS) as Melinda Gordon**; Anna Friel – Pushing Daisies (ABC) as Chuck Charles; Lena Headey – Terminator: The Sarah Connor Chronicles (Fox) as Sarah Connor; Holly Hunter – Saving Grace (TNT) as Grace Hanadarko; Evangeline Lilly – Lost (ABC) as Kate Austen; Kyra Sedgwick – The Closer (TNT) as Brenda Leigh Johnson
Best Supporting Actor on Television	Best Supporting Actress on Television
**Michael Emerson – Lost (ABC) as Ben Linus**; Greg Grunberg – Heroes (NBC) as Matt Parkman; Josh Holloway – Lost (ABC) as James "Sawyer" Ford; Erik King – Dexter (Showtime) as James Doakes; Terry O'Quinn – Lost (ABC) as John Locke; Masi Oka – Heroes (NBC) as Hiro Nakamura	**Summer Glau – Terminator: The Sarah Connor Chronicles (Fox) as Cameron** (tie); **Elizabeth Mitchell – Lost (ABC) as Juliet Burke** (tie); Jaimie Alexander – Kyle XY (ABC Family) as Jessi; Jennifer Carpenter – Dexter (Showtime) as Debra Morgan; Jaime Murray – Dexter (Showtime) as Lila West; Hayden Panettiere – Heroes (NBC) as Claire Bennet

=== DVD ===
Best DVD Release	Best Special Edition DVD Release
**The Cabinet of Dr. Caligari**; Behind the Mask: The Rise of Leslie Vernon; Driftwood; The Man from Earth; The Nines; White Noise 2: The Light	**Blade Runner: 5-Disc Ultimate Collector's Edition**; Big: Extended Edition; Close Encounters of the Third Kind: 30th Anniversary Edition Blu-ray; Death Proof: Extended and Unrated; Pan's Labyrinth: Platinum Series; Troy: Director's Cut – Ultimate Collector's Edition
Best Classic Film DVD Release	Best DVD Movie Collection
**The Monster Squad**; Alligator; The Dark Crystal; Face/Off; Flash Gordon; Witchfinder General	The **Mario Bava** Collection; The Godzilla Collection; The Sergio Leone Anthology; The Sonny Chiba Collection; Stanley Kubrick: Warner Home Video Directors Series; Vincent Price: MGM Screen Legends Collection
Best DVD Television Release	Best Retro Television Series on DVD
**Heroes: Season 1**; Eureka: Season 1; Hustle: Seasons 2 & 3; Lost: Season 3; Spooks: Volumes 4 & 5; Planet Earth: The Complete BBC Series	**Twin Peaks: The Definitive Gold Box Edition**; Great Performances: "Count Dracula" – The Complete BBC Mini-Series; Land of the Giants: The Complete Series; Mission: Impossible: Seasons 2 & 3; The Wild Wild West: Seasons 2 & 3; The Young Indiana Jones Chronicles Volume 1: The Early Years

== Special awards ==
=== The George Pal Memorial Award ===
- Guillermo del Toro

=== The Special Achievement Award ===
- Tim & Donna Lucas

=== The Service Award ===
- Fred Barton

=== Life Career Award ===
- Robert Halmi, Sr. and Robert Halmi, Jr.

=== Filmmakers Showcase Award ===
- Matt Reeves for Cloverfield.
