= List of Argentine films of 1958 =

Index of list of Argentine films in the year 1958

A list of films produced in Argentina in 1958:

Argentine films of 1958
Title	Director	Release	Genre
A – D
Alto Paraná	Catrano Catrani	18 September	
Amor prohibido	Luis César Amadori	16 January	
Amor se dice cantando	Miguel Morayta Martínez	26 June	
El ángel de España	Enrique Carreras	17 July	
Las apariencias engañan	Carlos Rinaldi	5 June	
Del cuplé al tango	Julio Saraceni	15 October	
De Londres llegó un tutor	Enrique Carreras	25 December	
Demasiado jóvenes	Leopoldo Torres Ríos	13 March	
Detrás de un largo muro	Lucas Demare	3 July	
Los dioses ajenos	Román Viñoly Barreto	24 June	
Dos basuras	Kurt Land	2 May	
E – P
El festín de Satanás	Ralph Pappier	30 January	
Hay que bañar al nene	Edgardo Togni	12 June	
La hermosa mentira	Julio Saraceni	20 March	
El Hombre que hizo el milagro	Luis Sandrini	3 July	
Isla brava	Mario Soffici	4 September	
El jefe	Fernando Ayala	23 October	
Livets vår	Arne Mattsson	6 February	
Luces de candilejas	Enrique Carreras	11 September	
Mientras haya un circo	Carlos Borcosque	11 September	
La morocha	Ralph Pappier	30 January	
Pobres habrá siempre	Carlos Borcosque	27 November	
El primer beso	Enrique Carreras	16 May	
Procesado 1040	Rubén W. Cavallotti	4 September	
R – Z
Rosaura a las diez	Mario Soffici	6 March	
Sección desaparecidos	Pierre Chenal	24 April	
El secuestrador	Leopoldo Torre Nilsson	25 September	
Sin familia	Armando Bó	4 December	
Socios para la aventura	Miguel Morayta Martínez	10 April	
Spring of Life	Arne Mattsson	6 February	Drama
El trueno entre las hojas	Armando Bó	2 October	
Una cita con la vida	Hugo del Carril	24 April	
Un centavo de mujer	Román Viñoly Barreto	6 February	
La venenosa	Miguel Morayta Martínez	30 October	

== External links and references ==
- Argentine films of 1958 at the Internet Movie Database
