= The Drummer of Tacuari =

- Directed by: Carlos F. Borcosque
- Written by: Hugo Mac Dougall
- Produced by: Emelco
- Starring: Juan Carlos Barbieri; Francisco Martínez Allende; Ricardo Canales; Norma Jiménez
- Cinematography: Humberto Peruzzi
- Music by: Juan Elhert
- Release date: 6 July 1948
- Running time: 78 minutes
- Country: Argentina
- Language: Spanish

The Drummer of Tacuari (Spanish: El tambor de Tacuarí) is a 1948 Argentine historical drama film of the classical era of Argentine cinema, directed by Carlos F. Borcosque and written by Hugo Mac Dougall. It was premiered on July 6, 1948.

The film's plot takes place shortly after the May Revolution, when a young man leaves his realist uncle and becomes a drummer for the revolutionary army.

== Cast ==
- Juan Carlos Barbieri
- Francisco Martínez Allende
- Ricardo Canales
- Norma Giménez
- Leticia Scury
- Homero Cárpena
- Cirilo Etulain
- Manolo Díaz
- Julián Bourges
- Jorge Villoldo
- Ada Cornaro
- Mario Vanarelli
- Félix Gil
- Raúl Miller
- Héctor Rodríguez
- Francisco Gada
- Ricardo Trigo
- Miguel Abeledo
- Omar Nardi
- José Castro
- Francisco Audenino
- Carlos Castro Madero
- Iván Grondona
- Roberto Torres
- Mario Pocoví
