= Norma Giménez =

Argentine actress

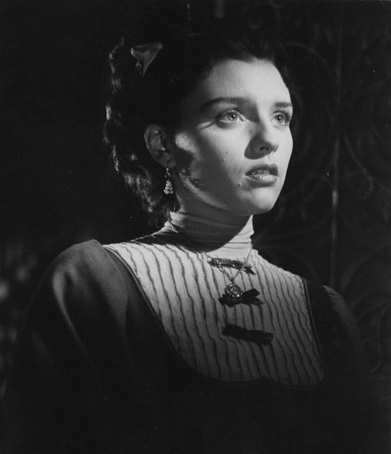
- Giménez in 1952
- Born: Norma Elizabeth del Carmen Giménez; 11 June 1930; Olivos, Argentina
- Died: 21 September 1957 (aged 27); Salta, Argentina
- Occupation: Actress
- Years active: 1947–1957

Norma Giménez (11 June 1930 – 21 September 1957) was an Argentine stage and film actress.

By 1957, Giménez had appeared in 24 films. At the age of 27 she committed suicide by throwing herself under a train. The reasons for killing herself are unclear, although she was possibly distressed because her lover Juan Carlos Barbieri had left her for another woman, the actress Inés Moreno.

== Selected filmography ==
- From Man to Man (1949)
- Valentina (1950)
- Don't Ever Open That Door (1952)
- Spring of Life (1957)

== Bibliography ==
- Insaurralde, Andrés. Manuel Romero. Centro Editor de América Latina, 1994.
