= Two Thousand Dollars for Coyote =

1966 film by León Klimovsky, José María Elorrieta

- Directed by: León Klimovsky
- Screenplay by: Manuel Sabares
- Starring: James Philbrook; Nuria Torray; Perla Cristal; Mariano Vidal Molina
- Release date: 1966
- Country: Italy
- Language: Italian

Two Thousand Dollars For Coyote (also known as Django cacciatore di taglie) is a 1966 Spaghetti Western directed by León Klimovsky.

== Plot ==
Sam Foster, a bounty hunter, is on the trail of a gang of outlaws who have persuaded a youth, Jimmy, to help them rob the town bank. When the outlaws head for Mexico, Sam has to convince Jimmy to turn against the outlaws and recover the loot.

== Cast ==
- James Philbrook as Sam Foster
- Nuria Torray as Mary Patterson
- Perla Cristal as Rita
- Vidal Molina as Sonora
- Alfonso Rojas as Sheriff
- Guillermo Méndez as Lester
- Rafael Vaquero as Hombre de Sonora
- Jose L. Lluch as Ricardo
- Antonio Moreno as Jeremy
- Lola Lemos as Jeremy's Sister
- Rafael F. Rosas as Charlie Foster
- José Sancho as Ayudante del Sheriff
- José Miguel Ariza
- Julio P. Tabernero as Jimmy Patterson
- Aldo Berti
- Rafael Luis Calvo as White Feather
- Jonathan Daly
