= Bendita seas =

- Directed by: Luis Mottura
- Written by: Eliseo Montaine and Maria Luz Regas
- Edited by: Antonio Rampoldi
- Release date: 1956
- Running time: 85 minutos
- Country: Argentina
- Language: Spanish

Bendita seas is a 1956 Argentine film. A drama directed by Luis Mottura, script by Eliseo Montaine and María Luz Regás based on the theater play by Alberto Novión. The movie was released on March 8, 1956.

== Premise ==
A woman cannot reveal to one of her children that she is their mother.

== Cast ==
- Mecha Ortiz as Doña Maria
- Enrique Serrano as Aniceto
- Guillermo Battaglia as Francisco Aguelles
- Domingo Alzugaray as Enrique
- Luis Medina Castro as Javier
- José de Angelis as Don Pedro
