= The Year of the Rabbit =

- Screen-capture of film
- Spanish: El Año del Conejo
- Directed by: Fernando Ayala
- Written by: Oscar Viale
- Produced by: Héctor Olivera
- Starring: Luisina Brando; Federico Luppi; Gerardo Romano; Ulises Dumont; Juan Carlos Dual
- Cinematography: Leonardo Rodríguez Solís
- Edited by: Eduardo López
- Music by: Leo Sujatovich
- Production company: Aries Cinematográfica Argentina
- Release date: 1987
- Running time: 103 minutes
- Country: Argentina
- Language: Spanish

The Year of the Rabbit (Spanish: El año del conejo) is a 1987 Argentine comedy drama film directed by Fernando Ayala and written by Oscar Viale. Starring Gerardo Romano, the film had its premiere on August 13, 1987.

== Synopsis ==
In his mid-50s, a man reassesses his family and work life.

== Main cast ==
- Luisina Brando
- Federico Luppi
- Gerardo Romano
- Ulises Dumont
- Juan Carlos Dual
- Ludovica Squirru
- Katja Alemann
- Andrea Barbieri
- Raúl Rizzo
- Emilio Vidal

== Other cast ==
- Luis Alday
- Martín Andrade
- Olga Bruno
- Ana María Colombo
- Adrián Cuneo
- Manuel Cuneo
- Cristina Czetto
- Sandra Domínguez
- Héctor Ezcurra
- Daniel Galarza
- Maruja Pibernat
- Nilda Raggi
- Felisa Rocha
- Enrique Sabattini
- Carlos Santamaría
- Carlos Silva
- Alejandra Sirlin
- Jorge Varas
- Hebe Castro Zinny
