= Un centavo de mujer =

1958 film

- Directed by: Román Viñoly Barreto
- Written by: Hugo Moser
- Produced by: Luis Giudici
- Cinematography: Aníbal González Paz
- Edited by: Nello Melli
- Music by: Tito Ribero
- Release date: 6 February 1958
- Running time: 86 minute
- Country: Argentina
- Language: Spanish

Un centavo de mujer is a 1958 Argentine romantic drama film directed by Román Viñoly Barreto. It stars Georges Rivière (Jorge Rivier), Elsa Daniel and Nelly Panizza. The film is about a teenage girl who has the desire to pursue a relationship with an older, drunken French actor.

== Cast ==
- Francisco Audenino
- Ricardo Castro Ríos
- Doris Coll
- Elsa Daniel
- Mónica Linares
- André Norevó
- Nelly Panizza
- Georges Rivière
- Raúl Rossi
- Mariano Vidal Molina
- Aída Villadeamigo

== Gallery ==
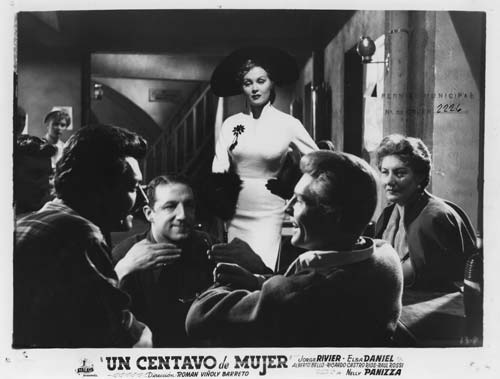

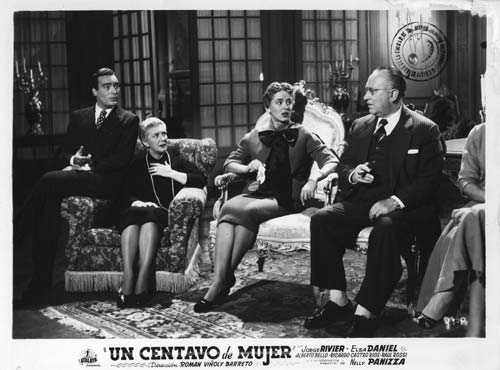

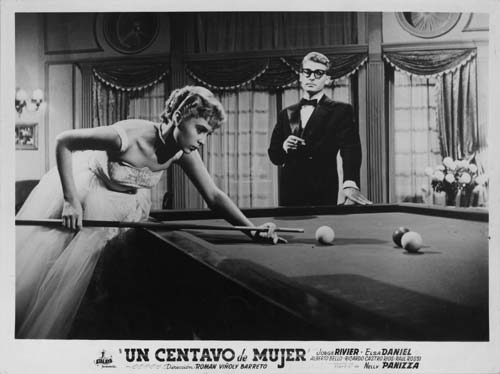
