= Adelaida Soler =

Argentine film, stage, radio, television and theater actress

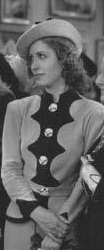
Adelaida Soler (1939)

Adelaide Soler was an Argentine film, stage, radio, television and theater actress during the golden age of Argentina cinema. She was born in Buenos Aires and died there in 1976.

== Filmography ==
- 1937: Melodías porteñas
- 1939: Giácomo
- 1939: Ambición
- 1940: De México llegó el amor
- 1954: El Calavera
- 1954: Un Hombre cualquiera
- 1958: La venenosa
- 1971: El caradura y la millonaria
