= Looking After Jo Jo =

- Genre: Thriller; Drama
- Created by: Frank Deasy
- Directed by: John Mackenzie
- Starring: Robert Carlyle as Jo Jo McCann; Kevin McKidd as Basil; Ewan Stewart
- Country of origin: Scotland
- Original language: English
- No. of series: 1
- No. of episodes: 4

Production
- Production company: BBC Scotland

Original release
- Network: BBC Two
- Release: 12 January – 2 February 1998

Looking After Jo Jo is a 1998 BBC Scotland four-part television drama starring Robert Carlyle.

John Joe "Jo Jo" McCann is petty thief turned drug dealer in 1980's Edinburgh, surviving in a bleak housing estate and aspiring to the trappings of a successful criminal. Unfortunately for him, and for most of the other characters in the mini-series, it is a time of heroin addiction and AIDS.

It is filmed and set in and around the North Sighthill housing estate, with several scenes also filmed in Niddrie.

== Cast and characters ==
- Robert Carlyle as John Joe "Jo Jo" McCann; a petty thief turned drug dealer. Jo Jo is troubled by memories of his past, in particular his father's death.
- Kevin McKidd as Basil; One of Jo Jo's crew, who experiments early on with Heroin and leads the group to its sales.
- Jenny McCrindle as Lorraine; Jo Jo's love interest, and a Marilyn Monroe lookalike.
- Ewan Stewart as Charlie McCann; Jo Jo's criminal uncle.
- Aline Mowat as Christine; as Charlie McCann's partner, bar worker and drug pusher.

== Episodes ==
- Episode 1: Steal the Herd

In 1982, Jo Jo McCann always manages to stay one step ahead of the police. Family loyalties are tested to the limit by his determination to set up a crime empire in opposition to his uncle, the local underworld kingpin who has a few ruthless ideas of his own.

- Episode 2: Working Week

The attraction of making big money dealing heroin proves too much for recently acquitted Jo Jo, who jumps on the bandwagon at the first opportunity. But evil undercurrents of violence and addiction soon surface as he becomes consumed by Edinburgh's drug culture, prompting him to think carefully about his future.

- Episode 3: Sink the Belgrano

It is 1983, Money begins to roll in at long last as Jo Jo's heroin business takes off in earnest. But what he doesn't take into account, is that his dodgy dealings are about to destroy everything he loves.

- Episode 4: When Love Goes Wrong

The walls of Jo Jo's world come tumbling down as he finally uncovers the truth about his father's death. Meanwhile, the community spirit of the estate collapses under the pressure of Sarah's imprisonment, Charlie McCann's murder and a rampant Aids epidemic. Last in series.

== Critical reception ==
The Guardian wrote "Despite a cortege-paced narrative, Looking After Jo Jo has enough wit and moral backbone to take its place alongside other recent gems in Scottish drama."

== DVD release ==
Looking After Jo Jo was released on VHS by the BBC in 1999 after its initial showing on BBC Two in 1998. In 2015, Simply Media released it on DVD.
