= Domingo Alzugaray =

Argentine-born Brazilian actor and journalist

Domingo Cecílio Alzugaray (22 November 1932 – 24 July 2017) was an Argentine-born Brazilian actor and journalist who was the founding editor of ISTOÉ, established in 1976.

== Selected filmography ==
- Bendita seas (1956)
- Pobres habrá siempre (1958)
- Three Loves in Rio (1959)
- Con el más puro amor (1966)
