= Juan Carlos Barbieri =

Argentine stage and film actor

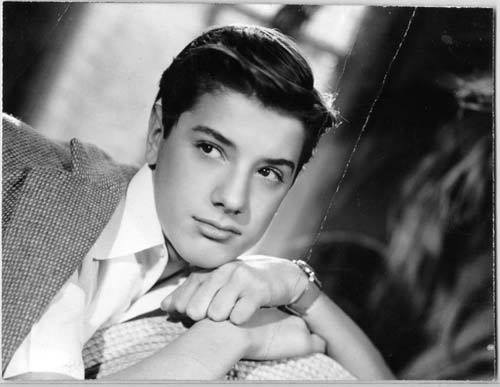
- Born: October 8, 1932; Buenos Aires, Argentina
- Died: December 11, 1996 (aged 64); Los Angeles, California, United States
- Occupation: Actor
- Years active: 1945–1972 (film)
- Spouse: Inés Moreno (m. 1957–1965)
- Partner: Norma Giménez (before 1957)
- Children: Andrea Barbieri

Juan Carlos Barbieri (October 8, 1932 – December 11, 1996) was an Argentine stage and film actor. He was married to the actress Inés Moreno from 1957 until 1965, with whom he had a daughter Andrea Barbieri. He had earlier been in a relationship with Norma Giménez.

== Selected filmography ==
- The Drummer of Tacuarí (1954)

== Bibliography ==
- Pellettieri, Osvaldo. De Eduardo De Filippo a Tita Merello. Editorial Galerna, 2003.
