= Mariano Vidal Molina =

Argentine actor

- Born: Mariano Rudolfo Vidal Molina; October 23, 1925; Buenos Aires, Argentina
- Died: February 20, 1996 (aged 70); Madrid, Spain
- Occupation: Actor

Mariano Vidal Molina (23 October 1925 – 20 February 1996) was an Argentine actor.

He appeared along Antonio Parra and Gustavo Re in The Corruption of Chris Miller (1973), by Juan Antonio Bardem, Carola de día, Carola de noche (1969), by Jaime de Armiñán, along Frank Braña, Charito Tejero, José Canalejas, Tomás Blanco and Jorge Vico in Secret of Captain O'Hara, by Arturo Ruiz Castillo.

== Filmography ==
- Solo o en compañía de otros (1991) as Javier Uztueta
- Hot Blood (1989) as Manucé
- Howl of the Devil (1988) as Guardia Civil
- The Last of Philip Banter (1986) as Maitre 2
- Romanza final (1986)
- Guerra sucia (1984) as Mr. Fox
- Tunka el guerrero (1984) as Gorgo
- Story of O: Chapter 2 (1984)
- La casada divertida (1981)
- Matad al buitre (1981) as Foster
- Black Jack (1981)
- Los cántabros (1980) as Salvio
- Una sombra en la oscuridad (1979)
- Juventud drogada (1977) as Inspector de policía
- Potato Fritz (1976)
- Las protegidas (1975) as Dimas
- A Dragonfly for Each Corpse (1975) as Police Commissioner
- Los locos del oro negro (1975) as Owen
- Bienvenido, Mister Krif (1975)
- Valley of the Dancing Widows (1975) as Jim Nancy
- Devil's Possessed (1974) as Sillé
- Una chica y un señor (1974)
- Ella (Trágica obsesión) (1973)
- Curse of the Devil (1973) as Roulka
- Sexy Cat (1973) as Teniente Cole
- The Corruption of Chris Miller (1973) as Ernesto
- The Mysterious Island (1973) as Bob Harvey
- Charlots Go to Spain (1972)
- Escalofrío diabólico (1972) as Alex
- Four Candles for Garringo (1971) as Rogers
- Zorro the Invincible (1971)
- Reverend's Colt (1970) as Billy
- Scream of the Demon Lover (1970) as Inspector
- More Dollars for the MacGregors (1970) as Joe Saxon
- Awkward Hands (1970) as Pistolero
- Robin Hood: the Invincible Archer (1970)
- Un dólar y una tumba (1970) as Ed Gray
- El tigre del Kyber (1970) as Maggiore Castlewright
- Las joyas del diablo (1969) as Manolo
- Carola de día, Carola de noche (1969) as Mauricio
- White Comanche (1968) as Gen. Garcia
- The Young Rebel (1967) as Diego de Urbina
- El halcón de Castilla (1967) as Don Galcerán de Guzman
- Gentleman Killer (1967) as Captain Clay Reeves
- Target Frankie (1967) as Tom Fenner
- El padre Manolo (1967)
- Secret of Captain O'Hara (1966) as Comandante Brush
- Two Thousand Dollars for Coyote (1966) as Sonora
- Tormenta sobre el Pacífico (1966) as André Chamblais
- Five for Revenge (1966) as Alan
- The Sea Pirate (1966) as André Chamblais
- Seven Hours of Gunfire (1965) as Frank North
- 100 Horsemen (1964)
- Doomed Fort (1964) as Joffren
- Apache Fury (1964) as Burt Kaplan
- Operación G (1966)
- El romance de un gaucho (1961)
- Un centavo de mujer (1958)
- La venenosa (1958)
- Amor prohibido (1958)
- Las campanas de Teresa (1957)
- El juramento de Lagardere (1955)
- La noche de Venus (1955) as Cameo
- Mujeres casadas (1954)
- La calle del pecado (1954)
- El pecado más lindo del mundo (1953)
- El vampiro negro (1953) as Lange

=== TV series ===
- Crónicas del mal (1992) as Gangster
- Historias del otro lado (1991) as Falso Dr. Ponce
- La huella del crimen (1991) as Miralles
- Brigada central (1989) as Belardi
- El gran secreto (1989) as Parrish
- Curro Jiménez (1977) as Comandante Francés
- Los libros (1974) as Alvar Fañez de Minaya
- L'île mystérieuse (1973) as Bob Harvey
