= Pobres habrá siempre =

1958 film

- Directed by: Carlos F. Borcosque
- Written by: Carlos F. Borcosque
- Starring: Domingo Alzugaray; Norberto Aroldi
- Cinematography: Andrés Martorell De Llanza
- Edited by: Gerardo Rinaldi, Antonio Ripoll
- Release date: 27 November 1958
- Running time: 85 minutes
- Country: Argentina
- Language: Spanish

Pobres habrá siempre is a 1958 Argentine film directed by Carlos F. Borcosque.

== Cast ==
- Daira Ceriani ...Gisela Mazeiskas
- Domingo Alzugaray ...Héctor José Olmos
- Nieves Ibar ...Carola
- Isidro Fernán Valdez ...Glaco Chuno
- Norberto Aroldi ...Carabajal
- Jorge Rivera López ...Eduardo Sandoval
- Jorge Villalba ...Gregorio Olmos
- Darío Perkins
- Guillermo Bredeston ...Manuel
- María Luisa Goldoni
- Hugo Llanos ...Laurencio Monteros
- Andrés Balmelli
- Ernesto Nogués ...Rafael Suárez
- Elisa Ladow ...Operaria
- Roberto Bordoni ...Stanley
