= La Noche de Venus =

- Directed by: Virgilio Muguerza
- Written by: Domingo Di Núbila
- Starring: Ivana Kislinger; Julián Bourges; José Cibrián; Manuel Perales; Alberto de Mendoza; Susana Campos; Mario Lozano; Mariano Vidal Molina
- Release date: 1955
- Running time: 90 minute
- Country: Argentina
- Language: Spanish

La Noche de Venus is a 1955 Argentine film.

== Cast ==
- Ivana Kislinger
- Julián Bourges
- José Cibrián
- Manuel Perales
- Alberto de Mendoza
- Susana Campos
- Mario Lozano
- Mariano Vidal Molina
