= La venenosa =

- Directed by: Miguel Morayta
- Screenplay by: Miguel Morayta
- Based on: El caballero audaz by José María Carretero
- Produced by: Emilio Gómez Muriel
- Starring: Ana Luisa Peluffo; Jorge Salcedo; Fina Basser; Adelaida Soler
- Cinematography: Humberto Peruzzi
- Edited by: Narciso Gonzalez; Vicente Castagno
- Music by: Juan Ehlert
- Distributed by: Corsa Films S.A.
- Release date: October 30, 1958
- Running time: 86 min
- Country: Argentina
- Language: Spanish

La venenosa is a 1958 Argentine-Mexican drama film, produced by Emilio Gómez Muriel, written and directed by Miguel Morayta, and starring Ana Luisa Peluffo, Jorge Salcedo, Fina Basser and Adelaida Soler.

== Cast ==
- Ana Luisa Peluffo
- Jorge Salcedo
- Fernando Soto "Mantequilla"
- Fina Basser
- Ramón Gay
- Margarita Corona
- Mariano Vidal Molina
- Mario Barrofio
- Héctor Armendáriz
- Francisco Audenino
- Andrés Lazlo
- Raúl Russo
- Strano Santos
- Nicolás Taricano
