= Andrea Barbieri =

Argentine television and film actress

- Born: 17 April 1965 (age 61); Buenos Aires, Argentina
- Other name: Andrea Barbieri Moreno
- Occupation: Actress
- Years active: 1983–present
- Parents: Juan Carlos Barbieri (father); Inés Moreno (mother)

Andrea Barbieri (17 April 1965) is an Argentine television and film actress. She is the daughter of the actors Juan Carlos Barbieri and Inés Moreno.

== Filmography ==
- 1985: Domingos de Pacheco (TV Series)
- 1984: La pobre Clara (TV Serie, 39 episodes)
- 1984: Cuatro hombres para Eva (TV Series, 29 episodes)
- 1984: Pasajeros de una pesadilla
- 1984: Los tigres de la memoria
- 1985: Sólo un hombre (TV Series, 18 episodes)
- 1985: El pulpo negro (TV Mini-Series, 13 episodes)
- 1985: Duro como la roca... frágil como el cristal (TV Series, 39 episodes)
- 1985: Duro como la roca... frágil como el cristal (TV Series, 39 episodes)
- 1985: Barbarian Queen
- 1987: Me niego perderte (TV Series, 120 episodes)
- 1987: El año del conejo
- 1988: El mago (TV Serie, 13 episodes)
- 1989: The Strange Lady (TV Series, 120 episodes)
- 1988-1989:Mi nombre es Coraje (TV Series 120 episodes)
- 1989: Los otros y nosotros (TV Series, 89 episodes
- 1992: La elegida (TV Series, 29 episodes)
- 1994: Unconquerable Heart (TV Series, 4 episodes)
- 1994-1995: Nueve lunas (TV Series, 29 episodes)
- 1995: Little Women Forever (TV Series, 87 episodes)
- 1996: Ha-Mosad (TV Series, 39 episodes)
- 1997: The Sign (TV Mini Series, 3 episodes)
- 1998: La nocturna (TV Series, 69 episodes)
- 1998: Chiquititas (TV Series, 1 episode)
- 1999: Mamitas (TV Series, 28 episodes)
- 2000: Primicias (TV Series, 30 episodes)
- 2001: Savage Attraction (TV Series, 49 episodes)
- 2002: Ciudad de pobres corazones (TV Series, 2 episodes)
- 2002: Pasajero 10542
- 2005: Sex Stories of Ordinary People (TV Series, 1 episode)
- 2006: Un Cortado Historias de Café (TV Series, 1 episodes)
- 2006: Juanita, la soltera (TV Series, 108 episodes)
- 2007: Killer Women (TV Series, 1 episode)
- 2012-2013: Mi amor, mi amor (TV Series 88 episodes)

== Bibliography ==
- Jorge Nielsen & Hugo F. Vega. La magia de la televisión argentina: cierta historia documentada, Volume 4. Ediciones del Jilguero, 2004.
