= Livia Beale =

- Journeyman character
- First appearance: A Love of a Lifetime
- Last appearance: Perfidia
- Created by: Kevin Falls
- Portrayed by: Moon Bloodgood

In-universe information
- Gender: female
- Title: Deputy District Attorney of San Francisco
- Occupation: Lawyer
- Spouse: Henry
- Relatives: Dan Vasser (ex-fiancee)
- Nationality: American

Olivia Beale is a fictional character from the American drama series Journeyman. She is played by Moon Bloodgood.

Beale was born in 1923 and became a foster child. Before 1948, Beale began to time travel into the future where she helped change the outcome of people's lives for the better. At some point she was sent to the late 1980s where she remained, apparently without a mission. Taking advantage of her situation, Beale worked at the Luna café as a waitress during the day, and went to Law school at night. By 1998 she was the Deputy District Attorney of San Francisco and engaged to Dan Vasser. In 1999, Beale was sent back to 1948 after the plane she was flying on crashed into the ocean. This led to her being presumed dead by Dan and everyone else she left behind.

When Dan begins time traveling at the start of the series, Beale joins him in the time periods to which he travels and often gives advice and help, normally arguing with Dan about the dangers of "going off mission". During Christmas 1948 she accepted the marriage proposal of Henry, played by John Dennis. Little is known about Henry, other than Livia has told him about her time traveling.

As the series continues, and as she learns what happened to Dan after she left him, Beale realizes that Dan was the target of her extended jump, and that her mission was to get Dan together with his wife, Katie (which happened because of Livia's supposed death).

It is said (mainly by fansites) that Beale died in the early 1990s, which was when Evan Pattison started traveling.

Livia did not die in the 1990s. The show's creator, Kevin Falls, in an interview after Journeyman was cancelled, outlined some of the stories that would have happened had the show continued. One of those was that an elderly Livia was still alive in 2008 and would meet up with Dan.
