= Hay que bañar al nene =

- Directed by: Edgardo Togni
- Produced by: Abel Santacruz
- Cinematography: Pablo Tabernero
- Edited by: Jacinto Cascales
- Music by: Alberto Ginastera
- Release date: 1958
- Running time: 80 minute
- Country: Argentina
- Language: Spanish

Hay que bañar al nene is a 1958 Argentine film.
