= Lucho Avilés =

Uruguayan-born Argentine journalist and television presenter (1938–2019)

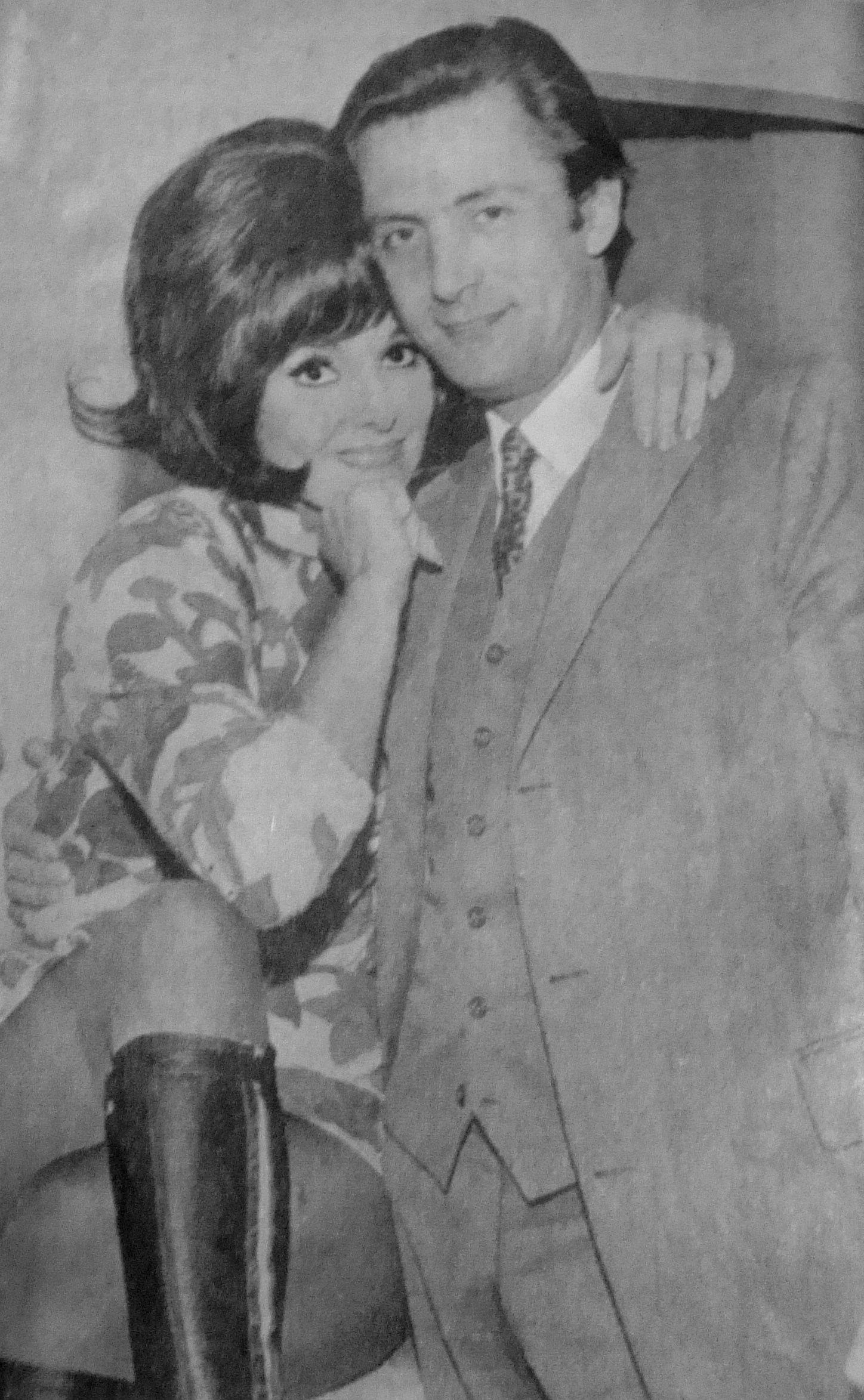
Lucho Aviles, 1972

Luis César "Lucho" Avilés (30 April 1938 — 8 June 2019) was a Uruguayan-born Argentine journalist and television presenter.

== Early life ==
He was born in Montevideo, Uruguay in 1938. In 1965 he moved to Argentina and became an Argentine citizen. Despite rumours that he had died in November 2010, he was still alive. He died on 8 June 2019 at the age of 81.

His first work in Argentina was for the Crónica newspaper.
