= Isla brava =

- Directed by: Mario Soffici
- Written by: José Ramón Luna, Mario Soffici
- Starring: Mirko Álvarez; Alberto Argibay; Juan Buryúa Rey
- Release date: 1958
- Running time: 80 minutes
- Country: Argentina
- Language: Spanish

Isla brava is a 1958 Argentine film directed by Mario Soffici and starring Elsa Daniel.

== Cast ==
- Mirko Álvarez
- Alberto Argibay
- Juan Buryúa Rey
- Miguel Caiazzo
- Fernando Campos
- Elsa Daniel
- José De Angelis
- Floren Delbene
- Carlos Escobares
- Alfonso Estela
- Carmen Giménez .
- Tito Grassi
- Eduardo de Labar
- Claudio Lucero
- Mariángeles
- Paquita Más
- Inés Moreno
- Frank Nelson
- José Olivero
- Oscar Orlegui
- Martín Resta
- Félix Rivero
- María Luisa Robledo
- Luis Rodrigo
- Martha Roldán
- Enrique San Miguel
- Alfredo Santacruz
- Mario Soffici
