= Dan Vasser =

- Journeyman character
- First appearance: A Love of a Lifetime
- Last appearance: Perfidia
- Created by: Kevin Falls
- Portrayed by: Kevin McKidd

In-universe information
- Gender: male
- Occupation: Reporter
- Spouse: Katie Vasser (Wife)
- Children: Zack Vasser (Son)
- Relatives: Jack Vasser (Older Brother)
- Nationality: American

Daniel "Dan" Vasser is a fictional character on the American drama Journeyman. He is played by Scottish actor Kevin McKidd.

Vasser is the protagonist of the series, who begins to time travel, unable to stop or control the jumps. At the start of the series, Vasser is a reporter for the fictional newspaper the San Francisco Register, and is happily married to Katie Vasser née Barron of seven years with whom he has a son, Zack.

Vasser was born in San Francisco, California to Frank Vasser, a photographer, who left his wife and family on Christmas Eve 1979 when Dan was seven. About ten years before the start of the series, Vasser was engaged to Deputy District Attorney Olivia "Livia" Beale, who he shared an apartment with. At the same time Katie was dating Vasser's brother, Jack. When Livia was believed to have been killed in an airplane crash, Vasser developed a gambling problem. It was at this point that Katie (who had recently split-up with Jack) and Vasser became romantically involved.

Vasser begins to involuntarily time travel on his seventh wedding anniversary, at first thinking he is hallucinating. With every trip he realizes that he is 'traveling' to help change the outcome of people's lives for the better. On his travels, Vasser is helped by Livia, who he initially believes is a ghost. As the series continues he finds out that Livia is in fact a time traveler like him, who was originally from 1948 and returned home just before her plane crashed.
