= Journeyman (TV series) =

Television series

- Genre: Romance; Science fiction
- Created by: Kevin Falls
- Starring: Kevin McKidd; Brian Howe; Gretchen Egolf; Moon Bloodgood; Reed Diamond; Charles Henry Wyson
- Theme music composer: Amanda Ghost; James Dring; Jody Street
- Country of origin: United States
- Original language: English
- No. of seasons: 1
- No. of episodes: 13

Production
- Executive producers: Kevin Falls; Alex Graves
- Running time: 42 minutes
- Production companies: Left Coast Productions; 20th Century Fox Television

Original release
- Network: NBC
- Release: September 24 – December 19, 2007

Journeyman is an American science-fiction romance television series created by Kevin Falls for 20th Century Fox Television which aired on the NBC television network. It starred Kevin McKidd as Dan Vasser, a San Francisco reporter who involuntarily travels through time. Alex Graves, who directed the pilot, and Falls served as executive producers.

The show premiered on September 24, 2007, airing Mondays at 10 p.m. Eastern Time. The initial order from the network was for 13 episodes, all of which were produced prior to the 2007 Writers Guild of America strike. However, the series suffered from low ratings, and NBC canceled it in April 2008. The final episode of Journeyman aired on Wednesday, December 19, 2007.

== Plot ==
The series centers on Dan Vasser, a newspaper reporter living with his wife Katie and young son Zack in San Francisco. For an unknown reason, one day he begins "jumping" backward in time. He soon learns that each series of jumps follows the life of a person whose destiny he is meant to change. Dan's jumping affects his family life and his job, and instills suspicion in his brother Jack, a police detective. While in the past, Dan reconnects with his ex-fiancée, Livia, whom he had believed was killed in a plane crash but who is actually a fellow time traveler.

== Fictional cosmology ==
Dan's temporal displacements, colloquially referred to as "shifts," exhibit an apparent lack of pattern or predictability. Preceding each jump, Dan experiences a sensation in his head that varies in timing, ranging from immediate to several seconds in advance. Initially, these sensations manifested as headaches, although their intensity gradually diminished as the series progressed. It is worth noting that Dan possesses no conscious control over these shifts.

The initial leap thrusts Dan several decades into the past, with subsequent jumps progressively bringing him closer to the present, typically spanning several years per leap. In the series finale, Dan encounters Evan, who discloses his own identity as a fellow traveler, suggesting that Evan, too, has experienced haphazard jumps across various time periods. Livia, another character, also alludes to her own multitude of jumps, albeit distinct from Dan's experiences.

Dan's jumps materialize through the manifestation of a small blue flash and a rippling effect, causing him to seemingly vanish from the present and instantaneously appear in the past. During his absence from the present, the duration of time is unrelated to the period spent in the past. These disappearances and reappearances are seldom witnessed by others. Notably, Dan does not reemerge at the same location he departed from; instead, he materializes in close proximity to the individual he is destined to assist. His jumps predominantly confine him to the San Francisco region, the area of his departure. Initially, upon arrival in the past, Dan remains unconscious. However, as the series progresses, he gains some measure of control over the jumps, evidenced by his ability to sense their onset and walk with the ripples as they occur. Dan actively strives to comprehend the mechanics governing his temporal travels, seeking insights from a physicist who exhibits knowledge of his father's past and speculating about the potential influence of tachyon particles on temporal shifts. It becomes apparent that the scientist is cognizant of Dan's journeys and those undertaken by individuals sharing his peculiar abilities. Furthermore, it is revealed that individuals born around the time of a rare celestial event, the fictitious "Joseph-Lee" comet, possess the capacity for time travel.

Each of Dan's journeys bears an inherent purpose, which may not always be immediately evident to him. Their underlying objective revolves around effecting positive changes in the destinies of specific individuals. Paradoxically, if Dan attempts to manipulate events beyond his designated charge, fate appears to conspire against him. Alterations made by Dan to the timeline reverberate into the present and affect the recollections of its inhabitants. However, his own memories remain unaffected, enabling him to recall events as they originally unfolded prior to his interventions.

Dan is not alone in his temporal voyages. His former fiancée, Livia, presumed dead in a plane crash, actually travels back to her "home time" of 1948 and subsequently jumps forward through time. Dan encounters Livia during his leaps into the past, as she propels herself toward her future to offer guidance and support in his missions. In the episode "Perfidia," it is revealed that at least one other individual, named Evan, also possesses the ability to traverse time. Intriguingly, this person's demise occurs shortly before Dan experiences his initial jump, thereby establishing a cyclical narrative wherein Dan supplants the void left by Evan's absence as a time traveler. At the same time, Dan and Livia intuitively sense that her purpose in accompanying him culminates at that juncture, foreshadowing diminished future encounters between the two.

== Cast and characters ==
- Dan Vasser (played by Kevin McKidd) is a reporter for the fictional newspaper the San Francisco Register. Dan is the main protagonist of the series, who finds himself jumping through time, unable to stop or control the jumps. He has a son, Zack, with his wife of 7 years, Katie — his brother's ex-girlfriend. Dan was previously engaged to Livia Beale before her disappearance and supposed death in a plane crash. Dan is a recovered gambling addict.
- Katie Vasser (played by Gretchen Egolf) is Dan's wife and mother of their son Zack. Initially, she was the only one in the present who knew about her husband's time-traveling. Katie was the long-time girlfriend of Dan's brother Jack. Since their break-up nine years ago, the two have remained somewhat distant, partly because Katie ended up getting pregnant by Dan and they married soon after. Before marrying Dan, Katie was a television reporter. In response to cutbacks at the Register, and Dan's traveling, Katie returns to television to ensure a stable income for the family.
- Olivia "Livia" Beale (played by Moon Bloodgood) is Dan's ex-fiancée who was presumed dead after a plane crash nearly ten years before the start of the series. It is revealed that she is actually a time traveler from 1948 who jumps into the future. After not being able to jump home for an uncertain number of years, she was stuck in Dan's present and adapted to life there, where she began a legal career and fell in love with Dan, only to finally jump back home while on the plane before it crashed. In "Blowback" and in the final episode, "Perfidia", she and Dan speculated that Dan was the target of her extended jump, and that her mission was to get Dan and Katie together (which was arguably a result of her supposed death). For unknown reasons, she now jumps to the same times that Dan visits and offers him advice and assistance in his missions.
- Jack Vasser (played by Reed Diamond) is Dan's brother. Jack, a police detective, is dating Dr. Theresa Sanchez (Lisa Sheridan), but also has feelings for Katie (his ex). Jack forms a number of misconceptions about Dan's disappearances and apparent irresponsibility, refusing to believe his brother when Dan tries to explain the time traveling. Suspecting Dan has perhaps returned to his gambling vice, Jack uses his police resources to investigate Dan's life. Jack is finally convinced of Dan's time traveling when Livia meets with Jack to enlist his help in getting Dan out of a desperate situation.
- Hugh Skillen (played by Brian Howe) is the editor-in-chief of the San Francisco Register and Dan's boss and friend.
- Zack Vasser (played by Charles Henry Wyson) is Dan and Katie's 7-year-old son, who has seen Dan disappear, believing it to be magic. Dan often fears leaving his son, as his father left him when he was Zack's age.

== Main crew ==
Kevin Falls, Alex Graves, Joan Binder Weiss, J.R. Orci, Neal Ahern, Megan Mascena, Matt McGuinness, Paul Redford, David Hyman, Juan Carlos Coto, Tom Szentgyörgyi, Dana Calvo, and Robert J. Ulrich (Casting Director).

== Production ==
Exteriors of the Vasser family home were shot at Foy House, 1337 Carroll Ave., Angelino Heights, Echo Park, Los Angeles. At the end of episode ten the Innes House made famous as Halliwell Manor in the series Charmed can be seen next door to the south-east.

Episodes of the show were made available online, and NBC distributed the pilot on a fall-preview DVD at Blockbuster and other retail video-rental stores.

United Kingdom's Sky One, Australia's Channel Ten, TV3 in New Zealand and Canada's Global network acquired broadcast rights to the series.

When the show was not renewed for a full season, some Journeyman supporters initiated an attempt to revive production of the series by sending boxes of Rice-A-Roni (a product associated with San Francisco) to NBC, echoing the "Nuts" campaign which led to a second season of the CBS series Jericho. Journeyman creator Kevin Falls acknowledged the campaign in his blog, saying "Your fight to save Journeyman has humbled and moved us. I'm certainly not going to tell you to stop now". However, Falls also said that there were long odds against a revival, stating "Journeyman will likely not be getting a back nine order." As of April 2, 2008, the show was confirmed as officially canceled by NBC.

== Episodes ==
No.	Title	Directed by	Written by	Original release date	Prod. code	US viewers (millions)
1	"A Love of a Lifetime"	Alex Graves	Kevin Falls	September 24, 2007	1ANJ79	9.16
Dan Vasser, a San Francisco reporter, finds that he is—seemingly randomly—traveling through time. He travels to 1987 and saves Neal Gaines'(Christopher Warren) by pushing him out of the way of a rail train. When he travels back to the present, he believes it was a hallucination until he finds out that Neal Gaines was real. He then goes back to the past and saves the relationship that Neal Gaines has, in which he gets his girlfriend pregnant, by telling her to keep the baby. Later in the episode, he travels to 1997 on New Year's Eve. During this visit he sees his past fiancee, who died in a plane crash. The first time, he sees her in their old apartment, and the second time, he sees her during his own proposal to her. Later, he saves Neal's wife and son this time, after Neal goes to try and kill them for leaving him. This leads to Neal's son to grow up and save the lives of 6 kids. Realizing that his current wife is about to leave him, in 1997, he goes into the backyard of their future house, and buries a copy of a newspaper from that year, as well as their engagement ring. When he comes back to the present, he digs up the box and shows its contents to her.
2	"Friendly Skies"	Alex Graves	Kevin Falls	October 1, 2007	1ANJ01	8.23
Dan and his wife plan a weekend getaway in Oregon until he is transported back to November 20, 1975 and helps a woman give birth on an airplane. The woman tells him that the baby's father is out of the picture, which she reiterates when Dan again meets her sometime in the early 1980s. Dan meets the woman's now teenaged daughter in 1994 when she finally manages to meet her father. Dan helps her get the courage to speak to her father, but he immediately rejects her. Dan's final visit to 1995 he meets the girl's father on a flight to San Francisco. He is dying from leukemia and needs a bone marrow transplant. Dan finds the daughter and convinces her to meet him at the hospital. She agrees to go and speaks with her father. Dan chats with another young man who also has leukemia. He finally meets the girl in the present time. She tells him that she was not a bone marrow match for her father, but instead for the man Dan met. She is a very good friend of that man and he is a UN relief worker in Darfur.
3	"Game Three"	Alex Graves	Tom Szentgyörgyi	October 8, 2007	1ANJ02	6.94
Instead of going to multiple time periods in one person's life, Dan continues to travel back in time to the same day: the day of the Game Three earthquake on October 17, 1989. Several times during the episode he encounters a suicidal lawyer. The man is deep in debt from a gambling addiction. Dan eventually learns that the man committed suicide two days after the earthquake. Dan confronts the man about his addiction. Dan tells him about his own addiction just as the earthquake occurs. The lawyer is almost killed in a building collapse. The shock of nearly dying gives him a new reason to live. Dan learns in the present time that the lawyer is a major crusader for the wrongly incarcerated. In the present, Dan has a deadline for a major story. His editor is pressuring him to work only on his assignment. Dan decides to help his editor by trying to prevent his editor's sister from dying in the Cypress Viaduct collapse. He fails to prevent her death but learns that the death was the reason that his editor overcame his alcoholism.
4	"The Year of the Rabbit"	Laura Innes	Joan B. Weiss	October 15, 2007	1ANJ03	6.75
Dan wakes up in 1994 finding himself in a wedding rehearsal, soon after he enters a bar where a woman is waiting for a man she met on the internet. He helps her avoid an angry ex-boyfriend. He later discovers that her date married her and she was murdered. He saves her life in 1998. He learns that she later is arrested for murdering her husband. He returns to the same night and takes the ex-boyfriend, who is a cop, to find her. They fail to prevent her from killing her husband but she now has a witness to confirm that it was self-defense. Meanwhile, Dan contacts Professor Elliot Langley (Tom Everett) about tachyon particles. While in the past, he mysteriously receives a phone call on his old cell phone from Doctor Langley.
5	"The Legend of Dylan McCleen"	Allison Liddi	Matt McGuinness	October 22, 2007	1ANJ04	6.06
Dan travels to 1975, where he rescues a man tangled in a parachute before discovering that he is tracking the mysterious Dylan McCleen, a man who hijacked a plane with hundreds of thousands of dollars in ransom money. Dan discovers that McCleen, also known as Army Ranger John Richie, was searching for a Cambodian man whose family had kept him safe during the Vietnam War, and whom Richie intended to repay by using the ill-gotten money to extract his family from Asia.
6	"Keepers"	Andrew Bernstein	Paul Redford	October 29, 2007	1ANJ05	5.75
Dan travels back over time to help two brothers. The older one is initially a problem child, but as Dan progresses through their lives, the older brother becomes responsible and the younger one troubled. The younger brother has become mentally ill and obsessed with time travel. He is an apparent math genius. In the initial history he mails a letter bomb, which Dan is able to avoid happening by going back in time to warn the company that received the letter bomb. Dan and the older brother confront him and he comments that Dan must be a time traveler as he has never aged at any of the times they meet. During this period, Dan and his brother also clash. At the dénouement, however, Dan discovers that his brother was only trying to protect him. He also becomes briefly concerned that his wife may have been rushed into marriage, but his wife expresses no regrets. When speaking to Steven, the younger brother, he is told flatly by Steven that even with tachyons time travel is impossible.
7	"Double Down"	Alex Graves	J. R. Orci	November 5, 2007	1ANJ06	5.13
Katie meets with an old colleague (Don Franklin) to decide if she wants to return to work as a TV journalist. Dan travels back to 1999, protecting a witness in a gang case from being assassinated, putting his own past self in jeopardy in the process. With Livia's help, Dan safeguards his past self from the same gang killers, while struggling to keep the past from changing in order to protect his future with Katie and Zack. In 2007, Jack continues to investigate his brother's mysterious behavior when Zack reveals his parents' stash of "play money". Jack's inquiry piques the interest of an FBI agent (Paul Schulze), who presses for information on the currency's origin.
8	"Winterland"	Helen Shaver	Dana Calvo	November 12, 2007	1ANJ07	6.09
In 2007, Katie helps Dan dispose of Dylan McCleen's money before FBI Agent Richard Garrity (Paul Schulze) serves the Vassers with a search warrant, citing Dan's unexplained disappearance from a commercial airliner. After Dan disappears into the past, Katie discovers an antique photograph that sheds new light on Dan's old flame: Livia is originally from 1948. Dan travels back to November 17, 1973 and, along with Livia, tracks Abigail Armstrong, a college student who leaves home after a falling-out with her mother. Through Dan's intervention in 1974, Abby falls in with a group of hippies who later commit a robbery in which a man is killed, resulting in Abby's incarceration for life. Dan and Livia then travel to the day of the robbery to set history back to rights. When FBI agent Garrity is questioning Dan's brother, a flashback scene is shown from 1995 Dan gave a cab driver a $20 bill dated 2003. The flashback scene shows the cab driver comparing the 2003 bill with the new format to an older bill. The serial number shown on the $20 bill in the flash back is CK45631893B. The FBI agent then reveals the $20 bill that has been in a sealed evidence bag, which has a serial number of EO85644694B. The flashback scene continues, showing Dan's brother chasing him until giving up. The $20 is shown in Dan's brother's hand, serial number CK45631893B. At the end of the episode, Dan's brother buys a drink at a bar, and slides a $20 across the bar to pay for it. The bill has serial number EO85644694B.
9	"Emily"	Frederick King Keller	Juan Carlos Coto	November 19, 2007	1ANJ08	5.61
Dan travels back to 1992 and rescues Emily, a girl who had gone missing and never been found. As Dan tracks Emily through her troubled adolescence, he realizes that rescuing her may have led to the kidnapping and murder of another girl in 2001, and that the same man who kidnapped Emily is likely responsible. Livia warns Dan not to alter history further by attempting to rescue this new victim, but he ignores her advice. In 2007, Katie deals with Zack's misbehavior at Herbert Wells Elementary School, and fears that he may be acting out in response to his father's increasing absences. Jack slowly begins to accept the idea that Dan may, in fact, be traveling through time, and assists his brother in an unofficial investigation into the affairs of Aeden Bennett (Raphael Sbarge).
10	"Blowback"	Karen Gaviola	Kevin Falls	November 26, 2007	1ANJ09	6.05
In 2007, a recently paroled Aeden Bennett attacks Dan Vasser in his home, shooting him moments before Dan travels into the past. With Dan away, Aeden tricks Katie into returning home by posing as a plumber and taking her hostage. Hugh informs Jack that, according to "a source", the FBI is not conducting any open investigations into Dan's activities, implying that Agent Garrity is a rogue operator. Garrity later shows Jack a photograph of Dan prior to his disappearance from Flight 1680, and compares it to a bystander in another photograph of Diana Bloom disembarking her plane after giving birth in 1975; Garrity's statements imply that he knows about Dan's unique ability. Garrity visits Dan's home, where the agent is shot by Bennett. In 1980, Dan finds himself tracking Aeden Bennett as a child locked alone in his home, and attempts to get the 10-year-old to safety. He is stalled when Aeden's father, an abusive police officer, arrives home and terrorizes the boy; after Aeden's father leaves, Dan explains Aeden's future before Livia arrives and helps Dan, whose bleeding has become life-threatening, to safety. Livia travels to 2007 where she explains Dan's predicament to Jack before vanishing again, and Jack finds Dan at the hospital, having recently returned as well. The two race to Katie's aid, and Dan talks Bennett down by invoking Bennett's memory of their encounter in 1980. After Bennett is taken back into custody, Jack comes to accept his brother's peculiarity.
11	"Home By Another Way"	Lesli Linka Glatter	Tom Szentgyörgyi	December 10, 2007	1ANJ10	5.28
Dan travels back to the newspaper's holiday party on December 24, 1979 after Christmas Eve layoffs hit his office. He also runs into his father, Frank Vasser, (Joel Gretsch) in the past and attempts to make his father not leave his family. Dan fails, but is able to make his father explain why he is leaving before he leaves them. Elsewhere, Katie tries to put her traumatizing experience behind her while trying to deal with Jack and Dan's mother. Meanwhile, Jack and Theresa find out that Theresa is pregnant. Theresa also becomes suspicious of Dan, but suspects that he has a mental illness. Jack and Dan's mother and Katie have a heart to heart talk about Dan.
12	"The Hanged Man"	Steven DePaul	Tracy McMillan	December 17, 2007	1ANJ11	4.24
While saving a mother and son (Christopher) from a car accident, Dan drops his digital camera which is later recovered by Christopher. This piece of modern technology in 1984 boosts computing technology far beyond current capabilities, presumably through reverse engineering. Once back in the present, Dan discovers that his computer has a holographic screen, and that he no longer has a son — a consequence of a "nanotech" malfunction at the Register office on the date that Zack had been conceived — but rather a daughter named Caroline. Meanwhile, Jack looks into the life of the rogue FBI agent who was targeting Dan. After resolving the camera issue and saving Christopher's life, the psychic from Dan's alternate present comes into his home, presenting him his "birth chart". She explains that Dan's birthdate — July 6, 1972 — coincides with the passing of the Joseph-Lee Comet, believed by astrologers to have mystic properties, and that the Comet has passed the Earth only twice in the past century; the other passing occurred on Livia's birthday — March 3, 1923. Meanwhile, Jack pulls some strings to dig into Agent Garrity's casefile, and finds an old photograph, taken by Frank Vasser, of a young Dan with Professor Elliot Langley at NASA. When Dan contacts Langley, however, the professor denies knowing him. To be continued...
13	"Perfidia"	Alex Graves	Aeden Babish & Matt McGuinness	December 19, 2007	1ANJ12	4.62
Dan wakes up in a mental institute with a cut on his head. He meets a patient named Evan, who claims to also be a traveler like Dan. Evan says his jumps have stopped because of the sedatives he's given, but wants to get out to meet the love of his life. Dan doesn't quite believe him entirely, but he helps Evan escape using a fight as a distraction. Dan finds out that Evan was killed jaywalking. Meanwhile Katie's sister is dropping hints that she should leave Dan and get her own home. Then, later that day, Dan jumps back into the past with Livia to stop him--Evan--from dying. Evan provides proof that he actually is a traveler, and that the woman he's "stalking" was his wife in an alternate reality. Evan says that his personal life suffered so much because of his traveling that he changed the past by preventing his marriage to spare his wife the misery. Dan and Livia manage to get them together for one salsa dance before Evan collapses and dies. Dan then notes that the date they traveled to is September 2007, just a few months before the present. He then spots himself getting into a cab to jump for the very first time across the street from where Evan has just died. Dan wonders if Evan had to die for him to start traveling. Back in the present, Dan finally meets the Professor Langley. The professor says he is trying to avoid any contact with Dan because of the temptation to force Dan to change the past for his own benefit. He knows what Dan does, having started his studies based on anachronisms like an Incan clay replica of a modern airplane. Back at home, Dan reassures Katie that he'll always come home. Katie wants to see Dan jump, and finally catches a glimpse as he disappears at night.

== Reception ==
The series premiere, "A Love of a Lifetime", was watched by 9.2 million people, and received a 3.5/9 share among adults 18–49 years old. Mike Pearson of the Rocky Mountain News felt that Journeyman cannibalized past television shows Early Edition and Quantum Leap. In his opinion, the second episode was more coherent than the first. Tony Whitt of IfMagazine.com gave "A Love of a Lifetime" an A−, and felt that one aspect of Journeyman that was better than Quantum Leap was its love story. He also liked the acting in "A Love of a Lifetime" and called star McKidd "damn watchable". Karla Peterson of The San Diego Union-Tribune felt that "A Love of a Lifetime" was "a deft mix of supernatural wizardry and grown-up drama".

=== U.S. ratings ===
#	Episode	Air Date	Rating	Share	18–49 (Rating/Share)	Viewers (m)	Weekly Rank
1	"A Love of a Lifetime"	September 24, 2007	5.8	9	3.5/9	9.16	43
2	"Friendly Skies"	October 1, 2007	5.3	9	3.2/8	8.23	50
3	"Game Three"	October 8, 2007	4.4	7	2.9/7	6.94	61
4	"The Year of the Rabbit"	October 15, 2007	4.3	7	2.7/7	6.75	67
5	"The Legend of Dylan McCleen"	October 22, 2007	3.8	6	2.4/6	6.06	72
6	"Keepers"	October 29, 2007	3.7	6	2.2/6	5.75	71
7	"Double Down"	November 5, 2007	3.4	6	2.1/5	5.13	80
8	"Winterland"	November 12, 2007	4.0	7	2.4/6	6.09	70
9	"Emily"	November 19, 2007	3.7	6	2.2/6	5.61	66
10	"Blowback"	November 26, 2007	3.7	6	2.4/6	6.05	68
11	"Home By Another Way"	December 10, 2007	3.5	6	1.7/5	5.28	62
12	"The Hanged Man"	December 17, 2007	3.0	5	1.5/4	4.24	65
13	"Perfidia"	December 19, 2007	3.2	5	1.7/5	4.62	58

== See also ==
Quantum Leap
