= List of American films of 1985 =

This is a list of American films released in 1985.

== Box office ==
The highest-grossing American films released in 1985, by domestic box office gross revenue, are as follows:

Highest-grossing films of 1985
Rank	Title	Distributor	Domestic gross
1	Back to the Future	Universal	$210,609,762
2	Rambo: First Blood Part II	TriStar / Carolco	$150,415,432
3	Rocky IV	MGM	$127,873,716
4	The Color Purple	Warner Bros.	$94,175,854
5	Out of Africa	Universal	$87,071,205
6	Cocoon	20th Century Fox	$76,113,124
7	The Jewel of the Nile	20th Century Fox	$75,973,200
8	Witness	Paramount	$68,706,993
9	The Goonies	Warner Bros.	$61,389,680
10	Spies Like Us	Warner Bros.	$60,088,980

== January–March ==
Opening		Title	Production company	Cast and crew	Ref.
J A N U A R Y	8	The Mutilator	Ocean King Releasing	Buddy Cooper, John S. Douglass (directors); Matt Mitler, Bill Hitchcock, Ruth Martinez, Connie Rogers, Morey Lampley, Frances Raines, Jack Chatham, Bennie Moore, Trace Cooper, Pamela Weddle Cooper	
J A N U A R Y	8	Rockin' Road Trip	Troma Entertainment	William Olsen (director); Leon Rippy, Martin Tucker, Pat Miller, Garth McLean, Katherine Harrison, Leland Gantt, Steve Boles, Margaret Currie	
J A N U A R Y	9	The Plague Dogs	Embassy Pictures / United Artists / Nepenthe Productions / Goldcrest Films	Martin Rosen (director/screenplay); John Hurt, Christopher Benjamin, James Bolam, Nigel Hawthorne, Warren Mitchell, Bernard Hepton, Brian Stirner, Penelope Lee, Geoffrey Matthews, Barbara Leigh-Hunt, John Bennett, John Franklyn-Robbins, Bill Maynard, Malcolm Terris, Judy Geeson, Philip Locke, Brian Spink, Tony Church, Anthony Valentine, William Lucas, Dandy Nichols, Rosemary Leach, Patrick Stewart, Percy Edwards	
J A N U A R Y	11	Too Scared to Scream	The Movie Store	Tony Lo Bianco (director); Mike Connors, Anne Archer, Leon Isaac Kennedy, Ian McShane, Ruth Ford, John Heard, Carrie Nye, Maureen O'Sullivan, Murray Hamilton, Val Avery, Sully Boyar, Ken Norris, Chet Doherty, Karen Rushmore, Rony Clanton, Beeson Carroll, Victoria Bass, Dick Boccelli, Fred Ford, Ernesto Gasco, Adrienne Howard, Yvonne Talton Kersey, Gaetano Lisi, Harry Madsen, John Ring,	
J A N U A R Y	11	Walking the Edge	Empire Pictures	Norbert Meisel (director); Robert Forster, Nancy Kwan, Joe Spinell, A Martinez, James McIntire, Wayne Woodson, Luis Contreras, Russ Courtney, Doug Toby, Phil H. Fravel, Terrence Beasor, Bernard Erhard, James Fitzpatrick, Ivy Bethune, Jackie Giroux, Aarika Wells, Howard Honig, Frankie Hill, Jerry Jones, Leonard D'John, Peter Pan, Jamie V. Arias, Rosa M. Torres, Stan Kamber, Falling Idols	
J A N U A R Y	11	Water	HandMade Films	Dick Clement (director/screenplay); Ian La Frenais, Bill Persky (screenplay); Michael Caine, Valerie Perrine, Brenda Vaccaro, Leonard Rossiter, Billy Connolly, Eric Clapton, George Harrison, Ringo Starr	
J A N U A R Y	13	Gulag	HBO Premiere Films / Lorimar Pictures / MFI Furniture Group	Roger Young (director); Dan Gordon (screenplay); David Keith, Malcolm McDowell, David Suchet, Warren Clarke, John McEnery, Nancy Paul, Brian Pettifer, George Pravda, Eugene Lipinski, Shane Rimmer, Ray Jewers, Bogdan Kominowski	
J A N U A R Y	17	Avenging Angel	New World Pictures	Robert Vincent O'Neil (director); Betsy Russell, Rory Calhoun, Susan Tyrrell, Ossie Davis, Steven M. Porter, Robert F. Lyons, Paul Lambert, Frank Doubleday, Barry Pearl, Ross Hagen	
J A N U A R Y	17	Tuff Turf	New World Pictures	Fritz Kiersch (director); Jette Rinck (screenplay); James Spader, Kim Richards, Paul Mones, Matt Clark, Claudette Nevins, Robert Downey, Olivia Barash, Catya Sassoon, Bill Beyers, Gene Pietragallo, Panchito Gomez, Michael Wyle, Herb Mitchell, Lou Fant, Donald Fullilove, Jered Barclay, Evonne Kezios, Cheryl Ann Clark, Matt Gavin, Chad McCann, Vivian Brown, Ceil Cabot, Donna Fuller, Rosa Sabina Rodriguez, Frank McCarthy, Art Evans, Jeffrey Dawson	
J A N U A R Y	18	Blood Simple	Circle Films / River Road Productions / Foxton Entertainment	Joel Coen (director/screenplay); Ethan Coen (screenplay); John Getz, Frances McDormand, Dan Hedaya, M. Emmet Walsh, Samm-Art Williams, Holly Hunter, Barry Sonnenfeld	
J A N U A R Y	18	The New Kids	Columbia Pictures	Sean S. Cunningham (director); Shannon Presby, Lori Loughlin, James Spader, John Philbin, Eddie Jones, Eric Stoltz, Tom Atkins, David H. MacDonald, Vince Grant, Theron Montgomery, Lucy Martin, Paige Lyn Price, Court Miller, Jean De Baer, Robertson Carricart	
J A N U A R Y	18	That's Dancing!	MGM/UA Entertainment Company	Jack Haley Jr. (director/screenplay); Mikhail Baryshnikov, Ray Bolger, Sammy Davis Jr., Gene Kelly, Liza Minnelli, Tommy Abbott, June Allyson, Ann-Margret, Fred Astaire, Lucille Ball, Jennifer Beals, Busby Berkeley, Eric Blore, Monte Blue, John Brascia, Lucille Bremer, James Cagney, Irene Cara, Leslie Caron, Gower Champion, Marge Champion, Cyd Charisse, Joan Crawford, Dan Dailey, Jacques d'Amboise, Doris Day, Gloria DeHaven, Isadora Duncan, Buddy Ebsen, Taina Elg, Eliot Feld, Margot Fonteyn, Loie Fuller, Clark Gable, Judy Garland, Virginia Gibson, Cary Grant, Jack Haley, Margaret Hamilton, Carol Haney, June Haver, Robert Helpmann, Judy Holliday, José Iturbi, Michael Jackson, Marine Jahan, Van Johnson, Ruby Keeler, Paula Kelly, Michael Kidd, Charles Laskey, Ruta Lee, Vivien Leigh, Bambi Linn, Peter Lorre, Susan Luckey, Shirley MacLaine, Dean Martin, Léonide Massine, Matt Mattox, Joan McCracken, Ray McDonald, Ann Miller, James Mitchell, Ricardo Montalbán, Annabelle Moore, Tony Mordente, George Murphy, Gene Nelson, Julie Newmar, Rudolf Nureyev, Donald O'Connor, Anna Pavlova, Marc Platt, Dick Powell, Eleanor Powell, Jane Powell, Tommy Rall, Debbie Reynolds, Jeff Richards, Chita Rivera, Bill "Bojangles" Robinson, Ginger Rogers, Mickey Rooney, Wini Shaw, Moira Shearer, Frank Sinatra, Red Skelton, Tucker Smith, James Stewart, Lyle Talbot, Russ Tamblyn, Lilyan Tashman, Robert Taylor, Anthony 'Scooter' Teague, Shirley Temple, Tamara Toumanova, John Travolta, Lana Turner, Bobby Van, Vera-Ellen, Ethel Waters, Bobby Watson, Esther Williams, David Winters, Vera Zorina, Vincent Price, Robert Banas	
J A N U A R Y	25	The Falcon and the Snowman	Orion Pictures	John Schlesinger (director); Steven Zaillian (screenplay); Timothy Hutton, Sean Penn, Richard Dysart, Pat Hingle, Lori Singer, Dorian Harewood, Chris Makepeace, Macon McCalman, Joyce Van Patten, Priscilla Pointer, Nicholas Pryor, David Suchet, Boris Leskin, Daniel McDonald, Jennifer Runyon, Art Camacho, Anatoli Davydov, Tom Nolan, Burke Byrnes, Vic Polizos, Drew Snyder, Michael Ironside, Arthur Taxier, Valerie Wildman, Spiro Agnew, Roger Cudney, Robert F. Kennedy, Martin Luther King Jr., John Lennon, Richard Masur, Richard Nixon, John Ratzenberger, Sam Ingraffia, Mady Kaplan, Marvin McIntyre	
J A N U A R Y	25	Fandango	Warner Bros. Pictures / Amblin Entertainment	Kevin Reynolds (director/screenplay); Kevin Costner, Judd Nelson, Sam Robards, Chuck Bush, Brian Cesak, Suzy Amis, E.G. Daily, Glenne Headly, Marvin J. McIntyre, Stanley Grover, Jane A. Johnston	
J A N U A R Y	25	Maria's Lovers	Cannon Films	Andrei Konchalovsky (director/screenplay); Gérard Brach, Paul Zindel, Marjorie David (screenplay); Nastassja Kinski, John Savage, Robert Mitchum, Keith Carradine, Anita Morris, Bud Cort, Vincent Spano, Karen Young, John Goodman, Tracy Nelson, Danton Stone, Elena Koreneva, Anna Thomson, Bill Smitrovich, Lela Ivev, Anton Sipos, Tania Harley, Gary Hileman, Ann Caulfield, Mary Hogan, Eddie Stenfeld, Nardi Novak, Frankie The Dog	
F E B R U A R Y	8	Fantasia (re-issue)	Walt Disney Pictures	Samuel Armstrong, James Algar, Bill Roberts, Paul Satterfield, Ben Sharpsteen, David D. Hand, Hamilton Luske, Jim Handley, Ford Beebe, T. Hee, Norman Ferguson, Wilfred Jackson (director); Leopold Stokowski, Deems Taylor	
F E B R U A R Y	8	Heaven Help Us	Tri-Star Pictures	Michael Dinner (director); Charles Purpura (screenplay); Andrew McCarthy, Mary Stuart Masterson, Kevin Dillon, Malcolm Danare, Kate Reid, Wallace Shawn, John Heard, Donald Sutherland, Jay Patterson, Patrick Dempsey, Stephen Geoffreys, Dana Barron, Yeardley Smith	
F E B R U A R Y	8	Mischief	20th Century Fox	Mel Damski (director); Noel Black (screenplay); Doug McKeon, Catherine Mary Stewart, Kelly Preston, Chris Nash, D.W. Brown, Jami Gertz, Margaret Blye, Graham Jarvis, Terry O'Quinn	
F E B R U A R Y	8	Witness	Paramount Pictures	Peter Weir (director); Earl W. Wallace, William Kelley (screenplay); Harrison Ford, Kelly McGillis, Lukas Haas, Jan Rubeš, Josef Sommer, Alexander Godunov, Danny Glover, Brent Jennings, Patti LuPone, Angus MacInnes, Viggo Mortensen, Frederick Rolf, Timothy Carhart, Richard Chaves, Robert Earl Jones, Sylvia Kauders, John Garson, Ed Crowley, Beverly May	
F E B R U A R Y	15	The Breakfast Club	Universal Pictures	John Hughes (director/screenplay); Emilio Estevez, Paul Gleason, Anthony Michael Hall, Judd Nelson, Molly Ringwald, Ally Sheedy, John Kapelos, Ron Dean	
F E B R U A R Y	15	Fast Forward	Columbia Pictures	Sidney Poitier (director); Timothy March, Richard Wesle (screenplay); John Scott Clough, Don Franklin, Gretchen Palmer, Karen Kopins, Irene Worth, Sam McMurray, Michael DeLorenzo, Doris Belack, David White, Constance Towers, Robert DoQui, Paul Ryan, Tamara Mark, Tracy Silver, Cindy McGee, Monique Cintron, Debra Varnado, Noel Conlon, Robin Bach, Phyllis Enrlich, Bobbie Jordan	
F E B R U A R Y	15	Into the Night	Universal Pictures	John Landis (director); Ron Koslow (screenplay); Jeff Goldblum, Michelle Pfeiffer, Richard Farnsworth, Irene Papas, Kathryn Harrold, Vera Miles, Clu Gulager, Dan Aykroyd, David Bowie, Bruce McGill, Stacey Pickren, Carmen Argenziano, Jake Steinfeld, Art Evans, Ava Cadell, John Landis, Jack Arnold, Rick Baker, Paul Bartel, David Cronenberg, Jonathan Demme, Richard Franklin, Carl Gottlieb, Amy Heckerling, Jim Henson, Colin Higgins, Lawrence Kasdan, Jonathan Lynn, "Blue" Lou Marini, Andrew Marton, Paul Mazursky, Carl Perkins, Daniel Petrie, Dedee Pfeiffer, Waldo Salt, Don Siegel, Roger Vadim, John Hostetter, Cal Worthington, Hope Clarke, Peggy Sands, Bud Abbott, Lou Costello, Bela Lugosi, Lon Chaney Jr., Reid Smith, Alma Beltran, William B. Kaplan, Robert Paynter, Forrest J. Ackerman, Veronica Gamba, Lesa Ann Pedriana, Carina Persson, Susie Scott, Heidi Sorenson, Dona Speir	
F E B R U A R Y	15	The Mean Season	Orion Pictures	Phillip Borsos (director); Leon Piedmont (screenplay); Kurt Russell, Mariel Hemingway, Richard Jordan, Richard Masur, Richard Bradford, Joe Pantoliano, Andy García, William Smith	
F E B R U A R Y	15	Turk 182	20th Century Fox	Bob Clark (director); Denis Hamill, John Hamill, James Gregory Kingston (screenplay): Timothy Hutton, Robert Urich, Kim Cattrall, Robert Culp, Darren McGavin, Peter Boyle, Steven Keats, Paul Sorvino, James Tolkan, Thomas Quinn, Norman Parker, Dick O'Neill, Maury Chaykin, Richard Zobel, David Wohl	
F E B R U A R Y	15	Vision Quest	Warner Bros. Pictures	Harold Becker (director); Darryl Ponicsan (screenplay); Matthew Modine, Linda Fiorentino, Michael Schoeffling, Ronny Cox, Frank Jasper, Harold Sylvester, Daphne Zuniga, Charles Hallahan, J.C. Quinn, R.H. Thomson, Gary Kasper, Raphael Sbarge, Forest Whitaker, Roberts Blossom, James Gammon, Madonna, Ken Pelo, Jana Marie Hupp, Andrew Shue	
F E B R U A R Y	24	Finnegan Begin Again	HBO Premiere Films / Zenith Productions / Consolidated Productions / Jennie & Co.	Joan Micklin Silver (director); Walter Lockwood (screenplay); Mary Tyler Moore, Robert Preston, Sam Waterston, Sylvia Sidney, David Huddleston, Bob Gunton, Giancarlo Esposito, Avery Brooks, Peter Friedman, Ron McLarty, Russell Horton, Jon DeVries, Rick Warner	
M A R C H	1	The Aviator	MGM/UA Entertainment Co. / United Artists / Mace Neufeld Productions	George T. Miller (director); Marc Norman (screenplay); Christopher Reeve, Rosanna Arquette, Jack Warden, Sam Wanamaker, Scott Wilson, Tyne Daly, Marcia Strassman, Will Hare, Frano Lasić, Jeff Harding, Timothy Stack, Glenn Neufeld, Ron Travis	
M A R C H	1	Certain Fury	New World Pictures	Stephen Gyllenhaal (director); Michael Jacobs (screenplay); Tatum O'Neal, Irene Cara, George Murdock, Moses Gunn, Peter Fonda, Nicholas Campbell, Campbell Lane, Frank C. Turner	
M A R C H	1	Lust in the Dust	New World Pictures	Paul Bartel (director); Philip John Taylor (screenplay); Tab Hunter, Divine, Lainie Kazan, Cesar Romero, Geoffrey Lewis, Henry Silva, Courtney Gains, Gina Gallego, Nedra Volz, Woody Strode, Pedro Gonzalez Gonzalez, Noah Wyle	
M A R C H	1	A Private Function	HandMade Films	Malcolm Mowbray (director/screenplay); Alan Bennett (screenplay); Michael Palin, Maggie Smith, Denholm Elliott, Richard Griffiths, Tony Haygarth, John Normington, Bill Paterson, Liz Smith, Alison Steadman, Jim Carter, Pete Postlethwaite, Rachel Davies, Reece Dinsdale	
M A R C H	1	The Purple Rose of Cairo	Orion Pictures	Woody Allen (director/screenplay); Mia Farrow, Jeff Daniels, Danny Aiello, Edward Herrmann, John Wood, Deborah Rush, Zoe Caldwell, Van Johnson, Karen Akers, Milo O'Shea, Dianne Wiest, Michael Tucker, Glenne Headly, George Martin, Loretta Tupper, Maurice Brenner, Paul Herman, Mimi Weddell, Peter McRobbie, Camille Saviola, Juliana Donald, Helen Hanft, Crystal Field, Robert Trebor, John Rothman, Raymond Serra, Fred Astaire, Ginger Rogers	
M A R C H	1	The Sure Thing	Embassy Pictures	Rob Reiner (director); Steven L. Bloom, Jonathan Roberts (screenplay); John Cusack, Daphne Zuniga, Anthony Edwards, Boyd Gaines, Tim Robbins, Lisa Jane Persky, Viveca Lindfors, Nicollette Sheridan, Sarah Buxton, John Putch, Steve Pink, Tracy Reiner, Robert Bauer, Garry Goodrow, Carmen Filpi, Richard Hamilton, George Memmoli, Sunshine Parker, Fran Ryan, Larry Hankin, Christopher Rydell, Chris Tashima	
M A R C H	2	Ghoulies	Empire Pictures	Luca Bercovici (director/screenplay); Jefery Levy (screenplay); Peter Liapis, Lisa Pelikan, Michael Des Barres, Scott Thomson, Mariska Hargitay, Jack Nance, Tamara De Treaux, Ralph Seymour, Keith Joe Dick, David Dayan, Victoria Catlin, Charene Cathleen, Peter Risch, Bobbie Bresee, Jamie Bronow, Brian Connolly, Annie Stocking, Craig Talmy	
M A R C H	2	Missing in Action 2: The Beginning	Cannon Films	Lance Hool (director); Arthur Silver, Larry Levinson, Steve Bing (screenplay); Chuck Norris, Soon-Tek Oh, Steven Williams, Bennett Ohta, Cosie Costa, Joe Michael Terry, Christopher Cary, John Wesley, David Chung, Professor Toru Tanaka, Sergio Kato	
M A R C H	8	The Hit	Palace Pictures	Stephen Frears (director); Peter Prince (screenplay); John Hurt, Tim Roth, Laura del Sol, Terence Stamp, Bill Hunter, Fernando Rey, Lennie Peters, Willoughby Gray, Jim Broadbent	
M A R C H	8	Mask	Universal Pictures	Peter Bogdanovich (director); Anna Hamilton Phelan (screenplay); Cher, Sam Elliott, Eric Stoltz, Estelle Getty, Richard Dysart, Laura Dern, Micole Mercurio, Harry Carey Jr., Dennis Burkley, Lawrence Monoson, Ben Piazza, Alexandra Powers, Kelly Jo Minter, Joe Unger, Steve James, Andrew Robinson, Anna Hamilton Phelan, Nick Cassavetes, Les Dudek, Jo-El Sonnier, Marsha Warfield, Creed Bratton, Barry Tubb, Louis Waldon, Christopher Rydell, Jill Whitlow, Michael Adams, L. Craig King, Todd Allen, Howard Hirdler	
M A R C H	15	Lost in America	The Geffen Film Company	Albert Brooks (director/screenplay); Monica Johnson (screenplay); Albert Brooks, Julie Hagerty, Maggie Roswell, Michael Greene, Garry Marshall, Donald Gibb, Charles Boswell	
M A R C H	15	Sylvester	Columbia Pictures	Tim Hunter (director); Carol Sobieski (screenplay); Richard Farnsworth, Melissa Gilbert, Michael Schoeffling, Constance Towers, Arliss Howard, James Gammon, Peter Kowanko	
M A R C H	22	Baby: Secret of the Lost Legend	Touchstone Films / Silver Screen Partners II	Bill L. Norton (director); Clifford Green, Ellen Green (screenplay); William Katt, Sean Young, Patrick McGoohan, Julian Fellowes, Kyalo Mativo, Hugh Quarshie, Olu Jacobs, Eddie Tagoe, Edward Hardwicke	
M A R C H	22	Friday the 13th: A New Beginning	Paramount Pictures	Danny Steinmann (director/screenplay); Martin Kitrosser, David Cohen (screenplay); Melanie Kinnaman, John Shepherd, Shavar Ross, Richard Young, Dick Wieand, Tiffany Helm, Juliette Cummins, Marco St. John, Jerry Pavlon, Carol Locatell, Debi Sue Voorhees, Vernon Washington, John Robert Dixon, Ron Sloan, Miguel A. Núñez Jr., Jere Fields, Rebecca Wood, Bob DeSimone, Corey Parker, Anthony Barrile, William Caskey Swaim, Dominick Brascia, Mark Venturini, Richard Lineback, Ric Mangini, Corey Feldman, Tom Morga	
M A R C H	22	The Last Dragon	Tri-Star Pictures	Michael Schultz (director); Louis Venosta (screenplay); Taimak, Julius J. Carry III, Chris Murney, Leo O'Brien, Faith Prince, Glen Eaton, Vanity, Jim Moody, Mike Starr, Ernie Reyes, Jr., Esther Marrow, Keshia Knight Pulliam, Chazz Palminteri, William H. Macy, Carl Anthony Payne II, Thomas Ikeda, Jamal Mason, B.J. Barie, London Reyes, Lisa Loving, Jeffrey Dawson	
M A R C H	22	Porky's Revenge!	20th Century Fox	James Komack (director); Ziggy Steinberg (screenplay); Dan Monahan, Wyatt Knight, Tony Ganios, Mark Herrier, Kaki Hunter, Scott Colomby, Nancy Parsons, Chuck Mitchell, Eric Christmas, Kimberly Evenson, Bill Hindman, Nancy Hassinger, Rose McVeigh, Wendy Feign, Fred Buch, Ilse Earl, Ron Campbell, Mal Jones	
M A R C H	22	The Secret of the Sword	Atlantic Releasing	Ed Friedman, Lou Kachivas, Marsh Lamore, Bill Reed, Gwen Wetzler (directors); Larry DiTillio, Bob Forward (screenplay); John Erwin, Melendy Britt, Alan Oppenheimer, Linda Gary, George DiCenzo, Erika Scheimer, Lou Scheimer	
M A R C H	24	The Care Bears Movie	The Samuel Goldwyn Company	Arna Selznick (director); Peter Sauder (screenplay); Mickey Rooney, Jackie Burroughs, Georgia Engel, Sunny Besen Thrasher, Eva Almos, Patricia Black, Melleny Brown, Bobby Dermer, Jayne Eastwood, Anni Evans, Gloria Figura, Cree Summer Francks, Brian George, Janet Laine-Green, Luba Goy, Terri Hawkes, Dan Hennessey, Jim Henshaw, Hadley Kay, Marla Lukofsky, Pauline Rennie, Billie Mae Richards, Brent Titcomb, Harry Dean Stanton	
M A R C H	29	Desperately Seeking Susan	Orion Pictures	Susan Seidelman (director); Leora Barish (screenplay); Rosanna Arquette, Madonna, Aidan Quinn, Mark Blum, Robert Joy, Laurie Metcalf, Anna Levine, Will Patton, Peter Maloney, Steven Wright, John Turturro, Anne Carlisle, José Angel Santana, Giancarlo Esposito, Richard Hell, Rockets Redglare, Annie Golden, Richard Edson, Ann Magnuson, John Lurie, Victor Argo, Shirley Stoler, Arto Lindsay, Kim Chan, Michael Badalucco, Carol Leifer, Harsh Nayyar Eddy, David and Robert	
M A R C H	29	King David	Paramount Pictures	Bruce Beresford (director); Andrew Birkin, James Costigan (screenplay); Richard Gere, Edward Woodward, Alice Krige, Denis Quilley, Niall Buggy, Cherie Lunghi, Hurd Hatfield, Jack Klaff, John Castle, Tim Woodward, David de Keyser, Simon Dutton, Jean-Marc Barr, George Eastman, Arthur Whybrow, Christopher Malcolm, Valentine Pelka, Gina Bellman, James Coombes, Jason Carter, Aïché Nana, Ishia Bennison, Marino Masé, Anton Alexander, Tomás Milián, John Barrard, John Gabriel, Lorenzo Piani, David Graham, John Hallam, Ian Sears, Ned Vukovic, James Lister, Genevieve Allenbury, Massimo Sarchielli, Jenny Lipman, Roberto Renna, Michael Müller, Mark Drewry, Nicholas van der Weide, Shimon Avidan, Peter Frye, David George, Nicola Di Gioia	
M A R C H	29	Police Academy 2: Their First Assignment	Warner Bros. Pictures	Jerry Paris (director); Barry W. Blaustein, David Sheffield (screenplay); Steve Guttenberg, Bubba Smith, David Graf, Michael Winslow, Bruce Mahler, Colleen Camp, Art Metrano, Marion Ramsey, Howard Hesseman, George Gaynes, Peter Van Norden, Ed Herlihy, Lance Kinsey, George R. Robertson, Tim Kazurinsky, Arthur Batanides, Jackie Joseph, Andrew Paris, Jennifer Darling, Lucy Lee Flippin, Jason Hervey, Diana Bellamy, Rich Hall, Bobcat Goldthwait	
M A R C H	29	The Slugger's Wife	Columbia Pictures	Hal Ashby (director); Neil Simon (screenplay); Michael O'Keefe, Rebecca De Mornay, Martin Ritt, Randy Quaid, Cleavant Derricks, Lisa Langlois, Loudon Wainwright III, Georgann Johnson, Lynn Whitfield, Danny Tucker	
M A R C H	30	Forbidden	HBO Premiere Films / Warner Bros. Television / Mark Forstater Productions / Anthea Films	Anthony Page (director); Leonard Gross (teleplay); Jacqueline Bisset, Jürgen Prochnow, Irene Worth, Peter Vaughan, Avis Bunnage, Robert Dietl, Malcolm Kaye, Georg Tryphon, Annie Leon, Amanda Cannings, Osman Ragheb, Herta Schwarz, Gerhard Frey, Susanna Bonasewicz	

== April–June ==
Opening		Title	Production company	Cast and crew	Ref.
A P R I L	3	Alamo Bay	Tri-Star Pictures	Louis Malle (director); Alice Arlen (screenplay); Ed Harris, Amy Madigan, Ho Nguyen, Donald Moffat, William Frankfather, Bill Thurman, Truyen V. Tran, Rudy Young, Cynthia Carle, Martin LaSalle, Lucky Mosley	
A P R I L	12	Cat's Eye	MGM/UA Entertainment Co.	Lewis Teague (director); Stephen King (screenplay); Drew Barrymore, James Woods, Alan King, Kenneth McMillan, Robert Hays, Candy Clark, James Naughton, James Rebhorn, Charles S. Dutton, Mike Starr, Mary D'Arcy	
A P R I L	12	Fraternity Vacation	New World Pictures	James Frawley (director); Lindsay Harrison (screenplay); Stephen Geoffreys, Sheree J. Wilson, Cameron Dye, Leigh McCloskey, Tim Robbins, Matt McCoy, Amanda Bearse, John Vernon, Nita Talbot, Barbara Crampton, Kathleen Kinmont, Max Wright, Julie Payne, Franklin Ajaye, Charles Rocket, Britt Ekland	
A P R I L	12	Girls Just Want to Have Fun	New World Pictures	Alan Metter (director); Amy Spies (screenplay); Sarah Jessica Parker, Lee Montgomery, Morgan Woodward, Jonathan Silverman, Shannen Doherty, Helen Hunt, Ed Lauter, Holly Gagnier, Lee Arnone, Terry McGovern, Biff Yeager, Kristi Somers, Robin Antin, Stuart Fratkin, Gina Gershon, Bruce Goldstein, Scott Coffey, Hank Azaria, Cyndi Lauper, Robert Downey Jr., Margaret Howell, Wayne Bascomb	
A P R I L	12	Ladyhawke	Warner Bros. Pictures	Richard Donner (director); Edward Khmara, Michael Thomas, Tom Mankiewicz, David Peoples (screenplay); Matthew Broderick, Rutger Hauer, Michelle Pfeiffer, Leo McKern, John Wood, Ken Hutchison, Alfred Molina, Giancarlo Prete, Loris Loddi	
A P R I L	19	The Company of Wolves	Palace Pictures / ITC Entertainment	Neil Jordan (director/screenplay); Angela Carter (screenplay); Angela Lansbury, David Warner, Sarah Patterson, Brian Glover, Graham Crowden, Kathryn Pogson, Stephen Rea, Georgia Slowe, Richard Morant, Danielle Dax, Jim Carter, Terence Stamp, Tusse Silberg, Micha Bergese, Susan Porrett, Shane Johnstone, Dawn Archibald	
A P R I L	26	Just One of the Guys	Columbia Pictures	Lisa Gottlieb (director); Dennis Feldman, Jeff Franklin (screenplay); Joyce Hyser, Clayton Rohner, Billy Jacoby, Toni Hudson, William Zabka, Leigh McCloskey, Sherilyn Fenn, Arye Gross, Kenneth Tigar	
A P R I L	26	Stick	Universal Pictures	Burt Reynolds (director); Elmore Leonard, Joseph Stinson (screenplay); Burt Reynolds, George Segal, Candice Bergen, Charles Durning, Annie Potts, Jose Perez, Richard Lawson, Cástulo Guerra, Dar Robinson, Tricia Leigh Fisher, Sachi Parker, Alex Rocco, Thomas Rosales, Jr.	
M A Y	3	Code of Silence	Orion Pictures	Andrew Davis (director); Michael Butler, Dennis Shryack, Mike Gray (screenplay); Chuck Norris, Henry Silva, Bert Remsen, Molly Hagan, Dennis Farina, Mike Genovese, Nathan Davis, Ralph Foody, Ron Dean, Joseph Kosala, Gene Barge, Ronnie Barron, John Mahoney	
M A Y	3	Gotcha!	Universal Pictures	Jeff Kanew (director); Dan Gordon (screenplay); Anthony Edwards, Linda Fiorentino, Nick Corri, Alex Rocco, Marla Adams, Klaus Löwitsch, Bata Kameni, Kari Lizer, David Wohl, Christie Claridge, Christopher Rydell, Brad Cowgill, Irene Olga López, Reggie Thompson	
M A Y	3	Gymkata	Metro-Goldwyn-Mayer	Robert Clouse (director); Charles Robert Carner (screenplay); Kurt Thomas, Tetchie Agbayani, Richard Norton, Conan Lee, Buck Kartalian, Tadashi Yamashita, Slobodan Dimitrijević, Edward Bell, John Berrett, Bob Schott, Eric Lawson, Sonny Barnes, Sharan Lea, Zlatko Pokupec, Ivo Kristof	
M A Y	3	Movers & Shakers	Metro-Goldwyn-Mayer	William Asher (director); Charles Grodin (screenplay); Walter Matthau, Charles Grodin, Vincent Gardenia, Tyne Daly, Bill Macy, Gilda Radner, Earl Boen, Michael Lerner, Joe Mantell, William Prince, Nita Talbot, Judah Katz, Peter Marc Jacobson, Sam Anderson, Frances Bay, Luana Anders, Eugene Dynarski, Philip Sterling, Steve Martin, Penny Marshall	
M A Y	3	Private Resort	Tri-Star Pictures	George Bowers (director); Alan Wenkus, Gordon Mitchell, Ken Segall (screenplay); Rob Morrow, Johnny Depp, Emily Longstreth, Karyn O'Bryan, Andrew Dice Clay, Hector Elizondo, Dody Goodman, Leslie Easterbrook, Michael Bowen, Hilary Shepard Turner, Tony Azito, Jill Selkowitz	
M A Y	8	Creature	Trans World Entertainment	William Malone (director/screenplay); Alan Reed (screenplay); Stan Ivar, Wendy Schaal, Lyman Ward, Robert Jaffe, Diane Salinger, Klaus Kinski, Annette McCarthy, Marie Laurin	
M A Y	10	Rustlers' Rhapsody	Paramount Pictures	Hugh Wilson (director/screenplay); Tom Berenger, G.W. Bailey, Marilu Henner, Fernando Rey, Andy Griffith, Sela Ward, Brant Van Hoffman, Christopher Malcolm, Jim Carter, Patrick Wayne, Paul Maxwell, Billy J. Mitchell, John Orchard	
M A Y	17	Goodbye, New York	Castle Hill Productions	Amos Kollek (director/screenplay); Julie Hagerty, Amos Kollek, Shmuel Shilo, Aviva Ger, Dudu Topaz, Jennifer Prichard, Christopher Goutman, Hanan Goldblatt, Mosko Alkalai, Joseph Kaplanian, Ron Rabinovich, Sophie Haber	
M A Y	17	Ordeal by Innocence	Cannon Films	Desmond Davis (director); Alexander Stuart (screenplay); Donald Sutherland, Faye Dunaway, Christopher Plummer, Sarah Miles, Ian McShane, Diana Quick, Annette Crosbie, Michael Elphick, George Innes, Valerie Whittington, Phoebe Nicholls, Michael Maloney, Cassie Stuart, Anita Carey, Ron Pember, Kevin Stoney, Brian Glover	
M A Y	22	Brewster's Millions	Universal Pictures	Walter Hill (director); Timothy Harris, Herschel Weingrod (screenplay); Richard Pryor, John Candy, Lonette McKee, Stephen Collins, David White, Jerome Dempsey, Jerry Orbach, Pat Hingle, David Wohl, Tovah Feldshuh, Hume Cronyn, Joe Grifasi, Peter Jason, Rick Moranis	
M A Y	22	Rambo: First Blood Part II	Tri-Star Pictures	George P. Cosmatos (director); Sylvester Stallone, James Cameron (screenplay); Sylvester Stallone, Richard Crenna, Charles Napier, Steven Berkoff, Julia Nickson, Martin Kove, George Cheung, Andy Wood, William Ghent, Voyo Goric, Dana Lee, Steve Williams	
M A Y	22	Trancers	Empire Pictures	Charles Band (director); Danny Bilson, Paul De Meo (screenplay); Tim Thomerson, Helen Hunt, Michael Stefani, Art LaFleur, Telma Hopkins, Richard Herd, Anne Seymour, Biff Manard, Peter Schrum, Alyson Croft, Barbara Perry, Richard Erdman, Wiley Harker, Miguel Fernandes	
M A Y	22	A View to a Kill	Metro-Goldwyn-Mayer	John Glen (director); Richard Maibaum, Michael G. Wilson (screenplay); Roger Moore, Christopher Walken, Tanya Roberts, Grace Jones, Patrick Macnee, Patrick Bauchau, David Yip, Willoughby Gray, Fiona Fullerton, Manning Redwood, Alison Doody, Robert Brown, Desmond Llewelyn, Lois Maxwell, Geoffrey Keen, Walter Gotell, Papillon Soo Soo, Daniel Benzali, Mary Stavin, Bogdan Kominowski, Dolph Lundgren, Maud Adams, Jean Rougerie	
M A Y	25	Here Come the Littles	Atlantic Releasing / ABC Entertainment / DIC Enterprises, Inc. / TMS Entertainment	Bernard Deyriès (director); Woody Kling (screenplay); Gregg Berger, Bettina Bush, Robert David Hall, Jimmy E. Keegan, Patricia Parris, Mona Marshall, Alvy Moore, Donavan Freberg, Hal Smith	
M A Y	31	Fletch	Universal Pictures	Michael Ritchie (director); Andrew Bergman (screenplay); Chevy Chase, Joe Don Baker, Dana Wheeler-Nicholson, Richard Libertini, Tim Matheson, M. Emmet Walsh, George Wendt, Kenneth Mars, Geena Davis, Bill Henderson, William Traylor, George Wyner, Tony Longo, Larry "Flash" Jenkins, Ralph Seymour, Kareem Abdul-Jabbar, James Avery, Bruce French, Burton Gilliam, David W. Harper, Chick Hearn, Alison La Placa, William Sanderson, Penny Santon, Robert Sorrells, Beau Starr, Jeannie Epper, Tom Willett	
J U N E	7	The Goonies	Warner Bros. Pictures / Amblin Entertainment	Richard Donner (director); Chris Columbus (screenplay); Sean Astin, Josh Brolin, Jeff Cohen, Corey Feldman, Ke Huy Quan, Kerri Green, Martha Plimpton, John Matuszak, Anne Ramsey, Robert Davi, Joe Pantoliano, Mary Ellen Trainor, Keith Walker, Steve Antin, Lupe Ontiveros, Michael Paul Chan, Richard Donner, Nick McLean, Charles McDaniel, Paul Tuerpe	
J U N E	7	Perfect	Columbia Pictures	James Bridges (director/screenplay); Aaron Latham (screenplay); John Travolta, Jamie Lee Curtis, Jann Wenner, Marilu Henner, Laraine Newman, Anne De Salvo, Matthew Reed, Stefan Gierasch, Murphy Dunne, Kenneth Welsh, Robert Parr, Rosalind Ingledew, Chelsea Field, Ronnie Claire Edwards, Carly Simon, Lauren Hutton, Tom Schiller, Paul Kent, Paul Barresi, Alma Beltran, Kenny Griswold	
J U N E	13	Prizzi's Honor	20th Century Fox	John Huston (director); Richard Condon, Janet Roach (screenplay); Jack Nicholson, Kathleen Turner, Anjelica Huston, Robert Loggia, John Randolph, William Hickey, Lee Richardson, Michael Lombard, C.C.H. Pounder, Lawrence Tierney, Dick O'Neill, Sully Boyar, Joseph Ruskin, Stanley Tucci, Ann Selepegno, Vic Polizos, Raymond Heller, Seth Allen, Dominic Barto, George Santopietro	
J U N E	13	Warriors of the Wind	Toei Company	Hayao Miyazaki (director/screenplay); Susan Davis, Hal Smith, Cam Clarke	
J U N E	14	D.A.R.Y.L.	Paramount Pictures	Simon Wincer (director); David Ambrose, Allan Scott, Jeffrey Ellis (screenplay); Barret Oliver, Mary Beth Hurt, Michael McKean, Danny Corkill, Josef Sommer, David Wohl, Colleen Camp, Steve Ryan, Amy Linker, Kathryn Walker, Hardy Rawls, Jim Fitzpatrick	
J U N E	14	Secret Admirer	Orion Pictures	David Greenwalt (director/screenplay); Jim Kouf (screenplay); C. Thomas Howell, Kelly Preston, Lori Loughlin, Fred Ward, Dee Wallace Stone, Cliff DeYoung, Leigh Taylor-Young, Casey Siemaszko, Geoffrey Blake, Scott McGinnis, Corey Haim, Courtney Gains, Janet Carroll	
J U N E	14	The Stuff	New World Pictures	Larry Cohen (director/screenplay); Michael Moriarty, Andrea Marcovicci, Garrett Morris, Paul Sorvino, Scott Bloom, Danny Aiello, Patrick O'Neal, Alexander Scourby, Russell Nype, Gene O'Neill, Brian Bloom, Harry Bellaver, Rutanya Alda, David Rees Snell, Heidi Miller, John Newton, Brooke Adams, Laurene Landon, Tammy Grimes, Abe Vigoda, Clara Peller, Anthony Perkins, Jason Evers, Barbara Crampton, Jeffrey Combs, Eric Bogosian, Patrick Dempsey, Mira Sorvino, John Laughlin	
J U N E	21	Cocoon	20th Century Fox	Ron Howard (director); Tom Benedek (screenplay); Don Ameche, Wilford Brimley, Hume Cronyn, Brian Dennehy, Jack Gilford, Steve Guttenberg, Maureen Stapleton, Jessica Tandy, Gwen Verdon, Herta Ware, Tahnee Welch, Barret Oliver, Linda Harrison, Tyrone Power Jr., Clint Howard, Charles Lampkin, Rance Howard, Jim Fitzpatrick, Mike Nomad, Jorge Gil, James Ritz	
J U N E	21	A Flash of Green	International Spectrafilm	Victor Nunez (director/screenplay); Ed Harris, Blair Brown, Richard Jordan, George Coe, Joan Goodfellow, Helen Stenborg, William Mooney, John Glover, Malcolm Gets, Jean De Baer, Isa Thomas, Bob Murch, Joan MacIntosh	
J U N E	21	Return to Oz	Walt Disney Pictures	Walter Murch (director/screenplay); Gill Dennis (screenplay); Fairuza Balk, Nicol Williamson, Jean Marsh, Piper Laurie, Matt Clark, Emma Ridley, Justin Case, Pons Maar, Sophie Ward, Fiona Victory, Bruce Boa, Denise Bryer, Sean Barrett, Brian Henson, Lyle Conway, Mak Wilson, Timothy D. Rose, Michael Sundin, Steve Norrington, Deep Roy, John Alexander, Rachael Ashton, Robbie Barnett, Ailsa Berk, Peter Elliott, Roger Ennals, Michele Hine, Mark Hopkins, Colin Skeaping, Ken Stevens, Philip Tan, Rob Thirtle, Beatrice Murch	
J U N E	26	Pale Rider	Warner Bros. Pictures	Clint Eastwood (director); Michael Butler, Dennis Shryack (screenplay); Clint Eastwood, Michael Moriarty, Carrie Snodgress, Richard Dysart, Chris Penn, Sydney Penny, John Russell, Richard Kiel, Doug McGrath, Jeffrey Weissman, S.A. Griffin, Billy Drago, John Dennis Johnston, Charles Hallahan, Fran Ryan, Richard Hamilton, Terrence Evans, Chuck Lafont, Jack Radosta, Robert Winley, Jeffrey Josephson, Marvin J. McIntyre	
J U N E	28	St. Elmo's Fire	Columbia Pictures	Joel Schumacher (director/screenplay); Carl Kurlander (screenplay); Rob Lowe, Demi Moore, Emilio Estevez, Ally Sheedy, Judd Nelson, Mare Winningham, Andrew McCarthy, Martin Balsam, Andie MacDowell, Joyce Van Patten, Jenny Wright, Blake Clark, Matthew Laurance, Gina Hecht, Anna Maria Horsford, Whip Hubley, Jim Turner, Mario Machado, Thom Bierdz	

== July–September ==
Opening		Title	Production company	Cast and crew	Ref.
J U L Y	3	Back to the Future	Universal Pictures / Amblin Entertainment	Robert Zemeckis (director/screenplay); Bob Gale (screenplay); Michael J. Fox, Christopher Lloyd, Lea Thompson, Crispin Glover, Thomas F. Wilson, Claudia Wells, James Tolkan, Marc McClure, Wendie Jo Sperber, George DiCenzo, Frances Lee McCain, Jeffrey Jay Cohen, Casey Siemaszko, Billy Zane, Harry Waters Jr., Donald Fullilove, Will Hare, Jason Hervey, Courtney Gains, Elsa Raven, Huey Lewis	
J U L Y	3	The Emerald Forest	Embassy Films Associates	John Boorman (director); Rospo Pallenberg (screenplay); Powers Boothe, Meg Foster, Charley Boorman, Rui Polanah, Tetchie Agbayani, Dira Paes, Estee Chandler, Eduardo Conde, Átila Iório, Ariel Coelho, Peter Marinker, Mario Borges, Gabriel Archanjo, Gracindo Júnior, Arthur Muhlenberg, Chico Terto, Claudio Moreno, Maria Helena Velasco, Paulo Vinicius, Aloiso Flores, Joao Mauricio Ca, Isabel Bicudo, Patricia Prisco, Silvana de Faria	
J U L Y	3	Red Sonja	MGM/UA Entertainment Co.	Richard Fleischer (director); Clive Exton, George MacDonald Fraser (screenplay); Brigitte Nielsen, Arnold Schwarzenegger, Sandahl Bergman, Paul L. Smith, Ernie Reyes, Jr., Ronald Lacey, Pat Roach, Terry Richards, Janet Agren, Hans Meyer, Tutte Lemkow, Tad Horino, Sven-Ole Thorsen, Erik Holmey	
J U L Y	5	The Lift	Tuschinski Film Distribution / Island Alive	Dick Maas (director/screenplay); Huub Stapel, Willeke van Ammelrooy, Josine van Dalsum	
J U L Y	10	Mad Max Beyond Thunderdome	Warner Bros. Pictures	George Miller (director/screenplay); George Ogilvie (director); Terry Hayes (screenplay); Mel Gibson, Tina Turner, Bruce Spence, Adam Cockburn, Frank Thring, Angelo Rossitto, Paul Larsson, Angry Anderson, Robert Grubb, Helen Buday, Edwin Hodgeman, George Spartels, Tom Jennings, Rod Zuanic	
J U L Y	10	Silverado	Columbia Pictures	Lawrence Kasdan (director/screenplay); Mark Kasdan (screenplay); Kevin Kline, Scott Glenn, Rosanna Arquette, John Cleese, Kevin Costner, Brian Dennehy, Danny Glover, Jeff Goldblum, Linda Hunt, Joe Seneca, Ray Baker, Thomas Wilson Brown, Jeff Fahey, Lynn Whitfield, Amanda Wyss, Richard Jenkins, Brion James, James Gammon, Sheb Wooley, Earl Hindman, Pepe Serna	
J U L Y	12	Explorers	Paramount Pictures	Joe Dante (director); Eric Luke (screenplay); Ethan Hawke, River Phoenix, Jason Presson, Amanda Peterson, Bobby Fite, Dana Ivey, Taliesin Jaffe, James Cromwell, Robert Picardo, Karen Mayo-Chandler, Dick Miller, Meshach Taylor, Mary Kay Place, Brooke Bundy, Leslie Rickert	
J U L Y	14	The Coca-Cola Kid	Roadshow Film Distributors	Dušan Makavejev (director); Frank Moorhouse (screenplay); Eric Roberts, Greta Scacchi, Bill Kerr, Chris Haywood, Kris McQuade, Max Gillies, Tony Barry, Paul Chubb, David Slingsby, Tim Finn, Colleen Clifford, Rebecca Smart, Esben Storm, Steve Dodd, Ian Gilmour	
J U L Y	19	Day of the Dead	United Film Distribution Company	George A. Romero (director/screenplay); Lori Cardille, Joseph Pilato, Terry Alexander, Jarlath Conroy, Richard Liberty, Anthony Dileo Jr., Sherman Howard, Gary Howard Klar, Ralph Marrero, John Amplas, Phillip G. Kellams, Taso Stavrakis, Gregory Nicotero, George A. Romero	
J U L Y	19	Dr. Otto and the Riddle of the Gloom Beam	GoodTimes Home Video	John R. Cherry III (director/screenplay); Jim Varney	
J U L Y	19	E.T. the Extra-Terrestrial (re-release)	Universal Pictures / Amblin Entertainment	Steven Spielberg (director); Melissa Mathison (screenplay); Henry Thomas, Dee Wallace, Peter Coyote, Robert MacNaughton, Drew Barrymore, K.C. Martel, C. Thomas Howell, Sean Frye, Erika Eleniak, Pat Welsh, Anne Lockhart	
J U L Y	19	The Legend of Billie Jean	Tri-Star Pictures	Matthew Robbins (director); Lawrence Konner, Mark Rosenthal (screenplay); Helen Slater, Keith Gordon, Christian Slater, Peter Coyote, Richard Bradford, Martha Gehman, Yeardley Smith, Dean Stockwell, Barry Tubb	
J U L Y	19	The Man with One Red Shoe	20th Century Fox	Stan Dragoti (director); Robert Klane (screenplay); Tom Hanks, Dabney Coleman, Lori Singer, Charles Durning, Carrie Fisher, Jim Belushi, Edward Herrmann, David Ogden Stiers, Tom Noonan, Gerrit Graham, David L. Lander, Art LaFleur, Irving Metzman	
J U L Y	19	Wetherby	MGM/UA Classics	David Hare (director/screenplay); Vanessa Redgrave, Ian Holm, Judi Dench, Stuart Wilson, Tim McInnerny, Suzanna Hamilton, Tom Wilkinson, Marjorie Yates, Joely Richardson, Alan Rickman, Katy Behean, Robert Hines	
J U L Y	24	The Black Cauldron	Walt Disney Pictures	Ted Berman, Richard Rich (directors); Grant Bardsley, Susan Sheridan, John Byner, Nigel Hawthorne, John Hurt, Phil Fondacaro, Freddie Jones, Arthur Malet, Billie Hayes, Peter Renaday, Wayne Allwine, Steve Hale, Phil Nibbelink, John Huston, Eda Reiss Merin, Adele Mails-Morey, James Almanzar, Jack Laing	
J U L Y	26	The Heavenly Kid	Orion Pictures	Cary Medoway (director/screenplay); Martin Copeland (screenplay); Lewis Smith, Jason Gedrick, Jane Kaczmarek, Richard Mulligan, Mark Metcalf, Nancy Valen, Lynne Griffin, Christopher Greenbury	
J U L Y	26	Kiss of the Spider Woman	Island Pictures	Héctor Babenco (director); Leonard Schrader (screenplay); William Hurt, Raúl Juliá, Sonia Braga, José Lewgoy, Milton Gonçalves, Míriam Pires, Nuno Leal Maia, Fernando Torres, Patricio Bisso, Herson Capri, Denise Dumont, Ana Maria Braga, Sergio Kato, Miguel Falabella, Antonio Petrin, Wilson Grey	
J U L Y	26	National Lampoon's European Vacation	Warner Bros. Pictures	Amy Heckerling (director); John Hughes, Robert Klane (screenplay); Chevy Chase, Beverly D'Angelo, Dana Hill, Jason Lively, John Astin, Malcolm Danare, William Zabka, Gary Owens, Jeannette Charles, Mel Smith, Robbie Coltrane, Maureen Lipman, Paul McDowell, Ballard Berkeley, Eric Idle, Jacques Herlin, Willy Millowitsch, Claudia Neidig, Victor Lanoux, Moon Unit Zappa	
A U G U S T	2	Fright Night	Columbia Pictures	Tom Holland (director/screenplay); Chris Sarandon, William Ragsdale, Amanda Bearse, Roddy McDowall, Stephen Geoffreys, Jonathan Stark, Dorothy Fielding, Art J. Evans, Stewart Stern, Ernie Holmes, Nick Savage, Heidi Sorenson	
A U G U S T	2	Sesame Street Presents: Follow That Bird	Warner Bros. Pictures /Sesame Workshop Formerly CTW /The Jim Henson Company Formerly Henson Associates	Ken Kwapis (director); Judy Freudberg, Tony Geiss (screenplay); Caroll Spinney, Jim Henson, Frank Oz, Richard Hunt, Jerry Nelson, Kathryn Mullen, Pam Arciero, Martin P. Robinson, Sally Kellerman, Laraine Newman, Brian Hohlfeld, Cathy Silvers, Eddie Deezen, Tim Gosley, Noel MacNeal, Bob McGrath, Roscoe Orman, Linda Bove, Emilio Delgado, Sonia Manzano, Alaina Reed Hall, Loretta Long, Kermit Love, Joe Flaherty, Dave Thomas, Alyson Court, Waylon Jennings, Sandra Bernhard, Chevy Chase, John Candy, Paul Bartel	
A U G U S T	2	Weird Science	Universal Pictures	John Hughes (director/screenplay); Anthony Michael Hall, Ilan Mitchell-Smith, Kelly LeBrock, Bill Paxton, Robert Downey Jr., Robert Rusler, Suzanne Snyder, Judie Aronson, Vernon Wells, Britt Leach, Ivor Barry, Pamela Gordon, Michael Berryman, John Kapelos, D'Mitch Davis, Jill Whitlow, Wally Ward, Renee Props	
A U G U S T	7	Real Genius	Tri-Star Pictures	Martha Coolidge (director); Neal Israel, Pat Proft, Peter Torokvei (screenplay); Val Kilmer, Gabe Jarret, Michelle Meyrink, William Atherton, Robert Prescott, Jon Gries, Mark Kamiyama, Ed Lauter, Louis Giambalvo, Patti D'Arbanville, Severn Darden, Beau Billingslea, Joanne Baron, Sandy Martin, Dean Devlin, Yuji Okumoto, Deborah Foreman, Stacy Peralta	
A U G U S T	9	Dim Sum: A Little Bit of Heart	Orion Classics / CIM / Project A Partnership	Wayne Wang (director); Terrel Seltzer (screenplay); Laureen Chew, Victor Wong, Cora Miao, Amy Hill, Joan Chen, Kim Chew, Ida F.O. Chung, John Nishio, Keith Choy, Elsa Cruz Pearson, Helen Chew, Jarrett Chew	
A U G U S T	9	My Science Project	Touchstone Films	Jonathan R. Betuel (director/screenplay); John Stockwell, Danielle von Zerneck, Fisher Stevens, Raphael Sbarge, Richard Masur, Barry Corbin, Ann Wedgeworth, Dennis Hopper	
A U G U S T	9	Pee-wee's Big Adventure	Warner Bros. Pictures	Tim Burton (director); Phil Hartman, Paul Reubens, Michael Varhol (screenplay); Paul Reubens, E.G. Daily, Mark Holton, Diane Salinger, Judd Omen, Alice Nunn, Phil Hartman, John Harris, Daryl Keith Roach, Carmen Filpi, Jan Hooks, Jason Hervey, Tony Bill, Lynne Marie Stewart, John Paragon, Cleve Hall, Tim Burton, Michael Varhol, Ed Herlihy, Cassandra Peterson, James Brolin, Morgan Fairchild, Twisted Sister, Milton Berle, John Moody, Ralph Seymour	
A U G U S T	9	Pray for Death	Trans World Entertainment	Gordon Hessler (director); James Booth (screenplay); Sho Kosugi, Norman Burton, James Booth, Kane Kosugi, Donna K. Benz, Michael Constantine, Parley Baer, Robert Ito, Shane Kosugi, Matthew Faison	
A U G U S T	9	Summer Rental	Paramount Pictures	Carl Reiner (director); Mark Reisman, Jeremy Stevens (screenplay); John Candy, Karen Austin, Kerri Green, Joey Lawrence, Aubrey Jene, Rip Torn, Richard Crenna, John Larroquette, Richard Herd, Lois Hamilton, Carmine Caridi, Frank McCarthy, Bob Wells, Dick Anthony Williams, Reni Santoni	
A U G U S T	14	Key Exchange	20th Century Fox	Barnet Kellman (director); Paul Kurta, Kevin Scott (screenplay); Brooke Adams, Ben Masters, Danny Aiello, Seth Allen, Kerry Armstrong, Sandra Beall, Annie Golden, Peter Brinkerhoff, Ian Calderon, Keith Charles, Roger Christiansen, John Cunningham, Ned Eisenberg, Terri Garber, Deborah Offner, Maggie Renzi, Tony Roberts, Bill Smitrovich, John Spencer, Daniel Stern, Holland Taylor, Dan Ziskie, Barnet Kellman, Mayor Edward I. Koch	
A U G U S T	16	American Flyers	Warner Bros. Pictures	John Badham (director); Steve Tesich (screenplay); Kevin Costner, Rae Dawn Chong, Alexandra Paul, David Grant, Janice Rule, Jennifer Grey, Robert Townsend, John Amos, Luca Bercovici	
A U G U S T	16	The Bride	Columbia Pictures	Franc Roddam (director); Lloyd Fonvielle (screenplay); Sting, Jennifer Beals, Clancy Brown, Geraldine Page, David Rappaport, Anthony Higgins, Alexei Sayle, Veruschka von Lehndorff, Quentin Crisp, Cary Elwes, Phil Daniels, Timothy Spall, Ken Campbell, Guy Rolfe, Tony Haygarth, Janine Duvitski, John Sharp, Jack Birkett, Gerry Crampton	
A U G U S T	16	The Return of the Living Dead	Orion Pictures	Dan O'Bannon (director/screenplay); Clu Gulager, James Karen, Don Calfa, Thom Mathews, Beverly Randolph, John Philbin, Jewel Shepard, Miguel A. Núñez Jr., Brian Peck, Linnea Quigley, Mark Venturini, Jonathan Terry, Cathleen Cordell, Allan Trautman, John Durbin, Drew Deighan, James Dalesandro, Terrence Houlihan, Jerome Coleman, Cherry Davis, David Bond	
A U G U S T	16	Volunteers	Tri-Star Pictures	Nicholas Meyer (director); Keith F. Critchlow, David Isaacs, Ken Levine (screenplay); Tom Hanks, John Candy, Rita Wilson, Tim Thomerson, Gedde Watanabe, George Plimpton, Allan Arbus, Xander Berkeley, Ernest Harada	
A U G U S T	16	Year of the Dragon	MGM/UA Entertainment Company	Michael Cimino (director/screenplay); Oliver Stone (screenplay); Mickey Rourke, John Lone, Ariane, Dennis Dun, Raymond J. Barry, Leonard Termo, Caroline Kava, Eddie Jones, Victor Wong, Tony Lip, Roza Ng	
A U G U S T	23	Better Off Dead	Warner Bros. Pictures	Savage Steve Holland (director/screenplay); John Cusack, David Ogden Stiers, Diane Franklin, Kim Darby, Curtis Armstrong, Amanda Wyss, Yuji Okumoto, Dan Schneider, Chuck Mitchell, Vincent Schiavelli, Taylor Negron, Rick Rosenthal, E.G. Daily, Aaron Dozier, Demian Slade, Scooter Stevens, Brian Imada, Laura Waterbury	
A U G U S T	23	Crossover Dreams	New Yorker Films / Miramax Films	Leon Ichaso (director/screenplay); Manuel Arce (screenplay); Rubén Blades, Joel Diamond, Elizabeth Peña, Deborra-Lee Furness, Frank Robles, Shawn Elliott, Tom Signorelli, Virgilio Martí, John Hammil	
A U G U S T	23	Godzilla 1985	New World Pictures / Toho Pictures, Inc.	R.J. Kizer, Koji Hashimoto (directors); Shuichi Nagahara, Lisa Tomei (screenplay); Raymond Burr, Ken Tanaka, Yasuko Sawaguchi, Yosuke Natsuki, Keiju Kobayashi, Shin Takuma, Eitaro Ozawa, Hiroshi Koizumi, Mizuho Suzuki, Taketoshi Naito, Yoshifumi Tajima, Justin Gocke, Tony Plana, Lara Cody, Gregory Snegoff, Kenpachiro Satsuma	
A U G U S T	23	Teen Wolf	Atlantic Releasing Corporation	Rod Daniel (director); Jeph Loeb, Matthew Weisman (screenplay); Michael J. Fox, James Hampton, Susan Ursitti, Jerry Levine, Matt Adler, Lorie Griffin, Jim McKrell, Mark Arnold, Jay Tarses, Mark Holton, Scott Paulin, Doug Savant	
A U G U S T	30	American Ninja	Cannon Film Distributors	Sam Firstenberg (director); Paul De Mielche (screenplay); Michael Dudikoff, Steve James, Judie Aronson, Guich Koock, John Fujioka, Don Stewart, John La Motta, Tadashi Yamashita, Phil Brock	
A U G U S T	30	Compromising Positions	Paramount Pictures	Frank Perry (director); Susan Isaacs (screenplay); Susan Sarandon, Raúl Juliá, Edward Herrmann, Judith Ivey, Mary Beth Hurt, Anne De Salvo, Josh Mostel, Deborah Rush, Joe Mantegna, Joan Allen	
A U G U S T	30	Flesh+Blood	Orion Pictures / Riverside Pictures / Impala Studios	Paul Verhoeven (director/screenplay); Gerard Soeteman (screenplay); Rutger Hauer, Jennifer Jason Leigh, Tom Burlinson, Susan Tyrrell, Ronald Lacey, Jack Thompson, Fernando Hilbeck, Brion James, Bruno Kirby, Simon Andreu, John Dennis Johnston, Marina Saura, Kitty Courbois, Jake Wood, Nancy Cartwright, Héctor Alterio, Siobhan Hayes, Anne Lockhart, Blanca Marsillach, Jorge Bosso, Mario De Barros, Hans Veerman, Ida Bons, Jaime Segura, Bettina Brenner, Susan Beresford, Mònica Lucchetti	
A U G U S T	30	Gremlins (re-release)	Warner Bros. Pictures / Amblin Entertainment	Joe Dante (director); Chris Columbus (screenplay); Zach Galligan, Phoebe Cates, Hoyt Axton, Polly Holliday, Frances Lee McCain, Judge Reinhold, Dick Miller, Glynn Turman, Keye Luke, Scott Brady, Corey Feldman, Jonathan Banks, Edward Andrews, Jackie Joseph, Belinda Balaski, Harry Carey Jr., Nick Katt, Tracy Wells, John C. Becher, Joe Brooks, Howie Mandel, Frank Welker, Don Steele, Marvin Miller, Michael Winslow, Bob Bergen, Fred Newman, Peter Cullen, Bob Holt, Steven Spielberg, Jim McKrell, Tom Bergeron, Jerry Goldsmith, William Schallert, Chuck Jones, Kenneth Tobey, Richard Carlson, Kenny Davis, Gwen Willson, Arnie Moore, Mark Dodson, Michael Sheehan, Brad Kesten	
S E P T E M B E R	10	Smooth Talk	American Playhouse / Goldcrest Films	Joyce Chopra (director); Tom Cole (screenplay); Treat Williams, Laura Dern, Mary Kay Place, Elizabeth Berridge, Levon Helm, Geoff Hoyle, William Ragsdale, Michael French, Margaret Welsh, Sara Inglis, David Berridge, Mark McKay, Joy Carlin, Carl Mueller, Cab Covay	
S E P T E M B E R	13	After Hours	The Geffen Film Company	Martin Scorsese (director); Joseph Minion (screenplay); Griffin Dunne, Rosanna Arquette, Verna Bloom, Tommy Chong, Linda Fiorentino, Teri Garr, John Heard, Cheech Marin, Catherine O'Hara, Dick Miller, Will Patton, Bronson Pinchot, Rocco Sisto, Larry Block, Victor Argo, Clarence Felder, Martin Scorsese	
S E P T E M B E R	15	Death of a Salesman	CBS / Roxbury Productions / Punch Productions	Volker Schlöndorff (director); Arthur Miller (screenplay); Dustin Hoffman, Kate Reid, John Malkovich, Stephen Lang, Charles Durning, David S. Chandler, Louis Zorich, Kathryn Rossetter, Jon Polito, Linda Kozlowski, Anne McIntosh, Tom Signorelli, Karen Needle	
S E P T E M B E R	20	Creator	Universal Pictures	Ivan Passer (director); Jeremy Leven (screenplay); Peter O'Toole, Mariel Hemingway, Vincent Spano, Virginia Madsen, David Ogden Stiers, John Dehner, Karen Kopins, Kenneth Tigar, Elsa Raven, Rance Howard, Ellen Geer, Ian Wolfe, Byrne Piven, Jordan Charney, William H. Bassett, Jeff Corey, Michael McGrady, Eve McVeagh	
S E P T E M B E R	20	Plenty	20th Century Fox	Fred Schepisi (director); David Hare (screenplay); Meryl Streep, Charles Dance, Tracey Ullman, John Gielgud, Sting, Ian McKellen, Sam Neill, Burt Kwouk, Pik-Sen Lim	
S E P T E M B E R	25	Marie	MGM/UA Entertainment	Roger Donaldson (director); John Briley (screenplay); Sissy Spacek, Jeff Daniels, Morgan Freeman, Keith Szarabajka, Fred Dalton Thompson, Lisa Banes, Trey Wilson, John Cullum, Don Hood, Graham Beckel, Macon McCalman, Collin Wilcox Paxton, Vincent Irizarry, Clarence Felder, Lisa Foster, Leon Rippy, Timothy Carhart, Stephen Henderson, Jane Powell, Melissa Sue Anderson	
S E P T E M B E R	27	Agnes of God	Columbia Pictures	Norman Jewison (director); John Pielmeier (screenplay); Jane Fonda, Anne Bancroft, Meg Tilly, Anne Pitoniak, Winston Rekert, Gratien Gélinas, Gabriel Arcand, Françoise Faucher, Françoise Berd, Guy Hoffman, Jacques Tourangeau, Janine Fluet, Deborah Grover, Michele George, Samantha Langevin, Jacqueline Blais, Mimi D'Estée, Rita Tuckett, Lillian Graham, Norma Dell'Agnese, Muguette Moreau, Janice Bryan, Agnes Middleton	
S E P T E M B E R	27	Invasion U.S.A.	Cannon Films	Joseph Zito (director); James Bruner, Chuck Norris (screenplay); Chuck Norris, Richard Lynch, Eddie Jones, Billy Drago, Jaime Sánchez, Dehl Berti, Martin Shakar, James Pax, Melissa Prophet, Alexander Zale, Alex Colon, Jon DeVries, James O'Sullivan, Stephen Markle, Shane McCamey	
S E P T E M B E R	27	The Journey of Natty Gann	Walt Disney Pictures	Jeremy Kagan (director); Jeanne Rosenberg (screenplay); Meredith Salenger, John Cusack, Ray Wise, Lainie Kazan, Scatman Crothers, Barry Miller, Verna Bloom, John P. Finnegan, Garry Chalk, Frank C. Turner, Gabrielle Rose, Don S. Davis, Alek Diakun, Grant Heslov, Bruce M. Fischer, Zachary Ansley, Campbell Lane, Jed the Wolfdog, Matthew Faison, Jordan Pratt, Jack Rader, Max Trumpower	
S E P T E M B E R	27	Maxie	Orion Pictures	Paul Aaron (director); Patricia Resnick (screenplay); Glenn Close, Mandy Patinkin, Ruth Gordon, Barnard Hughes, Valerie Curtin, Michael Ensign, Harry Hamlin, Leeza Gibbons, Googy Gress, Lou Cutell, Michael Laskin, Nelson Welch	

== October–December ==
Opening		Title	Production company	Cast and crew	Ref.
O C T O B E R	4	Commando	20th Century Fox	Mark L. Lester (director); Steven E. de Souza (screenplay); Arnold Schwarzenegger, Rae Dawn Chong, Alyssa Milano, Vernon Wells, James Olson, David Patrick Kelly, Bill Duke, Dan Hedaya, Drew Snyder, Michael Delano, Chelsea Field, Bill Paxton, Sharon Wyatt, Bob Minor, Ava Cadell, Branscombe Richmond, Thomas Rosales Jr., Nick Dimitri, Dick Warlock, Tom Willett	
O C T O B E R	4	Dreamchild	Thorn EMI	Gavin Millar (director); Dennis Potter (screenplay); Coral Browne, Peter Gallagher, Ian Holm, Jane Asher, Nicola Cowper, Caris Corfman, Amelia Shankley, Alan Bennett, Ken Campbell, Tony Haygarth, Fulton Mackay, Frank Middlemass, Julie Walters, Big Mick, Ron Mueck, Karen Prell, Michael Sundin, Steve Whitmire	
O C T O B E R	4	Jagged Edge	Columbia Pictures	Richard Marquand (director); Joe Eszterhas (screenplay); Glenn Close, Jeff Bridges, Peter Coyote, Robert Loggia, John Dehner, Karen Austin, Guy Boyd, Marshall Colt, Louis Giambalvo, Lance Henriksen, LeVar Burton, James Karen, Leigh Taylor-Young, William Allen Young, John Clark, Ben Hammer, Sanford Jensen, Diane Erickson, Maria Mayenzet	
O C T O B E R	4	Mishima: A Life in Four Chapters	Warner Bros. Pictures	Paul Schrader (director/screenplay); Leonard Schrader (screenplay); Ken Ogata, Kenji Sawada, Toshiyuki Nagashima, Yasosuke Bando, Masayuki Shionoya, Junkichi Orimoto, Hiroshi Mikami, Naoko Otani, Haruko Kato, Kōichi Satō, Hisako Manda, Chishū Ryū, Naomi Oki, Miki Takakura, Reisen Lee, Setsuko Karasuma, Sachiko Hidari, Tadanori Yokoo, Yasuaki Kurata, Hiroshi Katsuno, Jun Negami, Hiroki Ida, Naoya Makoto, Ryō Ikebe, Alan Mark Poul, Roy Scheider	
O C T O B E R	4	Sweet Dreams	Tri-Star Pictures	Karel Reisz (director); Robert Getchell (screenplay); Jessica Lange, Ed Harris, Ann Wedgeworth, David Clennon, James Staley, Gary Basaraba, John Goodman, P.J. Soles, Jerry Haynes, Boxcar Willie	
O C T O B E R	4	A Zed & Two Noughts	Artificial Eye / Channel Four Films	Peter Greenaway (director/screenplay); Andréa Ferréol, Brian Deacon, Eric Deacon, Frances Barber, Joss Ackland	
O C T O B E R	11	Remo Williams: The Adventure Begins	Orion Pictures	Guy Hamilton (director); Christopher Wood (screenplay); Fred Ward, Joel Grey, Wilford Brimley, J.A. Preston, George Coe, Charles Cioffi, Kate Mulgrew, Patrick Kilpatrick, Michael Pataki, Marv Albert, Reginald VelJohnson, Jon Polito, Gene LeBell, Sebastián Ligarde, Roger Cudney, Tom McBride, Wendy Gazelle, Suzanne Snyder, William Hickey	
O C T O B E R	11	Silver Bullet	Paramount Pictures	Dan Attias (director); Stephen King (screenplay); Corey Haim, Gary Busey, Everett McGill, Megan Follows, Terry O'Quinn, Lawrence Tierney, Bill Smitrovich, Kent Broadhurst, David Hart, James Gammon, Tovah Feldshuh, Joe Wright, Robin Groves	
O C T O B E R	18	The Holcroft Covenant	Universal Pictures	John Frankenheimer (director); Edward Anhalt, George Axelrod, John Hopkins (screenplay); Michael Caine, Anthony Andrews, Victoria Tennant, Lilli Palmer, Mario Adorf, Michael Lonsdale, Bernard Hepton, Shane Rimmer, Alexander Kerst, Richard Münch, Michael Wolf	
O C T O B E R	18	The Quiet Earth	Skouras Pictures	Geoff Murphy (director); Bill Baer, Bruno Lawrence, Sam Pillsbury (screenplay); Bruno Lawrence, Alison Routledge, Peter Smith	
O C T O B E R	18	Re-Animator	Empire International Pictures	Stuart Gordon (director); Brian Yuzna (screenplay); Jeffrey Combs, Bruce Abbott, Barbara Crampton, David Gale, Robert Sampson, Al Berry, Carolyn Purdy-Gordon, Ian Patrick Williams, Gerry Black, Peter Kent, Craig Reed	
O C T O B E R	18	Wild Geese II	Frontier Films / Thorn EMI Screen Entertainment	Peter Hunt (director); Reginald Rose (screenplay); Scott Glenn, Barbara Carrera, Edward Fox, Laurence Olivier, Robert Freitag, Kenneth Haigh, Stratford Johns, Derek Thompson, Robert Webber	
O C T O B E R	20	I Dream of Jeannie... Fifteen Years Later	NBC / Sony Pictures Television / Columbia Pictures Television / Can't Sing Can't Dance Productions	William Asher (director); Irma Kalish (screenplay); Barbara Eden, Wayne Rogers, Bill Daily, Hayden Rorke, Mackenzie Astin, André De Shields, Dody Goodman, John Bennett Perry, Dori Brenner, Nicole Eggert, Michael Fairman	
O C T O B E R	23	Twice in a Lifetime	Bud Yorkin Productions	Bud Yorkin (director); Colin Welland (screenplay); Gene Hackman, Ann-Margret, Ellen Burstyn, Amy Madigan, Ally Sheedy, Brian Dennehy, Stephen Lang, Darrell Larson	
O C T O B E R	25	Krush Groove	Warner Bros. Pictures	Michael Schultz (director); Ralph Farquhar (screenplay); Blair Underwood, Sheila E., Run-DMC, Jam Master Jay, The Fat Boys, Kurtis Blow, New Edition, Beastie Boys, LL Cool J, Russell Simmons, Richard Gant, LisaGay Hamilton, Rick Rubin, Nayobe, Vicky Ruane, Dr. Jeckyll & Mr. Hyde, Brian "B-Fine" George, Paul Anthony George, Chris Rock, Kara Vallow, Coati Mundi, Donnie Simpson	
N O V E M B E R	1	Death Wish 3	Cannon Film Distributors	Michael Winner (director/screenplay); Menahem Golan, Yoram Globus (screenplay); Charles Bronson, Deborah Raffin, Ed Lauter, Martin Balsam, Gavan O'Herlihy, Alex Winter, Marina Sirtis, Ricco Ross, Barbie Wilde, Manning Redwood	
N O V E M B E R	1	Eleni	Warner Bros. Pictures / CBS Theatrical Films	Peter Yates (director); Nicholas Gage, Steve Tesich (screenplay); Kate Nelligan, John Malkovich, Linda Hunt, Oliver Cotton, Ronald Pickup, Rosalie Crutchley, Glenne Headly, Dimitra Arliss, Steve Plytas, Peter Woodthorpe, Jon Rumney, Alison King, Leon Lissek, Stefan Gryff, Michael Zelniker, Keram Malicki-Sánchez, Vic Tablian, Aaron Schwartz, Theresa Tova, Lisa Jakub, Alfred Molina	
N O V E M B E R	1	A Nightmare on Elm Street 2: Freddy's Revenge	New Line Cinema / Heron Communications / Smart Egg Pictures	Jack Sholder (director); David Chaskin (screenplay); Robert Englund, Mark Patton, Kim Myers, Robert Rusler, Clu Gulager, Hope Lange, Christie Clark, Marshall Bell, Melinda O. Fee, Tom McFadden, Sydney Walsh, Lyman Ward, JoAnn Willette, Steve Eastin, Brian Wimmer, Kerry Remsen, Robert Shaye	
N O V E M B E R	1	To Live and Die in L.A.	MGM/UA Entertainment Co.	William Friedkin (director/screenplay); Gerald Petievich (screenplay); William Petersen, Willem Dafoe, John Pankow, Debra Feuer, John Turturro, Darlanne Fluegel, Dean Stockwell, Steve James, Robert Downey Sr., Michael Greene, Jack Hoar, Christopher Allport, Valentin de Vargas, Dwier Brown, Jane Leeves, Dar Robinson, Thomas F. Duffy, Gary Cole, Gerald Petievich, Michael Chong, Jacqueline Giroux	
N O V E M B E R	3	North and South	ABC / David L. Wolper Productions / Warner Bros. Television	Richard T. Heffron (director); Douglas Heyes, John Jakes, Paul F. Edwards, Patricia Green, Kathleen A. Shelley (screenplay); Patrick Swayze, James Read, Lesley-Anne Down, Wendy Kilbourne, Kirstie Alley, Jean Simmons, Mitchell Ryan, Terri Garber, Genie Francis, David Ogden Stiers, David Carradine, Jonathan Frakes, Robert Mitchum, Hal Holbrook, Philip Casnoff, Lewis Smith, John Stockwell, Wendy Fulton, Morgan Fairchild, Inga Swenson, Jim Metzler, Tony Frank, David Harris, Erica Gimpel, Forest Whitaker, Andrew Stahl, Olivia Cole, Elizabeth Taylor, Georg Stanford Brown, John Anderson, Lee Bergere, Mark Moses, Robert Guillaume, Johnny Cash, Chris Douridas, James Rebhorn, Temi Epstein, Cary Guffey	
N O V E M B E R	8	Bring On the Night	The Samuel Goldwyn Company	Michael Apted (director/screenplay); Sting, Omar Hakim, Darryl Jones, Kenny Kirkland, Branford Marsalis, Dolette McDonald, Janice Pendarvis	
N O V E M B E R	8	The Official Story	Almi Pictures	Luis Puenzo (director/screenplay); Aída Bortnik (screenplay); Norma Aleandro, Héctor Alterio, Chunchuna Villafañe, Hugo Arana, Guillermo Battaglia, Chela Ruiz, Patricio Contreras, Pablo Rago, María Luisa Robledo, Aníbal Morixe, Jorge Petraglia, Analía Castro, Daniel Lago, Augusto Larreta	
N O V E M B E R	8	Target	Warner Bros. Pictures	Arthur Penn (director); Jose Luis Navarro, Don Petersen, Leonard B. Stern (screenplay); Gene Hackman, Matt Dillon, Gayle Hunnicutt, Josef Sommer, Guy Boyd, Viktoriya Fyodorova, Herbert Berghof, Richard Münch, Werner Pochath, Jany Holt, Ilona Grübel, James Selby, Ray Fry	
N O V E M B E R	8	That Was Then... This Is Now	Paramount Pictures	Christopher Cain (director); Emilio Estevez (screenplay); Emilio Estevez, Craig Sheffer, Kim Delaney, Jill Schoelen, Larry B. Scott, Barbara Babcock, Morgan Freeman, Frank McCarthy, Ramon Estevez, Frank Howard, Diane Dorsey	
N O V E M B E R	8	Transylvania 6-5000	New World Pictures	Rudy De Luca (director/screenplay); Jeff Goldblum, Ed Begley Jr., Joseph Bologna, Carol Kane, Jeffrey Jones, John Byner, Geena Davis, Michael Richards, Donald Gibb, Norman Fell, Teresa Ganzel, Rudy De Luca, Inge Appelt, Božidar Smiljanić	
N O V E M B E R	15	Once Bitten	The Samuel Goldwyn Company	Howard Storm (director); Jonathan Roberts, David Hines, Jeffrey Hause (screenplay); Lauren Hutton, Jim Carrey, Karen Kopins, Cleavon Little, Richard Schaal, Peggy Pope, Megan Mullally, Joseph Brutsman, Stuart Charno, Carey More, Thomas Ballatore, Skip Lackey, Jeb Stuart Adams, Robin Klein, Glen Mauro, Gary Mauro	
N O V E M B E R	15	Rainbow Brite and the Star Stealer	Warner Bros. Pictures	Kimio Yabuki, Bernard Deyriès (directors); Jean Chalopin, Howard R. Cohen (screenplay); Bettina, Patrick Fraley, Peter Cullen, Robbie Lee, Andre Stojka, David Mendenhall, Les Tremayne, Mona Marshall, Jonathan Harris, Scott Menville, Charlie Adler, Rhonda Aldrich, Marissa Mendenhall, David Workman	
N O V E M B E R	22	Bad Medicine	20th Century Fox	Harvey Miller (director/screenplay); Steve Guttenberg, Alan Arkin, Julie Hagerty, Bill Macy, Curtis Armstrong, Julie Kavner, Joe Grifasi, Robert Romanus, Taylor Negron, Candi Milo, Gilbert Gottfried, Eileen Way, Allan Corduner, Tresa Hughes, José Canalejas, John Sterland	
N O V E M B E R	22	Fever Pitch	MGM/UA Entertainment Co.	Richard Brooks (director/screenplay); Ryan O'Neal, Catherine Hicks, Giancarlo Giannini, Bridgette Andersen, Chad Everett, John Saxon, Hank Greenspun, William Smith, Keith Hefner, Patrick Cassidy, William Prince, Chad McQueen, Fred Robledo	
N O V E M B E R	22	King Solomon's Mines	The Cannon Group	J. Lee Thompson (director); Gene Quintano, James R. Silke (screenplay); Richard Chamberlain, Sharon Stone, Herbert Lom, John Rhys-Davies, Ken Gampu, Shaike Ophir, June Buthelezi, Sam Williams, Mick Lesley, Vincent Van der Byl, Bob Greer, Oliver Tengende, Neville Thomas, Bishop McThuzen, Isiah Murert	
N O V E M B E R	22	One Magic Christmas	Walt Disney Pictures	Phillip Borsos (director); Thomas Meehan (screenplay); Mary Steenburgen, Gary Basaraba, Harry Dean Stanton, Arthur Hill, Elisabeth Harnois, Michelle Meyrink, Elias Koteas, Wayne Robson, Jan Rubeš, Sarah Polley, Graham Jarvis, Robbie Magwood, Timothy Webber, Joy Thompson, John Friesen	
N O V E M B E R	22	Starchaser: The Legend of Orin	Atlantic Releasing	Steven Hahn (director); Jeffrey Scott (screenplay); Joe Colligan, Carmen Argenziano, Anthony De Longis, Noelle North, Tyke Caravelli, Les Tremayne, Daryl Bartley, Tina Romanus, Thomas H. Watkins, Mickey Morton, John Moschitta, Jr., Ken Sansom, Mona Marshall, Herb Vigran, Cathy Cavadini, Marilyn Schreffler, Susan Silo	
N O V E M B E R	22	White Nights	Columbia Pictures	Taylor Hackford (director); James Goldman, Eric Hughes (screenplay); Mikhail Baryshnikov, Gregory Hines, Jerzy Skolimowski, Helen Mirren, Geraldine Page, Isabella Rossellini, John Glover, Stefan Gryff, William Hootkins, Shane Rimmer, Marc Sinden, Maryam d'Abo, Daniel Benzali	
N O V E M B E R	24	Ewoks: The Battle for Endor	ABC / Lucasfilm	Ken Wheat, Jim Wheat (director/screenplay); Warwick Davis, Wilford Brimley, Carel Struycken, Siân Phillips, Paul Gleason, Eric Walker, Tony Cox, Johnny Weissmuller Jr., Matthew Roloff, Aubree Miller, Niki Botelho, Marianne Horine, Daniel Frishman, Pam Grizz, Roger Johnson, Michael Pritchard	
N O V E M B E R	27	Rocky IV	MGM/UA Entertainment Company	Sylvester Stallone (director/screenplay); Sylvester Stallone, Talia Shire, Burt Young, Carl Weathers, Dolph Lundgren, Brigitte Nielsen, Tony Burton, Michael Pataki, Rocky Krakoff, LeRoy Neiman, Burgess Meredith, James Brown, Stu Nahan, Warner Wolf, R.J. Adams, Barry Tompkins, Al Bandiero, David Lloyd Austin	
N O V E M B E R	27	Santa Claus: The Movie	Tri-Star Pictures	Jeannot Szwarc (director); David Newman (screenplay); Dudley Moore, John Lithgow, David Huddleston, Judy Cornwell, Burgess Meredith, Jeffrey Kramer, Christian Fitzpatrick, Carrie Kei Heim, John Barrard, Anthony O'Donnell, Melvyn Hayes, Don Estelle, Tim Stern, Peter O'Farrell, Christopher Ryan, Keith Hayden, Shannon Spruill, Nigel Paterson	
D E C E M B E R	4	Young Sherlock Holmes	Paramount Pictures / Amblin Entertainment	Barry Levinson (director); Chris Columbus (screenplay); Nicholas Rowe, Alan Cox, Anthony Higgins, Sophie Ward, Roger Ashton-Griffiths, Freddie Jones, Nigel Stock, Brian Oulton, Susan Fleetwood, Earl Rhodes, Patrick Newell, Donald Eccles, Walter Sparrow, Nadim Sawalha, Roger Brierley, Vivienne Chandler, Lockwood West, John Scott Martin, Willoughby Goddard, Ralph Tabakin, Nancy Nevinson, Michael Hordern	
D E C E M B E R	6	Fool for Love	The Cannon Group, Inc.	Robert Altman (director); Sam Shepard (screenplay); Sam Shepard, Kim Basinger, Harry Dean Stanton, Randy Quaid	
D E C E M B E R	6	Runaway Train	The Cannon Group, Inc.	Andrei Konchalovsky (director); Djordje Milicevic, Paul Zindel, Edward Bunker (screenplay); Jon Voight, Eric Roberts, Rebecca De Mornay, Kyle T. Heffner, John P. Ryan, T.K. Carter, Kenneth McMillan, Edward Bunker, John Bloom, Norton E. "Hank" Worden, Danny Trejo, Tiny Lister, Dennis Franz, Stacey Pickren, Walter Wyatt, Reid Cruickshanks, Dan Wray, Michael Lee Gogin	
D E C E M B E R	6	Spies Like Us	Warner Bros. Pictures	John Landis (director); Dan Aykroyd, Lowell Ganz, Babaloo Mandel (screenplay); Chevy Chase, Dan Aykroyd, Donna Dixon, Bruce Davison, William Prince, Steve Forrest, Tom Hatten, Bernie Casey, Charles McKeown, Vanessa Angel, James Daughton, Jim Staahl, Frank Oz, Terry Gilliam, Ray Harryhausen, Derek Meddings, Joel Coen, Sam Raimi, Martin Brest, Costa-Gavras, Bob Hope, B.B. King, Michael Apted, Larry Cohen, Heidi Sorenson, Edwin Newman	
D E C E M B E R	11	The Jewel of the Nile	20th Century Fox	Lewis Teague (director); Mark Rosenthal, Lawrence Konner (screenplay); Michael Douglas, Kathleen Turner, Danny DeVito, Spiros Focás, Avner Eisenberg, Hamid Fillali, Daniel Peacock, Holland Taylor, Guy Cuevas, The Flying Karamazov Brothers, Peter De Palma, Mark Daly Richards	
D E C E M B E R	13	Clue	Paramount Pictures	Jonathan Lynn (director/screenplay); John Landis (screenplay); Eileen Brennan, Tim Curry, Madeline Kahn, Christopher Lloyd, Michael McKean, Martin Mull, Lesley Ann Warren, Colleen Camp, Lee Ving, Bill Henderson, Jane Wiedlin, Jeffrey Kramer, Kellye Nakahara, Howard Hesseman	
D E C E M B E R	13	Legend	Universal Pictures	Ridley Scott (director); William Hjortsberg (screenplay); Tom Cruise, Mia Sara, Tim Curry, David Bennent, Alice Playten, Billy Barty, Cork Hubbert, Kiran Shah, Robert Picardo, Peter O'Farrell, Annabelle Lanyon, Tina Martin	
D E C E M B E R	13	Trouble in Mind	Alive Films	Alan Rudolph (director/screenplay); Kris Kristofferson, Keith Carradine, Lori Singer, Geneviève Bujold, Joe Morton, Dirk Blocker, George Kirby, Divine, John Considine, Albert Hall, Gailard Sartain, Robert Gould	
D E C E M B E R	18	Brazil	Universal Pictures	Terry Gilliam (director/screenplay); Tom Stoppard, Charles McKeown (screenplay); Jonathan Pryce, Robert De Niro, Katherine Helmond, Ian Holm, Bob Hoskins, Michael Palin, Ian Richardson, Peter Vaughan, Kim Greist, Jim Broadbent, Brian Miller, Sheila Reid, Simon Nash, Barbara Hicks, Kathryn Pogson, Bryan Pringle, Derrick O'Connor, Elizabeth Spender, Derek Deadman, Nigel Planer, Charles McKeown, Ray Cooper, Gorden Kaye, John Pierce Jones, Ann Way, Myrtle Devenish, Simon Jones, Bill Wallis, Don Henderson, Howard Lew Lewis, Oscar Quitak, Harold Innocent, John Grillo, Patrick Connor, Roger Ashton-Griffiths, Jack Purvis, Andre Gregory, Terry Gilliam, Sue Hodge	
D E C E M B E R	18	The Color Purple	Warner Bros. Pictures	Steven Spielberg (director); Menno Meyjes (screenplay); Whoopi Goldberg, Danny Glover, Oprah Winfrey, Margaret Avery, Akosua Busia, Adolph Caesar, Willard Pugh, Rae Dawn Chong, Larry Fishburne, Carl Anderson, Grand L. Bush, Dana Ivey, Bennet Guillory, James Tillis, Leonard Jackson, Desreta Jackson, Táta Vega, Gayle King	
D E C E M B E R	18	Out of Africa	Universal Pictures	Sydney Pollack (director); Kurt Luedtke (screenplay); Robert Redford, Meryl Streep, Klaus Maria Brandauer, Michael Kitchen, Shane Rimmer, Michael Gough, Suzanna Hamilton, Rachel Kempson, Graham Crowden, Leslie Phillips, Annabel Maule, Donal McCann, Benny Young, Iman, Jon Seda, Malick Bowens, Joseph Thiaka, Stephen Kinyanjui	
D E C E M B E R	20	A Chorus Line	Columbia Pictures	Richard Attenborough (director); Arnold Schulman (screenplay); Michael Douglas, Alyson Reed, Terrence Mann, Sharon Brown, Jan Gan Boyd, Gregg Burge, Tony Fields, Audrey Landers, Nicole Fosse, Vicki Frederick, Janet Jones, Matt West, Michael Blevins, Yamil Borges, Cameron English, Michelle Johnston, Pam Klinger, Charles McGowan, Justin Ross, Blane Savage	
D E C E M B E R	20	101 Dalmatians (re-issue)	Walt Disney Pictures	Wolfgang Reitherman, Hamilton Luske, Clyde Geronimi (directors); Bill Peet (screenplay); Rod Taylor, Cate Bauer, Betty Lou Gerson, Ben Wright, Bill Lee, Lisa Davis, Martha Wentworth, Frederick Worlock, J. Pat O'Malley, Thurl Ravenscroft, David Frankham, Mimi Gibson, Barbara Beaird, Mickey Maga, Sandra Abbott, Mary Wickes, Tudor Owen, George Pelling, Queenie Leonard, Marjorie Bennett, Barbara Luddy, Rickie Sorensen, Tom Conway, Ramsay Hill, Paul Wexler, Basil Ruysdael, Paul Frees, Lucille Bliss, Junius Matthews	
D E C E M B E R	20	Enemy Mine	20th Century Fox	Wolfgang Petersen (director); Edward Khmara (screenplay); Dennis Quaid, Louis Gossett Jr., Brion James, Richard Marcus, Carolyn McCormick, Bumper Robinson, Lance Kerwin, Herb Andress, Jim Mapp, Scott Kraft, Lou Michaels, Andy Geer, Henry Stolow, Danmar, Mandy Hausenberger	
D E C E M B E R	20	Ran	Orion Classics / Herald Ace / Nippon Herald Films / Greenwich Film Productions	Akira Kurosawa (director/screenplay); Hideo Oguni, Masato Ide (screenplay); Tatsuya Nakadai, Akira Terao, Jinpachi Nezu, Daisuke Ryu, Mieko Harada, Peter, Hisashi Igawa, Mansai Nomura, Jun Tazaki, Hitoshi Ueki, Yoshiko Miyazaki, Masayuki Yui, Kazuo Kato	
D E C E M B E R	25	Murphy's Romance	Columbia Pictures	Martin Ritt (director); Harriet Frank Jr., Irving Ravetch (screenplay); Sally Field, James Garner, Brian Kerwin, Corey Haim, Dennis Burkley, Carole King, Georgann Johnson, Anna Levine, Charles Lane, Bruce French, John C. Becher, Dortha Duckworth, Michael Prokopuk, Billy Ray Sharkey, Michael Crabtree, Henry Slate	
D E C E M B E R	25	Revolution	Warner Bros. Pictures	Hugh Hudson (director); Robert Dillon (screenplay); Al Pacino, Donald Sutherland, Nastassja Kinski, Dexter Fletcher, Sid Owen, Joan Plowright, Dave King, Steven Berkoff, John Wells, Annie Lennox, Richard O'Brien, Paul Brooke, Frank Windsor, Jesse Birdsall, Graham Greene, Robbie Coltrane	
D E C E M B E R	25	The Trip to Bountiful	Island Pictures	Peter Masterson (director); Horton Foote (screenplay); Geraldine Page, John Heard, Carlin Glynn, Richard Bradford, Rebecca De Mornay, Kevin Cooney, Dave Tanner, Gil Glasgow, Mary Kay Mars, Norman Bennett, Harvey Lewis, Kirk Sisco, Wezz Tildon, Peggy Ann Byers, David Romo, Tony Torn, John Torn, Alexandra Masterson, Don Wyse	
D E C E M B E R	27	Joey	New World Pictures	Roland Emmerich (director/screenplay); Hans J. Haller, Thomas Lechner (screenplay); Joshua Morrell, Eva Kryll	
D E C E M B E R	29	Head Office	Tri-Star Pictures	Ken Finkleman (director/screenplay); Judge Reinhold, Eddie Albert, Richard Masur, Rick Moranis, Don Novello, Jane Seymour, Wallace Shawn, Danny Devito	

== See also ==
- List of 1985 box office number-one films in the United States
- 1985 in the United States
