= Gary Howard Klar =

American actor (1947–2020)

- Klar in Day of the Dead, 1985
- Born: March 24, 1947; Bridgeport, Connecticut, U.S.
- Died: December 31, 2020 (aged 73); Connecticut, U.S.
- Occupation: Actor
- Years active: 1980–1995

Gary Howard Klar (March 24, 1947 – December 31, 2020) was an American actor. He was best known for playing Private Walter Steel in George A. Romero's 1985 cult classic zombie film Day of the Dead. He also appeared in the films Married to the Mob (1988), Big (1988), and Hackers (1995).

== Biography ==
Klar was born on March 24, 1947, in Bridgeport, Connecticut, and was raised by adoptive parents. He had 12 siblings all of whom were adopted too. He was not aware of his adoption until many years later. He played football in college and briefly played professionally but his career unfortunately ended after an injury. He later set out to become an actor. His first film was in 1980's Hero at Large in a small role as a camera man. His biggest role was that of Private Steel in the 1985 zombie horror film Day of the Dead. He continued to play minor roles in films such as Three Men and a Baby and Big, as well as appearing in the music video for the Cyndi Lauper song, "She Bop". On December 30, 1998, he received an unannounced phone call from a Connecticut state official informing him of his adoption for the first time. He was also told that his friend Steve, who he had known since they were young, was his biological brother and a woman he dated in youth was his biological sister. His story was showcased on many television shows including Dateline NBC and Good Morning America. Klar's last public appearance was on April 11, 2015, when he appeared at the Cinema Wasteland convention in Strongsville, Ohio, with fellow Day of the Dead cast and crew members Lori Cardille, Joe Pilato, John Amplas, Anthony Dileo Jr., Jarlath Conroy, Terry Alexander, Sherman Howard, Tom Savini, Phil Kellams and Taso Stavrakis at a panel to commemorate the 30th anniversary of the film's release.

== Death ==
It was confirmed on January 1, 2021, by the George A. Romero Foundation that Klar had died on December 31, 2020.

== Filmography ==
=== Film ===
Gary Howard Klar film credits
Year	Title	Role	Notes
1980	Hero at Large	Camera man	
1983	Trading Places	Longshoreman	
1985	Streetwalkin'	Bouncer	
1985	Day of the Dead	Private Walter Steel	
1986	Legal Eagles	Hit Man	
1987	Three Men and a Baby	Detective	
1988	Big	Ticket taker	
1988	Married to the Mob	Al 'The Worm'	
1989	Pink Cadillac	Randy Bates	
1989	Chattahoochee	Clarence	
1990	Cadillac Man	Detective Walters	
1990	Miami Blues	Head Bookie	
1990	Quick Change	Mario Monetti	
1995	Hackers	Mr. Simpson	

=== Television ===
Gary Howard television credits
Year	Title	Role	Notes
1985	The Equalizer	Purcell	Episode: "The Confirmation Day"
1995	Law & Order	Mountain	Episode: "Rebels"
2000	Law & Order: Special Victims Unit	Lt. Joey Poole	Episode: "...Or Just Look Like One"
