= Desperate Lives =

1982 American made-for-television film

- DVD cover
- Genre: Drama
- Written by: Lew Hunter
- Directed by: Robert Michael Lewis
- Starring: Tom Atkins; Diane Ladd; Doug McKeon; Helen Hunt; Diana Scarwid
- Music by: Bruce Broughton
- Country of origin: United States
- Original language: English

Production
- Executive producers: Arthur Fellows; Terry Keegan
- Producer: Lew Hunter
- Production location: William S. Hart High School in Newhall, Santa Clarita, California
- Cinematography: Joseph Biroc
- Editor: Les Green
- Running time: 96 minutes
- Production companies: Fellows-Keegan Company; Lorimar Television

Original release
- Network: CBS
- Release: March 3, 1982

Desperate Lives is a 1982 American made-for-television drama film about drug use in a high school. The film has a very strong anti-drug message.

== Plot summary ==
The Cameron family seems, on the surface, to be the perfect family, but things are not as they seem. Their two teenage children, Scott and Sandy, fall in with the wrong crowd at their high school and eventually experiment with drugs. Sandy, after ingesting angel dust made by her boyfriend in the school's chemistry lab, jumps through a glass window of the school (purposely cutting her arms with the shards of glass in the process) and is subsequently paralyzed from the fall.

A caring and idealistic guidance counselor, Eileen Phillips, becomes concerned with drug use in the school. Another incident involves Scott and his girlfriend smoking drugs and crashing their car off a cliff. When no one else on the staff is willing to do anything about it, Eileen takes the steps to deal with and confront the issue. The aftermath of this tragedy makes Scott and Sandy's parents realize that even their "perfect" kids can be affected by drugs, especially after Scott has a violent reaction and is admitted to the hospital.

At a school assembly, Eileen storms in and confronts the students about the increasing drug use, sending a message to the crowd about the effects of what the drug problem is doing to the kids and the tragedies that resulted because of it.

== Cast ==
- Diana Scarwid as Eileen Phillips
- Doug McKeon as Scott Cameron
- Helen Hunt as Sandy Cameron
- William Windom as Dr. Jarvis
- Art Hindle as Stan
- Tom Atkins as John Cameron
- Norman Alden as Coach
- Tricia Cast as Susan Garber
- Sam Bottoms as Ken Baynes
- Diane Ladd as Carol Cameron
- Grant Cramer as Steve
- Michele Greene as Julie Jordan
- Terry Alexander as Robert Walsh
- Dr. Joyce Brothers as Mrs. Watson
- Aggie Terry as Cindy
- Katherine Kelly Lang as Mary
- Susan McClung as Sarah
- Clayton Rohner as Monte
- Jenny Parsons as Olivia
- Mykel T. Williamson as Jack
- Jane Milmore as Jane
- Curt Ayers as Jesse
- Michele Laurita as Diana
- Glenn-Michael Jones as Al
- Joey Green as Howard
- Michael Cummings as Brad Davis
- Viola Kates Stimpson as Grandmother

== Production notes ==
- The theme song to "Desperate Lives" was written and sung by Rick Springfield.
- Some of the movie was filmed at William S. Hart High School in Newhall, Santa Clarita, California.

== Home media ==
Desperate Lives was released on DVD on April 21, 2010.

== In popular culture ==
When hosting a 1994 episode of Saturday Night Live as the star of Mad About You, Helen Hunt showed clips of her earlier acting career during her opening monologue. This included the scene from Desperate Lives where her character jumps out the window.

A Keyboard Cat video featuring clips from the film was uploaded to YouTube in 2009. However, it was later taken down for copyright reasons, because the video also contained the music video for "You Make My Dreams" by Hall & Oates.
