= Stream (film) =

2024 film by Michael Leavy

- Theatrical release poster
- Directed by: Michael Leavy
- Written by: Michael Leavy; Robert Privitera; Jason Leavy; Steven Della Salla
- Produced by: Steven Della Salla; Michael Leavy; Jason Leavy; Phil Falcone; Damien Leone; George Steuber; Marcus Slabine; Naresh Peter Menezes
- Starring: Jeffrey Combs; Charles Edwin Powell; Tim Reid; Dee Wallace; Wesley Holloway; Sydney Malakeh; Jason Leavy; David Howard Thornton; Liana Pirraglia; Mark Haynes; Daniel Roebuck; Mark Holton; Felissa Rose; Danielle Harris; Tony Todd
- Cinematography: Steven Della Salla
- Edited by: Michael Leavy
- Music by: Paul Wiley
- Production company: Fuzz on the Lens Productions
- Distributed by: Iconic Events
- Release date: August 21, 2024
- Running time: 123 minutes
- Country: United States
- Language: English

Stream is a 2024 American slasher film co-produced, co-written, edited and directed by Michael Leavy, and starring Jeffrey Combs, Charles Edwin Powell, Tim Reid, Dee Wallace, Wesley Holloway, Sydney Malakeh, Jason Leavy, David Howard Thornton, Liana Pirraglia, Mark Haynes, Daniel Roebuck, Mark Holton, Felissa Rose, Danielle Harris, Bill Moseley, and Tony Todd with a special voice cameo by Tim Curry. Stream is one of the final projects of Todd before he passed away later that year, and the final performance by Curry to be released prior to his own death in 2026. It tells the story of a family vacationing at a small hotel as its apparent owner unleashes four masked killers on them while live-streaming the activities.

Several crew members for Stream, including director Leavy, star Thornton, and executive producers Phil Falcone and Jason Leavy, were involved with the productions of the Terrifier films. Stream was financed in part by a crowdfunding campaign on the website Indiegogo. They raised over $180,000 from the support of horror fans around the world, using the hashtag #JoinTheStream to spread the word.

The film was released theatrically on August 21, 2024, and digitally on October 15, 2024. A sequel is in development.

== Plot ==
At a small hotel named The Pines Hotel, a masked figure abducts the owner Linda Spring.

Elsewhere, the Keenan family (father Roy, mother Elaine, son Kevin, and daughter Taylor) is in disarray after two police officers bust Taylor for stealing alcohol and warn her that she will be arrested next time. Roy and Elaine decide to go away for the weekend as a family, driving to The Pines Hotel. The apparent owner Mr. Lockwood lets them know that the hotel does not have any internet connection, even though cameras are being placed around the hotel.

At a bar, Taylor meets Theo and Louis, two French teenagers in town for a First to Eleven concert, but Elaine catches her.

In the hotel basement, a man wearing a plague doctor costume and computer gloves murders Linda with a power drill.

At night, Taylor sneaks out to hang out with Theo and Louis. She and Theo go to the hotel roof to smoke, where they kiss.

Mr. Lockwood activates a lockdown and sends out four masked killers: the enigmatic Player One, the brother/sister duo Player Two and Player Three, and the muscular Player Four. He turns out to be the pitboss of a murder game. However, the security guard Oswald "Ozzie" Hanson catches him, so he knocks Ozzie out. When Ozzie comes to, Lockwood reveals himself as the plague doctor and then stabs Ozzie to death.

Roy wakes up to find Taylor missing, so he and Kevin search the hotel. While they are gone, Player One sneaks into their hotel room and garottes Elaine. Roy returns to find Elaine's body and teams up with retired police officer Bernard Davidson to investigate, leaving Kevin in Bernard's locked hotel room. When they and other guests gather in the hotel courtyard, Lockwood announces to the guests what's happening: he's the organizer of a livestream in which the four players murder the guests while audience members bet on the outcome.

Despite the lockdown, Theo and Taylor sneak out of the hotel to a First to Eleven concert by leaving off the roof, unaware of the livestream.

The players arrive in the courtyard and murder several guests, then spread out throughout the hotel to murder others, including Louis. When one guest fatally stabs Player Three in the neck with a fork and escapes the hotel through a window, an enraged Lockwood retaliates and murders her.

Kevin hacks into Lockwood's system. Lockwood discovers him and heads to the room to kill him, prompting Kevin to run away. Player Four attacks Bernard and Roy when they return to check on Kevin, but Bernard shoots him dead after a struggle.

Meanwhile, Player One catches up with Kevin, but a security breach announcement calls all players to "the disturbance." The security breach is Taylor and Theo returning to the hotel. Player Two appears and impales Theo, driving him against a wall with Taylor pinned behind him. Taylor is injured and knocked unconscious, which appears to the audience that she suffered the same fate as Theo.

When Player One attacks Roy and wrestles him against a wall, Bernard abandons him to his fate. He sneaks into Lockwood's control room, revealing himself as a bettor who wants to win the game his own way. However, Lockwood is on to Bernard and kills him with a knife and a power drill for interfering with the Stream. Lockwood then announces that there is only one guest left (Kevin) and two players, so it becomes a one-on-one competition to hunt Kevin down and kill him. Taylor comes to and pushes Theo off her.

Disguised as Player One and still alive, Roy finds Kevin in the hotel kitchen. Kevin plays dead in Roy's arms so that they can escape, but Lockwood finds out on camera and warns Player Two that Player One is a guest. Player Two attacks Roy, but Roy sets him on fire by shoving him onto a stove and igniting it.

With all the players dead, Lockwood sets out to finish Roy and Kevin off himself. He finds them in the lobby, but Roy batters him with punches. Taylor shows up and impales Roy with the same spear used on Theo, mistaking him for Player One since he's still wearing the disguise. When Lockwood attacks her, she beheads him with a hatchet.

The next morning after the Stream, Detective Hart interviews Taylor and Kevin in the back of an ambulance. A paramedic delivers them drinks. Leaving, he checks a Stream app on his phone, revealing himself as a bettor. The app lists Taylor and Kevin as the winners. Another man using the identity of Lockwood tells the viewers to stay tuned for the next season, which shows that the Stream is much bigger than the Pines Hotel. He walks away from the car he was in that explodes while holding the same plague doctor mask.

In a mid-credit scene, the Atrium movie theater hosts another Stream. The Atrium players murder three moviegoers and knock out another, an older man named Bruce who is trying to get in to save a fourth person named Sofia. A player named Jimmy finishes off the victims with Sofia handcuffed and in a noose. This Stream's pitboss, a wheelchair-bound masked man using the Lockwood identity, joins Jimmy in explaining the Stream as Bruce is shown strapped to an electric chair. Lockwood has Jimmy murder Bruce and prepares to kill Sofia as he maniacally laughs.

== Cast ==
- Jeffrey Combs as Mr. Lockwood, the apparent owner of The Pines Hotel who is the orchestrator of the Stream activities there
- Charles Edwin Powell as Roy Keenan, the patriarch of the Keenan family.
- Tim Reid as Bernard Davidson, a retired police officer
- Dee Wallace as Linda Spring, the owner of a hotel
- Wesley Holloway as Kevin Keenan, the son of Roy Keenan
  - Vincenco Bianco as young Kevin
- Sydney Malakeh as Taylor Keenan, the daughter of Roy Keenan
  - Charley Thompson as young Taylor
- Jason Leavy as Player 1
- David Howard Thornton as Player 2
- Liana Pirraglia as Player 3
- Mark Haynes as Player 4
- Daniel Roebuck as Howard
- Mark Holton as Oswald "Ozzie" Hanson, a security guard at the Pines Hotel
- Felissa Rose as Donna
- Danielle Harris as Elaine Keenan, the wife of Roy Keenan
- Tony Todd as Future Lockwood, a man who is similar to Mr. Lockwood who organized the Stream.
- Tim Curry as the voice of Lockwood, a plague doctor-masked man in a Mount'n Mover wheelchair, a hooded coat, and computer gloves who is similar to Mr. Lockwood. An uncredited actor performed Lockwood.
- Bill Moseley as Jimmy, a player and minion of the third Lockwood
- Michael Leavy as Brad, the maintenance man at the Pines Hotel
- Dave Sheridan as Mark
- Tara Fitzgerald as Sara
- Sam Gonzales as Sebastian
- Bob Adrian as John
- Chris Guttardo as Mr. Welsh
- Isla Cervelli as Mrs. Welsh
- Phuong Kubacki as Amy
- Terry Alexander as Detective Hart, a detective who interviews Kevin and Taylor
- Damian Maffe as Fred Flemmich
- Bobby C. King as a bellhop
- Jennifer C. Johnson as a housekeeper
- George Loydgren as Officer Wilcox, a police officer who brings Taylor home to her family after busting her for stealing alcohol
- Gilbredo Acevedo as Officer Brusnwick, a police officer who brings Taylor home to her family after busting her for stealing alcohol
- Craig Loydgren as Lockwood's chauffeur
- Nehah Menezes as a Streamer
- Becky Boggs as Monica
- Stephen Hongach as a husband
- Serafina Leavy as a wife
- Al Cerullo as a helicopter pilot
- Michael Cantanzaro as a helicopter co-pilot
- Kimberley Crossman as the voice of AIVA
- Stephen Della Sava as a paramedic that arrived at the hotel and is also watching the Stream
- Allison Pittel as Sofia, a woman who falls victim to the Stream's operation at the Atrium Theater
- Terry Kiser as Bruce, an older man who tries to get into the Atrium theater only to become one of the Stream's victims
- Thomas Rickman as New Player 3
- Miche Brill as Buford
- Sarah Brill as Alexa
- Joey Ochoa as a victim at the Atrium Theater
- Jadon Cal as Theo, a French teenager that Taylor meets at the hotel bar
- Andrew Rogers as Louis, a French teenager and friend of Theo who Taylor meets at a hotel bar

== Production ==
Several producers and crew members for Stream were previously involved with the productions of the 2016 slasher film Terrifier and its sequel Terrifier 2. These include Stream director Michael Leavy, who appears in an acting role in Terrifier and serves as a producer and assistant director for Terrifier 2; David Howard Thornton, who played Art the Clown in the Terrifier films; Damien Leone, director of Terrifier and Terrifier 2, who served as the head of the special makeup effects department and a producer for Stream; Jason Leavy and Steven Della Salla, who played cops in the original Terrifier and Co-Producers on Terrifier 2. According to director Leavy, "We went right into production after completing Terrifier 2, with pretty much the same crew [...]".

In September 2021, director Michael Leavy stated that "over 90% of the movie is already shot and in the can. It's currently in post-production, but due to the [COVID-19] pandemic there were a lot of unforeseen expenses we didn't initially plan for in order to keep everyone safe and work efficiently." Leavy went on to say that he and his team "felt that this was the perfect opportunity to offer fellow horror fans a chance to come on board with them to help create something fresh and new for the horror genre". As a result, the filmmakers launched a crowdfunding campaign on the website Indiegogo to help finance the remainder of the film.

Tim Curry's involvement in the film was revealed on August 21, 2024, to coincide with the film's release.

== Release ==
In October 2023, a teaser trailer for Stream was released that included 2024 as the set release year for the film. In April 2024, it was announced that Stream would be released theatrically on August 21, 2024. Stream was released digitally on VOD October 15, 2024, following the theatrical release of the same production team's Terrifier 3.

=== Home media ===
The film was released on VHS from Witter Entertainment in February 2025.

== Reception ==
On the review aggregator website Rotten Tomatoes, 96% of 24 critics' reviews are positive, with an average rating of 6.6/10.

Dennis Harvey of Variety wrote, "At two full hours, Stream inevitably begins to feel overextended after a certain point — particularly when it reaches a coda that feels tacked on simply to cram in a few more guest stars. Still, this unabashedly derivative movie makes so little pretense of aiming for the qualities it lacks, you can hardly begrudge boilerplate slasher enthusiasts the fun they'll have with it."

== Sequel ==
In June 2025, it was announced that a sequel, Stream 2: Sudden Death, was in the works, set to be directed by Michael Leavy, produced by Jason Leavy and Steven Della Salla, with Salla also set as the director of photography for the film. The film is also set to star David Howard Thornton, reprising his role as Player 2. Tim Curry will be appearing in the sequel. According to Michael Leavy, Curry finished his work on the film before his death in August 2026, making it one of his final projects.
