= Richard Liberty =

American actor

- Born: Riccardo Liberatoscioli; March 3, 1932; New York City, U.S.
- Died: October 2, 2000 (aged 68); Dania Beach, Florida, U.S.
- Occupation: Actor
- Years active: 1973–1997

Richard Liberty (born Riccardo Liberatoscioli; March 3, 1932 – October 2, 2000) was an American film and television actor. His film work included George A. Romero's The Crazies (1973), The Final Countdown (1980), Porky's II: The Next Day (1983), and Flight of the Navigator (1986). Television appearances included roles on Miami Vice and Key West. He is probably best known for portraying Dr. Matthew "Frankenstein" Logan in Romero's Day of the Dead (1985), a part written for him specifically. Liberty died on October 2, 2000, in Dania Beach, Florida, at the age of 68.

His final interview, conducted by film historians Christian Stavrakis and Robert Telleria, may be heard as a supplement on the Anchor Bay Entertainment DVD and Blu-ray releases of Day of the Dead.

== Filmography ==
Year	Title	Role	Notes
1973	The Crazies	Artie	
1980	The Final Countdown	Lieutenant Commander Moss	
1982	Love Child	Police Officer #1	
1983	Cat and Dog	Policeman	Uncredited
1983	Porky's II: The Next Day	Commissioner Couch	
1985	The Mean Season	Mr. Hooks	
1985	Day of the Dead	Dr. Matt 'Frankenstein' Logan	
1985	Miami Supercops	Joe Garret	
1986	Flight of the Navigator	Mr. Howard	
1995	Just Cause	Chaplin	
1997	Virtual Weapon	Captain Holmes	(final film role)
