= Fandango (1985 film) =

1985 comedy film by Kevin Reynolds

- Theatrical release poster
- Directed by: Kevin Reynolds
- Written by: Kevin Reynolds
- Produced by: Tim Zinnemann
- Starring: Kevin Costner; Judd Nelson; Sam Robards; Chuck Bush; Brian Cesak; Suzy Amis
- Cinematography: Thomas Del Ruth
- Edited by: Arthur Schmidt; Stephen Semel
- Music by: Alan Silvestri
- Production company: Amblin Entertainment
- Distributed by: Warner Bros. Pictures
- Release date: January 25, 1985
- Running time: 91 minutes
- Country: United States
- Language: English
- Budget: $7 million
- Box office: $91,666

Fandango is a 1985 American comedy film directed by Kevin Reynolds. It was originally a student film titled Proof made by Reynolds while he was attending University of Southern California film school. It was a parody of Greek life at his alma mater, Baylor University. Due to his father's presidency at Baylor, though, he did not wish to portray the Baptist institution in an unfavorable light and gave it the alternative location as the University of Texas. The film is now a cult classic.

Steven Spielberg saw the film and helped fund a feature-length comedy/drama about five college students from Texas in 1971, who go on a "last road trip" together, celebrating the "privilege of youth" as they face graduation, marriage, and the draft for the Vietnam War.

Fandango stars Kevin Costner (in his first starring role, although an earlier film where he had been the lead actor, The Gunrunner had actually wrapped in 1983, but was not released until 1989), Judd Nelson, and Sam Robards. (Note: Costner had actually auditioned for a role in Proof, the original student film, but Reynolds had rejected him.) The soundtrack features an original score by Alan Silvestri and music by Pat Metheny and Lyle Mays, among others.

The film was released by Warner Bros. Pictures and Amblin Entertainment on January 25, 1985, and a DVD of the film was released on February 15, 2005. Fandango marked not only the directorial debut of Reynolds, but also the feature-film debut of Suzy Amis, previously known primarily for her work in modeling.

== Plot ==
In 1971, at a fraternity house on the University of Texas campus in Austin, a graduation party is going on. Gardner Barnes is a member of a clique called the Groovers, whose other members include Kenneth Waggener, engaged to be married, and ROTC geek Phil Hicks. Phil's parents arrive at the fraternity house in time to see Groover Lester pass out. They also meet the seminary student Dorman.

Kenneth interrupts the festivities by announcing his student deferment has expired and he is now to be drafted into the Vietnam War. Gardner's own notice came weeks before. Kenneth has decided to call off his engagement to his girlfriend on account of being drafted. The Groovers decide to celebrate their last days before the draft by going on a road trip, intending to visit a notorious roadhouse, then "dig up" someone - or something - named Dom near the Rio Grande. They drive all night before making a rest stop. Some, including Phil, resist continuing, but Gardner presses them on.

Phil's car runs out of gas and the Groovers must decide whether to walk to the nearest town or hitch. Phil is adamant about not leaving his car behind, when someone gets the idea to lasso a train passing on the railroad track parallel to the road. Dorman attaches the front bumper with fence cable to the back of the train, but the car's front end is pulled off, leaving the car in place. The Groovers push the car to a garage in the nearest town and eat at a Sonic Drive-In. They meet up with townie girls and eventually end up playing in a cemetery operated by one of the girls' undertaker father, where they come upon a fallen Vietnam War soldier's tombstone. They sleep at the former movie set of Giant.

The next morning, with the car repaired with a front end from a different make and model, the Groovers continue. Phil wants to go back, prompting Kenneth to shout angrily at him. Gardner confesses that they only let Phil hang with them because they felt sorry for him. Humiliated, Phil retorts that he will take on any challenge. The group sees a sign for a parachute school giving jumping lessons. Gardner cons the instructor, Truman Sparks, into giving Phil a free lesson. Phil is terrified, but goes up into Truman's aircraft. However, he is carrying Truman's dirty laundry instead of a parachute. The boys try desperately to warn him from the ground without success. Phil, however, manages to open an emergency chute with much prompting from Truman by walkie-talkie. The Groovers get a picture for their efforts.

After discovering the charred, abandoned remains of the roadhouse, the Groovers press onward. They eventually reach a bluff overlooking the Rio Grande and dig up Dom – which turns out to be a magnum of Dom Pérignon champagne. Each takes a drink before Gardner toasts to "freedom and youth." Kenneth starts having second thoughts about calling off the engagement. Pondering on the nature of love, Gardner decides to make things right. He calls Kenneth's girlfriend, gets her to reaccept the engagement, and arranges for Truman Sparks to fly her from Dallas to the border town and back. When they arrive, it is revealed that Kenneth's girlfriend is Debbie, Gardner's ex. Through some trickery, reminiscent of stone soup, he sets up a wedding for Kenneth and Debbie, as Lester regains consciousness. After the ceremony, Gardner and Debbie share one last dance, a fandango. As they finish, Gardner leans in to kiss Debbie. But she shakes her head, kisses him on the cheek, and walks away.

Phil then gives Kenneth and Debbie his car as a wedding present. Lester goes to hitch a ride "anywhere", and Phil and Dorman shake hands before parting ways. Phil says "Goodbye friend." Dorman says to his friend, "Have a nice life." Perched atop a cliff overlooking the town and watching the wedding reception, Gardner lifts a beer in salute to his friends. (Note: The action of saluting his friends, leaves the audience to wonder if Gardner has left without saying goodbye to travel on to Mexico, thus avoiding the draft; or has he left his friends to avoid the pain of their departure and the last "Groover adventure.")

== Cast ==
- Kevin Costner as Gardner Barnes
- Judd Nelson as Phil Hicks
- Sam Robards as Kenneth Waggener
- Chuck Bush as Dorman
- Brian Cesak as Lester Griffin
- Marvin J. McIntyre as Truman Sparks
- Elizabeth Daily as Judy
- Suzy Amis as Debbie
- Glenne Headly as Trelis
- Pepe Serna as Gas Station Mechanic
- Stanley Grover as Mr. Hicks
- Jane A. Johnston as Mrs. Hicks
- Marco Perella as Jester

== Production ==
Principal photography began in the spring of 1983 at a number of locations, primarily in Texas, including Alpine, Austin, El Paso, Fort Davis, Lajitas, Marathon, Marfa, Monahans, Pyote, Pecos, and San Elizario. Big Bend Ranch State Park in Texas (where Dom was located) and Tulsa, Oklahoma, were also prominent in the film.

The skydiving sequence in Fandango is shot-for-shot taken from Kevin Reynolds's University of Southern California thesis film, Proof, from 1980. Spielberg had seen a copy of Proof and offered to produce the project, which became Fandango, through his company, Amblin Entertainment. (Note: Proof can be seen as part of Reel Talent: First Films by Legendary Directors, released in August 2007.)

The supposed backdrop of downtown Dallas where Truman Sparks flies to is actually Tulsa, Oklahoma, in 1984. (Note: Marvin J. McIntyre, aka Truman Sparks, made his first skydive at Blue Sky Ranch in Gardiner, New York, in September 2007. McIntyre played the Parachute Club chief instructor (as "Head Jumpin' Bean" in Proof).) The aerial sequence was filmed with the assistance of the Commemorative Air Force (then known as the Confederate Air Force), which has its main headquarters in Texas. The screen credits note: "Special thanks to the Confederate Air Force for their assistance in making this motion picture."

== Release ==
Warner Bros. delayed the release of the film reportedly because the then-unknown cast made the movie "unreleasable". After viewing a completed cut of the film, Reynolds also noted script problems, and in March 1984, he was allowed a four-day reshoot.

The film was finally released by Warner Bros. in a limited release in New York City and Los Angeles on January 25, 1985. It earned a reported $50,437 from 27 theaters, and ultimately grossed less than US$100,000.

Spielberg was said to be disappointed with the finished film, though Amblin Entertainment is still credited as the production company. Spielberg admitted that the film "wasn't really released," but wouldn't say more than that. Asked to comment on Spielberg's hesitance to release the film, director Kevin Reynolds' agent simply responded: "He's tired of talking about Steven Spielberg, and he's busy."

== Reception ==
In her review of Fandango for The New York Times, Janet Maslin praised Kevin Reynolds' "way with the sight gags and off-the-wall humor that make this a notable debut. And he brings a good deal of feeling to the moments in which the film's twin specters – Vietnam and maturity – intrude upon the frantic festivities." The Globe and Mail also praised the direction: "Reynolds shows an uncanny confidence with the camera, a sureness which is backed up by a powerful visual sensitivity and an ear for language, especially the vernacular of Texas, where the film is set."

Leonard Maltin called Fandango "fresh and likeable, if uneven." Quentin Tarantino reportedly described Fandango as "one of the best directorial debuts" in the history of cinema, and is quoted as saying, "I saw Fandango five times at the movie theatre and it only played for a fucking week, all right?"

On the review aggregator website Rotten Tomatoes, 70% of 27 critics' reviews are positive. The website's consensus reads: "Occasionally held back by shaggy plotting and clunky sentimentality, Fandango manages to blend its familiar tropes with bursts of quirky situations and strong performances."

== Legacy ==
Modern reappraisals have focused on the storytelling and character development. Reviewer Bryan Pope critiqued the DVD version as, "Breezy and confident, and with a wing dinger of a soundtrack, Fandango is the definition of a sleeper. Before the final credits roll, its characters will have downed a few beers, faced fears, forged new friendships, tested old ones, and searched with some success for the answers to life's important questions. And, yes, one of them will even have danced the fandango under the Texas sky."

Fandango grew in popularity through television and home video, and in July 2010, fans held a 25th-anniversary celebration at the filming locations.

Reynolds and Costner later worked together on two more films, Robin Hood: Prince of Thieves (1991) and Waterworld (1995). (Note: Their collaboration in Waterworld actually resulted in the two parting ways over creative and personal differences.) Reynolds was Costner's uncredited second-unit director and set advisor for the Western epic and Costner directorial debut Dances with Wolves (1990). Reynolds and Costner collaborated once again on the History Channel mini-series Hatfields & McCoys (2012).
