= Day of the Dead (1985 film) =

1985 American post-apocalyptic zombie horror film by George A. Romero

- Theatrical release poster
- Directed by: George A. Romero
- Written by: George A. Romero
- Produced by: Richard P. Rubinstein
- Starring: Lori Cardille; Terry Alexander; Joe Pilato; Richard Liberty
- Cinematography: Michael Gornick
- Edited by: Pasquale Buba
- Music by: John Harrison
- Production company: Laurel Entertainment
- Distributed by: United Film Distribution Company
- Release dates: June 30, 1985 (Hicksville); July 19, 1985 (United States)
- Running time: 101 minutes
- Country: United States
- Language: English
- Budget: $3.5–4 million
- Box office: $34 million

Day of the Dead is a 1985 American post-apocalyptic zombie horror film written and directed by George A. Romero, and produced by Richard P. Rubinstein. The third film in Romero's Night of the Living Dead series, it stars Lori Cardille, Terry Alexander, Joseph Pilato, Jarlath Conroy and Richard Liberty as members of a group of survivors of a zombie apocalypse sheltering in an underground bunker in Florida, where they must determine the outcome of humanity's conflict with the undead horde. Romero described the film as a "tragedy about how a lack of human communication causes chaos and collapse even in this small little pie slice of society".

Work on Day of the Dead began shortly after the release of the previous film in the series, Dawn of the Dead (1978), but was halted when Romero began work on other projects. It was developed as part of a three-film deal with that film's distributor, United Film Distribution Company (UFDC); Romero elected to make the two other projects outlined in the deal, Knightriders (1981) and Creepshow (1982), first. Although the filmmaker was given final cut privilege, the screenplay was rewritten multiple times due to UFDC's concerns that Romero's ambitious original vision ― which he described as "the Gone with the Wind of zombie films" ― would need to be shot with the intention of receiving an R rating from the Motion Picture Association of America to ensure its commercial viability; Romero elected to make the film on a lower budget and release it without a rating. Day of the Dead was filmed in fall 1984, with above-ground scenes in the cities of Fort Myers and Sanibel and underground scenes near Wampum, Pennsylvania. Tom Savini returned to provide the film's special make-up effects; he was assisted by a team of artists that included Greg Nicotero and Howard Berger, who later became known for their work on the television series The Walking Dead.

Day of the Dead premiered in Hicksville, New York on June 30, 1985, and grossed $34 million worldwide against a budget of approximately $4 million. Although the make-up effects were praised, the film initially did not match the critical and commercial success of its predecessors; the series did not see another installment until the 2005 release of Land of the Dead. Reception of the film has improved with time, and Romero deemed it to be his personal favorite film in the original Dead trilogy. Like its predecessors, Day of the Dead has garnered a cult following and inspired numerous parodies and homages.

The film was remade twice: the first is the 2008 film of the same name, and the second is Day of the Dead: Bloodline (2017). A television series named after the film began airing on Syfy in 2021, while a stand-alone sequel, Night of the Living Dead II, was reported to be in active development.

== Plot ==
Seven years after the events of Dawn of the Dead, the zombie apocalypse has ravaged the entire world. The societal structures that used to safeguard civilization have mostly vanished, leaving the scattered remnants of human survivors vastly outnumbered by the zombie populations. A handful of scientists and soldiers live within a secure underground missile bunker in the Florida Everglades. The scientists are trying to find a solution to the zombie pandemic; the soldiers have been assigned to protect them. Dr. Sarah Bowman, soldier Private Miguel Salazar, radio operator Bill McDermott, and helicopter pilot John fly from their underground base to Fort Myers in an attempt to locate additional survivors. They find only a large horde of the undead and return to the base, where they are told that the military detachment's officer-in-charge Major Cooper has died. Sarah becomes concerned over Miguel's worsening mental state, but he lashes out at her until she stops trying to help him.

Dr. Logan, the lead scientist (nicknamed "Frankenstein" by the soldiers because of his grisly surgical dissections of the zombies), believes that the undead plague victims can be made docile and domesticated through training and conditioning. He keeps a collection of captive undead for use as test subjects in a large underground corral in the compound. Sarah vehemently opposes Logan's conditioning research; instead, she wants to search for a possible cure for the virus. Sarah discovers that Logan has been experimenting on the corpses of the dead soldiers, including Major Cooper. Fearful that the other soldiers will turn on them, Sarah reluctantly keeps this a secret.

The soldiers range from decent and workmanlike to mean-spirited and confrontational, especially the unstable Captain Rhodes. Rhodes vehemently objects to the dangers involved in capturing and maintaining zombie specimens, and tension between soldiers and scientists worsens in the face of dwindling supplies, the loss of communication with other survivors, and slow, uncertain progress in the research. During a meeting, Rhodes declares that he is establishing martial law under his command in the compound. He only grants the scientists "some" time to prove results and declares that he will execute anyone who interferes with his leadership. He also threatens to abandon the scientists and leave the compound, cutting off their protection from the undead hordes, though he cannot rebut Logan's sarcastic asides that the soldiers have nowhere to run to and no way to stop the zombies on their own.

Disturbed by Rhodes' threats, Sarah discusses the situation with John and Bill, who reside in an RV at the far end of the tunnels and bluntly tell her they do not believe in anything she and the scientists are trying to accomplish. John professes his conviction that the zombie plague is a form of divine retribution against mankind, and suggests that the three of them should take the helicopter, abandon the soldiers, and fly to a desert island somewhere where they could live off the land and start a new life. Logan hopes to secure Rhodes' goodwill by showing him the results of his research. He is especially proud of "Bub", a docile zombie who remembers some parts of his past life and engages in rudimentary human behavior. Rhodes, however, is not impressed and loses more patience with the scientists.

During a zombie roundup procedure, a zombie escapes its harness when Miguel loses his focus, resulting in the deaths of soldiers Miller and Johnson. Miguel snaps and attempts to kill the creature, but another zombie bites him on the arm. With John and Bill's help, Sarah amputates and cauterizes Miguel's arm to stop the infection. Rhodes calls off the experiments and demands that all captive zombies be destroyed, as well as denying any further help from him and his remaining men.

Sarah and Bill later go to the operating theater to gather medical supplies for Miguel, where they find that Logan has been experimenting on Miller and Johnson's remains. After discovering evidence that Logan has drifted into insanity due to his failure to civilize the zombies' baser instincts, Bill decides that they should leave in the helicopter immediately. Rhodes finds out that Logan has been feeding the flesh of his dead soldiers to Bub as positive reinforcement for his behavior. Furious, Rhodes kills Logan and seizes the remaining scientists and non-military personnel, stripping them of their weapons. Rhodes attempts to force John to fly him and his remaining soldiers away from the base, which John refuses to do. In response, Rhodes kills Logan's assistant Dr. Fisher, locks Sarah and Bill inside the zombie corral, and orders Private Steel to beat John into submission.

Back in the laboratory, Bub uses his newly developed intelligence to free himself from his chain restraints and later discovers Logan's corpse. In a display of human emotion, he mourns the loss of his instructor, then picks up a pistol and goes in search of revenge. Meanwhile Miguel, whose self-control has finally snapped, heads off to the surface. While the soldiers try to go after him, John knocks out Rhodes and Torrez, steals their guns, and goes into the zombie corral to rescue Sarah and Bill.

Outside, a suicidal Miguel opens the perimeter fence, letting in hundreds of zombies, which surround him on the missile elevator platform. As they begin tearing at him, he activates the elevator control box, lowering the ravenous zombies into the complex. As the undead swarm the bunker, Rhodes leaves his men behind to be killed. Chased by Bub, he desperately attempts to escape, but runs into a mass of zombies and is shot in the stomach by Bub, who mockingly salutes Rhodes as he is torn apart. John, Sarah, and Bill make it to the chopper and escape to a tropical island.

== Cast ==
- Lori Cardille as Dr. Sarah Bowman, a scientist researching the cause of the zombie outbreak
- Terry Alexander as John, the group's helicopter pilot
- Joseph Pilato as Captain Henry Rhodes, the military leader of the soldier
- Jarlath Conroy as Bill McDermott, the group's radio operator
- Anthony Dileo Jr. as Private Miguel Salazar, a soldier in a relationship with Sarah
- Richard Liberty as Dr. Matthew "Frankenstein" Logan, the group's main surgeon and scientist
- Sherman Howard as "Bub", a zombie taught by Logan to engage passively in human behavior
- Gary Howard Klar as Private Walter Steel, one of Rhodes' men
- Ralph Marrero as Private Robert Rickles, one of Rhodes' men
- John Amplas as Dr. Ted Fisher, technician
- Phillip G. Kellams as Private Miller, one of Rhodes' men
- Taso N. Stavrakis as Private Juan Torrez, one of Rhodes' men
- Greg Nicotero as Private Johnson, one of Rhodes' men

Featured as zombies in the film are Barbara Russell and director George A. Romero in an uncredited cameo appearance.

== Production ==
=== Development ===
Romero originally intended the film to be "the Gone with the Wind of zombie films". Following budget disputes and the artistic need to release the film unrated, the budget of the film was cut in half, dropping from $7 million to $3.5 million. This forced Romero to scale back his story, rewriting the script and adjusting his original vision to fit the smaller budget.

A total of five scripts were written as Romero wrestled with the film's concepts and the budgetary constraints. The first draft was over 200 pages, which he later condensed to a shorter page count. This is the true original script, and to date no copies of it have come to light. This version was likely rejected because UFDC felt it was too expensive for them to produce even with an R rating. Romero subsequently scaled down the scope of this script into a 155-page draft (often erroneously referred to as the original version), then condensed it again to a 104-page draft labeled the "second version, second draft" in an unsuccessful final attempt to get the story within budget parameters. When this failed, he drastically altered the original story concept and ultimately produced a shooting draft that numbered only 88 pages.

The film was given a very limited release. This is chronicled in the documentary The Many Days of 'Day of the Dead' on the two-disc Anchor Bay special edition DVD of the film. Some of the original concepts and characters remain, but the film differs greatly from Romero's original script, as stated by actress Lori Cardille:

He could've made me this sexy little twit bouncing around with a gun:- much more the sexual element. But he made her intelligent and strong. In fact, whenever I would try and make her a little more emotional, he would not allow me to do that.

=== Casting ===
Joseph Pilato was cast as Rhodes, the film's antagonist. As stated by Pilato "He pretty much just gave it to me. I don't know if he auditioned other people, but it was very quick. I came in and it was like, 'You got it!'". Pilato had acted in two prior films directed by Romero, the first being Pilato's debut Dawn of the Dead and the second being Knightriders; in between those films he played his first lead role in a film entitled Effects (1979). In an interview, Pilato was asked if Romero "had him in mind", Pilato stated that one of the reasons why he got the role was because of the budget being scaled down from 7 to 3.5 million.

The role of Dr. Matthew "Frankenstein" Logan was played by Richard Liberty. In a 2000 interview, Liberty said that he received a call from Christine Forrest, Romero's then-wife and casting director for Day of the Dead, wherein he was both offered the role and told that George Romero specifically wrote the role for Liberty. Liberty had previously worked with Romero on the 1973 film The Crazies.

Members of the rock band NRBQ cameo in the film in zombie makeup.

=== Filming ===
Filming took place in the fall of 1984 at locations in Pennsylvania and Florida. All above-ground scenes were filmed at several locations around Florida, where Romero was living at the time. The opening scene was filmed in the downtown area of Fort Myers.

== Release and reception ==
Subsequent to its theatrical release, the film has grossed over 30 million dollars worldwide. Day of the Dead would earn most of its gross revenue when the film was released internationally on VHS format, and later DVD and Blu-ray. This is in contrast to the film's poor box-office reception when it was released in cinemas.

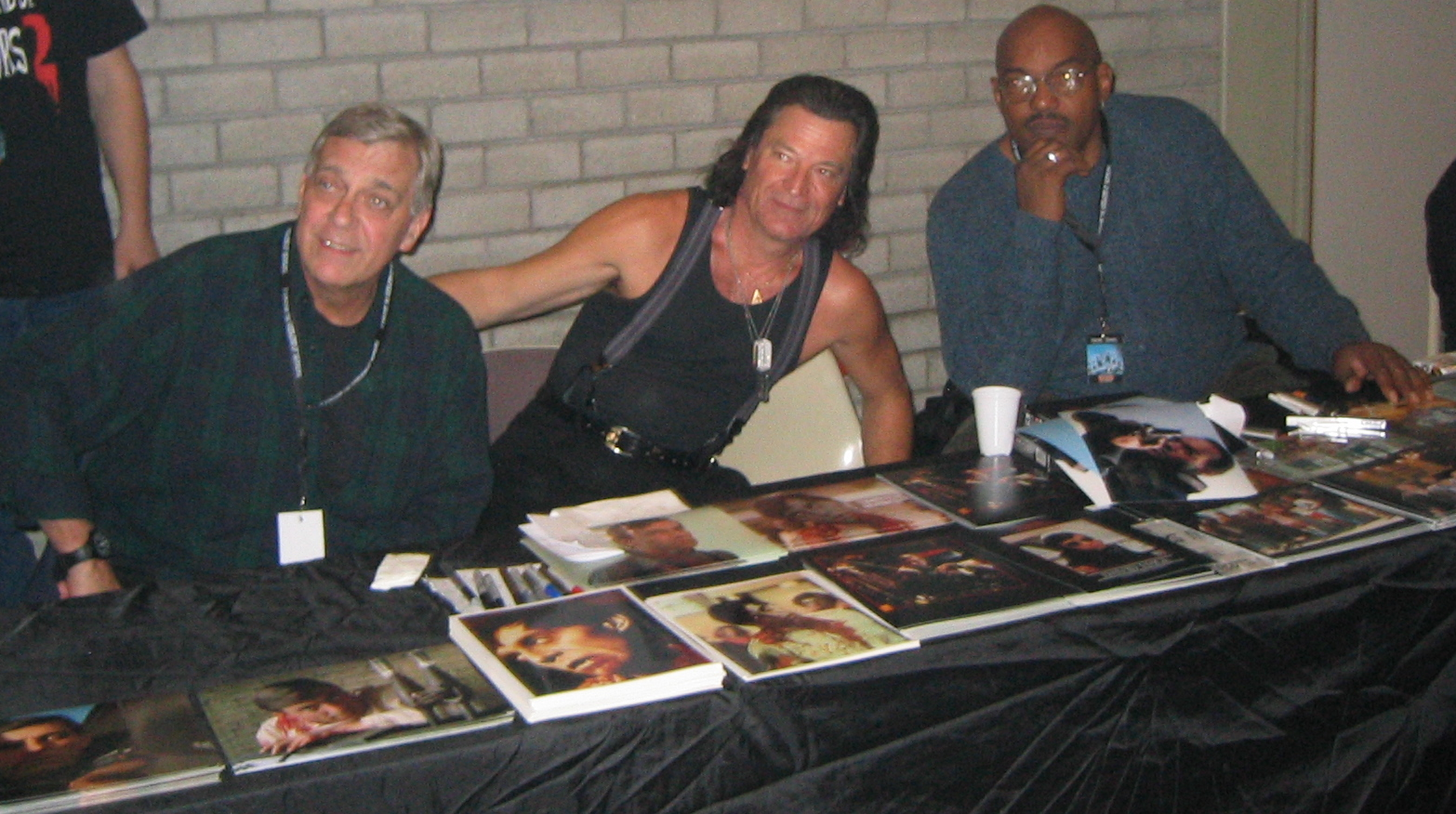
Ken Foree and David Emge from Dawn of the Dead and Joseph Pilato from Day of the Dead at a Dead series convention.

Based on 104 reviews collected by Rotten Tomatoes, Day of the Dead has a 62% approval rating, making it the lowest-rated film in Romero's original Dead trilogy, with Night of the Living Dead having a 95% approval rating and Dawn of the Dead having a 92% approval rating. The website's critical consensus states that "Day of the Dead may arguably be the least haunting entry in George A. Romero's undead trilogy, but it will give audiences' plenty to chew on with its shocking gore and scathing view of society". On Metacritic the film holds a score of 60 out of 100 based on reviews from 13 critics, indicating "mixed or average" reviews.

Day of the Dead had its world premiere on June 30, 1985, and was given a limited release on July 3, 1985. The film saw its wide release on July 19, 1985. Roger Ebert, who reacted favorably to other films of Romero's Dead series, gave Day of the Dead one and a half stars; he praised the special effects but was put off by what he referred to as "over-acting" in the film, specifically that all of the actors screamed at each other for the entire film in a way that was not present in Romero's earlier films. BBC reviewer Almar Haflidason stated "It benefits from a far larger budget than its predecessors, but suffers from a story as malnourished as the zombies that are chewing it up", Haflidason would go on to give the film three out of five stars. As noted by The New York Times reviewer Janet Maslin "Yes, there are enough spilled guts and severed limbs to satisfy the bloodthirstiest fan. But these moments tend to be clustered together, and a lot of the film is devoted to windy argument." AllMovie reviewer Keith Phipps stated that: "The last, to date at least, of George Romero's living dead films is in many respects the least interesting, although it's not for a lack of ambition." Variety wrote that the film was the most unsatisfying of the original three films and that "The acting here is generally unimpressive and in the case of Sarah's romantic partner, Miguel (Antone DiLeo Jr.), unintentionally risible." Dave Kehr praised the film in his review for the Chicago Reader, writing that "this time the focus is less political than philosophical. Beginning from a position of absolute misanthropy, Romero asks what it means to be human, and the answers are funny, horrifying, and ultimately hopeful."

Day of the Dead would peak at 23 on the Billboard chart Top VHS Sales in 1986 a year after its initial release.

The film grossed $5.8 million domestically. It fared much better internationally, grossing $28.2 million outside of the United States. Day of the Dead's total gross is a little over $34 million. The film is also noted for its special effects work, notably Tom Savini's make-up, he was honored with his second Saturn Award in 1985 for Best Make-up, the first time being with Dawn of the Dead in 1980. Jonathan Rosenbaum placed the film in his personal canon of 1,000 favorite films, one of two Romero films chosen by Rosenbaum (the other was Martin). Romero himself cited Day of the Dead as his personal favorite of his original trilogy of zombie films. On May 19, 2012, the film headlined the 12-hour film festival Hudson Horror Show V.

Alex Stewart reviewed Day of the Dead for White Dwarf #83, and stated that "Organized around a tough performance by Lori Cardille as the determined research leader, the movie is as much a study of the several inhumanities of science and the military as it is a feast of gore and putrefaction. After all, disembowelling is only one way, the most literal, of taking people apart."

=== Home video ===
The film was released on DVD on November 24, 1998 in the United States and on March 5, 2001 in the United Kingdom. Both the theatrical and an unrated director's cut were released as special editions containing identical bonus features, and the DVD was released in the United Kingdom in a region 2 DVD. The Blu-ray version of Day of the Dead was released on October 2, 2007. This edition includes many special features, including two audio commentary tracks with writer-director George A. Romero, Tom Savini, production designer Cletus Anderson, and lead actress Lori Cardille. There is also a second commentary with fellow filmmaker and self-proclaimed Romero fan, Roger Avary. It also includes two documentaries; the first one is entitled The Many Days of 'Day of the Dead', which focuses on the original script and the budget, it also included information about shooting in the Gateway Commerce Center. What is also mentioned is the casting details. The second documentary, entitled Day of the Dead: Behind the Scenes, focuses mostly on make-up effects. On March 29, 2010, Arrow Video released a 25th Anniversary Edition on Blu-ray exclusive to the UK.

Shout! Factory released the film under its Scream Factory label on September 17, 2013. The release is a Collector's Edition Blu-ray/DVD Combo Pack with newer artwork and special features. On July 18, 2025, Shout! Factory announced that they found the original camera negative, and will release a 4K UHD version of the film.

== Soundtrack ==
Day of the Dead

Soundtrack album by John Harrison
- Released: 1985; 2002
- Recorded: 1984–1985
- Genres: Rock; film score

The soundtrack was released on LP and cassette in the same year as the film (1985) by Saturn Records; it contained 6 tracks, all of which was composed and performed by John Harrison. The vocals came from Sputzy Sparacino who was the lead singer of the Pittsburgh R&B/dance/cover band Modern Man and Delilah, who was known at the time for being the lead singer of the Pittsburgh R&B/gospel/dance band Samson & Delilah on the tracks "If Tomorrow Comes" and "The World Inside Your Eyes". The album was re-issued in 2002 by Numenorean Music as a limited edition CD. The new edition was limited to 3,000 copies and contained the original album plus five additional tracks from the music and effects reel (the only surviving recording of the film score). It also included a 12-page booklet with information from Harrison and Romero regarding the score.

No.	Title	Writer(s)	Length
1.	"The Dead Suite"	Harrison	19:41
2.	"Breakdown"	Harrison	3:52
3.	"Escape Invasion"	Harrison	3:58
4.	"The Dead Walk"	Harrison; Sparacino; Blazer	4:54
5.	"If Tomorrow Comes"	Harrison; Blazer; Sparacino	3:39
6.	"The World Inside Your Eyes"	Harrison; Blazer; Sparacino; Pearsall	3:31
7.	"Deadly Beginnings"	Harrison	3:31
8.	"Diner of the Living Dead"	Harrison	3:44
9.	"Dead Calm"	Harrison	6:54
10.	"Bub's 9th"	Beethoven; Harrison	5:59
11.	"Dead End"	Harrison	3:34

Waxwork Records later released the soundtrack on vinyl in 2013, making it the first album release with the complete film score.

== Prequel, remakes and television series ==
A unofficial prequel was released in 2005, entitled Day of the Dead 2: Contagium. Although it is, by definition, an official sequel as Taurus Entertainment Company holds the rights to the original film, no one from the original Day of the Dead had any involvement in the film. The film also diverges from the continuity of the original in several respects.

A loose remake of the film, Day of the Dead, was released straight to DVD on April 8, 2008. Little of the original plot exists, with only a few basic elements remaining; notably the underground army base near the end of the film, and some of the characters' names. This marks the second time that Ving Rhames makes an appearance in a remake of a George A. Romero zombie film, following Dawn of the Dead (2004).

On July 10, 2013, it was announced that there would be another remake of Day of the Dead, titled Day of the Dead: Bloodline. Christa Campbell and Lati Grobman, two of the producers behind Texas Chainsaw 3D (2013) have obtained the rights. Campbell, who had a small role in the first remake, said, "We want to keep it as close to the Romero version as possible. These are not going to be zombies climbing walls and doing back flips like in World War Z." Directed by Hèctor Hernández Vicens, it began filming in June 2016. The film was released on December 29, 2017 in Vietnam and on January 5, 2018 in the United States, it was a critical failure.

In February 2020, a television series based on the film was announced and will premiere on Syfy in 2021. The series will follow six strangers in the first 24 hours of a zombie invasion and director Steven Kostanski confirmed the series will have a connection to the original 1985 film.

In July 2021, it was announced that Lori Cardille, Terry Alexander, and Jarlath Conroy were cast in Night of the Living Dead II, originally set for a 2022 release.

== Comic ==
Stef Hutchinson wrote the 24-page comic Day of the Dead: Desertion, which was exclusively released to celebrate the film's 25th anniversary and shows the origins of Bub, before becoming a zombie.
