= Chuck Bush =

American film director

- Born: New Orleans, Louisiana, US
- Occupations: Entertainment entrepreneur, actor

Chuck Bush (born c. 1962 in New Orleans) is an entertainment entrepreneur and actor who co-starred with Kevin Costner in Fandango (1985 film).

== Background ==
Charles R. Bush, III was born in New Orleans and "Chuck" grew up in Houma, Louisiana.

He graduated from Louisiana State University in music and theater.

== Career ==
Kevin Reynolds discovered him at an Austin 7-Eleven. Bush was cast as the hulking Dorman in Fandango.

In 1989, he started as creative director at WVLA-TV and in 1990, Bush moved back to Louisiana.

He founded Disruptive FX LLC and Indie Film Workshops.

As of 2024, Bush's F3 Films plans to produce "motion pictures in the Faith, Family, Freedom space."
