= Terry Alexander (actor) =

American actor

- Born: March 23, 1947 (age 79); Detroit, Michigan, U.S.
- Education: Wayne State University
- Occupation: Actor
- Years active: 1971–present
- Children: 1

Terry Alexander (born March 23, 1947) is an American actor. He is best known for playing the role of John in George A. Romero's film Day of the Dead (1985). He also played police commissioner Troy Nichols on the ABC soap opera One Life to Live (1990–1993).

== Early life ==
Terry Alexander was born and raised in Detroit, Michigan. He originally planned to become a dentist, but he eventually shifted his focus to acting. He attended Wayne State University, graduating with a Bachelor of Arts degree in theater.

== Career ==
In the 1960s, Alexander joined an African American theater group, earning fifteen dollars for each performance. He eventually began working in both theater and television. Alexander played Johnny Williams in the original Broadway production of Charles Gordone's No Place to Be Somebody. The play opened August 27, 1971. He was cast on the NBC soap opera Another World, playing the recurring role of Sgt. Zach Richards from 1972 to 1974.

He had an uncredited role in the film Death Wish (1974). In August 1974, Alexander appeared in the Off-Broadway play Naomi Court at New York's Manhattan Theatre Club. Alexander played Roger in the original Broadway production of David Rabe's Streamers. The play opened April 21, 1976. He appeared in the television mini-series King (1978), co-starring with Cicely Tyson. Alexander had an uncredited role in the film All That Jazz (1979). He had a recurring role on Hill Street Blues. He also appeared on Behind the Screen.

In 1982, he played Robert Walsh in the television film Desperate Lives. He also played Jason MacWilliams in the television film Benny's Place. Alexander guest starred on Fame. In 1984, he guest starred on Gimme a Break! and Benson. He played Peterson in the film Flashpoint (1984).

Alexander was cast as John in George A. Romero's Day of the Dead (1985). He guest starred on Hometown, Leg Work, and Amen. In March 1986, he starred as Earl in the Off-Broadway play Black Girl. Alexander appeared as Casey in the film House III (also titled The Horror Show) (1989). In March 1989, he starred as Vernard Jr. in the play Some Sweet Day at Connecticut's Long Wharf Theatre.

In 1990, he was cast on the ABC soap opera One Life to Live, playing police commissioner Troy Nichols. The role was initially meant to be recurring, but he was eventually signed to a contract. Alexander stayed on the show until 1993. In May 1993, he appeared as Mac in the play Playboy of the West Indies at New York's Mitzi E. Newhouse Theater. He appeared in the Hal Hartley film Amateur (1994). Alexander played The Founding Father in a production of The America Play in March 1994.

In April 1995, Alexander played Dady Jerry in Dancing on Moonlight at The Public Theater. Alexander appeared in the television film Cagney & Lacey: Together Again (1995). He guest starred on New York Undercover. Alexander appeared as Tuck in a production of Slaughter City. The play ran from March to April 1996. He played Duane in the film Hurricane Streets (1997). He also played Flip in the film Conspiracy Theory (1997).

He guest starred on Law & Order in 1999. Alexander appeared in the Sidney Lumet film Gloria (1999). He guest starred on The Education of Max Bickford in 2001.

In 2021, it was announced that Alexander would appear in the horror film The Dark Offerings. The film is the first socially distant feature shot entirely during COVID-19 quarantine. In 2024, he joined the cast of the horror film Stream.

== Personal life ==
As of 1992, Alexander was divorced and had one child, a son.

== Filmography ==
=== Film ===
Year	Title	Role	Notes
1973	The Werewolf of Washington	Guard	
1974	Death Wish		Uncredited role
1979	All That Jazz	Hospital Orderly	Uncredited role
1984	Flashpoint	Peterson	
1985	Day of the Dead	John	
1989	House III	Casey	Also titled The Horror Show
1990	Hot Hippo	Narrator (voice)	Short film
1994	Amateur	Frank, the Cook	
1997	Hurricane Streets	Duane	
1997	Conspiracy Theory	Flip	
1999	Gloria	Transit Cop No.2	
2016	Ihailed		
2019	The Last Call	Harry Cunningham	Short film
2021	A New York Minute	Frank	Short film
2021	The Dark Offerings	Dr. Mantis Tobogan	
2024	Stream	Detective Hart	

=== Television ===
Year	Title	Role	Notes
1972–1974	Another World	Sgt. Zach Richards	Recurring role
1977	The Andros Targets	Beanie	Episode: "Requiem for a Stolen Child: Part 2"
1978	King	Bernard Lee	Television miniseries 3 episodes
1979	Salvage 1	Firing Squad Officer	Episode: "Operation Breakout"
1980	Angel on My Shoulder	Luke	Television film
1981	Today's FBI		Episode: "Hostage"
1981; 1983	Hill Street Blues	Theo Monroe; Quincy	4 episodes
1982	Fantasies	Harold Johnson	Television film
1982	Desperate Lives	Robert Walsh	Television film
1982	Benny's Place	Jason MacWilliams	Television film
1982	The First Time	Chief Duty Officer	Television film
1982	Fame	Mr. Belmont	Episode: "Solo Song"
1983	Casablanca		Episode: "Divorce Casablanca Style"
1983	AfterMASH	Johnson	Episode: "Night Shift"
1983; 1984	Benson	Richie; Mr. Adams	2 episodes
1984	Gimme a Break!		Episode: "James Returns"
1984	Lace	Sir Douglas	Television miniseries 2 episodes
1985	Hometown		
1987	Leg Work	District Attorney Marner	Episode: "Things That Go Bump in the Night"
1988	Amen	Stage Manager	Episode: "Look at Me, I'm Running"
1990	Equal Justice	Freddy	Episode: "Cop's Story"
1990–1993	One Life to Live	Troy Nichols	Contract role: May 28, 1990–1993
1995	Cagney and Lacey: Together Again	Jacques	Television film
1995	New York Undercover	Dr. Crowley	Episode: "High on the Hog"
1996	NYPD Blue	Det. Bauman	Episode: "Moby Greg"
1999	Homicide: Life on the Street	Larry Moss	Episode: "Zen and the Art of Murder"
1999	Law & Order	Harry Gales	Episode: "Refuge: Part 2"
1999	Double Platinum		Television film
2000; 2001	Deadline	Jono; National	6 episodes
2001	100 Centre Street		Episode: "Hostage"
2001	Law & Order: Special Victims Unit	Security Supervisor	Episode: "Pique"
2001	The Education of Max Bickford	Gil Bryant	Episode: "In the Details"
