= Jarlath Conroy =

Irish theatre, film and television actor (born 1944)

- Born: 30 September 1944 (age 82); County Galway, Ireland
- Occupation: Actor
- Years active: 1971–present
- Website: jarlathconroy.com

Jarlath Conroy (born 30 September 1944) is an Irish theatre, film and television actor. Since 1971, he has become a successful actor appearing in film and television, including NYPD Blue, Law & Order: Special Victims Unit, and Law & Order: Criminal Intent. He also appeared in the films Day of the Dead (1985) and The Art of Getting By (2011). He is also the voice actor of Seamus in John Saul's Blackstone Chronicles (1998) and Aiden O'Malley in Rockstar Games's Grand Theft Auto IV (2008).

In 2016 The Yale Repertory Theatre mounted a production of Samuel Beckett's Happy Days with Jarlath Conroy as "Willie" opposite Dianne Wiest as "Winnie", it was directed by James Bundy. The production subsequently transferred to Downtown Brooklyn, New York's Theatre for a New Audience with Wiest and Conroy reprising their roles in April & May 2017.

== Selected filmography ==
- Heaven's Gate (1980) – Mercenary in Suit
- The Elephant Man (1982 television film) – Will
- Day of the Dead (1985) – Bill McDermott
- NYPD Blue (1994 television series) – School Teacher (Episode: Double Abandando)
- John Saul's Blackstone Chronicles (1998 video game) – Seamus (voice)
- Kinsey (2004) – Grocer
- Stay (2005) – English Man
- The Marconi Bros. (2008) – Irish Priest
- Grand Theft Auto IV (2008 video game) – Aiden O'Malley (voice)
- True Grit (2010) – The Undertaker
- The Art of Getting By (2011) – Harris McElroy
- Roadie (2011) – Wes, Motel Clerk
- Law & Order: Special Victims Unit (2011 television series) – Mr. Coogan (Episode: "Missing Pieces")
- Putzel (2012) – McGinty
- August Heat (2014 short film) – Charles
- The Knick (2015 television series) – The Hypnotist (2 episodes)
- To Keep the Light (2016) – Inspector of the Light
- The Ulysses Project (2022) – Barrister JJ Molloy / The Chemist
- Screamboat (2025) – Barry
- The Return of Steamboat Willie (TBA) – Bob
