= Turner & Hooch (franchise) =

American franchise

- Official franchise logo, as released in 2021
- Based on: Characters created by Dennis Shryack and Michael Blodgett
- Starring: Tom Hanks; Josh Peck; Various actors; (See detailed list)
- Distributed by: The Walt Disney Company
- Release dates: July 28, 1989 (Turner & Hooch); July 9, 1990 (Disney's Turner & Hooch)
- Country: United States
- Language: English
- Budget: $13,000,000 (Total of 1 film)
- Box office: $52,079,915 (Total of 1 film)

The Turner & Hooch franchise consists of American buddy cop-crime comedy-thrillers including three installments: one theatrical film, one television special continuation of that film, and one legacy sequel television series. The plot comedically revolves around schedule-regimented law enforcement officers, who are teamed-up with disorderly dogs during crime scene investigations.

Though the original film was met with a mixed response from critics, the film was a box office success and has since acquired recognition as a cult classic. The film is noteworthy, as the script cost The Walt Disney Company's Touchstone Pictures the most money at that point in time. The television continuation release was met with negative reception. The franchise continued with the Turner & Hooch television series in 2021. The show was met with mixed critical reception, with praise directed at Josh Peck's likability and its use of the canine actors, while criticism targeted its simplistic premise.

== Film ==
Film	U.S. release date	Director	Screenwriters	Story by	Producer(s)
Turner & Hooch	July 28, 1989	Roger Spottiswoode	Dennis Shryack & Michael Blodgett and Daniel Petrie, Jr. and Jim Cash & Jack Epps, Jr.	Dennis Shryack & Michael Blodgett	Raymond Wagner
Disney's Turner & Hooch	July 9, 1990	Donald Petrie	Stephen Metcalfe & Jeffrey C. Sherman	Stephen Metcalfe	Raymond Wagner, Terry Morse and Daniel Petrie, Jr.

=== Turner & Hooch (1989) ===
Organized, and orderly police detective Scott Turner attains ownership of a rambunctious French Mastiff named Hooch, when the latter's owner named Amos is murdered. As he tries to solve the mystery surrounding his friend's death, Turner begins to realize that Hooch was the only eyewitness to the crime. Over the course of their investigation, the pair form a bond and continue to follow leads. As they find the killer, presumed allies are revealed to be involved and guilty as well. Once confronted, a police shootout ensues with Hooch being shot and being critically injured. Despite this the dog takes a final stand and helps Turner apprehend the criminals. Turner rushes Hooch to his veterinarian girlfriend, though the animal appears to be beyond saving, and seemingly dies. (Note: This plot-point is retconned in the television special, where Hooch miraculously survived and continues to serve as the partner to Detective Scott Turner.) The couple reluctantly returns home, fending for Hooch and Rachel's dog's puppies; one of which especially reminds them of their beloved companion and pet.

=== Disney's Turner & Hooch (1990) ===
Filmed as an intended pilot for a spin-off continuation of the original film, the failed-to-be-ordered series' first episode was released as a made-for-television movie, as a part of The Magical World of Walt Disney instead. Retconning the original film's ending, Hooch is revealed to have survived a near-death injury. The plot revolves around the continued investigations of the titular duo, while Scott Turner and his recent marriage with Emily.

== Television ==
Series	Season	Episodes	Originally released			Showrunner	Writers	Executive producers
Series	Season	Episodes	First released	Last released	Network	Showrunner	Writers	Executive producers
Turner & Hooch	1	12	July 21, 2021	October 6, 2021	Disney+	Matt Nix	Matt Nix, Michael Horowitz, Lesley Wake Webster, Juliet Seniff, Steve Joe, Jackie Decembly, John Enbom, Jim Garvey, Christina Pumariega	Matt Nix, McG, Mary Viola, Michael Horowitz, Robert Duncan McNeill

In December 2019, a streaming series exclusive adaptation for Disney+, originally announced as a "reboot" of the franchise, entered development. Matt Nix serves as creator, writer, showrunner, and executive producer. The project entered development under the 20th Century Fox banner, a subsidiary of The Walt Disney Company following the purchase of 21st Century Fox by the latter. By February 2020, the project was ordered to series with Josh Peck signed on as the star of the show. The plot revolves around US Marshall Scott Turner inheriting an unruly dog, that he intends to train to be his partner on the force, following the unexpected death of his father. The series is a joint-venture production between 20th Century Television, ABC Signature, and Ostrich Productions. In February 2021, it was revealed that the series will serve as a legacy sequel, with Peck's character being the son of the role portrayed by Tom Hanks in the original film. A combination of five French Mastiffs collectively portray Hooch. The first season of the series will consist of a total of 12 episodes.

The first episode of Turner & Hooch debuted on July 21, 2021, with subsequent episodes released weekly thereafter. The series was cancelled by December of the same year, though it was being shopped around to other networks and/or streaming services.

== Main cast and characters ==
List indicator

This section includes characters who will appear or have appeared in the franchise in main roles.

- An empty grey cell indicates the character was not in the film, or that the character's official presence has not yet been confirmed.

Character	Film		Television
Character	Turner & Hooch	Disney's Turner & Hooch	Turner & Hooch The Series
Principal cast
Det. Scott Turner, Sr.	Tom Hanks	Tom Wilson	
Hooch	Beasley the Dog	Beasley the Dog	
USMS Scott Turner, Jr.			Josh Peck (Note: Uncredited actors portray young Scott Turner Jr. during flashback scenes.)
Hooch II			Various; French Mastiffs
DVM Emily Carson-Turner	Mare Winningham	Wendee Pratt	Sheila Kelley
Laura Turner			Lyndsy Fonseca
Matthew Garland			Jeremy Maguire
Supporting cast
Amos Reed	John McIntire		
COP Howard Hyde	Craig T. Nelson		
Zack Gregory	Scott Paulin		
Walter Boyett	J. C. Quinn		
former-Det. Mayor David Sutton	Reginald VelJohnson		Reginald VelJohnson
PO Jessica Baxter			Carra Patterson
Erica Mouniere			Vanessa Lengies
USMS Dir. James Mendez			Anthony Ruivivar

== Additional crew and production details ==
Film	Crew/Detail					
Film	Composer	Cinematographer(s)	Editor(s)	Production companies	Distributing company	Running time
Turner & Hooch	Charles Gross	Adam Greenberg	Mark Conte, Garth Craven, Lois Freeman-Fox, Kenneth Morrisey & Paul Seydor	Touchstone Pictures, Silver Screen Partners IV	Buena Vista Pictures Distribution Inc.	97 mins
Disney's Turner & Hooch	Charles Gross	Tom Sigel	Don Brochu	Touchstone Television Productions LLC	National Broadcasting Company	30 mins
Turner & Hooch (The Series)	Jeff Cardoni	Corey Robson & David Moxness	Steven Lang, Lance Luckey &Colleen Raferty	20th Television, ABC Signature, Ostrich Productions	Disney+	540 mins (45mins/episode)

== Reception ==
=== Box office and financial performance ===
Film	Box office gross			Box office ranking		Budget	Worldwide Total income	Ref.
Film	North America	Other territories	Worldwide	All time North America	All time worldwide	Budget	Worldwide Total income	Ref.
Turner & Hooch	$71,079,915	—N/a	$71,079,915	#1,152	#2,168	$13,000,000	$71,079,915	

=== Critical and public response ===
Film	Rotten Tomatoes	Metacritic	CinemaScore
Turner & Hooch	52% (29 reviews)	36/100 (17 reviews)	A−
Disney's Turner & Hooch	—N/a	—N/a	—N/a
Turner & Hooch (The Series)	57% (21 reviews)	49/100 (7 reviews)	—N/a
