= David Finfer =

American film editor (1942–2023)

- Born: June 7, 1942; New York City, New York, U.S.
- Died: April 3, 2023 (aged 80)
- Occupation: Film editor
- Years active: 1971–2016

David Finfer (June 7, 1942 – April 3, 2023) was an American film editor who was nominated at the 1993 Academy Award for Best Film Editing for the film The Fugitive. He shared the nomination with Dean Goodhill, Don Brochu, Richard Nord, Dov Hoenig and Dennis Virkler. The Fugitive (1993) was listed as the 39th best-edited film of all time in a 2012 survey of members of the Motion Picture Editors Guild.

Finfer had over 40 credits since his start in 1971. He died on April 3, 2023, at the age of 80.

== Selected filmography ==
Editor
Year	Film	Director	Notes
1971	You've Got to Walk It Like You Talk It or You'll Lose That Beat	Peter Locke	
1979	Real Life	Albert Brooks	First collaboration with Albert Brooks
1980	Defiance	John Flynn	
1981	Modern Romance	Albert Brooks	Second collaboration with Albert Brooks
1985	Lost in America	Albert Brooks	Third collaboration with Albert Brooks
1986	Soul Man	Steve Miner	First collaboration with Steve Miner
1986	Inside Out	Robert Taicher	
1987	Back to the Beach	Lyndall Hobbs	
1989	Warlock	Steve Miner	Second collaboration with Steve Miner
1990	Heart Condition	James D. Parriott	
1991	Defending Your Life	Albert Brooks	Fourth collaboration with Albert Brooks
1991	Bill & Ted's Bogus Journey	Peter Hewitt	
1993	Boxing Helena	Jennifer Lynch	
1993	The Fugitive	Andrew Davis	
1994	Exit to Eden	Garry Marshall	
1995	Fair Game	Andrew Sipes	
1997	Romy and Michele's High School Reunion	David Mirkin	
1998	Kissing a Fool	Doug Ellin	
1998	Simon Birch	Mark Steven Johnson	
1999	The Runner	Ron Moler	
2000	Snow Day	Chris Koch	
2001	Joe Somebody	John Pasquin	
2002	The Santa Clause 2	Michael Lembeck	First collaboration with Michael Lembeck
2004	Connie and Carla	Michael Lembeck	Second collaboration with Michael Lembeck
2005	Waiting...	Rob McKittrick	
2006	The Last Time	Michael Caleo	
2006	The Santa Clause 3: The Escape Clause	Michael Lembeck	Third collaboration with Michael Lembeck
2009	Infestation	Kyle Rankin	
2010	Tooth Fairy	Michael Lembeck	Fifth collaboration with Michael Lembeck

Editorial department
Year	Film	Director	Role
1993	Boxing Helena	Jennifer Lynch	Post-production coordinator

Second unit director or assistant director
Year	Film	Director	Role
1986	Inside Out	Robert Taicher	Second unit director

Direct-to-video films

Editor
Year	Film	Director	Notes
2006	Bachelor Party Vegas	Eric Bernt	
2008	The Clique	Michael Lembeck	Fourth collaboration with Michael Lembeck
2009	Still Waiting...	Jeff Balis	
2011	Sharpay's Fabulous Adventure	Michael Lembeck	Sixth collaboration with Michael Lembeck
2016	A Cinderella Story: If the Shoe Fits	Michelle Johnston	

TV movies

Editor
Year	Film	Director
1980	The Legend of Walks Far Woman	Mel Damski
1981	For Ladies Only	Mel Damski
1983	An Invasion of Privacy	Mel Damski
1983	The Fighter	David Lowell Rich
1983	I Want to Live	David Lowell Rich
1984	The Sky's No Limit	David Lowell Rich
2001	The Flamingo Rising	Martha Coolidge
2001	The Ponder Heart	Martha Coolidge
2011	Geek Charming	Jeffrey Hornaday
2013	Teen Beach Movie	Jeffrey Hornaday
2015	Teen Beach 2	Jeffrey Hornaday

TV series

Editor
Year	Title	Notes
2006	Emily's Reasons Why Not	Episode: "Pilot"
