= Turner & Hooch (TV series) =

2021 American action comedy television series

- Genre: Action-comedy; Buddy cop; Police procedural
- Created by: Matt Nix
- Based on: Turner & Hooch by Dennis Shryack & Michael Blodgett
- Starring: Josh Peck; Carra Patterson; Lyndsy Fonseca; Vanessa Lengies; Brandon Jay McLaren; Jeremy Maguire; Anthony Ruivivar
- Music by: Jeff Cardoni
- Country of origin: United States
- Original language: English
- No. of seasons: 1
- No. of episodes: 12

Production
- Executive producers: Matt Nix; McG; Mary Viola; Michael Horowitz; Robert Duncan McNeill
- Producer: Juliet Seniff
- Production locations: Vancouver, British Columbia, Canada
- Cinematography: David Moxness; Corey Robson
- Editors: Steven Lang; Colleen Rafferty; Lance Luckey
- Running time: 45–48 minutes
- Production companies: Flying Glass of Milk Productions; Wonderland Sound and Vision; 20th Television

Original release
- Network: Disney+
- Release: July 21 – October 6, 2021

Turner & Hooch is an American buddy cop action-comedy television series based on, and a continuation of, the 1989 film of the same name. The series, created and written by executive producer Matt Nix, serves as a legacy sequel and is produced in association with Flying Glass of Milk Productions, Wonderland Sound and Vision, 20th Television and Disney Branded Television, starring Josh Peck, Lyndsy Fonseca, Carra Patterson, Vanessa Lengies, Brandon Jay McLaren, Jeremy Maguire, and Anthony Ruivivar. It is the third overall installment in the eponymous franchise and premiered on July 21, 2021, as a Disney+ exclusive. The series was canceled after one season.

The series was removed from Disney+ on May 26, 2023, amidst a Disney+ and Hulu content purge as part of a broader cost cutting initiative under Disney CEO Bob Iger.

== Premise ==
U.S. Marshal Scott Turner Jr. inherits an unruly dog named Hooch, who may become the partner he needs. Together, the partnership, alongside the rest of the Turner family, discover that Turner's father's death may not have been accidental.

== Cast ==
=== Main ===
- Josh Peck as Scott Turner Jr., a buttoned-down and ambitious U.S. Marshal, the son of the late Det. Scott Turner Sr., who ends up inheriting an unruly dog.
- Arnie, Hammer, Obi, Cyd, and Mya as Hooch, the role is played by five different dogs of the same breed.
- Carra Patterson as Jessica Baxter, Scott's partner, whose personality is a "sharp contrast to his spit-and-polish ways", and who has a brave and quick-thinking personality while working, through whose sense of humor often leads her into trouble. As of "In The Line of Fur", she's placed on desk duty due to her pregnancy.
- Lyndsy Fonseca as Laura Turner, Scott's sister and a veterinary assistant, who brings Hooch to Scott while coming to terms with their father's death, as she ropes Scott into investigating it.
- Vanessa Lengies as Erica Mouniere, a dog lover and trainer at the U.S. Marshal K-9 facility with a crush on Turner, who agrees to train Hooch.
- Brandon Jay McLaren as Xavier "X" Wilson, a marine-turned-US Marshal, who develops a soft spot for Hooch in spite of being a cat lover. One of the office's most experienced members, he is described as "cool and enigmatic and a bit quirky".
- Jeremy Maguire as Matthew Garland, Laura's son and Scott's nephew. He is a dog lover, and becomes thrilled when Scott inherits Hooch.
- Anthony Ruivivar as James Mendez, a US Marshal Chief and Scott's boss, who respects Scott but initially is uncomfortable with Hooch, only to give him authorization to receive K-9 training after he helps solve a case.

=== Special guest stars ===
- Sheila Kelley as Dr. Emily Turner, Scott's mother and veterinarian. She was previously portrayed by Mare Winningham in the original film and Wendee Pratt in the 1990 pilot.
- Reginald VelJohnson as David Sutton, a former police detective partner of the late Scott Turner Sr. and now mayor of Cypress Beach. VelJohnson is the only actor from the original film to appear in the series.

=== Recurring ===
- Matt Hamilton as Trent Havelock, Senior Deputy Marshal to Scott Turner and doesn't much like dogs. He gets all the fame, all the glory, and all the great cases — everything Scott thinks he wants.
- Becca Tobin as Brooke Mailer, Scott's girlfriend and a prosecutor who downplays her status as part of a wealthy family of powerful lawyers. She is described as representing "everything Scott thinks he wants out of life".
- Paul Campbell as Grady Garland, Laura Turner's ex-husband and Matthew's father. He's a well-meaning small-town cop who peaked in high school and at this point probably has more in common with his 8-year-old than his ex.
- Cristina Rosato as Olivia, Xavier Wilson's fiancée and an Oakland cop from the Midwest. She's warm, earnest and enthusiastic — seemingly the complete opposite of her enigmatic soon-to-be husband.

== Episodes ==
No.	Title	Directed by	Written by	Original release date	Prod. code
1	"Forever and a Dog"	McG	Matt Nix	July 21, 2021	1DGA01
Following the death of his father, Deputy U.S. Marshal Scott Turner Jr. learns that his father left him a dog named Hooch, whose appearance and manners are remarkably similar to a dog his father adopted back in 1989. While Scott tries to adapt to having the chaotic dog in his life, he must also deal with trouble at work when a witness under his protection goes missing. With Hooch's help, Scott is able to track down the witness and impress his boss, who makes Scott and Hooch a K-9 unit for the Marshals. Later, Scott's sister calls him and reveals that their father was working a dangerous case before his death.
2	"A Good Day to Dog Hard"	Robert Duncan McNeill	Matt Nix	July 28, 2021	1DGA02
Turner and Hooch are assigned to babysit Kaya, the daughter of the head of the International Olympic Committee. While they are engaged in a tea party, a team of Russian criminals invade the hotel they are in and take several people hostage, including Baxter and Xavier, with intent to abduct Kaya for a ransom. It is up to Scott to protect Kaya and apprehend the criminals. Meanwhile, Scott and Laura dig into their dad's last case and find evidence that there may have been foul play involved.
3	"Diamonds Are Furever"	Jay Karas	Michael Horowitz	August 4, 2021	1DGA03
Scott gets excited when he gets a chance to take down notorious jewel thief Krista St. Jean and even more excited at the prospect of working with Trent and his T Squad. Hooch, however, proves to be a hindrance, when he fails to pick up Krista's scent when Trent and his squad could have caught her. Fortunately, Scott realises that Hooch failed to track Krista's scent because she was using a decoy. He and Baxter are able to track down the real Krista and, with the help of Hooch, arrest her, though Trent is quick to take credit for the arrest. Meanwhile, Laura keeps digging into her father's final case, despite both Scott's apprehension and his insistence that their father's files were unconnected.
4	"In the Line of Fur"	Gail Mancuso	Lesley Wake Webster	August 11, 2021	1DGA04
Scott volunteers as security for a court case that his ex-girlfriend, Brooke, is prosecuting but has to deal with a demanding older judge and also has to adjust to working with Xavier now that Baxter is on desk duty. Meanwhile, Laura turns to her ex-husband for help retrieving her father's case files but keeps getting distracted by his behaviour.
5	"Road to Smell Dorado"	Robert Duncan McNeill	Juliet Seniff	August 18, 2021	1DGA05
Scott and Laura investigate John Gillan's house but find it empty. Scott helps Xavier arrest a guy in El Dorado. They find a bunch of money in his house and investigate further. Laura learns that a girl from high school, Natalie Leeman, is John's secretary and invites her over to her house. Scott and Xavier investigate in a shop and an art store. They figure out that the money in the town is counterfeit and that the lady at the art store is helping the criminal they're supposed to capture and arrest them. Laura bonds with Natalie and learns the trouble she went through in school. She schedules a meeting with John, who says that Scott Sr. was searching for someone bigger than him.
6	"The Fur-gitive"	Betsy Thomas	Steve Joe	August 25, 2021	1DGA06
Scott accepts an invitation from Brooke to accompany her to a benefit and learns to ballroom dance with Erica. The U.S. Marshals track down a fugitive in the woods who's a former Special Forces operative after he assaults his landlord. Thanks to Hooch, Scott discovers the suspect has his own dog and refuses to abandon him, so Scott promises to take care of him and the suspect surrenders. Laura suspects David Sutton of having something to do with the death of her father, but soon learns he's also searching for answers.
7	"To Serve and Pawtect"	Craig Siebels	Jackie Decembly & Matt Nix	September 1, 2021	1DGA07
Brooke gives Scott an opportunity to be Deputy in Charge on a Senator's protection detail but none of his fellow deputies will work with him because he "jumped the line". On top of that, Hooch starts howling at random moments, leading to the dog becoming a media sensation but a hindrance to the case. Meanwhile, Laura continues to investigate her father's case but Grady tries to block her at every turn and Erica struggles with trying to tell Scott how she feels.
8	"Arf Appreciation"	Ali LeRoi	John Enbom	September 8, 2021	1DGA08
Scott and Hooch investigate a drug dealer's house and Hooch starts barking at a painting. The next day, the painting is vandalized and Hooch is blamed for the damage. Not believing that Hooch vandalized the painting, Scott does some research to prove Hooch's innocence, but Erica refuses to help him, and during Hooch's hearing, the judge is not convinced. Scott tells Jessica about Erica's behavior to which she says that she told Erica to do that because Scott was taking her for granted. Scott reconciles with Erica and she shows him how to find the dog's "fingerprint" on their nose. He finds another dog's noseprint on the painting that does not match Hooch's, and the executive who was helping search and catalog the drugs is revealed to be the person looking for the drugs. Hooch defeats him and is proven innocent.
9	"Witness Pup-tection"	James Genn	Jim Garvey & Matt Nix	September 15, 2021	1DGA09
When a protected informant is attacked by a hitman, Scott is assigned to question the only witness: an autistic boy named Anthony. Scott has trouble connecting with Anthony, but Hooch is able to break through, leading Scott to ask Erica to assist and the pair growing closer. Meanwhile, Laura learns that Scott Sr. was doing investigative work on his weekly outings with Matthew so she tries to recreate them to try and figure out what her father was onto. After a discussion with David about Scott's case in 1989 with the original Hooch, Laura learns that a local ice cream vendor is her next lead.
10	"Lost and Hound"	Robert Duncan McNeill	Christina Pumariega & Matt Nix	September 22, 2021	1DGA10
Scott and Xavier are assigned to transport a hacker across town, but Xavier is distracted by issues he's having with Olivia. Both problems are put on the back burner, however, when Erica's van is stolen with Angel inside and Erica becomes insanely determined to recover her. Laura and Scott discover that their father had uncovered an illegal dogfighting ring.
11	"Hooch Machina"	Shannon Kohli	Michael Horowitz	September 29, 2021	1DGA11
Scott presents Laura's and his investigation to the chief but he rejects it due to them having no evidence. He tells Scott that he relies on Hooch too much. Scott, Xavier and Hooch are chosen to protect a robotics lab. Hooch goes crazy whenever the employees turn on the drones and Scott goes to Erica who is clueless. He inspires Erica to host a party for those who saved Angel but Scott is unable to go due to Brooke's plans. He leaves Hooch with Laura as Hooch might jeopardise his job and is reluctant and sad about it. He later finds out that Hooch was sensing the pressure drop and was going crazy due to that, they find out that the security guard was stealing from the lab and capture him. Laura finds out that Walton adopted a dog named Nuke and paid a man to destroy his record. When asked about it, he makes up a story. Scott breaks up with Brooke and is going to get Hooch but spots some sports cars and asks Jessica to run the plates. He then finds dogs in a truck and is held at gunpoint by a man.
12	"Bite Club"	Robert Duncan McNeill	Matt Nix	October 6, 2021	1DGA12
When Scott fails to show up to retrieve Hooch, Laura shows up at Erica's party and fills in Erica, Baxter and Xavier on Scott Sr's investigation and Baxter mentions the cars that Scott had her look into. Enlisting the help of Grady and David, they go off in search of Scott. In the process, Xavier tries to get Erica to admit her feelings for Scott. Meanwhile, Scott finds himself locked up with Nuke, the missing pit bull, but shortly manages to break them both free. He leads his kidnapper on a chase through the woods before being recaptured. Fortunately, the Marshals, including Hooch, show up in the nick of time to save him before finally breaking up the dog fighting ring and closing their father's final case. Two months later, the whole gang comes together for Xavier and Olivia's wedding. Baxter encourages Scott to dance with Erica and they are just about to as Hooch attacks the wedding cake.

== Production ==
=== Development ===
In 1990, Touchstone Television developed a TV pilot based on the Touchstone Pictures film Turner & Hooch, with Thomas F. Wilson starring as Scott Turner and Beasley the Dog reprising his role from the film as Hooch. The pilot was not green-lit for a series order, and was ultimately aired as part of The Magical World of Disney in July 1990. A television series reboot developed by Matt Nix was announced to be in development for the Disney+ streaming service in December 2019, officially receiving a 12-episode order in February 2020; Josh Peck was cast as Scott Turner. That same month, Lyndsy Fonseca and Carra Patterson joined the cast, while Josh Levy was revealed to be co-executive-producing the series. On March 6, Vanessa Lengies joined the cast. In January 2021, it announced that McG would direct the pilot and also serve as executive producer. On December 2, 2021, Disney+ canceled the series after one season.

=== Casting ===
On September 22, 2020, the day filming began, Anthony Ruivivar, Brandon Jay McLaren, and Jeremy Maguire joined the cast in lead roles, while Becca Tobin joined in the recurring role. In January 2021, Paul Campbell was cast in the recurring role.

=== Filming ===
Filming for Turner & Hooch was originally scheduled to begin on April 27, 2020, taking place in Vancouver, British Columbia, Canada. Fonseca filmed the series concurrently with Fox's 9-1-1: Lone Star. Filming was delayed and began on September 22, 2020, and was scheduled to conclude on April 19, 2021.

== Marketing ==
A trailer for the series was released on June 23, 2021.

== Release ==
Turner & Hooch was initially announced to be released on July 16, 2021, on Disney+, and would release its 12 episodes weekly until October 1. However, on June 16, 2021, it was announced that after the success of the Wednesday release of Loki, Disney+ would be moving most of its original premieres to Wednesdays. As a result, Turner & Hooch was released on July 21, 2021. The Red Carpet Premiere took place in Los Angeles on July 17, 2021.

== Reception ==
=== Critical reception ===
On Rotten Tomatoes, the series holds an approval rating of 57% based on 21 critic reviews, with an average rating of 5.8/10. The website's critical consensus reads, "Likeable, but slight, Turner & Hooch features a mighty fine pooch, but those looking for more narrative meat may want to try a different bone." On Metacritic, the film has a weighted average score of 49 out of 100, based on 7 critics, indicating "mixed or average reviews".

Matt Fowler of IGN gave the show 6 out of 10 and stated, "Nothing feels dumbed down or muted, though the dog dilemma involving Hooch being thrust upon an unwilling owner feels like a questionable situation now instead of a light-hearted romp." Lucy Mangan of The Guardian rated the series 3 out of 5 stars, writing, "Josh Peck and his law-enforcing hound do their best to follow in the pawsteps of the Tom Hanks original, but this remake is all bark and no bite." Ashley Moulton of Common Sense Media gave the show 3 out of 5 and an '11+' age rating, stating, "Dog-loving teens may enjoy this show, which is relatively tame in most aspects besides the violence, but many will roll their eyes at the cheesy dialogue and storylines."

Joel Keller of Decider gave the series a mixed review and wrote: "We’re recommending Turner & Hooch mostly for the dog. He’s not quite as slobbery as the original Hooch, but he’s definitely slobbery enough to contrast with the fastidious Scott Turner. Without Hooch, the show is mostly a generic basic-cable mystery series; if it can’t develop better relationships between its characters, the dog will still be the only thing keeping us watching." Daniel Fienberg of The Hollywood Reporter gave the show a negative review and stated, "I'm not even complaining when I call Turner & Hooch a forgettable, one-joke series. It's hard to know what else it could have been." Brian Lowry of CNN gave the show a negative review and stated, "Even if Hooch sits at attention like a good dog, after a few episodes of Turner & Hooch, it's hard to share that patience or loyalty." Alan Sepinwall of Rolling Stone gave the show 2.5 out of 5 and stated, "It leans much too hard into the corny aesthetic of those kinds of lighthearted dramas, creating something too silly and childish for most adults, yet likely too old-fashioned for their own children."

=== Accolades ===
Jon Kralt was nominated for a 2022 Leo Award in the category Best Stunt Performance in a Dramatic Series for work in this series.
