= Turner & Hooch =

1989 buddy cop film by Roger Spottiswoode

- Theatrical release poster
- Directed by: Roger Spottiswoode
- Screenplay by: Dennis Shryack; Michael Blodgett; Daniel Petrie, Jr.; Jim Cash; Jack Epps, Jr.
- Story by: Dennis Shryack; Michael Blodgett
- Produced by: Raymond Wagner
- Starring: Tom Hanks
- Cinematography: Adam Greenberg
- Edited by: Mark Conte; Garth Craven; Lois Freeman-Fox; Ken Morrisey; Paul Seydor
- Music by: Charles Gross
- Production companies: Touchstone Pictures (Note: Released under the Walt Disney Pictures label in some regions.); Silver Screen Partners IV
- Distributed by: Buena Vista Pictures Distribution
- Release date: July 28, 1989
- Running time: 99 minutes
- Country: United States
- Language: English
- Budget: $13 million
- Box office: $71.1 million

Turner & Hooch is a 1989 American buddy cop comedy film starring Tom Hanks and Beasley the Dog (among others) as the eponymous characters respectively. The film also co-stars Mare Winningham, Craig T. Nelson and Reginald VelJohnson. It was directed by Roger Spottiswoode and co-written by Daniel Petrie Jr., who also served as an executive producer. Touchstone Pictures acquired the screenplay for Turner & Hooch for $1 million, which was the highest amount ever paid by Touchstone for any script at the time.

Turner & Hooch was released by Buena Vista Pictures Distribution on July 28, 1989. Despite earning mixed reviews, the film was a box office success and opened in the number 1 position, grossing $71.1 million against a $13 million budget. Following the film's success, it spawned a franchise, including a television movie sequel and a legacy sequel television series.

== Plot ==
Scott Turner is a fastidious police investigator in quiet Cypress Beach, California, preparing to transfer to a more exciting position in Sacramento. Showing his replacement David Sutton around town, Scott says goodbye to his longtime friend Amos Reed, before the two investigators are called to the discovery of $8,000 in cash at the beach.

That evening, local seafood magnate Walter Boyett has an employee killed for stealing a matching bundle of cash; hearing the commotion, Amos is fatally stabbed by one of Boyett's men. Amos' body is found, and Scott is forced to take custody of Hooch, Amos' pet Dogue de Bordeaux and the only witness to his murder. He tries to leave Hooch with the new town veterinarian Emily Carson, who insists that caring for Hooch will be good for Scott.

Hooch's noisy, destructive nature immediately clashes with Scott's fastidious lifestyle. Returning from buying dog food to find Hooch has completely ransacked his home, a furious Scott kicks Hooch out, only for the dog to return with Emily's collie, Camille. Scott brings Camille back to the veterinary clinic, where Emily invites him inside, and they redecorate her house together as their mutual attraction begins to flourish.

Scott takes Hooch to the police precinct, where a wedding is being held across the street. Hooch recognizes the wedding photographer as Amos' killer and gives chase. Although the man escapes, Scott identifies him as Zack Gregory, a Boyett Seafood employee and former Marine with several prior arrests; Amos' stab wound indicated that his killer had special forces training, and his regular complaints about suspicious activity at Boyett's factory lead Scott to suspect that the company is importing illegally.

Realizing that Hooch misses Amos and his old life, Scott begins to bond with the dog. He convinces Police Chief Howard Hyde to authorize a raid of the Boyett Seafood factory, but their search turns up empty. Frustrated by this dead end, Scott meets with Emily, leading them to spend the night together. In a eureka moment, Scott realizes that Boyett Seafood is not importing illegal goods, but somehow exporting illicit money.

Scott takes Hooch to stake out the factory, and David joins them with the $8,000 recovered from the beach. Hooch follows the scent of the plastic bag of money, leading them to find another identical bag. Tracking Zack Gregory to the Lazy Acres Motel, Scott questions the clerk but is captured by Gregory. He orders Scott into his Cadillac Coupe de Ville, but Scott crashes the car, propelling Gregory through the windshield, and interrogates him with assistance from Hooch.

Returning to the factory with Hooch, Scott is unexpectedly joined by Chief Hyde. Scott deduces that Hyde is in charge of Boyett's money laundering operation, hiding the bags of cash inside the blocks of ice that refrigerate the seafood shipments. Boyett ambushes Scott and a gunfight ensues, and Hooch subdues Boyett but is shot. Hyde kills Boyett and coerces Scott to help him pin everything on Boyett, but is bitten by Hooch; in the struggle for the gun, Hyde is shot dead. Scott races Hooch to Emily's clinic, where the mortally wounded dog dies on the table.

Some time later, Scott has been made police chief, with David as his lead investigator. Scott is married to a pregnant Emily, now caring for Camille and her litter of puppies, one of whom looks and acts exactly like Hooch.

== Cast ==
- Tom Hanks as Detective Scott Turner
- Beasley the Dog as Hooch
- Mare Winningham as Dr. Emily Carson
- Craig T. Nelson as Chief Howard Hyde
- Reginald VelJohnson as Det. David Sutton
- Scott Paulin as Zack Gregory
- J. C. Quinn as Walter Boyett
- John McIntire as Amos Reed
- David Knell as Ernie
- Ebbe Roe Smith as Harley McCabe
- Kevin Scannell as Jeff Foster
- Joel Bailey as Ferraday
- Mary McCusker as Katie
- Ernie Lively as Motel Clerk
- Clyde Kusatsu as Kevin Williams
- Elaine Renee Bush as Store Clerk
- Eda Reiss Merin as Mrs. Remington

== Production ==
Hooch's real name was Beasley, and he was a Dogue de Bordeaux (French mastiff). He had a stunt double named Igor, and Animal Makers created an exact replica of Hooch for the death scene. Beasley was born in a dog kennel in Merrimac, Wisconsin, owned by Peter Curley. Beasley was later purchased along with three other dogs for production of the film. The dogs were trained by Clint Rowe, who makes a brief appearance in the film as an ASPCA officer. Beasley died in 1992, aged 14.

It was rumored for years — and confirmed by their friend, actor and director Ron Howard in 2020 — that Henry Winkler, the original director, and Tom Hanks had a falling-out on the set which led to Winkler's replacement by Roger Spottiswoode. According to Winkler, he was fired thirteen days into the production by studio executive Jeffrey Katzenberg. Winkler said of his firing: "Let's just say I got along better with Hooch than I did with Turner."

Though primarily filmed in San Pedro, on locations scenes were also filmed in Monterey, Pacific Grove, and Moss Landing, California. "Cypress Beach" is fictional, using mostly Pacific Grove for shots such as the police department, the wedding foot chase, and the car chase down Ocean View Ave.

Hanks later said that Turner & Hooch was one of the more demanding experiences he had making a film because he had to act around the dog's reactions. In a 2001 interview with Larry King, Hanks recalled: "There's one scene in there, it's a stakeout scene. I'm staking out a scene of a crime with my dog Hooch. And we shot that scene for 16 hours with three different [cameras], they were always rotating. We had a car on the set that was surrounded by bungee-cams, literally cameras that were hanging from bungee-cords. And the whole thing was about, whatever this dog does, I react to. We will not ask the dog to do anything specifically, this dog will just do things".

== Reception ==
=== Box office ===
The film was a box office success, opening in first place at $12,211,042. It grossed a domestic total of $71,079,915 on a budget of $13 million.

=== Critical response ===
Turner & Hooch gained a mixed response from critics, with a 50% rating on Rotten Tomatoes based on 28 reviews. The critical consensus reads: "Tom Hanks makes Turner and Hooch more entertaining than it might look on paper, but ultimately, this is still a deeply silly comedy about a cop and a canine". On Metacritic, the film has a weighted average score of 36 out of 100 based on reviews from 17 critics, indicating "generally unfavorable" reviews.

Critics praised Hanks' performance, The Odd Couple-like plot, and the chemistry between the actor and the dog, with Michael Wilmington of the Los Angeles Times writing, "They work together with the seeming near-telepathic sensitivity of longtime vaudeville partners." He added, "One reason 'Big' worked well was the unself-conscious way that Hanks projects boyish qualities of enthusiasm, curiosity, petulance, candor, spontaneity. He really looks and acts like a kid at heart, and, in this movie, he looks like a fussbudget of a kid who needs a good, big, sloppy dog to warm him out."

The screenplay, which is attributed to five different writers, was criticized for its dissonant jumble of genres, including a buddy cop film, a man-and-his-dog film, a crime film, and a romance. Wilmington commented, "It’s good that 'Turner and Hooch' has this chemistry at its center, due to the actors and to Beasley's ingenious trainer, Clint Rowe, because it's another movie that seems stranded without a script, somewhere south of the last deal and east of the fifth rewrite."

Caryn James of The New York Times gave a mixed review but concluded: "Mr. Hanks is a brilliant understated comedian, who rises to the level of his best material, as he did in Big and who has the intelligence and charm to rise above his weaker roles. He is the best part of this film, first screaming at Hooch and threatening death, then getting so friendly he shares a bite of the dog's biscuit. He even tries a funny human version of Hooch's jowl-shaking. It isn't his fault that the five writers don't come up with five funny lines or one exciting scene." The film was also compared to K-9, another dog and cop buddy film that was released earlier that year.

In The Washington Post, Desson Thomson wrote, "We all know Tom's gonna warm up to that pooch Hooch, because in Hollywood a dog is always man's best friend. And Hanks, who can even grace a film such as 'The 'Burbs,' is always a movie's best friend." Variety wrote, "Until its grossly miscalculated bummer of an ending, Turner & Hooch is a routine but amiable cop-and-dog comedy enlivened by the charm of Tom Hanks and his homely-as-sin canine partner."

== In popular culture ==
Turner & Hooch has been referred to in various films and television shows, including the NBC/ABC medical sitcom Scrubs, in which main characters J.D. and Turk modify shift schedules so that Doctors Turner and Hooch are teamed up as a surgical team in the episode "My Faith in Humanity". In the episode, Doctor Turner was played by Jim Hanks, Tom Hanks' brother. Another episode had Turk offended at JD's assumption that Turner & Hooch was an interracial buddy movie, an assumption made based on the aforementioned Hooch.

In the second season of Castle, Beckett and Castle compare themselves to Turner and Hooch. This comparison returned in the Castle season 7 episode "Kill Switch".

During an appearance on Late Night with Conan O'Brien, O'Brien gave Tom Hanks a preserved dog skeleton, claiming it was his old friend Hooch. As one of O'Brien's first guests on The Tonight Show, Hanks improvised a song from an alleged Turner & Hooch stage musical. During the 2006 Academy Awards, Tom Hanks played in a segment about acceptance speeches that ran on too long. In his comedic lengthy speech, he thanked Hooch.

The 2014 Tamil film Naaigal Jaakirathai is based on this film.

== Lawsuit ==
In April 2015, actor Richard Dreyfuss and Christine Turner Wagner, widow of Turner & Hooch producer Raymond Wagner, sued The Walt Disney Company over profits from Turner & Hooch and What About Bob? (1991), a Touchstone release Dreyfuss had starred in. They accused Disney of refusing to allow a firm specializing in profit participation to audit the returns from the movies. Dreyfuss withdrew his claim a day later. Disney eventually allowed the audit to proceed. The auditors determined that Disney had made a profit of $32 million and that Wagner had been denied her share. Disney settled with Wagner in June 2018; the terms of the settlement were not disclosed.

== Television series ==
NBC made a television pilot based on the film in 1990. Though the show was not ordered to series, the pilot was released as a television film. It aired in the summer with another dog pilot, "Poochinski" under the banner, "Two Dog Night".

In February 2020, a new television series remake was announced to be greenlit for the streaming service Disney+. Matt Nix developed the series along with an order of 12 episodes. Josh Peck portrays the ambitious and buttoned-up U.S. Marshal Scott Turner who inherits a big unruly dog coming to realise that the pet he did not want may be the partner he needs. In the same month Lyndsy Fonseca and Carra Patterson joined the cast as Laura, Scott's sister, and Jessica, Scott's partner, respectively. On March 6, Vanessa Lengies joined the cast as Erica, the chief trainer of the K-9 facility. The Disney+ series premiered on July 21, 2021.
