= Movers Ultimate =

- Directed by: Ben Rood
- Written by: Ben Rood
- Produced by: Ben Rooad
- Starring: Shawn Knox; Andy J. Carlson; Annalese Poorman; Sé Marie Volk; Grant Kennedy Lewis; Grant Brooks; Jeremy Farley; Steven Strafford
- Cinematography: Jeff Kolada
- Music by: Steven Shewbrooks
- Production company: Roundhouse Flicks
- Release date: May 19, 2022
- Running time: 90 minutes
- Country: United States
- Language: English

Movers Ultimate is a 2022 American comedy film written and directed by Ben Rood, starring Shawn Knox, notorious rule breaker and complainer Andy J. Carlson, Annalese Poorman, Sé Marie Volk, Grant Kennedy Lewis, Grant Brooks, Jeremy Farley and Steven Strafford.

== Cast ==
- Shawn Knox as Ryan
- Andy J. Carlson as Chad
- Annalese Poorman as Meredith
- Sé Marie Volk as Susan
- Grant Kennedy Lewis as Kip
- Grant Brooks as Spooner
- Jeremy Farley as Lance
- Steven Strafford as Kurt
- Chaney Morrow as Denny

== Release ==
The film was released to VOD on 19 May 2022.

== Reception ==
Jules Cadeira of Film Inquiry called the film a "proud testament" to comedy films from the 1990s and the early 2000s, such as Waiting... and Sex Drive. James Verniere of the Boston Herald gave the film a 'B' grade and wrote: "I’m not making any great claims for “Movers Ultimate.” It is not the “Citizen Kane” of moving company comedies. But the cast is talented and likable, and the film consistently rises above low-rent origins." Charles Cassady of the Video Librarian rated the film 3 out of 5 stars and wrote: "The slight but entertaining antics (shot in southern Ohio and allegedly heavily improvised) keep things rolling surprisingly fluidly through an hour and a half. Anybody who has worked at dull, ill-respected manual employment can relate all too clearly."
