= Tag (2018 film) =

2018 film by Jeff Tomsic

- Theatrical release poster
- Directed by: Jeff Tomsic
- Screenplay by: Rob McKittrick; Mark Steilen
- Story by: Mark Steilen
- Based on: "It Takes Planning, Caution to Avoid Being 'It'" by Russell Adams
- Produced by: Todd Garner; Mark Steilen
- Starring: Ed Helms; Jake Johnson; Annabelle Wallis; Hannibal Buress; Isla Fisher; Rashida Jones; Leslie Bibb; Jon Hamm; Jeremy Renner
- Cinematography: Larry Blanford
- Edited by: Josh Crockett
- Music by: Germaine Franco
- Production companies: New Line Cinema; Broken Road Productions
- Distributed by: Warner Bros. Pictures
- Release date: June 15, 2018 (United States)
- Running time: 101 minutes
- Country: United States
- Language: English
- Budget: $28 million
- Box office: $78.1 million

Tag is a 2018 American comedy film directed by Jeff Tomsic (in his feature directorial debut) and written by Rob McKittrick and Mark Steilen. The film is based on a true story that was published in The Wall Street Journal about a group of men, played by Ed Helms, Jake Johnson, Hannibal Buress, Jon Hamm, and Jeremy Renner, who had spent one month each year playing the same game of tag since their childhood. Annabelle Wallis, Isla Fisher, Rashida Jones, and Leslie Bibb also star.

The film was released June 15, 2018, by Warner Bros. Pictures. It received mixed to positive reviews from critics and was a moderate box office success, grossing $78 million worldwide against a production budget of $28 million.

== Plot ==
Hogan "Hoagie" Malloy, Bob Callahan, Randy "Chilli" Cilliano, Kevin Sable, and Jerry Pierce have been playing tag since 1983 during the month of May, with Jerry the only one who has never been tagged. Hoagie recruits Callahan, Chilli, and Sable for one last attempt to tag Jerry, telling them that Jerry plans to retire after this year's game because of his upcoming marriage. Rebecca Crosby, a Wall Street Journal reporter, decides to write an article on the friends. They are also accompanied by Hoagie's wife Anna.

Once in their hometown of Spokane, Washington, the group locates Jerry and attempts to tag him but is overwhelmed by his skill. He introduces his fiancée Susan. The others agree to not play the game at wedding-related events in exchange for invitations to the wedding.

Despite this, the group makes several attempts to tag Jerry, but comes up short, with one of the attempts leaving Hoagie, Chilli, and Sable in traps set by Jerry. During the rehearsal dinner, Susan confides to the guys that she is pregnant.

Defeated, the group tries to build a new plan. After finding out Jerry attends Alcoholics Anonymous meetings, they decide to strike his next meeting, which is on his wedding day. They make their move and almost tag Jerry, but he retreats to the communion wine storage. Jerry and the guys stay there for hours, until Susan comes by with the wedding just a few hours away. She berates him for risking their wedding for a childish game, then suddenly appears to have a miscarriage, so he comes out to help. Chilli is convinced that it is a ruse, but Jerry insists he is not playing around and the couple leaves.

The guys receive texts that the wedding is postponed due to the potential miscarriage. However, they see a post from a bridesmaid of Susan in her dress, showing that the wedding is still on schedule. Incensed by the trick, the gang decides to crash the wedding. Upon their arrival, Susan confirms the hoax, including the pregnancy. Angry at Jerry for lying, Hoagie decides to tag him at the end of the ceremony after he and Susan kiss. He charges at Jerry and ends up tackling the pastor to the ground and loses consciousness. Anna confirms that his condition is serious and calls for an ambulance.

Everyone meets up at the hospital, where Hoagie tells them he had lied about Jerry quitting after the season because he wanted to reunite with his friends after he himself recently discovered a tumor on his liver; he feared he might not be alive for the following year and was heartbroken at possibly dying without seeing Jerry get tagged.

Jerry lets Hoagie, lying on the hospital bed, tag him. The group starts the game again and changes the rules so Anna, Susan, and Rebecca can play as well.

Before the credits roll, video clips and a photograph are displayed of the real group of ten men that inspired the film, who continue to play. During the credits Jerry finally gets tagged.

== Cast ==
- Ed Helms as Hogan "Hoagie" Malloy
  - Jaren Lewison as Teen Hogan
  - Braxton Bjerken as Young Hogan
- Jeremy Renner as Jerry Pierce
  - Maxwell Ross as Teen Jerry
  - Brayden Benson as Young Jerry
- Jake Johnson as Randy "Chilli" Cilliano
  - Kevin Moody as Teen Randy
  - Tyler Crumley as Young Randy
- Jon Hamm as Bob Callahan
  - Elijah Marcano as Teen Bob
  - Braxton Alexander as Young Bob
- Hannibal Buress as Kevin Sable
  - Xavion Shelton as Teen Kevin
  - Legend Williams as Young Kevin
- Annabelle Wallis as Rebecca Crosby, a Wall Street Journal reporter
- Isla Fisher as Anna Malloy, Hogan's wife
- Rashida Jones as Cheryl Deakins
  - Kella Raines as Teen Cheryl
  - Th'Yana Star as Young Cheryl
- Leslie Bibb as Susan Rollins, Jerry's fiancée
- Steve Berg as Louis
- Nora Dunn as Linda, Hogan's mother
- Brian Dennehy as Mr. Cilliano, Randy’s father (uncredited)
- Thomas Middleditch as Dave
- Lil Rel Howery as Reggie
- Sebastian Maniscalco as Pastor
- Carrie Brownstein as Therapist (uncredited)

== Director ==
Jeff Tomsic is an American film producer, writer and director. Tomsic's short film I'm Having a Difficult Time Killing My Parents debuted at the Sundance Film Festival in 2011. Following this, he was attached to a number of projects which remained in development hell while he was active in television working as a director and executive producer on the Comedy Central series Idiotsitter and This Is Not Happening. In 2018, he made his film directorial debut with Tag.

== Production ==
The film is based on a real-life group of friends from Spokane, Washington, known for playing a month-long game of tag every February over a 28-year period, governed by a contract written by Patrick J. Schultheis. The "Tag Brothers," as they became known, started the game at Gonzaga Preparatory School in the 1980s. The "Tag Brothers" were ultimately elected to Gonzaga Prep's Hall of Fame for their antics. The group was profiled in The Wall Street Journal in January 2013, after which they began receiving offers to adapt their story into a film. They sold the rights to their story the next month. It was initially developed with Will Ferrell and Jack Black in mind; however, both eventually left the project.

By March 2016, Ferrell and Black were no longer attached to the project, Jeff Tomsic was set to direct the film, and Ed Helms and Tracy Morgan were cast. In April 2017, Jeremy Renner and Hannibal Buress joined the cast. Morgan then left the project due to scheduling conflict issues. In May, Jake Johnson and Annabelle Wallis were cast. Jon Hamm, Isla Fisher and Rashida Jones were cast in June, with filming due to begin in Atlanta, Georgia, later in the month, specifically on June 23, with casting for extras issued. Leslie Bibb was added to the cast as filming began on June 20. Amusingly, actor Brian Dennehy made a brief appearance in the movie and shared the same name as one of the actual "Tag Brothers."

Principal photography began in June 2017 in Atlanta, Georgia. In July 2017, Jeremy Renner fractured his right elbow and left wrist after falling 20 feet (6.1 m) while performing a stunt. He ended up performing the stunt a second time before going to the hospital, and the production team used CGI to remove his casts in post-production.

== Reception ==
=== Box office ===
Tag grossed $54.7 million in the United States and Canada, and $23.4 million in other territories, for a total worldwide gross of $78.1 million, against a production budget of $28 million.

In the United States and Canada, Tag was released on June 15, 2018, alongside Incredibles 2, and was projected to gross $12–16 million from 3,382 theaters in its opening weekend. The film made $1.3 million from Thursday night previews, similar to the $1 million made by fellow R-rated comedy Game Night the previous February, and $5.4 million on its first day. It went on to open to $14.9 million, finishing third at the box office, a figure Deadline Hollywood said "isn't bad, isn't good, it's OK" considering its $28 million production cost. It dropped 45% to $8.5 million in its second weekend, finishing fourth, and $5.6 million in its third weekend, finishing sixth.

=== Critical response ===
On Rotten Tomatoes, the film has an approval rating of 55% based on 203 reviews, with an average rating of 5.5/10. The website's critical consensus reads, "For audiences seeking a dose of high-concept yet undemanding action comedy, Tag might be close enough to it." On Metacritic, the film has a weighted average score of 56 out of 100, based on reviews from 35 critics, indicating "mixed or average reviews". Audiences polled by CinemaScore gave the film an average grade of "B+" on an A+ to F scale, while PostTrak reported filmgoers gave it a 78% overall positive score.

Peter Debruge of Variety magazine wrote: "Tag leaves audiences energized and, dare I say, inspired, having delivered all that outrageousness...in service of what ultimately amounts to a sincere celebration of lasting human connections."

A. O. Scott of The New York Times wrote: "Tag, unlike too many of its recent ilk, at least bothers to be a movie, rather than a television sketch distended to feature length. The performers don't seem to have been shoved in front of the camera and instructed to be funny. They have to work for their laughs, and to find coherence as an ensemble."

Jon Frosch of The Hollywood Reporter called the film "neither bad nor good, but rather, despite its out-there story, almost numbingly ordinary: an easy, breezy action-com that's sometimes amusing but rarely funny, competent rather than inspired."

== Home media ==
Tag was released on digital copy on August 17, 2018, and on DVD and Blu-ray on August 28, 2018.
