= There Was a Crooked Man... (1970 film) =

1970 film by Joseph L. Mankiewicz

- Theatrical release poster by Bill Gold
- Directed by: Joseph L. Mankiewicz
- Written by: David Newman; Robert Benton
- Produced by: Joseph L. Mankiewicz
- Starring: Kirk Douglas; Henry Fonda; Hume Cronyn; Warren Oates; Burgess Meredith; Arthur O'Connell; Martin Gabel; Lee Grant
- Cinematography: Harry Stradling Jr.
- Edited by: Gene Milford
- Music by: Charles Strouse
- Distributed by: Warner Bros.
- Release dates: September 19, 1970 (France); December 25, 1970 (US)
- Running time: 126 minutes
- Country: United States
- Language: English

There Was a Crooked Man... is a 1970 American Western film directed by Joseph L. Mankiewicz and starring Kirk Douglas and Henry Fonda. It was the only western made by Mankiewicz. It was written by David Newman and Robert Benton, their first script after Bonnie and Clyde.

== Plot ==
In 1883, Paris Pitman Jr. and his crew enter the home of wealthy rancher Mr. Lomax, and rob him of $500,000 Lomax keeps in a safe disguised as a table. Watching the ensuing shootout between the crew and the Lomax family, Pitman kills a number of his own men, then flees. Now the lone surviving crewmember, he hides the loot in a nest of rattlesnakes in the desert. One night, a broke and despondent Lomax goes to a bordello, where he is a regular. Taking pity on him, the madam allows him to go upstairs to look through a peephole to watch two of her girls entertain a client—Pitman. Pitman is convicted and sentenced to 10 years at a penitentiary in the Arizona territory.

Pitman's cellmates are: two con men who attempted to fleece some parishioners; a young man who inadvertently killed his girlfriend's father with a billiard ball; an oafish yet hardened gunman who drunkenly shot a sheriff in the leg; a mute immigrant from China, reputed to be a homicidal maniac; and legendary train robber The Missouri Kid. The corrupt warden, LeGoff, is willing to let Pitman break out for an even split of the loot. Pitman agrees, but the plan goes awry when LeGoff is killed during an inmate uprising.

Woodward Lopeman (the sheriff who was shot by the gunman, which ultimately cost him his job) becomes the new warden. A reformist, he abolishes hard labor, restricts cruel punishment, and teaches the prisoners self-respect. Recognizing his leadership qualities, Lopeman has Pitman supervise the construction of a dining hall. All the while, Pitman cajoles his fellow inmates into breaking out by promising each man a share of the hidden loot. On the day the governor visits, Pitman makes his move, and sparks a riot as cover for his escape. Three inmates are killed in the melee, and Pitman himself does away with two more partners.

Pitman heads for the loot, with Lopeman in hot pursuit. As he retrieves the moneybags, Pitman is bitten by a rattlesnake. By the time Lopeman catches up, Pitman is already dead. Lopeman collects the money, as well as Pitman's body, and rides back to the prison. However, upon his arrival, he sends the mule with Pitman's body into the prison and then in a twist ending absconds to Mexico with the money.

== Cast ==
- Kirk Douglas as Paris Pitman Jr.
- Henry Fonda as Sheriff Woodward W. Lopeman
- Hume Cronyn as Dudley Whinner
- Warren Oates as Floyd Moon
- Burgess Meredith as The Missouri Kid
- John Randolph as Cyrus McNutt
- Lee Grant as Mrs. Bullard
- Arthur O'Connell as Mr. Lomax
- Martin Gabel as Warden Francis E. LeGoff
- Michael Blodgett as Coy Cavendish
- C.K. Yang as Ah-Ping
- Alan Hale Jr. as Tobaccy
- Victor French as Whiskey
- Claudia McNeil as Madam
- Bert Freed as Skinner
- Jeanne Cooper as Prostitute
- Barbara Rhoades as Miss Jessie Brundidge, the Schoolteacher
- Gene Evans as Colonel Wolff
- Pamela Hensley as Edwina
- J. Edward McKinley as The Governor
- Ann Doran as Mrs. Lomax

== Production ==
Location filming took place at Joshua Tree National Park, where an 1880s prison set spanning 4 acres was constructed over seven weeks at a cost of $300,000. Further shooting was done at Old Tucson Studios in Arizona and at Warner Bros.-Seven Arts studio in Burbank, California. During production, Mankiewicz suffered a slipped disc in his spine in an accident at his home and had to direct from a motorized wheelchair for a time.

== Reception ==
Vincent Canby of The New York Times was generally positive: "Although There Was A Crooked Man... is rather low-keyed and takes its own sweet time to reveal itself, it is a movie of the sort of taste, intelligence and somewhat bitter humor I associate with Mr. Mankiewicz who, in real life, is one of America's most sophisticated, least folksy raconteurs, especially of stories about the old Hollywood." Variety wrote that the cast of stars, Newman and Benton's script and director/producer Mankiewicz "are the formidable elements that don't jell in this picaresque tale set in a bleak western desert prison. It is the type of action drama in which neither the actors nor director appear to believe the script or characters, opt for the broadness euphemistically termed 'entertainment,' and which makes its best boxoffice in multiples exploiting the cast and elements." Gene Siskel of the Chicago Tribune gave the film 3 stars out of 4 and wrote, "While the film meanders between satire and straight melodrama it is unified by the wit of Mankiewicz." Charles Champlin of the Los Angeles Times stated that the film "never develops enough straight-ahead power. It plays in the end like an interminable and very private shaggy dog story, whose embellishments are intermittently interesting but whose punch line can't carry the wait of buildup." Gary Arnold of The Washington Post called it "a middling and rather sluggish prison melodrama" with a script that "has some of the crotchety and incongruous humor of 'Bonnie and Clyde,' but this time around Newman and Benton seem seriously deficient in their sympathy for their major characters." Tom Milne of The Monthly Film Bulletin wrote, "Although There Was a Crooked Man ultimately confirms the old dictum that a Mankiewicz script is always better than his direction, the gap is not too severe in this case and there is a good deal of civilised enjoyment, both visual and verbal, to be had by the way."

The film holds a score of 82% on Rotten Tomatoes based on 11 reviews.

== See also ==
- List of American films of 1970
