= Still Waiting... =

- DVD cover
- Directed by: Jeff Balis
- Written by: Rob McKittrick
- Based on: Characters by Rob McKittrick
- Produced by: Jay Rifkin
- Starring: John Michael Higgins; Rob Benedict; Steve Howey; Rob Kerkovich; Andy Milonakis; Alanna Ubach; Chris Williams; Max Kasch; Vanessa Lengies; Chi McBride; Luis Guzman; Adam Carolla
- Cinematography: Thomas L. Callaway
- Edited by: David Finfer
- Music by: Adam Gorgoni
- Production company: TD Philostrate
- Distributed by: Lionsgate Home Entertainment
- Release date: February 17, 2009
- Running time: 88 minutes
- Country: United States
- Language: English

Still Waiting... is a 2009 American independent comedy film directed by Jeff Balis and starring John Michael Higgins and Robert Patrick Benedict. It is the sequel to Waiting... (2005). Some of the cast of the original film appear in the sequel. Adam Carolla and Justin Long appear in cameo roles. It was written by Rob McKittrick, who wrote and directed the original film.

== Plot ==
On the last night of the fiscal quarter, Dennis, manager of Shenaniganz, will be promoted to district manager if the restaurant sells $9,000 worth of food or more. To motivate the crew, Dennis tells them that the restaurant will close if they do not meet this goal. Their biggest competition is next door: Ta-Ta's, a bar with scantily clad waitresses, managed by the self-confident Calvin. At Ta-Ta's, it is Allison's first day; she is nervous. At Shenanigan's, Mason, a cook, is trying his best to be cool, without success. As the shift wears on, each employee faces his worst fears, and Dennis tries to learn how to attract women. Next door, Calvin and Allison make self-discoveries.

== Cast ==
- Adam Carolla as Ken Halsband
- John Michael Higgins as Dennis
- Rob Benedict as Calvin
- Steve Howey as Agnew
- Rob Kerkovich as Mason
- Andy Milonakis as Nick
- Alanna Ubach as Naomi
- Phillip Vaden as Joshua
- Chris Williams as Chuck
- Chi McBride as Bishop Coleman
- Luis Guzmán as Raddimus
- Max Kasch as Theo
- Vanessa Lengies as Natasha
- Kirk Fox as Hank
- Amanda Loncar as Suzy
- Tania Raymonde as Amber
- K.D. Aubert as Trina
- Danneel Harris as Sherry
- Janet Varney as Haley
- Erin Foster as Kristy
- Maggie Lawson as Allison
- Rocco Botte as Jack
- Missi Pyle as Rocky Rhoades
- David Koechner as Dan
- Justin Long as Dean

== Release ==
The film was released directly to DVD. Justin Long, who starred in the first film, would later say that he was "truly embarrassed" to be involved with Still Waiting... (via his cameo) in an interview with Peter Travers of Rolling Stone. "It's offensive. I think it's offensive."

== Reception ==
Rotten Tomatoes has two critical reviews, both negative.
