= Dennis Shryack =

American film producer

- Born: August 25, 1936; Duluth, Minnesota, U.S.
- Died: September 14, 2016 (aged 80); Duluth, Minnesota, U.S.
- Occupations: Screenwriter, singer

Dennis Shryack (August 25, 1936 – September 14, 2016) was an American screenwriter.

Born and raised in Duluth, Minnesota, Shryack began his career as a singer in the Escorts quartet, which toured as an opening act for well-known artists such as Sammy Davis Jr. and Sophie Tucker. Following his time with the Escorts, Shryack was hired as a mailroom worker at Universal Pictures.

Shryack's first produced screenplay was for the 1969 Western comedy film, The Good Guys and the Bad Guys, which he co-wrote and co-produced with Ronald M. Cohen. His second film, the 1977 thriller The Car, starred James Brolin and Kathleen Lloyd.

Shryack wrote for a variety of stars, such as Chuck Norris (two films) and Clint Eastwood (two films), most notably co-writing the screenplay for Pale Rider in 1985, directed by Clint Eastwood, which became one of the highest grossing Western films of the 1980s, taking in the $41 million (the equivalent of nearly $92 million in 2016). Shryack often collaborated on screenplays with other writers, including penning six films with Michael Butler, as well as partnerships with Michael Blodgett on Turner & Hooch and Run in 1991.

Some of Shryack's other credits include Flashpoint (1984), which starred Kris Kristofferson, Treat Williams, and Rip Torn; 1987's Rent-a-Cop with Michael Blodgett, starring Burt Reynolds and Liza Minnelli; and Cadence (1990), which starred Charlie Sheen and was directed by Martin Sheen.

Shryack successfully negotiated for $1 million for the script he co-wrote for Turner & Hooch (1989), which was the highest price ever paid for a screenplay by Touchstone Pictures at the time. He later became a literary agent and returned to his hometown of Duluth.

Shryack died from congestive heart failure in Duluth on September 14, 2016, at the age of 80. He was survived by his wife, Kathy, and children, daughter, Jennifer, and son, Chris.

== Filmography ==
- The Good Guys and the Bad Guys (1969, co-written and co-produced with Ronald M. Cohen)
- The Car (1977, co-wrote the screenplay with Michael Butler and Lane Slate and story with Butler)
- The Gauntlet (1977, co-written with Michael Butler)
- Murder by Phone (1982, co-screenplay with Michael Butler and John Kent Harrison, co-story with George Armondo, James Whiton, Michael Butler)
- Flashpoint (1984, co-written with Michael Butler)
- Code of Silence (1985, co-written with Michael Butler and Mike Gray, co-story with Michael Butler)
- Pale Rider (1985, co-written with Michael Butler)
- Rent-a-Cop (1987, co-written with Michael Blodgett)
- Hero and the Terror (1988, co-written with Michael Blodgett)
- Turner & Hooch (1989, co-written with Michael Blodgett, Daniel Petrie, Jr., Jim Cash, and Jack Epps, Jr., co-story with Blodgett and Petrie)
- Cadence (1990, screenplay)
- Run (1991, co-written with Michael Blodgett)
- Fifty/Fifty (1992, co-written with Michael Butler)
- Malevolent (2002)
