= Max Kasch =

American actor and musician (born 1985)

- Born: Joseph Maxwell Kasch; December 6, 1985 (age 40); Santa Monica, California, U.S.
- Years active: 1999–present
- Spouse: Sophie Sawyer
- Relatives: Cody Kasch (brother)

Joseph Maxwell "Max" Kasch (born December 6, 1985) is an American actor and musician. He played "Zig-Zag" in Holes (2003), T-Dog in Waiting... (2005), and Troy in Shrooms (2007).

== Early life ==
Joseph Maxwell Kasch was born in Santa Monica, California, to Jody and Taylor Kasch. Kasch is of Scottish descent. He has three full siblings (one sister and two brothers), Quinby, Dylan and Cody Kasch. He grew up in Ojai, California.

== Filmography ==
=== Film ===
Year	Title	Role
2000	Falling Like This	Brad
2003	Holes	Ricky "Zig-Zag"
2004	Chrystal	"Shorty"
2005	Waiting...	Theodore "T-Dog"
2005	Red Eye	Headphone Kid
2005	The Greatest Game Ever Played	Freddie Wallis
2006	Right at Your Door	Corporal Marshall
2007	Shrooms	Troy
2008	The Grift	John Bender
2008	Forever Strong	Griggs
2009	Still Waiting...	Theodore "T-Dog"
2014	Whiplash	Dorm Neighbor

=== Television ===
Year	Title	Role	Notes
1999	Two of a Kind	Drummer	Episode: "My Boyfriend's Back"
1999	The X-Files	Evan Shipley	Episode: "Agua Mala"
1999	V.I.P.	Jeremy	Episode: "K-Val"
2001	ER	Andrew	2 episodes

=== Stage ===
Title
Slab Boys
Outsiders
Waiting for Godot
Geography of a Horse Dreamer
American Buffalo
Othello
