= The Escorts (Iowa band) =

== The Escorts (later The Do's & The Don'ts) ==
The Escorts (later The Do's & The Don'ts) was an American rock and roll band formed in Iowa City, Iowa, in 1959 by University of Iowa students Dick Sherman, Dick Burns, and Roger Booth. The group played its first public engagement at the Montgomery Ward grand opening in Washington, Iowa, and was subsequently based in Cedar Rapids before Dick and Zelda Sherman moved to Ely, Iowa, in 1963. Zelda Sherman joined in 1962, recognized as one of Iowa's first female rock and roll keyboard players.

The band was one of the first groups in Iowa to perform rock and roll music. In 1966, they changed their name to The Do's & The Don'ts upon signing with Red Bird Records in New York. They performed in ballrooms throughout Iowa and traveled out of state as well, appearing with nationally known acts including The Everly Brothers, The Four Seasons, Tommy James & The Shondells, Sam the Sham & The Pharaohs, and Gary Lewis & The Playboys. For ten consecutive years they received an award from the National Ballroom Operators Association, and in 1965 and 1966 they were recognized as Iowa's Best Dressed Band.

== Chart success ==
Their single "I Wonder If She Loves Me," written by Roger Booth and released on Red Bird Records in 1966 (single #10-072), reached the local top ten on multiple Midwest radio stations:

- #4, August 1966, KIOA, Des Moines, IA
- #6, August 19, 1966, KCRG, Cedar Rapids, IA
- #6, August 5, 1966, WAKX, Duluth, MN
- #4, August 13, 1966, WEBC, Duluth, MN

The single was featured in the Spotlight Singles section of Billboard magazine on July 2, 1966. The Escorts / The Do's & The Don'ts released twelve records during their career, the most of any Iowa rock and roll band during the 1950s, 1960s, and 1970s.

== Hall of Fame inductions ==
The Iowa Rock 'n' Roll Music Association inducted The Do's & The Don'ts into its Hall of Fame in 1997 — the inaugural year of the Hall of Fame — at the Roof Garden in Arnolds Park, Iowa. They were among the first bands ever honored with that distinction.

== Current members ==
- Dick Sherman — Bass Guitar, Vocals (founder)
- Zelda Sherman — Keyboards, Piano, Organ
- Rick Sherman — Drums, Vocals (son of Dick and Zelda Sherman)
- John Shaw — Electric Guitar, Vocals
- Diane Shaw — Vocals

== Former members ==
- Roger Booth — Drums, Lead Vocals, Songwriter (died 2010)
- Dick Burns — Lead Guitar (died 1984)

== Discography ==
- The Escorts / The Do's & the Don'ts (compilation) (1997)
- Do's & Don'ts 45 Years Live (October 2004 on Youngland Records)
