= Jeff Balis =

American film director

- Born: April 13, 1975 (age 50); United States
- Occupations: Film director, film producer

Jeff Balis (born April 13, 1975) is an American filmmaker whose directorial debut was the 2009 independent film Still Waiting..., starring John Michael Higgins.

Balis was a producer on the original Waiting....
