= Dogue de Bordeaux =

Dog breed originating in France

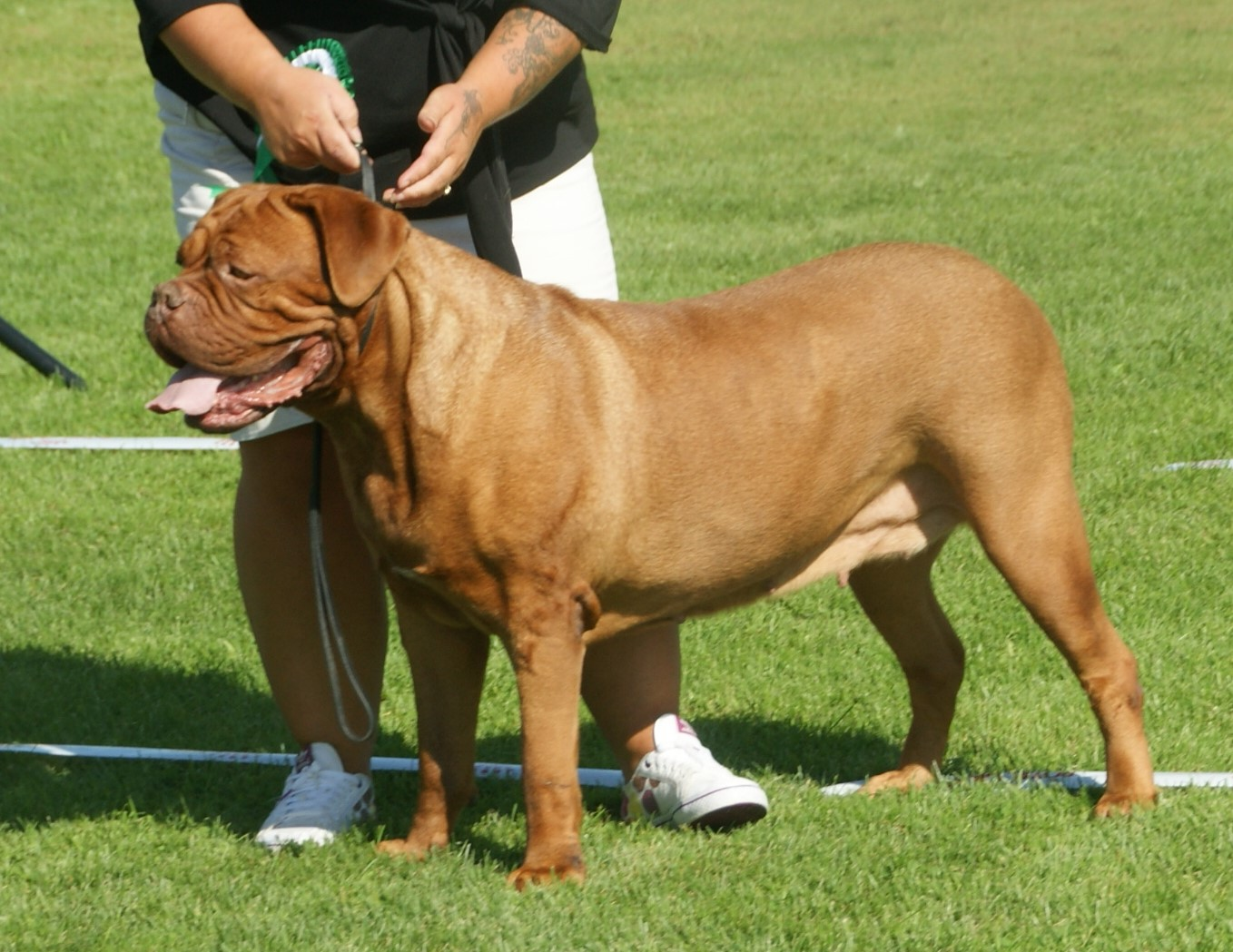
- Other names: Bordeaux Mastiff; French Mastiff; Bordeauxdog
- Origin: France
Traits
Height	Males	24–27 in (61–69 cm)
	Females	23–26 in (58–66 cm)
Weight	Males	110–150 lb (50–68 kg)
	Females	100–120 lb (45–54 kg)
- Coat: Fine, short and soft to the touch
- Colour: All shades of fawn, from a dark red fawn to a light fawn. A rich coat color is considered desirable. Limited white patches are permissible on the chest and the extremities of the limbs
- Litter size: Avg. 8 pups
Kennel club standards
- Société Centrale Canine: standard
- Fédération Cynologique Internationale: standard

The Dogue de Bordeaux, also known as the Bordeaux Mastiff, French Mastiff or Bordeauxdog, is a large French mastiff breed. A typical brachycephalic mastiff breed, the Bordeaux is a very powerful dog, with a very muscular body.

== History ==
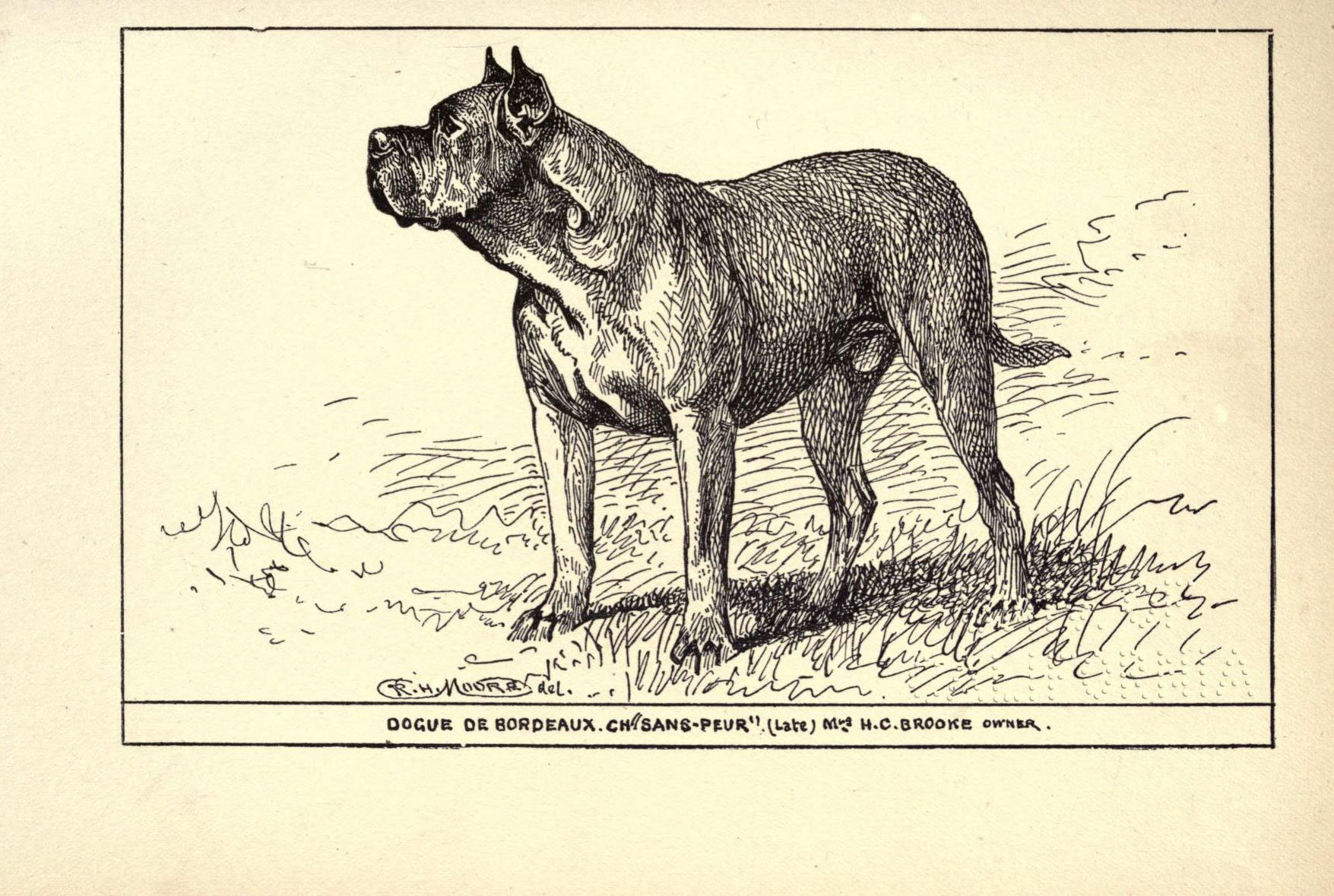
Dogue de Bordeaux CH "Sans-Peur", 1900.

Sculpture of a Dogue de Bordeaux in the act of wolf-baiting from the Muséum national d'histoire naturelle

The Dogue de Bordeaux was known in France as early as the 14th century, particularly in southern France in the region around Bordeaux. Hence, the city lent its name to this large dog, "dogue" being the French form of the English word. The breed was first exhibited in France in 1863 after which time it gained in popularity not only in their home country but in other parts of the world. The first record of the Dogue de Bordeaux in the UK can be seen in the Kennel Club Gazette in 1897. The breed received championship status with the Kennel Club (UK) in 2016. A uniform breed type of the Bordeaux dog did not exist before about 1920.

The history of the breed is believed to predate the Bullmastiff and the Bulldog. It is said that the Dogue can be found in the background of the Bullmastiff, and others claim that the Dogue and mastiff breeds were both being accomplished at the same time. Another theory is the Dogue de Bordeaux originates from the Tibetan Mastiff and it is also said that the Dogue is related to the Greek Molossus used for war.

As there was a breed similar to the Dogue de Bordeaux in Rome at the time of Julius Caesar's reign, possibly a cousin of the Neapolitan Mastiff. Others suggest that the Dogue de Bordeaux is a descendant of a breed which existed in ancient France, the Dogues de Bordeaux of Aquitaine.

=== Breeding ===
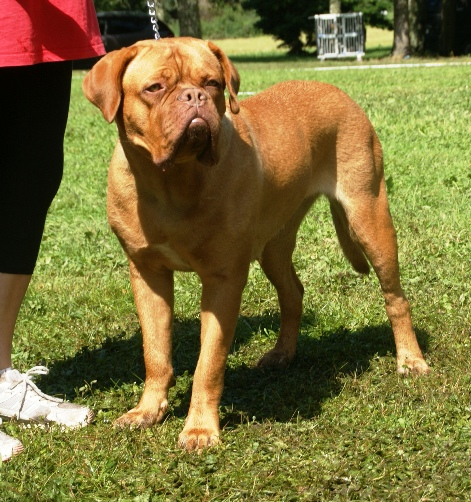
Dogue de Bordeaux

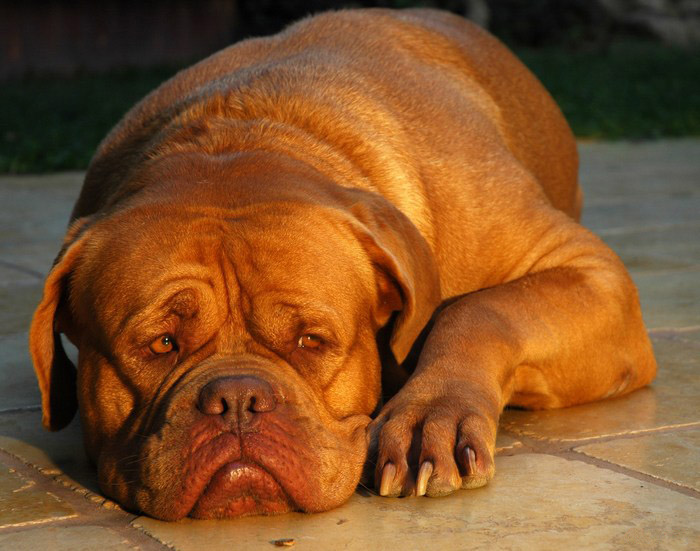
Dogue de Bordeaux

In 1863, the first canine exhibition was held at the "Jardin d'Acclimatation" (at the time known as the "Jardin Zoologique d'Acclimatation" in the Bois de Boulogne public park) in Paris, France. The winner of the Dogue de Bordeaux class was a female named Magenta.

During the 1960s, a group of breeders of the Dogue de Bordeaux in France, headed by Raymond Triquet, worked on the rebuilding of the foundation of the breed. In 1971, a new standard was written for the breed, with the most recent update in 1993. This standard is the basis of the standard written for the American Kennel Club in 2005.

Although the Dogue de Bordeaux first arrived in the USA in the 1890s for the show ring, the first documented Dogue de Bordeaux of modern times appeared in 1959 by the name of Fidelle de Fenelon. Between 1969 and 1980, imported Dogues de Bordeaux in the US were scarce, limited to a few breeders who worked closely with the French Dogue de Bordeaux Club, the SADB. The breed was first "officially" introduced to American purebred enthusiasts in an article written in 1982 by the American anthropologist Dr. Carl Semencic for Dog World magazine. When Semencic's first article on the breed was published, there were no Dogues de Bordeaux in the United States. There were 600 examples left in the world, mostly in France, the Netherlands and East Berlin, and the breed's numbers were on the decline. Later, in 1989, knowledge of the Dogue de Bordeaux grew due to Touchstone's movie Turner & Hooch about a policeman and his canine partner.

Since then, the Dogue de Bordeaux has grown in popularity in the United States and can be found in greatly increasing numbers across the country. The Dogue de Bordeaux has been supported by multiple breed clubs throughout the years, and has finally found its way to full American Kennel Club recognition through the assistance of the Dogue de Bordeaux Society of America. Since 1997, the society has helped bring the breed to the point in which full AKC recognition could be achieved.

== Appearance ==
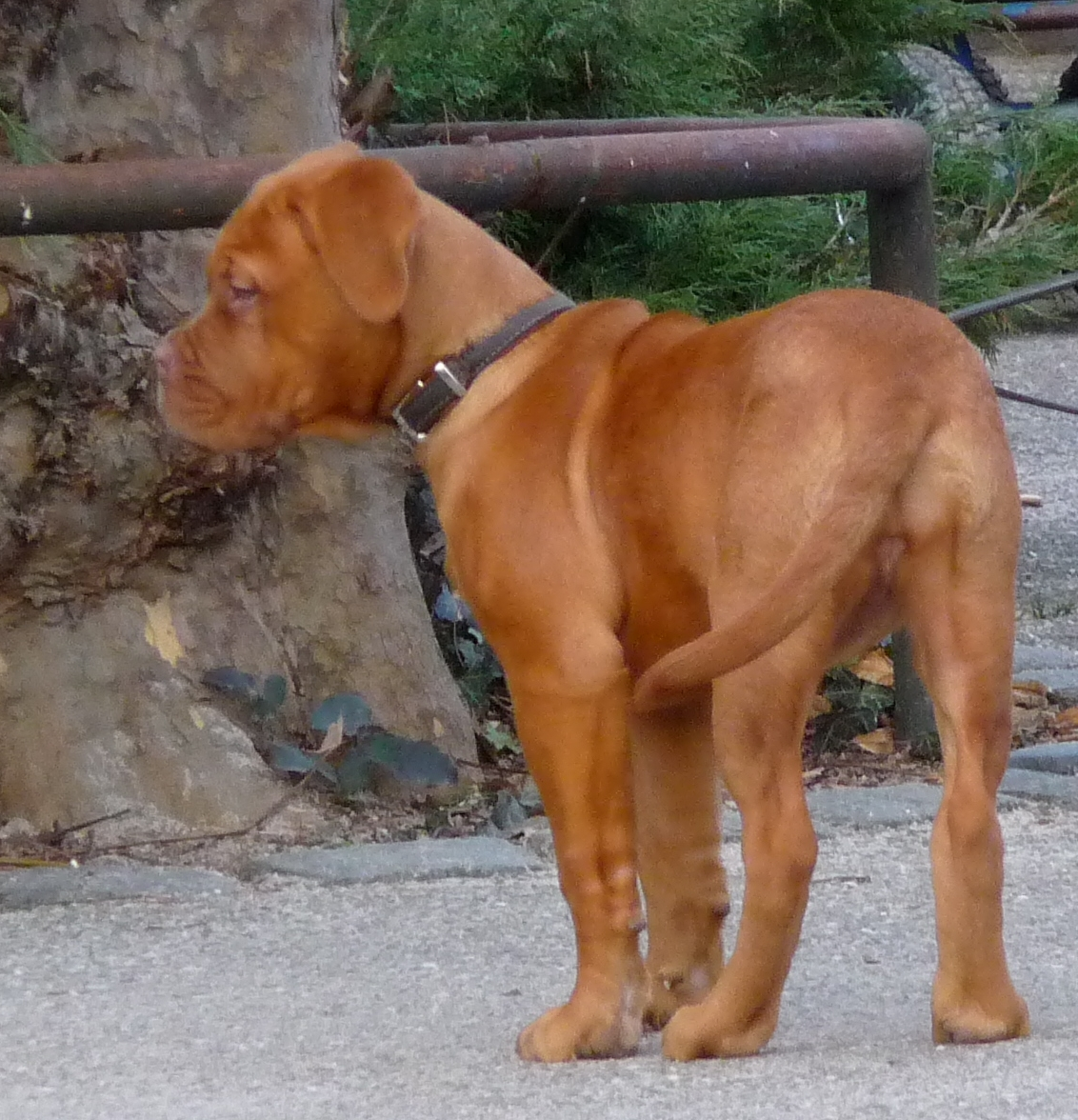
Dogue de Bordeaux puppy

The Dogue de Bordeaux is a well balanced, muscular and massive dog with a powerful build. The distance from the deepest point of the chest to the ground is slightly less than the depth of the chest. A massive head with proper proportions and features is an important characteristic of the breed. The breed is set somewhat low to the ground and is not tall like the English Mastiff. The body of the Dogue de Bordeaux is thick-set, with a top-line that has a slight dip (topline is never completely straight) and a gentle rounded croup. The front legs should be straight and heavy-boned, well up on pasterns, down to tight cat-like feet. The straight tail, beginning thickly at the base and then tapering to a point at the end, should not reach lower than the hocks, and is set and carried low. The breed is to be presented in a completely natural condition with intact ears, tail, and natural dewclaws. It should be evaluated equally for correctness in conformation, temperament, movement, and overall structural soundness.

=== Weight ===
The breed standards by European FCI and the AKC specify a minimum weight of 99 pounds (45 kg) for a female and 110 pounds (50 kg) for a male. There is no formally stated maximum weight, but dogs must be balanced with regard to their overall type and the conformation standards of the breed.

=== Height ===
The standard states that the desirable height, at maturity, should range between 24 and 27 inches (61 and 69 cm) for male dogs and from 23 to 26 inches (58 to 66 cm) for females. Deviation from these margins is considered a fault.

=== Head ===
The massive head is a crucial breed characteristic. The Dogue de Bordeaux is claimed to have the largest head in the canine world, in proportion to the rest of the body. For males, the circumference of the head, measured at the widest point of the skull, is roughly equal to the dog's height at the withers (shoulders). For females, the circumference may be slightly less. When viewed from the front or from above, the head of the Dogue forms a trapezoid shape with the longer top-line of the skull, and the shorter line of the underjaw, forming the parallel sides of the trapezoid. The jaw is undershot and powerful. The Dogue should always have a black or red mask that can be distinguished from the rest of the coat around and under the nose, including the lips and eye rims. The nose color in red-masked dogs should be brown, in black-masked dogs, it must be black. The muzzle should be at most a third of the total length of the head and no shorter than a quarter of the length of the head, the ideal being between the two extremes. The upper lip hangs thickly down over the lower jaw. The upper lips of the Dogue de Bordeaux hangs over the lower lips. The skin on the neck is loose, forming a noticeable dewlap, but should not resemble that of a Neapolitan Mastiff. Small pendant ears top the head, but should not be long and hound like.

=== Coat ===
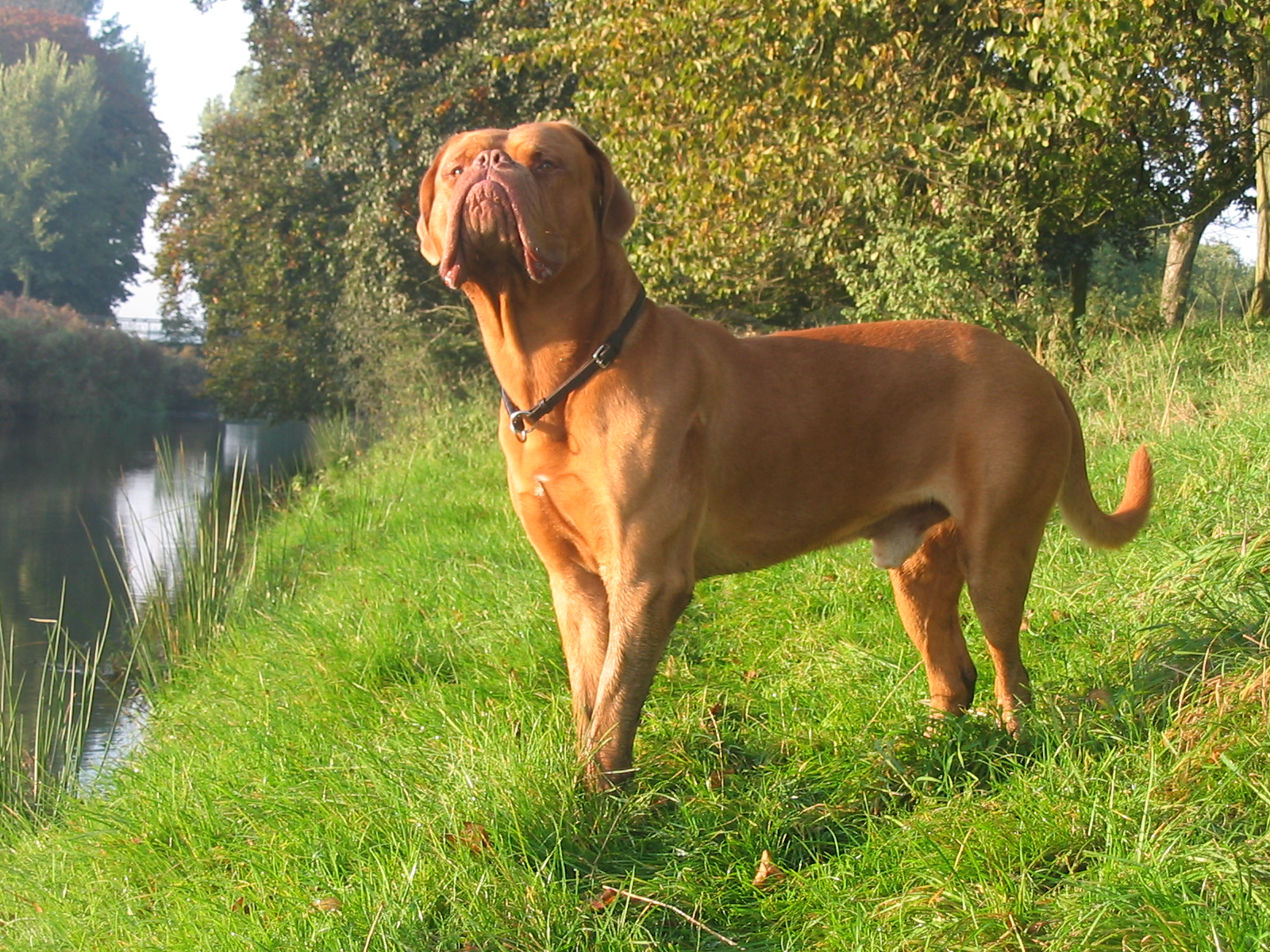
Dogue de Bordeaux standing proudly

The standard specifies the coat to be 'short, fine, and soft to the touch'. Color varies from shades of fawn (light, coppery red) to mahogany (dark, brownish red) with a black, brown, or red mask, although the red mask is true to the breed. White markings are permitted on the tips of the toes and on the chest, but white on any other part of the body is considered a fault, and a disqualifying one if the pigmentation goes beyond the neck.

== Temperament ==
Much like other mastiff breeds, Dogues de Bordeaux tend to have a strong personality and are very stubborn. This mixed with their natural strength makes strict training crucial starting at a young age. This includes proper socialization so they do not end up with potential aggression towards other dogs or strangers.

== Health ==
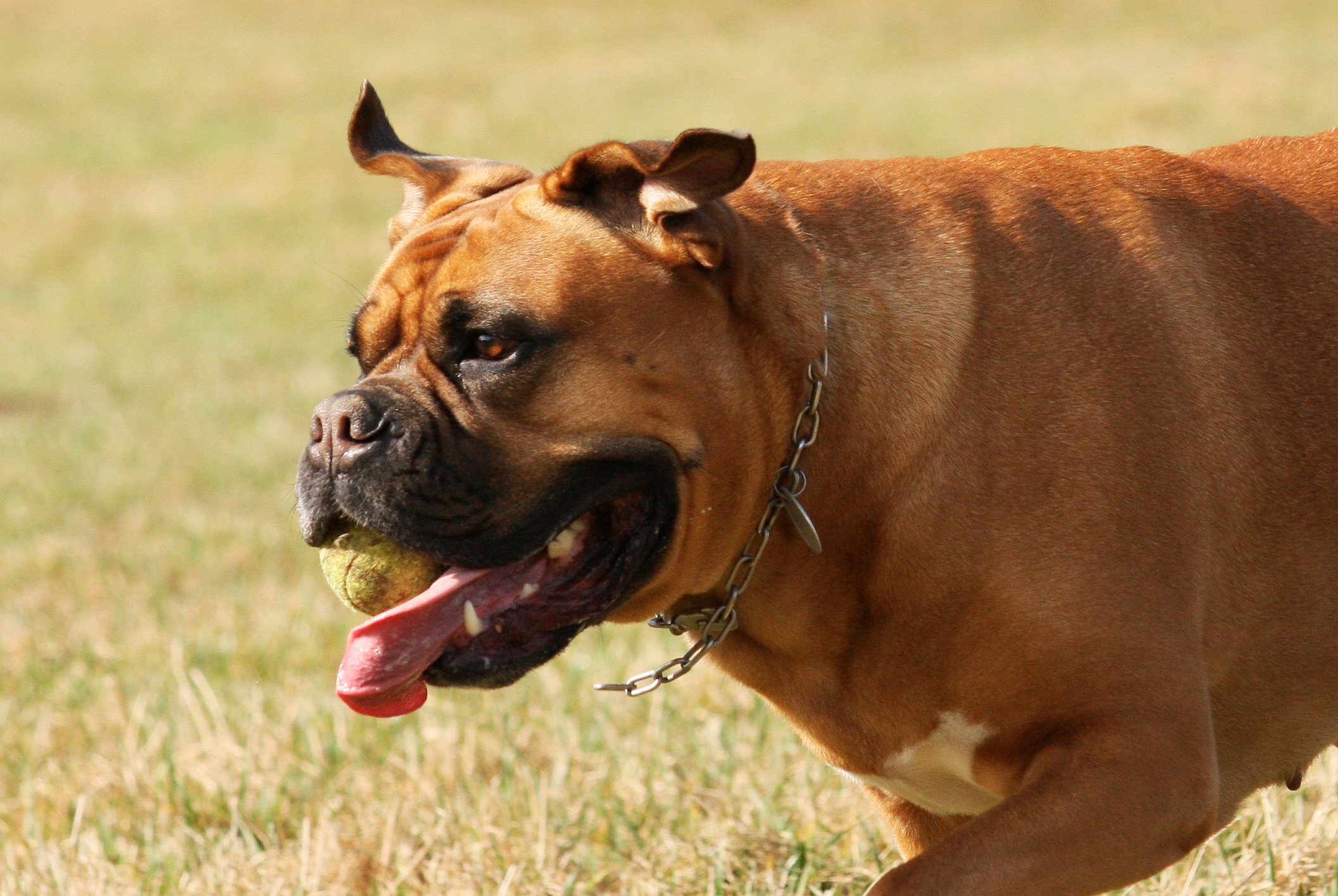
Female with black mask

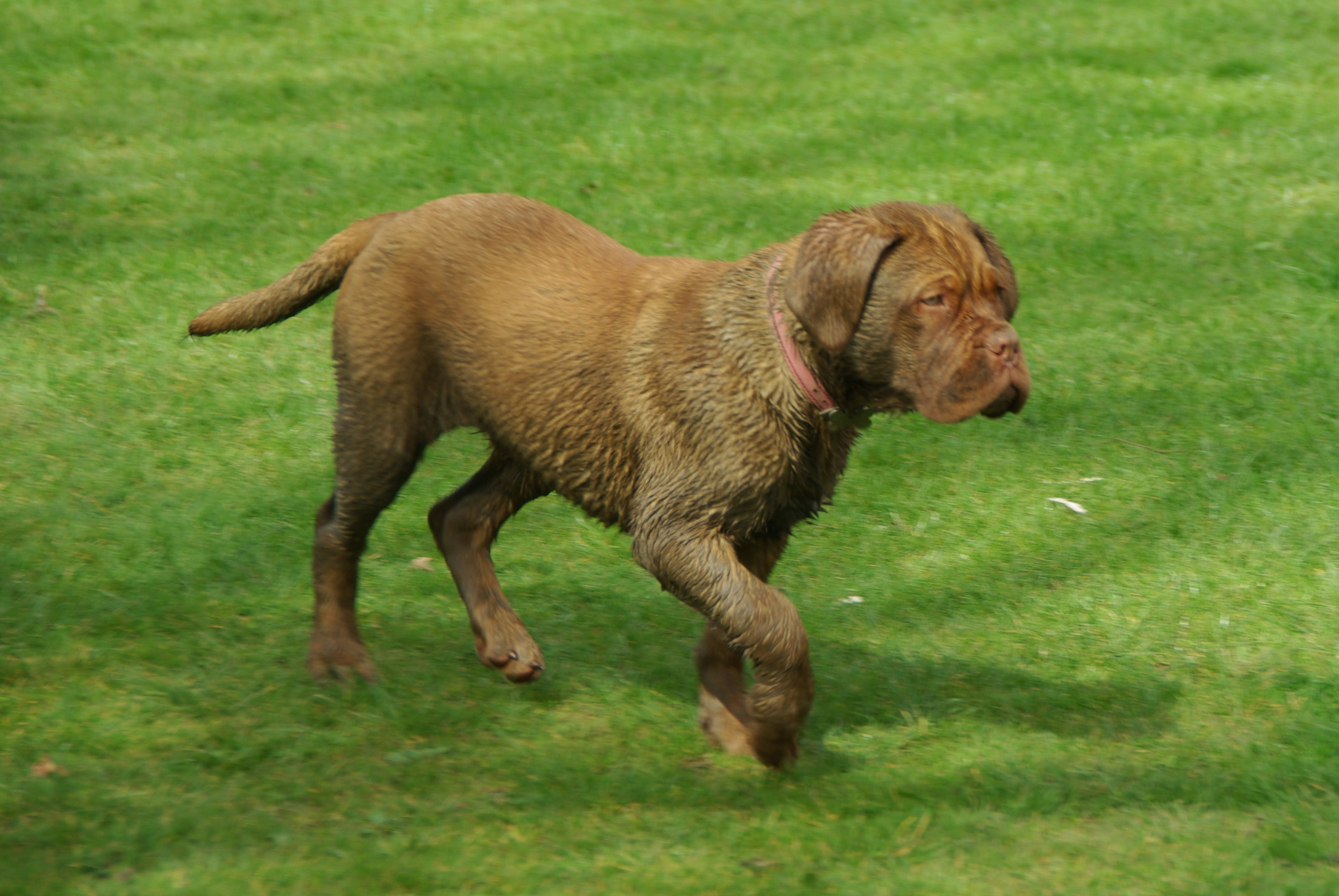
A young Dogue de Bordeaux

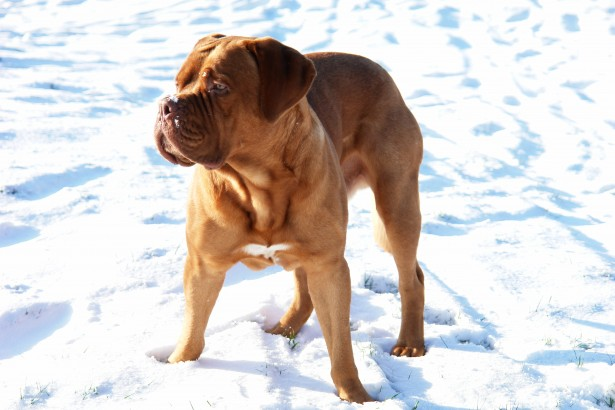
Dogue de Bordeaux in the snow

=== Life expectancy ===
A 2024 UK study found a life expectancy of 11.1 years for the breed compared to an average of 12.7 for purebreeds and 12 for crossbreeds.

=== Brachycephaly ===
The shortened snout and pushed in face of the Dogue de Bordeaux is known as brachycephaly. Brachycephaly results in deformation of the upper airway tract and leads to obstruction of breathing. Effects of brachycephaly are stridor, stertorous breathing, emesis, skin fold dermatitis, brachycephalic airway obstructive syndrome, exophthalmos, pharyngeal gag reflex, cyanosis, and laryngeal collapse. Other issues arising from brachycephaly are risk of complications whilst under anaesthesia, and hyperthermia — with the latter caused due to an inability to effectively reduce body temperature via panting.

=== Cardiovascular disease ===
Aortic stenosis is a disease of the heart valve in which the opening of the aortic valve is narrowed. One study suggests a high predisposition in the breed. No severe cases were found in adult dogs, and most moderate to severely affected dogs died before one year of age, leading the authors to speculate that the disease is more severe in the Dogue than in other breeds.

An Israeli study found the Dogue de Bordeaux to have the highest prevalence of tricuspid valve dysplasia, and the second highest prevalence of subaortic stenosis.

An Italian study found a predisposition to supraventricular tachyarrhythmia.

=== Other conditions ===
Demodicosis is more prevalent in the breed than other dogs. A study in the UK found 0.9% of dogs had the condition compared to the general rate of 0.17%. For dogs under 2 years it was prevalent in 1.9% compared to 0.48%. In dogs over the age of 4 it was prevalent in 0.2% of dogs compared to 0.05%.

An estimated 5% of dogs may be affected by footpad hyperkeratosis, a thickening of the footpad and sometimes nose. Lesions usually occur at the age of 6 months. The Dogue de Bordeaux is predisposed to hip dysplasia, with the prevalence ranging from 25.5% in the US, to 32.2% in France, and 47% in Finland.

=== Reproduction ===
Data from the Norwegian Kennel Club indicates a mean litter size of 8.1 puppies (ranging from 2-17) for the breed. The breed has a high stillborn and early neonatal mortality rate, with a stillborn rate of 14.2% and early neonatal mortality (death within 1 week from birth) of 10.4%. The average across all breeds in the study was 4.3% stillbirth and 3.7% early neonatal mortality. Excluding stillborn and early deaths, the mean litter size is 6.1. UK Kennel Club data shows that 27.8% (5 of 18) of Dogue litters were delivered by caesarean section.

== See also ==
- Turner & Hooch
- List of dog breeds
