= Rob McKittrick =

American film director

- Born: August 31, 1973 (age 53); Bradenton, Florida, U.S.
- Occupations: Film director, screenwriter

Rob McKittrick (born August 31, 1973) is an American filmmaker who directed the 2005 independent film Waiting... starring Ryan Reynolds. He also wrote the sequel to the film, Still Waiting... (2009).

== Early life and education ==
McKittrick grew up in Bradenton, Florida and graduated from Bayshore High School in 1991. Following high school, he attended the State College of Florida, Manatee–Sarasota.

== Career ==
While working jobs in multiple restaurants in the 1990s, McKittrick conceived the original concept for Waiting... with the help from Jim Moses and Ben Bakker based on his experiences working at Bennigans in Bradenton, Florida.

In 2009, he worked on Universal Pictures and Jay Baruchel's project based on Baruchel's Johnny Klutz character. He co-wrote the 2018 comedy Tag for New Line Cinema.

== Personal life ==
McKittrick lives in the Hollywood Hills neighborhood of Los Angeles.
