= Anthony Ruivivar =

American actor

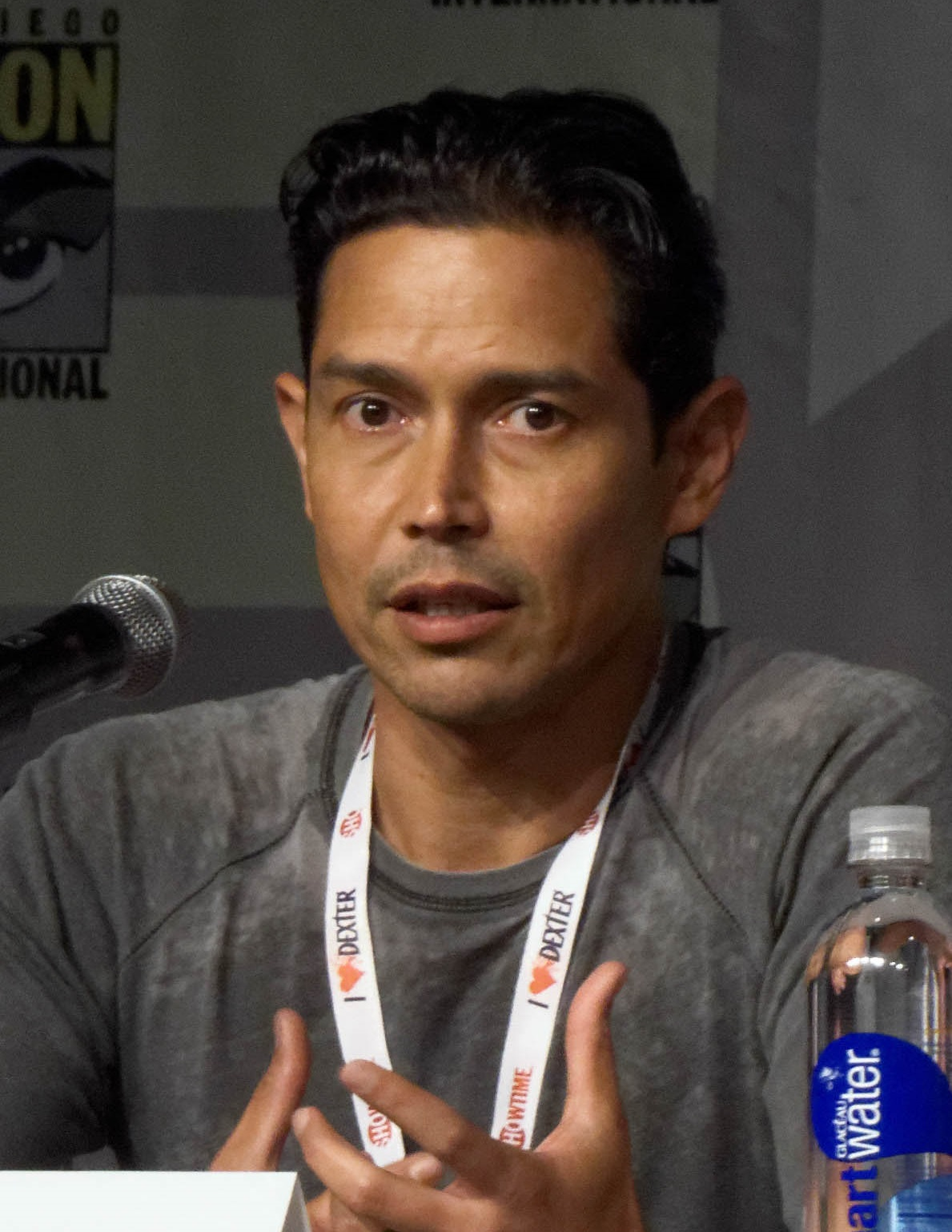
- Ruivivar at the 2013 San Diego Comic-Con
- Born: November 4, 1970 (age 55); Honolulu, Hawaii, U.S.
- Citizenship: United States; Philippines
- Occupation: Actor
- Years active: 1990–present
- Spouse: Yvonne Jung (m. 1998)
- Children: 3, including Levi Ruivivar

Anthony Ruivivar (born November 4, 1970) is an American actor. He is known for playing Carlos Nieto on Third Watch and Alex Longshadow on Banshee. He also voiced Batman on Beware the Batman.

== Career ==
Ruivivar's early appearances include the films Race the Sun (1996) and a minor character in Starship Troopers (1997). His breakthrough role came in 1999 as Carlos Nieto, a paramedic in the action/drama series Third Watch (1999–2005), which centers on the life of police officers, paramedics, and firemen of a fictional precinct and fire station in New York City. In the show, Carlos was a Hawaiian-born Filipino-American who was abandoned by his family and spent his youth in various foster homes.

After Third Watch, Ruivivar remained in the drama genre, usually playing a police officer, detective or FBI agent in shows such as Traveler, Quantico, Numb3rs, Criminal Minds, CSI: Crime Scene Investigation (all 2007), and Lie to Me (2009).

In 2010, he had a main role in ABC's The Whole Truth as Alejo Salazar. He also had recurring roles as Alex Longshadow in Banshee and Bruce Wayne / Batman in Beware the Batman.

== Personal life ==
Ruivivar is of half Filipino descent and his other half is German and Irish.

In January 1998, he married actress Yvonne Jung, who would later appear in seasons 5 and 6 (2003–05) of Third Watch as FDNY EMS Paramedic Holly Levine. In the show, Ruivivar and Jung's characters became a couple and got married in the series finale. They have three children; two sons, Kainoa and Kale, and a daughter, Levi, who is a member of the Philippines Women's Gymnastics national team.

Ruivivar is fluent in Spanish and has incorporated this in Third Watch. He has a Bachelor of Fine Arts degree from Boston University.

== Filmography ==
=== Film ===
Year	Film	Role	Notes
1994	White Fang 2	Peter	
1996	Race the Sun	Eduardo Braz	
1997	Starship Troopers	Shujumi	
1998	High Art	Xander	
1999	Simply Irresistible	Ramos	
2004	Poster Boy	Daniel	
2008	Tropic Thunder	Platoon Sergeant	
2009	A Perfect Getaway	Chronic	
2011	The Adjustment Bureau	McCrady	
2012	Junction	Tai	
2015	Larry Gaye: Renegade Male Flight Attendant	Flight School Administrator	
2017	Lost Cat Corona	Guillermo	
2021	Mad God	Witch (voice)	
2022	Immanence	Roman	

=== Television ===
Year	Title	Role	Notes
1997	Law & Order	Raymond Cartena	Episode: "Mad Dog"
1997	All My Children	Enrique "Ricky"	2 episodes
1999–05	Third Watch	Carlos Nieto	131 episodes
2005	Medical Investigation	Carlos Nieto	Episode: "Half Life"
2006	Close to Home	Detective Vega	Episode: "Escape"
2007	Numbers	Agent Cordero	Episode: "Finders Keepers"
2007	Criminal Minds	Lt. Ricardo Vega	Episode: "Ashes and Dust"
2007	Traveler	Agent Guillermo Borjes	8 episodes
2007	CSI: Crime Scene Investigation	Det. Ruben Bejarano	Episode: "Who and What"
2007	Chuck	Tommy Delgado	2 episodes
2009	Lie to Me	FBI Agent Dardis	Episode: "A Perfect Score"
2010–11	The Whole Truth	Alejo Salazar	13 episodes
2011	The Good Wife	Captain Moyer	Episode: "Whiskey Tango Foxtrot"
2011	American Horror Story: Murder House	Miguel Ramos	Episode: "Afterbirth"
2012	Burn Notice	Rafael Montero	Episode: "Mixed Messages"
2012	Major Crimes	D.D.A. Ozzy Michaels	3 episodes
2012	The Mentalist	Victor Phipps	Episode: "Black Cherry"
2013	Southland	Officer Hank Lucero	7 episodes
2013	Castle	Barrett Hawke	Episode: "A Murder Is Forever"
2013–14	Revolution	General Bill Carver	4 episodes
2013–14	Beware the Batman	Bruce Wayne / Batman, Thomas Wayne (voices)	26 episodes
2013–15	Banshee	Alex Longshadow	17 episodes
2014	Beauty & the Beast	Agent Henry Knox	4 episodes
2014	Hawaii Five-0	Marco Reyes	4 episodes
2014	Nashville	Brett Rivers	Episode: "I'm Coming Home to You"
2014–15	Avengers Assemble	Nighthawk (voice)	7 episodes
2015	Quantico	Agent Jimenez	Episode: "Run"
2015–16	American Horror Story: Hotel	Richard Ramirez	2 episodes
2015	NCIS: Los Angeles	Mark Ruiz	Episode: "Unspoken"
2015–16	Gortimer Gibbon's Life on Normal Street	Adam Hernandez	5 episodes
2016	Scream	Sheriff Miguel Acosta	12 episodes
2016–17	Frequency	Captain Stan Moreno	9 episodes
2017	Blue Bloods	Det. Tommy Jordan	Episode: "The Thin Blue Line"
2018	The Haunting of Hill House	Kevin Harris	8 episodes
2021	Turner & Hooch	James Mendez	12 episodes
2022–23	NCIS: Hawaiʻi	Daniel Tennant	7 episodes
2023	Ridley Jones	Anubis (voice)	Episode: "Game of Jones"
2025	The Bay	Raymond Hale	2 episodes
