= Don Brochu =

American film editor

Donald Brochu is an American film editor.

== Career ==
After assisting in the editing of a Cheech and Chong film in 1981 and 1982, Don Brochu was given an opportunity by Hal Ashby to be in charge of the editing himself. He continued to edit cinematic features throughout the eighties and nineties and was nominated for an Academy Award for Best Film Editing in 1994. Since the turn of the century he has mainly been editing television films. He has worked with the director Ron Underwood several times and is a frequent collaborator of Kenny Ortega. Don Brochu is a member of the American Cinema Editors.

== Selected filmography ==
Editor
| Year | Film | Director | Notes |
|---|---|---|---|
| 1985 | The Slugger's Wife | Hal Ashby | |
| 1987 | La Bamba | Luis Valdez | |
| 1987 | Born in East L.A. | Cheech Marin | |
| 1988 | Mystic Pizza | Donald Petrie | First collaboration with Donald Petrie |
| 1989 | Lock Up | John Flynn | First collaboration with John Flynn |
| 1991 | Out for Justice | John Flynn | Second collaboration with John Flynn |
| 1992 | A Midnight Clear | Keith Gordon | |
| 1992 | Under Siege | Andrew Davis | First collaboration with Andrew Davis |
| 1993 | Beyond the Law | Larry Ferguson | |
| 1993 | The Fugitive | Andrew Davis | Second collaboration with Andrew Davis |
| 1994 | On Deadly Ground | Steven Seagal | |
| 1995 | The Walking Dead | Preston A. Whitmore II | |
| 1995 | Steal Big Steal Little | Andrew Davis | Third collaboration with Andrew Davis |
| 1996 | Chain Reaction | Andrew Davis | Fourth collaboration with Andrew Davis |
| 1997 | Volcano | Mick Jackson | First collaboration with Mick Jackson |
| 1999 | Blast from the Past | Hugh Wilson | First collaboration with Hugh Wilson |
| 1999 | Dudley Do-Right | Hugh Wilson | Second collaboration with Hugh Wilson |
| 2002 | The First $20 Million Is Always the Hardest | Mick Jackson | Third collaboration with Mick Jackson |
| 2003 | The Medallion | Gordon Chan | |
| 2005 | In the Mix | Ron Underwood | First collaboration with Ron Underwood |
| 2008 | High School Musical 3: Senior Year | Kenny Ortega | First collaboration with Kenny Ortega |
| 2008 | Christmas Cottage | Michael Campus | |
| 2015 | Yellow Day | Carl Lauten | |
| 2017 | A Change of Heart | Kenny Ortega | Fifth collaboration with Kenny Ortega |

Editorial department
| Year | Film | Director | Role | Notes |
|---|---|---|---|---|
| 1981 | Nice Dreams | Tommy Chong | Assistant editor | |
| 1982 | Things Are Tough All Over | Thomas K. Avildsen | Assistant film editor | |
| 1982 | Tootsie | Sydney Pollack | Assistant editor | First collaboration with Sydney Pollack |
| 1983 | Spacehunter: Adventures in the Forbidden Zone | Lamont Johnson | Assistant editor | |
| 1984 | Against All Odds | Taylor Hackford | Assistant editor | |
| 1985 | Out of Africa | Sydney Pollack | Assistant editor | Second collaboration with Sydney Pollack |
| 1988 | Alien Nation | Graham Baker | Additional editor | |

Thanks
| Year | Film | Director | Role |
|---|---|---|---|
| 1997 | Spawn | Mark A.Z. Dippé | Thanks |

Documentaries

Editor
| Year | Film | Director | Notes |
|---|---|---|---|
| 2009 | Michael Jackson's This Is It | Kenny Ortega | Second collaboration with Kenny Ortega |

TV movies

Editor
| Year | Film | Director | Notes |
|---|---|---|---|
| 1989 | Double Exposure: The Story of Margaret Bourke-White | Lawrence Schiller | |
| 1990 | Turner & Hooch | Donald Petrie | Second collaboration with Donald Petrie |
| 2000 | Ready to Run | Duwayne Dunham | First collaboration with Duwayne Dunham |
| 2001 | A Glimpse of Hell | Mikael Salomon | |
| 2004 | 10.5 | John Lafia | |
| 2004 | Tiger Cruise | Duwayne Dunham | Second collaboration with Duwayne Dunham |
| 2006 | Holiday in Handcuffs | Ron Underwood | Second collaboration with Ron Underwood |
| 2006 | Santa Baby | Ron Underwood | Third collaboration with Ron Underwood |
| 2007 | The Dukes of Hazzard: The Beginning | Robert Berlinger | |
| 2008 | The American Mall | Shawn Ku | |
| 2009 | My Fake Fiancé | Gil Junger | First collaboration with Gil Junger |
| 2009 | Santa Baby 2: Christmas Maybe | Ron Underwood | Fourth collaboration with Ron Underwood |
| 2010 | Beauty & the Briefcase | Gil Junger | Second collaboration with Gil Junger |
| 2010 | Christmas Cupid | Gil Junger | Third collaboration with Gil Junger |
| 2011 | Teen Spirit | Gil Junger | Fourth collaboration with Gil Junger |
| 2011 | The Bling Ring | Michael Lembeck | |
| 2011 | Deck the Halls | Ron Underwood | Fifth collaboration with Ron Underwood |
| 2012 | The Mistle-Tones | Paul Hoen | First collaboration with Paul Hoen |
| 2013 | Call Me Crazy: A Five Film | Bryce Dallas Howard; Laura Dern; Sharon Maguire; Bonnie Hunt; Ashley Judd | |
| 2014 | How to Build a Better Boy | Paul Hoen | Third collaboration with Paul Hoen |
| 2015 | Descendants | Kenny Ortega | Third collaboration with Kenny Ortega |
| 2016 | The Rocky Horror Picture Show: Let's Do the Time Warp Again | Kenny Ortega | Fourth collaboration with Kenny Ortega |
| 2017 | Descendants 2 | Kenny Ortega | Sixth collaboration with Kenny Ortega |
| 2019 | Descendants 3 | Kenny Ortega | Seventh collaboration with Kenny Ortega |

Editorial department
| Year | Film | Director | Role | Notes |
|---|---|---|---|---|
| 1999 | Tuesdays with Morrie | Mick Jackson | Additional editor | Second collaboration with Mick Jackson |
| 2014 | Cloud 9 | Paul Hoen | Additional editor | Second collaboration with Paul Hoen |

TV series

Editor
| Year | Title | Notes |
|---|---|---|
| 2006 | 10.5: Apocalypse | 2 episodes |
| 2020 | Julie and the Phantoms | 5 episodes |

== Awards ==
- 66th Academy Awards: Academy Award for Best Film Editing - The Fugitive (nominated)
- 1994: British Academy Film Award Best Editing - The Fugitive (nominated)
- American Cinema Editors
  - Eddie Award 1994 - The Fugitive (nominated)
  - Eddie Award 2010 - Michael Jackson's This Is It (nominated)
