= Waiting... (film) =

- Theatrical release poster
- Directed by: Rob McKittrick
- Written by: Rob McKittrick
- Produced by: Robert O. Green; Jeff Balis; Jay Rifkin; Adam Rosenfelt; Stavros Merjos; Malcolm Petal
- Starring: Ryan Reynolds; Anna Faris; Justin Long; David Koechner; John Francis Daley; Kaitlin Doubleday; Alanna Ubach; Chi McBride; Luis Guzmán
- Cinematography: Matthew Irving
- Edited by: Andy Blumenthal; David Finfer
- Music by: Adam Gorgoni
- Production companies: Element Films; Eden Rock Media; Wisenheimer Films; LIFT Productions
- Distributed by: Lions Gate Films
- Release dates: September 29, 2005 (Red Carpet Event); October 7, 2005 (United States)
- Running time: 94 minutes
- Country: United States
- Language: English
- Budget: $3 million
- Box office: $18.6 million

Waiting... is a 2005 American comedy film starring Ryan Reynolds, Anna Faris, and Justin Long as staffers at the restaurant Shenaniganz. It is directed by Rob McKittrick in his directorial debut. McKittrick wrote the screenplay while working as a waiter.

The script was initially sold in a film deal to Artisan Entertainment, but was released by Lions Gate Entertainment (which purchased Artisan in 2003). Producers Chris Moore and Jeff Balis of Live Planet's Project Greenlight fame also took notice of the project and assisted. The film made over US$6 million, more than twice the budget of the film, in its opening weekend.

== Plot ==
The film takes place during a single day at Shenaniganz, a franchise restaurant. Dean, who has been working there for four years, learns from his mother that his former schoolmate recently graduated from college and has secured a high-paying job in electrical engineering.

Dean's co-worker, Monty, takes the new employee, Mitch, through his training and introduces him to the staff. Monty also shows Mitch the "Penis Showing Game", where the male staff deliberately expose their genitalia to their unsuspecting coworkers, as well as the ways the staff deals with rude customers. In one scene, food is sent back, which the kitchen staff then gladly contaminate with saliva, dandruff, pubic hair, and other unsavory bits.

The remaining waitstaff are Serena, Monty's ex-girlfriend; Natasha, the underage hostess who shares a mutual attraction with Monty; Dean's girlfriend, Amy; Calvin, a hopeless romantic who cannot urinate in public; and Naomi, a constantly angry waitress. Their manager, Dan, offers Dean the chance to compete with Calvin for the position of assistant manager. An altercation with a customer who left a poor tip for Dean results in Dan demanding an answer by the end of the day.

As the day winds down, Dean is left on his own during the final hour of business. Two new customers arrive, one of whom Dean quickly realizes is Chet, his successful schoolmate. Initially annoyed, Dean is humbled by Chet when he leaves Dean $100 for his $30 meal. Chet reiterates, "You look like you need it more than me," which Dean had retorted to the earlier customer. Dean is called to Dan's office to decide on the promotion, but Dean turns it down and quits his job to return to college for a more promising future.

As the shift ends, the staff heads to a party at Monty and Dean's house, where Monty refrains from having sex with Natasha as she is not of legal age yet, but promises they will the following week after her birthday. Mitch, who had been unable to speak all day, mainly due to Monty's interruptions, finally rants about the entire staff and quits. Before leaving, Mitch exposes his genitals in the form of "The Goat", which the head chef Raddimus had said earlier would grant him instant god-status. Monty declares his allegiance to Mitch, replacing Dean in his absence.

In a post-credits scene, Dan arrives at the home of the customer whom Dean had insulted earlier, incorrectly believing it to be the party's location. The customer angrily demands the gift certificates he was promised earlier from Dan.

== Cast ==
- Ryan Reynolds as Monty
- Anna Faris as Serena
- Justin Long as Dean
- David Koechner as Dan
- Luis Guzmán as Raddimus
- Chi McBride as Bishop
- John Francis Daley as Mitch
- Kaitlin Doubleday as Amy
- Robert Patrick Benedict as Calvin
- Alanna Ubach as Naomi
- Vanessa Lengies as Natasha
- Max Kasch as T-Dog
- Andy Milonakis as Nick
- Dane Cook as Floyd
- Jordan Ladd as Danielle
- Emmanuelle Chriqui as Tyla
- Wendie Malick as Monty's Mom
- Skyler Stone as a cook
- JD Evermore as a redneck
- Travis Resor as Chett

== Production ==
Waiting... was filmed in New Orleans; Jefferson Parish, Louisiana; and Kenner, Louisiana.

== Release ==
The film premiered on September 29, 2005, grossing $6,021,106 in its opening weekend in 1,652 theaters. It opened at #7 at the U.S. box office. Its total gross was $18,637,690, with $16,124,543 in the U.S. and $2,513,147 in foreign markets.

== Reception ==
On the review aggregator website Rotten Tomatoes, 29% of 92 critics' reviews are positive, with an average rating of 4.4/10. The website's consensus reads: "Waiting... is a gross-out comedy that's more gross than comic." Metacritic, which uses a weighted average, assigned the film a score of 30 out of 100, based on 26 critics, indicating "generally unfavorable" reviews. Audiences polled by CinemaScore gave the film an average grade of "B" on an A+ to F scale.

Roger Ebert gave the film a 1.5 stars out of 4 claiming that "'Waiting...' is melancholy for a comedy."

Despite negative reviews from critics, Waiting... has garnered a small cult following.

== Sequel ==
A direct-to-DVD sequel, titled Still Waiting..., was released on February 17, 2009. The second film is about another Shenaniganz location dealing with new competition from a Hooters-like sports bar called TaTa's Wing Shack run by Calvin from the first film.
