= Vanessa Lengies =

Canadian actress (born 1985)

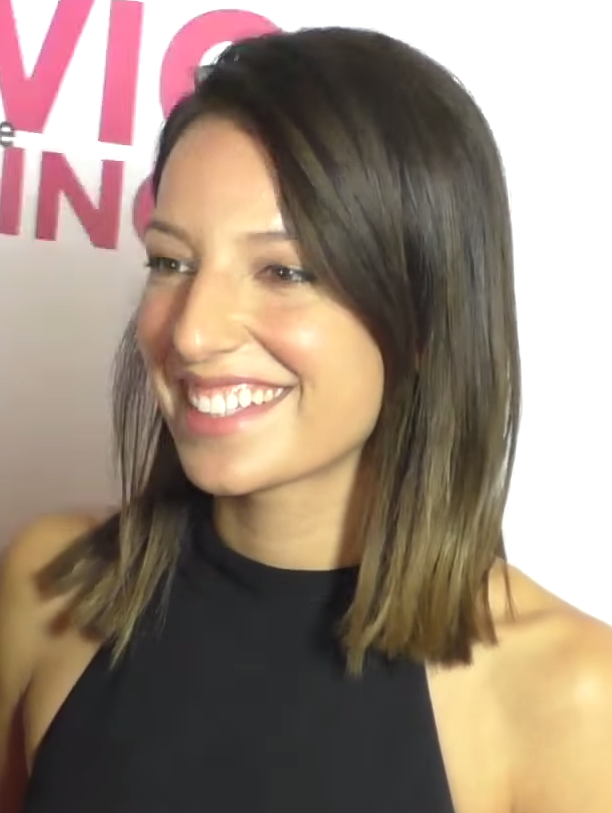
- Lengies in 2016
- Born: July 21, 1985 (age 41); Montreal, Quebec, Canada
- Occupations: Actress; dancer; singer
- Years active: 1992–present
- Known for: American Dreams; Glee; Turner & Hooch
- Spouse: Jens Cromer (m. 2025)
- Children: 1

Vanessa Lengies (born July 21, 1985) is a Canadian actress, dancer, and singer. She is known for starring in the drama American Dreams as Roxanne Bojarski. She appeared as Charge Nurse Kelly Epson on the TNT medical drama HawthoRNe, and has appeared in the recurring role of Sugar Motta in the third, fourth, and sixth seasons of the Fox series Glee. In 2021, Lengies played Erica on Turner & Hooch.

== Early life ==
Lengies was born in Montreal, Quebec, Canada, to a German father and an Egyptian mother. She grew up in Hudson, Quebec, where she graduated from Hudson High School in 2002.

== Career ==
Lengies got her start in Canadian television on shows such as Sponk!, Are You Afraid of the Dark?, Radio Active, and Popular Mechanics for Kids. Her voice was lent to Emily on the PBS animated series Arthur. In 2000, she had the lead role in the Showtime film Ratz.

In 2002, she was cast as a series regular in the NBC comedy-drama American Dreams, playing teenager Roxanne Bojarski. The show was set in Philadelphia in the mid-1960s, and Roxanne becomes one of the dancers on the American Bandstand television show hosted by Dick Clark. The series ran for three seasons, with the final episode broadcast in March 2005.

In August 2005, she co-starred with Hilary Duff and Heather Locklear in the comedy The Perfect Man. She also plays a supporting role as the jailbait hostess, Natasha, in the 2005 American film Waiting..., and reprised the role in the film's 2009 sequel, Still Waiting.... In 2006, she co-starred with Jeff Bridges and Missy Peregrym as a gymnast in the film Stick It.

For The Grudge 2, the role of Vanessa was originally written for Lengies, who eventually turned it down to film My Suicide; the part still bears her name. She has also appeared in CBS show Ghost Whisperer in an episode titled "The Vanishing" and the NBC show Medium in the episode "Apocalypse... Now?". She made another appearance in an episode of the short-lived CBS show Moonlight.

Lengies was seen as Sophia in the Lifetime original drama series Monarch Cove. She also co-starred in the ABC online comedy Squeegees.

She appeared as Nurse Kelly Epson on the TNT medical drama Hawthorne from 2009 through 2011. The role was a recurring one for the first season, and Lengies became a series regular for the following two seasons. The show, which ran for three seasons of ten episodes starting each June, was not renewed for a fourth summer. She appeared in the role of Loco Uno in an online mockumentary and sitcom called MyMusic.

She was cast as Kacey, a bubbly cocktail waitress, in the sitcom Mixology. However, ABC canceled Mixology after only one season. Originally cast in a guest role, Lengies was upped to a main cast role on FOX's 2016 drama Second Chance (earlier titled Lookinglass).

=== Glee ===
In August 2011, Lengies was cast in the recurring role of Sugar Motta for the third season of Glee. Sugar, who is well-off, self-confident, and has a tin ear, first appeared in the season premiere on September 20, 2011. Since then, Sugar's singing has greatly improved, and she now performs with the main glee club, New Directions; she had her first solo line in the season's tenth episode, "Yes/No". In 2013, Lengies visited her old high school to see how much it had changed, and to speak to the Student Life and Drama students about her journey of how she got to be on Glee.

According to Lengies, Sugar's self-diagnosed Aspergers is part of her character. She said that it was difficult to sing poorly on purpose, especially with piano accompaniment. Sugar's debut was praised by Salon's Matt Zoller Seitz, who said of the new addition to McKinley, "She's awful. She's also an entitled little snot... She's a great character, and I hope we haven't seen the last of her." Entertainment Weekly's Abby West praised Sugar, and with Sue otherwise occupied hoped to see more of Sugar as "a thorn in the Glee club's side". On the other hand, TV Guide "jeered" Sugar, calling her "an off-key addition to the cast". The A.V. Club's Emily VanDerWerff concurred, and said of "I Am Unicorn", "Sugar continues to be one of my least favorite new characters in ages". The Huffington Post named Sugar Motta one of the "Worst TV Characters" in 2012. Respers France was entirely unimpressed with the routine. For her, Sugar's scene following it was one of the episode's few highlights, although she described Sugar as having "a horrible voice".

Following the end of the fourth season, Lengies announced her departure from Glee, citing frustration with not having the opportunity to act as she was hired per episode, though she did return for two appearances in the sixth season.

== Personal life ==
She came out as genderfluid and bisexual in her own documentary series The 'S' Word with Vanessa Lengies in 2017.

In 2025, Lengies married Jens Cromer; later that year, she gave birth to a boy.

== Filmography ==
=== Film ===
Year	Title	Role
2005	The Perfect Man	Amy Pearl
2005	Waiting...	Natasha
2006	The Substance of Things Hoped For	Daphne
2006	Stick It	Joanne Charis
2008	Foreign Exchange	Robyn
2008	Extreme Movie	Carla
2009	Archie's Final Project	Mallory
2009	Still Waiting...	Natasha
2015	We Are Your Friends	Mel
2016	Happy Birthday	Katie Elizondo
2018	Immortal	Alex
2018	I'd Like to Be Alone Now	Lisa
2018	Married Young	Talya
2019	Star Wars: The Rise of Skywalker	Additional voices

=== Television ===
Year	Title	Role	Notes
1995–1996	The Little Lulu Show	Annie Inch	Voice role
1996–2002	Arthur	Emily	24 episodes
1997	Lassie	Charity	Episode: "The Manhunt"
1998	Radio Active	Sarah Leigh	78 episodes
1998	Caillou	Boy / Girl	3 episodes
1998	The Tale of the Great Bunny	Abigail	Television film
1999–2000	Are You Afraid of the Dark?	Vange	26 episodes
1999–2001	Popular Mechanics for Kids	Herself	Host
2000	For Better or For Worse	Elizabeth Patterson	5 episodes
2000	Ratz	Marci Kornbalm	Television film Nominated — Best Performance in a TV Movie (Comedy) - Leading Young Actress
2002–2005	American Dreams	Roxanne Bojarski	Main role Nominated — Young Artist Awards for Best Ensemble in a TV Series (Comedy or Drama); Nominated — Young Artist Awards for Best Performance in a TV Series (Comedy or Drama) - Supporting Young Actress; Nominated — Teen Choice Awards for Choice TV Sidekick
2003–2005	Pet Star	Herself / Judge	4 episodes
2005	8 Simple Rules	Monica	Episode: "The After Party"
2006	Ghost Whisperer	Caitlin Emerson	Episode: "The Vanishing"
2006	Monarch Cove	Sophia Preston	Main role
2006	Split Decision	Ashley	Television film
2007	Moonlight	Leni Hayes	Episode: "Fever"
2007	The Cleaner	Lolly	Episode: "Rag Dolls"
2007	Untitled David Kohan/Max Mutchnick TV Project	Tessa	Television film
2008	Squeegees	Annie Hackett	Television film
2009	Medium	Zoey Lehman	Episode: "Apocalypse... Now?"
2009–2011	Hawthorne	Kelly Epson	Recurring role (Season 1); main role (Seasons 2–3); 29 episodes
2010	Accidentally on Purpose	Tracy	Episode: "Back to School"
2010	CSI: Miami	Shea Williamson	Episode: "Reality Skills"
2010	Rules of Engagement	Julia	Episode: "Refusing to Budget"
2011	Castle	Eliza Winter	Episode: "Poof! You're Dead"
2011–2013, 2015	Glee	Sugar Motta	Recurring role (Seasons 3–4, 6); 26 episodes Nominated — Screen Actors Guild Award for Outstanding Performance by an Ensemble in a Comedy Series
2012–2013	MyMusic	Loco Uno	Recurring role (Season 1); 7 episodes
2014	Mixology	Kacey	Main role
2014	Llama Cop	Dr. Kristen Reynolds	2 episodes
2015	Resident Advisors	Marissa	4 episodes
2016	Second Chance	Alexa	Main role
2016	The Detour	Elf	Episode: "The Drop"
2016–2017	Lego Star Wars: The Freemaker Adventures	Kordi Freemaker	Main role
2017	The 'S' Word with Vanessa Lengies	Herself / Host	Miniseries; also producer
2018	I.R.L.	Catherine VanRicher	2 episodes
2018	Kordi Freemaker	Episode: "From Trenches to Wrenches: The Roger Story"	
2019	A Date By Christmas Eve	Chelsea Simms	Television film (Lifetime)
2020	Heart of the Holidays	Sam	Television film (Hallmark)
2021	Turner & Hooch	Erica	Main role
2022	Christmas in Toyland	Charlie Sawyer	Television film (Hallmark)
2023	True Lies	Quinn	Episode: "Independent Dependents"
2023	Take Me Back for Christmas	Renee	Television film (Hallmark)
2024	Sweet Summer Love	Lindie Summer	Television film
2026	Snowbound for the Holidays	Cassidy Evergreen	Television film (Hallmark)

=== Music videos ===
Year	Title	Artist
2006	"We Run This"	Missy Elliott

== Awards and nomination ==
Year	Award	Category	Work	Result
2001	Young Artist Awards	Best Performance in a TV Movie (Comedy) - Leading Young Actress	Ratz	Nominated
2003	Young Artist Awards	Best Ensemble in a TV Series (Comedy or Drama)	American Dreams	Nominated
2004	Young Artist Awards	Best Performance in a TV Series (Comedy or Drama) - Supporting Young Actress	American Dreams	Nominated
2004	Teen Choice Awards	Choice TV Sidekick	American Dreams	Nominated
2013	Screen Actors Guild Awards	Outstanding Performance by an Ensemble in a Comedy Series	Glee	Nominated

== Discography ==
- Glee: The Music Presents Glease

=== Singles ===
Year	Single	Peak chart positions			
Year	Single	US	CAN	UK	ARIA
2011	"Candyman"	-	-	158	-
2011	"Survivor/I Will Survive"	51	47	97	78
2012	"Cell Block Tango"	-	-	175	-
2012	"—" denotes releases that did not chart				
