= Michael Blodgett =

American actor, novelist and screenwriter (1939–2007)

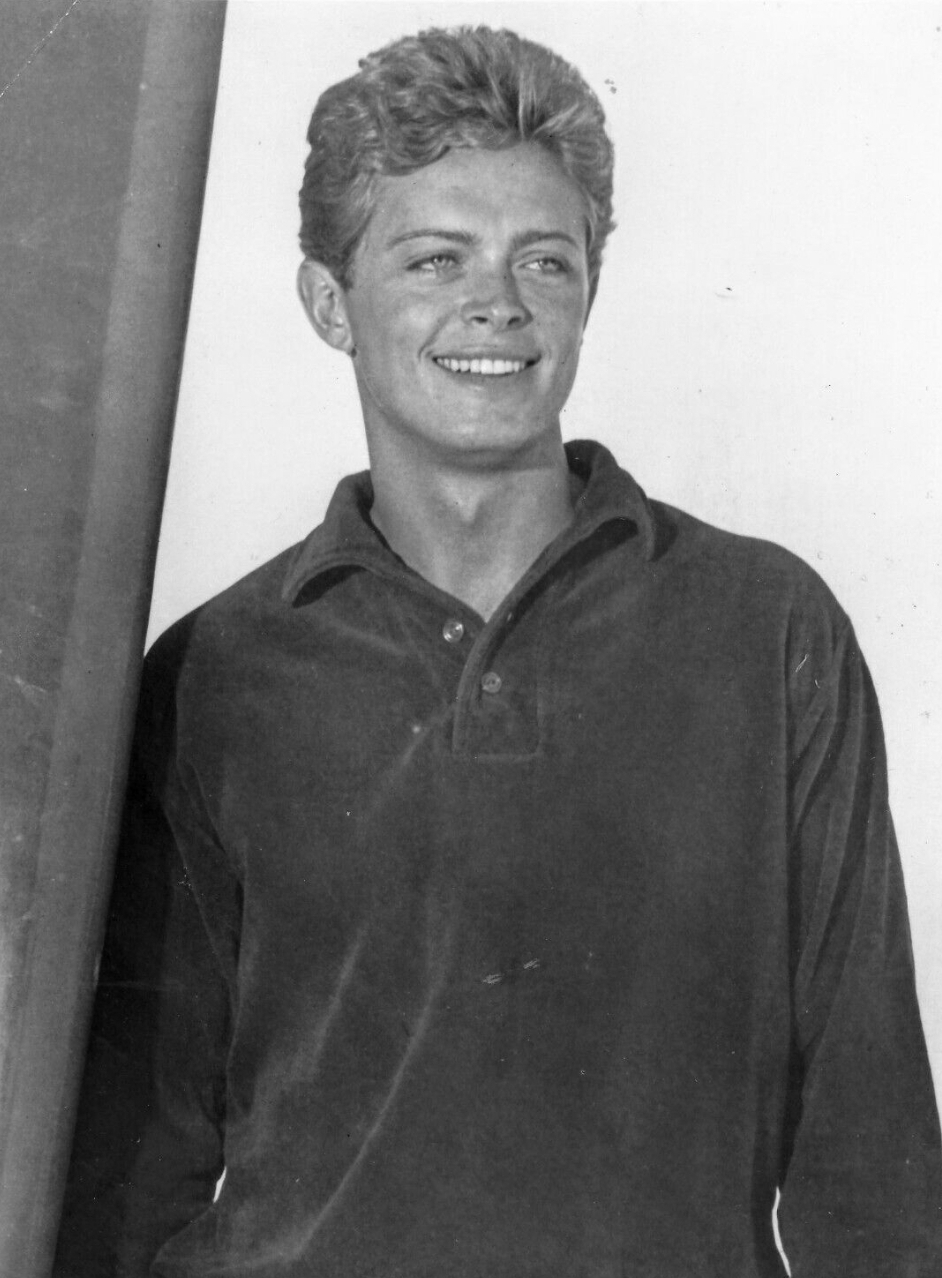
- Blodgett in 1966
- Born: September 26, 1939; Minneapolis, Minnesota, U.S.
- Died: November 14, 2007 (aged 68); Los Angeles, California, U.S.
- Occupations: Actor; novelist; screenwriter
- Years active: 1963–1988
- Spouses: Linn Hammerlund (m. 1957; div. 1960) Sandra Kirchner (m. 1961; div. 1977) Lanetta Wahlgren (m. 1984; div. 1995) Meredith Baxter (m. 1995; div. 2000)
- Children: 3

Michael Blodgett (September 26, 1939 – November 14, 2007) was an American actor, novelist, and screenwriter. Of his many film and television appearances he is best known for his performance as gigolo Lance Rocke in Russ Meyer's 1970 cult classic Beyond the Valley of the Dolls. He retired from acting in the late 1970s and began a writing career.

== Early life and career ==
Born in Minneapolis, Minnesota, Blodgett attended the University of Minnesota before moving to Los Angeles to act. Once in Los Angeles, he earned a degree in political science from Cal State Los Angeles and attended Loyola Law School for one year before turning his attention to acting. In the summer of 1967, Blodgett served as emcee of The Groovy Show, a beach-party dance show for teens on Los Angeles's KHJ-TV. In 1968, Blodgett moved to KTTV, where he hosted a 90-minute Saturday night talk show, The Michael Blodgett Show.

After his role in Beyond the Valley of the Dolls in 1970, Blodgett appeared in the Western There Was a Crooked Man..., opposite Kirk Douglas and Henry Fonda, and then The Velvet Vampire (1971). Throughout the 1970s, Blodgett appeared in films and guest starring roles in television series including Barnaby Jones and The Secrets of Isis. Having become dissatisfied with the type of roles he was being offered, Blodgett made his last film appearance in 1978's Disco Fever and then shifted his focus to writing novels and screenplays. He would make a cameo appearance in the 1988 adaptation of his novel Hero and the Terror, and he also contributed to interview segments in the documentary Above, Beneath and Beyond the Valley, which was featured on the 2006 DVD release of Beyond the Valley of the Dolls.

In 1982, Blodgett released his first novel, Captain Blood, followed by his second novel Hero and the Terror, that same year. His third novel, The White Raven, was released in 1986 and was later adapted into a 1998 film starring Ron Silver. With his writing partner Dennis Shryack, Blodgett penned the screenplays for Rent-A-Cop (1987) starring Burt Reynolds, Turner & Hooch (with others, 1989) starring Tom Hanks, and Run (1991) starring Patrick Dempsey.

== Personal life and death ==
Blodgett was married four times and had three daughters. His daughter Lucette is married to actor Miles Fisher.

Blodgett died at his home in Los Angeles of an apparent heart attack.

== Filmography ==
Film
Year	Film	Role	Notes
1965	A Swingin' Summer	Beach bum	Credited as Mike Blodgett
1967	40 Guns to Apache Pass	Mike Malone	
1967	The Trip	Lover	
1967	Catalina Caper	Bob Draper	Credited as Mike Blodgett
1970	Beyond the Valley of the Dolls	Lance Rocke	
1970	There Was a Crooked Man...	Coy Cavendish	
1971	The Velvet Vampire	Lee Ritter	
1972	The Carey Treatment	Roger Hudson	
1974	The Ultimate Thrill	Tom	Alternative title: The Ultimate Chase
1978	Disco Fever	Tommy Aspen	
1987	Rent-a-Cop	–	Co-screenwriter
1988	Hero and the Terror	–	Co-screenwriter
1989	Turner & Hooch	–	Co-screenwriter
1991	Run	–	Co-screenwriter
1998	The White Raven	–	Screenwriter
Television
Year	Title	Role	Notes
1961	Macbeth	Malcolm	Television movie
1964	McHale's Navy	Boy on the park bench	1 episode
1964	The Alfred Hitchcock Hour	Dancer - Apollo	1 episode
1965	Never Too Young	Tad	Unknown episodes
1966	The Munsters	Jim	1 episode
1966	Man in the Square Suit	Gary Young	Television movie
1966	Meet Me in St. Louis	John Truitt	Television movie
1967	Daniel Boone	Sam Linn	2 episodes
1967	Bonanza	Billy Slater	Episode: "False Witness"
1970	Family Affair	Mike West	2 episodes
1970	To Rome with Love	Hank Martin	1 episode
1970	Night Gallery	John Michael Fearing	1 episode
1971	Ironside	Matthew Roberts	1 episode
1971	Marcus Welby, M.D.	Vince Kolski	1 episode
1973	Barnaby Jones	Kirk	1 episode
1975	Barbary Coast	Whiting	1 episode
1976	Electra Woman and Dyna Girl	King Alex X of Tourembourg	2 episodes
1976	The Secrets of Isis	Rick Mason's Double	2 episodes
1992	Revenge on the Highway	–	Television movie Writer, co-producer

== Novels ==
- Captain Blood (1982)
- Hero and the Terror (1982)
- The White Raven (1986)
