= Ernie Lively =

American actor and acting coach (1947–2021)

- Lively in 2016
- Born: Ernest Wilson Brown Jr. January 29, 1947; Baltimore, Maryland, U.S.
- Died: June 3, 2021 (aged 74); Los Angeles, California, U.S.
- Occupations: Actor; acting coach
- Years active: 1975–2021
- Spouse: Elaine McAlpin (m. 1979)
- Children: Lori; Jason; Robin; Blake; Eric
- Relatives: Ryan Reynolds (son-in-law); Bart Johnson (stepson-in-law)

Ernie Lively (born Ernest Wilson Brown Jr.; January 29, 1947 – June 3, 2021) was an American actor and acting coach, the adoptive father of actors Lori Lively, Jason Lively, and Robyn Lively, and father of actors Eric Lively and Blake Lively. He took his wife's name from her prior marriage to Ronald Lively, changing his surname from Brown to Lively.

== Life and career ==
Lively was born in Baltimore, Maryland, the son of Beatrice Gray (née Walton; 1927–1994) and Ernest Wilson Brown Sr. (1919–2007).

Lively may be best known for his roles in Passenger 57, The Sisterhood of the Traveling Pants and The Sisterhood of the Traveling Pants 2. In the latter two films, he played the father of a character played by his own real-life daughter, Blake.

Lively's credits as a character actor date back to the 1970s, beginning with TV roles on shows including The Waltons and The Dukes of Hazzard. He appeared in movies including Turner & Hooch, Air America, Passenger 57 and The Beverly Hillbillies and on popular TV shows like The X-Files, That '70s Show and The West Wing. In 2005, he played the father of his daughter Blake’s character in The Sisterhood of the Traveling Pants, and he returned for its 2008 sequel. Lively was also a director, directing Blake in her film debut, “Sandman.” A father of five, he influenced all of his children as they pursued acting careers. Before acting, Lively was a captain in the U.S. Marine Corps having served in the Vietnam War, and was an English professor.

== Personal life and death ==
In 1979, Lively married talent manager Elaine Lively (née McAlpin). They were the parents of Blake and Eric Lively, both actors. He adopted Elaine's children from her previous marriage: Lori, Robyn and Jason Lively.

He resided in Heber City, Utah, with his wife. In 2003, Lively suffered a heart attack. In November 2013, Lively was treated with stem-cell therapy as part of a new experimental retrograde gene procedure.

Lively died on June 3, 2021, in Los Angeles of cardiac complications.

== Filmography ==
- The Waltons (1975, TV Series) as Railroad Conductor
- McCloud (1977, TV Series) as Bartender
- The Million Dollar Dixie Deliverance (1978, TV Movie) as Danny
- The Dukes of Hazzard (1979-1984, TV Series) as Longstreet B. Davenport / Clyde, The Guard / Dobro Doolan
- It's My Turn (1980) as Man at Restaurant
- Drop-Out Father (1982, TV Movie) as Conductor
- Scarecrow and Mrs. King (1985, TV Series) as Travis Wayne
- Secret Admirer (1985) as Guard
- Badge of the Assassin (1985, TV Movie) as U.S. Marshal
- Misfits of Science (1985, TV Series) as Army Officer
- The Children of Times Square (1986, TV Movie)
- Fuzzbucket (1986, TV Series) as Teacher #1
- Wisdom (1986)
- Warm Hearts, Cold Feet (1987, TV Movie) as Ernie
- Convicted: A Mother's Story (1987, TV Movie)
- In the Mood (1987) as Chief Kelsey (Papa Bear)
- Hollywood-Monster (1987) as Production Manager
- Into the Homeland (1987, TV Movie) as Tom Burnside
- The Tracker (1988, TV Movie) as Bob
- Scandal in a Small Town (1988, TV Movie) as Jeremy Travis
- The Secret Life of Kathy McCormick (1988, TV Movie) as Jeff
- Buckeye and Blue (1988) as Jess Thatcher
- Turner & Hooch (1989) as Motel Clerk
- An Innocent Man (1989) as Donatelli's Dealer
- Shocker (1989) as Warden
- Hard to Kill (1990) as LAPD Captain
- Follow Your Heart (1990, TV Movie) as Mitch
- Voices Within: The Lives of Truddi Chase (1990, TV Movie) as Paul
- The Knife and Gun Club (1990, TV Movie) as Ralph
- Air America (1990) as Truck Driver
- The Less-Than-Perfect Daughter (1991, TV Series) as Col. Deke Grimwald
- The Torkelsons (1991, TV pilot) as Jacob Presley
- For the Very First Time (1991, TV Movie) as Mr. O'Neil
- Showdown in Little Tokyo (1991) as Detective Nelson
- The Man in the Moon (1991) as Will Sanders
- Past Midnight (1992) as Detective Allan Tobias
- Breaking the Silence (1992, TV Movie)
- Stop! Or My Mom Will Shoot (1992) as Man at Airport
- Sleepwalkers (1992) as Animal Control Officer
- Passenger 57 (1992) as Chief Leonard Biggs
- Overkill: The Aileen Wuornos Story (1992, TV Movie) as Maj. Dan Henry
- The Beverly Hillbillies (1993) as Briggs
- Roseanne (1993, TV Series) as Kirk
- My Family (1995) as Sergeant
- The X-Files (1995, TV Series) as Sheriff John Teller
- Seinfeld (1995, TV Series) as Zeke
- Malibu Shores (1996, TV Series) as Mr. Morrison
- Renegade (1996, TV Series) as Sheriff
- Mulholland Falls (1996) as Construction Foreman
- Fire Down Below (1997) as Todd
- Senseless (1998) as Coach Brandau
- The Legend of Cryin' Ryan (1998) as Leonard Greene
- Goodbye Lover (1998) as Sheriff
- Wanted (1998) as Sheriff
- Balloon Farm (1999, TV Movie) as Tom Williams
- The Thirteenth Floor (1999) as 30's Cop
- My Little Assassin (1999, TV Movie) as Charlie Baron
- That '70s Show (2000, TV Series) as Ted
- The West Wing (2000-2005, TV Series) as Mr. Loch / Georgia Congressman
- American Pie 2 (2001) as Sergeant
- Crossing Jordan (2002, TV Series) as Sheriff Roper
- The Drew Carey Show (2004, TV Series) as Mike
- The Sisterhood of the Traveling Pants (2005) as Franz Vreeland
- The Suite Life of Zack & Cody (2005, TV Series) as Irving Fitzpatrick (voice)
- The Darwin Awards (2006) as RV Salesman
- Ghost Whisperer (2006, TV Series) as Ranger Neher
- Simon Says (2006) as Pig
- The Art of Travel (2008) as Mr. Layne
- The Sisterhood of the Traveling Pants 2 (2008) as Franz Vreeland
- The Perfect Game (2009) as Coach Sam Hicks
- Saving Grace (2009-2010, TV Series) as Mr. Dewey
- Memphis Beat (2010, TV Series) as Doc Boswell
- Outlaw (2010, TV Series)
- Svetlana (2011, TV Series) as Liam's Dad
- Shadow (2013, Short)
- Waffle Street (2015) as Wright Adams
- Razor (2017) as Ernie
- Looking Glass (2018) as Tommy
- Phobic (2020) as Jack Sanders
