= Monday Morning (1990 film) =

1990 American thriller film

- VHS cover with the alternate title Class of Fear
- Directed by: Don Murphy
- Written by: Don Murphy
- Produced by: Sheila Longfoot; Don Murphy (Executive Producer)
- Cinematography: John B. Aronson
- Edited by: Jesse Semon; Dixie Fusillo (uncredited)
- Music by: Bill Johnson
- Production company: Team Angry Filmworks
- Distributed by: Monarch Media (theatrical)
- Release date: 1990
- Running time: 97 minutes
- Country: United States
- Language: English

Monday Morning, also known as Class of Fear, is a 1990 American thriller film directed by Don Murphy.

== Plot ==
A poor kid named Bobby moves to a new school. Bobby begins dating Noreen, the sister of James, the son of the mayor. James's girlfriend and Noreen's friend Ginny begins acting flirtatious with Bobby to make her boyfriend jealous. When she aggressively fondles Bobby as he is driving her home from a party, it leads to a car crash in which she is injured and Bobby. James, who feels that Bobby does not belong at the school, accuses Bobby of kidnapping Ginny. James later brings a gun to school to threaten Bobby, but the two get into fight over the gun, during which a teacher is shot. Bobby holds the class hostage at gunpoint to try to plead his innocence.

== Cast ==
- Noah Blake as Bobby Parker
- Julianne McNamara as Noreen Hedges
- Brandon Hooper as James Hedges
- Karl Wiedergott as Bill Cobbs
- Jason Lively as Chip Brooks
- Shannon Absher as Ginny Amsden
- Brian Cole as Mark Norris
- Ricky Dean Logan as Reilly
- Marta Martin as Maria
- Nicole Berger as Nancy
- Charlotte Swazey as Carol
- Lisa Rinna as Susan Pevensie
- Vincent Craig Dupree as Tommy Woods
- Fitz Houston as Chief Woods (as Fitzhugh G. Houston)
- Paul Henry Itkin as Frank Parker
- Annie O'Donnell as Marion Parker
- Phyllis Hamlin as Vicki Wallace
- Tom Finnegan as Principal McMahon
- Joe Lerer as Biology Teacher
- John Idakitis as Officer Burns
- James Harding as Danny Parker
- Stephanie Wilson as Kelley Parker
- Joe Flood as Bouncer
- Richard McNally as Foreman
- Janis Jennings as Burger Waitress
- Charlie Holliday as Burger Manager
- Traci Anne Reed as Girl in Fight
- J.C. Wendel as Girl in Fight
- Andrea Szabo as Girl in Fight
- Catherine Bolling as Girl in Fight
- Richard Harder as Special Team Capt
- Terry Donovan-Smith as Officer Jones (as T.D. Smith)
- Taylor Kasch as Other Officer
- Megan Stait as Jessie Parker
- Sherri Lubov as Mrs. Amsden
- William Henry as Mr. Amsden
- Lol Levy as Drunk in Jail (as Lawrence Levy)
- Jesse Semon as Sharpshooter
- Jon Kroll as Special Team
- Hal Stellini as Special Team
- Zia Iampietro as News Crew
- Randal Powell as News Crew
- Ann Herrera as Paramedic
- Jeffrey Overdorf as Paramedic
- Roscoe Plikerd as Gary
- Joseph Meyer as Jailer
- Rozee Dominguez as Bar Waitress
- Tom O'Grady as Chef
- Neil Stromin as Bartender

== Production ==
The film was shot by Don Murphy as his thesis project while at USC. It was his first and last directorial effort, after which he switched to producing.

== Release ==
The film received theatrical distribution in the United States and Canada through Monarch Media, in the United Kingdom and Ireland through Cannon Film Distributors, and in Spain through Filmax.

The film was released on 1982 on VHS under the alternate title Class of Fear, which is identical to Monday Morning except for the opening titles. MVD Rewind's Blu-ray release of Monday Morning contains this VHS version under the alternate title Class of Fear and also includes an interview with Don Murphy, a "Portrait of a Producer" segment on Murphy, and a collectible mini-poster.

== Reception ==
Reviewer Corey Danna of horrorgeeklife.com wrote, "While it all sounds pretty great on paper, Monday Morning never quite makes it to cult film status. It hasn't aged particularly well, and at times it almost felt like a chore to get through it. Most of the acting felt a little too far over the top. It was fun to see talent like Lisa Rinna (Days of Our Lives) and Jason Lively (Night of the Creeps) appear in a supporting capacity. It certainly wasn't a waste of time, but inexperience was the feeling I was getting as I watched it. It's not something I could make it through again, but I'm happy to have finally crossed another off my list."

Reviewer Sebastian of furiouscinema.com wrote, "Now, as much as it's an interesting story and sort of well made, the whole thing is a bit annoying as the principal character keeps being blamed for things he didn't do, kind of the high school experience where the bullies keep getting away with things. Yet it's so predictable that once things escalate it seems that he is actually the perpetrator whereas he is constantly being harassed by the little fascisty fratboyish dudes, he's just too clumsy. Infuriating is what it is, and most characters just behave rather stupidly. Luckily, the ending is a bit more multi-faceted than the run up to it, and I left watching the movie on a positive note, even though overall it kind of drags and doesn't really leave a lasting impression. For a thesis movie however, which is what it is, a low budget, school project, it's almost impressive."

DVDCorner wrote, "On paper, 1990's 'Monday Morning' sounds like a hard hitting drama about entitlement, broken homes, the class system, bullying, and gun violence. Alas, all of those heavy themes are brushed aside here with a decidedly clumsy, surface level script by Don Murphy who seems to be in over his head pulling writing and directing duties. This is a very low-budget, cheaply made movie that feels more like a sensationalized after school special more than anything. Under more capable hands, 'Monday Morning' could have been a very prescient, timely, and intense high school drama given the rise of gun violence at schools over the past couple decades. As is, it’s a very simplistic story of the tensions between a have and a have not that fizzles out in the end (especially with that puzzling freeze frame tag and narration)."

Outlaw Vern wrote, "Murphy mostly made his bones by recognizing there was an audience for non-super-hero comic books, video games and toy cartoons before Hollywood at large caught on. MONDAY MORNING is more connected to where he was at early on, making indie crime movies with Tarantino, Bryan Singer and Larry Clark. But it’s way cruder and cornier than those movies, so its value is pretty much just as a time capsule of people looking goofy while trying to be serious. That's okay. I've seen worse."

Reviewer Christopher Zabel of doblu.com wrote, "Contrived characters and slipshod acting performances congeal around the hammy class conflict which lies at Monday Morning's well-meaning heart. The awful events which unwind in the final act creates flashes of tension and suspense but are a pale imitation of accomplished filmmaking."

A reviewer for highdefdigest wrote, "The tone is all over the map. You'll have a serious scene undercut by a puzzling gag. One to keep a look out for involves a character flicking the teacher’s blood on another student for the hell of it. Don’t get me wrong, I laughed at that moment because it came out of nowhere, and I was desperate for some energy that felt alive. But it shows you that this movie is so confused about what it wants to be. And don't get me started on the head-scratching ending. In no reality would something like that happen, and it should almost be seen to be believed."
