= Movie Insider =

Film information website

- Website type: Film News and Information
- Available in: English
- Owner: Brian D. Renner
- Website: www.movieinsider.com
- Commercial: Yes
- Registration: Optional
- Launched: July 1999
- Current status: Active

Movie Insider is a website offering behind-the-scenes film information about upcoming Hollywood releases. Visitors can access daily movie news updates and informational profiles of films in early stages of development and pre-production. Originally started as a relatively small online publication, the site grew to more than 1.1 million visitors monthly by 2010.

Movie Insider has a database dating back to 2012 of films that have been released organized by month.

== See also ==
- AICN
- Cinema Blend
- Dark Horizons
- JoBlo
- ShowBIZ Data
