= Bart Johnson =

American actor (born 1970)

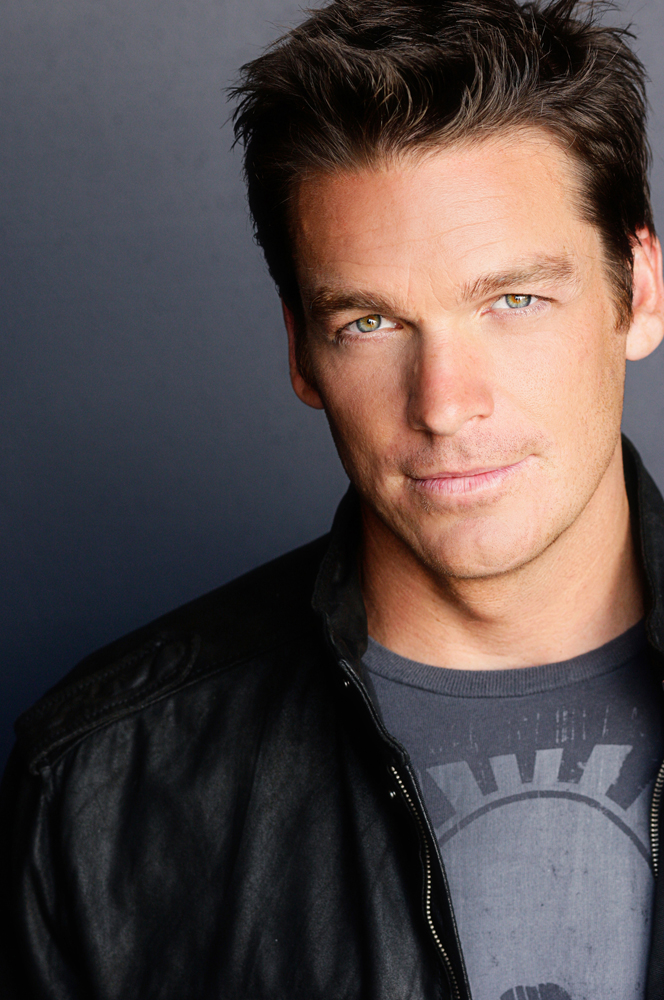
- Johnson in 2009
- Born: Barton Robert Johnson; December 13, 1970 (age 55); Hollywood, California, U.S.
- Education: Yale University
- Occupation: Actor
- Years active: 1993–present
- Spouse: Robyn Lively (m. 1999)
- Children: 3
- Relatives: Blake Lively (sister-in-law); Jason Lively (brother-in-law); Lori Lively (sister-in-law); Eric Lively (brother-in-law)

Barton Robert Johnson (born December 13, 1970) is an American actor, best known for his role as Coach Jack Bolton in the High School Musical film series. He was exposed to the TV and film industry at a young age and began his career in the mid-1990s. His film debut was My Family in 1995. He has also appeared in recurring roles on TV shows Hyperion Bay, Lifetime's The Client List, and Hawaii Five-0. He also appeared in the 2018 adaptation of Little Women.

== Early life ==
Johnson was born in Hollywood, California, one of seven children. Their mother Charlene Johnson is a television hairstylist, and so Bart spent much of his early childhood on television sets such as The Brady Bunch, Mork and Mindy, and Charlie's Angels. At the age of 15, he moved from California to Utah, where he graduated from Wasatch High School. His family converted a flour mill near Park City, Utah into the Johnson Mill Bed & Breakfast, which Johnson later purchased from his parents. His first acting experience was a production of West Side Story. Johnson attended college at the University of Utah as a pre-med student before deciding to transfer to Yale University's drama program.

== Career ==
Johnson first appeared in film with My Family in 1995. He then had guest roles on the following TV shows: Diagnosis Murder (1995), Walker, Texas Ranger (1997), Sunset Beach (1997), Jag (1997, 2004), and Babylon 5 (1998). From 1998 to 1999, he appeared on The WB's television show Hyperion Bay as local bully Nelson Tucker.

He is well known for his role as the High School Musical series' Coach Jack Bolton, the father of the main protagonist Troy Bolton (Zac Efron). He was invited to audition by director Kenny Ortega, who became a family friend after Johnson's mother's work as a hair stylist on the set of Newsies. Ortega persuaded executives to accept Johnson for the role after he auditioned with little background knowledge on his role.

Johnson had a recurring role on the TV series The Client List for Lifetime as Beau Berkhalter as well as on Gortimer Gibbon's Life On Normal Street for Amazon, alongside his wife Robyn Lively and their three children. He starred in a Hallmark movie, The Christmas Spirit, alongside Nicollette Sheridan. Johnson also appeared in the 2013 vampire comedy Vamp U. He portrayed Senator Gordon H. Smith in The Saratov Approach, a film based on the 1998 kidnapping of LDS missionaries in Saratov, Russia. He has worked on multiple projects with his brothers, including a short film about the brothers' adventures in Mexico entitled "The Run," as well as "Waffle Street," an independent movie filmed in Lehi, Utah. He appeared alongside wife Robyn Lively and actress Katee Sackhoff in the independent film Lockdown (later renamed A Deadly Obsession) in 2011. In 2018, he played Papa March in a modern-day adaptation of Little Women. In 2020, he appeared as Siena Agudong's character's father on Hawaii Five-0.

Johnson is the owner of the Johnson Mill Bed & Breakfast in Midway, Utah, near Park City, Utah. According to a 2008 website article WorkHomeYou.com, Redbook determined it to be one of the four most romantic in the country. In 2012, it was awarded the AAA Four Diamond Award. Johnson converted the bed and breakfast into a treatment center for those recovering from drug addictions.

== Personal life ==
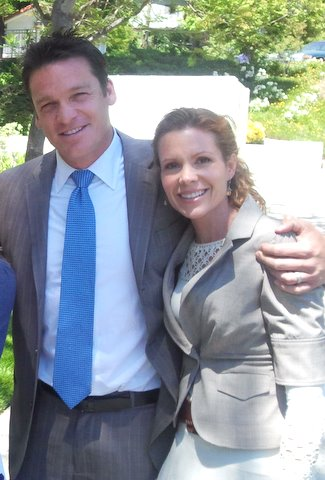
Johnson with wife Robyn Lively

Johnson's brothers, Adam and Brad, also work in film. He is married to actress Robyn Lively, sister of actresses Blake Lively and Lori Lively and actors Eric Lively and Jason Lively. Bart and Robyn have three children: daughter Kate and sons Baylen and Wyatt Blake. In 2019, he accompanied his son Baylen on a humanitarian trip to Samoa, where they joined a group of youth to build a classrooms for two weeks. He and wife Robyn Lively are practicing members of the Church of Jesus Christ of Latter-day Saints.

== Filmography ==
Year	Film	Role	Notes
1993	Crossroads	Frosty	Television series (Episode: "The Last Roundup")
1994	Saved by the Bell: The New Class	Clint	Television series (Episode: "Back at the Ranch")
1995	Diagnosis: Murder	Officer Black	Television series (Episode: "A Blast from the Past")
1995	My Family	Young Officer	
1995	Thunder Alley	Buzzard Boy	Television series (Episode: "Buzz Off, Buzzard Boy")
1997	The Date	Biff	
1997	Sunset Beach	Man	Television series
1997	Clueless	Shnerv Mchnick	Television series (Episode: "I'm in with the Out Crowd")
1997	Walker, Texas Ranger	Wyatt McLain	Television series (Episode: "The Fighting McLains")
1997	JAG	Lt. Johnson	Television series (Episode: "Impact")
1998	Babylon 5	Ranger	Television series (Episode: "The Paragon of Animals")
1998–1999	Hyperion Bay	Nelson Tucker	Television series
2003	Tremors	Jared Mack	Television series (Episode: "Water Hazard")
2004	CSI: Miami	Matt Bolton	Television series (Episode: "Blood Moon")
2004	JAG	Army Specialist Ray Scanlon	Television series (Episode: "Camp Delta")
2004	Strong Medicine	Jake Matousak	Television series (Episode: "Foreign Bodies")
2006	High School Musical	Coach Jack Bolton	Television movie
2006	Eve	Anthony	Television series (Episode: "Diva Day Care")
2006	Simon Says	Garth	
2007	Happy Valley	Doug	
2007	Taking Five	Mark Thompson	
2007	Daddy Day Camp	Phil Jacobs	
2007	High School Musical 2	Coach Jack Bolton	Television movie
2007	Las Vegas	Barry Bertowski	Television series (Episode: "Head Games")
2008	Desertion	Daniel	
2008	Murder.com	Garner	
2008	High School Musical 3: Senior Year	Coach Jack Bolton	
2008	Animals	Vaughn	
2008	"The Run"	Scott	Short film; also writer and director
2009	The Harsh Life of Veronica Lambert	Terry	
2009	Evil Angel	Jeff Morgan	
2009	The Cell 2	Skylar	
2009	Locker 13	Eugene MacClemore	
2009	The Yankles	Sledge Dixon	
2010	Monster Mutt	Jeff Taylor	
2010	Beautiful Wave		
2010	Stuck		
2010	The Saratov Approach	Senator Gordon H. Smith	
2012	6 Bucks and a Bottle of Water	As himself	Documentary internet film; also producer
2013	The Christmas Spirit	Daniel Huntslar	Television film
2014	Saints and Soldiers: The Void	Captain Derrick Davis	
2015	Gortimer Gibbons' Life on Normal Street	Will Fuller/Bucky Fuller	
2015	Hoxsey		
2015	NCIS	Dean Hudson	Television series (Episode: "Incognito")
2017	Small Town Crime	Carl Nevile	
2018	Little Women	Papa March	
2018	All American	Coach Hanson; football booster	Television series (Episode: "All Eyez On Me")
2020	The Rookie	Jerry Havel	Television series (Episode: "Day of Death")
2020	Hawaii Five-0	Jake	Television series (Episode: "E ho'i na keiki oki uaua o na pali")
2020	Held	Henry	
2021	Once I Was Engaged	Curt Carrington	
2022	9-1-1: Lone Star	Stanley	Television series (Episode: "Spring Cleaning")
2022	Strong Fathers, Strong Daughters	Steve Parston	Television movie
2023	Quantum Leap	First Officer Paul Kirk	Television series (Episode: "The Friendly Skies")
2023	High School Musical: The Musical: The Series	Bart Johnson/Coach Bolton	Recurring role (season 4)
2024	Someone Like You	Dr. Jim Allen	
2024	Landman	Patrick Ramsey	Television series (Episode: "Landman")
