= Hollywood-Monster =

Ghost Chase
- Theatrical release poster by Renato Casaro
- Directed by: Roland Emmerich
- Screenplay by: Roland Emmerich; Thomas Kubisch
- Story by: Roland Emmerich; Oliver Eberle
- Starring: Jason Lively; Tim McDaniel; Jill Whitlow; Chuck Mitchell; Paul Gleason
- Cinematography: Karl Walter Lindenlaub
- Edited by: Pia Fritsche
- Music by: Hubert Bartholomae
- Production company: Centropolis Film Productions
- Distributed by: Filmverlag der Autoren
- Release date: June 25, 1987
- Running time: 85 minutes
- Countries: West Germany; United States
- Language: English

Hollywood-Monster (working title - released as Ghost Chase in the United States) is a 1987 horror comedy film directed by Roland Emmerich, about a film crew working in a haunted mansion. Emmerich's third film, it starred Jason Lively, Jill Whitlow, Paul Gleason, Chuck Mitchell, and Tim McDaniel. A co-production between West Germany and the United States, the film was released theatrically in Germany on June 25, 1987.

== Plot ==
Two cousins, Fred and Warren, live together in Hollywood. Fred, an aspiring horror-movie director with developed skills in SFX and animatronics, desperately tries to shoot his first movie in their house, but Warren, who plays the main male protagonist, keeps on flirting with Laurie, the main actress. When she can't stand it anymore, the project is over, and the bills are piling up.

Out of the blue, Warren is called out to the reading of his grandfather's will and testament. The boys end up with an old clock, inhabited with the spirit of Louis, Warren's grandfather's deformed butler. The benevolent spirit, having appeared to Fred in the night, shows him a flashback of the day he and Warren's grandfather Karl died. Karl poisoned himself, and sealed himself in the basement with all his money to prevent his family from getting any. The butler coincidentally died by falling down stairs. The dream inspires Fred in making a new script for which he builds an animatronic version of the butler, whose spirit proceedes to inhabit the artificial body.

The butler and the boys will help each other as they face a new problem: the son of Warren's grandfather's partner who managed to swindle Warren's family out of their property, Producer Stan Gordon, who wants the grandfather's heritage to be kept secret, and try to get Fred's new movie made. It will all end in a race against the clock in an old house basement, and a fight against a demented ghost armor, as the movie pays homage to the late 1950s-to-1970s science fiction B movies.

== Cast ==
- Jason Lively as Warren McCloud
- Tim McDaniel as Fred
- Jill Whitlow as Laurie Sanders
- Leonard Lansink as Karl
- Paul Gleason as Stan Gordon
- Ian MacNaughton as Frederick McCloud
- Chuck Mitchell as Mr. Rosenbaum
- Cynthia Frost as Secretary
- Andreas Kovac-Zemen as Pawn Shop Owner
- Toby Kaye as Laurie's Girlfriend
- Ernie Lively as Production Manager
- Julian Curry as Lawyer
- Larry Pennell as Bum

== Production ==
Filming took place primarily in the Swabian town of Sindelfingen utilizing old factory buildings as shooting locations. Roland Emmerich secured financing on the film by preselling distribution rights to foreign territories.

== Release ==
The film was theatrically released in Germany by Filmverlag der Autoren on June 25, 1987.

== Home media ==
Ghost Chase was released on video cassette in the United States on February 7, 1990 by M.C.E.G. Virgin Home Entertainment. On March 13, 2001, the film was released on DVD by Image Entertainment.
