= ShowBIZ Data =

- ShowBIZ Data Home Page
- Website type: Film
- Available in: English
- Owners: ShowBIZ Data Holdings, LLC
- Creator: Oliver Eberle
- Website: showbizdata.com
- Commercial: Yes
- Registration: Not compulsory
- Launched: 1997
- Current status: inactive

ShowBIZ Data is a website that tracks domestic and international box office and other performance related information. Established by producer Oliver Eberle in 1997, and based on the principle that understanding the information based upon which movies are made is key to working in Hollywood, ShowBIZData.com is a comprehensive entertainment industry database online. The company's flagship service provides entertainment professionals and enthusiasts with a fast and easy way to obtain detailed information about the film industry.

Since 2012, the website (showbizdata.com) has not been active.

== See also ==
- AICN
- The Movie Insider
- Cinema Blend
- Dark Horizons
- Joblo
