= Held (film) =

2020 film directed by Travis Cluff and Chris Lofing

- Film poster
- Directed by: Travis Cluff; Chris Lofing
- Written by: Jill Awbrey
- Starring: Jill Awbrey; Bart Johnson
- Production company: Tremendum Pictures
- Distributed by: Magnet Releasing
- Release date: October 21, 2020 (FrightFest)
- Running time: 94 minutes
- Country: United States
- Language: English
- Box office: $142,817

Held is a 2020 American thriller film directed by Travis Cluff and Chris Lofing, written by Jill Awbrey, and starring Jill Awbrey and Bart Johnson.

== Premise ==
A woman named Emma is transported to a modern, gated rental house. She's joined by her husband Henry. They soon find themselves taken captive in the house by a mysterious man who communicates via intercom, demanding obedience and delivering painful electrical shocks when Emma and Henry fail to comply.

== Cast ==
- Jill Awbrey as Emma
  - Jana Claire Price as Young Emma
- Bart Johnson as Henry
- Travis Cluff as The Voice / Nathan
- Zack Gold as Ryan Sullivan
- Rez Kempton as Joe

== Release ==
Held premiered in the United Kingdom on October 21, 2020 as part of FrightFest, and it was released in the United States on April 9, 2021.

== Reception ==
On the review aggregator website Rotten Tomatoes, 39% of 31 critics' reviews are positive. The website's consensus reads: "Its core idea is solid, but Held squanders most of its intriguingly nasty potential with lackluster overall execution." On Metacritic, the film has a weighted average score of 46 out of 100 based on 7 critics, which the site labels as "mixed or average" reviews.

Frank Scheck of The Hollywood Reporter gave the film a positive review, commenting that "it proves compelling throughout, thanks to the novelty of its premise and the tightly controlled direction by the filmmakers." The review also praises the film for "cannily exploiting #MeToo themes and the opportunities for cinematic mayhem provided by technology-driven smart homes." Chuck Bowen of Slant Magazine criticized the film for not living up to the potential of its plot's "perverse scenario." Writing for RogerEbert.com, Glenn Kenny gave the film a negative review, criticizing its perceived "weak argumentation" and "rampant plot holes."
