= Neat and Tidy: Adventures Beyond Belief =

British comedy adventure television series

Neat and Tidy: Adventures Beyond Belief (also known as Adventures Beyond Belief) is a British comedy adventure television series that aired for five episodes from February 12 to March 11, 1988, on Channel 4 and was created by Tony Brooke, Kevin Lygo and Marcus Thompson. It featured a soundtrack of original Elvis Presley music including Guitar Man (song) as the theme song.

== Series overview ==
Wimpish hero, Nick Neat (Skyler Cole) is a motor mechanic riding around the world on a Harley Davidson motorcycle on the run for a murder he did not commit. He comes across Tena Tidy (Jill Whitlow), the daughter of a gangster, on the run from school in search of "beer and biology". Assorted evil villains pursue the pair, including Elke Sommer, Graham Stark and Thick Wilson.

== Cast ==
- Nick Neat (motor mechanic) - Skyler Cole
- Tena Tidy (little rich girl) - Jill Whitlow
- Bruno von Kleff (headmistress) - Elke Sommer
- Scratcher (villain) - Graham Stark
- Ten Percent (villain) - Thick Wilson
- Mrs. Loretta Kemble - Stella Stevens

== Episodes ==
No.	Title	Directed by	Written by	Original release date
1	TBA	Marcus Thompson	Kevin Lygo, Anthony Rooke, Marcus Thompson	February 12, 1988
2	"Morocco"	Marcus Thompson	Kevin Lygo, Anthony Rooke, Marcus Thompson	February 19, 1988
Nick and Tena find themselves in a casbah
3	"Wild West"	Marcus Thompson	Kevin Lygo, Anthony Rooke, Marcus Thompson	February 26, 1988
Nick and Tena are in the Wild West fighting against barroom bullies and a half-naked sheriff
4	"India"	Marcus Thompson	Kevin Lygo, Anthony Rooke, Marcus Thompson	March 4, 1988
Nick and Tena are in India, where Tena is tricked into joining the harem of a Maharaja
5	TBA	Marcus Thompson	Kevin Lygo, Anthony Rooke, Marcus Thompson	March 11, 1988
Final episode

== Reception ==
Brian Taylor of Hull Daily Mail wrote, "If you like humour which is bizarre in situations which are highly improbable, Neat and Tidy is your kind of programme." Ian Macfarlane said in Cambridge Evening News, "Look out for an explosion of action, adventure and wild humour, to the sound of original Elvis Presley recordings, in this new series."

In a review of the first episode, critic Renata Rubnikowicz suggested it would be a "zany, wacky, a cult comedy hit", writing it was "definitely a jolly first episode, with Mafia connections and Euro locations". The Guardian's Sandy Smithies stated, "this wildly camp new comedy is worth taking the earplugs out for".
