= Thunder Run (film) =

- Theatrical release poster
- Directed by: Gary Hudson
- Screenplay by: Charles Davis; Carol Heyer
- Story by: Carol Lynn; Cliff Wenger
- Produced by: Carol Lynn; Cliff Wenger
- Starring: Forrest Tucker; John Ireland; John Shepherd; Jill Whitlow; Wallace Langham; Graham Ludlow; Alan Rachins
- Cinematography: Harvey Jenkins
- Edited by: Lee Harry
- Music by: Matthew McCauley
- Distributed by: The Cannon Group
- Release date: May 30, 1986
- Running time: 84 minutes
- Country: United States
- Language: English

Thunder Run is a 1986 American action-thriller film directed by Gary Hudson and starring Forrest Tucker and John Ireland. It was developed by special-effects expert Clifford Wenger Sr. and his wife, Carol Lynn. It was dedicated to their son, Clifford Wenger Jr., who also worked on the movie on special effects, while simultaneously working on Rambo: First Blood Part II, where he was killed in an explosion accident in 1984. During the 1980s the movie was frequently aired on cable channels such as Showtime and The Movie Channel where it developed a cult following. The film is notable for an action sequence in which an 18-wheeler jumps over a train.

== Plot ==
A Korean War veteran/aging trucker spends his retirement mining an old cobalt mine with the assistance of his devoted grandson. A good friend lures the trucker out of retirement by offering him a quarter of a million dollars to drive some plutonium from Nevada to a high-security operation in Arizona. He begins his trek in a high-tech rig unaware that domestic terrorists are waiting to ambush him and his deadly cargo.

== Cast ==
- Forrest Tucker as Charlie Morrison
- John Ireland as George Adams
- John Shepherd as Chris
- Jill Whitlow as Kim
- Wallace Langham as Paul
- Graham Ludlow as Mike
- Alan Rachins as Carlos
