= Ricky Dean Logan =

American actor and producer

- Occupation: Actor
- Years active: 1989–2010

Ricky Dean Logan is an American actor and producer who has been in movies and on television.

His film credits include Back to the Future Part II, Back to the Future Part III as a different character, Freddy's Dead: The Final Nightmare, Buffy the Vampire Slayer and the Ice Nine Kills mini series "Welcome To Horrorwood".

Logan has made guest appearances on television shows, including "Seinfeld".

== Selected filmography ==
- 1989 Back to the Future Part II as Rafe "Data" Unger
- 1990 Back to the Future Part III as Member of Needles' Gang
- 1990 Monday Morning as Reilly
- 1990 The Flash as Scott
- 1991 Guilty as Charged as Landon
- 1991 Freddy's Dead: The Final Nightmare as Carlos Rodriguez
- 1992 "Seinfeld" as The Freak
- 1992 Buffy the Vampire Slayer as Bloody Student
- 1994 The Fantastic Four as Busboy
- 1995 Joe's Rotten World as Bobby
- 1997 Dilbert's Desktop Games (Video Game) as Wally (voice)
- 1997 Psycho Sushi as Sean
- 1999 Dark Spiral as Joey
- 2000 More Dogs Than Bones as Morgue Attendant
- 2004 Y.M.I. as Rocco
- 2004 Straight-Jacket as Moron #1
- 2005 L.A. Dicks as Ricky Dean
- 2010 The Mentalist
