= Elvis and Anabelle =

- Promotional release poster
- Directed by: Will Geiger
- Screenplay by: Will Geiger
- Produced by: Carolyn Pfeiffer; Nick Quested; Gregory Collins; Tom Schatz
- Starring: Blake Lively; Max Minghella; Joe Mantegna; Mary Steenburgen; Keith Carradine
- Cinematography: Conrad W. Hall
- Edited by: Sandra Adair
- Music by: Blake Neely
- Production companies: Goldcrest Films; Burnt Orange Productions; Town Lake Films
- Distributed by: The Weinstein Company
- Release date: March 10, 2007 (SXSW)
- Running time: 105 minutes
- Country: United States
- Language: English

Elvis and Anabelle is an American romantic drama film written and directed by Will Geiger. It stars Blake Lively, Max Minghella, Joe Mantegna, Mary Steenburgen, and Keith Carradine. The film premiered on March 10, 2007, at the South by Southwest film and music festival in Austin, Texas, and later premiered on HBO in 2012.

== Plot ==
Teen Elvis Moreau cares for his father Charlie, who has been mentally handicapped for years, and operates their funeral home. However, as he doesn't have an embalming license, Charlie is officially the mortician. Elvis keeps photos of the finished corpses in a scrapbook.

Nearby, pageant girl Anabelle Leigh lives with her mother Geneva and alcoholic stepfather Jimmy. She has bulimia and Jimmy likely molests her. Geneva started her in beauty pageants very young, hoping for financial freedom from men.

Moments after qualifying for the nationals, Anabelle's heart stops on stage. Anabelle's body is sent to the Moreaus' Funeral Home. Elvis is beginning his work. Elvis kisses her, accidentally capturing it on camera. A gust of wind bursts open the window, as he shuts it, Anabelle suddenly gasps awake. Shocked, he calls the police and wakes Charlie, telling him he was working on Anabelle. She is returned home and is very changed, no longer with bulimia nor interested in pageants, but Geneva pressures her to continue.

Due to constant flashbacks to when she woke up, Anabelle goes to the Moreaus' to learn more. Elvis turns her away, fearing she will discover he does the embalming. That night, she sneaks back by bike, to try to relive that night. Elvis confronts her, thinking somebody broke in, and then Charlie enters. Elvis reminds him to say he was who worked on Anabelle. Walking her out, she asks to stay until dawn to bike home. She obviously does not want to go, so he lets her stay.

Anabelle and Elvis slowly become friends. She begins painting the house and he joins her. One morning, Elvis shows her the headline that she's missing. Annoyed, Annabelle insists Geneva knows she ran away. Elvis fears the police may find her there, but she doesn't.

When Anabelle notices the field next to the house is barren, Elvis says nothing can grow there. She insists they buy seeds, keeping it a secret, saying it's "a miracle". While Anabelle's in the field, the police come by, looking for her. She's unconcerned, as she's there willingly.

Anabelle and Elvis continue to bond. One night on a walk, they end up on the bridge where his mother committed suicide. After her death, Charlie started going on very long walks. On one of them, he was disabled by someone hitting him over the head with a bottle. Since then, Elvis doesn't believe in miracles. Anabelle kissing him triggers another flashback, so she pulls away.

The police return, so when Anabelle and Elvis arrive, Charlie is distraught. They know she was staying there, but he insisted she left. Anabelle decides to visit a far-off friend, so Elvis drives her after Charlie convinces him. When Elvis and Anabelle finally reach their destination, she confesses she made up having a friend there. Instead, they live on the beach for some weeks, and become intimate.

The police report to Geneva and Jimmy, but when she asks them to search the house they can't as Anabelle ran away and wasn't kidnapped. So she goes to the Moreaus herself to investigate. Finding Anabelle's clothes and the photo of Elvis kissing her in the mortuary trash, she calls the police.

On the drive home, Elvis and Anabelle stop at a gas station, and both see newspapers with photo and headlines accusing Elvis of necrophilia. Recognizing them, the cashier calls the police. Before Elvis can explain, he is arrested. Anabelle is returned to Geneva and Jimmy. In jail, Elvis tells the police the truth. A few days later, she visits him there. They argue and Elvis tells her what really happened. Shocked, not understanding how he still doesn't believe in miracles, she leaves.

Returning home, Elvis finds Charlie dead outside. Despondent, he decides to hang himself. Just before, a gust of wind blows the windows open, showing him Anabelle's miraculous sunflower field. He barely saves himself, then runs outside to many reporters. Meanwhile, Anabelle is also preparing her suicide. Nudging a running TV towards her bath, right before she can electrocute herself, she sees Elvis painting "I Love You Anabelle" on his house.

Elvis lies down in the sunflower field, to look up at the flowers and sky, and Anabelle soon joins him.

== Cast ==
- Max Minghella as Elvis Moreau
- Blake Lively as Anabelle Leigh
- Joe Mantegna as Charlie Moreau
- Mary Steenburgen as Geneva Leigh
- Keith Carradine as Jimmy

== Critical reception ==
A reviewer writing for Movieline praised the performances of Lively and Minghella, and called the film "a dark and dreamy slice of Southern gothic romance, having all the hallmarks of a cult film in the making, destined for Gen-Z status."
