= Through the Glass Darkly (film) =

- Film poster
- Directed by: Lauren Fash
- Written by: Lauren Fash; Susan Graham
- Produced by: Lauren Fash; Autumn Bailey; Carmella Casinelli; Susan Graham
- Starring: Robyn Lively; Shanola Hampton
- Cinematography: Damian Horan
- Edited by: Lisa Zeno Churgin; Adriaan van Zyl
- Music by: Stephen Webster
- Production company: Blue Fox Entertainment
- Release date: September 19, 2020 (Frameline Film Festival)
- Running time: 103 minutes
- Country: United States
- Language: English

Through the Glass Darkly is a 2020 American thriller film written and directed by Lauren Fash. The film premiered at the Frameline Film Festival on September 19, 2020.

== Plot ==
Elrod, Georgia. A lesbian couple becomes the prime suspects after their own daughter, Lily, goes missing. A year has passed since, and with no results in sight, Charlie and Angela decide to find her on their own. Meanwhile, another girl, Elodie Carmichael, goes missing in the same city as well. The police and neighbors assume that Charlie is the culprit behind the disappearances, however, she is determined to find the perpetrator who kidnapped her daughter even if it will cost her revealing her dark past.

== Cast ==
- Robyn Lively as Charlie
- Michael Trucco as Trip Carmichael
- Alicia Davis Johnson as Sylvia Carmichael
- Bethany Anne Lind as Angela
- Shanola Hampton as Amy
- Judith Ivey as Mama Carmichael
- Cece Kelly as Elodie Carmichael
- Kerry Cahill as Cricket
- Katrina Norman as Kayla
- Nicholas Logan as Bo
- Cece King as Belinda Jones
- Vince Foster as Braden
- Kinsley Isla Dillon as Lily
- Zoe Myers as waitress
- Joy Jacobson as Mary Ann Childers
- Dustan Costine as bouncer
- Erica Bardin as reporter #1
- Heather McKinley as reporter #2
- John Paul Marston as reporter #3
- Sam Juergens as cameraman
- Susan Graham as Magnolia
- Andrew Masset as Dr. Wright
- Stan Houston as Sheriff Walker
- Sandra E. Williams as bar extra
- Kristi Taylor as Rosalie
- Caleb McCoy as Duke
- Hamilton Sage as Troy
- David Lowe as strip club patron
- Monica Mathis as trailer park hooker
- Jeff Ailshie as male customer

== Reception ==
Josiah Teal of Film Threat called it "a thriller for the #MeToo era".

Frank Scheck of The Hollywood Reporter wrote "Robyn Lively's affecting performance anchors this offbeat Southern Gothic thriller".
