= Dead Space (film) =

- VHS cover
- Directed by: Fred Gallo
- Written by: Catherine Cyran
- Produced by: Mike Elliott
- Starring: Marc Singer; Laura Tate; Judith Chapman; Bryan Cranston; Randy Reinholz; Lori Lively
- Cinematography: Mark Parry
- Edited by: Lawrence Jordan
- Music by: Daniel May
- Production company: Concorde Pictures
- Distributed by: Califilm (US)
- Release date: January 21, 1991
- Running time: 72 minutes
- Country: United States
- Language: English

Dead Space is a 1991 American science-fiction horror film directed by Fred Gallo and produced by Mike Elliott for Roger Corman's Concorde Pictures. It was a remake of Corman's Forbidden World (1982). According to writer Chris Koetting, "The plot was essentially the same— although this time the scientists were trying to find a cure for an AIDS-type virus— but the sex and gore quotient was substantially reduced, and the monster was even less convincing than the one that was fabricated by Steve Neill in 1982."

== Plot ==
In the research facility on the planet Phablos, a virus is created in a botched experiment which turns those infected into monsters. An emergency distress call is sent from the lab. A spacecraft crewed by Commander Steve Krieger and robot sidekick Tinpan respond to the emergency call from the planet, but their craft is attacked and damaged on the way to Phablos.

Upon their arrival at Phablos, those in charge of the laboratory explain that they have managed to contain the virus. Krieger accepts the lab's claims and begins repairs on his ship. The scientist had not been entirely honest with Krieger, and had been attempting to study the virus rather than contain it.

The virus escapes and infects a nearby survivor, leaving the laboratory to face a killer virus that uses human bodies to spawn alien monster offspring.

Krieger and Tinpan attempt to stop the monster, but their weapons prove ineffective. One of the lab workers develops a bioweapon that proves effective in stopping the monster.

== Cast ==
- Marc Singer as Commander Steve Krieger
- Laura Tate as Dr. Marissa Salinger
- Bryan Cranston as Dr. Frank Darden
- Judith Chapman as Dr. Emily Stote
- Randy Reinholz as Tim
- Frank Roman as Sal Dickens
- Lori Lively as Jill Tollman
- Greg Blanchard as Joe
- Rodger Halston as "Tinpan" (credited as Rodger Hall)
- Liz Rogers as Devon Latham

== Production ==
The movie is a remake of the 1982, Roger Corman-produced horror film Forbidden World and while there are minor differences, it still retains the original main storyline and character set-up. Singer said that he had fun shooting the movie, and felt that it was an "unpretentious, rip-roaring space adventure."

The film had a working title of Biohazard. Like the original, some of the space battle effects were reused from Battle Beyond the Stars.

The effects team wanted a monster different from anything that had been seen before, a task made more complicated as the movie was shot in three weeks. An inner harness was developed which allowed for rapid mobility of the actor in the monster suit. GM foam and hair inserts were used to show the transformation of human into monster.

== Reception ==
TV Guide found the movie a weak entry into the man versus monster genre. It felt it borrowed heavily from Alien and Star Wars and had many plot holes. While Gorezone liked the technical aspects of the monster effect, it preferred the original Forbidden World to this remake. It also stated that the monster seemed more of a mutant dinosaur than mutated human.

IGN found the movie to be a typical Corman movie, but that the movie was notable for Bryan Cranston in one of his earliest roles.

Rue Morgue wrote "Marginally slicker than its inspiration but nowhere near as much fun (i.e. less female nudity), Dead Space feels much longer than its 72 minute running time."

== Home release ==
In 2010, Shout! Factory released the film on DVD, packaged as a double feature with The Terror Within as part of the Roger Corman's Cult Classics collection. The film is in fullscreen aspect ratio. IGN called the transfer "[...] incredibly faded and murky, with dust and dirt present throughout, and even some annoying digital artifacting."

As of January 2022, the movie is available to stream for free on many sites, including Tubi, Plex Inc. and the Shout streaming app
