= Robyn Lively =

American actress (born 1972)

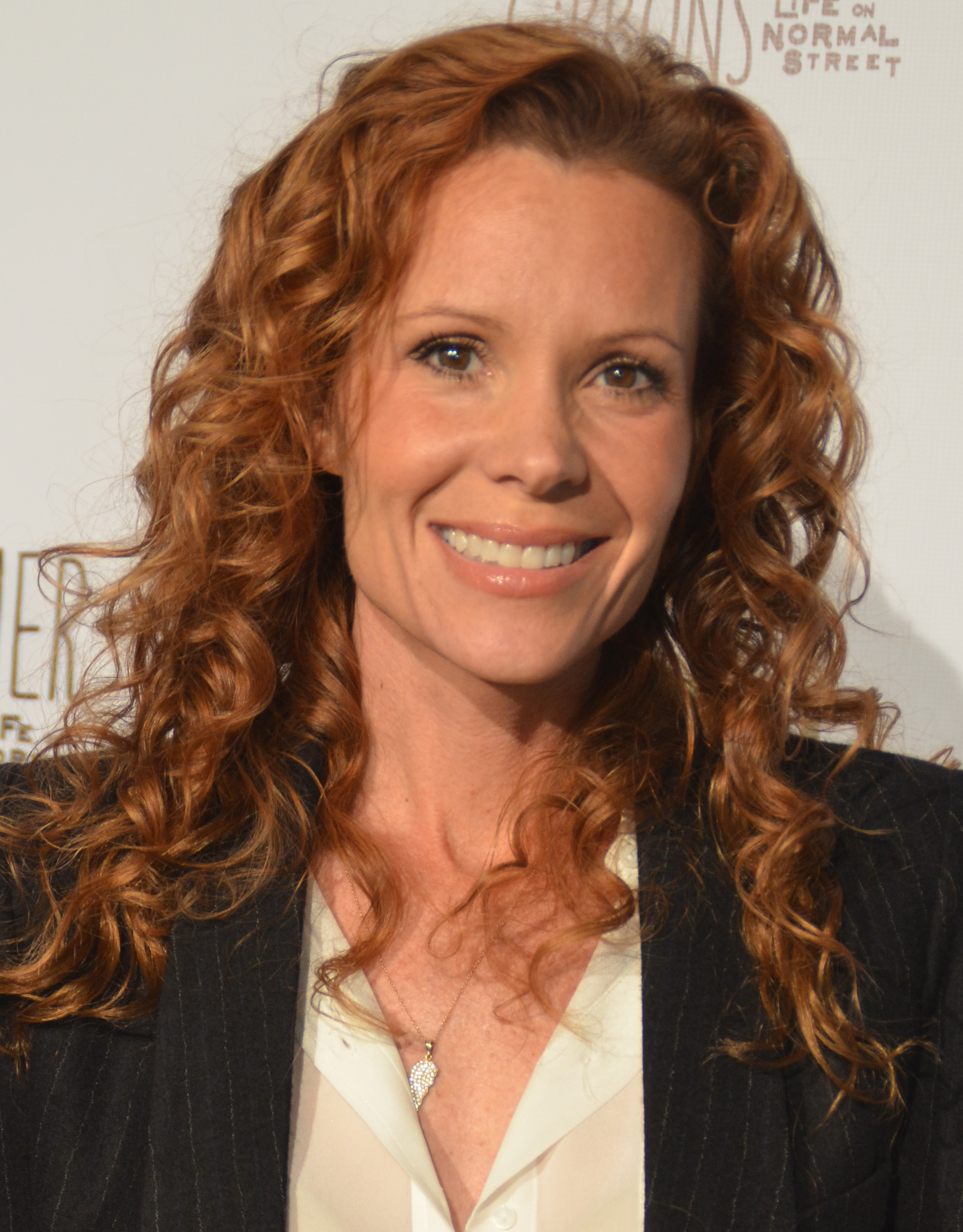
- Lively in 2014
- Born: Robyn Elaine Lively; February 7, 1972 (age 54); Powder Springs, Georgia, U.S.
- Occupation: Actress
- Years active: 1978–present
- Height: 173 cm (5 ft 8 in)
- Spouse: Bart Johnson (m. 1999)
- Children: 3
- Father: Ernie Lively (step-father)
- Relatives: Jason Lively (brother); Lori Lively (sister); Eric Lively (half-brother); Blake Lively (half-sister); Ryan Reynolds (brother-in-law)

Robyn Elaine Lively Johnson (born February 7, 1972) is an American actress. She is known for her roles in the 1989 films Teen Witch and The Karate Kid Part III, as well as the TV shows Doogie Howser, M.D., Twin Peaks, Savannah, and Saving Grace.

== Early life ==
Robyn Elaine Lively was born on February 7, 1972, to talent manager Elaine Lively (née McAlpin) and her first husband Ronald Otis Lively. .

Following her divorce from Ronald, Elaine married acting coach Ernie Lively (né Brown) in 1979. Robyn was later adopted by Ernie, who is the father of her younger half siblings, Eric and Blake Lively.

== Career ==
Lively began her career as a child actress: at age six, she made her screen debut in the television movie Summer of My German Soldier in 1978. Throughout the 1980s, Lively appeared in several television shows including Silver Spoons, Punky Brewster and Starman. She appeared in the feature films Wildcats, The Karate Kid Part III, Teen Witch, and Not Quite Human.

After being cast as Jessica Andrews in The Karate Kid Part III in 1989, producers were forced to modify Lively's role of protagonist Daniel LaRusso's new love interest because she was only 16 at the time of filming and still a minor while Ralph Macchio was 27 (although his character Daniel is 17). This situation caused romantic scenes between Jessica and Daniel to be rewritten so that the pair only developed a close friendship. In 2022, Lively reprised her role as Jessica Andrews in the fifth season of Cobra Kai, where it is revealed that Daniel is married to her cousin, Amanda.

At age 19, Lively was nominated for a Daytime Emmy Award for her performance as an insecure teen in the 1991 ABC Afterschool Special episode "Less Than Perfect Daughter". In the 1990s, Lively had recurring roles on Twin Peaks, Doogie Howser, M.D., and Chicago Hope. In 1996, she appeared as Lane McKenzie, one of three lead characters in the short-lived WB drama Savannah.

In 2003, Lively played NCIS Special Agent Vivian Blackadder in the JAG episodes "Ice Queen" and "Meltdown" (the backdoor pilot for NCIS). Five years later, Lively appeared alongside Holly Hunter in an episode of Saving Grace and also had a role in Cold Case. In 2010, she appeared alongside Twin Peaks costars in the Dual Spires episode of Psych and starred in the TV series Gortimer Gibbon's Life on Normal Street for Amazon Studios as Gortimer Gibbon's mother, Claire.

In 2020, Lively starred in the thriller Through the Glass Darkly which premiered at the Frameline Film Festival on September 19, 2020. She appeared in the 2024 romantic drama film, It Ends with Us as Ms. Byland. The film starred and was produced by her sister, Blake.

== Personal life ==
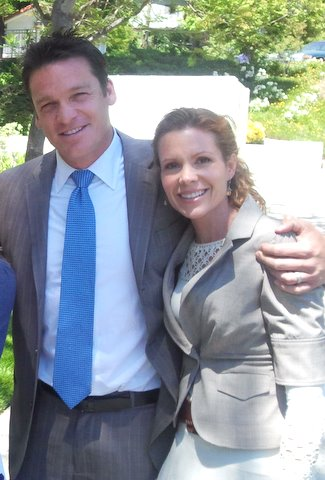
Lively and her husband in 2011

Lively married fellow actor Bart Johnson on September 25, 1999.

== Filmography ==
=== Film ===
Year	Title	Role	Notes
1986	The Best of Times	Jaki	
1986	Wildcats	Alice Needham	
1988	Buckeye and Blue	Buckeye Thatcher	
1989	The Karate Kid Part III	Jessica Andrews	
1989	Teen Witch	Louise Miller	
1995	Dream a Little Dream 2	Rachel Holfield	
2006	Simon Says	Leanne	
2007	7-10 Split	Diane Burke	
2007	A Dance for Bethany	Abbey	
2008	The Adventures of Young Indiana Jones: Winds of Change	Nancy Stratemeyer	Uncredited
2008	Murder.Com	Lauren	
2010	Letters to God	Maddy Doherty	
2011	Sironia	Barbara	
2011	Brother's Keeper	Macaire Leemaster	
2014	Ouija	Mrs. Galardi	
2015	Chasing Ghosts	Lydia Simmons	
2017	Small Town Crime	Deborah Nevile	
2020	Through the Glass Darkly	Charlie	
2023	National Anthem	Fiona	
2023	Best Clowns	Donna	
2024	Someone Like You	Dr. Jenny Allen	
2024	Ganymede	Floy Fletcher	
2024	It Ends with Us	Ms. Byland	

=== Television ===
Year	Title	Role	Notes
1978	Summer of My German Soldier	Sharon Bergen	TV movie
1983	Boone	Amanda	Episode: "Words and Music"
1984	Knight Rider	Becky Phillips	Episode: "Race for Life"
1984	Punky Brewster	Lisa	Episodes: "Punky Finds a Home: Part 2", "… Part 3"
1985	The New Leave It to Beaver	Tracy	2 episodes
1986	Fuzzbucket	Stevie Gerber	TV movie
1986	Silver Spoons	Tammy	Episode: "The Beach House"
1986	Starman	Beth McGovern	Episode: "Like Father, Like Son"
1986	Amazing Stories	Kate	Episode: "Welcome to My Nightmare"
1987	Not Quite Human	Becky Carson	TV movie
1988	The Dictator	Reggie Domino	Episode: "1.1"
1989	21 Jump Street	Helen Ackerly	Episode: "Mike's P.O.V."
1989	Not Quite Human II	Becky Carson	TV movie
1990	Teen Angel Returns	Cindy	Main cast (as Robyn Elaine Lively)
1990	Parker Lewis Can't Lose	Tracy Lee Summers	Episode: "G.A.G. Dance"
1990–91	Twin Peaks	Lana Budding Milford	Recurring role (season 2)
1991	ABC Afterschool Special	Melissa Harmon	Episode: "The Less Than Perfect Daughter"
1991	Crazy from the Heart	Franny Peyton	TV movie
1991–93	Doogie Howser, M.D.	Nurse Michele Farber	Recurring role (seasons 2, 4)
1992	In Sickness and in Health	Holly	TV movie
1992	Freshman Dorm	Molly Flynn	Main cast
1993	Quantum Leap	Annie Wilkins	Episode: "Dr. Ruth"
1993	The Young Indiana Jones Chronicles	Nancy Stratemeyer	Episode: "Princeton, February 1916"
1993	Precious Victims	Wendy McBride	TV movie
1993	Against the Grain	Jill Clemons	Recurring role
1994–95	Chicago Hope	Nurse Maggie Atkisson	8 episodes
1996	The Adventures of Young Indiana Jones: Travels with Father	Nancy Stratemeyer	TV movie
1996–97	Savannah	Lane McKenzie Collins	Main cast
1997	Early Edition	Jenny Sloane	Episode: "Jenny Sloane"
1997–98	George and Leo	Casey Wagonman #2	Main cast replacement
1998	Love Boat: The Next Wave	Penelope Michaels	Episode: "How Long Has This Been Going On?"
1999	The Adventures of Young Indiana Jones: Spring Break Adventure	Nancy Stratemeyer	TV movie (episode ""Princeton, February 1916" with new connecting segment)
1999	The X-Files	Angela Schiff	Episode: "Field Trip"
1999	Sam Churchill: Search for a Homeless Man	Laura Anders	TV movie
2000	Chicken Soup for the Soul	Sophie Calloway	Episode: "Thinking of You/Mama's Soup Pot/The Letter"
2000	Santa Who?	Claire Dreyer	TV movie
2002	The District	Jodi	Episode: "The Greenhouse Effect"
2002	Another Pretty Face	Andrea 'Andie' Chase	TV movie
2003	Crossing Jordan	Connie	Episode: "Pandora's Trunk: Part 1"
2003	JAG	NCIS Special Agent Vivian Blackadder	2-part episode: "Ice Queen" / "Meltdown"
2003	The Drew Carey Show	Erin	Episode: "A Speedy Recovery"
2003	American Dreams	Sister Grace	2 episodes
2004	Strong Medicine	Connie	Episode: "Positive Results"
2005	Mystery Woman: Snapshot	Madeline	TV movie
2005	CSI: NY	Sarah Myers	Episode: "Manhattan Manhunt"
2006	Nip/Tuck	Miss Hudson	Episode: "Willy Ward"
2007	Johnny Kapahala: Back on Board	Carla	TV movie
2007	Cold Case	Miriam Gunden	Episode: "Running Around"
2007	Saving Grace	Darlene Dewey	Episode: "And You Wonder Why I Lie"
2008	Criminal Minds	Abby Corbin	Episode: "Paradise"
2008	30 Rock	Kelsey Winthrop	Episode: "Reunion"
2008	Saving Grace	Darlene Dewey	2 episodes
2009	Alligator Point	Gina	TV movie
2010	The Mentalist	Sadie Harrington	Episode: "Red All Over"
2010	Psych	Michelle Barker	Episode: "Dual Spires"
2011	Who Is Simon Miller?	Meredith Miller	TV movie
2012	Longmire	Connie Mallery	Episode: "A Good Death is Hard to Find"
2013	It's Always Sunny in Philadelphia	Kerry	Episode: "Gun Fever Too: Still Hot"
2014	Gortimer Gibbon's Life on Normal Street	Claire Gibbon	Main cast
2018	Hawaii Five-0	Helen Meech	Episode: "O na hoku o ka lani wale no kai 'ike i kahi o Pae"
2018	Code Black	Pamela Kessler	Episode: "Home Stays Home"
2019	The Good Doctor	Diane Monroe	Episode: "Risk and Reward”
2019	Dwight in Shining Armor	Lady Ermingarde	Episode: "Dragon"
2019	Into the Dark	Val	Episode: "They Come Knocking"
2019	The Affair	Lauren	Episode: #5.2
2019	Light as a Feather	Deb Brady	Recurring role (season 2)
2020	The Rookie	Mrs. Dayton	Episode: "Now and Then"
2020	All Rise	Nancy Frost	2 episodes
2022–2025	9-1-1: Lone Star	Marlene Harris	Recurring role (season 3-5)
2022	Cobra Kai	Jessica Andrews	Episode: "Extreme Measures"
2024	Lioness	Senator Albright	2 episodes
2024–present	Landman	Ellie	5 episodes
2025	High Potential	Lorraine Sternblatt	Episode: "Chasing Ghosts"
2025	NCIS: Origins	Maxine Randolf	Episode: "Happy Birthday"

=== Video games ===
Year	Title	Role
1993	Return to Zork	Fairy

== Award nominations ==
Year	Award	Category	Nominated work	Result
1984	Young Artist Award	Best Young Actress in a New Television Series	Boone	Nominated
1985	Young Artist Award	Best Young Actress - Guest in a Television Series	Knight Rider	Nominated
1987	Young Artist Award	Exceptional Performance by a Young Actress Starring in a Feature Film - Comedy or Drama	Wildcats	Nominated
1989	Young Artist Award	Best Young Actress Starring in a Motion Picture	Teen Witch	Nominated
1991	Daytime Emmy Awards	Outstanding Performer in a Children's Special	ABC Afterschool Special (Episode: "The Less Than Perfect Daughter")	Nominated
