= JoBlo.com =

Film review website

The Joblo Movie Network
- Website type: Film review
- Available in: English
- Owner: Berge Garabedian
- Creator: Berge Garabedian
- Website: Official website
- Launched: 1998; 28 years ago
- Current status: Active

JoBlo.com is an anchor website of the JoBlo Movie Network focused on news, film reviews, and film trailers. The network has YouTube channels that focus on trailers, movie clips, celebrity interviews, original content, and film distribution.

== History ==
In 1998, Montreal native Berge "JoBlo" Garabedian founded JoBlo.com. Garabedian is a writer and producer of Armenian descent. His film reviews generally critiqued movies from the perspective of an average movie-goer. The site eventually hired other critics to write reviews. Garabedian wrote more than 1,400 reviews as the site's main critic, until health problems forced him to withdraw in 2007. The website's name is a play on "Joe Blow," and registered users of the website are known as "schmoes." The site also features news about movies, movie trailers, movie previews, and celebrity interviews.

In 2001, the site started holding an annual awards presentation for films chosen by the site's visitors that became known as "The Golden Schmoes."

In 2007, Garabedian was invited to take part in the "Masters of the Web" panel at the SDCC alongside other popular movie fan sites such as ComingSoon.net, Dark Horizons, CHUD, Ain't It Cool News, and Collider.

In February 2009, JoBlo.com started a weekly podcast called The Good, The Bad, and The JoBlo Movie Podcast. Podcast guests have included Bobcat Goldthwait, Duncan Jones, and Clifton Collins, Jr.

In 2009, JoBlo.com launched the movie community section called MovieFanCentral. The community was shut down in early 2018.

In 2010, Garabedian was interviewed for the documentary film, The People vs George Lucas. That year, he created JoBlo Movie Productions to executive-produce several of his own films, including 2015's The Shelter and two documentaries, Arcade Dreams and 1982: Greatest Geek Year Ever.

In 2019, JoBlo.com's Editor-in-Chief Chris Bumbray began doing weekly movie reviews on the CTV NEWS channel.

== Reception ==
In 2006, Entertainment Weekly called JoBlo one of its 25 favorite online entertainment sites. In 2007, Time magazine called Garabedian one of the "new tastemakers" in Hollywood. In 2001, USA Today called JoBlo.com one of the "Web's hottest fansites." In 2004, Variety said that "Websites like JoBlo.com and Ain't-It-Cool-News, which were once 'renegades', are now courted heavily by publicists" and that JoBlo was considered an "E-frathouse; strident in its opinions but less reliant on the rumor mill". Maclean’s September 29, 2014, issue called JoBlo one of the "YouTube stars" who was "making the most of it."

Writer/director Kevin Smith wrote the foreword to Garabedian's 2002 book, JoBlo.com presents the 50 Coolest Movies of All-Time, in which Smith compared the film critic to a "good blowjob."

== YouTube Channels ==
By 2011, JoBlo.com expanded its operations to the YouTube platform with its first channel entitled ‘JoBlo Movie Trailers’.

By 2015, it had expanded its JoBlo YouTube Network to include four more channels including ‘JoBlo Movie Clips’, ‘JoBlo TV Trailers’, and ‘JoBlo Horror Trailers’.

By 2018, the network had started to create its own original movie content for the YouTube platform by establishing ‘JoBlo Originals’, ‘JoBlo Celebrity Interviews’, and ‘JoBlo Horror Originals’ as their own stand-alone channels.

By 2024, the JoBlo YouTube Network now featured 12 total channels, including the latest additions ‘JoBlo Superheroes’, ‘JoBlo Animated Videos’, ‘JoBlo Upcoming Movies’, ‘JoBlo Behind-the-Scenes and Bloopers’ as well as its first non-English channel called ‘JoBlo En Espanol’.

By the end of 2024 JoBlo had surpassed 17 million subscribers across all of their channels.

== See also ==
- AICN
- Dark Horizons
- /Film (Slashfilm)
- The Movie Insider
- Box Office Mojo
- Fandango Media
