= Bethany Anne Lind =

American actress (born 1985)

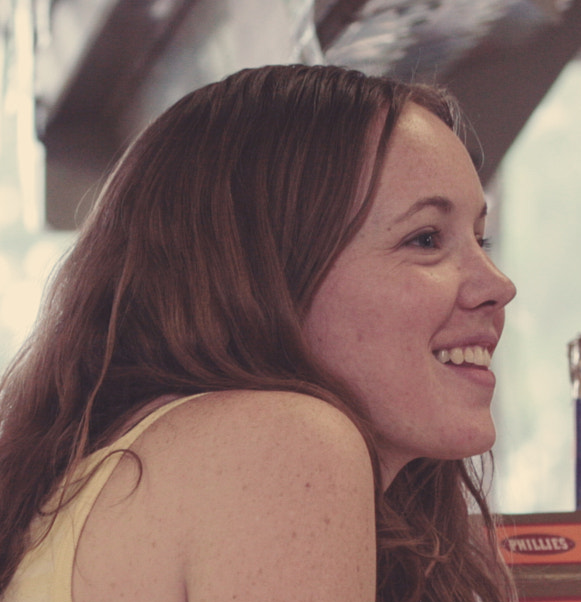
- Lind in 2009, filming Carl
- Born: June 28, 1985 (age 41); New York City, New York, U.S.
- Occupation: Actress
- Years active: 2009–present

Bethany Anne Lind (born June 28, 1985) is an American stage and screen actress best known for playing Grace Young in the Netflix series Ozark, Molly Quinn in the Hulu series Reprisal and Leigh Tiller in Blood on Her Name. She had a recurring role as Clara Steele in the Max series Doom Patrol.

== Career ==
On stage, she played Margo in Carapace and Olivia in 26 Miles, both at Alliance Theater, and Dora in The Storytelling Ability of a Boy at Florida Stage. In May 2009, her musical theater performance on opening night in Junie B. Jones and a Little Monkey Business was called "a treat to watch" by the Atlanta Journal-Constitution.

On screen, she played Quinn Shinn in the television film Mean Girls 2, was the romantic lead in the film Crackerjack produced by Jeff Foxworthy, and played the lead role of Leigh Tiller in the film Blood on Her Name.

== Filmography ==
=== Film ===
Year	Title	Role	Notes
2012	Carl	Judy	
2012	Flight	Vicky Evans	
2013	Crackerjack	Sherry Partridge	
2013	Four Senses	Bethany	
2018	One Last Thing	Mother	
2019	Blood on Her Name	Leigh Tiller	
2019	Doctor Sleep	Violet's Mother	
2020	Second Samuel	Jimmy DeeAnne Jones	
2020	Through the Glass Darkly	Angela	
2021	Chaos Walking	Karyssa Hewitt	
2024	Lilly	Vickie Ledbetter	
2026	Joe's College Road Trip	Vikki	
2026	Blank Slate	Amber	Short film

=== Television ===
Year	Title	Role	Notes
2010	Drop Dead Diva	Assistant	Episode: "Back from the Dead"
2011	Mean Girls 2	Quinn Shinn	Television film
2012	Army Wives	Gina	Episode: "True Colors"
2014	Rectify	Kate Everett	Episode: "Sleeping Giants"
2015	The Game	Cydney	Episodes: "The Saber's Story", "Switch!"
2015	The Walking Dead	Young Woman	Episode: "Here's Not Here"
2016	Turn: Washington's Spies	Betsy Shippen	3 episodes
2016	Stranger Things	Sandra	Episode: "Chapter Two: The Weirdo on Maple Street"
2017	Ozark	Grace Young	5 episodes
2017	Lore	Sarah Nicholson Phelps	Episode: "Passing Notes"
2018	Greenleaf	Coralie Hunter	4 episodes
2019–2023	Doom Patrol	Clara Steele	16 episodes
2019	Reprisal	Molly	10 episodes
