= Eric Lively =

American actor (born 1981)

- Born: Eric Lawrence Brown; July 31, 1981 (age 44); Atlanta, Georgia, U.S.
- Occupation: Actor
- Years active: 1983–2014
- Spouse: Angelina Davydova (m. 2005)
- Father: Ernie Lively
- Relatives: Blake Lively (sister); Ryan Reynolds (brother-in-law); Lori Lively (sister); Robyn Lively (sister); Bart Johnson (brother-in-law); Jason Lively (brother)

Eric Lawrence Brown (born July 31, 1981), known professionally as Eric Lively, is an American former actor. He played the role of Andy Evans in Speak (2004), Carey Bell in So Weird (1999–2001), and Mark Wayland in The L Word (2005).

== Early life ==
Eric Lawrence Lively was born in Atlanta, Georgia. He has a sister, actress Blake Lively, half-sisters Lori and Robyn Lively, and a half-brother, Jason Lively, who played Rusty in National Lampoon's European Vacation. He is the son of talent manager Elaine Lively (née McAlpin) and actor Ernie Lively (né Brown). All four of his siblings have been in the entertainment industry.

== Career ==
Lively's first film was as a baby in the 1983 film Brainstorm. After graduating from high school, Lively moved to New York City to study photography, his first passion. He studied photography at Parsons The New School for Design in New York City. At one time, he was an Abercrombie and Fitch model.

He guest starred on an episode of Full House at age 13, where he played Stephanie Tanner's first boyfriend. He had a role in American Pie (1999). He followed this up on the television series So Weird, on which he played Carey Bell from 2000 to 2001. He learned to play the guitar for his character on So Weird. Lively then became a cast member of the short-lived 2003 Norm Macdonald series A Minute With Stan Hooper. In 2004 he acted in Speak with Kristen Stewart. In 2005, Lively was offered two different television roles – on 24 and The L Word. He took the role on The L Word as documentary filmmaker Mark Wayland. He chose a recurring role on The L Word over a regular role on 24 because he felt the subject matter was more important. He was part of the cast of the WB series Modern Men from March until May 2006. He was the main character in The Butterfly Effect 2 in 2006.

Lively played the president's son, Roger Taylor, in 24: Redemption, a television film prequel to the seventh season of 24.

He appeared as Pink's on-screen boyfriend in her music video "Please Don't Leave Me" in 2009, with stuntman Justin Sundquist serving as his stunt double. In 2012, he guest starred in the Lifetime series The Client List. In 2013, Lively played in A Madea Christmas as Conner.

== Filmography ==
Film
| Year | Title | Role | Notes |
|---|---|---|---|
| 1983 | Brainstorm | Baby | Uncredited |
| 1994 | Armed and Innocent | Sammy | Television film |
| 1998 | Sandman | Bobby Doll | |
| 1999 | American Pie | Albert | |
| 2001 | A Mother's Fight for Justice | Andrew Stone | Television film |
| 2001 | Uprising | Arie Wilner | Television film |
| 2002 | The Pact | Christopher Harte | Television film |
| 2004 | Speak | Andy Evans | |
| 2006 | The Breed | Matt | |
| 2006 | The Butterfly Effect 2 | Nicholas "Nick" Larson | Direct-to-video |
| 2007 | Live! | Brad | |
| 2007 | Sex and Breakfast | Charlie | |
| 2008 | Deep Winter | Tyler Crowe | |
| 2008 | 24: Redemption | Roger Taylor | Television film |
| 2013 | A Madea Christmas | Conner | |
| 2014 | BFFs | Tom | |

Television
| Year | Title | Role | Notes |
|---|---|---|---|
| 1994 | Full House | Jamie | Episode: "Is It True About Stephanie?" |
| 1999–2001 | So Weird | Carey Bell | Main cast (seasons 2–3); 48 episodes |
| 2003–2004 | A Minute with Stan Hooper | Ryan Hawkins | Main cast; 13 episodes |
| 2005 | The L Word | Mark Wayland | Main cast (season 2); 10 episodes |
| 2006 | Modern Men | Doug Reynolds | Main cast; 7 episodes |
| 2007 | The Nine | Paul | Episode: "Man of the Year" |
| 2009 | 24 | Roger Taylor | Uncredited; episode: "Day 7: 7:00 a.m. – 8:00 a.m." |
| 2010 | Covert Affairs | Conrad Sheehan III | Episode: "Pilot" |
| 2012 | The Client List | Derek West | Episode: "Games People Play" |

Music videos
| Year | Title | Artist |
|---|---|---|
| 1999 | "Walk Me Home" | Mandy Moore |
| 2008 | "Please Don't Leave Me" | Pink |
