= Starquest II =

Starquest II aka Galactic Odyssey
- Directed by: Fred Gallo
- Written by: Fred Gallo
- Produced by: Darin Spillman
- Starring: Adam Baldwin; Robert Englund; Duane Davis
- Music by: Ed Tomney
- Release date: 1997
- Country: United States
- Language: English

Starquest II is a 1997 science fiction thriller film written and directed by Fred Gallo.

== Premise ==
After a nuclear war, four warriors from Earth awaken on a space ship. They must save the Earth from being taken over by extraterrestrials who will do anything to save their race.

== Cast ==
- Adam Baldwin as Lee
- Robert Englund as Father O'Neill
- Duane Davis as Corporal Charles Devon
- Kate Rodger as Susan
- Gretchen Palmer as Carrie
- Jeannie Millar as Jenna
- Jolie Jackunas as Corporal Kelly
- Jerry Trimble as Trit
- Maria Ford as Dancer In Flashback
- Shauna O'Brien as Dancer In Flashback
