= Jill Whitlow =

American actress

- Born: November 11, 1963 (age 62)
- Years active: 1981-1992

Jill Whitlow (born November 11, 1963) is an American film and television actress who achieved her greatest recognition during the 1980s. She is best remembered by American audiences for her role as Cynthia Cronenberg in the 1986 cult horror film Night of the Creeps. She also starred in the action film Thunder Run, which was released in 1986. And she had small roles in Porky's (1981), Mask (1985), and Weird Science (1985). She appeared on a 1984 episode of T.J. Hooker called "The Two Faces of Betsy Morgan". She also starred in the horror films Hollywood-Monster and Twice Dead.

Whitlow appeared in the music video "Hungry" (1988) by rock band Winger.

== Filmography ==
Year	Title	Role	Notes
1981	Porky's	Mindy	
1985	Otherworld	Girl	Episode: "I Am Woman, Hear Me Roar"
1985	Mask	Anne Marie	
1985	Weird Science	Perfume Salesgirl	
1986	Thunder Run	Kim	
1986	Night of the Creeps	Cynthia	
1987	Hollywood-Monster	Laurie Sanders	
1988	Neat and Tidy: Adventures Beyond Belief	Tena Tidy	5 episodes
1988	Twice Dead	Robin Cates / Myrna	
1988	Freddy's Nightmares	Barbara Gamble	Episode: "Mother's Day"
1992	Swamp Thing	Dana Mirador	Episode: "Mirador's Brain"
2020	Naked Cannibal Campers	Jen	

TJ Hooker episode The two faces of Betsy Morgan 1984 |
