= The Christmas Spirit (film) =

Television film produced by and starring Nicollette Sheridan

- Genre: Romantic comedy
- Teleplay by: Jack Angelo
- Story by: Jack Angelo; Nicollette Sheridan
- Directed by: Jack Angelo
- Starring: Nicollette Sheridan; Bart Johnson; Amanda Foreman; Sammi Hanratty; Tristan Leabu; Olympia Dukakis
- Music by: Billy Lincoln
- Country of origin: United States
- Original language: English

Production
- Executive producers: Nicollette Sheridan; Jimmy Townsend; Eric Jarboe; Brad Krevoy; Francisco J. Gonzalez; Alexandre Coscas
- Producer: Brad Southwick
- Cinematography: Mark Irwin CSC/ASC
- Editor: Adam Lichtenstein
- Running time: 85 minutes
- Production companies: Brad Krevoy Television; Wyke Lane North Productions

Original release
- Network: Hallmark Channel
- Release: December 1, 2013

The Christmas Spirit is a 2013 American made-for-television Christmas-themed romantic comedy film starring Nicollette Sheridan and Bart Johnson. The film was directed by Jack Angelo, written by Angelo and Sheridan, and executive-produced by Sheridan, Jimmy Townsend, Eric Jarboe, Brad Krevoy, Francisco J. Gonzalez, and Alexandre Coscas. The film premiered on Hallmark Channel on December 1, 2013.

== Cast ==
- Nicollette Sheridan as Charlotte Hart
  - Jillian Schuld-Cole as Charlotte Stunt Double
- Bart Johnson as Daniel Huntslar
- Amanda Foreman as Pam
- Sammi Hanratty as Morgan
- Tristan Leabu as Christopher
- Olympia Dukakis as Gwen Hollander
- Oliver Sheridan as Oliver the Dog

== Production ==
The Christmas Spirit is based on an idea from Nicollette Sheridan, who executive-produced and starred in the film. Written and directed by Jack Angelo, the plot is similar to It's a Wonderful Life but set in the present day. The film is one of four holiday-themed movies produced for Hallmark Channel in 2013 by Brad Krevoy Television, who serves as an executive producer on all four movies along with Eric Jarboe, Francisco Gonzalez, and Alexandre Coscas. Sheridan's character, Charlotte Hart, was meant to recur in a series of future franchise movies for Hallmark.

Filming took place in Lebanon, Ohio, due to the tax incentives. The production employed about 90 local residents, including Sonya Staffan, the owner of a downtown shop called Jam and Jelly Lady, who was cast to play the owner of her own store. Staffan landed the role over three other actresses who auditioned for the part.

== Release ==
On December 1, 2013, The Christmas Spirit premiered on Hallmark Channel and was watched by 3.37 million viewers.

== Reception ==
In 2024, The Christmas Spirit was listed in the "20 festive Hallmark Christmas movies" by Entertainment Weekly.
