= Fred Gallo =

American director, producer and writer (born 1965)

Fred Gallo (born January 12, 1965) is an American director, producer and writer.

== Early life ==
Gallo attended University of Southern California, receiving a Bachelor of Arts in 1987 and a Master of Arts in 1990.

== Films directed ==
- Writer's Block (1990)
- Dead Space (1991)
- The Finishing Touch (1992)
- Dracula Rising (1993)
- Lady in Waiting (1994)
- Starquest II (1996)
- Black Rose of Harlem (1996)
- I Am Woody (2003)
- My Fantastic Field Trip to the Planets (2005)
- Termination Man (1998)
- The Don of 42nd Street (2009)
- Oddly Popular (TV) (2020)
