= Simon Says (film) =

- Theatrical release poster
- Directed by: William Dear
- Written by: Bill Dear
- Produced by: Ernie Lively
- Starring: Crispin Glover; Margo Harshman; Greg Cipes; Kelly Vitz; Carrie Finklea; Artie Baxter; Blake Lively; Bruce Glover
- Cinematography: Bryan Greenberg
- Edited by: Chris Conlee
- Music by: Ludek Drizhal
- Production companies: Blue Cactus Pictures; Dark Moon Pictures; Simon Says Productions
- Distributed by: Barnholtz Entertainment; Lionsgate Home Entertainment
- Release dates: September 24, 2006 (Fantastic Fest); September 25, 2007 (Limited)
- Running time: 87 minutes
- Language: English

Simon Says is a 2006 American slasher film, directed by William Dear and starring Crispin Glover and Margo Harshman. It was premiered at Fantastic Fest on 24 September 2006.

== Plot ==
Five teenagers — Kate (Margo Harshman), Zack (Greg Cipes), Vicky, Riff, and Ashley — are on their way to pan for gold during Spring Break when they make a wrong turn. They encounter two strange men, Pig and Garth, who warn them to return home, saying there have been murders in the area. Making their way into town, four of the teens head inside a store, where they meet brothers Simon (Crispin Glover) and Stanley.

Simon is unhelpful, denying the teens' requests to buy anything. Frustrated, the group leaves and finds a campsite. Unbeknownst to them, someone is observing the teens, dressed in a ghillie suit. He chases Ashley through the woods before realizing that she is not a 'dream girl' and murders her. The attacker - revealed to be Stanley - begins to cut up her body, saying that he will make her into a present for a 'dream girl'.

Back at the store, Zack arrives to find it closed and empty. He lets himself in and discovers numerous bodies hanging from the ceiling, including those of Pig, Garth, and Clay. Zack pulls several newspaper articles off the bodies, as he then flees the store. After dark, Simon arrives and tells the teens Stanley is missing. At this moment, a terrified Zack arrives and manages to convince Simon to leave. The teens find their van's tires punctured, stranding them.

The group heads into the forest to look for Ashley and discovers that Stanley has made a 'doll' out of Ashley's head, hands, and feet. They are watched by Stanley, who kills Riff, while Simon kills Vicky. Kate is stopped by Simon in his truck, who lies and tells her that the others are safe at his store. Zack sneaks up and climbs into the truck bed as Kate gets into the truck. While they are driving, Simon explains that he and Stanley have lived in the area their entire lives with their parents Quinn and Carrie, and took over the gas station when Quinn and Carrie died. Simon takes Kate to an old campsite where two long-decayed bodies are sitting at a picnic table. He ties her to the table when Stanley appears in his ghillie suit. Suspicious, Simon chops off several of Stanley's fingers with a cleaver, and it's revealed that it is actually Zack in the suit, trying to masquerade as Stanley.

Simon ties Zack to a tree and tortures him. Zack confesses his love to Kate calling her his 'Dream Girl.' This angers Simon and he burns Zack alive. Turning back to Kate, Simon announces that he is also Stanley, having taken over his brother's identity after murdering Quinn and Carrie while the real Stanley is in a coma. Kate seduces Simon, distracting him; he accidentally frees her in the ensuing struggle, allowing her to flee.

Returning to Zack's charred body, Kate promises to kill Simon. Moments later, Simon also approaches the body, vowing to kill her. Kate bursts from Zack's corpse where she was hiding, bringing the cleaver down on Simon's head. He falls to the ground, but when she looks down at where his corpse should be, he is gone. A hand reaches for her just before the film cuts to black.

The film ends with another group of youths arriving at the store and asking Simon for directions. Put off by his strange behavior, they leave. Simon goes into the back room and opens a trapdoor, revealing Kate tied up with infant twins before the screen cuts to black.

== Cast ==
- Margo Harshman as Kate
- Crispin Glover as Simon/Stanley
- Greg Cipes as Zack
- Carrie Finklea as Vicky
- Kelly Vitz as Ashley
- Artie Baxter as Riff
- Blake Lively as Jenny
- Erica Hubbard as Clay
- Lori Lively as Lani
- Bruce Glover as Sam
- Daniella Monet as Sarah
- Kelly Blatz as Will
- Robyn Lively as Leanne
- Ernie Lively as Pig
- Bart Johnson as Garth
- Chad Cunningham as Young Stanley
- Chris Cunningham as Young Simon
- Brad Johnson as Quinn
- Jillian Hoss as Carrie
