= Chris Hebert =

American actor

- Born: September 28, 1973 (age 52); Fullerton, California
- Occupations: Actor, teacher
- Years active: 1981–1996

Chris Hebert (born September 28, 1973) is an American former child actor and teacher who has appeared in a number of television series, commercials, and a few feature films.

== Early life ==
Christopher Robin Hebert was born in Fullerton, California, where he has spent most of his life. His acting career began when he was allowed to audition for a local theater production of A Midsummer Night's Dream for one of the parts of the fairies. His mother apparently was reluctant but relented after Hebert's persistence. She had thought that he would not get picked for the part and that this experience would get the acting bug out of his system. However, Hebert got the part and through that summer production, he made connections to a professional agent who got him work in commercials and television before that summer even ended. Hebert continued to work pretty busily for the next five years. His most memorable project came with his feature film debut, The Last Starfighter (1984) as the precocious and likable younger brother, Louis Rogan. Other feature films include The Check Is in the Mail... (1986); a co-starring role for Hebert in Invaders from Mars (1986), The Night Before (1988) and Mortuary Academy (1988). Hebert also did numerous episodic appearances, most notably Family Ties (1982), The Twilight Zone (1985) and Fuzzbucket (1986) (TV)- a Disney TV movie. Hebert's acting career dwindled during his high school years fueled by problems at home, but, in hindsight, he does not regret it. Hebert went on to study film at the University of Southern California's acclaimed School of Cinema-Television, graduating with his B.A. in 1997. During his studies there, he became more and more intrigued with film theory and aesthetics, rather than the technical side of movies. Hebert did star in a low-budget, independent film, Waiting for Mo (1996) made locally in the L.A. area but it was unable to find an audience after its completion.

He is currently a teacher at Fullerton High School, and a summer teacher at Troy High School for History of Motion Pictures.

== Filmography ==
| Year | Title | Role | Notes |
|---|---|---|---|
| 1981-1982 | The Young and the Restless | Phillip Chancellor III | TV series |
| 1983 | Boone | Norman | TV series |
| 1984 | The Hoboken Chicken Emergency | | TV movie |
| 1984 | The Last Starfighter | Louis Rogan | |
| 1985 | Otherworld | Smith Sterling | TV series (episodes 2-4 & 6–8) |
| 1985 | Robert Kennedy & His Times | Robert F. Kennedy, Jr. | Part 1 & 2 |
| 1985 | First the Egg | Robbie | TV movie |
| 1986 | The Check Is in the Mail... | Danny Jackson | |
| 1986 | Fuzzbucket | Michael Gerber | TV movie |
| 1986 | Invaders from Mars | Kevin | |
| 1988 | The Night Before | the Brother | |
| 1988 | Mortuary Academy | Ben Biallystock | |
| 1988 | Dance 'Til Dawn | Kid #2 | TV movie |
| 1996 | Waiting for Mo | Chad | |

== Notable television appearances ==
- Family Ties playing Young Alex in episode "A Keaton Christmas Carol" (episode # 2.9) 14 December 1983
- St. Elsewhere playing Billy McDermott in episode "Equinox" (episode # 2.18) 14 March 1984
- Tales from the Darkside playing Jerry in episode "The New Man" (episode # 1.1) 30 September 1984
- Airwolf playing Rex in episode "Annie Oakley" (episode # 3.8) 16 November 1985
- The Twilight Zone playing Young Gus Rosenthal in episode "One Life, Furnished in Early Poverty" (episode # 1.11b) 6 December 1985
- Murder, She Wrote playing Tommy Rutledge in episode "Simon Says, Color Me Dead" (episode # 3.17) 1 March 1987
