= Jason Lively =

American actor (born 1968)

- Born: Ronald Jason Lively; March 12, 1968 (age 58); Carroll County, Georgia, U.S.
- Occupation: Actor
- Years active: 1979–1993; 2015–2017
- Spouse: Lani Lively (2002–2013)
- Children: 3
- Father: Ernie Lively
- Relatives: Lori Lively (sister); Robyn Lively (sister); Eric Lively (brother); Blake Lively (sister); Ryan Reynolds (brother-in-law); Bart Johnson (brother-in-law)

Ronald Jason Lively (born March 12, 1968) is an American actor and director. He is best known for European Vacation (1985), Night of the Creeps (1986), and Ghost Chase (1987). Lively has mostly retired from acting since the 1990s.

== Early life ==
Ronald Jason Lively was born on March 12, 1968, in Carroll County, Georgia, the son of talent manager Elaine (née McAlpin) and her first husband, Ronald Otis Lively. He is the adopted son of actor Ernie Lively (né Brown), the brother of actresses Lori Lively and Robyn Lively, and the half-brother of actor Eric Lively and actress Blake Lively.

== Career ==
Lively started his career by appearing in the pilot episode of The Dukes of Hazzard when he was 10 years old. His first film appearance was four years later in the 1983 film Brainstorm. That same year he also had another appearance in The Dukes of Hazzard. His most recognizable roles came when he played Rusty Griswald in 1985's National Lampoon's European Vacation, and Chris in 1986's Night of the Creeps.

After that, he appeared in the films Ghost Chase and Maximum Force. In 1993, he appeared in the video game Return to Zork, along with his sisters, Robyn Lively and Lori Lively.

Lively took a 20-yearlong break from acting following 1992's Maximum Force. He would make his return to the screen in the American Western film Hickok.

== Post-acting career ==
Jason Lively has worked for a computer company and was also owner and operator of Jimmy Crack Corn, a mobile roasted corn business.

He is married to Lani Lively. The two share three children.

== Filmography ==
=== Film ===
Year	Title	Role	Notes
1983	Brainstorm	Chris Brace	
1985	National Lampoon's European Vacation	Russell "Rusty" Griswold	
1986	Night of the Creeps	Chris	
1987	Ghost Chase	Warren McCloud	
1990	Monday Morning	Chip Brooks	Also known as Class of Fear
1991	Rock 'n' Roll High School Forever	Donovan	
1992	Maximum Force	Rick Carver	
2015	Vacation	Young Rusty Griswold	Cameo (footage from European Vacation)
2017	Hickok	Ike	
2017	The Possessed	Brian	
2025	In from Outside	Detective Tate	Pre-production

=== Television ===
Year	Title	Role	Notes
1979	The Dukes of Hazzard	Rudy	Episode: "One Armed Bandits"
1983	The Dukes of Hazzard	Rod Moffet / Rudy	2 episodes
1982	ABC Afterschool Specials	Johnny Rollins	Episode: "Daddy, I'm Their Mama Now"
1987	21 Jump Street	Davey Miller	Episode: "Next Generation"
1989–1990	Mancuso, F.B.I.	Justin Summers	3 episodes
1992	Gunsmoke: To the Last Man	Rusty Dover	Television film

=== Video games ===
Year	Title	Role
1993	Return to Zork	Ben Fyshin

== Awards and nominations ==
Year	Award	Category	Nominated work	Result
1983	Young Artist Awards	Best Young Actor in a Television Special	ABC Afterschool Specials (Episode: "Daddy, I'm Their Mama Now"	Nominated
1984	Young Artist Awards	Best Young Actor, Guest in a Television Series	The Dukes of Hazzard	Nominated
1986	Young Artist Awards	Best Starring Performance by a Young Actor - Motion Picture	National Lampoon's European Vacation	Nominated
