= Lori Lively =

American actress

- Occupations: Actress, television co-host/designer, acting coach
- Years active: 1986–present
- Father: Ernie Lively
- Relatives: Jason Lively (brother); Robyn Lively (sister); Eric Lively (brother); Blake Lively (sister); Ryan Reynolds (brother-in-law)

Lori Lively is an American actress, television co-host/designer, and acting coach. She is best known for Dead Space (1991).

== Early life ==
Following Lively's parents' divorce, her mother married acting coach Ernie Lively (né Brown) in 1979. She was later adopted by Ernie, who is the father of her younger siblings, Eric, Jason Lively and Blake Lively. Her mother, adoptive father, and all four siblings are or have been in the entertainment industry.

== Filmography ==
=== Film ===
Year	Title	Role	Notes
1979	The Double McGuffin	Michelle Carter	Credited as Lori Lynn Lively
1986	Night of the Creeps	Lori	Uncredited
1991	Dead Space	Jill	
1992	Timescape	Kelph	Also known as "Grand Tour: Disaster in Time"
1994	The Unborn II	Maternity Ward Nurse	
1998	Sandman	Kim Doll	
1998	Free Enterprise	Leila	
2001	The Ghost	Doris	
2006	Simon Says	Lonnie	
2010	I Kissed a Vampire	Dr. Lori Light	
2012	Walk Of Fame	(Voice)	Short film
2017	Mothers Day	Mags	Short film

=== Television ===
Year	Title	Role	Notes
1986	The New Alfred Hitchcock Presents	Frail Woman	Episode: "The Jar"
1990	Falcon Crest	Woman	Episode: "Time Bomb"
1990-1992	The Bold and the Beautiful	Spectra Model / Forrester Model	2 episodes
1995	Sisters	Penelope	Episode: "Renaissance Woman"
1996	Pacific Blue	Redhead	Episode: "Heatwave"
1998	Star Trek: Deep Space Nine	Siana	Episode: "Shadows and Symbols"
1998	Melrose Place	Maryanne	Episode: "Suddenly Sperm"
2003	ER	Helen	Episode: "Dear Abby"
2004	Two and a Half Men	Kathy	Episode: "Sarah Like Puny Alan"
2004	Complete Savages	Woman #2	Episode: "Savage XXX-mas"
2005	Cold Case	Nancy	Episode: "Start-Up"
2006	Love, Inc.	Carla	Episode: "Grace Under Fire"
2009	The Mentalist	Molly	Episode: "Crimson Casanova"
2009	The Unit	Tom's Mother	Episode: "The Last Nazi"
2010	'Til Death	Carol	Episode: "Dog Fight"
2010	The Defenders	Greta	Episode: "Nevada v. Carter"
2011	Zeke and Luther	Vice Principal Novotona	Episode: "Zeke, Luther and Kojo Strike Gold"

=== Video games ===
Year	Title	Role
1993	Return to Zork	Singing Tree

== Production credits ==
Year	Title	Role	Notes
2008	Mobile Home Disaster	Production Designer	4 episodes
2017	Scales: Mermaids Are Real	Associate Producer	
2021	Palmer	Associate Producer	
