= Fuzzbucket =

1986 American TV film

- DVD cover
- Genre: Fantasy adventure
- Written by: Mick Garris
- Directed by: Mick Garris
- Starring: Chris Hebert; Phil Fondacaro; Joe Regalbuto; Wendy Phillips; Robyn Lively; John Vernon; Fran Ryan; Hal Smith
- Music by: Peter Bernstein
- Country of origin: United States
- Original language: English

Production
- Executive producer: John Landis
- Producer: Mick Garris
- Cinematography: Robert M. Stevens
- Editor: Michael S. Murphy
- Running time: 46 minutes
- Production companies: The Samuel Goldwyn Company; Walt Disney Television

Original release
- Network: ABC
- Release: May 18, 1986

Fuzzbucket is a 1986 American fantasy adventure television film written, produced and directed by Mick Garris, starring Chris Hebert as Michael Gerber. Phil Fondacaro physically portrays Michael's invisible friend, Fuzzbucket, while Hal Smith provides the character's voice. The film also stars Joe Regalbuto as Michael's dad, Wendy Phillips as his mother, Robyn Lively as his older sister, and John Vernon as the Principal. It was produced by The Samuel Goldwyn Company in association with Walt Disney Television, and aired on ABC on May 18, 1986, as an episode of The Disney Sunday Movie.

== Plot ==
Michael Gerber is an awkward young boy who is about to start junior high and has no real friends. His family life is in turmoil, as his father and mother are constantly fighting. His only companion is an imaginary friend he calls Fuzzbucket. In the first act of the film, both the viewer and every character except Michael is left to make the assumption that Fuzzbucket is an imaginary friend. When Michael cooks up a strange, green concoction for his friend to drink, Fuzzbucket turns visible again. Astonished to see Fuzzbucket for the first time, young Michael becomes overjoyed. His newly visible friend exuberantly leaps around Michael's treehouse in celebration. The two friends share a heartfelt moment in his treehouse when Fuzzbucket traces their hands with crayons, a ceremony that makes them blood brothers. At Fuzzbucket's urgent request for "Toons! Toons!" Michael switches on his television and the two sit together watching classic cartoons, and they soon drift off to sleep. Hours later, Fuzzbucket awakens and insists on knowing the time. He urgently cries to Michael, "How many clocks? How many clocks!?" Fearing that if he doesn't make it back home in time he will turn invisible again, only this time it will be forever. Fuzzbucket leaps out of the treehouse and escapes into the woods. Michael, afraid of losing his one and only friend, takes off after him.

Fuzzbucket repeatedly tries to distance himself from Michael while trying to get back to an underground lair full of other rat-like creatures similar to Fuzzbucket. At one point, Fuzzbucket is found in a dumpster with a rat eating his tail. Michael picks up a can and throws it at the rat, knocking it off of his friend's tail. Fuzzbucket thanks Michael for "saving his life," taking his hand, kissing it, and making a strange slurping sound. He runs off and Michael gives chase. Michael tracks the creature into the woods and falls into his lair. He arrives in a chamber where Fuzzbucket creatures scatter in fright. The actual Fuzzbucket shows up and tells Michael that since he helped him, Fuzzbucket will help him also. Michael is found by a search party underneath a tree shortly after. They all return home, where his mother and father find gifts in their room left behind by Fuzzbucket. The father opens up a novelty sized Hershey's Kiss, while the mother opens up a music box. They set their gifts aside and share an intimate moment, when the camera pans to show Fuzzbucket sneaking away from the house.

== Characters ==
Fuzzbucket is a hairy creature that lives in the swamps of Dead Man's Marsh with many other fuzzbuckets. The character is called "Fuzzbucket" by Michael, but also is a fuzzbucket. It is not explained whether all fuzzbuckets have different names.

Michael Gerber is a 12-year-old boy and main character of the film. He is dealing with his first day of junior high and fitting in. Everyone in the film finds him odd or weird due to the fact they always think he is talking to himself, when he is in fact talking to Fuzzbucket.

== Home media ==
Disney released a DVD-on-Demand version of this film as part of their "Disney Generations Collection" line of DVDs on July 5, 2011. The film was included in the at-launch library of Disney+.
