= Blake Lively =

American actress (born 1987)

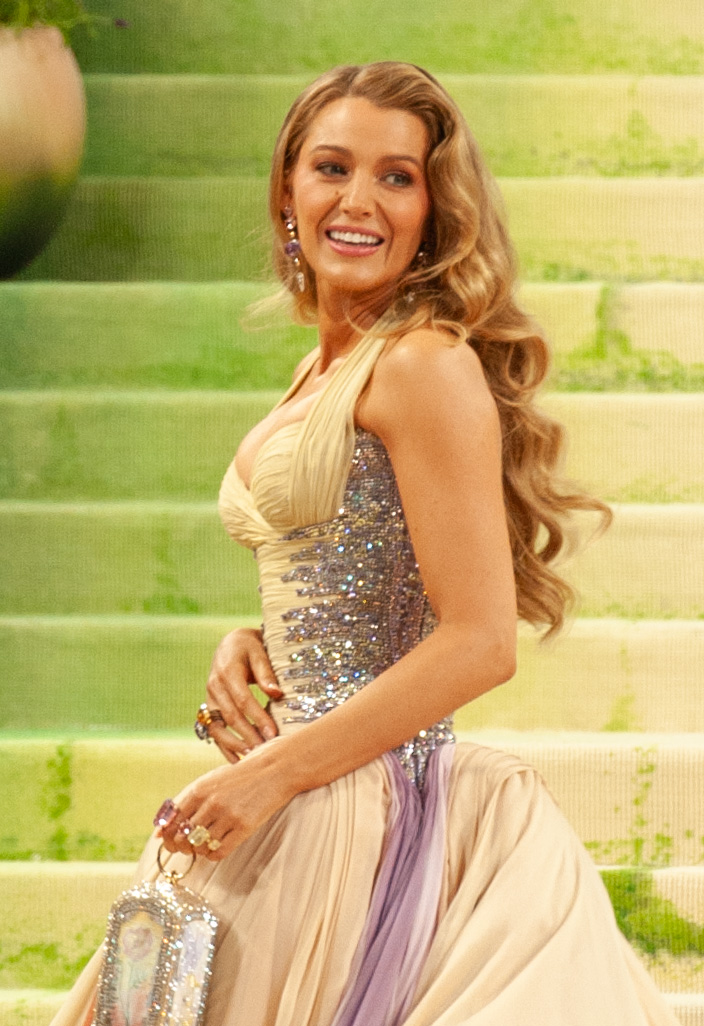
- Lively at the 2026 Met Gala
- Born: Blake Ellender Brown; August 25, 1987 (age 39); Los Angeles, California, U.S.
- Occupation: Actress
- Years active: 1998–present
- Spouse: Ryan Reynolds (m. 2012)
- Children: 4
- Father: Ernie Lively
- Family: Eric Lively (brother); Lori Lively (half-sister); Robyn Lively (half-sister); Jason Lively (half-brother)

Blake Ellender Brown (born August 25, 1987), known professionally as Blake Lively, (Note: Lively was born with the surname Brown, but uses her family's stage name, which came from her mother's name.) is an American actress and entrepreneur.

A daughter of actor Ernie Lively, she made her professional debut in his directorial project Sandman (1998). She had her breakthrough role in The Sisterhood of the Traveling Pants (2005) and its 2008 sequel. Lively achieved stardom with her portrayal of Serena van der Woodsen in the CW teen drama television series Gossip Girl (2007–2012). During this period, she also took on supporting roles in the romantic comedies New York, I Love You (2008) and The Private Lives of Pippa Lee (2009), as well as in the thrillers The Town (2010) and Savages (2012).

She starred in the romantic fantasy The Age of Adaline (2015), the survival film The Shallows (2016), the comedy Café Society (2016), and the comedy thriller A Simple Favor (2018) as well as its 2025 sequel. She expanded her career by directing Taylor Swift's 2021 music video "I Bet You Think About Me". Lively produced and starred in the romantic drama It Ends with Us (2024).

== Early life ==
Blake Ellender Brown was born on August 25, 1987, in the Tarzana neighborhood of Los Angeles, California. Her mother, Elaine Lively (née McAlpin), worked as a talent scout, and her father, Ernie Lively (né Brown), was an actor and director. Lively was named after her grandmother's brother. She has an older brother, Eric, and three half-siblings from her mother's previous marriage, Lori, Robyn, and Jason. Her parents and siblings have all worked in the entertainment industry.

During Lively's childhood, her parents took her along to the acting classes they taught, rather than leave her with babysitters. She later said that watching her parents teach helped her learn the "drills" and gain confidence as she got older and began working in the industry herself. She made her professional debut at age 10, appearing in the 1998 film Sandman, directed by her father. Lively describes her role as a "bit part". She was initially not interested in acting and wanted to attend Stanford University.

She is a 2005 graduate of Burbank High School, where she was a cheerleader, a member of the championship choir, and class president. Her older brother asked his talent agent to send her to several auditions during the summer months. Subsequently, Lively was cast as Bridget in The Sisterhood of the Traveling Pants (2005) and filmed her scenes between her junior and senior years of high school.

== Career ==
=== 2005–2006: Career beginnings ===
The Sisterhood of the Traveling Pants was released in 2005. Lively's performance earned her a nomination for a Teen Choice Award for "Choice Movie Breakout – Female". In 2006, Lively co-starred with Justin Long in Accepted, and she had minor roles in the horror film, Simon Says. Accepted was not well received by critics, but Lively's performance was, earning her a 'Breakthrough Award' from Hollywood Life. Lively starred in Elvis and Anabelle (2007) as Anabelle, a bulimic girl who hoped to win a beauty pageant. She said of getting into character for the role that she had "shed serious weight" for her height. She stated that food was "the No. 1 love of my life", which made that process difficult for her.

=== 2007–2012: Gossip Girl ===
Lively was cast in The CW's series Gossip Girl, based on the novel series Gossip Girl by Cecily von Ziegesar, which premiered in September 2007. Already having deferred college for a year, Lively intended to turn the role down and become a student, but was told that she could attend college part-time while filming the show (she later said "This is advice to anyone: when they say, 'We promise, but we can't put it in writing,' there's a reason they can't put it in writing"). She played the role of Serena van der Woodsen in the teen drama until 2012 when the show ended. Her first magazine cover was the November 2007 issue of CosmoGirl, where she discussed her time in high school and her career prior to Gossip Girl. In 2008, Lively reprised her role as Bridget in the sequel The Sisterhood of the Traveling Pants 2. Similarly to the first film, Lively's performance was positively received by critics. As of November 2008, the film had earned over $44 million at the box office. In 2009, she appeared as Gabrielle DiMarco in the romantic comedy New York, I Love You, a sequel to the 2006 film Paris, je t'aime. Despite positive reception among critics, the film failed at the box office.

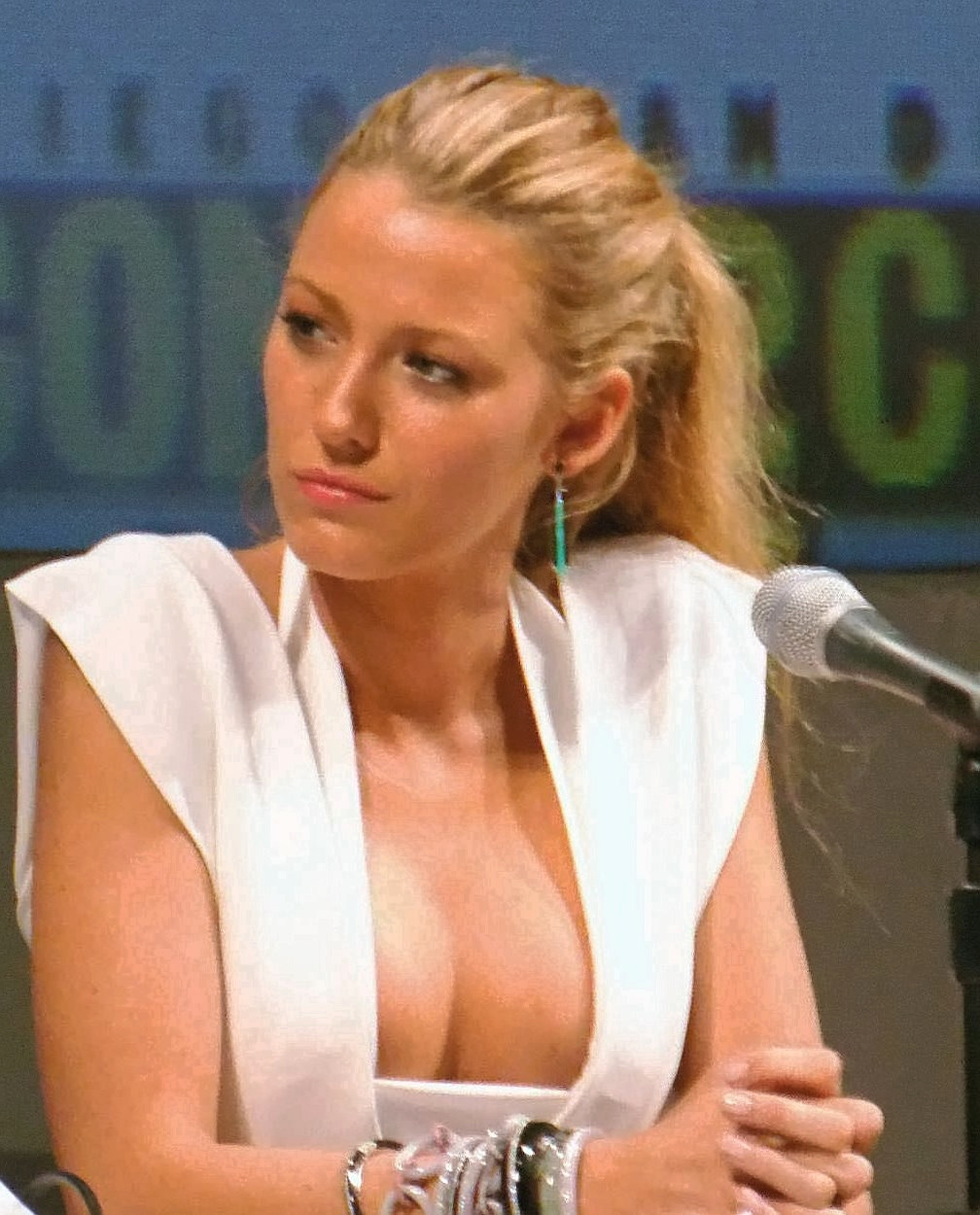
Lively at the 2010 San Diego Comic-Con

Lively portrayed the younger version of the titular character in The Private Lives of Pippa Lee (2009) to critical acclaim. Paul Byrnes, of the Brisbane Times, described her performance in the film as "sensational". In October 2009, she began filming her scenes for her role as Kristina "Kris" Coughlin in the 2010 film The Town, based on Chuck Hogan's novel Prince of Thieves. The film, which was directed by and starred Ben Affleck, was released in the United States on September 17, 2010. On her performance, Variety wrote that Lively was "almost unrecognizable [and] has fierce, pained moments as the moll and single mother...tossed aside". In December of that year, she appeared in the music video for The Lonely Island's "I Just Had Sex" together with Jessica Alba. Lively played Carol Ferris, the female lead and love interest of Hal Jordan in the superhero film Green Lantern, which was released in June 2011. The film grossed a worldwide total of $219,851,172. In 2011, she was featured in Time magazine's annual list "The 2011 Time 100".

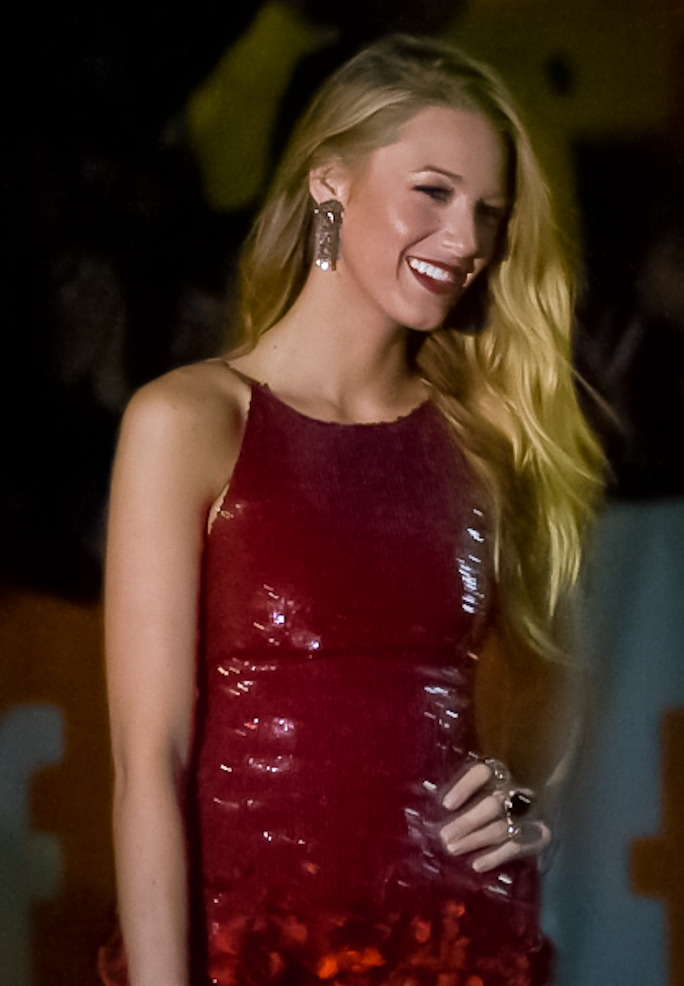
Lively at the 2011 Toronto International Film Festival

In 2012, Lively starred in Oliver Stone's Savages alongside Taylor Kitsch, Aaron Johnson, Salma Hayek, and John Travolta. She replaced Jennifer Lawrence as Ophelia, after Lawrence dropped out to do The Hunger Games. HitFix film critic Drew McWeeny said Lively's performance was "smart and sad precisely because she plays O as such a broken, needy little soul". Also that year, she was selected as the face of the new Gucci fragrance, Gucci Premiere. She appeared in a short film ad directed by Nicolas Winding Refn for the fragrance.

=== Since 2013: Film career ===
She starred in the film The Age of Adaline (2015), opposite Michiel Huisman and Harrison Ford, playing a woman who "stops aging after recovering from a near-fatal accident." The Atlantic stated that she showed her "potential as a leading lady" primarily in the second half of the film, citing her "clipped delivery and coy restraint" as well as her "capable perform[ance]" within the emotional intensity of the film. In 2016, Lively starred in the survival horror film The Shallows. It received positive reviews and her performance was praised by critics. That year, she also starred in Woody Allen's romantic comedy film, Café Society which premiered at the 69th Cannes Film Festival. During the film's press tour, Lively was asked about working with Allen amid sexual abuse allegations made by his daughter, Dylan Farrow. On her experience working with Allen, Lively stated, "It's really cool to work with a director who's done so much, because he knows exactly what he wants", and described him as "very empowering". Asked about Ronan Farrow's essay criticizing Allen's collaborators, she declined to comment, saying she had not read it.

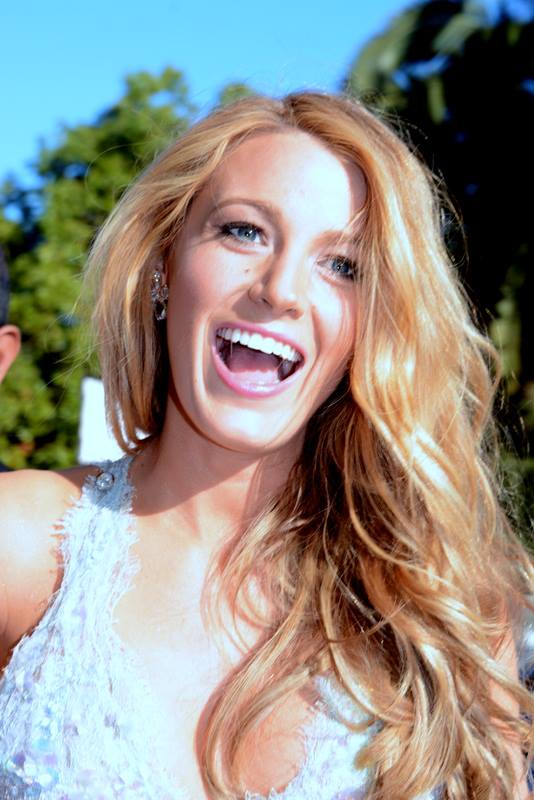
Lively at 2014 Cannes Film Festival

Lively starred opposite Jason Clarke in psychological drama All I See Is You (2016), which premiered at the Toronto International Film Festival and received mixed reviews. In 2018, she starred in the mystery-thriller A Simple Favor, alongside Anna Kendrick and Henry Golding, and directed by Paul Feig. The film was released on September 14 and Lively's performance was acclaimed. Variety wrote that "She has her moments...many of them physical...Lively's Emily is both repellent and irresistible". Some critics believed Lively could achieve her first Academy Award nomination for the role; however a nomination never eventuated.

Lively next played the lead, a drug-addicted prostitute turned assassin, in The Rhythm Section (2020), the film adaptation of the Mark Burnell novel The Rhythm Section, produced by Barbara Broccoli and Michael G. Wilson, and directed by Reed Morano. The film was released by Paramount Pictures. Variety noted Lively's performance as "display[ing] a realistic near-incompetence in the face of danger [that] makes her relatable in ways very few cinematic assassins have ever been".

In May 2021, it was announced that Lively would star in Lady Killer as the lead character, Josie Schuller. She made her directorial debut as the co-writer and director of the music video for Taylor Swift's song "I Bet You Think About Me" featuring American singer-songwriter Chris Stapleton, released on November 15, 2021, from Swift's re-recorded album Red (Taylor's Version) (2021). In April 2022, it was announced Lively would make her feature directing debut with an adaptation of the graphic novel Seconds by Bryan Lee O'Malley, with Edgar Wright writing the screenplay and producing. In January 2023, it was announced that she would star in the romantic drama film adaptation of Colleen Hoover's novel It Ends with Us as the lead character, Lily Bloom.

In August 2024, Lively and her husband Ryan Reynolds became the first married Hollywood couple to have two separate films in which they starred top the box office on the same weekend since Bruce Willis and Demi Moore in 1990. Their respective films It Ends With Us and Deadpool & Wolverine occupied the number one and number two spots at the box office during the weekend of August 9–11.

In 2025, Lively narrated National Geographic's TV Mini Series, Secrets of the Penguins. The three part series was nominated for three Emmy awards and a BAFTA.

== Other ventures ==
Lively has described herself as a "foodie and cook", and has said that Martha Stewart is her "idol". She has also said that she is a fan of Nigella Lawson's work. In 2008, Lively baked a cake with Stewart during an episode of The Martha Stewart Show. Lively attended a 2010 tailor-made workshop at Le Cordon Bleu in Paris, and has spoken of her desire to return to the culinary school for further instruction.

She has remarked that, when traveling, she always takes cookery classes to immerse herself in the local culture. Lively has also spoken publicly of her desire to become a restaurateur. In 2011, she created a s'mores cupcake to be sold at Sprinkles bakeries. In 2012, Lively's wedding reception was featured in Martha Stewart Weddings; food photography was the focal point of the picture spread. In 2013, she appeared in Elle Decor to recount her experiences designing a custom La Cornue oven for her newly purchased Bedford home. She filmed a cooking segment in 2013 for Vogue's website, demonstrating how to make a brie pastry.

Lively launched Preserve in 2014, a digital magazine and e-commerce website with hand-made one-of-a-kind items all selected by Lively. In October 2014, Preserve published a fashion editorial titled "Allure of Antebellum", which referenced aesthetics of the pre‑Civil War American South. Critics argued the editorial romanticized an era defined by slavery while focusing on imagery linked to white Southern elite culture. In October 2015, Lively closed the site stating that it had been launched before it was ready and that she planned to rebuild and relaunch it properly. In 2025, six former staffers of Preserve alleged that they experienced a "toxic" working environment. One allegedly received a settlement of up to $300,000 after threatening legal action.

In 2021, Lively launched Betty Buzz, a line of non-alcoholic drink mixers. In 2023, Lively launched Betty Booze, a line of alcoholic canned cocktails. In 2024, Lively launched Blake Brown, a cruelty-free haircare line. Betty Buzz quietly shut down in 2025.

== Public image ==
Lively's public image has been shaped by her acting career, fashion presence, and business ventures. Her role on Gossip Girl established an association with glamour, luxury, and high fashion. She has frequently appeared in advertising campaigns and brand collaborations. She became notorious for not working with a stylist. Her appearances at events including the Met Gala, frequently received extensive media coverage and she served as a co‑chair of the event in 2022.

Maxim included Lively in their Hot 100 list in 2009 and 2013, ranking her #33 and #24 respectively. Additionally, AskMen.com named her the most desirable woman of 2011 and People magazine named her one of 2012's Most Beautiful at Every Age.

In May 2016, Lively received public criticism following an Instagram post made during the 2016 Cannes Film Festival that featured an image of her in a form‑fitting gown accompanied by the caption "L.A. face with an Oakland booty", a lyric from Sir Mix-a-Lot's song "Baby Got Back". The caption sparked a backlash on social media, with some commentators describing it as racially insensitive. Sir Mix‑A‑Lot publicly stated that he viewed her comment as consistent with the song's original message of celebrating diverse body types.

=== Controversy ===
Lively's public image gained heightened scrutiny following the promotion and release of the film It Ends With Us in late 2024. She was criticized by some commentators for a marketing approach described as overly light‑hearted given the film's focus on domestic violence.

In December 2024, The New York Times published an article reporting allegations by Lively that director/co-star Justin Baldoni and his associates had orchestrated a campaign to damage her reputation following disputes related to the film. That same month, Lively filed a complaint with the California Civil Rights Department against Baldoni, Wayfarer Studios, and others associated with the production, alleging sexual harassment, retaliation, and a coordinated smear campaign. She subsequently filed a federal lawsuit. Baldoni countersued Lively, Reynolds, and their publicist for civil extortion, defamation, and invasion of privacy. His lawsuit was dismissed in June 2025. In April 2026, 10 of Lively's 13 claims were dismissed by the judge, including her sexual harassment claim against Baldoni. The judge allowed her remaining claims to proceed. The parties settled in May 2026 shortly before trial. A court filing confirmed the settlement had no financial payout.

In June 2026, the judge ruled that Lively was entitled to recover legal fees and litigation costs from Wayfarer Studios, Baldoni's production company, for defending against the defamation claim in his dismissed countersuit. However, her request to receive punitive and treble damages was denied. Blake Lively has been awarded over $407,000 in legal fees in her long-running dispute with Justin Baldoni. U.S. District Judge L. Liman issued the ruling on Aug 26, granting Lively $363,245.40 in attorneys' fees and $44,206.35 in costs for work related to her defense against Baldoni's dismissed defamation countersuit.

== Personal life ==
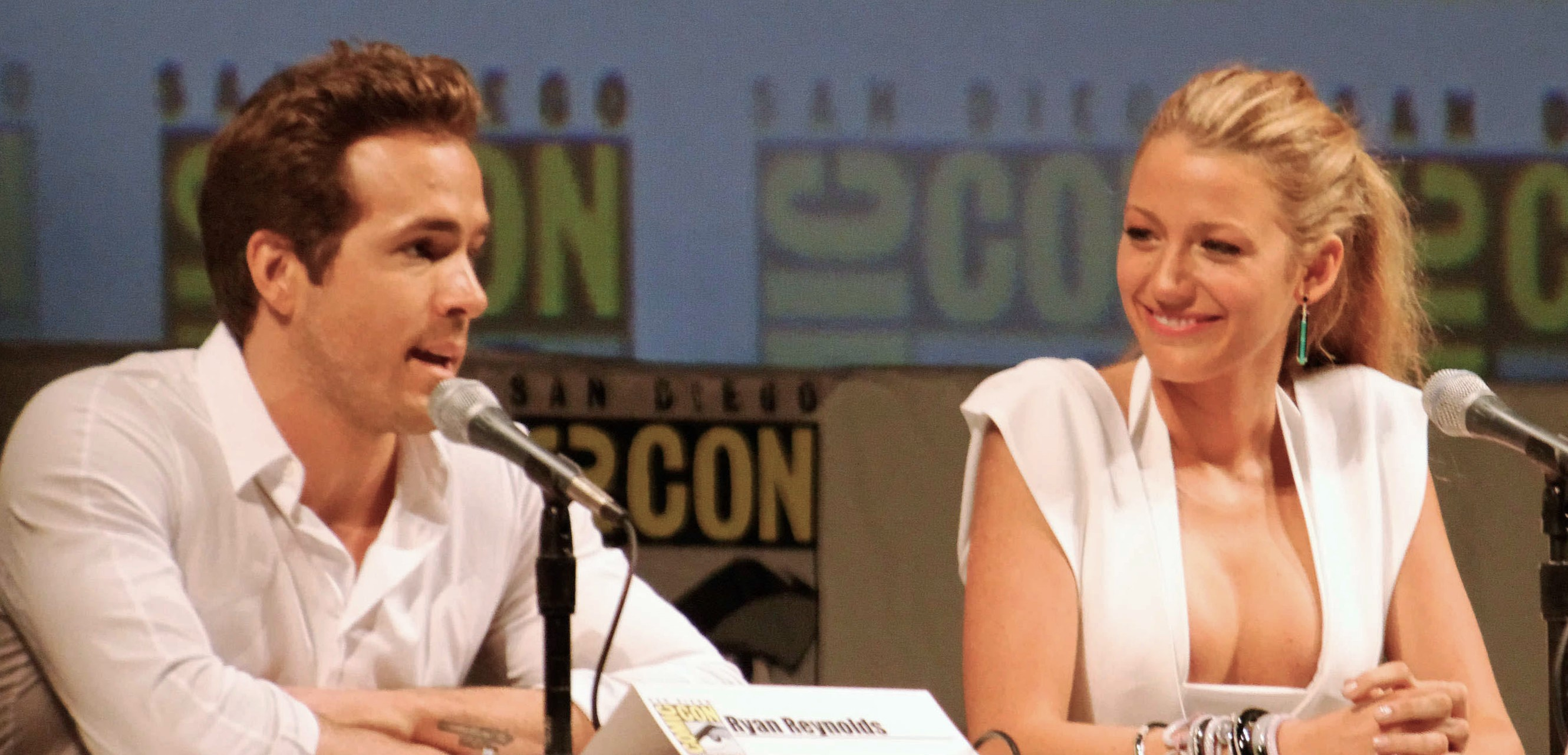
Lively with future husband Ryan Reynolds, promoting Green Lantern at Comic-Con 2010

From 2007 to 2010, Lively was in a relationship with her Gossip Girl co-star Penn Badgley. She was romantically linked with Leonardo DiCaprio during 2011.

Lively first met Ryan Reynolds in early 2010 while filming Green Lantern, in which they co-starred. They began dating in October 2011 and married on September 9, 2012, at Boone Hall Plantation in Mount Pleasant, South Carolina a site historically associated with enslaved African Americans. The venue choice later drew criticism, particularly during renewed public discussion of racial justice, such as the George Floyd protests, beginning in 2020. In August of that year, Reynolds and Lively publicly apologized and expressed deep regret for choosing the venue. They subsequently made a $200,000 donation to the NAACP Legal Defense and Educational Fund.

Lively and Reynolds have four children: Three daughters – James (b. 2014), Inez (b. 2016), Betty (b. 2019) – as well as a son, Olin (b. 2023). The family resides in Pound Ridge, New York. Singer-songwriter Taylor Swift named the characters in her song "Betty" after Reynolds and Lively's youngest daughter. Swift is the godmother to Lively's three daughters.

In a 2012 conversation with Allure, Lively said that she does not drink and has never tried drugs.

== Advocacy and endorsements ==
During the 2008 United States presidential election, Lively expressed her support for Barack Obama. Lively and Penn Badgley appeared in a pro-Obama commercial, as part of MoveOn.org's Youth Vote program. The commercial, directed by Doug Liman, aired during Gossip Girl on the CW, MTV, and Comedy Central. In 2013, she appeared in a video clip for Gucci's "Chime for Change" campaign that aims to raise funds and awareness of women's issues in the areas of education, health, and justice. In addition, Lively has worked to heighten public awareness of missing and exploited children and on-going efforts of law enforcement on their behalf.

In 2011, Lively became a spokeswoman for Chanel and their new Mademoiselle handbag. In October 2013, she became a spokeswoman for L'Oreal.

== Filmography ==
=== Film ===
Year	Title	Role	Notes	Ref.
1998	Sandman	Trixie / Tooth Fairy		
2005	The Sisterhood of the Traveling Pants	Bridget Vreeland		
2006	Accepted	Monica Moreland		
2006	Simon Says	Jenny		
2007	Elvis and Anabelle	Anabelle Leigh		
2008	The Sisterhood of the Traveling Pants 2	Bridget Vreeland		
2008	New York, I Love You	Gabrielle DiMarco		
2009	The Private Lives of Pippa Lee	Young Pippa Lee		
2010	The Town	Kristina "Kris" Coughlin		
2011	Green Lantern	Carol Ferris		
2011	Hick	Glenda		
2012	Savages	Ophelia "O" Sage		
2015	The Age of Adaline	Adaline Marie Bowman / Jennifer Larson		
2016	The Shallows	Nancy Adams		
2016	Café Society	Veronica Hayes		
2017	All I See Is You	Gina		
2018	A Simple Favor	Emily Nelson / Faith McLanden		
2020	The Rhythm Section	Stephanie Patrick		
2024	IF	Octopuss (voice)		
2024	Deadpool & Wolverine	Lady Deadpool (voice)	Cameo	
2024	It Ends with Us	Lily Bloom	Also executive producer	
2025	Another Simple Favor	Emily Nelson / Charity McLanden		

=== Television ===
Year	Title	Role	Notes
2007–2012	Gossip Girl	Serena van der Woodsen	Main role; 121 episodes
2009	Saturday Night Live	Herself (host)	Episode: "Blake Lively/Rihanna"
2018	When You Wish Upon a Pickle: A Sesame Street Special	Delivery person	Television special
2025	Secrets of the Penguins	Narrator	Television mini series

=== Music videos ===
Year	Title	Role	Artist	Notes
2010	"I Just Had Sex"	Unsatisfied Girlfriend	The Lonely Island featuring Akon	
2014	"Part II (On the Run)"	Herself	Jay-Z featuring Beyoncé	
2021	"I Bet You Think About Me"	—N/a	Taylor Swift featuring Chris Stapleton	Co-writer, producer, and director

== Awards and nominations ==
Year	Award	Category	Nominated work	Result	Ref.
2005	Teen Choice Awards	Choice Movie Breakout Female	The Sisterhood of the Traveling Pants	Nominated	
2008	Teen Choice Awards	Choice Female Hottie	—N/a	Nominated	
2008	Teen Choice Awards	Choice TV Actress Drama	Gossip Girl	Won	
2008	Teen Choice Awards	Choice TV Breakout Star-Female	Gossip Girl	Won	
2008	Newport Beach Film Festival	Achievement Award-Breakout Performance	Elvis and Anabelle	Won	
2009	ASTRA Award	Favourite International Personality or Actor	Gossip Girl	Nominated	
2009	Teen Choice Awards	Choice TV Actress Drama	Gossip Girl	Nominated	
2009	Teen Choice Awards	Choice Female Hottie	—N/a	Nominated	
2010	People's Choice Awards	Favorite TV Drama Actress	Gossip Girl	Nominated	
2010	Teen Choice Awards	Choice TV Actress Drama	Gossip Girl	Nominated	
2010	Critics' Choice Movie Awards	Best Acting Ensemble	The Town	Nominated	
2010	National Board of Review	Best Ensemble Cast	The Town	Won	
2010	San Diego Film Critics Society	Best Supporting Actress	The Town	Nominated	
2010	Washington D.C. Area Film Critics Association	Best Ensemble	The Town	Won	
2011	People's Choice Award	Favorite TV Drama Actress	Gossip Girl	Nominated	
2011	CinemaCon Award	Breakthrough Performer of the Year Award	—N/a	Won	
2011	Teen Choice Awards	Choice Movie Actress Sci Fi/Fantasy	Green Lantern	Nominated	
2011	Teen Choice Awards	Choice TV Actress Drama	Gossip Girl	Won	
2012	People's Choice Award	Favorite TV Drama Actress	Gossip Girl	Nominated	
2012	Jupiter Award	Best International Actress	Green Lantern	Nominated	
2013	Teen Choice Awards	Choice TV Actress Drama	Gossip Girl	Nominated	
2015	Teen Choice Awards	Choice Movie Actress: Drama	The Age of Adaline	Nominated	
2015	Teen Choice Awards	Choice Movie: Liplock (shared with Michiel Huisman)	The Age of Adaline	Nominated	
2016	Saturn Award	Best Actress	The Age of Adaline	Nominated	
2016	Teen Choice Awards	Choice Style: Female	—N/a	Nominated	
2016	Teen Choice Awards	Choice Summer Movie Star: Female	The Shallows	Nominated	
2017	People's Choice Awards	Favorite Dramatic Movie Actress	The Shallows	Won	
2017	Jupiter Award	Best International Actress	The Shallows	Nominated	
2021	Critics' Choice Super Awards	Best Actress in an Action Movie	The Rhythm Section	Nominated	
2022	Academy of Country Music Awards	Video of the Year	"I Bet You Think About Me"	Nominated	
2022	Country Music Association Awards	Music Video of the Year	"I Bet You Think About Me"	Nominated	
