= Night of the Creeps =

1986 American comedy horror film directed by Fred Dekker

- Theatrical release poster
- Directed by: Fred Dekker
- Written by: Fred Dekker
- Produced by: Charles Gordon
- Starring: Jason Lively; Steve Marshall; Jill Whitlow; Tom Atkins
- Cinematography: Robert C. New
- Edited by: Michael N. Knue
- Music by: Barry De Vorzon
- Distributed by: Tri-Star Pictures
- Release date: August 22, 1986
- Running time: 88 minutes
- Country: United States
- Language: English
- Box office: $591,366 (US)

Night of the Creeps is a 1986 American science fiction horror comedy film written and directed by Fred Dekker in his feature directorial debut, starring Jason Lively, Jill Whitlow, and Tom Atkins. The film is an earnest attempt at a B movie and an homage to the genre. While the main plot of the film is related to zombies, the film also mixes in takes on slashers and alien invasion films. Night of the Creeps did not perform well at the box office, but it developed a cult following.

In the film, a college student and his best friend steal a cadaver from a cryogenics lab, as part of an initiation rite in a local fraternity. The "corpse" is an undead body from the late 1950s, and is under the control of an extraterrestrial organism. Soon, several other people are infected with these alien slugs.

== Plot ==
In 1959, on board a spacecraft, two aliens race to keep an experiment from being released by a third member of the crew. The seemingly possessed third alien shoots the canister into space where it crashes to Earth. Nearby, a college man takes his date to a parking spot when they see a falling star and investigate. It lands in the path of an escaped criminally insane patient. As his date is attacked by the axe-wielding maniac, the boy finds the canister, from which a small slug-like thing jumps out and into his mouth.

Twenty-seven years later in 1986, Chris Romero pines over a love lost, supported by his disabled friend J.C. Hooper. During pledge week at Corman University, Chris spots a girl, Cynthia Cronenberg, and falls instantly in love. To get her attention, he decides to join a fraternity. Cynthia's boyfriend, who heads the Beta Epsilon fraternity, tasks them with stealing a cadaver from the university medical center and depositing it on the steps of a rival fraternity house. Chris and J.C. find a frozen corpse in a secret room, but when it grabs them, they flee. The thawed corpse then kills a medical student working at the lab.

Detective Ray Cameron, a haunted cop, is called in to the cryogenics lab break-in, where he discovers one of the bodies – the boy who discovered the alien experiment in 1959 – is now missing, set free by Chris and J.C. The corpse makes its way back to the sorority house where he picked up his date twenty-seven years ago. There, his head splits open and releases more of the slugs. Called to the scene, Cameron finds the body, interpreting the condition of the head as the result of an axe wound in the face.

The next day, the fraternity brothers confront Chris and J.C., who they believe to be responsible for the previous night's incident. They are then taken in for questioning by the police. Based on the testimony of a janitor who witnessed them running out of the university medical center, "screaming like banshees," they confess to breaking in but deny moving the corpse. That night, the dead medical student rises from his slab and runs into the janitor.

Cynthia attempts to convince Chris and J.C. that the attacks are zombie-related, but they are skeptical. When J.C. sees Cynthia leaning on Chris' shoulder, J.C. leaves the two alone and is attacked by the slugs that emerge from the possessed janitor. After Chris walks Cynthia back to the sorority house, he runs into Cameron, who has overheard their conversation. At his house, Cameron explains to Chris that the escaped lunatic's 1959 victim was his ex-girlfriend, and that he secretly hunted down and killed the axe-murderer in revenge. After Cameron reveals that he buried the body under what is now the house mother’s house, he gets a call that the same axe-wielding lunatic has killed the house mother. Cameron blows off the corpse's head with his shotgun, which releases more slugs.

The next night, while everyone prepares for a formal dance, Chris finds a recorded message that J.C. posthumously left for him. J.C. says that the slugs have incubated in his brain, but he has discovered that they are susceptible to heat. He confesses his love to Chris, and wishes him luck with Cynthia. Chris recruits Cameron, who was in the midst of a suicide attempt, and they retrieve a flamethrower from the police armory. They arrive at the sorority house just as Cynthia breaks up with Brad, who has become possessed. After killing him, the Beta fraternity brothers show up, despite having been killed in a bus crash. Cynthia and Chris team up to destroy the outside zombies while Cameron clears the house.

After they stop the horde, Chris spots more slugs racing toward the basement; Cynthia explains that a member of the sorority had received specimen brains for biology class. In the basement, they find an enormous pile of slugs and Cameron, tape across his mouth, prepping a can of gasoline. The detective begins counting down as he splashes gasoline and Chris counts down in sync with him as he and Cynthia race out of the house. As Cameron opens up the house's gas valve, several slugs leap to attack him. He flicks his lighter and the house goes up in a fiery explosion. Chris and Cynthia share a kiss as they watch the house burn.

=== Endings ===
The film has two endings, one of which was used for the film's theatrical release and the other is the ending originally intended by director Fred Dekker. In the theatrical version, the dog who caused the bus accident returns and approaches Cynthia. As Cynthia bends down toward it, the dog opens its mouth and a slug jumps out toward her.

The original ending shows Chris and Cynthia standing in front of the burning sorority house, with the camera moving to the street where police cars race towards the burning building. The police cars race by the charred and 'zombified' Cameron who is shuffling down the street, still smoking a cigarette, when he suddenly stops and falls to the ground. His head then bursts open and the slugs that incubated inside his brain scamper out and slither towards a nearby cemetery, suggesting the slugs have found new hosts to inhabit. Searchlights appear from the night sky, revealing the source to be the spaceship from the beginning of the film, with the aliens intending to retrieve their experiment.

== Cast ==
- Jason Lively as Chris Romero
- Steve Marshall as James Carpenter "J.C." Hooper
- Tom Atkins as Det. Ray Cameron
  - Dave Alan Johnson as Young Cameron
- Jill Whitlow as Cynthia Cronenberg
- Allan Kayser as Brad
- Wally Taylor as Det. Landis
- Bruce Solomon as Sgt. Raimi
- David Paymer as Hollister
- David Oliver as Steve
- Dick Miller as Walt
- Ken Heron as Johnny
- Alice Cadogan as Pam
- Suzanne Snyder as Lisa
- John J. York as Todd
- June Harris as Karen
- Jay Arlen Jones as Officer Craven
- Elizabeth Alda as Officer Bava
- Robert Kino as Mr. Miner
- Lori Lively as Lori
- Vic Polizos as Coroner
- Dan Frischman as Alien Zombie
- Evelyne Smith as House Mother
- Shane Black as Cop
- Robert Kerman as Patrolman
- Robert Kurtzman and Howard Berger as Beta Zombies

== Production ==
Director Fred Dekker originally wanted to shoot the film in black and white. He included every B movie cliche he could think of and insisted on directing the script himself. Most of the main characters (Romero, Carpenter, Raimi, Landis, Hooper, Cronenberg, Cameron, Miner, Craven, Bava) are named after horror movie makers. The script was written in a week.

== Soundtrack ==
Night of the Creeps - Original Motion Picture Soundtrack

Soundtrack album by Barry DeVorzon
- Released: October 27, 2009
- Length: 1:11:26
- Label: La-La Land Records

The soundtrack album, featuring Barry DeVorzon's score for the film (except tracks 22-26), was issued in 2009 by La-La Land Records. Asterisked tracks include sound effects.

1. Main Title (3:32)
2. The Axe Man Cometh (1:15)
3. I'm Your Bud (:37)
4. Cylo Lab/It's Alive (2:42)
5. Thrill Me's Dream (:53)
6. Cindy's Scream (3:43)
7. Done With An Axe (:33)
8. Screaming Like Banshees (1:23)
9. Zombie Cat/Zombie (:27)
10. The Bathroom Stall (2:38)
11. Will You Go With Me? (1:12)
12. I Took My Twelve Gauge/Return Of The Axe Man (2:15)
13. I Already Killed You (2:06)
14. What's The Tux For?*(1:08)
15. J.C.'s Last Note (3:10)
16. Zombie Dog/Turned Over Bus/Zombies Break Out (1:40)
17. March Of The Zombies (5:42)
18. The Count Down*(3:12)
19. End Credit Suite (4:18)

Bonus Tracks:

1. The Bathroom Stall (no overlay) (2:38)
2. The Count Down – not used in final film (3:39)
3. Smoke Gets In Your Eyes – The Platters (2:40)
4. The Stroll – The Diamonds (2:30)
5. Nightmares – C-Spot Run (4:39)
6. Solitude (arr. Barry DeVorzon) (4:08)
7. An Interview with Barry DeVorzon (8:46)

== Release ==
Night of the Creeps was released on August 22, 1986, in the United States. In the Philippines, the film was released on March 5, 1987, with free "protector" stickers handed out for early moviegoers to put on during the screening. The domestic gross was $591,366 across 70 theaters. In Cincinnati, Ohio and other cities, the movie was released as Homecoming Night.

=== Home video ===
The film was released on VHS and Laserdisc in 1986 by HBO/Cannon Video. Some of these feature the theatrical ending only.

The DVD and Blu-ray was released on October 27, 2009, by Sony Pictures Home Entertainment and contain the original ending along with some special features. Scream Factory re-released it on Blu-ray on June 18, 2019 with extra special features.

== Reception ==
Rotten Tomatoes, a review aggregator, reports that 75% of 24 critics gave the film a positive review. Metacritic, which uses a weighted average, assigned the film a score of 62 out of 100, based on 8 critics, indicating "generally favorable" reviews. Nina Darnton wrote that the film, though derivative, "shows a fair ability to create suspense, build tension and achieve respectable performances." Nigel Floyd of Time Out London wrote that the direction and special effects are poor, but the film is still "enjoyable enough in a ramshackle sort of way." Michael Gingold of Fangoria rated it 3.5/4 stars and called it "one of the year's most surprisingly entertaining fright features, one that homaged practically every subgenre imaginable, yet kept a sure hand on its tone and never descended into spoofery." Steve Barton of Dread Central rated it 5/5 stars and called it "a classic in every sense of the word." Christopher Monfette of IGN rated it 7/10 and wrote that the film "shows its age" but is scary, gory, and has plenty of quotable lines. Nathan Rabin of The A.V. Club rated it C+ and wrote, "Night Of The Creeps has all the ingredients of a top-notch cult movie, yet Dekker too often ends up recycling clichés rather than subverting or spoofing them." Scott Weinberg of Fearnet wrote that the film is not for everyone, but it is "horror nerd nirvana". Eric Profancik of DVD Verdict called it "a great flick that deserves its cult status".

Later director Fred Dekker said: "It’s an odd movie. Nobody ever sets out to make a cult movie, but there are movies a wide audience will immediately take to, and there’s Night of the Creeps which is a strange mish-mash of detective story, horror movie, romance, science fiction and comedy. But that’s what special about it. At the end of the day I’m pleased with it. I pulled it off"^

=== Accolades ===
Dekker received a special award for his first-time direction at the 1987 Paris International Festival of Fantastic and Science-Fiction Film.

== Unofficial sequel ==
Zombie Town was marketed in some regions as a sequel, being alternatively titled Night of the Creeps 2: Zombie Town in Germany.

== See also ==
- List of zombie films
- Shivers
- Critters
- Slither
