= Dark Horizons =

Australian entertainment news website

- Website type: Film
- Available in: English
- Owner: Garth Franklin
- Creator: Garth Franklin
- Website: darkhorizons.com
- Launched: 1997
- Current status: Active

Dark Horizons is an Australian website focused on film, television and videogames.

The site was launched on 10 January 1997 and was nominated for a Webby Award for film in 1999. Dark Horizons is owned and written by Garth Franklin of Sydney, New South Wales, who is a "top critic" on Rotten Tomatoes and is a member of the Australian Film Critics Association.
