= Not Quite Human (film series) =

Film series article

- Official film series logo
- Based on: Not Quite Human by Seth McEvoy
- Teleplay by: Alan Ormsby (1); Eric Luke (2–3)
- Directed by: Steven H. Stern (1); Eric Luke (2–3)
- Starring: Jay Underwood; Alan Thicke; Robyn Lively
- Composers: Tom Scott (1); Michel Rubini (2); John Debney (3)
- Country of origin: United States
- Original language: English

Production
- Executive producers: Steven H. Stern (1); Noel Resnick (2–3)
- Producers: Noel Resnick (1); James Margellos (2–3)
- Cinematography: Ken Lamkin (1); Jules Brenner (2); Ron Orieux (3)
- Editors: Ron Wisman (1); David Berlatsky (2–3)
- Running time: 272 minutes
- Production companies: Sharmhill Productions (1); Walt Disney Television (1–3); Resnick / Margellos Productions (2)

Original release
- Network: ABC
- Release: June 19, 1987
- Network: Disney Channel
- Release: September 23, 1989 – May 31, 1992

The Not Quite Human television film series consists of American family-comedy science fiction films. The plot of the films center around the creation of a humanoid robot, who becomes a valued family member to its creator, while also learning to navigate the complicated circumstances of the human experience.

The films were met with mixed reception, citing their inferior quality to The Walt Disney Company's other science-fiction comedies (such as Flubber), while acknowledging that the films were created with the studio's attempt at a similar genre for contemporary audiences. Conversely, one critic praised the exploration of human experiences through the lens of science fiction.

== Films ==
Film	U.S. airdate	Director	Screenwriter	Producers
Not Quite Human	June 19, 1987	Steven H. Stern	Alan Ormsby	Noel Resnick
Not Quite Human 2	September 23, 1989	Eric Luke	Eric Luke	James Margellos
Still Not Quite Human	May 31, 1992	Eric Luke	Eric Luke	James Margellos

=== Not Quite Human (1987) ===
When a scientific inventor named Dr. Jonas Carson creates an android teenager named Chip, the lives of he and his daughter Becky are changed forever. Hoping to integrate his invention into society seamlessly, Chip goes to school with Becky to interact with other people. Chip successfully begins to experience the day-to-day functions of a human life, while navigating the awkward and difficult activities as well. As Chip continues his high schooling activities, a former employer of Dr. Carson's discovers Chip's true nature and determines to pursue monetary gains through abducting him and reprograming his functions into a military program. Together, Dr. Carson and Becky seek to end his plans, with determination to keep Chip as the newest adopted member of their family.

=== Not Quite Human 2 (1989) ===
After Chip successfully graduates from high school, he expresses interest in experiencing the next step of human life through college. Though his father Dr. Jonas Carson is apprehensive, Becky helps to support Chip's next ambition. Before leaving for college, the android downloads some new software that is intended to make his facial expressions more natural. After some of the university's experiences, he begins to miss his family as he has started to have some momentary malfunctions caused from glitches within his programming. Calling to notify his family, Dr. Carson encourages Chip to pursue his interests and so he determines ask out a girl he has been romantically interested in. Upon doing so, he is pleased to find out that she too is android named Roberta. She explains that her creator does not allow her to have free will. While helping to change her program, Roberta gains independence and the pair become a couple. After discovering that she is no longer responding to vocal commands, the people that developed her set in motion plans to retrieve her; while the Carsons also discover that the software Chip had downloaded, included malicious software that will over time completely destroy his internal systems. As the family races to find him before it's too late, Chip and Roberta are on the run from her creators, all while the androids search for a charging station before Roberta's power completely depletes erasing her memory.

=== Still Not Quite Human (1992) ===
Dr. Jonas Carson and his adopted android son named Chip attend a robotics convention, where Carson intends to present an inferior model to the world to showcase an advanced computer chip. When this robot begins to malfunction during the presentation, Dr. Carson accepts the ridicule and refuses Chip's suggestion that they reveal his true nature to protect his son. As they prepare to return home, Dr. Carson is abducted by a dubious individual and replaced with an android version. Though it is designed to function as Dr. Carson, Chip quickly discerns what has happened and reprograms the android to make its own choices. Finding an ally in the android, he renames it Bonus. Working together the two androids seek the help of local law enforcement to find and rescue Dr. Jonas Carson, who was taken by some wealthy competitive investors. While they begin to implement their rescue plan they also discover that another scientist had been developing a military war-android prototype, with the other scientists needing the assistance of Dr. Jonas to complete their creations, though he refuses to help them. When their military prototype android activates, Chip must use his brilliant programming functions to protect those around him and to rescue his father.

== Main cast and characters ==
List indicator

This section includes characters who will appear or have appeared in the franchise in main roles.

- An empty grey cell indicates the character was not in the film, or that the character's official presence has not yet been confirmed.

Character	Films		
Character	Not Quite Human	Not Quite Human 2	Still Not Quite Human
Chip Carson	Jay Underwood	Jay Underwood	Jay Underwood
Dr. Jonas Carson	Alan Thicke	Alan Thicke	Alan Thicke
Becky Carson	Robyn Lively	Robyn Lively	
Erin Jeffries	Kristy Swanson		
Gordon Vogel	Joseph Bologna		
J.J. Derks	Robert Harper		
Roberta		Katie Barberi	
Dr. Phil Masters		Greg Mullavey	
Prof. Victoria Gray		Dey Young	
Bonus Carson			Alan Thicke
Kyle Roberts			Adam Phillipson
Off. Kate Morgan			Rosa Nevin
Dr. Frederick Berrigon			Christopher Neame
Aunt Mildred			Betsy Palmer

== Additional crew and production details ==
Film	Crew/Detail					
Film	Composer	Cinematographer	Editor	Production companies	Distributing companies	Running time
Not Quite Human	Tom Scott	Ken Lamkin	Ron Wisman	Walt Disney Television, Sharmhill Productions	Buena Vista Pictures, American Broadcasting Company (ABC)	1 hr 37 mins
Not Quite Human 2	Michel Rubini	Jules Brenner	David Berlatsky	Walt Disney Television, Resnick/Margellos Productions	Buena Vista Pictures, Disney Channel	1 hr 31 mins
Still Not Quite Human	John Debney	Ron Orieux	David Berlatsky	Walt Disney Pictures, Walt Disney Productions	Buena Vista Pictures, Disney Channel	1 hr 24 mins

== Reception ==
=== Critical and public response ===
Film	Rotten Tomatoes
Not Quite Human	TBD (1 review)
Not Quite Human 2	—N/a
Still Not Quite Human	TBD (2 reviews)
