= List of science fiction television programs, N =

This is an inclusive list of science fiction television programs whose names begin with the letter N.

== N ==
Live-action

- Návštěvníci a.k.a. The Visitors (1983–2005, Czechoslovakia)
- Neighbors, The (2012–2014)
- Neverwhere (1996)
- New People, The (1969–1970)
- Nick Fury: Agent of S.H.I.E.L.D. (1998, film)
- Nightflyers (2018)
- Night Gallery (1970–1973, anthology)
- Night Man (1997–1999)
- Night Stalker (franchise):
  - Night Stalker (2005–2006, Kolchak: The Night Stalker remake)
  - Kolchak: The Night Stalker (1974–1975)
- Night Visions (2001, anthology)
- Nightmare Cafe (1992)
- Nightmare Man, The (1981, UK)
- Nineteen Eighty-Four (1954, UK, film)
- No Ordinary Family (2010–2011)
- Not Quite Human (franchise):
  - Not Quite Human (1987, film)
  - Not Quite Human II (1989, film)
  - Still Not Quite Human (1992, film)
- Not with a Bang (1990, UK)
- Now and Again (1999–2000)
- Nowhere Man (1995–1996)

Animation

- Nadesico (franchise):
  - Martian Successor Nadesico a.k.a. Mobile Battleship Nadesico a.k.a. Nadesico (1996–1997, Japan, animated)
  - Gekiganger III (1996–1997, Japan, clips within Martian Successor Nadesico, animated)
- Nadia: The Secret of Blue Water (franchise):
  - Nadia: The Secret of Blue Water a.k.a. Fushigi no Umi no Nadia (1990–1991, Japan, animated)
  - Nadia: The Secret of Fuzzy (1992, Japan, animated, film)
- Nanoboy (franchise):
  - New Adventures of Nanoboy, The (2009–2010, Canada/Singapore, animated)
  - Nanoboy: Hero on the Run (2011, Canada/US, sequel, film, animated)
- NASCAR Racers (1999–2001, animated)
- Needless (2009, Japan, animated)
- Neon Genesis Evangelion (1995–1996, Japan, animated)
- New Adventures of Ocean Girl, The (2000–2001, Australia, animated)
- New Captain Scarlet (2005, UK, animated)
- NieA 7 a.k.a. NieA under 7 (2000, Japan, animated)
- Ninja Senshi Tobikage a.k.a. Ninja Robot Tobikage a.k.a. Ninja Robots (US) (1985–1986, Japan, animated)
- Noein a.k.a. Noein: To Your Other Self (2005–2006, Japan, animated)
- Now and Then, Here and There (1999–2000, Japan, animated)
