= Michael Kennedy (director) =

Canadian film and television director

- Born: Kensington, Prince Edward Island
- Occupations: Director, screenwriter, actor, cinematographer,
- Website: https://www.michaelkennedydirector.com/bio

Michael Kennedy is a Canadian film and television director, writer, actor and cinematographer.

Kennedy was born in Kensington, Prince Edward Island. Kennedy lives in Mississauga with his wife.

Kennedy was a professor of Film and Television at York University, Toronto (1980-83), Jamia Milia Islamia University, New Delhi (1983-84), and Sheridan College, Toronto (2004-2021).

In 2023,Toronto Metropolitation University inducted Kennedy as a Visionary to their Image Arts Wall of Fame.

== Career ==
Kennedy has directed more than 20 feature-length films/TV movies and over 230 prime-time drama and comedy television episodes including the entire first season of the sitcom Little Mosque on the Prairie, that used humour to attack racism against Muslims in the post-911 world.

He has directed the first episodes filmed and/or aired of Delmer and Marta, My Life and a Movie, North/South, The Good Germany, Mental Block, Listen Missy, Screech Owls, P.R., Taking the Falls, and Jets. He was also one of the directors of the comedy series The Kids in the Hall, and directed 14 episodes of Made in Canada.

Kennedy has directed feature films in various countries: Jets was filmed in Germany and the US, Broken Lullaby in Budapest, One Man Out in Mexico, Caribe in Belize, Calculated Risk in Germany, and many others in his native Canada.

As well as directing, Kennedy also wrote the screenplays for films he directed, including Caribe, One Man Out, and The Swordsman. He has also occasionally participated in films as an actor .

In 2016 he directed #Roxy, a film adaptation of Cyrano de Bergerac released in 2018. In 2023, he directed the romantic comedy feature How to Fall in Love By the Holidays, starring Teri Hactcher.

== Filmography ==
=== Director ===
- Jim and Muggins Tour Toronto (1978), documentary short; debut film
- Caribe (1987)
- Erik (One Man Out) (1989)
- The Kids in the Hall (9 episodes, 1991–1992)
- Talons of the Eagle (1992)
- The Swordsman (1992)
- Broken Lullaby (1994) (TV)
- Red Scorpion 2 (1994)
- Hard Evidence (1995)
- The Possession of Michael D. (1995) (TV)
- Taking the Falls (2 episodes, 1995)
- Joe's Wedding (1996)
- Robin of Locksley (1996) (TV)
- Hostile Force (1996)
- Calculate Risk (1997) (TV)
- Little Men (1 episode, 1999)
- The Hoop Life (1999) TV series (unknown episodes)
- So Weird (2 episodes, 1999)
- JETS - Leben am Limit (1999) (TV)
- Wind at My Back (2 episodes, 2000)
- The City (1 episode, 2000)
- P.R. (7 episodes, 2000–2001)
- Murder Among Friends (2001) (TV)
- Screech Owls (2 episodes, 2001)
- Emily of New Moon (6 episodes, 1998–2002)
- Blackfly (7 episodes, 2001–2002)
- Rideau Hall (2 episodes, 2002)
- Made in Canada (13 episodes, 1999–2003)
- Mental Block (9 episodes, 2003–2004)
- Metropia (10 episodes, 2005–2006)
- North/South (5 episodes, 2006)
- G-Spot (6 episodes, 2006)
- The Smart Woman Survival Guide (3 episodes, 2007)
- This Space for Rent (2 episodes, 2007)
- Lost and Found (2009)
- Pure Pwnage (2 episodes, 2010)
- The Good Company (1 episode, 2010)
- Little Mosque on the Prairie (37 episodes, 2007–2011)
- She's the Mayor (2 episodes, 2011)
- What's Up Warthogs! (14 episodes, 2011–2012)
- That's So Weird! (7 episodes, 2011–2012)
- Really Me (2 episodes, 2012)
- Walter! (52 short films, 2011 and 2013)
- Greenpeace Greenwash Campaign (3 web shorts, 2013)
- Odd Squad (2 episodes, 2014)
- Annedroids (5 episodes, 2014)
- Heaven Must Be Boring! (pilot, 2014)
- Delmer and Marta (pilot and entire first season, 2014–15)
- Good Witch (2 episodes, 2017)
- Tale of Two Hearts, Good Witch (2018)
- #Roxy (2018)
- My Favourite Christmas Melody (2021)
- Write Place Write Time (2022)
- Six Degrees of Santa (2022)
- Lease On Love (2022)
- Zarqa, Director Mentor only (2022)
- A Match in Manhattan (2023)
- Christmas on the Alpaca Farm (2023)
- How to Fall in Love By the Holidays (2023), feature film starring Teri Hatcher

=== Writer ===
- Caribe (1987) (uncredited)
- Degrassi Junior High (1 episode, 1988)
- One Man Out (1989)
- The Swordsman (1992)
- JETS - Leben am Limit (1 episode, 1999)

=== Actor ===
- These Foolish Things (1977) as Wilson
- Trailer Park Boys – Reggie (2017–2018)

=== Cinematographer ===
- These Foolish Things (1977)

== Awards and nominations ==
=== Awards ===
- 2002 Directors Guild of Canada Award for Made in Canada ‘Creative Bookkeeping’ comedy TV series
- 2003 Directors Guild of Canada Award for Outstanding Achievement in a Television Series – Comedy: Made in Canada ‘Beaver Creek Valentine’
- 2014 “Marty Award” for “greatest achievement in the Mississauga Arts Sector,” in the category Media Arts, Established Artist
- 2018 Toronto Metropolitan University G. Raymond Chang Outstanding Volunteer Award for “profoundly influential” TMU alumni

=== Nominations ===
- Nomination at the 1996 Director Guild of America Awards - Children's program for Robin of Locksley
- Nomination for Best director of a TV series at the 2020 Canadian Screen Awards

=== Collective awards ===
- Co-winner of a Gemini Special Award in 2007: Canada Award for promoting diversity in television for Little Mosque on the Prairie
