= It's Our Stuff =

- Genre: Variety
- Written by: Mark Sheckter; Bob Ezrin; Cliff Jones; Rick Sanders; Maribeth Solomon
- Theme music composer: Mark Shekter
- Opening theme: "Stuff"
- Country of origin: Canada
- Original language: English
- No. of seasons: 1

Production
- Producer: Dave Thomas
- Running time: 30 minutes

Original release
- Network: CBC Television
- Release: 30 June – 8 September 1969

Related
- The Good Company

It's Our Stuff is a Canadian music variety television program that aired on CBC Television in 1969.

== Premise ==
This series featured numerous new artists performing works of comedy, dance and music. Alan Thicke was a series regular. Doug Riley and Rick Wilkins provided musical arrangements, while music producer Bob Ezrin was a series writer. Some performers previously appeared on The Good Company (1968–1969) which was also produced by Dave Thomas and featured a similar concept.

== Scheduling ==
This half-hour series was broadcast on Mondays at 9:00 p.m. (Eastern) from 30 June to 8 September 1969.
