= Presson =

Presson is a surname. Notable people with the surname include:

- Jason Presson (born 1971), American actor
- Jay Presson Allen (1922–2006), American screenwriter, playwright, stage director, television producer and novelist
