= Eric Luke =

American writer (born 1956)

Eric Luke (born December 17, 1956, in Palo Alto, California) is an American writer and director, best known for writing the screenplay for Joe Dante's 1985 film Explorers.

== Career ==
=== Film ===
Eric Luke began his career in film writing. Previous film work included: Explorers for Paramount Pictures, numerous screenplays for MGM and others, and also wrote and directed the latter two films in the Not Quite Human trilogy for the Disney Channel. Also, he wrote a preliminary script for Jetsons: The Movie.

=== Television ===
Moving to television, he eventually wrote scripts for the Tales from the Cryptkeeper series and co-plotted the Gargoyles pilot five-parter for The Walt Disney Company. He returned to television to executive produce, story edit and script the Fox Kids TV animated series Xyber 9, which later aired on the Toon Disney channel. He would later write scripts for Teenage Mutant Ninja Turtles (2003).

=== Comics ===
His initial work in comics was Project: Overkill, a story drawn by artist Phill Norwood that appeared in Dark Horse Presents #30. Continuing with the Dark Horse Comics company, he then wrote the entire first series (1995–98) of Ghost, a run of 36 issues. He had also authored the Ghost Special during the summer of 1994. After Ghost ended, he moved onto the Wonder Woman series for DC Comics after his initial trial at writing that title's Annual #7 proved successful with editors.

=== Novels ===
His most recent work includes the novel Interference (2012) a meta-horror audiobook about an audiobook that kills, released free on iTunes.

=== Podcasts ===
Among his current projects is the podcast Extruding America, a deadpan satire in the style of Bob and Ray.

== Filmography ==
=== Television ===
- Tales from the Cryptkeeper (1993–1994)
- Gargoyles (1994)
- Ultraforce (1995)
- Extreme Dinosaurs (1997)
- Xyber 9: New Dawn (1999): story editor
- Teenage Mutant Ninja Turtles (2003–2004)

=== Film ===
- Explorers (1985)
- Not Quite Human II (1989)
- Still Not Quite Human (1992)

== Bibliography ==
=== Dark Horse Comics ===
- Ghost #1–36, Special #1 (1995–1998)

Preceded by n/a	Ghost writer 1995–1998	Succeeded by Chris Warner
Preceded by John Byrne	Wonder Woman writer 1998–2000	Succeeded by Phil Jimenez
