= Caribe (1987 film) =

- Directed by: Michael Kennedy
- Written by: Paul Donovan
- Produced by: Nicolas Stiliadis
- Starring: John Savage
- Cinematography: Ludek Bogner
- Music by: Mychael Danna
- Release date: 1987
- Language: English

Caribe is a 1987 Canadian adventure-thriller film directed by Michael Kennedy and starring John Savage, Kara Glover and Stephen McHattie.

== Plot ==
Two CIA agents, a man and a woman, find themselves entangled in an arms trafficking ring in Belize. They arrange the purchase of a large shipment of weapons with the intention of keeping the money. The man they're dealing with, however, has another plan: to kill one of the agents and enjoy the money.

== Cast ==
- John Savage as Jeff Richardson
- Kara Glover as Helen Williams
- Stephen McHattie as Whitehale
- Sam Malkin as Roy Forbes
- Zack Nesis as Tommy Goff
- Paul Koslo as Mercenary
- Maury Chaykin as Captain Burdoch
- T.J. Scott as Stone
- Johnny Goar as Willy
- Lennox Penill as Foley
