= Explorers (film) =

1985 science fantasy film by Joe Dante

- Theatrical release poster
- Directed by: Joe Dante
- Written by: Eric Luke
- Produced by: David Bombyk; Edward S. Feldman
- Starring: Ethan Hawke; River Phoenix; Jason Presson
- Cinematography: John Hora
- Edited by: Tina Hirsch
- Music by: Jerry Goldsmith
- Distributed by: Paramount Pictures
- Release date: July 12, 1985
- Running time: 109 minutes
- Country: United States
- Language: English
- Budget: $20–25 million
- Box office: $9.9 million

Explorers is a 1985 American science fantasy film written by Eric Luke and directed by Joe Dante. The film stars Ethan Hawke and River Phoenix, both in their film debuts, and Jason Presson as young teenage boys who build a spacecraft to explore outer space. The special effects were produced by Industrial Light & Magic, with make-up effects by Rob Bottin.

Rushed into production, the film was never properly finished. Dante revealed that the studio demanded that he stop editing and rush for a July release where it was overshadowed by the Live Aid concert, which was held one day after the film's release and stiff competition from Back to the Future, which had opened nine days prior. It was a box office failure and received mixed reviews from critics upon its release, but it attracted a cult following with its VHS release.

== Plot ==
Ben Crandall is a young teenage boy living in a fictional Maryland suburb, who experiences vivid dreams about flying through clouds and over a vast, city-like circuit board, usually after falling asleep watching old sci-fi films. Upon waking from the dream, he draws a diagram of the circuit board and shows the sketches to his friend, child prodigy Wolfgang Muller. At school, Ben develops a crush on Lori Swenson but is unsure whether it is mutual. The boys also befriend punkish-but-likable Darren Woods, with whom they share their circuit-board concepts. Wolfgang builds an actual microchip based on Ben's drawings. The chip enables the generation of an electromagnetic bubble which surrounds a pre-determined area. The boys discover that the bubble is capable of moving at near-limitless distances and speeds without ill effects from inertia. Due to Darren’s connections at a local junkyard and his mechanical skills, the three boys construct a rudimentary spacecraft out of an abandoned Tilt-A-Whirl car and name it Thunder Road, after Bruce Springsteen's song of the same name.

After Ben receives more dreams about the circuit board, Wolfgang discovers a means of producing unlimited sustainable oxygen; this means longer flights, whereas previously they were limited to whatever a typical oxygen tank could hold. They finalize their plan to explore the galaxy in search of alien life. The boys complete lift-off, despite interference from the authorities (one who silently wishes them well). Shortly after breaking Earth's orbit, something overrides the boys' personal computer-controls. Thunder Road is beamed light-years away into deep space and is tractor-beamed aboard a much larger spaceship. The boys venture out to meet their "captors", Wak and Neek: two aliens whose knowledge of Earth comes almost entirely from pop culture, particularly TV reruns.

The young explorers hit it off with their alien hosts, but then the alien ship is suddenly intercepted by a larger alien ship. Wak urges the boys to leave. They are in the process of doing so when they are interrupted by a gigantic alien who admonishes Wak and Neek. It is revealed that Wak and Neek are brother and sister, and the gigantic creature is their father; they have taken his ship out for a "joy ride", sending the dreams to the boys in the hopes of meeting humans. Transmissions of old movies have kept the alien populace at a distance – except for the curious Wak and Neek – due to the way humans depict violence toward alien life.

Wak and Neek's father allows Thunder Road and its crew to depart, after Wak and Neek give the boys a parting gift: an amulet, which, according to the aliens, is "the stuff dreams are made of." The boys make it safely back to Earth, but a malfunction results in them crashing Thunder Road into a lake. A week later, Ben has a dream at school in which he envisions another vast circuit board while flying through more clouds overhead. This time – thanks to Wak and Neek's amulet – Ben is joined in the dream by Wolfgang, Darren, and Lori. They note the circuitry's complexity and speculate where it may take them once completed. Lori smiles at Ben while holding his hand, and they share a kiss while flying.

== Cast ==
- Ethan Hawke as Benjamin "Ben" Crandall
- River Phoenix as Wolfgang Müller
- Jason Presson as Darren Woods
- Amanda Peterson as Lori Swenson
- Dick Miller as Charlie Drake
- Robert Picardo as Starkiller / Wak / Wak and Neek's Father
- Leslie Rickert as Neek
- James Cromwell as Mr. Müller
- Dana Ivey as Mrs. Müller
- Bobby Fite as Steve Jackson
- Meshach Taylor as Gordon Miller
- John P. Navin Jr. as Man at Drive-In
- Brooke Bundy as Science Teacher
- Taliesin Jaffe as Ludwig Müller
- Karen Mayo-Chandler as Carla
- Mary Kay Place as Mrs. Crandall
- Mary Hillstead as Woman at Drive-In

== Production ==
=== Development ===
A rumor persists that the script for Explorers had been circulating Hollywood offices for years before it was made, and that it was bought by the studio because a scene of "children flying through the sky on bicycles" appealed to Steven Spielberg for his film E.T. the Extra-Terrestrial. The film was originally to be directed by Wolfgang Petersen having initially impressed Paramount executives with his family-targeted The NeverEnding Story. Petersen wanted to film it in his native Germany. The studio decided to settle in the States with an American director and Petersen was not long after commissioned by 20th Century Fox to take over the production of Enemy Mine. "The funny thing about it is that when I was first given the script, I was coming off Gremlins and in a rare point in my career I was like 'hey, let's get this guy,'" said Dante during a Q&A and screening of the film in 2008. Dante liked what he read but did not feel there was a third act. "At the end when the kids went to the planet, they go and play baseball. That was the plot. It seemed that wasn't quite enough." While discussing the script with Paramount executives, they said "we can work on it while we're making the picture." Dante and the writer, Eric Luke, were "improvising what they were going to do" while the film was being made.

=== Casting ===
Both Hawke and Phoenix make their feature film debuts. Phoenix, who had grown up in communes in South America, was somewhat unfamiliar with popular culture of North America. During rehearsals it became a running joke when he would attempt scripted well-known words and phrases and pronounce them incorrectly. Phoenix was originally considered to play Darren, but when Dante chose Jason Presson to play him, Dante thought he was good enough to play another role so he cast him against type as the nerdy Wolfgang. Cherie Currie was considered for a part but, according to her autobiography, she was in the throes of drug dependency and could not even make it to a meeting.

=== Production ===
"The studio changed hands in the middle of production, and they decided they needed the movie much quicker than we thought," said Dante. "So we shot the picture under very hurried auspices [sic]. The paint on the sets was literally wet and when the kids stepped into the spaceship they sunk into cement because it wasn't dry."' During the dreams when the children fly over the circuit board, some of the camera angles and moves are meant to mimic the flight to Neverland from Peter Pan. When Robert Picardo was in full makeup and costume as the aliens, Wak and his father, his mouth was the only part of him not completely covered (though his mouth was made up to blend in with the faces of the creatures). Industrial Light & Magic was responsible for the special effects, which required 6 million dollars of the budget.

"We came up with sort of a pop culture angle on it, that we thought would be funny... audiences didn't particularly," said Dante. The film contains various references to science fiction features, new and old, and much more when the children meet the aliens. When the boys are hovering over the drive-in, the film that is playing stars a space hero named Starkiller, named after George Lucas' original last name for Luke Skywalker, and the sound effects from the movie are from the Atari video game Yars' Revenge. Hawke's character, Ben, is obsessed with aliens and movies surrounding them, and the two movies he watches during the film are This Island Earth and The War of the Worlds. The children attend the "Charles M. Jones Junior High School", named after Looney Tunes director Chuck Jones, and Wak the alien's first exchange of dialogue is of Bugs Bunny's famous catchphrase. The song Wak performs for the kids is Little Richard's "All Around the World". One character is a pet rat (trained to use a voice synthesizer) named Heinlein. While the film uses the original recording, the soundtrack album included a re-recorded remix performed by Robert Palmer.

=== Post-production ===
Dante and his editing team submitted a rough cut by the late spring of 1985, but Paramount wanted to take advantage of the busy summer market. They changed the initial release date of late August to early July. "They said "just stop editing the picture, we're gonna put it out, and we got a perfect date for it and we know it'll make a lot of money," said Dante. There was about an hour and a half worth of footage that was left on the cutting room floor. "There was a lot of spiritual kind of stuff in the movie that didn't make it in at all," Dante said. "There's a theory that was around at the time about the world mind and it was a concept I thought was interesting. We started to get into it and there was no way to make any sense out of it, so we just dumped all that. Now the only picture where that theory is even mentioned is Exorcist II unfortunately." Sequences had to be re-dubbed, including one near the end where the boys are under a tree, to give the film a sense of closure. In the drive-in scene of the young couple, the boy who calls the special effects "fake" is supposed to be Ben's brother. Dante says, "there was a whole family sub-plot that is completely missing." The character Gordon Miller was also supposed to return in the third act.

== Release ==
=== Box office ===
Explorers was released on July 12, 1985 in 1,750 theaters, which turned out to be the same weekend as when the Live Aid concert was being broadcast. Back to the Future had also opened the previous week on July 3 (Wednesday) and dominated the summer. Explorers suffered badly its opening weekend and afterwards quickly disappeared. By the end of its run in theaters, it earned $9,873,044. When the Los Angeles Times compared the film with other commercial failures that summer, a Paramount executive responded, "here was a wonderful piece of material. But by the time it came out, you felt as though you'd already seen it." Many of the international markets released the film later in December of the same year.

== Reception ==
The film fared better in video rentals and cable broadcasts and garnered mixed reviews from critics. Kevin Thomas of the Los Angeles Times said, "Explorers itself is bubble-thin, but it glides by gracefully on the charm of its three young heroes and their vividly envisioned adventure in space." "Of all the Spielberg-inspired fantasy films afoot at the moment, Explorers is by far the most eccentric. It's charmingly odd at some moments, just plain goofy at others," said Janet Maslin in her review for The New York Times.

The film holds a 48% rating on Rotten Tomatoes, based on 104 reviews. The site's consensus states, "Despite dazzling effects, a terrific young cast, and tons of charm, Explorers fails to soar past its '80s kiddie flick competitors." Metacritic gave the film a score of 58 based on 14 reviews, indicating "mixed or average" reviews.

=== Cult recognition ===
Over time, Explorers has gained a cult following among fans of Dante's work, as well as science fiction fans and those who feel it is an overall family-friendly film.

Dante reflected on the film by saying that he is appreciative of the warm reception it has earned over the years, but continued by saying "the problem is for me is that the movie you'll see is not the movie I wanted to make. It's the movie I got to make up to a certain point and then had to stop. It's hard for me to look at it, cause it's not the film I quite had in mind." The missing and cut scenes are presumably lost, as Dante tried searching for them without success. Some of the home video releases would be slightly recut to remove two scenes, where Wolfgang has an encounter with Steve Jackson and his gang of bullies and a brief bit where the boys chase the Tilt-a-Whirl ride after they push it up a hill. These two scenes were reinstated when it was added to Netflix. A brief sequence at the end where Ben daydreams about the Thunder Road restored and in the classroom was also added in some of the home video releases. Originally before the end credits, in the theatrical cut, the alien Wak "broke the fourth wall" and remarked on people who were still in the theater from the smell of popcorn. In the re-edited home video version, he just tells another joke before it cuts to the closing credits.

== Novelization ==
A novelization of the film was written by George Gipe.

== Soundtrack ==
The film's original score was composed and conducted by Jerry Goldsmith and performed by the Hollywood Studio Symphony. An album was released on MCA featuring selections from his score plus three songs (including "All Around the World" as performed by Robert Palmer; the Little Richard version is heard in the film).

1. The Construction (2:25)
2. Sticks and Stones (2:03)
3. No Air (2:24)
4. Less Than Perfect - Red 7 (4:06)
5. The Bubble (1:43)
6. First Flight (2:45)
7. This Boy Needs to Rock - Night Ranger (3:57)
8. All Around the World - Robert Palmer (2:18)
9. Free Ride (3:33)
10. Fast Getaway (4:47)
11. She Likes Me (2:28)
12. Have a Nice Trip (7:54)

The album was later reissued by Varèse Sarabande on cd and cassette, with the score selections first and then the songs where separated to the end of the cd and cassette.

In 2011, Intrada Records released the complete score.

1. Main Title (Unused Version with "Wak's Boogie") (:51)
2. Main Title (Film Version) (:47)
3. The First Dream (:58)
4. Sticks and Stones (2:23)
5. Lori/Intervention (:50)
6. Home (2:10)
7. The Bubble (1:47)
8. "Sci-Fi" Flick/The Roof-Top (2:04)
9. Crazed Bubble/Fuse Box (2:44)
10. Free Ride (3:43)
11. Peek-A-Boo (1:53)
12. The Prospect (1:40)
13. The Construction (2:35)
14. The Thunder Road (1:25)
15. First Flight (3:03)
16. No Air (2:34)
17. I Want to Live (1:42)
18. Time for Bed (1:36)
19. More Dreams/Dreams (1:45)
20. Let's Go (1:44)
21. Fast Getaway (4:58)
22. Wait Up (1:00)
23. The Spider (:56)
24. Alien Love Call (:57)
25. We Come in Peace (2:04)
26. She Likes Me (2:39)
27. Neek Chords (:19)
28. Looks Real (2:03)
29. Space Pirates (:32)
30. Gifts/Home Flight (5:21)
31. Have a Nice Trip (8:03)
32. Tannhäuser Overture [Excerpt] - Richard Wagner (4:04)
33. Space Movie - Alexander Courage (3:02)

== Possible remake ==
According to The Hollywood Reporter in 2014, Paramount was developing a remake of Explorers through their now defunct low-budget label Insurge Pictures written by Geoff Moore and Dave Posamentier and produced by Josh Appelbaum and Andre Nemec. The remake was said to be similar in tone to the Michael Bay–produced Project Almanac. As of 2018, Cary Fukunaga and David Lowery were reportedly working on the pilot for a new adaptation of the film.
