= Robin of Locksley (film) =

1996 American television film

- Poster
- Written by: Larry Sugar; William T. Conway (uncredited)
- Directed by: Michael Kennedy
- Starring: Devon Sawa; Sarah Chalke; Joshua Jackson
- Music by: John Welsman
- Countries of origin: United States; Canada
- Original language: English

Production
- Producers: Rosanne Milliken; Larry Sugar
- Cinematography: Mark Irwin
- Editor: Bill Goddard
- Running time: 97 minutes
- Production companies: Hallmark Entertainment; Sugar Entertainment; All Media inc

Original release
- Release: February 26, 1996

Robin of Locksley is a 1996 television movie directed by Michael Kennedy. It stars Devon Sawa, Joshua Jackson and Sarah Chalke.

== Plot ==
Robin McAllister (Devon Sawa) and his family win the lottery and they end up moving from Kansas City to Seattle where Robin attends Locksley Academy, a wealthy private school. While there Robin comes up with a plan to help one of his friends who was hurt and needs money for an operation by robbing from John Prince Sr., the head of a very wealthy corporation. Robin becomes friends with a couple of misfits at school named Will Scarlett (Billy O'Sullivan) and Little John (Tyler Labine) and also falls for a girl named Marian (Sarah Chalke) who helps train the horses that Robin's family has. While helping out his friends Robin becomes an enemy of John Prince Jr. (Joshua Jackson), the big shot rich kid at school and his friends Warner and Gibson who are also the sons of rich parents. Then Robin goes to join the archery team but is not allowed to because of John Prince Jr. so he starts his own team and his 2 friends join and learn from Robin. McAllister has to outsmart FBI agent Walter Nottingham and help take down the richest kids in the school during the rest of the movie.

== Cast ==
- Devon Sawa as Robin McAllister
- Sarah Chalke as Marion Fitzwater
- Joshua Jackson as John Prince, Jr.
- Billy O'Sullivan as Will Scarlett
- Tyler Labine as John Little
- Robert Thurston as Dean Harvey
- Tom Butler as John Prince, Sr.
- Alf Humphreys as Grant McAllister
- Elizabeth Savenkoff as Janet McAllister
- Colin Cunningham as FBI Agent Walter Nottingham
- James Bell as Father Tuck

== Production ==
St. George's junior School in Vancouver was used as the setting for Locksley Academy.

== Reception ==
Robin of Locksley was nominated for two awards. One Directors Guild of America Award for "Outstanding Directorial Achievement in Children's Programs" and one Leo Awards for "Best Overall Sound – Feature Film" for William Butler.
