= Tahiti Village =

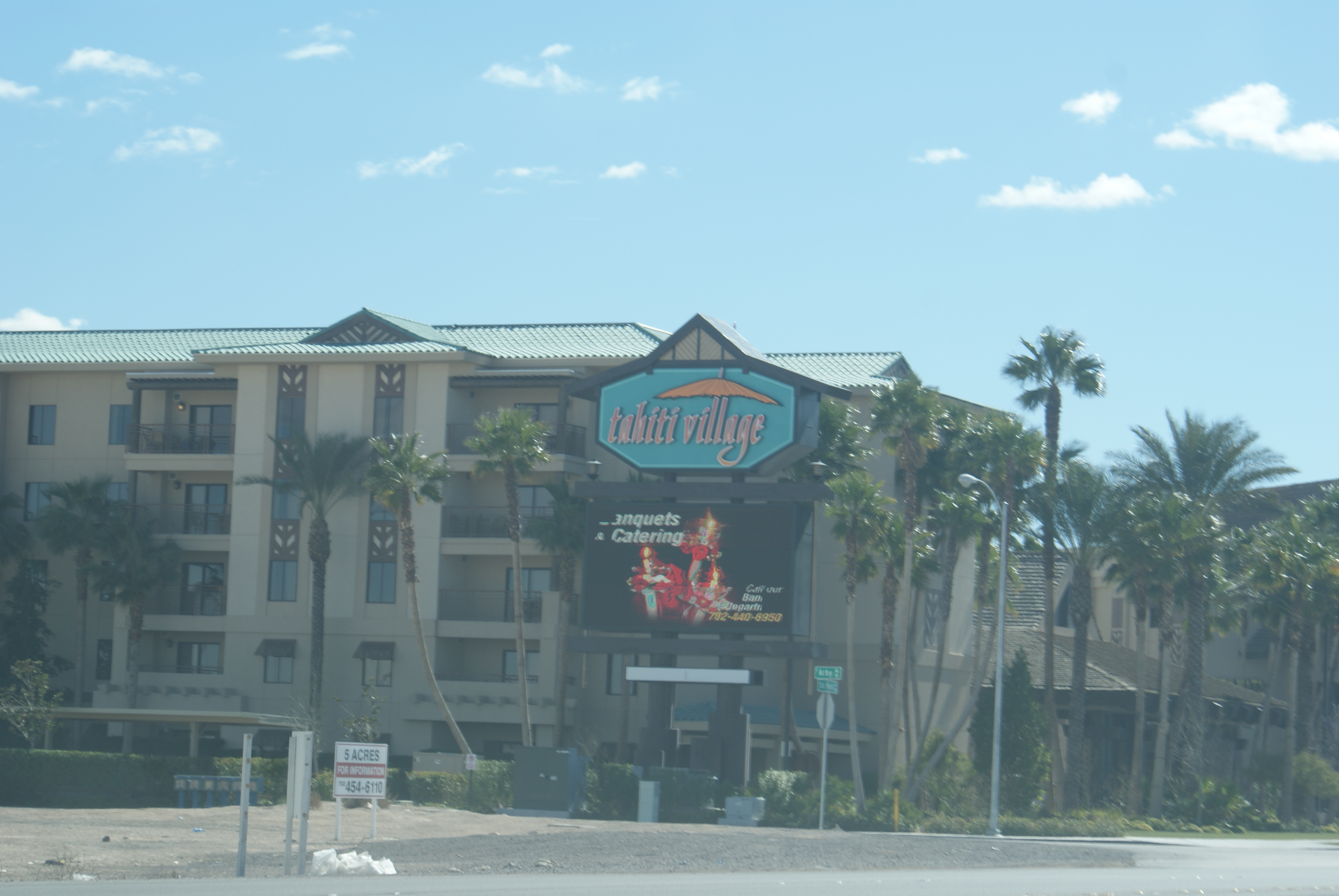
- Interactive map of the Tahiti Village area

General information
- Status: Completed
- Type: Timeshare
- Location: Enterprise, Nevada, United States, 7200 South Las Vegas Boulevard
- Coordinates: 36.059696°N 115.171939°W
- Opened: 2006

Design and construction
- Developer: Consolidated Resorts Inc.
- Main contractor: Martin-Harris Construction

Website
- www.tahitivillage.com

Tahiti Village is a Tahitian-themed timeshare resort located on 27 acres (11 ha) of land at 7200 South Las Vegas Boulevard, south of the Las Vegas Strip, in Enterprise, Nevada.

== History ==
Tahiti Village was announced by Consolidated Resorts Inc. on March 7, 2003, as a $200 million 580-unit timeshare resort to be developed on 20 acres (8.1 ha) of land at the southeast corner of South Las Vegas Boulevard and Arby Avenue. Sales were expected to begin in July or August 2003, with groundbreaking expected to take place in September 2003.

Consolidated Resorts, which owned timeshares in Las Vegas and in Hawaii, planned to construct the resort in three or four phases, with the first phase scheduled for an August 2004 completion. The resort's buildings would range between two and eight stories. No casino was planned for inclusion on the property. The resort's appearance was to be similar to the Tahiti, another one of the company's timeshare projects in Las Vegas. By July 2004, the project was expected to feature a total of 975 units.

The $60 million first phase was topped off in September 2005, with the first three buildings standing five and six stories high and offering 154 two-bedroom units, with the potential to split them into 308 one-bedroom units. The six-story towers were scheduled for completion in March 2006. Additional towers, as high as 11 stories, were planned for the back portion of the 27-acre property. The timeshare was ultimately expected to feature 1,046 rooms, generating sales of more than $1.5 billion. Amenities included a 10,000 sq ft (930 m^{2}) pool and beach, as well as a lounge, concierge, and spa.

Michael Kaplan, chairman of Consolidated Resorts, said at the time, "We assembled 27 acres in the last three years and we had offers of two and three times what we paid for the land before we even started construction. I can't believe the value of the land out there. You look at that location, it's as close to the Strip as you can get." Tahiti Village's second phase began construction in September 2006, with a 10-story 284-unit tower. At that time, the resort was expected to ultimately feature 1,083 units. The second phase, consisting of three 10-story towers, was topped off in July 2007. The second phase also included a seven-story parking garage.

In 2007, Alan Thicke and Tanya Roberts appeared in a Tahiti Village infomercial titled Second Honeymoon, produced in the style of a game show featuring timeshare purchasers. Thicke also appeared in a 2007 television commercial for the resort. A Polynesian-themed restaurant, Tahiti Joe's, operated on the second floor of the resort.

In July 2009, Consolidated Resorts filed for bankruptcy. Operations at Tahiti Village continued despite the filing. In August 2010, Arthur Spector Companies acquired the remaining timeshare inventory and operating assets of Tahiti Village. In June 2014, Tahiti Village opened 17° South, a tropical-themed restaurant and bar, named after the Polynesian islands located 17 degrees south of the equator. In August 2014, the restaurant was opened to the public; restaurants at the resort were previously for guests only. In November 2014, the new Mahana Spa opened on the ninth floor of Tower Five.
