= Wallace Langham =

American actor (born 1965)

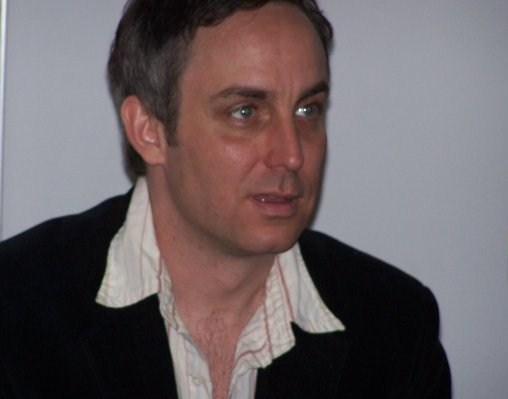
- Langham at Royal Victoria Dock, London in 2006
- Born: James Wallace Langham II; March 11, 1965 (age 61); Fort Worth, Texas, U.S.
- Other name: Wally Ward
- Occupation: Actor
- Years active: 1985–present
- Spouses: Laura Langham (m. 1986; div. 1998) Karey Richard (m. 2002; div. 2012) Melissa Voyagis (m. 2015)
- Children: 2 (with Laura)

James Wallace Langham II (born March 11, 1965) is an American actor. He is known for his roles in television shows, playing the role of Phil the Head Writer on The Larry Sanders Show (1992–1998), Josh Blair in Veronica's Closet (1997–2000), and as David Hodges on the crime drama television series CSI: Crime Scene Investigation (2000–2015), a role he would reprise in CSI: Vegas (2021). He began his career in 1985 under the stage name Wally Ward before reverting to his real name in 1989. He would have roles in films such as Weird Science, Michael, Daddy Day Care, Little Miss Sunshine, The Social Network and Ford v Ferrari, and make appearances in series such as ER, The West Wing, For All Mankind and Physical.

== Early and personal life ==
Langham was born on March 11, 1965, in Fort Worth, Texas, the son of Sunni, a costume designer, and James Langham, an elevator repairman.

In March 2000, Langham pleaded no contest to battery charges after beating a tabloid reporter and was ordered to serve three years' probation and to serve 450 hours of community service and to donate $10,000 to a registered nonprofit organization. In a statement, Langham said "[he] would have never attacked anyone had I not first been provoked".

== Film career ==
Langham got his start in the John Hughes film Weird Science (1985), as well as in The Invisible Kid and the ABC Afterschool Special entitled Just a Regular Kid: An AIDS Story, but later moved to roles as a young bigot in Soul Man and as a gang leader in The Chocolate War. He appeared in the Eddie Murphy comedy Daddy Day Care, and the critically acclaimed Little Miss Sunshine and The Social Network.

== Television career ==
Langham dropped the Ward moniker in the 1990s as he moved to more adult roles, appearing as a regular in the much-hyped but short-lived CBS series WIOU. His big breakthrough came when he was cast as Phil, the cynical staff and then head writer for insecure talk show host Larry Sanders, in HBO's sitcom The Larry Sanders Show. Langham then took on a role in NBC's Veronica's Closet, playing Kirstie Alley's gay assistant Josh. He then appeared on the Joan Cusack sitcom What About Joan?

He has guest-starred on many series including, Murphy Brown, NewsRadio, ER, Murder, She Wrote, Sex and the City, 21 Jump Street, Medium, both the 1985 and the 2002 versions of The Twilight Zone, The Outer Limits, Star Trek: Voyager, Curb Your Enthusiasm, Monk, Shameless, and Grace Under Fire.

He was the voice of Andy French on the animated series Mission Hill, as well as the Care-Bots and Smoltz in Buzz Lightyear of Star Command, Basil Karlo/Clayface in The Batman, Orm/Ocean Master in Batman: The Brave and the Bold, and Anarky in Beware the Batman.

Langham played lab technician David Hodges on the CBS series CSI: Crime Scene Investigation. Starting with the eighth-season premiere, Langham was listed in the main titles.

== Other work ==
Langham played Dr. Grant Seeker in the preshow of the theme park attraction Dinosaur at Disney's Animal Kingdom Park at Walt Disney World, in which his character attempts to send guests back in time to retrieve a live Iguanadon; his voice was also heard in the ride vehicle throughout the attraction. Dinosaur closed permanently on February 2, 2026.

== Filmography ==
=== Film ===
Year	Title	Role	Notes
1985	Weird Science	Art	Credited as Wally Ward
1986	Thunder Run	Paul	Credited as Wally Ward
1986	Soul Man	Barky Brewer	Credited as Wally Ward
1986	Combat Academy	Percival 'Percy' Barnett	Credited as Wally Ward
1987	Amazon Women on the Moon	Private Anson W. Pucket	Segment: "The Unknown Soldier"; uncredited
1988	The Invisible Kid	Milton McClane	Credited as Wally Ward
1988	Under the Boardwalk	Backwash	Credited as Wally Ward
1988	The Chocolate War	Archie	Credited as Wally Ward
1989	Martians Go Home	Voyeur Martian	Credited as Wally Ward
1990	Vital Signs	Gant	
1996	God's Lonely Man	Rick	
1996	Michael	Bruce Craddock	
1998	Dinosaur	Dr. Grant Seeker	Preshow
2001	On Edge	Jimmy Hand	
2003	Daddy Day Care	Jim Fields	
2004	Hot Night in the City	Jack	
2006	Little Miss Sunshine	Kirby	
2006	I Want Someone to Eat Cheese With	Claude Clochet	
2007	The Key	unknown	Direct-to-video
2008	The Great Buck Howard	Dan Green	
2008	Growing Op	Bryce	
2009	Triumph of Sparhusen	Bjorn Epstein	Short film
2010	The Bannen Way	Surveillance Tech	
2010	The Social Network	Peter Thiel	
2012	Ruby Sparks	Warren	
2012	Hitchcock	Saul Bass	
2012	Freeloaders	Swedish Car Enthusiast	
2013	Somewhere Slow	Paul	
2013	Rain from Stars	Andy	
2014	Transcendence	Dr. Strauss	
2014	Draft Day	Pete Begler	
2014	Buttwhistle	Mr. Confer	
2014	AJ's Infinite Summer	Danny/Guard	Voice, short film
2014	Taken 3	Mike	
2016	War Dogs	Vegas X Supplier	
2016	Spaceman	Bruce Lindsay	
2016	LBJ	Arthur Schlesinger	
2016	Closure	—N/a	Short film; director/producer
2017	Bob	Bob	Short film
2017	Battle of the Sexes	Henry	
2018	The Darkest Minds	Dr. Viceroy	
2019	Sophie's Quinceanera	Man	Short film
2019	Ford v Ferrari	Dr. Granger	
2021	Operation Varsity Blues: The College Admissions Scandal	Gordon Caplan	
2025	The Alto Knights	Senator Estes Kefauver	

=== Television ===
Year	Title	Role	Notes
1985	CBS Schoolbreak Special	Babe	Episode: "Ace Hits the Big Time"; Credited as Wally Ward
1985	The Best Times	Bill Skeezac	Episode: "Snake Meat"; Credited as Wally Ward
1985	Children of the Night	Kevin	Television film; credited as Wally Ward
1986	Fast Times	Mark Ratner	7 episodes; recurring role; credited as Wally Ward
1986	Combat High	Perry Bennett	Television film; credited as Wally Ward
1987	One House	Chris Houston	2 episodes; credited as Wally Ward
1987	The Twilight Zone	Nelson Baxley	Episode: "Time and Teresa Golowitz/Voices in the Earth"; Credited as Wally Ward
1987	ABC Afterschool Specials	Paul Hendler	Episode: "Just a Regular Kid: An AIDS Story"
1989	A Deadly Silence	Jimmy Pierson, Jr.	Television film; credited as Wally Ward
1989	Matlock	Dennis Austin	Episode: "The Cult"
1990	21 Jump Street	Poole	Episode: "Research and Destroy"
1990	Murphy Brown	Michael	Episode: "The Murphy Brown School of Broadcasting"
1990–1991	WIOU	Willis Teitlebaum	Series regular; 14 episodes
1992	Life Goes On	John Hemingway	Episode: "The Fairy Tale"
1992–1998	The Larry Sanders Show	Phil	Series regular; 89 episodes Nominated - Online Film & Television Association Award for Best Actor in a Cable Series
1993	Murder, She Wrote	Todd Merlin	Episode: "Dead to Rights"
1994	Madman of the People	Davis	Episode: "The Jack Buckner Story"
1994	Dave's World	Neil	Episode: "Family Membership"
1994	Life with Louie: A Christmas Surprise for Mrs. Stillman	Unknown	Voice, television short
1995	NewsRadio	Jeff	Episode: "Pilot"
1996	NewsRadio	Stewart	Episode: "Physical Graffiti"
1996	ER	Dr. Melvoin	Episode: "Doctor Carter, I Presume"
1997	Grace Under Fire	Eric Spencer	Episode: "Grace's New Job"
1997	F/X: The Series	Levi Chase	Episode: "Shooting Mickey"
1997–2000	Veronica's Closet	Josh Blair	Series regular; 67 episodes/ Director Episode: "Veronica's Clips"; Nominated - Online Film & Television Association Award for Best Supporting Actor in a Comedy Series
1998	Star Trek: Voyager	Flotter T. Water III	Episode: "Once Upon a Time"
1999	The Wild Thornberrys	Sven	Voice, episode: "Pal Joey"
1999–2002	Mission Hill	Andy French	Voice, main role (13 episodes)
2000	Happily Ever After: Fairy Tales for Every Child	Prince Bobby, Fish	Voice, episode: "The Frog Princess"
2000	Daydream Believers: The Monkees' Story	Don Kirshner	Television film
2000	The Outer Limits	Ezekiel, Daniel Faraday	Episode: "Final Appeal"
2000	Buzz Lightyear of Star Command	Care-bots	Voice, episode: "Speed Trap"
2000–2001	What About Joan?	Mark Ludlow	Series regular; 21 episodes
2001	Sister Mary Explains It All	Aloysius Benheim	Television film
2001	Inside Schwartz	A.J.	Episode: "Comic Relief Pitcher"
2002	The Twilight Zone	Charlie Stickney	Episode: "Mr. Motivation"
2003	Behind the Camera: The Unauthorized Story of 'Three's Company'	Jay Bernstein	Television film
2003	Sex and the City	Willy	Episode: "To Market, to Market"
2003	Las Vegas	Julian Kerbis	Episode: "Donny, We Hardly Knew Ye"
2003	Miss Match	Lucas	Episode: "Kate in Ex-tasy"
2003	Good Morning, Miami	Ken	Episode: "With Friends Like These, Who Needs Emmys?"
2003	Rubbing Charlie	unknown	Television film
2003–2015	CSI: Crime Scene Investigation	David Hodges	73 episodes; recurring role (seasons 3–7); series regular (seasons 8–15) Writer/Teleplay Episode: "Field Mice"
2004	Behind the Camera: The Unauthorized Story of 'Charlie's Angels'	Jay Bernstein	Television film
2004	The West Wing	Terry Anders	Episode: "The Hubbert Peak"
2005	Medium	Alan	2 episodes
2005	Curb Your Enthusiasm	Man in Bathroom	Episode: "The End"
2006	The Batman	Basil Karlo / Clayface	Voice, episode: "Clayfaces"
2008	Batman: The Brave and the Bold	Orm / Ocean Master	Voice, episode: "Evil Under the Sea!"
2008	Ben 10: Alien Force	Tyler	Voice, episode: "Inside Man"
2009	Monk	Steve DeWitt	Episode: "Mr. Monk and the Dog"
2009	Glenn Martin DDS	Dr. Gary Ros	Voice, episode: "Mom Dated THAT Guy?"
2009–2011	Easy to Assemble	Bjorn Eppstein	6 episodes; recurring role
2011	9ine	Physician	Episode: "November"
2013	Drop Dead Diva	Lester Tuttle	2 episodes
2013–2014	Beware the Batman	Lonnie Machin / Anarky	Voice, recurring role (7 episodes)
2014	Nikki & Nora: The N&N Files	Carl Mottenberg	2 episodes
2015	Castle	Dar. Van Holtzman	Episode: "Hollander's Woods"
2015	CSI: Immortality	David Hodges	Television film
2015	Casual	Ian	Episode: "Pilot"
2015	Scream Queens	Mr. Putney	Episode: "The Final Girl(s)"
2016	Mike & Molly	Robert	Episode: "Cops on the Rocks"
2016	iZombie	Dr. Alan Benway	Episode: "He Blinded Me...With Science"
2016	Law & Order: Special Victims Unit	Tom Metcalfe	Episode: "Imposter"
2016	Rosewood	Duncan Jacott	Episode: "Eddie & the Empire State of Mind"
2017	Grey's Anatomy	Dr. Steve Corridan	Episode: "Who Is He (And What Is He to You)?"
2017	Doubt	Harrison Weiss	Episode: "Where Do We Go From Here?"
2017	Manhunt: Unabomber	Louis Freeh	Episode: "Publish or Perish"
2017	Criminal Minds	Mr. X	Episode: "Killer App"
2017	Good Behavior	Stephen	Episode: "You Could Discover Me"
2017	Longmire	Brian O'Keane	2 episodes
2018	Lethal Weapon	Charlie Blum	Episode: "Ruthless"
2018	Heathers	Mr. Sawyer	Recurring role
2018	Young Sheldon	Dr. Edward Pilson	1 episode
2018	My Dinner with Hervé	Aaron Spelling	Television film
2019	Veronica Mars	Courthouse Clerk	Episode: "Years, Continents, Bloodshed"
2019	The Boys	Damien Hodgman	Episode: "The Female of the Species"
2019	Shameless	Dr. Tyson	2 episodes
2019	9-1-1	Brian	Episode: "Malfunction"
2019	For All Mankind	Harold Weisner	5 episodes; recurring role (season 1)
2020	Mom	Jerry	Episode: "Silly Frills and a Depressed Garden Gnome"
2020	The Resident	John Copple	Episode: "The Flea"
2021	CSI: Vegas	David Hodges	Recurring
2021–2022	Physical	Auggie Cartwright	5 episodes; recurring role (season 1–2)
2023	1923	Kyle Murphy	One episode
2023	Perry Mason	Melville Phipps	6 episodes; recurring role (season 2)
