= Joe's Wedding =

- Directed by: Michael Kennedy
- Written by: Tony Johnston; John Dolin
- Produced by: Stavros C. Stavrides
- Starring: D. W. Moffett
- Cinematography: Ludek Bogner
- Edited by: Bill Goddard
- Music by: Mark Korven
- Production company: ARTO-pelli Motion Pictures
- Distributed by: Astral Entertainment
- Release date: October 17, 1996 (VIFF)
- Running time: 100 minutes
- Country: Canada
- Language: English

Joe's Wedding is a 1996 Canadian romantic comedy film directed by Michael Kennedy, written by Tony Johnston and John Dolan, and starring D. W. Moffett.

== Cast ==
- D. W. Moffett as Joe McCarthy
- Kate Vernon as Uta Mann
- Tammy Isbell as Melissa Federchuk
- David Hewlett as Rob Fitzgerald
- Aidan Devine as Fred McCarthy
- Sabrina Grdevich as Julie
- Harvey Atkin as Rankin
- Jayne Eastwood as Agatha Rankin
- Peter Keleghan as Dennis
- Sean Power as Bobby
- Maria Syrgiannis as Opal
- Lesley Kelly as Art Council Woman
- Carlo Rota as Art Council Man

== Award ==
The film won the "Best of Festival" prize at the Canyonlands Film and Video Festival.
