= Not Quite Human (film) =

1987 American television film

- Official release poster
- Genre: Comedy; Family; Science fiction
- Based on: Not Quite Human by Seth McEvoy
- Written by: Alan Ormsby
- Directed by: Steven Hilliard Stern
- Starring: Alan Thicke; Robyn Lively; Robert Harper; Joseph Bologna; Jay Underwood
- Music by: Tom Scott
- Country of origin: United States
- Original language: English

Production
- Executive producer: Steven Hilliard Stern
- Producer: Noel Resnick
- Production locations: Phoenix, Arizona; Scottsdale, Arizona; Coronado High School - 2501 N. 74th Street, Scottsdale, Arizona
- Cinematography: Ken Lamkin
- Editor: Ron Wisman
- Running time: 97 minutes
- Production companies: Sharmhill Productions; Walt Disney Television

Original release
- Network: ABC
- Release: December 20 – December 27, 1987

Not Quite Human is a 1987 American science fiction comedy television film directed by Steven Hilliard Stern and starring Jay Underwood, Alan Thicke, and Robyn Lively. The story is based on the Not Quite Human book series by Seth McEvoy. It is the first of three films in a series; its sequels are Not Quite Human II (1989) and Still Not Quite Human (1992).

== Plot ==
Dr. Jonas Carson creates an android that looks just like a human teenage boy, and he "adopts" him as his son and as an older brother to Becky, who names him Chip. After the Carsons move to a new town, Chip is enrolled in high school alongside Becky. Dr. Carson also goes to the high school, having filled a vacancy as a science teacher, which allows him close range to see how Chip interacts with others.

Chip's ways seem to have an awkward or amusing effect on students and teachers, depending on how it is viewed. Chip runs afoul of Coach Duckworth and strict teachers, but his literalist actions surprisingly make him some friends, as other teenagers see it as a way that he is bucking the system. Chip also gains the attention of Erin, a fellow student.

However, Dr. Carson and Chip are being stalked by Gordon Vogel, a former employer who is a defense contractor. A former colleague of Carson's, J.J. Derks, is enlisted to seek out Carson. When asked about Carson's son, Derks says Carson only has a daughter until he remembers that Carson in his younger years had confided in some friends about his idea to make a realistic android, which Derks and the others originally dismissed. Vogel tells Derks they will capture Chip, as Carson had failed to oblige an earlier contract. Since Chip was built with Vogel's resources and while Carson was supposed to honor the contract, Vogel claims he is entitled to ownership of Chip.

When Derks questions what Vogel wants with Chip, Vogel replies he intends to reprogram Chip for military purposes. Vogel and Derks kidnap Chip and attempt to reprogram him, but discover that Carson programmed a self-destruct mechanism into Chip if he were to be reprogrammed without Carson’s password. Jonas and Becky track Chip to a junkyard where Vogel is holding Chip, and Vogel traps them in his van. After Carson refuses to give Vogel the password to reprogram Chip, Derks starts reprogramming Chip, causing his anti-reprogramming device to turn on. At Becky’s urging, Jonas relents and gives them the password to prevent Chip from being destroyed. Derks continues reprogramming Chip, and Vogel attempts to get Chip to climb into a wooden crate in order to transport him to Washington, D.C. to the U.S. Patent Office in order to obtain a patent for Chip. However, Chip tricks Vogel into climbing into the crate and seals the lid shut by slamming his hand onto the nails in the lid, causing Derks to drive away, assuming it is Vogel signaling him to do so.

Chip then rescues Jonas and Becky from a car crushing machine that a junkyard worker put the van into by pulling out the power wires, causing him to short circuit. Jonas takes him home to try to revive him, but to no avail. Just as he and Becky believe Chip is “dead,” Chip rises up on the table he is on and reunites with his family, asking Jonas, “Am I a real human now?” Jonas replies happily, “You’re as human as they get!” The three embrace as the ending credits begin.

== Cast ==
- Jay Underwood as Chip Carson
- Alan Thicke as Dr. Jonas Carson, Chip's adoptive father
- Robyn Lively as Becky Carson, Chip's adoptive younger sister
- Robert Harper as J.J. Derks
- Joseph Bologna as Gordon Vogel
- Kristy Swanson as Erin Jeffries
- Lili Haydn as Jenny Beckerman
- Brandon Douglas as Scott Barnes
- Carey Scott as Paul Fairgate
- Brian Cole as Jake Blocker
- Sasha Mitchell as Bryan Skelly
- Judy Starr as Dr. Sondra Stahl
- Greg Monaghan as Coach Duckworth

== Production ==
The filming locations were in Scottsdale and Phoenix, Arizona.

== Reception ==
The film received two out of 5 stars by Creature Feature, which called it "undistinguished fodder". Entertainment Weekly gave the Not Quite Human film series a "C", calling them "shticky" and "mild". Referring to the three films collectively, they said: "These may not be Disney comedy classics on the level of The Absent-Minded Professor, but they sure beat most summer reruns".
