= Animal Miracles =

Live action TV program

- Also known as: Miracle Pets
- Genre: Reality
- Presented by: Alan Thicke
- Country of origin: Canada

Production
- Executive producers: Blair Reekie; Christopher Poole
- Producer: Carolyn Allain
- Production companies: Animal Miracles Production, Inc.

Original release
- Network: Pax TV
- Release: 2001 – 2003

Animal Miracles, also broadcast as Miracle Pets, is a one-hour, live action program that aired on the Pax TV network from 2001 to 2003, offering a perspective into the realm of human and animal interaction. Hosted by Alan Thicke, the series features animals protecting humans or other pets, one such being a llama guarding a herd of alpacas. It is also shown on Animal Planet. Each episode contains three or four segments, some extended beyond a commercial.

== Season 1 Episodes ==
Although the show had released more than forty episodes from 2001 to 2003, only thirteen episodes from the first season are available on Amazon Video. The available episodes are listed here:

1. Caesar's Sacrifice

A Canadian police dog faces a drunken gunman on a crowded schoolyard; a young girl affected with spina bifida forms a strong bond with a 32-year-old horse; a manatee is rescued by Seaworld; an aging English Mastiff saves his diabetic owner from going into insulin shock.

2. Stormy's Shark Attack

A bottlenose dolphin survives a shark attack and is nursed back to health; a yellow Labrador retriever saves his elderly owner when he collapses during a daily walk; a German Shepherd cross pulls her master from a frozen river; a black Labrador retriever saves his owner after the duo end up lost in a forest; a farmer is rescued by one of his llamas after a fence panel collapses on his right leg.

3. Cat on the Night Highway

A stray terrier warns his elderly owners of a threatening house fire; a horse alerts his owners of his injured horse friend nearby; a cat survives a house fire after warning her owner just in time; two dogs end up lost in a forest; a cat arouses her dozing owner before she falls asleep at the wheel.

4. Kiwi Pulls Through

A miniature pony visits sick, injured, and disabled children at a hospital; a German Shepherd alerts her owner of a kitchen fire; a Burmese cat arouses his owner when her heat blanket goes up in smoke; a trained service dog saves her owner from a chemical spill.

5. Keno, Avalanche Dog

A search and rescue Labrador retriever rescues an avalanche victim buried under several feet of snow; a woman befriends a gifted horse named Shagra; a rescued bald eagle finds a new home at a rehabilitation center; a cocker spaniel saves her owner from a house fire.

6. Poudre's Catch of the Day

A Golden Retriever pulls her owner out of a raging river after a fly-fishing accident; a Rottweiler helps his owner breathe when a power outage shuts off her breathing tank; a woman builds a sanctuary for alligators, iguanas, and other reptiles; a woman who had been in prison relives her childhood passion by taking care of dogs; a housecat alerts his owners of a living room fire.

7. Hand Me the Bat

A Rottweiler protects her truck-driving master from a trio of ruthless thugs; an overweight dachshund saves his owners from multiple fires in the house; a ten-year-old blind girl rides a racing horse; a Royal Canadian Mounted Police officer and his German shepherd track down a family lost in the Rocky Mountains; an abused Asian elephant befriends another abused elephant at an elephant sanctuary.

8. Dakota Angel

A small terrier is rescued from a freezing river; a Golden Retriever saves his owner and other people from heart attacks; a young girl befriends dolphins and sea turtles while trying marine animal assisted therapy; a black Labrador retriever saves his blind owner from an oncoming car; the demeanor of a teenage boy changes when he befriends a horse.

9. Dixie and the Snake

A cat saves her five kittens from a warehouse fire; a three-legged Labrador saves her owner from a boating accident; a pitbull protects her owner's three small children from a venomous water moccasin; a bomb dog saves a man's life with his sense of smell; a black lab sniffs out and catches an arsonist.

10. Keno's Accomplishment

A police dog tracks down a criminal despite being hit by an oncoming car; a woman and her daughter adopt an abused stray dog that had been badly burned; an Australian shepherd tries to warn his owner of a dangerous date; a prisoner works with horses at a prison's horse training facility; a farmer befriends a mysterious dog when his wife falls unexpectedly ill.

11. Tuff Stops the Stampede

An English setter warns his owners of an approaching tornado; a recovering alcoholic befriends an abused pit bull; a blind cat fights off a burglar breaking into her owners' house; a woman rebuilds her life after swimming with humpback whales; a sheepdog defends his injured elderly master from a stampeding herd of cattle.

12. Green Chimneys

A woman reunites with her horse Irish after more than twenty years of separation; a cocker spaniel pulls his young master's father off of a busy road after he passes out;

13. Misty Fire
