= The Invisible Kid =

- Theatrical release poster
- Directed by: Avery Crounse
- Written by: Avery Crounse
- Produced by: Philip J. Spinelli
- Starring: Jay Underwood; Wally Ward; Chynna Phillips; Brother Theodore; Karen Black
- Cinematography: Michael Barnard
- Edited by: Gabrielle Gilbert
- Music by: Steve Hunter; Jan King
- Production company: Elysian Pictures
- Distributed by: Taurus Entertainment Company
- Release date: March 30, 1988 (United States)
- Running time: 95 minutes
- Country: United States
- Language: English

The Invisible Kid is a 1988 American teen science fiction comedy film written and directed by Avery Crounse. The film stars Jay Underwood, Wally Ward, Chynna Phillips, Brother Theodore, and Karen Black.

== Plot ==
Following in his deceased father's footsteps, Grover Dunn finds a magic formula that makes him vanish. The formula causes all types of trouble for Grover and his mother and the love of his life when his high school principal rigs a basketball game; and he enlists the aid of a put-down cop to investigate.

== Cast ==
- Jay Underwood as Grover Dunn
- Wally Ward as Milton McClane
- Chynna Phillips as Cindy Moore
- Brother Theodore as Dr. Theodore
- Karen Black as Deborah Dunn
- Mike Genovese as Officer Chuck Malone

== Reception ==
Caryn James of The New York Times wrote that it "proves you can cull every known cliche from successful teen adventure films and still come up with a bomb". Michael Wilmington of the Los Angeles Times wrote, "Blank leader projected on the screen would have been an improvement".
