= Alan Thicke =

Canadian actor, songwriter, and television host (1947–2016)

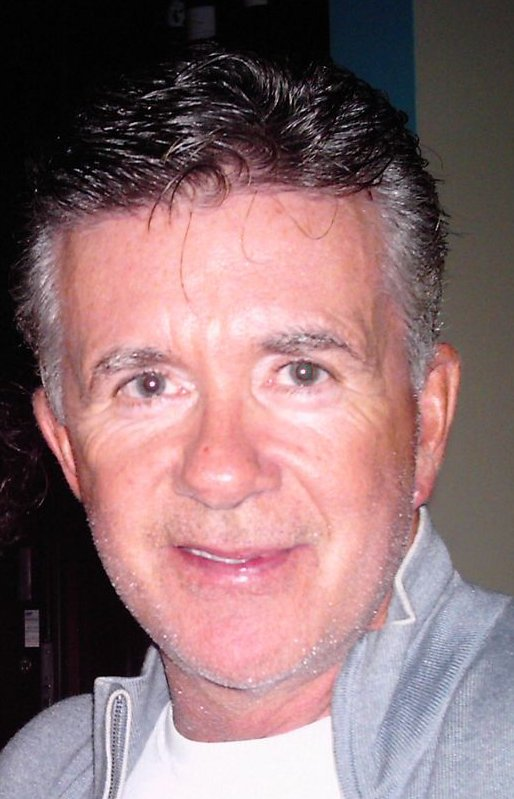
- Thicke in 2003
- Born: Alan Willis Jeffrey; 1 March 1947; Kirkland Lake, Ontario, Canada
- Died: 13 December 2016 (aged 69); Burbank, California, U.S.
- Resting place: Santa Barbara Cemetery, Santa Barbara, California, U.S.
- Other name: Alan Willis Thicke
- Education: University of Western Ontario
- Occupations: Actor, composer, television host
- Years active: 1969–2016
- Spouses: Gloria Loring (m. 1970; div. 1984); Gina Tolleson (m. 1994; div. 1999); Tanya Callau (m. 2005)
- Children: 3, including Robin Thicke
- Relatives: Todd Thicke (half-brother)

Alan Willis Thicke (née Jeffrey; 1 March 1947 – 13 December 2016) was a Canadian-American actor, songwriter, and game/talk show host. He is the father of singer Robin Thicke. Thicke was best known for playing Dr. Jason Seaver on the 1980s sitcom Growing Pains on ABC. In 2013, he was inducted into Canada's Walk of Fame.

== Early life ==
Thicke was born on 1 March 1947 in Kirkland Lake, Ontario, the son of Shirley "Joan" Isobel Marie (née Greer), a nurse, and William Jeffrey, a stockbroker. They divorced in 1953. His mother married Brian Thicke, a physician, and they moved to Elliot Lake. Taking his stepfather's name, Thicke graduated from Elliot Lake Secondary School in 1965. He went on to attend the University of Western Ontario, joining the Delta Upsilon fraternity.

== Career ==
=== Hosting ===
==== Game shows ====
Thicke hosted the Canadian game show Face the Music for CHCH-TV by Niagara Television in 1975 (not affiliated with Sandy Frank Productions' 1980-81 version). He hosted the Canadian game show First Impressions on the CTV network during the 1976–77 season, taped at CFCF-TV in Montreal, the Saturday morning celebrity game show Animal Crack-Ups in the late 1980s, and, in 1997, a television version of the board game Pictionary. In the early 2000s, he hosted the All New 3's a Crowd on the Game Show Network.

==== Talk shows ====
Norman Lear hired Thicke to produce and head the writing staff of Fernwood 2 Night, a tongue-in-cheek talk show based on characters from Lear's earlier show, Mary Hartman, Mary Hartman. In the late 1970s, he was a frequent guest host of The Alan Hamel Show, a popular daytime talk show on Canadian TV, usually hosted by Alan Hamel. When the Hamel series ended in the early 1980s, it was replaced by The Alan Thicke Show. The show at one point spawned a prime-time spinoff, Prime Cuts, which consisted of edited highlights from the talk show.

Thicke was later signed to do an American syndicated late-night talk show, Thicke of the Night, for the 1983–1984 TV season. Heavily promoted prior to broadcast as a competitor to NBC's The Tonight Show Starring Johnny Carson, Thicke of the Night was short-lived.

=== Producing and composing ===
Thicke had a successful career as a TV theme song composer, often collaborating with his then-wife Gloria Loring on these projects, which included the themes to the popular sitcoms Diff'rent Strokes and The Facts of Life. He also wrote a number of TV game show themes, including The Wizard of Odds (for which he also sang the vocal introduction), The Joker's Wild, Celebrity Sweepstakes, The Diamond Head Game, Animal Crack-Ups (which he co-wrote with his brother Todd Thicke and Gary Pickus), Blank Check, Stumpers!, Whew!, and the original theme to Wheel of Fortune. Thicke was a popular songwriter. He co-wrote "Sara", a solo hit for Bill Champlin and included on the latter's Runaway album (1981).

Thicke produced a variety of television shows, including Anne Murray Christmas specials for the CBC, beginning in the late 1970s.

=== Growing Pains ===
Thicke became well known when he played Jason Seaver, a psychiatrist and father, on the family sitcom Growing Pains. When the show began, Jason was moving his psychiatry practice into the home to be closer to the family's children while the family matriarch Maggie, played by Joanna Kerns, resumed her career as a reporter. Growing Pains debuted on ABC in 1985 and ran until 1992. For his role, Thicke was nominated for a Golden Globe award in 1988.

Thicke reprised his role in two reunion TV movies, The Growing Pains Movie (2000) and Growing Pains: Return of the Seavers (2004).

=== Television and film appearances ===
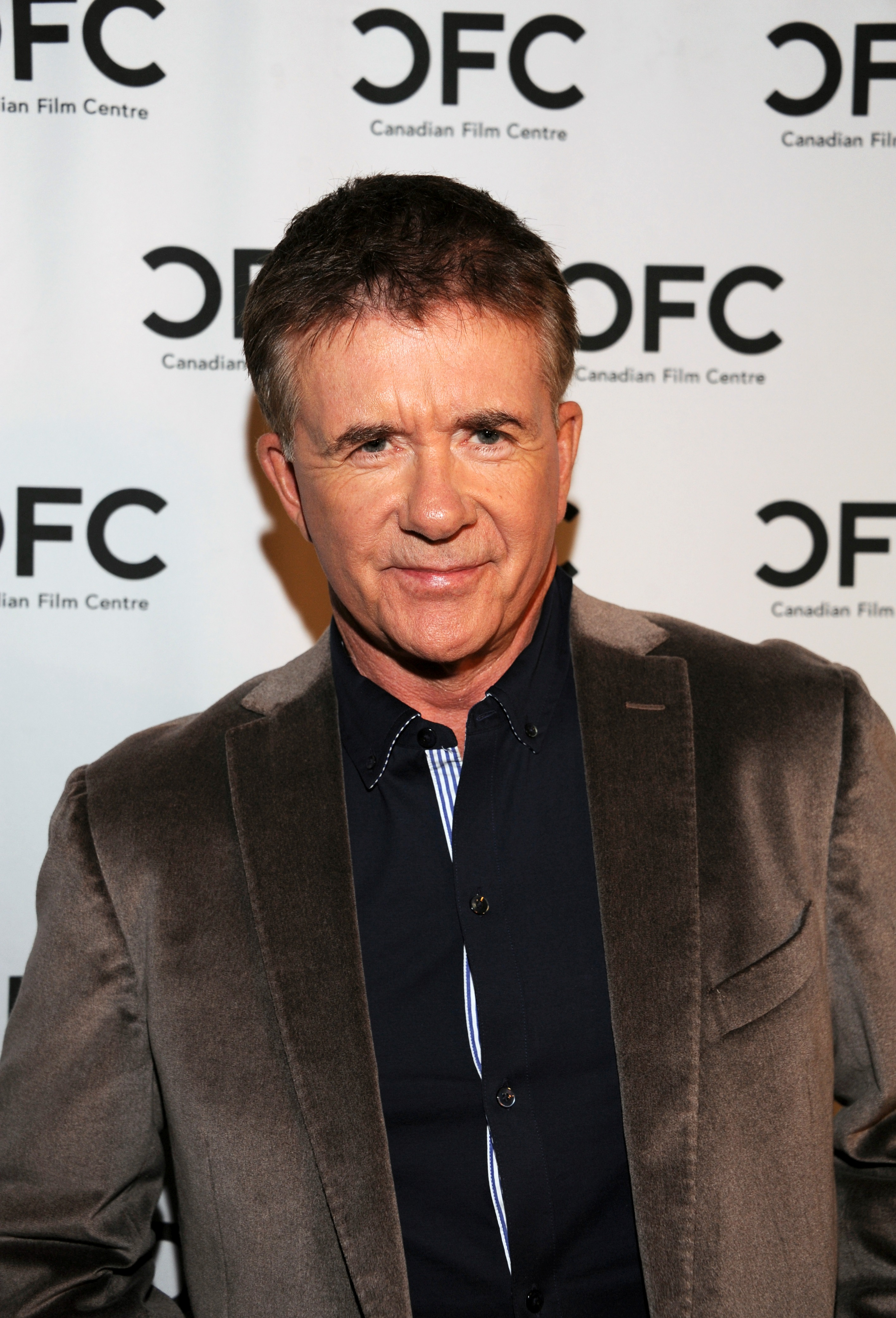
Thicke at a Canadian Film Centre and Variety-hosted reception for the Telefilm Canada Features Comedy Lab, March 2012

Thicke co-hosted the Walt Disney World Very Merry Christmas Parade (now the Disney Parks Christmas Day Parade) with Joan Lunden from 1983 to 1990, when he was succeeded by Regis Philbin. Thicke also hosted the 1987 and 1988 Crystal Light National Aerobic Championships.

In 1987, Thicke appeared as Dr. Jonas Carson, who creates an android that looks just like a human teenage boy (played by Jay Underwood), and he "adopts" him as his son in the Disney Channel film Not Quite Human. Thicke reprised his role as Jonas Carson in two sequels, 1989's Not Quite Human II and 1992's Still Not Quite Human.

In 1988, he hosted the Miss USA Pageant in El Paso, Texas, replacing Bob Barker (who quit over fur being involved in the pageants). He replaced Barker again as host of the 1988 Miss Universe Pageant (along with Tracy Scoggins) in Taipei, Taiwan. Thicke was replaced by Dick Clark as host of the 1989 Miss USA Pageant in Mobile, Alabama and by John Forsythe as host of the 1989 Miss Universe Pageant in Cancún, Mexico.

Thicke continued to host a wide range of variety TV events. In 1989, he co-hosted with SCTV alumna Andrea Martin the TV special Opening of SkyDome in Toronto, which aired across Canada on the CBC. In 2004, he hosted the Miss Universe Canada Pageant in Ontario.

In 1992, Thicke appeared as himself in the pilot episode of the sitcom Hangin' with Mr. Cooper. He appeared in the end-credits scene, alongside series star Mark Curry, humorously referencing the pilot episode being filmed on the same set used as the Seavers' home on Growing Pains. He also made guest appearances on shows such as Murder, She Wrote; Married... with Children; Son of the Beach and 7th Heaven.

From 1995 to 1996, Thicke appeared on the American television series Hope & Gloria, which ran for 35 episodes. In March 2002, Thicke participated in a celebrity version of Fear Factor. In May 2002, he appeared in the season six finale of Just Shoot Me, "The Boys in the Band." From 2006 to 2009, Thicke was talk show host Rich Ginger on The Bold and the Beautiful.

From 2001 to 2003, Thicke hosted Animal Miracles on the Pax TV network. In April 2006, he hosted Celebrity Cooking Showdown on NBC, in which celebrities were teamed with famous chefs in a cooking competition.

==== Later appearances ====
In 2008, Thicke appeared in a major supporting role as Jim Jarlewski in the television series adaptation of Douglas Coupland's jPod. That same year, he had a cameo appearance in the How I Met Your Mother episode "Sandcastles in the Sand" as the dad in Robin Scherbatsky's second "Robin Sparkles" music video. He guest starred as himself in the episodes "The Rough Patch", "Glitter", "P.S. I Love You", and "The Rehearsal Dinner".

In February 2009, Thicke made guest appearances on Adult Swim's Tim and Eric Awesome Show, Great Job. and the web series Star-ving. He also had a role in the 2009 film, The Goods: Live Hard, Sell Hard. On 10 July 2009, Alan appeared on the 1000th episode of Attack of the Show!, singing with Kevin Pereira and Olivia Munn, kissing Olivia on lips in the end of the skit.

Thicke made a guest appearance on a few episodes of Canada's Worst Handyman 5. In January 2010, Thicke appeared on the television program, Tosh.0. In March 2010, he made an appearance in La La Land as himself. In October 2010, he appeared as a celebrity contestant on Don't Forget the Lyrics, where he played for the charities ProCon.org and the Alan Thicke Center for diabetes research.

In March 2013, he participated on ABC's Celebrity Wife Swap. He swapped wives with comedian Gilbert Gottfried. From 2014 to 2015, Thicke starred in his own reality series, Unusually Thicke, which aired on Pop.

In October 2016, Thicke appeared as himself in the pilot episode of NBC's This is Us.

==== Other hosting ====
During 2014 and 2015 Thicke hosted a travelling dance show Dancing Pros Live which toured the United States.

==== Commercials ====
In the 1990s, Thicke was the spokesman for the Canadian division of Woolco department stores until its demise in 1994. In 2007, Thicke appeared in a television ad for Tahiti Village, a Las Vegas time-share resort. In 2009, Thicke began appearing in TV ads endorsing CCS Medical, a distributor of home-delivered diabetes supplies. In 2014, he began representing Optima Tax Relief.

From 2011, Thicke was the spokesperson for Cambridge Life Solutions, a Canadian company that promised to reduce unsecured consumer debt through a method known as debt settlement, which had been outlawed in the United States by the Federal Trade Commission as a predatory practice in 2010 and was subsequently banned in Ontario in 2015. According to Scott Hannah, the president and CEO of the Credit Counseling Society of Canada, the company, which was accused of "bilking thousands of vulnerable Canadians" eventually dominated half of the Canadian market due to Thicke's hiring "as a spokesman who was very credible to Canadians."

== Personal life ==
Thicke was married three times: His first marriage, to Days of Our Lives actress Gloria Loring, lasted from 1970 until 1984; they had two sons, Brennan and Robin. He married his second wife, Miss World 1990 Gina Tolleson, on 13 August 1994, and had a son, Carter William Thicke, before their divorce was finalized on 29 September 1999. In 1999, he met Tanya Callau in Miami, where he was a celebrity host and she was a model. They were married from 2005 until his death.

Thicke lent his name and star power to supporting the Alan Thicke Center for diabetes research. Also, for several years in the mid-1980s, Thicke and Gloria Loring were co-hosts of Telemiracle, an annual 20-hour telethon that alternated between Saskatoon and Regina, Saskatchewan, to support programs run by the Kinsmen Club.

== Death ==
On 13 December 2016, Thicke collapsed while playing ice hockey with his son Carter at Pickwick Gardens in Burbank, California. The manager of the rink said he was talking and even joked to his son to take a photo as he was being wheeled out on a stretcher. Thicke died later that day of type-A aortic dissection at the Providence Saint Joseph Medical Center in Burbank, at age 69. On 19 December 2016, the cast of Growing Pains, including Leonardo DiCaprio, reunited at Thicke's funeral; a eulogy was given by his friend Bob Saget, and his son, Robin, offered a humorous remembrance. He was buried at Santa Barbara Cemetery in Santa Barbara, California.

== Filmography ==
=== Film ===
Year	Title	Role	Notes
1971	The Point!	Narrator / Father	Voice, third telecast
1983	Copper Mountain	Jackson Reach	
1987	Not Quite Human	Dr. Jonas Carson	
1989	Not Quite Human II	Dr. Jonas Carson	
1991	And You Thought Your Parents Were Weird	Matthew Carson / Newman	Voice
1992	Still Not Quite Human	Dr. Jonas Carson / Bonus	
1993	Stepmonster	George Dougherty	
1993	Betrayal of the Dove	Jack West	
1995	Open Season	Xanex	
1996	Demolition High	Slater	
1998	Anarchy TV	Reverend Wright	
1998	Casper Meets Wendy	Baseball Announcer	
2000	Bear with Me	Ken Robinson	
2000	Ice Angel	Coach Parker	
2001	Xin shi zi jie tou (X-Roads)	Steve	
2001	Teddy Bears' Picnic	Himself	
2003	Carolina	Chuck McBride – Perfect Date Host	
2003	Hollywood North	Peter Casey	
2004	Raising Helen	Hockey Cantor	
2004	Childstar	J.R.	
2006	Alpha Dog	Douglas Holden	
2006	The Surfer King	Pipeman	
2009	The Goods: Live Hard, Sell Hard	Stu Harding	
2009	RoboDoc	Dr. Roskin	
2012	That's My Boy	TV Version Donny's Dad	
2012	Hemingway	Paul Hemmingway	
2013	Cubicle Warriors	Peter Hoss	
2015	Being Canadian	Himself	Documentary
2017	It's Not My Fault and I Don't Care Anyway	Patrick Spencer	Posthumous release
2017	The Clapper	Himself	Posthumous release
2017	Love's Last Resort	Paul Roberts	Posthumous release (final film role)

=== Television ===
==== Series ====
Year	Title	Role	Notes
1969	It's Our Stuff		Regular
1974	Jack: A Flash Fantasy	Jack of Diamonds	
1978	America 2-Night	Doug	Episode: "I Am Democracy"
1980–1982	The Alan Thicke Show	Himself/host	Also writer and producer
1983–1984	Thicke of the Night	Himself/host	Also writer and executive producer
1984	Masquerade		Episode: "Sleeper"
1984	The Love Boat	Alan Price / Robert McBride / Senator Bob Townsend	3 episodes
1985	Scene of the Crime	Craig Spears	Episode: "A Vote for Murder"
1985–1992	Growing Pains	Jason Seaver	
1990	The Hitchhiker	Mickey Black	Episode: "Tough Guys Don't Whine"
1992	Travelquest	Host	
1993	Murder, She Wrote	Harrison M. Kane	Episode: "The Phantom Killer"
1994	Burke's Law		Episode: "Who Killed the Beauty Queen?"
1995	Minor Adjustments	Roger	Episode: "The Ex-Files"
1995	Hope & Gloria	Dennis Dupree	
1996	Dave's World	Action Hero	Episode: "Based on a True Story"
1996–1997	Married... with Children	Henry / Bruce	3 episodes
1997	The Outer Limits	Donald Rivers	Episode: "A Special Edition"
1997	Pictionary	Host	
1999	Arliss	Doctor	Episode: "Rules of the Game"
2000	Beggars and Choosers		Episode: "The Woodhouse Conundrum"
2000	Son of the Beach	Captain 'Buck' Enteneille / Captain Buck Enteneille	3 episodes
2001	7th Heaven	Ed Palmer	Episode: "Parents"
2001–2003	Animal Miracles	Himself	Host
2002	Just Shoot Me!	Himself	Episode: "The Boys in the Band"
2002	Today's Man	Host	CNBC, dates unknown, premiered May 2002
2003	EGG, the Arts Show	Alan Scott	Episode: "Broadway Workshop"
2004	My Wife and Kids	Magician	Episode: "Fantasy Camp: Part 2"
2005	Yes, Dear	Joel	Episode: "The New Neighbors"
2005	Half & Half	Gavin Storm	Episode: "The Big Mothers for Others Episode"
2005	Joey	Himself	Episode: "Joey and the Poker"
2006–2009	The Bold and the Beautiful	Rich Ginger	7 episodes
2007	Ned's Declassified School Survival Guide	Hal E. Burton	Episode: "Spring Fever & the School Newspaper"
2008	About a Girl	Dude's Dad	Episode: "About a Homecoming"
2008	JPod	Jim Jarlewski	13 episodes
2008–2013	How I Met Your Mother	Himself	5 episodes
2009	Tim and Eric Awesome Show	Dr. Alan Thicke	Season 4, Episode 2 (The Cinco Napple)
2010	Canada's Worst Handyman 5	Himself	
2010	Tosh.0	Himself	Episode: "Crystal Light Dancers (Reunion)"
2011	I'm in the Band	Simon Craig	5 episodes
2011	This Hour Has 22 Minutes	Himself	
2012	The L.A. Complex	Donald Gallagher	4 episodes
2012	Fugget About It	Richard Wheatthin	Episode: "Screw You, Mr. Wonderful"
2013	Celebrity Wife Swap	Himself	Season 2, episode 3
2014	Unusually Thicke	Himself	Reality show; 14 episodes
2014	American Dad!	Himself	Episode: "Permanent Record Wrecker"
2015	Scream Queens	Tad Radwell	Episode: "Thanksgiving"
2015	The Jack and Triumph Show	Himself	Episode: "Commercial"
2016	Grandfathered	Himself	Episode: "Jimmy's 50th, Again"
2016	Mike Tyson Mysteries	Walter Morgan	Episode: "Unholy Matrimony"
2016	This is Us	Himself	Episode: "Pilot"
2016	The Eric Andre Show	David Alan Thicke (with David Alan Grier) / Himself	Season 4, Episode 9
2016	Fuller House	Mike	Episode: "Mom Interference"
2016	Chopped Junior	Judge	Season 3, Episode 8
2016	The Stanley Dynamic	Episode: "The Stanley Band"	
2017	Chopped	Contestant	Season 33; 5 epi. "Star Power" tournament *Posthumous release

==== Television movies ====
Year	Title	Role	Notes
1983	Copper Mountain	Jackson Reach	
1984	Calendar Girl Murders	Alan Conti	
1986	Perry Mason: The Case of the Shooting Star	Steve Carr	
1987	Not Quite Human	Dr. Jonas Carson	
1988	14 Going on 30	The real Forndexter	
1988	Obsessed	Conrad Vaughan	
1988	Dance 'til Dawn	Jack Lefcourt	
1989	Not Quite Human II	Dr. Jonas Carson	
1990	Jury Duty: The Comedy	Phil Beckman	
1992	The Trial of Red Riding Hood	The Wolf	
1992	Still Not Quite Human	Dr. Jonas Carson/Bonus Carson	
1993	Rubdown	Raymond Holliman	
1994	Lamb Chop in the Haunted Studio	Alan	
1995	Lamb Chop's Special Chanukah	Alan	
1996	Windsor Protocol	Senator Joplin Hardy	
1996	Shari's Passover Surprise	Alan	
1996	The Secret She Carried	Reed Epperson	Uncredited
1997	Shadow of the Bear	William Andrich	
1997	Any Place But Home	August Danforth	
1998	Thunder Point	Joplin Hardy	
1998	Casper Meets Wendy	Baseball Announcer	
1999	Two of Hearts	Hank Powers	
2000	Ice Angel	Coach Parker	
2000	The Growing Pains Movie	Jason Seaver	
2004	Growing Pains: Return of the Seavers	Jason Seaver	
2010	Making a Scene	The Producer	
2013	Camp Sunshine	Ken Handcourt	
2013	Bad Management	Tobias Sr.	
2013	Let It Snow	Ted Beck	
2014	A Cookie Cutter Christmas	Chef Kruger	
2016	Stop the Wedding	Sean Castleberry	
2017	Loves Last Resort	Paul Roberts	

== Books ==
- Thicke, Alan (May 1999). How Men Have Babies: The Pregnant Father's Survival Guide. Contemporary Books. ISBN 978-0-8092-2806-5.
- Thicke, Alan (27 April 2006). How To Raise Kids Who Won't Hate You: Family Wisdom and Humor from a Favorite TV Dad. iUniverse Star. ISBN 978-0-595-84288-9.

== Honours ==
- 1982: Star named after him in the International Star Registry
- 1988: Nominated – Golden Globe Award for Best Performance by an Actor in a TV-Series – Comedy/Musical for Growing Pains
- 1998: Nominated – Daytime Emmy Award for Outstanding Audience Participation Show/Game Show for Pictionary (co-executive producer)
- 2013: Inducted into Canada's Walk of Fame
- 2015: Brampton Arts Walk of Fame
- 2016: Canadian Icon award, Whistler Film Festival
