= JETS – Leben am Limit =

- Country of origin: Germany

JETS – Leben am Limit is a German television series.
