= Robert Harper (actor) =

American actor (1951–2020)

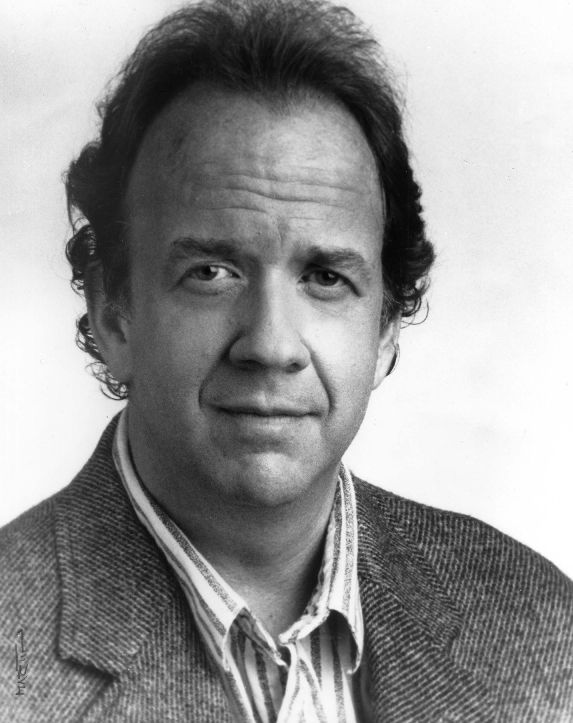
- Harper in 1996
- Born: May 19, 1951; New York City, New York, U.S.
- Died: January 23, 2020 (aged 68); Rotterdam, South Holland, Netherlands
- Education: Rutgers
- Occupation: Actor
- Years active: 1978–2006
- Spouses: Lisa Pelikan (m. 1981; div. 1984) Sascha Noorthoorn van der Kruyff (m. 2005)

Robert Francis Harper (May 19, 1951 – January 23, 2020) was an American stage, film, and television actor.

== Early life ==
Raised in Middletown Township, New Jersey, he attended Mater Dei High School. He graduated with honors from Rutgers University with a degree in English literature.

== Career ==
Following his college graduation, Harper took a job at Arena Stage, where he performed in plays by Shakespeare, Ibsen, Miller, and Wilder.
He appeared on Broadway in a revival of Once in a Lifetime (directed by Tom Moore), The Inspector General, and the original cast of Arthur Miller's The American Clock.

Harper was perhaps most well known for his role as Sharkey in Once Upon a Time in America. He also portrayed Charlie Gereson in Creepshow. Other film credits include Wiseguy, Final Analysis, The Insider, Deconstructing Harry, and Molly.

Harper played lawyers on several occasions and said he had an interest in the law. He played Bubba Weisberger on the 1987–1988 sitcom Frank's Place. Harper's immersion into the character included spending a month at Tulane University Law School, carrying a novel by Southern writer Walker Percy while on the set, and reading short stories by Tennessee Williams. A Chicago Tribune review called Harper "a slow-moving joy to behold as the seersucker-rumpled lawyer."

In May 2007, Harper delivered the Commencement Address at University College, Rutgers.

== Personal life and death ==
On May 30, 1981, he married Lisa Pelikan, an actress.

He was later married to a Dutch woman, Sascha Noorthoorn van der Kruyff, and he died in Rotterdam.

== Filmography ==
Year	Title	Role	Notes
1981	Mommie Dearest	David	
1982	Creepshow	Charlie Gereson	(Segment: "The Crate")
1984	Once Upon a Time in America	Sharkey	
1986	Wanted: Dead or Alive	Dave Henderson	
1987	Amazing Grace and Chuck	Bowman	
1988	Twins	Gilbert Larsen	
1989	The War of the Roses	Heath	
1992	Final Analysis	Alan Lowenthal	
1993	Gunmen	Rance	
1993	The Wrong Man	Felix Crawley	Made-for-cable movie
1997	Deconstructing Harry	Harry's Doctor	
1999	Molly	Dr. Simmons	
1999	The Insider	Mark Stern	

== Television ==
Year	Title	Role	Notes
1983	13 Thirteenth Avenue	Marv Hoberman	TV movie
1983	Dempsey	Damon Runyon	TV movie
1984	Remington Steele	Todd Doke	Episode: "Dreams of Steele"
1985	Dallas	Emergency Doctor	Episode: "Close Encounters"
1986	Kung Fu: The Movie	Prosecutor	TV movie
1986	Newhart	Mr. Lalow	Episode: "Saturday in New York with George"
1987	J. Edgar Hoover	Clyde Tolson	TV movie
1987	Stingray	Billy	Episode: "Echoes"
1987	Deadly Deception	Garrett	TV movie
1987	Murder Ordained	Warren	TV movie
1987	Not Quite Human	J.J. Derks	TV movie
1987	Knots Landing	Priest	Episode: "The Gift of Life"
1987–1988	Matlock	Walter Judd / Michael Palmer	2 episodes
1987–1988	Frank's Place	Bubba 'Si' Weisberger	22 episodes
1988	Outback Bound	Bennett	TV movie
1988	Murphy Brown	Henry Tucker	Episode: "Set Me Free"
1989	CBS Schoolbreak Special	Charles Bird	Episode: "Words to Live By"
1989	Roseanne	Dr. Edgar Lang	1 episode
1989	The Case of the Hillside Stranglers	Los Angeles Deputy D.A. Richard Carson	TV movie
1989	My Name Is Bill W.	Dr. Jeremy Partlin	TV movie
1989	Nick Knight	Dr. Jack Brittington	TV movie
1989	Jake and the Fatman	Paul Abbot	Episode: "The Way You Look Tonight"
1989	Wiseguy	Dewitt Clipton	4 episodes
1990	Love and Lies	Clinton Posey	TV movie
1990	Babies	Sam Clarington	TV movie
1991	Held Hostage: The Sis and Jerry Levin Story	Moorehead	TV movie
1991	Gabriel's Fire	Doc Fulton	Episode: "One Flew Over the Bird's Nest"
1991	Star Trek: The Next Generation	Lathal Bine	Episode: "The Host" (uncredited)
1991	Payoff	Benny Cowan	TV movie
1992	Room for Two	Timothy Sinowsky	Episode: "Psyched!"
1992	The Commish	Professor Gerald Hanick	Episode: "Video Vigilante"
1992	Murder, She Wrote	Paul Crenshaw	Episode: "Murder in Milan"
1992	Running Mates	Gordy Faust	TV movie
1989–1993	L.A. Law	Brian LaPorte	4 episodes
1993	Love & War	Dr. Gilroy	Episode: "I Got Plenty of Nothing"
1995	The Cosby Mysteries	Episode: "Dial 'H' for Murder"	
1995	Picket Fences		Episode: "A Change of Season"
1995	The Home Court	Father Jablonski	Episode: "The Sydney That Works"
1996	Bless This House	Thad	Episode: "One Man's Ceiling Is Another Man's Stereo"
1996	The Siege at Ruby Ridge	Earl Martens	TV movie
1997	NYPD Blue	Terry Tirelli	Episode: "Three Girls and a Baby"
1998	Michael Hayes	Bomber	Episode: "Imagine: Part 1"
1998	Any Day Now		Episode: "Huh?"
1998	Law & Order	John St. John	Episode: "True North"
2001–2002	Philly	Judge Irwin Hawes	13 episodes
2006	Gilmore Girls	Dr. Shapiro	Episode: "The Perfect Dress"
2006	Commander in Chief	Owen Latimer	Episode: "No Nukes Is Good Nukes"
