= Jason Presson =

American actor (born 1971)

- Born: August 31, 1971 (age 55); Encino, California, USA
- Occupation: Actor
- Years active: 1983–1997

Jason Presson (born August 31, 1971) is a former American child actor, best known for his role of Darren in the 1985 movie Explorers, alongside Ethan Hawke and River Phoenix.

== Career ==
His debut came in 1984 with the film The Stone Boy performing with Robert Duvall and Glenn Close. The following year, he was selected to play Darren Woods in Joe Dante's big budget movie, Explorers, with Ethan Hawke and River Phoenix. This movie was not a blockbuster, but earned nominations to the three protagonists at the Young Artist Award in the category for 'Best Young Actor'. The winner was his co-star and friend River Phoenix. Dante liked Presson's performance and subsequently cast him in a similar role in "The Shadow Man", a Twilight Zone segment which Dante directed.

In 1990, he had a minor role in the movie Gremlins 2: The New Batch, returning to work with the director Joe Dante after five years.

== Filmography ==
Year	Title	Role	Notes
1983	Wishman	Bruce Kaleb	TV movie
1984	The Stone Boy	Arnold Hillerman	
1984	Invitation to Hell	Billy	main character
1984	Trapper John, M.D.	Jamie Bruce	Episode: "A Change of Heart"
1984	Finder of Lost Loves	Jonathan Hodges	Episode: "White Lies"
1985	Explorers	Darren Woods	
1985	Webster	Frank	Episode: "Who's to Blame?"
1985	The Twilight Zone	Eric	Segment: "The Shadow Man"
1986	The Wonderful World of Disney: The Leftovers	Charlie	1 episode
1986	The Wonderful World of Disney: The B.R.A.T. Patrol	Raymond McGeorge	1 episode
1988	Lady in White	Geno Scarlatti	
1988	Saturday the 14th Strikes Back	Eddie Baxter	
1989	I Know My First Name Is Steven	Deke	
1990	Gremlins 2: The New Batch	Alex the Yogurt Jerk	
1990	Room for Romance		1 episode
1991	Never Forget	Bernie Mermelstein	TV movie
1991	Rugrats	Ramone "Rocko"	1 episode
1991	In the Heat of the Night	Jimmy Miller	1 episode
1997	Busted	Baker #1	
1997	Trials of Life	Ren	TV movie
