= The Good Company =

- Genre: Variety
- Written by: Mark Shekter; Alan Thicke
- Country of origin: Canada
- Original language: English
- No. of seasons: 2

Production
- Producers: Terry Kyne (1968); Dave Thomas (1969)
- Running time: 30 minutes

Original release
- Network: CBC Television
- Release: 17 June 1968 – 8 September 1969

The Good Company is a Canadian variety television program that aired on CBC Television as mid-season programming from 1968 to 1969.

== Premise ==
The Good Company was a group of 25 performers between the ages of 16 and 25, originally appearing on a special broadcast for Juliette. The television series was of a variety format that featured 20 of the 25 Good Company members. Norman Amadio served as the series musical director.

== Scheduling ==
This half-hour series was broadcast on Mondays at 9:00 p.m. (Eastern) from 17 June to 12 September 1968 in its first season, and from 30 June to 8 September 1969 in the final season.
