= Not Quite Human =

Young adult series by Seth McEvoy

- Batteries Not Included (1985); All Geared Up (1985); A Bug in the System (1985); Reckless Robot (1986); Terror at Play (1986); Killer Robot (1986)
- Author: Seth McEvoy
- Illustrator: Ted Enck
- Language: English
- Genre: Children's; Science fiction
- Published: 1985–1986
- Media type: Print
- No. of books: 6

Not Quite Human is the name of a series of young adult novels by Seth McEvoy about a scientist and his android creation which resembles a teenager.

The series consists of six books: Batteries Not Included (1985), All Geared Up (1985), A Bug in the System (1985), Reckless Robot (1986), Terror at Play (1986), and Killer Robot (1986).

== Description ==
Widower scientist, Dr. Jonas Carson's lifetime work is to create an android he names Chip. In order to conceal his project from those who would use Chip or Dr. Carson's skills for sinister purposes, Dr. Carson passes off Chip as a student at a junior high school and claims he is his son. His daughter, Becky, is the only other one who knows the secret, and Dr. Carson takes a job as a science teacher at the school to keep an eye on his "son". Chip has superior abilities such as great strength and a photographic memory, but also has a large density which gives him more weight than humans of his size. Chip also has a tendency to interpret communication quite literally. Throughout the novels, Chip better simulates being human as he gains a better understanding of humans.

The books were later made into a series of made-for-TV films for the Walt Disney anthology television series, starring Alan Thicke as Dr. Jonas Carson, Robyn Lively as his daughter Becky, and Jay Underwood as Chip. Chip is created to look age 17 at the start of the film series, as opposed to 13 in the novels.

== Novel series ==
- Not Quite Human #1: Batteries Not Included (October 1985)
- Not Quite Human #2: All Geared Up (October 1985)
- Not Quite Human #3: A Bug in the System (November 1985)
- Not Quite Human #4: Reckless Robot (May 1986)
- Not Quite Human #5: Terror At Play (June 1986)
- Not Quite Human #6: Killer Robot (October 1986)

== TV movies ==
- Not Quite Human (1987)
- Not Quite Human II (1989)
- Still Not Quite Human (1992)

== See also ==
- Small Wonder – a TV series (1985–89) in which a scientist creates a robot, passing her off as his daughter, with only his son and wife knowing the truth.
- Dr. Slump – a manga (1980–84) and anime (1981–86) about a scientist who creates a robot that he passes off as his daughter, and the sci-fi misadventures they get into.
