= Rosa Langschwadt Nevin =

American actress (born 1962)

Rosa Langschwadt Nevin (born June 14, 1962 in Cuba) is an American actress, who was best known for playing the character of Cecily Davidson on the soap opera All My Children. She first appeared on the soap in 1986 and departed on January 11, 1990, only to return in 1994 for another stint, this one lasting two more years.

Langschwadt Nevin was born in Cuba to a Spanish mother and German father and grew up in Spain, New York and Miami. She became interested in a career in entertainment while singing in her high school chorus. She attended the University of Miami where she received a bachelor's degree in fine arts. Afterwards, she began acting in several Florida-based theaters including Coconut Grove Playhouse. She has appeared in six music videos for bands such as Oingo Boingo.

In the late 1980s, she married actor Gerald Nevin.
