= Still Not Quite Human =

1992 American television film

- Official release poster
- Genre: Comedy; Family; Science fiction
- Based on: Not Quite Human by Seth McEvoy
- Written by: Eric Luke
- Directed by: Eric Luke
- Starring: Jay Underwood; Alan Thicke
- Music by: John Debney
- Country of origin: United States
- Original language: English

Production
- Executive producer: Noel Resnick
- Producer: James Margellos
- Cinematography: Ron Orieux
- Editor: David Berlatsky
- Running time: 84 minutes

Original release
- Network: Disney Channel
- Release: May 31, 1992

Still Not Quite Human (also known as Not Quite Human III) is a 1992 American science fiction comedy television film written and directed by Eric Luke and starring Jay Underwood and Alan Thicke. It is the third and final film in a series based on the Not Quite Human novels by Seth McEvoy. The story, which has a darker tone than the previous films, features the human-looking android, Chip, embarking on a mission to rescue his father, who has been kidnapped by a ruthless tycoon to acquire his knowledge of android technology. Robyn Lively does not reprise her role as Becky, but is mentioned briefly.

== Plot ==
Dr. Jonas Carson goes to a robotics convention with Chip and an inferior model to test whether or not the world is ready for the idea of living with androids as he does with Chip. When his other android fails, Jonas becomes the subject of ridicule and nearly reveals Chip's status in order to save face, but stops himself, choosing to accept the loss of credibility over the loss of the trust Chip has placed in him. However, Jonas is kidnapped by hired goons of Dr. Frederick Berrigon, and replaced by a look-alike android. His android son, Chip, notices the swap and manages to reprogram the impostor into an ally. Since he is like an additional Jonas, Chip names him Bonus.

Chip enlists the aid of a small-time pickpocket, Kyle, whom he has just befriended, to help him rescue his father. Bonus is able to lead them to the mansion where Dr. Carson is being held, but tight security prevents them from sneaking in successfully. Chip meets up with Kate Morgan, who is a policewoman. Officer Morgan has been after Kyle's pickpocketing and illicit watch sales for some time, but agrees to not press charges if he helps Chip rescue Jonas. She devises a plan to assume the personas of wealthy investors in order to gain willful entry to Dr. Berrigon's estate, seeking guidance from her rich Aunt Mildred to prepare them.

Their ploy gets them inside, but they are soon found snooping, so Kate, Kyle, and Bonus keep the guards occupied while Chip finds his father. Just before he breaks into the room where his father is being held, Chip learns that Berrigon was trying to extract Dr. Carson's knowledge to aid in building a war machine android. A moment later, Chip is confronted by a working prototype and is forced to fight it, with Berrigon watching from a distance. Chip has to avoid its laserfire, initially, but he manages to smash the laser with a projectile. The battle becomes a contest of speed and raw strength, with Chip being knocked to the ground and nearly struck in the chest with the end of a metal rod. Chip scrambles up, sets a compressed hydrogen canister on a cart, and smashes the valve off, causing it to speed toward the other android and smash it against a group of canisters, which explode.

Berrigon, having witnessed Chip's victory, realizes that he must be Dr. Carson's android, but Chip flings him into a mud pond. When several policemen follow Kate to make the arrest, a disheveled and frantic Berrigon yells for them to arrest Chip on account of him being an android; unconvinced, they haul him away. Kate gets a promotion to "petty theft", promising to turn Kyle into an honest man. Aunt Mildred, who is attracted to Bonus, starts a relationship with him. Chip and Jonas, who reflects on why he made Chip in the first place, gratefully head home.

== Cast ==
- Jay Underwood as Chip Carson
- Alan Thicke as Dr. Jonas Carson / Bonus
- Adam Philipson as Kyle Roberts
- Rosa Nevin as Officer Kate Morgan
- Christopher Neame as Dr. Frederick Berrigon
- Ken Pogue as Bundy, Berrigon's Butler
- Sheelah Megill as Miss Prism
- Betsy Palmer as Aunt Mildred
