= Jay Underwood =

American actor and pastor

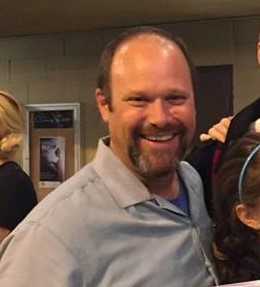
- Born: October 1, 1968 (age 58); Hayward, California, United States
- Occupation: Retired Actor
- Years active: 1986–present

Jay Underwood (born October 1, 1968) is an American actor. Beginning a prolific career as a teen actor in the mid-1980s, he is perhaps best known for his starring feature film roles; portraying Eric Gibb in The Boy Who Could Fly, Chip Carson in Not Quite Human, Grover Dunn in The Invisible Kid, Sonny Bono in The Sonny and Cher Story, Bug in Uncle Buck, and Ernest Hemingway in The Young Indiana Jones Chronicles. He also portrayed the Human Torch in the 1994 unreleased film Fantastic Four.

== Career ==
In 2001, Underwood was honored by the Young Artist Foundation with its Former Child Star "Lifetime Achievement" Award for his role in The Boy Who Could Fly. Subsequently, Underwood appeared in the feature film No Greater Love, released in 2010.

Underwood worked for Calvary Bible Church in Burbank, California as junior high pastor from August 2005 to June 2007 while attending The Master's Seminary, and was the full-time pastor of First Baptist Church of Weaverville, California from 2007 to 2020. As of January 1, 2021, Jay returned to Calvary Bible Church in Burbank and is currently Lead Pastor and Elder.

== Partial filmography ==
- 1986 Desert Bloom as Robin
- 1986 The Boy Who Could Fly as Eric
- 1987 Not Quite Human (TV movie) as Chip Carson
- 1987 Promised Land as Circle K Clerk
- 1988 The Invisible Kid as Grover Dunn
- 1989 Uncle Buck as 'Bug'
- 1989 Not Quite Human II (TV Movie) as Chip Carson
- 1989 21 Jump Street (TV Series) as Rob Daniels
- 1990 Blind Faith (TV Mini-Series) as Chris Marshall
- 1990 The Gumshoe Kid as Jeff Sherman
- 1990 The Adventures of Ford Fairlane as Club Guy Bob (uncredited)
- 1991 Son of Darkness: To Die for II as Danny
- 1992 Still Not Quite Human (TV Movie) as Chip Carson
- 1993 The Young Indiana Jones Chronicles (TV Series) as Ernest Hemingway
- 1994 The Fantastic Four as Johnny Storm / Human Torch
- 1994 Stalked as Daryl Gleeson
- 1994 The Raffle as Wilson Lowe
- 1995 Sleepstalker as Griffin Davis
- 1995 A Reason to Believe as Jim Curran
- 1996 Star Command (TV Movie) as Ensign Ken Oort
- 1996 The Lord Protector as Priamus
- 1997 The Nurse as John Beecher
- 1997 Afterglow as Donald Duncan
- 1998 Possums as John Clark
- 1998 Fatal Affair as Ezra Tyler
- 1999 Valerie Flake as Tim Darnell
- 1999 The Beat Goes On: The Sonny & Cher Story (TV movie) as Sonny Bono
- 1999 Dead Dogs as Derek
- 1999 The West Wing as Congressman Chris Wick
- 2000 Dancing in September as Michael Daniels
- 2000 The Girls' Room as Shepp
- 2000 Star Trek: Voyager (Episode: "Good Shepherd") as Mortimer Harren
- 2001 Road to Redemption as Alan Fischer
- 2001 The X-Files (Episode: Empedocles) as Jeb Dukes
- 2001 Legend of the Candy Cane (TV movie) as Chester (voice)
- 2004 Win a Date with Tad Hamilton! as Police Officer Tom
- 2005 Annie's Point (TV movie) as Police Officer
- 2006 Where There's a Will (TV movie) as Jimmy Ray
- 2010 No Greater Love as Dave
- 2016 Drift (Short) as Dad
- 2016 Surge of Power: Revenge of the Sequel as Cross
- 2019 Surge of Dawn as Cross
- 2025 The Fantastic Four: First Steps as Power Plant Worker #1
