= Not Quite Human 2 =

1989 American television film

- Official release poster
- Based on: Not Quite Human by Seth McEvoy
- Written by: Eric Luke
- Directed by: Eric Luke
- Starring: Alan Thicke; Robyn Lively; Greg Mullavy; Kate Barberi; Dey Young; Scott Nell; Jay Underwood
- Music by: Michel Rubini
- Country of origin: United States
- Original language: English

Production
- Producer: James Margellos
- Cinematography: Jules Brenner
- Running time: 91 minutes

Original release
- Release: September 23, 1989

Not Quite Human 2 is a 1989 American science fiction comedy television film written and directed by Eric Luke and starring Jay Underwood, Alan Thicke, and Robyn Lively. As the second of three films in a series based on the Not Quite Human novels by Seth McEvoy, it follows the social development of an android that is designed to appear human, this time as he enrolls in college and is on his own for the first time. The filming locations were Arizona State University, Tempe High School, Tempe, Scottsdale, and Phoenix.

== Plot ==
The film begins with Chip, the android, installing specially-ordered software designed to enhance his facial expressions; it is later discovered that he also inadvertently intakes a computer virus that causes him to malfunction very gradually, diminishing control over his own system's functions. Initially, the virus simply causes Chip to have momentary memory lapses resulting in poor judgment, but within five days it will completely destroy his internal systems, and destroy him. That same day, Dr. Jonas Carson and his daughter, Becky, attend Chip's high school graduation. Chip mentions that he wants to attend college and has already signed up for the summer session; however, his father does not feel Chip is ready to be on his own. Becky later manages to persuade her dad to grant Chip's request, pointing out that college is the natural next step in Chip's development.

Since Dr. Carson only reluctantly agreed to allow Chip to attend college, he and Becky secretly follow him to the school in a vehicle that is set up as a monitoring station in order to watch from a distance. At school, Chip sees a girl in a lab coat passing through the hall of the science building and becomes infatuated with her. Chip gets help from his roommate to try to fit in better socially at school, but Chip manages to alienate himself from a popular girl and from his roommate because of his awkwardness. Symptoms from the virus also hinder his progress.

When Chip feels homesick and calls his dad, his dad advises that he go after something that really interests him. The next day, Chip follows the girl in the lab coat, Roberta, into the robotics lab and asks her out on a date, where she informs Chip that she is an android. Excited by this revelation, Chip tells her that he is also an android. Chip soon learns that Roberta is not able to decide anything for herself, so he introduces her to the concept of free will by reprogramming her. When Roberta chooses to go with Chip instead of returning to Dr. Phil Masters and the other scientists who developed her, the two of them are forced to flee. Prof. Victoria Gray discovers that her fellow scientists are responsible for distributing a virus designed to disable competitors' androids, so she joins Dr. Carson in trying to catch up with Chip to provide the counter agent.

After being relentlessly pursued a great distance, Chip and Roberta finally manage to escape the scientists, and they are surrounded by desert when Roberta explains that running has used up almost all of her power. With the virus's effects growing more pronounced, Chip is unable to control his body very effectively as he carries Roberta and desperately searches for a power outlet to recharge her. Not finding an adequate power source, Chip slumps to the ground as the virus overtakes him, saying haltingly to Roberta, "I... love... you". Dr. Carson and Becky arrive just a moment later with Prof. Gray, and they manage to successfully administer the antidote just before Chip's systems fail completely. Once he is fully revived, Chip reveals that he had utilized his magnetic finger to write all of Roberta's programming and memories to a diskette before she lost all power, preserving the character and personality of the girl that he had fought to protect. A photograph at the end shows the Carsons together with Roberta and Prof. Gray.

== Character development ==
In each of the three Not Quite Human films, Chip is at a distinct level of development in his social awareness. While Chip had difficulty carrying on a sensible conversation in the first film and didn't notice how people perceived him, in Not Quite Human II he communicates fairly well but just takes some statements too literally. For instance, when a pair of fellow college students invite Chip to "join" them for a game of cards, Chip responds, "Are you coming apart?" He also sometimes comes close to inadvertently revealing that he is an android, such as when he successfully chases his bus going at full speed down the road. It is this naivety and peculiarity that hinder Chip's efforts to form friendships. Chip's roommate, Brandon Wilson (Scott Nell), does his best to engage Chip in the social scene, but Chip still feels like an outsider. This is why Chip is so glad to encounter Roberta, another android who is also not very developed socially.

== Cast ==
- Jay Underwood as Chip Carson
- Alan Thicke as Dr. Jonas Carson, Chip's adoptive father
- Robyn Lively as Becky Carson, Chip's adoptive younger sister
- Greg Mullavy as Dr. Phil Masters
- Katie Barberi as Roberta
- Dey Young as Prof. Victoria Gray
- Scott Nell as Brandon Wilson, Chip's Room-Mate
- Mark Arnott as Moore, Dr. Masters' Assistant
- Mike Russell as Miller, Dr. Masters' Assistant
- Ty Miller as Austin, Bus Punk
- Eric Bruskotter as Rick, Bus Punk
