= List of American films of 1986 =

This is a list of American films released in 1986.

== Box office ==
The highest-grossing American films released in 1986, by domestic box office gross revenue, are as follows:

Highest-grossing films of 1986
Rank	Title	Distributor	Domestic gross
1	Top Gun	Paramount	$176,781,728
2	Crocodile Dundee	Paramount	$174,803,506
3	Platoon	Orion	$138,530,565
4	The Karate Kid Part II	Columbia	$115,103,979
5	Star Trek IV: The Voyage Home	Paramount	$109,713,132
6	Back to School	Orion	$91,258,000
7	Aliens	Fox	$86,160,248
8	The Golden Child	Paramount	$79,817,937
9	Ruthless People	Disney	$71,624,879
10	Ferris Bueller's Day Off	Paramount	$70,136,369

== January–March ==
Opening		Title	Production company	Cast and crew	Ref.
J A N U A R Y	3	Head Office	Tri-Star Pictures / HBO Pictures / Silver Screen Partners	Ken Finkleman (director/screenplay); Judge Reinhold, Lori-Nan Engler, Eddie Albert, Richard Masur, Rick Moranis, Don Novello, Jane Seymour, Wallace Shawn, Danny DeVito, Merritt Butrick, Ron Frazier, Michael O'Donoghue, Bruce Wagner, Ron James, John Kapelos, Brian Doyle-Murray, George Coe, Don King, Hrant Alianak, Howard Busgang, Tom Butler, Jeremiah S. Chechik, Billy Curtis, William B. Davis, Carolyn Dunn, Denis Forest, Kathleen Laskey, Michael McManus, Maxine Miller, Myron Natwick, Elizabeth Shepherd, Theresa Tova, Eric Keenleyside, Anne Lockhart, Scott Thompson	
J A N U A R Y	10	Black Moon Rising	New World Pictures	Harley Cokeliss (director); John Carpenter, William Gray, Desmond Nakano (screenplay); Tommy Lee Jones, Linda Hamilton, Robert Vaughn, Richard Jaeckel, Bubba Smith, Dan Shor, Keenan Wynn, Lee Ving, William Sanderson, Nick Cassavetes, Don Keith Opper	
J A N U A R Y	17	The Adventures of the American Rabbit	Atlantic Releasing Corporation / Clubhouse Pictures / Toei Animation	Fred Wolf, Nobutaka Nishizawa (directors); Norman Lenzer (screenplay); Barry Gordon, Laurie O'Brien, Bob Arbogast, Kenneth Mars, Pat Fraley, Russi Taylor, Bob Holt, Lorenzo Music, Hal Smith, Fred Wolf, Norm Lenzer, John Mayer, Lew Horn, Maitzi Morgan	
J A N U A R Y	17	The Adventures of Mark Twain	Clubhouse Pictures	Will Vinton (director); Susan Shadburne (screenplay); James Whitmore, Dallas McKennon, Wilf Innton, Craig Bartlett, Mark Gustafson, Michele Mariana, Gary Krug, Chris Ritchie, John Morrison, Carol Edelman, Herb Smith, Marley Stone, Wilbur Vincent, Wally Newman, Tim Conner, Todd Tolces, Billy Scream, Billy Winter, Compton Downs, Gary Thompson	
J A N U A R Y	17	The Clan of the Cave Bear	Warner Bros. Pictures / Producers Sales Organization	Michael Chapman (director); John Sayles (screenplay); Daryl Hannah, Pamela Reed, James Remar, Thomas G. Waites, Curtis Armstrong, John Doolittle, Martin Doyle, Tony Montanaro, Mike Muscat, Karen Elizabeth Austin, Janne Mortil, Lycia Naff, Penny Smith, Rory Crowley, Joey Cramer, Nicole Eggert, Paul Carafotes, Bart the Bear, Emma Floria, Mary Reid	
J A N U A R Y	17	Heathcliff: The Movie	Atlantic Releasing Corporation / Clubhouse Pictures / DIC Entertainment / LBS Communications	Bruno Bianchi (director); Alan Swayze (screenplay); Mel Blanc, Donna Christie, Jeannie Elias, Peter Cullen, Stan Jones, Marilyn Lightstone, Danny Mann, Derek McGrath, Marilyn Schreffler, Danny Wells, Ted Zeigler	
J A N U A R Y	17	Hey There, It's Yogi Bear! (re-issue)	Atlantic Releasing Corporation / Clubhouse Pictures / Hanna-Barbera	William Hanna, Joseph Barbera (directors/screenplay); Warren Foster (screenplay); Daws Butler, Don Messick, Julie Bennett, Mel Blanc, Jean Vander Pyl, J. Pat O'Malley, Hal Smith, Allan Melvin, Thurl Ravenscroft, James Darren, Bill Lee, Ernest Newton, Jackie Ward, Jonah and the Wailers	
J A N U A R Y	17	Iron Eagle	Tri-Star Pictures	Sidney J. Furie (director/screenplay); Kevin Elders (screenplay); Louis Gossett Jr., Jason Gedrick, David Suchet, Larry B. Scott, Caroline Lagerfelt, Tim Thomerson, Shawnee Smith, Melora Hardin, Lance LeGault, Robert Jayne, Jerry Levine, Robbie Rist, Michael Bowen, David Greenlee, Tom Fridley, Rob Garrison	
J A N U A R Y	17	The Longshot	Orion Pictures	Paul Bartel (director); Tim Conway (screenplay); Tim Conway, Harvey Korman, Jack Weston, Ted Wass, Stella Stevens, Anne Meara, George DiCenzo, Jorge Cervera, Jonathan Winters, Frank Bonner, Eddie Deezen, Nick Dimitri, Garry Goodrow, Edie McClurg, Joseph Ruskin, Benny Baker, Ernie Anderson, Susan Tolsky, Virginia Vincent, Dick Enberg, Paul Bartel	
J A N U A R Y	17	Troll	Empire Pictures	John Carl Buechler (director); Ed Naha (screenplay); Noah Hathaway, Michael Moriarty, Shelley Hack, Jenny Beck, Sonny Bono, Phil Fondacaro, Brad Hall, Anne Lockhart, Julia Louis-Dreyfus, Gary Sandy, June Lockhart, Giorgio Armani	
J A N U A R Y	19	Murrow	HBO Premiere Films / TAFT Entertainment Pictures / TVS Films	Jack Gold (director); Ernest Kinoy (screenplay); Daniel J. Travanti, Dabney Coleman, John McMartin, Edward Herrmann, Robert Vaughn, Kathryn Leigh Scott, David Suchet, Stephen Churchett, Martyn Stanbridge, Philip Voss, Lorelei King, Frank Dux, John Sterland, Billy J. Mitchell, Jeff Harding, Bob Sherman, Robert Arden, Harry Ditson, Lans Traverse, Christopher Muncke	
J A N U A R Y	24	My Chauffeur	Crown International Pictures	David Beaird (director/screenplay); Deborah Foreman, Sam J. Jones, Sean McClory, Howard Hesseman, E.G. Marshall, Mark Holton, Penn Jillette, Teller, Julius Harris, Laurie Main, Vance Colvig, Diana Bellamy, Leland Crooke, Robin Antin, Stan Foster, John O'Leary, Stanley Brock, Jack Stryker, Ben Slack, Elaine Wilkes, Cindy Beal, Sue Jackson, Darian Mathias, Carlton Miller	
J A N U A R Y	31	The Best of Times	Universal Pictures / Kings Road Entertainment	Roger Spottiswoode (director/screenplay); Ron Shelton (screenplay); Robin Williams, Kurt Russell, Pamela Reed, Holly Palance, Donald Moffat, Margaret Whitton, M. Emmet Walsh, Donovan Scott, R. G. Armstrong, Dub Taylor, Carl Ballantine, Kathleen Freeman, Tony Plana, Kirk Cameron, Robyn Lively, Jeff Doucette, Anne Haney, Linda Hart, Tracey Gold	
J A N U A R Y	31	Down and Out in Beverly Hills	Touchstone Pictures / Silver Screen Partners	Paul Mazursky (director/screenplay); Leon Capetanos (screenplay); Nick Nolte, Bette Midler, Richard Dreyfuss, Elizabeth Peña, Little Richard, Evan Richards, Tracy Nelson, Felton Perry	
J A N U A R Y	31	Power	20th Century Fox / Lorimar Productions	Sidney Lumet (director); David Himmelstein (screenplay); Richard Gere, Julie Christie, Gene Hackman, Kate Capshaw, Denzel Washington, E.G. Marshall, Beatrice Straight, Fritz Weaver, Michael Learned, J.T. Walsh, Matt Salinger, Polly Rowles, Tom Mardirosian, Noel Harrison, Jackson Beck, Leila Danette, Kevin Hagen, D.B. Sweeney, Jim Hartz, Roger Grimsby, Donna Hanover, Marvin Scott, E. Katherine Kerr, Margaret Hall, Brad Holbrook	
J A N U A R Y	31	Youngblood	Metro-Goldwyn-Mayer / United Artists	Peter Markle (director/screenplay); John Whitman (screenplay); Rob Lowe, Cynthia Gibb, Patrick Swayze, Ed Lauter, Eric Nesterenko, Jim Youngs, Keanu Reeves, George Finn, Fionnula Flanagan, Steve Thomas, Peter Zezel, Don Biggs, Peter Faussett, James Richmond	
F E B R U A R Y	7	F/X	Orion Pictures	Robert Mandel (director); Gregory Fleeman, Robert T. Megginson (screenplay); Bryan Brown, Brian Dennehy, Diane Venora, Cliff DeYoung, Mason Adams, Jerry Orbach, Joe Grifasi, Trey Wilson, Tom Noonan, Josie de Guzman, M'el Dowd, Roscoe Orman, Martha Gehman, Angela Bassett	
F E B R U A R Y	7	Hannah and Her Sisters	Orion Pictures	Woody Allen (director/screenplay); Woody Allen, Michael Caine, Mia Farrow, Carrie Fisher, Barbara Hershey, Lloyd Nolan, Maureen O'Sullivan, Daniel Stern, Max von Sydow, Dianne Wiest, Lewis Black, Julia Louis-Dreyfus, Christian Clemenson, Julie Kavner, J.T. Walsh, John Turturro, Rusty Magee, Sam Waterston, Richard Jenkins, Fred Melamed, Benno Schmidt, Joanna Gleason, Maria Chiara, Bobby Short, Beverly Peer, Bernie Leighton, Daisy Previn, Moses Farrow, Fletcher Previn, Soon-Yi Previn, Tony Roberts	
F E B R U A R Y	14	The Delta Force	Cannon Films / Golan-Globus	Menahem Golan (director/screenplay); James Bruner (screenplay); Chuck Norris, Lee Marvin, Martin Balsam, Joey Bishop, Kim Delaney, Robert Forster, Lainie Kazan, George Kennedy, Hanna Schygulla, Susan Strasberg, Bo Svenson, Robert Vaughn, Shelley Winters, Steve James, Shaike Ophir, Liam Neeson, Mykelti Williamson, Uri Gavriel, Chelli Goldenberg, Charles Floye, Howard Jackson, William Wallace, Jerry Weinstock, David Menahem, Avi Loziah, Adiv Gahshan, Jerry Lazarus, Natalie Roth	
F E B R U A R Y	14	Knights of the City	New World Pictures	Dominic Orlando (director); Leon Isaac Kennedy (screenplay); Leon Isaac Kennedy, Nicholas Campbell, John Mengatti, Janine Turner, Stoney Jackson, Floyd Levine, Michael Ansara	
F E B R U A R Y	14	Quicksilver	Columbia Pictures	Thomas Michael Donnelly (director/screenplay); Kevin Bacon, Jami Gertz, Paul Rodriguez, Rudy Ramos, Andrew Smith, Gerald S. O'Loughlin, Larry Fishburne, Louie Anderson, Charles McCaughan, David Harris, Whitney Kershaw, Joshua Shelley, Georgann Johnson	
F E B R U A R Y	14	TerrorVision	Empire Pictures	Ted Nicolaou (director/screenplay); Charles Band (screenplay); Diane Franklin, Gerrit Graham, Mary Woronov, Chad Allen, Jonathan Gries, Jennifer Richards, Alejandro Rey, Bert Remsen, Frank Welker, Randi Brooks, Ian Patrick Williams, Sonny Carl Davis, William Paulson, John Leamer	
F E B R U A R Y	14	Turtle Diary	The Samuel Goldwyn Company	John Irvin (director); Harold Pinter (screenplay); Glenda Jackson, Ben Kingsley, Richard Johnson, Michael Gambon, Jeroen Krabbé, Rosemary Leach, Eleanor Bron, Harriet Walter, Nigel Hawthorne, Michael Aldridge, Peter Capaldi, Harold Pinter, Bryan Pringle	
F E B R U A R Y	14	Wildcats	Warner Bros. Pictures	Michael Ritchie (director); Ezra Sacks (screenplay); Goldie Hawn, James Keach, Swoosie Kurtz, Robyn Lively, Brandy Gold, Jan Hooks, Bruce McGill, Nipsey Russell, Mykelti Williamson, Tab Thacker, Wesley Snipes, Nick Corri, Woody Harrelson, M. Emmet Walsh, LL Cool J, George Wyner, Ann Doran, Gloria Stuart, Willie J. Walton, Rodney Hill	
F E B R U A R Y	19	Parting Glances	Cinecom	Bill Sherwood (director/screenplay); Richard Ganoung, John Bolger, Steve Buscemi, Adam Nathan, Kathy Kinney, Patrick Tull, Yolande Bavan, Bob Koherr, Andre Morgan, Richard Wall, Jim Selfe, Kristin Moneagle, John Siemens, Theodore Ganger, Nada	
F E B R U A R Y	21	9½ Weeks	Metro-Goldwyn-Mayer / Producers Sales Organization	Adrian Lyne (director); Sarah Kernochan, Zalman King, Patricia Louisianna Knop (screenplay); Kim Basinger, Mickey Rourke, Margaret Whitton, David Margulies, Christine Baranski, Karen Young, Dwight Weist, Roderick Cook, William DeAcutis, Victor Truro	
F E B R U A R Y	21	The Hitcher	Tri-Star Pictures / HBO Films / Silver Screen Partners	Robert Harmon (director); Eric Red (screenplay); Rutger Hauer, C. Thomas Howell, Jeffrey DeMunn, Jennifer Jason Leigh, John M. Jackson, Billy "Green" Bush, Jack Thibeau, Armin Shimerman, Gene Davis, Jon Van Ness, Henry Darrow, Tony Epper	
F E B R U A R Y	28	House	New World Pictures	Steve Miner (director); Ethan Wiley (screenplay); William Katt, George Wendt, Richard Moll, Kay Lenz, Mary Stavin, Michael Ensign, Susan French, Felix Silla, Jerry Maren, Dino Andrade, Mindy Sterling, Alan Autry, Steven Williams, Erik Silver, Mark Silver, Peter Pitofsky, Elizabeth Barrington	
F E B R U A R Y	28	Pretty in Pink	Paramount Pictures	Howard Deutch (director); John Hughes (screenplay); Molly Ringwald, Harry Dean Stanton, Jon Cryer, Annie Potts, James Spader, Andrew McCarthy, Kate Vernon, Kristy Swanson, Andrew Dice Clay, Alexa Kenin, Dweezil Zappa, Gina Gershon, Margaret Colin, Maggie Roswell	
F E B R U A R Y	28	Salvador	Hemdale Film Corporation	Oliver Stone (director/screenplay); Richard Boyle (screenplay); James Woods, Jim Belushi, Michael Murphy, John Savage, Elpidia Carrillo, Cynthia Gibb, Tony Plana, José Carlos Ruiz	
F E B R U A R Y	28	Hollywood Vice Squad	Cinema Group	Penelope Spheeris (director); Kenneth Peters (screenplay); Ronny Cox, Frank Gorshin, Trish Van Devere, Carrie Fisher, Evan C. Kim, Joey Travolta, Cec Verrell, Leon Isaac Kennedy, Julius Harris, Marvin Kaplan, Beau Starr, Tom Everett, Robert Miano, Robin Wright, Sandie Elizabeth Crisp, H.B. Haggerty	
M A R C H	7	Care Bears Movie II: A New Generation	Columbia Pictures / Nelvana / LBS Communications / American Greetings	Dale Schott (director); Peter Sauder (screenplay); Maxine Miller, Pam Hyatt, Cree Summer, Hadley Kay, Alyson Court, Billie Mae Richards, Dan Hennessey, Bob Dermer, Chris Wiggins, Sunny Besen Thrasher, Michael Fantini, Eva Almos, Patrice Black, Nonnie Griffin, Jim Henshaw, Melleny Brown, Janet-Laine Green, Marla Lukofsky, Gloria Figura	
M A R C H	7	Desert Hearts	The Samuel Goldwyn Company / Desert Hearts Productions	Donna Deitch (director); Natalie Cooper (screenplay); Helen Shaver, Patricia Charbonneau, Audra Lindley, Andra Akers, Gwen Welles, Dean Butler, Alex McArthur, Denise Crosby, Antony Ponzini, James Staley, Katie La Bourdette, Tyler Tyhurst	
M A R C H	7	Highlander	20th Century Fox / Cannon Films	Russell Mulcahy (director); Gregory Widen, Larry Ferguson, Peter Bellwood (screenplay); Christopher Lambert, Roxanne Hart, Clancy Brown, Sean Connery, Beatie Edney, Alan North, Jon Polito, Sheila Gish, Hugh Quarshie, Christopher Malcolm, Peter Diamond, Celia Imrie, Billy Hartman, James Cosmo, Corinne Russell, Greg Gagne, Jim Brunzell, Sam Fatu, Michael Hayes, Terry Gordy, Buddy Roberts	
M A R C H	7	Nomads	Atlantic Releasing Corporation	John McTiernan (director/screenplay); Pierce Brosnan, Lesley-Anne Down, Anna-Maria Monticelli, Adam Ant, Mary Woronov, Nina Foch, Frances Bay, Frank Doubleday, Josie Cotton, Jeannie Elias, Hector Mercado	
M A R C H	7	Sleeping Beauty (re-issue)	Walt Disney Pictures	Clyde Geronimi, Wolfgang Reitherman, Eric Larson, Les Clark (directors); Erdman Penner, Joe Rinaldi, Winston Hibler, Bill Peet, Ted Sears, Ralph Wright, Milt Banta (screenplay); Mary Costa, Bill Shirley, Eleanor Audley, Verna Felton, Barbara Luddy, Barbara Jo Allen, Taylor Holmes, Bill Thompson, Bobby Amsberry, Candy Candido, Pinto Colvig, Hans Conried, Dallas McKennon, Marvin Miller, Helene Stanley, Ed Kemmer, Frances Bavier, Madge Blake, Spring Byington, Don Barclay, Jane Fowler	
M A R C H	14	Crossroads	Columbia Pictures	Walter Hill (director); John Fusco (screenplay); Ralph Macchio, Joe Seneca, Jami Gertz, Joe Morton, Steve Vai, Dennis Lipscomb, Harry Carey Jr., John Hancock, Allan Arbus, Gretchen Palmer, Tim Russ, Robert Judd, Akosua Busia, Allan Graf, Al Fann, Wally Taylor, Tex Donaldson, Guy Killum, Edward Walsh	
M A R C H	14	Gung Ho	Paramount Pictures	Ron Howard (director); Lowell Ganz, Babaloo Mandel (screenplay); Michael Keaton, Gedde Watanabe, George Wendt, John Turturro, Mimi Rogers, So Yamamura, Sab Shimono, Rick Overton, Clint Howard, Jihmi Kennedy, Michelle Johnson, Rodney Kageyama, Rance Howard, Patti Yasutake, Jerry Tondo, Robert Hammond	
M A R C H	21	GoBots: Battle of the Rock Lords	Atlantic Releasing Corporation / Clubhouse Pictures / Hanna-Barbera / Tonka Corporation	Ray Patterson (director); Jeff Segal (screenplay); Margot Kidder, Roddy McDowall, Telly Savalas, Michael Nouri, Lou Richards, Frank Welker, Arthur Burghardt, Bernard Erhard, Peter Cullen, Darryl Hickman, Dick Gautier, Michael Bell, Foster Brooks, Ken Hudson Campbell, Philip L. Clarke, Ike Eisenmann, Marilyn Lightstone, Morgan Paull, Leslie Speights, B.J. Ward, Kelly Ward, Kirby Ward	
M A R C H	21	Just Between Friends	Orion Pictures / MTM Enterprises	Allan Burns (director/screenplay); Mary Tyler Moore, Christine Lahti, Sam Waterston, Ted Danson, Mark Blum, Salome Jens, Jane Greer	
M A R C H	21	Police Academy 3: Back in Training	Warner Bros. Pictures	Jerry Paris (director); Gene Quintano (screenplay); Steve Guttenberg, Bubba Smith, David Graf, Michael Winslow, Marion Ramsey, Leslie Easterbrook, Art Metrano, Tim Kazurinsky, Bobcat Goldthwait, George Gaynes, Bruce Mahler, Lance Kinsey, Scott Thomson, Brant von Hoffman, Debralee Scott, Brian Tochi, Shawn Weatherly, David James Elliott, George R. Robertson, Ed Nelson, Georgina Spelvin, Arthur Batanides, Chas Lawther, TJ Scott, Jerry Paris, Andrew Paris, David Huband, Marcia Watkins, R. Christopher Thomas,	
M A R C H	21	Rad	Tri-Star Pictures	Hal Needham (director); Geoffrey Edwards, Sam Bernard (screenplay); Bill Allen, Lori Loughlin, Talia Shire, Ray Walston, Jack Weston, Bart Conner, H.B. Haggerty, Chad Hayes, Carey Hayes, Rick McNair, Alfie Wise, Marta Kober, Jamie Clarke, Laura Jacoby, Kellie McQuiggin, Beverly Hendry, Shawna Burnett, Graeme Davies, Logan T. Wotton, Jeff Kress, Gordon Signer, Nancy MacDonald, Christian Roerig	
M A R C H	23	Dallas: The Early Years	CBS / Lorimar Television / Roundelay Productions	Larry Elikann (director); David Jacobs (screenplay); David Grant, Dale Midkiff, Molly Hagan, Hoyt Axton, Larry Hagman, Bill Duke, Geoffrey Lewis, Diane Franklin, Marshall Thompson, William Frankfather, Wendel Meldrum, Liz Keifer, Matt Mulhern, Blue Deckert, David Wilson, Joe Rainer, Marjie Rynearson, Davis Roberts, Kevin Wixted, Joe Berryman, Angie Bolling, Cynthia Dorn, Norma Moore, Terrence Riggins, Ryan Beadle, Johnny Felder, Lee Gideon, Max Harvey, Rhashell Hunter, Bennie Moore, Debra Lynn Rogeras, Andrea Wauters, Bethany Wright, Joel Allen	
M A R C H	26	The Money Pit	Universal Pictures / Amblin Entertainment	Richard Benjamin (director); David Giler (screenplay); Tom Hanks, Shelley Long, Alexander Godunov, Maureen Stapleton, Joe Mantegna, Philip Bosco, Frankie Faison, Josh Mostel, Yakov Smirnoff, Carmine Caridi, Brian Backer, Mia Dillon, John van Dreelen, Douglass Watson, Tetchie Agbayani, Michael Jeter, Wendell Pierce, Henry Judd Baker, Mary Louise Wilson, Mike Starr, Jake Steinfeld, Matthew Cowles, Nestor Serrano, Afemo Omilami, Ron Foster, Tzi Ma, Leslie West, White Lion, Robey	
M A R C H	28	Lucas	20th Century Fox	David Seltzer (director/screenplay); Corey Haim, Charlie Sheen, Kerri Green, Courtney Thorne-Smith, Winona Ryder, Jeremy Piven, Tom Hodges, Ciro Poppiti, Guy Boyd, Garrett M. Brown, Gary Cole	

== April–June ==
Opening		Title	Production company	Cast and crew	Ref.
A P R I L	11	Band of the Hand	Tri-Star Pictures	Paul Michael Glaser (director); Leo Garen, Jack Baran (screenplay); Stephen Lang, James Remar, Leon Robinson, Larry Fishburne, Michael Carmine, John Cameron Mitchell, Danny Quinn, Lauren Holly, Al Shannon	
A P R I L	11	Critters	New Line Cinema	Stephen Herek (director/screenplay); Domonic Muir (screenplay); Dee Wallace, M. Emmet Walsh, Billy "Green" Bush, Scott Grimes, Nadine van der Velde, Don Keith Opper, Lin Shaye, Billy Zane, Ethan Phillips, Terrence Mann, Jeremy Lawrence	
A P R I L	11	Off Beat	Touchstone Pictures / Silver Screen Partners	Michael Dinner (director); Mark Medoff (screenplay); Judge Reinhold, Meg Tilly, John Turturro, Cleavant Derricks, Jacques d'Amboise, Harvey Keitel, Joe Mantegna, Amy Wright, Anthony Zerbe, Julie Bovasso, Penn Jillette, Mel Winkler, Irving Metzman, Mike Starr, Shawn Elliott, Stanley Simmonds, Nancy Giles, Paul Butler, John Kapelos, Bill Sadler, Christopher Noth, Austin Pendleton	
A P R I L	11	A Room with a View	Curzon Film Distributors / Merchant Ivory Productions / Goldcrest Films / Film Four International	James Ivory (director); Ruth Prawer Jhabvala (screenplay); Helena Bonham Carter, Julian Sands, Maggie Smith, Denholm Elliott, Daniel Day-Lewis, Simon Callow, Rosemary Leach, Rupert Graves, Patrick Godfrey, Judi Dench, Fabia Drake, Joan Henley, Amanda Walker, Maria Britneva, Mia Fothergill, Peter Cellier	
A P R I L	18	Absolute Beginners	Palace Pictures / Goldcrest Films / Virgin Films	Julien Temple (director); Richard Burridge, Christopher Wicking, Don Macpherson (screenplay); Eddie O'Connell, Patsy Kensit, David Bowie, James Fox, Ray Davies, Anita Morris, Steven Berkoff, Sade, Edward Tudor-Pole, Graham Fletcher-Cook, Tony Hippolyte, Bruce Payne, Paul Rhys, Lionel Blair, Eve Ferret, Mandy Rice-Davies, Julian Firth, Alan Freeman, Chris Pitt, Gary Beadle, Robbie Coltrane, Carmen Ejogo, Ronald Fraser, Joe McKenna, Irene Handl, Peter-Hugo Daly, Sylvia Sims, Slim Gaillard, Jess Conrad, Smiley Culture, Amanda Jane Powell, Johnny Shannon, Colin Jeavons, Sandie Shaw, Bruno Tonioli, Eric Sykes	
A P R I L	18	At Close Range	Orion Pictures	James Foley (director); Nicholas Kazan (screenplay); Sean Penn, Christopher Walken, Mary Stuart Masterson, Crispin Glover, Tracey Walter, Christopher Penn, Millie Perkins, Eileen Ryan, Kiefer Sutherland, R.D. Call, David Strathairn, J.C. Quinn, Candy Clark, Jake Dengel, Stephen Geoffreys, Alan Autry, Noelle Parker	
A P R I L	18	Desert Bloom	Columbia Pictures / Carson Productions	Eugene Corr (director/screenplay); Linda Remy (screenplay); Jon Voight, JoBeth Williams, Ellen Barkin, Allen Garfield, Annabeth Gish, Jay Underwood, Ann Risley, Desiree Joseph, Dusty Balcerzak, Tressi Loria, Laura Rasmussen, William Lang, Jim McCarthy	
A P R I L	18	Murphy's Law	Cannon Films	J. Lee Thompson (director); Gail Morgan Hickman (screenplay); Charles Bronson, Carrie Snodgress, Robert F. Lyons, Richard Romanus, Kathleen Wilhoite, Angel Tompkins, Bill Henderson, James Luisi, Janet MacLachlan, Lawrence Tierney, Clifford A. Pellow, Don Brodie	
A P R I L	18	Wise Guys	MGM Entertainment Co.	Brian De Palma (director); George Gallo, Norman Steinberg (screenplay); Danny DeVito, Joe Piscopo, Harvey Keitel, Ray Sharkey, Dan Hedaya, Captain Lou Albano, Julie Bovasso, Patti LuPone, Antonia Rey, Matthew Kaye, Frank Vincent, Anthony Holland, Dan Resin, Jill Larson, Maria Pitillo, Catherine Scorsese, Charles Scorsese, Mimi Cecchini, Tony Munafo, Tony Rizzoli, Rick Petrucelli	
A P R I L	20	Act of Vengeance	HBO Premiere Films / Lorimar Telepictures / Telepictures Productions / Frank Konigsberg Productions / Telepix Canada Corp.	John Mackenzie (director); Scott Spencer (screenplay); Charles Bronson, Ellen Burstyn, Wilford Brimley, Hoyt Axton, Robert Schenkkan, Ellen Barkin, Maury Chaykin, Caroline Kava, Peg Murray, William Newman, Alan North, Raynor Scheine, Gordon Woolvett, Alf Humphreys, Joseph Kell, Ken Pogue, Keanu Reeves, Marc Strange, Chuck Shamata, Pam Hyatt, Scott Spencer	
A P R I L	25	8 Million Ways to Die	Tri-Star Pictures / Producers Sales Organization	Hal Ashby (director); Oliver Stone, R. Lance Hill (screenplay); Jeff Bridges, Rosanna Arquette, Alexandra Paul, Andy García, Randy Brooks, Tom Lister Jr., Wilfredo Hernández, Luisa Leschin, Vyto Ruginis, James Avery, Lisa Sloan, Christa Denton, Vance Valencia, Henry O. Arnold	
A P R I L	25	Crimewave	Columbia Pictures	Sam Raimi (director/screenplay); Joel Coen, Ethan Coen (screenplay); Louise Lasser, Paul L. Smith, Brion James, Sheree J. Wilson, Edward R. Pressman, Bruce Campbell, Reed Birney, Antonio Fargas, Richard Bright, Richard DeManicor, Emil Sitka, Wiley Harker, Robert Symonds, Frances McDormand, Ted Raimi, Ethan Coen, Joel Coen, Rob Tapert, Julie Harris	
A P R I L	25	Violets Are Blue	Columbia Pictures / Rastar	Jack Fisk (director); Naomi Foner Gyllenhaal (screenplay); Sissy Spacek, Kevin Kline, Bonnie Bedelia, John Kellogg, Augusta Dabney, Mike Starr, Jim Standiford, Kate McGregor-Stewart, Annalee Jeffries, Adrian Sparks	
M A Y	2	Blue City	Paramount Pictures	Michelle Manning (director); Lukas Heller, Walter Hill (screenplay); Judd Nelson, Ally Sheedy, David Caruso, Paul Winfield, Scott Wilson, Anita Morris, Luis Contreras, Julie Carmen, Tommy Lister, Jr., Willard E. Pugh, Sam Whipple, Paddi Edwards, Rick Hurst, Allan Graf, Hank Stone, Rex Ryon, The Textones	
M A Y	2	Jo Jo Dancer, Your Life Is Calling	Columbia Pictures	Richard Pryor (director/screenplay); Rocco Urbisci, Paul Mooney (screenplay); Richard Pryor, Paula Kelly, Art Evans, Barbara Williams, Fay Hauser, Billy Eckstine, Diahnne Abbott, Carmen McRae, Debbie Allen, Tanya Boyd, Wings Hauser, Michael Ironside, Scoey Mitchell, Mike Genovese, Marlene Warfield, Virginia Capers, Dennis Farina, Frederick Coffin, Ken Foree, Beau Starr, Dennis Hayden, E'Lon Cox	
M A Y	2	No Retreat, No Surrender	New World Pictures / Balcor Film Investors / Seasonal Films	Corey Yuen (director); Keith W. Strandberg (screenplay); Kurt McKinney, Jean-Claude Van Damme, Tai-chung Kim, Peter "Sugarfoot" Cunningham, J.W. Fails, Kathie Sileno, Kent Lipham, Ron Pohnel, Dale Jacoby, Joe Verroca, John Andes, Farid Panali, Mark Zacharatos, Ty Martinez, Timothy D. Baker, Gloria Marziano, Paul Oswell	
M A Y	2	Saving Grace	Columbia Pictures / Embassy Pictures	Robert M. Young (director); Richard Kramer, David S. Ward (screenplay); Tom Conti, Fernando Rey, Erland Josephson, Giancarlo Giannini, Donald Hewlett, Patricia Mauceri, Edward James Olmos, Marta Zoffoli	
M A Y	9	Dangerously Close	Cannon Films	Albert Pyun (director); John Stockwell, Scott Fields, Marty Ross (screenplay); John Stockwell, Carey Lowell, Madison Mason, Bradford Bancroft, J. Eddie Peck	
M A Y	9	Fire with Fire	Paramount Pictures	Duncan Gibbins (director); Warren Skaaren, Ben Phillips, Paul Boorstin, Sharon Boorstin (screenplay); Virginia Madsen, Craig Sheffer, Kate Reid, Jon Polito, J.J. Cohen, Jean Smart, Tim Russ, Kari Wuhrer, D.B. Sweeney, Ann Savage, David Harris	
M A Y	9	Last Resort	Concorde Pictures	Zane Buzby (director); Jeff Buhai, Steve Zacharias (screenplay); Charles Grodin, Megan Mullally, John Ashton, Brenda Bakke, Gerrit Graham, Phil Hartman, Chip Johannessen, Steve Levitt, Jon Lovitz, David Mirkin, Mario Van Peebles, Jacob Vargas, Buck Young, Zane Buzby, Ian Abercrombie, Scott Nemes, Robin Pearson Rose, Christopher Ames, Ellen Blake, Michael Markowitz, Brett Baxter Clark	
M A Y	9	Short Circuit	Tri-Star Pictures / Producers Sales Organization	John Badham (director); S. S. Wilson, Brent Maddock (screenplay); Ally Sheedy, Steve Guttenberg, Fisher Stevens, Austin Pendleton, G.W. Bailey, Brian McNamara, Tim Blaney, Marvin J. McIntyre, John Garber, Penny Santon, Vernon Weddle, Barbara Tarbuck, Jack Thompson, Jack Angel, Cam Clarke, Don Messick, John Badham, Sergio Kato	
M A Y	14	Sweet Liberty	Universal Pictures	Alan Alda (director/screenplay); Alan Alda, Michael Caine, Michelle Pfeiffer, Bob Hoskins, Lise Hilboldt, Lillian Gish, Saul Rubinek, Lois Chiles, Linda Thorson	
M A Y	16	Hard Choices	Lorimar-Telepictures	Rick King (director/screenplay); Margaret Klenck, John Sayles, John Seitz, J.T. Walsh, John Snyder, Martin Donovan, Spalding Gray	
M A Y	16	Top Gun	Paramount Pictures / Jerry Bruckheimer	Tony Scott (director); Jim Cash, Jack Epps Jr. (screenplay); Tom Cruise, Kelly McGillis, Val Kilmer, Anthony Edwards, Tom Skerritt, Michael Ironside, John Stockwell, Barry Tubb, Rick Rossovich, Tim Robbins, James Tolkan, Meg Ryan, Clarence Gilyard, Whip Hubley, Adrian Pasdar	
M A Y	18	As Summers Die	HBO Premiere Films / Lorimar Telepictures	Jean-Claude Tramont (director); Jeff Andrus (screenplay); Scott Glenn, Jamie Lee Curtis, Bette Davis, John Randolph, Beah Richards, Ron O'Neal, Bruce McGill, Richard Venture, John McIntire, Penny Fuller, CCH Pounder, Ed L. Grady, Paul Roebling, Tammy Baldwin	
M A Y	21	Crawlspace	Empire Pictures	David Schmoeller (director/screenplay); Klaus Kinski, Talia Balsam, Barbara Whinnery, Carole Francis, Tané McClure, Sally Brown, Jack Heller, David Abbott, Kenneth Robert Shippy, Sherry Buchanan	
M A Y	23	Cobra	Warner Bros. Pictures / Cannon Films	George P. Cosmatos (director); Sylvester Stallone (screenplay); Sylvester Stallone, Brigitte Nielsen, Reni Santoni, Andrew Robinson, Brian Thompson, John Herzfeld, Lee Garlington, Art LaFleur, Marco Rodríguez, Val Avery, David Rasche, Nick Angotti, Harry Demopoulos	
M A Y	23	Poltergeist II: The Other Side	Metro-Goldwyn-Mayer	Brian Gibson (director); Michael Grais, Mark Victor (screenplay); JoBeth Williams, Craig T. Nelson, Heather O'Rourke, Oliver Robins, Julian Beck, Zelda Rubinstein, Will Sampson, Geraldine Fitzgerald, Noble Craig, Susan Peretz, Jaclyn Bernstein, Hayley Taylor, Pamela Gordon, Whitby Hertford, Corey Burton	
M A Y	30	Big Trouble	Columbia Pictures / Delphi III Productions	John Cassavetes (director); Warren Bogle (screenplay); Peter Falk, Alan Arkin, Beverly D'Angelo, Charles Durning, Robert Stack, Paul Dooley, Valerie Curtin, Richard Libertini, John Finnegan, Maryedith Burrell, Rosemarie Stack, Barbara Tarbuck, Warren Munson, Al White, Teddy Wilson, Jaime Sánchez, Steve Alterman, Jerry Pavlon, Paul La Greca, Edith Fields, Gloria Gifford	
M A Y	30	A Great Wall	Orion Classics	Peter Wang (director); Shirley Sun, Peter Wang (screenplay); Peter Wang, Kelvin Han Yee, Sharon Iwai	
J U N E	6	Invaders from Mars	Cannon Films	Tobe Hooper (director); Dan O'Bannon, Don Jakoby (screenplay); Karen Black, Hunter Carson, Timothy Bottoms, Laraine Newman, James Karen, Bud Cort, Louise Fletcher, Jimmy Hunt, Eric Pierpoint, Christopher Allport, Tony Cox	
J U N E	6	My Little Pony: The Movie	De Laurentiis Entertainment Group / Hasbro / Sunbow Productions / Toei Animation	Michael Joens (director); George Arthur Bloom (screenplay); Cloris Leachman, Danny DeVito, Rhea Perlman, Madeline Kahn, Tony Randall, Charlie Adler, Russi Taylor, Nancy Cartwright, Cathy Cavadini, Katie Leigh, Alice Playten, Jon Bauman, Michael Bell, Susan Blu, Peter Cullen, Laura Dean, Ellen Gerstell, Scott Menville, Frank Welker, Tammy Amerson, Sheryl Bernstein, Keri Houlihan, Laurel Page, Sarah Partridge, Jill Wayne	
J U N E	6	Raw Deal	De Laurentiis Entertainment Group / Embassy Pictures	John Irvin (director); Gary DeVore, Norman Wexler (screenplay); Arnold Schwarzenegger, Kathryn Harrold, Darren McGavin, Sam Wanamaker, Paul Shenar, Steven Hill, Ed Lauter, Joe Regalbuto, Robert Davi, Blanche Baker, Louise Robey, Mordecai Lawner, Victor Argo, George P. Wilbur, Gary Houston, Dick Durock, Thomas Rosales Jr., Ralph Foody, Sven-Ole Thorsen, Denver Mattson, John Malloy, Steve Holt, Frank Ferrara, Jack Hallett, Jay Butler, Tony DiBenedetto, Tom Hull, James Eric	
J U N E	6	SpaceCamp	20th Century Fox / ABC Motion Pictures	Harry Winer (director); Clifford Green, Casey T. Mitchell (screenplay); Kate Capshaw, Lea Thompson, Kelly Preston, Larry B. Scott, Joaquin Phoenix, Tate Donovan, Tom Skerritt, Barry Primus, Terry O'Quinn, Mitchell Anderson, Scott Coffey, Kevin Gage, Frank Welker, Pamela Adlon	
J U N E	11	Ferris Bueller's Day Off	Paramount Pictures	John Hughes (director/screenplay); Matthew Broderick, Alan Ruck, Mia Sara, Jennifer Grey, Jeffrey Jones, Lyman Ward, Cindy Pickett, Edie McClurg, Ben Stein, Charlie Sheen, Del Close, Virginia Capers, Richard Edson, Larry "Flash" Jenkins, Kristy Swanson, Max Perlich, Scott Coffey, Eric Saiet, Jonathan Schmock, Joey D. Vieira, Louie Anderson, Stephanie Blake, Dee Dee Rescher, John Hughes	
J U N E	13	Back to School	Orion Pictures	Alan Metter (director); Steven Kampmann, Peter Torokvei, Harold Ramis, Will Porter (screenplay); Rodney Dangerfield, Sally Kellerman, Burt Young, Keith Gordon, Robert Downey Jr., Paxton Whitehead, Terry Farrell, M. Emmet Walsh, Adrienne Barbeau, William Zabka, Ned Beatty, Severn Darden, Sam Kinison, Robert Picardo, Kurt Vonnegut Jr., Edie McClurg, Kimberlin Brown, Jason Hervey, Michael McGrady, Timothy Stack, Steve Sweeney, Oingo Boingo, David L. Snyder	
J U N E	13	Belizaire the Cajun	Skouras Pictures	Glen Pitre (director/screenplay); Armand Assante, Gail Youngs, Michael Schoeffling, Stephen McHattie, Will Patton, Nancy Barrett, Loulan Pitre, Sr., Paul Landry, Robert Duvall, Bob Edmundson, Andre Delaunay, Jim Levert, Ernie Vincent, Allan Durand, Charlie Goulas	
J U N E	13	The Manhattan Project	20th Century Fox	Marshall Brickman (director/screenplay); Thomas Baum (screenplay); John Lithgow, Christopher Collet, Cynthia Nixon, John Mahoney, Jill Eikenberry, Robert Sean Leonard, Richard Jenkins, Gregg Edelman	
J U N E	13	Mona Lisa	Island Pictures / HandMade Films	Neil Jordan (director/screenplay); David Leland (screenplay); Bob Hoskins, Cathy Tyson, Robbie Coltrane, Michael Caine, Clarke Peters, Kate Hardie, Zoe Nathenson, Sammi Davis, Rod Bedall, Joe Brown, Pauline Melville, Hossein Karimbeik, Maggie O'Neill, Bryan Coleman, Robert Dorning, Perry Fenwick, John Darling	
J U N E	13	Never Too Young to Die	Paul Entertainment	Gil Bettman (director/screenplay); Steven Paul, Anthony Foutz (screenplay); John Stamos, Vanity, Gene Simmons, George Lazenby, Robert Englund, John Anderson, Branscombe Richmond, Peter Kwong, Ed Brock, Randy Hall	
J U N E	18	Legal Eagles	Universal Pictures	Ivan Reitman (director); Jim Cash, Jack Epps Jr. (screenplay); Robert Redford, Debra Winger, Daryl Hannah, Brian Dennehy, Terence Stamp, Steven Hill, Christine Baranski, Roscoe Lee Browne, David Clennon, John McMartin, Robert Curtis Brown, Grant Heslov, Sara Botsford, Jennifer Dundas, David Hart, James Hurdle, Gary Howard Klar, Christian Clemenson, Bruce French, Lynn Hamilton, Brian Doyle-Murray, Burke Byrnes, Bart Burns, Paul Jabara, Kristine Sutherland, Vincent Guastaferro, Ron Foster, Jay Thomas, Alex Nevil, Lou Cutell, Liz Sheridan, Marshall Bell	
J U N E	20	The Karate Kid Part II	Columbia Pictures	John G. Avildsen (director); Robert Mark Kamen (screenplay); Ralph Macchio, Pat Morita, Nobu McCarthy, Tamlyn Tomita, Yuji Okumoto, Joey Miyashima, Marc Hayashi, Danny Kamekona, Tony O'Dell, Martin Kove, William Zabka, Ron Thomas, Rob Garrison, B.D. Wong, Clarence Gilyard	
J U N E	27	American Anthem	Columbia Pictures / Lorimar Motion Pictures	Albert Magnoli (director); Evan Archerd, Jeff Benjamin (screenplay); Mitch Gaylord, Janet Jones, Michael Pataki, Patrice Donnelly, R.J. Williams, John Aprea, Michelle Phillips, Jenny Ester, Megan Marsden, Li Yuejiu, Tiny Wells, Kathrine Godney, Stacy Maloney, Peter Tramm, Maria Anz, Andrew White, Dick McGarvin, Mark Oates, Jan Claire, Googy Gress	
J U N E	27	Labyrinth	Tri-Star Pictures / The Jim Henson Company / Lucasfilm	Jim Henson (director); Terry Jones (screenplay); David Bowie, Jennifer Connelly, Toby Froud, Christopher Malcolm, Shelley Thompson, Natalie Finland, Michael Moschen, Brian Henson, Ron Mueck, Dave Goelz, David Barclay, David Shaughnessy, Karen Prell, Timothy Bateson, Frank Oz, Michael Hordern, Denise Bryer, Steve Whitmire, Anthony Jackson, Kevin Clash, Douglas Blackwell, Anthony Asbury, David Healy, Robert Beatty, Toby Philpott, Charles Augins, Cheryl Henson, Danny John-Jules, Richard Bodkin, Percy Edwards, Don Austen, Ronnie Le Drew, Kathryn Mullen, Nigel Plaskitt, Michael Quinn, David Rudman, Robin Stevens, Mak Wilson, Francis Wright, Sean Barrett, John Bluthal, Steve Nallon, Jan Ravens, Enn Reitel, Kerry Shale, Kenny Baker, Warwick Davis, Malcolm Dixon	
J U N E	27	Running Scared	Metro-Goldwyn-Mayer	Peter Hyams (director); Gary DeVore, Jimmy Huston (screenplay); Gregory Hines, Billy Crystal, Steven Bauer, Darlanne Fluegel, Joe Pantoliano, Dan Hedaya, Jon Gries, Tracy Reed, Jimmy Smits, John DiSanti, Larry Hankin, Don Calfa, Robert Lesser, Deanna Dunagan, Stephen Burrows, Luis Contreras, Al Leong	
J U N E	27	Ruthless People	Touchstone Pictures / Silver Screen Partners	David Zucker, Jim Abrahams, Jerry Zucker (directors); Dale Launer (screenplay); Danny DeVito, Judge Reinhold, Helen Slater, Bette Midler, Anita Morris, Bill Pullman, William G. Schilling, Art Evans, Clarence Felder, J.E. Freeman, Gary Riley, Susan Marie Snyder, Jim Doughan, Frank Sivero, Bob Tzudiker, Charlotte Zucker, Phil Hartman, Vince McMahon, George "The Animal" Steele	

== July–September ==
Opening		Title	Production company	Cast and crew	Ref.
J U L Y	2	About Last Night	Tri-Star Pictures	Edward Zwick (director); Tim Kazurinsky, Denise DeClue (screenplay); Rob Lowe, Demi Moore, Jim Belushi, Elizabeth Perkins, George DiCenzo, Robin Thomas, Megan Mullally, Sachi Parker, Rosanna DeSoto, Catherine Keener, Ada Maris, Joe Greco, Robert Neches	
J U L Y	2	Big Trouble in Little China	20th Century Fox	John Carpenter (director); Gary Goldman, David Z. Weinstein, W.D. Richter (screenplay); Kurt Russell, Kim Cattrall, Dennis Dun, James Hong, Victor Wong, Kate Burton, Donald Li, Carter Wong, Peter Kwong, James Pax, Suzee Pai, Chao-Li Chi, Jeff Imada, Al Leong, Gerald Okamura, Nathan Jung, Lia Chang, Cary-Hiroyuki Tagawa, Frank Ho, James Lew, Noble Craig	
J U L Y	2	The Great Mouse Detective	Walt Disney Pictures	Ron Clements, Burny Mattinson, Dave Michener, John Musker (directors/screenplay); Matthew O'Callaghan, Mel Shaw, Pete Young, Vance Gerry, Steve Hulett, Bruce Morris (screenplay); Vincent Price, Barrie Ingham, Val Bettin, Susanne Pollatschek, Candy Candido, Alan Young, Diana Chesney, Eve Brenner, Frank Welker, Basil Rathbone, Laurie Main, Wayne Allwine, Tony Anselmo, Walker Edmiston, Melissa Manchester	
J U L Y	2	Psycho III	Universal Pictures	Anthony Perkins (director); Charles Edward Pogue (screenplay); Anthony Perkins, Diana Scarwid, Jeff Fahey, Roberta Maxwell, Hugh Gillin, Robert Alan Browne, Lee Garlington, Donovan Scott, Karen Hensel, Jack Murdock, Katt Shea, Janet Leigh, Claudia Bryar, Gary Bayer, Juliette Cummins	
J U L Y	2	Under the Cherry Moon	Warner Bros. Pictures	Prince (director); Becky Johnston (screenplay); Prince, Jerome Benton, Kristin Scott Thomas, Steven Berkoff, Emmanuelle Sallet, Alexandra Stewart, Francesca Annis, Victor Spinetti, Myriam Tadesse, Moune De Vivier	
J U L Y	4	Howling II: Your Sister Is a Werewolf	Hemdale Film Corporation / Granite Productions	Philippe Mora (director); Robert Sarno, Gary Brandner (screenplay); Christopher Lee, Annie McEnroe, Reb Brown, Marsha Hunt, Sybil Danning, Ferdy Mayne, Jimmy Nail, Ivo Niederle, Jan Kraus, Judd Omen, Patrick Field, Ladislav Krečmer, Valerie Kaplanová	
J U L Y	11	Club Paradise	Warner Bros. Pictures	Harold Ramis (director/screenplay); Brian Doyle-Murray (screenplay); Robin Williams, Peter O'Toole, Rick Moranis, Jimmy Cliff, Twiggy, Adolph Caesar, Eugene Levy, Joanna Cassidy, Andrea Martin, Brian Doyle-Murray, Joe Flaherty, Steven Kampmann, Robin Duke, Mary Gross, Simon Jones, Louise Bennett, Ansell "Double Barrel" Cousins, Earl "Chinna" Smith, Carey Lowell, Louis Zorich, Bruce McGill, Anne Ramis	
J U L Y	11	Miracles	Orion Pictures	Jim Kouf (director/screenplay); Tom Conti, Teri Garr, Paul Rodriguez, Christopher Lloyd, Adalberto Martínez, Jorge Reynoso, Ken Lerner, Charles Rocket, Brion James, Zaide Silvia Gutiérrez, Erika Faraon, Paco Morayta, Barbara Whinnery, Squire Fridell, Ken Hixon, Jorge Russek, Shelby Leverington	
J U L Y	18	Aliens	20th Century Fox / Brandywine Productions	James Cameron (director/screenplay); Sigourney Weaver, Carrie Henn, Michael Biehn, Paul Reiser, Lance Henriksen, William Hope, Bill Paxton, Jenette Goldstein, Al Matthews, Mark Rolston, Ricco Ross, Colette Hiller, Daniel Kash, Cynthia Dale Scott, Tip Tipping, Trevor Steedman, Paul Maxwell, Carl Toop	
J U L Y	18	Vamp	New World Pictures	Richard Wenk (director/screenplay); Donald P. Borchers (screenplay); Grace Jones, Chris Makepeace, Sandy Baron, Robert Rusler, Dedee Pfeiffer, Gedde Watanabe, Billy Drago, Lisa Lyon	
J U L Y	25	Echo Park	Orion Pictures	Robert Dornhelm (director); Michael Ventura (screenplay); Susan Dey, Tom Hulce, Michael Bowen, Cheech Marin, John Paragon, Cassandra Peterson	
J U L Y	25	Haunted Honeymoon	Orion Pictures	Gene Wilder (director/screenplay); Terence Marsh (screenplay); Gene Wilder, Gilda Radner, Dom DeLuise, Jonathan Pryce, Paul L. Smith, Bryan Pringle, Peter Vaughan, Eve Ferret, Jim Carter, Jo Ross, Roger Ashton-Griffiths, Ann Way, Sally Osborne	
J U L Y	25	Heartburn	Paramount Pictures	Mike Nichols (director); Nora Ephron (screenplay); Meryl Streep, Jack Nicholson, Stockard Channing, Jeff Daniels, Miloš Forman, Steven Hill, Catherine O'Hara, Mamie Gummer, Joanna Gleason, Anna Maria Horsford, Richard Masur, Maureen Stapleton, Mercedes Ruehl, Kevin Spacey, Dana Ivey, Karen Akers, Jack Gilpin, Kenneth Welsh	
J U L Y	25	Maximum Overdrive	De Laurentiis Entertainment Group	Stephen King (director/screenplay); Emilio Estevez, Pat Hingle, Laura Harrington, Christopher Murney, Yeardley Smith, Frankie Faison, Leon Rippy, J.C. Quinn, Holter Graham, John Short, Ellen McElduff, Barry Bell, Patrick Miller, J. Don Ferguson, Giancarlo Esposito, Marla Maples, Stephen King	
J U L Y	25	Out of Bounds	Columbia Pictures	Richard Tuggle (director); Tony Kayden (screenplay); Anthony Michael Hall, Jenny Wright, Jeff Kober, Glynn Turman, Raymond J. Barry, Pepe Serna, Michele Little, Jerry Levine, Meat Loaf, Ji-Tu Cumbuka, Kevin McCorkle, Linda Shayne, Maggie Gwinn, Ted Gehring, Allan Graf, John Vickery, David Chung, John Tarnoff, Dan Lewk, Tony Acierto, Tony Kayden, Jennifer Balgobin	
J U L Y	25	The Patriot	Crown International Pictures	Frank Harris (director); Andy Ruben, Katt Shea Ruben (screenplay); Gregg Henry, Simone Griffeth, Michael J. Pollard, Jeff Conaway, Stack Pierce, Leslie Nielsen, Glenn Withrow, Diane Stevenett, Mike Gomez, Larry Mintz, Anthony Caldarella, Larry Moss, Smith Osbourne, Sally Brown	
J U L Y	25	Robotech: The Movie	Cannon Films / Harmony Gold USA / Tatsunoko Production / Anime International Company	Noboru Ishiguro, Carl Macek (directors); Ardwight Chamberlain (screenplay); Kerrigan Mahan, Iona Morris, Diane Michelle, Gregory Snegoff, Edie Mirman, Wendee Lee, Robert V. Barron, Michael McConnohie, Greg Finley, Frank Catalano, Bill Capizzi, Richard Epcar, Dave Mallow, Edward Mannix, Mike Reynolds, Tom Wyner, Wayne Anthony, Etienne Bannuett, Jaque Maecell, Ike Medlick, Spike Niblick, Bruce Winant	
J U L Y	27	Apology	HBO Pictures	Robert Bierman (director); Mark Medoff (screenplay); Lesley Ann Warren, Peter Weller, John Glover, Harvey Fierstein, Charles Dutton, Chris Noth, Helen Hanft, Jack Creley, George Loros, Jimmie Ray Weeks, Skye Bassett, Garrett M. Brown, Ellen Barber, Reathel Bean, Diana Reis	
J U L Y	30	The Assam Garden	Paramount Pictures / Moving Picture Company	Mary McMurray (director); Elisabeth Bond (screenplay); Deborah Kerr	
J U L Y	30	Nothing in Common	Tri-Star Pictures / Rastar	Garry Marshall (director); Rick Podell, Michael Preminger (screenplay); Tom Hanks, Jackie Gleason, Eva Marie Saint, Hector Elizondo, Barry Corbin, Bess Armstrong, Sela Ward, John Kapelos, Anthony Starke, Dan Castellaneta, Michael G. Hagerty, Toni Hudson, Bruce A. Young, Kathleen Marshall, Scott Marshall, Kim Genelle, Lynda Goodfriend, Andra Akers, Tracy Reiner, Sam Denoff, Johnny Yune, Lorna Thayer, Meg Wyllie, Jeris Lee Poindexter, Frank Campanella, Conrad Janis, Philip Baker Hall, Richard Kind, Cindy Harrell, Bill Applebaum, Mona Lyden, Julio Alonso, Jane Morris, Jeff Michalski, Ben Rawnsley, Mark von Holstein, Ron Dean, Steve Sheridan, Vincent Guastaferro, John Antony, Harvey Keenan	
A U G U S T	1	Choke Canyon	United Film Distribution	Charles Bail (director); Ovidio G. Assonitis, Alfonso Brescia, Sheila Goldberg (screenplay); Stephen Collins, Janet Julian, Bo Svenson, Lance Henriksen, Nicholas Pryor	
A U G U S T	1	Flight of the Navigator	Walt Disney Pictures / Producers Sales Organization	Randal Kleiser (director); Michael Burton, Matt MacManus (screenplay); Joey Cramer, Paul Reubens, Veronica Cartwright, Cliff DeYoung, Sarah Jessica Parker, Matt Adler, Howard Hesseman, Jonathan Sanger, Iris Acker, Richard Liberty, Raymond Forchion, Keri Rogers, Albie Whitaker	
A U G U S T	1	Friday the 13th Part VI: Jason Lives	Paramount Pictures	Tom McLoughlin (director/screenplay); Thom Mathews, Jennifer Cooke, David Kagen, Renée Jones, Kerry Noonan, Darcy DeMoss, Tom Fridley, Tony Goldwyn, C.J. Graham, Dan Bradley, Alan Blumenfeld, Ron Palillo, Michael Swan, Whitney Rydbeck, Roger Rose, Nancy McLoughlin, Matthew Faison, Ann Ryerson, Vincent Guastaferro, Courtney Vickery, Bob Larkin, Wallace Merck, Cynthia Kania, Michael Nomad, Justin Nowell, Tommy Nowell	
A U G U S T	1	Good to Go	Island Pictures	Blaine Novak (director/screenplay); Art Garfunkel, Robert DoQui, Harris Yulin, Richard Brooks, Richard Bauer, Hattie Winston, Fab Five Freddy, Anjelica Huston, Reginald Daughtry, Paula Davis, Michael White	
A U G U S T	1	Howard the Duck	Universal Pictures / Lucasfilm / Marvel Entertainment	Willard Huyck (director/screenplay); Gloria Katz (screenplay); Lea Thompson, Jeffrey Jones, Tim Robbins, Chip Zien, David Paymer, Paul Guilfoyle, Liz Sagal, Holly Robinson, Richard Edson, Dominique Davalos, Tommy Swerdlow, Miles Chapin, Paul Comi, Richard McGonagle, Virginia Capers, Miguel Sandoval, William Hall, John Fleck, Thomas Dolby, Wood Moy, Richard Kiley, Ed Gale, Jordan Prentice, Tim Rose, Peter Baird, Debbie Lee Carrington, Mel Blanc, Steve Sleap, Mary Wells, Lisa Sturz, Brian Steele	
A U G U S T	8	A Fine Mess	Columbia Pictures	Blake Edwards (director/screenplay); Ted Danson, Howie Mandel, Richard Mulligan, Stuart Margolin, María Conchita Alonso, Jennifer Edwards, Paul Sorvino, Rick Ducommun, Keye Luke, Dennis Franz, Larry Storch, Ed Herlihy, Walter Charles, Tawny Moyer, Emma Walton, Carrie Leigh, Sharan Lea	
A U G U S T	8	One Crazy Summer	Warner Bros. Pictures / A&M Films	Savage Steve Holland (director/screenplay); John Cusack, Demi Moore, Bobcat Goldthwait, Curtis Armstrong, Joel Murray, William Hickey, Joe Flaherty, Mark Metcalf, John Matuszak, Kimberly Foster, Matt Mulhern, Rich Little, Tom Villard, Jeremy Piven, Rich Hall, Taylor Negron, Billie Bird, Bruce Wagner	
A U G U S T	8	She's Gotta Have It	Island Pictures / 40 Acres and a Mule Filmworks	Spike Lee (director/screenplay); Tracy Camilla Johns, Redmond Hicks, John Canada Terrell, Spike Lee, Raye Dowell, Joie Lee, S. Epatha Merkerson, Bill Lee, Monty Ross, Erik Dellums, Reginald Hudlin, Ernest Dickerson, Fab Five Freddy, Dennis Karika, Tiziano Cortini, Eric Payne, Marcus Turner, Gerard Brown, Eric Wilkins, Scott Sillers, Geoffrey Garfield	
A U G U S T	8	The Transformers: The Movie	De Laurentiis Entertainment Group / Hasbro / Sunbow Productions / Toei Animation	Nelson Shin (director); Ron Friedman (screenplay); Peter Cullen, Judd Nelson, Robert Stack, Leonard Nimoy, Lionel Stander, Eric Idle, John Moschitta Jr., Frank Welker, Dan Gilvezan, Chris Latta, Casey Kasem, Scatman Crothers, Michael Bell, Corey Burton, Orson Welles, Neil Ross, Susan Blu, Buster Jones, Paul Eiding, Gregg Berger, Roger C. Carmel, Stanley Jones, Arthur Burghardt, Don Messick, Jack Angel, Ed Gilbert, Clive Revill, Hal Rayle, David Mendenhall, Norman Alden, Victor Caroli	
A U G U S T	15	Armed and Dangerous	Columbia Pictures	Mark L. Lester (director); Brian Grazer, James Keach, Harold Ramis, Peter Torokvei (screenplay); John Candy, Eugene Levy, Robert Loggia, Kenneth McMillan, Meg Ryan, Brion James, Jonathan Banks, Tom Lister Jr., James Tolkan, Don Stroud, Larry Hankin, Steve Railsback, Robert Burgos, Tony Burton, Larry "Flash" Jenkins, Stacy Keach, Sr., Teagan Clive, David Wohl, Glenn Withrow, Tito Puente, Saveliy Kramarov	
A U G U S T	15	The Boy Who Could Fly	20th Century Fox / Lorimar Film Entertainment	Nick Castle (director/screenplay); Jay Underwood, Lucy Deakins, Bonnie Bedelia, Fred Savage, Fred Gwynne, Colleen Dewhurst, Mindy Cohn, Janet MacLachlan, Jason Priestley, Cameron Bancroft, Louise Fletcher	
A U G U S T	15	The Fly	20th Century Fox	David Cronenberg (director/screenplay); Charles Edward Pogue (screenplay); Jeff Goldblum, Geena Davis, John Getz, Joy Boushel, Leslie Carlson, George Chuvalo, David Cronenberg	
A U G U S T	15	Manhunter	De Laurentiis Entertainment Group	Michael Mann (director/screenplay); William Petersen, Kim Greist, Joan Allen, Brian Cox, Dennis Farina, Stephen Lang, Tom Noonan, Benjamin Hendrickson, Michael Talbott, Dan Butler, Paul Perri, Patricia Charbonneau, Alex Neil, Norman Snow, Frankie Faison, Garcelle Beauvais, Chris Elliott, L.A. Winters, Kin Shriner, John Posey, Bill Smitrovich, Peter Maloney, Michael D. Roberts, Marshall Bell, Annie McEnroe	
A U G U S T	22	Extremities	Paramount Pictures / Atlantic Releasing Corporation	Robert M. Young (director); William Mastrosimone (screenplay); Farrah Fawcett, James Russo, Diana Scarwid, Alfre Woodard, Sandy Martin, Tom Everett, Enid Kent, Clare Wren, James Avery, Eddie Velez, Donna Lynn Leavy, Michael Hennessy, Danika Hendrickson	
A U G U S T	22	Night of the Creeps	Tri-Star Pictures	Fred Dekker (director/screenplay); Jason Lively, Steve Marshall, Jill Whitlow, Tom Atkins, Allan Kayser, Wally Taylor, Bruce Solomon, David Paymer, David Oliver, Dick Miller, Suzanne Snyder, John J. York, Jay Arlen Jones, Elizabeth Alda, Lori Lively, Dan Frischman, Shane Black, Robert Kurtzman, Howard Berger, Robert Kerman, Ken Heron, Alice Cadogan, June Harris, Robert Kino, Vic Polizos, Evelyne Smith, Dave Alan Johnson	
A U G U S T	22	Stand by Me	Columbia Pictures	Rob Reiner (director); Bruce A. Evans, Raynold Gideon (screenplay); Wil Wheaton, River Phoenix, Corey Feldman, Jerry O'Connell, Kiefer Sutherland, Casey Siemaszko, John Cusack, Marshall Bell, Frances Lee McCain, Gary Riley, Bradley Gregg, Bruce Kirby, William Bronder, Scott Beach, Richard Dreyfuss, Jason Oliver, Andy Lindberg, Madeleine Swift, Kent Luttrell	
A U G U S T	22	The Texas Chainsaw Massacre 2	Cannon Films	Tobe Hooper (director); L.M. Kit Carson (screenplay); Dennis Hopper, Caroline Williams, Jim Siedow, Bill Johnson, Bill Moseley, Lou Perryman, Judy Kelly, Chris Douridas, Ken Evert, Kinky Friedman, Dan Jenkins, Joe Bob Briggs	
A U G U S T	29	Shanghai Surprise	Metro-Goldwyn-Mayer / HandMade Films	Jim Goddard (director); John Kohn, Robert Bentley (screenplay); Sean Penn, Madonna, Paul Freeman, Richard Griffiths, Philip Sayer, Clyde Kusatsu, George Harrison, Victor Wong, Lim Kay Tong	
S E P T E M B E R	10	'night, Mother	Universal Pictures / Aaron Spelling Productions	Tom Moore (director); Marsha Norman (screenplay); Sissy Spacek, Anne Bancroft, Ed Berke, Carol Robbins, Jennifer Roosendahl, Michael Kenworthy, Sari Walker, Claire Malis	
S E P T E M B E R	12	Restless Natives	Orion Classics	Michael Hoffman (director); Ninian Dunnett (screenpaly); Vincent Friell, Joe Mullaney, Ned Beatty, Robert Urquhart, Bernard Hill, Rachel Boyd, Iain McColl, Mel Smith, Bryan Forbes, Nanette Newman, Dave Anderson, Ed Bishop, Teri Lally, Anne Scott-Jones	
S E P T E M B E R	13	Avenging Force	Cannon Films / Golan-Globus	Sam Firstenberg (director); James Booth (screenplay); Michael Dudikoff, Steve James, John P. Ryan, William Wallace, Marc Alaimo, James Booth, Karl Johnson, Allison Gereighty	
S E P T E M B E R	19	Blue Velvet	De Laurentiis Entertainment Group	David Lynch (director/screenplay); Kyle MacLachlan, Isabella Rossellini, Dennis Hopper, Laura Dern, Hope Lange, Dean Stockwell, George Dickerson, Priscilla Pointer, Frances Bay, Brad Dourif, Jack Nance, Fred Pickler, Angelo Badalamenti, Jack Harvey, Ken Stovitz, J. Michael Hunter, Dick Green, Jon Jon Snipes	
S E P T E M B E R	19	The Men's Club	Atlantic Releasing Corporation	Peter Medak (director); Leonard Michaels (screenplay); Roy Scheider, Harvey Keitel, Frank Langella, Treat Williams, David Dukes, Richard Jordan, Craig Wasson, Stockard Channing, Jennifer Jason Leigh, Ann Wedgeworth, Gina Gallego, Cindy Pickett, Gwen Welles, Penny Baker, Claudia Cron, Ann Dusenberry, Rebeccah Bush, Marilyn Jones, Manette La Chance	
S E P T E M B E R	19	Where the River Runs Black	MGM Entertainment Co.	Christopher Cain (director); Neal Jimenez, Peter Silverman (screenplay); Charles Durning, Peter Horton, Dana Delany, Ajay Naidu, Cástulo Guerra, Conchata Ferrell, Chico Díaz, Paulo Sergio Oliveira, Alessandro Rabelo, Marcelo Rabelo, Ariel Coelho, Divana Brandão	
S E P T E M B E R	20	Down by Law	Island Pictures / PolyGram Filmed Entertainment	Jim Jarmusch (director/screenplay); Tom Waits, John Lurie, Roberto Benigni, Nicoletta Braschi, Ellen Barkin, Billie Neal, Rockets Redglare, Vernel Bagneris, Joy N. Houck, Jr., Timothea, L.C. Drane, Carrie Lindsoe, Ralph Joseph, Richard Boes, Dave Petitjean	
S E P T E M B E R	24	The Name of the Rose	20th Century Fox / ZDF / France 3	Jean-Jacques Annaud (director); Andrew Birkin, Gérard Brach, Howard Franklin, Alain Godard (screenplay); Sean Connery, F. Murray Abraham, Feodor Chaliapin Jr., William Hickey, Michael Lonsdale, Ron Perlman, Christian Slater, Valentina Vargas, Helmut Qualtinger, Elya Baskin, Volker Prechtel, Michael Habeck, Urs Althaus, Leopoldo Trieste, Franco Valobra, Vernon Dobtcheff, Donald O'Brien, Andrew Birkin, Lucien Bodard, Peter Berling, Pete Lancaster, Dwight Weist	
S E P T E M B E R	26	Crocodile Dundee	Paramount Pictures	Peter Faiman (director); Paul Hogan, Ken Shadie, John Cornell (screenplay); Paul Hogan, Linda Kozlowski, Mark Blum, David Gulpilil, Michael Lombard, John Meillon, Reginald VelJohnson, Terry Gill, Steve Rackman, Gerry Skilton, Caitlin Clarke, John Snyder, Anne Carlisle, Anne Francine, Paul Greco, David Bracks, Peter Turnbull, Rik Colitti, Christine Totos, Graham 'Grace' Walker, Nancy Mette, Paige Matthews	
S E P T E M B E R	26	Half Moon Street	20th Century Fox / RKO Pictures	Bob Swaim (director/screenplay); Edward Behr, Paul Theroux (screenplay); Sigourney Weaver, Michael Caine, Patrick Kavanagh, Keith Buckley, Nadim Sawalha, Vincent Lindon, Michael Elwyn, Ram John Holder, Niall O'Brien, Donald Pickering, Maria Aitken, Angus MacInnes, Togo Igawa, Rupert Vansittart, Anne Lambton, Philip Whitchurch, Robert Lee, Janet McTeer, Carol Cleveland, Siobhan Redmond, Faith Kent, Ann Hanson, Patrick Newman, Muriel Villiers, Ninka Scott, Jasper Jacob, Joseph Karimbeik, Anita Edwards, John Sinclair, Eiji Kusuhara, Katherine Schofield	

== October–December ==
Opening		Title	Production company	Cast and crew	Ref.
O C T O B E R	3	Children of a Lesser God	Paramount Pictures	Randa Haines (director); Mark Medoff, Hesper Anderson (screenplay); Marlee Matlin, William Hurt, Piper Laurie, Philip Bosco, Linda Bove, Allison Gompf, Bob Hiltermann	
O C T O B E R	3	Round Midnight	Warner Bros. Pictures / Little Bear / PECF	Bertrand Tavernier (director/screenplay); David Rayfiel, Colo Tavernier (screenplay); Dexter Gordon, François Cluzet, Sandra Reaves-Phillips, Lonette McKee, Christine Pascal, Herbie Hancock, John Berry, Martin Scorsese, Bobby Hutcherson, Liliane Rovère, Pierre Trabaud, Benoît Régent, Arthur French, Philippe Noiret, Alain Sarde, Eddy Mitchell, Billy Higgins, John McLaughlin, Pierre Michelot, Wayne Shorter, Ron Carter, Palle Mikkelborg, Mads Vinding, Cheikh Fall, Tony Williams, Freddie Hubbard, Cedar Walton, Gabrielle Haker, Frédérique Meininger, Hart Leroy Bibbs, Ged Marlon, Victoria Gabrielle Platt, Éric Le Lann, Michel Pérez	
O C T O B E R	3	Tough Guys	Touchstone Pictures / Silver Screen Partners / The Bryna Company	Jeff Kanew (director); James Orr, James Cruikshank (screenplay); Burt Lancaster, Kirk Douglas, Charles Durning, Alexis Smith, Dana Carvey, Darlanne Fluegel, Eli Wallach, Billy Barty, Darlene Conley, Nathan Davis, Grant Aleksander, Monty Ash, Simmy Bow, Graham Jarvis, Ernie Sabella, Hilary Shepard, Jake Steinfeld, John Mariano, Jimmy Lennon, Michele Marsh, Todd Hallowell, Ellen Albertini Dow, Red Hot Chili Peppers	
O C T O B E R	8	The Color of Money	Touchstone Pictures / Silver Screen Partners	Martin Scorsese (director); Richard Price (screenplay); Paul Newman, Tom Cruise, Mary Elizabeth Mastrantonio, Helen Shaver, John Turturro, Bill Cobbs, Forest Whitaker, Keith McCready, Elizabeth Bracco, Ron Dean, Iggy Pop, Charles Scorsese, Bruce A. Young	
O C T O B E R	10	Deadly Friend	Warner Bros. Pictures	Wes Craven (director); Bruce Joel Rubin (screenplay); Matthew Labyorteaux, Kristy Swanson, Michael Sharrett, Anne Twomey, Richard Marcus, Anne Ramsey, Lee Paul, Russ Marin, Charles Fleischer	
O C T O B E R	10	Jumpin' Jack Flash	20th Century Fox / Silver Pictures	Penny Marshall (director); David Franzoni, Charles Shyer, Nancy Meyers, Chris Thompson (screenplay); Whoopi Goldberg, Jonathan Pryce, Stephen Collins, John Wood, Jeroen Krabbé, Jim Belushi, Sara Botsford, Peter Michael Goetz, Roscoe Lee Browne, Vyto Ruginis, Carol Kane, Annie Potts, Teagan Clive, Jon Lovitz, Phil Hartman, Michael McKean, Tracey Ullman, Tracy Reiner	
O C T O B E R	10	Peggy Sue Got Married	Tri-Star Pictures / American Zoetrope / Rastar	Francis Ford Coppola (director); Jerry Leichtling, Arlene Sarner (screenplay); Kathleen Turner, Nicolas Cage, Barry Miller, Catherine Hicks, Joan Allen, Kevin J. O'Connor, Jim Carrey, Lisa Jane Persky, Lucinda Jenney, Wil Shriner, Barbara Harris, Don Murray, Sofia Coppola, Maureen O'Sullivan, Leon Ames, Helen Hunt, Don Stark, Marshall Crenshaw, Glenn Withrow, Harry Basil, John Carradine, Sachi Parker	
O C T O B E R	10	That's Life!	Columbia Pictures	Blake Edwards (director/screenplay); Milton Wexler (screenplay); Jack Lemmon, Julie Andrews, Sally Kellerman, Robert Loggia, Jennifer Edwards, Rob Knepper, Matt Lattanzi, Chris Lemmon, Cynthia Sikes, Dana Sparks, Emma Walton, Felicia Farr, Theodore Wilson	
O C T O B E R	10	True Stories	Warner Bros. Pictures	David Byrne (director/screenplay); Stephen Tobolowsky, Beth Henley (screenplay); John Goodman, Annie McEnroe, Swoosie Kurtz, Spalding Gray, Pops Staples, Tito Larriva, David Byrne, John Ingle, Jo Harvey Allen	
O C T O B E R	17	Ratboy	Warner Bros. Pictures / Malpaso Productions	Sondra Locke (director); Rob Thompson (screenplay); Sondra Locke, Sharon Baird, Gerrit Graham, Robert Townsend, Larry Hankin, Christopher Hewett, Sydney Lassick, Louie Anderson, Billie Bird, John Witherspoon, Lee de Broux, Tiger Haynes, Gary Riley, Gordon Anderson, Nina Blackwood, Damita Jo Freeman, Courtney Gains, Winifred Freedman, Diane Delano, Brett Halsey, Durk Pearson, Sandy Shaw, Ed Williams, M.C. Gainey, Casey Sander, Bob Yerkes, Jon Lovitz, Bill Maher, Jonathan Schmock, James Vallely, Kathleen Wilhoite, Karen Lorre, Tim Thomerson	
O C T O B E R	24	Soul Man	New World Pictures	Steve Miner (director); Carol Black (screenplay); C. Thomas Howell, Rae Dawn Chong, Arye Gross, James B. Sikking, Leslie Nielsen, James Earl Jones, Julia Louis-Dreyfus, Maree Cheatham, Wallace Langham, Melora Hardin, Max Wright, Jeff Altman, Ron Reagan, Wolfe Perry, Amy Stoch, M.C. Gainey, Mark Neely, Dave Reynolds	
O C T O B E R	24	Trick or Treat	De Laurentiis Entertainment Group	Charles Martin Smith (director); Joel Soisson, Michael S. Murphey (screenplay); Marc Price, Tony Fields, Lisa Orgolini, Doug Savant, Elaine Joyce, Glen Morgan, Gene Simmons, Ozzy Osbourne, Alice Nunn, Charles Martin Smith, Clare Nono	
O C T O B E R	26	Florida Straits	HBO Pictures / Orion Pictures	Mike Hodges (director); Roderick Taylor (screenplay); Raúl Julia, Fred Ward, Daniel Jenkins, Jaime Sánchez, Victor Argo, Ilka Tanya Payán, Antonio Fargas, Jesse Corti, Raúl Dávila, Ed Grady	
O C T O B E R	31	Link	The Cannon Group	Richard Franklin (director); Everett De Roche (screenplay); Elisabeth Shue, Terence Stamp, Steven Pinner, Kevin Lloyd, David O'Hara, Richard Garnett, Geoffrey Beevers, Caroline John, Linus Roache	
O C T O B E R	31	The Mission	Warner Bros. Pictures	Roland Joffé (director); Robert Bolt (screenplay); Robert De Niro, Jeremy Irons, Ray McAnally, Aidan Quinn, Cherie Lunghi, Ronald Pickup, Chuck Low, Liam Neeson, Daniel Berrigan, Álvaro Guerrero, Fred Melamed, Monirak Sisowath, Bercelio Moya, Sigifredo Ismare, Asuncion Ontiveros, Alejandrino Moya, Rolf Gray	
N O V E M B E R	7	52 Pick-Up	Cannon Films	John Frankenheimer (director); John Steppling, Elmore Leonard (screenplay); Roy Scheider, Ann-Margret, Vanity, John Glover, Clarence Williams III, Lonny Chapman, Kelly Preston, Robert Trebor, Doug McClure, Tom Byron, Herschel Savage, Ron Jeremy Hyatt, Amber Lynn, Sharon Mitchell	
N O V E M B E R	7	Modern Girls	Atlantic Releasing Corporation	Jerry Kramer (director); Laurie Craig, Anita Rosenberg (screenplay); Virginia Madsen, Cynthia Gibb, Daphne Zuniga, Clayton Rohner, Chris Nash, Stephen Shellen, Rick Overton, John Dye, Martin Ferrero, Troy Evans, Mark Holton, Stuart Charno, Cameron Thor, Ron Campbell, Josh Richman, Pamela Springsteen, Mike Muscat	
N O V E M B E R	7	Sid and Nancy	The Samuel Goldwyn Company / Palace Pictures / Zenith Productions	Alex Cox (director/screenplay); Abbe Wool (screenplay); Gary Oldman, Chloe Webb, David Hayman, Debby Bishop, Andrew Schofield, Xander Berkeley, Perry Benson, Courtney Love, Edward Tudor-Pole, Kathy Burke, Sara Sugarman, Sy Richardson, Anne Lambton, Mark Monero, Biff Yeager, Peter Lee-Wilson, Gloria LeRoy, Milton Selzer, Iggy Pop, Tony London, Graham Fletcher-Cook, Michele Winstanley, Andy Bradford, Barbara Coles	
N O V E M B E R	7	Something Wild	Orion Pictures	Jonathan Demme (director); E. Max Frye (screenplay); Melanie Griffith, Jeff Daniels, Ray Liotta, Robert Ridgely, Adelle Lutz, Margaret Colin, Jack Gilpin, Su Tissue, Charles Napier, John Sayles, Tracey Walter, Gary Goetzman, John Waters, Sister Carol, The Feelies, Buzz Kilman	
N O V E M B E R	7	Tai-Pan	De Laurentiis Entertainment Group	Daryl Duke (director); John Briley, James Clavell, Stanley Mann (screenplay); Bryan Brown, John Stanton, Joan Chen, Tim Guinee, Bill Leadbitter, Russell Wong, Katy Behean, Kyra Sedgwick, Janine Turner, Norman Rodway, John Bennett, Derrick Branche, Vic Armstrong, Rosemarie Dunham, Robert Easton, Nicholas Gecks, Pat Gorman, Michael C. Gwynne, Denise Kellogg, Patrick Ryecart, Rob Spendlove, Dickey Beer, Cheng Chuang, Chen Shu, Richard Foo, Carol Gillies, Billy Horrigan, Phil Chatterton, Frans Dames	
N O V E M B E R	8	Quiet Cool	New Line Cinema	Clay Borris (director/screenplay); Susan Vercellino (screenplay); James Remar, Adam Coleman Howard, Daphne Ashbrook, Jared Martin, Nick Cassavetes, Joey Sagal, Chris Mulkey, Clayton Landey, Fran Ryan, Ted White, Rob Moran, Brooks Gardner, Travis McKenna	
N O V E M B E R	12	Heat	New Century Vista	Dick Richards, Jerry Jameson (directors); William Goldman (screenplay); Burt Reynolds, Karen Young, Peter MacNicol, Neill Barry, Howard Hesseman, Diana Scarwid, Joseph Mascolo, Deborah Rush, Wendell Burton, Joe Klecko, Pete Koch	
N O V E M B E R	14	Every Time We Say Goodbye	Tri-Star Pictures	Moshé Mizrahi (director/screenplay); Rachel Fabien, Leah Appet (screenplay); Tom Hanks, Cristina Marsillach, Benedict Taylor, Anat Atzmon, Gila Almagor, Moni Moshonov, Avner Hiskyahu, Esther Parnass, Orna Porat, Nissim Azikri, Moshe Ivgy, Orit Weisman, David Menachem, Avi Keidar, Alon Aboutboul, Dafna Armoni	
N O V E M B E R	14	Hoosiers	Orion Pictures	David Anspaugh (director); Angelo Pizzo (screenplay); Gene Hackman, Barbara Hershey, Dennis Hopper, Sheb Wooley, Maris Valainis, Brad Long, Steve Hollar, Fern Persons, Chelcie Ross, David Neidorf, Brad Boyle, Wade Schenck, Kent Poole, Scott Summers	
N O V E M B E R	14	Streets of Gold	20th Century Fox	Joe Roth (director); Heywood Gould, Richard Price, Tom Cole, Dezsö Magyar (screenplay); Klaus Maria Brandauer, Adrian Pasdar, Wesley Snipes, Angela Molina, Elya Baskin, Rainbow Harvest, John Mahoney, Dan O'Shea	
N O V E M B E R	21	An American Tail	Universal Pictures / Sullivan Bluth Studios / Amblin Entertainment	Don Bluth (director); Judy Freudberg, Tony Geiss (screenplay); Phillip Glasser, Amy Green, Nehemiah Persoff, Erica Yohn, Dom DeLuise, Christopher Plummer, Pat Musick, Cathianne Blore, John Finnegan, Will Ryan, Hal Smith, Neil Ross, Madeline Kahn, Dan Kuenster	
N O V E M B E R	21	Defense of the Realm	Hemdale Film Corporation	David Drury (director); Martin Stellman (screenplay); Gabriel Byrne, Greta Scacchi, Denholm Elliott, Ian Bannen, Fulton Mackay, Bill Paterson, David Calder, Frederick Treves, Robbie Coltrane, Annabel Leventon, Graham Fletcher-Cook, Danny Webb, Prentis Hancock, Mark Tandy, Oliver Ford Davies, George Ellis Jonesas, James Fleet, Lyndon Brook, Philip Whitchurch, Laurance Rudic	
N O V E M B E R	21	Firewalker	Cannon Films	J. Lee Thompson (director); Robert Gosnell (screenplay); Chuck Norris, Louis Gossett Jr., Melody Anderson, Will Sampson, Sonny Landham, John Rhys-Davies, Ian Abercrombie, Zaide Silvia Gutiérrez, John Hazelwood, Richard Lee-Sung, Álvaro Carcaño, Dale Payne, José Escandón, Mário Arévalo, Miguel Ángel Fuentes	
N O V E M B E R	21	Song of the South (re-issue)	Walt Disney Pictures	Harve Foster, Wilfred Jackson (director); Morton Grant, Maurice Rapf, Dalton S. Reymond, Bill Peet, George Stallings, Ralph Wright (screenplay); James Baskett, Bobby Driscoll, Luana Patten, Ruth Warrick, Hattie McDaniel, Lucile Watson, Mary Field, Johnny Lee, Nick Stewart, Roy Glenn, Clarence Nash, Glenn Leedy, Erik Rolf, Olivier Urbain, Anita Brown, George Nokes, Gene Holland, Helen Crozier	
N O V E M B E R	21	The Wraith	New Century Vista	Mike Marvin (director/screenplay); Charlie Sheen, Nick Cassavetes, Sherilyn Fenn, Randy Quaid, Matthew Barry, Clint Howard, Griffin O'Neal, David Sherrill, Jamie Bozian, Chris Nash, Christopher Bradley, Jeffrey Sudzin, Peder Melhuse, Michael Hundrtford, Dick Alexander, Vickie Benson, Steven Eckholdt, Elizabeth Cox, Joan H. Reynolds	
N O V E M B E R	26	The Mosquito Coast	Warner Bros. Pictures	Peter Weir (director); Paul Schrader (screenplay); Harrison Ford, Helen Mirren, River Phoenix, Conrad Roberts, Andre Gregory, Martha Plimpton, Dick O'Neill, Jadrien Steele, Jason Alexander, William Newman, Aurora Clavel, Butterfly McQueen, Melanie Boland, Hilary Gordon, Rebecca Gordon, Alice Heffernan-Sneed	
N O V E M B E R	26	Nutcracker: The Motion Picture	Atlantic Releasing Corporation / Pacific Northwest Ballet / Hyperion Pictures / The Kushner-Locke Company	Carroll Ballard (director)	
N O V E M B E R	26	Solarbabies	Metro-Goldwyn-Mayer	Alan Johnson (director); Walon Green, Douglas Anthony Metrov (screenplay); Richard Jordan, Jami Gertz, Jason Patric, Lukas Haas, Charles Durning, James LeGros, Peter DeLuise, Adrian Pasdar, Sarah Douglas, Frank Converse, Terrence Mann, Alexei Sayle, Bruce Payne, Willoughby Gray, Kelly Bishop, Jimmy Star, Claude Brooks, Peter Kowanko	
N O V E M B E R	26	Star Trek IV: The Voyage Home	Paramount Pictures	Leonard Nimoy (director); Steve Meerson, Peter Krikes, Nicholas Meyer, Harve Bennett (screenplay); William Shatner, Leonard Nimoy, DeForest Kelley, James Doohan, Walter Koenig, Nichelle Nichols, George Takei, Jane Wyatt, Catherine Hicks, Mark Lenard, Robin Curtis, Robert Ellenstein, John Schuck, Brock Peters, Michael Berryman, Grace Lee Whitney, Jane Wiedlin, Vijay Amritraj, Majel Barrett, Nick Ramus, Kirk R. Thatcher, Jeff Lester, Joe Lando, Madge Sinclair	
N O V E M B E R	28	Eye of the Tiger	Village Roadshow Pictures	Richard C. Sarafian (director); Michael Thomas Montgomery (screenplay); Gary Busey, Yaphet Kotto, Seymour Cassel, Bert Remsen, Denise Galik, William Smith, Judith Barsi, Kimberlin Brown, Ted Markland	
N O V E M B E R	29	Sword of Gideon	HBO Pictures	Michael Anderson (director); Chris Bryant (screenplay); Steven Bauer, Michael York, Robert Joy, Laurent Malet, Peter Dvorsky, Rod Steiger, Lino Ventura, Colleen Dewhurst, Leslie Hope, John Hirsch, Cyrielle Clair, Linda Griffiths, Daniel Alfie, Hrant Alianak, Sonia Benezra	
D E C E M B E R	5	Heartbreak Ridge	Warner Bros. Pictures / Malpaso Productions	Clint Eastwood (director); James Carabastos, Joseph Stinson (screenplay); Clint Eastwood, Marsha Mason, Everett McGill, Moses Gunn, Eileen Heckart, Bo Svenson, Boyd Gaines, Mario Van Peebles, Vincent Irizarry, Ramón Franco, Tom Villard, Mike Gomez, Peter Koch, Richard Venture, Peter Jason, John Hostetter, Mark Mattingly, Arlen Dean Snyder, Rodney Hill	
D E C E M B E R	12	Crimes of the Heart	De Laurentiis Entertainment Group	Bruce Beresford (director); Beth Henley (screenplay); Diane Keaton, Jessica Lange, Sissy Spacek, Sam Shepard, Tess Harper, Hurd Hatfield, Beeson Carroll, David Carpenter	
D E C E M B E R	12	The Golden Child	Paramount Pictures / Industrial Light & Magic	Michael Ritchie (director); Dennis Feldman (screenplay); Eddie Murphy, Charlotte Lewis, Charles Dance, Victor Wong, Randall "Tex" Cobb, James Hong, Tiger Chung Lee, Pons Maar, Wally Taylor, Eric Douglas, Charles Levin, Marilyn Schreffler, Frank Welker, J.L. Reate, Shakti Chen, Tau Logo, Peter Kwong	
D E C E M B E R	12	Native Son	Cinecom Pictures	Jerrold Freedman (director); Richard Wesley (screenplay); Victor Love, Elizabeth McGovern, Matt Dillon, Geraldine Page, Oprah Winfrey, Akosua Busia, Carroll Baker, John McMartin, Art Evans, John Karlen, Willard E. Pugh, Ving Rhames	
D E C E M B E R	12	Three Amigos	Orion Pictures / HBO Films	John Landis (director); Steve Martin, Lorne Michaels, Randy Newman (screenplay); Steve Martin, Chevy Chase, Martin Short, Alfonso Arau, Tony Plana, Patrice Martinez, Joe Mantegna, Phil Hartman, Jon Lovitz, Tino Insana, Kai Wulff, Norbert Weisser, Brian Thompson, Randy Newman, Rebecca Underwood, Loyda Ramos, Phillip Gordon	
D E C E M B E R	19	King Kong Lives	De Laurentiis Entertainment Group	John Guillermin (director); Ronald Shusett, Steven Pressfield (screenplay); Brian Kerwin, Linda Hamilton, John Ashton, Peter Michael Goetz, Michael Forest, Leon Rippy, Herschel Sparber, Peter Elliott, George Yiasoumi, Benjamin Kechley, Frank Maraden, Jimmie Ray Weeks, Wallace Merck, Dean Whitworth, Robin Cahall, Matt Totty	
D E C E M B E R	19	Lady and the Tramp (re-issue)	Walt Disney Pictures	Clyde Geronimi, Wilfred Jackson, Hamilton Luske (director); Erdman Penner, Joe Rinaldi, Ralph Wright, Don DaGradi (screenplay); Barbara Luddy, Larry Roberts, Bill Thompson, Dallas McKennon, Bill Baucom, Verna Felton, Peggy Lee, George Givot, Lee Millar, Stan Freberg, Alan Reed, Thurl Ravenscroft, Bill Lee, Max Smith, Bob Hamlin, Bob Stevens	
D E C E M B E R	19	Little Shop of Horrors	The Geffen Film Company	Frank Oz (director); Howard Ashman (screenplay); Rick Moranis, Ellen Greene, Vincent Gardenia, Steve Martin, Jim Belushi, John Candy, Christopher Guest, Bill Murray, Tichina Arnold, Michelle Weeks, Tisha Campbell, Levi Stubbs, Miriam Margoyles, Stanley Jones, Mak Wilson, Danny John-Jules, Heather Henson, Vincent Wong, Kerry Shale, Anthony Asbury, Brian Henson, Mak Wilson, David Barclay, Marcus Clarke, Toby Philpott, Don Austen, William Todd-Jones, Michael Quinn, James Barton, Ronnie Le Drew, Danny Cunningham, Gary Palmer, Paul Swaby, Robert Tygner, Sue Dacre, Paul Springer, David Greenaway, Michael Bayliss, Michael Barclay, Chris Leith, Terry Lee, Ian Tregonning, John Alexander, James Barton, Graham Fletcher	
D E C E M B E R	19	No Mercy	Tri-Star Pictures	Richard Pearce (director); Jim Carabatsos (screenplay); Richard Gere, Kim Basinger, Jeroen Krabbé, George Dzundza, Gary Basaraba, William Atherton, Terry Kinney, Ely Pouget, Bruce McGill, Ray Sharkey, Marita Geraghty, Aleta Mitchell, Fred Gratton, Dionisio, Kim Chan, George Dickerson	
D E C E M B E R	19	Platoon	Orion Pictures / Hemdale Film Corporation	Oliver Stone (director/screenplay); Charlie Sheen, Tom Berenger, Willem Dafoe, John C. McGinley, Kevin Dillon, Keith David, Mark Moses, Francesco Quinn, Forest Whitaker, Tony Todd, Richard Edson, Johnny Depp, Corey Glover, Chris Pedersen, Dale Dye, Oliver Stone, Reggie Johnson, Corkey Ford, David Neidorf, Paul Sanchez, Bob Orwig	
D E C E M B E R	25	Brighton Beach Memoirs	Universal Pictures / Rastar	Gene Saks (director); Neil Simon (screenplay); Blythe Danner, Bob Dishy, Judith Ivey, Jonathan Silverman, Stacey Glick, Lisa Waltz, Brian Drillinger	
D E C E M B E R	25	The Morning After	20th Century Fox / Lorimar Film Entertainment	Sidney Lumet (director); James Hicks, David Rayfiel (screenplay); Jane Fonda, Jeff Bridges, Raul Julia, Diane Salinger, Richard Foronjy, Bruce Vilanch, Geoffrey Scott, Kathleen Wilhoite, Corey Everson, Kathy Bates, Frances Bergen, James Haake, Don Hood	
D E C E M B E R	31	My Letter to George	RKO Pictures	Michael Laughlin (director/screenplay); Jodie Foster, John Lithgow, Michael Murphy, Dan Shor, Harry Andrews, Philip Holder, Beryl Te Wiata, Reg Evans, Jonathan Hardy, Don Selwyn, Derek Hardwick, Jonathan Elsom, George Spoors, Bob Gould, Norman Fairley	
D E C E M B E R	31	Wisdom	20th Century Fox / Cannon Films	Emilio Estevez (director/screenplay); Emilio Estevez, Demi Moore, Tom Skerritt, Veronica Cartwright, William Allen Young, Ernie Lively, Charlie Sheen, Richard Minchenberg, Brenda Medcalf	
D E C E M B E R	31	Witchboard	Cinema Group	Kevin Tenney (director/screenplay); Todd Allen, Tawny Kitaen, Stephen Nichols, Kathleen Wilhoite, Burke Byrnes, James W. Quinn, Rose Marie	

== See also ==
- List of 1986 box office number-one films in the United States
- 1986 in the United States
