= Tammie Souza =

American meteorologist

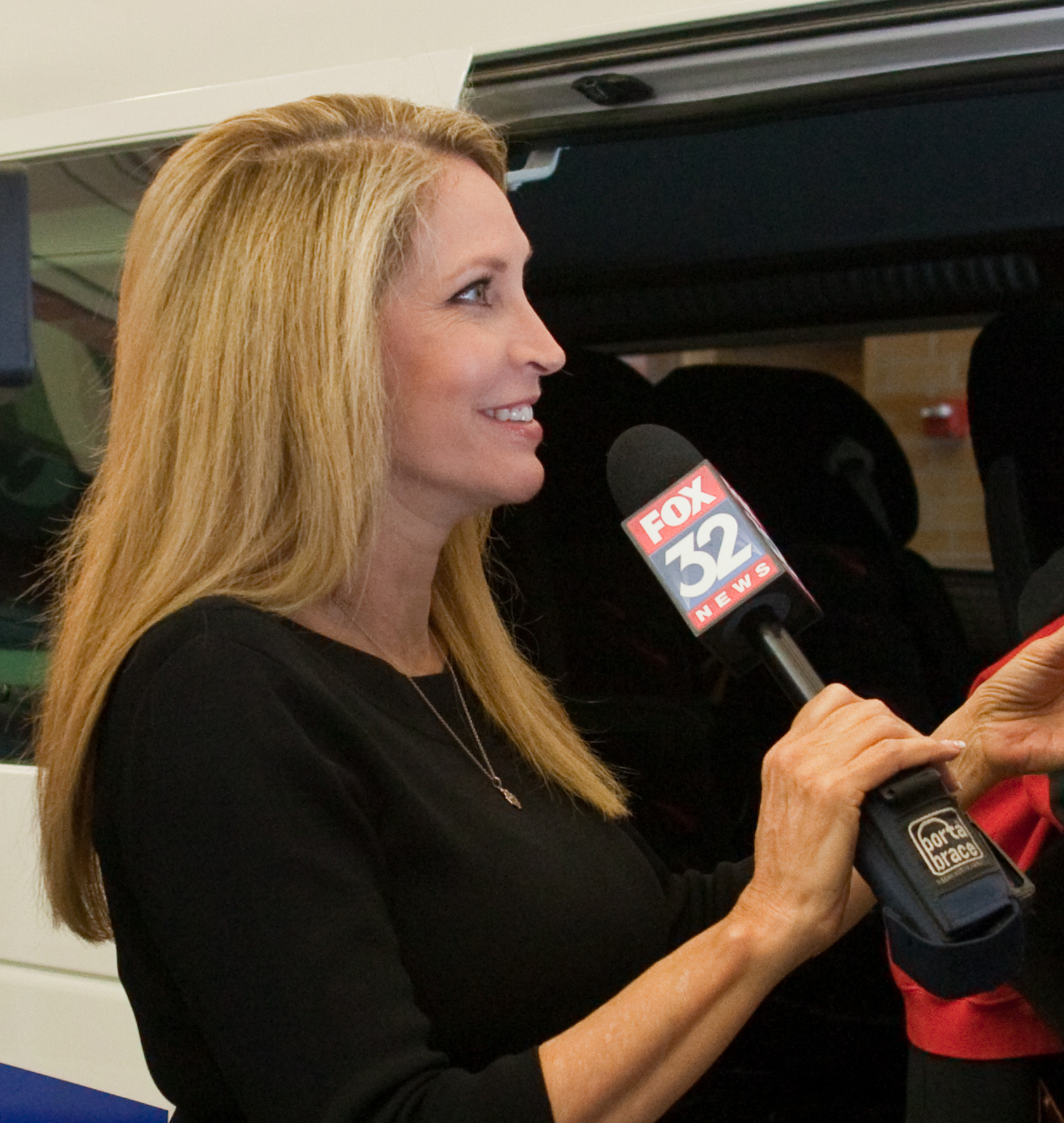
- Souza in 2015
- Born: Tammara J. Souza; January 29; Pittsburgh, Pennsylvania, United States
- Education: San Diego State University, Mississippi State University
- Occupation: Television meteorologist
- Years active: 1996–present
- Notable credit: Meteorologist for CBS and KYW-TV

Tammara J. "Tammie" Souza (born January 29) is an Emmy-winning meteorologist, She worked as the chief meteorologist at NBC O&O station WCAU-TV in Philadelphia, Pennsylvania, from March 2017 until December 2019. and is currently the weekend morning meteorologist at CBS O&O station KYW.

== Personal life ==
Born on January 29, in Pittsburgh, Pennsylvania, Souza was raised in San Diego, California. She received a Bachelor of Science in biology from San Diego State University, and has received a certification from Mississippi State University's broadcast meteorology program. She earned a pilot's license while in college.

Souza, her husband and their son moved from the Chicago area to Lower Merion Township, Pennsylvania, in 2017.

== Broadcast career ==
Souza began her career as the morning and noon meteorologist at KHSL in Chico, California. She then became chief meteorologist at WDJT in Milwaukee, Wisconsin. Souza later moved to Chicago, where she worked six years at WMAQ, and two years at WTSP in Tampa, Florida. While at WMAQ, she recruited viewers to provide temperature and rainfall as "weather watchers", and visited grade schools where she made weather presentations.

After the death of Dick Fletcher, WTSP's longtime chief meteorologist, Souza became the station's chief meteorologist.

Souza's sister, Patty, was a meteorologist for WTSP's sister station KXTV. At one point, Tammie and Patty Souza were the only siblings in the United States who delivered weather on television.

Souza holds both the AMS/CBM Seal and the NWA Seal and sits on the boards of both the American Meteorological Society and the National Weather Association.

In March 2017, she joined Comcast-NBC-owned WCAU (NBC 10) in Philadelphia, Pennsylvania as the station's chief meteorologist. Her last day at WCAU was December 6, 2019 after her contract with the station was not renewed.

In January 2020, she began what was expected to be a brief stint filling in for vacationing regulars at CBS O&O station CBS3.

In August 2020, she began a brief stint filling in at KYW's sister O&O station WBBM-TV CBS2 in Chicago while continuing to fill in at CBS3.

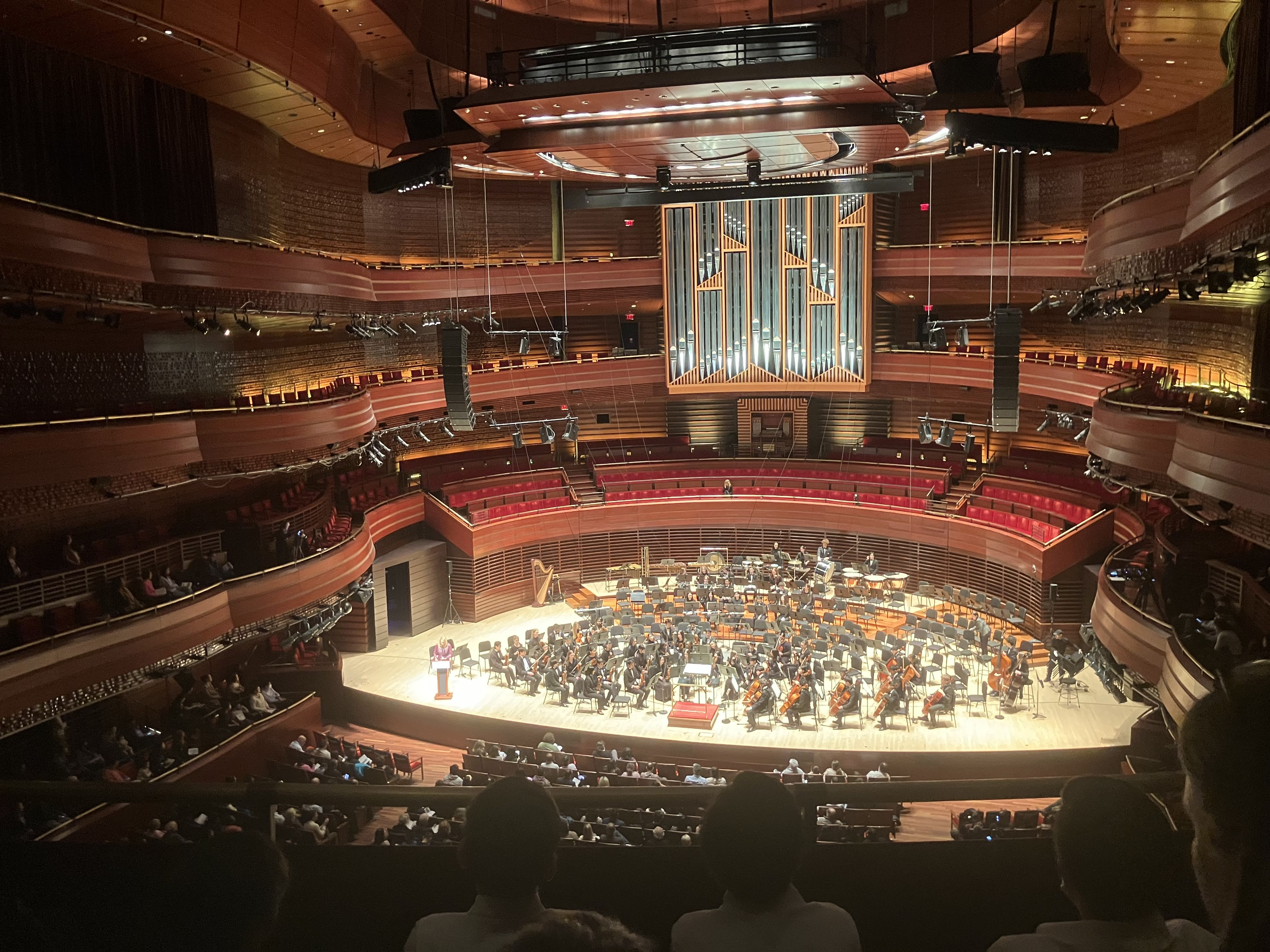
Souza was the guest host of the 11th annual PYO Showcase at the Kimmel Center for the Performing Arts on March 15, 2026.

In February 2022, Souza was made the permanent weekend morning meteorologist at CBS3 after Matt Peterson left the station five months earlier. Souza appears Saturday and Sunday mornings.

=== Awards and nominations ===
Souza has received 17 Emmy nominations and six Emmy Awards, including Best Weathercast, Best Weather and Science Report and for Special Live Reporting, as well as a first place award from the Associated Press for a report on shipwreck diving in Lake Michigan. The National Association of Black Journalists recognized her with a nomination for her story about fugitive slave ships on Lake Michigan.

== Acting career ==
Prior to her career in broadcast meteorology, Souza had several small acting roles.

=== Filmography ===
Year	Title	Role	Notes
1988	Assault of the Killer Bimbos	Darlene (truckstop waitress)	
1992	Hellroller	Bunny	
1993	Double Deception	Millie	

=== Television ===
Year	Title	Role	Notes
1988	Freddy's Nightmares	Mary Ann	Episode: No More Mr. Nice Guy
1994	Ellen	Good-Looking Woman	Episode: The Class Reunion
