= Assault of the Killer Bimbos =

- VHS cover art
- Directed by: Anita Rosenberg
- Screenplay by: Ted Nicolaou
- Story by: Ted Nicolaou; Patti Astor; Anita Rosenberg
- Produced by: David DeCoteau; John Schouweiler; Thomas A. Keith
- Starring: Elizabeth Kaitan; Christina Whitaker; Tammara Souza; Nick Cassavetes
- Cinematography: Thomas L. Callaway
- Edited by: Barry Zetlin
- Music by: Marc Ellis; Fred Lapides
- Production companies: Beyond Infinity; Empire Pictures; Generic Pictures; Titan Productions
- Distributed by: Urban Classics; Empire Pictures
- Release date: May 6, 1988 (US)
- Running time: 85 minutes
- Country: United States
- Language: English
- Budget: $250,000.00

Assault of the Killer Bimbos is a 1988 American comedy film starring Elizabeth Kaitan, Christina Whitaker and Tammara Souza.

== Premise ==
Two go-go dancers, Lulu and Peaches, are framed for the murder of their employer by the real killer, sleazy gangster Vinnie. Picking up waitress Darlene along the way, the three are involved in wild car chases with cops as they head south to cross the Mexico–United States border, where they unexpectedly encounter Vinnie in a fleabag Mexican motel.

== Cast ==
- Elizabeth Kaitan as Lulu
- Christina Whitaker as Peaches
- Tammara Souza as Darlene
- Nick Cassavetes as Wayne "Wayne-O"
- Griffin O'Neal as Troy
- Mike Muscat as Vinnie
- Patti Astor as "Poodles"
- Eddie Deezen as Dopey Deputy
- Clayton Landey as Hernandez
- Paul Ben-Victor as Customer
- Arell Blanton as Sheriff
- Jamie Bozian as Billy
- David Marsh as Joe "Shifty Joe"
- Jeffrey Orman as Deputy
- John T. Quern as The Bartender
- Keith Giaimo as "Rip"
- John Robert Dixon as Tucker

== Reception ==
Roger Ebert of Chicago Sun-Times offered a mixed review of the film, not praising it while neither condemning it. He offered that the title accurately described the film and wrote that it was "one of those movies where the lights are on but nobody's at home. It is the most simpleminded movie in many a moon, a vacant and brainless exercise in dreck, and I almost enjoyed myself sometimes, sort of. The movie is so cheerfully dim-witted and the characters are so enthusiastically sleazoid that the film takes on a kind of awful charm." Don Kaye of Rovi wrote that the film was "a dumb-but-hip instant cult favorite that knows - and revels in - its limitations."

Assault of the Killer Bimbos holds a 29% rating on Rotten Tomatoes based on seven reviews.

== Production ==
Casting of the film was ongoing in May 1987 with Generic Films to begin shooting on June 5 as part of a four-picture contract with Empire Pictures. Empire was ultimately displeased with the film delivered by Generic Films and the title was reassigned to a new film from director Anita Rosenberg that filmed in October 1987.

=== Soundtrack ===
1. "I've Been Watching You" – written by Kent Knight, Warren Dixon, Steven T. Easter and performed by Knight Time
2. "Headed For Heartbreak"
3. "Tennessee and Texas"
4. "Mister Right"
5. "Shopping For Boys"
6. "Do Me Right"
7. "All The Way"
8. "Bimbo Breakdown"
9. "Kiss And Tell"
10. "Yo-Yo"
11. "Hot Plastic"
12. "Bongos In Pastel"
13. "Doin' The Cha Cha Cha"
