= Patrick Tull =

British actor (1941–2006)

- Publicity photo of Patrick Tull (unknown date)
- Born: Patrick Jeremy Tull; 28 July 1941; Bexhill-on-Sea, Sussex, England
- Died: 23 September 2006 (aged 65); New York City, New York, United States
- Occupation: Actor

Patrick Tull (28 July 1941 – 23 September 2006) was a British stage, film and television actor.

== Early life and education ==
Tull was born in Bexhill-on-Sea, Sussex, England, the son of Phillida and Richard Tull. His father was an army officer and his mother an actress.

== Career ==
=== Film and television work ===
Although never a regular cast member, Tull performed in a number of episodes of well-known BBC television series in the 1960s, including Z-Cars, and its spin-off Softly, Softly, the soap opera Crossroads and the comedy Dad's Army. He also was heard but not seen in an episode of Doctor Who in The Krotons.

Tull acted in a few films including Mosquito Squadron (1969), Sex Farm (1973), and Parting Glances (1986), directed by Bill Sherwood.

=== Theatre work ===
On Broadway, he was a founding member of Tony Randall's National Actors' Theatre and appeared in Getting Married by George Bernard Shaw.

Tull's off-Broadway credits include What the Butler Saw and The Art of Success at the Manhattan Theatre Club, and the critically acclaimed plays Himself at the DR2 Theatre and Some Voices at the Greenwich Street Theatre.

He was a part of many productions in regional theatres throughout the U.S..

Tull received high praise for his work in the one-man play "The Hero of the Slocum", based on Eric Blau's account of the fire aboard the PS General Slocum in 1904, one of the greatest U.S. maritime disasters of the 20th century.

== Narrator and reader ==
Tull is the first of only two people – the other being Simon Vance – to have recorded the entire Aubrey-Maturin series of nautical historical novels by Patrick O'Brian in complete and unabridged form. O’Brian once expressed disapproval of a dramatic rendition of recorded novels ("To revert to my ideal reader: he would avoid obvious emotion, italics and exclamation marks like the plague – trying to put life into flat prose is as useful as flogging a dead horse"). Many of Tull's listeners disagree. His lively dramatization of the characters, especially Jack Aubrey and Stephen Maturin, and his comprehensive command of the dialects and tenor of the novels endeared him to many O’Brian fans.

Tull's narration of Ellis Peters' Brother Cadfael mysteries earned him a loyal following through 15 of her 21 books in the series.

He also narrated a number of television and documentary films including the seventeen-part series Sea Tales for the A&E television channel, some of which are available on DVD. He was also one of the most prolific narrators of recorded books in the U.S., featured on 104 productions.

In 2003, Tull performed in the world premiere of "Sydney the Sea Squid" for orchestra and narrator with music by Paul Stuart and text by Barbara Stewart with the Equinox Symphony Orchestra (with Stuart conducting) at the Rochester Institute of Technology, located in Rochester, New York.

In May 2005, Tull narrated the debut performance of jazz composer and trombonist Ron Westray's Chivalrous Misdemeanors (based on the novel Don Quixote by Miguel de Cervantes) with Wynton Marsalis and the Lincoln Center Jazz Orchestra.

== Personal life ==
He was a long-term resident of New York City where he died on the morning of 23 September 2006 following a lengthy illness.

== Filmography ==
Year	Title	Role	Notes
1969	Mosquito Squadron	Flight Lieutenant Templeton	Uncredited
1970	Toomorrow	Bearded Student	Uncredited
1973	Sex Farm	Francois, dietician	
1986	Parting Glances	Cecil	
1996	Sleepers	Jerry the Bartender	

== See also ==
- List of British actors
- List of people from New York City
- List of voice actors
