= Mike Muscat =

American actor (born 1952)

- Born: May 22, 1952 (age 74); Fort Bragg, North Carolina, U.S.
- Occupation: Actor
- Years active: 1973–present

Mike Muscat (born May 22, 1952) is an American actor. He has played an assortment of roles in various television shows, including Totally Outrageous Behavior and The Strange Case of Dr. Jekyll and Mr. Hyde.

== Career ==
One of Muscat's earliest roles was in the 1973 film, The Last American Hero which starred Jeff Bridges and Valerie Perrine. The following year he had a supporting role as Clarence in the 1974 film Hot Summer in Barefoot County. He was Howard Tindell in the William Malone directed horror / sci-fi film, Scared to Death. 1996 saw him in the Frank Harris directed The Patriot. It was a film about stolen atomic bombs which starred Gregg Henry, Leslie Nielsen and Stack Pierce. Muscat had a role as Uncle Ralph in the film Horrorween. He was also one of the writers for the film.

== Filmography (selective) ==
Title	Role	Director	Year	Notes
The Last American Hero	Party Guest	Lamont Johnson	1973	
Hot Summer in Barefoot County	Clarence	Will Zens	1974	
Scared to Death	Howard Tindall	William Malone	1981	
The Clan of the Cave Bear	Dorv	Michael Chapman	1986	
Kung Fu: The Movie	Robber	Richard Lang	1986	
The Patriot	Bar room bully	Frank Harris	1986	
Hunter's Blood	Bubba	Robert C. Hughes	1996	
Modern Girls	Mechanic	Jerry Kramer	1986	
Assault of the Killer Bimbos	Vinnie	Anita Rosenberg	1988	
Terminator 2: Judgment Day	Moshier	James Cameron	1991	Guard #2 at Cyberdyne Systems, also Edward Furlong's acting coach on the film
Last Action Hero	Cop	John McTiernan	1993	
The Strange Case of Dr. Jekyll and Mr. Hyde	Night Watchman	John Carl Buechler	2006	
