= Modern Girls =

1986 film by Jerry Kramer

- Theatrical release poster
- Directed by: Jerry Kramer
- Written by: Laurie Craig; Anita Rosenberg
- Produced by: Thomas Coleman; Gary Goetzman; June Petersen; Anita Rosenberg; Michael Rosenblatt
- Starring: Virginia Madsen; Cynthia Gibb; Daphne Zuniga; Clayton Rohner
- Cinematography: Karen Grossman
- Edited by: Mitchell Sinoway
- Music by: Eddie Arkin; Iva Davies; Jay Levy
- Production company: Atlantic Entertainment Group
- Distributed by: Atlantic Entertainment Group
- Release date: September 26, 1986
- Running time: 84 minutes
- Country: United States
- Language: English
- Box office: $604,849 (U.S.)

Modern Girls is a 1986 American comedy film directed by Jerry Kramer, starring Virginia Madsen, Daphne Zuniga, and Cynthia Gibb. Set during a single night in Los Angeles, it follows two young women who, while venturing through the city's nightclub scene, befriend their roommate's blind date.

== Plot ==
Three women in their early twenties, Margo, Kelly, and Cece, are roommates living in Los Angeles working menial jobs by day, and by night they enjoy the vibrant and decadent nightlife of the city. Margo has a boring job in telemarketing, Cece gets fired from her job at a department store, while Kelly works in a pet store and is very good at selling pets, mainly thanks to her looks.

It is Friday night and the women are getting ready for a night out on the town. However, Margo and Cece soon discover that Kelly has taken Margo's car to go meet a DJ she is infatuated with in downtown Los Angeles. Luckily, Kelly's blind date for the night, the bookish Clifford—one of her many infatuated customers—arrives to pick her up, so Margo and Cece hitch a ride with him to the club where the DJ is working. Cliffie (as Cece calls him) reluctantly tags along on a rollercoaster ride with them and learns how the women usually spend their nights out.

While at the club, popular rock star and MTV sensation Bruno X arrives, and Cece desperately manages to get his attention. A police raid on the club interrupts the two's encounter, forcing Cece and Margo to leave with Clifford. The three decide to stop at an after-hours goth bar for drinks. Cece uses a hotel matchbook Bruno had to surmise where he is staying, and convinces Clifford, who bears a striking resemblance to Bruno, to impersonate him, resulting in Clifford being forced into shooting a music video on the street.

Meanwhile, Kelly has drinks at Sharkey's bar, where another DJ named Milo offers her drugs. Cece, Margo, and Clifford go there to retrieve her and find her inebriated and surrounded by a group of lecherous men, but manage to save her from what appears to be an impending gang rape. When a rainstorm begins, Clifford stops to close the top of his convertible and accidentally blows out his tires on traffic spikes in a parking lot. The group embarks on foot along Hollywood Boulevard. A disenchanted Clifford is surprised to learn through conversation that Margo majored in comparative literature in college.

Clifford borrows a car from a driving school where he works as a driving instructor, and the group visits the exclusive Club VooDoo, which Clifford manages to infiltrate with the women after the bouncers assume him to be Bruno X. In the bathroom, a now sober Kelly tells Margo that she will tend to Clifford, to which Margo responds evasively. While Kelly dances with an inebriated Clifford, Cece learns from Marsalis, an acquaintance of Bruno X, that he is obsessed with her and has been searching for her since the club raid earlier that night. Marsalis tells Cece that Bruno has a 7:00 a.m. flight booked at the Santa Monica Airport.

A food fight breaks out in Club VooDoo when Clifford attempts to stop Kelly from leaving with Ray, one of her admirers. Kelly flees with Ray, leaving Cece, Margo, and Clifford on their own again. The three chase after Ray's Jeep and attack him when he becomes physically violent with Kelly. The four visit the police station after, where Kelly files a police report against him. After Clifford teases Margo, and the two kiss.

The group drives Cece to the airport as dawn approaches, and she is reunited with Bruno, who asks her to accompany him on tour. A flattered Cece tells him that she would miss her friends too much and instead offers him her phone number. As Bruno leaves, Clifford asks the three women what their plans are for the evening, and they playfully attack him.

== Cast ==
- Cynthia Gibb as Cece
- Virginia Madsen as Kelly
- Daphne Zuniga as Margo
- Clayton Rohner as Clifford / Bruno X
- Chris Nash as Ray
- Martin Ferrero as music video director
- Stephen Shellen as Brad
- Rick Overton as Marsats
- Troy Evans as club owner
- John Dye as Mark
- Mark Holton as Boss
- Stuart Charno as Nerdy Guy
- Cameron Thor as D.J. #1
- Ron Campbell as D.J. #2
- Josh Richman as Milo
- Pamela Springsteen as Tanya
- Mike Muscat as a mechanic

== Production ==
Principal photography of Modern Girls began in Los Angeles on April 1, 1986.

== Soundtrack ==
A soundtrack album to the film was released in 1986 with Depeche Mode's "But Not Tonight" as the first track. The song was released as a promo single in February 1986 and later as a 12″ single in the United States only, accompanied by a music video featuring footage from Modern Girls to help promote the movie. This video was included on the second DVD included in the 2002 UK version of Depeche Mode's The Videos 86–98. Several other songs used in the film did not appear on the soundtrack album.

== Release ==
Modern Girls was released regionally in the fall of 1986, with screenings beginning September 26, 1986, in Victoria, Texas, and October 17, 1986, in Newport News, Virginia. It opened in Boise, Idaho, and Portland, Oregon, on November 7, 1986.

The film opened theatrically in New York City and Los Angeles on December 5, 1986. The theatrical release ran 1 hour, 24 minutes and was rated PG-13 by the Motion Picture Association.

=== Box office ===
Modern Girls earned $604,849 at the U.S. box office during its theatrical run.

=== Home media ===
On April 2, 2012, Modern Girls was brought to DVD as part of the MGM Limited Edition Collection series. Kino Lorber released a Blu-ray edition in October 2015.

== Reception ==
On Rotten Tomatoes, the film holds a 40% rating based on 5 reviews.

=== Critical response ===
Rosemary Breslin of the New York Daily News panned the film, awarding it zero stars and describing it as a dull replication of After Hours (1985). Ted Mahar of The Oregonian compared the film favorably against Welcome to 18, praising the performances of Madsen, Zuniga, and Gibb specifically.

Roger Ebert was also dismissive of the film, awarding it a one out of four star-rating, and summarizing: "Here’s a movie without a brain in its head about three young women with no brains in theirs. All three of the actresses have shown in previous movies that they have lots of brains and style, so I guess Modern Girls wanted it that way. Too bad."

Janet Maslin of The New York Times gave the film a mixed review, writing that it "is structured less as a conventional movie than as a scene. The audience can drop in, hang out for a while and then drop out without feeling that anything of consequence has happened. This format undoubtedly works better on home video than in theatrical showings, if it works anywhere at all... Modern Girls isn't notable for anything but its crassness, which is exceptionally complete. It isn't worth seeing, but it might be worth putting in a time capsule, right beside Ferris Bueller's Day Off. Twenty years from now, no one will believe life was ever lived this way."

== See also ==
- List of American films of 1986
