= Jeff Andrus =

American novelist

- Born: Jeffery Hughes Andrus; March 19, 1947; King City, California, U.S.
- Died: March 27, 2011 (aged 64)
- Education: Stanford University
- Occupations: Screenwriter; novelist; essayist
- Writing career
- Language: English
- Genre: Mystery fiction
- Notable works: The Proverb (2004); Tracer Inc. (1994); The Jeweler's Shop adaptation (1989); As Summers Die (1986); Doc (1974)
- Website: www.jeffandrus.com

Jeffery Hughes "Jeff" Andrus (/ˈændrəs/; March 19, 1947 – March 27, 2011) was an American author, best known for having written The Proverb (2004), adapting Pope John Paul II's 1960 play The Jeweler's Shop, Doc (1971), As Summers Die, and the Tracer Family mystery fiction series. Additionally, Andrus wrote and made a cameo appearance in the 2004 Award-Winning short film The Proverb along with Scott Waara and Nancy Stafford.

Andrus was born in King City, California and graduated from Stanford University in 1970 with a degree in English. He married Gwyneth in about 1969. Andrus died on March 27, 2011, of congestive heart failure.
