= As Summers Die =

1986 American made-for-television film

- Genre: Drama
- Based on: As Summers Die by Winston Groom
- Written by: Jeff Andrus
- Directed by: Jean-Claude Tramont
- Starring: Jamie Lee Curtis; Bette Davis; Scott Glenn
- Music by: Michel Legrand
- Country of origin: United States
- Original language: English

Production
- Executive producers: Frank Konigsberg; Larry Sanitsky
- Producer: Robert Christiansen
- Production location: Valdosta, Georgia
- Cinematography: Ernest Day
- Editor: Michael Brown
- Running time: 91 minutes
- Production companies: HBO Premiere Films; Lorimar Telepictures

Original release
- Network: HBO
- Release: May 18, 1986

As Summers Die is a 1986 American made-for-television drama film starring Scott Glenn, Jamie Lee Curtis, Bette Davis and Beah Richards, directed by Jean-Claude Tramont. The film is loosely based on Winston Groom's 1980 novel of the same name about greed, bigotry and justice in late 1950s segregationist southern Louisiana. It was filmed in Valdosta and Quitman Georgia and premiered on HBO on May 18, 1986. The film was the last television film produced by HBO Premiere Films before being folded into HBO Pictures, with the next Premiere film, Apology, released under that banner. It was later released on VHS by HBO/Cannon Video.

== Plot ==
Lawyer Willie Croft (Scott Glenn) is indifferent, letting his practice run itself, when the town's richest family begins a determined effort to obtain the farm of an old black woman, Elvira Backus (Beah Richards) when it is discovered that the land might contain oil deposits. Elvira claims she was given her land by the dead family patriarch, Jonathan Holt, and finds an unlikely ally in Jonathan's aging sister, Hannah Loftin (Bette Davis), whose mental competence is being challenged by the Holt clan. As for Croft, his growing involvement in the case intensifies when he begins to fall in love with Hannah's high-spirited niece, Whitsey (Jamie Lee Curtis).

== Cast ==
- Scott Glenn as Willie Croft
- Jamie Lee Curtis as Whitsey Loftin
- Bette Davis as Hannah Loftin
- John Randolph as Augustus Tompkins
- Beah Richards as Elvira Backus
- Ron O'Neal as Daniel Backus
- Bruce McGill as V.D. Skinner
- Richard Venture as Brevard Holt
- John McIntire as Judge Dudley McCormack
- Penny Fuller as Marci Holt
- Paul Roebling as Percy Holt
- CCH Pounder as Priscilla
- Tammy Baldwin as Wanda
