= Gary Riley =

American actor

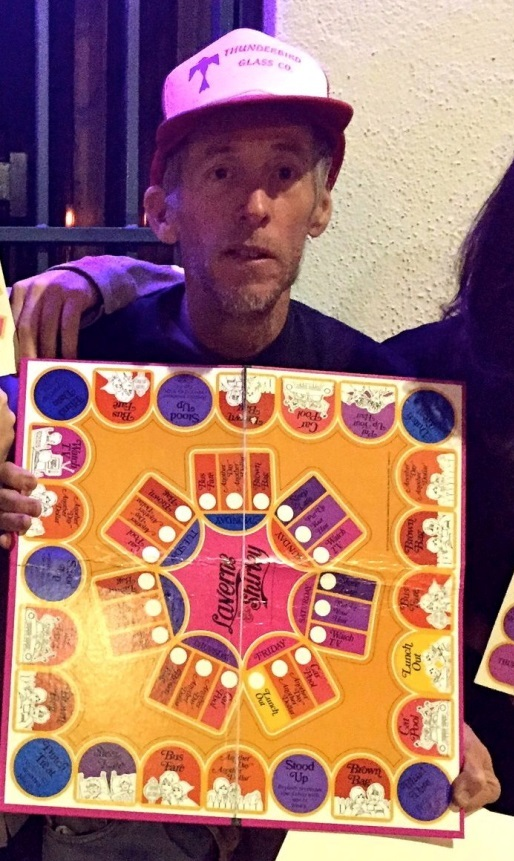
- Riley in 2015
- Born: April 28, 1967 (age 58); Los Angeles County, California, U.S.
- Occupation: Actor
- Years active: 1984–1996

Gary Riley (born April 28, 1967) is an American former child and teen character actor with numerous film and television credits.

== Early life and education ==
Riley grew up in Irvine, California, where he attended Newport Harbor High School and University High School. He did acting training at South Coast Repertory Young Conservatory Players.

== Film and television career ==
Riley played Charlie Hogan, one of his best-known roles, in the 1986 film Stand by Me, and also received notice for his portrayal of Dave Frazier in the 1987 comedy Summer School. He made notable appearances as a thief who steals money from Steve Martin's and John Candy's characters' wallets in Planes, Trains, and Automobiles, and as a naive metalhead customer whom Ken Kessler (portrayed by Judge Reinhold) cannot bear to rip off after discovering his girlfriend is pregnant in Ruthless People. He also made guest appearances on TV shows such as Knots Landing, Growing Pains, a special hour-long episode of Amazing Stories directed by Steven Spielberg, and Airwolf. His last role was as a thug in the film Fear, starring Mark Wahlberg.

In 1986 he auditioned for the roles of Bill S. Preston Esquire and Ted "Theodore" Logan in Bill & Ted's Excellent Adventure, being one of the final picks along with Keanu Reeves, Alex Winter, Matt Adler, and Donovan Leitch. In 2020, his audition tapes, which had never before been released publicly, were released by the Daily Mail.

== Personal life ==
As the 1980s came to a close, he spent much of his time following the Grateful Dead and later Phil Lesh and Friends.

Riley has been a frequent guest of the Adventure Club Podcast, with hosts Guy Hutchinson and John J. Galbo. He has called in from different bars and restaurants with various guests in the entertainment industry. He participated in the Summer School Q&A at New Beverly Cinema in the summer of 2013.

He has lived in Portland and Eugene, Oregon and currently resides in the Los Angeles area. Riley has said he lived off residual checks for almost twenty years after leaving Hollywood.
