= Parting Glances =

1986 film by Bill Sherwood

- Film poster
- Directed by: Bill Sherwood
- Written by: Bill Sherwood
- Produced by: Nancy Greenstein; Paul L. Kaplan; Yoram Mandel; Arthur Silverman
- Starring: Richard Ganoung; John Bolger; Steve Buscemi; Adam Nathan; Kathy Kinney; Patrick Tull
- Production company: Rondo Productions
- Distributed by: Cinecom Pictures
- Release date: February 19, 1986
- Running time: 90 minutes
- Country: United States
- Language: English

Parting Glances is a 1986 American drama film. The film was one of the first motion pictures to deal frankly and realistically with the subject of AIDS and the impact of the relatively new disease on the gay community in the Ronald Reagan era and at the height of the pandemic. It is considered by film critics an important film in the history of gay cinema. The story revolves around a gay couple facing the challenges of a long-distance relationship. The film was well-received for its detailed evocation of gay and gay-friendly urbanites in 1980s Manhattan.

The film's soundtrack includes the Bronski Beat songs "Love and Money," "Smalltown Boy" and "Why." First-time director Bill Sherwood died of complications due to AIDS in 1990.

== Plot ==
Robert and Michael, a gay male couple in their late 20s, live in New York City. The first several scenes, set to silence, show them walking around New York City and, later, an apartment that they share. It is revealed that Robert is leaving for two years on a work assignment in Africa while his partner, Michael (a literary editor), stays behind.

Michael goes to a music (vinyl) store and begins browsing LPs when he makes flirtatious eye contact with the young man behind the register, Peter. When Michael brings the LP he is purchasing up to the register, the two young men converse and Peter asks Michael what he is doing that night. Michael responds that he is going to a dinner party, then a going-away party-party, before giving Peter the phone number for the party host, Joan. Peter then introduces himself and the two share a flirtatious and sweet exchange. Michael leaves the store.

Michael returns home to Robert watering his plants. Michael asks Robert if he's really not going to see Nick (character not yet introduced) before he leaves on his trip and Robert declines. Michael then complains that Robert's boss and his wife have a lot of nerve to invite them to a dinner on Robert's last night in the U.S. The two playfully argue about bringing an umbrella – Robert wants to bring it, but Michael says it is not going to rain and complains he will have to carry it around all night.

In the next scene, we see Nick (Steve Buscemi) lying on a bed in his apartment when Michael enters. Nick's apartment is filled with various pieces of artwork, including a Keith Haring piece hung behind his bed. Nick is listening to headphones while watching MTV, complaining that his neighbors make very loud primal sex noises while he waits for "his video" to play on MTV. Michael then cooks food for Nick while Nick makes several humorously morbid comments and offering him his belongings, implying for the first time that he may have AIDS. It becomes clear that Nick is Michael's ex, and that Michael still loves him. Michael accidentally cuts himself with Nick's knife and goes to the bathroom to treat the wound. He then comes back out and asks Nick if he has used the knife recently, but Nick does not hear the question and Michael does not re-ask. The two arm wrestle and Michael lets Nick win the first time, then beats him the second time.

The next scene shows the couple (Michael and Robert) at the dinner party hosted by Robert's boss and his wife (Cecil and Betty). Betty asks if Michael will still visit after Robert has gone on his trip, to which Cecil responds "Heavens! They are not a couple divorcing," implying that he does not know the truth about Michael and Robert's relationship. Later, it is revealed that Betty and Michael have discussed the true nature of the relationship (and Betty is accepting, sharing that she had gay friends in college and throughout her young adulthood), and that Cecil knows as well. In a private conversation with Cecil, Robert and Cecil discuss Cecil's own relationships with men during his travels as a young man, many of whom he continues to hold affection for. It is never discussed between all four of them, though Michael knows about Cecil's relationships with men. Michael is angry at how Cecil deceives Betty and that Cecil is ultimately involved in an archaic "cover marriage." Robert then shares that Cecil didn't mandate the trip to Ghana, but that he ultimately decided to go himself because things have gotten "too predictable." Michael is hurt by this realization.

Nick is shown in his apartment, listening to an opera record. The specific scene is focused on one character in the opera being pressured to "repent" by others, but refusing to. Nick startles and we see his face on MTV, revealing "his" music video that he was waiting for earlier literally features him. Nick calls Michael and Robert at home to tell them to put on MTV, but they miss the call. They later call Joan in order to tell her they won't make it to the party. She rejects this and insists they come over, while lighting a joint.

We then see Nick begin to record his will in video format. Nick tells his father that he was not overly promiscuous and apologizes for not telling his dad before. He then dispositions his money, giving his dad $10,000, Michael $50,000, and Joan and Terry $20,000 each. He earmarks the rest to GMHC for care for "poor people with AIDS and not to medical research because if the feds can spend a trillion dollars on bombs, they can spend a little on research, right?" He then bequeaths a dildo to Robert and insults Robert to Michael, but takes it back before realizing he was never even recording.

They eventually go to Joan's house and walk into a surprise going-away party with lots of people, including Peter from the record store and a variety of the couple's queer friends. Michael introduces his friend Terry to Peter. Several people at the party inquire about Nick with Michael, making excuses as to why they have not called or visited. Peter asks Michael if Robert is his lover, to which Michael says yes. Peter says, "so what are you doing tomorrow night?" and Michael replies, "I haven't thought that far ahead yet." The two continue to have flirtatious exchanges throughout the evening.

Nick, in his apartment, has a brief and inexplicable moment of hallucination of a knight in armor, and he gets dressed quickly and leaves the apartment. Back at the party, Michael tells Joan that he has always loved Nick more than Robert and that he feels guilty about feeling grateful that he doesn't have AIDS. In the middle of the party, an impromptu burlesque-ish performance occurs, after which Nick walks into the party and is greeted warmly by Michael and friends Terry and Joan at the party. Robert spends a long time at the party talking to his ex-girlfriend, going so far as to ignore Michael when he gives him the signal that he wants to go home.

Peter introduces himself to Nick and says that his brother has "a couple of his albums." He tells Terry that his friend Michael is playing hard to get, to which Terry retorts, "that's because he's already got." Peter tells Terry and Nick that he keeps getting mixed signals from Michael, and implies that if Michael is worried about catching "you-know-what" (HIV) "it won't be from [him]" in front of Nick, who is HIV-positive (though Peter doesn't know it). Peter later finds Michael in the bathroom and shares his phone number, then apologizes to Nick for his earlier comments about "you-know-what." Nick and Peter share a long moment in the stairwell, with Nick reflecting on the "old days" and how and when he met Nick. The scene evokes feelings of experience, wisdom, nostalgia, and jadedness from Nick, while Peter is hopeful, vivacious, young, and naive.

Terry, Nick, and Robert leave Joan's party and go to a gay club to dance. When they enter the club, two gay men are signing. Robert calls Nick from the club. Nick is at home sleeping. Robert apologizes for not saying goodbye, and tells Nick to take care of himself. The phone call ends and Nick hallucinates the knight again. The knight begins whispering, "repent" at Nick from behind a glass door in his apartment. Nick refuses to repent, and the knight takes off his helmet, offering Nick a cigarette from behind the glass door. Nick recognizes the knight as "Greg Wandlemire" and asks him what he is doing here. The knight replies that heaven is "real boring" and to hang on as long as [he] can. The two share a humorous and enigmatic exchange, and then the knight disappears.

The morning after the party, Michael steals the house keys and runs away from Robert, and the two ultimately have a fight because Robert is leaving Michael in the U.S. despite alluding to the fact that the relationship could be viable if they persevered. Michael insinuates Robert is leaving because he doesn't want to be around to support Michael when Nick dies. Michael then states he is going to get even angrier after Nick dies, going after politicians, doctors, and bigots. Robert blames Nick's AIDS diagnosis on promiscuity and tells Michael to spend more time with Nick before he dies. The two share one last hug before Robert enters the airport.

At the airport, Robert runs into Cecil, who tells him that he will be traveling one leg of the trip with him before he goes to Sri Lanka for a six-month field assignment, which he had been planning for months, but told Betty about that morning. Michael takes the train home from the airport, and hallucinates Nick on the train. Michael goes to Nick's to make him food. Taking in the absurdity of the moment and the complexity of their lives, the two then smash plates together in Nick's kitchen. The two continue to talk about Nick's diagnosis, the elusive promise of a medication "eventually," and more broadly about their relationship and care for one another. Michael tells Nick he has only been in love once (with Nick) and the two embrace. Michael then goes home and lies down, where he dreams about a prank that he and Nick played on another friend while staying on Fire Island. Michael then sits down to edit a book and we see Nick on a boat.

Betty calls Michael to tell him that he left the umbrella when he came to dinner and then asks if he knows anything about Cecil "running off." Michael apologizes, assuming Betty is upset that Cecil left, but she instead tells him they should go out to a club called "Area" to celebrate. Nick calls Michael and tells him that he "can't take it anymore," and says goodbye. Immediately, Michael charters a sea plane to fly out to the island, but is interrupted by Robert who has decided not to go to Africa. Eventually, Michael makes it to Fire Island, where he finds Nick on the beach. The two argue about the direction of different countries and debate taking a trip. As they converse, Michael has flashbacks to their previous time on Fire Island together.

== Cast ==
- Richard Ganoung as Michael
- John Michael Bolger as Robert
- Steve Buscemi as Nick
- Adam Nathan as Peter
- Kathy Kinney as Joan
- Patrick Tull as Cecil
- Yolande Bavan as Betty
- Andre Morgan as Terry
- Richard Wall as Douglas
- Jim Selfe as Douglas's Sidekick
- Kristin Moneagle as Sarah
- John Siemens as Dave
- Bob Koherr (credited as Bob Kohrherr) as Sam
- Theodore Ganger as Klaus
- Nada as Liselotte

== Reception and legacy ==
Parting Glances gave Steve Buscemi his first major movie role. "It is to both his and the film's credit that the anguish of AIDS is presented as part of a larger social fabric, understood in context, and never in a maudlin light," said Janet Maslin in her New York Times review. Time Out London wrote “Sherwood brings a notable grace and droll humour to his story of two male lovers parting against the backdrop of a friend dying of the Big A.”

== Preservation and restoration ==
In 2006, Outfest and the UCLA Film and Television Archive announced that the film would be the first to be restored as a part of the Outfest Legacy Project.

On July 16, 2007, as a part of the Outfest Legacy Project, a restored print of Parting Glances received its world premiere at the Directors Guild of America in Los Angeles. The four major stars of the film, Richard Ganoung, John Bolger, Steve Buscemi, and Kathy Kinney, were in attendance and participated in a panel discussion after the viewing.

The restoration print received its New York City premiere on October 29, 2007, at the Lincoln Center for the Performing Arts.

== See also ==
- List of lesbian, gay, bisexual or transgender-related films
