= Stuart Charno =

American actor

- Born: September 29, 1956 (age 69); Queens, New York, U.S.
- Years active: 1981–2003, 2010

Stuart Charno (born September 29, 1956) is an American actor. He has been a stand-up comic and has starred in film and on television. His first role was in the 1981 horror film Friday the 13th Part 2. Other notable appearances of his include the 1985 comedy film Just One of the Guys (as Harold "Reptile" Sherpico) and the 1986 film Modern Girls, in which he appeared with Just One of the Guys co-star Clayton Rohner. Charno has made guest appearances on various television shows including M*A*S*H, The X-Files, Chicago Hope, Team Knight Rider, and Profiler. He also received story credits on three episodes of Star Trek: The Next Generation ("The Wounded", "New Ground" and "Ethics").

Charno is the uncle of current Ice Nine Kills lead guitarist Dan Sugarman.

== Filmography ==
=== Film ===
Year	Title	Role
1981	Friday the 13th Part 2	Ted
1981	The Chosen	1st Baseman
1982	Young Doctors in Love	The Hospital Staff – Warren the Orderly
1983	Christine	Don Vandenberg
1984	Hard to Hold	Techie
1985	Just One of the Guys	Reptile
1985	Once Bitten	Cabin Boy Vampire
1986	Modern Girls	Nerdy Guy
1992	Sleepwalkers	Police Photographer
2003	Alien Hunter	Abell
2010	Horrorween 3D	Uke Player
2013	Crystal Lake Memories: The Complete History of Friday the 13th	Himself

=== Television ===
Year	Title	Role	Notes
1982	M*A*S*H	Corp. Sonneborn	Episode: "Bombshells"
1982	Fame	Clerk	Episode: "A Tough Act to Follow"
1983	Svengali	Boomer	Television film
1983–1984	Buffalo Bill	Zwickey	2 episodes
1984	It's Your Move	Fred	Episode: "Dating Games"
1985	The Paper Chase		Episode: It's Only a Show
1985–1986	Newhart	Ernie	2 episodes
1987	Beauty and the Beast	Bennie	Episode: "Siege"
1988	Freddy's Nightmares	Jim	Episode: "Saturday Night Special"
1993	Good Advice	Howard	Episode: "Jack of Hearts"
1994	Dave's World	Ryan Beck	Episode: "The Last Auction Hero"
1994	The Adventure of Young Indiana Jones: Hollywood Follies	Camera Assistant	Television film
1995	The X-Files	The Puppet	Episode: "Clyde Bruckman's Final Repose"
1996–1997	Chicago Hope	Dr. Lloyd Chernow	Recurring role, 6 episodes
1997	The Pretender	Park Place Motel Owner	Episode: "Prison Story"
1998	Team Knight Rider	Engineer	Episode: "Apocalypse Maybe"
2000	Profiler	Mark Dolan	Episode: "Paradise Lost"
2002	BloodHounds, Inc	Larry	Episode: "Invasion of the UFOs"
2009	His Name Was Jason: 30 Years of Friday the 13th	Himself	Documentary film
