= Clayton Landey =

American actor (born 1951)

- Born: March 24, 1951 (age 75); New York City, New York, U.S.
- Occupation: Actor
- Spouse: Lin Shaye (m. 1988; div. 2003)
- Children: 1

Clayton Landey (born March 24, 1951) is an American television, film, and stage actor. He played attorney James Westmont in the TV series Knots Landing from 1982-1983 and Gregory on Days of Our Lives for 1 year.

== Early life and education ==
Landey was raised in the Bronx and attended high school in Spring Valley, New York. He attended the University of Houston where he played on the soccer team. He obtained a bachelor of arts in drama from the university in May 1973.

== Career ==
He starred as Roger Barrow in the first season of 1st & Ten, the first scripted half hour comedy original series on HBO. Landey has had recurring roles in TV series including 3 seasons as attorney James Westmont on Knots Landing and 1 year as the evil Gregory on Days of Our Lives. He guest starred in the initial season of Tales and starred in the film Down 4 Whatever for TV One.

Other shows with multiple episodes include: Dynasty, Walker, Texas Ranger, Without a Trace, and Stargate: Atlantis. Most recently, Landey recurred for two seasons on If Loving You Is Wrong. He starred in the pilot Used Cars for CBS and guest starred in the pilot SNOOPS. He appeared in the Sliders episode (5/14) "Heavy Metal" (1999). His work has been represented at the Cannes (She’s So Lovely), Sundance (Shadow Hours) and Venice (The Reluctant Fundamentalist) Film Festivals. Norma Rae, Clayton’s first feature, was named in 2011 to The Library of Congress National Film Registry.

Landey has appeared in over forty theatrical productions in New York, Los Angeles, Atlanta and Dallas. He played Luther Adler in the production of Names at the Matrix Theater in Los Angeles. He recreated the role the following season in the off-Broadway production.

Landey also produced Andrea’s Got Two Boyfriends. He teaches Scene Study For The Working Actor and Get Out of Your Head at the Alliance Theatre.

== Awards ==
He received a Drama-Logue Award, an LA Weekly Award, a Maddy, a Garland Award and a Los Angeles Drama Critics Circle nomination for his performance as Luther Adler in the production of Names at the Matrix Theater in Los Angeles.

He also received a Drama-Logue for producing Andrea’s Got Two Boyfriends.

== Filmography ==
Year	Title	Role	Notes
1978	The Million Dollar Dixie Deliverance	Confederate Soldier	
1979	Norma Rae	Teddy Bob Keeler	
1980	Everything Happens to Me		
1986	Quiet Cool	Cairo	
1987	A Nightmare on Elm Street 3: Dream Warriors	Lorenzo	
1987	Fatal Beauty	Jimmy Silver	
1988	Assault of the Killer Bimbos	Hernandez	
1988	The Blob	George Ruit	
1990	Heart Condition	Posner's Assistant	
1990	The First Power	Mazza	
1990	Pump Up the Volume	"Shep" Sheppard	
1990	Book of Love	"Snake"	
1991	Going Under	O'Neill	
1993	Ghost in the Machine	Mel	
1994	Blind Justice	Ernie Fowler	
1995	Tank Girl	Guard At Front Entrance	
1996	Eraser	WitSec Agent	
1997	She's So Lovely	Attendant #1	
1998	A Civil Action	Grace Worker	
2000	Shadow Hours	The Announcer	
2000	Price of Glory	Boxing Official	
2001	Wish You Were Dead	Laughy Hitman	
2002	Man of the Year	Stuart	
2006	Intellectual Property	Vladimir	
2006	A.I. Assault	Major Steve Tyler	TV movie
2008	Zombie Strippers	Cheneyco #1	Uncredited
2010	Killer by Nature	Death Row Guard	
2011	Footloose	Coach Guerntz	
2012	The Reluctant Fundamentalist	Agent Jackson	
2012	Trouble with the Curve	Manager	
2012	Undocumented Executive	Ken Worthington	
2013	Scary Movie 5	Sodomized Cop	
2015	Nocturna	Mayor	
2016	A Sunday Horse	Bobby	
2016	Sully	Arnie Gentile	
2017	Camera Store	Dr. Dave Lobell	
2021	Bingo Hell	Morris	
