= Bill Sherwood =

American musician, screenwriter and film director

- Born: William Charles Patrick Sherwood; June 14, 1952; Washington, D.C., U.S.
- Died: February 10, 1990 (aged 37); New York City, New York, U.S.
- Occupations: Film director, screenwriter, musician

William Charles Patrick Sherwood (June 14, 1952 – February 10, 1990), better known as Bill Sherwood, was an American musician, screenwriter and film director.

Sherwood was born in Washington, D.C., and grew up in Battle Creek, Michigan. A talented violinist, he attended the National Music Camp and graduated from the Interlochen Arts Academy in Michigan in 1970, where he majored in composition. He then moved to New York City, where he was a composition student of Elliott Carter at The Juilliard School. Discouraged by his progress and fascinated by the cultural and social upheavals going on in New York at the time, he discontinued his composition studies, eventually enrolling at Hunter College. He majored in Film Production and made several short films over the next ten years.

He had a promising career as a filmmaker, but died in New York City from AIDS complications. He is best known for his 1986 film Parting Glances, made for $310,000, a bittersweet romantic comedy that spans a 24-hour period in the upwardly mobile New York gay community. He wrote half a dozen screenplays and completed three short films in the six years before Parting Glances, and wrote additional screenplays in the four years after. These additional screenplays were never produced.

== Filmography ==
- Parting Glances (1986) - Director/Editor/Screenwriter
