= Anita Rosenberg =

American director of eighties cult films

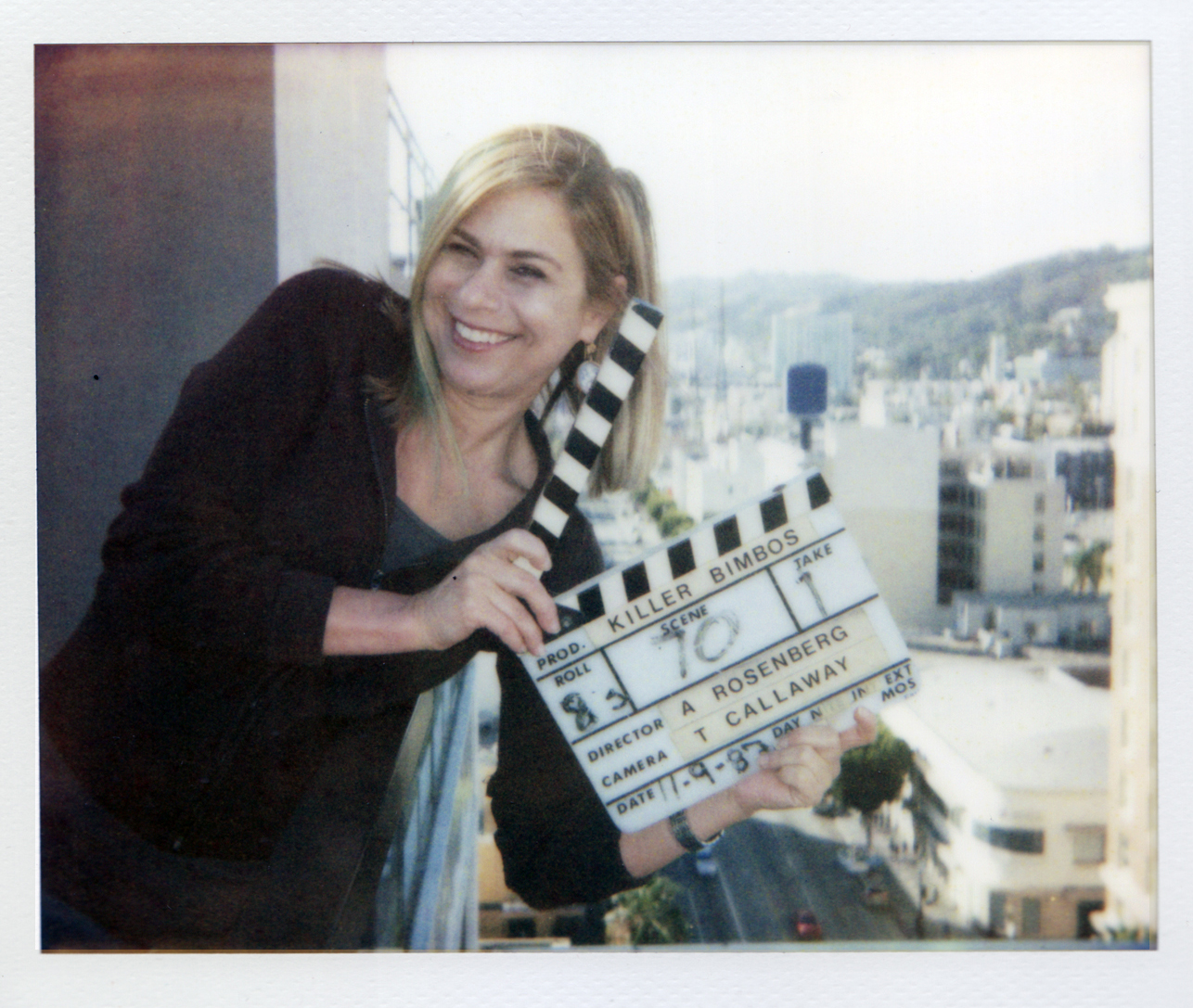
- Anita Rosenberg holding clapboard for Assault of the Killer Bimbos in 2012.
- Education: NYU Graduate Film School; San Francisco Art Institute
- Occupations: Artist, filmmaker
- Website: www.anitarosenberg.com

Anita Rosenberg is an American filmmaker and artist. She wrote and produced the film Modern Girls and wrote and directed the film Assault of the Killer Bimbos. In her later career she worked as a sculptor and feng shui practitioner.

== Biography ==
Rosenberg is from Cincinnati, Ohio and graduated from Walnut Hills High School. She attended San Francisco Art Institute where she earned a BFA, and later graduated from NYU Graduate Film School with a Master's degree.

After graduating from NYU in 1982, Rosenberg moved to Los Angeles to become a filmmaker. Her first film was the 1986 comedy Modern Girls, which she both wrote and produced. She became a film director in 1988 with the release of Assault of the Killer Bimbos.

Rosenberg is a sculptor and her art was used in the film Modern Girls. Her artwork was also used on the set of The Middle. She is also the niece of illustrator Manuel Rosenberg and a Feng shui practitioner.

Rosenberg released How to Be the Star of Your Life: Lessons from Hollywood & Beyond in 2024. The book contains 24 interviews with her celebrity friends and colleagues and documents their insights into succeeding in Hollywood. The book was a bronze medalist winner at the 2024 Independent Publisher Book Awards.

== Filmography ==
Year	Title	Role
1986	Modern Girls	Writer and producer
1988	Assault of the Killer Bimbos	Writer and director
