= Butch Rolle =

American football player (born 1964)

No. 87, 82
- Position: Tight end

Personal information
- Born: August 19, 1964 (age 62); Miami, Florida, U.S.
- Listed height: 6 ft 3 in (1.91 m)
- Listed weight: 242 lb (110 kg)

Career information
- High school: Hallandale Beach (Hallandale Beach, Florida)
- College: Michigan State
- NFL draft: 1986: 7th round, 180th overall pick

Career history
- Buffalo Bills (1986–1991); Phoenix Cardinals (1992–1993)

Career NFL statistics
- Receptions: 38
- Receiving yards: 213
- Touchdowns: 14
- Stats at Pro Football Reference

Donald Demetrius "Butch" Rolle (born August 19, 1964) is an American former professional football player who was a tight end in the National Football League (NFL) for the Buffalo Bills and Phoenix Cardinals. He was selected by the Bills in the seventh round of the 1986 NFL draft with the 180th overall pick. While playing for Buffalo, he had a streak of 10 consecutive receptions for touchdowns. He played college football for the Michigan State Spartans.
