= Tyler Huntley =

American football player (born 1998)

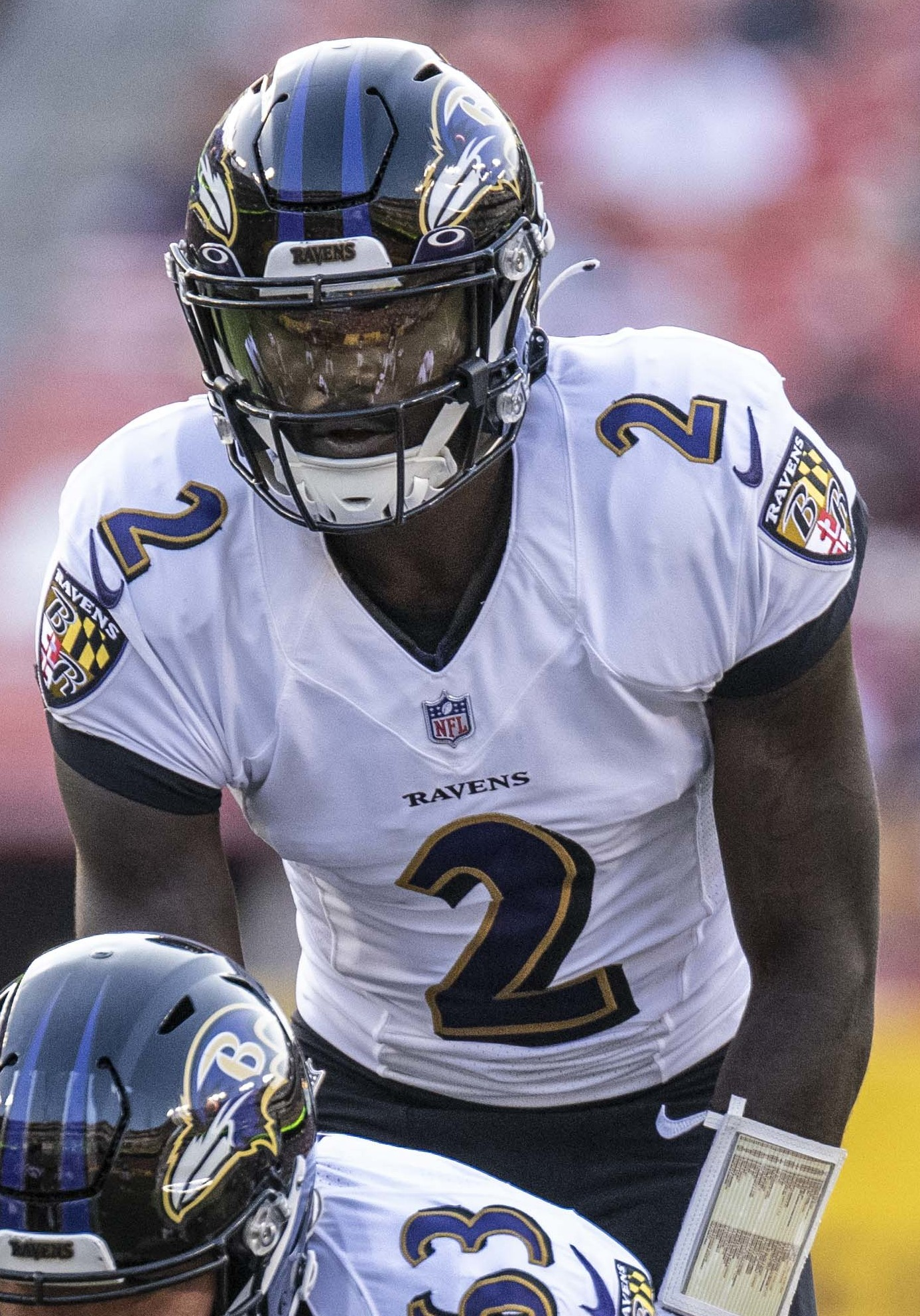
- Huntley with the Baltimore Ravens in 2021

No. 5 – Baltimore Ravens
- Position: Quarterback
- Roster status: Injured reserve

Personal information
- Born: February 3, 1998 (age 28); Dania Beach, Florida, U.S.
- Listed height: 6 ft 1 in (1.85 m)
- Listed weight: 204 lb (93 kg)

Career information
- High school: Hallandale (Hallandale Beach, Florida)
- College: Utah (2016–2019)
- NFL draft: 2020: undrafted

Career history
- Baltimore Ravens (2020–2023); Cleveland Browns (2024)*; Baltimore Ravens (2024)*; Miami Dolphins (2024); Cleveland Browns (2025)*; Baltimore Ravens (2025–present)
- * Offseason or practice squad member only

Awards and highlights
- Pro Bowl (2022); First-team All-Pac-12 (2019)

Career NFL statistics as of 2026
- Passing attempts: 652
- Passing completions: 435
- Completion percentage: 66.7%
- TD–INT: 17–11
- Passing yards: 3,939
- Passer rating: 84.5
- Rushing yards: 871
- Rushing touchdowns: 6
- Stats at Pro Football Reference

Tyler Isaiah Huntley (born February 3, 1998) is an American professional football quarterback for the Baltimore Ravens of the National Football League (NFL). Nicknamed "Snoop", he played college football for the Utah Utes, leading them to consecutive Pac-12 South Division titles between 2018 and 2019 and receiving first-team conference honors during the latter. Huntley was signed by the Ravens as an undrafted free agent in 2020.

Beginning his career as backup to Lamar Jackson, Huntley helped the Ravens make the playoffs in 2022 in relief of an injured Jackson and was selected to the Pro Bowl. After four seasons with Baltimore, Huntley played for the Miami Dolphins in 2024 before rejoining the Ravens the following year.

== Early life ==
Huntley attended Hallandale High School in Hallandale Beach, Florida. During his career, he passed for 9,053 yards and 106 touchdowns. As a senior, he was the Florida Gatorade Football Player of the Year. He committed to the University of Utah to play college football, where he played alongside high school teammate Zack Moss.

== College career ==
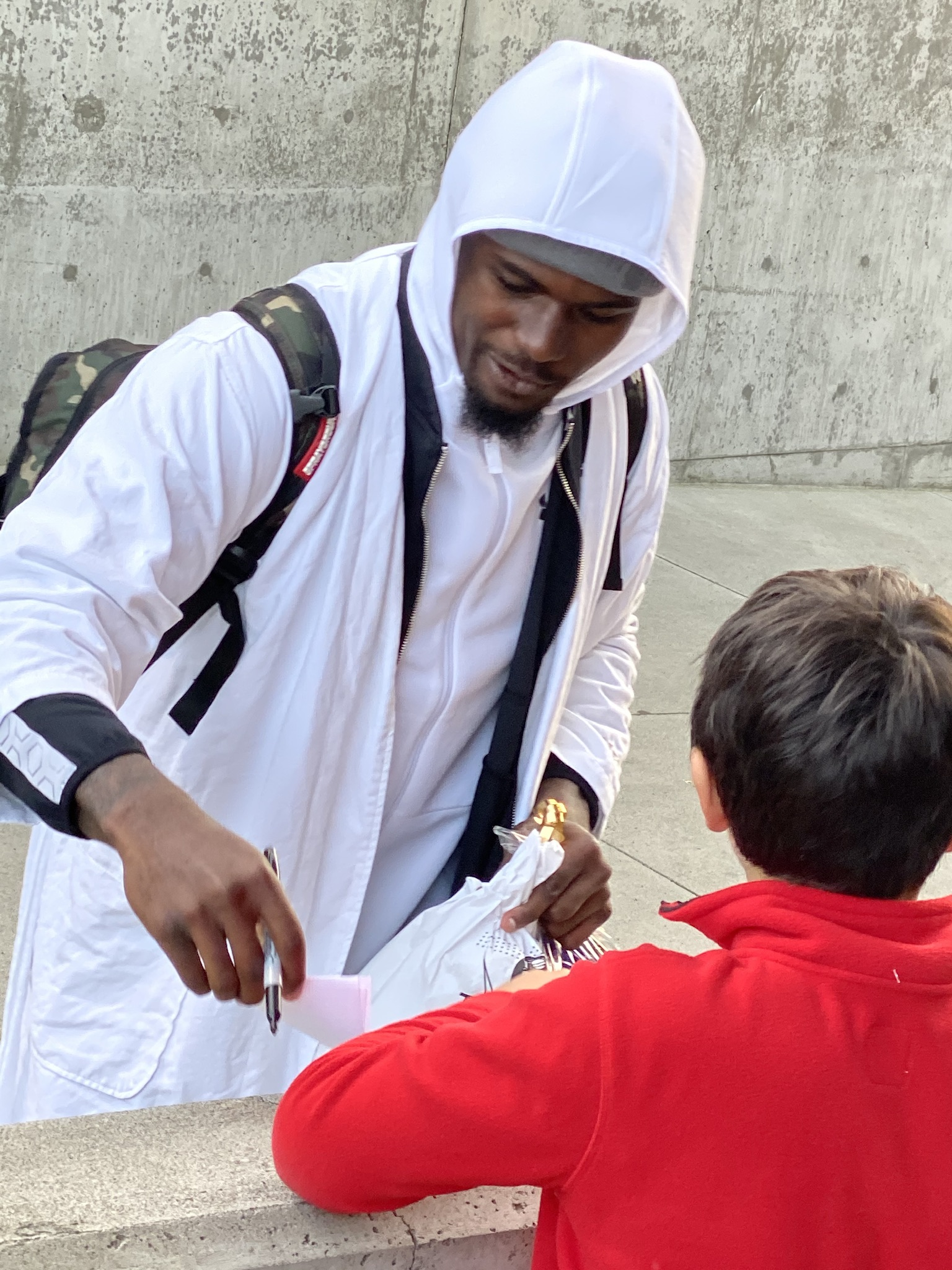
Huntley signing autographs in 2019

As a true freshman at Utah in 2016, Huntley played in four games as a backup to Troy Williams. Huntley was named the starter over Williams in 2017. He started 10 games, missing three due to injury and completed 199 of 312 passes for 2,411 yards, 15 touchdowns and 10 interceptions. Huntley started the first nine games of his junior year in 2018, missing the last five due to injury, finishing the season by completing 150 of 234 passes for 1,788 yards, 12 touchdowns and six interceptions. He returned as the starter his senior year in 2019, finishing his college career with 14 games, leading the Utes to the Pac-12 Conference final, passing for 3,092 yards and 19 touchdowns with just four interceptions, and rushing for another five touchdowns.

== Professional career ==
Pre-draft measurables
| Height | Weight | Arm length | Hand span | Wingspan |
|---|---|---|---|---|
| 6 ft 0 5/8 in (1.84 m) | 196 lb (89 kg) | 31 3/4 in (0.81 m) | 9 1/4 in (0.23 m) | 6 ft 7 7/8 in (2.03 m) |
All values from Pro Day

=== Baltimore Ravens (first stint) ===
==== 2020 season ====
Huntley signed with the Baltimore Ravens as an undrafted free agent on April 30, 2020. He was waived on September 5 and signed to the team's practice squad the next day. Following injuries/COVID-19 issues with the Ravens' three other quarterbacks, Huntley was elevated to the active roster for the team's Week 12, 15, 16, and 17 games against the Pittsburgh Steelers, Jacksonville Jaguars, New York Giants, and Cincinnati Bengals, and reverted to the practice squad after each game. He made his NFL debut in the fourth quarter against the Jaguars in Week 15, when Huntley stepped in for starter Lamar Jackson and went 2-of-4 for seven yards, along with four rushes for 18 rushing yards (which included two kneel downs) as the Ravens won 40–14. Against the Bengals, as the game quickly became a Ravens' blowout, Huntley entered the game late in the third quarter. He completed one pass attempt for eight yards while rushing six times for five yards as the Ravens won 38–3. He was elevated again for the team's Wild Card and Divisional playoff games against the Tennessee Titans and Buffalo Bills, and reverted to the practice squad following each game. Huntley played the entire fourth quarter of the Bills game after Jackson was knocked out with a concussion, going 6-of-13 with 60 passing yards, along with three rushes for 32 yards, as the Ravens lost 3–17.

==== 2021 season ====
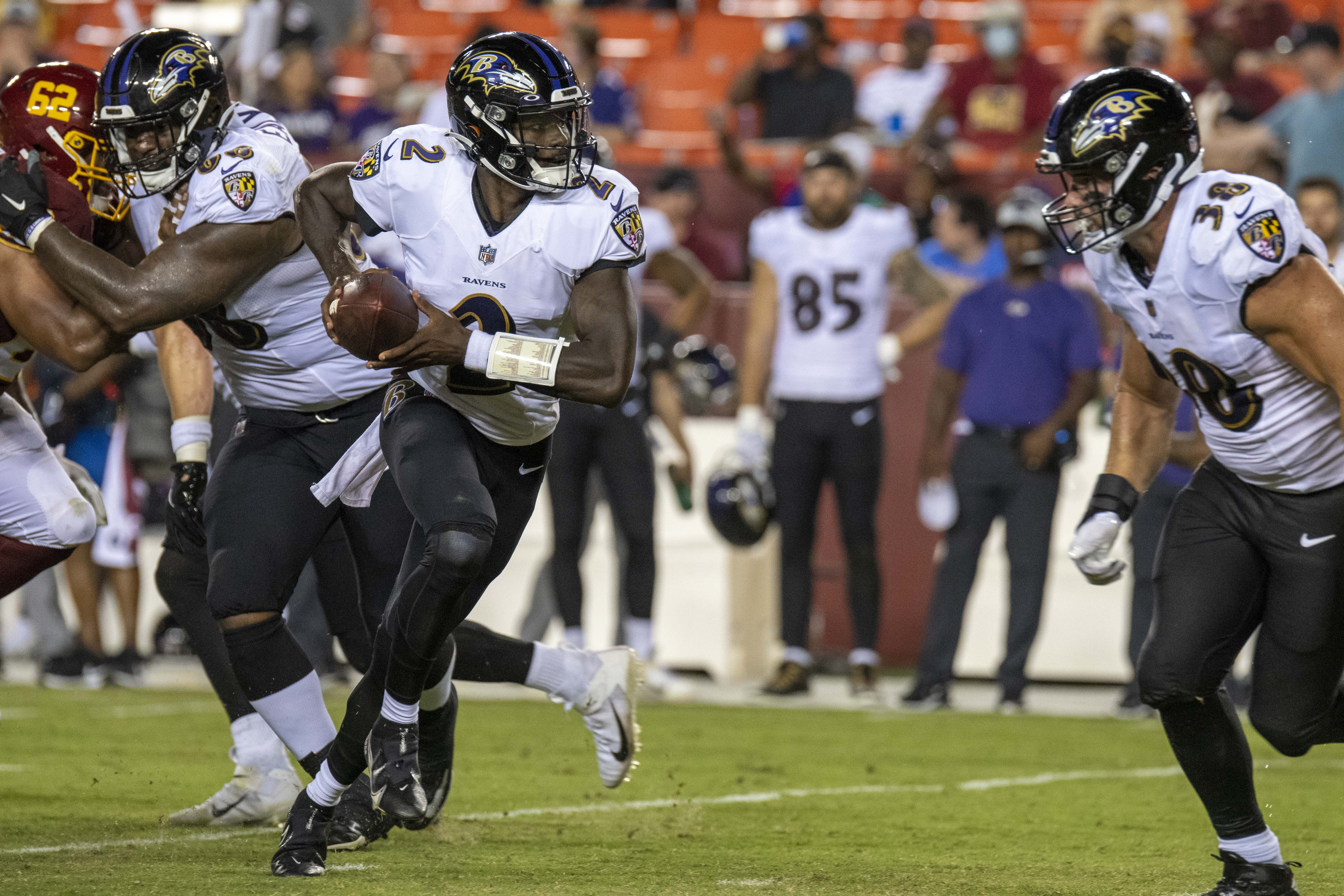
Huntley in action against the Washington Football Team in 2021

On January 18, 2021, Huntley signed a reserve/futures contract with the Ravens. Huntley had three rushing attempts for ten yards in the Ravens' blowout win over the Los Angeles Chargers in Week 6, and came in to relieve Lamar Jackson during the Ravens’ blowout loss to the Bengals in Week 7, finishing the game with 5-of-11 pass completions for 39 yards. Huntley got his first NFL start on November 21 when Jackson was not able to play due to a non-Covid illness against the Chicago Bears. Huntley threw for 219 yards, an interception, rushed for 40 yards, and led the team on a last-minute game-winning touchdown drive in the fourth quarter of their 16–13 win. In Week 14 against the Browns, following Jackson's injury late in the first quarter, Huntley came into the game, completed 27-of-38 passes for 270 yards and a touchdown, but narrowly lost 22–24. The injury also prevented Jackson from playing the next week, and Huntley started his second career game in Week 15 against the Green Bay Packers. He completed 28-of-40 pass attempts for 215 yards and two touchdowns, while rushing for another 73 yards and two touchdowns on the ground. However, the Ravens lost 30–31, following a failed last-minute two-point conversion.

On December 24, it was reported that Huntley was expected to start again due to Jackson's injured ankle. On Christmas Day, Huntley was put on the Reserve/COVID-19 list, rendering him unable to start against the Bengals. On December 30, Huntley was activated and named the starter for the Ravens against the Los Angeles Rams and the Steelers in Weeks 17 and 18 respectively. Both games ended in losses, capping off a six-week stretch of losses that eliminated the Ravens from playoff contention.

==== 2022 season ====
The Ravens placed an exclusive-rights free agent tender on Huntley on March 9, 2022. Huntley saw his first action of the season in Week 12, playing one snap in the 27–28 loss to the Jacksonville Jaguars. In Week 13 against the Denver Broncos, Huntley saw play after Lamar Jackson was forced out with a knee injury in the first quarter. In a low-scoring affair, Huntley led a game-winning drive in the final three minutes that he capped off with a two-yard touchdown run for the 10–9 win. He finished with 27-of-32 pass attempts for 187 yards and an interception to go along with 10 carries for 41 yards and the aforementioned touchdown. Jackson's injury would ultimately cause him to miss the rest of the season. Huntley started in Week 14 against the Pittsburgh Steelers, but was knocked out of the game in the third quarter with a concussion and replaced by rookie Anthony Brown, although the Ravens would still win 16–14. Huntley went 8-of-12 pass completions for 88 yards and rushed 9 times for 31 yards. Huntley returned the following week, but had a poor performance in a 3–13 loss to the Browns. He also suffered in an injury in his right shoulder. In Week 16 against the Atlanta Falcons, Huntley completed 9-of-17 passes for 115 passing yards and a touchdown as the Ravens clinched a playoff berth with a 17–9 win. After a 13–16 loss to the Steelers in Week 17, Huntley would be rested in Week 18 against the Cincinnati Bengals. Brown started instead in a 16–27 loss. He was named the starter for the team's Wild Card playoff game against the Bengals, completing 17-of-29 passes for 226 yards, two touchdowns, an interception and a fumble returned for a touchdown in a 24–17 loss.

On January 31, 2023, Huntley was named to the 2023 Pro Bowl as an injury replacement for Bills' quarterback Josh Allen. Huntley had finished seventh in Pro Bowl fan voting among AFC quarterbacks. His selection was met with shock and questions as to its worthiness, owing to his comparatively poor regular-season statistics, as well as a small sample size of just four games as a starter.

==== 2023 season ====
On March 15, 2023, the Ravens placed a tender on Huntley that allowed them to match another team's contract offer as they continued negotiations on a new contract. He officially signed the tender, which was worth $2.627 million, on April 24.

Huntley made appearances in five games during the regular season, the first four of which came in relief of Jackson in blowout wins. With the Ravens clinching the #1 seed in Week 17, Huntley was declared the starter for the season's final game against the Pittsburgh Steelers. He threw for 146 yards and a touchdown while rushing for an additional 40 yards in a 17–10 loss.

=== Cleveland Browns (first stint) ===
On March 20, 2024, Huntley signed with the Cleveland Browns. On August 29, Huntley was released after making the 53-man roster due to a lack of trade interest.

=== Baltimore Ravens (second stint) ===
On August 30, 2024, Huntley was signed to the Ravens' practice squad to fill the third-string quarterback role.

=== Miami Dolphins ===
On September 16, 2024, Huntley was signed off the Baltimore Ravens' practice squad by the Miami Dolphins, who were looking to strengthen the quarterback position after starter Tua Tagovailoa was sidelined due to concussion protocol. He began with the Dolphins as the third-string quarterback, behind Skylar Thompson and Tim Boyle. Following an injury to Thompson, Huntley was named the starter for the Dolphins' Week 4 game against the Tennessee Titans, with Boyle serving as his backup. He would throw for 96 yards and rush for 40 yards in a 31–12 loss. Huntley would lead the Dolphins to a 15–10 win over the New England Patriots in Week 5 throwing for 194 yards and rushing for 7 yards. Huntley would start Week 7 against the Indianapolis Colts though he would get injured in the third quarter after a right shoulder injury. Huntley started the Week 17 game against the Cleveland Browns in place of Tagovailoa, who was injured. He led the team to a 20–3 win with 225 passing yards and one passing touchdown to go with seven carries for 52 rushing yards and a rushing touchdown. Huntley would start the following Week against the New York Jets, where he would complete 25 of 41 passes and throw for 227 yards in a 32–20 loss.

=== Cleveland Browns (second stint) ===
On August 5, 2025, Huntley signed with the Browns. After competing for a roster spot with Joe Flacco, Kenny Pickett, Dillon Gabriel, and Shedeur Sanders, Huntley was ultimately released by the Browns on August 24.

=== Baltimore Ravens (third stint) ===
==== 2025 season ====
On August 27, 2025, Huntley was signed to the Baltimore Ravens' practice squad to fill the third-string quarterback role. He was signed to the active roster on October 24. On October 26, 2025, he started his first game of the season, filling in for the injured Lamar Jackson and over second-string quarterback Cooper Rush, ending a four-game Ravens losing streak with a 30–16 win over the Chicago Bears. It was described as "arguably the best game of his six-year career", as he went 17-of-22 for 186 yards passing and one touchdown, as well as rushing for 53 yards, including a 29-yard run, the longest of his career. After kneeling out the 24–0 rout over the Cincinnati Bengals in Week 15, Huntley would be forced into the Week 16 game against the New England Patriots after Jackson suffered a back injury late in the second quarter. He threw for 101 yards and rushed for 7 yards, but the Ravens would blow a fourth-quarter lead and lose 24–28. In another must-win Week 17 game against the Green Bay Packers, Huntley started with Jackson still injured. He would throw for 107 yards and a touchdown while adding 60 yards rushing in a 41–24 win to keep the Ravens' playoff hopes alive.

==== 2026 season ====
On March 7, 2026, Huntley signed a two-year, $5 million contract extension with Baltimore worth up to $11 million with incentives. Following an injury to Jackson, Huntley played the entire 2nd half of the Ravens' 24–18 Week 4 win over the Tennessee Titans. He was named the starter for the Ravens' Week 5 game against the Atlanta Falcons. Huntley completed 24 of 32 passes for two touchdowns and rushed for 20 yards on six carries and a game-winning touchdown as the Ravens won 30–23 in overtime. Huntley would go on to start the Ravens' next two games, losses to the Cleveland Browns and Cincinnati Bengals.

In a Week 8 game against the Buffalo Bills, Huntley again entered the lineup after Jackson suffered a thumb injury on the Ravens' first offensive play. However, Huntley suffered a turf toe injury shortly after, forcing him from the remainder of the game. On November 4, 2026, Huntley was placed on injured reserve for season ending turf toe injury.

== Career statistics ==
Legend
| **Bold** | Career high |

=== NFL ===
==== Regular season ====
| Year | Team | Games | | | Passing | | | | | | | | | Rushing | | | | | Fumbles | |
| Year | Team | GP | GS | Record | Cmp | Att | Pct | Yds | Y/A | Lng | TD | Int | Rtg | Att | Yds | Avg | Lng | TD | Fum | Lost |
|---|---|---|---|---|---|---|---|---|---|---|---|---|---|---|---|---|---|---|---|---|
| 2020 | BAL | 2 | 0 | — | 3 | 5 | 60.0 | 15 | 3.0 | 8 | 0 | 0 | 64.6 | 10 | 23 | 2.3 | 19 | 0 | 0 | 0 |
| 2021 | BAL | 7 | 4 | 1–3 | **122** | **188** | 64.9 | **1,081** | 5.8 | 43 | 3 | **4** | 76.6 | **47** | **294** | **6.3** | 21 | **2** | 4 | **3** |
| 2022 | BAL | 6 | 4 | 2–2 | 75 | 112 | 67.0 | 658 | 5.9 | 40 | 2 | 3 | 77.2 | 43 | 137 | 3.2 | 14 | 1 | 3 | 0 |
| 2023 | BAL | 5 | 1 | 0–1 | 21 | 37 | 56.8 | 203 | 5.5 | 27 | 3 | 0 | 99.3 | 15 | 55 | 3.7 | 11 | 0 | 0 | 0 |
| 2024 | MIA | 5 | 5 | 2–3 | 86 | 133 | 64.7 | 829 | 6.2 | 25 | 3 | 3 | 80.1 | 26 | 135 | 5.2 | 20 | **2** | **6** | 2 |
| 2025 | BAL | 5 | 2 | 2–0 | 52 | 67 | **77.6** | 426 | 6.4 | 36 | 2 | 0 | **103.1** | 24 | 151 | **6.3** | **29** | 0 | 0 | 0 |
| 2026 | BAL | 5 | 3 | 1–2 | 76 | 110 | 69.1 | 727 | **6.6** | **48** | **4** | 1 | 95.5 | 18 | 76 | 4.5 | 15 | 1 | 1 | 0 |
| Career | | 35 | 19 | 8–11 | 435 | 652 | 66.7 | 3,939 | 6.0 | 48 | 17 | 11 | 84.5 | 183 | 871 | 4.8 | 29 | 6 | 14 | 5 |

==== Postseason ====
| Year | Team | Games | | | Passing | | | | | | | | | Rushing | | | | | Fumbles | |
| Year | Team | GP | GS | Record | Cmp | Att | Pct | Yds | Y/A | Lng | TD | Int | Rtg | Att | Yds | Avg | Lng | TD | Fum | Lost |
|---|---|---|---|---|---|---|---|---|---|---|---|---|---|---|---|---|---|---|---|---|
| 2020 | BAL | 1 | 0 | — | 6 | 13 | 46.2 | 60 | 4.6 | 29 | 0 | 0 | 59.8 | 3 | 32 | **10.7** | 19 | 0 | **1** | 0 |
| 2022 | BAL | 1 | 1 | 0–1 | **17** | **29** | **58.6** | **226** | **7.8** | **41** | **2** | **1** | **92.0** | **9** | **54** | 6.0 | **35** | 0 | **1** | **1** |
| 2023 | BAL | 0 | 0 | — | DNP | | | | | | | | | | | | | | | |
| Career | | 2 | 1 | 0–1 | 23 | 42 | 54.8 | 286 | 6.8 | 41 | 2 | 1 | 82.0 | 12 | 86 | 7.2 | 35 | 0 | 2 | 1 |

=== College ===
College statistics
| Season | Team | Games | | | Passing | | | | | | | Rushing | | | |
| Season | Team | GP | GS | Record | Cmp | Att | Pct | Yds | TD | Int | Rtg | Att | Yds | Avg | TD |
|---|---|---|---|---|---|---|---|---|---|---|---|---|---|---|---|
| 2016 | Utah | 4 | 0 | 0–0 | 5 | 7 | 71.4 | 60 | 0 | 0 | 143.4 | 9 | 15 | 1.7 | 1 |
| 2017 | Utah | 10 | 10 | 6–4 | 199 | **312** | 63.8 | 2,411 | 15 | **10** | 138.1 | **168** | **537** | **3.2** | **6** |
| 2018 | Utah | 9 | 9 | 6–3 | 150 | 234 | 64.1 | 1,788 | 12 | 6 | 140.1 | 108 | 304 | 2.8 | 4 |
| 2019 | Utah | 14 | 14 | **11–3** | **220** | 301 | **73.1** | **3,092** | **19** | 4 | **177.6** | 104 | 290 | 2.8 | 5 |
| Career | | 37 | 33 | 23–10 | 574 | 854 | 67.2 | 7,351 | 46 | 20 | 152.6 | 389 | 1,146 | 2.9 | 16 |
