= Zack Moss =

American football player (born 1997)

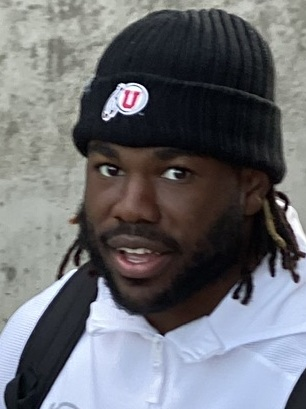
- Moss with Utah in 2019

Profile
- Position: Running back

Personal information
- Born: December 15, 1997 (age 28); Hialeah Gardens, Florida, U.S.
- Listed height: 5 ft 10 in (1.78 m)
- Listed weight: 220 lb (100 kg)

Career information
- High school: Hallandale (Hallandale Beach, Florida)
- College: Utah (2016–2019)
- NFL draft: 2020: 3rd round, 86th overall pick

Career history
- Buffalo Bills (2020–2022); Indianapolis Colts (2022–2023); Cincinnati Bengals (2024)

Awards and highlights
- Pac-12 Offensive Player of the Year (2019); First-team All-Pac-12 (2019); Second-team All-Pac-12 (2018)

Career NFL statistics as of 2024
- Rushing yards: 2,318
- Rushing average: 4.2
- Rushing touchdowns: 16
- Receptions: 98
- Receiving yards: 710
- Receiving touchdowns: 5
- Stats at Pro Football Reference

Zaccheus Malik Moss (born December 15, 1997) is an American professional football running back. He played college football for the Utah Utes and was selected by the Buffalo Bills in the third round of the 2020 NFL draft.

== Early life ==
Moss attended Mater Academy Charter School in Hialeah Gardens, Florida before transferring to Hallandale High School in Hallandale Beach, Florida for his senior year. As a senior, he played alongside future college teammate Tyler Huntley and he ran for 1,098 yards on 145 carries with 17 touchdowns. He originally committed to the University of Miami to play college football but changed to the University of Utah.

== College career ==
=== 2016–2018 seasons ===
As a freshman at Utah in 2016, Moss played in 10 games with three starts and rushed for 382 yards and two touchdowns on 84 carries. As a sophomore in 2017, he started 12 of 13 games, rushing for 1,173 yards on 214 carries with 10 touchdowns. As a junior in 2018, Moss started the first nine games of the season before suffering a season-ending knee during practice.

=== 2019 season ===
Moss returned for his senior year in 2019 after healing from the previous season's injury. He started in 11 of 12 regular season games his senior year. In the regular season he rushed for 1,246 yards, 15 touchdowns, and averaged 6.2 yards per rush. With that effort he became the first 3-time 1,000 yard rusher in school history. During a week 7 game against Arizona State, Moss became the all-time leading rusher at the University of Utah. Moss and the Utes clinched their second Pac-12 south title on November 30, 2019, and played in the Pac-12 championship game against Oregon University on Friday, December 6, 2019. The Utes played against the Texas Longhorns in the Alamo Bowl on December 31, 2019, but lost 38–10. In the bowl game, Moss had 16 carries for 57 rushing yards and two receptions for 14 receiving yards.

Moss was the Pac-12 Offensive Player of the Year in his senior year. He finished his college career with 4,067 rushing yards and 38 rushing touchdowns, both Utah school records, in addition to 688 career receiving yards and three touchdown receptions.

== Professional career ==
Pre-draft measurables
Height	Weight	Arm length	Hand span	Wingspan	40-yard dash	10-yard split	20-yard split	20-yard shuttle	Vertical jump	Bench press
5 ft 9 3/8 in (1.76 m)	223 lb (101 kg)	31 1/4 in (0.79 m)	9 1/4 in (0.23 m)	6 ft 3 1/2 in (1.92 m)	4.65 s	1.67 s	2.78 s	4.37 s	33.0 in (0.84 m)	19 reps
All values from NFL Combine

=== Buffalo Bills ===
==== 2020 ====
The Buffalo Bills selected Moss in the third round with the 86th overall pick in the 2020 NFL draft.

Moss signed a four-year, $4.522 million contract with the Bills on June 15, 2020. In his NFL debut in Week 1 of the 2020 season against the New York Jets, Moss scored a four-yard receiving touchdown from quarterback Josh Allen. In Week 8 against the New England Patriots, he had 14 carries for 81 rushing yards and two rushing touchdowns in the 24–21 victory. Splitting carries with Devin Singletary throughout the season, Moss finished with the second most rushing yards on the team, with 481 yards and four touchdowns on 112 carries. In addition, he caught 14 passes for 95 yards and a touchdown.

Moss made his NFL playoff debut in the wild card round against the Indianapolis Colts. He rushed for 21 yards and caught four passes for 26 yards before suffering an ankle injury and being carted off. On January 12, 2021, Moss was placed on injured reserve due to the injury.

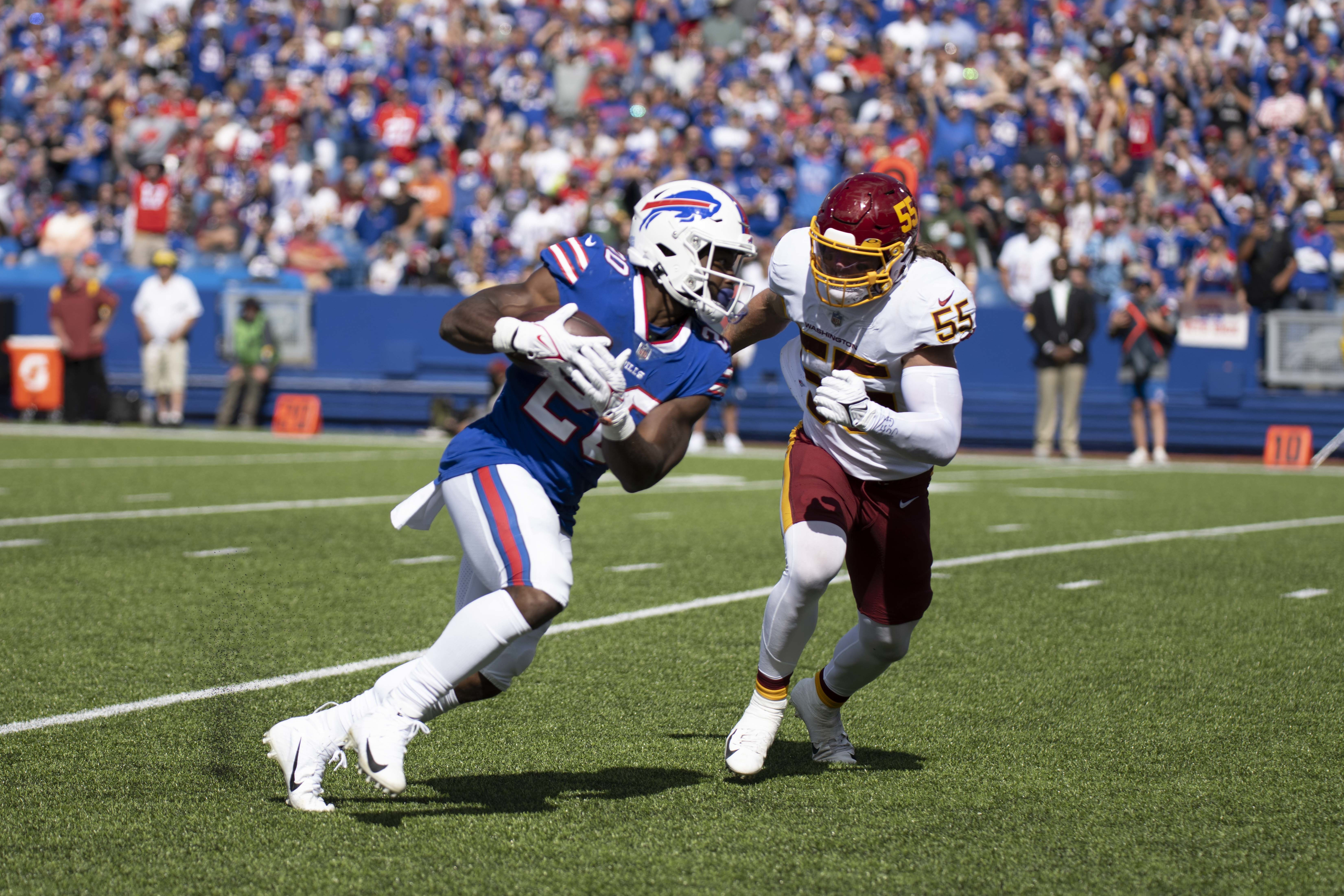
Moss against the Washington Football Team in 2021

==== 2021 ====
Moss was a healthy scratch for the Bills in Week 1 against the Pittsburgh Steelers, as the team opted to play Matt Breida in his stead. The following week against the Miami Dolphins, Moss made his season debut one day after attending his aunt's funeral. Despite fumbling early in the game, Moss finished the game with two touchdowns scored along with 26 rush yards on eight carries, in addition to two passes caught for eight yards, as the Bills won 35–0. On his second touchdown, he collided with Miami linebacker Elandon Roberts before regaining his composure and powering into the endzone. In Week 3 against the Washington Football Team, Moss finished as Buffalo's leading rusher, finishing with 60 yards on 13 carries in a 43–21 win. He also caught three passes for 31 yards and a touchdown.

==== 2022 ====
Moss played in five games for the Bills in 2022 season, rushing for 91 yards and catching seven passes for 27 yards.

=== Indianapolis Colts ===
==== 2022 ====
On November 1, 2022, the Buffalo Bills traded Moss along with a conditional sixth-round pick in the 2023 NFL draft to the Colts for running back Nyheim Hines. Due to an injury to starter Jonathan Taylor, Moss became the Colts' primary running back starting with the team's game against the Los Angeles Chargers.

==== 2023 ====
On July 31, 2023, Moss sustained a broken arm and had surgery the following day. In his season debut, Moss rushed for 88 yards on 18 attempts and a touchdown in the Colts 31–20 win over the Houston Texans. In their Week 3 game against the Baltimore Ravens, Moss carried the ball 30 times for 122 yards as well as catching a 17-yard pass for a touchdown. On October 2, Jonathan Taylor returned to practice off the PUP list, making Moss split carries. In Week 5 against the Tennessee Titans, Moss had 23 carries for 165 yards, and two touchdowns as well as two receptions for 30 yards in the 23–16 victory. Moss maintained a prominent role in the offense despite Taylor's return, and finished as the Colts leading rusher with a career-high 794 rushing yards and five touchdowns, and 27 catches for 192 yards and two touchdowns through 14 games and eight starts.

=== Cincinnati Bengals ===
Moss signed a two-year contract with the Cincinnati Bengals on March 11, 2024. He was named the starting running back to begin the season. Moss scored the Bengals' first touchdown of the season in their Week 1 loss to the New England Patriots. Moss logged 74 carries for 242 yards and 2 touchdowns over 8 games before he was placed on injured reserve with a neck injury on November 5, and would miss the rest of the season. On July 30, 2025, the Bengals released Moss.

== Career statistics ==
=== NFL ===
Legend
**Bold**	Career high

==== Regular season ====
Year	Team	Games		Rushing					Receiving					Fumbles	
Year	Team	GP	GS	Att	Yds	Avg	Lng	TD	Rec	Yds	Avg	Lng	TD	Fum	Lost
2020	BUF	13	0	112	481	4.3	31	4	14	95	6.8	20	1	0	0
2021	BUF	13	0	96	345	3.6	17	4	23	**197**	**8.6**	24	1	**2**	**1**
2022	BUF	5	0	17	91	**5.4**	43	0	7	27	3.9	8	0	1	**1**
2022	IND	8	3	76	365	4.8	34	1	4	12	3.0	5	0	0	0
2023	IND	**14**	**8**	**183**	**794**	4.3	**56**	**5**	**27**	192	7.1	**26**	**2**	0	0
2024	CIN	6	5	63	224	3.6	16	2	16	126	7.9	21	1	1	**1**
Career		59	16	547	2,300	4.2	56	16	91	649	6.2	26	5	4	3

==== Postseason ====
Year	Team	Games		Rushing					Receiving					Fumbles	
Year	Team	GP	GS	Att	Yds	Avg	Lng	TD	Rec	Yds	Avg	Lng	TD	Fum	Lost
2020	BUF	**1**	**1**	**7**	**21**	**3.0**	**8**	0	**4**	**26**	**6.5**	**10**	0	0	0
2021	BUF	**1**	0	1	0	0.0	0	0	0	0	0.0	0	0	0	0
Career		2	1	8	21	2.6	8	0	4	26	6.5	10	0	0	0

=== College ===
Year	Team	Games		Rushing				Receiving			
Year	Team	GP	GS	Att	Yds	Avg	TD	Rec	Yds	Avg	TD
2016	Utah	10	3	84	382	4.5	2	1	4	4.0	0
2017	Utah	**13**	**12**	214	1,173	5.5	10	**29**	243	8.4	0
2018	Utah	9	9	179	1,096	**6.1**	11	8	50	6.3	1
2019	Utah	**13**	**12**	**235**	**1,416**	6.0	**15**	28	**388**	**13.9**	**2**
Career		45	36	712	4,067	5.7	38	66	685	10.4	3

== Personal life ==
Moss is the cousin of former NFL wide receivers Santana Moss and Sinorice Moss, and a second cousin of defensive back Patrick Peterson.
