= Fotn =

FOTN may refer to:

- Fields of the Nephilim, an English gothic rock band
- Flight of the Navigator, a 1986 American science fiction-comedy film
