= Lawrence Gordon (gridiron football) =

American gridiron football player (born 1984)

No. 19
- Position: Defensive back

Personal information
- Born: March 30, 1984 (age 42); Hallandale Beach, Florida, U.S.
- Listed height: 5 ft 11 in (1.80 m)
- Listed weight: 175 lb (79 kg)

Career information
- High school: Hallandale
- College: Florida Atlantic
- NFL draft: 2006: undrafted

Career history
- 2006–2009: Hamilton Tiger-Cats
- 2010: Edmonton Eskimos
- Stats at CFL.ca (archive)

Lawrence Gordon (born March 30, 1984) is a former professional Canadian football defensive back.
