= John Martino (actor) =

American actor (born 1937)

- Born: May 5, 1937 (age 89); New York City, New York, U.S.
- Occupation: Actor
- Years active: 1968–present

John Martino (born May 5, 1937) is an American actor who was born and raised in Brooklyn, New York. He played the foot-soldier Paulie Gatto in the American crime film The Godfather.

Martino began his acting career in a play titled Hat Full of Rain. He then went on to act in a single episode of the 1960s CBS television show, The Wild Wild West.

== Filmography ==
=== Film ===
Year	Title	Role	Notes
1968	How Sweet It Is!	Bartender	Uncredited
1970	The Grasshopper	Lover	Uncredited
1972	The Godfather	Paulie Gatto	
1973	Dillinger	Eddie Martin	
1974	Truck Stop Women	Smith	
1975	Capone	Tony Amatto	
1998	The Right Way	Sal	
2004	Flowers	Freddie Felton	
2005	Confessions of a Thug	Vic Torino	
2008	The Price	Mr. Caputo	
2012	The Corpse Grinders 3	Mr. Gualtieri	
2012	Dead by Friday	Salvatore	

=== Television ===
Year	Show	Role	Notes
1968	The Wild Wild West	Jose	One episode, The Night of the Headless Woman
