= Dark State (film) =

- Poster
- Directed by: Tracy Lucca
- Written by: Tracy Lucca
- Produced by: Michel Grey; Lynne Lucca; Tracy Lucca; Dino F. Petrongolo; Mark Riccadonna
- Starring: K. O'Rourke; Nicholas Baroudi; Melissa Connell; Constantine Maroulis; Antonio Corone; Katie Stahl
- Music by: Paul Lewis
- Release date: March 19, 2021
- Running time: 93 minutes
- Country: United States
- Language: English

Dark State is a 2021 American mystery crime drama thriller film written and directed by Tracy Lucca. The film stars K. O'Rourke, Nicholas Baroudi, Melissa Connell, Constantine Maroulis, Antonio Corone and Katie Stahl. The film's art director was David Keane. The film had a limited release in the United States on March 19, 2021.

== Cast ==
- K. O'Rourke as Alicia Gazzara
- Nicholas Baroudi as Russell "Rusty"
- Melissa Connell as Lilith
- Constantine Maroulis as Adorno
- Antoni Corone as Joe "Joeboy"
- Katie Stahl
- Terence Gleeson as Hippie

== Reception ==
Alan Ng of Film Threat wrote "Dark State is a film with something interesting to say about the world around us and questions who is really in charge and what a person has to give up or compromise to fulfill that American Dream".

According to Marc Savlov of The Austin Chronicle, "That might be your cup of Bilderbergian-flavored hydroxychloroquine paranoiac politics but I found it to be yet another depressing reminder of how far we've fallen".
