= Joey Cramer =

Canadian actor

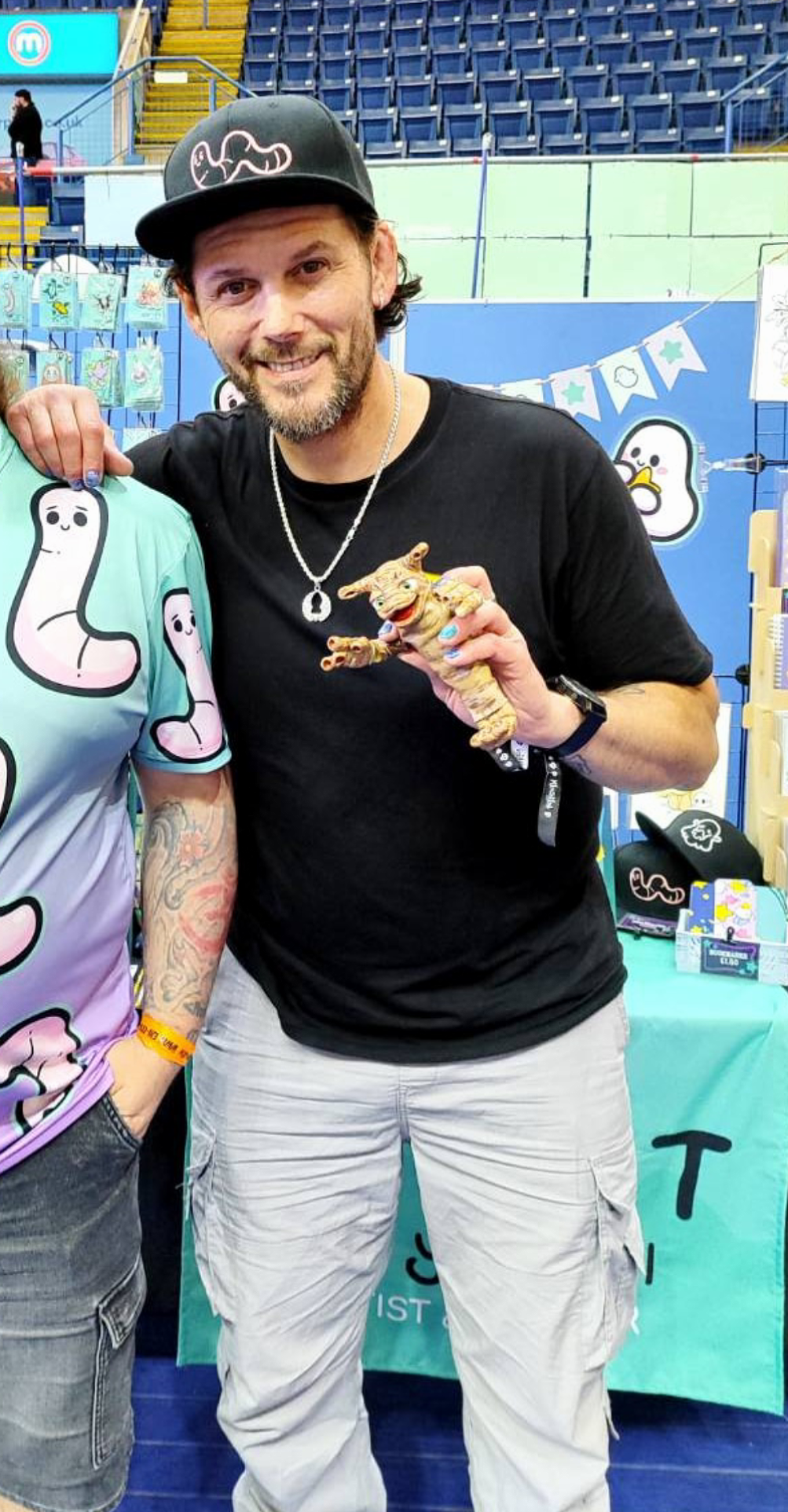
- Cramer in 2024
- Born: Deleriyes Joe August Fisher Cramer; 1973 or 1974 (age 52–53); Vancouver, British Columbia, Canada
- Occupation: Actor
- Years active: 1984–1996; 2018–present
- Website: joeycramer.com

Deleriyes Joe August Fisher Cramer (born 1973 or 1974) is a Canadian actor who had a briefly successful career in Canadian television and Hollywood in the mid-1980s, most notably for his role in the film Flight of the Navigator.

== Biography ==
Cramer was born in Vancouver, British Columbia. His starring performance in 1986's Flight of the Navigator earned him a nomination for a Saturn Award for Best Performance by a Young Actor from the Academy of Science Fiction, Fantasy and Horror Films.

When Cramer's acting career ended in the late 1990s, Cramer returned to Canada's Sunshine Coast, where he worked in a small sporting goods store.

In 2008, he was prosecuted for careless storage of a firearm, and received three months' probation. Later that year, he was convicted for possession of a controlled substance for the purpose of trafficking, and received a prison sentence of six months.

On May 1, 2016, he was arrested in connection with the robbery of Scotiabank in Sechelt, British Columbia a few days earlier. On June 8, 2016, he pleaded guilty to charges of robbing a bank, wearing a disguise to commit a crime, fleeing police, and dangerous driving. On August 31, 2016, he was sentenced to a custodial term of two years less a day, as well as two years of probation, conditions of which included attending counselling and residing in a treatment centre for narcotics abuse.

In 2018, production began on a documentary about Cramer's life, Life After the Navigator. It was released in November 2020 on Blu-ray Disc and select streaming providers.

== Filmography ==
=== Film ===
Year	Title	Role	Notes
1984	Runaway	Bobby Ramsey	
1986	The Clan of the Cave Bear	Young Broud	
1986	Flight of the Navigator	David Freeman	Nominated – Saturn Award for Best Performance by a Younger Actor
1987	Stone Fox	Willy	
1996	It's My Party	Party Guest	Uncredited
2020	Fried Barry	Himself	
2020	Life After the Navigator	Himself	Documentary
2021	End of Discussion	Father	Short film Also writer
2021	Fragile Seeds	Buddy	
2021	Pirette	Chris	Short film
2022	In Search of Tomorrow	Himself	Documentary
2023	Ginny's Enterprise	Radio Broadcaster	Short film
2023	Altered Perceptions	Himself	
2023	PolyGone	Guy	Short film

=== Television ===
Year	Title	Role	Notes
1986	The Magical World of Disney	Eric Wilder	Episode: "I-Man"
1986	Murder, She Wrote	Charlie McCallum	2 episodes
