= Antoni Corone =

American actor and producer

- Born: Willoughby, Ohio, U.S.
- Occupations: Actor, producer

Antoni Corone is an American actor and producer. He is perhaps best known for playing "Frank Urbano" in the American drama television series Oz and "Captain Warren" in The Red Road.

== Early life ==
Corone was born in Willoughby, Ohio.

== Career ==
Corone launched his career in the mid-1980s, usually cast as rugged, slightly-imposing and domineering types, including club bouncers, security personnel, military men, and officers of the law.

In 1986, Corone played in the television film Charley Hannah. In 1991 he guest-starred in the British television sitcom Only Fools and Horses in the episode Miami Twice playing the role of Mafia don's son Rico Ochetti. The episode originally aired on BBC One in the United Kingdom on December 25, 1991.

In 1997, Corone recorded a participation in Kenan & Kel as the movie star "Buck Savage".

Corone's film work includes bit parts in A-list features such as Blood and Wine, Striptease, Bad Boys II, and Out of Time. He had a larger supporting role in the crime saga We Own the Night.

Corone's other work includes the HBO series Oz (as mobster Frank Urbano), Reservation Road, the 2008 film Recount, the war drama Green Zone, the 2014 TV series The Red Road and 11.22.63 (as Jack Ruby). He also appeared in the 1991 film Cape Fear.

== Filmography ==
=== Film ===
Year	Title	Role	Notes
1986	Band of the Hand	Narc #1	
1987	Masterblaster	Leon	
1989	Brenda Starr	Karl	
1991	Cape Fear	Corrections Officer	
1993	Excessive Force	Tommy "Fat Tommy"	
1993	Only the Strong	Green Beret Sergeant	
1994	Ace Ventura: Pet Detective	Reporter #1	
1994	The Specialist	Marksman	
1995	The Low Life	Louis	
1995	The Perez Family	Security	
1995	Fair Game	"Codebreaker"	
1996	Striptease	Nico	
1996	Blood and Wine	Caribbean Club Bartender	
1996	Persons Unknown	Vixen	
1997	Plato's Run	Barnes	
1997	Gone Fishin'	Front Desk Clerk	
1997	Catherine's Grove	Detective Olsen	
1997	Mayday – Flug in den Tod	The Bartender	
1998	Wild Things	Police Chief	
1998	The Truman Show	Security Guard	
1998	Holy Man	Chain Saw Host	
1999	Raging Hormones	Earl Broadhurst	
1999	The Last Marshal	FBI Agent	
1999	Any Given Sunday	Fan	
2000	The Crew	Officer	
2001	In the Shadows	Vito	
2001	Landfall	Officer Matthews	
2002	All About the Benjamins	Captain Briggs	
2002	Big Trouble	William Spaulding	
2002	American Gun	Charles Anderson	
2003	Bad Boys II	DEA Tony Dodd	
2003	Out of Time	Deputy Baste	
2004	The Punisher	T.J.	
2005	Hitters Anonymous	Iverson	
2005	Complete Guide to Guys	The Bartender	
2005	Planet Ibsen	Helmer	
2005	Passing Fancy	Detective Rodriguez	
2006	Find Me Guilty	Hospital Detective	
2006	Chat	Mac	
2007	We Own the Night	Lieutenant Michael Solo	
2007	Reservation Road	Sergeant Burke	
2008	Pistol Whipped	Sharp	
2009	I Love You Phillip Morris	Lindholm	
2010	Green Zone	Colonel Lyons	
2010	Loving the Bad Man	Ed Thompson	
2012	Act of Valor	Yacht Henchman #1	
2013	Eenie Meenie Miney Moe	Ivan	
2013	Sunlight Jr.	Edwin	
2013	The Immigrant	Officer Thomas MacNally	
2013	Assumed Killer	Detective Maurer	
2014	Percentage	Anatoly	
2014	Need for Speed	Detective #2	
2014	Evil Dark	Hugh Goldman	
2014	Patient Killer	Detective Cameron	
2015	Hidden Assets	Lieutenant Brown	
2015	Tony Tango	Sam "Machete Sam"	
2016	Below the Surface	Garbaccio	
2016	Everglades	Geo	
2017	Ned Venture	Sal	
2017	Crocodylus	Chase	
2018	The Little Mermaid	Mr. Coleman	
2018	Belleville Cop	Contremaître	
2019	Fatal Getaway	Officer Martin	
2020	Pregnant and Alone	Motel Manager	
2020	Brothers by Blood	Bono	
2020	American Lions	Hobbes	
2021	Dark State	Joe "Joeboy"	
2021	Apollyon – The Black Awakening	Father Michael	
2022	Isle of Hope	Dr. Garrison	

=== Television ===
Year	Title	Role	Notes
1985–1988	Miami Vice	Various Roles	4 episodes
1986	Intimate Strangers	Sergeant Ellis	Television film
1986	Charley Hannah	Marco	Television film
1986	Vengeance: The Story of Tony Cimo	Detective Bud Causey	Television film
1987	High Mountain Rangers	Danny "Peanuts" Fiore	Episode: "Pilot"
1988–1990	Superboy	Ben / Commanding Cop / Jake	3 episodes
1989	B.L. Stryker	Chet Rinker	Episode: "Auntie Sue"
1990	The Love Boat: A Valentine Voyage	The Fence	Television film
1990	Somebody Has to Shoot the Picture	Mike Knighton, D.A.'s Assistant	Television film
1990–1992	Super Force	Captain Avery Merkel	11 episodes
1991	Murder 101	Mike Dowling	Television film
1991	Red Wind	Bo	Television film
1991	Only Fools and Horses	Riccardo "Rico" Occhetti	Episode: "Miami Twice"
1992	Swamp Thing	Alonso	Episode: "This Old House of Mayan"
1993	Staying Afloat	Carlos	Television film
1994	Fortune Hunter	Ironside	Episode: "The Frostfire Intercept"
1995	Crosstown Traffic	Sergeant Barnes	Television film
1996	Hello, She Lied	Club Patron	Television film
1996	Pier 66	Burly Man	Television film
1997	Walker, Texas Ranger	Sid Jarvis	Episode: "The Fighting McLains"
1997	Kenan & Kel	Buck Savage	Episode: "A Star Is Peeved"
1997	Assault on Devil's Island	Gallindo's Lawyer	Television film
1998	Creature	Exec	2 episodes
1998	Logan's War: Bound by Honor	Mike Faffino	Television film
2000	Falcone	Carlo Volonte	Episode: "Pilot"
2000	The Fugitive	Steve Beech	Episode: "Pilot"
2001	Sheena	Armstrong	Episode: "Children of the LaMistas"
2001–2003	All My Children	Flanders / Evan	6 episodes
2002–2003	Oz	Frank Urbano	9 episodes
2002–2003	Ocean Ave.	Roberto Rendon	44 episodes
2007	Burn Notice	Mason	Episode: "Unpaid Debts"
2008	Recount	Tom Feeney	Television film
2013	Graceland	Max	Episode: "Heat Run"
2014–2015	The Red Road	Captain Warren	8 episodes
2015	Instant Gratification	Frank Galdo	Television film
2015	South Beach	Juan's Bodyguard	6 episodes
2016	11.22.63	Jack Ruby	Episode: "Other Voices, Other Rooms"
2016	The MobKing	Billotti	Television film
2016	Ballers	Dr. Frey	2 episodes
2017	Bloodline	Eddie Derlago	Episode: "Part 29"
2018	Daredevil	Commissioner Chris DiMolina	Episode: "Please"
2018	Escape at Dannemora	Scary Gary / Commissary Clerk	3 episodes
2019	Wu-Tang: An American Saga	Patxi	3 episodes
2020	For Life	Police Commissioner	Episode: "Pilot"
2020	The Charm of Love	The Mayor	Television film
