= Davin Joseph =

American football player (born 1983)

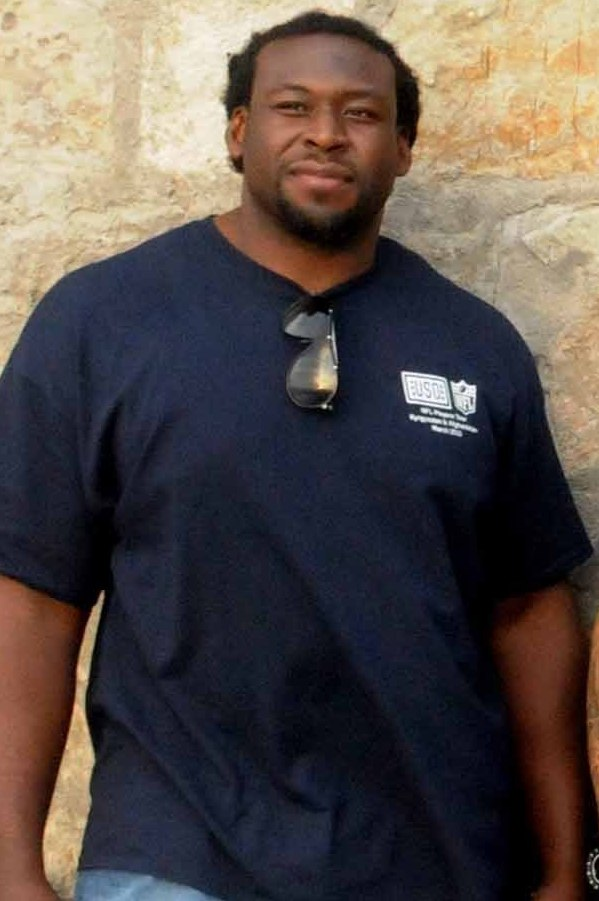
- Joseph on a United Service Organizations tour in Afghanistan in 2013

No. 69, 75
- Position: Offensive guard

Personal information
- Born: November 22, 1983 (age 42); Hallandale Beach, Florida, U.S.
- Listed height: 6 ft 3 in (1.91 m)
- Listed weight: 313 lb (142 kg)

Career information
- High school: Hallandale (Hallandale Beach)
- College: Oklahoma (2002–2005)
- NFL draft: 2006: 1st round, 23rd overall pick

Career history
- Tampa Bay Buccaneers (2006–2013); St. Louis Rams (2014)

Awards and highlights
- 2× Pro Bowl (2008, 2011); First-team All-Big 12 (2005); Second-team All-Big 12 (2004)

Career NFL statistics
- Games played: 116
- Games started: 112
- Stats at Pro Football Reference

Davin Joseph (born November 22, 1983) is an American former professional football player who was a guard in the National Football League (NFL). He played college football for the Oklahoma Sooners, and was selected by the Tampa Bay Buccaneers in the first round of the 2006 NFL draft with the 23rd overall pick. A two-time Pro Bowler, Joseph also played for the St. Louis Rams.

== Early life ==
Joseph was born in Hallandale Beach, Florida, and is of Haitian descent. He played high school football at Hallandale High School. While there he was a four-year starter at both guard and defensive line and played in a school-record 532 plays. During his senior year, he was the Broward County Defensive Player of the Year and was awarded All-State after recording 100 tackles and 24 sacks. He was also a two-time 2A state and a national wrestling champion at heavyweight in Florida.

== College career ==
Joseph played college football at Oklahoma. During his freshman year, he was named Freshman All-Big 12 by The Sporting News. As a senior, he was a consensus First-team All-Big 12 selection. He finished his career playing in 50 games with 29 starts at guard and 11 starts at left tackle.

== Professional career ==
Pre-draft measurables
Height	Weight	Arm length	Hand span	40-yard dash	10-yard split	20-yard split	20-yard shuttle	Three-cone drill	Vertical jump	Broad jump	Bench press
6 ft 2 5/8 in (1.90 m)	311 lb (141 kg)	35 1/8 in (0.89 m)	11 1/4 in (0.29 m)	5.14 s	1.76 s	2.97 s	4.73 s	7.74 s	32.0 in (0.81 m)	9 ft 3 in (2.82 m)	24 reps
All values from NFL Combine/Pro Day

=== Tampa Bay Buccaneers ===
Joseph was drafted by the Tampa Bay Buccaneers in the first round with the 23rd overall pick in the 2006 NFL draft. During his rookie season, he started 12 of 13 games at right guard. In his second season in the NFL he became a full-time starter, starting all 16 games at right guard for the Buccaneers. He was selected to his first Pro Bowl after the 2008 season as a substitute. On July 28, 2011, Joseph and the team agreed on a seven-year, $53 million contract, $19 million of which was guaranteed. He was selected to his second Pro Bowl during the 2011 season.

In the third preseason game against the New England Patriots in 2012, Joseph hurt his knee when teammate Donald Penn blocked defensive end Chandler Jones into his knee. Joseph was later placed on injured reserve, ending his season.

Joseph was released by Tampa Bay on March 8, 2014.

=== St. Louis Rams ===
Joseph signed with the St. Louis Rams on May 28, 2014.

== Philanthropy ==
In 2011, Davin Joseph established the Davin Joseph Foundation, a 501(c)(3) organization devoted to enhancing the athletic and performing arts programs in three Title-One public schools in Tampa and Hallandale, Florida, respectively.

== Awards ==
Davin Joseph has won several awards such as:

- 2015 Rainbow Push Community Service Award
- Induction in the Broward County Athletic Association Wrestling Hall of Fame (2013)
- Byron "Whizzer" White Award (2012)
- City of Hallandale Beach, Florida, and its mayor proclaimed July 12–14 forever recognized as Davin Joseph Football Week (2012)
- Featuring on Fox13, Tampa's local news station for "What's Good in Tampa Bay?" segment (2012)
- Cover story in Focus Magazine, recognizing his commitment to the community of Tampa, Florida (2011)
