= Life After the Navigator =

Documentary

Life After the Navigator is a 2020 documentary about child actor Joey Cramer's journey after starring in the 1986 Disney movie Flight of the Navigator. It chronicles Cramer's post-teenage and adult life after starring in the movie to a life of homelessness and crime to his eventual successful rehabilitation. It was released by Life After Movies, as part of a Life After series of nostalgic feature documentaries directed by Lisa Downs, produced by Downs and Ashley Pugh that documents movie actors from other notable movies such as The Neverending Story and The Goonies.

Life After the Navigator spent 3 years in production, with Lisa Downs initially reaching out to Cramer via mail during his incarceration at Nanaimo Correctional Centre. Also interviewed for the documentary are Flight of the Navigator director Randal Kleiser, Howard Hesseman, Veronica Cartwright, Cliff De Young, Matt Adler, and puppeteers Tim Blaney and Tony Urbano.
