= Whoops Apocalypse (film) =

- UK DVD cover
- Directed by: Tom Bussmann
- Written by: Andrew Marshall & David Renwick
- Produced by: Brian Eastman
- Starring: Loretta Swit; Herbert Lom; Peter Cook
- Distributed by: ITC Entertainment
- Release dates: 1986 (UK); 1988 (US)
- Running time: 93 min
- Country: United Kingdom
- Language: English

Whoops Apocalypse is a 1986 British comedy film directed by Tom Bussmann and starring Loretta Swit, Herbert Lom, and Peter Cook. The film shares the same title as the TV series Whoops Apocalypse, but uses an almost completely different plot from the series.

== Plot ==
A small British colony is invaded by its neighbour, the country of Maguadora, under dictator General Mosquera. As President of the United States Barbara Adams attempts to assist, the peace talks are sabotaged by the world's leading terrorist, Lacrobat. Conservative British Prime Minister Sir Mortimer Chris sends a task force to recapture the islands. Mosquera hires Lacrobat to kidnap British Princess Wendy, holding her ransom for British withdrawal. Sir Mortimer threatens a nuclear strike unless she is returned within 48 hours. President Adams not only has to deal with Mosquera and Lacrobat, but also Sir Mortimer, and with the fact that Mosquera aligns himself with Russia, and the whole thing could start World War III.

Barbara Adams, the first female U.S. president, only took office when the previous president, a former circus clown, died after asking a journalist to hit him in the stomach with a crowbar as a test of physical strength. Adams is incompetent, especially when dealing with the press. Her husband's weapons company hired Lacrobat to start the war in the first place.

Sir Mortimer claims unemployment is caused by evil invisible pixies. He hands out Union Flag umbrellas to Conservative voters to protect them from nuclear bombs, and plans to reduce unemployment by pushing employed people off cliffs. Despite his obvious insanity, the public adore him and follow him blindly. He loses his hand in a failed attempt by his own party to assassinate him and replaces it with a hook, and adopts a policy of crucifying disloyal party members in Wembley Stadium.

Lacrobat places Princess Wendy in increasingly odd disguises, including a King Kong outfit. When she is disguised as an exhibit in a wax museum, an inept SAS squad attempting a rescue is massacred in a shootout. Lacrobat is partly responsible for the outbreak of war between the two countries; he dies when a tiger kept by the SAS rips his throat out. A Soviet soldier is hiding nuclear weapons on a Caribbean holiday island.

Two tabloid journalists who discover the Communist weapons are killed.

Although Wendy is rescued, Sir Mortimer ignores Adams's pleas to call off the nuclear strike. She calls a rear admiral, who was previously hypnotised to believe he was in a burning building when fingers are snapped. He ponders calling off the strike, but when a sailor snaps his fingers, he calls "Fire!" and the strike is launched.

== Cast ==
In Credits order:

- Stuart Saunders as Governor of Santa Maya
- Graeme Garden as Man Who Walks to the Phone
- Marc Smith as Dan Hickey (TV anchorman)
- Loretta Swit as President Barbara Adams
- John Benfield as Secret Service Agent
- Ben Robertson as Secret Service Agent
- Peter Cook as Sir Mortimer Chris
- Anthony Correa as Convict
- Alex Davion as Maguadoran General
- Herbert Lom as Gen. Mosquera
- Daniel Benzali as William Kubert (U.S. Defence Secretary)
- Phil Marquis as Rock Pit Guard
- Murray Hamilton as Jack 'Kill the Commies' Preston (former President)
- Shane Rimmer as Marvin Gelber (U.S. Secretary of State)
- Robert Arden as White House Reporter
- Blain Fairman as White House Reporter
- Christopher Muncke as White House Reporter
- Michael Richards as Lacrobat
- Dan Fitzgerald as Foyer Guard
- Richard Wilson as Nigel Lipman (Foreign Secretary)
- D.L. Blakely as Window Cleaner
- Raymond Forchion as Conference Guard
- John Sessions as Mr. Sweetzer
- Richard Pearson as Michael Sumpter (Defence Secretary)
- Tristram Jellinek as Dickie
- Ian Richardson as RAdm. Bendish
- Christopher Coll as Flag Lt. Gerald Beaverstone
- Christopher Malcom as Gallagher
- Ian McNeice as Thrush
- Maria Whittaker as Pin-up Girl
- Karen Kelly as Pin-Up Girl
- T.R. Durphy as Student Protester
- Don Wellington as Student Protester
- Joy Lynn Frasca as Cute Little Girl
- Joanne Pearce as Princess Wendy
- Simon Dormandy as Soldier Parted From His Loved Ones
- Paul Beech as Doctor
- Nick Copping as Teapot Stirrer
- Ken Jones as Man On-Off Cliff
- John Cassady as Virgil Grodd (American Intelligence)
- Alexei Sayle as Alexei Sayle in a Hawaiian Shirt
- Manolo Congo as Granny Buyer
- Ruben Rabasa as Granny Vendor
- Robert Blythe as Guard with Egg in Mouth
- Christine Peak as Topless Dancer
- Suzanne Mitzi as Topless Dancer
- Terry Taplin as Ed Rosario
- Mickey O'Donoughue as Hypnotised Serviceman (Chicken)
- John Darrell as Hypnotised Serviceman (Stripper)
- Ron Webster as Soldier at Concert
- Gary Martin as Purveyor of Rambograms
- Clifton James as Maxton S. Pluck
- Czeslaw Grocholski as President Trezhnikov
- Leon Lissek as Politburo Member
- Michel Poole as Politburo Member
- Christopher Rozycki as Russian Doctor
- Ed Bishop as Wink Persiman (TV interviewer)
- John Archie as U.S. Sailor
- Robert Goodman as U.S. Sailor
- Harold Bergman as Desk Clerk
- Iris Acker as Woman in Boarding House
- Richard Murdoch as Cabinet Minister
- Babara Keough as Woman at Wax Museum
- Elizabeth Proud as Woman at Wax Museum
- Rik Mayall as Specialist Catering Commander
- Gavin Richards as Donald
- John Blundell as Douglas
- Daniel Peacock as Dominic
- Robert Bathurst as Damien
- Ellen Kennedy as Dancer
- Sharon Boyce as Dancer
- Emma Bryant as Dancer
- Lorraine Doyle as Dancer
- Jenny Drummond as Dancer
- Wendy Millward as Dancer
- Tracy Smith as Dancer
- Laura Wynne as Dancer

== Reception ==
The Observer wrote "much of the first half is extremely funny... after that the film loses its head of steam."

== See also ==
- List of films based on British sitcoms
- List of fictional prime ministers of the United Kingdom
