= Raymond Forchion =

American actor

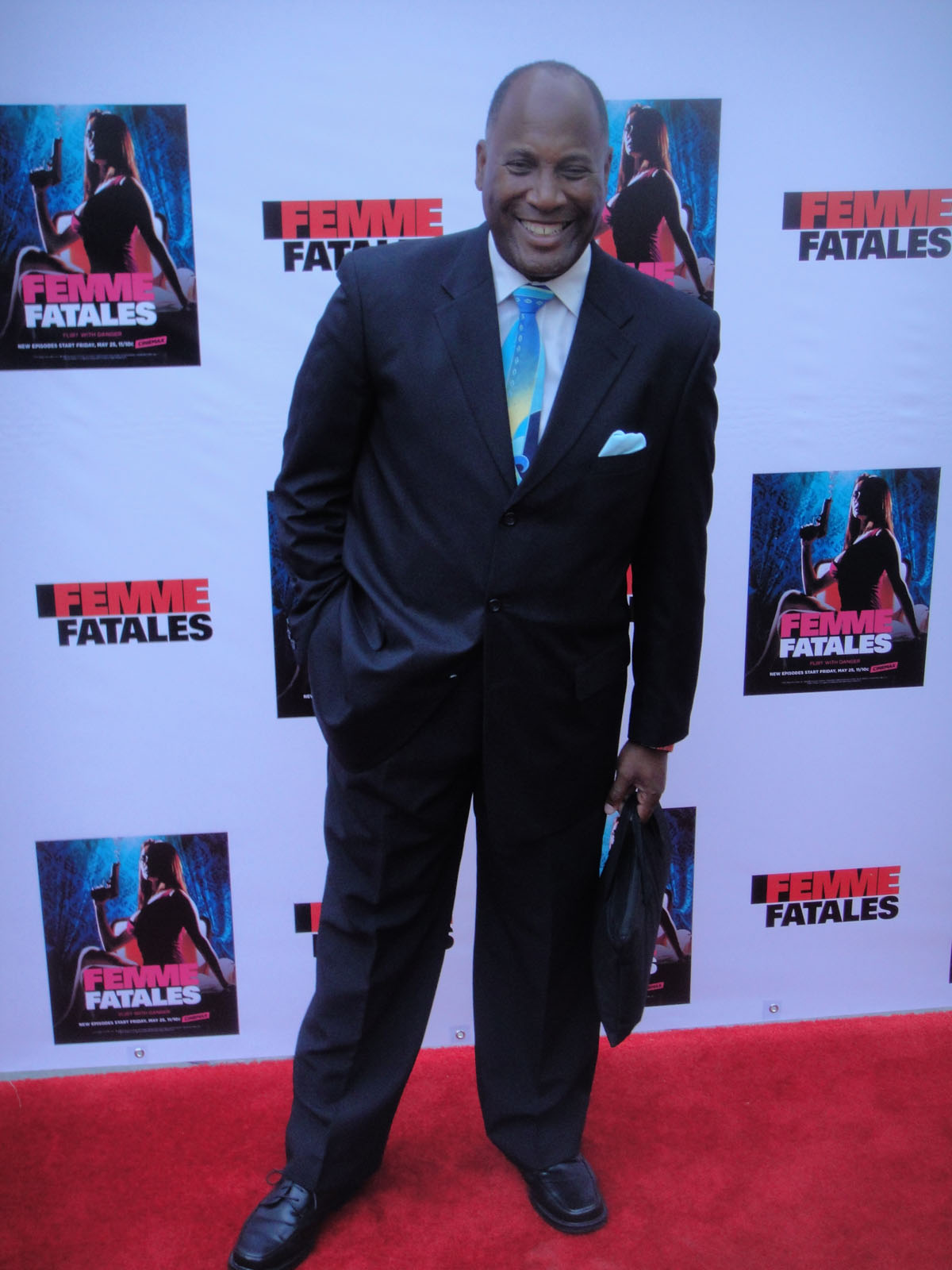
- Raymond Forchion
- Born: Moorestown Township, New Jersey, U.S.
- Occupations: Actor, writer, producer, director
- Years active: 1977–present

Raymond Forchion (/ˈfɔːrʃən/ FOR-shən) is an American actor, writer, producer, and director who has appeared on film, television and stage. Aside from several pilots and TV movies, he has appeared on television series such as Burn Notice, Numb3rs, Star Trek: The Next Generation, Femme Fatales, Southland, Will & Grace, The Golden Girls, Wiseguy and In the Heat of the Night. He has had recurring roles on General Hospital and Miami Vice. His film credits include Flight of the Navigator (1986), Masterblaster (1987) and Point Break (1991).

Forchion has appeared in nearly 100 commercials. He also played O.J. Simpson in CBS miniseries American Tragedy and co-starred in HBO's Emmy-winning movie about the 2000 election Recount, with Kevin Spacey, Tom Wilkinson, Ed Begley Jr., and Laura Dern.

In 2007, Forchion produced Confessions of a Thug, a hip-hop musical film starring Daron Fordham, in which an educated street hustler re-examines his life. It won Best Direction from the San Diego Black Film Festival and was an official selection of the Urbanworld/Vibe Film Festival in New York. In 1992, he was a producer of Last Breeze of Summer, which was made at the American Film Institute and garnered an Oscar nomination for Best Live Action Short. The Horrible Dr. Bones, from Forchion's original screenplay, is available in stores now from Full Moon Releasing.

Forchion is a recipient of the 1999 Team Player Award from the Black Hollywood Education Resource Center, a lifetime achievement for service to the film industry.

== Personal life ==
Forchion was born in Mount Holly Township, New Jersey, and raised in Moorestown Township, New Jersey. Later, he moved to Miami, Florida, and currently resides in Los Angeles, California.

== Filmography ==
Film
Year	Title	Role	Notes
1979	Hot Stuff	Holdup Man #1	
1980	The Pilot	Advertising Personnel	
1980	Island Claws	Jean	
1981	The Funhouse	Man in Tent Show	Uncredited
1981	Nobody's Perfekt	Army Officer	
1981	Freddie of the Jungle	African Warrior	Uncredited
1983	Cat and Dog	Angry Man	Uncredited
1983	Blue Skies Again	Jimmy	
1983	Smokey and the Bandit Part 3	Tar Worker	
1985	The Mean Season	Newsroom Reporter	Uncredited
1985	Private Resort	Bartender	
1986	Flight of the Navigator	Detective Banks	
1986	Whoops Apocalypse	Conference Guard	
1987	Masterblaster	Lincoln Shakir	
1987	Revenge of the Nerds II	Policeman	
1988	Mac and Me	Police Officer #1	
1991	Point Break	Neighbor	
1991	True Identity	Burly Cop	
2001	No Turning Back	Hospital Cop	
2002	Are You a Serial Killer?	Juice	Short
2005	Confessions of a Thug	Himself	Also producer
2013	Island Songs	Detective	Short
2013	Pastor Shirley	Mr. Titan	
2014	Last Writes	Doctor	Short
2016	Neron	Moll	
2017	Destruction Los Angeles	Fire Marshall	
2018	Lost Fare	Gardener	
2019	Faith, Hope and Love	City Worker Joe	
2021	Wizardream	N/A	

Television
Year	Title	Role	Notes
1977	The African Queen	African Villager	TV movie, uncredited
1979	Jennifer's Journey	Street Guy	1 episode
1980	Angel City	Migrant Worker	TV movie
1980	The Wild and the Free	Habibu	TV movie
1980	¿Qué pasa, U.S.A.?	Mike Donahue	Episode: "There Goes the Neighborhood"
1983	Feel the Heat	Detective	Pilot
1984–1986	Miami Vice	Don/ O'Hara	4 episodes
1986	Intimate Strangers	Corey Wells	TV movie
1986	Charley Hannah	N/A	TV movie
1987	Wiseguy	Cecil Demont	Episode :"Loose Cannon"
1988	Bustin' Loose	Cop	1 episode
1988	Moonlighting	Crime Scene Cop	Episode :"And the Flesh Was Made Word"
1988	Star Trek: The Next Generation	Lt. Ben Prieto	Episode: "Skin of Evil"
1988	Hemmingway	Willard	4 episodes
1991	In the Heat of the Night	Wallace Fannoy	Episode :"Just A Country Boy"
1991	Bad Attitudes	Cohn	TV movie
1991	Us	Warden Turner	TV movie
1992	The Golden Girls	Professor Bradley	Episode :"Question and Answers"
1994	Smart Kids	Dad	TV movie
1994	In a Split Second	Father	TV movie
1995–1996	Ellen	Smitty / Customer #2	2 episodes
1999	City Guys	Mr. Washington	Episode :"Alley Oops"
2000	American Tragedy	O.J Simpson	TV movie
2000	Will & Grace	Clayton	Episode :"Low in the Mid-Eighties"
2008	Recount	Jeff Robinson	TV movie
2008	General Hospital	Coast Guard Officer	Episode #1.11681
2010	Numb3rs	Wayne Petersen	Episode: "Scratch"
2012	Southland	Carter	Episode: "Community"
2012	Burn Notice	Butch McCall	Episode: "Split Decision"
2012	Femme Fatales	Judge Aldrich	Episode: "Hell Hath No Furies"
2013	Grey's Anatomy	Minister	Episode: "Things We Said Today"
2014	Taylor'd Problems	Mr. Johnson	Episode: "Guess Who's Coming for Dinner ?"
2014	Franklin & Bash	Male Board Member #5	Episode: "Falcon's Nest"
2014	Scandal	Judge Lancaster	Episode: "An Innocent Man"
2015	Shameless	Minister	Episode: "I'm the Liver"
2015	The Adversaries	Judge Haywood Dempsey	TV movie
2016	2 Lava 2 Lantula !	Hal	TV movie
2016	Fresh Off the Boat	Ted	2 episodes
2017	Insecure	Uncle Jesse	Episode: "Hella Open"
2018	Goliath	Mayor Peter Anderson	Episode: "Who's Gabriel"
2018	Snowfall	Rushed Customer	Episode: "Serpiente"
2018	Into the Dark	Hank	Episode: "The Body"
2018	Almost Perfect	Detective George	TV movie
2018	Station 19	Minister	Episode: "Last Day on Earth"
2019	S.W.A.T	Marcus	Episode: "Funny Money"
2019	Good Trouble	Pastor Thurston	2 episodes
2020	Better Things	Settlement Officer	Episode: "Father's Day"
2021	A Christmas Family Reunion	Terrence	TV movie
2023	Legacy	Tommy	Episode: "Afternath"
