= Masterblaster (film) =

American action film

- Directed by: Glenn R. Wilder
- Screenplay by: Randy Grinter; Glenn R. Wilder; Jeff Moldovan
- Story by: Randy Grinter
- Produced by: Randy Grinter
- Starring: Jeff Moldovan; Donna Rosea
- Cinematography: Frank P. Flynn
- Edited by: Steve Cuiffo; Angelo Ross
- Music by: Alain Salvati
- Production company: First American Entertainment
- Distributed by: Overseas FilmGroup
- Release date: May 22, 1987
- Running time: 80 minutes
- Country: United States
- Language: English

Masterblaster is a 1987 action thriller film directed by Glenn R. Wilder. The film stars Jeff Moldovan and Donna Rosea.

== Cast ==
- Jeff Moldovan as Jeremy Hawk
- Donna Rosea as Samantha Rosen
- Joe Hess as De Angelo
- Robert Goodman as Mike
- Richard St. George as Monk
- Jorge Gil as "Snake"
- Pete Lundblad as Lewis
- Earleen Carey as Laura
- R.J. Reynolds as Jimmy Roy
- Julian Byrd as Gary Lee
- Ron Burgs as Bobby Jo
- Tracy Hutchinson as Lisa
- Bill Wohrman as Brad
- Raymond Forchion as Lincoln Shakir
- Yoshimitsu Yamada as Yamada
- Antoni Corone as Leon
- Big Mike Tiederberg as Gunther
- Lou Ann Carroll as Vicki
- Kari Whitman as Jennifer
- Tom Law as Ish
- Tony Pitt as Tony
- D.L. Blakely as Joe "JoJo"
- Timothy Hawkins as Dwayne Starke Attorney & Ex-Quarterback
