= Bryan Lugo =

American actor

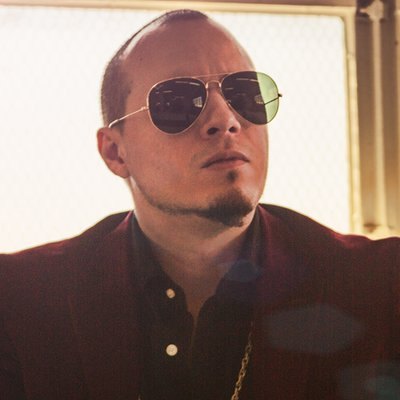
- Lugo on set
- Born: Bryan Alexis Lugo; August 7, 1982 (age 43); New York City, U.S.
- Occupations: Actor, director
- Years active: 2005–present
- Spouse: Cheryl Lugo

Bryan Lugo (born August 7, 1982) is a Dominican-American actor & director. His most recognizable role may be in The CW series Supergirl as Looter and as Ross the hitman in his recurring role on the Epix series Get Shorty.

== Career ==
Bryan Lugo played Officer Burton in the IFC Films and La Petite Reine film Maniac. The film premiered at the 2012 Cannes Film Festival, out of competition. Lugo plays opposite Elijah Wood in the film, which premiered to a limited distribution in theaters on January 2, 2013. His other films include Afternoon Delight, which premiered in the 2013 Sundance Film Festival, opposite Kathryn Hahn, Jane Lynch, and Juno Temple; I Am Gangster (2015); and Marvel Studios' Ant-Man and the Wasp, opposite Tip "T.I." Harris, David Dastmalchian, and Walton Goggins, which premiered on July 6, 2018, worldwide in theaters.

== Filmography ==
Film roles
Year	Title	Role
2005	The Essence of Irwin	Joe
2005	Confessions of a Thug	Carlos
2005	Grub	Fish
2007	Real Premonition	Joey Battaglia
2012	Maniac	Officer Burton
2013	Afternoon Delight	Tow Truck Driver
2014	Conflicted	Chris
2015	I Am Gangster	Huerta
2016	Game of Chance	Christo
2017	Clandestine Dynasty	Chavez
2018	Ant-Man and the Wasp	Wharf Cop

Television roles
Year	Title	Role	Notes
2005	Sekai Gyoten News	Co-Worker	Episode: "Food Service Fugitive"
2005	Dr. G: Medical Examiner	Tomas Morales	Episode: "Ashes to Ashes"
2007	Ned's Declassified School Survival Guide	Zemo Posse	Episode: "Tests and When You Like Someone Who Is Seeing Someone Else"
2010	Dexter	Young Man	Episode: "Beauty and the Beast"
2010	The Mentalist	Rusty Moore	Episode: "Red Moon"
2012	Heroic Daze	The Redd Robbyn	Main Cast
2012	Eagleheart	Lee	Episode: "Beat Shack"
2013	NCIS	Navy Petty Officer Third Class Bruce Smith	Episode: "Shabbat Shalom"
2015	Bosch	Worker	Episode: "Chapter Six: Donkey's Years"
2015	Supergirl	Looter	Episode: "Human for a Day"
2016	Joy	Dr. Foster	Episode: "The Skateboarding Competition"
2016	Scandal	Guard	Episode: "Till Death Do Us Part"
2017	Do You Want to See a Dead Body?	Prison MC	Episode: "A Body and a Bust"
2017	Foursome	Sev Donald Zas	Episode: "Beach Bash-ed"
2017-2018	Get Shorty	Ross	Recurring
2019	S.W.A.T.	Elvin	Episode: "Invisible"
