= Hallandale High School =

Public high school in Hallandale Beach, Florida, United States

Hallandale Magnet High School

Location
- 720 NW 9th Avenue, Hallandale Beach, FL 33009; 25.9939799°N 80.161435°W

Information
- Type: Public
- Motto: "Catch the Vision"
- School district: Broward County Public Schools
- Superintendent: Dr. Peter B. Licata
- Teaching staff: 50.00 (FTE)
- Grades: 9–12
- Enrollment: 1,031 (2024–2025)
- Student to teacher ratio: 20.62
- Colors: Maroon; Gold; White
- Team name: Chargers
- Newspaper: The Plug
- Website: hallandalehigh.browardschools.com

Hallandale Magnet High School is a public high school and magnet school located in Hallandale Beach, Florida. The school is a part of the Broward County Public Schools district and was established in 1973. It serves Hallandale Beach, Pembroke Park, and West Park.

== History ==
In the early 1970s, Hallandale High School was temporarily housed in the former Lanier Junior High School building in Hallandale Beach, which had served Black students during segregation. The school moved after its current facility was completed in the mid-1970s.

== Admissions ==
=== Demographics ===
As of the 2021–22 school year, the total student enrollment was 1,084. The ethnic makeup of the school was 32.9% White, 63.1% Black, 31.5% Hispanic, 0.5% Asian, 0.3% Pacific Islander, 3% Multiracial, and 0.2% Native American or Native Alaskan.

== Curriculum ==
Hallandale High is an All Magnet High School. The magnet programs are broken down into three houses, the two major being Communications and International Affairs, alongside the smaller Urban Teacher Academy.

== Extracurricular activities ==
=== Student media ===
- The Lightning Times is the official student newspaper of Hallandale High School. The Lightning Times is published monthly on a print edition and is updated regularly on their student run website.
- HDTV News which is run by students with the help of faculty.

== Notable alumni ==
- Lawrence Gordon, former CFL defensive back
- Frankie Hammond, former NFL wide receiver
- Tabarie Henry, 2x Olympic sprinter
- Tyler Huntley, NFL quarterback
- Davin Joseph, former NFL offensive lineman
- Zack Moss, NFL running back
- Sydelle Noel, actress/model
- Butch Rolle, former NFL tight end
- Nancy Valen, actress Bay Watch

== Former principals ==
- In 1996 Moses Barnes was to become principal of Hallandale; he was previously at Lauderhill Middle School.
- The current principal is Paula Peters.
