= Confessions of a Thug (film) =

- Directed by: Daron Fordham
- Written by: Daron Fordham
- Produced by: Raymond Forchion; Daron Fordham
- Starring: Ben Affan; Karina Bonnefil
- Cinematography: Ben Mesker; Luis Rodriguez
- Edited by: John Grilli
- Music by: Flavio Motalla
- Production company: South Boy Films
- Distributed by: Warner Home Video; Polychrome Pictures
- Release date: 2005
- Running time: 105 minutes
- Country: USA
- Language: English

Confessions of a Thug is a 2005 American rap "hip hop" opera film. It is directed by Daron Fordham and is the film debut performance for Lady of Rage.

== Synopsis ==
The film is the story of South Boy (Daron Fordham). He learns about the criminal underworld from his mentor a retired mob boss (John Martino), who is also the closest thing to a father figure he has known. Determined to find the family he never knew and become a feared and respected gang-lord, he must deal with snitches, government agents and scheming associates through his drug deals, relationships, and life in general. South Boy gets pulled in deep in this inner city exploitation on urban gangs and he is on a journey to reclaim what is rightfully his and to also set everything right.

== Cast ==
- Ben Affan - Miguel
- Karina Bonnefil - Quadra
- Victoria Bowers -
- Ashley Buckhalter -
- Georgia Chris - Lisa
- John Early - Morgan
- Kenny Flyy - Roscoe
- Raymond Forchion - Himself - Producer Commentary
- Daron Fordham - South Boy
- Khris Gibston - Flamboyant Gay Inmate
- John Hill - FBI Agent #2
- Lanre Idewu - Risk
- Valerie Jones - Caberra
- Kristia Knowles - Mother
- Shealyn Taylor - Little Girl
- The Lady of Rage -
- Leslie Lormann - Federal Agent
- Bryan Lugo - Carlos
- Vinicius Machado - Hector
- Aaliyah Madyun - Yayla
- J. Martino -
- John Martino - Vic Torino
- Sandra Milliner - Rosie
- J.T. Money -
- Wiley B. Oscar - Lonnie
- Michael A. Quill - Warden Chambers
- John G. Rice Jr. - F.B.I. Agent #3
- Amy Simon - Ms. Stanton
- Alvetta Smith - Skyy
- Angel Tyree -
- Lithia Velasquez - Vic's Nurse
- Vincent Ward - Mr. Redd Dog
- Brewier Welch - FBI Agent #1

== Production ==
While the film is shot with a lower budget, it pulls off some realistic story lines, as well as the creative elements of the movie when the characters spontaneously burst into Hip-Hop song, expressing the inner thoughts of the characters through rap. The movie was shot in mostly in Florida, Georgia and the Bahamas, and was picked up by Polychrome Pictures and Warner Brothers. The production dates began on 1 September 2003. The working title was Fed Time.

== Awards ==
Directed by Daron Fordham and produced by Raymond Forchion, the movie won Fordham the Best Direction award at the San Diego Black Film Festival and was also screened as an Official Selection of the URBANWORLD/VIBE Film Festival in New York. In 2006, the film also won two Crystal Reels at the Crystal Reel Awards, one for John Martino in the category of Best Actor, and the other also for Martino for Best Actor in a Feature Film.
