= Randal Kleiser =

American filmmaker (born 1946)

- Kleiser in 2026
- Born: John Randal Kleiser; July 20, 1946 (age 80); Lebanon, Pennsylvania, U.S.
- Education: University of Southern California
- Occupations: Film director; producer; screenwriter; actor
- Years active: 1962–present

John Randal Kleiser (born July 20, 1946) is an American film and television director, producer, screenwriter and actor. He is best known for directing the films Grease (1978), The Blue Lagoon (1980), Flight of the Navigator (1986) and White Fang (1991).

== Biography ==
John Randal Kleiser was born in Lebanon, Pennsylvania, the son of Harriet Kelly (née Means) and Dr. John Raymond Kleiser. He has two younger brothers. Kleiser attended Conestoga High School on the Philadelphia Main Line.

As a freshman at the University of Southern California, he appeared in George Lucas' student film Freiheit. (Kleiser also lived in the house that Lucas was renting at the time.) Kleiser graduated in 1968. His award-winning Master's thesis film, the 1973 short Peege about a grandson's bond with his ailing grandmother, launched his career and was selected for preservation by the United States Library of Congress National Film Registry in 2007. He also directed an animated short that year called Foot Fetish (which was later aired on Saturday Night Live a decade later).

Kleiser directed several television movies in the mid-1970s, including Dawn: Portrait of a Teenage Runaway (1975), The Boy in the Plastic Bubble (1976), which starred John Travolta, and the Emmy Award-winning The Gathering (1977). Kleiser was tapped to direct his first feature film, the 1978 film Grease, in large part because of Travolta's recommendation based on their work together on The Boy in the Plastic Bubble.

Kleiser directed several more feature films, including The Blue Lagoon (1980) with Brooke Shields, Summer Lovers (1982) with Daryl Hannah, Grandview, U.S.A. (1984) with Jamie Lee Curtis, Flight of the Navigator (1986), featuring the first use of digital morphing in a film, Big Top Pee-wee (1988), White Fang (1991) and Honey, I Blew Up the Kid (1992). In London, Kleiser directed the comedy Getting It Right (1989). In 1996, he wrote and directed It's My Party. As a writer-producer, he was responsible for the surfing film North Shore (1987) for Universal Pictures. He also directed the thriller Shadow of Doubt (1998). In 1987, he had an agreement with upstart diversified film studio Management Company Entertainment Group to develop, direct and produce low-budget pictures that were financed by the studio, and he will shepherd indie projects of promising students and decided to build various international directors on its own.

Working in 70mm 3-D, he directed Honey, I Shrunk the Audience (1995) for the Disney theme parks in Anaheim, Orlando, Tokyo and Paris, re-teaming with most of the principal actors from Honey, I Blew Up the Kid.

Kleiser is openly gay.

== Filmography ==
=== Feature films ===
==== Filmmaking credits ====
Year	Title	Director	Producer	Screenwriter	Notes
1976	Street People	No	No	Yes	Italian: Gli esecutori
1978	Grease	Yes	No	No	Directorial debut
1980	The Blue Lagoon	Yes	Yes	No	
1982	Summer Lovers	Yes	Yes	Yes	
1984	Grandview, U.S.A.	Yes	No	No	
1986	Flight of the Navigator	Yes	No	No	
1987	North Shore	No	Executive	Story	
1988	Big Top Pee-wee	Yes	No	No	
1989	Getting It Right	Yes	Yes	No	
1991	White Fang	Yes	No	No	
1991	Return to the Blue Lagoon	No	Executive	No	
1992	Honey, I Blew Up the Kid	Yes	No	No	
1996	It's My Party	Yes	Yes	Yes	
1998	Shadow of Doubt	Yes	No	No	
1999	How to Get There	Yes	No	Yes	
2005	Love Wrecked	Yes	No	No	
2006	Red Riding Hood	Yes	No	No	Also arranger of the song "Lil' Red Riding Hood"
2020	Life After the Navigator	No	Executive	No	Documentary film

==== Acting credits ====
Year	Title	Role
1981	Rich and Famous	Literary Party Guest
1988	Big Top Pee-wee	Popcorn vendor
1996	Cannes Man	Himself
1998	Susan's Plan	Doctor No. 1
1999	Crazy in Alabama	Bob
2002	Circuit	Doctor

=== Short films ===
==== Filmmaking credits ====
Year	Title	Director	Writer	Producer	Notes
1973	Peege	Yes	Yes	No	Also editor
1973	Foot Fetish	Yes	Yes	Yes	Shortlisted for Academy Award for Best Animated Short Film
1994	Honey, I Shrunk the Audience!	Yes	No	No	Theme park film
2017	The Speech JFK Never Gave	Yes	Yes	Yes	
2019	Defrost: The Virtual Series	Yes	Yes	Yes	12-Episode VR Series
2019	Grease XR	Yes	No	No	Volumetric capture Short

==== Acting credits ====
Year	Title	Role	Notes
1962	The Pursuit	The Pursuer	
1964	Captain America vs. The Mutant	Steve Rogers / Captain America	
1966	Freiheit	Boy	

==== Other credits ====
Year	Title	Role
1967	Glut	Editor
2001	The Princess and the Pea	Production advisor
2015	Arctic Plunge	Technical advisor

=== Television ===
Year	Title	Director	Writer	Producer	Notes
1974–1975	Marcus Welby, M.D.	Yes	No	No	4 episodes
1975	Lucas Tanner	Yes	No	No	Episode: "Bonus Baby"
1975	All Together Now	Yes	No	No	TV movie
1975–1977	Starsky & Hutch	Yes	No	No	3 episodes
1976	The Rookies	Yes	No	No	Episode: "From Out of the Darkness"
1976	Family	Yes	No	No	2 episodes
1976	Dawn: Portrait of a Teenage Runaway	Yes	No	No	TV movie
1976	The Boy in the Plastic Bubble	Yes	No	No	TV movie
1977	ABC Weekend Specials	Yes	Yes	Yes	Episode: "Portrait of Grandpa Doc," also editor
1977	The Gathering	Yes	No	No	TV movie
1995	New York News	Yes	No	No	Unknown episodes
1999	Royal Standard	Yes	No	No	TV movie
2010	The Nina Foch Course for Filmmakers and Actors	Yes	Yes	Yes	

== Awards ==
- Nominee, Best Director – Saturn Awards, Honey, I Blew Up the Kid
- Nominee, Best Director – Saturn Awards, Flight of the Navigator
