= It's My Party (film) =

- Theatrical release poster
- Directed by: Randal Kleiser
- Written by: Randal Kleiser
- Produced by: Randal Kleiser; Robert Fitzpatrick; Gregory Hinton; Harry Knapp; Dessie Markovsky; Joel Thurm
- Starring: Margaret Cho; Bruce Davison; Lee Grant; Gregory Harrison; Marlee Matlin; Roddy McDowall; Olivia Newton-John; Bronson Pinchot; Paul Regina; Eric Roberts; George Segal
- Cinematography: Bernd Heinl
- Edited by: Ila von Hasperg
- Music by: Basil Poledouris
- Production companies: Opala Productions; United Artists
- Distributed by: MGM Distribution Co. (United States); United International Pictures (International)
- Release date: March 22, 1996
- Running time: 110 minutes
- Country: United States
- Language: English
- Box office: $622,503 (USA)

It's My Party is a 1996 American drama film written and directed by Randal Kleiser. It was one of the first feature films to address the topic of AIDS patients dying with dignity. The film is based on the true events of the death of Harry Stein, accomplished architect and designer, who was actually director Kleiser's ex-lover. Stein's actual farewell party was held in 1992.

The cast includes Olivia Newton-John, Margaret Cho, Bronson Pinchot, Devon Gummersall, George Segal, Lee Grant, Marlee Matlin, Roddy McDowall, Steve Antin, Bruce Davison, Sally Kellerman, Lou Liberatore, Nina Foch, Eric Roberts as Nick Stark and Gregory Harrison as Brandon, Stark's estranged lover who returns to attend the party and say goodbye. Kleiser directed Newton-John in Grease almost 20 years earlier.

== Plot ==
It's My Party chronicles a two-day party hosted by Nick Stark, a gay architect who, having been diagnosed with progressive multifocal leukoencephalopathy, will fall into a state of mental lapse lasting for months until his death. He decides to host a party for his family and friends, at the end of which he will commit suicide by taking Seconal.

"You won't leave me, will you?" Nick asks his estranged lover, Brandon Theis, a B movie director, shortly after revealing to him the results of his last blood test for HIV. "I don't want to die alone." In spite of Brandon's protestations, the two soon find the love they had shared for many years in ruins. One year after their breakup, Nick is confronted with a ravaged immune system and a CT Scan and lab values which, along with his worsening forgetfulness, clinches the diagnosis of Progressive multifocal leukoencephalopathy (PML) -- a condition he has seen claim his friends and one which he vows will not take him. Due to the aggressive nature of the disease, he has only a few days of conscious life remaining. His plan, he announces to family and "extended family," is to voluntarily end his life himself before the disease renders him unrecognizable to those he loves and he, in turn, is unable to recognize them. Uninvited to the farewell party, Brandon's presence is greeted with jeers from those who see him as having abandoned Nick in his time of greatest need.

== Cast ==
- Eric Roberts as Nick Stark
- Margaret Cho as Charlene Lee
- Lee Grant as Amalia Stark
- Bruce Davison as Rodney Bingham
- Olivia Newton-John as Lina Bingham
- Devon Gummersall as Andrew Bingham
- George Segal as Paul Stark
- Marlee Matlin as Daphne Stark
- Gregory Harrison as Brandon Theis
- Bronson Pinchot as Monty Tipton
- Roddy McDowall as Damian Knowles
- Steve Antin as Zack Phillips
- Sally Kellerman as Sara Hart
- Lou Liberatore as Joel Ferris
- Nina Foch as Mrs. Theis
- Christopher Atkins as Jack Allen
- Dennis Christopher as Douglas Reedy
- Ron Glass as Dr. David Wahl
- Paul Regina as Tony Zamara
- Dimitra Arliss as Fanny Kondons
- Joey Cramer (uncredited) as Party guest
- Cassandra Peterson (uncredited) as Party guest

== Background ==
Director Randal Kleiser recalls the movie was made in 1995, and at the time, Disney wanted him for Honey, I Blew Up the Kid, and he told them he would do it if they let me do an adult film next, and they went for it. But when he presented the project to them, "they hemmed and hawed." So after trying to get the movie made elsewhere, Kleiser finally went to see John Calley at United Artists, and after showing him photos from the actual party, he agreed to do it.

== Release ==
It's My Party opened in 28 theaters on March 22, 1996, with $148,532. The film would eventually gross $622,503 domestically.

== Home media ==
A DVD with several special features was released in 2003. It contains deleted and extended scenes, featurettes on the making of the film and audio commentary by the director and some of the actors.

== Reception ==
On Rotten Tomatoes, the film has an approval rating of 53% based on 15 reviews, with an average rating of 5.7/10.

Film critic Roger Ebert wrote in his review that "by the end of the film, in a quiet, understated way, director Randal Kleiser has created a genuine family feeling." He further noted that "the story is not so concerned with his disease or his decision as with recording the emotional tones that surround it." Critic Stephen Holden felt like the film "belongs to a genre that might be described as unsympathetic tear-jerking, since neither Nick nor Brandon is especially likable." In his view, he says "if this couple is intended to represent upscale gay life in Los Angeles at its noblest, that life seems shallow, cold-hearted and grossly materialistic."

Emanuel Levy stated that "Kleiser has managed to construct a tale that's emotionally uplifting and, in moments, inspiring, without being overly sentimental." Overall, he concludes that "ultimately this movie of moments suffers from too much colorful periphery and not enough center." Time Out observed that "despite the occasional longueur, all this is quietly engaging; still, for a weepie, let alone one about AIDS, it's peculiarly upbeat." In his review for Deseret News, Chris Hick opined that the movie "is one of those noble low-budget efforts that probably had no trouble attracting an all-star cast for its ensemble ... the result is a glossy, superficial effort, laced with stilted dialogue and never quite able to deliver the emotional charge it promises."

Caroline Westbrook from Empire Magazine wasn't impressed with the film, writing that this is "exactly the sort of hamfisted approach to supposedly sensitive storytelling that good directors try and avoid. It regains some ground towards the end, but for the most part it's just clumsy button pushing." Kevin Thomas wrote in the Los Angeles Times that the movie "is a heartbreaker, a film of naked emotion, first and foremost a love story." He also highlighted that "Kleiser has always had a special feel in portraying family relationships, and with this one, you are likely to be moved to tears."

== See also ==
- 1996 in film
- List of films featuring the deaf and hard of hearing
- List of LGBTQ-related films
