= Iris Acker =

American actress

- Born: June 13, 1930; The Bronx, New York, U.S.
- Died: September 16, 2018 (aged 88); Aventura, Florida, U.S.
- Occupations: Actress, television host, producer, dancer, writer
- Spouse: Philip Yacker (died 2010)
- Children: 2

Iris Acker (June 13, 1930 – September 16, 2018) was an American actress, television host, actors' union leader, television producer, artistic director, dancer, and author. The Sun Sentinel called Acker, who was based in South Florida, "one of the busiest actresses in the state." Acker, a union activist, served as the first Actors' Equity liaison for the U.S. state of Florida, as well as the first female president of the South Florida chapter of the American Federation of Television and Radio Artists.

Acker, who hosted and executive produced a string of interview and talk shows on Florida public television for more than 32 years, became one of South Florida's leading advocates for the arts. Her filmography, which spanned film and television, included Flight of the Navigator (1986), Whoops Apocalypse (1986), and Cocoon: The Return (1988), as well as more than 250 television commercials.

== Biography ==
Acker was born and raised in The Bronx, New York. As a child, Acker watched movies starring Fred Astaire, Eleanor Powell, and Ginger Rogers and decided to become a dancer. In an interview with the Miami Herald years later, she recalled, "I talked my mother into letting me take dance classes, and I quickly excelled...I was performing professionally in my teens..." Acker became a member of The Rockettes at Radio City Music Hall, which she revealed during a 1992 interview with Pia Zadora.

She performed in supporting roles in touring theater companies, which first led her to Florida. In 1970, she also appeared in Interplay. In 1974, Acker and her husband, Philip Yacker (she amended his surname to "Acker" for professional use but Yacker was her legal surname), moved from New York to South Florida. She soon met and developed a working partnership with Charlie Cinnamon, a press agent and prominent figure in South Florida's theater community. On stage, Acker starred in a number of productions in South Florida's theater scene. Her credits included Norman, Is That You?, the first production performed at the Burt Reynolds Dinner Theater (now called the Maltz Jupiter Theatre) in Jupiter, Florida. In the mid-1970s, Acker co-starred with Julie Newmar in the Fort Lauderdale production of The Marriage-Go-Round.

Acker hosted a series of talk and interview shows focusing of the arts in South Florida for more than 32 years. Her talk-show career began at WLRN-TV in Miami when a WLRN station executive asked inquired if she would be interested in hosting a show on the local arts. Acker had never hosted a television show before, but had appeared as an entertainer on shows while growing up in New York City and thought she could learn on the job, so she accepted. Her earliest shows were broadcasts of acting classes with her fellow acting teachers.

The show evolved into her longtime interview show, On Stage With Iris Acker, thanks her national contacts in the entertainment industry, and those of her agent, Charlie Cinnamon. Guests on her one-on-one format show included Theodore Bikel, Phyllis Diller, Estelle Getty, Valerie Harper, Hal Linden, Chita Rivera, Edward Villella, and Pia Zadora. In addition to national celebrities, Acker hosted regional Florida acts on her show, including actor Nick Santa Maria, with whom she performed in Bye Bye Birdie, and folk singer Amy Carol Webb. She also used her show to promote the arts and theater in South Florida, including the Actors' Playhouse at the Miracle Theatre, which she supported since its opening in 1988, and the Coconut Grove Playhouse.

On Stage With Iris Acker aired on WLRN for 11 years before moving to WXEL-TV in West Palm Beach. It later switched to Comcast. From 2013 to 2018, her show, which she continued to helm as part of a multihost interview panel format under the new name Spotlight on the Arts, moved to BECON-TV.

Acker simultaneously served as the creative director of the Shores Performing Arts Theatre in Miami Shores, Florida, from 1992 until 1996. She gave roles to actors who were in the early stages of their careers at the theatre, including actor Wayne LeGette, telling the Miami Herald in a 1994 interview, "I was the one being discovered before. Now the tables have turned...Being able to help somebody is as gratifying as helping myself."

On screen, Acker was cast in a number of film and television shows that were filmed in Miami or the surrounding region. Her films included Flight of the Navigator (1986), Bachelor Party (1984), Whoops Apocalypse (1986), and Cocoon: The Return (1988). Her television credits included a 1990 role as a judge in the CBS series, Wiseguy, and the television film, Doubles, with Steve Landesberg.

Acker appeared in more than 250 national and regional television commercials, including a 1990 spot for Mr. Coffee with Joe DiMaggio and a commercial for a vacuum cleaner with Tony Randall. Her commercial work led to her first book, "The Secrets To Auditioning for Commercials." She also penned a retrospect of her interviews with actors and other notable individuals in "So, What Got You Where You Are Today."

Acker served as a judge for the Carbonell Awards, which honors productions and talent in South Florida's regional theater. She also partnered with theater critic Ron Levitt and playwright Tony Finstron to create the Silver Palm Awards in 2008, an honor for South Florida theater artists which is comparable to Broadway's Obie Awards.

== Death ==
Acker lived with pancreatic cancer for the final six years of her life. She died from the disease after radiation treatments at Aventura Hospital and Medical Center in Aventura, Florida, on September 16, 2018, at the age of 88. She was survived by her two sons, Mitch and Robert Yacker, three grandchildren, and four great-grandchildren. Her husband, Philip, had died in 2010.

== Awards and honors ==
Acker's awards and recognitions included the lifetime achievement and Remy Pioneer Awards from the Theatre League of South Florida, the Breaking the Glass Ceiling Award from the Jewish Museum of Florida, the Women Who Make a Difference honor from the YWCA, and the 2015 Howard Kleinberg Award at the 2015 Carbonell Awards for "contributions to the health and development of the arts in South Florida."
