= Flight of the Navigator =

1986 American science-fiction film by Randal Kleiser

- Theatrical release poster
- Directed by: Randal Kleiser
- Screenplay by: Michael Burton; Phil Joanou (as Matt MacManus)
- Story by: Mark H. Baker
- Produced by: Dimitri Villard; Robert Wald
- Starring: Joey Cramer
- Cinematography: James Glennon
- Edited by: Jeff Gourson; Janice Parker
- Music by: Alan Silvestri
- Production companies: PSO Productions; Viking Film AS
- Distributed by: Buena Vista Distribution Co. Inc. (United States) (Note: Distributed under the Walt Disney Pictures banner.); PSO Productions (International)
- Release date: August 1, 1986
- Running time: 89 minutes
- Countries: United States; Norway
- Language: English
- Budget: $9 million
- Box office: $18.6 million

Flight of the Navigator is a 1986 American science-fiction adventure film directed by Randal Kleiser and written by Mark H. Baker, Michael Burton, and Phil Joanou. It stars Joey Cramer as David Freeman, a 12-year-old boy abducted by an alien spaceship who, as an unfortunate side-effect, is transported eight years into the future. It features an early film appearance by Sarah Jessica Parker as Carolyn McAdams, a key character in the future whom David befriends.

The film's producers initially sent the project to Walt Disney Pictures in 1984, but the studio was unable to approve it, and it was sent to Producers Sales Organization, which made a deal with Disney to distribute it in the United States. It was partially shot in Fort Lauderdale, Florida, and Norway, being a co-production with Norwegian company Viking Film.

The film is notable for being one of the first Hollywood films to use extensive computer-generated imagery (CGI) effects. Specifically, it was the first use of image-based lighting and an early use of morphing in a motion picture. It is one of the first Hollywood productions to feature an entirely electronic music film score, composed using a Synclavier, one of the first digital multitrack recorders and samplers.

The film has since developed a cult following among science-fiction and Disney fans. The latest plans for a reboot were announced in 2021.

== Plot ==
On July 4, 1978, in Fort Lauderdale, Florida, 12-year-old David Freeman walks through the woods to pick up his 8-year-old brother, Jeff, from a friend's house when he falls into a ravine after a trick Jeff plays on him and is knocked unconscious. When he revives, eight years have mysteriously passed, and it is now 1986. He has not aged, and his appearance exactly matches his missing child poster. He is reunited with his aged parents and the repentant, now-16-year-old Jeff.

Meanwhile, an alien spaceship crashes through power lines and is captured by NASA. Hospital tests on David's brainwaves reveal matching images of the spacecraft and a map of its galaxy origins. Dr. Louis Faraday, who has been studying it, persuades David to come to a NASA research facility for just 48 hours, promising him they can help learn what happened to him.

Dr. Faraday discovers that his mind is full of alien technical manuals and star charts far exceeding NASA's research and that he was taken to the planet Phaelon and back, with a round-trip distance of 1,120 light-years, in just 4.4 hours. Travel at relativistic, or faster than light (FTL) speeds, causes an individual to experience time dilation. This is the case for David: eight years have passed on Earth, but only 4.4 hours for him. Dr. Faraday decides to quarantine him there to finish his investigation, breaking his initial 48-hour promise.

Following a telepathic communication from the spaceship, David secretly boards it and meets its robotic commander, who introduces himself as a Trimaxion Drone Ship. David decides to call him "Max", while Max calls him the "Navigator". They escape from the facility, and Max tells David that his mission is to travel the galaxy collecting biological specimens for analysis on Phaelon, before returning them to their homes. Phaelon's scientists discovered that humans only use 10% of their brains, and as an experiment, filled the remainder of David's brain with miscellaneous information. Max returned him to Earth, but the Earth of 1986, having determined a trip back in time would be dangerous for a human. When Max crashed the spaceship, the computer's databanks were erased, so he needs the information in David's brain to return home.

While Max prepares for a mind transfer, David meets other alien specimens aboard and bonds with a puckmaren, a tiny, bat-like creature that is the last of its kind after a comet destroyed its planet. During the mind transfer, Max contracts human emotions and behaves eccentrically. David and his bickering trigger UFO reports in Tokyo and the United States. Meanwhile, NASA intern Carolyn McAdams, who befriended David, tells his family about his escape in the spaceship. Dr. Faraday has them confined to their house, and Carolyn is sent back to the facility.

When the spaceship stops at a gas station, David calls Jeff, who sets off fireworks on the roof to locate their new house. David and Max arrive there, but NASA agents have tracked the spaceship. Fearing that he will be institutionalized and treated like a guinea pig for the rest of his life should he remain in 1986, David orders Max to return him to 1978, accepting the risk of vaporization due to the time travel. David awakes in the ravine, walks home, and finds everything now as he had left it. During the Fourth of July celebration, Jeff sees that the puckmaren has stowed away in David's backpack. David tells him to keep it a secret, while Max flies home across the fireworks-lit sky, laughing similarly to Pee-wee Herman and calls, "See you later, navigator!"

== Cast ==
- Joey Cramer as David Scott Freeman
- Veronica Cartwright as Helen Freeman
- Cliff DeYoung as Bill Freeman
- Sarah Jessica Parker as Carolyn McAdams
- Matt Adler as Jeff Freeman (16 years old)
  - Albie Whitaker as Jeff Freeman (8 years old)
- Howard Hesseman as Dr. Louis Faraday
- Paul Reubens as the voice of Max (credited as Paul Mall)
- Jonathan Sanger as Dr. Carr
- Iris Acker as Janet Howard
- Richard Liberty as Larry Howard
- Raymond Forchion as Detective Banks
- Keri Rogers as Jennifer Bradley

=== Casting ===
Several actors auditioned for the role of David Freeman, including Joaquin Phoenix and Chris O'Donnell.

== Production ==
Some of the scenes with the Trimaxion Drone Ship were rendered in CGI by Omnibus Computer Animation, under the supervision of director Randal Kleiser's brother, Jeff. It was the first film to use reflection mapping to create realistic reflections on a simulated chrome surface.

Jeff explained that Randal had been inspired by work for a commercial that he had done at his previous company, Digital Effects. Jeff recalls, "Jean Miller and Bob Hoffman had written a reflection mapping software that simulated a drop of water dripping from a faucet, which had refraction and reflection on the spout and it drips off." According to Jeff, "Randal saw that and asked, 'Wow. Could you make the spaceship reflective, like reflecting the environment?’" The morphing effect was based on a 1985 work by Digital Effects for a Tide detergent commercial.

Effects were rendered on the Foonly F1 computer before being matted onto the film print. The computer did not have much storage space, so once the frame was mapped, the data were deleted to make way for the new frame. Other scenes of the ship were shot using one of two life-size props or using miniatures; most of the miniature shots were made using a motion control system.

The interiors of the ship were shot inside a warehouse one hour outside of Oslo, because the producer claimed he had blocked funds which were only available if used in Norway. According to director Kleiser, it is uncertain if the funds ever came through, and the crew could have flown from Florida to Norway for no reason.

== Soundtrack ==
The music score for the film was composed and performed by Alan Silvestri. It is distinct from his other scores in being entirely electronically generated, using the Synclavier, one of the first digital multi-track recorders and samplers.

Flight of the Navigator

Soundtrack album by Alan Silvestri
- Released: 1986
- Genres: Electronic, film score
- Label: Super Tracks Music Group

1. Theme from "Flight of the Navigator"
2. "Main Title"
3. "The Ship Beckons"
4. "David in the Woods"
5. "Robot Romp"
6. "Transporting the Ship"
7. "Ship Drop"
8. "Have to Help a Friend"
9. "The Shadow Universe"
10. "Flight"
11. "Finale"
12. "Star Dancing"

== Critical reception ==
The film received mainly positive reviews. Rotten Tomatoes gave it a rating of 85% based on 33 reviews, with an average rating of 6.6/10. The consensus reads, "Bolstered by impressive special effects and a charming performance from its young star, Flight of the Navigator holds up as a solidly entertaining bit of family-friendly sci-fi."

Kevin Thomas of the Los Angeles Times said the film's biggest plus was "its entirely believable, normal American family." The New York Times described it as "definitely a film most children can enjoy." People declared it "out-of-this-world fun." Empire gave it 3/5 stars, saying it was "well-made enough to keep the family happy, but it certainly won’t challenge them." Variety was more critical, announcing that "instead of creating an eye-opening panorama, Flight of the Navigator looks through the small end of the telescope." Dave Kehr gave it 3 stars and described it as "a new high for Disney."

John Nubbin reviewed Flight of the Navigator for Different Worlds magazine and stated that "All in all, The Flight of the Navigator is one of the best science-fiction films in quite some time. It borders on the cute, true enough, but borders only. If suffers from none of the terminal 'smiley face' writing, or directing, or mugging on the part of the cast which has sent so many Disney films down the tubes since Uncle Walt passed on, leaving his studio in the hands of people who were business men first and dreamers second - instead of the other way around."

=== Special effects analysis ===
In May 2021, independent filmmaker Alan Melikdjanian released a documentary about the film, explaining the various types of visual effects utilized to create the alien spaceship.

== Remake ==
In May 2009, The Hollywood Reporter reported that Disney was readying a remake of the film. Brad Copeland was writing the script and Mandeville partners David Hoberman and Todd Lieberman would serve as producers. In November 2012, Disney hired Safety Not Guaranteed's director Colin Trevorrow and writer/producer Derek Connolly to rewrite the script.

In September 2017, Walt Disney Pictures and Lionsgate announced that a reboot of the film is in preproduction with Joe Henderson from TV's Lucifer writing the script. In November that year, Neill Blomkamp tweeted that Oats Studios has begun developing a reboot as its first feature film.

In September 2021, plans for a remake were announced, with Bryce Dallas Howard set to direct and produce the Disney+ release featuring a female protagonist.

== See also ==
- E.T. the Extra-Terrestrial
- Life After the Navigator
- List of time travel works of fiction
- Mac and Me
