= Hallandale Beach, Florida =

Hallandale Beach
- City
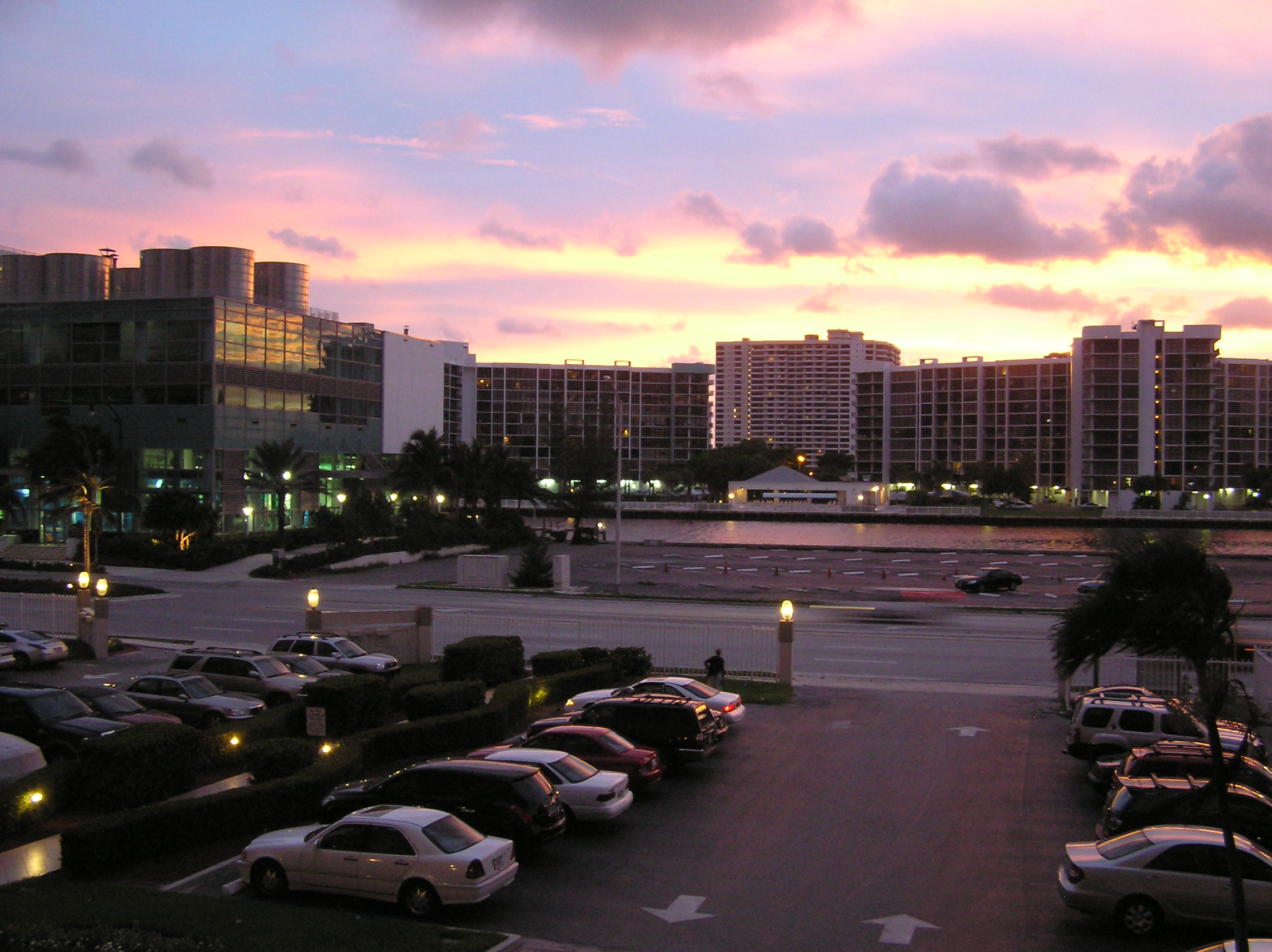
- Sunset at Hallandale Beach

- Flag
- Nicknames: "Southernmost Canadian City" "Canada's Southernmost City"
- Motto(s): "Progress. Innovation. Opportunity." "City of Choice"
- Interactive map of Hallandale Beach
- Coordinates: 25°59′03″N 80°07′58″W
- Country: United States
- State: Florida
- County: Broward
- Settled (Halland Settlement): c. 1895
- Incorporated (Town of Hallandale): May 14, 1927
- Incorporated (City of Hallandale): August 27, 1947
- Incorporated (City of Hallandale Beach): August 27, 1999
- Named for: Luther Halland

Government
  - Type: Commission-Manager

Area
  - City: 4.61 sq mi (11.95 km^{2})
  - Land: 4.21 sq mi (10.91 km^{2})
  - Water: 0.40 sq mi (1.04 km^{2}) 7.47%
- Elevation: 7 ft (2.1 m)

Population (2020)
  - City: 41,217
  - Density: 9,785.3/sq mi (3,778.14/km^{2})
  - Metro: 5,564,635
- Time zone: UTC-5 (EST)
  - Summer (DST): UTC-4 (EDT)
- ZIP code: 33009
- Area codes: 754, 954
- FIPS code: 12-28452
- GNIS feature ID: 2403783
- Website: hallandalebeachfl.gov

Hallandale Beach (formerly known simply as Hallandale) is a city in southern Broward County, Florida, United States. The city is named after Luther Halland, the son of a Swedish worker for Henry Flagler's Florida East Coast Railroad. It is also part of the Miami metropolitan area. As of the 2023 census, its population was 41,547.

The city is known as the home of Gulfstream Park (horse racing and casino) and Big Easy Casino, which hosts the World Classic. It also has a sizable downtown financial district with banks, brokerage houses, and restaurants. Together with neighbouring Hollywood, Florida, it is a popular center for Canadian tourists, leading to its description as "Canada's southernmost city."

== History ==
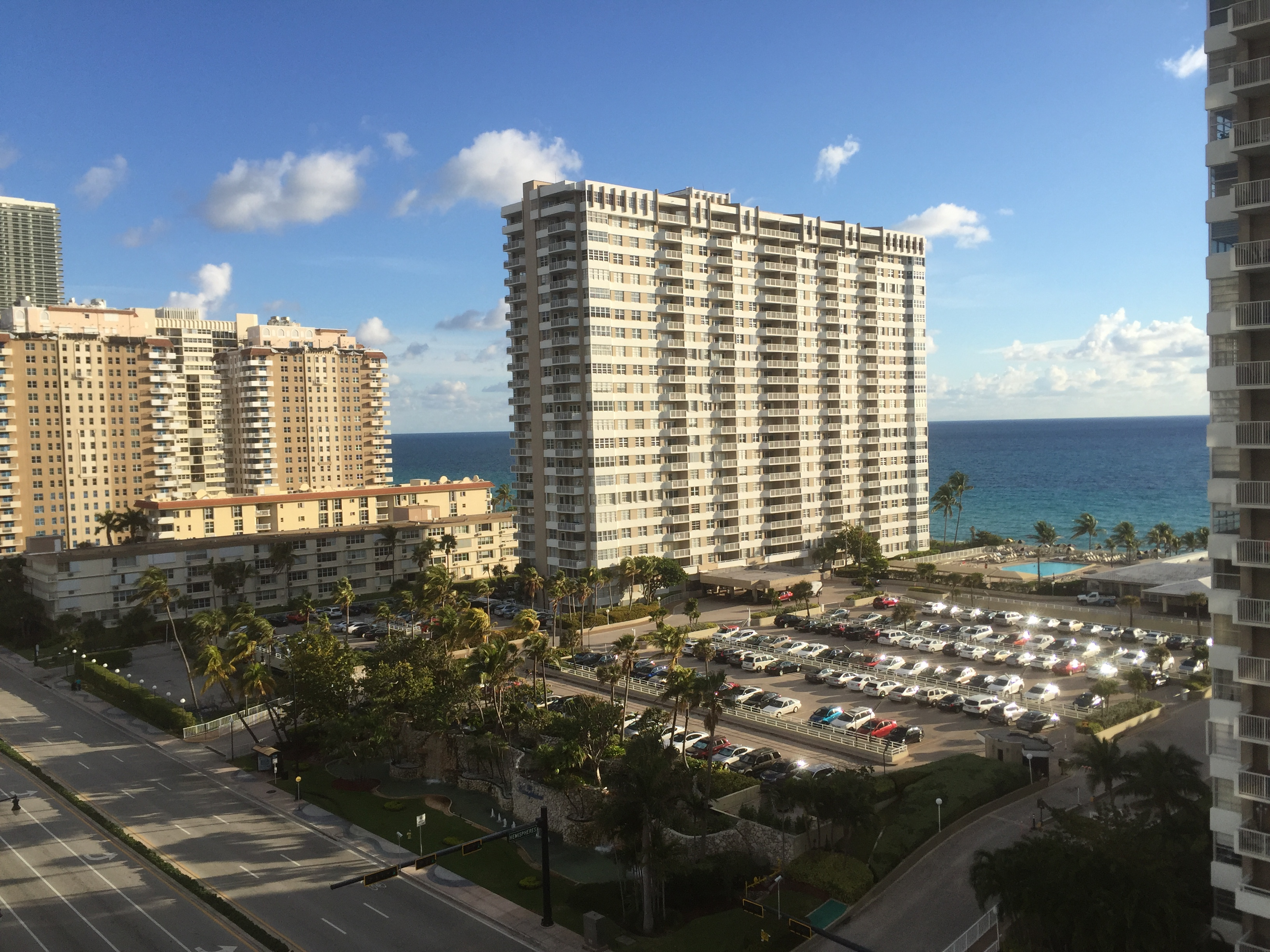
View from Hallandale Beach Apartments (January 2019)

Railroad magnate Henry Flagler, owner of the Florida East Coast Railway, recruited Luther Halland, a brother-in-law of Flagler's agents, to found a settlement south of the community of Dania. Halland and Swedish immigrant Olaf Zetterlund touted the frost-free climate and cheap land of the settlement (then named Halland, later changed to Hallandale). Halland constructed a small trading post and became the first postmaster of the small community.

By 1900, the community had slowly grown to a dozen families—seven of Swedish, three of English, and two of African American descent. In 1904, the first school was built, and the first church followed two years later. Hallandale was primarily a farming community.

Hallandale was incorporated on May 14, 1927, the eighth municipality in Broward County. By that time, a thriving community of 1,500 residents, with electricity and street lights, was in place. In 1947, the Town of Hallandale was reincorporated as the City of Hallandale, allowing it to expand its borders through annexation of nearby unincorporated land lying adjacent to the Atlantic shore. On August 27, 1999, the city officially changed its name to Hallandale Beach.

Hurricane Katrina first made landfall between Hallandale Beach and Aventura, Florida.

Hurricane Irma was originally expected to go right through Hallandale Beach, instead making landfall in Key West, and once again in Naples.

== Geography ==
According to the United States Census Bureau, the city has a total area 4.55 square miles (12 km^{2}). of which .34 sq mi (1 km^{2}) (7.47%) is covered by water.

Hollywood is located north of Hallandale Beach, Aventura in Miami-Dade County is south of the city, the Atlantic Ocean is to the east, and Pembroke Park is to the west.

Although a map apparently shows that a small portion of the Golden Isles neighborhood extends into Miami-Dade County, this land was actually transferred to Broward County, and annexed to Hallandale Beach in 1978.

=== Climate ===
Hallandale Beach has a tropical climate, similar to the climate found in much of the Caribbean. It is part of the only region in the 48 contiguous states that falls under that category. More specifically, it generally has a tropical monsoon climate (Köppen climate classification, Am).

== Demographics ==
Historical population
Census	Pop.	Note	%±
1930	1,012		—
1940	1,827		80.5%
1950	3,886		112.7%
1960	10,483		169.8%
1970	23,849		127.5%
1980	36,517		53.1%
1990	30,996		−15.1%
2000	34,282		10.6%
2010	37,113		8.3%
2020	41,217		11.1%
U.S. Decennial Census

=== Racial and ethnic composition ===
Hallandale Beach racial composition (Hispanics excluded from racial categories) (NH = Non-Hispanic)
Race	Pop 2010	Pop 2020	% 2010	% 2020
White (NH)	17,695	16,789	47.68%	40.73%
Black or African American (NH)	6,548	6,549	17.64%	15.89%
Native American or Alaska Native (NH)	37	32	0.10%	0.08%
Asian (NH)	520	740	1.40%	1.80%
Pacific Islander or Native Hawaiian (NH)	9	12	0.02%	0.03%
Some other race (NH)	97	333	0.26%	0.81%
Two or more races/Multiracial (NH)	398	1,096	1.07%	2.66%
Hispanic or Latino (any race)	11,809	15,666	31.82%	38.01%
Total	37,113	41,217		

=== 2020 census ===
As of the 2020 census, Hallandale Beach had a population of 41,217. The median age was 46.9 years. 16.0% of residents were under the age of 18 and 24.4% of residents were 65 years of age or older. For every 100 females there were 89.3 males, and for every 100 females age 18 and over there were 87.4 males age 18 and over.

100.0% of residents lived in urban areas, while 0.0% lived in rural areas.

There were 19,512 households in Hallandale Beach, of which 20.8% had children under the age of 18 living in them. Of all households, 34.5% were married-couple households, 23.6% were households with a male householder and no spouse or partner present, and 35.5% were households with a female householder and no spouse or partner present. About 38.5% of all households were made up of individuals and 17.8% had someone living alone who was 65 years of age or older. There were 9,135 families residing in the city.

There were 28,443 housing units, of which 31.4% were vacant. The homeowner vacancy rate was 2.0% and the rental vacancy rate was 10.0%.

Racial composition as of the 2020 census
Race	Number	Percent
White	20,073	48.7%
Black or African American	6,774	16.4%
American Indian and Alaska Native	159	0.4%
Asian	763	1.9%
Native Hawaiian and Other Pacific Islander	21	0.1%
Some other race	4,527	11.0%
Two or more races	8,900	21.6%
Hispanic or Latino (of any race)	15,666	38.0%

=== 2010 census ===
As of the 2010 United States census, 37,113 people, 17,616 households, and 8,770 families were living in the city.

=== 2000 census ===
As of the 2000 census, of the 18,051 households, 12.5% had children under 18 living with them, 35.8% were married couples living together, 9.1% had a female householder with no husband present, and 51.8% were not families. About 45.2% of all households were made up of individuals, and 25.8% had someone living alone who was 65 or older. The average household size was 1.88 and the average family size was 2.60.

In 2000, in the city, the age distribution was 13.2% under 18, 5.3% from 18 to 24, 22.9% from 25 to 44, 22.8% from 45 to 64, and 35.8% who were 65 or older. The median age was 53 years. For every 100 females, there were 85.6 males. For every 100 females 18 and over, there were 82.6 males.

In 2000, the median income for a household in the city was $28,266, and for a family was $37,171. Males had a median income of $31,287 versus $24,882 for females. The per capita income for the city was $22,464. About 13.1% of families and 16.8% of the population were below the poverty line, including 26.4% of those under 18 and 13.0% of those 65 or over.

As of 2000, English was spoken as a first language by 59.66% of the population, while Spanish was spoken by 19.50%. In this "southernmost Canadian city" French was spoken by 5.23% of the population, most of them French Canadians. Other languages spoken at home were Romanian at 2.71%, Italian at 1.96%, Haitian Creole at 1.80%, Yiddish 1.70%, Russian 1.32%, German 1.27%, Hungarian at 1.17%, Polish at 0.85%, Hebrew at 0.77%, and Portuguese, spoken by 0.72% of all residents.

=== Ancestry ===
As of 2022, excluding the Canadian and Hispanic and Latino population, 6.5% of the residents were of American ancestry, 5.8% were Russian, 4.8% were Haitian, 4.0% Italian, 3.7% Romanian, and 3.3% of the populace shared Ukrainian ancestry.

== Public schools ==
Hallandale Beach's public schools are part of Broward County Public Schools.

In almost all areas, elementary and middle school students are zoned for Gulfstream Academy of Hallandale Beach for kindergarten to grade 8. A portion of the city is zoned to Colbert Elementary School and McNicol Middle School. In all areas, high school students are zoned for Hallandale High School. Private academies eschewing the public system are present in the area.

== Media ==
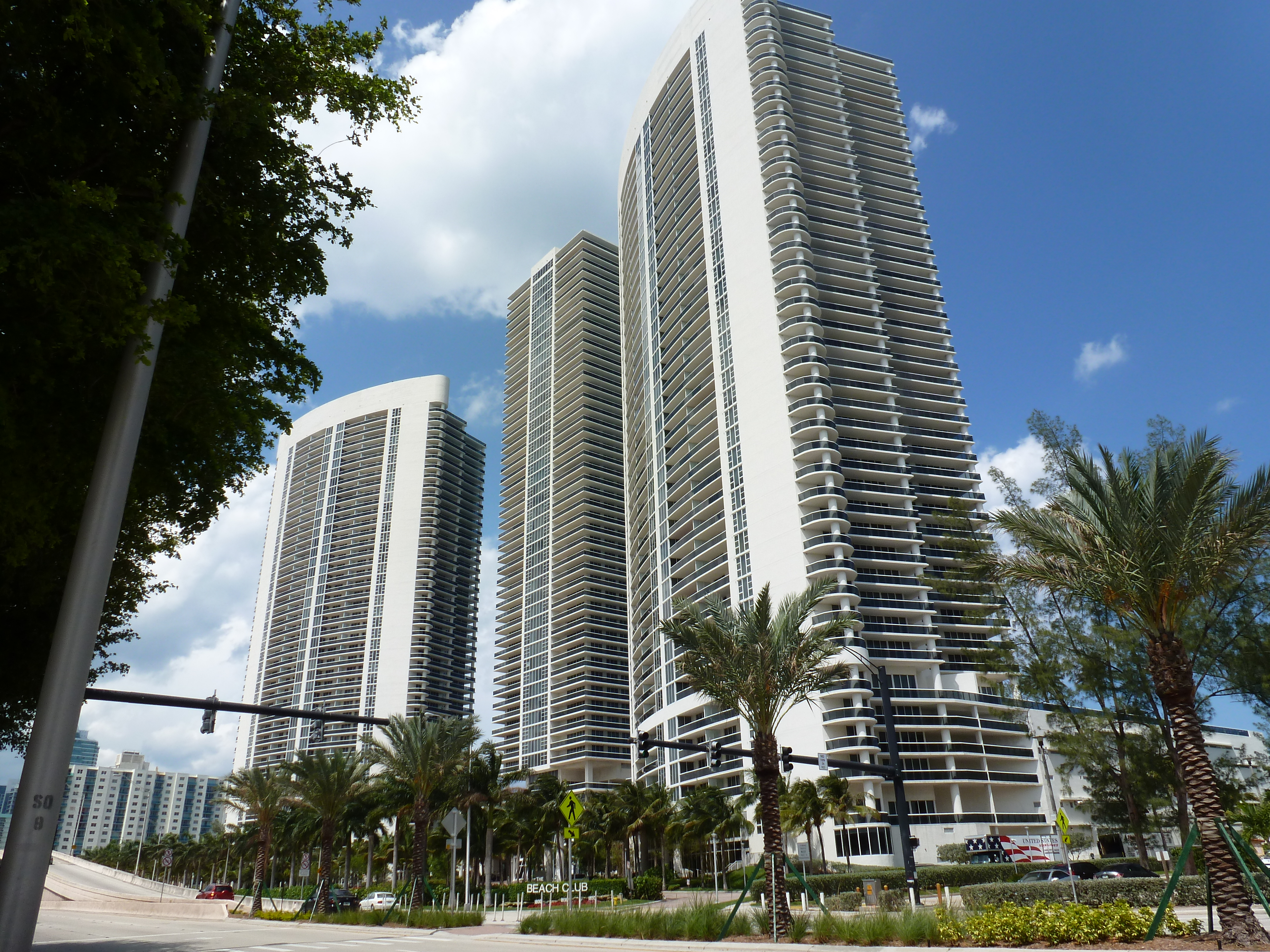
The Hallandale Beach Club is the tallest building in Broward County

Hallandale Beach is a part of the Miami-Fort Lauderdale-Hollywood media market, which is the 12th-largest radio market and the 17th-largest television market in the United States. Its primary daily newspapers are the South Florida-Sun Sentinel and The Miami Herald, and their Spanish-language counterparts El Sentinel and El Nuevo Herald. The Broward-Palm Beach New Times, an alternative weekly, is widely available around the city. Hallandale Beach has its own newspaper, the South Florida Sun-Times, which is published weekly.

== Public transportation ==
Hallandale Beach is served by several bus routes operated by Broward County Transit.

A free community minibus service, operated by the city of Hallandale Beach, also operates on four routes within the city limits and neighboring areas of Hollywood and Aventura.

== Notable people ==
- Iris Acker (1930–2018), arts advocate, actress (Flight of the Navigator), dancer, and television host
- Stewart H. Appleby (1890–1964), represented New Jersey's 3rd congressional district from 1925 to 1927.
- Morris Childs (1902–1991), double agent for the F.B.I. against the Soviet Union.
- Davin Joseph (1983–), former NFL player for the Tampa Bay Buccaneers and St. Louis Rams
- Meyer Lansky (1902–1983), Jewish gangster; financial wizard of the National Crime Syndicate
- Anthony Provenzano (1917–1988), Italian-American mobster featured in the movie The Irishman
- Mike ter Maat (1961-), former 2024 vice presidential candidate for the Libertarian Party.

== See also ==
- Hallandale Beach Police Department
