= John Allen Nelson =

American actor and screenwriter

- Occupations: Actor; screenwriter
- Years active: 1983–present

John Allen Nelson is an American actor and screenwriter. He is best known for his roles on television as Warren Lockridge on Santa Barbara, John D. Cort on Baywatch, Walt Cummings in 24 and Silas Bunch in Crazy Ex-Girlfriend. He is also known for starring in the cult classic science fiction comedy horror film Killer Klowns from Outer Space.

== Career ==
Nelson portrayed original series character Warren Lockridge on the American soap opera Santa Barbara from August 1, 1984, to April 29, 1986. He starred as the title character in the low-budget 1987 comedy-fantasy Hunk where a nerd was transformed into a golden-tanned, muscular hunk after "leasing" his soul to the Devil.

Nelson co-starred in the 1988 cult/sci-fi epic Killer Klowns from Outer Space.

Nelson co-starred (and later recurred) in the early seasons of the series Baywatch as "John D. Cort," a lifeguard who is ultimately forced to retire because of retinitis pigmentosa. Later, Nelson co-starred with fellow Baywatch alum Gena Lee Nolin in the syndicated Sheena, Queen of the Jungle.

Nelson also co-wrote the screenplay for the martial arts-yarn Best of the Best 2, which was released in 1993, as well as American Yakuza starring Viggo Mortensen. The following year, in 1994, Nelson co-wrote and co-starred in the movie Criminal Passion which featured Joan Severance and Anthony Denison.

Nelson may be best known for his role as Walt Cummings in 24, or the role of Senator Jeffrey Collins in the 2006 Fox drama Vanished.

Nelson also appeared as Paul, Monica Geller's boyfriend (also known as "The Wine Guy") in the first episode of Friends. His most recent role is Everett Reid in Virgin River.

== Filmography ==
=== Film ===
Year	Film	Role
1987	Saigon Commandos	Timothy Bryant
1987	Hunk	Hunk Golden
1988	Deathstalker and the Warriors from Hell	Deathstalker
1988	Killer Klowns from Outer Space	Dave Hanson
1993	Taking Liberty	
1994	Criminal Passion	Connor Ashcroft
1996	Follow Me Home	Perry
1998	Marry Me or Die	
1998	Shelter	Martin Roberts
2009	Feast III: The Happy Finish	Shitkicker
2010	The Town	HRT/FBI Swat Commander

=== Television ===
Year	Program or series	Role	Notes
1983	Loving	Duke Rochelle	
1984	The Edge of Night	Jack Boyd	
1984–86	Santa Barbara	Warren Lockridge	
1987	Scarecrow and Mrs. King	Brian Dubinski	
1987	Hunter	Dr. Tim Donaldson	
1987	Buck James	Buddy Cronin	
1988	Heartbeat	Bobby	
1989	Perry Mason: The Case of the Lethal Lesson	Frank Wellman Jr.	
1989	Quantum Leap	Capt. Bill 'Bird Dog' Birdell	
1989–90	Booker	Ronald Arrizola	
1989, 1993	Matlock	Terry Maslin, Bill Parker	two episodes
1989–95	Baywatch	John D. Cort	
1990	Rich Men, Single Women	Travis	
1991	Murder, She Wrote	Tod Sterling	
1994	XXX's & OOO's	Andy St. James	
1994	Friends	Paul, The Wine Guy	
1994	Sweet Justice	Logan Wright	
1997	Pensacola: Wings of Gold	Captain Tom Redding	
1998	Seven Days	Mike Clary	
1998	Early Edition	Ricky Brown	
1999	V.I.P.	FBI Agent Lambert	
2000–02	Sheena	Matt Cutter	
2003	Baywatch: Hawaiian Wedding	John D. Cort	
2005	CSI: Miami	Mike Rydell	
2005–06	24	Walt Cummings	
2006	Vanished	Senator Jeffrey Collins	
2007	Close to Home	William Sheffield	
2007	Saving Grace	Buck Crussing	
2008	Burn Notice	Lesher	
2008	Without a Trace	Mark Duncan	
2008	Knight Rider	Congressman Childress	
2008	Grey's Anatomy	Arthur Saltonoff	
2008–09	Privileged	Arthur Smith	
2009	Inside the Box	Special Agent Tompkins	
2009	Criminal Minds	Dan Murphy	
2009	Drop Dead Diva	D.A. Callahan	
2013	Castle	Walter Dennis	
2014	Crisis	President DeVore	Recurring
2016–17	Crazy Ex-Girlfriend	Silas Bunch	
2023	Virgin River	Everett Reid	
