= Daniel Lucas =

Daniel Lucas may refer to:

- Daniel Anthony Lucas (1978–2016), American convicted murderer
- Daniel B. Lucas (1836–1909), American poet and lawyer
- Daniel Lucas, editor of Chess Life
- Daniel Lucas (Vanished character), character on the television show Vanished
- Dani Segovia (born 1985), Spanish professional footballer
- Danny Lucas (born 1958), Canadian ice hockey right winger
