= Steve Levitt =

Steve Levitt may refer to:

- Steve Levitt (actor) (born 1960), American actor
- Steven Levitt (born 1967), American economist
