= Robert Hoffman (actor) =

American actor and producer

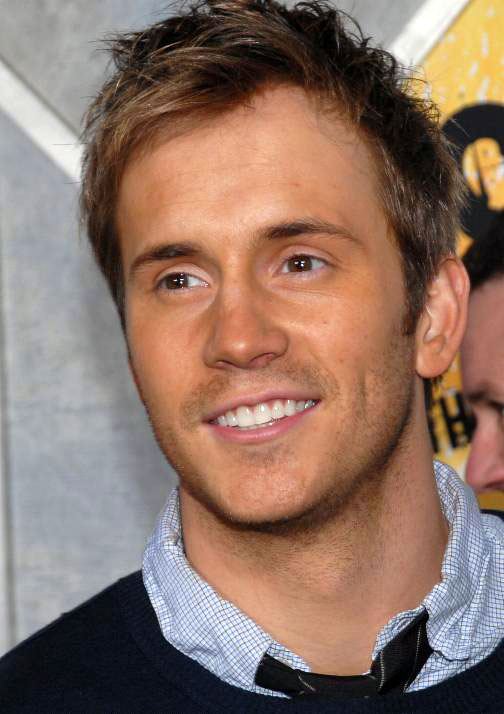
- Hoffman at the premiere of Step Up 2: The Streets in July 2008
- Born: Robert James Hoffman III; Gainesville, Florida, U.S.
- Occupations: Actor, Dancer, Producer, Choreographer
- Years active: 2003–present

Robert James Hoffman III is an American actor, producer, dancer, and choreographer.

== Career ==
Hoffman publishes comedy sketches and dance videos on YouTube on his PUNCHROBERT channel, including "The Yes Dance", "Urban Ninja" and "Contemporary Eric". His videos have also been hosted on eBaum's World.

In 2004, Hoffman starred in the film You Got Served as Max, a lead dancer in the antagonist's crew. He also starred in Nick Cannon's sketch comedy television series Wild 'n Out. In 2006, he co-starred alongside Amanda Bynes in the film She's the Man.

In 2007, Hoffman played the role of Bluto in the horror film Shrooms. He also played the role of Clyde "Windmill" Wynorski in the comedy film National Lampoon's Bag Boy.

In 2008, he starred in the film Step Up 2: The Streets as Chase Collins, a dancer at the Maryland School of the Arts (M.S.A). On 1 June 2008, Step Up 2: The Streets earned Hoffman and co-star Briana Evigan an MTV Movie Award for Best Kiss. In 2008, he and Evigan starred in Enrique Iglesias's music video for his single "Push", where they reprised their Step Up roles.

Hoffman appeared in the 2009 film Aliens in the Attic as Ricky Dillman. In 2010, Hoffman played the role of Chad Bower in the comedy thriller film Burning Palms. He played the role of Tyler "Dance Machine" Jones in the movie Take Me Home Tonight.

He was also featured in Garfunkel and Oates's music video for their song "Present Face". In late January 2012, Hoffman landed a recurring role in the fourth season of The CW's teen drama series 90210 as Caleb Walsh, a student at seminary school studying to become a priest.

In 2014, Hoffman starred as Kevin Shepherd in the indie drama Lap Dance alongside Briana Evigan, Ali Cobrin, and Carmen Electra. Hoffman guest starred as Thad Callahan in the TV show The Night Shift. In 2016, he had a role in the comedy film Amateur Night directed by Lisa Addario and Joe Syracuse.

In 2009, Hoffman produced “The PunchRobert Show” for MTV. The show was meant as a star vehicle for Hoffman and was based on his YouTube channel, but has not made it to air.

== Filmography ==
Film
Year	Title	Role	Notes
2003	From Justin to Kelly	Dancer	
2003	Gigli	Beach dancer	
2004	You Got Served	Max	Credited as Robert James Hoffman III
2004	Dirty Dancing: Havana Nights	Dancer	
2005	I?	Older David	Short film
2005	Coach Carter	Dancer	
2005	Guess Who	Dancer	Credited as Robert James Hoffman III
2006	She's the Man	Justin Drayton	
2007	Shrooms	Bluto	
2007	National Lampoon's Bag Boy	Clyde "Windmill" Wynorski	
2008	The Onion Movie	"Lollipop Love" dancer	Credited as Robert James Hoffman III
2008	Step Up 2: The Streets	Chase Collins	
2009	Aliens in the Attic	Richard "Ricky" Dillman	
2010	BoyBand	Garth	
2010	Burning Palms	Chad Bower	
2011	Take Me Home Tonight	Tyler "Dance Machine" Jones	
2013	Life Life in in Space Space	General Kocklian	Short film
2014	Lap Dance	Kevin Shepherd	
2016	Amateur Night	Devon	

Television
Year	Title	Role	Notes
2003	American Dreams	Brian Wilson	Episode: "Where the Boys Are"
2004	Quintuplets	Matt	3 episodes
2005–07, 2020	Wild 'n Out	Himself	36 episodes; S1-4, 15
2006	America's Next Top Model	Himself	Episode: "The Girl with Two Bad Takes"
2006	Vanished	Adam Putnam	Main cast; 6 episodes
2006	CSI: Miami	Brad Hoffman	Episode: "Come as You Are"
2006	Campus Ladies	Evan	Episode: "Webcam"
2007	Nick Cannon Presents: Short Circuitz	Various	Season 1, episode 4
2009	Greek	Patrick Chambers	Episode: "Big Littles and Jumbo Shrimp"
2011	Drop Dead Diva	Brian Pullman	3 episodes
2011	Grey's Anatomy	Chad	Episode: "Love, Loss and Legacy"
2012	90210	Caleb Walsh	6 episodes
2014	The Night Shift	Thad Callahan	2 episodes

Web
Year	Title	Role	Notes
2008	The Jace Hall Show	Kinetsu Hayabusa	Episode: "Curt Schilling, and Wimbledon!!!"
2010	The Legend of Neil	Captain Lynel	2 episodes
2015	Epic Rap Battles of History	Deadpool	Episode: "Deadpool vs Boba Fett"; suit actor only

Video games
Year	Title	Role	Notes
2003	Pirates of the Caribbean: The Curse of the Black Pearl	Skeleton	Voice

== Awards ==
Year	Award	Category	Work	Result
2004	American Choreography Award	Outstanding Achievement in Choreography – Feature Film (shared with Dave Scott and Shane Sparks)	You Got Served	Won
2008	MTV Movie Awards	Best Kiss: (Shared with Briana Evigan)	Step Up 2: The Streets	Won
