= Janet MacLachlan =

American actress (1933–2010)

- Publicity photo of Janet McLachlan, taken in the late 1960s
- Born: Janet Angel MacLachlan; August 27, 1933; Harlem, New York City, U.S.
- Died: October 11, 2010 (aged 77); Los Angeles, California, U.S.
- Occupation: Actress
- Years active: 1965–2010
- Children: 1

Janet Angel MacLachlan (August 27, 1933 – October 11, 2010) was an American actress who had roles in such television series as The Rockford Files, The Invaders, All in the Family and The Golden Girls. She is best remembered for her key supporting part in the film Sounder (1972) where she portrayed Camille Johnson, a young teacher. MacLachlan worked with numerous well-known actors and actresses and celebrities such as Bill Cosby, Jim Brown, James Earl Jones, Maya Angelou and Morgan Freeman.

== Life and career ==
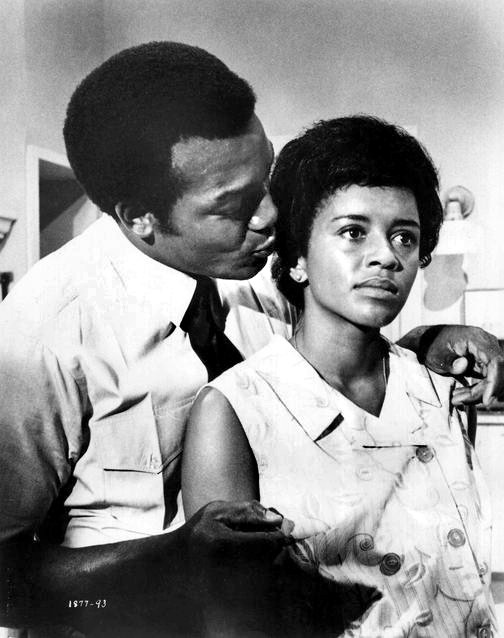
MacLachlan with Jim Brown in ...tick...tick...tick... - publicity still, 1970

MacLachlan was born in Harlem, New York City; her mother, Iris South MacLachlan, and father, James MacLachlan, were both Jamaican-born members of the Church of the Illumination. Attending P.S. 170 and Julia Ward Junior High School, MacLachlan graduated from Julia Richman High School in 1950. She received a bachelor's degree in psychology from Hunter College in 1955. She then worked as an executive secretary in New York City before turning to acting. She later performed at the Tyrone Guthrie Theatre in Minneapolis.

A one-time contract player for Universal Studios, MacLachlan made her debut in two episodes of The Alfred Hitchcock Hour in 1965. She appeared in episodes of The Fugitive, The Invaders episode "The Vise" as Mrs Baxter (1968), The Girl from U.N.C.L.E., Star Trek, Ironside, The Mary Tyler Moore Show, Wonder Woman and The Mod Squad. She also appeared in the films Uptight (1968), Change of Mind (1969), ...tick...tick...tick... (1970), Darker Than Amber (1970), Halls of Anger (1970), Sounder (1972), The Man (1972), Tightrope (1984), Murphy's Law (1986), The Boy Who Could Fly (1986) and The Thirteenth Floor (1999).

MacLachlan also won a Los Angeles-area Emmy for her performance in KCET's Voices of Our People: In Celebration of Black Poetry in 1981. She would later serve as grant committee chairman for the Academy of Motion Picture Arts and Sciences.

== Death ==
Suffering from cardiovascular disease in her later years, MacLachlan died from complications from the condition on October 11, 2010, at the age of 77 at Kaiser Permanente Medical Center in Los Angeles. MacLachlan resided in the Silver Lake neighborhood of Los Angeles.

== Filmography ==
Year	Title	Role	Notes
1967	Star Trek	Lieutenant Charlene Masters	Episode: "The Alternative Factor"; Season 1, Episode 27
1968	Uptight	Jeannie	
1969	Change of Mind	Elizabeth Dickson	
1969	The Mod Squad	Ann Gibbon	Episode: "To Linc, With Love"; Season 2 Episode 5
1970	...tick...tick...tick...	Mary Price	
1970	Halls of Anger	Lorraine Nash	
1970	Darker Than Amber	Noreen	
1972	The Man	Wanda	
1972	The Mary Tyler Moore Show	Sherry (Kris) Wilson	Episode: "His Two Right Arms"; Season 2, Episode 24
1972	Sounder	Camille Johnson	
1973	Maurie	Dorothy	
1975	The Rockford Files	Adrienne Clarke	Episode: "The Deep Blue Sleep"; Season 2, Episode 5
1975	S.W.A.T.	Cleo Kay	Episode : "Jungle War"; Season 1, Episode 6
1976	Ellery Queen	Corrine Ogden	Episode: "The Adventure of the Sunday Punch"; Season 1, Episode 13
1976	Barney Miller	Miss Jackson	Episode: "Werewolf'
1977	Wonder Woman	Sakri	Episode: "Judgment from Outer Space: Part 1"; Season 1, Episode 9
1978	Good Times	Sandra Forbes	Episode: "Florida Gets a Job"; Season 6, Episode 5
1978	Roll of Thunder, Hear My Cry	Mary Logan	
1979	All in the Family	Polly Lewis	Episode: "The Family Next Door"; Season 9, Episode 22
1982	Cagney & Lacey	Lynne Sutter	Episode: "Mr. Lonelyhearts"; Season 2, Episode 7
1984	Tightrope	Dr. Yarlofsky	
1986	Murphy's Law	Dr. Lovell	
1986	The Boy Who Could Fly	Mrs. D'Gregario	
1987	Big Shots	Welfare Worker	
1987	The Golden Girls	Sandra	Episode: "Old Friends"; Season 3, Episode 1
1988	For Keeps	Miss Giles	
1993	Heart and Souls	Agnes Miller	
1994	There Goes My Baby	Lottie	
1994	Criminal Passion	Tracy's Lawyer	
1994	In The Heat Of The Night	Nedda Losey	Episode: Who Was Geli Bendl?
1996	The Big Squeeze	Bank Manager	
1996	Pinocchio's Revenge	Judge Allen	
1999	The Thirteenth Floor	Ellen	
