= Snowbound: The Jim and Jennifer Stolpa Story =

- DVD cover
- Genre: Drama
- Written by: Jonathan Rintels
- Directed by: Christian Duguay
- Starring: Neil Patrick Harris; Kelli Williams
- Theme music composer: Lou Natale
- Country of origin: United States
- Original language: English

Production
- Executive producers: Howard Braunstein; Michael Jaffe
- Producers: Matthew O'Connor; Lisa Richardson
- Production locations: British Columbia, Canada
- Cinematography: Peter Woeste
- Editor: George Appleby
- Running time: 120 minutes
- Production companies: Jaffe/Braunstein Films; Pacific Motion Pictures; Spectacor Films

Original release
- Network: CBS
- Release: January 9, 1994

Snowbound: The Jim and Jennifer Stolpa Story is a 1994 American television film.

== Plot ==
Snowbound is based on a true story. Jim and Jennifer Stolpa and their infant son Clayton are 500 miles from their home in Castro Valley, California, when they lose their way and are stranded in an endless wilderness of deep snow near the ghost town of Vya, Nevada, east of Cedarville, California. They battle for survival against the elements when Jim Stolpa drives too far down a snow-covered road and gets stuck during a snowstorm. Using only meager supplies and resourcefulness, the young couple struggles to keep themselves and their son alive in a frozen shelter while awaiting rescue.

Realizing they will not be found and out of supplies, Jim ultimately strikes out on a courageous 50-mile walk through the snow alone, determined to reach help and return to save his family.

== Cast (in credits order) ==
- Neil Patrick Harris as Jim Stolpa
- Kelli Williams as Jennifer Wicker
- Richard Ian Cox as Jason Wicker, Jennifer's younger brother (as Richard Cox)
- Duncan Fraser as Don Patterson
- Susan Clark as Muriel Mulligan, Jim's mother
- Michael Gross as Kevin Mulligan, Jim's stepfather
- Andrew Airlie as Dr. Bonaldi
- Alexander and Zachary Ahnert as Clayton Stolpa
- Shannon and Heather Beaty as Megan Mulligan, Jim's younger half-sister
- Joy Coghill as Dr. Jorgenson
- Kevin McNulty as Joe Tirado
- Roger Barnes as Steve
- J.B. Bivens as Roadblock CHP
- Ken Camroux as Sergeant Satellite
- John B. Destry as Redinger
- Beverley Elliott as Terri
- Tina Gilbertson as Reporter
- Mitchell Kosterman as Deputy (as Mitch Kosterman)
- Catherine Lough Haggquist as Paramedic (as Catherine Lough)
- Randi Lynne as CHP Sergeant
- Walter Marsh as Sheriff Watkins
- Hrothgar Mathews as Rick Frazier
- Arlin McFarlane as Roberta Patterson
- Douglas Newell as Tommy
- Rick Poltaruk as Mechanic
- Phil Reimer as Weatherman
- Robert Toohey as Doug Farley
- Arnie Walters as Uncle Clay
- Shawn Webster as Weatherman
- Dale Wilson as Lt. Jack Reynolds
- Donna Yamamoto as Nurse

== Other versions of the story ==
Jim and Jennifer's story was also used as the plot for the "Lost in the Snow" episode of I Shouldn't Be Alive. The episode originally aired November 3, 2005, and featured Les Stroud analyzing the Stolpas' actions and showing the viewers how to be better prepared for such a situation.

The ordeal was the subject of the first episode of the third season of the ABC documentary series In an Instant titled "Whiteout" which first aired in June 2017.

The Stolpas' story was also told, along with survival tips, in "Snowbound with an Infant," episode one of season three of The Weather Channel show SOS: How to Survive, first airing August 11, 2019.
