= The Boy Who Could Fly =

1986 American film by Nick Castle

- Theatrical release poster
- Directed by: Nick Castle
- Written by: Nick Castle
- Produced by: Gary Adelson
- Starring: Jay Underwood; Lucy Deakins; Bonnie Bedelia; Fred Savage; Fred Gwynne; Colleen Dewhurst
- Cinematography: Adam Holender; Steven Poster
- Edited by: Patrick Kennedy
- Music by: Bruce Broughton
- Production company: Lorimar Motion Pictures
- Distributed by: 20th Century Fox
- Release date: August 15, 1986
- Running time: 109 minutes
- Country: United States
- Language: English
- Budget: $9-10 million
- Box office: $7.2 million

The Boy Who Could Fly is a 1986 American fantasy drama film written and directed by Nick Castle. It was produced by Lorimar Productions for 20th Century Fox, and released theatrically on August 15, 1986.

The film stars Lucy Deakins as 14-year-old Milly Michaelson, Jay Underwood as Eric Gibb, a boy with autism, Bonnie Bedelia as Milly's mother, Fred Savage as Milly's little brother, Colleen Dewhurst as a teacher, Fred Gwynne as Eric's uncle, Janet MacLachlan, and Mindy Cohn. After the suicide of her terminally ill father, Milly becomes friends with Eric, who lost both of his parents to a plane crash. Together, Eric and Milly find ways to cope with the loss and the pain as they escape to faraway places.

== Plot ==
Fourteen-year-old Amelia "Milly" Michaelson and her family move to a new suburban neighborhood shortly after the death of her father. Milly befriends her neighbor Geneva, while she and her younger brother Louis struggle to adjust to their new schools. Their mother, Charlene, is coping with a demotion at work and the stress of adapting to new technology. Meanwhile, Louis is harassed by local bullies who prevent him from riding around the block. On their first night in the house, Milly sees something strange fly past her window but finds nothing when she investigates.

Next door lives Eric Gibb, a nonverbal autistic boy cared for by his alcoholic uncle, Hugo. Eric displays unusual behavior, particularly a fixation on flying. Rumors say his parents died in a plane crash. One evening, Milly and her family witness Eric being restrained and placed in a straitjacket outside his home. Milly admits to Geneva that she finds Eric attractive, despite—or perhaps because of—his mysterious nature.

Though Eric does not communicate, he begins reacting to Milly. A neighbor, Mrs. Sherman, urges Milly to keep an eye on him, fearing that Hugo's neglect may lead to Eric being institutionalized. Milly gradually builds a connection with Eric over the school year, tracking his small but meaningful progress. One day, Eric catches a baseball just before it hits Milly, a breakthrough moment that deepens her belief that he is extraordinary.

Strange incidents continue, such as Eric appearing at her window without explanation. On a school field trip, Milly falls from a bridge and loses consciousness. In a dreamlike state, she imagines waking in a hospital where Eric communicates with her silently and confirms he can fly. They soar through the sky together, sharing a kiss among the clouds. But the dream turns dark, ending with her father's death and a vision that jolts her back to consciousness.

In the real hospital, Milly insists that Eric caught her mid-fall. A psychiatrist, Dr. Granada, offers a rational explanation, suggesting her belief in Eric's flight stems from unresolved grief over her father's secret battle with cancer and suicide. Back home, Milly finds a rose on her windowsill—the same one from her dream—strengthening her conviction that Eric can fly. She learns he has been taken by authorities after Hugo was found drunk again.

The family's attempts to visit Eric are denied. As Eric resists confinement, Louis faces more bullying, and their dog Max is hit by a car. One stormy night, Milly finds Eric hiding in her attic, soaked and shivering. He gives her a ring he's kept in a box, signaling his affection and trust.

The next day, Milly helps Eric escape. The two are chased to the roof of the school during a carnival. There, Eric speaks Milly's name—his first word—and confirms he can fly. Holding hands, they jump from the roof and begin to soar, astonishing the townspeople below. Eric returns Milly to her bedroom window, tells her he loves her, and disappears into the sky.

Though heartbroken, Milly understands why Eric had to leave. The town becomes flooded with media, scientists, and authorities seeking answers. Eric's belongings are confiscated, but his story inspires change: Hugo quits drinking and finds meaningful work, Max recovers, Louis outsmarts the bullies, and Charlene learns to use her computer. Milly, now more connected with those around her, gazes out her window, waiting for Eric's return. She releases a paper airplane into the sky as the sun sets, hopeful and changed.

== Cast ==
- Lucy Deakins as Amelia "Milly" Michaelson
- Jay Underwood as Eric Gibb
- Bonnie Bedelia as Charlene Michaelson
- Fred Savage as Louis Michaelson
- Colleen Dewhurst as Mrs. Carolyn Sherman
- Fred Gwynne as Uncle Hugo Gibb
- Janet MacLachlan as Mrs. D'Gregario
- Mindy Cohn as Geneva Goodman
- Jennifer Michas as Mona
- Michelle Bardeaux as Erin
- Aura Pithart as Colette
- Jason Priestley as Gary
- Cam Bancroft as Joe
- Chris Arnold as Sonny
- Dwight Koss as Donald Michaelson
- Louise Fletcher as Dr. Granada (billed "and special thanks to Louise Fletcher")
- Jake as Max the Dog

== Reception ==
On the review aggregator website Rotten Tomatoes, 62% of 34 critics' reviews are positive, with an average rating of 5.9/10. The site's consensus states: "Writer-director Nick Castle's careful command of tone keeps The Boy Who Could Fly from fully surrendering to its story's sentimental tendencies." Roger Ebert of the Chicago Sun-Times gave the film 3 out of 4 stars and wrote "Here is a sweet and innocent parable about a boy who could fly—and about a girl who could fly, too." Variety wrote "The Boy Who Could Fly is a well-intentioned film that deals with mental illness, suicide and other weighty subjects and their effects on children in a general and understanding way." Adding "Under Nick Castle's careful direction, scenes never become maudlin, which is remarkable considering the potential of the subject matter. Deakins and Underwood handle their difficult roles with amazing grace."

=== Box office ===
The movie debuted at No. 4.

== Soundtrack ==
The film's score was composed and conducted by Bruce Broughton. Varèse Sarabande released a re-recording of highlights in 1986 on LP and cassette (later reissued on compact disc as part of the Varese Encore line), performed by the Sinfonia of London and conducted by the composer; in 2002 Percepto released the film recordings of Broughton's music as a limited-edition promotional release. Intrada Records issued the complete score in 2015, including Stephen Bishop's "Walkin' On Air" (written and recorded for the film's end credits in lieu of Broughton's unused end title cue) and the brief song "Back Of The Bus" (written by screenwriter Nick Castle and Broughton).

The band The Coupe de Villes (composed of Nick Castle, horror director/composer/screenwriter/musician John Carpenter and director Tommy Lee Wallace) appear in a cameo on a television in a scene in the film playing their original song "Back on the Bus". The band is known today for their theme song "Big Trouble in Little China" for the movie with the same name directed by Carpenter, and their 1985 album Waiting out the Eighties.

=== 1986 Varèse Sarabande album ===
1. Main Title (2:36)
2. New Starts (3:51)
3. Millie's Science Project (3:09)
4. Family (2:57)
5. Flying (4:29)
6. Eric On The Roof (2:23)
7. Eric Agitated/Louis Defeated (3:55)
8. Millie And Eric Flee (3:45)
9. In The Air (4:31)
10. The Boy Who Could Fly (2:45)

=== 2002 Percepto album ===
1. Main Title/Meeting Eric (4:44)
2. Military Mission/New Neighbors (2:10)
3. Night (1:02)
4. Surprise Visit (1:23)
5. Eric On The Roof (2:24)
6. Milly's Science Project (3:33)
7. Heads Up (1:39)
8. Family (3:08)
9. The Field Trip (1:57)
10. The Hospital/Flying (7:37)
11. Returning Home (3:59)
12. Eric Agitated/Louis Defeated (4:16)
13. The Rainstorm/The Ring (6:40)
14. Milly & Eric Flee/Into The Air (9:01)
15. New Starts (4:14)
16. Milly Reflects (2:06)
17. The Boy Who Could Fly (3:02)

=== 2015 Intrada album ===
1. Main Title (4:45)
2. Louis Meets Hitler (1:00)
3. Louis’ Retreat (1:14)
4. Late! (First Hint - Revised) (1:04)
5. Eric On The Sill (0:28)
6. On Milly's Sill (1:24)
7. Eric On The Roof (2:25)
8. Milly's Science Project (3:34)
9. First Triumph (1:40)
10. Family (3:09)
11. The Rose/Flying (9:35)
12. Eric's Gone (4:00)
13. Eric Agitated (4:17)
14. Louis Gives Up (3:24)
15. The Ring (3:22)
16. Milly And Eric Flee/He Really Flies (9:01)
17. New Starts (4:15)
18. Milly Reflects/End Credits (Instrumental) (5:03)
19. Walkin’ On Air (End Credits) - Stephen Bishop (3:28)
20. First Hint (1:04)
21. Fireworks (From To Catch a Thief) - Lyn Murray, cond. Broughton (1:40)
22. Back Of The Bus - The Coupe De Villes (0:59)
23. Car Radio (2:16)

== In popular culture ==
The band Thrice released a song based on the film, titled "A Song for Milly Michaelson" on their 2007 LP The Alchemy Index Vols. III & IV.
