= Lucy Deakins =

American actress

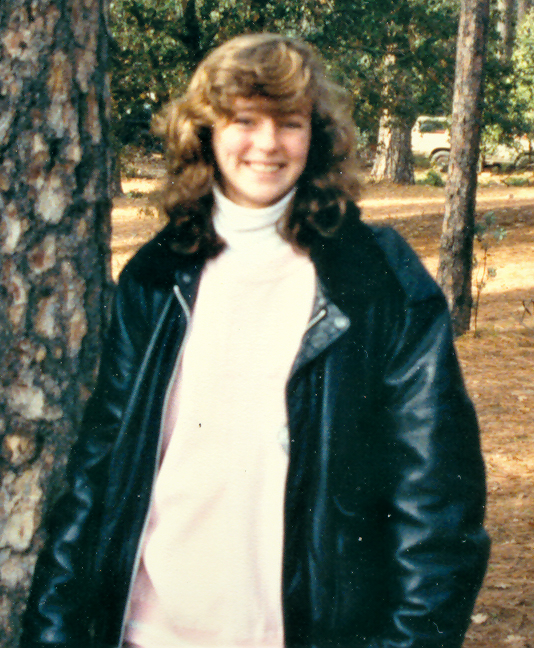
- Deakins on the set of The Great Outdoors in 1987.
- Born: December 18, 1971 (age 54); New York City, U.S.
- Education: Harvard University; University of Washington School of Law
- Occupations: Actress, attorney
- Years active: 1984–2002 (as an actress)
- Spouse: John Jay Arnold (1999–present)
- Children: 3

Lucy Helyn Deakins (born December 18, 1971) is an American attorney and former actress best known for starring as Milly in The Boy Who Could Fly and originating the role of Lily Walsh on As the World Turns.

== Biography ==
Deakins was born in New York City, the daughter of Alice, a professor at Columbia University, and Roger, a professor at New York University. She graduated from Stuyvesant High School and enrolled in Harvard University in 1988. She graduated in 1994 with a degree in comparative religion. She took time off from acting to backpack across Europe.

In 2007, she graduated from University of Washington School of Law and is now a practicing attorney in Denver, Colorado, specializing in energy law, and then moving to family law and criminal defense. She was a partner in the Denver law firm, Dunsing, Deakins & Galera. In 2013, she switched to handling appellate work and later opened her own law firm, the Law Office of Lucy Deakins.

== Filmography ==
=== Film ===
Year	Title	Role
1986	The Boy Who Could Fly	Amelia "Milly" Michaelson
1988	Little Nikita	Barbara Kerry
1988	The Great Outdoors	Cammie
1989	Cheetah	Susan Johnson
1994	There Goes My Baby	Mary Beth

=== Television ===
Year	Title	Role	Notes
1984–1985	As the World Turns	Lily Walsh	TV series
1990	ABC Afterschool Special	Becky Noonan	"Stood Up!"
1993	Law & Order	Julia Wood	"Discord"
1995	A Mother's Gift	Isobelle Deal (adult)	TV film
2002	Law & Order	Leah Stanton	"The Ring"

== Awards and nominations ==
Year	Award	Category	Title of work	Result
1986	Young Artist Award	Exceptional Performance by a Young Actress Starring in a Feature Film - Comedy or Drama	The Boy Who Could Fly	Nominated
1987	Saturn Award	Best Performance by a Younger Actor	The Boy Who Could Fly	Nominated
