= Cheetah (1989 film) =

1989 film by Jeff Blyth

- Theatrical release poster
- Directed by: Jeff Blyth
- Screenplay by: Erik Tarloff; John Cotter; Griff Du Rhone
- Story by: John Cotter
- Based on: The Cheetahs by Alan Caillou
- Produced by: Roy E. Disney; Robert Halmi, Sr.
- Starring: Keith Coogan; Lucy Deakins; Collin Mothupi; Timothy Landfield; Breon Gorman
- Cinematography: Thomas Burstyn
- Edited by: Eric Albertson
- Music by: Bruce Rowland
- Production companies: Walt Disney Pictures; Silver Screen Partners III
- Distributed by: Buena Vista Pictures Distribution
- Release date: August 18, 1989
- Running time: 83 minutes
- Country: United States
- Language: English
- Budget: $5 million
- Box office: $8,153,677 (United States)

Cheetah, also known as Cheetah and Friends, is a 1989 American family drama film from Walt Disney Pictures starring Keith Coogan and Lucy Deakins. This motion picture was loosely based on Alan Caillou's novel The Cheetahs. It was shot in Nairobi, Kenya. This motion picture features the phrase "Hakuna matata" which became famous when Disney released The Lion King five years later. It was first screened alongside a re-issue of the 1948 animated short, Mickey and the Seal.

== Plot ==
Los Angeles siblings Ted and Susan Johnson join their parents on a six-month vacation in Kenya where their father, Earl, works at a NASA tracking station, and their mother, Jean, works at a clinic. Although Jean forbids Ted and Susan from exploring, the pair sneak out to a nearby watering hole, where they meet a friendly Masai boy named Morogo. Morogo shows the siblings the wildlife of Kenya and they teach him how to play video games and sports. One day, their mother comes home to discover Morogo in her home and they convince their parents that Morogo will keep them safe, to which their parents reluctantly agree.

One day, after Morogo retrieves Ted and Susan's soccer ball from a sleeping rhino, Morogo's father, Kipoin scolds him for neglecting his goat herding duties. Morogo says that he will take care of his duties, but mentions that he has been learning new stuff from his friends. His father replies that he detests Morogo's new friends, because they are different. Later, the children comes across a female cheetah cub whose mother has been killed by a poacher and Susan decides that they should take the cub home as it is the only way for her to survive. After convincing their parents to keep the cheetah, they name her Duma and she becomes the household pet. Six months later, the Johnson parents convince the children to free Duma and train her to hunt according to the advice of a game warden named Larry before their vacation is over.

Meanwhile, an Indian storekeeper named B. Patel (who had unsuccessfully tried to buy Duma) hires two poachers named Abdullah and Nigel, who are planning to make a fortune out of Duma by exploiting her speed in the prolific sport of greyhound racing and betting against her. The night before Ted and Susan are to leave Kenya, Patel breaks into the Johnsons' house to steal Ted's whistle used to summon Duma and the three gamblers manage to capture Duma. The next morning, the Johnson family part ways with Morogo and stop at Patel's store for gasoline. After Patel accidentally reveals his whereabouts about Duma's disappearance to the children, Ted notices that a pattern on Abdullah's shoes resembles the shoe marks that he discovered when they adopted Duma, leading him to realize that Abdullah was the poacher who killed Duma's mother. Ted tries to inform his parents about Patel's conspiracy, but they dismiss his concerns. The two teenagers delay their flight after sending a telegram to their grandmother and learn from Patel's cousin that he is working in a secluded camp near a settlement called Jamhuri. The children try to convince Morogo to help them rescue Duma, but he states that his parents will not allow him, though he does gives them directions to Jamhuri through the Great Rift Valley. The next day, however, Morogo sneaks away as well and joins the two teenagers in their quest to find Duma.

Later, Morogo's parents have learned about their children's disappearances and inform the Johnson parents. Earl calls his mother, who informs him about the telegram the siblings sent to her. After the fathers interrogate Patel's cousin to reveal Patel's location, they call the police to search for their children and their wives insist on heading out to find the children themselves. Meanwhile, the children arrive at Abdullah's camp and sneak in at nightfall. Ted and Susan manage to locate Duma, but are captured by Abdullah and subsequently locked in a cage. While the poachers leave for the race in Nairobi, Morogo sneaks into the compound and manages to free the pair from their confinement.

On their way to Nairobi, the children are caught by a policeman searching for them. The children trick the policeman into letting them use the bathroom at a nearby gas station and they manage to escape. With the help of a shepherd, the children manage to reach Nairobi and arrive at the racetrack in time to hear the cheetah-greyhound race being announced. As the race progresses, Duma begins to tire and the greyhounds take the lead. Ted seizes his whistle from a security guard and blows it, prompting Duma to regain her burst of speed and win the race. While Patel and Nigel are forced to compensate all bets as a result of Duma's victory, both sets of parents arrive at the racetrack and reunite with the children. Duma rebels against Abdullah and attacks him until the children and parents arrive at the scene and pull her off of Abdullah. While both sets of parents berate their children for their disobedience, Abdullah is arrested.

The families arrive at Cheetah Valley to release Duma into the wild and they spot another cheetah in the distance. Ted refuses to extend their parents' proposal for the holiday and they try to release Duma, but Duma refuses to leave until the children tearfully order her to go away. The children quote a Kenyan adage by Morogo, "Though we are far apart, our spirits share the same earth and the same sky" as they happily watch Duma and her newfound friend frolicking.

== Cast ==
- Keith Coogan as Ted Johnson
- Lucy Deakins as Susan Johnson
- Collin Mothupi as Morogo
- Joe Herrington as Duma (vocalizations)
- Timothy Landfield as Earl Johnson
- Breon Gorman-Landfield as Jean Johnson
- Mhlangabezi Ka Vundla as Kipoin
- Lydia Kigada as Lani
- Kuldeep Bhakoo as Mr. B. Patel
- Paul Onsongo as Abdullah
- Anthony Baird as Nigel
- Rory McGuinness as Larry
- Rod Jacobsen as David
- David Adido as Mwangi
- Konga Mbandu as Police Captain
- Martin Okello as Friendly Policeman
- Allaudin Qureshi as Patel's Cousin
- William Tsuma as Cabbie
- Waigwa Wachira as Racetrack Policeman
- Jim Ward as Announcer
- Jan MacCoy as Stewardess
- Evalyne Kamau as Nyambura
- Jane Gelardi as Announcer's Girlfriend
- 'J.J.' Joseph Otieno Adamson as Blue Duka Band Member 1
- David Otieno as Blue Duka Band Member 2
- Wally Amalemba as Blue Duka Band Member 3
- Tony Evans Kalanzi as Blue Duka Band Member 4
- Kelly Harry Ngetsa as Blue Duka Band Member 5
- Thomas Akare as Bettor 1
- Denis Doughty as Bettor 2
- Siddik Ebrahim as Bettor 3
- Lee Harvin as Bettor 4
- Aloysius Lazarus as Greyhound Owner 1
- Njoroge Ngoima as Greyhound Owner 2
- Frank Turner as Greyhound Owner 3
- Richard Clarke as Announcer (voice)
- Michael Rogers as Racetrack Policeman (voice)

== See also ==
- List of American films of 1989
