= Burning Palms (film) =

2010 film by Christopher Landon

- Theatrical release poster
- Directed by: Christopher Landon
- Written by: Christopher Landon
- Produced by: Jason Hewitt; Christopher Landon; Oren Segal
- Starring: Adriana Barraza; Lake Bell; Jamie Chung; Shannen Doherty; Robert Hoffman; Rosamund Pike; Peter Macdissi; Dylan McDermott; Anson Mount; Jon Polito; Zoe Saldana; Nick Stahl; Paz Vega
- Cinematography: Seamus Tierney
- Edited by: Gregory Plotkin
- Music by: Matthew Margeson
- Production company: Films in Motion
- Distributed by: New Films International
- Release dates: April 23, 2010 (Newport Beach); January 14, 2011 (United States)
- Country: United States
- Language: English
- Budget: $5 million
- Box office: $3.2 million

Burning Palms is a 2010 American satirical thriller film written and directed by Christopher Landon (in his feature directorial debut) based on Los Angeles stereotypes told through five intertwining storylines.

The segments are based on popular stereotypes of West Hollywood, Santa Monica, Sherman Oaks, Westwood and Holmby Hills. Each of the characters in the film confronts taboos and an uncertain, often darkly humorous, fate. Producer Oren Segal likens the film to "a John Waters version of Short Cuts", a 1993 drama film directed by Robert Altman.

The film was released in the United States on January 14, 2011, by New Films International. It received negative reviews from critics.

== Plot ==
The Green-Eyed Monster

Dedra Davenport meets Chloe, the 15-year-old daughter of her fiancé Dennis for the very first time. However, she is soon disturbed by how close father and daughter are, committing suicide by cutting her veins just like Chloe's mother, feeling herself shut out and betrayed by the unhealthily close and bordering on incestuous relationship between the two.

This Little Piggy

Ginny Bai agrees to participate in an unconventional sex act with her boyfriend Chad Bower. Soon after she begins to slowly lose her mind when she cannot seem to get rid of an odd smell from her finger.

Buyer's Remorse

A rich and well-recognized West Hollywood gay couple decide to adopt a seven-year-old African girl. They prove to be unprepared for the challenges and risks involved in parenthood, especially since she is a decided mute who refuses to speak to them, and eventually abandon her.

Kangaroo Court

A group of bullying, bratty boys, cared for by an irresponsible nanny are puzzled by their maid (Paz Vega) keeping the umbilical cord of her dead child and eventually discover that the maid murdered her own child to punish her boyfriend for infidelity.

Maneater

An unidentified man breaks into the apartment of meek woman Sarah Cotton and rapes her. Sometime later, she finds the man's wallet and is able to track him down and approaches him, wanting him to rape her again.

== Cast ==
- Zoe Saldana as Sarah Cotton
- Jamie Chung as Ginny Bai
- Dylan McDermott as Dennis Marx
- Rosamund Pike as Dedra Davenport
- Lake Bell as Maryjane
- Nick Stahl as Robert Kane
- Paz Vega as Blanca Juarez
- Adriana Barraza as Luisa Alvarez
- Shannen Doherty as Dr. Shelly
- Robert Hoffman as Chad Bower
- Peter Macdissi as Geri
- Anson Mount as Tom
- Emily Meade as Chloe Marx
- Jon Polito as The Pharmacist
- Victor Webster as Paulo
- Dimitri Diatchenko as Bob
- Colleen Camp as Barbara Barish
- Tom Wright as Maxwell Barron
- Austin Williams as Nicholas Pinter
- Chandler George Brown as Jeffrey

== Production ==
Palms was scripted by Christopher Landon, who also wrote the 2007 thriller Disturbia. Palms also marks Landon's directorial debut.

Media outlets such as The Hollywood Reporter and Digital Spy reported that the ensemble-driven indie feature would star Shannen Doherty and Dylan McDermott as well as Zoe Saldaña, Lake Bell, Nick Stahl, Paz Vega, Adriana Barraza, Colleen Camp, Jamie Chung, Robert Hoffman, Peter Macdissi, Emily Meade, Anson Mount, Rosamund Pike, Austin Williams, Chandler George Brown, and Tom Wright.

The film was shot in Los Angeles and Baton Rouge, Louisiana. Oren Segal, Steven Prince and Jason Hewitt produced the film, and Tyler Thompson, Vince Morella and Naz Jafri were executive producers.

== Reception ==
To date, the critical reception for the film has been largely negative. One critic described the film as being "one of the most offensive movies I've seen in the past decade", going on to say:

If there's a legitimate point to this film, then I missed it. I was distracted by how 'in your face' the story was at all times, all but begging us to be offended by its crassness and politically incorrect content. Watching this film is a miserable experience, and almost all of the characters are despicable. Even the ones we're supposed to care about are incredibly annoying.

Andrew Schenker of Slant magazine gave the film just half of one star out of a possible four. Writing of the film:

Landon's deeply cynical method is to conjure up the most aberrant corners of humanity and then wallow around in his self-created muck looking to scavenge what little scraps of humor he can find.

Gabe Callahan, of Poptimal.com, pointed out his theories as to why the film was such a disappointment:

Burning Palms has a lack of focus climatically as each story limps to their anti-climatic reveals.… For Landon’s directorial debut, Burning Palms is a movie that threatens to leave no taboo unexplored but the film seemed scared and hesitant of its own subject matter, and never takes the plunge into the deep end of dark and satirical film-making. In this way the movie fails. The shocking parts are predictable, the funny parts fall flat, and the satire is non-existent. That is the core of the problem with Burning Palms: there is a fine line between satire and stereotypes. The film doesn't seem aware of this line as it tries its hardest to make a point about stereotypes and taboos. It fails miserably at making this point and just ends up being misogynistic and naïve. I would have loved to have been shocked and disturbed. Instead I had to settle for disappointed.

Peter Debruge also denounced the film in Variety:

The most shocking thing about attention-seeking satire Burning Palms isn't its irreverent treatment of incest, shame, same-sex parenting and rape, but rather how little impact any of these elements have on the audience. Making his directorial debut, screenwriter Christopher B. Landon struggles so mightily to offend that he forgets to supply a rooting interest in his characters."

As of June 2020, the film holds a 38% approval rating on Rotten Tomatoes, based on eight reviews with an average rating of 4.56/10. On Metacritic, the film holds a score of 33 out of 100, based on five reviews, indicating "generally unfavorable" reviews.
