= Robin Pearson Rose =

American film and TV actress

Robin Pearson Rose is an American film and television actress.

== Filmography ==
=== Film ===
Year	Title	Role	Notes
1978	An Enemy of the People	Petra Stockmann	
1986	Last Resort	Sheila Lollar	
1990	Ghost Dad	Hospital Administrator	
1993	Fearless	Sarah	
1994	Speechless	Teacher	
2000	What Women Want	Kitchen Secretary	
2003	Something's Gotta Give	Hamptons Nurse	
2014	Annabelle	Mother	

=== Television ===
Year	Title	Role	Notes
1976	The Adams Chronicles	Polly Jefferson	Episode: "Chapter V: John Adams, Vice President"
1978–1980	The White Shadow	Katie Donahue	9 episodes
1979	...and Your Name Is Jonah	Kate	Television film
1982	Trapper John, M.D.	Meal Carrier	Episode: "Angel of Mercy"
1982	Hart to Hart	Susan	Episode: "Harts and Fraud"
1983	Starflight: The Plane That Couldn't Land	Linda	Television film
1983	The Jeffersons	Heather	Episode: "I Do, I Don't"
1985	I Had Three Wives	Francie	Episode: "Til Death Do Us Part"
1986	CBS Schoolbreak Special	Diane Miller	Episode: "Have You Tried Talking to Patty?"
1986	MacGyver	Suzanne / Susan	2 episodes
1986	Killer in the Mirror	Samantha's maid	Television film
1986	The Magical World of Disney	Jason's Mother	Episode: "Little Spies"
1987	Sidekicks	Connie	Episode: "The Boy Who Saw Too Much"
1987	Newhart	Stratford Inn Guest	Episode: "Night Moves"
1987	Second Chance	Older Jane Pfeiffer	Episode: "Plain Jane"
1987-1989	The Days and Nights of Molly Dodd	Robin	2 episodes
1988	Promised a Miracle	Beth	Television film
1988-1992	Empty Nest	Diane / Mrs. Fogal	2 episodes
1989	Brothers	Gracie	Episode: "Nanny from Heaven"
1989	Mancuso, F.B.I.	Sarah	Episode: "Betrayal"
1990–1992	L.A. Law	ADA Martha Peters	3 episodes
1991	Lucy & Desi: Before the Laughter	Vivian Vance	Television film
1991, 1992	Night Court	P.J. Sparks	2 episodes
1993	Full Eclipse	Therapist	Television film
1994	Secret Sins of the Father	Dr. Gericka	Television film
1994	A Place for Annie	Edna	Television film
1994	Party of Five	Dr. Weeks	Episode: "Kiss Me Kate"
1995	ER	Lois	Episode: "Make of Two Hearts"
1996	The Faculty	Renee	Episode: "Somewhere There's Music"
1996	The Single Guy	News Reporter	Episode: "Best Man"
1997	7th Heaven	Laura Cunningham	Episode: "With a Little Help from My Friends"
1997	On the Line	Wild-Eyed Woman	Television film
1999	Judging Amy	Mrs. Spellman	Episode: "Trial by Jury"
2003	Boston Public	Mrs. Harrower	Episode: "Chapter Fifty-Five"
2003	NYPD Blue	Dr. Ellen Lang	Episode: "Yo, Adrian"
2004	Without a Trace	Lorraine Prince	Episode: "The Line"
2005–2019	Grey's Anatomy	Patricia Murphy	14 episodes
2006	Night Stalker	Mrs. Owens	Episode: "Timeless"
2006	The Nine	Lydia Martel	Episode: "Take Me Instead"
2006	Vanished	Mrs. Jerome	6 episodes
2007	Close to Home	Doris Johnson	Episode: "Barren"
2007	Boston Legal	Janet Fleming	Episode: "The Good Lawyer"
2007	Cold Case	Elizabeth Karlsen	Episode: "Stand Up and Holler"
2007	Life	Sweet Married Woman	Episode: "The Fallen Woman"
2010	NCIS	Clea's Mother	Episode: "Cracked"
2011	Enlightened	Bunnie	Episode: "The Weekend"
2011	Prime Suspect	Veterinarian	Episode: "Shame"
2012	Mad Men	Alice Geiger	2 episodes
2015	Justified	Homeowner #1	Episode: "Cash Game"
