= Hunk (film) =

1987 film by Lawrence Bassoff

- DVD cover
- Directed by: Lawrence Bassoff
- Written by: Lawrence Bassoff
- Produced by: Marilyn Jacobs Tenser
- Starring: John Allen Nelson; Steve Levitt; James Coco
- Cinematography: Bryan England
- Edited by: Richard E. Westover
- Music by: David Kurtz
- Production company: Marimark Productions
- Distributed by: Crown International Pictures
- Release date: March 6, 1987
- Running time: 102 minutes
- Country: United States
- Language: English
- Box office: $1,749,956 (US) USD

Hunk is a 1987 American comedy film directed by Lawrence Bassoff, and starring John Allen Nelson, Steve Levitt, James Coco and Deborah Shelton. The plot concerns a man, Bradley Brinkman, who signs an agreement with an agent of the devil, which grants him a transformed body and a new identity, Hunk Golden. He must decide whether to continue living in this new body or return to his old one.

== Synopsis ==
After his girlfriend elopes with her aerobics instructor, Bradley Brinkman (Steve Levitt) spends so much time daydreaming of being a confident, sexy, and powerful man that he is about to lose his job. While desperately trying to meet a deadline he types, "I'd sell my soul for a money making program," into the computer. The computer prints "The Yuppie Program", which becomes hugely popular and gains him a large bonus and a paid summer off to write anything he wants.

Bradley spends his entire bonus renting a run-down beach house in a very high-end part of California coastline. He first sees O'Brien (Deborah Shelton), the devil's agent, while taking a walk on the beach with his new neighbor Chachka (Cynthia Szigeti), who introduces him to his highly stuck-up yuppie neighbors who verbally and physically abuse him. His further attempts to socialize with his neighbors and live a rich yuppie lifestyle are mocked and when he throws a house party that no one else comes to, O'Brien appears again and explains that she occupied his computer and wrote the Yuppie Program for him.

She offers to make him a "hunk", the kind of man women want and men want to be, in exchange for his soul. This includes a "sell your soul for the summer" trial, where he can get his previous body and his soul refunded if he is not satisfied with the deal. Without really taking it seriously, he signs the contract. He wakes up the next day as Hunk Golden (John Allen Nelson), in a transformed body. After a day, O'Brien steps in and actively helps him become his new persona. As Hunk Golden he is a natural martial arts master, can eat anything and not gain weight, drink without getting drunk, has self-cleaning teeth and unbreakable bones. Women flock to have sex with him. He sets fashion trends. As the deadline to finalize the deal (Labor Day) approaches, Hunk seeks help from a psychiatrist, Dr. Sunny Graves, (Rebeccah Bush), to try and save his old soul and body. She tells him to embrace being the hunk that he is, while she helps him with his apparent delusion of being Bradley Brinkman.

After another night of sex with a random woman, O'Brien introduces Hunk to the chairman of the board of the Devil Himself Incorporated, Dr. D (James Coco), currently in the form of Atilla the Hun. Hunk notices that he also looks like Captain Kravitz, the former owner of the beach house. He tells Hunk there is a vast demon shortage and Dr. D plans to have him working with some of the worst killers in history, like Ivan the Terrible, Jack the Ripper and Benito Mussolini. After Dr. D leaves, O'Brien romanticizes the two of them bombing Pearl Harbor together as a pair of time-traveling Satanic salespeople.

While at the beachfront with Sunny, a drunk television host Garrison Gaylord (Robert Morse) is about to hit them and drive his Jeep off the pier when Hunk turns and stops it with his bare hands. Gaylord's television director (J. Jay Saunders) catches the entire incident on film and Hunk becomes an instant celebrity. Sunny and Hunk kiss, but after he leaves Dr. D appears in Sunny's office, dressed as Adolf Hitler. Sunny is revealed to be O'Brien. Dr. D chastises her for falling in love with another client. He warns her that her own deal is coming due, and if she does not deliver Bradley's soul, she will be reverted to who she formerly was.

Hunk struggles with changes in his personality, leading him to turn a garden hose on his fans in rage. Hunk dreams about Bradley escaping from hell and warning him not to take the deal, and later of helping Dr. D start World War III. Finally, Bradley and Sunny meet with Dr. D, and Bradley chooses to give up being Hunk and not take the deal. Dr. D reveals the truth about Sunny, and offers them both a 6-months extension on their contracts. Bradley refuses and finally convinces O'Brien to do the same. She is reverted into her original self, a 10th Century princess who sold her soul to avoid a Viking marriage her father sold her into, which inspires Bradley to create the Princess Program.

== Cast ==
- John Allen Nelson ... Hunk Golden
- Steve Levitt ... Bradley Brinkman
- Deborah Shelton ... O'Brien
- James Coco ... Dr. D
- Rebeccah Bush ... Dr. Sunny Graves
- Cynthia Szigeti ... Chachka
- Hilary Shepard Turner ... Alexis Cash
- Avery Schreiber ... Constatine Constapopolis
- Robert Morse ... Garrison Gaylord
- J. Jay Saunders ... Director

== Notes ==
- James Coco, who plays Dr. D, died days before the film was released.
- Brad Pitt appeared as a background extra in one scene, the first of several uncredited parts Pitt had in 1987. Based on the release date, the film marks his first film role.

== Soundtrack ==
- "Real Man", "Don't Stop", Music and lyrics, by John Baer; Sung by Mendy Lee; Produced and arranged by John Baer.
- "Destiny", Music and lyrics, by John Baer; Robbie Baer, Mendy Lee and Candy Chase; Produced and arranged by John Baer.
- "Take a Second Look", Music by David Kurtz, Lyrics by Monday, Sung by Jolie Jones and Donny Gerrard, Produced by David Kurtz.

== See also ==
- List of American films of 1987
