= Shannon Wilcox =

American actress (1943–2023)

- Born: Mary Kay Wilcox; May 21, 1943; Cleveland, Ohio, U.S.
- Died: September 2, 2023 (aged 80); Los Angeles, California, U.S.
- Occupation: Actress
- Notable work: The Border; Songwriter; Buck James
- Spouses: John Williams (m. 1965; div. 1984) Alex Rocco (m. 2005; died 2015)
- Children: 2 (including Kelli Williams)

Shannon Wilcox (May 21, 1943 – September 2, 2023) was an American character actress. She was known for her roles in the films The Border (1982), Songwriter (1984), and Frankie and Johnny (1991), and the series Buck James (1987–1988).

== Personal life and death ==
Wilcox was born in Ohio on May 21, 1943, and was raised on an Indiana farm. She was married to John Williams, a plastic surgeon, from 1965 until their divorce in 1984. She was married to actor Alex Rocco from 2005 until his death in 2015. Her two children are Sean Doyle and Kelli Williams. Wilcox died in Los Angeles on September 2, 2023, at the age of 80.

== Filmography ==
=== Film ===
Year	Title	Role	Notes
1980	Cheaper to Keep Her	Nora	
1982	The Border	Savannah	
1982	Six Weeks	Peg Dalton	
1984	The Karate Kid	Mrs. Mills	Uncredited
1984	Songwriter	Anita	
1986	Legal Eagles	Mrs. Williams	
1990	Zapped Again!	Kevin's Mom	Direct-to-video
1991	Frankie and Johnny	Christine the Hooker	
1991	For the Boys	Margaret Sparks	
1994	There Goes My Baby	Mattie	
1994	Criminal Passion	Joanne Pinder	
1994	Exit to Eden	Mary	
1995	Seven	Woman Cop Behind Desk	
1996	Dear God	Madame Zeus	
1999	The Other Sister	Danny's Mom Ruthie	
1999	Runaway Bride	Luau Lady	
1999	The Annihilation of Fish	Hippie Preacher's Wife	
2001	The Princess Diaries	Ball Reporter	
2004	Raising Helen	Photographer	
2004	The Princess Diaries 2: Royal Engagement	Lady Salsa	
2009	Ready or Not	Don Julio's Lady	Also executive producer
2014	Scammerhead	Imby Sarnus	
2015	The Atticus Institute	Patricia West	
2017	The Neighborhood	Catherina Donatello	

=== Television ===
Year	Title	Role	Notes
1976–1977	Starsky & Hutch	Policewoman/Laura Lonigan	2 episodes
1977	Dog and Cat	Janice	Episode: "Dead Skunk"
1978	Hawaii Five-O	Andrea King	Episode: "The Silk Trap"
1978	Kaz	Karen	Episode: "No Way to Treat the Lady"
1979	Family	Marilyn	Episode: "The Friend's Affair"
1979	Hart to Hart	Ellie Duggan	Episode: "Murder Between Friends"
1979	Mrs. Columbo	Claire	Episode: "Feelings Can Be Murder"
1982–1986	Remington Steele	Mrs. Tuttle/Charlotte Knight	2 episodes
1984	Cagney & Lacey	Mrs. McKenna	Episode: "Out of Control"
1985	Magnum, P.I.	Diana Franklin/Holly Berry	Episode: "A Pretty Good Dancing Chicken"
1986–1993	Matlock	Sarah Kerns/Marsha Barnes	2 episodes
1986–1994	L.A. Law	Lydia Graham/Judy Rudolph	2 episodes
1987	Tales from the Darkside	Ruth Cooley	Episode: "The Milkman Cometh"
1987–1988	Buck James	Jenny James	19 episodes
1988	1st & Ten	Brenda	Episode: "Out of the Past"
1989	Alien Nation	Charlotte Brontë	Episode: "Little Lost Lamb"
1990	Jake and the Fatman	Leonora Wilkerson	Episode: "In the Still of the Night"
1990	Dangerous Passion	Janet Gregson	TV film
1990	Dallas	Anita	5 episodes
1993	In the Heat of the Night	Libby Deschamps	2 episodes
1993	Angel Falls	Rowena Dare	Episode: "Fall from Grace"
1997	Beyond Belief: Fact or Fiction	Margaret	Episode: "The Apparition/The Electric Chair/On the Road/Number One with a Bullet/Dream House"
2002	Boston Public	Nancy	Episode: "Chapter Fifty-Two"
2004	ER	Connie Martin	Episode: "Forgive and Forget"
2004	A Boyfriend for Christmas	Joanna Grant	TV film
2011	NCIS	Mrs. Roach	Episode: "Enemy on the Hill"
2016	NCIS: Los Angeles	Summer	Episode: "The Queen's Gambit"
2018	The Romanoffs	Natalie	Episode: "The Royal We"
2019	The Resident	Donna Jackson	Episode: "Snowed In"
2020	Grey's Anatomy	Irene Sholman	Episode: "Save the Last Dance for Me"
