= Aliens in the Attic =

2009 film by John Schultz

- Theatrical release poster
- Directed by: John Schultz
- Screenplay by: Mark Burton; Adam F. Goldberg
- Story by: Mark Burton
- Produced by: Barry Josephson
- Starring: Carter Jenkins; Austin Butler; Kevin Nealon; Robert Hoffman; Doris Roberts; Tim Meadows; Ashley Tisdale
- Cinematography: Don Burgess
- Edited by: John Pace
- Music by: John Debney
- Production companies: Dune Entertainment; Regency Enterprises; Josephson Entertainment
- Distributed by: 20th Century Fox
- Release date: July 31, 2009 (United States)
- Running time: 86 minutes
- Country: United States
- Language: English
- Budget: $45 million
- Box office: $59.6 million

Aliens in the Attic is a 2009 American science fiction comedy film directed by John Schultz from a screenplay by Mark Burton and Adam F. Goldberg, based on a story conceived by Burton. Starring Carter Jenkins, Austin Butler, Ashley Tisdale, Kevin Nealon, Robert Hoffman, Gillian Vigman, Andy Richter, Doris Roberts, and Tim Meadows, and features the voices of Josh Peck, J.K. Simmons, Thomas Haden Church, and Kari Wahlgren, the plot revolves around the children in the Pearson family defending their vacation home against a group of aliens, who are planning an invasion of Earth until one of the aliens betrays them and joins the Pearson children in battle.

Produced by Regency Enterprises and Dune Entertainment, Aliens in the Attic was released theatrically by 20th Century Fox on July 31, 2009, in the United States. The film received mixed reviews from critics and grossed $59.6 million on a $45 million budget.

== Plot ==
A meteor shower rockets through the dark galaxy, and four glowing pods are seen hiding behind the meteor shower. Suddenly the four glowing pods makes a hard right and heads towards a distant planet Earth.

In a Chicago suburb, Stuart Pearson and his wife Nina head a family that includes 7-year-old Hannah, 17-year-old Bethany, who sneaks out with her boyfriend Ricky Dillman, and 15-year-old techno-geek Tom. Tired of being bullied for being smart, Tom fails his classes to appease his peers but gets caught hacking into his school's website to change his grades. Stuart decides to take the family to a lakeside holiday home in Creek Landing, Michigan. Joining them is Stuart's immature divorced brother Nathan "Nate" Pearson, his 14-year-old show off son Jake, identical 12-year-old gamer twins Art and Lee, and Stuart and Nate's mother, Nana "Rose" Pearson. Ricky also arrives unexpectedly and talks his way into staying overnight, by giving them the impression that his car broke down so he can spend time with Bethany.

As the family settles in, a dark storm clouds swirl around the house and four glowing pods land themselves on the roof. A crew of little green aliens emerges, consisting of Skip, a nasty and tough commander, Tazer, an ugly muscle-bound soldier armed to the teeth, Razor, a lethal, violent female soldier, and Sparks, a four-armed engineer and the only non-threatening member. Since the aliens crashed into the satellite dish, Ricky and Tom are sent to fix it. In the attic, Ricky then reveals to Tom that he lied about his car breaking down and being 18. Ricky is actually a college student and four years older than Bethany. Ricky sends Tom to fix the satellite dish by himself, but it is beyond repair. Investigating further, Tom and Jake discover the aliens. Ricky is shot by Tazer with a dart-like "mind control plug", allowing the aliens to control him via remote.

Called "Zirkonians", the aliens plan to take over Earth and make Ricky attack the boys, but Tom and Jake manage to escape with Hannah and the twins' help. Tazer shoots both Tom and Jake with mind control plugs, but they fall off harmlessly, as they are revealed to only work on adults, much to the annoyance of Skip. The group calls 911, but sheriff Doug Armstrong doesn't believe them and scolds them while the aliens cut the phone wire. The kids decide to protect the adults by keeping the aliens' existence a secret. Tom creates a potato gun and the kids repel the first alien attack from the attic. In the process, they obtain Ricky's controller and turn him against the aliens. The mind-controlled Ricky's actions begin to tear apart his relationship with Bethany.

The kids orchestrate a scheme to get the adults out of the house and then ambush the aliens using firecrackers as they try to reach the basement via the air vents, gentle and non-violent Sparks gets separated from the group and ends up in Hannah's room, where the latter befriends him and he reveals that he wants to return to his family. Sparks helps the kids by creating weapons for them and reveals his teammates are seeking the "Sizematron", an enlarging machine buried under the basement for many years that will allow the Zirkonians to invade the planet. The kids' grandmother is mind controlled by the aliens, giving her superhuman strength and agility. After another brief battle, during which the sheriff arrives outside the house, Razor and Tazer capture the suitcase they believe to be containing Sparks, and the kids capture Skip in a box, which they bring downstairs to talk to the sheriff. He asks to see what's in the box, however the adults' arrival distract him, and they invite him to dinner. Meanwhile, Jake prevents Tazer from shooting a mind-control plug at the sheriff from the roof, and is led back to the attic where he is captured by Tazer and Razor.

At dinner, Skip escapes from the box and takes Ricky's controller and Hannah's bag with Sparks inside. Nana, under the twins' control, defeats Ricky (back under alien control) similar to a fighting video game. However, the aliens capture Sparks, whom they need to complete their mission, while Bethany discovers the aliens. While rescuing Jake in the basement, Ricky insults Tom and the others and breaks up with Bethany, revealing his true colors. The kids attack the aliens and rescue Sparks, however, Skip successfully uses the Sizematron, growing 30 feet tall and summoning the Zirkonian invasion ships with beacons. The kids use the mind-control darts against the aliens, controlling Skip and sending him and a grown Tazer back to the machine to shrink them to regular size. Tazer and Razor flee, while Skip is sucked into the damaged machine, which explodes. Sparks calls off the invasion and returns home after bidding farewell to the kids. Having grown closer, the kids resume their vacation to enjoy a day of fishing with their parents, while Skip, having survived the explosion yet shrunk to an even smaller size, reappears and bent on revenge, only to be snatched away by a crow.

In the mid-credits scene, Bethany and Tom use the mind-control remote to make Ricky (still under the plug’s influence) act weirdly in front of his new girlfriend, Annie Filkins, and her friends out of revenge. After Ricky lands on his testicles on the stair railing while dancing uncontrollably, Bethany gleefully comments that she is "so keeping this", and Annie abandons Ricky as a form of insult to injury.

== Cast ==
- Carter Jenkins as Thomas "Tom" Pearson
- Austin Butler as Jake Pearson
- Ashley Tisdale as Bethany Pearson
- Ashley Boettcher as Hannah Pearson
- Robert Hoffman as Richard "Ricky" Dillman
- Henri Young as Art Pearson
- Regan Young as Lee Pearson
- Kevin Nealon as Stuart "Stu" Pearson
- Gillian Vigman as Nina Pearson
- Andy Richter as Nate Pearson
- Doris Roberts as Nana Rose Pearson
- Tim Meadows as Sheriff Doug Armstrong
- Malese Jow as Julie
- Megan Parker as Brooke
- Maggie VandenBerghe as Annie Filkins

=== Voice cast ===
- Josh Peck as Sparks
- J. K. Simmons as Skip
- Thomas Haden Church as Tazer
- Kari Wahlgren as Razor

== Production ==
=== Development ===
In March 2006, 20th Century Fox announced that they picked up Mark Burton and Adam F. Goldberg's script for the film, then titled They Came from Upstairs. Marc Resteghini was hired to oversee the film for Fox with Kara Francis Smith for Regency Enterprises. Barry Josephson was confirmed as the main producer for the film while Thor Freudenthal was initially hired to direct the film, but was later replaced by John Schultz. Pre-production on the film began in March 2007.

In January 2008, Ashley Tisdale was cast in the film as Bethany Pearson; Robert Hoffman, Carter Jenkins and Austin Butler were later cast as well. Doris Roberts signed onto the film in February 2008. MTV later confirmed that Josh Peck joined the cast as the voice of the alien Sparks. Tisdale recorded a song titled "Switch" for the film, which was written by Kate Akhurst and Vince Pizzinga to reflect the inconsistent relationship between Tisdale's character Bethany Pearson and boyfriend Ricky Dillman who falls victim to mind-control, although Tisdale did have a role in editing the lyrics to further reflect the metaphor. The song was also included in Tisdale's second album, Guilty Pleasure. The original motion picture soundtrack by John Debney was released on August 18, 2009.

=== Filming ===
Principal photography began at the end of January 2008 in Auckland, New Zealand. Auckland-based production company New Upstairs Productions stated that filming would run for 30–40 days from January 28 to April 18, 2008, with no filming in weekends. The film was shot predominantly in a 1915 villa which had been transported from Remuera to rural North Auckland in 1997. Filmmakers reportedly spent $700,000 restoring the house. Principal photography ended in mid-March 2008, though Tisdale, Butler and Jenkins returned to the set for reshoots in April 2009.

== Release ==
Aliens in the Attic was originally scheduled to be released in January 2009, but was pushed back to July 31, 2009. The United Kingdom release also coincided with a charity auction for Save the Children which teamed up with eBay and 20th Century Fox where various celebrities, including several actors from the film, sold items from their attics to raise money for the charity.

=== Home media ===
The film was released on DVD and Blu-ray on November 3, 2009.

== Reception ==
=== Critical response ===
On Rotten Tomatoes, the film holds a 34% rating based on 70 reviews with an average critical score of 4.6/10, with the site's consensus stating: "Inoffensive and kid-friendly, this mundane family comedy is light on imagination." On Metacritic, the film has an average score of 42 out of 100 based on 10 reviews, indicating "mixed or average" reviews. Audiences polled by CinemaScore gave the film an average grade of "B+" on an A+ to F scale.

Entertainment Weekly described the film as "a pointless and harmless family adventure that doesn't mentally assault the 12-and-over set and looks like a lot of fun", while San Francisco Chronicle called it unoriginal and crowd pleasing. Variety stated the film would appeal primarily to a more narrow demographic of tweens and preteens and despite Tisdale's presence, it's difficult to imagine many ticket buyers between the ages of 12 and 18 while The New York Times described Jenkins and Butler as the actors with more personality and Hoffman as the actor who provides the film's occasional funny moments and stated that even though she is credited as one of the main characters, Tisdale spends most of the film off-screen.

The Los Angeles Times called the film "an enjoyable kid-friendly film but not an out-of-this-world classic" and also mentioned the film belonged to Hoffman, and Kirk Honeycutt of The Hollywood Reporter said director John Schultz "played everything for laughs and earns a more than a few but tech effects deliver a fair number of those laughs" and described the film as an "amusing family comedy". Radio Times gave the film a three out of five stars rating, saying that the film is "a thrilling children's yarn with enough pop-culture references to hold grown-ups' interest".

The Dove Foundation praised the film, saying it is "one of those movies that you find to be better than anticipated" and also said the film draws on realism in family dynamics. Lara Martin of Digital Spy described the film as a "kid-friendly mix of Men in Black crossed with Gremlins with a healthy dose of Home Alone-style violence" and also mentioned that one of the biggest disappointments in the movie is the lack of screen time given to Tisdale, billed as one of the leading actors, who "gets a promising start as she rebels against her parents and struts around in her bikini, but she's quickly relegated to background fodder purely there to provide excess opportunities for the alien-controlled Ricky to shine" and concluded saying it seems "a bizarre and sad waste of her obvious comedic talent". The Miami Herald gave the film a mixed review, describing it as a "children's movie mix of live-action and animation, it has a few positive messages, a few laughs and a few comic throwdowns".

=== Box office ===
Aliens in the Attic grossed $8 million its opening weekend while playing in 3,108 theaters, ranking No. 5 at the North American box office. The film ended its theatrical run on November 22, 2009, having grossed $25.2 million domestically and $32.7 million internationally for a worldwide total of $59.6 million.

=== Accolades ===
- 2009 Teen Choice Awards
  - Movie Star: Female – Ashley Tisdale (Nomination)
- 2010 Young Artist Awards
  - Young Ensemble Cast: Megan Parker, Henri Young, Regan Young, Austin Robert Butler, Carter Jenkins (Nomination)

== Video game ==
Aliens in the Attic
- Developer: Revistronic
- Publisher: Playlogic
- Composer: Bart Roijmans
- Platforms: Nintendo DS, Wii, PlayStation 2, Microsoft Windows
- Release: August 4, 2009
- Genre: Adventure
- Mode: Single player

A video game based on the movie of the same name released on August 4, 2009, in North America, followed by an international release on August 6, 2009.

The game developers were Revistronic for the Wii, PlayStation 2, and Microsoft Windows platforms and Engine Software for the Nintendo DS, published by Playlogic. The game following the storyline of the movie and it was available for Wii, PlayStation 2, Microsoft Windows, and Nintendo DS.

The game also offers players two different gameplay perspectives depending upon which video game platform players choose. The game allows to play as Tom, Hannah, Jake, or Sparks, Skip, Tazer and Razor across 15 missions. Although the game is based on the movie, Tazer is renamed to “Spike” in this video game adaptation for unknown reasons. This new name is seen in the in-game dialogue and booklet and game cover.
