= Kelli Williams =

American actress

- Born: Kelli Renee Williams; June 8, 1970 (age 56); Los Angeles, California, U.S.
- Occupations: Actress, Director
- Years active: 1989–present
- Spouse: Ajay Sahgal (m. 1996; div. 2017) Lynsey Peisinger (m. 2026)
- Children: 3
- Mother: Shannon Wilcox

Kelli Renee Williams (born June 8, 1970) is an American actress and director. She is known for her roles as lawyer Lindsay Dole on the ABC legal drama The Practice, psychologist and deception expert Dr. Gillian Foster on the Fox series Lie to Me, Jackie Clarke on the Lifetime series Army Wives, and Margaret Reed on the NBC drama series Found.

== Early life & education ==
Kelli Williams was born in Los Angeles, California. She is the daughter of actress Shannon Wilcox and plastic surgeon John Williams. Her parents divorced when she was 13. She has one brother and two half-brothers.

Williams earned her Screen Actors Guild card before her first birthday by appearing in a diapers commercial, and appeared in several other commercials as a child. She attended elementary school at Lycée Français, and graduated from Beverly Hills High School in 1988. While attending school, she was active in the performing arts department. After starring opposite Steve Burton (who would go on to gain fame on General Hospital) in the school's production of Romeo and Juliet, she was signed by an agent.

== Career ==
Williams began her career on television in 1989, with a role in an episode of the CBS series Beauty and the Beast and as the first victim of the Hillside Stranglers in NBC's made-for-TV film The Case of the Hillside Stranglers.

Her first feature film appearances were in Zapped Again! (1990) and There Goes My Baby (1994) opposite ER star Noah Wyle. She also appeared in The Young Riders in 1991. On television, she guest-starred in the 1992 Law & Order episode "Sisters Of Mercy" as a meth addict who accuses a nun of sexually abusing her. In 1994, she played Jennifer Stolpa in the TV movie Snowbound: The Jim and Jennifer Stolpa Story. She guest starred on the Fox teen drama Party of Five in its first season in 1994 as Annie Alcott.

Beginning with episode 11, "Moon Cross" (aired on February 5, 1995), of the science-fiction series Earth 2, Williams appeared in a multiple episode story arc in the role of Mary, a human orphan raised on another planet by the indigenous alien species known as the Terrians.

In 1997, she took her most prominent role as Lindsay Dole Donnell on the ABC legal drama The Practice. She appeared in the series The Lyon's Den and Hack, as well as two episodes of Scrubs. Williams appeared as Dr. Natalie Durant on the NBC television show Medical Investigation which began in the fall of 2004 and ran for 20 episodes before being canceled. Also in 2004, she starred in the TV movie A Boyfriend for Christmas.

In 2000, Williams starred in the TV movie Flowers for Algernon, based on the novel/short story by Daniel Keyes.

In May 2007, she portrayed Holly Lauren/Kathleen Shaw in the Law & Order: Criminal Intent sixth-season finale episode, "Renewal," as a friendly neighbor of Detective Mike Logan (Chris Noth); her character died toward the end of the episode. In August 2008, Williams was cast in a lead role as psychologist Dr. Gillian Foster in the Fox series Lie to Me, opposite Tim Roth as Dr. Cal Lightman, which ran for three seasons and ended in 2011.

In April 2011, she was cast in a guest role as Shelley Chamberlain, a grieving mother on a killing spree in the CBS series Criminal Minds. In October 2011, she was cast in a guest role as a kidnapped child's mother called Elizabeth Flint in the CBS series The Mentalist. In 2012, she landed the recurring role of Jackie Clarke in the Lifetime series Army Wives and was quickly promoted to a series regular.

On August 12, 2015, Ties That Bind, the first original series from the Up Network, debuted with Williams playing police detective Allison McLean. The series balances McLean's work and family.

From 2016 on, she worked primarily as a director on multiple TV shows, including The Fosters, The Resident, All American, and All American: Homecoming.

In 2020, she joined the cast of the new Paramount network series, Coyote, starring Michael Chiklis.

In 2022, she joined the cast of the NBC series, Found.

== Personal life ==
Williams was married to author Ajay Sahgal from 1996 to 2017. She converted to Hinduism after marrying her husband. The couple has three children. Williams also speaks French and Spanish, and has volunteered with the Young Storytellers Program.

== Filmography ==
=== Director ===
Year	Title	Notes
2004	The Practice	"In Good Conscience"
2013	Army Wives	"Blood and Treasure"
2016–2017	The Fosters	3 Episodes: "Justify", "Welcome to the Jungler", and "Scars"
2017	Rosewood	"Clavicle Trauma & Closure"
2019	Good Trouble	"Willful Blindness"
2019	The Resident	2 episodes: "Snowed In" & "Woman Down"
2019	Charmed	"The Rules of Engagement"
2020	Sweet Magnolias	2 episodes: "Give Drink to the Thirsty ", "Lay It All Down"
2021–2024	All American	4 episodes: "My Mind's Playing Tricks on Me", "How Come", "Don't Sweat the Technique", "Trust Issues"
2021	The Resident	"Into the Unknown"
2022	All American: Homecoming	"Under Pressure"
2022	Walker	"Champagne Problems"
2022	Big Sky	"The Woods Are Lovely, Dark and Deep"
2025	Found	"Missing While Grieving"
2026	High Potential	"The Faust and the Furious"
2026	Doc	"S.O.S"

=== Film ===
Year	Title	Role	Notes
1990	Zapped Again!	Lucy Kaminsky	
1993	Mr. Jones	Kelli	
1994	There Goes My Baby	Sunshine	
1996	E=mc2	Claire Higgins	
1999	Kismet	Kelly	Short film
2000	It's a Shame About Ray	Anna	Short film
2010	The Space Between	Junkie	
2012	Any Day Now	Miss Flemming	

=== Television ===
Year	Title	Role	Notes
1989	Beauty and the Beast	Young Lisa	Episode: "Arabesque"
1989	The Case of the Hillside Stranglers	Margaret Wilson	TV movie
1989	Day by Day	Ross' Girlfriend	3 episodes
1989	Out on the Edge	Melissa	TV movie
1989	CBS Summer Playhouse	Natalie	Episode: "Curse of the Corn People"
1989	Island Son	Elisa Bordinet	Episode: "Sometimes They're Zebras"
1989	Quantum Leap	Shannon	Episode: "Disco Inferno"
1990	Elvis	Mattie Walker	13 episodes
1990	My Life as a Babysitter	Kelly	TV movie
1991	CBS Schoolbreak Special	Cassie O'Brian	Episode: "But He Loves Me"
1991	Switched at Birth	Irisa	TV movie
1991	The Young Riders	Emily Metcalfe	Episode: "The Presence of Mine Enemies"
1992	A Woman Scorned: The Betty Broderick Story	Kate Broderick	TV movie
1992, 2026	Law & Order	Maggie Corson, Ann Merrick	Episodes: "Sisters of Mercy" (1992), "Ride or Die" (2026)
1992	Sisters	Sarah Nolan	Episode: "Pandora's Box"
1992	Her Final Fury: Betty Broderick, the Last Chapter	Kate Broderick	TV movie
1993	For Their Own Good	Erma	Movie
1993	Lifepod	Rena Jahnusia	TV movie
1994	Snowbound: The Jim and Jennifer Stolpa Story	Jennifer Stolpa	TV movie
1994	Party of Five	Annie Alcott	Episode: "Thanksgiving"
1995	Earth 2	Mary	2 episodes
1995	New York News	Ellie	13 episodes
1996	Voice from the Grave	Yvonne Shuster	TV movie
1996	Picket Fences	Hannah Mary Beiler	Episode: "To Forgive Is Devine"
1996	Mary & Tim	Justine Melville	TV movie
1997–2003	The Practice	Lindsay Dole	145 episodes Nominated: Satellite Award for Best Actress – Television Series Drama (1999); Screen Actors Guild Award for Outstanding Performance by an Ensemble in a Drama Series (1998–2000)
1998	Ally McBeal	Lindsay Dole	Episode: "The Inmates"
1999	Sweetwater	Cami Carlson	TV movie
2000	Flowers for Algernon	Alice Kinian	TV movie
2002	Scrubs	Kristen Murphy	2 episodes
2003	The Lyon's Den	Attorney Monica Crane	3 episodes
2003	Hack	Charlotte Weston	Episode: "My Fare Lady"
2004	A Boyfriend for Christmas	Holly Grant	Hallmark TV movie
2004–05	Medical Investigation	Dr. Natalie Durant	20 episodes
2005	Third Watch	Dr. Natalie Durant	Episode: "In the Family Way"
2006	Murder on Pleasant Drive	Deanna Whelen	TV movie
2007	Law & Order: Criminal Intent	Holly Lauren/Kathleen Shaw	Episode: "Renewal"
2007–08	Men in Trees	Julia Switzer	6 episodes
2008	The One That Got Away	Joanna	TV movie
2009–11	Lie to Me	Dr. Gillian Foster	48 episodes
2011	Criminal Minds	Shelley Chamberlain	Episode: "Hanley Waters"
2011	The Mentalist	Beth Flint	Episode: "Pretty Red Balloon"
2012–13	Army Wives	Jackie Clark	Series regular (32 episodes)
2014–15	NCIS	Special Agent Maureen Cabot	Episodes: "Alleged" and "Viral"
2014	Ties That Bind	Allison McLean	Series regular (10 episodes)
2016	The Fosters	Justina Marks	6 episodes
2016	Law & Order: Special Victims Unit	Melanie Harper	Episode: "Making a Rapist"
2017	Early Release	Taylor Reynolds	TV movie
2017	A Song for Christmas	Jennifer Flynn	TV movie
2021	Coyote	Jill Kerr	TV series
2023–25	Found	Margaret Reed	TV series
