= Zane Buzby =

American actress

- Occupations: director, actress, philanthropist

Zane Buzby is an American director, actress, and philanthropist.

== Life and career ==
Zane Buzby grew up in East Meadow, New York, and graduated with honors from Hofstra University with degrees in performance and dramatic literature. She began her show business career as an assistant film editor working for The Beatles' Apple Films on The Concert for Bangladesh and The Holy Mountain by Alejandro Jodorowsky. Her first major acting credit was in the Carl Reiner film Oh, God! (1977). She appeared in the films Up in Smoke (1978) (opposite Cheech & Chong), Americathon (1979) (opposite John Ritter), National Lampoon's Class Reunion (1982) scripted by John Hughes), Jerry Lewis' film Cracking Up (1983), and the Rob Reiner film This Is Spinal Tap (1984). She also co-starred in and directed the feature film comedy Last Resort (1986), starring Charles Grodin.

Buzby became a television director (mentored by James Burrows and producer Edgar J. Scherick), and went on to amass over 200 directing credits in episodic television, including directing episodes of The Golden Girls, Married... with Children, Newhart, My Sister Sam, Head of the Class, My Two Dads, Charles in Charge, Blossom; and the pilots for Sister, Sister, ADAM starring comedian/actor Adam Ferrara, and The Rock starring Joy Behar. Buzby directed the pilot of HBO's comedy concert "Women of the Night" starring Martin Short, Ellen DeGeneres, Rita Rudner, Judy Tenuta and Paula Poundstone.

Buzby has devoted herself to philanthropy, assisting Holocaust survivors in Eastern Europe. She is the founder of The Survivor Mitzvah Project (SMP), a humanitarian effort bringing emergency aid to the last survivors of the Holocaust in Eastern Europe. She is also the founder of SMP's Holocaust Educational Archive, a growing repository of thousands of letters and photographs from Holocaust survivors in nine countries and hundreds of hours of videotape shot in 6 countries in Eastern Europe, depicting never before recorded testimony and locations illustrating the "Holocaust in the East".

She and husband Conan Berkeley are working on a documentary film titled Family of Strangers, about The Survivor Mitzvah Project's emergency efforts to help the last survivors of the Holocaust. Shot on location in six countries, the film spans 17 years of emergency aid expeditions led by Buzby in remote areas of Belarus, Latvia, Lithuania, Moldova, Transnistria, and Ukraine.

== Awards ==
Buzby has received numerous awards and honors for her humanitarian work and commitment to the plight of over 2500 Holocaust survivors helped through SMP. In 2011, she was awarded the KCET Local Hero Award for her humanitarian work, and in 2013, was profiled as a "Hero at Home" by KTLA. In 2014, Buzby was named a "CNN Hero". In 2017, she received the Anti-Defamation League's "Deborah Award", honoring outstanding women whose professional leadership, philanthropy, and civic contributions exemplify the ideals of the Anti-Defamation League. She has also received the 2017 "International Mensch Foundation Award" along with the former director of the United States Holocaust Memorial Museum, Michael Berenbaum.
