= Last Resort (1986 film) =

1986 comedy directed by Zane Buzby

- DVD cover
- Directed by: Zane Buzby
- Written by: Jeff Buhai; Steve Zacharias; Charles Grodin (uncredited)
- Produced by: Julie Corman
- Starring: Charles Grodin; Robin Pearson Rose; Megan Mullally; John Ashton; Jon Lovitz
- Cinematography: Stephen M. Katz; Alex Nepomniaschy
- Edited by: Gregory Scherick
- Music by: Steve Nelson; Thomas Richard Sharp
- Production company: Trinity Pictures
- Distributed by: Concorde Pictures
- Release date: April 1986 (USA)
- Running time: 84 minutes
- Country: United States
- Language: English
- Budget: less than $1 million

Last Resort is a 1986 comedy film directed by Zane Buzby and produced by Julie Corman. It revolves around George Lollar (Charles Grodin), who takes his family on vacation to "Club Sand", a shoddy and untrustworthy company. On this tropical island they find soldiers everywhere, an unhelpful staff, inhospitable accommodations and undesirable holiday makers, but everyone except for George manages to have fun in the sun.

The film was an attempt by Concorde Pictures to make a comedy in the vein of National Lampoon's Vacation. Charles Grodin called it "what I personally believe is the funniest movie I've ever done, albeit a cheap-looking one."

== Plot ==
A Chicago salesman (Charles Grodin) takes his wife (Robin Pearson Rose) and children to Club Sand, a hot spot surrounded by barbed wire.

== Cast ==
- Charles Grodin as George Lollar
- Megan Mullally as Jessica Lollar
- Scott Nemes as Bobby Lollar
- Robin Pearson Rose as Sheila Lollar
- Christopher Ames as Brad Lollar
- Ian Abercrombie as The Maitre d'
- John Ashton as Phil Cocoran
- Ellen Blake as Dorothy Cocoran
- Brenda Bakke as Veroneeka
- Gerrit Graham as Curt
- Phil Hartman as Jean-Michel
- Chip Johannessen as The Firebreather
- Steve Levitt as Pierre
- Jon Lovitz as The Bartender
- Michael Markowitz as Guerilla
- David Mirkin as Walter Ambrose
- Mario Van Peebles as Pino
- Jacob Vargas as Carlos
- Brett Baxter Clark as Manuello
- Buck Young as Mr. Emerson
- Zane Buzby as Martine

== Production ==
The film was from the writers of Revenge of the Nerds. It was originally called Club Sandwich.

Charles Grodin said his agent tried to persuade him not to make the film as "he felt Roger Corman and Charles Grodin could be a troublesome combination, but I liked the script and they said I could pick the director. Eventually they also hired me to do a rewrite." Grodin estimated he "rewrote every scene and added about twenty new ones. In fact, I would say I wrote 90 percent of everything spoken in the picture." However the Writers Guild gave the original writers sole credit.

Grodin was presented with four directors and selected Zane Busby, who had never directed a film before but was an established comic actor. Grodin says the writers wanted another director but Busby "was a happy choice. She seemed to know where every undiscovered comedy actor in Hollywood was." This included Phil Hartman and Jon Lovitz.

The film was mostly shot in Catalina Island and Los Angeles, with scenes filmed in Griffith Park and the San Fernando Valley. Grodin said " No one had actually told me how low budget the picture was, and I could never bring myself to ask" but said filming "was a strange but kind of magical experience."

Grodin said when the film "was finished it was screened and the response was everything we hoped it would be."

== Release ==
In July 1985 it was announced Roger Corman's newly formed distribution company Concorde Pictures would team with Cinema Group to distribute films. Their first releases would include Club Sandwich (which became Last Resort) and Cocaine Wars from Concorde and Born American and Hollywood Vice Squad from Cinema Group.

Grodin said he "knew that with Roger releasing it, because of the lack of marketing money available, its exposure would be extremely limited." He said he tried to buy the film from Corman along with two friends of his, Edgar Scherick and Julian Schlosberg, but Corman refused, "probably figuring we knew something."

Grodin said Roger Corman premiered the film on cable before it was released theatrically to avoid giving the writers a bonus.

== Reception ==
Roger Ebert wrote, "There are countless comic possibilities in Last Resort, most of them unrealized."

Gene Siskel in the Chicago Tribune wrote, "what a waste of a perfectly good idea for a comedy."

The San Francisco Examiner said it was "a sundrenched goofball comedy" that "was worth the trip".

The film earned $204,000 in its first weekend. It was a commercial disappointment although Grodin argued "I'm sure it made money for Roger."

== Notes ==
- Grodin, Charles (1994). We're ready for you, Mr. Grodin.
