= Flowers for Algernon (film) =

2000 American-Canadian television film

- Film poster
- Based on: Flowers for Algernon by Daniel Keyes
- Screenplay by: John Pielmeier
- Directed by: Jeff Bleckner
- Starring: Matthew Modine
- Theme music composer: Mark Adler
- Countries of origin: United States; Canada
- Original language: English

Production
- Producer: Mark Winemaker
- Cinematography: Michael Fash
- Editor: Geoffrey Rowland
- Running time: 91 minutes
- Production companies: Alliance Atlantis Communications; Citadel Entertainment; Storyline Entertainment

Original release
- Network: CBS
- Release: February 20, 2000

Flowers for Algernon is a 2000 American-Canadian television film written by John Pielmeier, directed by Jeff Bleckner and starring Matthew Modine. It is the second screen adaptation of Daniel Keyes' 1966 novel of the same name following the 1968 film Charly.

== Plot ==
Charlie Gordon is a mentally disabled young man who is a part-time baker. Alice, the teacher at the special school that he attends, suggests he undergo an operation to increase his intelligence. In pre-treatment tests, Charlie sees how a mouse named Algernon manages to get out of an elaborate maze—something that he has not been able to do.

After surgery, Charlie's intellectual abilities improve dramatically. He realizes that until then many people have made fun of him because of his "differentness". Doctor Strauss, who treats Charlie, asks him to accompany him to a surgery conference. Strauss's speech shocks Charlie, who gives a very harsh speech towards the scientist and prophesies, based on the results obtained with a similar experiment by a Russian researcher, that the increase to his intelligence will only be temporary and that he will soon regress to his previous mental state. Charlie then causes panic by releasing some mice into the classroom.

Back home, Dr. Strauss confesses that he knows the results of the Russian experiments; as if that was not enough, Algernon starts feeling ill. Charlie decides to use the little time that is left for him to try to find a solution to the problem. He realizes that he was wrong to focus everything on the rational part of him and goes to visit his mother, with whom he had severed all relationships many years ago.

Algernon dies in the hands of Charlie, who secretly buries him to prevent him from being dissected. He goes back to the bakery. Saying goodbye to Alice, who is in love with him, heartbroken at how the situation has evolved, he asks her to bring flowers to Algernon's grave.

== Cast ==
- Matthew Modine as Charlie Gordon
- Kelli Williams as Alice Kinnian
- Ron Rifkin as Dr. Jonah Strauss
- Bonnie Bedelia as Rose
- Richard Chevolleau as Burt
- Jeff Pustil as Gimpy
- Ken James as Mr. Donner
- Richard Fitzpatrick as Frank
- Cameron Bowen as Young Charlie
- Gloria Slade as Faye
- Cliff Saunders as Mike
- Kathryn Kirkpatrick as Bernice

== Production ==
The film was shot in Toronto.
