= There Goes My Baby (film) =

- Theatrical release poster
- Directed by: Floyd Mutrux
- Written by: Floyd Mutrux
- Produced by: Robert Shapiro; Barry Spikings; Rick Finkelstein
- Starring: Dermot Mulroney; Rick Schroder; Noah Wyle; Kelli Williams; Lucy Deakins
- Cinematography: William A. Fraker
- Edited by: Danford B. Greene; Maysie Hoy
- Music by: Dick Bernstein; Budd Carr
- Production company: Nelson Entertainment
- Distributed by: Orion Pictures
- Release date: September 2, 1994
- Running time: 99 minutes
- Country: United States
- Language: English
- Budget: $10.5 million
- Box office: $123,509

There Goes My Baby (also released as The Last Days of Paradise) is a 1994 American coming-of-age comedy-drama film written and directed by Floyd Mutrux and starring Dermot Mulroney, Rick Schroder, Noah Wyle, Lucy Deakins, and Kelli Williams.

Told from the point of view of the class valedictorian, Mary Beth, the story follows a group of high school seniors during the 1965 Watts riots. The film was finished and originally intended for a theatrical run in 1991 but did not receive its release until September 2, 1994.

== Plot ==
In 1961 the freshman class of Westwood High School in Los Angeles is profiled in Look magazine. In the article they are called "the future of the country." Now it's four years later, and that class is experiencing their last day of school. That night, they all meet at the local teenage hangout, Pop's Paradise Café. Pop's is scheduled for demolition in two days, to make way for a mall. Over the course of the night, we learn of the hopes, dreams and fears of a close-knit group of friends. Throughout the film, the soundtrack is provided by The Beard, a DJ at the local AM radio station.

Pirate dreams of traveling the country, and his girlfriend, Sunshine, wants to move to San Francisco to become a flower child. Stick just wants to surf, but he's being shipped off to Vietnam in a few days. Finnegan wants to be a poet, and Babette dreams of a career as a singer, while Tracy simply dreams of finding love. Calvin is the first graduate of Westwood H.S. to earn a full scholarship to Princeton University. Mary Beth, whose adult persona serves as the narrator for the film, is arguing with her parents; she wants to go to University of California, Berkeley, while her parents want her to stay closer to home and attend UCLA.

As the night progresses, the Watts riots begin. Calvin, who lives in Watts, fears for his grandmother's safety. Finnegan, whose family has unofficially adopted Calvin, drives him into the riot zone. When Finnegan is attacked by a group of rioters, Calvin sends him home, while he continues on to find his grandmother. We also learn that Stick is scheduled to report to basic training for the army in two days, after he has enlisted. When Finnegan gets back to Pops, he finds out that another of their friends, Morrisey, who has been distraught over the death of his brother several months earlier in the Vietnam War, has gone back to the high school to make some sort of protest. During the protest, he burns his draft card and is arrested.

Later that night, Pirate learns that Sunshine is pregnant, and neither know what they want to do with the baby. Pirate finds out about a place where Sunshine can have an abortion. Finnegan, meanwhile, breaks up with his girlfriend, Tracy, due to her neediness and seeming lack of understanding. We also find out that Babette is going to attempt to get on a local, live rock and roll program, Shindig, the following night.

The next day, his grandmother safe, Calvin returns to his job at Pops. Pirate and Sunshine struggle over what to do about the baby. Tracy is distraught over her break-up with Finnegan. And, Stick and Finnegan struggle with their positions on the draft and the war. As the evening draws to a close, they learn their friend, Morrisey, has hanged himself in his cell. Finnegan makes a decision to make a stand on his friend's behalf and returns to the high school, where he burns the bronze statue on the front lawn. Stick freaks out about his impending deployment but is calmed down by Pops and his friends. Babette, meanwhile, has lucked out and gotten her wish to perform on Shindig, singing "Leader of the Pack".

Sunshine makes the decision, while speaking with Mary Beth, to keep the baby but not to tell Pirate. Sunshine and Pirate part ways in the parking lot of Pops, as she boards a Volkswagen Bus (decorated with peace signs and flowers) headed for the Bay Area.

In the final scene, we learn the fate of all the characters from the movie, via a voice-over from Mary Beth:

"Pop was right; they tore down the Paradise and put up a shopping mall. Of course, I’ve never been there. I said we’d be best friends forever, and I will never forget you. Of course, I haven’t seen any of them since that night, except for Sunshine. Sunshine remains my best friend today, and I’m the godmother of her 25-year-old son, whose name is Pirate. Pirate never made it to Route 66. He was drafted into the Army and killed in action in the Mekong Delta. Babette hung out and toured in the music business for 10 years. Today, she produces a successful rock-n-roll show. Calvin graduated from Princeton and became a successful lawyer. In 1982, he was elected to the United States Senate. Poor Tracy, she was married three times and in and out of the Betty Ford Clinic. She was still seeking her own salvation. Stick won a Bronze Star for valor in Vietnam. Today, he owns a surf shop in Laguna Beach called Stick’s Paradise. The most popular course on campus at UCLA is called The Road to Freedom. It’s taught by Michael Finnegan. As for me, I said I’d never forget you, and I meant it. So, I wrote a book about the last night of Paradise, and I dedicated it to all of you. It’s called, There Goes My Baby."

== Cast ==
- Dermot Mulroney as "Pirate"
- Ricky Schroder as "Stick"
- Kelli Williams as "Sunshine"
- Noah Wyle as Finnegan
- Jill Schoelen as Babette
- Kristin Minter as Tracy
- Lucy Deakins as Mary Beth
- Kenny Ransom as Calvin
- Seymour Cassel as Pop
- Fred Coffin as Mr. Maran
- Janet MacLachlan as Lottie
- Andrew Robinson as Frank
- Miguel A. Núñez Jr. as Rodney
- Paul Gleason as Mr. Burton (as Paul Xavier Gleason)
- Shon Greenblatt as Morrisey
- Shannon Wilcox as Mattie
- Mark Ruffalo as J.D.
- Anne Archer as Adult Mary Beth / The Narrator

== Release ==
The film was originally scheduled for release in 1991, but due to Orion's bankruptcy in 1991, its release was delayed until September 2, 1994. This made it unintentionally a modern social commentary, as the film deals with the 1965 Watts Riots, and was not released until after the 1992 Los Angeles riots.

The film portrays the 1965 Watts Riots as occurring on the last day of summer school and the first night of orientation for the following year, matching the fact that the riots occurred in August of that year.

== Reception ==
Reception to the film was mixed. Variety said the film was a "riveting, infectious comic drama [that] has a real shot at sleeper success with proper support." TV Guide called it the "most overwrought celebration of coming of age in the 1960s since Arthur Penn's catastrophic Four Friends." The film opened on 122 screens in three minor markets in the United States and grossed $84,137 in the 4-day Labor Day weekend and went on to only gross $123,509 at the US box office.
