= Vanished (2006 TV series) =

2006 American TV series

- Genre: Drama; Thriller
- Created by: Josh Berman
- Starring: Gale Harold; Eddie Cibrian; John Allen Nelson; Joanne Kelly; Margarita Levieva; John Patrick Amedori; Christopher Egan; Robert Hoffman; Ming-Na Wen; Rebecca Gayheart
- Country of origin: United States
- Original language: English
- No. of seasons: 1
- No. of episodes: 13

Production
- Executive producers: Josh Berman; Carla Kettner; Mimi Leder; Charles Pratt, Jr. Paul Redford
- Running time: 43 minutes
- Production companies: Osprey Productions; 20th Century Fox Television

Original release
- Network: Fox
- Release: August 21 – December 8, 2006

Vanished is an American drama television series produced by 20th Century Fox. The series premiered on August 21, 2006 on Fox and its last episode aired on November 10, 2006. Based in Atlanta, Georgia, the series begins with the sudden disappearance of the wife of a Georgia senator, which is quickly revealed to be part of a wider conspiracy. The family of the missing woman, a pair of FBI agents, a journalist and her lover/cameraman, are all drawn into an evolving mystery with political and religious undertones. The show was created by CSI writer Josh Berman, and executive produced by Mimi Leder, who also directed the show, and Paul Redford.

On October 26, 2006, USA Today reported that the planned 22-episode series was ordered to be wrapped up after the 13th episode. The story arc of finding Sara Collins was to be concluded, with the mystery of a larger conspiracy left dangling in the event the series was extended. On November 16, 2006, Fox confirmed that the show would end after a final episode in December.

On December 8, 2006, the final episode of Vanished appeared online. The production team was told a few months before the show was taken off the air to at least reveal Sara's fate by the 13th episode, but none of the other plotlines were resolved.

According to a report of E! Online's Kristin dos Santos on July 23, 2007, the unsolved mystery behind Vanished was to be the focus of an episode of Bones, during the third season. However, the 2007–2008 Writers Guild of America strike shortened the season, and that episode was never developed.

== Plot ==
A secretive sect of Freemasons is trying to decipher several Dead Sea scrolls found in Jerusalem, Israel, and is willing to go to great length in order to do so. The key storyline revolves around an upcoming supreme court nomination of a new judge. In order to secure to the nomination, the conspirators kidnap the wife of a U.S. Senator, which is the trigger to the entire plot. The supreme court will soon rule on legal evidence issue, which will impact the faith of a renowned Dead Sea scholar currently awaiting execution for killing his research team as well as for his wife murder, although her body was never found. The conspirators are looking to overturn the scholar's conviction therefore freeing him and allowing the decipher of the scrolls.

The story begins in Atlanta when Sara Collins (nee Jerome) vanishes from a dinner held in her honor. Sara is a teacher, in early 30's, and Senator Jeffrey Collins's second wife. She had previously told her husband that she had a secret to tell him, but disappeared before she could reveal it to him.

The investigation into her kidnapping starts to uncover secrets. While Senator Collins is clean and desperately wants his wife returned, even paying the ransoms will not get her back. He paid $5,000,000 in cash and then voted as requested by kidnappers to confirm a Supreme Court nominee. He initially held support for this nominee, despite being his long time close friend, because he knew the nominee seduced an underage girl.

What Senator Collins did not know was that the underage girl was actually his daughter, Marcy. Marcy ended the affair with the judge after being caught by Sara, but was later raped by him and subsequently became pregnant. Marcy believes she was then poisoned to induce a miscarriage.

Senator Collins' son, Max, had gotten into trouble over underage drinking and DUI. Sara urged Jeffrey to put him in a rehab facility. There, Max expressed a hatred for his stepmother, which was used against her by the conspiracy (his counselor Quinn was one of the conspirators).

Senator Collins' ex-wife worked her way back into Senator Collins's life via their mutual children. She confronted Sara over the birth of her child but despite her hatred of Sara, never revealed the truth, given her disappearance. Senator Collins' ex-wife was financially broke and eventually took a bribe from Senator Collins' chief of staff, which she gave to Marcy to help her daughter bail her boyfriend out of jail.

Sara went through torture and manipulation when she was in captivity. She was fed certain information and that made her believe that Collins took her kidnapping as opportunity to advance his career. These lies led her to flee to the last place where she felt anonymous and safe - the same place she fled the rehab facility once before, Gloucester, Massachusetts.

FBI Agent Graham Kelton solved many aspects of the kidnapping, and even managed to contact the mysterious person leaving St. Nathan prayer cards with clues for him. He found out that the person wanted the conspiracy undone more than Sara's rescue. He eventually solved the real ransom demand of the conspiracy, the supreme court vote, but after stopping the vote with a bioterrorist attack simulation, he was shot and killed by one of the conspirators, before he can give any details.

FBI Agent Lucas takes over after the killing of Agent Graham, and successfully tracks down more leads, leading to a raid on a conspiracy site where dead sea scrolls were being scanned into a computer. However, while he gets very close to Sara a few times after she escapes, he is unable to unravel the false trail Sara left behind her as she escaped to her safe place with Peter Manning.

Agent Lucas also discovers that a rehab facility, known as Encompass, was used as a front by the conspiracy to recruit addicted vulnerable youth. Sara, Ben, Max and Quinn all attended this same rehab facility, with Quinn later becoming a counselor and a recruiter there. Sara had been checked into this facility by her parents 12 years ago when she was a 19, however, she escaped. Quinn later shared that Sara was the only person to ever escape the facility, and it might have been a factor in her kidnapping. After Sara's escape she lived for few months under a false name in Gloucester, Massachusetts. There she worked as a waitress in a bar, got into a relationship with Peter Manning local fisherman, and later got pregnant by him. Sara then left without telling anyone, including her boyfriend, gave birth to the a baby girl, name Becca. However, her parents raised Becca as her sister for a reason not fully explained in the show. The FBI wonders why would Sara who was tortured at the Encompass facility conceived Senator Collins to send Max there, but this question is never addressed.

Ben Wilson, Marcy Collins' boyfriend, was released on bond from Marcy, who believed his story. He believes he is the father of Marcy's unborn child, and despite his innocence over prior events, was enraged by the rape of Marcy and murdered the Judge who attack her. In the end of the show it was unclear If he got away with it. It is also never confirmed if the Marcy's unborn child was a result of her affair with the judge or her relationship with Ben, as both took place at the same time.

Agent Lucas uncover the mystery around the scholar. After the scholar found the Dead Sea Scrolls he found hidden messages there he thought was so dangerous he destroyed his research, and killed of his research team. He also lied about murdering his wife in order to protect her. However, it was later revealed the conspirators found out his wife was actually alive and kidnapped her leverage to coerce his help with the decipher once he is released from prison.

Peter Manning is a man searching for the love of his life, who one day vanished from Massachusetts, where he worked on a fishing boat. He sees her again in the news as recently kidnapped wife of Senator Collins news. He still loves her, but his lead to the FBI is classified as low priority. He embarks on a mission to find her. He finds his child, but can't find a way to make things right. He gives up in the end, and returns to his boat to find that Sara is there. It's the place she ran to before; where she could be anonymous and find love. Judy Nash is a reporter covering Sara's kidnapping. She believes in her story about Peter Manning fathering a child with Sara, but is cut off as she doesn't have the proof. While Peter got her proof that he was the father, there is no proof about the mother. Without Sara, there is no story.

The series finale shows Senator Collins in a family dinner with his ex-wife and their two children. Sara, meanwhile, appears in aboard Peter Manning's boat. She says to explains that twelve years ago she was pregnant and was taken away by "them". Peter interrupts her, and says, "none of that matters now. You're home", and they embrace.

== Production history ==
Vanished was the first project to emerge from a four-year creative deal between Josh Berman and 20th Century Fox. In January 2006, the studio ordered the production of the pilot and two additional scripts. It was announced that Gale Harold would star.

In April 2006, Vanished became one of two shows to get the early pickup by Fox. The network picked the show up for 12 additional episodes. It was then announced that the show would premiere following Prison Break, in the time slot 24 occupies from January to May.

Shortly thereafter, it was announced that John Allen Nelson would star opposite Harold. On June 19, 2006, it was learned that Penelope Ann Miller would guest star in six episodes and have the option of becoming a regular. It was then announced that Josh Hopkins would guest on several episodes and that Eddie Cibrian would also join the cast.

Gale Harold departed the series after the eighth episode after his character was killed off by the show's producers. Eddie Cibrian was named the lead actor of the series beginning with the ninth episode.

On November 15, 2006 Fox announced they were pulling the show for the rest of sweeps but that it would return on December 1, 2006. On November 16, 2006, Fox said that the show would not return to television and the remaining four episodes would be available online only, with one new show added every Friday and the series finale added December 8, 2006. Originally, the online episodes were only watchable by Windows users visiting Fox's website. Fox has since put the entire series of Vanished online on Hulu.

== Episodes ==
No.	Title	Directed by	Written by	Original release date	Prod. code
1	"Pilot"	Mimi Leder	Josh Berman	August 21, 2006	1AMB79
Senator Jeffrey Collins and his wife Sara are happy and in love. Sara is being honored for her work with Children First, and has a surprise to tell her husband. When Sara suddenly disappears, Senator Collins and Graham Kelton from the FBI start the investigation to find her.
2	"The Tunnel"	Mimi Leder	Carla Kettner	August 28, 2006	1AMB01
A call comes into the FBI hotline from a man claiming to know Sara as Nicky Johnson several years ago. Also Senator Collins ex-wife Jessica is being looked at as a suspect in the disappearance. A tunnel is found and Agent Kelton gets another secret message about St. Nathan and the numbers 9:29.
3	"Drop"	Stephen Cragg	Paul Redford & Sharon Lee Watson	September 4, 2006	1AMB02
While wearing a wire and being watched by the FBI, the Senator attempts to make a ransom drop in Atlanta. He enters an exterior glass elevator on the instructions of the kidnappers, and he receives a secret communication from them. The elevator suddenly falls, and Judy Nash's news team catches his falling elevator on tape.
4	"Before the Flood"	Frederick King Keller	J. R. Orci	September 11, 2006	1AMB03
The FBI brings in Ben for questioning. We learn why Marcy and Sara had a falling out, and Judy Nash heads to Gloucester to find out who Sara really is. To her surprise, all the evidence of her time in Gloucester has been systematically erased.
5	"The Feed"	Helen Shaver	Dan Dworkin & Jay Beattie	September 18, 2006	1AMB04
Ben's contact, Quinn, is being questioned. A search on her laptop reveals a live feed of Sarah in a cell at an unknown location. The team works to find the cell's location before the kidnappers realized that the feed has been hacked. Quinn manages to get a cryptic message to her partners in a Masonic code.
6	"Black Box"	Dwight H. Little	Chris Black	September 25, 2006	1AMB05
After reporter Judy Nash is scooped by a competitor she arranges a meeting with Kelton so they can work together. Jessica urges her ex-husband to take an appointment with the supreme court. Mei, Kelton and Tyner continue to work on leads that change the investigation.
7	"Resurrection"	Mimi Leder	Carla Kettner	October 2, 2006	1AMB06
Senator Collins gets some disturbing news as he makes plans to go back to Washington to vote for Judge Rainer's appointment to the Supreme Court.
8	"Aftermath"	Bryan Spicer	Carla Kettner	November 3, 2006	1AMB07
Daniel Lucas joins the FBI investigation team to find Sarah Collins. The kidnappers make their demands clear to Senator Collins.
9	"The New World"	Jesús Salvador Treviño	Melinda Hsu	November 10, 2006	1AMB08
Lucas and Mei follow a lead from Morrell's cell phone to a warehouse where they make a puzzling discovery. Meanwhile, the kidnappers try to manipulate Sarah into believing that Senator Collins is not looking for her.
10	"The Cell"	Bobby Roth	J. R. Orci	November 17, 2006†	1AMB09
Senator Collins' stress level reaches new heights as he struggles to cope with Sara's disappearance and life without her. Meanwhile, Agents Lucas and Mei visit a death row inmate linked to the conspiracy and fight back when the FBI offices are infiltrated.
11	"The Proffer"	Nelson McCormick	Dan Dworkin & Jay Beattie	November 24, 2006†	1AMB10
Agents Lucas, Mei and Tyner get ready for Sara's return after the demands are met. A tip with information about Kelton changes the direction of the investigation again.
12	"The Velocity of Sara"	Mimi Leder	Carla Kettner	December 1, 2006†	1AMB11
Sara manages to free herself, but a tracking device hinders her escape and the Sheriff's station is targeted. As the situation worsens, Sara makes a desperate call home. Meanwhile, Max reveals key information about his stint at rehab.
13	"Warm Springs"	Steve Shill	Carla Kettner	December 8, 2006†	1AMB12
As remaining clues come together when Agent Lucas intensely interrogates a Collins family member and Sara's phone call home pinpoints a new location, the unexpected happens and the mystery behind Sara and her location are revealed.

- † These episodes were shown on Vanished's MySpace page.

== Cast and characters ==
=== Main ===
- Gale Harold as Graham Kelton
- Eddie Cibrian as Daniel Lucas
- John Allen Nelson as Jeffrey Collins
- Joanne Kelly as Sara Collins
- Rebecca Gayheart as Judy Nash
- Margarita Levieva as Marcy Collins
- John Patrick Amedori as Max Collins
- Christopher Egan as Ben Wilson
- Robert Hoffman as Adam Putnam
- Ming-Na Wen as Lin Mei

=== Recurring ===
- Bianca Kajlich as Quinn Keeler
- Gary Werntz as Edward Morell
- Esai Morales as Michael Tyner
- Christopher Neame as Claude Alexander
- Christopher Cousins as Wallace Rainer
- Brian Elliott as DC Field Agent
- Josh Hopkins as Peter Manning
- David Berman as Edward Dockery
- Leslie Odom Jr. as Malik Christo
- Joseph C. Phillips as J.T. Morse
- Michael Harney as Robert Rubia
- Brandon Quinn as Mark Valera
- Randy Oglesby as Mr. Jerome
- Robin Pearson Rose as Mrs. Jerome
- Penelope Ann Miller as Jessica Nevins
- Michael O'Keefe as Bob Nagel
- Juliette Goglia as Becca Jerome
- Arie Verveen as Aaron Hensliegh
- Tom Schmid as Crane

== Ratings history and reaction ==
Despite earning mixed reviews, Vanished had a strong series premiere. Many Prison Break fans kept the channel on Fox to see the new thriller. When the second episode premiered, overall audience share declined compared to the first week. Yet, the show actually increased its share of the coveted 18-to-49-year-old demographic.

The premiere managed to beat TV's two highest rated sitcoms, Two and a Half Men and The New Adventures of Old Christine, in total viewers.

In later weeks the ratings started to show a continued decline due to the strong performance of NBC's new series, Heroes, and returning shows featured in CBS's Monday-night comedy lineup. Although Fox continued to air the series in the U.S., the Global Television network in Canada cancelled the series after airing only five episodes.

Following a three-week hiatus due to the Major League Baseball playoffs, Fox moved Vanished to the Friday Night Death Slot, where only two further episodes were broadcast. The first of these nominally starred Gale Harold, who had been dramatically killed off on episode 7, following weeks of rumors and a storm of viewer protest on various websites. Though Harold appeared as a corpse for a few seconds, this was actually the first episode to feature the show's new leading man Eddie Cibrian. The ratings had plummeted, slicing viewership in half and dropping Vanished to last place in its time slot. The following week the show did even worse, earning only 0.9% of the most desirable 18-to-49-year-old demographic.

On November 15, 2006 Fox announced it was pulling the show for the rest of the November sweeps. The next day, Fox had not yet officially cancelled the series, but announced that the final four unaired episodes would be made available in the U.S. only on the show's official MySpace, according to Fox's website.

In Australia, the first two episodes aired back to back and rated 1.1 million mainland capital city viewers, making it the winner of its time-slot and the eighth most watched program for the night. The third episode's ratings dropped slightly to 998,000 viewers, but retained eighth position for the night. By the fourth episode, ratings dropped again to 809,000 viewers and dropped to fifteenth position for the night. The final episode of Vanished, which screened on March 5, 2007, got 278,000 viewers.

In the United Kingdom, all the Vanished episodes aired on Channel Five in a late-night Sunday slot, averaging roughly 500,000 viewers per episode.
