= Change of Mind =

1969 film by Robert Stevens

- Film Poster
- Directed by: Robert Stevens
- Written by: Seeleg Lester; Dick Wesson
- Produced by: Seeleg Lester; Dick Wesson; Henry S. White
- Starring: Raymond St. Jacques; Susan Oliver; Janet MacLachlan; Leslie Nielsen
- Cinematography: Arthur J. Ornitz
- Edited by: Donald Ginsberg
- Music by: Duke Ellington and Orchestra
- Production company: Sagittarius Productions
- Distributed by: Cinerama Releasing Corporation
- Release date: 1969
- Running time: 98 Min.
- Country: United States
- Language: English
- Budget: $650,000

Change of Mind is a 1969 science fiction/drama film starring Raymond St. Jacques, Susan Oliver, Janet MacLachlan, and Leslie Nielsen.

== Plot ==
A married couple struggles to adjust when the husband, dying of cancer, has his brain transplanted into the body of a black man.

David Rowe (St. Jacques) is a white district attorney who must now live his life as a black man. His wife Margaret (Oliver) tries to deal with the transformation of her husband's appearance as David feels the stings of racial prejudice for the first time. She has trouble being intimate with the man she knows is still her husband.

Racist Sheriff Webb (Nielsen) is a local lawman who resents the district attorney, but after the sheriff is accused of killing his own black mistress, he must rely on David for his legal defense. Rowe investigates the murder of the young black woman while dealing with his superiors, friends and family treating him differently.

During his investigation, David has to deal with the moral quandary of releasing evidence that clears the Sheriff, knowing it will allow the Sheriff to continue to abuse minorities.

== Cast ==
- Raymond St. Jacques as David Rowe
- Susan Oliver as Margaret Rowe
- Janet MacLachlan as Elizabeth
- Leslie Nielsen as Sheriff Webb
- Donnelly Rhodes as Roger Morrow
- David Bailey as Tommy Benson
- Andre Womble as Scupper
- Clarice Taylor as Rose Landis
- Jack Creley as Bill Chambers
- Cosette Lee as Angela Rowe
- Larry Reynolds as Judge Forrest
- Hope Clarke as Nancy
- Rudy Challenger as Howard Culver
- Henry Ramer as Chief Enfield
- Joseph Shaw as Gov. LaTourette

== Production ==
The film was shot in Toronto.

== Reception ==
TV Guide found that the movie was gimmicky giving it one out of four stars. It did like the Duke Ellington soundtrack. Roger Ebert gave the movie 2.5 stars, stating that it tended to focus on the trial aspects of the movie rather than the main character's reaction to now being a black man. Ebert was pleased with the acting in the movie. In a review by Roger Greenspun of The New York Times it was found the movie failed to address any of the questions it was raising, and found the "pedestrian, sometimes conventionally audacious, direction " to be a hindrance. It did however praise the acting of St. Jacques and MacLachlan. The Encyclopedia of Science Fiction found the movie to be a rare treatment of racial issues in a science fiction film, nd that while the movie mostly succeeds, it did contain many crass lines of dialogue.

== Novelization ==
A novelization of the movie was released by Pyramid Books in 1969, written by Richard Hubbard under the pseudonym "Chris Stratton," which he employed for most of his tie-in work.

== See also ==
- List of American films of 1969
