= Criminal Passion =

1994 thriller film by Donna Deitch

- Directed by: Donna Deitch
- Written by: Max Strom; John Allen Nelson
- Produced by: Donald P. Borchers
- Starring: Joan Severance; Anthony Denison; John Allen Nelson
- Cinematography: Joey Forsyte
- Edited by: Robin Katz
- Music by: Wendy Blackstone
- Production company: Planet Productions
- Release date: September 21, 1994
- Running time: 96 minutes
- Country: United States
- Language: English

Criminal Passion (also known as Angel of Desire) is a 1994 American mystery erotic thriller film directed by Donna Deitch, starring Joan Severance, Anthony Denison, and John Allen Nelson. The plot follows a police detective who begins an affair with a murder suspect. It was released direct-to-video on September 21, 1994.

== Plot summary ==
Melanie Hudson is a police detective who asks to investigate the mysterious murder of a famous ballerina, who was slashed to death with a razor. She insists on working the case with Detective Nathan Leonard, her former boyfriend. The prime suspect is Connor Ashcroft, a womanizing architect and son of a U.S. senator. Melanie finds herself drawn to Connor's charms despite the ethical conflict of becoming involved with a suspect. Two other detectives, Mike Verutti and Jordan Monroe, are also working the case and discover Connor's disgruntled ex-girlfriend Tracy Perry, a sculptor with a violent history. Verutti is shot to death at Tracy's studio when he and Nathan try to arrest her.

Melanie is accosted in her home by a jealous Tracy, whom she's forced to kill. This leaves the leads on the ballerina case, as well as the murders of four women who dated Connor, unsolved. Monroe discovers fingerprints from Connor's live-in psychiatrist on a crime-scene glass, leading Connor's chauffeur to retract an alibi he'd provided for his boss. Nathan goes to the Ashcroft mansion, where Connor and Melanie are in bed together. When Connor begins brandishing his razor at Melanie and fires a gun at Nathan, Melanie realizes he is the killer and also murdered Verutti, with his therapist covering up his tracks.

== Cast ==
- Joan Severance as Melanie Hudson
- Anthony Denison as Nathan Leonard
- John Allen Nelson as Connor Ashcroft
- David Labiosa as Mike Verutti
- Rachel Ticotin as Tracy Perry
- Wolfgang Bodison as Jordan Monroe
- Shannon Wilcox as Joanne Pinder
- Henry Darrow as Captain Ramoz

== Release ==
Producer Donald P. Borchers released the film for free digital viewing on YouTube under the title Angel of Desire in 2021.

== Reception ==
Marjorie Baumgarten of The Austin Chronicle said the film lands in the "much-better-than-average category" of sexy crime thriller movies that populate video store shelves due to Deitch's direction, though she conceded "it often falls victim to some stunted plotting and acting". She concluded, "In the final analysis, Criminal Passion has more style than substance and, even then, the style often falls short of its mark. But this 1993 film, seemingly released straight-to-video, deserves a fate far better than this certain condemnation to obscurity."

TV Guide wrote, "Smokily sensual and genuinely erotic, Criminal Passion works better as an adult video than as a coherent psychological thriller", adding it gets "bogged down by confusing motivations, subplot congestion, quasi-tough gal narration, and an inability to provide enough viable suspects to keep the whodunit game in a spin". The reviewer praised the chemistry between Severance and Nelson, but said that making the character of Ashcroft more interesting than the female lead is a misstep.
