= Buck James =

American medical drama television series

- Genre: Medical drama
- Created by: Paul F. Edwards
- Starring: Dennis Weaver; Alberta Watson; Shannon Wilcox
- Composer: Barry Goldberg
- Country of origin: United States
- Original language: English
- No. of seasons: 1
- No. of episodes: 19

Production
- Executive producers: Robert E. Fuisz; Bill Storke
- Producers: David Abramowitz; Robert Birnbaum; Paul F. Edwards; GarnerSimmons
- Running time: 60 minutes
- Production companies: Robert E. Fuisz-William F. Storke Productions; Tri-Star Television (1987) (season 1); Columbia Pictures Television (1988) (season 1)

Original release
- Network: ABC
- Release: September 27, 1987 – May 5, 1988

Buck James is an American medical drama television series created by Paul F. Edwards that aired on ABC from September 27, 1987, until May 5, 1988.

== Premise ==
Buck James is a middle-aged surgeon at a hospital in Texas who also has a passion for ranching. James, a "hard-driving, daredevil, brilliant sort of fellow", is chief surgeon at Holloman University Hospital and head of one of its trauma units. In addition to his challenges at work, at home he has a son "who is going through all the usual painful gyrations of growing up" and a two-month-pregnant daughter who has separated from her husband and he had to deal with "a divorced wife who wouldn't let go."

The title character was based on real-life physician Red Duke. Star Dennis Weaver shadowed Duke at work (including being present during surgeries that Duke performed) to prepare for playing James, and Duke was a consultant on scripts for the show. Memorial Hermann Hospital in Houston, where Duke practiced, was the location for filming of the show's pilot.

Buck James was broadcast from 10 to 11 p.m. Eastern Time on Sundays on ABC from September 27, 1987, until January 10, 1988. and from 10 to 11 p.m. Eastern Time on Thursdays on ABC from March 10, 1988, until May 5, 1988. It was produced by Entertainment Partners in association with Tri-Star Television.

== Cast ==
- Dennis Weaver as Buck James
- Alberta Watson as Rebecca Meyer
- Shannon Wilcox as Jenny James
- Jon Maynard Pennell as Clint James
- Dehl Berti as Vittorio
- John Cullum as Henry Carliner
- Elena Stitiler as Dinah James
- Perry Anzilotti as Myron

== Episodes ==
No.	Title	Directed by	Written by	Original release date
1	"Pilot" "Heart of Texas"	Rick Wallace	Paul F. Edwards	September 27, 1987
Buck's unmarried daughter returns, and he has to deal with hospital politics.
2	"Sins of the Father"	Rick Wallace	David Abramowitz	October 4, 1987
A dying boy has parents whose religious beliefs prohibits transfusions.
3	"Too Close to Home"	Rick Wallace	David Abramowitz	October 11, 1987
Jenny's mother has a stroke. An argument between a group of ranchers and a bank turns into a hit-and-run.
4	"Absalom, Absalom"	Don Weis	Paul F. Edwards	November 1, 1987
Kyle finds out that an old girlfriend has AIDS.
5	"A Question of Loyalty"	Win Phelps	Art Monterastelli	November 8, 1987
Rebecca and a trauma surgeon has a standoff at the hospital.
6	"And Keep Them From Harm"	Mimi Leder	Paul F. Edwards	November 15, 1987
Rebecca performs an elective hysterectomy and is criticized. Torio is discriminated against because of his race.
7	"Silent Partners"	Jan Eliasberg	Garner Simmons	November 22, 1987
Buck has to persuade a man, who has a daughter with down syndrome, to undergo a risky operation.
8	"The Last Ride"	Don Weis	Syrie Astrahan James	December 13, 1987
Clint's best friend is almost killed in a rodeo accident. Rebecca gets offered a job at a hospital in New York.
9	"Let Nothing You Dismay"	Michael Fresco	Paul F. Edwards & Garner Simmons	December 20, 1987
Dinah and Clint are both depressed during the holidays. A little girl brings Christmas joy to the hospital.
10	"The Good Samatarian"	Jerry Jameson	Garner Simmons	January 3, 1988
Buck has to operate on a woman in difficult labor. Dinah's ex-boyfriend returns to try and win her heart.
11	"Almost Perfect"	Mimi Leder	David Abramovitz	January 10, 1988
It is revealed that Dinah's unborn baby has a deformity. Rebecca's grandparents has problems with her new boyfriend who isn't jewish.
12	"Lives in the Balance"	Sigmund Neufeld, Jr.	Garner Simmons	March 10, 1988
Buck finds out that a dying boy is the perfect heart donor for a sick child.
13	"The Bottom Line"	Don Weis	David Abramovitz	March 17, 1988
Buck is in a collision with a drunken driver on a highway.
14	"Act of Aggression"	David Jackson	David Jackson	March 24, 1988
Clint is sent to jail because of a practical joke. Buck is called in to save the life of a prisoner who is scheduled for execution.
15	"Quality of Life"	Michael Fresco	Art Monterastelli	March 31, 1988
A friend of Buck decides to forgo technology that could save his life. Rebecca has doubts about her chief-residency post.
16	"Top Secret"	Joel Rosenzweig	Josef Anderson	April 7, 1988
A cover-up by an airplane manufacturer is behind a poorly designed plane.
17	"To Everything a Season"	Mimi Leder	Paul F. Edwards	April 14, 1988
Buck has an argument with a burn specialist. Clint wants to take a job in the oil industry instead of going to college.
18	"Heal Thyself"	Don Weis	David Abramowitz	April 28, 1988
A mysterious illness affects Buck's performance.
19	"The Requiem"	Win Phelps	Unknown	May 5, 1988
Buck and Les Grant argue over the hospital's budget, but before they reach an agreement, Grant is shot.
