= Steve Levitt (actor) =

American actor (born 1960)

- Born: Steve Howard Levitt; February 29, 1960 (age 65); Santa Monica, California, U.S.
- Occupation(s): Actor, screenwriter
- Years active: 1977–1991, 2020–present

Steve Levitt (born February 29, 1960) is an American actor and screenwriter who has appeared in films and on television. He is a graduate of The Juilliard School. He is best known for his role in the 1987 movie Hunk as Bradley Brinkman and a recurring role in the Showtime TV series The Paper Chase.

== Career ==
Levitt's first feature film was in the 1980 movie Those Lips, Those Eyes, he also appeared in the 1983 comedy movie Private School as a bellboy. He appeared in the 1986 film Last Resort and The Experts in 1989.

Levitt has starred in TV movies such as Bill (1981), Malibu (1983), The Incredible Hulk Returns (1988) as Donald Blake, and Get Smart, Again! (1989). He starred in the short lived TV series The Boys as Gil.

Levitt jumped behind the camera in 1993, writing and directing a 30-minute film entitled Deaf Heaven about the AIDS crisis. He followed that up by penning the Val Kilmer film At First Sight (1999). He went on to write scripts for almost all major studios before retiring in 2011.

== Personal life ==
Levitt is a Buddhist teacher and chaplain at the Cedars-Sinai Medical Center in Los Angeles.

== Filmography ==
=== Film ===
Year	Title	Role	Notes
1980	Those Lips, Those Eyes	Westervelt	
1982	Airplane II: The Sequel	Creature #1	
1983	Private School	Bellboy	
1986	Last Resort	Pierre	
1987	Hunk	Bradley Brinkman	
1988	Blue Movies	Buzz	
1989	The Experts	Gil	

=== Television ===
Year	Title	Role	Notes
1981	Father Murphy	Philbert Potts	Episode: "The Ghost of Gold Hill"
1981	Bill	Student	Television film
1983	Malibu	Groopy	Television film
1984	Partners in Crime	Michael	Episode: "Pilot"
1984, 1986	Hardcastle and McCormick	Ivan / Peter Trigg	2 episodes
1984–1986	The Paper Chase	Stotz	14 episodes
1987	CBS Summer Playhouse	Little Bud Stone	Episode: "Puppetman"
1988	227	Glenn Gibson	Episode: "My Aching Back"
1988	The Incredible Hulk Returns	Donald Blake	Television film
1988–1989	The Boys	Sandy	3 episodes
1989	Get Smart, Again!	Beamish	Television film
1991	Danger Team	Chris Norman	Television film
