= List of Vanished characters =

This is a list of the main characters and fictional politicians from the short-lived Fox television show Vanished.

== Jeffrey Collins ==
Jeffrey Collins is a fictional character in the American television series Vanished, portrayed by actor John Allen Nelson. Within the series, Collins is depicted as a Republican Senator from Georgia.

Throughout the first season, Collins struggles over whether to confirm Judge Wallace Rainer to the Supreme Court, suspecting that Rainer is part of a conspiracy and using the kidnapping of Collins' wife, Sara, as leverage. When Collins believes that Sara has been killed, he initially refuses to confirm the nomination. However, FBI Agent Graham Kelton later informs him that the apparent murder scene was staged.

Believing he will vote against the nomination, Collins is confronted by a kidnapper named Morrel, who threatens to kill Sara in front of him. Under duress, Collins agrees to support the nomination, but is shocked when Sara is not released afterward. He later learns from Agent Daniel Lucas that the kidnapping is part of a wider plot, with the ultimate goal of freeing a death-row inmate capable of deciphering a critical message for the conspirators.

== Marcy Collins ==
Marcy Collins is the daughter of Senator Collins and Sara's stepdaughter. Her boyfriend, Ben Wilson, is arrested in connection with Sara's disappearance. Marcy helps capture Ben but later bails him out, believing he was framed, with the money provided by her mother. She was pregnant but suffered a miscarriage. Marcy suspects that Judge Rainer might have caused the miscarriage by slipping her something. She only reveals to Ben, after the miscarriage, that Judge Rainer could possibly be the father.

== Max Collins ==
Max Collins is the son of Senator Jeffrey Collins and Sara's stepson. Max is a troubled teen, and after getting caught stealing and crashing one of his father's cars under the influence Sara sent him to a rehab facility. Later in the series, a video showing his dislike of Sara is played in her cell.

== Sara Collins ==
Sara Collins is the second wife of Senator Jeffrey Collins, and her disappearance spurs the events that drive the plot of the series. Prior to her abduction Sara was a Kindergarten teacher. She met Jeffrey Collins when he visited the school as part of his senatorial campaign. After the event Jeffrey asked her out on a date. While his campaign often interfered with their schedule, Jeffrey eventually proposed to Sara. She accepted and they got married. Many people credited Jeffrey's subsequent win to his marriage to Sara boosting his image as a family man. Later, she became an owner of a charity centered towards helping troubled children. Before she disappeared, she sent her stepson, Max, to a rehab facility. Unbeknownst to Jeffery, this was the same facility that she was sent to as a teenager. While there she was tortured, but was able to escape.

Following Sara's abduction, the FBI opened an investigation, with Special Agent Graham Kelton called in to head the case. They soon discover that Sara's abduction is part of a wider conspiracy. While being held captive people try to turn her against Jeffrey for unknown reasons. At the end of the show she goes to her former lover, Peter Manning, telling him she had "no other place to go." Sara's ultimate fate, due to the ending of the series, is unknown.

== Graham Kelton ==
Graham Kelton was the lead FBI investigator in the disappearance of Sara. Before the Collins case he helped find Nathen Miller. However while delivering ransom to the kidnapper, the kidnapper pulled an explosive device killing Nathen Miller and critically injuring Kelton. He spent almost a year in the hospital, leaving him in a coma for 4 months. He returned to work few weeks before Sara Collins vanished. When it was believed that Sara Collins was dead, Kelton was forced to take a leave of absence from his position. After realizing that Sara was alive, Kelton tried to alert Senator Collins but was shot. The last thing he saw before he died was a hallucination of Sara over him. He received FBI honors after his death, including having his picture added to the Wall of Martyrs.

In the television show Bones a character named Graham Kelton is called "a creep" by Special Agent Seeley Booth. Graham Kelton had apparently the best chair at the F.B.I., however, like Graham Kelton, this turned out to be a dud. This is likely a reference to Vanished, seeing as creator Josh Berman was also a writer on Bones.

== Daniel Lucas ==
Daniel Lucas, portrayed by Eddie Cibrian, is the Special Supervisory Agent for the FBI Criminal Investigations Unit, a group located at the agency's Washington D.C. headquarters. He is an old acquaintance of FBI investigator Agent Graham Kelton, as they graduated from the FBI's training academy together. After Kelton was murdered by Edward Morell, Lucas was transferred to Atlanta to lead the investigation in the Sara's case and bring Kelton's murderer to justice.

== Lin Mei ==
Lin Mei, portrayed by Ming-Na, is an FBI Agent stationed in the Atlanta, Georgia office and investigated the disappearance of Sara. Mei is a field agent who was partnered with Agent Kelton until his death. Even though she was offered the choice to leave, she decided to remain on the case. She then joined up with new lead investigator Agent Lucas. Throughout the rest of the series, she expressed the desire to avenge Graham's death.

== Judy Nash ==
Judy Nash is a reporter investigating the disappearance of Sara.

== Adam Putnam ==
Adam Putnam is a cameraman working with Judy Nash investigating the missing Sara Collins, and is also her lover. He later breaks up with her when she shows distrust in him and is never seen again.

== Michael Tyner ==
Michael Tyner served as the head of the FBI's Atlanta field office as well as an overseer to the Sara's case throughout the series. In a plot twist in the last episode, it is revealed that he is part of the Masonic conspiracy.

== Ben Wilson ==
Ben Wilson is the boyfriend of Marcy Collins. Ben has a criminal record; he spent 4 years in juvenile hall for beating up and robbing a man, 3 months for vandalism and 8 years for drug dealing. Ben met Marcy while working as a cater-waiter for a Christmas party at the Collins estate. Ben was arrested on suspicion of being involved in Sara's disappearance, He was bailed out of jail by Marcy's mother, although the money came from Senator Collins' deputy as a payoff for Marcy's mother to disappear. Marcy told Ben that she was pregnant with his child, although it appears the father could also have been Judge Rainer, as he and Marcy had had an affair few months before. At the end of the last episode he broke into Wallace Rainer's townhouse and shot him.

== List of fictional politicians in the series ==
=== Senators voting for Judge Wallace Rainer ===
- Senator Richard Mazarra (R-Senate Judiciary Committee Chairman) South Carolina
- Senator Diana Carroll (D) New Mexico
- Senator Jessica Kerman (R) Alabama
- Senator Michael Patterson (D) Alaska
- Senator Lauch MacDonald (R) Michigan
- Senator Mack Wellton (D) Vermont
- Senator Bob Sexington (D) Wyoming
- Senator Roy Buckdonis (D) Delaware
- Senator Joe Wellson (R) Ohio
- Senator Jeffrey Collins (R) Georgia
  - Elected in 1998.

=== Senators voting against Judge Wallace Rainer ===
- Senator Kristin Stratton (D) Indiana
- Senator Patricia Houston (R) Texas
- Senator Helene Coleman (R) Nebraska
- Senator Lynn Taos-Kahn (R) Kansas
- Senator Benjamin Lassiter (R) New York
- Senator Jon Cunningham (D) Montana
- Senator Kyl Ventress (R) Arizona
- Senator Ellery Bultman (D) Arkansas

=== Others ===
- Senator Lincoln Daley (R-Texas)
- Former Senator Eugene Collins (R-Georgia)
  - Served in the Senate for 4 terms or 24 years. He was the Chairman of the Intelligence Committee.
    - Elected in 1962 and served through 1987.

=== Representatives ===
- Representative Allen Leonard (R-Georgia)
- Representative Warren Upton (D-Georgia)

=== Mayors ===
- Mayor Curtis McNeal (D-Atlanta, Georgia)

=== Supreme Court ===
- Justice Wallace Rainer
  - Assassinated by Ben Wilson
- Justice Alexander Thomas
- Justice Gil Prescott
- Justice Elizabeth Mulright

=== Cabinet members ===
- Deputy Attorney General Robert Rubia

=== Other politicians ===
The following is a list of politicians who died in office because of a plane crash.

- Governor Mel Carnahan (D-Missouri)
- Senator Jack Wellstrom (D-Minnesota)
- Senator Hugh Cullen (R-Wyoming)
- Senator Christine Turner (R-Louisiana)
