= List of films featuring the United States Marine Corps =

This is a list of films featuring the United States Marine Corps.

== History of Marines in film ==
Beginning with The Star Spangled Banner (1918), the Marines discovered the use of motion pictures. In exchange for a favorable portrayal that stimulated recruiting and gave an impressive view to the public and Congress, the Marines provided uniformed extras, locations, equipment, and technical advisers that provided their expertise to the producers. In 1926 MGM's Tell It to the Marines and Fox's What Price Glory? directed by Raoul Walsh nearly led to a court battle to see whether one studio could copyright the Marines to prevent other films from being made. Allan Dwan's Sands of Iwo Jima, starring John Wayne, is frequently cited as one of the most influential Marine films. Over the years, Camp Pendleton was dressed up to represent Central American nations, China, Pacific islands, New Zealand, and Joseph H. Lewis's Retreat, Hell! had the base covered in studio snow with their hills and roads painted white. Camp Pendleton later doubled as Vietnam in Marshall Thompson's To the Shores of Hell. When filming Battle Cry at the base in 1954, Raoul Walsh's Marine technical adviser said that he had joined the Corps after seeing What Price Glory?. United States Marine Corps Recruit Training was also depicted in Jack Webb's The D.I. and Stanley Kubrick's Full Metal Jacket that led to more enlistments to the Corps. Most recently, the Gulf and Iraq wars have become the subject of controversial films such as Jarhead and Generation Kill.

== List of films ==
Title	Director	Notable cast	Summary	Released	Notes
6th Marine Division on Okinawa	United States Marine Corps		The film details the actions of the 6th Marine Division during the Battle of Okinawa, released shortly after the event.	1945	
The Rock	Michael Bay	Nicolas Cage, Sean Connery, Ed Harris	The film's protagonists accompany a team of Navy SEALs to Alcatraz Island to stop an attack by rogue U.S. Force Recon Marines on San Francisco.	1996	
All the Young Men	Hall Bartlett	Sidney Poitier, Alan Ladd	The film depicts a fictional unit of Korean War Marines in 1951 and explores the recent racial integration of the Marine Corps. Sgt Towler, an African American, struggles to assert his authority over the platoon, who express their preference for the Caucasian Sgt. Kincaid.	1960	
Battle Cry	Raoul Walsh	Van Heflin, Aldo Ray, James Whitmore, Nancy Olson	Based on the novel by Leon Uris, the film follows a group of Marines that join the 6th Marine Regiment during World War II. The communications company comes together to fight in the battles of Guadalcanal, Tarawa, and Saipan.	1955	
Battle for Haditha	Nick Broomfield		The film is based on the Haditha killings in November 2005, where Marines killed 24 individuals, at least 15 of which were non-combatants.	2008	
Battle: Los Angeles	Jonathan Liebesman	Aaron Eckhart, Ramón Rodríguez	The film follows a platoon of Marines from 2nd Battalion 5th Marines, defending against an alien invasion in Los Angeles, and eventually crack the secret to destroying command centers worldwide.	2011	
Born on the Fourth of July	Oliver Stone	Tom Cruise	Film adaptation of the autobiography of Ron Kovic, dealing with his service in the Vietnam War, in particular his post-traumatic stress disorder and feelings of the betrayal of Vietnam veterans by the American government. Disabled shortly after friendly fire kills a young Marine, Kovic endures neglect at a VA hospital and becomes disillusioned. Being disgusted with the government, he joins Vietnam Veterans Against the War and protests at the 1972 Republican National Convention.	1989	Awards: 2 Oscars, 4 Golden Globes, 5 other major awards
The Boys in Company C	Sidney J. Furie	Stan Shaw, Andrew Stevens, R. Lee Ermey	This film follows five Marines from boot camp to a tour of duty in the Vietnam War in 1968. Disheartened by futile combat, corruption, and incompetence, the five seek a way out. They are told that if they can defeat a rival soccer team, they can spend the rest of their tour playing exhibition games behind the lines.	1978	
Brothers	Jim Sheridan	Tobey Maguire, Jake Gyllenhaal, Natalie Portman	A remake of a 2004 Danish film, Captain Sam Cahill (Maguire) is a presumed-dead prisoner of the War in Afghanistan who struggles while reintegrating into society following his sudden release from captivity	2009	Awards: 2 Golden Globe Nominations
The D.I.	Jack Webb	Jack Webb, Don Dubbins	Based on the teleplay The Murder of a Sand Flea, Sgt Jim Moore attempts to train the troublesome Pvt Owens. Driven to frustration, Capt Anderson gives Moore three days to turn Owens into a satisfactory recruit.	1957	
Death Before Dishonor	Terry Leonard	Fred Dryer	Gunnery Sergeant Burns is the head of the Marine Security Guard detachment of an American embassy in the Middle East when it is captured by terrorists. He mounts a one-man operation to defeat the terrorists and free their hostages.	1987	
Ears, Open. Eyeballs, Click.	Canaan Brunley		This fly on the wall documentary shows the experiences of Marine recruits during United States Marine Corps Recruit Training at Marine Corps Recruit Depot San Diego, California.	2005	
A Few Good Men	Rob Reiner	Tom Cruise, Jack Nicholson, Demi Moore, Kevin Bacon	Based on the play of the same name by Aaron Sorkin, this film follows the efforts of Navy lawyer LTJG Kaffee as he defends two young Marines undergoing court-martial for the murder of a third Marine. Ultimately, he uncovers a conspiracy to cover up the death and proves that his clients were scapegoats for some high-ranking officers.	1992	Awards: 4 Oscars, 5 Golden Globes
Flags of Our Fathers	Clint Eastwood	Ryan Phillippe, Jesse Bradford, Adam Beach	Based on the book by James Bradley and Ron Powers, the film follows Marines depicted in the photograph Raising the Flag on Iwo Jima who survived the battle of Iwo Jima, and their subsequent lives. The actual battle is depicted in medias res through flashbacks. The complementary film Letters from Iwo Jima depicted the battle from the Japanese point of view.	2006	
Flying Leathernecks	Nicholas Ray	John Wayne, Robert Ryan	In this film, Major Kirby takes command of the fictional Marine fighter squadron VMF-247, part of the Cactus Air Force in the Guadalcanal campaign. Butting heads with Captain Griffin, Kirby suffers emotionally with his decisions to place the mission above the lives of his men. After helping to win the battle with his low-level attack tactics, he leads the squadron to the Battle of Okinawa, and after witnessing Griffin place the mission over the life of his brother-in-law, willingly relinquishes command.	1951	Kirby is based on Medal of Honor recipient and ace John Lucian Smith.
Full Metal Jacket	Stanley Kubrick	Matthew Modine, R. Lee Ermey, Vincent D'Onofrio	Based on the semi-autobiographical novel The Short-Timers by Gustav Hasford, this film portrays recruit training and the Vietnam War from the point of view of James "Joker" Davis. At boot camp, GySgt Hartman proves to be a vicious drill instructor, and after becoming frustrated by misfit Leonard "Pyle" Lawrence, assigns Joker to bring him up to par. On the night of graduation, Pyle murders his drill instructor and commits suicide. Later, in Vietnam, Joker is a combat correspondent covering the Tet Offensive and Battle of Huế, ultimately killing a wounded sniper to prove himself.	1987	Awards: 5 total
Generation Kill	Susanna White & Simon Cellan Jones	Alexander Skarsgård, Lee Tergesen	This HBO miniseries, based on the book written by Evan Wright, details the 1st Reconnaissance Battalion in the 2003 invasion of Iraq. Focusing on the Marines of Second Platoon, Bravo Company, they suffer from boredom, frustration, and ultimately perform missions unlike those they trained for. As they battle from Kuwait to Baghdad, they deal with the usual confusion and chaos of war, exacerbated by their senior officers' often surreal behavior.	2008	Few fictional liberties have been taken, however, some of the Marines depicted have disputed the accuracy of their portrayal.
The Great Santini	Lewis John Carlino	Robert Duvall	Based on the novel of the same name, Marine fighter pilot LtCol Wilbur Meechum juggles success as an aviator with his failures as a father and husband. His son Ben's struggle to win his father's acceptance mirrors the author Pat Conroy's relationship with his father, Donald.	1979	
Guadalcanal Diary	Lewis Seiler	Preston Foster, Lloyd Nolan	The film, based on the book of the same name by Richard Tregaskis, recounts the United States Marines in the Battle of Guadalcanal, only a year before the movie's release.	1943	
Gung Ho!	Ray Enright	Randolph Scott	The story is loosely based on the Makin Island raid in 1942. Led by LtCol Thorwald (based on Evans Carlson), the 2nd Marine Raider Battalion gathers volunteers for a mission to divert Japanese attention from the landings at Guadalcanal and Tulagi. Launching from the submarines USS Nautilus and Argonaut, they land on Makin and destroy the Japanese garrison.	1943	
Halls of Montezuma	Lewis Milestone	Richard Widmark	The film follows Lt Anderson and his Marines from the beach of an unidentified island (possibly Saipan) to a Japanese rocket site through enemy-infested jungles. Anderson, an ex-school teacher, struggles with the responsibilities he holds, but ultimately overcomes and leads his remaining men to victory.	1951	
Heartbreak Ridge	Clint Eastwood	Clint Eastwood	This film follows GySgt Tom Highway, a Medal of Honor recipient who is nearing retirement as he returns to an infantry unit. He's placed in charge of the unruly and undertrained reconnaissance platoon. He unifies and trains his men despite the disapproval of his unit commander, who dislikes the "dinosaur" Highway and deliberately neglects the recon platoon, and leads them during the 1983 Invasion of Grenada. Highway also attempt to reconnect with his ex-wife Aggie, who bitterly resents their failed marriage, and is ultimately successful.	1986	Shot at Camp Pendleton.
Heaven Knows, Mr. Allison	John Huston	Robert Mitchum, Deborah Kerr	A marine and a nun form an unlikely friendship. The marine is shipwrecked on a Pacific island and the nun has been left behind there; the two come to rely on one another's support as they evade the Japanese.	1957	Nominated for 2 Oscars
Here Come the Marines	William Beaudine	Leo Gorcey, Huntz Hall, Hanley Stafford	In this slapstick comedy, The Bowery Boys get drafted. On the first day of training, Sach becomes a sergeant due to a family connection. While on the drill field, they discover the body of a dead Marine, and trace the murder back to a local gambling ring. They engage in some humorous fisticuffs, and break up the illicit gang.	1952	
Jarhead	Sam Mendes	Jake Gyllenhaal, Jamie Foxx	Based on the memoir by Anthony Swofford, this film depicts his experiences as a Marine Scout Sniper during the Gulf War. Goaded by SSgt Sykes into becoming a sniper, Swofford develops an obsession with the concept of the perfect shot. As the unit deploys to Saudi Arabia, they become frustrated with boredom, monotony, anxiety, and act out; one incident involving moonshine and a fire gets Swofford demoted. As the war finally starts, an artillery bombardment, friendly fire incident, and walk past the Highway of Death unsettle the Marines. Swofford and his spotter finally receive a sniper mission, but are denied permission to fire at the last moment. When they return to their unit, they find the war is over, having never fired a shot.	2005	Gyllenhaal received an award for his role in this and two other films.
Major Payne	Nick Castle	Damon Wayans	This comedy follows the life of Maj Payne, a recently discharged Marine, who decides to take charge of a disorderly high school cadet corps in an attempt to regain active Marine status. He clashes with a school counselor who attempts to soften his harsh disciplinary ways. Initially unpopular, Payne inspires the young troops to win the Virginia Military Games by turning down an opportunity to return to the Corps in favor of staying with the group.	1995	
The Marines Are Coming	David Howard	William Haines, Conrad Nagel, Esther Ralston	A brash marine is assigned to a new post which is now under the command of his former rival. The marine falls in love with his commanding officer's fiancée and romances her away from him. The day before their wedding, the fiancée calls it off after the marine is involved with an incident in Tijuana. The fiancée leaves for Central America to join her father, who is a diplomat, and the disgraced marine quits but re-enlists as a private. Assigned to a post in Central America, the marine discovers he must rescue his rival, who has been captured by the rebels plotting to overthrow the territorial governor, her former fiancée's father.	1934	
The Marines Fly High	George Nicholls, Jr. and Ben Stoloff	Richard Dix, Chester Morris, Lucille Ball	In 1939, the Central American cocoa plantation owned by American Joan Grant (Lucille Ball) needs protection from bandits led by El Vengador (John Eldredge). She asks the Marines stationed nearby under the command of Colonel Hill (Paul Harvey) for help. Lieutenants Danny Darrick (Richard Dix) and Jim Malone (Chester Morris) fly a mission to seek out the outlaws. Although they have orders to protect her, both men vie for Joan's affection.	1940	
Marines, Let's Go	Raoul Walsh	Tom Tryon, David Hedison	This slapstick follows a group of Marines on shore leave in Japan, which subsequently get cancelled due to the outbreak of the Korean War.	1961	
The Outsider	Delbert Mann	Tony Curtis	Follows the story of Ira Hayes, who fights in World War II and helps to raise the flag at the Battle of Iwo Jima.	1961	
The Pacific	multiple	Joseph Mazzello, Jon Seda, James Badge Dale, William Sadler	In a manner similar to its sister production Band of Brothers, the 10-episode miniseries follows Marines in the Pacific Theater of Operations. It is primarily based upon the stories of John Basilone, Eugene Sledge (With the Old Breed), and Robert Leckie (Helmet for My Pillow).	2010	
Pride of the Marines	Delmer Daves	John Garfield, Eleanor Parker	This biographical film tells the story of Al Schmid's heroic stand against a Japanese attack during the Battle of Guadalcanal, in which he was blinded by a grenade, and his subsequent rehabilitation.	1945	
Retreat, Hell!	Joseph H. Lewis	Frank Lovejoy, Richard Carlson, Peter J. Ortiz	Detailing the 1st Marine Division in the Korean War, this film ranges from the landings at Inchon to the Battle of Chosin Reservoir. Warner Bros. proposed the film during the latter battle.	1952	
Rules of Engagement	William Friedkin	Tommy Lee Jones, Samuel L. Jackson	This legal drama depicts the court-martial of Colonel Terry Childers and his defense attorney, Colonel Hays Hodges. After defending the American embassy in Yemen in which 83 civilians are killed, the court martial hinges on if Childers broke the eponymous rules of engagement. After proving that the National Security Advisor destroyed evidence, as well as recanting an incident in the Vietnam War where Childers executed a man to save Hodges, Childers is found not guilty.	2000	The lead writer, Jim Webb, is a noted author, former Secretary of the Navy, and former United States Senator from Virginia.
Salute to the Marines	S. Sylvan Simon	Wallace Beery	Retired SgtMaj William Bailey leads a heroic defense when the Japanese attack the Philippines, first by strangling a Nazi agent and then dies in his dress uniform while destroying a bridge.	1943	
Sands of Iwo Jima	Allan Dwan	John Wayne, John Agar, many notable Marines	This epic film depicts Sgt John Stryker and Pvt Peter Conway through the Battles of Tarawa and Iwo Jima. Initially disliking their squad leader, the Marines gradually grow to respect him, eventually finding an emotional letter written to his son after his death.	1949	The first recorded use of the phrase "lock and load". President Harry S. Truman referred to this film when saying that the Corps had a "propaganda machine bigger than Joseph Stalin's".
Second in Command	Simon Fellows	Jean-Claude Van Damme	15 Marines and a SEAL commander fend off an insurgent terror attack on the US Embassy in the fictional nation of Moldavia, using ruses and strategic maneuvering.	2006	
Severe Clear	Kristian Fraga		As part of the first wave in the War on Terror, First Lieutenant Mike Scotti served on the front lines during the 21-day advance to Baghdad. His experiences in Afghanistan as well as Iraq put him face to face with the sobering realities of war on a daily basis. This documentary offers an unflinching look at life on the battlefield through the eyes of someone who was there.	2009	
The Siege of Firebase Gloria	Brian Trenchard-Smith	Wings Hauser, R. Lee Ermey	A patrol of Marines visits Firebase Gloria at the beginning of the Tet Offensive, and is trapped by a Viet Cong siege. After successfully defending the base, the Marines are subsequently forced to abandon it, having lost too many men during the battle. The VC commander then learns that his orders were not to win, but to die with his unit and allow the North Vietnamese Army to take over the Vietnam War.	1989	Trenchard-Smith has stated that though uncredited, Ermey actually wrote the film.
Taking Chance	Ross Katz	Kevin Bacon	Based on the true story written by Lt Col Michael Strobl, the film depicts the aftermath of PFC Chance Phelps's death in the Iraq War. Frustrated at having been kept out of the fighting, Strobl volunteers to escort Phelp's remains from Dover Air Force Base to his parents in Dubois, Wyoming.	2009	
Tarawa Beachhead	Paul Wendkos	Kerwin Mathews, Julie Adams, Ray Danton	Sgt. Tom Sloan sees his Lieutenant Joel Brady kill one of their own Marines, Johnny Campbell on Guadalcanal after Brady led a disastrous suicidal attack against Japanese entrenched in caves. As the only survivors of the debacle, Sloan doesn't turn Brady in as he assumes no one will believe his word against an officer's. With Brady's recommendation, Sloan is later commissioned and assigned as an aide to a general (Onslow Stevens) back in the 2nd Marine Division headquarters in New Zealand. The film contains extensive amounts of actual footage of the Battle of Tarawa	1958	The Marine Corps refused to cooperate due to theme of officer killing his own men and sergeant bent on revenge.
Tell It to the Marines	George Hill	Lon Chaney, Sr., William Haines	This silent film depicts Sergeant O'Hara's difficulty in training recruits, particularly "Skeets" Burns, who develops a relationship with nurse Norma Dale, whom O'Hara is secretly attracted to. After an indiscretion in the Philippines turns her against him and causes friction between the two Marines, the nurse is ordered to Hangchow and becomes a hostage. The Marines battle with Chinese bandits, and after becoming friends, Skeet discharges and awaits his lover to return home.	1926	Filmed at Camp Pendleton, this was the first of many films shot with the Corp's cooperation.
To the Shores of Hell	Will Zens	Marshall Thompson, Richard Arlen, Robert Dornan	In this film, Major Donahue travels through Vietnam during the war to rescue his physician brother Gary, a prisoner of the Viet Cong. The film features footage of an amphibious exercise at Camp Pendleton.	1966	
To the Shores of Iwo Jima	United States Marine Corps		Following Marines and sailors through the Battle of Iwo Jima in rough chronological order, this film details aspects from the bombardment of the island by warships and carrier-based airplanes to the final breakdown of resistance. The film also features the video of the second flag raising shot by Sgt Bill Genaust.	1945	
Tribes	Joseph Sargent	Darren McGavin, Earl Holliman, Jan-Michael Vincent	This television film follows a group of Vietnam War recruits and their drill instructors. Among the new recruits is Adrian, a pacifist hippie and reluctant draftee. Though he conflicts with GySgt Drake, he earns his drill instructors respect as a natural leader and find common ground in Drake's hobby of drawing. Drake's superior, MSgt DePayster, fails Adrian for attitude issues, despite his capabilities and Drake's objections. Drake accuses him of going behind his back to fuel a personal vendetta, and defiantly posts one of his drawings. The night after being denied graduation, Adrian deserts from his disciplinary platoon.	1970	Awards: 3 Primetime Emmy Awards Known as The Soldier Who Declared Peace in Europe.
Wake Island	John Farrow	Brian Donlevy, Macdonald Carey,	This film details the Battle of Wake Island, following the attack on Pearl Harbor. Erroneously, the Americans are depicted as refusing to surrender, as well as the fictional death of Winfield S. Cunningham, the commander.	1942	
What Price Glory?	Raoul Walsh	Edmund Lowe, Victor McLaglen, Dolores del Río	Both films share a plot with the 1924 play of the same name by Maxwell Anderson and Laurence Stallings. Capt Flagg and 1stSgt Quirt lead a company of Marines in France during World War I, but their long-standing rivalry continues as they vie for the romantic attentions of Charmaine, a local innkeeper's daughter.	1926	Sequels include The Cock-Eyed World, Women of All Nations, Hot Pepper, and Call Out the Marines, and cameo in The Stolen Jools.
What Price Glory?	John Ford	James Cagney, Dan Dailey	Both films share a plot with the 1924 play of the same name by Maxwell Anderson and Laurence Stallings. Capt Flagg and 1stSgt Quirt lead a company of Marines in France during World War I, but their long-standing rivalry continues as they vie for the romantic attentions of Charmaine, a local innkeeper's daughter.	1952	
When Eagles Strike	Cirio H. Santiago	Christian Boeving, Stacy Keach	Some American commandos get a mission to save American politicians who were kidnapped and are held on a forgotten Malaysian island. Tough-guy lieutenant Andrew Peers commands the action. During the mission it's revealed there's a traitor in the team. Consequently, American soldiers are betrayed and captured by the opponents, who then interrogate and brutally torture team's lead Andrew.	2003	
Windtalkers	John Woo	Nicolas Cage, Adam Beach, Christian Slater	Due to his heroism at the Guadalcanal campaign, Sgt Joe Enders hides a hearing problem to get an assignment protecting Navajo code talker Ben Yazzie. During the Battle of Saipan, Yazzie is unnerved and disgusted with the violence, but uses his code to call for naval gunfire. Enders later kills Charlie Whitehorse, another code talker, to prevent his capture, earning Yazzie's fury. Later, Yazzie fearlessly fights, but begs Enders to kill him when capture seems imminent. Enders refuses, and sacrifices himself to save the code talker.	2002	
A Yank in Viet-Nam	Marshall Thompson	Marshall Thompson, Enrique Magalona, Mario Barri, Kieu Chinh	A U.S. Marine Corps pilot is shot down over the Vietnamese jungle. During his trek to American lines, he meets a female guerrilla fighter and a nationalist named Hong.	1964	Filmed in Vietnam
Beachhead	Stuart Heisler	Tony Curtis, Mary Murphy	Four Marines must find a French colonialist and his daughter to obtain to intelligence on Japanese defenses prior to the start of the Bougainville campaign.	1954	
South Pacific	Joshua Logan	Mitzi Gaynor, John Kerr	A WWII film based on the Rodgers and Hammerstein musical of the same name. USMC Lt Joe Cable (Kerr) seeks the assistance of a local French colonialist in love with a Navy Nurse (Gaynor) to gain intelligence on a neighboring Japanese held island.	1958	Nominated for three Academy Awards, winning one for Best Sound
Beach Red	Cornel Wilde	Rip Torn	Depicts a landing by the Marine Corps on an unnamed Japanese-held Pacific island, based on Peter Bowman's 1945 novella of the same name,	1967	Features stock footage taken during the Pacific War
Sniper	Luis Llosa	Tom Berenger, Billy Zane	The first in a series of films centering upon the character of MGySgt Thomas Beckett (Berenger), a Force Reconnaissance Scout Sniper.	1993	Has spawned 9 direct-to-video sequels to date.
Shooter	Antoine Fuqua	Mark Wahlberg	A Force Recon Marine Scout Sniper Bob Lee Swagger (Wahlberg), is framed for murder by a private military firm. Based on the 1993 novel Point of Impact by Stephen Hunter.	2007	Was also developed into the 2016 TV series of the same name
The Marine	John Bonito	John Cena	When a gang of thieves kidnap a Marine veteran's wife during a heist gone wrong, the Marine hunts them down to save her.	2006	The first entry in ]The Marine film series, spawning five direct-to-video sequels.
A Marine Story	Ned Farr	Dreya Weber	Major Alexandra Everett, a decorated Marine officer (Weber) returns home from Iraq and is recruited to help a troubled teen prepare for boot camp. When the reason for Alexandra's return become known, it threatens the future for both of them.	2010	Won the Audience Award, Grand Jury Award, and Outstanding Actress for its depiction of the military's "Don't ask, don't tell" policy at Outfest.
Man Down	Dito Montiel	Shia LaBeouf	A Marine returns from Afghanistan to find his hometown devastated, and his wife and son missing.	2015	
Mine	Fabio Guaglione and Fabio Resinaro	Armie Hammer	A psychological thriller dealing with a Marine's (Hammer) mindstate, who hears the click of a mine and attempts to remain still until help arrives.	2016	
Megan Leavey	Gabriela Cowperthwaite	Kate Mara	Marine corporal Megan Leavey (Mara) served as a Military Police K9 handler paired with military working dog Rex. The pair were deployed to Ramadi in 2006, where they were both wounded by an improvised explosive device.	2017	
Semper Fi	Henry-Alex Rubin	Jai Courtney, Nat Wolff	Five friends all enlist in the Marines together. While on leave, Cal's (Courtney) half-brother Oyster (Wolff) gets arrested for assaulting a bar patron and is sent to prison. Upon return from Iraq, Cal and the rest of the squad decide to use their military experience to break Oyster out.	2019	
Redemption Day	Hicham Hajji	Gary Dourdan, Serinda Swan	An archeologist (Swan) inadvertently crosses into Algeria while searching for a lost city, and is captured by insurgents. Her husband, Marine Captain Brad Paxton (Dourdan), calls in favors in order to rescue her.	2021	
Purple Hearts	Elizabeth Allen Rosenbaum	Sofia Carson, Nicholas Galitzine	Based on the novel of the same name by Tess Wakefield, an aspiring singer-songwriter with diabetes and no insurance (Carson) agrees to fraudulently marry a Marine (Galitzine) about to be deployed in order to receive military benefits while providing him with more income in order to pay his debts.	2022	Partially filmed at Camp Pendleton.
First to Fight	Christian Nyby	Chad Everett, Gene Hackman, Dean Jagger	Based loosely on the story of Gunnery Sergeant John Basilone, a marine for his heroism in the Guadalcanal campaign in World War II is awarded the Medal of Honor, returns to the United States, and later returns to the Pacific War.	1967	

== See also ==
- Anti-war film
- Cinema of the United States
- List of war films and TV specials
- Propaganda
- War film
