= Fall Guy =

Fall Guy or The Fall Guy may refer to:

- Fall guy, a person to whom blame is attributed to deflect responsibility from another party

== Film ==
- The Fall Guy (1913 film), an American film produced by The Foster Photoplay Company
- The Fall Guy (1921 film), an American silent comedy
- The Fall Guy (1930 film), an American crime drama
- Fall Guy (1947 film), an American film noir
- Fallguy, a 1962 American film
- The Fall Guy (1965 film), an industrial film short for U.S. Steel starring Buster Keaton
- Fall Guy (1982 film), a Japanese film
- The Fall Guy (2024 film), an American action film based on the 1980s television series

== Literature ==
- The Fall Guy, a 1912 novel by Brand Whitlock
- The Fall Guy, a 1925 play by George Abbott and James Gleason
- Fall Guy, a 1960 novel by Hartley Howard
- The Fall Guy, a 1972 novel by Ritchie Perry; the first installment in the Super Secret Agent series
- Fall Guy, a 1977 novel by Jay Cronley
- Fall Guy, a 2001 novel by Scott Mackay; the second installment in the Barry Gilbert series
- Fall Guy, a 2004 novel by Claire McNab; the 16th installment in the Carol Ashton series
- The Fall Guy, a 2011 novel by Barbara Fradkin; the first installment in the Cedric O'Toole series
- The Fall Guy, a 2016 novel by James Lasdun
- Fall Guy, a 2022 novel by Archer Mayor; the 33th installment in the Joe Gunther series

== Television ==
- The Fall Guy, a 1980s American television series

=== Episodes ===
- "Fall Guy", Cain at Abel episode 5 (2018)
- "Fall Guy", Cannon season 5, episode 9 (1975)
- "Fall Guy", Good Girls season 4, episode 3 (2021)
- "Fall Guy", Mr. Belvedere season 4, episode 7 (1987)
- "Fall Guy", The Abbott and Costello Show season 2, episode 25 (1954)
- "Fall Guy", The Bill series 10, episode 152 (1994)
- "Fall Guy", The First 48 season 11, episode 1 (2011)
- "Fall Guy", The Untouchables (1959) season 3, episode 12 (1962)
- "Fall Guy", Underbelly: The Golden Mile episode 4 (2010)
- "The Fall Guy", 4th and Loud episode 4 (2014)
- "The Fall Guy", Below Deck Mediterranean season 7, episode 17 (2022)
- "The Fall Guy", Contessa episode 87 (2018)
- "The Fall Guy", Necessary Roughness season 2, episode 14 (2013)
- "The Fall Guy", Not for Hire episode 4 (1959)
- "The Fall Guy", Public Eye series 7, episode 5 (1975)
- "The Fall Guy", Still Game series 8, episode 6 (2018)
- "The Fall Guy", The Adventures of Ozzie and Harriet season 1, episode 4 (1952)
- "The Fall Guy", The Brothers (1972) series 4, episode 14 (1975)
- "The Fall Guy", Your Honor (Indian) episode 1 (2020)

== Video games ==
- The Fall Guy (video game), a video game based on the 1980s television series
- Fall Guys, a 2020 platformer battle royale video game developed by Mediatonic

== Other media ==
- "Fall Guy", episode 115 of the animated short series Crime Time (2009)
- "Fall Guy", episode 10 of the second season of the Woody Woodpecker web series (2020)
- The Fall Guy (soundtrack), the soundtrack album for the 2024 film
