= Trucker's Woman =

1975 action / trucker / exploitation film by Will Zens

- Theatrical poster
- Directed by: Will Zens
- Written by: Joseph A. Alvarez; W. Henry Smith
- Produced by: W. Henry Smith
- Starring: Michael Hawkins; Mary Cannon; Peggy Linville; Phil Smoot; Doodles Weaver
- Cinematography: Darrell Cathcart
- Music by: Bobby Atkins; Charles Jeffords; Jackie Jeffords; Wayne Jeffords; Dan Knight; Allan M. Miller; Jerry Shinn; W. Henry Smith
- Distributed by: Preacherman Corporation; Super Pix
- Release date: May 1975
- Running time: 81 minutes
- Country: United States
- Language: English

Trucker's Woman (also released as Truckin' Man) is a 1975 action film directed by Will Zens and starring Michael Hawkins.

== Plot ==
Mike Kelly's father is driving his truck, when suddenly the brakes fail and he ends up losing control, resulting in a crash in which he dies. Kelly drops out of college and goes undercover as a trucker to find out what happened to his father.

While out on his job, he meets Karen, who he soon falls in love with. However, there is something wrong with the trucking business, criminals are attacking drivers and controlling the truck routes.

At one point, Kelly is set up and gets arrested. When he gets out, he gets his revenge by fighting the men who set him up, and then the thugs try to kill Kelly the same way his father died. Turns out, they cut the brakes on his father’s truck. Kelly manages to avoid an accident and ends up defeating the criminals, along with other truck drivers. Karen and Kelly now are big time in the trucking business, with Karen as boss.

While driving, Kelly meets Karen again, but when Kelly stops and Karen gets out of the truck, Kelly starts driving off without her. Karen sees this and is left behind, exclaiming “Kelly, you’re fired!”

== Production ==
The film was shot over three weeks in November 1974 in Florence and Society Hill, South Carolina.

== Release ==
The film was originally called Truckin' Man, and was screened under that title for the first six months of its theatrical release (appearing on a double bill with Hot Summer in Barefoot County). The distributor felt that changing it to Trucker's Woman would result in higher box office returns.

=== Home media ===
Cover of Troma's 1983 VHS release of the film

One of the home media distributors was Troma Entertainment, in 1983 on videocassette. The cover of this release (below), featured new photography of models not resembling the actual actors in the film.

== Legacy ==
Subliminal pizza frame

In 2018, the film was subject to a comedic running commentary by RiffTrax's Mike Nelson, Kevin Murphy and Bill Corbett.

Trucker's Woman also contains a mysterious, random image of a pepperoni pizza lying on a wooden deck that appears for a single frame in the middle of a brake line checking scene, at 1:08:38 (or 1:00:51 in the RiffTrax version, which, based on the shorter runtime and lack of R-rated material, seems to be based on a television edit). Due to the vignetting effect which was applied to it, it appears that the insertion of this frame was not accidental, but rather was an attempt to subliminally influence audiences to buy pizza (e.g. from drive-in theater concession stands).

== See also ==
- List of American films of 1975
- The Starfighters - the 1964 Air Force film also directed by Zens that was spoofed by MST3K
