= Flying Leathernecks =

1951 film by Nicholas Ray

- Theatrical release poster
- Directed by: Nicholas Ray
- Screenplay by: James Edward Grant
- Story by: Kenneth Gamet
- Produced by: Edmund Grainger
- Starring: John Wayne; Robert Ryan; Don Taylor; Janis Carter; Jay C. Flippen; William Harrigan
- Cinematography: William E. Snyder
- Edited by: Sherman Todd
- Music by: Roy Webb
- Production company: RKO Radio Pictures
- Distributed by: RKO Radio Pictures
- Release dates: August 28, 1951 (US); October 22, 1951 (UK)
- Running time: 102 minutes
- Country: United States
- Language: English
- Box office: $2.6 million (U.S. rentals)

Flying Leathernecks is a 1951 American Technicolor action war film directed by Nicholas Ray, produced by Edmund Grainger and starring John Wayne and Robert Ryan. The film details the exploits and personal battles of Marine Corps aviators, known as "leathernecks", during World War II.

== Plot ==
Major Dan Kirby arrives at VMF-247 (the "Wildcats") as the new commander, although the unit was expecting Captain Carl "Grif" Griffin to take command. Kirby is strict from the beginning. Assigned to the Cactus Air Force during the Guadalcanal campaign, he has few planes available and an airfield attacked daily by the Japanese. His pilots are young and immature, sometimes disobeying orders and foolishly risking equipment and lives. Kirby demands maximum effort, while Griffin stays closer to his young pilots, including his brother-in-law, Vern "Cowboy" Blythe.

Kirby hates knowing that he is sending pilots to their deaths, but feels that the success of the missions is of greatest importance. The hard conditions of war force Kirby to become even stricter with his exhausted pilots, and tensions with Griffin increase.

Although Kirby tends to order low-level ground attacks to support the Marine units, headquarters does not approve of his tactics until his troops are in imminent danger from the Japanese. Kirby adjusts his tactics and the losses increase, but successes also occur, and he leads the squadron in an attack on a huge Japanese convoy.

The Wildcats' line chief, MSgt. Clancy, is an old Marine veteran and has fought alongside Kirby. He employs unorthodox methods to obtain provisions for the unit. His improvisation helps the poorly equipped Wildcats, although Clancy is eventually demoted to the rank of private.

Kirby is promoted to lieutenant colonel and Griffin to major. Mustered back to Hawaii and destined for Washington, D.C., Kirby is given the chance to return to the Pacific front and organize low-level ground attacks. He returns to the same unit and aircrew, now equipped with F4U Corsair fighters. Kirby leads his men against Japanese troops and defends against kamikaze attacks during the Battle of Okinawa. At a crucial moment in the battle, to avoid splitting his formation, Griffin denies assistance to Blythe, who is killed as a result. During the battle, Kirby’s guns jam and he crashes his plane into a bomber. He is able to bail but is injured and rescued by a Navy launch. Leaving the squadron, Kirby recommends Griffin as commanding officer of VMF-247, as he understands that Griffin now can place the lives of his pilots second. They split with a friendly promise to meet again. Kirby admits that every moment in which he and Griffin are required to make a decision is a nightmare, but that is the responsibility that comes with leadership.

== Cast ==
- John Wayne as Major (later Lieutenant Colonel) Daniel Kirby
- Robert Ryan as Captain/Major Carl "Griff" Griffin
- Don Taylor as Second Lieutenant Vern "Cowboy" Blythe
- Janis Carter as Joan Kirby
- Jay C. Flippen as Master Sergeant (later Private First Class) Clancy, Line Chief
- William Harrigan as Dr./Lieutenant Commander Joe Curran
- James Bell as Colonel E. R. Hughes
- Barry Kelley as Brigadier General
- Maurice Jara as Shorty Vegay
- Adam Williams as Lieutenant Bert Malotke
- James Dobson as Lieutenant Pudge McCabe
- Carleton Young as Colonel Riley
- Michael St. Angel as Captain Harold Jorgensen (billed as Steve Flagg)
- Brett King as First Lieutenant Ernie Stark
- Gordon Gebert as Tommy Kirby

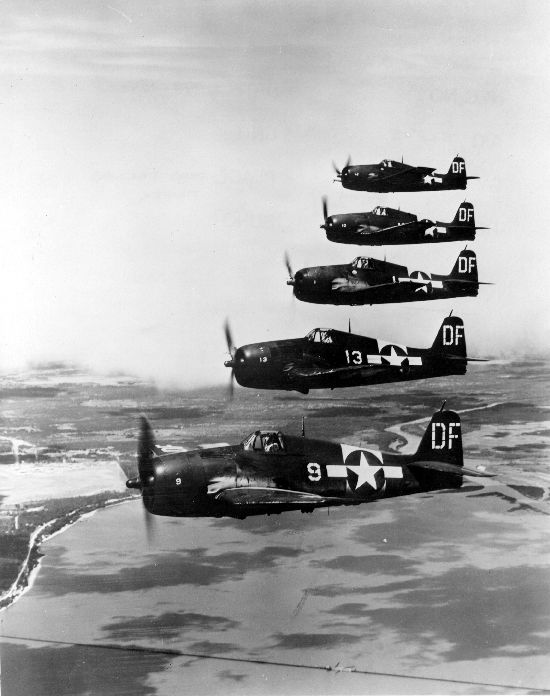
Grumman F6F Hellcats drawn from reserves were used extensively in the film

== Background ==
The film's screenplay was credited to James Edward Grant, based on a story by Kenneth Gamet, but some sources claim that Beirne Lay, Jr. was an uncredited contributor as well.

Director Nicholas Ray chose Robert Ryan to play opposite John Wayne because Ryan had been a boxer in college and was the only actor whom Ray could imagine could "kick Wayne's ass". Tim Holt was originally announced as part of the cast.

== Production ==
As indicated in the opening scene of the film, Howard Hughes, himself a pilot with an interest in aviation, bankrolled the production. Hughes made the decision to film in Technicolor, making use of color wartime combat footage.

Principal photography began in November 1950 at Camp Pendelton and El Toro Marine Corps bases and then moved to RKO-Pathé Studios in February 1951 for soundstage sequences. The fighter aircraft appearing in the first part of the film are not the historically accurate Grumman F4F Wildcats but Grumman F6F Hellcats, provided from the training units at El Toro. The Wildcats did not continue in service after the war, while an appreciable number of Hellcats were available in 1951, the year when the film was produced. In closeup shots, the overpainted markings that adorned postwar Hellcats can be identified. T-6 Texan trainers painted white were used as Zero fighters. The Vought F4U Corsair was also featured prominently in the last half of the film.

During filming, a near disaster occurred when stunt pilot Paul Mantz and his photo crew, while filming a low-altitude attack, were caught in a premature dynamite detonation. The B-25 camera platform was badly damaged, but Mantz successfully executed an emergency landing.

The role of Major Kirby was inspired by real World War II flying ace Major John L. Smith for his missions over Guadalcanal in 1942. His actions in the war were renowned by the time when the film was made. Smith was awarded the Medal of Honor in 1943 and later promoted to lieutenant colonel, as was Kirby in the film. A distinct similarity in appearance between Smith and John Wayne was noted.

== Reception ==
In a contemporary review for The New York Times, critic Howard Thompson wrote:

Mr. Hughes, pictorially speaking, has taken no chances. He has photographed his man's-man package in brilliant Technicolor and turned over the directorial reins to Nicholas Ray, who has crammed a lot of sound and fury into his flying assaults. These sequences, in fact, are so fast, furious and picturesque and so adroitly spliced in with spectacular newsreel footage that any combat-hardened Marine pilot should justifiably tingle with pride. We wonder about the reaction to stereotyped shenanigans on the ground. The old "Dawn Patrol'' story of the subordinate who comes to loathe his commanding officer as a heartless butcher of "kids" and then finds himself put in the same unrewarding spot has never seemed so sophomoric, even with Mr. Hughes' eye-filling backgrounds. ... Scenarist James Edward Grant has lacquered these cliches of character and incident with dialogue that borders on the absurd. One carefully injected homecoming sequence involving Mr. Wayne and his wife, played by beautiful, lippy Janis Carter, is downright embarrassing. But with Mr. Wayne, Mr. Ryan and their charges in the cockpits against the crackling magnificence of Mr. Ray's battle-torn sky, the picture is as it should be.

== See also ==
- John Wayne filmography
- Close air support
- List of films featuring the United States Marine Corps
