= Will Zens =

American film director

- Born: June 26, 1920; Milwaukee, WI
- Died: 2013|03|27; Laguna Hills, CA
- Occupations: Film producer, director, screenwriter

Frederick Willard Zens (June 26, 1920 – March 27, 2013) was an American film producer, director, screenwriter and soundtrack composer who worked on mainly low budget films from the 1960s through the 1980s.

== Early life and education ==
Zens was born in Milwaukee, Wisconsin. Following service as a test pilot in the U.S. Army Air Force in the European Theatre of Operations, Zens earned his master's degree in film from the University of Southern California (USC).

== Career ==
He made his first film Capture That Capsule in 1961. Zens did not make another film until The Starfighters filmed at George Air Force Base that chronicled the F-104 aircraft with Bob Dornan in the lead role. Zens and Dornan next collaborated on a Vietnam War film To the Shores of Hell made the following year. In 1967 Zens made The Road to Nashville and Hell on Wheels but made no more films until Hot Summer in Barefoot County (1974) and Trucker's Woman (1975), with his final film, The Fix in 1985.
