= Hell on Wheels (1967 film) =

1967 film by Will Zens

- Directed by: Will Zens
- Written by: Wesley Cox
- Produced by: Robert Patrick
- Starring: John Ashley; Marty Robbins
- Distributed by: Crown International Pictures
- Release date: 1967
- Country: USA
- Language: English
- Budget: $200,000 est

Hell on Wheels is a 1967 American action film about stock-car racing that includes musical performances by several popular country and western singers. It stars Marty Robbins, a popular and successful singer who also dabbled as a NASCAR race driver for a number of years.

== Plot ==
Marty, a stock-car driver, has two brothers: Del, a mechanic who is jealous of Marty, and Steve, who tries to bust a moonshine ring.

Del opens his own garage, building "tankers" for moonshiners on the side, ignoring the requests of his girlfriend Sue. Del makes a proposition to the owner of a car that Marty has often defeated and is allowed to race against his brother. Del wins the race and tries to break away from the moonshine ring, but he and Marty are kidnapped. They manage to escape and the moonshine gang die in a car chase. Marty and Del then help Steve round up the remaining criminals.

The brothers are also regulars at a local club where musical performances by Marty Robbins, Connie Smith and the Stonemans are featured.

== Cast ==
- Marty Robbins as Himself
- John Ashley as Del
- Gigi Perreau as Sue
- Robert Dornan as Steve
- Connie Smith as Herself
- The Stonemans as Themselves
- Robert Foulk as Sutton
- Frank Gerstle as Ben
- Christine Tabbott
- Chris Eland
- Eddie Crandall
- Marvin Miller as The Racing Announcer

== Songs ==
- "No Tears Milady"
- "The Shoe Goes on the Other Foot"
- "Fly Butterfly Fly"
- "This Song"
- "Darling Would You Take Me Back Again"
- "I'll Have to Make Some Changes"

== Production ==
The film was shot in Nashville and was independently produced. John Ashley later recalled: "Marty was a terrific fellow and a great singer, and I was a big fan of his. He was a stock car racer, loved stock cars, and the producers had put this thing together. They said to me that this was going to be his motion picture debut, and they needed me to play his brother and basically carry the movie. So I went down there for six or seven weeks."

Ashley, a native of Oklahoma, says that he was "... a big country and western fan. I got a chance to meet a lot of the guys I had heard and admired." Ashley met Charley Pride on the night that Pride became the first black artist to appear at the Grand Ole Opry. Ashley later helped Robbins sponsor a stock car racer. "I didn't have to commit a lot of money, but he wanted a publicity tie-in with me, putting Straightaway on the car. Marty never drove my car, but my car did compete in a couple of races Marty was in." Although Ashley had a career as a pop singer, he did not sing in the film.

== See also ==
- List of American films of 1967

== Notes ==
- Lamont, John (1992). "The John Ashley Interview Part 2". Trash Compactor (Volume 2 No. 6 ed.) pp 2-7.
