= Marines, Let's Go =

1961 film by Raoul Walsh

- Original film poster
- Directed by: Raoul Walsh
- Written by: Raoul Walsh (story); John Twist
- Produced by: Raoul Walsh
- Starring: Tom Tryon; David Hedison; Tom Reese; Linda Hutchings; Barbara Stuart
- Cinematography: Lucien Ballard
- Edited by: Robert L. Simpson
- Music by: Irving Gertz title song sung by Rex Allen
- Distributed by: 20th Century Fox
- Release date: August 15, 1961
- Running time: 103 min.
- Country: United States
- Language: English
- Budget: $1,665,000

Marines, Let's Go is a 1961 American CinemaScope DeLuxe Color Korean War film about three Marine buddies (Tom Tryon, David Hedison and Tom Reese) on shore leave in Japan and at war in Korea. It was produced and directed by Raoul Walsh, who also wrote the story. Walsh had previously had successes with films about the U.S. Marine Corps in World War I (What Price Glory?), the 1920s (The Cock-Eyed World and Sadie Thompson), and World War II (Battle Cry). This was the next-to-last film of Walsh's long directing career.

== Plot summary ==
During the Korean War, an infantry unit from the 1st Marine Division is given R&R in Yokosuka, Japan. The group is led by PFC Desmond "Let's Go" McCaffrey, a veteran of the Guadalcanal campaign and the Battle of Okinawa with over 16 years of service in the Corps, yet he is repeatedly demoted from the rank of Sergeant. McCaffrey, described as "a headache to the enemy, a migraine to the M.P.s" is incapable of behaving himself on leave due to his penchants for excessive alcohol consumption and hand-to-hand combat with people on his own side.

When PFC Skip Roth, a World War II "retread" called the "brain" for being a scheming con-man loses the gang's money during gambling, he concocts an elaborate scheme to pay for their R&R. He converses with Private Pete Kono, a Japanese-American World War II veteran on a walkie-talkie to fool the staff of a respectable family hotel into believing the Marines are an undercover counter-espionage group working for General Douglas MacArthur, including having the hotel management give the Marines money for their expenses. Unfortunately the radio conversations are picked up by the Marine Corps Provost Marshal.

Other Marines in the group include: PFC David Chatfield, who McCaffrey hates because he is from a well-to-do Back Bay, Boston family. Chatfield has a Korean "Moose" he left behind. Pvt. Newt Levells is a young Texan who intends to meet a woman he has been corresponding with from his home town in Texas who was interned by the Japanese with her family during the war, but never returned to the US. Pvt. Waller intends to meet his girlfriend as does the company Gunnery Sergeant Hawkins.

The group is told to keep their eye on McCaffrey as he is due to be promoted to his old rank and awarded the Silver Star, but Roth schemes to get McCaffrey into trouble by forging unknown love letters, then blaming them on a sailor to goad him into a brawl. McCaffrey gets his revenge by having Fuji, a girlfriend's Sumo champion brother go after Roth.

The Marines are called back to Korea to repel a Chinese offensive in the area where Chatfield's "Moose" and her father live.

== Cast ==
- Tom Reese as Pfc. McCaffrey
- Tom Tryon as Pfc. Roth
- David Hedison as Pfc. Chatfield
- Linda Hutchings as Grace
- Barbara Stuart as Ina
- David Brandon as Pvt. Newt Levels
- Steve Baylor as Pvt. Chase
- Peter Miller as Gunnery Sgt. Howard Hawkins
- Rachel Romen as Mrs. Ellen Hawkins (as Adoree Evans)
- Hideo Inamura as Pvt. Pete Kono
- Vince Williams as Hank Dyer (war correspondent)
- Fumiyo Fujimoto as Song Do (Chatfield's girl)
- Heihachirô Ôkawa as Yoshida (hotel manager)
- Shohei "Giant" Baba as Fuji
- Roy Jenson as a Sailor

== Production ==
Filming started February 1961.

Walsh filmed the movie on location in Japan with extras from the US Marine Corps, who were pulled off filming due to the possibility of their being sent to Laos. The film was completed in Okinawa.

The Marine technical advisor of the film was Colonel Jacob G. Goldberg (1911–2008), who served 30 years in the Marine Corps.

Tom Reese was a former Marine and a military policeman, Roy Jenson a former sailor.

== Reception ==
Variety called it "dated, corny, juvenile and predictable."

When the White House was interested in Warner Bros. making a film on John F. Kennedy's exploits as the commander of PT 109, Jack L. Warner sent a print of Marines, Let's Go to display Raoul Walsh's expertise for making the movie about Kennedy. The president hated the film, however, and Warner Bros. had to choose a new director for PT 109.

== See also ==
- List of films featuring the United States Marine Corps
