= Ernest Stoneman =

American singer-songwriter (1893–1968)

Pop Stoneman

Background information
- Also known as: Pop
- Born: Ernest Van Stoneman; May 25, 1893; Monarat, Carroll County, Virginia, US
- Died: June 14, 1968 (aged 75)
- Genre: Country
- Occupation: Country artist
- Instruments: Guitar, autoharp, harmonica
- Years active: 1920s–1960s

Ernest Van "Pop" Stoneman (May 25, 1893 – June 14, 1968) was an American musician, ranked among the prominent recording artists of country music's first commercial decade.

== Biography ==
Born in a log cabin in Monarat (Iron Ridge), Carroll County, Virginia, United States, near what would later become Galax, Virginia, Stoneman was left motherless at age three and was raised by his father and three musically inclined cousins, who taught him the instrumental and vocal traditions of Blue Ridge Mountains culture. He became a singer and songwriter, and proficient musician on the guitar, autoharp, harmonica, clawhammer banjo, and jaw harp.

When he married Hattie Frost in November 1918, he entered another musically involved family. Hattie and he had 23 children, 13 of whom survived to adulthood, including Calvin Scott (Scotty) (died 1973), and Veronica Loretta (Roni) (died 2024).

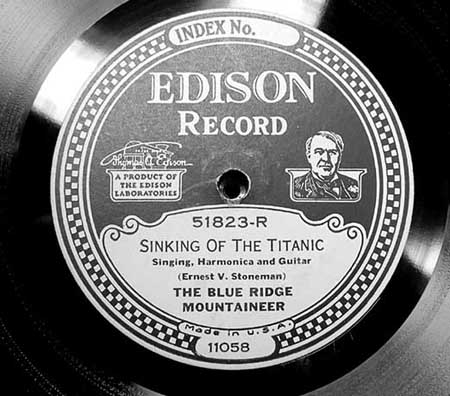
Record label of "Sinking of the Titanic" by Ernest Stoneman, Edison Diamond Disc 51823-R, released October 1926

Stoneman worked at a variety of jobs, in mines, mills, but mostly carpentry, and played music for his own enjoyment and that of his neighbors, but when he heard a Henry Whitter record in 1924, he determined to better it and changed his life. Stoneman went to New York City in September 1924 and cut two songs for the Okeh Records label. The record was shelved and he had to return for another recording session in January 1925. The resultant debut single release, "Sinking of the Titanic", went on to become one of the biggest hits of the 1920s. One historian noted that the recording sold over two million copies. Ralph Peer directed him through several sessions for Okeh and Victor, and he freelanced on other labels such as Edison, Gennett, and Paramount Records. In 1926, he added family musicians to his group for a full string-band sound.

In July and August 1927, Stoneman helped Peer conduct the Bristol sessions that led to the discovery of the Carter Family and Jimmie Rodgers. He continued to be active in recording through 1929. Between 1925 and 1929, Stoneman recorded more than 200 songs.

Falling on hard times during the Depression, the Stonemans and their nine surviving children moved to the Washington, DC, area in 1932, after losing their home and most of their possessions. There, they had four more children and struggled through dire poverty, with Stoneman taking whatever work he could find and trying to revive his musical career.

In 1941, Stoneman bought a lot in Carmody Hills, Maryland, where he built a shack for the family, and eventually obtained a more-or-less regular job at the Naval Gun Factory. In 1947, the Stoneman Family won a talent contest at Constitution Hall that gave them six months' exposure on local television. In 1956, Pop won $10,000 on the NBC-TV quiz show The Big Surprise and sang on the show. That same year, the Blue Grass Champs, a group composed largely of his children, were winners on the CBS-TV program Arthur Godfrey's Talent Scouts, and Mike Seeger recorded Pop and Hattie for Folkways.

Stoneman retired from labor and the Champs went full-time to become the Stonemans. They recorded albums for Starday in 1962 and 1963, and in 1964, went to Texas and California, cutting an album for World Pacific, playing at Disneyland, on some network shows and at several folk festivals. This included an appearance at the Monterey Folk Festival in 1964. Ernest appeared at the Second Annual UCLA Folk Music Festival in 1964.

In 1965, the Stonemans went to Nashville, where they worked with Jack Clement, signing a contract with MGM Records and starting a syndicated TV show. They received CMA's "Vocal Group of the Year" in 1967. They appeared in the 1967 film Hell on Wheels and in The Road to Nashville (1967).

== Death ==
Pop Stoneman died in 1968 at age 75. He is interred in the Mount Olivet Cemetery in Nashville.

== Honors ==
On February 12, 2008, Pop Stoneman was inducted into the Country Music Hall of Fame, and in 2009, his wife Hattie Frost Stoneman and he were enshrined in the Gennett Records Walk of Fame.

The first major retrospective of his musical career, Ernest Stoneman: The Unsung Father of Country Music 1925–1934 (5 String Productions) was issued in 2008 by the Grammy award-winning reissue team of Christopher C. King and Henry Sapoznik, and was nominated for a 2009 Grammy Award for Best Album Notes.

== The Stonemans discography ==
=== Albums ===
Year	Album	US Country	Label
1962	Bluegrass Champs	—	Starday
1964	Big Ball in Monterey	—	World Pacific
1966	Those Singin' Swingin' Stompin' Sensational Stonemans	39	MGM
1967	Stoneman's Country	13	MGM
1968	All in the Family	42	MGM
1968	The Great Stonemans	45	MGM
1968	Pop Stoneman Memorial Album	—	MGM
1968	Stoneman Christmas	—	MGM
1969	Dawn of the Stonemans' Age	—	RCA
1970	In All Honesty	—	RCA
1970	California Blues	—	RCA
1976	Cuttin' The Grass	—	CMH Records
1977	On The Road : A Live In-Studio Performance	—	CMH Records
1981	The First Family Of Country Music	—	CMH Records

=== Compilations ===
Year	Album	US Country	Label
1986	With Family And Friends Vol. I	—	Old Homestead
1985	With Family And Friends Vol. II	—	Old Homestead

=== Singles ===
Year	Single	Chart Positions		Album
Year	Single	US Country	CAN Country	Album
1924	"The Face That Never Returned"	—	—	The Face That Never Returned / The Sinking of the Titanic
1924	"The Sinking of the Titanic"	—	—	The Face That Never Returned / The Sinking of the Titanic
1926	"When the Work's All Done This Fall"	—	—	5188: Edison Blue Amberol 11054: Edison Record
1926	"Wild Bill Jones"	—	—	5196: Edison Blue Amberol 11056: Edison Record
1927	"Two Little Orphans"	—	—	5338: Edison Blue Amberol 11464: Edison Record
1928	"The Old Maid and the Burgler"	—	—	5531: Edison Blue Amberol E18442: Edison Record
1962	"Talking Fiddle Blues"	—	—	Bluegrass Champs
1964	"Ground Hog"	—	—	Big Ball in Monterey
1966	"Tupelo County Jail"	40	—	Those Singin' Swingin' Stompin' Sensational Stonemans
1966	"The Five Little Johnson Girls"	21	—	Stoneman's Country
1967	"Back to Nashville, Tennessee"	40	—	Stoneman's Country
1967	"West Canterbury Subdivision Blues"	49	—	All in the Family
1968	"Cimarron"	—	—	All in the Family
1968	"Christopher Robin"	41	17	The Great Stonemans
1968	"Travelin' Man"	—	—	single only
1969	"Tecumseh Valley"	—	—	Dawn of the Stonemans' Age
1970	"Get Together"	—	—	In All Honesty
1970	"Who Will Stop the Rain"	—	—	In All Honesty
1970	"California Blues"	—	—	California Blues
