= Dick O'Neill =

American actor (1928–1998)

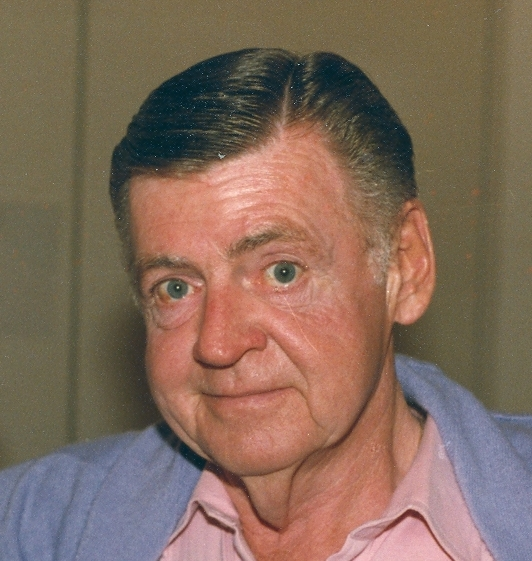
- Backstage at the Kennedy Center in 1983
- Born: Richard Francis O'Neill; August 29, 1928; New York City, US.
- Died: November 17, 1998 (aged 70); Santa Monica, California, U.S.
- Years active: 1955–1998
- Spouse: Susan Jacqueline Shaw (m. 1964)
- Children: 3

Richard Francis O'Neill (August 29, 1928 – November 17, 1998) was an American stage, film and television character actor best known for playing Irish cops, fathers, judges and army generals. He began his acting career as an original company member of Arena Stage in Washington, D.C.

== Biography ==
=== Early life and television roles ===
O'Neill was born in New York City on August 29, 1928, and studied at Syracuse University. He served in the Navy then returned to the theater. In the late 1950s, he began appearing on television. His television credits include Car 54, Where Are You?, The Honeymooners, Barney Miller, Sanford and Son, Good Times, Kaz, M*A*S*H, The Feather and Father Gang, The Facts of Life, Family Matters, Mad About You, Murder, She Wrote, Father Dowling Mysteries, Three's Company, Wonder Woman, One Day at a Time, Magnum, P.I., A Man Called Intrepid, Growing Pains, Dark Justice, Cheers, Dharma & Greg, Cybill, The Fresh Prince of Bel-Air to Home Improvement. He was probably best known for his role as Charlie Cagney in the television series Cagney & Lacey.

=== Stage ===
O'Neill acted five years with Arena Stage in Washington, D. C., and two years with the Kenley Players in Columbus, Ohio. Before moving to California, he made his Broadway debut as Christmas Morgan in The Unsinkable Molly Brown. His other Broadway credits include Skyscraper, Promises, Promises, and Tough to Get Help.

=== Film roles ===
His film credits include The Mugger (1958), To the Shores of Hell (1966), Gammera the Invincible (1966), Pretty Poison (1968), Some of My Best Friends Are... (1971), The Taking of Pelham One Two Three (1974), The Front Page (1974), Posse (1975), St. Ives (1976), Prime Time a.k.a. American Raspberry (1977), MacArthur (1977), The Buddy Holly Story (1978), House Calls (1978), The Jerk (1979), Wolfen (1981), Chiller (1985), Prizzi's Honor (1985), The Mosquito Coast (1986), She's Out of Control (1989) and Loose Cannons (1990).

== Personal life and death ==
He met his wife Jackie Shaw O'Neill when they appeared together in a production of The Sound of Music. He and Jackie had three daughters, Meghan, Gillian and Caitlin. On November 17, 1998, O'Neill died of heart failure at the age of 70 at St. John's Medical Center in Santa Monica.

== Filmography ==
=== Film ===
Year	Film	Role	Notes
1958	The Mugger	Sergeant Cassidy	
1961	Capture That Capsule	Al	
1962	Fallguy		
1966	To the Shores of Hell	Major Fred Howard	
1966	Gamera, the Giant Monster	General O'Neill	
1967	Soldier in Love	Footman	TV film
1968	Pretty Poison	Bud Munsch	
1971	Some of My Best Friends Are...	Tim Holland	
1972	Hail!	Attorney General	
1974	The Taking of Pelham One Two Three	Frank Correll	
1974	The Front Page	McHugh	
1975	Hustling	Keogh	TV film
1975	Posse	Wiley	
1975	The UFO Incident	General James Davison	TV film
1975	The Entertainer	Charlie	TV film
1976	Woman of the Year	Phil Whitaker	TV film
1976	St. Ives	Hesh	
1977	MacArthur	General Courtney Whitney	
1977	It Happened One Christmas	Mr. Gower	TV film
1977	American Raspberry	General Andrews	
1978	Perfect Gentlemen	Mr. Appleton	TV film
1978	House Calls	Irwin Owett	
1978	The Buddy Holly Story	Sol Gittler	
1979	The Jerk	'Frosty'	
1980	The Comeback Kid	Phil	TV film
1980	The Ghosts of Buxley Hall	General Eulace C. Buxley	TV film
1981	Wolfen	Captain Warren	
1982	Family in Blue	Chester Malone	TV film
1984	Flashpoint	Hinshaw	Uncredited
1984	A Touch of Scandal	Lieutenant Halquist	TV film
1985	Lots of Luck	Wilson	TV film
1985	Turk 182	Powerhouse Chief	
1985	Wes Craven's Chiller	Clarence Beeson	TV film
1985	Prizzi's Honor	Bluestone	
1986	Passion Flower	Martin Churit	TV film
1986	There Must Be a Pony	Chief Investigator Roy Clymer	TV film
1986	The Mosquito Coast	Mr. Polski	
1988	The Secret Life of Kathy McCormick	Ray	TV film
1988	The Diamond Trap	Lieutenant Barnett	TV film
1989	She's Out of Control	Chuck Pearson	
1990	Loose Cannons	Captain	
1992	Highway Heartbreaker	Alex's Father	TV film
1993	The American Clock	Ryan	TV film
1994	My Summer Story	Pulaski	
1995	The Unspoken Truth	Thomas Cleary	TV film
1997	Ellen Foster	Judge	TV film

=== Television ===
Year	Title	Role	Notes
1955	Producers' Showcase		Episode: "The Skin of Our Teeth", uncredited
1956	Telephone Time		Episode: "Vicksburg, 5:35 PM"
1959	The DuPont Show of the Month	Policeman	Episode: "Oliver Twist"
1959-1964	Brenner	Detective Steve Mason	TV series
1961	'Way Out		Episode: "Button, Button"
1961	The Defenders	Police Sergeant	Episode: "The Accident"
1961	Car 54, Where Are You?	Bank Security Guard	Episode: "Get Well, Officer Schnauser"
1962	The Doctors and the Nurses	Fred Lawson	Episode: "Night Shift"
1963	The Doctors and the Nurses	Mel Bennet	Episode: "You Could Die Laughing"
1966	The Jackie Gleason Show	Danny, Counterfeiter	Episode: "The Honeymooners: The Curse of the Kramdens"
1966	Hawk	Mr. Conway	Episode: "Blind Man's Bluff"
1972	Sanford and Son	Mr. Sanderson	Episode: "Whiplash"
1974	Get Christie Love!	Alex Dawson	Episode: "Pawn Ticket for Murder"
1974	Good Times	Lynn Bridges	Episode: "Florida's Big Gig"
1975	Kojak	Augustine Pataki	Episode: "Two-Four-Six for Two Hundred"
1975	Joe and Sons	Ryan	Episode: "Joe and Sons"
1975	Barney Miller	Inspector Kelly	2 episodes
1975	Doc	Benson Hedges	Episode: "Benson Hedges"
1975	Insight	Garro	Episode: "Hunger Knows My Name"
1976	Sanford and Son	Commissioner	Episode: "The Oddfather"
1976	Rhoda	Mr. Guthrie	Episode: "Rhoda's Sellout"
1976	Bronk	Warden Connally	Episode: "Jailbreak"
1976	Phyllis	Julius 'Sonny' Dexter	Episode: "Sonny Boy"
1976	Baretta	Bentley	Episode: "Death on the Run"
1976	Insight	Norman Grady	Episode: "Rehearsal"
1976-1982	One Day at a Time	Orville	3 episodes
1977	Maude	Ed Walsh	Episode: "Maude's Reunion"
1977	The Feather and Father Gang	Murphy	Episode: "The Mayan Connection"
1977	Hollywood High	Blaine	2 episodes
1977	Rafferty	Byron Murray	Episode: "The Narrow Thread"
1977	Rosetti and Ryan	Judge Proctor Hardcastle	Recurring role
1977	M*A*S*H	Admiral Cox	Episode: "38 Across"
1978	Operation Petticoat	General Houghton	Episode: "Matt on a Hot Pink Sub"
1978	Wonder Woman	Pat O'Hanlon	Episode: "Pot of Gold"
1978-1979	Kaz	Malloy	Recurring role
1979	Three's Company	Walter Nessle	Episode: "Jack on the Lam"
1979	CHiPs	McNabb	Episode: "Drive, Lady, Drive"
1979	Young Maverick	Hobbs	Episode: "Clancy"
1979	A Man Called Intrepid	Bill Donovan	Miniseries
1979	M*A*S*H	Brigadier General Marion Prescott	Episode: "B. J. Papa San"
1980	The Misadventures of Sheriff Lobo	Walter Cruickshank	Episode: "Hail! Hail! The Gang's All Here"
1980	Diff'rent Strokes	Captain Burns	Episode: "The Bank Job"
1980	Disneyland	General Eulace C. Buxley	Episode: "The Ghosts of Buxley Hall"
1980	The Facts of Life	Henry Douglas	Episode: "Shoplifting"
1981	I'm a Big Girl Now	Burnham	Episode: "Hangers, No Starch"
1981	The Incredible Hulk	Cyrus T. McCormack	Episode: "The Phenom"
1981	Shannon		Episode: "Gotham Swansong"
1981	Jessica Novak	Jim Donnelly	Episode: "Silent Night"
1982	M*A*S*H	Colonel Pitts	Episode: "Sons and Bowlers"
1982	The Fall Guy	Captain Max Finley	Episode: "A Piece of Cake"
1982	Hart to Hart	Lieutenant Warren	2 episodes
1982	Trapper John, M.D.	Ed Renquist	Episode: "John's Other Life"
1982-1987	Cagney & Lacey	Charlie Fitzgerald Cagney	Recurring role
1983	Magnum, P.I.	Harry MacKenzie	Episode: "I Do?"
1983	St. Elsewhere	Mr O'Connor	2 episodes
1984	Empire	Arthur Broderick	Recurring role
1984	The Master	Leo Fairchild	Episode: "The Java Tiger"
1984	Partners in Crime	Bennie Rivers	Episode: "Fantasyland"
1985	The Facts of Life	Ted Metcalf	Episode: "Two Guys from Appleton"
1985	Charles in Charge	Grandpa Harry	Episode: "Meet Grandpa"
1985	Trapper John, M.D.	Wade Ralston	Episode: "All of Me"
1985	Cheers	Mr. Clavin	Episode: "The Bar Stoolie"
1986	Crazy Like a Fox	'Tip' Maloney	Episode: "Hyde-And-Seek"
1986	Better Days	Harry Clooney	Recurring role
1987	Falcon Crest	Fred Wilkinson	Recurring role
1987	Simon & Simon	Jake Boyle	Episode: "New Cop in Town"
1987	The Law & Harry McGraw	Victor Udovic	Episode: "Old Heroes Never Lie"
1988	The Garry Shandling Show	Mr. Sparks	Episode: "Mr. Sparks"
1988	Night Court	Detective Costas	Episode: "Chrizzi's Honor"
1988	Murder, She Wrote	Benny Tibbles	Episode: "Benedict Arnold Slipped Here"
1988	Hotel	Van Lambert	Episode: "Contest of Wills"
1988	Mama's Boy	Father Pat	Episode: "Mickey's Song"
1988	Knots Landing	Tom Daugherty	Episode: "The Perfect Crime"
1988	Growing Pains	Chris	Episode: "Birth of a Seaver"
1989	Top of the Hill	Pat Bell	Recurring role
1990	Island Son		Episode: "Separations"
1990	L.A. Law	Father Walter McNamara	Episode: "Forgive Me Father, for I Have Sued"
1990	Singer & Sons	Floyd Patterson	Episode: "The Boxer Rebellion"
1990-1991	Father Dowling Mysteries	Lieutenant Foster	Recurring role
1991-1993	Dark Justice	Arnold 'Moon' Willis	Recurring role; part of main cast
1992	Reasonable Doubts	Mayor DeVan	Episode: "The Discomfort Zone"
1992	Sibs	Lou Berman	Episode: "I'll Take Manhattan"
1994	Mad About You	Manny Barton	Episode: "Love Letters"
1994	Good Advice	Jackie Harold	Episode: "Roll Out the Barrel"
1994	The Fresh Prince of Bel-Air	Santa Claus	Episode: "Reality Bites"
1994-1996	Home Improvement	Art Leonard	Recurring role
1995	Something Wilder	Hank	Episode: "The Ex Files"
1995	The Commish	Charlie Wolfe	Episode: "Cry Wolfe"
1995	Pig Sty	Mory	Episode: "Erin Go Barf"
1995	Diagnosis: Murder	Wade Phelps	Episode: "Murder in the Courthouse"
1996-1998	Cybill	Roy	Recurring role
1996-1998	Family Matters	Commissioner Geiss	Recurring role
1996	The Sentinel	Warren Brackley	Episode: "Deep Water"
1996	Boy Meets World	Mr. Kimball	Episode: "I Ain't Gonna Spray Lettuce No More"
1996	The Jeff Foxworthy Show	Sheriff	Episode: "Merry Christmas, Y'All"
1997	Timecop	Bert	Episode: "Public Enemy"
1998	Dharma & Greg	Mr. Waring	Episode: "Do You Want Fries with That?"
1998	City Guys	Walter	Episode: "Big Brothers"
