= Doodles Weaver =

American actor (1911–1983)

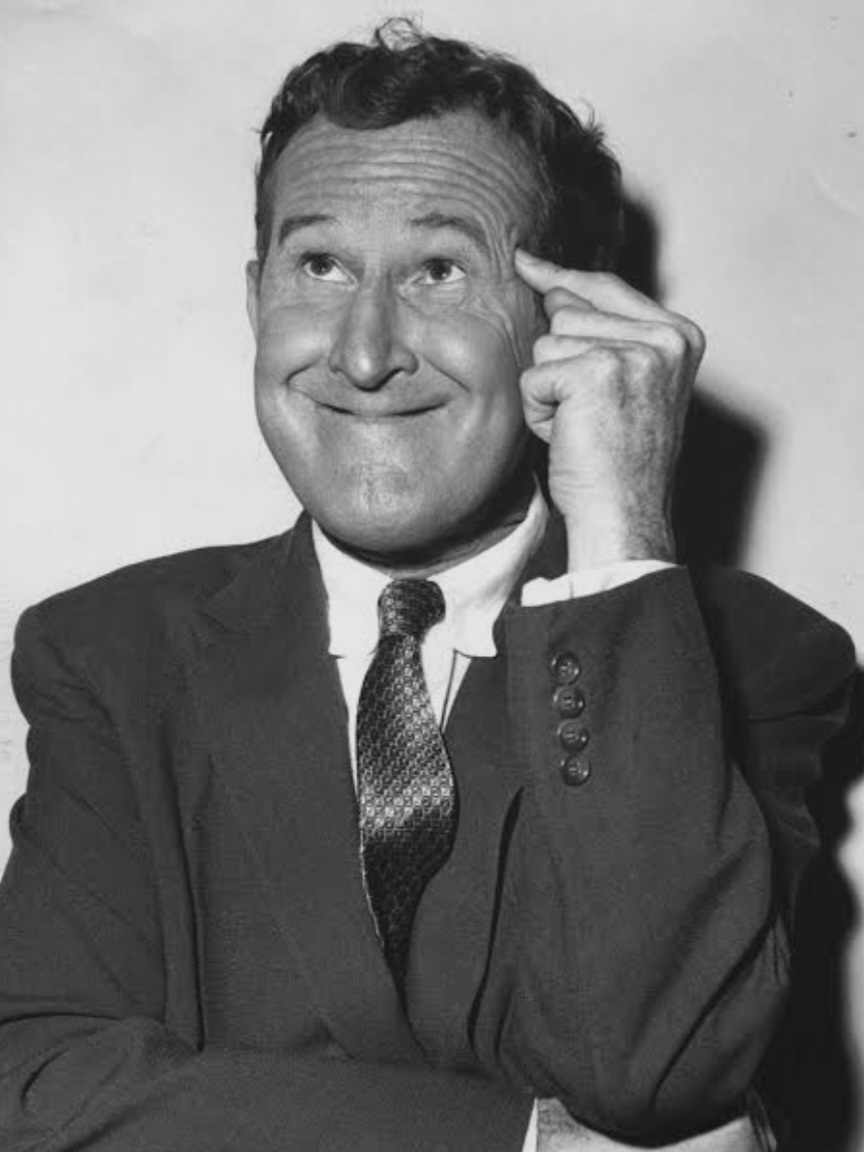
- Weaver in You Bet Your Life, 1960
- Born: Winstead Sheffield Weaver; May 11, 1911; Los Angeles, California, U.S.
- Died: January 17, 1983 (aged 71); Los Angeles, California, U.S.
- Resting place: Avalon Cemetery
- Education: Stanford University
- Occupations: Actor; comedian; musician
- Years active: 1936–1981
- Spouses: Beverly Masterman (m. 1939; div. 1943) Evelyn Irene Paulsen (m. 1946; div. 1948) Lois Frisell (m. 1949; div. 1954) Reita Green (m. 1957; div. 1968)
- Children: 3
- Relatives: Pat Weaver (brother); Elizabeth Inglis (sister-in-law); Sigourney Weaver (niece)

Winstead Sheffield "Doodles" Weaver (May 11, 1911 – January 17, 1983) was an American character actor, comedian, and musician.

Born into a wealthy West Coast family, Weaver began his career in radio. In the late 1930s, he performed on Rudy Vallée's radio programs and Kraft Music Hall. He later joined Spike Jones' City Slickers. In 1957, Weaver hosted his own NBC variety show The Doodles Weaver Show. In addition to his radio work, he also recorded a number of comedy records, appeared in films and guest-starred on numerous television series from the 1950s through the 1970s. Weaver made his last onscreen appearance in 1981. Despondent over poor health, Weaver fatally shot himself in January 1983.

== Early life ==
Weaver was born in Los Angeles, one of four children born to Sylvester Laflin Weaver, a wealthy roofing contractor, and Nellie Mabel (Amabel) Dixon Weaver. His older brother was Pat Weaver, who served as the president of NBC in the 1950s. Weaver's niece is actress Sigourney Weaver. He was of English and Scottish ancestry with roots in New England. Weaver's mother gave him the nickname "Doodlebug" as a child because of his freckles and big ears.

He attended Los Angeles High School and Stanford University. At Stanford, Weaver was a contributor to the Stanford Chaparral humor magazine. He was also known to engage in numerous pranks and practical jokes and earned the nickname "The Mad Monk". He was reportedly suspended from Stanford in 1937 (the year he graduated) for pulling a prank on the train home from the Rose Bowl.

== Career ==
=== Radio and recordings ===
On radio during the late 1930s and early 1940s, he was heard as an occasional guest on Rudy Vallée's program and on the Kraft Music Hall.

In 1946, Weaver signed on as a member of Spike Jones's City Slickers band. Weaver was heard on Jones's 1947–49 radio shows, where he introduced his comedic Professor Feetlebaum (which Weaver sometimes spelled as Feitlebaum), a character who spoke in spoonerisms. Part of the Professor's schtick was mixing up words and sentences in various songs and recitations as if he had myopia or dyslexia. Weaver toured the country with the Spike Jones "Musical Depreciation Revue" until 1951. The radio programs were often broadcast from cities where the Revue was staged.

One of Weaver's most popular recordings is the Spike Jones parody of Rossini's "William Tell Overture". Weaver gives a close impression of the gravel-voiced sports announcer Clem McCarthy in a satire of a horse race announcer who forgets whether he's covering a horse race or a boxing match ("It's Girdle in the stretch! Locomotive is on the rail! Apartment House is second with plenty of room! It's Cabbage by a head!"). The race features a nag named Beetlebaum, who begins at long odds, runs the race a distant last—and yet suddenly emerges as the winner. The oft-repeated "Beetlebaum" became so identified with the record that RCA reprinted the record label, adding "Beetlebaum" in parentheses after the song title. Jones and Weaver followed this hit with a 1949 parody of the Indianapolis 500 automobile race, again with Weaver as commentator, set to Ponchielli's "Dance of the Hours". The surprise winner? Beetlebaum. When an angry listener named Beetlebaum threatened a lawsuit, Weaver changed the name to Feitlebaum.

In 1966, Weaver recorded a novelty version of "Eleanor Rigby"—singing, mixing up the words, insulting, and interrupting, while playing the piano.

=== Writing ===
Weaver was a contributor to the early Mad, as described by Time's Richard Corliss:

Among the funny stuff: Doodles Weaver's strict copy editing of the Gettysburg Address, advising Lincoln to change "fourscore and seven" to eighty-seven ("Be specific"), noting that there are six "dedicates" ("Study your Roget"), wondering if "proposition" isn't misspelled and, finally exasperated, urging the writer to omit "of the people, by the people, for the people" as "superfluous."

=== Films and television ===
Weaver made his television debut on The Colgate Comedy Hour in 1951. He performed an Ajax cleanser commercial with a pig, and the audience reaction prompted the network to give him his own series. In 1951, The Doodles Weaver Show was NBC's summer replacement for Sid Caesar's Your Show of Shows; it was telecast from June to September with Weaver, his wife Lois, vocalist Marian Colby, and the comedy team of Dick Dana and Peanuts Mann. The show's premise involved Weaver dealing with an assignment to stage a no-budget television series using only the discarded costumes, sets and props left behind by more popular network television shows away for the summer.

Weaver went on to guest star on numerous television shows including The Spike Jones Show, The Donna Reed Show, Dennis the Menace, and The Tab Hunter Show. He also hosted several children's television series. In 1965, he starred in A Day With Doodles, a series of six-minute shorts sold as alternative fare to cartoons for locally hosted kiddie television programs. Each episode featured Weaver in a first-person plural adventure (e.g., "Today we are a movie actor"), portraying himself and, behind false mustaches and costume hats, all the other characters in slapstick comedy situations with a voice over narration and minimal sets. The ending credits would invariably list "Doodles... Doodles Weaver" and "Everybody Else... Doodles Weaver."

He portrayed eccentric characters in guest appearances on such television series as Batman (where he played The Archer's henchman Crier Tuck), Land of the Giants, Dragnet 1967 and The Monkees. He appeared in more than 90 films, including The Great Imposter (1961), Pocketful of Miracles (1961), Alfred Hitchcock's The Birds (1963) (as the man helping Tippi Hedren's character with her rental boat), Jerry Lewis's The Nutty Professor (1963), and, in a cameo, It's a Mad, Mad, Mad, Mad World (1963). He appeared in Six Pack Annie (1975). His last movie was Earthbound (1981).

== Personal life ==
Weaver was married four times and had three children. His first marriage was to Beverly Masterman in 1939. His second marriage, to Evelyn Irene Paulsen, ended with a divorce decree on December 22, 1948, but that decree was not recorded at that time. In 1949, Weaver's third marriage was with nightclub dancer Lois Frisell, who had the marriage annulled in 1954.

Weaver's fourth and final marriage was to actress Reita Anne Green in October 1957. They had two children before divorcing in 1969.

== Death ==
On January 17, 1983, Weaver was discovered dead by his son Winston at his Burbank, California, home. He died of two self-inflicted gunshot wounds to the chest. His death was ruled a suicide. Weaver's son said that his father had been despondent over his failing heart health. His funeral service was held on January 22 at Forest Lawn Mortuary in the Hollywood Hills. He was buried in Avalon Cemetery on Santa Catalina Island, California.

Weaver's memoir, Golden Spike, remains unpublished.

== Filmography ==
Film
Year	Title	Role	Notes
1936	My American Wife	Cowhand	Uncredited
1936	Come and Get It	Sourdough Barfly	Uncredited
1937	The Woman I Love	'Chopin' pianist	Uncredited
1937	Behind the Headlines	Duggan	
1937	Topper	Rustic	
1937	Double Wedding	Bass Fiddle Player	Uncredited
1937	Our Gang Follies of 1938	Winstead (piano player)	Short film
1938	A Yank at Oxford	Bill	Uncredited
1938	Swiss Miss	Taxicab Driver	Uncredited
1938	Hold That Co-ed	Gilks	Uncredited
1938	Swing That Cheer	Bennett	
1939	Boy Trouble	Ralph, the Stockboy	Uncredited
1939	Invitation to Happiness	Band Leader / Emcee at Harry's	Uncredited
1939	Flight at Midnight		Uncredited
1939	Thunder Afloat	Sailor Getting Cigar	Uncredited
1939	Another Thin Man	Gatekeeper, MacFay Estate	Uncredited
1939	The Night of Nights	Flower Delivery Man	Uncredited
1940	Li'l Abner	Hannibal Hoops	
1940	Kitty Foyle	Pianist	Uncredited
1941	A Girl, a Guy, and a Gob	Eddie 'Ed'	
1941	Mitt Me Tonight		
1942	The Spirit of Stanford	Student	Uncredited
1942	Girl Trouble	Ticket Taker	Uncredited
1943	Reveille with Beverly	Elmer	Uncredited
1943	Salute for Three	First Sailor at Canteen Sailors' Table	Uncredited
1943	This Is the Army	Soldier	Uncredited
1943	Thank Your Lucky Stars	Doodles Weaver	Uncredited
1944	Shine On, Harvest Mon	Elevator Man	Uncredited
1944	Hey, Rookie	Maxon	
1944	Two Girls and a Sailor	Soldier Playing Ocarina	Uncredited
1944	The Story of Dr. Wassell	Harold Hunter	Uncredited
1944	Since You Went Away	Convalescent Wishing for Watermelon	Uncredited
1944	Kansas City Kitty	Joe	Uncredited
1944	The Singing Sheriff	Ivory	Uncredited
1944	That's My Baby!	Butler	Uncredited
1944	The Merry Monahans	Farmer	Uncredited
1944	San Fernando Valley	Hot Dog Salesman	Uncredited
1944	The National Barn Dance	Musical Team Member	Uncredited
1944	Mrs. Parkington	Caterer	Uncredited
1944	And Now Tomorrow	Charlie	Uncredited
1944	Carolina Blues	Skinny	Uncredited
1944	Thoroughbreds	Pvt. Mulrooney	
1945	Duck Pimples	Radio Actor	Voice role
1945	Hockey Homicide	Narrator	Voice role
1945	Cured Duck	Narrator	Voice role
1945	San Antonio	Entertainer in Cotulla saloon.	Uncredited
1947	Variety Girl	Entertainer in Spike Jones' band.	Uncredited
1948	Superman	Admin Bldg Guard at Metropolis University	Chapter 9 Uncredited
1949	Tennis Racquet	Radio Commentator	Voice role Uncredited
1952	Because of You	Toy Dealer	Uncredited
1953	Powder River	Barfly	Uncredited
1958	Hot Rod Gang	Wesley Cavendish	
1958	The Tunnel of Love	Escort	
1958	Frontier Gun	Eph Loveman	
1959	The 30 Foot Bride of Candy Rock	Booster	Uncredited
1959	The Rookie	Winchell	Uncredited
1961	The Great Impostor	Farmer Hauling Fertilizer	
1961	Ring of Fire	Mr. Hobart	Uncredited
1961	The Ladies Man	Soundman	
1961	The Errand Boy	Weaver	
1961	Pocketful of Miracles	Pool Player	
1963	The Birds	Fisherman Helping with Rental Boat	
1963	Tammy and the Doctor	Traction Patient	
1963	The Nutty Professor	Rube	Uncredited
1963	It's a Mad, Mad, Mad, Mad World	Hardware Store Clerk	Uncredited
1964	Mail Order Bride	Charlie Mary	
1964	A Tiger Walks	Bob Evans	Uncredited
1964	Quick, Before It Melts	Ham Operator	
1964	Kitten with a Whip	Salty Sam	
1965	The Rounders	Arlee	
1965	Zebra in the Kitchen	Nearsighted Man	
1965	Fluffy	Yokel	
1966	The Plainsman	Bartender	Uncredited
1967	The Adventures of Bullwhip Griffin	Man in Bathtub	Uncredited
1967	The Spirit Is Willing	Booper Mellish	
1967	Rosie!	Florist	
1967	The Road to Nashville	Colonel Feetlebaum	
1970	Which Way to the Front?	Van Koch	Uncredited
1970	Bigfoot	Forest Ranger	
1971	The Zodiac Killer	Doc	Credited as Doddles Weaver
1972	Cancel My Reservation	Cactus, Deputy Sheriff	
1972	A Ton of Grass Goes to Pot		
1974	Macon County Line	Augie	
1975	Trucker's Woman	Ben Turner	Alternative title: Truckin' Man
1975	The Wild McCullochs	Pop Holson	
1975	Sixpack Annie	Hank	
1975	White House Madness	Supreme Court Justice	
1975	Fugitive Lovers	Roy Dibbs	
1976	Won Ton Ton, the Dog Who Saved Hollywood	Man in Mexican Film	
1976	Cat Murkil and the Silks	Kelso	
1977	The Great Gundown	Baggage Man	Alternative title: Savage Red, Outlaw White
1977	Mule Feathers	Hotel Manager	
1981	Earthbound	Sterling	(final film role)

Television
Year	Title	Role	Notes
1956	Sheriff of Cochise	Joe Heap	Episode: "Caine and Abel"
1957	The Pied Piper of Hamelin	First Counselor	Television film Uncredited
1958	Club Oasis	Sea Captain	2 episodes
1959	Maverick	Lem	Episode: "Gun-Shy"
1960	You Bet Your Life	Himself-Contestant	Episode: "59-20"
1960	Sugarfoot	Simon Miller	Episode: "Journey to Provision"
1960	Fury	Jake	Episode: "Packy's Dilemma"
1960	Lawman	Jack Stiles	4 episodes
1960	The Tab Hunter Show	Messenger Boy	Episode: "I Love a Marine"
1961	Wagon Train	Efen Dirkin	Episode: "The Joe Muharich Story"
1961	Shannon	Shoes Malone	Episode: "The King Leal Report"
1961	Laramie	George	Episode: "Handful of Fire"
1962	The Dick Van Dyke Show	Bailiff	Episode: "One Angry Man"
1962	Mr. Smith Goes to Washington	Peavey Simpson	Episode: "The Country Sculptor"
1962	Dennis the Menace	Needy Man #2	Episode: "Poor Mr. Wilson"
1962	"The Joey Bishop Show"	Mr. Johnson	Episode: The Big Date
1963	Have Gun – Will Travel	Hildreth – General Store Prop.	Episode: "Shootout at Hogtooth"
1963	The Donna Reed Show	Charlie Brubaker	Episode: "The Handy Man"
1963	The Wide Country	Jones	Episode: "The Judas Goat"
1963	The Adventures of Ozzie & Harriet	Janitor	Episode: "Dave's Law Office"
1961–1963	The Andy Griffith Show	Various roles	2 episodes
1964	The Travels of Jaimie McPheeters	Pettigrew	Episode: " The Day of the Tin Trumpet"
1964	The Virginian	Stationmaster	Episode: "Rope of Lies"
1964	The Alfred Hitchcock Hour	Gregg	Episode: "Body In the Barn"
1965	Petticoat Junction	Chester Farnsworth	Episode: "The Curse of Chester Farnsworth"
1965	Laredo	Various roles	2 episodes
1966	Batman	Crier Tuck	2 episodes
1967	My Three Sons	Jesse Prouty	Episode: "The Good Earth"
1967	The Man from U.N.C.L.E.	Stationmaster	Episode: "The Pieces of Fate Affair"
1967	The Monkees	Butler	S1:E30, "Monkees Manhattan Style"
1967–70	Dragnet		Numerous episodes
1968	Land of the Giants	Giant Hobo	Episode: "Framed"
1971	The Jimmy Stewart Show	Halsted	Episode: "Pro Bono Publico"
1976	Banjo Hackett: Roamin' Free	Old Turkey	Television film
1976	Starsky and Hutch	Eddie Hoyle	Episodes: "The Bounty Hunter" S1, Ep22 & "Gillian" S2, Ep5
1979	Fantasy Island	Blindman	Episode: "Spending Spree/The Hunted"

== In popular culture ==
- Weaver's horse race routine has been quoted and parodied by many performers over the years.
- A children's board game called Homestretch featured horses named Cabbage, Banana, Girdle, and the misspelled/simplified "Beetle Bohm." This was a direct lift of Weaver's number, with Cabbage "leading by a head" and Beetle Bohm eventually winning the race.
- Mike Kazaleh's comic The Adventures of Captain Jack took place on the planet Pootwattle and featured a character who used many of Weaver's jokes and catchphrases, such as "That's a killer!"
- A one-page Weaver contribution to Mad magazine #25, September 1955, had him as Professor Feetlebaum grading student Abraham Lincoln's Gettysburg Address, complete with grammatical corrections and encouraging note despite the C minus.
