= The Road to Nashville =

- Directed by: Will Zens
- Written by: Will Zens
- Produced by: Robert Patrick; Marty Robbins
- Starring: Marty Robbins; Connie Smith
- Cinematography: Leif Rise; Vilmos Zsigmond
- Edited by: Michael David
- Production company: Robert Patrick Productions
- Distributed by: Crown International Pictures
- Release date: September 21, 1966
- Country: United States
- Language: English

The Road to Nashville is a 1967 American musical film directed by Will Zens and starring Marty Robbins and Connie Smith.

== Plot ==
This is a musical comedy about signing up singers to take part in a country music film. A Hollywood film company sends Colonel Feetlebaum (Doodles Weaver) to Nashville to round up talent to appear. A host of then-current country stars perform their hits.

== Cast ==
- Marty Robbins as himself
- Connie Smith as herself
- Doodles Weaver as Colonel Feetlebaum
- Richard Arlen as Studio Boss
- Ralph Emery as himself
- Johnny Cash as himself
- June Carter Cash as herself
- Waylon Jennings as himself
- Hank Snow as himself
- Norma Jean as herself
- Webb Pierce as himself
- Kitty Wells as herself
- Johnnie Wright as himself
- Ruby Wright as herself
- Bill Phillips as himself
- Faron Young as himself
- Lefty Frizzell as himself
- Margie Singleton as herself
- Bill Anderson as himself
- Dottie West as herself
- Porter Wagoner as himself
- The Carter Family as Themselves
- The Stoneman Family as Themselves
- The Osborne Brothers as Themselves
