= To the Shores of Hell =

1966 film by Will Zens

- Original film poster
- Directed by: Will Zens
- Written by: Robert McFadden; Will Zens
- Produced by: Will Zens; Robert Patrick
- Starring: Marshall Thompson; Richard Arlen; Robert Dornan
- Cinematography: Leif Rise
- Music by: William A. Schaefer
- Distributed by: Crown International Pictures
- Release date: March 16, 1966
- Running time: 82 minutes
- Country: United States
- Languages: English; Vietnamese

To the Shores of Hell is a 1966 Vietnam War film shot in Technicolor and Techniscope that was directed by Will Zens and starring Marshall Thompson, Richard Arlen, Dick O'Neill and Robert Dornan that was distributed by Crown International Pictures. Dornan may possibly have co-written the film as his mother's maiden name was "McFadden".

== Plot ==
After observing war game manoeuvers as a referee, U.S. Marine Major Greg Donahue is posted to Da Nang, South Vietnam for his second tour of duty. He hears that his physician brother Gary has been seen alive in the area after being captured by the Viet Cong. Donahue is accompanied by a Marine Sergeant, an American Priest who was formerly an Army chaplain in the Korean War and a Vietnamese guide to free his brother.

== Cast ==
- Marshall Thompson as Maj. Greg Donahue
- Richard Arlen as Brig. Gen. F.W. Ramsgate
- Robert Dornan as Dr. Gary Donahue
- Bill Bierd as Gunnery Sgt. Bill Gabreski
- Richard Jordahl as Father Jack Bourget
- Kiva Lawrence as Mary
- Freeman Lusk as Capt. Lusk
- Dick O'Neill as Maj. Fred Howard
- Jeff Pearl as Mick Phin
- Marvin Yim as Maj. Toang

== Production ==
Master Sergeant William V. Bierd was a Marine veteran of World War II, China, Korea, and Vietnam. Besides playing Sgt Gabreski, Bierd was an uncredited technical advisor on the film as well as a technical advisor on Marine Corps uniforms to Gomer Pyle USMC.

The US Marine Corps allowed Zens to film amphibious landing exercises at Camp Pendleton that appeared at the start of the film. A Marine Corps HUS-1 helicopter was provided for the climax.

Toward the end of the movie, a radio operator said, "Loud and Clear, Miss Muffet, hold one", played by Gregory S. Morrison, a Marine Corps Private Second Class, from Camp Pendleton (Note: The USMC does not have a Private Second Class. It should read Private First Class). When the movie played at the Northgate movie theater, adjacent to Texas A&M University, the marquee read "To the Shores of Hell - STARRING Gregory S. Morrison".
