= The Starfighters =

1964 film by Will Zens

- Theatrical release poster
- Directed by: Will Zens
- Written by: Will Zens
- Produced by: Will Zens
- Starring: Robert Dornan; Richard Jordahl; Richard Masters
- Cinematography: Leif Rise
- Edited by: Michael David
- Music by: Stephen Paul
- Production company: Riviera Productions
- Distributed by: Parade Releasing Organization
- Release date: March 25, 1964 (U.S.)
- Running time: 84 minutes
- Country: United States
- Language: English

The Starfighters is a 1964 American Cold War film written, produced and directed by Will Zens, and starring Bob Dornan, Richard Jordahl and Richard Masters. In 1976, pilot and actor Dornan won election as a U.S. congressman in California.

The Starfighters did not go into wide release. It was the subject of episode 12 of the sixth season of Comedy Central's Mystery Science Theater 3000 and was labeled one of their "10 most unwatchable films" viewed by Paste magazine.

== Plot ==
Lieutenant John "Junior" Witkowski (Bob Dornan) and his buddy, Lieutenant York (Steve Early), arrive at George Air Force Base, Tactical Air Command, in Southern California to train to fly the Lockheed F-104 Starfighter, with special emphasis on the complicated mid-air refueling maneuver.

Witkowski's congressman father (Carl Rogers), a famed World War II bomber pilot, frequently calls him, concerned about the safety of fighter aircraft. The congressman wants his son to be transferred to a Convair B-58 Hustler or Boeing B-52 Stratofortress bomber squadron in the Strategic Air Command. Witkowski also finds romance with Mary Davidson (Shirley Olmstead), an Iowa girl.

The film depicts pilots being instructed on firing the Sidewinder missile from the F-104 at flare decoys as stand-ins for MiG fighters.

During training, Major Stevens (Richard Jordahl) sends Witkowski, York and Lieutenant Lyons (Robert Winston) on a cross-country mission. The three trainees are forced to separate as they encounter a storm. Trainee Lyons made a mistake by either flying into or failing to navigate the severe weather, resulting in his aircraft crashing in the mountains. He was forced to bail out and parachute to safety. Witkowski is feared lost. Later, they learn that Lyons parachuted safely, and Witkowski has landed safely at an alternate base. Witkowski handled the emergency correctly by successfully navigating the storm and safely landing his plane at an alternate airbase. Another trainee also did the right thing by returning early to base before the storm worsened. Witkowski, who has impressed senior officers but disappointed his father by not taking another assignment, is among those selected to be transferred to a unit in Europe and bids a temporary good-bye to Mary.

== Cast ==
- Robert Dornan as Lieutenant John Witkowski Jr.
- Richard Jordahl as Major "Madge" Stevens
- Shirley Olmstead as Mary Davidson
- Richard Masters as Colonel Hunt
- Steve Early as Lieutenant York
- Robert Winston as Lieutenant Lyons
- Carl Rogers as Congressman John Witkowski
- Ralph Thomas as Captain O'Brien
- Joan Lougee as Betty Lyon

== Production ==
The catchline: "The blazing adventure of the men and planes who rocket to the very edge of space" and the poster showing a character with a full-face visor helmet similar to an astronaut belies the film's very evident "infomercial" look. The majority of The Starfighters deals with the training of F-104 pilots during the period when the aircraft was being introduced in the United States Air Force, and consists predominantly of stock footage. The footage was of the F-104s of the 831st Air Division (479th Tactical Fighter Wing), stationed at George AFB from October 1958.

The aircraft featured in The Starfighters included F-104A and C variants, the Boeing KC-135 Stratotanker, the Lockheed T-33 and the Kaman H-43B Huskie.

== Reception and legacy ==
The Starfighters was not given wide release and was soon relegated to drive-in theaters and second run showings. Although it was not critically reviewed, audience reaction since has continually placed it in the category of one of the "worst films" ever.

=== Appearance on MST3K ===
The Starfighters was featured in season six episode twelve of Mystery Science Theater 3000. The cast and crew (and later fans) of Mystery Science Theater 3000 were the film's most prominent critics. Tom Servo summed it up thus: "So basically, according to themselves, the Air Force is a bunch of leather-faced, not-so-bright, heavy drinking, dull-witted speed freaks who poop in their pants and can't make it with women, right?" The Mystery Science Theater 3000 Amazing Colossal Episode Guide complained "nothing happens in it." It provided several running gags that were repeated throughout the series: humming the jazzy music whenever an aircraft is seen flying, mentions of the "poopie suit" (an Air Force survival suit designed to help contain body heat in the event of a bailout over water), and the use of the word "refueling" as a synonym for any long, dull scene.

== Home media ==
The MST3K version of the film is included in the Mystery Science Theater 3000 Collection Volume 12 DVD set from Rhino Entertainment and later Shout Factory.
