= Fallguy =

- Directed by: Donn Harling
- Written by: Richard L. Adams (story and screenplay); George Mitchell (story and screenplay)
- Produced by: Donn Harling (producer)
- Starring: See below
- Cinematography: Vilis Lapenieks
- Edited by: Ron Honthaner
- Music by: Jaime Mendoza-Nava
- Distributed by: Fairway International
- Release date: 1962
- Running time: 64 minutes
- Country: United States
- Language: English

Fallguy is a 1962 American film directed by Donn Harling. The plot revolves around a teenage boy who helps an accident victim only to find himself enveloped political corruption, racketeering, and charged with a murder he did not commit.

== Cast ==
- Ed Dugan as Sonny Martin
- George Mitchell as Carl Tamin
- Louis Gartner as Police Chief
- Don Alderette as Sam Johnson
- Madeline Frances as June Johnson
- Dick O'Neill
