= Hot Summer in Barefoot County =

- Poster for 'Hot Summer in Barefoot County'
- Directed by: Will Zens
- Produced by: W. Henry Smith
- Starring: Don Jones; Sherry Robinson; Charles Elledge; Jeff MacKay; Tonia Bryan; Mike Muscat
- Cinematography: Austin McKinney
- Music by: W. Henry Smith
- Distributed by: Preacherman Corporation; Troma Entertainment (reissue)
- Release date: 1974
- Running time: 95 minutes
- Country: United States
- Language: English

Hot Summer in Barefoot County is a 1974 comedy film directed by Will Zens and produced & distributed by Preacherman Corporation. The plot involves an undercover agent who is sent to a small southern town in order to uncover an underground moon-shining ring, but when he finds out that the town is filled with voluptuous women ready to satisfy his every need, things start to get confusing.

== Plot ==
Upstate policeman Jeff Wilson is sent undercover to a small southern town called Barefoot County to bust an alleged moon-shining operation. He is warned by the police chief of how previous investigations had failed due to uncooperative locals and the county's proud sheriff Bull Tatum, who resists help from outside law enforcement.

Meanwhile, the Barefoot bootlegging business is discreetly operated by the widow Stella Holcomb and her three daughters, Rosa Lee, Vicky, and Mary Ann, who conveniently reside just outside of Tatum's jurisdiction in Red Rock County. Dressed as a man, Mary Ann secretly delivers the moonshine to local gas station and diner owner Otis Perkins. In a desperate crack down effort, Sheriff Tatum and his deputy Clyde set up roadblocks to search incoming cars, but Mary Ann easily evades them.

Upon coming into town, Wilson is run off the road by Perkins's troublesome sons, Culley Joe, Clarence, and Junior. He is found unconscious by the Holcombs, who immediately take him in for recovery. A country savvy Wilson remains undercover, telling the Holcombs that he is simply in search of work. As he continues to stay with the family and begins work at Perkins's gas station, he and Mary Ann develop feelings for each other; Culley Joe becomes jealous and clashes with Wilson. Sheriff Tatum also grows suspicious of his presence.

As Wilson beings to uncover the Holcombs’ and Perkins's operation, the tomcat Perkins boys ambush the unattended Holcomb girls at a swimming hole. When Culley Joe forces himself onto Mary Ann, Wilson intervenes and fights the boys off, promising to protect her. He later gives Mary Ann his mother's pin to quell her doubts of his genuine feelings for her. Mary Ann privately begins to regret the family's illegal business, as Wilson becomes conflicted with his feelings for Mary Ann and his discovery of the Holcombs.

One night, Tatum discovers his daughter Nadine's sexual affair with Culley Joe and angrily arranges a shotgun wedding. At the afterparty, Wilson leaves to investigate the Holcombs’ moonshine distillery, but Tatum follows him. Upon confrontation, Wilson reveals his undercover status and presents his police credentials, which Tatum accepts and inquires about the moonshiners’ identities. Wilson, however, lies to cover for the Holcombs, telling Tatum that they have already been arrested. They then destroy the distillery.

When they return to the party, Tatum publicly announces the discovery of the moonshining operation and reveals the truth about Wilson, angering Mrs. Holcomb and breaking Mary Ann's heart. Disgraced, Wilson returns home and decides not to reveal his findings to the police chief. He reconciles with the Holcombs and Perkins, telling them that he has resigned his special agent position. Wilson then returns to Red Rock Country to reunite with Mary Ann, and secretly helps the family rebuild their distillery.

== Cast ==
Don Jones as Special Agent Jeff Wilson

== Production ==
Filming took place in North Carolina and South Carolina from the fall of 1973 to the spring of 1974.

== See also ==
- List of American films of 1974
