= Ritchie Perry =

British writer

Ritchie Perry (born 1942) is a British writer of spy and adventure crime fiction. He has also written novels under the name John Allen, as well as a book on Brazil and some books for children. Perry died in February 2022.

== Works ==
- The fall guy, 1972
- A hard man to kill, 1973
- Ticket to ride, 1973
- Holiday with a vengeance, 1974
- Your money and your wife, 1975
- One good death deserves another, 1976
- Brazil: the land and its people, 1977
- Dead end, 1977
- Dutch courage, 1978
- Bishop's pawn, 1979
- Grand slam, 1980
- Fool's mate, 1981
- Foul up, 1982
- MacAllister, 1984
- Kolwezi, 1985
- Presumed dead, 1987
- Comeback, 1991
