= The Fall Guy (soundtrack) =

The Fall Guy (Original Motion Picture Soundtrack)

Soundtrack album by Dominic Lewis and various artists
- Released: May 3, 2024
- Recorded: 2023–2024
- Studios: Abbey Road, London; AIR, London; The Village, Los Angeles
- Genre: Film soundtrack
- Length: 60:01
- Label: Back Lot Music
- Producer: Dominic Lewis

Dominic Lewis chronology
Lift (2024)	The Fall Guy (2024)	Love Hurts (2025)

Singles from The Fall Guy (Original Motion Picture Soundtrack)
- 1. "I Was Made for Lovin' You" Released: April 26, 2024; 2. "Unknown Stuntman (Fall Guy Theme)" Released: May 2, 2024

The Fall Guy (Original Motion Picture Soundtrack) is the soundtrack to the 2024 film of the same name directed by David Leitch, starring Ryan Gosling and Emily Blunt. The soundtrack featured 24 tracks, with three songs and the remainder consisting of original score composed by Dominic Lewis. It was released by Back Lot Music on May 3, 2024, alongside the film.

== Development ==
Dominic Lewis was assigned as the composer after previously working with Leitch on Bullet Train (2022). Lewis started working on the score during the pre-production stage where he received the script from Leitch and began writing the music based on the ideas he provided from the script. The music went through several iterations thereafter. The first piece written was the end credits song, which was an "old school love ballad" as Leitch suggested. Afterwards, he wrote several score suites for the film. The music from the 1970s and 1980s served as the inspiration for the film score, which matched the film's tone.

Rachel Levy was assigned as the music supervisor. Producer Kelly McCormick wanted a Taylor Swift song to be played in the sequence where Colt (Gosling) reminisces of his times with Jody (Blunt), which Gosling had agreed. Though being unable to decide on which song to be played, he came up with "All Too Well" being a perfect fit for the sequence. The license to the song was secured even before the Eras Tour. The song "I Was Made for Lovin' You" (1979) by the hard rock band Kiss was initially refused by McCormick and the Universal Pictures' president Peter Cramer, but Leitch was insistent on using the song as the band's music was "crystallizing the tone of the movie for me, which was equal parts camp and cool". It was deciphered as the challenging song to get clearance, according to Levy, but as Leitch wanted it to use as a needledrop throughout the film, Lewis deconstructed and integrated the song into his theme and Yungblud covered the song for the film. This resulted in being the "beating heart of the film's soundtrack". The song "You Oughta Know" by Alanis Morissette was excluded from the film during its edit.

Besides the pre-existing songs in the film, the soundtrack had an original song "Unknown Stuntman", a take of the original theme from the television series performed by Blake Shelton. Though Gosling was intended to perform the theme song for the film, he refrained from doing so.

== Release ==
"I Was Made for Lovin' You" was released as a single on April 26, 2024, through Geffen Records. The theme song "Unknown Stuntman" performed by Shelton was released on May 2, 2024. The soundtrack in its entirety was released on May 3, 2024, alongside the film by Back Lot Music. It is further set to be released on 140-gram double LP explosion-colored vinyl featuring three liner notes from Leitch, on August 2, 2024.

== Critical reception ==
Alci Rengifo of Entertainment Voice wrote "Dominic Lewis' score even sounds like a satirical jab at Hans Zimmer"s tribal sounds for Dune." Richard Brody of The New Yorker described it as "high-octane", while Bilge Ebiri of Vulture called it "energetic". Glenn Whipp of Los Angeles Times described it as an enjoyable soundtrack. Liz Shannon Miller of Consequence wrote that "the songs are well-chosen, with just a touch of randomness".

== Track listing ==
The Fall Guy (Original Motion Picture Soundtrack) track listing
No.	Title	Artist(s)	Length
1.	"I Was Made for Lovin' You"	Yungblud	4:22
2.	"Unknown Stuntman (Fall Guy Theme)"	Blake Shelton	2:40
3.	"Thumbs Up"		2:16
4.	"Metalstorm"		0:37
5.	"Third-Degree Burn"		0:54
6.	"Sexy Bacon"		2:30
7.	"Owner of a Lonely Heart"		1:44
8.	"Dead Guy On Ice"		1:29
9.	"Fruit Plate"		1:01
10.	"Bon Garçon"		0:52
11.	"Ball Biter"		1:45
12.	"Post-It Party"		1:14
13.	"Ducking Autocorrect"		2:12
14.	"Attaque!"		2:02
15.	"Miami Grilled Cheese"		5:49
16.	"I Was Made for Lovin' You" (orchestral version)	Yungblud; Dominic Lewis	4:48
17.	"Chef's Kiss"		1:13
18.	"High Noon at the End of the Universe"		1:55
19.	"Pyro Prep"		1:01
20.	"Wire Straits"		4:39
21.	"The Fall Guy"		5:25
22.	"Waiting for Love"		3:46
23.	"Unsung Heroes"		2:17
24.	"Ain't No Galaxy"		3:30
Total length:			60:01

== Curated soundtrack ==
The film features the list of songs, which were not released as a part of the official soundtrack or separately as a compilation album.

- "I Was Made For Lovin' You" – Kiss
- "A Man Without Love" - Engelbert Humperdinck
- "Fiesta" – Mariachi La Estrella
- "Thunderstruck" – AC/DC
- "All Too Well (Taylor's Version)" – Taylor Swift
- "All I Do Is Win" – DJ Khaled (feat. T-Pain, Ludacris, Snoop Dogg and Rick Ross)
- "I Believe in a Thing Called Love" – The Darkness
- "Genie in a Bottle" – Christina Aguilera
- "Looks That Kill" – Mötley Crüe
- "Against All Odds (Take A Look At Me Now)" – Phil Collins
- "I Hate Myself For Loving You" – Joan Jett and the Blackhearts

== Personnel ==
Credits adapted from Film Music Reporter:

- All music composed and produced by Dominic Lewis

Orchestra

- Conductor – Gavin Greenaway
- Orchestrator – Tommy Laurence
- Additional orchestrations by – Stephen Coleman, Andrew Kinney, Geoff Lawson, Michael Lloyd, Tutti Music Partners
- Orchestra leader – Everton Nelson
- Orchestra contractors – Jenny Goshawk, Isobel Griffiths

Featured musicians

- Bass – Laurence Cottle
- Guitar – Tommy Everton
- Drums – Doug Harper

Technical

- Score programming – Daniel Futcher, Tom Skyrme
- Recorded at Abbey Road Studios and AIR Studios, London
- Recording engineers – Sam Okell, Nick Wollage
- Score recordist – Chris Parker, Marta Di Nozzi, George Oulton
- Assistant engineers – Marta Di Nozzi, George Oulton
- Mixed at The Village, Los Angeles
- Mixing engineer – Al Clay
- Mixing assistants – Mark Knight, Joyie Lai
- Music editors – Angie Rubin, Dan Pinder
- Librarians – Jill Streater, Ann Barnard
- Music preparation – Global Music Service

== Release history ==
Release history and formats for The Fall Guy (Original Motion Picture Soundtrack)
Region	Date	Format(s)	Label	Ref.
Various	May 3, 2024	Digital download; streaming	Back Lot Music	
Various	August 2, 2024	Vinyl	Back Lot Music	
