= Bob Dornan =

American politician (born 1933)

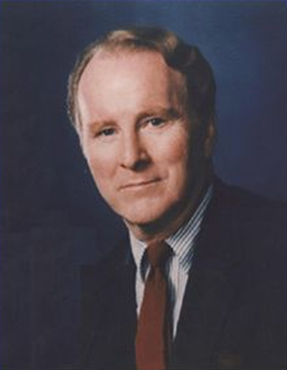

Member of the U.S. House of Representatives from California
- In office January 3, 1985 – January 3, 1997
- Preceded by: Jerry M. Patterson
- Succeeded by: Loretta Sanchez
- Constituency: 38th district (1985–1993); 46th district (1993–1997)
- In office January 3, 1977 – January 3, 1983
- Preceded by: Alphonzo E. Bell Jr.
- Succeeded by: Mel Levine
- Constituency: 27th district

Personal details
- Born: Robert Kenneth Dornan; April 3, 1933 (age 93) New York City, New York, U.S.
- Party: Republican
- Spouse: Sallie Hansen (m. 1955)
- Children: 5
- Education: Loyola Marymount University

Military service
- Allegiance: United States
- Branch/service: United States Air Force; United States Air Force Reserve
- Years of service: 1953–1958 (active); 1958–1975 (reserve)
- Rank: Captain
- Unit: California Air National Guard

Robert Kenneth Dornan (born April 3, 1933) is an American actor, radio talk show host, combat veteran, and Republican politician from California. Dornan represented two Southern California districts in the United States House of Representatives from 1977 to 1983 and from 1985 to 1997, where he became known as a "leading firebrand" on the party's conservative wing. He unsuccessfully sought the Republican nomination for the United States Senate in 1982 and for President of the United States in 1996.

A former actor and television and radio talk show host, Dornan had a flair for the dramatic that drew supporters and detractors well beyond his congressional district. Though never a major power in Washington, he became one of the most well-known members of the House of Representatives as a participant in televised "special orders" speeches and was described as "one of the leading firebrands among American politicians". He has become well known for publicly outing fellow Republican U.S. Representative Steve Gunderson as gay on the House of Representatives floor in 1994.

== Early life ==
Dornan was born in New York City, the son of Gertrude (McFadden) Dornan (1900–1967) and Harry Joseph Dornan (1892–1975). In New York, Dornan's mother had been a vaudeville performer as part of an act called the McFadden Sisters and a Ziegfeld Follies showgirl, and had performed under the stage name Bara Wilkes; her sister was the wife of actor Jack Haley. Harry Dornan owned a haberdashery. After moving to California, he became a real estate entrepreneur in West Los Angeles. He was active in harness racing, a pastime in which many celebrities participated during the 1940s and 1950s. Robert Dornan took advantage of his family's entertainment industry experience and connections after he embarked on his own acting and talk show career. He used celebrity endorsements and campaign contributions to launch his political career.

Dornan attended Loyola University of Los Angeles (later renamed Loyola Marymount University) from 1950 to 1953. At age 19, Robert joined the United States Air Force. He became a fighter pilot, and during his time in the Air Force, he survived two emergency parachute ejections and two "dead stick" forced landings (including one of an F-100). He was on active duty until 1958, and attained the rank of captain. He served in the California Air National Guard and Air Force Reserve until retiring in 1975. Dornan also served as a combat journalist and photographer on several missions in Vietnam, Laos, and Cambodia during the Vietnam War and flew relief flights into Biafra.

== Career ==
=== Entertainment ===
Dornan was involved in the entertainment industry as an actor. He starred in the film The Starfighters, cast as Lt. Witkowski, an Air Force pilot who was the son of a U.S. congressman. The Starfighters aired on Mystery Science Theater 3000 on October 29, 1994.

In 1962, he portrayed Air Force Lieutenant Alden in the episode "Dennis at Boot Camp" of the CBS sitcom Dennis the Menace, starring Jay North and Gale Gordon, with Roy Roberts in this segment as Captain Stone.

In 1966 he co-starred in and possibly co-wrote To the Shores of Hell.

Dornan had a frequent role as Captain Fowler on ABC's 12 O'Clock High television series and smaller roles on ABC's Bewitched and NBC's I Dream of Jeannie. Dornan was an Emmy-award-winning television talk show host on Tempo and The Robert K. Dornan Show broadcast from Los Angeles from 1967 to 1973.

=== Politics ===
Dornan has said he took an active role in the civil rights movement. He did attend the historic 1963 March on Washington led by Martin Luther King Jr.; when this claim was questioned in 1994, he circulated a photo of himself in his Air Force uniform seated in the audience for King's speech. News accounts also indicate he participated in voter registration drives for African Americans in Mississippi. However, a 1998 Washington Post article indicated there is no corroborating information (such as news clippings from the era) to confirm this claim.

Dornan moved into politics in 1973 as national spokesman for the Citizens for Decency Through Law advocacy group. He made an unsuccessful run for mayor of Los Angeles the same year. In 1976, Dornan was elected to the House of Representatives, representing the 27th congressional district in western Los Angeles County. He was re-elected twice. He was such an unswerving advocate for the development of the B-1 bomber, that he was soon nicknamed "B-1 Bob".

In November 1977, he was an opposition speaker at the 1977 National Women's Conference with Lottie Beth Hobbs, Dr. Mildred Jefferson, Phyllis Schlafly and Nellie Gray.

After the 1980 census, California's congressional map was redrawn. Dornan's district, previously a Republican-leaning swing district, was made significantly more Democratic. Believing he had no chance of winning this new district, he opted to run for the United States Senate in 1982. He finished fourth in the Republican primary behind San Diego mayor and future Governor Pete Wilson, who won in November.

Dornan moved to Garden Grove, in the more Republican Orange County. In 1984, he was elected to Congress from the 38th district in central Orange County, defeating 10-year Democratic incumbent Jerry M. Patterson by a 53% to 45% margin amid Ronald Reagan's massive landslide that year. In 1986, he won a tough race against Democratic state Assemblyman Richard Robinson, winning by a 55% to 43% margin. He was re-elected four more times and served on the Intelligence Committee.

Dornan made headlines in March 1985 for a confrontation with Representative Thomas Downey (a Democrat from New York) on the House floor. Downey asked Dornan about comments he had made calling Downey "a draft-dodging wimp". (Downey was exempt from the Vietnam War draft because of a perforated eardrum.) According to Downey, Dornan, grabbing him by collar and tie, said, "It's good you're being protected by the sergeant-at-arms. If I saw you outside, it would be a different story" and threatened him "with some form of bodily harm". Dornan claimed he was merely straightening Downey's tie and refused to apologize for the incident or the derogatory comment. A Dornan aide said, "It will be a cold day in hell before he gets an apology from Bob Dornan".

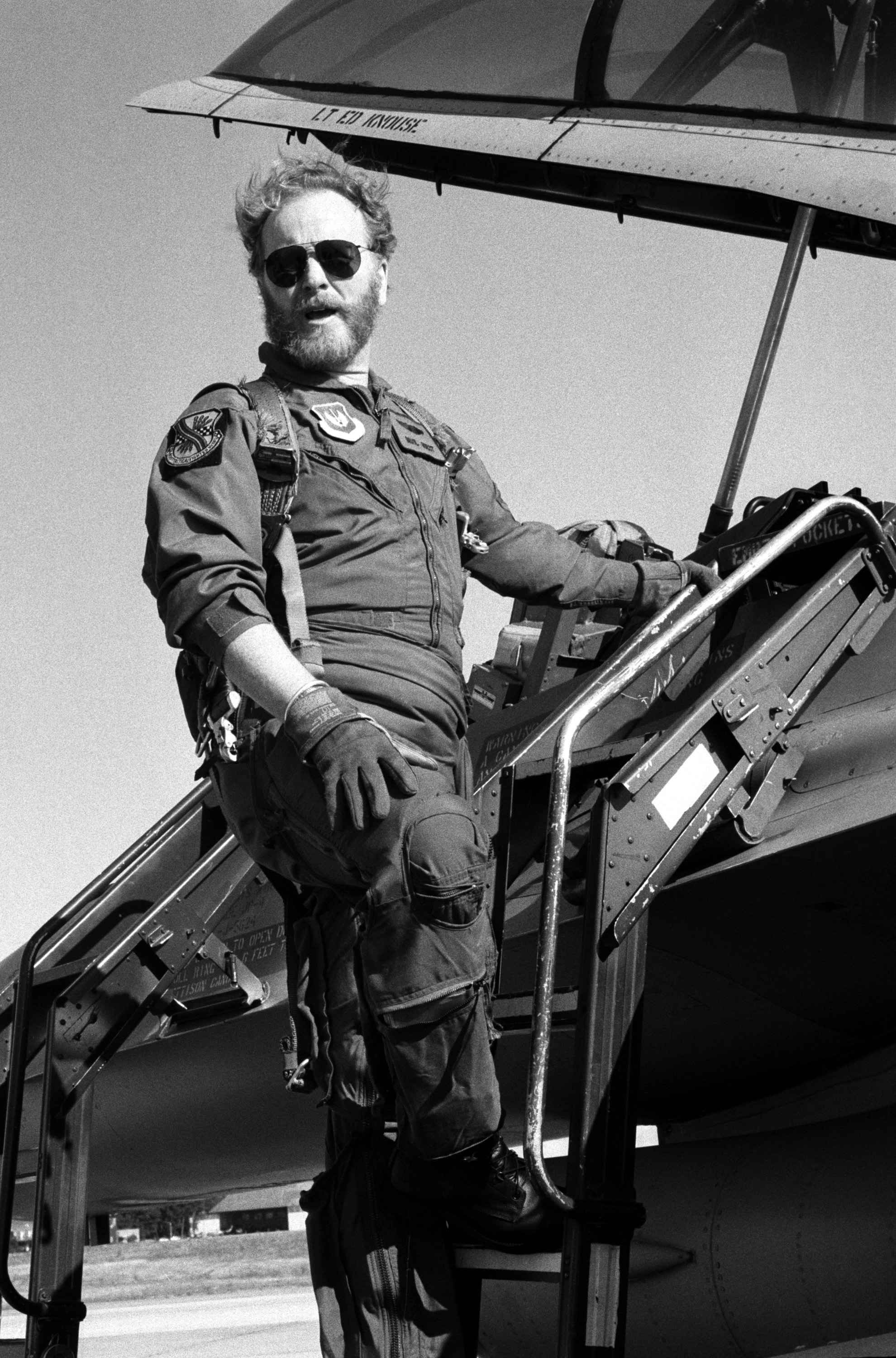
Dornan standing on the ladder of an F-16 Fighting Falcon aircraft during a visit to Torrejon Air Base, Spain, September 20, 1988

Dornan's record was staunchly conservative. However, he did hold some positions that some might call liberal, including sponsoring animal protection acts, earning him the recognition of PETA in 1988. During the summers of 1991 and 1992, future U.S. representative Randy Fine was an assistant for Dornan.

In 1994, during his final successful run for Congress, it was reported that Dornan's wife, Sallie, had made multiple allegations of domestic violence against him earlier in their marriage. In 1966, Dornan had been convicted of a domestic violence offense and sentenced to jail time; however, it was unclear whether his sentence had ever been served. After the allegations were made public, Sallie Dornan retracted them, stating that she had made false claims about her husband during a period when she was struggling with prescription drug addiction. The Dornans' five children asserted that their father had not been physically abusive. During the same campaign, Dornan had signs posted at polling places that warned voters in Spanish that they should be prepared to prove their citizenship in order to vote. The signs suggested that immigration officials would be present at the polls. The success of this action was believed to have kept enough Latino voters away from the polls to eke out a victory for Dornan against Mike Farber.

In 1995, Dornan received a minor reprimand from the House for stating in a floor speech that President Bill Clinton had "given aid and comfort to the enemy" during the Vietnam War.

Dornan was a dark horse candidate for president of the United States in 1996. In a GOP debate in Iowa on January 13, Dornan called Clinton a "criminal" and a "pathological liar". Dornan later dropped out of the presidential race and ran for reelection to his seat in the House; he was defeated by Democrat Loretta Sanchez by less than 1,000 votes.

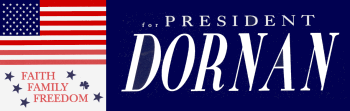
Dornan ran for president in 1996.

Following the narrow defeat, Dornan alleged that Sanchez's winning margin was provided by illegal voting from non-U.S. citizens. A thirteen-month House of Representatives investigation ensued, during which Sanchez was seated provisionally, pending the inquiry. A task force found 748 votes that had been cast illegally—624 from non-citizens in addition to 124 that had already been thrown out by California officials. This was not enough to overturn Sanchez's margin of victory and she was allowed to keep her seat. However, in consultation with the INS, the House committee identified 4,762 questionable registration affidavits.

In September 1997, while his 1996 bid against Sanchez was still being contested, Dornan confronted then-Representative Bob Menendez on the House floor, using profanity and calling Menendez an "anti-Catholic coward". This encounter led to Menendez filing a resolution to bar Dornan from the House floor until the election was resolved, which passed by a vote of 289–65.

==== Controversial statements ====
During his political career, Dornan became known for his controversial or offensive statements. Among his remarks:

- During a House debate in 1994, Dornan outed fellow Republican representative Steve Gunderson, accusing him of having a "revolving door on his closet."
- In a 1986 U.S. House speech, he called Soviet journalist Vladimir Posner a "disloyal, betraying little Jew who sits there on television claiming that he is somehow or other a newsman." This was the only statement Dornan apologized for, saying, "That's the only thing in my life I ever lost sleep over." Dornan also said that he intended "to say 'Judas', not 'Jew'," as a rebuttal to Posner's insistence that the Soviet Union was free of anti-Semitism.
- "Every lesbian spear chucker in this country is hoping I get defeated" to a Los Angeles television reporter in 1992 regarding a female challenger in the primary election.
- On a January 28, 1994, appearance on Politically Incorrect, Dornan declared it was "The Year of the Penis" due to recent events in the news. This was a joke in regard to the 1992 media and political reference as that election being referred to as "The Year of the Woman", when four women won election to the United States Senate.
- "You are a slimy coward. Go register in another party" to Orange County Republican Central Committee member William Dougherty after he supported Dornan's opponent in 1996.

In 1994, a 120-page book of quotations of Dornan was compiled by Nathan Callahan and William Payton and published as Shut Up, Fag! The quotation that gives the book the title was actually shouted by Dornan's wife, Sallie, at an AIDS activist during an Orange County town forum. Dornan claimed the book was backed by director Oliver Stone, whom Dornan labeled "a Bolshevik enemy".

Dornan's comments and behavior led his political opponents to question his mental health. Mike Kaspar of the Orange County Democratic Party said, "The primary issue is Bob Dornan, himself. I think his character and his own sanity are an issue here." At a White House Correspondents Dinner, Al Franken, who had worked once on Politically Incorrect with Dornan, joked "having Al D'Amato leading an ethics investigation is like getting Bob Dornan to head up a mental health task force." Michael Moore devoted an entire chapter of his book Downsize This! to his efforts to get Dornan involuntarily committed for psychiatric examination.

=== Later career ===
Dornan ran against Loretta Sanchez again in 1998, but was defeated.

In the late 1990s and early 2000s, Dornan hosted The Bob Dornan Show, a radio talk show syndicated nationally by Talk Radio Network.

In 2004, Dornan challenged Congressman Dana Rohrabacher, a fellow Republican, in the primary. Dornan charged Rohrabacher with being soft on terrorism and being too close to Islamic extremists. However, he lost by 84% to 16%.

During the summer of 2005, Dornan briefly expressed interest in the 48th congressional district seat that became vacant when then U.S. Congressman Christopher Cox resigned to become chairman of the U.S. Securities and Exchange Commission. He was interested in running as the nominee of the American Independent Party but did not, allegedly rebuffed by party officials.

== Personal life ==
In 1955, Dornan married Sallie Hansen. They have five children.

== Filmography ==
=== Film ===
Year	Title	Role	Notes
1960	The Great Impostor	Reporter	Uncredited
1961	X-15	Test Engineer	Uncredited
1963	A Gathering of Eagles	Non-Com	Uncredited
1964	The Starfighters	Lt. John Witkowski	
1965	Harlow	Photographer	Uncredited
1966	To the Shores of Hell	Dr. Gary Donahue	
1967	Hell on Wheels	Steve Robbins	
2005	Missing, Presumed Dead: The Search for America's POWs	Himself	Documentary

=== Television ===
Year	Title	Role	Notes
1960	Men into Space	Radio Operator	Episode: "Verdict in Orbit"
1962	Have Gun – Will Travel	Dandy	Episode: "Darwin's Man"
1962	Dennis the Menace	Lt. Alden	Episode: "Dennis at Boot Camp"
1965	Bewitched	Policeman	Episode: "Red Light, Green Light"
1965	I Dream of Jeannie	Carson	Episode: "The Yacht Murder Case"
1965–1967	12 O'Clock High	Bob Fowler	25 episodes
1966	The Fugitive	Doctor	Episode: "Shadow of the Swan"
1968	The Rat Patrol	German Sergeant	Episode: "The Touch and Go Raid"
1971	Ironside	Paul (The Body)	Episode: "If a Body See a Body"

U.S. House of Representatives
Preceded by Alphonzo E. Bell Jr.	Member of the U.S. House of Representatives from California's 27th congressional district 1977–1983	Succeeded by Mel Levine
Preceded by Jerry M. Patterson	Member of the U.S. House of Representatives from California's 38th congressional district 1985–1993	Succeeded by Steve Horn
New constituency	Member of the U.S. House of Representatives from California's 46th congressional district 1993–1997	Succeeded by Loretta Sanchez
U.S. order of precedence (ceremonial)
Preceded by Toby Roth as Former U.S. Representative	Order of precedence of the United States as Former U.S. Representative	Succeeded by Dan Lungren as Former U.S. Representative
