= List of American films of 2008 =

This is a list of American films released in 2008.

== Box office ==
The highest-grossing American films released in 2008, by domestic box office gross revenue, are as follows:

Highest-grossing films of 2008
Rank	Title	Distributor	Domestic gross
1	The Dark Knight	Warner Bros.	$533,345,358
2	Iron Man	Paramount	$318,604,126
3	Indiana Jones and the Kingdom of the Crystal Skull	Paramount	$317,101,119
4	Hancock	Sony	$227,946,274
5	WALL-E	Disney	$223,808,164
6	Kung Fu Panda	Paramount	$215,434,591
7	Twilight	Summit Entertainment	$192,769,854
8	Madagascar: Escape 2 Africa	Paramount	$180,010,950
9	Quantum of Solace	Sony	$168,368,427
10	Horton Hears a Who!	20th Century Fox	$154,529,439

== January–March ==
Opening		Title	Production company	Cast and crew	Ref.
J A N U A R Y	2	The Killing of John Lennon	IFC First Take	Andrew Piddington (director/screenplay); Jonas Ball, Krisha Fairchild, Gunter Stern, Gail Kay Bell, Mie Omori, Robert C. Kirk	
J A N U A R Y	4	One Missed Call	Warner Bros. Pictures / Alcon Entertainment / Kadokawa Pictures	Eric Valette (director); Andrew Klavan (screenplay); Shannyn Sossamon, Edward Burns, Ana Claudia Talancón, Ray Wise, Azura Skye, Johnny Lewis, Jason Beghe, Margaret Cho, Meagan Good, Rhoda Griffis, Ariel Winter, Dave Spector, Laura Harring, Wilbur Fitzgerald, Raegan Lamb, Karen Bayer, Mary Lynn Owen, Roy McCrerey, Greg Corbett, Bart Hansard, Katie Kneeland, Jason Horgan, Kaira Akita, Lauren Peyton, Dawn Dininger, Sarah Jean Kubik	
J A N U A R Y	9	The Business of Being Born	Red Envelope Entertainment / New Line Home Entertainment	Abby Epstein (director)	
J A N U A R Y	11	First Sunday	Screen Gems / Cube Vision	David E. Talbert (director/screenplay); Ice Cube, Katt Williams, Tracy Morgan, Loretta Devine, Michael Beach, Keith David, Regina Hall, Retta, Malinda Williams, Chi McBride, Clifton Powell, Nicholas Turturro, Olivia Cole, Red Grant, C.J. Sanders, Rickey Smiley, Arjay Smith, P.J. Byrne, Paul Campbell, Tiffany Pollard, Jasmine Masters	
J A N U A R Y	11	In the Name of the King	Freestyle Releasing / Boll KG / Brightlight Pictures	Uwe Boll (director); Doug Taylor (screenplay); Jason Statham, Leelee Sobieski, Ron Perlman, John Rhys-Davies, Claire Forlani, Matthew Lillard, Kristanna Loken, Will Sanderson, Tania Saulnier, Brian J. White, Ray Liotta, Burt Reynolds, Mike Dopud, Gabrielle Rose, Terence Kelly, Colin Ford	
J A N U A R Y	11	The Pirates Who Don't Do Anything: A VeggieTales Movie	Universal Pictures / Big Idea Productions	Mike Nawrocki (director); Phil Vischer (screenplay); Phil Vischer, Mike Nawrocki, Cam Clarke, Yuri Lowenthal, Laura Gerow, Alan Lee, Tim Hodge, Megan Murphy, Cydney Trent, Keri Pisapia, Sondra Morton Chaffin, Drake Lyle, Ally Nawrocki, Jim Poole, Joe Spadford, Brian Roberts, Andy Youssi, John Wahba, Patrick Kramer	
J A N U A R Y	18	27 Dresses	20th Century Fox / Fox 2000 Pictures / Spyglass Entertainment	Anne Fletcher (director); Aline Brosh McKenna (screenplay); Katherine Heigl, James Marsden, Malin Åkerman, Edward Burns, Judy Greer, Melora Hardin, Michael Ziegfeld, Brian Kerwin, Maulik Pancholy, David Castro, Krysten Ritter, Peyton List, Charli Barcena	
J A N U A R Y	18	Cassandra's Dream	The Weinstein Company	Woody Allen (director/screenplay); Hayley Atwell, Colin Farrell, Sally Hawkins, Ewan McGregor, Tom Wilkinson, John Benfield, Clare Higgins, Ashley Madekwe, Andrew Howard, Phil Davis, Jim Carter, Richard Lintern, Jennifer Higham, Lee Whitlock, Hugh Rathbone, Allan Ramsey, Paul Marc Davis, Terry Budin-Jones, Franck Viano, Tommy Mack	
J A N U A R Y	18	Cloverfield	Paramount Pictures / Bad Robot	Matt Reeves (director); Drew Goddard (screenplay); Michael Stahl-David, Mike Vogel, Odette Yustman, Lizzy Caplan, T.J. Miller, Jessica Lucas, Theo Rossi, Brian Klugman, Kelvin Yu, Liza Lapira, Lili Mirojnick, Ben Feldman, Baron Vaughn, Charlyne Yi, Rick Overton, Jason Cerbone, Pavel Lychnikoff, Billy Brown, Scott Lawrence, Tim Griffin, Chris Mulkey, Margot Farley, Matt Reeves	
J A N U A R Y	18	Mad Money	Overture Films / Millennium Films	Callie Khouri (director); Glenn Gers (screenplay); Diane Keaton, Queen Latifah, Katie Holmes, Ted Danson, Roger Cross, Adam Rothenberg, Stephen Root, J.C. MacKenzie, Christopher McDonald, Finesse Mitchell, Bryan Massey, Meagen Fay, Marc Macaulay, Peyton Alex Smith, Jim Cramer	
J A N U A R Y	18	Teeth	Roadside Attractions	Mitchell Lichtenstein (director/screenplay); Jess Weixler, John Hensley, Josh Pais, Hale Appleman, Ashley Springer, Lenny Von Dohlen, Vivienne Benesch, Julia Garro, Adam Wagner, Trent Moore, Ava Ryen Plumb, Hunter Ulvog	
J A N U A R Y	25	How She Move	Paramount Vantage / MTV Films	Ian Iqbal Rashid (director); Annmarie Morais (screenplay); Rutina Wesley, Dwain Murphy, Clé Bennett, Romina D'Ugo, Kevin Duhaney, Shawn Desman, Nina Dobrev, Brennan Gademans, Tré Armstrong, Jai Jai Jones, Tristan D. Lalla, Merwin Mondesir, Daniel Morrison, Boyd Banks, Ardon Bess, Ingrid Gaynor, Melanie Nicholls-King, Brian Paul, Tanisha Scott, Alison-Sealy Smith, Djanet Sears, Romina D'Ugo, Keyshia Cole, DeRay Davis, Kardinal Offishall, Mýa	
J A N U A R Y	25	Meet the Spartans	20th Century Fox / Regency Enterprises	Jason Friedberg, Aaron Seltzer (directors/screenplay); Sean Maguire, Kevin Sorbo, Carmen Electra, Ken Davitian, Diedrich Bader, Travis Van Winkle, Jareb Dauplaise, Nicole Parker, Ike Barinholtz, Hunter Clary, Phil Morris, Method Man, Ryan Fraley, Tiffany Claus, Nick Steele, Tony Yalda, Christopher Lett, Jim Piddock, Nate Haden, Crista Flanagan, Thomas McKenna, Jesse Lewis IV, Jenny Costa, Belinda Waymouth, Dean Cochran, Emily Wilson, John Di Domenico, Jim Nieb, Tiffany Haddish, Zachary Dylan Smith, Robin Atkin Downes	
J A N U A R Y	25	Minutemen	Disney Channel	Lev L. Spiro (director); John Killoran, Bill Tobin (screenplay); Jason Dolley, Luke Benward, Nicholas Braun, Chelsea Staub, J.P. Manoux, Steven R. McQueen, Kara Crane, Dexter Darden, Kellie Cockrell, Molly Jepson	
J A N U A R Y	25	Rambo	Lionsgate / The Weinstein Company / Millennium Films / Equity Pictures	Sylvester Stallone (director/screenplay); Art Monterastelli (screenplay); Sylvester Stallone, Julie Benz, Paul Schulze, Matthew Marsden, Graham McTavish, Tim Kang, Rey Gallegos, Jake La Botz, Ken Howard, Supakorn Kitsuwon, Maung Maung Khin, Aung Aay Noi, Sornram Patchimtasanakarn	
J A N U A R Y	25	Untraceable	Screen Gems / Lakeshore Entertainment	Gregory Hoblit (director); Robert Fyvolent, Mark Brinker, Allison Burnett (screenplay); Diane Lane, Colin Hanks, Billy Burke, Joseph Cross, Mary Beth Hurt, Tyrone Giordano, Perla Haney-Jardine, Christopher Cousins, Tim De Zarn, Jesse Tyler Ferguson, Dax Jordan, Peter Lewis, John Breen, Brynn Baron, Phil Hamilton	
F E B R U A R Y	1	The Eye	Lionsgate / Paramount Vantage / Cruise/Wagner Productions	David Moreau, Xavier Palud (directors); Sebastian Gutiérrez (screenplay); Jessica Alba, Parker Posey, Alessandro Nivola, Rade Šerbedžija, Obba Babatundé, Tamlyn Tomita, Fernanda Romero, Rachel Ticotin, Chloë Grace Moretz, Danny Mora	
F E B R U A R Y	1	Hannah Montana and Miley Cyrus: Best of Both Worlds Concert	Walt Disney Pictures	Bruce Hendricks (director); Miley Cyrus, Candice Accola, Jonas Brothers, Kenny Ortega, Billy Ray Cyrus	
F E B R U A R Y	1	Over Her Dead Body	New Line Cinema / Gold Circle Films	Jeff Lowell (director/screenplay); Eva Longoria Parker, Paul Rudd, Lake Bell, Jason Biggs, Lindsay Sloane, Ali Hillis, Stephen Root, W. Morgan Sheppard, Wendi McLendon-Covey, Deborah Theaker, Jack Conley, Colin Fickes, Misha Collins, Sam Pancake, Owen Wilson	
F E B R U A R Y	1	Strange Wilderness	Paramount Pictures / Level 1 Entertainment / Happy Madison Productions	Fred Wolf (director/screenplay); Peter Gaulke (screenplay); Steve Zahn, Allen Covert, Jonah Hill, Robert Patrick, Justin Long, Jeff Garlin, Ernest Borgnine, Ashley Scott, Harry Hamlin, Kevin Heffernan, John P. Farley, Peter Dante, Oliver Hudson, Blake Clark, Seth Rogen	
F E B R U A R Y	5	Snow Buddies	Walt Disney Studios Home Entertainment / Keystone Entertainment / Key Pix Productions	Robert Vince (director/screenplay); Anna McRoberts (screenplay); Dominic Scott Kay, John Kapelos, Lise Simms, Mike Dopud, Dylan Minnette, Richard Karn, Cynthia Stevenson, Kris Kristofferson, Josh Flitter, Henry Hodges, Liliana Mumy, Jimmy Bennett, Skyler Gisondo, Whoopi Goldberg, Tom Everett Scott, Molly Shannon, Dylan Sprouse, Lothaire Bluteau, Paul Rae, Jim Belushi, Gig Morton, Cainan Wiebe, Charles C. Stevenson Jr., Christian Pikes, Tyler Foden, Jarvis Dashkewytch, Kelly Chapek, Michael Teigen	
F E B R U A R Y	6	How to Rob a Bank	IFC First Take	Andrews Jenkins (director/screenplay); Nick Stahl, Erika Christensen, Gavin Rossdale, Terry Crews, Adriano Aragon, David Carradine, Leo Fitzpatrick	
F E B R U A R Y	8	Fool's Gold	Warner Bros. Pictures	Andy Tennant (director/screenplay); John Claflin, Daniel Zelman (screenplay); Kate Hudson, Matthew McConaughey, Donald Sutherland, Ewen Bremner, Alexis Dziena, Kevin Hart, Ray Winstone, Tiffany Grant, Brian Hooks, Malcolm-Jamal Warner, Michael Mulheren, Adam LeFevre, Rohan Nichol, David Roberts, Roger Sciberras, Dan Mewing	
F E B R U A R Y	8	In Bruges	Focus Features	Martin McDonagh (director/screenplay); Colin Farrell, Brendan Gleeson, Ralph Fiennes, Clémence Poésy, Jérémie Renier, Jordan Prentice, Thekla Reuten, Anna Madeley, Elizabeth Berrington, Eric Godon, Željko Ivanek, Ciarán Hinds, Matt Smith	
F E B R U A R Y	8	Welcome Home Roscoe Jenkins	Universal Pictures / Spyglass Entertainment	Malcolm D. Lee (director/screenplay); Martin Lawrence, Margaret Avery, Joy Bryant, Louis C.K., Michael Clarke Duncan, Mike Epps, Mo'Nique, Nicole Ari Parker, Cedric the Entertainer, James Earl Jones, Brooke Lyons, Affion Crockett, Liz Mikel	
F E B R U A R Y	8	Wild West Comedy Show: 30 Days and 30 Nights – Hollywood to the Heartland	Picturehouse Entertainment	Ari Sandel (director); Ahmed Ahmed, Sean Fitzgerald, Peter Billingsley, John Caparulo, Bret Ernst, Justin Long, Sebastian Maniscalco, Keir O'Donnell, Vince Vaughn	
F E B R U A R Y	9	Bernard and Doris	HBO Films	Bob Balaban (director); Hugh Costello (screenplay); Susan Sarandon, Ralph Fiennes, Peter Asher, Don Harvey, Chris Bauer, Monique Gabriela Curnen, James Rebhorn, Dominick Dunne, Calvin Trillin, Neal Huff, Jim Bracchitta, Bruce MacVittie	
F E B R U A R Y	11	Sita Sings the Blues	GKIDS	Nina Paley (director); Sanjiv Jhaveri, Nina Paley, Deepti Gupta, Debargo Sanyal, Reena Shah, Pooja Kumar, Aladdin Ullah	
F E B R U A R Y	12	2012: Doomsday	The Asylum	Nick Everhart (director/screenplay); Cliff DeYoung, Dale Midkiff, Ami Dolenz, Danae Nason, Joshua Lee, Sara Tomko, Caroline Amiguet	
F E B R U A R Y	14	Definitely, Maybe	Universal Pictures / Working Title Films	Adam Brooks (director/screenplay); Ryan Reynolds, Isla Fisher, Derek Luke, Abigail Breslin, Elizabeth Banks, Rachel Weisz, Kevin Kline, Adam Ferrara, Annie Parisse, Liane Balaban, Nestor Serrano, Marc Bonan, Alexie Gilmore, Kevin Corrigan	
F E B R U A R Y	14	Jumper	20th Century Fox / Regency Enterprises	Doug Liman (director); David S. Goyer, Jim Uhls, Simon Kinberg (screenplay); Hayden Christensen, Samuel L. Jackson, Rachel Bilson, Jamie Bell, Diane Lane, Michael Rooker, Jesse James, Tom Hulce, Kristen Stewart, Teddy Dunn, AnnaSophia Robb, Max Thieriot, Barbara Garrick, Shawn Roberts, Meredith Henderson, Nathalie Cox, Tony Nappo, Clark Beasley Jr.	
F E B R U A R Y	14	The Spiderwick Chronicles	Paramount Pictures / Nickelodeon Movies / The Kennedy/Marshall Company / Atmosphere Pictures	Mark Waters (director); Karey Kirkpatrick, David Berenbaum, John Sayles (screenplay); Freddie Highmore, Sarah Bolger, Mary-Louise Parker, Martin Short, Nick Nolte, Seth Rogen, Joan Plowright, David Strathairn, Ron Perlman, Andrew McCarthy, Tod Fennell, Lise Durocher-Viens	
F E B R U A R Y	14	Step Up 2: The Streets	Touchstone Pictures / Summit Entertainment	Jon M. Chu (director); Toni Ann Johnson, Karen Barna (screenplay); Briana Evigan, Robert Hoffman, Adam Sevani, Will Kemp, Cassie Ventura, Harry Shum, Jr., Sonja Sohn, Telisha Shaw, Danielle Polanco, Channing Tatum, Christopher Scott, Janelle Cambridge, LaJon Dantzler, Luis Rosado, Mari Koda, Janelle Cambridge, LaJon Dantzler, Luis Rosado, Mari Koda, Rockstar Logu, BooG!e	
F E B R U A R Y	15	Diary of the Dead	The Weinstein Company / Dimension Films	George A. Romero (director/screenplay); Michelle Morgan, Josh Close, Shawn Roberts, Amy Lalonde, Joe Dinicol, Scott Wentworth, Philip Riccio, Chris Violette, Tatiana Maslany, R.D. Reid, Megan Park, Alan van Sprang, Boyd Banks, George Buza, Tino Monte, Martin Roach, Matt Birman, Laura DeCarteret, Janet Lo, Rebuka Hoye, Todd William Schroeder, Alexandria DeFabiis, Nick Alachiotis, George A. Romero, Gregory Nicotero, Quentin Tarantino, Wes Craven, Guillermo del Toro, Simon Pegg, Stephen King	
F E B R U A R Y	22	Be Kind Rewind	New Line Cinema / Partizan Films	Michel Gondry (director/screenplay); Jack Black, Mos Def, Danny Glover, Mia Farrow, Melonie Diaz, Arjay Smith, Quinton Aaron, Chandler Parker, Karolina Wydra, P.J. Byrne, Matt Walsh, Paul Dinello, Sigourney Weaver, Gio Perez, Marcus Carl Franklin, Irv Gooch, Blake Hightower, Amir Ali Said, Marc Alan Austen, Kid Creole, Jon Glaser, Marceline Hugot, John Tormey, Booker T. Jones, Steve Cropper, Donald "Duck" Dunn, Jimmy Scott, McCoy Tyner, Alan Ferraro, Marco Quevedo	
F E B R U A R Y	22	Charlie Bartlett	Metro-Goldwyn-Mayer / Sidney Kimmel Entertainment	Jon Poll (director); Gustin Nash (screenplay); Anton Yelchin, Hope Davis, Kat Dennings, Robert Downey Jr., Tyler Hilton, Mark Rendall, Jake Epstein, Megan Park, Lauren Collins, Derek McGrath, Stephen Young, Abby Zotz, Drake, Sarah Gadon, Ishan Davé	
F E B R U A R Y	22	Sex and Death 101	Anchor Bay Entertainment	Daniel Waters (director/screenplay); Simon Baker, Winona Ryder, Leslie Bibb, Mindy Cohn, Julie Bowen, Dash Mihok, Neil Flynn, Robert Ray Wisdom, Tanc Sade, Patton Oswalt, Frances Fisher, Sophie Monk, Marshall Bell, Natassia Malthe, Pollyanna McIntosh, Rob Benedict, Jessica Kiper, Winter Ave Zoli, Cindy Pickett, Nicole Bilderback, Keram Malicki-Sánchez, Retta, Corinne Reilly, Amanda Walsh, Zachary Gordon, Indira Varma	
F E B R U A R Y	22	U2 3D	National Geographic Entertainment / 3ality Digital	Catherine Owens, Mark Pellington (directors); Bono, The Edge, Adam Clayton, Larry Mullen Jr.	
F E B R U A R Y	22	Vantage Point	Columbia Pictures / Relativity Media / Original Film	Pete Travis (director); Barry L. Levy (screenplay); Dennis Quaid, Matthew Fox, Forest Whitaker, Sigourney Weaver, William Hurt, Saïd Taghmaoui, Édgar Ramírez, Ayelet Zurer, Eduardo Noriega, Richard T. Jones, Bruce McGill, Zoe Saldaña, Holt McCallany, Leonardo Nam, James LeGros	
F E B R U A R Y	22	Witless Protection	Lionsgate / Parallel Entertainment	Charles Robert Carner (director/screenplay); Larry the Cable Guy, Jenny McCarthy, Ivana Miličević, Joe Mantegna, Lisa Lampanelli, Yaphet Kotto, Richard Bull, Eric Roberts, Peter Stormare, J. David Moeller, Sean Bridgers	
F E B R U A R Y	29	Bonneville	SenArt Films	Jessica Lange, Kathy Bates, Joan Allen, Tom Skerritt, Christine Baranski	
F E B R U A R Y	29	Chicago 10	Roadside Attractions / Participant Productions / River Road Entertainment / Curious Pictures / Consolidated Documentaries	Brett Morgen (director/screenplay); Hank Azaria, Dylan Baker, Nick Nolte, Mark Ruffalo, Roy Scheider, Liev Schreiber, James Urbaniak, Jeffrey Wright, Reg Rogers, Ebon Moss-Bachrach, Debra Eisenstadt, Lloyd Floyd, Leonard Weinglass, Catherine Curtin, Dave Boat, Roger L. Jackson, Amy Ryan, Daniel Hagen, Chris Murney, Julián Rebolledo, Abbie Hoffman, David Dellinger, William Kunstler, Jerry Rubin, Bobby Seale, Tom Hayden, Walter Cronkite, Richard M. Daley, Rennie Davis, John Froines, Allen Ginsberg, Lyndon B. Johnson, Paul Krassner, Ed Sanders, Lee Weiner, Ted Marcoux, Chuck Montgomery, Phillip Piro, Jay Potter, John Rubano	
F E B R U A R Y	29	City of Men	Miramax Films	Douglas Silva, Darlan Cunha, Jonathan Haagensen, Rodrigo dos Santos	
F E B R U A R Y	29	The Other Boleyn Girl	Columbia Pictures / BBC Film / Relativity Media	Justin Chadwick (director); Peter Morgan (screenplay); Natalie Portman, Scarlett Johansson, Eric Bana, Jim Sturgess, Kristin Scott Thomas, Mark Rylance, David Morrissey, Benedict Cumberbatch, Oliver Coleman, Ana Torrent, Eddie Redmayne, Juno Temple, Iain Mitchell, Andrew Garfield, Corinne Galloway, Constance Stride, Maisie Smith, Alfie Allen	
F E B R U A R Y	29	Penelope	Summit Entertainment / Stone Village Pictures / Type A Films	Mark Palansky (director); Leslie Caveny (screenplay); Christina Ricci, James McAvoy, Catherine O'Hara, Reese Witherspoon, Richard E. Grant, Peter Dinklage, Russell Brand, Nick Frost, Ronni Ancona, Simon Woods, Nigel Havers, Burn Gorman, John Voce, Lenny Henry, Richard Leaf, Michael Feast	
F E B R U A R Y	29	Semi-Pro	New Line Cinema	Kent Alterman (director); Scot Armstrong (screenplay); Will Ferrell, Woody Harrelson, Andre Benjamin, Maura Tierney, Andrew Daly, Will Arnett, Andy Richter, David Koechner, Rob Corddry, Matt Walsh, Jackie Earle Haley, DeRay Davis, Josh Braaten, Jay Phillips, Peter Cornell, Patti LaBelle, Tim Meadows, Jason Sudeikis, Kristen Wiig, Ellia English, Ed Helms, Brian Huskey, Artis Gilmore, George Gervin, Jerry Minor	
M A R C H	4	Dr. Dolittle: Tail to the Chief	20th Century Fox Home Entertainment / Davis Entertainment	Craig Shapiro (director); Matt Lieberman, Kathleen Laccinole (screenplay); Kyla Pratt, Peter Coyote, Niall Matter, Elise Gatien, Malcolm Stewart, Christine Chatelain, Christopher Gaze, Jason Griffith, Norm Macdonald, Jennifer Coolidge, Ben Diskin, Greg Ellis, Richard Kind, Nolan North, Phil Proctor, Karen Holness, Kwesi Ameyaw, Stephanie Belding, Maggie Marson, Diana Yanez	
M A R C H	7	10,000 BC	Warner Bros. Pictures / Legendary Pictures / Centropolis Entertainment	Roland Emmerich (director/screenplay); Harald Kloser (screenplay); Steven Strait, Camilla Belle, Cliff Curtis, Affif Ben Badra, Marco Khan, Tim Barlow, Joel Fry, Mona Hammond, Reece Ritchie, Omar Sharif, Joel Virgel, Nathanael Baring, Mo Zinal, Junior Oliphant, Kristian Beazley, Boubacar Badaine, Farouk Valley-Omar, Piers Stubbs	
M A R C H	7	The Bank Job	Lionsgate / Mosaic Media Group / Relativity Media / Omnilab Media	Roger Donaldson (director); Dick Clement, Ian La Frenais (screenplay); Jason Statham, Saffron Burrows, Richard Lintern, Keeley Hawes, Stephen Campbell Moore, Michael Jibson, Georgia Taylor, Daniel Mays, David Suchet, Peter de Jersey, Gerard Horan, Don Gallagher, Craig Fairbrass, Peter Bowles, James Faulkner, Alki David, Colin Salmon, Hattie Morahan, Robert Whitelock, Julian Lewis Jones, Andrew Brooke, Sharon Maughan, Alistair Petrie, Rupert Frazer, Christopher Owen, Angus Wright, Rupert Vansittart, Taylor Samways, Kasey Baterip, Trevor Coppola, Bronson Webb, Julian Firth, Mick Jagger	
M A R C H	7	College Road Trip	Walt Disney Pictures	Roger Kumble (director); Emi Mochizuki, Carrie Evans, Cinco Paul, Ken Daurio (screenplay); Martin Lawrence, Raven-Symoné, Donny Osmond, Molly Ephraim, Kym Whitley, Brenda Song, Margo Harshman, Arnetia Walker, Vincent Pastore, Lucas Grabeel, Will Sasso, Geneva Carr, Josh Meyers, Michael Landes, Joseph R. Gannascoli, Kelly Coffield Park, Julia Frisoli, Eshaya Draper, Benjamin Patterson, Kristian Kordula, Brianna Shea Russo	
M A R C H	7	Married Life	Sony Pictures Classics / Sidney Kimmel Entertainment	Ira Sachs (director/screenplay); Oren Moverman (screenplay); Pierce Brosnan, Chris Cooper, Patricia Clarkson, Rachel McAdams, David Wenham	
M A R C H	7	Miss Pettigrew Lives for a Day	Focus Features	Bharat Nalluri (director); David Magee, Simon Beaufoy (screenplay); Frances McDormand, Amy Adams, Ciarán Hinds, Lee Pace, Tom Payne, Mark Strong, Shirley Henderson, Christina Cole, Stephanie Cole	
M A R C H	7	Paranoid Park	IFC Films	Gus Van Sant (director/screenplay); Gabe Nevins, Taylor Momsen, Jake Miller, Daniel Liu, Lauren McKinney, Scott Patrick Green	
M A R C H	7	Snow Angels	Warner Independent Pictures	David Gordon Green (director/screenplay); Kate Beckinsale, Sam Rockwell, Michael Angarano, Jeanetta Arnette, Griffin Dunne, Nicky Katt, Tom Noonan, Connor Paolo, Amy Sedaris, Olivia Thirlby, Grace Hudson	
M A R C H	14	Doomsday	Rogue Pictures / Intrepid Pictures / Crystal Sky Pictures	Neil Marshall (director/screenplay); Rhona Mitra, Bob Hoskins, Malcolm McDowell, Alexander Siddig, David O'Hara, Craig Conway, Lee-Anne Liebenberg, Hennie Bosman, Adrian Lester, Chris Robson, Sean Pertwee, Darren Morfitt, MyAnna Buring, Emma Cleasby, Neil Marshall	
M A R C H	14	Dr. Seuss' Horton Hears a Who!	20th Century Fox / Blue Sky Studios	Jimmy Hayward, Steve Martino (directors); Cinco Paul, Ken Daurio (screenplay); Jim Carrey, Steve Carell, Carol Burnett, Will Arnett, Seth Rogen, Selena Gomez, Dan Fogler, Isla Fisher, Jonah Hill, Amy Poehler, Jaime Pressly, Jesse McCartney, Josh Flitter, Niecy Nash, Charles Osgood, Jack Angel, Jan Rabson, John Cygan, Jess Harnell, Debi Derryberry, Karen Disher, Marshall Efron, Bill Farmer, Heather Goldenhersh, Jimmy Hayward, Joey King, Laraine Newman, Colleen O'Shaughnessey, Joe Pasquale, Isabella Acres, Bob Bergen, Jeff Biancalana, Madison Davenport, Teresa Ganzel, Sherry Lynn, Danny Mann, Mona Marshall, Mickie McGowan, Madison Pettis, Grace Rolek, Ariel Winter, Kresimir Mikic	
M A R C H	14	Funny Games	Warner Independent Pictures	Michael Haneke (director/screenplay); Naomi Watts, Tim Roth, Michael Pitt, Brady Corbet, Devon Gearhart, Boyd Gaines, Siobhan Fallon Hogan, Robert LuPone, Susanne Haneke, Linda Moran	
M A R C H	14	Never Back Down	Summit Entertainment / Mandalay Independent Productions	Jeff Wadlow (director); Chris Hauty (screenplay); Sean Faris, Amber Heard, Cam Gigandet, Evan Peters, Leslie Hope, Djimon Hounsou, Tilky Jones, Zach Myers, Neil Brown Jr., Wyatt Smith, Chele Andre, Lauren Leech	
M A R C H	14	Sleepwalking	Overture Films	William Maher (director); Zac Stanford (screenplay); AnnaSophia Robb, Nick Stahl, Charlize Theron, Dennis Hopper, Woody Harrelson, Deborra-Lee Furness, Mathew St. Patrick	
M A R C H	19	Under the Same Moon	Fox Searchlight Pictures / The Weinstein Company	Patricia Riggen (director); Ligiah Villalobos (screenplay); Adrián Alonso, Kate del Castillo, Eugenio Derbez, America Ferrera, Jesse Garcia, Maya Zapata, Gabriel Porras, Sonya Smith, Carmen Salinas, Ernesto D'Alessio, Los Tigres del Norte	
M A R C H	21	Drillbit Taylor	Paramount Pictures	Steven Brill (director); Kristofor Brown, Seth Rogen (screenplay); Owen Wilson, Nate Hartley, Troy Gentile, David Dorfman, Alex Frost, Josh Peck, Leslie Mann, Danny McBride, Stephen Root, Ian Roberts, Lisa Lampanelli, Lisa Ann Walter, Hynden Walch, Valerie Tian, David Bowe, Beth Littleford, Steve Bannos, Chuck Liddell, Robert Allen Mukes, Cedric Yarbrough, Tichina Arnold, Kevin Hart, Matt Besser, Shaun Weiss, Steven Brill, Mary-Pat Green, Jareb Dauplaise, Adam Baldwin	
M A R C H	21	The Grand	Anchor Bay Entertainment	Zak Penn (director/screenplay); Matt Bierman (screenplay); Woody Harrelson, David Cross, Dennis Farina, Cheryl Hines, Richard Kind, Chris Parnell, Werner Herzog, Ray Romano, Barry Corbin, Michael McKean, Gabe Kaplan, Andrea Savage, Estelle Harris, Judy Greer, Jason Alexander, Brett Ratner, Hank Azaria, Tom Hodges, Shannon Elizabeth, K.D. Aubert, Mike Epps, Jeff Bowler, Tommy "Tiny" Lister Jr., Phil Gordon, Doyle Brunson, Daniel Negreanu, Phil Laak, Phil Hellmuth, Antonio Esfandiari, Richard Brodie, Michael Karnow, David Pressman	
M A R C H	21	Meet the Browns	Lionsgate / Tyler Perry Studios	Tyler Perry (director/screenplay); Angela Bassett, Jenifer Lewis, David Mann, Tyler Perry, Rick Fox, Lance Gross, Tamela Mann, Lamman Rucker, Sofia Vergara, Frankie Faison, Margaret Avery, Irma P. Hall, LaVan Davis, Chloe Bailey, Phillip Van Lear, Kristopher Lofton, Mariana Tolbert, Brandon Richardson	
M A R C H	21	Shutter	20th Century Fox / Regency Enterprises	Masayuki Ochiai (director); Luke Dawson (screenplay); Joshua Jackson, Rachael Taylor, Megumi Okina, John Hensley, David Denman, James Kyson Lee, Daisy Betts, Maya Hazen, Yoshiko Miyazaki	
M A R C H	28	21	Columbia Pictures / Relativity Media	Robert Luketic (director); Peter Steinfeld, Allan Loeb (screenplay); Jim Sturgess, Kate Bosworth, Laurence Fishburne, Kevin Spacey, Liza Lapira, Aaron Yoo, Jacob Pitts, Jack McGee, Josh Gad, Sam Golzari, Helen Carey, Jack Gilpin	
M A R C H	28	Chapter 27	Peace Arch Entertainment	Jarrett Schaefer (director/screenplay); Jared Leto, Judah Friedlander, Lindsay Lohan	
M A R C H	28	Flawless	Magnolia Pictures	Michael Radford (director); Edward Anderson (screenplay); Demi Moore, Michael Caine, Lambert Wilson, Joss Ackland, Constantine Gregory, Natalie Dormer, Nathaniel Parker, Nicholas Jones, Derren Nesbitt, Rosalind March, Stanley Townsend, Jonathan Aris, Simon Day, Yemi Goodman Ajibade, Kate Maravan, Ahmed Ayman	
M A R C H	28	Run Fatboy Run	Picturehouse / Material Entertainment	David Schwimmer (director); Michael Ian Black, Simon Pegg (screenplay); Simon Pegg, Thandie Newton, Hank Azaria, Dylan Moran, Harish Patel, India de Beaufort, Matthew Fenton, Simon Day, Ruth Sheen, Tyrone Huggins, Nevan Finegan, Iddo Goldberg, Floella Benjamin, Chris Hollins, Denise Lewis, Peter Serafinowicz, Stephen Merchant, David Walliams, Michael Johnson, Bill Bailey, Margaret John	
M A R C H	28	Stop-Loss	Paramount Pictures / MTV Films	Kimberly Peirce (director/screenplay); Mark Richard (screenplay); Ryan Phillippe, Channing Tatum, Abbie Cornish, Joseph Gordon-Levitt, Rob Brown, Victor Rasuk, Timothy Olyphant, Josef Sommer, Linda Emond, Ciarán Hinds, Mamie Gummer, Alex Frost, Steven Strait, Terry Quay, Matthew Scott Wilcox, Connett Brewer, Chandra Washington, Cora Cardona	
M A R C H	28	Superhero Movie	Metro-Goldwyn-Mayer / Dimension Films	Craig Mazin (director/screenplay); Drake Bell, Sara Paxton, Christopher McDonald, Kevin Hart, Brent Spiner, Jeffrey Tambor, Robert Joy, Regina Hall, Pamela Anderson, Leslie Nielsen, Marion Ross, Ryan Hansen, Tracy Morgan, Robert Hays, Nicole Sullivan, Simon Rex, Craig Bierko, Aki Aleong, Miles Fisher, John Getz, Dan Castellaneta, Keith David, Charlene Tilton, Kurt Fuller, Kimberly "Lil' Kim" Jones, Marque Richardson, Vincent LaRusso, Michael Papajohn, Jenica Bergere, Byrne Offutt, Vic Polizos, Kent Shocknek, Craig Mazin, Jonathan Chase, Steve Monroe, Nick Kiriazis, Ajay Mehta, James Lew, Thomas Rosales Jr., Marisa Lauren, Richard Tillman, Howard Mungo, Sean Simms, Freddie Pierce, David McKnight, Cameron Ali Sims, Ian Patrick Williams	

== April–June ==
Opening		Title	Production company	Cast and crew	Ref.
A P R I L	4	Leatherheads	Universal Pictures / Smokehouse Pictures / Casey Silver Productions	George Clooney (director); Duncan Brantley, Rick Reilly (screenplay); George Clooney, Renée Zellweger, John Krasinski, Jonathan Pryce, Stephen Root, Wayne Duvall, Keith Loneker, Malcolm Goodwin, Tim Griffin, Robert Baker, Jeremy Ratchford, Max Casella, Jack Thompson, Blake Clark, Marian Seldes, Ledisi Young, Thomas Francis Murphy, Matt Bushell, Nick Paones, Nick Bourdages, Bill Roberson	
A P R I L	4	Meet Bill	First Look International	Bernie Goldmann (director); Melisa Wallack (director/screenplay); Aaron Eckhart, Jessica Alba, Elizabeth Banks, Timothy Olyphant, Logan Lerman, Todd Louiso, Craig Bierko, Reed Diamond, Kristen Wiig, Jason Sudeikis, Gabriel Basso, Holmes Osborne, Andy Zou, Ana Mackenzie	
A P R I L	4	My Blueberry Nights	The Weinstein Company	Wong Kar-Wai (director/screenplay); Lawrence Block (screenplay); Norah Jones, Jude Law, David Strathairn, Rachel Weisz, Natalie Portman, Chan Marshall, Frankie Faison, Adriane Lenox, Benjamin Kanes, Michael Hartnett, Michael May, Chad Davis, Katya Blumenberg, John Malloy, Demetrius Butler	
A P R I L	4	Nim's Island	20th Century Fox / Walden Media	Jennifer Flackett, Mark Levin (directors/screenplay); Joseph Kwong, Paula Mazur (screenplay); Abigail Breslin, Jodie Foster, Gerard Butler, Anthony Simcoe, Alphonso McAuley, Morgan Griffin, Michael Carman, Christopher Baker, Maddison Joyce, Peter Callan	
A P R I L	4	The Ruins	DreamWorks Pictures / Spyglass Entertainment / Red Hour Films	Carter Smith (director); Scott B. Smith (screenplay); Jonathan Tucker, Jena Malone, Shawn Ashmore, Laura Ramsey, Joe Anderson, Dimitri Baveas, Jesse Ramirez, Jordan Patrick Smith, Bar Paly, Karen Strassman, Sergio Calderon	
A P R I L	4	Shine a Light	Paramount Classics / Shangri-La Entertainment	Martin Scorsese (director); Mick Jagger, Keith Richards, Charlie Watts, Ronnie Wood	
A P R I L	11	Never Forever	Arts Alliance America	Gina Kim (director/screenplay); Vera Farmiga, Ha Jung-woo, David Lee McInnis, Jackson Pace, Alex Manette, Shirley Roeca, Marceline Hugot	
A P R I L	11	Prom Night	Screen Gems / Original Film / Newmarket Films	Nelson McCormick (director); J.S. Cardone (screenplay); Brittany Snow, Scott Porter, Jessica Stroup, Dana Davis, Collins Pennie, Kelly Blatz, James Ransone, Brianne Davis, Johnathon Schaech, Idris Elba, Jessalyn Gilsig, Linden Ashby, Kellan Lutz, Mary Mara, Ming-Na Wen, Jana Kramer, Rachel Specter, Valeri Ross, Lori Heuring, Nicholas James, Joshua Leonard	
A P R I L	11	Smart People	Miramax Films / Groundswell Entertainment	Noam Murro (director); Mark Poirier (screenplay); Dennis Quaid, Sarah Jessica Parker, Elliot Page, Thomas Haden Church, Ashton Holmes, Christine Lahti, Camille Mana, David Denman, Scott A. Martin, Don Wadsworth, Richard John Walters	
A P R I L	11	Street Kings	Fox Searchlight Pictures / Regency Enterprises	David Ayer (director); James Ellroy, Kurt Wimmer, Jamie Moss (screenplay); Keanu Reeves, Forest Whitaker, Hugh Laurie, Chris Evans, Common, The Game, Naomie Harris, John Corbett, Cedric the Entertainer, Jay Mohr, Terry Crews, Cle Shaheed Sloan, Martha Higareda, Amaury Nolasco, Clifton Powell, Noel G.	
A P R I L	11	The Visitor	Overture Films / Groundswell Entertainment / Participant Productions	Tom McCarthy (director/screenplay); Richard Jenkins, Haaz Sleiman, Danai Gurira, Hiam Abbass, Richard Kind, Michael Cumpsty, Marian Seldes	
A P R I L	18	Anamorph	IFC Films	Henry S. Miller (director/screenplay); Tom Phelan (screenplay); Willem Dafoe, Scott Speedman, Peter Stormare, Clea Duvall, James Rebhorn, Mick Foley, Yul Vazquez, Amy Carlson, Don Harvey, Paul Lazar, Edward Hibbert, Deborah Harry, Amir Arison	
A P R I L	18	Expelled: No Intelligence Allowed	Rocky Mountain Pictures	Nathan Frankowski (director); Ben Stein	
A P R I L	18	The Forbidden Kingdom	Lionsgate / The Weinstein Company / Casey Silver Productions / Relativity Media	Rob Minkoff (director); John Fusco (screenplay); Jackie Chan, Jet Li, Michael Angarano, Collin Chou, Liu Yi Fei, Li Bingbing, Deshun Wang	
A P R I L	18	Forgetting Sarah Marshall	Universal Pictures	Nicholas Stoller (director); Jason Segel (screenplay); Jason Segel, Kristen Bell, Mila Kunis, Russell Brand, Bill Hader, Jonah Hill, Liz Cackowski, Da'Vone McDonald, Jack McBrayer, Maria Thayer, Paul Rudd, Jason Bateman, William Baldwin, Teila Tuli, Branscombe Richmond, Kristen Wiig, Tim Blaney, Julianne Buescher, Kevin Carlson, Leslie Carrara-Rudolph, Scott Land, Drew Massey, Michelan Sisti, Victor Yerrid	
A P R I L	18	The Life Before Her Eyes	Magnolia Pictures	Vadim Perelman (director); Emil Stern (screenplay); Uma Thurman, Evan Rachel Wood, Eva Amurri, Brett Cullen, Gabrielle Brennan, Adam Chanler-Berat, Oscar Isaac, Maggie Lacey, Jewel Donohue, Tanner Max Cohen, Lynn Cohen, John Magaro, Molly Price, Isabel Keating, Nathalie Paulding, Mike Slater	
A P R I L	18	Where in the World Is Osama bin Laden?	The Weinstein Company	Morgan Spurlock (director/screenplay); Jeremy Chilnick (screenplay); Morgan Spurlock	
A P R I L	18	Zombie Strippers	Stage 6 Films / Triumph Films	Jay Lee (director/screenplay); Robert Englund, Jenna Jameson, Roxy Saint, Penny Drake, Jennifer Holland, Brad Milne, Tito Ortiz, Kaiji Tang, Joey Medina, Whitney Anderson, Shamron Moore, Jeannette Sousa, Carmit Levine, Johnny D. Hawkes, Zak Kilberg, Jen Alex Gonzalez, Asante Jones, Calvin Green, Catero Colbert, Billy Beck, Jessica Custodio	
A P R I L	25	Baby Mama	Universal Pictures / Relativity Media	Michael McCullers (director/screenplay); Tina Fey, Amy Poehler, Greg Kinnear, Dax Shepard, Romany Malco, Maura Tierney, Holland Taylor, Steve Martin, Sigourney Weaver, Stephen Mailer, Siobhan Fallon Hogan, Kevin Collins, Will Forte, Denis O'Hare, Fred Armisen, James Rebhorn, John Hodgman, Tom McCarthy, Jason Mantzoukas, Dave Finkel, Brian Stack	
A P R I L	25	Deal	Metro-Goldwyn-Mayer	Gil Cates Jr. (director/screenplay); Mark Weinstock (screenplay); Bret Harrison, Burt Reynolds, Charles Durning, Jennifer Tilly, Shannon Elizabeth, Gary Grubbs, J.D. Evermore, Billy Slaughter, Courtney Friel, Phil Laak, Antonio Esfandiari, Vincent Van Patten, Chris Moneymaker, Greg Raymer, Isabelle Mercier, Mike Sexton, Maria Mason, Caroline McKinley, Brandon Olive, Jon Eyez, Scott Lazar	
A P R I L	25	Deception	20th Century Fox	Marcel Langenegger (director); Mark Bomback (screenplay); Hugh Jackman, Ewan McGregor, Michelle Williams, Charlotte Rampling, Lisa Gay Hamilton, Maggie Q, Natasha Henstridge, Lynn Cohen, Danny Burstein, Malcolm Goodwin	
A P R I L	25	Harold & Kumar Escape from Guantanamo Bay	New Line Cinema / Mandate Pictures	Jon Hurwitz, Hayden Schlossberg (directors/screenplay); Kal Penn, John Cho, Danneel Harris, Rob Corddry, Roger Bart, Eric Winter, Neil Patrick Harris, Paula Garcés, Amir Talai, David Krumholtz, Eddie Kaye Thomas, Christopher Meloni, Richard Christy, Clyde Kusatsu, Beverly D'Angelo, Jon Reep, Ed Helms, Jack Conley, Tamara Feldman, James Adomian, Missi Pyle, Alec Rayme, Juli Erickson, Lester "Rasta" Speight, Carsten Lorenz, Angus Sutherland, Jon Hurwitz, Hayden Schlossberg, Bill Stinchcomb, Adam Herschman, Ava Santana, Randal Reeder, Frank Lee, Echo Valley, Wilbur Fitzgerald, Jason Konopisos	
A P R I L	25	Then She Found Me	ThinkFilm	Helen Hunt (director/screenplay); Alice Arlen, Victor Levin (screenplay); Helen Hunt, Bette Midler, Colin Firth, Matthew Broderick, Ben Shenkman, Salman Rushdie, John Benjamin Hickey, Lynn Cohen, Maggie Siff, Tommy Nelson, Janeane Garofalo, Tim Robbins	
A P R I L	25	Standard Operating Procedure	Sony Pictures Classics / Participant Media	Errol Morris (director/screenplay); Janis Karpinski, Sabrina Harman, Lynndie England, Javal Davis, Megan Ambuhl Graner, Jeremy Sivits, Alim Kouliev, Tim Dugan, Brent Pack, Ken Davis, Tony Diaz, Jeffrey Frost, Roman Krol, Christopher Bradley, Sarah Denning, Joshua Feinman	
A P R I L	30	Mister Lonely	IFC Films	Harmony Korine (director/screenplay); Avi Korine (screenplay); Diego Luna, Samantha Morton, Denis Lavant, Werner Herzog, James Fox, Anita Pallenberg, Melita Morgan, Jason Pennycooke, Esmé Creed-Miles, Leos Carax, Quentin Grosset, Rachel Korine, Joseph Morgan, Richard Strange, Daniel Rovai, Mal Whiteley, Nigel Cooper, Michael-Joel Stuart, David Blaine, Angel Morgan	
M A Y	2	Iron Man	Paramount Pictures / Marvel Studios	Jon Favreau (director); Mark Fergus, Hawk Ostby, Art Marcum, Matt Holloway (screenplay); Robert Downey Jr., Terrence Howard, Jeff Bridges, Shaun Toub, Gwyneth Paltrow, Leslie Bibb, Faran Tahir, Paul Bettany, Clark Gregg, Will Lyman, Jon Favreau, Samuel L. Jackson, Stan Lee, Peter Billingsley, Tom Morello, Jim Cramer, Bill Smitrovich, Sayed Badreya, Tim Guinee, Marco Khan, Ahmed Ahmed, Fahim Fazli, Russell Richardson, Nazanin Boniadi, Patrick O'Connell, Adam Harrington, Meera Simhan, Ricki Noel Lander, Masha Lund, Gabrielle Tuite, Tim Griffin, Joshua Harto, Micah Hauptman, America Olivo	
M A Y	2	Made of Honor	Columbia Pictures / Relativity Media / Original Film	Paul Weiland (director); Adam Sztykiel, Deborah Kaplan, Harry Elfont (screenplay); Patrick Dempsey, Michelle Monaghan, Kevin McKidd, Kathleen Quinlan, Sydney Pollack, Chris Messina, Kadeem Hardison, Richmond Arquette, Busy Philipps, Whitney Cummings, Sarah Wright, Emily Nelson, James B. Sikking, Kevin Sussman, Beau Garrett, Kelly Carlson, Valerie Edmond, Hannah Gordon, Eoin McCarthy, Clive Russell, Mary Birdsong, Murray McArthur	
M A Y	2	Redbelt	Sony Pictures Classics	David Mamet (director/screenplay); Chiwetel Ejiofor, Tim Allen, Alice Braga, Randy Couture, Ricky Jay, Joe Mantegna, Emily Mortimer, David Paymer, Rebecca Pidgeon, Rodrigo Santoro, Jose Pablo Cantillo, Caroline de Souza Correa, Damon Herriman, Dan Inosanto, Enson Inoue, John Machado, Ray Mancini, Max Martini, Cyril Takayama, Jennifer Grey, Jake Johnson, Ed O'Neill, Mike Goldberg	
M A Y	2	Viva	Cult Epics / Vagrant Films Releasing	Anna Biller (director/screenplay); Anna Biller, Jared Sanford, Bridget Brno, Chad England	
M A Y	9	The Fall	Roadside Attractions	Tarsem Singh (director/screenplay); Dan Gilroy, Nico Soultanakis (screenplay); Lee Pace, Justine Waddell, Daniel Caltagirone, Robin Smith, Leo Bill, Emil Hostina, Julian Bleach, Marcus Wesley, Catinca Untaru, Jeetu Verma, Kim Uylenbroek, Ronald France	
M A Y	9	Speed Racer	Warner Bros. Pictures / Village Roadshow Pictures / Silver Pictures	The Wachowskis (directors/screenplay); Emile Hirsch, Christina Ricci, John Goodman, Susan Sarandon, Matthew Fox, Roger Allam, Benno Fürmann, Hiroyuki Sanada, Rain, Richard Roundtree, Kick Gurry, Paulie Litt, John Benfield, Christian Oliver, Yu Nan, Nayo Wallace, Melvil Poupaud, Togo Igawa, Ariel Winter, Scott Porter, Peter Fernandez, Corinne Orr, Moritz Bleibtreu, Joon Park, Milka Duno, Ralph Herforth, Nicholas Elia	
M A Y	9	What Happens in Vegas	20th Century Fox / Regency Enterprises	Tom Vaughan (director); Dana Fox (screenplay); Ashton Kutcher, Cameron Diaz, Rob Corddry, Lake Bell, Dennis Farina, Dennis Miller, Krysten Ritter, Jason Sudeikis, Michelle Krusiec, Billy Eichner, Queen Latifah, Zach Galifianakis, Treat Williams, Deirdre O'Connell, Andrew Daly, Amanda Setton, Ben Best, Maddie Corman	
M A Y	16	The Chronicles of Narnia: Prince Caspian	Walt Disney Pictures / Walden Media	Andrew Adamson (director/screenplay); Christopher Markus, Stephen McFeely (screenplay); Georgie Henley, Skandar Keynes, William Moseley, Anna Popplewell, Ben Barnes, Sergio Castellitto, Pierfrancesco Favino, Damián Alcázar, Vincent Grass, Alicia Borrachero, Simón Andreu, Predrag Bjelac, Liam Neeson, Peter Dinklage, Warwick Davis, Ken Stott, Eddie Izzard, Cornell John, Yemi Akinyemi, David Walliams, Klara Issova, Jan Pavel Filipensky, Shane Rangi, Tilda Swinton, Douglas Gresham, David Bowles, Juan Diego Montoya Garcia, Lejla Abbasová, Carlos Da Silva, Gomez Mussenden	
M A Y	16	How the Garcia Girls Spent Their Summer	Maya Entertainment	Georgina Riedel (director/screenplay); America Ferrera, Elizabeth Peña, Lucy Gallardo, Eliana Alexander, David Barrera, Steven Bauer, Alyssa Diaz, Leo Minaya, Patricia de Leon, Victor Wolf, Ana Cervantes, Jorge Cervera Jr., Marina Dena-Santo, Ricki Lopez, Alberto Montero, Rick Najera, Jane Sevilla, Perla Walters	
M A Y	20	The Flock	Genius Products	Andrew Lau (director); Hans Bauer, Craig Mitchell (screenplay); Richard Gere, Claire Danes, KaDee Strickland, Avril Lavigne, Matt Schulze, Carmen Serano, Kristina Sisco, Ray Wise, French Stewart, Paul McGowen, Russell Sams	
M A Y	22	Indiana Jones and the Kingdom of the Crystal Skull	Paramount Pictures / Lucasfilm	Steven Spielberg (director); David Koepp (screenplay); Harrison Ford, Shia LaBeouf, Cate Blanchett, Karen Allen, Ray Winstone, John Hurt, Jim Broadbent, Igor Jijikine, Joel Stoffer, Neil Flynn, Alan Dale, Andrew Divoff, Pasha D. Lychnikoff, Ilia Volok, Dimitri Diatchenko, Ernie Reyes Jr., Chet Hanks	
M A Y	23	War, Inc.	First Look Studios	Joshua Seftel (director); John Cusack, Mark Leyner, Jeremy Pikser (screenplay); John Cusack, Hilary Duff, Marisa Tomei, Joan Cusack, Dan Aykroyd, Ben Kingsley, Ben Cross, Lyubomir Neikov, Sergej Trifunović, Nikolay Stanoev, Bashar Rahal, Ned Bellamy, Montel Williams, John McLaughlin	
M A Y	25	Recount	HBO Films	Jay Roach (director); Danny Strong (screenplay); Kevin Spacey, Bob Balaban, Ed Begley Jr., Laura Dern, John Hurt, Denis Leary, Bruce McGill, Tom Wilkinson, Bruce Altman, Gary Basaraba, Mitch Pileggi, Jayne Atkinson, Marcia Jean Kurtz, Raymond Forchion, Marc Macaulay, Antoni Corone, William Schallert, Bruce Gray, Derek Cecil, Tom Hillmann, Adam LeFevre	
M A Y	28	Savage Grace	IFC Films	Tom Kalin (director); Howard A. Rodman (screenplay); Julianne Moore, Stephen Dillane, Eddie Redmayne, Elena Anaya, Unax Ugalde, Belén Rueda, Hugh Dancy	
M A Y	30	The Foot Fist Way	Paramount Vantage / MTV Films / Gary Sanchez Productions	Jody Hill (director/screenplay); Danny McBride, Ben Best (screenplay); Danny McBride, Ben Best, Mary Jane Bostic, Spencer Moreno, Carlos Lopez IV, Jody Hill, Collette Wolfe, Jonathan M. Ewart	
M A Y	30	Sex and the City	New Line Cinema / HBO Films	Michael Patrick King (director/screenplay); Sarah Jessica Parker, Kim Cattrall, Kristin Davis, Cynthia Nixon, Chris Noth, Jennifer Hudson, David Eigenberg, Jason Lewis, Evan Handler, Willie Garson, Mario Cantone, Lynn Cohen, Candice Bergen, Annaleigh Ashford, André Leon Talley, Gilles Marini, Monica Mayhem, Julie Halston, Daphne Rubin-Vega, Ben Rindner, Bridget Everett, Joseph Pupo, Alexander and Parker Fong	
M A Y	30	The Strangers	Rogue Pictures / Intrepid Pictures	Bryan Bertino (director/screenplay); Liv Tyler, Scott Speedman, Gemma Ward, Kip Weeks, Laura Margolis, Glenn Howerton, Alex Fisher, Peter Clayton-Luce	
J U N E	6	Kung Fu Panda	Paramount Pictures / DreamWorks Animation	John Stevenson, Mark Osborne (directors); Jonathan Aibel, Glenn Berger (screenplay); Jack Black, Dustin Hoffman, Angelina Jolie, Ian McShane, Jackie Chan, Seth Rogen, Lucy Liu, David Cross, Randall Duk Kim, James Hong, Dan Fogler, Michael Clarke Duncan, Wayne Knight, Kyle Gass, JR Reed, Laura Kightlinger, Kent Osborne, Kresimir Mikic, Robert Clotworthy, Steve Bulen	
J U N E	6	The Promotion	Dimension Films	Steven Conrad (director/screenplay); Seann William Scott, John C. Reilly, Jenna Fischer, Lili Taylor, Fred Armisen, Gil Bellows, Bobby Cannavale, Rick Gonzalez, Chris Conrad, Jason Bateman, Adrian Martinez, Masi Oka, Chris Gardner, Richard Henzel	
J U N E	6	You Don't Mess with the Zohan	Columbia Pictures / Relativity Media / Happy Madison Productions	Dennis Dugan (director); Adam Sandler, Robert Smigel, Judd Apatow (screenplay); Adam Sandler, John Turturro, Emmanuelle Chriqui, Nick Swardson, Lainie Kazan, Ido Mosseri, Rob Schneider, Dave Matthews, Michael Buffer, Sayed Badreya, Daoud Heidami, Kevin Nealon, Robert Smigel, Dina Doronne, Shelley Berman, John Paul DeJoria, Alec Mapa, Ahmed Ahmed, Guri Weinberg, Mousa Kraish, Mike Iorio, Maysoon Zayid, Barry Livingston, Henry Winkler, Kevin James, Chris Rock, Mariah Carey, John McEnroe, George Takei, Bruce Vilanch, Charlotte Rae, Edmund Lyndeck	
J U N E	11	Encounters at the End of the World	Image Entertainment / ThinkFilm / Discovery Films	Werner Herzog (director/screenplay); Werner Herzog, Peter Zeitlinger, Henry Kaiser	
J U N E	13	The Children of Huang Shi	Sony Pictures Classics / Hyde Park Entertainment	Roger Spottiswoode (director); Jane Hawksley, James MacManus (screenplay); Jonathan Rhys-Meyers, Radha Mitchell, Chow Yun-fat, Michelle Yeoh, Guang Li, Matt Walker, David Wenham, Anastasia Kolpakova, Ping Su, Lin Ji	
J U N E	13	The Happening	20th Century Fox / UTV Motion Pictures / Spyglass Entertainment	M. Night Shyamalan (director/screenplay); Mark Wahlberg, Zooey Deschanel, John Leguizamo, Betty Buckley, Ashlyn Sanchez, Frank Collison, Victoria Clark, Jeremy Strong, Brian O'Halloran, Alan Ruck, Mara Hobel, Joel de la Fuente, Spencer Breslin, Robert Bailey, Jr., Charlie Saxton, M. Night Shyamalan, Roberto Lombardi, Mary Ellen Driscoll	
J U N E	13	The Incredible Hulk	Universal Pictures / Marvel Studios	Louis Leterrier (director); Zak Penn (screenplay); Edward Norton, Liv Tyler, Tim Roth, William Hurt, Tim Blake Nelson, Ty Burrell, Lou Ferrigno, Robert Downey Jr., Stan Lee, Michael K. Williams, Paul Soles, Rickson Gracie, Débora Nascimento, Peter Mensah, Martin Starr, Fred Tatasciore, Christina Cabot, P.J. Kerr, Nicholas Rose	
J U N E	13	Quid Pro Quo	Magnolia Pictures	Carlos Brooks (director/screenplay); Nick Stahl, Vera Farmiga, Rachel Black, Jessica Hecht, Jacob Pitts, Ashlie Atkinson, Pablo Schreiber, Jeane Fournier, Michal Sinnott, Joshua Leonard, James Frain, Aimee Mullins, Dylan Bruno, Kate Burton, Ellen Marlow, Tommy Nelson	
J U N E	20	Brick Lane	Sony Pictures Classics	Sarah Gavron (director); Monica Ali, Laura Jones, Abi Morgan (screenplay); Tannishtha Chatterjee, Satish Kaushik, Christopher Simpson, Naeema Begum, Lana Rahman, Lalita Ahmed, Harvey Virdi, Zafreen, Harsh Nayyar, Abdul Nlephaz, Bijal Chandaria	
J U N E	20	Get Smart	Warner Bros. Pictures / Village Roadshow Pictures / Mosaic Media Group	Peter Segal (director); Tom J. Astle, Matt Ember (screenplay); Steve Carell, Anne Hathaway, Dwayne Johnson, Alan Arkin, Terence Stamp, Masi Oka, Nate Torrence, Dalip Singh, Ken Davitian, Terry Crews, David Koechner, James Caan, David S. Lee, Lindsay Hollister, Bill Murray, Patrick Warburton, John Farley, Jonathan Loughran, Jessica Barth, Larry Miller, Kevin Nealon, Blake Clark, Cedric Yarbrough, Stephen Dunham, Ryan Seacrest, Vinicius Machado, Kerry Rossall, Bernie Kopell	
J U N E	20	Kit Kittredge: An American Girl	Picturehouse / HBO Films	Patricia Rozema (director); Ann Peacock (screenplay); Abigail Breslin, Julia Ormond, Chris O'Donnell, Joan Cusack, Stanley Tucci, Max Thieriot, Jane Krakowski, Madison Davenport, Zach Mills, Austin MacDonald, Willow Smith, Wallace Shawn, Glenne Headly, Colin Mochrie, Kenneth Welsh, Brieanne Jensen, Erin Hilgartner, Dylan Scott Smith	
J U N E	20	The Love Guru	Paramount Pictures / Spyglass Entertainment	Marco Schnabel (director); Mike Myers, Graham Gordy (screenplay); Mike Myers, Jessica Alba, Justin Timberlake, Romany Malco, Meagan Good, Verne Troyer, John Oliver, Omid Djalili, Ben Kingsley, Telma Hopkins, Manu Narayan, Stephen Colbert, Jim Gaffigan, Rob Huebel, Daniel Tosh, Samantha Bee, Mariska Hargitay, Jessica Simpson, Kanye West, Val Kilmer, Rob Blake, Deepak Chopra, Oprah Winfrey	
J U N E	27	Finding Amanda	Magnolia Pictures	Peter Tolan (director/screenplay); Matthew Broderick, Brittany Snow, Peter Facinelli, Maura Tierney, Steve Coogan, Daniel Roebuck, Bill Fagerbakke, J.P. Manoux, Jennifer Hall, Allie McCulloch, Kate Micucci	
J U N E	27	WALL-E	Walt Disney Pictures / Pixar Animation Studios	Andrew Stanton (director/screenplay); Jim Reardon (screenplay); Ben Burtt, Elissa Knight, Jeff Garlin, Fred Willard, John Ratzenberger, Kathy Najimy, Sigourney Weaver, MacInTalk, Teddy Newton, Bob Bergen, John Cygan, Pete Docter, Paul Eiding, Donald Fullilove, Teresa Ganzel, Jess Harnell, Sherry Lynn, Laraine Newman, Lori Alan, Jeff Pidgeon, Jan Rabson, Andrew Stanton, Jim Ward, Angus MacLane	
J U N E	27	Wanted	Universal Pictures / Spyglass Entertainment / Relativity Media	Timur Bekmambetov (director); Michael Brandt, Derek Haas, Chris Morgan (screenplay); James McAvoy, Morgan Freeman, Angelina Jolie, Thomas Kretschmann, Common, Konstantin Khabensky, Marc Warren, Terence Stamp, David O'Hara, Chris Pratt, Kristen Hager, Sophiya Haque, Dato Bakhtadze, Lorna Scott	

== July–September ==
Opening		Title	Production company	Cast and crew	Ref.
J U L Y	2	Hancock	Columbia Pictures / Relativity Media / Overbrook Entertainment / Weed Road Pictures / Blue Light	Peter Berg (director); Vy Vincent Ngo, Vince Gilligan (screenplay); Will Smith, Charlize Theron, Jason Bateman, Eddie Marsan, Johnny Galecki, Thomas Lennon, Mike Epps, Akiva Goldsman, Michael Mann, Nancy Grace, Daeg Faerch, Atticus Shaffer	
J U L Y	3	The Wackness	Sony Pictures Classics / SBK Pictures	Jonathan Levine (director/screenplay); Ben Kingsley, Josh Peck, Famke Janssen, Olivia Thirlby, Mary-Kate Olsen, Method Man, Cesar Evora, Fernando Colunga, David Wohl, Jane Adams, Talia Balsam, Aaron Yoo	
J U L Y	11	Garden Party	Roadside Attractions	Jason Freeland (director/screenplay); Vinessa Shaw, Willa Holland, Richard Gunn, Patrick Fischler, Fiona Dourif, Erik Smith, Alexander Cendese, Ross Patterson, Jordan Havard, Christopher Allport, Jeffrey R. Newman, Jennifer Lawrence	
J U L Y	11	Hellboy II: The Golden Army	Universal Pictures / Relativity Media	Guillermo del Toro (director/screenplay); Ron Perlman, Selma Blair, Doug Jones, Luke Goss, Anna Walton, Jeffrey Tambor, John Hurt, Brian Steele, Roy Dotrice, John Alexander, James Dodd	
J U L Y	11	Journey to the Center of the Earth	New Line Cinema / Walden Media	Eric Brevig (director); Michael D. Weiss, Mark Levin, Jennifer Flackett (screenplay); Brendan Fraser, Josh Hutcherson, Anita Briem, Seth Meyers, Jean-Michel Paré, Jane Wheeler, Giancarlo Caltabiano, Garth Gilker	
J U L Y	11	Meet Dave	20th Century Fox / Regency Enterprises	Brian Robbins (director); Bill Corbett, Rob Greenberg (screenplay); Eddie Murphy, Elizabeth Banks, Gabrielle Union, Ed Helms, Marc Blucas, Scott Caan, Kevin Hart, Yvette Nicole Brown, Mike O'Malley, Pat Kilbane, Miguel A. Núñez Jr., Allisyn Ashley Arm, Judah Friedlander, Jim Turner, Brian Huskey, Shawn Christian, Rob Moran, John Gatins, Smith Cho, David Goldsmith, Paul Scheer, James Michael Connor, Kristen Connolly, Floyd Levine, The Naked Cowboy, Alisan Porter, Austyn Lind Myers, Tariq Bah, Adam Tomei	
J U L Y	11	Roman Polanski: Wanted and Desired	ThinkFilm / HBO	Marina Zenovich (director/screenplay); Joe Bini, P.G. Morgan (screenplay); Roman Polanski, Marilyn Beck, Samantha Geimer, Mia Farrow, Pedro Almodóvar, Pierre-André Boutang, Nicolas Cage, Michael Caine, John Cassavetes, Dick Cavett, Joan Collins, Stephen Daldry, Catherine Deneuve, Faye Dunaway, Harrison Ford, Gene Gutowski, Russell Harty, Hugh Hefner, Mick Jagger, Clive James, Ken Jones, Hawk Koch, Hanna Landy, Rob Marshall, Daniel Melnick, Jack Nicholson, Barbara Parkins, Laurence J. Rittenband, Jay Sebring, Lorenzo Semple Jr., Terence Stamp, Meryl Streep, Anthea Sylbert, Sharon Tate, Stephen S. Trott, Phillip Vannatter, Mike Wallace, Leonor Watling, David Wells	
J U L Y	18	The Dark Knight	Warner Bros. Pictures / Legendary Pictures / DC Comics / Syncopy	Christopher Nolan (director/screenplay); Jonathan Nolan (screenplay); Christian Bale, Heath Ledger, Michael Caine, Gary Oldman, Aaron Eckhart, Maggie Gyllenhaal, Morgan Freeman, Monique Gabriela Curnen, Ron Dean, Nestor Carbonell, Chin Han, Eric Roberts, Ritchie Coster, Anthony Michael Hall, Keith Szarabajka, Colin McFarlane, Joshua Harto, Melinda McGraw, Nathan Gamble, Michael Jai White, Cillian Murphy, Michael Stoyanov, William Smillie, Danny Goldring, William Fichtner, Beatrice Rosen, Edison Chen, Nydia Rodriguez Terracina, Vincenzo Nicoli, United States Senator Patrick Leahy, Jennifer Knox, Sarah Jayne Dunn, Chucky Venn, David Dastmalchian, Richard Dillane, Philip Bulcock, Paul Birchard, Vincent Riotta, K. Todd Freeman, Matt Rippy, Ariyon Bakare, Tommy Campbell, Craig Heaney, Lorna Gayle, Lisa McAllister, Matthew Leitch, Tommy "Tiny" Lister Jr., Bronson Webb, David Ajala, Nigel Carrington, Matt Skiba, Jonathan Sadowski, Johnathon Schaech, Jamie Cho, Charles Jarman, Nicky Katt, Donovan Leitch Jr., Vivek Shah	
J U L Y	18	Mamma Mia!	Universal Pictures / Relativity Media / Playtone	Phyllida Lloyd (director); Catherine Johnson (screenplay); Meryl Streep, Pierce Brosnan, Colin Firth, Stellan Skarsgård, Julie Walters, Dominic Cooper, Amanda Seyfried, Christine Baranski, Niall Buggy, Chris Jarvis, Ashley Lilley, Rachel McDowall, Philip Michael, Juan Pablo Di Pace, Enzo Squillino, Ricardo Montez, Benny Andersson, Spencer Kayden, Björn Ulvaeus, Rita Wilson	
J U L Y	18	Space Chimps	20th Century Fox / Starz Animation / Vanguard Animation	Kirk DeMicco (director/screenplay); Rob Moreland (screenplay); Andy Samberg, Cheryl Hines, Jeff Daniels, Patrick Warburton, Kristin Chenoweth, Kenan Thompson, Zack Shada, Carlos Alazraqui, Omid Abtahi, Patrick Breen, Jane Lynch, Kath Soucie, Stanley Tucci, Wally Wingert, Tom Kenny, Jason Harris, Jess Harnell, Ellie Harvie	
J U L Y	25	Step Brothers	Columbia Pictures / Relativity Media / Gary Sanchez Productions / Apatow Productions / Mosaic Media Group	Adam McKay (director/screenplay); Will Ferrell (screenplay); Will Ferrell, John C. Reilly, Richard Jenkins, Mary Steenburgen, Adam Scott, Kathryn Hahn, Andrea Savage, Rob Riggle, Lurie Poston, Ken Jeong, Wayne Federman, Phil LaMarr, Matt Walsh, Seth Rogen, Gillian Vigman, Horatio Sanz, Travis T. Flory, Shira Piven, Seth Morris, Maria Quiban, Danielle Schneider, Brian Huskey, Chris Henchy, Ian Roberts, Jake Szymanski, Brent White, Elizabeth Yozamp	
J U L Y	25	The X-Files: I Want to Believe	20th Century Fox	Chris Carter (director/screenplay); Frank Spotnitz (screenplay); David Duchovny, Gillian Anderson, Amanda Peet, Billy Connolly, Xzibit, Mitch Pileggi, Callum Keith Rennie, Adam Godley, Xantha Radley, Fagin Woodcock, Nicki Aycox, Alex Diakun	
A U G U S T	1	Frozen River	Sony Pictures Classics	Courtney Hunt (director/screenplay); Melissa Leo, Misty Upham, Charlie McDermott, Michael O'Keefe, Mark Boone Junior, James Reilly, Dylan Carusona, Jay Klaitz, Michael Sky, John Canoe	
A U G U S T	1	The Midnight Meat Train	Lionsgate / Lakeshore Entertainment	Ryuhei Kitamura (director); Jeff Buhler (screenplay); Bradley Cooper, Leslie Bibb, Brooke Shields, Roger Bart, Ted Raimi, Vinnie Jones, Peter Jacobson, Barbara Eve Harris, Tony Curran, Stephanie Mace, Quinton Jackson, Allen Maldonado	
A U G U S T	1	The Mummy: Tomb of the Dragon Emperor	Universal Pictures / Relativity Media / The Sommers Company / Alphaville Films	Rob Cohen (director); Alfred Gough, Miles Millar (screenplay); Brendan Fraser, Jet Li, Maria Bello, Michelle Yeoh, John Hannah, Luke Ford, Isabella Leong, Russell Wong, Anthony Wong, Liam Cunningham, David Calder, Jessey Meng, Albert Kwan	
A U G U S T	1	Swing Vote	Touchstone Pictures	Joshua Michael Stern (director/screenplay); Kevin Costner, Paula Patton, Kelsey Grammer, Dennis Hopper, Nathan Lane, Stanley Tucci, George Lopez, Madeline Carroll, Judge Reinhold, Charles Esten (as Charles 'Chip' Esten), Mare Winningham, Mark Moses, Nana Visitor, Dale O'Malley, Aaron Brown, Campbell Brown, Mary Hart, Arianna Huffington, James Carville, Larry King, Bill Maher, Chris Matthews, Willie Nelson, Lawrence O'Donnell, Richard Petty	
A U G U S T	6	Pineapple Express	Columbia Pictures / Relativity Media / Apatow Productions	David Gordon Green (director); Seth Rogen, Evan Goldberg (screenplay); Seth Rogen, James Franco, Gary Cole, Rosie Perez, Danny McBride, Kevin Corrigan, Craig Robinson, Ken Jeong, Amber Heard, Ed Begley Jr., Nora Dunn, Joe Lo Truglio, Cleo King, Bill Hader, James Remar, Troy Gentile, Connie Sawyer, Bobby Lee, Justin Long, David McDivitt, Bibek Adhikari, Arthur Napiontek, Dana Lee	
A U G U S T	6	The Sisterhood of the Traveling Pants 2	Warner Bros. Pictures / Alcon Entertainment	Sanaa Hamri (director); Elizabeth Chandler (screenplay); Amber Tamblyn, America Ferrera, Blake Lively, Alexis Bledel, Michael Rady, Leonardo Nam, Jesse Williams, Tom Wisdom, Lucy Hale, Rachel Nichols, Kyle Schmid, Shohreh Aghdashloo, Blythe Danner, Rachel Ticotin, Ernie Lively, Alison Folland, Carly Rose Sonenclar, Erik Jensen, Adrienne Houghton, Kiely Williams, Victor Slezak, Kyle MacLachlan	
A U G U S T	8	Beer For My Horses	Roadside Attractions	Michael Salomon (director); Rodney Carrington, Toby Keith, W.T. Scrags (screenplay); Toby Keith, Rodney Carrington, Willie Nelson, Ted Nugent, Barry Corbin, Claire Forlani, Curtis Armstrong, Tom Skerritt, Gina Gershon, Greg Serano, Carlos Sanz, Chris Browning, Mac Davis, Keith Jardine, David Allan Coe, Mel Tillis, Sam Carrington, Stelen Covel	
A U G U S T	8	Elegy	Samuel Goldwyn Films / Lakeshore Entertainment	Isabel Coixet (director); Nicholas Meyer (screenplay); Penélope Cruz, Ben Kingsley, Dennis Hopper, Patricia Clarkson, Peter Sarsgaard, Deborah Harry, Antonio Cupo, Michelle Harrison, Sonja Bennett, Chelah Horsdal, Charlie Rose	
A U G U S T	8	Hell Ride	Dimension Films	Larry Bishop (director/screenplay); Larry Bishop, Michael Madsen, Eric Balfour, Vinnie Jones, Leonor Varela, David Carradine, Dennis Hopper, Michael Beach, Laura Cayouette, Julia Jones, Francesco Quinn, Allison McAtee, David Grieco, Kanin Howell, Andrea Fellers, Maja Mandzuka, Claudia Salinas, Cassandra Hepburn, Cristos, Pete Randall, Dean Delray, Lee Alfred, Michael Macecsko, Terry Fradet, Steve McCammon, Theresa Alexandra, Alyson Sullivan, Tracy Phillips, Amber Hay, Natasha Yi, Diana Prince	
A U G U S T	8	What We Do Is Secret	Peace Arch Entertainment	Rodger Grossman (director/screenplay); Shane West, Bijou Phillips, Rick Gonzalez, Noah Segan, Ashton Holmes, Tina Majorino, Lauren German, Keir O'Donnell, Sebastian Roché, Azura Skye, Ozzy Benn, Christopher Boyd, Missy Doty, Amy Halloran, Michele Hicks, J.P. Manoux, Ray Park, Kylan James, Chris Pontius, Randi Newton, Anna Waronker, Giddle Partridge, John Westernoff, The Mae Shi, The Bronx	
A U G U S T	10	Star Wars: The Clone Wars	Lucasfilm Ltd. / Lucasfilm Animation	Dave Filoni (director); Henry Gilroy (screenplay); Matt Lanter, Ashley Eckstein, James Arnold Taylor, Dee Bradley Baker, Tom Kane, Catherine Taber, Nika Futterman, Ian Abercrombie, Corey Burton, Matthew Wood, Kevin Michael Richardson, David Acord, Samuel L. Jackson, Anthony Daniels, Christopher Lee	
A U G U S T	13	Tropic Thunder	DreamWorks Pictures / Red Hour Films	Ben Stiller (director/screenplay); Justin Theroux, Etan Cohen (screenplay); Ben Stiller, Jack Black, Robert Downey Jr., Steve Coogan, Jay Baruchel, Danny McBride, Brandon T. Jackson, Bill Hader, Nick Nolte, Brandon Soo Hoo, Reggie Lee, Trieu Than, Matthew McConaughey, Tom Cruise, Tobey Maguire, Tyra Banks, Maria Menounos, Martin Lawrence, The Mooney Suzuki, Jason Bateman, Lance Bass, Jennifer Love Hewitt, Alicia Silverstone, Christine Taylor, Mini Anden, Anthony Ruivivar, Rachel Avery, Yvette Nicole Brown, Sean Penn, Jon Voight, Justin Theroux	
A U G U S T	15	The Flyboys	Dark Coast Pictures	Rocco DeVilliers (director/screenplay); Reiley McClendon, Jesse James, Stephen Baldwin, Tom Sizemore	
A U G U S T	15	Fly Me to the Moon	Summit Entertainment / nWave Pictures	Ben Stassen (director); Domonic Paris (screenplay); Christopher Lloyd, Kelly Ripa, Nicollette Sheridan, Tim Curry, Trevor Gagnon, Philip Daniel Bolden, David Gore, Ed Begley, Jr., Adrienne Barbeau, Robert Patrick, Buzz Aldrin, Sandy Simpson, Eddie Frierson, Steve Kramer, Mimi Maynard, Lloyd Sherr, Charles Rocket, Phil Proctor, Nicholas Guest, Archie Hahn, Scott Menville, Michael McConnohie, Doug Stone, Max Burkholder, Mona Marshall, Barbara Goodson, Gregg Berger, Lorraine Nicholson, Neil Armstrong, Melora Harte, Cam Clarke, Grant George, Gigi Perreau	
A U G U S T	15	Henry Poole Is Here	Overture Films / Lakeshore Entertainment	Mark Pellington (director); Albert Torres (screenplay); Luke Wilson, Radha Mitchell, George Lopez, Cheryl Hines, Adriana Barraza, Richard Benjamin, Morgan Lily, Beth Grant, Rachel Seiferth	
A U G U S T	15	Mirrors	20th Century Fox / Regency Enterprises	Alexandre Aja (director/screenplay); Grégory Levasseur (screenplay); Kiefer Sutherland, Paula Patton, Amy Smart, Cameron Boyce, Erica Gluck, Mary Beth Hurt, John Shrapnel, Jason Flemyng, Tim Ahern, Julian Glover, Josh Cole, Ezra Buzzington, Aida Doina	
A U G U S T	15	Vicky Cristina Barcelona	The Weinstein Company	Woody Allen (director/screenplay); Javier Bardem, Penélope Cruz, Scarlett Johansson, Patricia Clarkson, Kevin Dunn, Rebecca Hall, Chris Messina, Pablo Schreiber, Carrie Preston, Zak Orth, Julio Perillán, Christopher Evan Welch, Joan Pera	
A U G U S T	20	The Rocker	20th Century Fox	Peter Cattaneo (director); Maya Forbes, Wallace Wolodarsky (screenplay); Rainn Wilson, Christina Applegate, Josh Gad, Teddy Geiger, Emma Stone, Jason Sudeikis, Jane Lynch, Jeff Garlin, Will Arnett, Fred Armisen, Howard Hesseman, Lonny Ross, Bradley Cooper, Jon Glaser, Demetri Martin, Aziz Ansari, Nicole Arbour, Pete Best, Jane Krakowski, Samantha Weinstein, Jonathan Malen	
A U G U S T	22	Death Race	Universal Pictures / Relativity Media	Paul W. S. Anderson (director/screenplay); Jason Statham, Tyrese Gibson, Ian McShane, Joan Allen, Natalie Martinez, Max Ryan, Jason Clarke, Frederick Koehler, Jacob Vargas, Justin Mader, Robert LaSardo, Robin Shou, David Carradine	
A U G U S T	22	The Fifth Commandment	Freestyle Releasing	Rick Yune	
A U G U S T	22	Hamlet 2	Focus Features	Andrew Fleming (director/screenplay); Pam Brady (screenplay); Steve Coogan, Catherine Keener, David Arquette, Elisabeth Shue, Amy Poehler, Marshall Bell, Skylar Astin, Phoebe Strole, Melonie Diaz, Joseph Julian Soria, Arnie Pantoja, Nat Faxon, Natalie Amenula, Michael Esparza, Shea Pepe, Arlin Alcala	
A U G U S T	22	The House Bunny	Columbia Pictures / Relativity Media / Happy Madison Productions	Fred Wolf (director); Karen McCullah Lutz, Kirsten Smith (screenplay); Anna Faris, Colin Hanks, Emma Stone, Kat Dennings, Katharine McPhee, Rumer Willis, Kiely Williams, Dana Goodman, Kimberly Makkouk, Monet Mazur, Sarah Wright, Rachel Specter, Beverly D'Angelo, Hugh Hefner, Tyson Ritter, Owen Benjamin, Christopher McDonald, Matt Barr, Justin Baldoni, Allen Covert, Dan Patrick, Nick Swardson, Jonathan Loughran, Holly Madison, Kendra Wilkinson, Bridget Marquardt, Shaquille O'Neal, Matt Leinart, Sara Jean Underwood, Lauren Michelle Hill, Louise Cochrane, Hayley Fisher	
A U G U S T	22	The Longshots	Metro-Goldwyn-Mayer / Dimension Films	Fred Durst (director); Nick Santora (screenplay); Ice Cube, Keke Palmer, Dash Mihok, Tasha Smith, Jill Marie Jones, Matt Craven, Malcolm Goodwin, Debby Ryan, Chloe Bridges, Kofi Siriboe, Garrett Morris, Alan Aisenberg, Michael Colyar, Earthquake, Glenn Plummer, Wayne Dehart, Dean Delray	
A U G U S T	22	Trouble the Water	Zeitgeist Films	Tia Lessin, Carl Deal (directors); Kimberly Rivers Roberts, Scott Roberts	
A U G U S T	26	The Little Mermaid: Ariel's Beginning	Walt Disney Studios Home Entertainment	Peggy Holmes (director); Robert Reece, Evan Spiliotopoulos (screenplay); Jodi Benson, Samuel E. Wright, Jim Cummings, Sally Field, Tara Strong, Jennifer Hale, Grey DeLisle, Jeff Bennett, Kari Wahlgren, Andrea Robinson, Kevin Michael Richardson, Rob Paulsen, Maurice LaMarche, Parker Goris, Lorelei Hill Butters, Michelle Loucadoux	
A U G U S T	27	Traitor	Overture Films	Jeffrey Nachmanoff (director/screenplay); Don Cheadle, Guy Pearce, Saïd Taghmaoui, Neal McDonough, Alyy Khan, Jeff Daniels, Archie Panjabi, Mozhan Marnò, Lorena Gale	
A U G U S T	29	Babylon A.D.	20th Century Fox	Mathieu Kassovitz (director/screenplay); Éric Besnard (screenplay); Vin Diesel, Michelle Yeoh, Mélanie Thierry, Gérard Depardieu, Charlotte Rampling, Mark Strong, Lambert Wilson, Jérôme Le Banner, David Belle	
A U G U S T	29	College	Metro-Goldwyn-Mayer	Deb Hagan (director); Dan Callahan, Adam Ellison (screenplay); Drake Bell, Kevin Covais, Andrew Caldwell, Haley Bennett, Nick Zano, Gary Owen, Zach Cregger, Camille Mana, Alona Tal, Ryan Pinkston, Verne Troyer, Jessica Heap, Melissa Lingafelt, Stephanie Honore, Tracy Mulholland, Nathalie Walker, Reggie Martinez, Valentina Vaughn, Heather Vandeven, Andree Moss, Carolyn Moss, Wendy Talley, Brandi Coleman, Todd Voltz, Brandy Blake, Ava Santana, Josh Tenk	
A U G U S T	29	Disaster Movie	Lionsgate	Jason Friedberg, Aaron Seltzer (directors/screenplay); Matt Lanter, Vanessa Minnillo, Gary "G Thang" Johnson, Kim Kardashian, Crista Flanagan, Nicole Parker, Ike Barinholtz, Carmen Electra, Tony Cox, Tad Hilgenbrink, Nick Steele, Jason Boegh, Valerie Wildman, John Di Domenico, Abe Spigner, Christopher Johnson, Jared S. Eddo, Yoshio Iizuka, Jonas Neal, Jacob Tolano Wood, Roland Kickinger, Walter Harris, Gerrard Fachinni, Johnny Rock, Devin Crittenden, Noah Harpster, Austin Michael Scott	
A U G U S T	29	Goal II: Living the Dream	Walt Disney Pictures	Jaume Collet-Serra (director); Adrian Butchart, Mike Jefferies, Terry Loane (screenplay); Kuno Becker, Stephen Dillane, Anna Friel, Leonor Varela, Rutger Hauer, Alessandro Nivola, Frances Barber, Míriam Colón, Sean Pertwee, Elizabeth Peña, Mike Jefferies, Jorge Jurado, Nick Cannon, Shammi Aulakh, David Beckham, Ronaldo, Sergio Ramos, Roberto Carlos, Ronaldinho, Zinedine Zidane, Iván Helguera, Thomas Gravesen, Carles Puyol, Samuel Eto'o, Iker Casillas, Thierry Henry, Guti, Jens Lehmann, Cesc Fàbregas, Raúl, Raul Bravo, Robert Pires, Arsène Wenger, Freddie Ljungberg, Roberto Soldado, Vicente Rodríguez, Lionel Messi, Victor Valdés, Florentino Pérez, Steve McManaman, Juninho, Mahamadou Diarra, Diego López, Tiago, Milan Baroš, Stefano Farina	
S E P T E M B E R	5	Bangkok Dangerous	Lionsgate / Virtual Studios / Saturn Films	Pang Brothers (directors/screenplay); Nicolas Cage, Chakrit Yamnam, Charlie Yeung, James Wearing Smith, Nirattisai Kaljaruek, Panward Hemmanee, Peter Shadrin, Dom Hetrakul, Napassakorn Midaim	
S E P T E M B E R	5	Surfer, Dude	Anchor Bay Entertainment	S.R. Bindler (director/screenplay); Mark Gustawes, George Mays, Cory Van Dyke (screenplay); Matthew McConaughey, Alexie Gilmore, Scott Glenn, Jeffrey Nordling, Willie Nelson, Woody Harrelson, Sarah Wright, Nathan Phillips, Zachary Knighton, Ramón Rodríguez, John Terry, Todd Stashwick, Travis Fimmel, K.D. Aubert, Malena Maestas, Anaisa Maestas	
S E P T E M B E R	12	Burn After Reading	Focus Features / StudioCanal / Relativity Media / Working Title Films / Mike Zoss Productions	Joel Coen, Ethan Coen (directors/screenplay); George Clooney, Frances McDormand, John Malkovich, Tilda Swinton, Brad Pitt, Richard Jenkins, Elizabeth Marvel, David Rasche, J.K. Simmons, Olek Krupa	
S E P T E M B E R	12	The Family That Preys	Lionsgate / Tyler Perry Studios	Tyler Perry (director/screenplay); Alfre Woodard, Sanaa Lathan, Rockmond Dunbar, KaDee Strickland, Cole Hauser, Taraji P. Henson, Tyler Perry, Kathy Bates, Robin Givens, Sebastian Siegel	
S E P T E M B E R	12	Proud American	Slowhand Cinema	Fred Ashman (director/screenplay); Hayley Chase, Jonathan Banks, Dennis Haskins, Ken Howard, Marc McClure, Kimberlin Brown	
S E P T E M B E R	12	Towelhead	Warner Independent Pictures	Alan Ball (director/screenplay); Aaron Eckhart, Toni Collette, Maria Bello, Peter Macdissi, Summer Bishil, Matt Letscher, Chase Ellison, Carrie Preston, Lynn Collins, Chris Messina, Shari Headley, Irina Voronina, Randy Goodwin	
S E P T E M B E R	12	The Women	Picturehouse	Diane English (director/screenplay); Meg Ryan, Annette Bening, Eva Mendes, Debra Messing, Jada Pinkett Smith, Carrie Fisher, Cloris Leachman, Debi Mazar, Bette Midler, Candice Bergen, India Ennenga, Jill Flint, Ana Gasteyer, Joanna Gleason, Lynn Whitfield, Natasha Alam, Tilly Scott Pedersen, Christy Scott Cashman	
S E P T E M B E R	19	Battle in Seattle	Redwood Palms Pictures	Stuart Townsend (director/screenplay); André Benjamin, Jennifer Carpenter, Woody Harrelson, Martin Henderson, Ray Liotta, Connie Nielsen, Michelle Rodriguez, Channing Tatum, Charlize Theron, Ivana Miličević, Tzi Ma, Isaach De Bankolé, Rade Serbedzija	
S E P T E M B E R	19	The Duchess	Paramount Vantage	Saul Dibb (director/screenplay); Jeffrey Hatcher, Anders Thomas Jensen (screenplay); Keira Knightley, Ralph Fiennes, Charlotte Rampling, Dominic Cooper, Hayley Atwell, Aidan McArdle, Simon McBurney, Sebastian Applewhite, Calvin Dean, Emily Jewell, Richard McCabe, Bruce Mackinnon, Alistair Petrie, Georgia King, Camilla Arfwedson	
S E P T E M B E R	19	Ghost Town	DreamWorks Pictures / Spyglass Entertainment	David Koepp (director/screenplay); John Kamps (screenplay); Ricky Gervais, Téa Leoni, Greg Kinnear, Billy Campbell, Kristen Wiig, Dana Ivey, Aasif Mandvi, Alan Ruck, Betty Gilpin, Brian d'Arcy James, Brian Tarantina, Jeff Hiller, Michael-Leon Wooley, Aaron Tveit, Bridget Moloney	
S E P T E M B E R	19	Hounddog	Empire Film Group	Deborah Kampmeier (director/screenplay); Dakota Fanning, Piper Laurie, David Morse, Robin Wright Penn, Isabelle Fuhrman, Jill Scott, Christoph Sanders, Cody Hanford, Afemo Omilami, Ryan Pelton, Sean A. Wallace	
S E P T E M B E R	19	Igor	Metro-Goldwyn-Mayer / The Weinstein Company	Tony Leondis (director); Chris McKenna (screenplay); John Cusack, Steve Buscemi, John Cleese, Jennifer Coolidge, Arsenio Hall, Sean Hayes, Eddie Izzard, Jay Leno, Molly Shannon, Christian Slater, Paul Vogt, James Lipton, Jess Harnell, Matt McKenna, Max Howard, Tony Leondis, Chris McKenna, Christopher Maleki, Frank Welker	
S E P T E M B E R	19	Lakeview Terrace	Screen Gems / Overbrook Entertainment	Neil LaBute (director); David Loughery, Howard Korder (screenplay); Samuel L. Jackson, Patrick Wilson, Kerry Washington, Jay Hernandez, Keith Loneker, Ron Glass, Caleeb Pinkett, Justin Chambers, Lynn Chen, Dale Godboldo, Robert Pine, Bitsie Tulloch, Eva LaRue, Jaishon Fisher, Regine Nehy, Robert Dahey, Ho-Jung	
S E P T E M B E R	19	Local Color	Monterey Media	George Gallo (director/screenplay); Armin Mueller-Stahl, Trevor Morgan, Ray Liotta, Samantha Mathis, Ron Perlman, Diana Scarwid, Charles Durning	
S E P T E M B E R	19	My Best Friend's Girl	Lionsgate	Howard Deutch (director); Jordan Cahan (screenplay); Dane Cook, Kate Hudson, Jason Biggs, Alec Baldwin, Diora Baird, Lizzy Caplan, Taran Killam, Malcolm Barrett, Riki Lindhome, Mini Anden, Jenny Mollen, Robert Fennessy II, Brad Garrett, Nate Torrence, Joshua Rego	
S E P T E M B E R	26	Choke	Fox Searchlight Pictures	Clark Gregg (director/screenplay); Sam Rockwell, Anjelica Huston, Kelly Macdonald, Brad William Henke, Paz de la Huerta, Gillian Jacobs, Clark Gregg, Bijou Phillips, Joel Grey, Jonah Bobo, Chuck Palahniuk	
S E P T E M B E R	26	Eagle Eye	DreamWorks Pictures	D.J. Caruso (director); John Glenn, Travis Adam Wright, Hillary Seitz, Dan McDermott (screenplay); Shia LaBeouf, Michelle Monaghan, Rosario Dawson, Michael Chiklis, Anthony Mackie, Billy Bob Thornton, Ethan Embry, Anthony Azizi, Cameron Boyce, Lynn Cohen, Bill Smitrovich, William Sadler, Dariush Kashani, Sean Kinney, Madylin Sweeten, Eric Christian Olsen, Marc Singer, Cylk Cozart, Manny Perry, Colby French, Katija Pevec, Enver Gjokaj, Brittany Ishibashi, Lesley Stahl, Leyna Nguyen, Ralph Garman, Sharon Tay, Kent Shocknek, Jerry Ferrara, Julianne Moore, Nick Searcy	
S E P T E M B E R	26	Fireproof	Samuel Goldwyn Films	Alex Kendrick (director/screenplay); Stephen Kendrick (screenplay); Kirk Cameron, Erin Bethea, Ken Bevel, Stephen Dervan, Jason McLeod, Alex Kendrick, Chelsea Noble	
S E P T E M B E R	26	Forever Strong	Crane Movie Company	Ryan Little (director); David Pliler (screenplay); Sean Astin, Penn Badgley, Sean Faris, Gary Cole, Arielle Kebbel, Yolanda Wood, Neal McDonough, Julie Warner, Olesya Rulin, Larry Bagby, Michael J. Pagan, Nathan West, Max Kasch, Tyler Kain, Ryan Roundy	
S E P T E M B E R	26	Miracle at St. Anna	Touchstone Pictures / 40 Acres and a Mule Filmworks	Spike Lee (director); James McBride (screenplay); Derek Luke, Michael Ealy, Laz Alonso, Omar Benson Miller, Pierfrancesco Favino, Valentina Cervi, Matteo Sciabordi, John Turturro, Joseph Gordon-Levitt, Kerry Washington, Naomi Campbell, John Leguizamo, D.B. Sweeney, Robert John Burke, Omari Hardwick, Omero Antonutti, Sergio Albelli, Lydia Biondi, Michael K. Williams, Walton Goggins, Christian Berkel, Jan Pohl, Alexandra Maria Lara	
S E P T E M B E R	26	Nights in Rodanthe	Warner Bros. Pictures / Village Roadshow Pictures	George C. Wolfe (director); Ann Peacock, John Romano (screenplay); Richard Gere, Diane Lane, James Franco, Scott Glenn, Christopher Meloni, Viola Davis, Pablo Schreiber, Mae Whitman, Charlie Tahan, Ato Essandoh	

== October–December ==
Opening		Title	Production company	Cast and crew	Ref.
O C T O B E R	3	An American Carol	Vivendi Entertainment / Mpower Pictures	David Zucker (director/screenplay); Myrna Sokoloff, Lewis Friedman (screenplay); Kevin Farley, Kelsey Grammer, Jon Voight, Dennis Hopper, Leslie Nielsen, Jillian Murray, Sammy Sheik, Robert Davi, Geoffrey Arend, James Woods, Chriss Anglin, Kevin Sorbo, Travis Schuldt, Trace Adkins, Bill O'Reilly, David Alan Grier, Gary Coleman, Fred Travalena, Vicki Browne, Paris Hilton, Simon Rex, Zachary Levi, John O'Hurley, Mary Hart	
O C T O B E R	3	Appaloosa	New Line Cinema	Ed Harris (director/screenplay); Viggo Mortensen, Ed Harris, Renée Zellweger, Jeremy Irons, Lance Henriksen, Timothy Spall, Ariadna Gil, James Gammon, Tom Bower, Rex Linn, Adam Nelson, Corby Griesenbeck, Timothy V. Murphy, Agathe Golaszewska, Makenzie Vega, Bob Harris	
O C T O B E R	3	Beverly Hills Chihuahua	Walt Disney Pictures / Mandeville Films	Raja Gosnell (director); Analisa LaBianco, Jeff Bushell (screenplay); Jamie Lee Curtis, Piper Perabo, Manolo Cardona, Ali Hillis, Maury Sterling, Jesús Ochoa, José María Yazpik, Eugenio Derbez, Drew Barrymore, Andy García, George Lopez, Edward James Olmos, Plácido Domingo, Paul Rodriguez, Cheech Marin, Loretta Devine, Leslie Mann, Luis Guzmán, Michael Urie, Eddie "Piolín" Sotelo	
O C T O B E R	3	Flash of Genius	Universal Pictures / Spyglass Entertainment	Marc Abraham (director); Philip Railsback (screenplay); Greg Kinnear, Lauren Graham, Dermot Mulroney, Alan Alda, Mitch Pileggi, Daniel Roebuck, Bill Smitrovich, Tim Kelleher, Jake Abel, Tatiana Maslany, Ben & Gavin Kuiack	
O C T O B E R	3	How to Lose Friends & Alienate People	Metro-Goldwyn-Mayer	Robert B. Weide (director); Peter Straughan (screenplay); Simon Pegg, Kirsten Dunst, Danny Huston, Gillian Anderson, Megan Fox, Jeff Bridges, Bill Paterson, Max Minghella, Miriam Margoyles, Margo Stilley, Jefferson Mays, Diana Kent, Nathalie Cox, Charlotte Devaney, Brian Austin Green, Thandie Newton, Chris O'Dowd, James Corden, Katherine Parkinson, Ricky Gervais, Kate Winslet, Daniel Craig	
O C T O B E R	3	Nick & Norah's Infinite Playlist	Columbia Pictures / Mandate Pictures	Peter Sollett (director); Lorene Scafaria (screenplay): Michael Cera, Kat Dennings, Alexis Dziena, Ari Graynor, Aaron Yoo, Rafi Gavron, Jonathan B. Wright, Jay Baruchel, Rachel Cohn, David Levithan, Lorene Scafaria, Seth Meyers, Andy Samberg, Eddie Kaye Thomas, John Cho, Kevin Corrigan, Devendra Banhart	
O C T O B E R	3	Rachel Getting Married	Sony Pictures Classics	Jonathan Demme (director); Jenny Lumet (screenplay); Anne Hathaway, Rosemarie DeWitt, Bill Irwin, Tunde Adebimpe, Mather Zickel, Anna Deavere Smith, Debra Winger, Beau Sia, Tamyra Gray, Sebastian Stan, Annaleigh Ashford, Donald Harrison Jr., Robyn Hitchcock, Fab 5 Freddy, Sister Carol, ElSaffar, Tawil	
O C T O B E R	10	Body of Lies	Warner Bros. Pictures / Scott Free Productions	Ridley Scott (director); William Monahan (screenplay); Leonardo DiCaprio, Russell Crowe, Mark Strong, Golshifteh Farahani, Oscar Isaac, Ali Suliman, Alon Abutbul, Vince Colosimo, Simon McBurney, Mehdi Nebbou, Michael Gaston, Kais Nashef, Jamil Khoury, Lubna Azabal, Ghali Benlafkih, Youssef Srondy, Ali Khalil, Annabelle Wallis, Michael Stuhlbarg, Giannina Facio	
O C T O B E R	10	City of Ember	20th Century Fox / Walden Media / Playtone	Gil Kenan (director); Caroline Thompson (screenplay); Saoirse Ronan, Harry Treadaway, Bill Murray, Martin Landau, Mary Kay Place, Toby Jones, Tim Robbins, Marianne Jean-Baptiste, Liz Smith, Amy Quinn, Catherine Quinn, Mackenzie Crook, Lucinda Dryzek, Matt Jessup, Simon Kunz, Ian McElhinney	
O C T O B E R	10	The Express: The Ernie Davis Story	Universal Pictures / Relativity Media	Gary Fleder (director); Charles Leavitt (screenplay); Dennis Quaid, Rob Brown, Omar Benson Miller, Aunjanue Ellis, Clancy Brown, Darrin Dewitt Henson, Saul Rubinek, Nelsan Ellis, Charles S. Dutton, Geoff Stults, Evan Jones, Nicole Beharie, Chelcie Ross, Enver Gjokaj, Maximilian Osinski, Chadwick Boseman	
O C T O B E R	10	Happy-Go-Lucky	Miramax Films	Mike Leigh (director/screenplay); Sally Hawkins, Eddie Marsan, Alexis Zegerman, Andrea Riseborough, Sinead Matthews, Sylvestra Le Touzel, Joseph Kloska, Samuel Roukin. Caroline Martin, Oliver Maltman, Nonso Anozie, Karina Fernandez	
O C T O B E R	10	Quarantine	Screen Gems	John Erick Dowdle (director/screenplay); Drew Dowdle (screenplay); Jennifer Carpenter, Steve Harris, Jay Hernandez, Johnathon Schaech, Columbus Short, Andrew Fiscella, Rade Serbedzija, Greg Germann, Bernard White, Dania Ramirez, Marin Hinkle, Joey King, Jermaine Jackson, Denis O'Hare, Jeannie Epper, Doug Jones, Elaine Kagan, Sharon Ferguson, Stacy Chbosky	
O C T O B E R	17	The Elephant King	Unison Films	Seth Grossman (director/screenplay); Tate Ellington, Jonno Roberts, Florence Faivre, Ellen Burstyn, Josef Sommer	
O C T O B E R	17	Max Payne	20th Century Fox	John Moore (director); Beau Thorne (screenplay); Mark Wahlberg, Mila Kunis, Beau Bridges, Chris 'Ludacris' Bridges, Chris O'Donnell, Nelly Furtado, Donal Logue, Kate Burton, Donal Logue, Amaury Nolasco, Olga Kurylenko, Joel Gordon, Jamie Hector, Stephen R. Hart, James McCaffrey, Marianthi Evans	
O C T O B E R	17	Morning Light	Walt Disney Pictures	Mark Monroe (director); Chris Branning, Graham Brant-Zawadzki, Chris Clark, Charlie Enright, Jesse Fielding, Robbie Kane, Steve Manson, Chris Schubert, Kate Theisen, Mark Towill, Genny Tulloch, Piet van Os, Chris Welch, Kit Will, Jeremy Wilmot	
O C T O B E R	17	The Secret Life of Bees	Fox Searchlight Pictures / Overbrook Entertainment	Gina Prince-Bythewood (director/screenplay); Queen Latifah, Dakota Fanning, Jennifer Hudson, Alicia Keys, Sophie Okonedo, Paul Bettany, Hilarie Burton, Tristan Wilds, Nate Parker, Shondrella Avery, Emily Alyn Lind, Emma Sage Bowman, Addy Miller	
O C T O B E R	17	Sex Drive	Summit Entertainment	Sean Anders (director/screenplay); John Morris (screenplay); Josh Zuckerman, Amanda Crew, Clark Duke, Seth Green, James Marsden, Katrina Bowden, Alice Greczyn, Michael Cudlitz, David Koechner, Dave Sheridan, Mark L. Young, Charlie McDermott, Andrea Anders, Kim Ostrenko, Brett Rice, Brian Posehn, John Ross Bowie, Kyle Gass, Fall Out Boy, Cole Petersen, Allison Weissman, José Duarte, Susie Abromeit, Sasha Ramos, Jessica Just, Caley Hayes	
O C T O B E R	17	W.	Lionsgate	Oliver Stone (director); Stanley Weiser (screenplay); Josh Brolin, Elizabeth Banks, James Cromwell, Ellen Burstyn, Richard Dreyfuss, Toby Jones, Thandie Newton, Jeffrey Wright, Scott Glenn, Bruce McGill, Jennifer Sipes, Noah Wyle, Rob Corddry, Ioan Gruffudd, Dennis Boutsikaris, Randall Newsome, Jason Ritter, Michael Gaston, Tom Kemp, Paul Rae, Stacy Keach, Jesse Bradford, Marley Shelton, Anne Pressly, Sayed Badreya, William Chan, Teresa Cheung, Colin Hanks, Bryan Massey, Brent Sexton, Randal Reeder	
O C T O B E R	17	What Just Happened	Magnolia Pictures	Barry Levinson (director); Art Linson (screenplay); Robert De Niro, Sean Penn, Catherine Keener, Stanley Tucci, John Turturro, Robin Wright Penn, Moon Bloodgood, Kristen Stewart, Michael Wincott, Bruce Willis, Christopher Evan Welch, Lily Rabe	
O C T O B E R	24	Changeling	Universal Pictures / Imagine Entertainment	Clint Eastwood (director); J. Michael Straczynski (screenplay); Angelina Jolie, John Malkovich, Jeffrey Donovan, Michael Kelly, Colm Feore, Jason Butler Harner, Eddie Alderson, Amy Ryan, Geoff Pierson, Denis O'Hare, Frank Wood, Peter Gerety, Reed Birney, Gattlin Griffith, Jim Cantafio	
O C T O B E R	24	High School Musical 3: Senior Year	Walt Disney Pictures	Kenny Ortega (director); Peter Barsocchini (screenplay); Zac Efron, Vanessa Hudgens, Lucas Grabeel, Ashley Tisdale, Corbin Bleu, Monique Coleman, Bart Johnson, Alyson Reed, Olesya Rulin, Chris Warren Jr., Ryne Sanborn, Kaycee Stroh, Leslie Wing Pomeroy, Joey Miyashima, Jemma McKenzie-Brown, Matt Prokop, Robert Curtis Brown, Jessica Tuck, David Reivers, Manly "Little Pickles" Ortega, Socorro Herrera, Dave Fox, Justin Martin, Yolanda Wood, Jeremy Banks, Todd Snyder, Tara Starling, Stan Ellsworth	
O C T O B E R	24	Passengers	TriStar Pictures / Mandate Pictures	Rodrigo García (director); Ronnie Christensen (screenplay); Anne Hathaway, Patrick Wilson, Clea DuVall, Andre Braugher, Chelah Horsdal, David Morse, Dianne Wiest, William B. Davis, Ryan Robbins, Don Thompson, Stacy Grant, Brad Turner, Claire Smithies	
O C T O B E R	24	Pride and Glory	New Line Cinema	Gavin O'Connor (director/screenplay); Joe Carnahan (screenplay); Edward Norton, Colin Farrell, Jon Voight, Noah Emmerich, Jennifer Ehle, John Ortiz, Shea Whigham, Frank Grillo, Lake Bell, Rick Gonzalez, Wayne Duvall, Carmen Ejogo, Ramón Rodríguez, Manny Perez, Leslie Denniston, Hannah Riggins, Carmen LoPorto, Lucy Grace Ellis, Ryan Simpkins, Ty Simpkins, Maximiliano Hernández	
O C T O B E R	24	Saw V	Lionsgate / Twisted Pictures	David Hackl (director); Patrick Melton, Marcus Dunstan (screenplay); Scott Patterson, Costas Mandylor, Tobin Bell, Betsy Russell, Mark Rolston, Julie Benz, Meagan Good, Carlo Rota, Greg Bryk, Joris Jarsky, Al Sapienza, Niamh Wilson, Tony Nappo, Donnie Wahlberg, Laura Gordon, Mike Realba, Mike Butters, Samantha Lemole, Sarah Power, Tim Burd	
O C T O B E R	24	Synecdoche, New York	Sony Pictures Classics / Sidney Kimmel Entertainment	Charlie Kaufman (director/screenplay); Philip Seymour Hoffman, Samantha Morton, Michelle Williams, Catherine Keener, Emily Watson, Dianne Wiest, Jennifer Jason Leigh, Hope Davis, Tom Noonan, Sadie Goldstein, Robin Weigert, Deirdre O'Connell, Jerry Adler, Lynn Cohen, Josh Pais, Daniel London, Stephen Adly Guirgis, Amy Wright, Paul Sparks, John Rothman, Frank Wood, Elizabeth Marvel, Daisy Tahan, Cliff Carpenter, Amy Spanger, Nick Wyman, Dan Ziskie, Rosemary Murphy, Tim Guinee, Joe Lisi, Alice Drummond, Michael Higgins, Christopher Evan Welch, Peter Friedman	
O C T O B E R	28	Tinker Bell	Walt Disney Pictures / DisneyToon Studios / Buena Vista Home Entertainment	Bradley Raymond (director); Jeffrey M. Howard (screenplay); Mae Whitman, Kristin Chenoweth, Raven-Symoné, Lucy Liu, America Ferrera, Jane Horrocks, Jesse McCartney, Jeff Bennett, Rob Paulsen, Pamela Adlon, Anjelica Huston, Loreena McKennitt, Steve Valentine, Kathy Najimy, Richard Portnow, Gail Borges, America Young, Kat Cressida, Bob Bergen	
O C T O B E R	30	Immigrants	Hungaricom / Grand Allure Entertainment	Gábor Csupó (director/producer); Hank Azaria, Eric McCormack	
O C T O B E R	31	The Haunting of Molly Hartley	Freestyle Releasing	Mickey Liddell (director); Rebecca Sonnenshine, John Travis (screenplay); Haley Bennett, Chace Crawford, AnnaLynne McCord, Shannon Woodward, Jake Weber, Shanna Collins, Marin Hinkle, Nina Siemaszko, Josh Stewart, Jessica Lowndes, Randy Wayne, Jamie McShane, Ron Canada, Kevin Cooney, Ross Thomas, Charles Chun, John Newton	
O C T O B E R	31	The Other End of the Line	Metro-Goldwyn-Mayer / Hyde Park Entertainment	James Dodson (director); Tracey Jackson (screenplay); Jesse Metcalfe, Shriya Saran, Anupam Kher, Tara Sharma, Larry Miller, Sara Foster, Resh Ballam, Nouva Monika Wahlgren, Sushmita Mukherjee, Jai Thade, Kiran Juneja, Suhita Thatte, Ali Fazal	
O C T O B E R	31	RocknRolla	Warner Bros. Pictures	Guy Ritchie (director/screenplay); Gerard Butler, Tom Wilkinson, Thandie Newton, Mark Strong, Idris Elba, Tom Hardy, Toby Kebbell, Jeremy Piven, Chris 'Ludacris' Bridges, Karel Roden, Dragan Mićanović, David Bark-Jones, Matt King, Geoff Bell, Gemma Arterton, Jimi Mistry, Nonso Anozie, David Leon, Bronson Webb, Michael Ryan, Jamie Campbell Bower, Tiffany Mulheron, Robert Stone	
O C T O B E R	31	Zack and Miri Make a Porno	The Weinstein Company	Kevin Smith (director/screenplay); Seth Rogen, Elizabeth Banks, Craig Robinson, Jason Mewes, Traci Lords, Jeff Anderson, Katie Morgan, Ricky Mabe, Justin Long, Brandon Routh, Tyler Labine, Tisha Campbell-Martin, Tom Savini, Jennifer Schwalbach, Gerry Bednob, Kenny Hotz, David Early	
N O V E M B E R	7	The Boy in the Striped Pajamas	Miramax Films	Mark Herman (director/screenplay); Vera Farmiga, David Thewlis, Rupert Friend, David Hayman, Asa Butterfield, Jack Scanlon, Amber Beattie, Sheila Hancock, Richard Johnson, Cara Horgan, Jim Norton	
N O V E M B E R	7	Madagascar: Escape 2 Africa	Paramount Pictures / DreamWorks Animation / PDI/DreamWorks	Eric Darnell, Tom McGrath (directors/screenplay); Etan Cohen (screenplay); Ben Stiller, Chris Rock, David Schwimmer, Jada Pinkett Smith, Sacha Baron Cohen, Cedric the Entertainer, Andy Richter, Bernie Mac, Alec Baldwin, Sherri Shepherd, will.i.am, Elisa Gabrielli, Tom McGrath, Chris Miller, Christopher Knights, John DiMaggio, Conrad Vernon, Fred Tatasciore, Eric Darnell, Willow Smith, Zachary Gordon, Meredith Vieira, Lesley Stahl, Al Roker, David Soren, Phil LaMarr, Edie Mirman, Stacy Ferguson, Harland Williams, Danny Jacobs, Bridget Hoffman, Richard Horvitz	
N O V E M B E R	7	Repo! The Genetic Opera	Lionsgate	Darren Lynn Bousman (director); Terrance Zdunich, Darren Smith (screenplay); Alexa Vega, Anthony Stewart Head, Sarah Brightman, Paris Hilton, Ogre, Terrance Zdunich, Bill Moseley, Paul Sorvino, Sarah Power, Nancy Long, Joan Jett, Dean Armstrong, Darren Smith, J. LaRose	
N O V E M B E R	7	Role Models	Universal Pictures / Relativity Media	David Wain (director/screenplay); Paul Rudd, Ken Marino, Timothy Dowling (screenplay); Seann William Scott, Paul Rudd, Christopher Mintz-Plasse, Bobb'e J. Thompson, Elizabeth Banks, Jane Lynch, Ken Jeong, Kerri Kenney-Silver, Ken Marino, Nicole Randall Johnson, A.D. Miles, Joe Lo Truglio, Vincent Martella, Matt Walsh, Jessica Morris, Carly Craig, Keegan-Michael Key, Amanda Righetti, Jorma Taccone, Armen Weitzman, Louis C.K., Allie Stamler, Elijah Polanco, Nate Hartley	
N O V E M B E R	7	Soul Men	Metro-Goldwyn-Mayer / Dimension Films	Malcolm D. Lee (director); Robert Ramsey, Matthew Stone (screenplay); Samuel L. Jackson, Bernie Mac, Sharon Leal, Sean Hayes, Affion Crockett, Adam Herschman, Fatso-Fasano, Jackie Long, John Legend, Jennifer Coolidge, Isaac Hayes, Mike Epps, Millie Jackson, Sara Erikson, Vanessa del Rio, Randy Jackson	
N O V E M B E R	11	Animal Husbandry	ARM/Cinema 25	Andrew Repasky McElhinney (director/producer); Christian Pedersen, Kristina Valada-Viars, Charlotte Ford, Jeb Kreager, Frank X, Tobias Segal, James Laster	
N O V E M B E R	12	Slumdog Millionaire	Fox Searchlight Pictures	Danny Boyle (director); Simon Beaufoy (screenplay); Dev Patel, Freida Pinto, Madhur Mittal, Irrfan Khan, Anil Kapoor, Saurabh Shukla, Mahesh Manjrekar, Ankur Vikal, Rajendranath Zutshi, Sanchita Choudhary, Mia Drake Inderbitzin, Siddhesh Patil, Shruti Seth, Arfi Lamba, Ayush Mahesh Khedekar, Tanay Chheda, Rubina Ali, Tanvi Ganesh Lonkar, Azharuddin Mohammed Ismail, Ashutosh Lobo Gajiwala	
N O V E M B E R	14	Quantum of Solace	Metro-Goldwyn-Mayer / Columbia Pictures / Eon Productions	Marc Forster (director); Paul Haggis, Neal Purvis, Robert Wade (screenplay); Daniel Craig, Olga Kurylenko, Mathieu Amalric, Gemma Arterton, Giancarlo Giannini, Jeffrey Wright, Judi Dench, Anatole Taubman, David Harbour, Joaquín Cosío, Fernando Guillén Cuervo, Jesper Christensen, Rory Kinnear, Paul Ritter, Tim Pigott-Smith, Neil Jackson, Simon Kassianides, Stana Katic, Oona Chaplin, Lucrezia Lante della Rovere, Elizabeth Arciniega, Guillermo del Toro, Alfonso Cuarón, Glenn Foster	
N O V E M B E R	21	Bolt	Walt Disney Pictures / Walt Disney Animation Studios	Chris Williams (director/screenplay); Byron Howard (director); Dan Fogelman (screenplay); John Travolta, Miley Cyrus, Susie Essman, Mark Walton, Malcolm McDowell, Nick Swardson, Diedrich Bader, Greg Germann, James Lipton, "Macho Man" Randy Savage, Kari Wahlgren, Chloë Grace Moretz, J.P. Manoux, Ronn Moss, Grey DeLisle, Tim Mertens, Brian Stepanek, Jeff Bennett, Daran Norris, John DiMaggio, Jenny Lewis, Stephen Anderson, Phil LaMarr, Anne Lockhart, Scott Menville, Paul Pape, Tara Strong, Joe Whyte, Chris Williams	
N O V E M B E R	21	Lake City	Screen Media Films	Perry Moore, Hunter Hill (directors/screenplay); Sissy Spacek, Troy Garity, Rebecca Romijn, Dave Matthews, Colin Ford, Drea de Matteo, Keith Carradine, Jason Davis, Jeff Wincott	
N O V E M B E R	21	Special	Magnolia Pictures	Hal Haberman, Jeremy Passmore (directors/screenplay); Michael Rapaport, Paul Blackthorne, Josh Peck, Robert Baker, Jack Kehler, Alexandra Holden, Michelle Vieth, Francisco Gattorno, Cesar Evora, Manuel Ojeda, Ian Bohen, Christopher Darga, Michael Shamus Wiles	
N O V E M B E R	21	Twilight	Summit Entertainment	Catherine Hardwicke (director); Melissa Rosenberg (screenplay); Kristen Stewart, Robert Pattinson, Taylor Lautner, Billy Burke, Peter Facinelli, Elizabeth Reaser, Ashley Greene, Kellan Lutz, Nikki Reed, Jackson Rathbone, Cam Gigandet, Rachelle Lefevre, Edi Gathegi, Sarah Clarke, Christian Serratos, Michael Welch, Anna Kendrick, Gregory Tyree Boyce, Justin Chon, Gil Birmingham, José Zúñiga, Ned Bellamy, Solomon Trimble, Krys Hyatt, Matt Bushell, Ayanna Berkshire, Katie Powers, Trish Egan	
N O V E M B E R	26	Australia	20th Century Fox	Baz Luhrmann (director/screenplay); Ronald Harwood, Stuart Beattie, Richard Flanagan (screenplay); Nicole Kidman, Hugh Jackman, David Wenham, Bryan Brown, Jack Thompson, David Gulpilil, Brandon Walters, David Ngoombujarra, Ben Mendelsohn, Essie Davis, Barry Otto, Kerry Walker, Sandy Gore, Ursula Yovich, Yuen Wah, Jacek Koman, Tony Barry, Ray Barrett, Max Cullen, Arthur Dignam, Lillian Crombie, Angus Pilakui, Matthew Whittet	
N O V E M B E R	26	Four Christmases	New Line Cinema / Spyglass Entertainment	Seth Gordon (director); Matt R. Allen, Caleb Wilson, Jon Lucas, Scott Moore (screenplay); Vince Vaughn, Reese Witherspoon, Robert Duvall, Jon Favreau, Mary Steenburgen, Dwight Yoakam, Tim McGraw, Kristin Chenoweth, Jon Voight, Sissy Spacek, Katy Mixon, Carol Kane, Colleen Camp, Jack Donner, Steve Wiebe, Skyler Gisondo, Patrick Van Horn, Brian Baumgartner, Cedric Yarbrough, Peter Billingsley, Haley Hallak, True Bella Pinci	
N O V E M B E R	26	Milk	Focus Features	Gus Van Sant (director); Dustin Lance Black (screenplay); Sean Penn, Emile Hirsch, Josh Brolin, Diego Luna, James Franco, Alison Pill, Victor Garber, Denis O'Hare, Joseph Cross, Stephen Spinella, Lucas Grabeel, Jeff Koons, Steven Wiig, Kelvin Han Yee, Howard Rosenman, Ted Jan Roberts, Brent Corrigan, Dave Franco, Dustin Lance Black, Frank M. Robinson, Tom Ammiano, Carol Ruth Silver, Cleve Jones, Ashlee Temple, Wendy Tremont King, Robert Chimento, Zachary Culbertson, Allan Baird, Mark Martinez	
D E C E M B E R	5	Cadillac Records	TriStar Pictures / Sony Music Entertainment / Parkwood Entertainment	Darnell Martin (director/screenplay); Adrien Brody, Jeffrey Wright, Beyoncé Knowles, Cedric the Entertainer, Gabrielle Union, Columbus Short, Emmanuelle Chriqui, Eamonn Walker, Mos Def, Shiloh Fernandez, Jay O. Sanders, Eric Bogosian, Kevin Mambo, Marc Bonan, Tammy Blanchard, Q-Tip, Norman Reedus, Isiah Whitlock Jr., Vincent D'Onofrio, Elvis Presley	
D E C E M B E R	5	Extreme Movie	Dimension Films	Adam Jay Epstein, Andrew Jacobson (directors/screenplay); Will Forte, Phil Lord, Christopher Miller, Andy Samberg, Akiva Schaffer, John Solomon, Jorma Taccone, Erica Rivinoja (screenplay); Michael Cera, Ryan Pinkston, Jamie Kennedy, Frankie Muniz, Matthew Lillard, Rob Pinkston, Ben Feldman, Kevin Hart, Vanessa Lee Chester, Jermaine Williams, Danneel Harris, Heather Hogan, Rheagan Wallace, Andy Milonakis, John P. Farley, Cherilyn Wilson, Rich Ceraulo, Robert John Burke, Chris Cooper, Hank Harris, Denise Boutte, Jeremy Suarez, Kyle Howard, Shorty Rossi, Jake Sandvig, Nicholas D'Agosto, Marcus T. Paulk, Steven Christopher Parker, Joanna García, Beverley Mitchell, Vanessa Lengies, Anthony Molinari, Ashley Schneider, Jim Ford, Ed Trotta, Kyle Gass, Jeffrey Corazzini, Stanton Barrett, Henry Kingi, Dan Finnerty, Bobbi Sue Luther	
D E C E M B E R	5	Frost/Nixon	Universal Pictures / Imagine Entertainment / Working Title Films / StudioCanal /	Ron Howard (director); Peter Morgan (screenplay); Frank Langella, Michael Sheen, Kevin Bacon, Oliver Platt, Sam Rockwell, Matthew Macfadyen, Toby Jones, Rebecca Hall, Patty McCormack, Andy Milder, Keith MacKechnie, Clint Howard, Rance Howard, Jim Meskimen, Kaine Bennett Charleston, Gabriel Jarret, Kate Jennings Grant, Geoffrey Blake, Gavin Grazer, Tricia Nixon Cox, Michael York, Hugh Hefner, Gene Boyer, Raymond Price, Ken Khachigian, Sue Mengers, Jay White	
D E C E M B E R	5	Nobel Son	Freestyle Releasing	Randall Miller (director/screenplay); Jody Savin (screenplay); Alan Rickman, Bryan Greenberg, Shawn Hatosy, Mary Steenburgen, Bill Pullman, Eliza Dushku, Danny DeVito, Ted Danson, Tracey Walter, Ernie Hudson	
D E C E M B E R	5	Punisher: War Zone	Lionsgate / Marvel Knights	Lexi Alexander (director); Art Marcum, Matt Holloway, Nick Santora (screenplay); Ray Stevenson, Dominic West, Julie Benz, Wayne Knight, Dash Mihok, Colin Salmon, Doug Hutchison, Romano Orzari, Stephanie Janusauskas, Larry Day, Ron Lea, T. J. Storm, Bjanka Murgel, Mark Camacho, Keram Malicki-Sánchez, Carlos Gonzalez-Vio, David Vadim, Aubert Pallascio	
D E C E M B E R	10	The Reader	Metro-Goldwyn-Mayer / The Weinstein Company / Mirage Enterprises	Stephen Daldry (director); David Hare (screenplay); Kate Winslet, Ralph Fiennes, David Kross, Bruno Ganz, Alexandra Maria Lara, Lena Olin, Vijessna Ferkic, Karoline Herfurth, Burghart Klaußner, Linda Bassett, Hannah Herzsprung, Jeanette Hain, Susanne Lothar, Matthias Habich, Florian Bartholomäi, Alissa Wilms, Sylvester Groth, Fabian Busch, Volker Bruch	
D E C E M B E R	10	Wendy and Lucy	Oscilloscope Pictures	Kelly Reichardt (director/screenplay); Jon Raymond (screenplay); Michelle Williams, Will Patton, Will Oldham, John Robinson, Larry Fessenden, Deirdre O'Connell, Walter Dalton	
D E C E M B E R	12	Che	IFC Films	Steven Soderbergh (director); Peter Buchman, Benjamin A. van der Veen, Terrence Malick (screenplay); Benicio del Toro, Rodrigo Santoro, Catalina Sandino Moreno, Franka Potente, Julia Ormond, Lou Diamond Phillips, Demián Bichir, Santiago Cabrera, Vladimir Cruz, Jorge Perugorría, Benjamín Benítez, Édgar Ramírez, Armando Riesco, Néstor Rodulfo, Jsu Garcia, Elvira Mínguez, Alfredo De Quesada, Sam Robards, Victor Rasuk, Unax Ugalde, Pedro Telemaco, Stephen Mailer, Oscar Isaac, Gastón Pauls, Joaquim de Almeida, Yul Vazquez, Marc-André Grondin, Eduard Fernández, Cristian Mercado, Jordi Mollà, Óscar Jaenada, Rubén Ochandiano, Antonio de la Torre, Juan Carlos Vellido, Mark Umbers, David Selvas, Enrique Arce, Matt Damon, Roberto Luis Santana, Kahlil Mendez, Marise Álvarez, Andrés Manuel Munar, Othello Rensoli, Norman Santiago, Jay Potter, Jon De Vries, Joksan Ramos, Javier Ortiz, Michael Countryman, Pablo Durán, Ezequiel Díaz, Carlos Acosta-Milian, Aaron Vega, Roberto San Martin, James D. Dever, Pedro Casablanc, Tomás del Estal, Giraldo Moisés, Cristhian Esquivel	
D E C E M B E R	12	Dark Streets	Samuel Goldwyn Films	Rachel Samuels (director); Wallace King (screenplay); Bijou Phillips, Gabriel Mann, Izabella Miko, Elias Koteas, Michael Fairman, Toledo Diamond	
D E C E M B E R	12	The Day the Earth Stood Still	20th Century Fox	Scott Derrickson (director); David Scarpa (screenplay); Keanu Reeves, Jennifer Connelly, Kathy Bates, Jaden Smith, Jon Hamm, John Cleese, Kyle Chandler, Robert Knepper, James Hong, John Rothman, Sunita Prasad, Mousa Kraish, J.C. MacKenzie, Lorena Gale, Patrick Sabongui, Jake McLaughlin, Roger Cross, Heather Doerksen, Hiro Kanagawa, Ken Kirzinger, Blair Redford, Brandon T. Jackson, Ty Olsson	
D E C E M B E R	12	Delgo	Freestyle Releasing	Marc F. Adler, Jason Maurer (directors); Patrick J. Cowan, Carl Dream, Jennifer A. Jones (screenplay); Freddie Prinze Jr., Jennifer Love Hewitt, Anne Bancroft, Chris Kattan, Michael Clarke Duncan, Louis Gossett Jr., Eric Idle, Val Kilmer, Malcolm McDowell, Burt Reynolds, Kelly Ripa, Kelly Clarkson, John Vernon, Melissa McBride, Armin Shimerman, Tristan Rogers, Mary Matilyn Mouser, Nika Futterman, Susan Bennett, Sally Kellerman, Zlatan Ibrahimovic, Brad Abrell, David Heyer, Jed Rhein, Jeff Winter, Don Stallings, Gustavo Rex, Louis K. Adler, William R. Dean	
D E C E M B E R	12	Doubt	Miramax Films	John Patrick Shanley (director/screenplay); Meryl Streep, Philip Seymour Hoffman, Amy Adams, Viola Davis, Alice Drummond, Audrie J. Neenan, Susan Blommaert, Carrie Preston, John Costelloe, Paulie Litt, Lydia Jordan, Helen Stenborg, Margery Beddow, Marylouise Burke, Lloyd Clay Brown, Joseph Foster, Mike Roukis, Frank Shanley, Frank Dolce, Matthew Marvin, Bridget Clark, Molly Chiffer, Jack O'Connell	
D E C E M B E R	12	Gran Torino	Warner Bros. Pictures / Village Roadshow Pictures	Clint Eastwood (director); Nick Schenk (screenplay); Clint Eastwood, Christopher Carley, Bee Vang, Ahney Her, Brian Haley, Geraldine Hughes, Dreama Walker, Brian Howe, John Carroll Lynch, Scott Eastwood, Doua Moua, John Johns, Cory Hardrict, William Hill, Brooke Chia Thao, Chee Thao, Choua Kue, Xia Soua Chang, Sonny Vue, Davis Gloff, Tom Mahard, Nana Gbewonyo, Arthur Cartwright, Austin Douglas Smith, Conor Liam Callaghan, Michael E. Kurowski, Julia Ho, Maykao K. Lytongpao	
D E C E M B E R	12	Nothing like the Holidays	Overture Films	Alfredo De Villa (director); Rick Najera, Ted Perkins, Alison Swan (screenplay); Luis Guzmán, John Leguizamo, Debra Messing, Alfred Molina, Freddy Rodriguez, Melonie Diaz, Vanessa Ferlito, Jay Hernandez, Elizabeth Peña, Jessica Camacho	
D E C E M B E R	12	Timecrimes	Magnolia Pictures	Nacho Vigalondo (director/screenplay); Karra Elejalde, Nacho Vigalondo, Candela Fernández, Bárbara Goenaga, Juan Inciarte	
D E C E M B E R	12	Where God Left His Shoes	IFC Films	Salvatore Stabile (director/screenplay); John Leguizamo, Leonor Varela, Samantha Rose, Jerry Ferrara, Adriane Lenox, Charles Dumas, Sakina Jaffrey, Chance Kelly, Manny Perez, Frank Rodriguez	
D E C E M B E R	12	While She Was Out	Anchor Bay Entertainment	Susan Montford (director/screenplay); Kim Basinger, Lukas Haas, Craig Sheffer, Rachel Hayward, Jamie Starr, Leonard Wu, Luis Chávez, Luke Gair, Erika-Shaye Gair	
D E C E M B E R	17	The Wrestler	Fox Searchlight Pictures	Darren Aronofsky (director); Robert Siegel (screenplay); Mickey Rourke, Marisa Tomei, Evan Rachel Wood, Mark Margolis, Todd Barry, Judah Friedlander, Ernest Miller, Ajay Naidu, John D'Leo, Robert Siegel, Johnny Valiant, Robbie E., Necro Butcher, Nick Berk, The Blue Meanie, Sabian, Ron Killings, L.A. Smooth, Jay Lethal, Jim Powers, Claudio Castagnoli, Larry Sweeney, Romeo Roselli, John Zandig, Chuck Taylor, Nigel McGuinness, D. J. Hyde, Kit Cope, Wass Stevens, Gregg Bello, Scott Siegel, Maurizio Ferrigno, Donnetta Lavinia Grays, Andrea Langi, Andrew Anderson, Nate Hatred, Pappadon, Jay Santana	
D E C E M B E R	19	Nothing but the Truth	Freestyle Releasing	Rod Lurie (director/screenplay); Kate Beckinsale, Matt Dillon, Angela Bassett, Alan Alda, Vera Farmiga, David Schwimmer, Noah Wyle, Floyd Abrams, Preston Bailey, Rod Lurie	
D E C E M B E R	19	Seven Pounds	Columbia Pictures / Relativity Media / Overbrook Entertainment / Escape Artists	Gabriele Muccino (director); Grant Nieporte (screenplay); Will Smith, Rosario Dawson, Woody Harrelson, Michael Ealy, Barry Pepper, Elpidia Carrillo, Robinne Lee, Joe Nunez, Bill Smitrovich, Tim Kelleher, Gina Hecht, Andy Milder, Judyann Elder, Sarah Jane Morris, Madison Pettis, Octavia Spencer, Ivan Angulo, Audrey Wasilewski, Sonya Eddy, Dale Raoul, Kevin Cooney, Quintin Kelly, Skylan Brooks, Bryce J. Harris, Bradly J. Harris, Weston Harris, Biz Markie	
D E C E M B E R	19	The Tale of Despereaux	Universal Pictures / Relativity Media	Sam Fell, Robert Stevenhagen (directors); Gary Ross (screenplay); Matthew Broderick, Dustin Hoffman, Emma Watson, Tracey Ullman, Kevin Kline, William H. Macy, Stanley Tucci, Ciarán Hinds, Robbie Coltrane, Tony Hale, Frances Conroy, Frank Langella, Richard Jenkins, Christopher Lloyd, Charles Shaughnessy, Sigourney Weaver, Sam Fell, Bronson Pinchot, Robin Atkin Downes, Daniel Riordan, Patricia Cullen, Jane Karen, McNally Sagal, Gary Dunn, Georgina Cordova, Belinda	
D E C E M B E R	19	Yes Man	Warner Bros. Pictures / Village Roadshow Pictures / The Zanuck Company / Heyday Films	Peyton Reed (director); Nicholas Stoller, Jarrad Paul, Andrew Mogel (screenplay); Jim Carrey, Zooey Deschanel, Bradley Cooper, John Michael Higgins, Rhys Darby, Danny Masterson, Fionnula Flanagan, Terence Stamp, Sasha Alexander, Molly Sims, Rocky Carroll, Spencer Garrett, Sean O'Bryan, Patrick Labyorteaux, Brent Briscoe, Maile Flanagan, Jarrad Paul, Aaron Takahashi, Vivian Bang, Mary-Pat Green, Luis Guzmán, Danny Wallace, John Cothran, Arne Starr	
D E C E M B E R	25	Bedtime Stories	Walt Disney Pictures	Adam Shankman (director); Matt Lopez, Tim Herlihy (screenplay); Adam Sandler, Keri Russell, Guy Pearce, Russell Brand, Richard Griffiths, Teresa Palmer, Lucy Lawless, Courteney Cox, Aisha Tyler, Jonathan Pryce, Jonathan Morgan Heit, Laura Ann Kesling, Nick Swardson, Kathryn Joosten, Allen Covert, Carmen Electra, Sarah Buxton, Blake Clark, Paul Dooley, Mikey Post, Debbie Lee Carrington, Annalise Basso, Jonathan Loughran, Rob Schneider, Heather Morris, Arne Starr	
D E C E M B E R	25	The Curious Case of Benjamin Button	Paramount Pictures / Warner Bros. Pictures / The Kennedy/Marshall Company	David Fincher (director); Eric Roth (screenplay); Brad Pitt, Cate Blanchett, Taraji P. Henson, Julia Ormond, Jason Flemyng, Elias Koteas, Tilda Swinton, Jared Harris, Mahershalalhashbaz Ali, Jared Harris, Faune A. Chambers, Ed Metzger, Patrick Thomas O'Brien, Lance E. Nichols, Phyllis Somerville, Don Creech, Josh Stewart, Ilia Volok, Louis Herthum, Joel Bissonnette, Bianca Chiminello, Robert Towers, Tom Everett, Spencer Daniels, Chandler Canterbury, Elle Fanning, Madisen Beaty	
D E C E M B E R	25	Last Chance Harvey	Overture Films	Joel Hopkins (director/screenplay); Dustin Hoffman, Emma Thompson, Eileen Atkins, Kathy Baker, James Brolin, Liane Balaban, Richard Schiff, Timothy Howar, Wendy Mae Brown, Bronagh Gallagher, Jeremy Sheffield, Daniel Lapaine, Patrick Baladi, Adam James, Michael Landes, Jamie Sives, Kate Harper, Angela Griffin, Alex Avery, Tim Ahern, Charlotte Lucas	
D E C E M B E R	25	Marley & Me	20th Century Fox / Fox 2000 Pictures / Regency Enterprises	David Frankel (director); Scott Frank, Don Roos (screenplay); Owen Wilson, Jennifer Aniston, Eric Dane, Kathleen Turner, Alan Arkin, Nathan Gamble, Finley Jacobsen, Haley Bennett, Ann Dowd, Clarke Peters, Haley Hudson, Tom Irwin, Alec Mapa, Sandy Martin, Joyce Van Patten, Zabryna Guevara, Gloria Estefan, Emilio Estefan, Bryce Robinson, Dylan Henry, Ben Hyland, Lucy Merriam	
D E C E M B E R	25	The Spirit	Lionsgate	Frank Miller (director/screenplay); Gabriel Macht, Samuel L. Jackson, Scarlett Johansson, Eva Mendes, Sarah Paulson, Dan Lauria, Stana Katic, Louis Lombardi, Jaime King, Paz Vega, Frank Miller, Eric Balfour, Michael Milhoan, Richard Portnow, Paul Levitz, Johnny Simmons, Seychelle Gabriel	
D E C E M B E R	25	Valkyrie	Metro-Goldwyn-Mayer / United Artists	Bryan Singer (director); Christopher McQuarrie, Nathan Alexander (screenplay); Tom Cruise, Kenneth Branagh, Bill Nighy, Tom Wilkinson, Carice van Houten, Thomas Kretschmann, Terence Stamp, Eddie Izzard, Kevin McNally, Christian Berkel, Jamie Parker, David Bamber, Tom Hollander, David Schofield, Kenneth Cranham, Halina Reijn, Werner Daehn, Harvey Friedman, Matthias Freihof, Waldemar Kobus, Ian McNeice, Danny Webb, Chris Larkin, Christian Oliver, Bernard Hill, Julian Morris, Matthew Burton, Philipp von Schulthess, Helmut Stauss, Gerhard Haase-Hindenberg, Anton Algrang	
D E C E M B E R	25	Waltz with Bashir	Sony Pictures Classics	Ari Folman (director/screenplay); Ari Folman, Miki Leon, Ori Sivan, Yehezkel Lazarov, Ronny Dayag, Shmuel Frenkel, Zahava Solomon, Ron Ben-Yishai, Dror Harazi	
D E C E M B E R	26	Revolutionary Road	DreamWorks Pictures / Paramount Vantage / BBC Films	Sam Mendes (director); Justin Haythe (screenplay); Leonardo DiCaprio, Kate Winslet, Kathy Bates, Michael Shannon, Kathryn Hahn, David Harbour, Richard Easton, Dylan Baker, Zoe Kazan, Jay O. Sanders, Max Casella, Ryan Simpkins, Ty Simpkins, Kristen Connolly, John Behlmann	
D E C E M B E R	31	Defiance	Paramount Vantage	Edward Zwick (director/screenplay); Clayton Frohman (screenplay); Daniel Craig, Liev Schreiber, Jamie Bell, George MacKay, Alexa Davalos, Allan Corduner, Mark Feuerstein, Mia Wasikowska, Tomas Arana, Jacek Koman, Iben Hjejle, Mark Margolis, Jodhi May, Kate Fahy, Iddo Goldberg, Sam Spruell, Ravil Isyanov, Martin Hancock, Jonjo O'Neill, Rolandas Boravskis	

== See also ==
- List of 2008 box office number-one films in the United States
- 2008 in the United States
