= The Derby Stallion =

- Directed by: Craig Clyde
- Written by: Kimberly Gough
- Produced by: Tonja Walker; Kevin Summerfield
- Starring: Zac Efron; Bill Cobbs; William R. Moses; Tonja Walker; Rob Pinkston; Crystal Hunt; Michael Nardelli; Colton James
- Cinematography: John Gunselman
- Music by: Billy Preston
- Production company: Tonja Walker Productions
- Distributed by: Echo Bridge Entertainment
- Release date: July 4, 2005
- Running time: 98 minutes
- Country: United States
- Language: English
- Budget: $750,000
- Box office: $4 million

The Derby Stallion is a 2005 independent film starring Zac Efron.

== Plot ==
Lonely Patrick McCardle (Zac Efron) is a 15-year-old who is forced to play baseball by his former baseball player dad (William R. Moses). Patrick doesn't know what to do with his life. He repeatedly skips ball practice and visits his friend Houston Jones (Bill Cobbs), a town outcast and former one-time champion steeplechase jockey. Houston dazzles Patrick with stories of when he was Patrick's age and in love with a rich white girl named Julie, who taught him to ride.

At a game, Patrick is distracted by his teammate Chuck's (Rob Pinkston) older sister Jill (Crystal Hunt) and Patrick is knocked out by the pitch. Patrick's father asks him about his fall, and Patrick confronts him about pushing him into baseball. Patrick visits Houston after the game, and Houston tells him more stories, about Julie's death when she told Houston she was going to marry him. Patrick feels sorry and asks Houston to train him to steeplechase. Houston agrees, but Patrick's parents are appalled when he asks them for permission. His mother thinks it is too dangerous, and his father is concerned about Patrick taking riding lessons from a drunk man. When they agree, Houston buys Patrick a horse named Rusty and tells Patrick to take care of him till he says to stop.

Patrick meets again with Chuck and Jill and asks them to join him at Houston's barbecue; he also invites his parents. There, his parents begin to trust Houston more. Patrick starts to learn to ride Rusty as Jill tends to Houston's garden. One day, the rich town bully and steeplechase champion, Randy, destroys Houston's vegetable/fruit stand: Houston warns him to stop. Houston then starts to collapse while Randy leaves and Patrick arrives. Jill calls 9-1-1, but Houston refuses to go to the hospital and dies the next day, leaving Patrick devastated. Patrick drops out of the steeplechase race and stops taking care of Rusty.

While walking around Houston's home on the day of the race, Jill finds a package addressed to Patrick with an envelope containing pictures of Patrick as a boy and a small carved horse figurine. She gives the package to Patrick: and he finds Houston's old racing silks and a letter. Patrick decides to enter the race and gets there just in time. Jill kisses Patrick before he leaves and sets up. Patrick, along with strong Rusty and Houston's voice in his head, wins the race. In the end, Patrick lays his trophy on Houston's grave, along with Houston's hat and his harmonica.

== Cast ==
- Bill Cobbs as Houston Jones
- Zac Efron as Patrick McCardle
- Crystal Hunt as Jill Overton
- William R. Moses as Jim McCardle
- Tonja Walker as Linda McCardle
- Rob Pinkston as Chuck Overton
- Colton James as Donald
- Michael Nardelli as Randy Adams
- Billy Preston as Will Gentry
- Isabella Davidson as Tammy McCardle
- Abrianna Davidson as Annie McCardle

== See also ==
- List of films about horses
- List of films about horse racing
