= Extreme Movie =

2008 film by Adam Jay Epstein and Andrew Jacobson

- DVD cover
- Directed by: Adam Jay Epstein; Andrew Jacobson
- Written by: Adam Jay Epstein; Will Forte; Andrew Jacobson; Phil Lord; Christopher Miller; Andy Samberg; Akiva Schaffer; John Solomon; Jorma Taccone; Erica Rivinoja
- Produced by: Laura Lichstein; Richard Suckle; Warren Zide
- Starring: Michael Cera; Ryan Pinkston; Jamie Kennedy; Frankie Muniz; Matthew Lillard
- Cinematography: Eric Haase
- Edited by: Bruce Green
- Music by: Todd Bozung
- Production companies: Blue Bally; FlipZide Pictures
- Distributed by: Dimension Extreme
- Release date: December 5, 2008
- Running time: 75 minutes
- Country: United States
- Language: English
- Budget: $1.2 million
- Box office: $81,338

Extreme Movie (known as Hotdogs & Doughnuts: An Extreme Movie in Australia) is a 2008 American satirical sex comedy film composed of sketches focusing on teen sex. Adam Jay Epstein and Andrew Jacobson direct, with segments co-written by Saturday Night Live performers Will Forte, Andy Samberg, and writers Akiva Schaffer, Jorma Taccone, Phil Lord and Christopher Miller. The ensemble cast includes Kevin Hart, Frankie Muniz, Ryan Pinkston, Jamie Kennedy, Danneel Harris, Andy Milonakis, Matthew Lillard, Rob Pinkston and Michael Cera.

== Plot ==
The film is a series of vignettes with Matthew Lillard's sex advice intercut within every couple segments. Mike tries to impress his crush, Stacy. Fred meets a girl online and they arrange for "menacing action", only for Fred to break into the wrong apartment. The promiscuous Betty going to the "next level" (kinkier and more outrageous sexual adventures) with Chuck, and later Fred. Justin buys a vibrating vagina and falls in love with it, all the time while crushing on another girl; the vibrating vagina has a personality of its own and commits "suicide" when Justin rejects it.

A Real Sex-esque skit where a girl admits to having sex with two black men on camera. Two guys, Barry and Leon, create a woman on their computer, only for her to run wild.

Jessica, in an attempt to become horny, puts her vibrating cell phone in her vagina, only for it to fall in. Len wakes up to find a girl and another guy in his bed, and his parents home as well; the whole thing turns out to be a hidden-camera bisexual show.

Sex education teacher Mr. Matthews teaches his class with no rules and a lot of embarrassment, usually centering on Mike. Ronny, obsessed with Abraham Lincoln, creates a time machine and travels back in time to have sex with Lincoln.

== Cast ==
- Kevin Hart as Barry
- Ryan Pinkston as Mike
- Jamie Kennedy as Mateus
- Frankie Muniz as Chuck
- Matthew Lillard as himself
- Rob Pinkston as Griffin
- Ben Feldman as Len
- Michael Cera as Fred
- Vanessa Chester as Charlotte
- Jermaine Williams as Leon
- Danneel Harris as Melissa
- Heather Hogan as Kat
- Rheagan Wallace as Jessica
- Andy Milonakis as Justin
- John P. Farley as Mr. Matthews
- Cherilyn Wilson as Stacy
- Rich Ceraulo as Angus
- Robert John Burke as FBI Agent Ben
- Chris Cooper as FBI Agent Mike
- Hank Harris as Ronny
- Denise Boutte as New Tabitha
- Jeremy Suarez as R.J.
- Kyle Howard as Drunk Girl's Boyfriend
- Shorty Rossi as Dwarf in Buttless Chaps
- Jake Sandvig as Hank
- Nicholas D'Agosto as Evan
- Marcus T. Paulk as Jalin / Wyatt
- Steven Christopher Parker as Doug
- Joanna García as Sweetie Pie
- Beverley Mitchell as Sue
- Vanessa Lengies as Carla
- Anthony Molinari as Boston PD Sergeant Brian
- Ashley Schneider as Betty
- Jim Ford as Boston PD Sergeant John
- Ed Trotta as Abraham Lincoln
- Kyle Gass as Porn Director
- Jeffrey Corazzini as Boston PD Officer Frank
- Stanton Barrett as Boston PD
- Henry Kingi as Dimitri
- Dan Finnerty as Gigundocock
- Bobbi Sue Luther as Gabriela

== Release ==
The film was theatrically released internationally by Dimension Films. In the United States, it received a straight-to-DVD release by Dimension Extreme on December 5, 2008, and filming in New York City, New York, Boston, Massachusetts and Los Angeles, California.

== Reception ==
Common Sense Media rated the film 1 out of 5 and called it "an extreme waste of time" and compares it unfavorably to Woody Allen's 1972 film Everything You Always Wanted to Know About Sex.
