= Ed Trotta =

American actor

Ed Trotta is an American actor, director and voice actor, best known for doing voice-over work for Blizzard Entertainment, including Tyrael in Diablo II and Diablo II: Lord of Destruction, and Malfurion Stormrage in Warcraft III Reign of Chaos (2002), The Frozen Throne (2003), World of Warcraft: Cataclysm (2010), Hearthstone, and Heroes of the Storm. He is also known for playing Abraham Lincoln in Extreme Movie, the play Two Miles A Penny, Liar Liar, Pump Up the Volume, and Star Trek: Voyager.
