= Rob Pinkston =

American actor (born 1988)

- Born: William Robert Pinkston IV; January 30, 1988 (age 38); Atlanta, Georgia, U.S.
- Occupation: Actor
- Years active: 2003–present
- Partner: Samira (2021–present)

External image
- Pinkston at an event for Final Fantasy VII: Advent Children in 2005

William Robert "Rob" Pinkston IV (born January 30, 1988) is an American actor who appeared during the fourth season of MTV's hidden camera practical joke television series, Punk'd. He also played Coconut Head on Nickelodeon's Ned's Declassified School Survival Guide. He attended William S. Hart High School, in Santa Clarita, California, a city located north of Los Angeles. He was in Extreme Movie with Ryan Pinkston (no relation) and Frankie Muniz.

== Early life ==
Pinkston was born William Robert Pinkston IV on January 30, 1988 in Atlanta, Georgia to Patricia (née Palmeiro) and William Robert Pinkston III.

== Career ==
=== Punk'd ===
Pinkston appeared several times in the fourth season of the reality series Punk'd. His first appearance was in the third episode as a troubled youth whose apparent fight with his aunt leads to Serena Williams becoming involved. After Pinkston steals his aunt's car, Williams helps her pursue Pinkston until Ashton Kutcher reveals himself and the situation as a practical joke. In the season's third episode, Kutcher and Donald Faison enlist Pinkston to set up a prank on Zach Braff. In the season's fourth episode, Pinkston pulls a prank on Dirk Nowitzki by convincing him to sign a menu. In the season's sixth episode, Pinkston pranks Joss Stone by pretending to destroy an expensive statue.

=== Other appearances ===
In 2004, Pinkston played Coconut Head on Nickelodeon's Ned's Declassified School Survival Guide. He got the role in January 2004 on his 16th birthday. Pinkston appeared as Coconut Head in almost every episode, the only recurring actor to do so. Also in 2005, Pinkston had a starring role in the feature film The Derby Stallion along with a young Zac Efron. Pinkston also has a starring role in The Sasquatch Gang, a feature film produced by Jeremy Coon and written/directed by Napoleon Dynamite's Tim Skousen, which was set to be released in 2006, but has not been released because the studio that bought the movie was acquired by another company. The movie was released in the fall of 2007.

Pinkston also appeared in the third season Ben 10 episode "Under Wraps", as Todd the farm boy.

Pinkston was the voice-over on the CBS reality show Kid Nation.

On May 31, 2023, Pinkston was interviewed as a guest on the podcast Ned's Declassified Podcast Survival Guide hosted by his former Ned's Declassified School Survival Guide castmates, Devon Werkheiser, Daniel Curtis Lee, and Lindsey Shaw.

== Personal life ==
Pinkston currently serves as a StarPower Ambassador for the Starlight Children's Foundation, encouraging other young people to commit their time, energy and resources to help other individuals and working with Starlight to brighten the lives of seriously ill people.

Pinkston has been in a relationship with online influencer Samira since April 2021.

== Filmography ==
=== Film ===
- The Derby Stallion (2005) as Chuck Overton
- The Sasquatch Dumpling Gang (2006) as Maynard Keyes
- Extreme Movie (2008) as Griffin

=== Television ===
- Punk'd (2005) (Season 4 Episode 4) as Field Agent
- Ned's Declassified School Survival Guide (2004–2007) as Coconut Head
- Ben 10 (2007) as Todd Maplewood
- Enter Mode 5 (2007) as The Kid

=== Music videos ===
- Say Anything feat. Hayley Williams (2008) (Church Channel) as Main Character
- Skylar Spence (2015) (Can't You See) as Protagonist
