= Masha Lund =

Danish-Russian model, actor and designer (born 1981)

- Born: 24 March 1981 (age 45); Copenhagen, Denmark
- Occupations: model, actress, designer, entrepreneur
- Modeling information
- Height: 5 ft 7 in (1.70 m)
- Hair color: Blonde
- Eye color: Blue
- Agency: Pacific Talent and Models
- Website: www.mashalund.com

Masha Lund (born 24 March 1981), also known by the nickname MaLu, is a Danish/Russian model, actress, designer and entrepreneur. She is half Russian on her mother’s side, and half Danish on her father’s side, and is fluent in Danish, Russian and English.

== Early years ==
While spending a lot of her childhood in Lithuania, Masha got sponsored to come to the United States to model and act at age 20. Before that, she finished Danish Gymnasium and Business College. Her mother Elena Lund is a University teacher and her step-father, Dr Philosophy Allan Lund, is a Danish professor and writer. Her mother divorced her biological dad when Malu was 10 years old.

== Career ==
Masha started modeling and acting as a child. She did commercials for IKEA, E-Trade and several big brands in Denmark. By age 20, she signed with Pacific Talent and Models in Los Angeles, and she landed on billboards for Rockstar energy drink in 20 cities across the United States. This was followed by numerous magazine covers such as Maxim, GQ, Men's Health, Image & Style, People, FHM, Ralph, Women Fitness, and a celebrity spread for Playboy. Masha was also named sexiest woman in the world by FHM magazine. As she continued modeling and acting, she was featured in movies with Jack Black and Tenacious D in The Pick of Destiny, and Epic Movie with Carmen Electra, and Iron Man. She was featured in music videos for Eminem, Lady Gaga and many other big names. She has also been a spokesmodel for several brands including Dreamgirl Lingerie clothing company for 8 years and was featured on more billboards for 138 Water on Sunset Boulevard in Los Angeles. In 2010, she starred in a popular Danish reality show about career women from Denmark 'living the dream' in Los Angeles, called "Danske Hollywood Fruer". After years of surrounding herself in the glamorous modeling world and always around designers and beautiful clothing, locations and mansions; Masha built an interest for fashion, beauty, art and interior design. She is working on her own pet clothing lines, Prive Pet and BluAndMalu as she is a big dog lover, and has a French Bulldog named Blu.
