= Gibbins =

Gibbins is a surname.

Notable people with the surname include:

- David Gibbins (born 1962), underwater archaeologist and bestselling novelist
- Henry de Beltgens Gibbins (1865–1907), popular historian of 19th century England
- Joseph Gibbins (1888–1965), British trade unionist and Labour politician
- Mick Gibbins, English rugby league footballer of the 1970s and 1980s
- Mike Gibbins (1949–2005), Welsh drummer in the band Badfinger
- Roger Gibbins (born 1955), English former professional football player
- Vivian Gibbins (1901–1979), English amateur footballer
- Wes Gibbins, fictional character played by Alfred Enoch (List of How to Get Away with Murder characters)

== See also ==
- Gibbings (surname)
- Gibbs
- Chris Gibbin, U.S. filmmaker
