= Charles Gibbons (disambiguation) =

Charles Gibbons (1901–1968) was an American politician.

Charles Gibbons may also refer to:

- Charles Gibbons (artist) (born 1957), abstract artist
- Sir Charles Gibbons, 6th Baronet (1828–1909) of the Gibbons baronets

== See also ==
- Charles William Gibbings, agriculture educator
- Gibbons (surname)
