= Gibbings =

Gibbings is a surname.

People with the name include:

== People ==
- Charles William Gibbings (1916-2009) Canadian agricultural activist
- Robert Gibbings (1889-1958) Irish artist
- T. H. Robsjohn-Gibbings (1905-1976) British architect

== Fictional characters ==
- Clara Gibbings, main character from the eponymous 1934 Australian film Clara Gibbings

== See also ==
- Chris Gibbin, U.S. filmmaker
- Gibbins (surname)
