= Minutemen (film) =

2008 television film directed by Lev L. Spiro

- Film poster
- Screenplay by: John Killoran
- Story by: David Diamond; David Weissman
- Directed by: Lev L. Spiro
- Starring: Jason Dolley; Luke Benward; Nicholas Braun; Chelsea Staub; Steven R. McQueen; Kara Crane; Dexter Darden; J. P. Manoux
- Music by: Nathan Wang
- Country of origin: United States
- Original language: English

Production
- Producer: Douglas Sloan
- Cinematography: Bruce Douglas Johnson
- Editor: Mark Conte
- Running time: 90 minutes
- Production company: Salty Pictures
- Budget: $5 million

Original release
- Network: Disney Channel
- Release: January 25, 2008

Minutemen is a 2008 science-fiction Disney Channel Original Movie. The movie was the most viewed program on American cable TV for the week ending January 27, 2008, with 6.48 million viewers.

The film was written by John Killoran (writing the teleplay) and David Diamond and David Weissman (writing the story) and directed by Lev L. Spiro, who received a Directors Guild nomination for Outstanding Achievement in Children's Programs for it. Andrew Gunn, Ann Marie Sanderlin and Doug Sloan are the executive producers. The movie was originally slated for release in March 2008, but the film premiered on Disney Channel in United States on January 25.

== Plot ==
On their first day of high school, best friends Virgil Fox, Derek Beaugard, and Stephanie Jameson decide to try various activities. As Derek and Stephanie try out for the football and cheerleading teams respectively, Virgil tries to help young genius Charlie Tuttle after the latter interrupts football practice with a homemade rocket-powered vehicle. However, both are publicly humiliated by the jocks. Following this, Derek claims to Virgil that he tried to help the pair while Virgil comes to resent that day.

Three years later, Virgil and Charlie have become outcasts while Derek and Stephanie have become popular and entered a relationship. Amidst this, Charlie designs a time machine, recruits Virgil, and they enlist another outcast Zeke Thompson for his engineering expertise to help build it. During their first test run, the trio travel back in time and convince a local street performer to purchase a winning lottery ticket for them. However, they are forced to return to the present early, leading to the performer keeping their ticket and winning the lottery himself. Due to this, Virgil and Charlie decide to use the time machine to undo their classmates' bullying and embarrassment and recruit Jeannette Pachelewski, a classmate with an unrequited crush on Charlie, to oversee it while the trio are in the past. In the process, she gives them snowsuits to protect them from the time stream's freezing temperatures.

Throughout their adventures, the trio becomes known as the "Snowsuit Guys," despite their desire to be called the "Minutemen," and earn a heroic reputation with their classmates while Vice Principal Tolkan sees them as troublemakers. However, Charlie reveals he previously hacked into NASA's files to complete the time machine. To avoid attracting unwanted attention, Charlie advises Zeke and Virgil to minimize their use of the machine, but Virgil disobeys him to prevent Stephanie from suffering an injury and reveals his identity to her.

After Derek causes a loss at the state championship, Stephanie asks Virgil to help him win. Virgil mends his friendship with them while neglecting Charlie and Zeke. When Stephanie catches Derek cheating on her, he asks Virgil to avert it. Realizing his own feelings for her, Virgil proves reluctant.

Meanwhile, having monitored the Minutemen's activities, the FBI locates and interrogates the trio, causing them to disband over Virgil's selfishness. After consulting with government scientists, Charlie learns that the Minutemen's work damaged the space-time continuum and created a black hole. With hours to act, the trio reunites and ventures into it to repair the damage. Transported back to their first day of high school, Virgil considers stopping himself from meeting Charlie, but Charlie admits he cherishes this day because it was when he got a real friend. Virgil starts having second thoughts and discovers Derek contributed to their humiliation in order to join the football team.

Virgil reconciles with Charlie and Zeke before the trio re-enter the black hole as it closes and are brought back to the day they first time traveled. While exploring the school, they learn that nobody remembers their activities. As Virgil confronts Derek over his disloyalty and admits feelings to Stephanie, Charlie reveals an idea for a teleportation machine, though Virgil and Zeke carry him away.

== Cast ==
- Jason Dolley as Virgil Fox, the leader of the Minutemen
- Luke Benward as Charlie Tuttle, the member of the Minutemen
- Nicholas Braun as Zeke Thompson, the member of the Minutemen
- Chelsea Staub as Stephanie Jameson, Virgil's best friend later love interest
- Steven R. McQueen as Derek Beaugard, Virgil's best friend
- J. P. Manoux as Vice Principal Tolkan
- Kara Crane as Jeannette Pachelewski
- Dexter Darden as Chester
- Kellie Cockrell as Jocelyn
- Molly Jepson as Amy

Additionally, Larry Filion and Dwayne Hackett make uncredited appearances as an FBI agent and a store manager, respectively.

== Production ==
Disney Channel first released an official press via its press release website DisneyChannelMedianet.com on July 14, 2007, to confirm the production of Minutemen. The lead star, plot, writers, director, and executive producers of this movie were revealed in this press. In addition, another 2008 DCOM named Camp Rock, scheduled to begin production in September 2007, was also confirmed in the same press.

=== Location ===
Minutemen was filmed at Murray High School. Murray High School was also the set of the auditorium scene of High School Musical (2006), and High School Musical: Get in the Picture (2008). Filming also took place at Highland High School located in Sugar House.

== Featured music ==
The first single of the movie, "Run It Back Again" by Corbin Bleu was released January 22, 2008 on Radio Disney Jams, Vol. 10 and its music video premiered on Disney Channel. Another single titled "Like Whoa" from Aly & AJ began airing January 19 around the world, as a music video on Disney Channel. The song became available on their album Insomniatic.

== Reception ==
Minutemen premiered on Disney Channel on January 25, 2008, with 6.48 million views.
