= Atlantis (novel) =

2005 novel by David Gibbins

- First UK edition
- Author: David Gibbins
- Cover artist: Lee Gibbons
- Language: English
- Series: Jack Howard series
- Genre: archaeological thriller
- Publisher: Headline (UK); Bantam Dell (US)
- Publication date: 2005
- Publication place: UK
- Media type: hardback, paperback, audiobook and ebook
- Pages: 337 (hardback)
- ISBN: 0-7553-2421-8
- Followed by: Crusader Gold

Atlantis is an archaeological adventure novel by David Gibbins. First published in 2005, it is the first book in Gibbins's Jack Howard series. It has been published in 30 languages and has sold over a million copies, and is the basis for a TV miniseries currently in development.

== Sequel ==
David Gibbins's sixth novel in the Jack Howard series, The Gods of Atlantis, published by Headline in 2011, is a sequel to Atlantis.
