= Henry Gale =

Henry Gale may refer to:

- Henry Gale (cricketer) (1836–1898), English cricketer
- Henry Gale (astrophysicist) (1874–1942), American astrophysicist and author
- Henry Gale (British Army officer) (1883–1944), British Army officer
- Uncle Henry (Oz), fictional character in the early 1900s L. Frank Baum Oz series
- Henry Gale (Lost), later known as Ben Linus, a fictional character in the 2006 television series Lost
- Henry Gale Sanders (born 1942), American actor
- Henry Gales (1834–1897), English painter

== See also ==
- Christopher Henry Gayle (born 1979), Jamaican cricketer
