= From Within (film) =

- Teaser poster
- Directed by: Phedon Papamichael
- Written by: Brad Keene
- Produced by: Chris Gibbin; Adrian Butchart
- Starring: Elizabeth Rice; Thomas Dekker; Adam Goldberg; Kelly Blatz; Laura Allen; Rumer Willis
- Music by: Jason Cooper; Oliver Kraus; The Hoosiers; Ane Brun
- Distributed by: After Dark Films; Lionsgate
- Release date: April 25, 2008 (Tribeca Film Festival)
- Running time: 89 minutes
- Country: United States
- Language: English

From Within is a 2008 American horror film directed by Phedon Papamichael and written by Brad Keene. Filming took place in Maryland in fall 2007. The film premiered at the Tribeca Film Festival in April–May 2008.

== Plot ==
Teenaged Natalie Wilburn sits with her boyfriend, Sean, as he reads from a black book. He finishes reading, kisses her passionately, then pulls out a gun and commits suicide.

In the small town of Grovetown, Maryland, high school girl Lindsay is shopping with her stepmother, Trish, for new church clothes. As they argue, Natalie bursts into the shop covered in blood and mumbling about a girl following her. Lindsay watches over her and notices the black book she holds. When Lindsay goes to fetch Bernard, Natalie's father, the door to the back room slams shut on Natalie. Bernard knocks down the door, only to find Natalie dying, with a pair of scissors lodged in her neck.

That night, Bernard is haunted by a ghostly figure and is found dead the following day by his niece, Molly, hanged in the same room Natalie died in.

On Monday at school, Lindsay's boyfriend, Dylan, who is the son of the local pastor, is found publicly attacking Aidan Spindle, a newly returned local misfit. Dylan blames Aidan's family for the recent deaths. Following the fight, Lindsay tends to Aidan's minor wounds and drives him home. It turns out that Aidan's brother is Sean, whose suicide has been overshadowed by Natalie's death.

The same night, Molly starts seeing a ghost that looks exactly like her, which slits Molly's wrists. The following day, Lindsay's best friend Claire drives past Molly's body and immediately begins to hear voices. Later, a duplicate of Claire is seen in the toilets while Claire is using the facilities.

Simultaneously, Lindsay becomes aware of the religious fervor Dylan is stirring among the townsfolk against Aidan and goes to warn him of the danger. On entering his house, she meets his cousin, Sadie, who had traveled down from NYC for Sean's funeral.

Meanwhile, Claire encounters her doppelgänger and unsuccessfully tries to evade her. It finally catches up with her as she is driving, and her car explodes in front of Trish, who tried to rescue her. Aidan takes Lindsay to a stream running underneath a bridge, and confirms that his mother practiced a form of witchcraft, which may be the cause of the suicides. He tells her to leave Grovetown.

Lindsay arrives home that night and is abducted by Dylan and Roy, Trish's lover, with Trish's consent. She is taken to the local church to be "purified". Returning home that night, Trish is jubilant about "being saved", but is later haunted by doppelgängers of herself on the TV. After being stalked throughout the house, Trish's doppelgänger compels her to drink drain cleaner, believing it to be whiskey. Lindsay finds Trish's body, and she rushes to Aidan's house, frantic in her belief that a curse has gotten inside of her and will demand her death. Aidan admits that victims of the curse see themselves, but swears that all victims commit suicide because they are compelled to, not because something takes over them. Aidan supplies Lindsay with oil to apply to her skin that will slow the curse's progress. Aidan realizes that the black book is the key to locking up what Sean had unlocked. Lindsay suggests the church as the book's new location, and she and Aidan break in. Dylan, Roy, Pastor Joe, and Paul (another member of Joe's congregation) realize that Aidan retrieved the book. Back at Aidan's house, Sadie pulls a gun on Aidan and Lindsay; she wants the book and explains that Sean deliberately killed himself in order for the curse to start. They manage to rescue the book just as Sadie attempts to burn it. Paul, Roy, and Dylan burst into the home. Aidan and Lindsay escape to the woods, with Dylan and Paul following as Roy guards Sadie. While running, Aidan and Lindsay split, intending to meet up at the pier.

Back at the home, Roy tells Sadie how he became a religious man and then sets her alight with gasoline, claiming that he is doing God's will. In the woods, Lindsay makes it to the pier, but her doppelgänger ghost is hot on her tail. She stops at the edge of the platform and starts reciting a prayer, when she falls into the water.

Meanwhile, Dylan continues to hunt Aidan, but he is ambushed, with Aidan putting Sadie's gun to his head. Lindsay's screams for help draw him away. Lindsay panics as her doppelgänger emerges from the water behind her. Lindsay quickly climbs out of the water alive, then blood drips onto her back; the ghost's eye is bleeding as Lindsay sits up. The ghost grabs the rope and hands it to Lindsay, who starts to wrap it around her own neck to strangle herself. Aidan rushes to her and stops her, and they continue trying to dispel the curse. Aidan merges his own blood with Sean's in the book and says that because a sacrifice started the curse, a sacrifice must end it. Aidan passionately kisses her and tells her to burn the book, before seemingly shooting himself. Dylan and Paul then show up, with Dylan believing Lindsay to be a devil worshiper. He pulls his gun on her. Lindsay stands, Sadie's gun in her hands, as she begs Dylan to walk away. He raises his rifle at her, and she shoots him. Paul quickly runs off. Not long after the cops arrive, but they find that Aidan's sacrifice doesn't count; Dylan had actually shot him in the chest as Aidan was pointing the gun at his own head.

In the woods, Lindsay tries to burn the book, but to no avail, as the curse is still around. The ghost creates a gust of wind that blows out the fire before claiming Lindsay. The film ends with a montage of other characters dead by suicide.

== Cast ==
- Elizabeth Rice as Lindsay, the film's central character.
- Thomas Dekker as Aidan Spindle, a supposed Devil worshipper
- Kelly Blatz as Dylan, Lindsay's religious boyfriend
- Laura Allen as Trish, Lindsay's religion-obsessed stepmother.
- Adam Goldberg as Roy, Trish's lover
- Rumer Willis as Natalie Wilburn, girlfriend to Sean
- Margo Harshman as Sadie, Aidan and Sean's cousin
- Britt Robertson as Claire, Lindsay's best friend
- Jared Harris as Bernard Wilburn, Natalie's father
- Steven Culp as Pastor Joe, Dylan's father
- Caitlin Gold as Julie, Lindsay's other best friend
- Amanda Babin as Molly, Natalie's cousin
- Michelle Babin as Evil Molly, a form the entity takes on when targeting Molly
- Shiloh Fernandez as Sean Spindle, Natalie's boyfriend and Aidan's brother
- Mark A. Cummins as Classroom Teacher

== Production ==
In July 2007, director Phedon Papamichael was hired to direct From Within, a thriller based on a script by Brad Keene. The film was financed through a European equity fund. Production began in July or August 2007 in Maryland. The writer described the film: "I wanted to write something that was scary and high concept and dealt with personal issues, namely religious beliefs and how they play a part in who we are and the way we lead our lives." Papamichael desired to make From Within in the tradition of The Shining (1980) and Rosemary's Baby (1968). For From Within, filming took place in Perry Point, Maryland, a defunct estate with homes that would be torn down after the completion of production. The film entered post-production in August 2007.

== Release ==
Filmmakers originally planned to finish production in time to release the film for the Sundance Film Festival in February 2008, but not being complete in time, From Within ultimately had its world premiere at the Tribeca Film Festival that runs between April and May 2008. The film entered the festival "riding a considerable wave of buzz and expectation", but The Hollywood Reporter reported that it played to "mediocre reception". From Within later won awards at the Solstice Film Festival in June 2008, for Best Feature Film, Best Original Score, Best Actor (Thomas Dekker) and Best Actress (Elizabeth Rice). It was chosen for the Official Selection at the London FrightFest Film Festival and the Fantasia Festival in Montreal.

The film was released on January 9, 2009 as part of the third After Dark Films 8 Films to Die For series.
