= Glory Daze (2010 TV series) =

2010 American comedy-drama television series

- Genre: Comedy drama
- Created by: Walt Becker; Michael LeSieur
- Starring: Kelly Blatz; Matt Bush; Drew Seeley; Hartley Sawyer; Callard Harris; Julianna Guill; Tim Jo; James Earl; Josh Brener; Chris D'Elia; Tim Meadows
- Opening theme: "Police on My Back" by The Clash
- Composer: Mark Mothersbaugh
- Country of origin: United States
- Original language: English
- No. of seasons: 1
- No. of episodes: 10

Production
- Executive producers: Walt Becker; Dan Cohen; Michael LeSieur; F.J. Pratt
- Producer: Alice West
- Cinematography: Mark Doering-Powell
- Running time: 42 minutes
- Production companies: The Walt Becker Company; Warner Horizon Television; TBS Productions

Original release
- Network: TBS
- Release: November 16, 2010 – January 18, 2011

Glory Daze is an American comedy-drama television series. The one-hour series revolves around a group of college freshmen who pledge a fraternity in 1986. The series aired from November 16, 2010, to January 18, 2011, on TBS.

On February 24, 2011, TBS announced that the series would not be renewed for a second season due to poor ratings.

== Premise ==
Set in 1986 in the state of Indiana, the series revolves around a group of friends entering their freshman year of college at Hayes University. The young men must deal with being on their own for the first time and preparing for what is to come in their college years.

== Cast and characters ==
=== Main ===
- Kelly Blatz as Joel Harrington – Joel is a pre-med student and is very dedicated to his studies. In the beginning of the series he has second thoughts on joining the Omega Sigma fraternity knowing it would disappoint his father. He later decides to join after being encouraged by his friends. He has strong feelings for Christie, Damon's girlfriend. He is a devout Catholic.
- Matt Bush as Eli Feldman – Eli enters college as a virgin and desperately wants to lose his innocence, despite his frequent bad luck with women. He is very impulsive when the right situation drives him to be. He is Jewish.
- Hartley Sawyer as Brian Sommers – Brian is a jock and is admitted to Hayes University on a baseball scholarship. He is willing to do anything to help his friends and is also quite intelligent, having a great knowledge of seemingly random information.
- Drew Seeley as Jason Wilson – Jason is rich and a Republican and has strong future aspirations to enter politics. He originally wanted to join the Zhea Rho fraternity due to their strong history of housing future politicians, but reconsiders to join his friends at Omega Sigma fraternity.
- Callard Harris as Mike Reno – Reno is one of the upperclassmen at the Omega Sigma fraternity. He has a very laid-back attitude and is always ready to guide the freshmen on the craziness of college life.
- Julianna Guill as Christie DeWitt – Christie is a student at Hayes University and is Damon's girlfriend. She is always very sweet and kind especially towards Joel, which is why Joel has romantic feelings for her. In the episode "Hit Me with Your Test Shot", she learns about Joel's feelings after seeing drawings of herself in Joel's notes. Even after Joel finds out about Christie knowing about the drawings, they still decide to stay friends.
- Tim Jo as Alex Chang – Alex is Eli's dorm roommate. He is Asian and decides to join the fraternity for Asian students but then quits due to the hard partying.
- James Earl as Tom "Turbo" Turley – Turbo is another upperclassman at the Omega Sigma fraternity and the pledgemaster. He is African-American and enjoys hip hop music. He is very kind to the freshmen but always ready to whip them into shape due to his strong dedication to the fraternity.
- Josh Brener as Zack Miller – Zack is Joel's dorm roommate. He is very awkward and makes people around him very uncomfortable.
- Chris D'Elia as William Xavier "Bill" Stankowski – Stankowski is an upperclassman at the Omega Sigma fraternity. He is known for being very wise and helpful. Not much is known about his personal life other than he has lived in the Omega Sigma house since 1976 and inhales a lot of cannabis.
- Tim Meadows as Professor Aloysius Haines – Professor Haines is Joel and Christie's Political science professor. He went through a difficult divorce with his wife and frequently expresses his personal problems and political opinions in front of his class. Joel always seems to get on his bad side, although there are times when Haines does accept that Joel tries his best to please him. He also serves as the Omega Sigma faculty advisor.

=== Supporting ===
- Eric Nenninger as Damon Smythe – Damon is the leader of the Omega Sigma fraternity. He is the most responsible person in the house and has no idea about Joel's feelings for his girlfriend Christie.
- David Guzman as Hector – Hector is a Mexican dwarf living in the fraternity house.
- Natalie Dreyfuss as Julie – Julie is Jason's girlfriend. She was accepted to Yale University, but chooses to attend Hayes to be with Jason. She sometimes questions her decision due to Jason messing up on a number of occasions.
- Teri Polo as Professor Larsen – Professor Larsen is an English professor at the university. After meeting Mike Reno at the grocery store, Reno appears to have the impression that Larsen's strict behavior is just a front to her actual witty and attractive personality.
- Alexandra Chando as Annabelle – Annabelle is Brian's girlfriend. They meet at a mixer with Kappa Theta sorority. At first she does not like jocks being that Brian is one, but quickly changes her mind after seeing his physique. It is later revealed that Annabelle and Brian break up after she joins a cult.
- Kim Shaw as Tammy – Tammy is the daughter of one of Joel's mother's friends. Since being set up with Joel, she is very infatuated with him.
- Brad Garrett as Jerry Harrington – Jerry is Joel's father. He disapproves of Joel's decision to join a fraternity.
- Fred Willard as Dr. Reynolds – Dr. Reynolds is the University Hospital doctor. He treats Eli for a burn after a hazing went awry.
- D. L. Hughley as Coach Franklin – Coach Franklin is Brian's baseball coach. He is infertile, and looks to Brian as a surrogate son. His wife is Korean.

=== Guest stars ===
- Cheri Oteri as Maureen Harrington, Joel's mother
- John Michael Higgins as Brother Jerrold, the Omega Sig chapter master
- David Koechner as Coach D'Amato, Brian's original baseball coach
- Justin Chon as an Asian Frat Bro, an Asian fraternity brother who dislikes anyone who is not Asian
- Kevin Nealon as Marcus, fake ID maker
- Andy Richter as Father Sullivan, Hayes University priest
- Curtis Armstrong as Morty Feldman, Eli's father
- Reginald VelJohnson as Stan Turley, Turbo's father
- Geoff Pierson as Col. Zachariah Smythe, Damon's father
- Barry Bostwick as Mr. Wilson, Jason's father
- Ken Lerner as Rabbi Shapiro
- Michael McKean as Stu, Hayes University gardener
- Mindy Sterling as Movie ticket lady
- Gina Gershon as Lt. Lang, teacher of R.O.T.C. course
- Tasha Smith as Lea, Professor Haines' ex-wife
- Kathryn Fiore as Janie, a woman Eli nearly loses his virginity to

== Episodes ==
With the exception of the pilot episode, every episode title is a parody reference to a popular 1980s song.

| No. | Title | Directed by | Written by | Original release date | Prod. code | U.S. viewers (millions) |
|---|---|---|---|---|---|---|
| 1 | "Pilot" | Walt Becker | Walt Becker & Michael LeSieur | November 16, 2010 | 2M5550 | 1.828 |
Four college freshmen decide to pledge the Omega Sigma fraternity at Hayes University in 1986. While doing so they encounter a number of shenanigans that nearly ruins their chances.
| 2 | "Fake Me Home Tonight" | Walt Becker | Walt Becker & Michael LeSieur | November 23, 2010 | 2M5551 | 1.312 |
The pledges are sent on a hunt to find a particular beer for Stankowski's birthday. To get the beer, they must get fake ID's from awkward ID maker (Kevin Nealon). Reno signs up for Professor Larsen's (Teri Polo) class to get close to her.
| 3 | "Hungry Like Teen Wolf" | Lev L. Spiro | Chad Fiveash & James Stoteraux | November 30, 2010 | 2M5552 | 1.223 |
The pledges attend their first mixer with Kappa Theta sorority. Jason worries about Julie (Natalie Dreyfuss) hooking up with another guy at her sorority mixer. Reno urges Professor Haines to become the fraternity's faculty advisor.
| 4 | "Papa Don't Pre-Game" | Walt Becker | Dan Cohen & F.J. Pratt | December 7, 2010 | 2M5554 | 1.487 |
The pledges are nervous about Dad's Day weekend on campus. Joel's father (Brad Garrett) gets high after sleeping for the night in Stankowski's room and acts weird for most of the time. Brian's baseball coach (D. L. Hughley) agrees to substitute as his dad. Eli is surprised by his father's (Curtis Armstrong) new youthful attitude. Jason's father (Barry Bostwick) disapproves of him joining the Omega Sigs. Christie encourages Julie to loosen up her personality.
| 5 | "Why Shant This Be Love" | Robert Berlinger | Michael Platt & Barry Safchik | December 14, 2010 | 2M5553 | 1.131 |
The Omega Sigs get caught up in a prank war with the Zeta Rhos fraternity. Joel gets a job working under the university gardener (Michael McKean), but the job and being at the fraternity hurt his grades when he fails an exam for the first time in his life. Eli has a hard time abandoning the fraternity's mud football game when he must celebrate Yom Kippur.
| 6 | "I Ram (So Far Away)" | Gil Junger | Abby Gewanter | December 21, 2010 | 2M5555 | 1.115 |
The Omega Sigs are on edge when the head of the fraternity national chapter, Brother Jerrold (John Michael Higgins) visits. The pledges must clean up Stankowski's act for the visit. While in line to get tickets to General Public, Joel gets to know Christie a lot more.
| 7 | "What's Love Got to Nude With It?" | Gil Junger | Grace Parra & Jonathan V. Hludzinski | December 28, 2010 | 2M5556 | N/A |
Joel becomes too overwhelmed with his feelings for Christie. He is then set up with Tammy (Kim Shaw), the daughter of his mother's friend. The Omega Sigs pretend to be a conservative fraternity in order to have a formal dance at a hotel. Brian and Annabelle (Alexandra Chando) try to abstain from sex, because they feel it is interfering with their college priorities. After seeing the film Top Gun, Eli becomes inspired to join an R.O.T.C. course taught by a strict teacher (Gina Gershon).
| 8 | "Shamrock You Like a Hurricane" | Jerry Levine | Chad Fiveash & James Stoteraux | January 4, 2011 | 2M5557 | N/A |
During Rivalry Week, the pledges lose a prized statue they were assigned to guard. Joel and the gang retaliate by kidnapping the other school's mascot, a leprechaun. The feisty leprechaun escapes, leading to havoc in the Omega Sig house.
| 9 | "Hit Me With Your Test Shot" | Betsy Thomas | Story by : Abby Gewanter; Teleplay by : Michael Platt & Barry Safchik | January 11, 2011 | 2M5558 | 1.113 |
Midterms are about to start, and Joel lends notes to Christie which (he had forgotten) include pictures of Christie that Joel drew. Joel and Brian then sneak into the sorority before she finds out about the drawings. Meanwhile, Eli pretends to like the Boston Red Sox during the 1986 World Series game against the New York Mets to get a girl to sleep with him. Jason and Turbo bond over hip hop music and Reno tries to reunite Professor Haines with his wife (Tasha Smith), just when their divorce is about to become finalized.
| 10 | "Some Like It Hot Tub" | Gil Junger | Story by : Dan Cohen & F.J. Pratt; Teleplay by : Michael LeSieur | January 18, 2011 | 2M5559 | 1.053 |
The Omega Sigs host a hot tub party at the house. After telling Joel about having seen the drawings of herself, Christie begins to question her feelings for Joel, with Joel feeling the same way. Jason feels inadequate, when Julie has her first real orgasm sitting on top of a laundry machine. Professor Haines and Brother Jerrold form an unlikely friendship.

== Development and production ==
The pilot was written by Walt Becker and Michael LeSieur, who received a cast-contingent pilot commitment from TBS in late January 2010. On May 14, 2010, TBS announced it had picked up the series with an eight-episode order. The order was increased to ten episodes in early November 2010, a week before the series premiere.

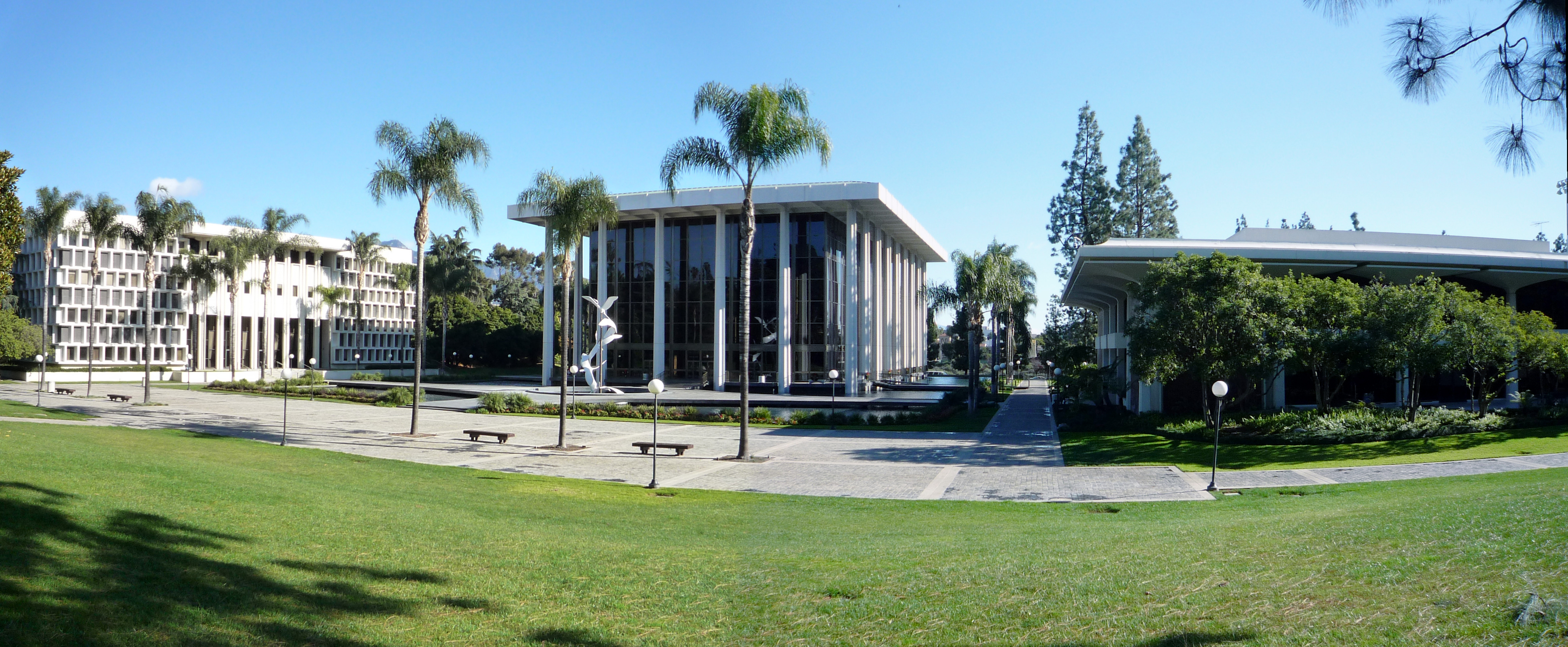
The Ambassador Auditorium and surrounding buildings near the filming of Glory Daze

When speaking of the series, Michael Wright, the executive vice president and head of programming for TBS, TNT, and Turner Classic Movies said: "Glory Daze is a sharply written, laugh-out-loud comedy with a talented ensemble cast, including comic veteran Tim Meadows. The time is right for this feel-good, funny, and fresh take on college life in the '80s."

Glory Daze was filmed at USC's Mudd Hall of Philosophy and on both the UCLA campus and the former Ambassador College campus in Pasadena, CA.

The show's theme song, "Police on My Back", is performed by The Clash.

== Critical reception ==
The show received a mixed reaction. On Metacritic, the series received "mixed or average reviews", reflected by a Metascore of 47 out of 100, based on 18 reviews.
