= Crusader Gold =

2006 novel by David Gibbins

- First UK edition
- Author: David Gibbins
- Cover artist: Lee Gibbons/David Grogan
- Language: English
- Series: Jack Howard series
- Genre: archaeological thriller
- Publisher: Headline (UK); Bantam Dell (US)
- Publication date: 2006
- Publication place: UK
- Media type: hardback, paperback, audiobook and ebook
- Pages: 339 (hardback)
- ISBN: 0-7553-2423-4
- Preceded by: Atlantis
- Followed by: The Last Gospel

Crusader Gold is an archaeological adventure novel by David Gibbins. First published in 2006, it is the second book in Gibbins's Jack Howard series. It has been published in more than 20 languages and was a New York Times bestseller.

== Plot summary ==
Following a prologue set in AD 71 when the golden menorah from the Jewish Temple in Jerusalem is locked away in Rome, the novel picks up in present-day Turkey with marine archaeologist Jack Howard on a hunt for ancient treasures in the harbour of Istanbul, formerly Constantinople. One item not among the treasures thrown into the harbour when the Crusaders pillaged the city is the menorah, and Jack soon learns from colleagues Jeremy and Maria that it may have been stolen from Constantinople by Norse warrior Harald Hardrada during his service to the emperor of Constantinople and taken by him on his explorations of the New World.

Jack goes to the monastery at Iona in Scotland to see a priest who tells him that the Nazi Ahnenerbe were on the trail of the menorah in the 1930s. The priest is found gruesomely murdered, showing that there are present-day Nazis who are shadowing them. In Greenland Jack and his friend Costas dive inside an iceberg, where they find a perfectly preserved Viking ship burial containing one of Hardrada's warriors. They go to L'Anse aux Meadows, the Viking site in Greenland, where further clues lead them to the Yucatán in Mexico, where Hardrada and his men had a final standoff with the Maya. After a perilous dive into a cenote, Jack discovers the truth of Hardrada's last stand and the fate of the menorah, and he has his own final standoff with the latter-day Nazi and his henchmen who have been following him.

The book ends with a chapter-length Author's Note in which Gibbins details the historical and archaeological facts behind the fiction in the novel.
