= David Weissman =

American screenwriter and director

David Weissman is an American screenwriter and director, most known for his comedies. He frequently collaborates with David Diamond. Diamond and Weissman met in high school, at Akiba Hebrew Academy (now Jack M. Barrack Hebrew Academy). They graduated in 1983.

His film credits include Dream a Little Dream 2 (his only produced project not co-written with Diamond), The Family Man, Old Dogs, When in Rome, Evolution and the television film Minutemen.

== Career ==
The duo sold their first spec script, The Whiz Kid, to 20th Century Fox in 1994. Their first produced project came in 2000, The Family Man starring Nicolas Cage and Tea Leoni. Cage's production company, Saturn Films, helped produce the film. The Family Man opened at #3 at the North American box office making $15.1 million in its opening weekend, behind What Women Want and Cast Away, which opened at the top spot.

Diamond and Weissman next wrote the sci-fi comedy Evolution, helmed by Ivan Reitman. Evolution was based on a story by Don Jakoby, who turned it into a screenplay along with Diamond and Weissman. The film was originally written as a serious horror science fiction film, until director Reitman re-wrote much of the script. A short-lived animated series, Alienators: Evolution Continues, loosely based on the film, was broadcast months after the film was released. In 2005, they partnered with Wedding Crashers producer Andrew Panay on Old Dogs and When In Rome.

In 2019, the duo published a screenwriting manual, Bulletproof: Writing Scripts That Don't Get Shot Down. The book draws from their extensive film experience.
