= The Family Man =

2000 film directed by Brett Ratner

- Theatrical release poster
- Directed by: Brett Ratner
- Written by: David Diamond; David Weissman
- Produced by: Marc Abraham; Howard Rosenman; Tony Ludwig; Alan Riche
- Starring: Nicolas Cage; Téa Leoni; Jeremy Piven; Saul Rubinek; Don Cheadle
- Cinematography: Dante Spinotti
- Edited by: Mark Helfrich
- Music by: Danny Elfman
- Production companies: Beacon Pictures; Saturn Films
- Distributed by: Universal Pictures (North America); Buena Vista Film Sales (International)
- Release date: December 22, 2000
- Running time: 125 minutes
- Country: United States
- Language: English
- Budget: $60 million
- Box office: $124.7 million

The Family Man is a 2000 American romantic fantasy comedy-drama film directed by Brett Ratner, from a screenplay by David Diamond and David Weissman. The film stars Nicolas Cage and Téa Leoni, with Don Cheadle, Saul Rubinek, and Jeremy Piven in supporting roles.

The Family Man was theatrically released in the United States on December 22, 2000, by Universal Pictures. The film received mixed reviews from critics and grossed over $124.7 million worldwide against its $60 million budget. At the 27th Saturn Awards, it was nominated for Best Fantasy Film and won Best Actress for Leoni.

== Plot ==
In 1987, Jack and Kate, who have been together since college, are at JFK Airport, where he is about to leave to take up a twelve-month internship with Barclays in London. She fears the separation will be detrimental to their relationship and asks him not to go, but he reassures her that their love is strong enough to last and that the internship will be beneficial to their future together.

Thirteen years later in 2000, Jack is a wealthy bachelor and Wall Street executive in New York City. At work, he is putting together a multi-billion dollar merger and has ordered an emergency meeting on Christmas Day, disregarding his employees' desires to spend time with their families. In his office, on Christmas Eve, he gets a message to contact Kate. Jack ponders whether Kate is attempting to reconnect, but chooses not to return her call.

On his way home, Jack is in a convenience store when a young man, Cash, enters claiming to have a winning lottery ticket worth $238, but the store clerk refuses him, saying the ticket is a forgery. Cash pulls out a gun, and Jack, trying to defuse the situation, offers to buy the ticket, calling it a “business deal." Cash eventually agrees.

Outside, Jack patronizingly tries to help Cash, who, feeling like he is being preached to, asks Jack if anything is missing from his own life. When Jack haplessly says he has everything he needs, Cash enigmatically remarks that Jack has "brought this upon himself" and walks away. A puzzled Jack returns to his penthouse to sleep.

Jack wakes up the next morning on Christmas Day in a suburban New Jersey bedroom with Kate and two children. Confused, he rushes out to his home in New York, but the doorman and his neighbor claim not to recognize him. He goes to his office, which is closed for the holiday, and is turned away by security. Outside, he encounters Cash, now smartly dressed and driving Jack's Ferrari. Although Cash offers to explain what is happening, all he does is make a vague reference to "the organization" and tell Jack that he is getting "a glimpse" of something that will help him to figure out for himself what is important in life.

Jack returns to the house and tries to tell Kate the truth, but she reacts angrily. He receives some help from his young daughter, Annie, who believes Jack is an alien and her real father will soon return. He struggles to adjust to fatherhood and his modest family life, finding that he is a tire salesman working for Kate's father and Kate is a non-profit lawyer. After discovering this is the life he would have had if he had stayed in the U.S. as Kate had asked, he lashes out at Kate and expresses resentment for her holding him back.

Jack later apologizes and realizes he never fell out of love with Kate. He comes to enjoy his family life and begins succeeding at his sales job. One day his former boss, Peter Lassiter, comes in to have a tire blowout fixed. Taking advantage of the chance meeting, Jack uses his business savvy to impress Lassiter, who invites Jack to his office, where Jack worked in his 'other' life.

There, after a short interview, Lassiter offers him a position. While he is excited by the potential salary and other perks, including a lavish apartment in Manhattan, Kate is less certain. She expresses deep misgivings about raising their children in the city and leaving their old life behind, telling Jack that they should be thankful for the life they have.

Jack returns home only to discover his plane ticket to London. Upon closer examination, he realizes that he did in fact take the flight, but then came back the next day to be with Kate. Reminded of Jack's choice, she reciprocates his feelings by telling Jack that she is prepared to follow him and move the family to the city to do just as Jack did for her.

Jack encounters Cash at a grocery store and is frightened by the idea of leaving this life, which he now loves, behind. Cash reminds him that a glimpse, by definition, is an impermanent thing. Jack returns home again and watches over his children and then tries to stay awake while watching Kate sleep but eventually does fall asleep and wakes to find he has returned to his old life, on Christmas Day.

Jack returns to the office to close the big acquisition deal, making plans to fly to Aspen to prevent it from failing, but first visits Kate, now an unmarried corporate lawyer, preparing to move to Paris. She only called him to return a box of his old possessions, and when Jack asks her to meet for coffee, she suggests that he look her up if he is ever in Paris.

Jack chooses not to go to Aspen and instead chases after Kate to the airport and begs her to stay. Confused, she refuses. Jack then describes in detail their life together and their children, saying it was a dream that seemed real and admitting that he can no longer conceive of a life without her. Intrigued, she eventually agrees to go with him for a coffee.

== Cast ==
- Nicolas Cage as Jack Campbell
- Téa Leoni as Kate Reynolds-Campbell, Jack's ex-girlfriend/wife
- Don Cheadle as Cash
- Jeremy Piven as Arnie
- Josef Sommer as Peter Lassiter
- Saul Rubinek as Alan Mintz
- Mary Beth Hurt as Adelle
- Harve Presnell as Ed Reynolds, Kate's father
- Tom McGowan as Bill
- Lisa Thornhill as Evelyn Thompson
- Makenzie Vega as Annie Campbell, Jack & Kate's daughter
- Jake and Ryan Milkovich as Josh Campbell, Jack & Kate's son
- Francine York as Lorraine Reynolds, Kate's mother
- Amber Valletta as Paula
- Ken Leung as Sam Wong
- Kate Walsh as Jeannie
- Gianni Russo as Nick
- Joel McKinnon Miller as Tommy
- Robert Downey Sr. as Man in house
- Paul Sorvino (deleted scenes) as Sidney Potter

== Production ==
=== Development ===
Producer Marc Abraham first became aware of the project when veteran producers Alan Riche, Tony Ludwig and Howard Rosenman brought the idea to him as a pitch. He was charmed by the uplifting and universal appeal of the premise, which was reminiscent of many of his favorite films of the 1930s and '40s. With a screenplay by David Diamond and David Weissman in hand, the filmmakers began to look for a director who could present the different elements of the material while maintaining a tone of sincerity throughout. It was essential to everyone involved that the story not pass judgment on either of the two different lifestyles of Jack Campbell presented. "The Family Man is not about "good choice vs. bad choice" but rather about the nature of choices themselves" said co-writer Weissman. "The idea was about the path not taken."

Before Brett Ratner signed on to the project, the film was originally offered to director Curtis Hanson, who accepted. Ratner was in the middle of directing Rush Hour when his agent kept offering him scripts to consider directing. Ratner told his agent he was more interested in completing Rush Hour but near the end of the shoot for the film, his agent recommended that he read the script for The Family Man. Ratner originally was not interested in directing the film, but after he read the script, he immediately pursued it, saying "It reminded me of the classic films I grew up watching, except it didn't end the way most movies end and that was exciting. I felt this one in my gut. I always follow my instincts and I realized this was something that I really had to do." Ratner was convinced that he was the right choice to direct the film and set his sights on convincing the producers, mostly Abraham.

Abraham, however, was not sure about Ratner initially. Meanwhile, Hanson left the project to direct Wonder Boys instead. According to Abraham, "It just didn't seem like his kind of film. But after getting to know him during the entire year he stalked me, I finally figured that maybe he was the right guy for the job. He brought something really original and vibrant to the material". Ratner was officially signed on as the director after the success of Rush Hour.

Like director Ratner, star Nicolas Cage originally was not interested in doing a lighthearted romantic comedy drama, as he was focused on more serious roles such as in 8mm and Bringing out the Dead. He was also exhausted from filming Gone in 60 Seconds, but after seeing Rush Hour with his father, he accepted the part of Jack Campbell after finding himself inspired by Ratner's enthusiasm for the project. With Cage and director Ratner in place, the filmmakers needed to cast the role of Kate Reynolds, which was the most sought-after role for the film but a difficult one to cast. Both the filmmakers and Cage were impressed with Téa Leoni's ability to convey the intricate subtleties of the role.

=== Filming ===
Principal photography began on November 19, 1999, in Teaneck, New Jersey and Sleepy Hollow, New York, where fall foliage was still in evidence. Academy Award-winning special effects supervisor John Richardson, and his team had to transform the neighborhoods into a winter wonderland to set the snowbound Christmas scene. Filming finished on March 14, 2000. The Family Man was the first collaboration between Ratner and Academy Award-nominated cinematographer Dante Spinotti. They later worked together on Red Dragon, After the Sunset, X-Men: The Last Stand, Tower Heist and Hercules.

== Release ==
=== Box office ===
The Family Man opened at #3 at the North American box office making $15.1 million in its opening weekend, behind What Women Want and Cast Away, the latter of which opened at the top spot. After 15 weeks in release, the film grossed $75.8 million in the US and Canada and $49 million elsewhere, bringing the film's worldwide total to $124.8 million.

=== Critical reception ===
The Family Man received mixed reviews from critics. Rotten Tomatoes gave the film a score of 54% based on 130 reviews, with an average rating of 5.3/10. The site's consensus states: "The Family Man's earnest attempt to remind audiences that it's a wonderful life too often steers into schmaltz, although Nicolas Cage and Téa Leoni's romantic rapport adds a dash of sincere sweetness." Metacritic reports a 42 out of 100 rating based on 28 reviews, indicating "mixed or average reviews". Audiences polled by CinemaScore gave the film an average grade of "B+" on an A+ to F scale.

Chris Gore from Film Threat said: "If you're looking for a heartfelt, feel-good holiday movie, just give in and enjoy." Matthew Turner from ViewLondon said: "Perfect feel-good Christmas-period family entertainment. Highly recommended." Common Sense Media rated it four out of five stars. Movieguide.org rates it four of four stars, noting "The Family Man is a heart-rending movie. Very well written, it makes you laugh and cry. Better yet, it's an intentionally moral movie. It wants to prove that everyone needs love..."

Emma Cochrane from Empire wrote: "This is exactly the kind of adult fantasy you want to see at Christmas and, as such, it's highly enjoyable entertainment", and gave the film three stars out of five.

== See also ==
- List of Christmas films
