= Bad Samaritans (TV series) =

American sitcom

- Promotional poster
- Genre: Sitcom
- Starring: Brian Kubach; Julianna Guill; Tommy Snider; Alice Hunter; Robert LaSardo; David Faustino
- Composer: Mac Quayle
- Country of origin: United States
- Original language: English
- No. of seasons: 1
- No. of episodes: 5

Production
- Executive producer: Walt Becker
- Producers: Kelly Hayes; Ross Putman
- Running time: 30 minutes

Original release
- Network: Netflix
- Release: March 31, 2013

Bad Samaritans is an American sitcom produced by Walt Becker, Kelly Hayes, and Ross Putman. It premiered on Netflix on March 31, 2013, and various digital distribution platforms on April 2, 2013. Bad Samaritans is no longer available on Netflix.

== Premise ==
When Jake and Drew's anniversary picnic turns into a massive breakup that accidentally starts a raging wildfire, they are both sentenced to 2,000 hours of community service which they have to serve together. Each week, they join a ragtag group of degenerates that includes lifelong stoner Hagerty, aspiring socialite Trainy, former biker gang member Doug, and their Napoleonic parole officer Dax Wendell to complete degrading assignments. While performing menial tasks like assisting the elderly, picking up trash, and euthanizing dogs, Jake and Drew continue to deal with their breakup and the constant nightmare of doing the worst jobs in the world, for no money, with their ex.

== Cast and characters ==
The show focuses on a community service parole group and their parole officer.

- Brian Kubach as Jake Gibson, an aspiring professional StarCraft player who gets sentenced to 2000 hours of community service for starting a forest fire during his breakup with Drew. Prior to community service, he had no real ambition in life other than to be a professional gamer and become wealthy overnight like Mark Zuckerberg. As in life, his goal during community service is to get through it while doing as little as possible.
- Julianna Guill as Drew Finnegan, Jake's ex-girlfriend who has to serve the sentence with him. Drew is a graduate student and over-achiever who realized that she was wasting her life dating Jake for so many years. She sees herself as being above the rest of the gang and above parolees in general. Being in community service slowly leads her down the path of a mental breakdown.
- Tommy Snider as H.R Hagerty II Esq., a perpetually stoned community service lifer who doesn't seem to mind doing the time because he is usually too high to be upset. He tends to see the bright side in every horrible situation he's put in. Hagerty becomes Jake's confidant in relationship matters, usually doling out bad advice and getting others to join in on his half-baked schemes.
- Alice Hunter as Tina "Trainy" Tyson, the aspiring socialite who is stuck doing community service after being cut off by her wealthy father. Trainy is vain, superficial, and narcissistic but still tends to act less selfish than both Jake and Drew. Her goal in life is to find a sugar daddy and she'll sleep with anyone to who she thinks has something to offer her, usually money.
- Robert LaSardo as Doug, a former member of a violent biker gang. Doug has turned a new leaf and despite his tattoos and scary demeanor, he is very polite and has a zen philosophy. It turns out that Doug is not actually sentenced to community service, but volunteers to help people and to mitigate his bad karma. Despite his good intentions, he usually makes poor decisions along with the rest of the parolees.
- David Faustino as Dax Wendell, a pint-sized parole officer with a Napoleonic complex. Wendell dreams of being a real cop but can't make it into the force so he tries to compensate by ruling his parolees with an iron fist. He tends to end up in situations where he gets horribly injured thanks to his bravado, which leads to him getting less and less respect from the gang.

== Episodes ==
No.	Title	Directed by	Written by	Original release date	Prod. code
1	"Pilot"	Joe Burke	Arbi Pedrossian, Becky Bain, Michelle Lewis, Ryan Burns, Ryan Sandoval, Tim Saccardo & Worm Miller	March 31, 2013	UAG101
After their anniversary picnic gets out of control, Drew and Jake are sentenced to serve 2000 hours of community service. Their first assignment is at the retirement home where Drew's grandmother lives, and the two must go to great lengths to hide the fact that they've broken up.
2	"Dog Pound"	Jay Diaz	Arbi Pedrossian, Becky Bain & Michelle Lewis	March 31, 2013	UAG102
The gang gets assigned to work at an animal shelter. While Hagerty and Doug struggle to euthanize the strays, Jake tries to make Drew jealous.
3	"Trash Mountain"	JJ Adler	Soop Jones, Ryan Burns & Ryan Sandoval	March 31, 2013	UAG103
The gang must search through the woods for an important wedding ring, with the promise of halving their mandated community service hours. However, things get complicated when Hagerty finds psychedelic mushrooms.
4	"Middle School Detention"	Chris Jaymes	Arbi Pedrossian & Worm Miller	March 31, 2013	UAG104
The gang spends their Saturday watching over detention at a local Middle School Jake attended. What they originally expected to be an easy assignment turns hellish when the students are revealed to be sadistic brats.
5	"Wendell's Party"	Joe Burke	Arbi Pedrossian & Worm Miller	March 31, 2013	UAG105
After getting a new job as a police chief in Mexico, Wendell assigns the gang to cater his going-away party.
