= Adam Goldberg =

American actor (born 1970)

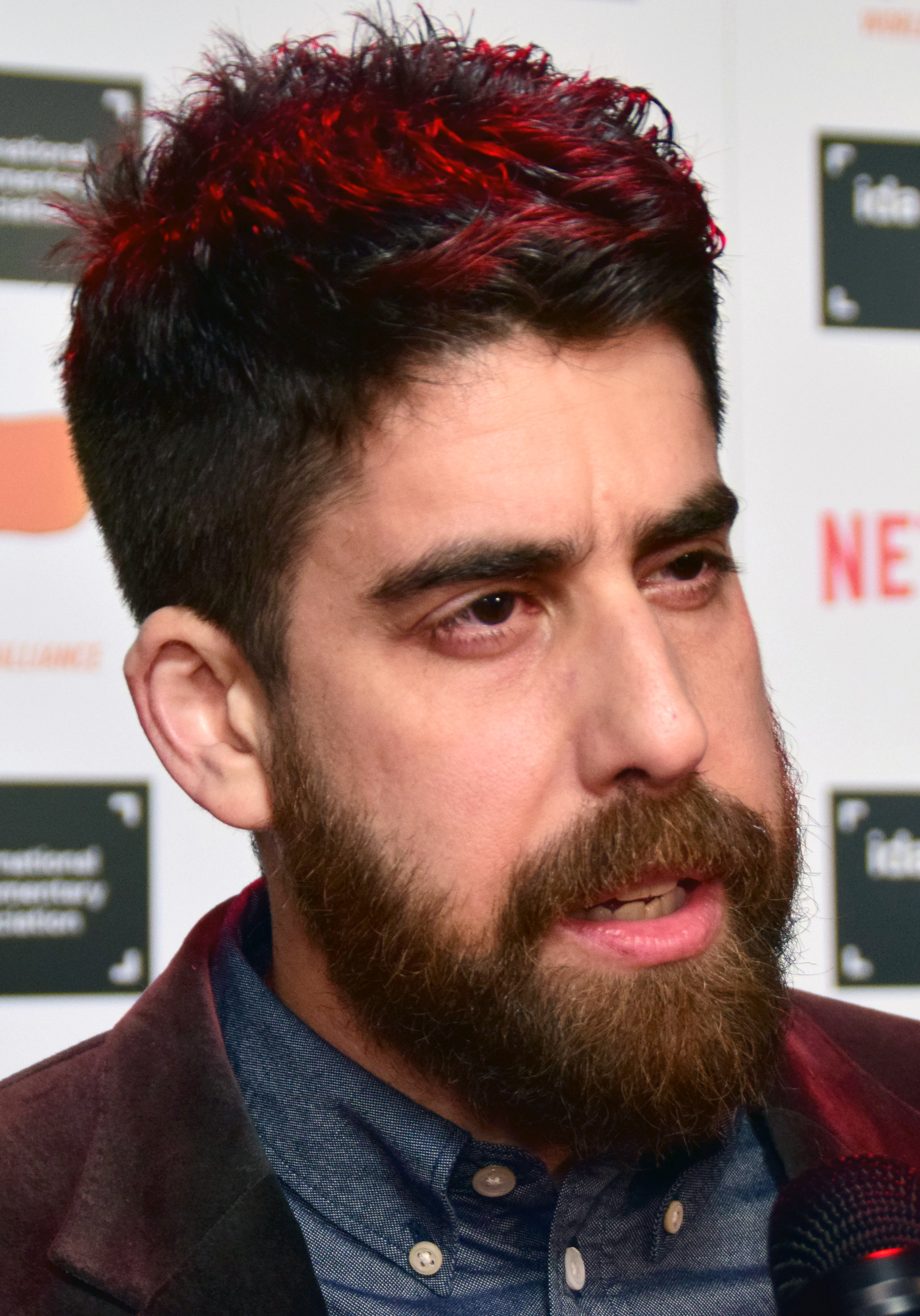
- Goldberg in 2015
- Born: October 25, 1970 (age 56); Santa Monica, California, U.S.
- Occupations: Actor; director; screenwriter
- Years active: 1990–present
- Spouse: Roxanne Daner (m. 2014)
- Children: 3

Adam Goldberg (born October 25, 1970) is an American actor. Known for his supporting roles in film and television, Goldberg has appeared in films such as Dazed and Confused, Saving Private Ryan, A Beautiful Mind and Zodiac. He has also played leading roles in independent films such as The Hebrew Hammer and 2 Days in Paris. His TV appearances include the shows Law & Order: Criminal Intent, My Name Is Earl, Friends, Joey, Entourage, The Jim Gaffigan Show, The Unusuals and his role as hitman Grady Numbers in the first season of Fargo. From 2021 until 2025 he starred opposite Queen Latifah on CBS' The Equalizer.

== Early life ==
Goldberg hails from Santa Monica, California. He is the son of Donna Gable, a psychologist, and Earl Goldberg, a former owner of Goldberg and Solovy Foods, a wholesale food business. His father is Jewish, while his mother is of German, French, Irish, and a "bit of Mexican" descent.

== Career ==
=== Film ===
Goldberg's first major screen role was in the Billy Crystal film Mr. Saturday Night (1992). His second major screen role was as Mike Newhouse in Richard Linklater's film Dazed and Confused (1993). His career-making role was arguably that of the tough, wise-cracking infantryman Stanley Mellish in Steven Spielberg's 1998 film Saving Private Ryan. While he played lead characters in The Hebrew Hammer, 2 Days in Paris, and (Untitled), Goldberg is mostly known for his character work in film and television.

Notable roles include Jerry, the undead servant to Christopher Walken's Angel Gabriel in the supernatural thriller The Prophecy; Sol in A Beautiful Mind, opposite Russell Crowe; and Denny in Déjà Vu, opposite Denzel Washington. Goldberg has also voice acted in Babe: Pig in the City, Homeward Bound II, and A Monster in Paris.

Goldberg appeared extensively in the Flaming Lips documentary The Fearless Freaks, and had a supporting role in Christmas on Mars, a science fiction film written and directed by Flaming Lips frontman Wayne Coyne. In 1999, he appeared in the Sixpence None The Richer music video "There She Goes".

Goldberg wrote, produced, directed, and edited the features Scotch and Milk, I Love Your Work, and No Way Jose as well as multiple television projects, notably including the philosophical travelogue Running with the Bulls for IFC.

=== Television ===
In 1995, Goldberg appeared in a signature wise-cracking role as delivery boy Leo in the television comedy Double Rush. Goldberg then appeared in a three-episode arc in the second season of Friends (1996) as Chandler's crazy roommate Eddie. He appeared some years later in a nine-episode arc in season two of the Friends spinoff show Joey as Jimmy, Joey Tribbiani's best friend from high school. He also appeared as a main character in the short-lived 2005 Fox series Head Cases.

In 1997, he received an exclusive series development deal with ABC.

Goldberg appeared in the short-lived ensemble cop show The Unusuals, playing a New York City detective with brain cancer who refuses treatment because of his dislike of doctors. His character was stated as being "sarcastic" and Goldberg had been described as "one of the better reasons to watch." He subsequently appeared in the short-lived ensemble cop show NYC 22.

In 2014, portrayed Mr. Numbers, one half of the hit man team in the first season of FX's Fargo. This was the second time working with creator Noah Hawley, who had cast Goldberg in 2009's The Unusuals. He had to learn American Sign Language for the role and began production just a few days after wrapping principal photography on his feature, No Way Jose. While shooting Fargo, Goldberg was also editing his feature and much of it was assembled in his hotel room in Calgary.

Goldberg played the role of Dave Marks, a struggling comedian and Jim Gaffigan's best friend, for two seasons on the TV Land sitcom The Jim Gaffigan Show. He shot the pilot during a week off from production on Fargo.

In 2017, Goldberg joined the cast of NBC's Taken as a regular cast member during the show's second season. He portrayed Kilroy, an accomplished computer hacker.

In 2019, Goldberg had a supporting role in the cast of CBS's God Friended Me as technical entrepreneur, Simon Hayes.

In 2020, Goldberg began production on CBS' The Equalizer, a reboot of the original. He played another hacker, this time opposite Queen Latifah.

=== Other ventures ===
A multi-instrumentalist and songwriter, Goldberg composed and arranged the music to the film I Love Your Work with Steven Drozd of The Flaming Lips as well as scoring his most recent feature, No Way Jose, and IFC's Running with the Bulls. He also provided a song for The Hebrew Hammer soundtrack.

Goldberg released his first album, Eros and Omissions, under the LANDy moniker. It was released on June 23, 2009. Flaming Lips drummer Steven Drozd, with whom Goldberg collaborated on the score for I Love Your Work, performed on the record as well as members of the band The Black Pine. Earlimart's Aaron Espinoza is credited as having done the final mix as well as having engineered many of the more recent songs. Goldberg has since changed his musical moniker to The Goldberg Sisters, under which he has made three albums, the last two of which he played every instrument save for strings (provided by his wife Roxanne Daner and musician Merritt Lear) and horns (provided by his engineer and co-producer Andrew Lynch).

On June 7, 2011, Goldberg assembled a live band to perform The Goldberg Sisters single "Shush" on The Late Late Show with Craig Ferguson.

Goldberg is also a photographer, shooting primarily on film and expired Polaroid. His first book was co-published by Hat and Beard Press and contained a limited vinyl version of The Goldberg Sisters' Home: A Nice Place to Visit. Subsequent exhibitions of photography from the book also included live performances of Goldberg Sisters songs by Goldberg and Lynch, utilizing several loop and effects pedals. An early adopter of the now-defunct Vine app, Goldberg was known for incorporating many analog film elements into his six-second "films." He was hired to do forty films for the French cellular company Orange during the 2013 Cannes Film Festival, during which he made a six-second Vine based on each film entered in competition. He is an avid Instagram user; his account consists of much of his photography while also hosting a cinematic narrative of his family life.

== Personal life ==
Goldberg has two children with his wife, artist and designer Roxanne Daner. Their first child together, a son, was stillborn. Their second son was born shortly thereafter, in November 2014. Goldberg and Daner married on Halloween in 2014. They had another son in September 2018.

== Filmography ==
=== Film ===
Year	Title	Role	Notes
1992	Mr. Saturday Night	Eugene Gimbel	
1993	Dazed and Confused	Mike Newhouse	
1993	Son in Law	Indian	
1995	Higher Learning	David Isaacs	
1995	The Prophecy	Jerry	
1996	Homeward Bound II: Lost in San Francisco	Pete	Voice only
1998	Scotch and Milk	Jim	
1998	Some Girl	Freud	
1998	Saving Private Ryan	Pvt. Stanley Mellish	
1998	Babe: Pig in the City	Flealick	Voice only
1999	EDtv	John	
2000	Sunset Strip	Marty Shapiro	
2001	Waking Life	One of Four Men	
2001	All Over the Guy	Brett Miles Sanford	
2001	Fast Sofa	Jack Weis	
2001	According to Spencer	Feldy	
2001	A Beautiful Mind	Sol	
2002	The Salton Sea	Kujo	
2003	The Hebrew Hammer	Mordechai Jefferson Carver	
2003	How to Lose a Guy in 10 Days	Tony	
2005	The Fearless Freaks	Himself	Documentary
2005	I Love Your Work		Director and writer only
2006	Man About Town	Phil Balow	
2006	Stay Alive	Miller Banks	
2006	Keeping Up with the Steins		Uncredited
2006	Déjà Vu	Dr. Alexander Denny	
2007	2 Days in Paris	Jack	
2007	Zodiac	Duffy Jennings	
2007	Nancy Drew	Arrogant Director Andy	
2008	From Within	Roy	
2008	Christmas on Mars	Dr. Scott Zero (A Mars Psychiatrist)	
2008	Kate Wakes	Jared	Short
2009	(Untitled)	Adrian Jacobs	
2009	Landy's BFF	Himself	
2010	Miss Nobody	Bill Malloy	
2010	Norman	Mr. Angelo	
2011	A Monster in Paris	Raoul	Voice only
2012	Lost Angeles	Deepak	
2015	No Way Jose	Jose	Also director
2016	Rebirth	Zack	
2016	Between Us	Liam	
2017	Once Upon a Time in Venice	Lou the Jew	
2019	Running with the Devil	The Snitch	
2024	The Exorcism	Peter	

=== Television ===
Year	Title	Role	Notes
1990	Designing Women	Student	1 episode
1995	Double Rush	Leo	Main cast
1995	ER	Joshua Shem	1 episode
1996	NYPD Blue	Reporter Dave Bloom	1 episode
1996	Space: Above and Beyond	Sgt. Louie Fox	1 episode
1996	Friends	Eddie Menuek	3 episodes
1996–1997	Relativity	Doug Kroll	Main cast
2000	The Outer Limits	Sid Camden / Chad Warner	1 episode
2000–2001	The $treet	Evan Mitchell	Main cast
2001	Will & Grace	Kevin Wolchek	1 episode
2004	Frankenstein	Detective Michael Sloane	TV movie
2005	Law & Order: Criminal Intent	Victor Garros	1 episode
2005	Head Cases	Russell Shultz	2 episodes
2005–2006	Joey	James "Jimmy" Costa	9 episodes
2006	My Name Is Earl	Philo	1 episode
2007	Medium	Bruce Rossiter	1 episode
2007	Entourage	Nick Rubenstein	4 episodes
2009	The Unusuals	Detective Eric Delahoy	Main cast
2009	Numb3rs	Chris McNall	1 episode
2011	White Collar	Jason Lang	1 episode
2012	NYC 22	Ray "Lazarus" Harper	Main role
2013	Animal Practice	Himself	1 episode
2013	Franklin & Bash	August West	1 episode
2013	The Anna Nicole Story	Howard K. Stern	TV movie
2014	Fargo	Grady Numbers	5 episodes
2015	Maron	Jack Ross	1 episode
2015–2016	The Jim Gaffigan Show	Dave Marks	Main cast
2017	Graves	Christopher Sachs	Regular cast; 2 episodes
2017	Lore	Peter Stumpp	Episode: "The Beast Within"
2018	Taken	Harden Kilroy	Regular cast
2019	God Friended Me	Simon Hayes	8 episodes
2021–2025	The Equalizer	Harry Keshegian	Regular cast
