= The Tiger Warrior =

2009 novel by David Gibbins

- First UK edition
- Author: David Gibbins
- Cover artist: Stephen Mulcahey, Ian Trower/Alamy and Sergiu Turcana/Alamy
- Language: English
- Series: Jack Howard series
- Genre: archaeological thriller
- Publisher: Headline (UK); Bantam Dell (US)
- Publication date: 2009
- Publication place: UK
- Media type: hardback, paperback and ebook
- Pages: 431 (hardback)
- ISBN: 978-0-7553-3518-3
- Preceded by: The Last Gospel
- Followed by: The Mask of Troy

The Tiger Warrior is an archaeological adventure novel by David Gibbins. First published in 2009, it is the fourth book in Gibbins' Jack Howard series. It has been published in 18 languages and was a New York Times bestseller .

== International editions ==
Among its foreign language editions, The Tiger Warrior is entitled Tigres de Guerre in France (Editions First), and Guardians of the Secret (Φύλακες του Μυστικού) in the Greek edition.
