= Walt Becker =

American filmmaker (born 1968)

- Born: Hollywood, California, U.S.
- Occupations: Filmmaker; novelist
- Years active: 2000–present
- Spouse: Lindsay Becker (m. 2005)

Walter William Becker is an American filmmaker and novelist, whose directorial credits include the films Van Wilder (2002), Wild Hogs (2007), and Old Dogs (2009).

== Early life and education ==
Becker was born in Hollywood, California and graduated from Pasadena High School (California) in 1986 and USC School of Cinema-Television in 1995, where he was a member of the Lambda Chi Alpha fraternity.

He also wrote the novel Link in 1998, which was on the Los Angeles Times' bestseller list for four weeks. It is based on some ideas of Graham Hancock, to whom he refers in the epilogue. He has a son and a daughter with his wife, Lindsay.

In January 2010, TBS picked up Glory Daze, a fraternity-centered comedy pilot set in the 1980s created and written by Becker and Michael LeSieur, to also be directed by Becker.

In January 2016, Becker is said to be working with Rome co-creator William J. Macdonald on a pilot for Storyville, which is based on the bestselling book Empire of Sin by Gary Krist.

In September 2017, Becker was hired to direct the 2021 film Clifford the Big Red Dog, replacing David Bowers. The film was released on November 10, 2021. Due to the COVID-19 pandemic, the film received a hybrid release in theaters and on the Paramount+ streaming service. Shortly after the film's release, it was announced that a sequel was in development.

== Filmography ==
=== Film ===
Year	Title	Director	Writer
2002	Van Wilder	Yes	No
2002	Buying the Cow	Yes	Yes
2007	Wild Hogs	Yes	No
2009	Old Dogs	Yes	No
2015	Alvin and the Chipmunks: The Road Chip	Yes	No
2021	Clifford the Big Red Dog	Yes	No

=== Television ===
Year	Title	Director	Writer	Notes
2007	1321 Clover	Yes	No	Television film
2010	Glory Days	Yes	Yes	3 episodes (director); 2 episodes (writer)
2013	Sullivan & Son	Yes	No	1 episode
2014–2015	Kirby Buckets	Yes	No	4 episodes
2022	Cut, Color, Murder	No	Yes	Television film

Producer

- Glory Days (2010) (3 episodes)
- Zookeeper (2011)
- Thunderballs (2011) (Television film)
- Bad Samaritans (2013) (2 episodes)
- Do It Yourself (2014) (Television film)

== Bibliography ==
- Link. HarperCollins. 1999. p. 384 pages. ISBN 0688158226.
