= The Odd Way Home =

- Film poster
- Directed by: Rajeev Nirmalakhandan
- Written by: Rajeev Nirmalakhandan, Jason Ronstadt
- Produced by: Patrick Nelson, Peter Touche
- Starring: Rumer Willis; Brendan Sexton III; Chris Marquette; Veronica Cartwright
- Cinematography: Matt Wilson
- Edited by: Ben La Marca
- Music by: Daniel James Chan
- Distributed by: Breaking Glass Pictures
- Release date: October 25, 2013 (Austin Film Festival)
- Running time: 87 minutes
- Country: United States
- Language: English

The Odd Way Home is a 2013 American independent film directed by Rajeev Nirmalakhandan. This drama follows a troubled woman, Maya (Rumer Willis), on the run from an abusive boyfriend, who accidentally robs an old woman and steals a delivery truck, only to find the back of the truck has been converted into a bedroom by Duncan (Chris Marquette), an autistic twenty-something. Through a picaresque road-trip to Duncan's only-living relative, the two develop a friendship and an understanding of what family really is. The film world premiered at the 2013 Austin Film Festival.

== Cast ==
- Rumer Willis as Maya
- Brendan Sexton III as Dave
- Chris Marquette as Duncan
- Veronica Cartwright as Francine
- Marya Beauvais as Kendra Richards
- Bruce Altman as James Richards
- Seth Adkins as Jeff Richards
- Chuck Miller as Hospital Administrator

== Release ==
The Odd Way Home was released on VOD by Breaking Glass Pictures on June 3, 2014. Many reviews compared the story to Rain Man or the Sundance hit Adam, though the film has a much lower budget than both. Variety said "the pic’s small scale, tight focus and generally low-key tenor lend it an attractive modesty that succeeds in tamping down the more melodramatic moments." The Washington Post noted the film "gets under your skin, thanks mainly to the nuanced performance of Chris Marquette", a feeling echoed by The Village Voice which said Marquette "elevates some ghastly material, bringing a human touch to the script's overripe yet hackneyed dialogue." The Hollywood Reporter was extremely negative, finding the film "riddled with cliches and hamstrung by a scattered script and often forced performances." In contrast, the reviews on the website Autism Today have been overwhelmingly positive, with some calling the film "beautifully written and expertly executed" and "The Odd Way Home is a movie that will stay with you for days."
