= Hello Again (2017 film) =

2017 film

- Theatrical release poster
- Directed by: Tom Gustafson
- Screenplay by: Cory Krueckeberg
- Based on: Hello Again by Michael John LaChiusa
- Produced by: Hunter Arnold; Ash Christian; Tom Gustafson; Cory Krueckeberg
- Starring: Sam Underwood; Nolan Gerard Funk; Jenna Ushkowitz; Tyler Blackburn; Al Calderon; Audra McDonald; Martha Plimpton; T. R. Knight; Rumer Willis; Cheyenne Jackson
- Cinematography: Austin F. Schmidt
- Edited by: Cory Krueckeberg
- Music by: Michael John LaChiusa
- Production companies: SPEAKproductions; Martian Entertainment
- Distributed by: The Orchard; ScreenVision Media; KAOS Connect
- Release date: November 8, 2017
- Running time: 105 minutes
- Country: United States
- Language: English

Hello Again is a 2017 American musical film directed by Tom Gustafson and written by Cory Krueckeberg. Based on the Off-Broadway musical of the same name by Michael John LaChiusa, the film stars Audra McDonald, Martha Plimpton, T. R. Knight, and Rumer Willis. The interconnected story is composed of 10 vignettes that follow lonely individuals pursuing romance across 10 different periods throughout New York City's history.

== Plot summary ==
=== The Whore and The Soldier ===
In 1901, an American soldier is walking through the streets of New York City at night when he is approached by a prostitute who flirts with him. She takes the soldier to a boathouse on the river, where they have sex. Afterward, she meekly asks him for pay, but the soldier coldly rebukes her and leaves. The prostitute is angry when she realizes he has stolen her jeweled brooch.

=== The Soldier and The Nurse ===
In 1942, a soldier goes to a party being held in an underground canteen. He notices a pretty nurse carrying a tray and begins flirting with her, asking her to spend the night with him as he is shipping out to war the next day. The nurse is shy at first, but eventually gives in, and they have sex outside in a car. The nurse asks the soldier to walk her home, but he leaves her sitting alone in the rain to get a drink.

=== The Nurse and The College Boy ===
In 1967, a nurse is hired to take care of a wealthy college student who has injured his ankle playing tennis. The boy awkwardly attempts to flirt with the nurse. When his mother leaves, the nurse surprises him by seducing him in his bedroom, even tying him up and gagging him during their romp. Afterwards, the boy jokes about no longer needing a nurse, offending her enough that she walks out, leaving him tied up.

=== The College Boy and The Young Wife ===
In 1929, a college student sneaks out to the movies to meet his lover, a young married woman. When she attempts to perform oral sex on him during the film, he is unable to get an erection, and privately admits to himself that he is only attracted to her when he cannot have her. She gets upset and tries to leave, but he convinces her that he loves her, and they try again. He eventually manages to climax, but when his lover asks him when they can next meet, he only makes vague promises before abruptly leaving.

=== The Young Wife and The Husband ===
In 1956, a married couple are getting ready to go see a play for their first anniversary. The wife, who is much younger than her husband, dresses in revealing lingerie and attempts to seduce him, but he acts uninterested, and talks about how sinful it is for people to desire "carnal gratification". The wife eventually asks her husband if he loves her, and although he claims he does, when she attempts to initiate sex he rebuffs her and goes upstairs to masturbate alone. The wife has a bath and sadly reminisces about a man named Tom she had met on the same day she met her husband, and wonders what her life would have been like if she had ended up with him instead.

=== The Husband and The Young Thing ===
In 1912, on the Titanic, a wealthy man traveling without his wife convinces an attractive servant to join him for dinner in his cabin. They talk, and the wealthy man begins to awkwardly flirt with the younger man. The younger man goes into the bathroom, when the ship strikes an iceberg and begins to sink. A deck hand warns them to get out, but the husband, seemingly on the verge of a total breakdown at the news, does not tell the young man what is happening and instead seduces him. The young man asks if he can join him when they arrive in New York, but the husband confesses the ship is sinking. The young man is furious and flees, running with all the other panicking passengers, while the husband chooses to die alone in the dark cabin.

=== The Young Thing and The Writer ===
In 1976, a wannabe filmmaker brings his camera into a nightclub where a wild party is ongoing. He spots an attractive younger man dancing and approaches him. The younger man acts coldly at first, until the filmmaker lies and says he is a Hollywood screenwriter working on a major film for Paul Newman, and agrees to go back to his apartment. The two men have passionate sex, and the filmmaker fantasizes about the two falling in love and eventually getting married; in reality, however, the filmmaker admits he lied about his work, causing the younger man to storm out of his apartment.

=== The Writer and The Actress ===
In 2002, a songwriter is helping his ex-girlfriend, a famous actress turned singer attempting to make a comeback in pop music, record a new song. The singer becomes irritated by the saccharine lyrics and the fact that her voice is being heavily auto-tuned. The two end up arguing over their old relationship, and the singer admits she is scared she will fail. The writer boosts her confidence by describing how sexy she is, and the two end up having sex in the recording studio. She then asks him to tell her he loves her, and he reminds her that she broke up with him, and admits to sleeping with her current lover. The writer walks out, leaving the singer in angry shock.

=== The Actress and The Politician ===
In 1989, a former actress is working as the adviser and public relations manager to a senator who is running for the presidency. The two women are also in a secret relationship. The actress is irritated that the senator has been drifting away from her and forcing her to keep their romance quiet. However, when the senator implies they may need to break up to further her political career, the actress claims she would be content to be her secret lover forever, and gives her a ring as a gift. The actress throws a successful party to earn voters for the senator, but when she tries to make dinner plans with the senator afterwards, she cuts their conversation short and leaves, much to the actresses' disappointment.

=== The Politician and The Whore ===
In 2012, a senator visits a unique whorehouse in which she talks to a masked male prostitute through a two-way camera. The senator asks the prostitute if he is happy doing what he does, but the prostitute refuses to answer, and asks her why she keeps coming to talk to him; she does not answer either. The senator describes a dream she had the previous night in which she woke up in a bed with a stranger - it is revealed to the audience that the dream involved waking up with the male prostitute, without his mask, and having an intimate conversation with him. In real life, the prostitute ends their session, and the senator leaves. She goes to get in her car, but changes her mind and begins walking down the streets of New York City. As she walks, each of the lovers from the various segments appears and sings to her, before the senator sees a man who looks exactly like how the prostitute appeared unmasked in her dream. They smile at each other before he walks away.

== Cast ==
- Sam Underwood as Leocadia (The Whore)
- Nolan Gerard Funk as Les (The Soldier)
- Jenna Ushkowitz as Marie (The Nurse)
- Al Calderon as Alfred (The College Boy)
- Rumer Willis as Emily (The Young Wife)
- T. R. Knight as Carl (The Husband)
- Tyler Blackburn as Jack (The Young Thing)
- Cheyenne Jackson as Robert (The Writer)
- Audra McDonald as Sally (The Actress)
- Martha Plimpton as Ruth (The Politician)

== Production ==
The film is an adaptation of the 1994 musical of the same name, which was in turn based on the 1897 play La Ronde. Principal photography on the film began on December 1, 2015 in New York City. The music and lyrics were created by Michael John LaChiusa. The film was produced by Ash Christian, Tom Gustafson, Cory Krueckeberg, and Hunter Arnold. Devon Schneider served as a co-producer.

== Release ==
The film had a limited release in the United States on November 8, 2017 io through ScreenVision Media and KAOS Connect.

== Reception ==
On the review aggregator website Rotten Tomatoes, 29% of 7 critics' reviews are positive, with an average rating of 4/10.
