= What Lies Ahead (film) =

- Directed by: Rob Gardner
- Written by: William J. Viglione
- Produced by: William J. Viglione; Rob Gardner; Joel Segal; Joe Burke
- Starring: Rumer Willis; Emma Dumont
- Release date: March 1, 2019
- Running time: 88 minutes
- Country: United States
- Language: English

What Lies Ahead is a 2019 American thriller film written by William J. Viglione, directed by Rob Gardner and starring Rumer Willis and Emma Dumont.

== Cast ==
- Rumer Willis as Raven
- Emma Dumont as Jessica
- Kelly Blatz as Kyle
- Katie Keene as Roommate
- James Harper as Buddy

== Production ==
In August 2016, it was announced that principal photography began in Kentucky. Filming occurred in Bardstown, Kentucky and Nelson County, Kentucky.

== Release ==
The film was released in select theaters on March 1, 2019 and on VOD and DVD on March 5, 2019.

== Reception ==
Bobby LePire of Film Threat rated the film a 6.5 out of 10.
