= Kelly Blatz =

American actor and musician

- Born: Kelly Steven Blatz; June 16, 1987 (age 38); Burbank, California, U.S.
- Other name: Scott Kid
- Occupations: Actor, musician
- Years active: 2004–present
- Television: Aaron Stone; Glory Daze
- Spouse: Evangeline Blatz (m. unknown)

Kelly Steven Blatz (born June 16, 1987) is an American actor, director, writer, producer, editor and musician.

== Career ==
Blatz made his acting debut in Simon Says (2006), then appeared in The 7 (2006). He appeared in the 2008 remake of Prom Night with Brittany Snow and Idris Elba. The same year he went on to play the psychopathic son of a preacher in Phedon Papamichael's intense thriller From Within with Thomas Dekker and Jared Harris, which premiered at the Tribeca Film Festival. In 2009, Blatz played the lead in the independent feature film April Showers, based on the Columbine shootings. He has since become known for his role as Aaron Stone in the Disney XD television show. In 2010, TBS cast him as the lead in their first hour-long comedy, Glory Daze. In 2012 he starred in the film Lost Angeles, where he played a homeless convict who gets caught up in the world of paparazzi.

In 2014, he was cast as the lead role in Marcus Nispel's Exeter. Following that, he starred in Charles Olivier Michaud's drama 4 Minute Mile alongside Richard Jenkins, Kim Basinger, and Analeigh Tipton. He played Drew Jacobs, a talented high school runner who is mentored by his neighbor (Jenkins) to escape a life of drugs alongside his brother (Cam Gigandet). Gary Goldstein of the Los Angeles Times called Blatz's performance "so deep and affecting it often evokes Timothy Hutton's Oscar-winning turn in "Ordinary People". The film premiered at the Seattle International Film Festival in June, 2014.

He was cast as the role of Brandon in the second season of AMC's Fear the Walking Dead in 2016. He also played John Wilkes Booth in NBC's series Timeless.

He starred in the horror film Hex set in Cambodia and co-starring Jenny Boyd and Ross McCall. In 2020, he starred opposite Jacqueline Bisset in the film Loren & Rose, written and directed by Russell Brown. He plays Loren, a promising young filmmaker who develops a friendship with an iconic actress.

== Directing ==
In 2015 he directed a series of short documentaries on numerous artists in Los Angeles. In that same year he co-directed, edited and starred in a narrative short film titled "The Stairs" co-starring Anthony Heald. The film won the Jim Teece Audience Award for best short film at the 2016 Ashland Independent Film Festival and the Special Jury Prize at the 2016 River's Edge International Film Festival.

He directed, co-wrote, produced and edited his first feature film titled Senior Love Triangle based on the award-winning documentary photo series by Isadora Kosofsky featured in TIME magazine. The film stars Tom Bower, Marlyn Mason and Anne Gee Byrd, and follows the romance between three senior citizens in East Hollywood. The film premiered at the 2019 Rhode Island Film Festival and went on to play at over twenty festivals, receiving numerous awards including Best Feature and Best Writing at Breckenridge Film Festival and Best Feature at Syracuse International Film Festival and Defy Film Festival. It was showcased at Newfilmmakers Los Angeles' October 2019 program and was nominated for Best Feature Film of the year. It was acquired by Gravitas Ventures and was released on August 4, 2020, to very positive reviews. The film has an approval rating of 100% on the review aggregator website Rotten Tomatoes.

He wrote and directed his second feature film titled One Fast Move starring KJ Apa, Eric Dane, Maia Reficco and Edward James Olmos. The film is an action drama about a young man down on his luck who seeks out his estranged father to help him pursue his dream of becoming a professional motorcycle racer. It was shot in Atlanta, Georgia and was released worldwide by Amazon MGM Studios on August 8, 2024. The film reached #1 Worldwide on Amazon Prime following its release.

== Music ==
Blatz was the lead singer in the band Capra for seven years, playing in numerous Los Angeles venues including The Viper Room and The House of Blues. The band self-released their first album in 2007 titled "Gypsy Jones". After signing to Hollywood Records, the band's single "Low Day" was featured in the movie "Skyrunners" which Blatz also starred in. "Low Day" was also featured in a national Expedia commercial and Guitar Hero 5. The band made a record with producer Matt Wallace. Before the record came out, Blatz left the band due to differences.

In 2011, he released two solo albums, Black Box and White Noise, under the name Scott Kid. The popular music blog Pigeons and Planes described his music as an "indie rock version of The Weeknd--like the chapter to a book that tells the story of courting, love, separation and the gritty rekindling of something forbidden."

In 2021, he released an acoustic EP titled "Uzes".

== Filmography ==
Film
Year	Title	Role	Notes
2006	Simon Says	Will	
2006	The Oakley Seven	Zeke Guthrie	
2008	From Within	Dylan	
2008	Prom Night	Michael Allen	
2008	Whore	Rapper #2	
2009	April Showers	Sean Ryan	
2009	Skyrunners	Nick Burns	
2012	Lost Angeles	Jared	
2013	Reaver	Chris	
2014	4 Minute Mile	Drew Jacobs	
2015	Exeter	Patrick	
2018	Hex	Ben Trepanier	
2019	What Lies Ahead	Kyle	
2020	Love By Drowning	Davis Martin	
2020	Sinister Savior	Daniel	
2022	Loren & Rose	Loren	

Television
Year	Title	Role	Notes
2007	Zoey 101	Gene	Episode: "Dance Contest"
2009–2010	Aaron Stone	Charlie Landers / Aaron Stone	Main role
2009	90210	Max	Episode: "Life's a Drag"
2009	Sonny with a Chance	James Conroy	Episode: "Sonny With a Chance of Dating"
2010–2011	Glory Daze	Joel Harrington	Main role
2013	Chicago Fire	Officer Elam Smith	Episode: "Let Her Go"
2014	Chicago P.D.	Officer Elam Smith	Episode: "Stepping Stone"
2015	NCIS	Petty Officer Kyle Friedgen	Episode: "Day in Court"
2016	Lucifer	Kevin	Episode: "Manly Whatnots"
2016	Fear the Walking Dead	Brandon Luke	4 episodes
2016	Timeless	John Wilkes Booth	Episode: "The Assassination of Abraham Lincoln"
2018	The Good Doctor	Aidan Coulter	Episode: "Heartfelt"
2019	S.W.A.T.	Kai	Episode: "Bad Faith"

== Awards and nominations ==
Year	Award	Category	Work	Result
2016	Ashland Independent Film Festival	Jim Teece Audience Award for Best Short Film	The Stairs	Won
2016	River's Edge International Film Festival	Special Jury Prize Best Short Film	The Stairs	Won
2016	Palm Beach International Film Festival	Best Short Film	The Stairs	Nominated
2019	Breckenridge Film Festival	Best Drama Feature	Senior Love Triangle	Won
2019	Breckenridge Film Festival	Best Writing	Senior Love Triangle	Won
2019	Syracuse International Film Festival	Best Feature Film	Senior Love Triangle	Won
2019	Burbank International Film Festival	Best Feature Film	Senior Love Triangle	Won
2019	Defy Film Festival	Best Feature Film	Senior Love Triangle	Won
2019	Another Hole in the Head Film Festival	Best Feature Film	Senior Love Triangle	Won
2019	NewFilmmakers Los Angeles	Best Feature Film of the Year	Senior Love Triangle	Nominated
2019	Film Threat Award This	Best Indie Feature Film of the Year	Senior Love Triangle	Nominated
2019	Film Threat Award This	Best Director	Senior Love Triangle	Nominated
