= Old Dogs (film) =

2009 film by Walt Becker

- Theatrical release poster
- Directed by: Walt Becker
- Written by: David Diamond; David Weissman
- Produced by: Andrew Panay; Robert L. Levy; Peter Abrams
- Starring: John Travolta; Robin Williams; Kelly Preston; Seth Green; Ella Bleu Travolta; Lori Loughlin; Matt Dillon
- Cinematography: Jeffrey L. Kimball
- Edited by: Tom Lewis; Ryan Folsey
- Music by: John Debney
- Production companies: Walt Disney Pictures; Tapestry Films
- Distributed by: Walt Disney Studios; Motion Pictures
- Release date: November 25, 2009
- Running time: 88 minutes
- Country: United States
- Language: English
- Budget: $35 million
- Box office: $96.8 million

Old Dogs is a 2009 American comedy film directed by Walt Becker, and starring John Travolta and Robin Williams, with Kelly Preston, Seth Green, Ella Bleu Travolta (in her film debut), Lori Loughlin, and Matt Dillon in supporting roles. The film is dedicated to both Bernie Mac (who died in 2008, making this movie as his final film role) and Jett Travolta (John Travolta and Kelly Preston's son and Ella Bleu Travolta's brother who died in 2009).

The film was released in theaters on November 25, 2009. It was panned by critics but grossed $96 million worldwide on a $35 million budget. At the 30th Golden Raspberry Awards ceremony, Old Dogs was nominated in four categories: Worst Picture, Worst Actor for John Travolta, Worst Supporting Actress for Kelly Preston and Worst Director for Walt Becker.

== Plot ==
Dan Rayburn and Charlie Reed are best friends and co-owners at a sports marketing firm. Seven years ago, Dan was briefly married to Vicki. In the present, Vicki resurfaces to tell Dan that their short marriage resulted in twins Zach and Emily. Vicki is facing jail for her work as an environmental activist. She asks Dan to take care of the kids while she does her time. Dan agrees, but only if Charlie helps him as neither have any experience taking care of kids. At the same time, they must finalize a deal with a Japanese company.

Charlie and Dan's attempts to take care of the kids are well-intentioned, but very awkward. An overnight camp instructor thinks that Dan and Charlie are homosexual partners. Later on, the kids accidentally spill Charlie and Dan's prescriptions and when they try to put them back, they end up mixing them up, leading to unexpected side effects for both men.

Desperate to help Dan communicate with the children, Charlie recruits his friend Jimmy Lunchbox, a famous children's entertainer. Jimmy straps Dan and Charlie in motion-controlled puppet suits so Charlie can help Dan make the right moves with his daughter while having a tea party. The suits malfunction, but Dan speaks from the heart, winning Emily over.

Vicki returns home. Dan and Charlie send their junior associate Craig to Tokyo and begin spending more time with the kids. However, Charlie and Dan receive news that Craig has gone missing, so they fly to Tokyo.

Once in Tokyo, Dan realizes he really wants to be a good father, and leaves the meeting without sealing the deal. They rush with Craig, who has returned from Tokyo, to Vermont for the kids' birthday party, but do not get into the Burlington Zoo in time and are forced to break in, encountering an affectionate gorilla and hostile penguins. Dan pays a birthday party performer hired by Vicki for his jet pack, flies into the party, and wins over his kids again.

One year later, Dan and Vicki are back together, Charlie is married, and Craig has become like an "uncle" to the kids.

== Cast ==
- Robin Williams as Dan Rayburn, the friend of Charlie
- John Travolta as Charlie Reed, the friend of Dan
- Kelly Preston as Vicki Greer, Dan's wife
- Seth Green as Craig White, Dan & Charlie's friend
- Ella Bleu Travolta as Emily Greer, Dan & Vicki's daughter and Zach's fraternal twin sister
- Lori Loughlin as Amanda, Charlie's love interest
- Conner Rayburn as Zach Greer, Dan & Vicki's son and Emily's fraternal twin brother
- Matt Dillon as Troop Leader Barry
- Rita Wilson as Jenna
- Bernie Mac as Jimmy Lunchbox
- Justin Long as Troop Leader Adam (uncredited)
- Dax Shepard as Child Proofer Gary (uncredited)
- Luis Guzmán as Child Proofer Nick (uncredited)
- Sab Shimono as Yoshiro Nishamura
- Kevin W. Yamada as Riku
- Ann-Margret as Martha
- Amy Sedaris as Condo Woman
- Laura Allen as Kelly
- Bradley Steven Perry as Soccer Kid
- Dylan Sprayberry as Soccer Kid
- Paulo Costanzo as Zoo Maintenance (uncredited)
- DeRay Davis as Zoo Security Guard (uncredited)
- Paul Thornton as Restaurant Patron (uncredited)
- Residente as Tattoo Artist
- Tom Woodruff Jr. as Gorilla, a zoo creature that encounters the "Old Dogs" and begins taking a liking to Craig

=== Muppet performers ===
The following performed the puppets in Jimmy Lunchbox's show and are credited as "Muppets":

- Bruce Connelly
- Josh Cohen
- Joe Kovacs
- John Kennedy
- Noel MacNeal
- Matt Vogel

== Production ==
In September 2005, it was reported that New Line Cinema had acquired a comedy pitch from writers David Diamond and David Weissman centering on boorish men similar in tone to Wedding Crashers to be produced by Tapestry Films. In July 2006, one week after assuming the duty as President of Walt Disney Pictures, Oren Aviv made a seven figure deal for the buddy comedy pitch, which Aviv described as having broad appeal while veering towards an adult audience. In April 2007, it was reported Robin Williams, John Travolta, and Kelly Preston had signed on to star in the film now titled Old Dogs to be directed by Walt Becker, who directed Travolta in Wild Hogs.

Canadian musician Bryan Adams wrote the theme song for the film, "You've Been a Friend to Me". The song became a Top 20 Adult Contemporary hit in his native Canada, reaching #13.

== Reception ==
=== Critical response ===
Old Dogs was panned by critics. On Rotten Tomatoes, the film holds a rating of 5%, based on 110 reviews, with an average rating of 2.70/10. The site's consensus reads, "Its cast tries hard, but Old Dogs is a predictable, nearly witless attempt at physical comedy and moral uplift that misses the mark on both counts." The film was ranked number three on their list of the ten most moldy films of 2009. At Metacritic, Old Dogs received an aggregated rating of 19 out of 100, based on 22 reviews, indicating "overwhelming dislike." Audiences polled by CinemaScore gave the film an average rating of "B+".

Film critic Roger Ebert gave Old Dogs a rating of one star out of a possible four. Ebert opened his review commenting, "Old Dogs is stupefying [sic] dimwitted. What were John Travolta and Robin Williams thinking of? Apparently their agents weren't perceptive enough to smell the screenplay in its advanced state of decomposition".

The Salt Lake Tribune gave Old Dogs a rating of zero stars out of a possible four, and criticized the film for "hammy acting and sledgehammer editing". Film critic Roger Moore of The Orlando Sentinel gave Old Dogs a rating of one and a half stars out of a possible four. "Trashing Old Dogs is a bit like kicking a puppy. But here goes. The new comedy from some of the folks who brought us Wild Hogs is badly written and broadly acted, shamelessly manipulative and not above stopping by the toilet for a laugh or two," wrote Moore.

Bill Goodykoontz of The Star Press gave the film a critical review, and commented, "Old Dogs, which stars Robin Williams and John Travolta as a couple of aging bachelors who suddenly have twins thrust upon them, delivers everything you’d expect. Which is: not much." He concluded his review with, "Let’s hope Williams, Travolta and the rest got a fabulous payday for Old Dogs. Because otherwise, you know, woof." In a review for The Arizona Republic, Goodykoontz gave the film a rating of one and a half stars out of a possible five.

Writing for the San Jose Mercury News in an analysis of movies released around Thanksgiving, Randy Myers placed Old Dogs below "The Scraps: Leftovers that should be immediately placed in Fido's bowl." Myers commented, "We have a winner in the Thanksgiving movie turkey contest." Dennis Harvey of Variety wrote, "Too bad this shrilly tuned comedy doesn't demand more than clock-punching effort from everyone involved." Tim Robey of The Telegraph savaged the film, saying, "Old Dogs is so singularly dreadful it halts time, folds space and plays havoc with the very notion of the self." He added, "Being a film critic is a wonderful job, but there are weeks when the bad film delirium strikes and we’d all be better off in straitjackets. A colleague opined to me the other day that this might be the deadliest run of releases in his 20-year history on the job, and I can completely see that." He also said, "You'd have to hate your family to take them to this!" He gave the film zero stars.

Writing for The Philadelphia Inquirer, Carrie Rickey gave the film a rating of two and a half stars out of four. Rickey commented of the multiple cameos in the film, "A child of 5 can see that these brief appearances serve to pad a gauze-thin script." The review concluded, "Old Dogs may not be good. But the sight of pesky penguins pecking Travolta and Green in the embrace of an unlikely partner makes it just good enough." Pete Hammond of Boxoffice gave the film 3/5 stars, and concluded, "Old Dogs may not reach the box office heights of Wild Hogs but its fun family friendly attitude should guarantee a healthy holiday haul."

=== Box office ===
On its first day, Old Dogs opened in fifth place, with a take of $3.1 million. It was beat in box office results by New Moon, The Blind Side, 2012, and Ninja Assassin. The film came in fourth in its second day with $4.1 million, for a two-day pickup of $7.2 million. The film remained in fourth place for its third day, with a box office take of $6.8 million. Overall, the film grossed $96,753,696 worldwide on a budget of $35,000,000.

The movie was also a moderate success on DVD, gaining more than $20,000,000 domestically during its first two months of release.
