= Kara Crane =

American actress

- Born: Orange County, California, U.S.
- Occupation: Actress
- Years active: 2006–present

Kara Crane is an American actress. She is best known for her role as Jeanette Pachelewski in the Disney Channel original film Minutemen.

== Career ==
Crane attended Orange County School of the Arts as a Music & Theatre major. She has guest starred in the television series The Suite Life on Deck, Bucket & Skinner's Epic Adventures, The Mindy Project, Awkward and Baby Daddy. She also starred in the Nickelodeon pilot "Summer Camp". She works as a buyer at the lifestyle subscription box service FabFitFun.

== Personal life ==
Kara Crane was born in Fountain Valley, California. In 2017, she married Kevin Basiago.

== Filmography ==
=== Film ===
Year	Title	Role	Notes
2013	Someone I Used to Know	Eli Lau	
2015	Little Christ	Shea	Short film

=== Television ===
Year	Title	Role	Notes
2006	Ned's Declassified School Survival Guide	Fashion Police #2	Episode: "Spirit Week & Clothes"
2008	Minutemen	Jeanette Pachelewski	Television film
2008	The Suite Life on Deck	Piper	Episode: "Broke N Yo-Yo"
2010	Summer Camp	Alyssa Beam	Television film
2012	The Mindy Project	Sophia	Episode: "Teen Patient"
2013	Bucket & Skinner's Epic Adventures	Leslie	Episode: "Epic Crush"
2014	Awkward	Britt	Episode: "Overnight"
2014	Baby Daddy	Heidi	Episode: "Strip or Treat"
2016-18	Mr. Student Body President	Trichelle	4 episodes
2019	Solve	Jasmine	Episode: “Prom Postal”
2019	Sydney to the Max	Abby	Episode: “Never Been Pierced”

=== Web ===
Year	Title	Role	Notes
2010	Sweety	Sissy Summers	6 episodes
2011	First Day 2: First Dance	Taylor	6 episodes
2012	Silverwood	Emily	Episode: "Silverwood Inn"
