= Lost Angeles =

- Film poster
- Directed by: Phedon Papamichael
- Screenplay by: Chris Merrill
- Produced by: Phedon Papamichael; Chris Gibbin; Adrian Butchart
- Starring: Kelly Blatz; Joelle Carter; Mark Boone Junior; Laura-Leigh; Seymour Cassel; Adam Goldberg; Grant Heslov; Caitriona Balfe
- Cinematography: Tari Segal
- Edited by: Grant Keiner
- Music by: Tom Hiel
- Production company: Burgundy Films
- Release date: September 16, 2012 (Oldenburg)
- Running time: 95 minutes
- Country: United States
- Language: English

Lost Angeles is a 2012 independent comedy-drama film directed by Phedon Papamichael, produced by Papamichael and Chris Gibbin, and written by Chris Merrill. It was shot on a mix of RedMX and Canon EOS 5D Mark II, over the course of 32 days in Los Angeles, California in 2010 and 2011.

Lost Angeles premiered at the 2012 Oldenburg International Film Festival, hosted in Oldenburg, Germany on September 12–16, 2012.

== Cast ==
- Kelly Blatz as Jared
- Joelle Carter as Jamie Furkes
- Mark Boone Junior as Stefan Snie
- Laura-Leigh as Hope Larson
- Seymour Cassel as the Film Critic
- Adam Goldberg as Deepak
- Grant Heslov as the Film Producer
- Caitriona Balfe as Veronique
- Alex Beh as the Film Director
- Ashley Hamilton as Bruce
- Timothy V. Murphy as Cliff
- Val Lauren as Mickey B
- Jasmine Dustin as Mimi
- Ricki Noel Lander as Somer
- Riker Lynch as Johnny
