= No Way Jose =

- Directed by: Adam Goldberg
- Written by: Adam Goldberg; Sarah Kate Levy
- Produced by: Tara L. Craig; Adam Goldberg; Tommy Levin; Paul Straw
- Starring: Adam Goldberg; Ahna O'Reilly; Pat Healy; Emily Osment; Gillian Jacobs
- Cinematography: Mark Putnam
- Edited by: Ivan Andrijanic
- Music by: Jonathan Zalben
- Distributed by: Destination Films
- Release date: July 7, 2015
- Running time: 98 minutes
- Country: United States
- Language: English

No Way Jose is a 2015 American comedy-drama film. Adam Goldberg directed the film from a screenplay that he co-wrote with Sarah Kate Levy. It stars Adam Goldberg, Ahna O'Reilly, Pat Healy, Emily Osment and Gillian Jacobs. The premiere of the movie in the United States was on July 7, 2015.

== Cast ==
- Adam Goldberg as Joseph "José" Stern
- Ahna O'Reilly as Dusty Morrison
- Pat Healy as Lawrence
- Emily Osment as Summer Stern
- Gillian Jacobs as Penny
- Eric Siegel as Gabe
- Anna Belknap as Kate
- Greg Pritikin as Mickey
- Kit Willesee as Shy Performer

== Marketing ==
On May 7, 2015, Sony Pictures Entertainment released the first teaser trailer for the movie on YouTube.
