= When in Rome (2010 film) =

2010 film by Mark Steven Johnson

- Theatrical release poster
- Directed by: Mark Steven Johnson
- Written by: David Diamond; David Weissman
- Produced by: Mark Steven Johnson; Gary Foster; Andrew Panay
- Starring: Kristen Bell; Josh Duhamel; Will Arnett; Jon Heder; Dax Shepard; Danny DeVito; Anjelica Huston
- Cinematography: John Bailey
- Edited by: Ryan Folsey
- Music by: Christopher Young
- Production company: Touchstone Pictures
- Distributed by: Walt Disney Studios Motion Pictures
- Release date: January 29, 2010
- Running time: 91 minutes
- Country: United States
- Language: English
- Budget: $28 million
- Box office: $43.1 million

When in Rome is a 2010 American romantic comedy film directed by Mark Steven Johnson and written by David Diamond and David Weissman. It stars Kristen Bell and Josh Duhamel. It was released by Walt Disney Studios Motion Pictures in the United States on January 29, 2010. The film received negative reviews from critics and grossed $43.1 million worldwide against a $28 million budget.

== Plot ==
Successful and single 29-year-old Beth, an art curator at the Guggenheim, is at a point in her life where love seems like a luxury she can't afford. Waiting for the "perfect" romance has embittered her. After flying to Rome to be the maid of honor in her younger sister Joan's impulsive wedding, she meets 26-year-old Nicholas Beamon, the best man. He rescues her in a couple of difficult situations but they are both clumsy. Still, they hit it off.

As Beth comes to believe in love again, she sees Nick kissing another woman. Slightly drunk and jealous at seeing Nick with another woman (who only very much later turns out to be the groom's "crazy cousin"), she picks up coins (a poker chip, a rare coin, a penny, a trick quarter and a Euro) from the "fountain of love" (based on the Trevi Fountain). Joan tells her that legend says if you take coins from the fountain, the owner of the coin will fall in love with you.

Beth is pursued back in New York City by a band of pushy suitors whose coins she gathered, including a diminutive sausage magnate Al, lanky street illusionist Lance, a doting painter Antonio, and a narcissistic male model Gale. She must return the coins to the fountain to break the spell. As she falls in love with Nick, she realizes that the poker chip belongs to him and is convinced that he is under a spell, not truly in love with her.

Joan calls Beth on the day of a gala and tells her that the spell can also be broken by returning the coins to the original owner. Stacey, Beth's secretary, concerned about her, overhears the conversation and steals the coins. She believes that Beth would lead a better life with people loving her, regardless of the spell.

When Beth's suitors all show up together at her apartment, she tells them she does not love them and plans to return their coins. She also tells them of her love for Nick, but realizes that Stacey has stolen the coins. She sets off to retrieve the coins, aided by her suitors. All pile into a yellow Vespa 400 microcar, which careens through city traffic, into the Guggenheim and up an elevator.

Stacey returns the coins and Beth gives them back to their respective owners. Left with the poker chip, she calls Nick and thanks him for making her believe in love again. Nick makes his way to the gala to search for Beth in a sudden lightning storm that hits New York. There he happens to pick up his poker chip, dropped by Beth, and convinces her his love was true.

On Beth and Nick's wedding day in Rome, Lance tells her he had several poker chips, and Nick did not break out of the spell. While exchanging wedding vows, Beth hesitates and dashes out of the church. She revisits the fountain and wades in again. Nick appears and joins her in the fountain. He said he had never thrown a chip in. He drops a poker chip in the water, and the priest is heard yelling, "Free of temptation!" Beth finally believes Nick and kisses him.

== Cast ==
- Kristen Bell as Elizabeth Ann "Beth" Martin, a successful art curator at the Guggenheim Museum in New York City.
- Josh Duhamel as Nick Beamon, the best man at Joan and Umberto's wedding.
- Alexis Dziena as Joan Martin, Beth's younger sister
- Peggy Lipton as Priscilla Martin, Beth and Joan's mother.
- Luca Calvani as Umberto, Joan's groom, whom she met on a business flight.
- Jon Heder as Lance, a street magician who uses his talents to try to get Beth
- Danny DeVito as Al Russo, another one of Beth's suitors and a sausage king.
- Dax Shepard as Gale, a self-absorbed suitor who falls under the spell of the coins and chases Beth
- Will Arnett as Antonio Donatelo, a.k.a. Anthony or Tony, a "wannabe" Italian artist who follows Beth to New York
- Anjelica Huston as Celeste, Beth's boss and director of the Guggenheim
- Kate Micucci as Stacey, Beth's co-worker and friend
- Don Johnson as Beth's father (uncredited)
- Lee Pace as Brady Sacks, Beth's ex-boyfriend
- Bobby Moynihan as Puck
- Kristen Schaal as Ilona
- Alexa Havins as Lacey
- Francesco De Vito as Taxi Driver.
- Shaquille O'Neal, Lawrence Taylor and David Lee appear as themselves.
- Efren Ramirez as Juan
- Keir O'Donnell as Priest (Father Dino)
- Ghostface Killah as event DJ

== Music ==
When in Rome: Music Original Motion Picture Soundtrack

Soundtrack album Digital download/Audio CD by Various
- Released: January 12, 2010
- Label: Atlantic Records

1. "Starstrukk" by 3OH!3 featuring Katy Perry
2. "Stupid Love Letter" by The Friday Night Boys
3. "Heart Bling" by Sofi Bonde
4. "Kickin' with You" by Jason Mraz
5. "Something Beautiful" by Needtobreathe
6. "How Far We've Come" by Matchbox Twenty
7. "I Am Changing" by Mafia Bianca
8. "Shine" by Laura Izibor
9. "Honey, Let Me Sing You a Song" by Matt Hires
10. "Hold On to Your Heart" by Tina Parol
11. "Fox on the Run" by The Academy Is...
12. "Pencil Full of Lead" by Paolo Nutini

Songs from film, but not on soundtrack

- "Make You Feel My Love" by Adele
- "Ave Maria" by the City of Prague Philharmonic Orchestra
- "If You Can Afford Me" by Katy Perry
- "Cherry Pie" by Warrant

The telephone call scene features the song "I Am Changing" by the Los Angeles band Mafia Bianca LLC, written and produced by Simone Sello and Steven Heinstein.

== Production ==
- Principal photography began on March 31, 2008, completed in July 2008. Filming took place in Trafford, Pennsylvania. In May and June, filming took place in New York City, Santa Clarita, California and Rome, Italy.
- To promote the film, Don Johnson and Jon Heder co-hosted WWE's Monday Night RAW on January 18, 2010.
- The 3OH!3 music video for "Starstrukk Remix" featuring Katy Perry was set around motifs seen in and clips around When in Rome, and the song was on the film's soundtrack.
- The Friday Night Boys used clips from the movie in their music video for "Stupid Love Letter", which was featured on the movie soundtrack and in some of the previews for the movie.

== Popular references ==
When Beth hands back the coins to Antonio, Lance, Gale, and Al, it is a parody of The Wizard of Oz, and Beth represents the Wizard giving each one something. Beth tells Gale that she will miss him "least of all". The line is a reversal of what Dorothy Gale says to the Scarecrow ("I'll miss you most of all") when she bids goodbye to him near the end of the film.

The plot of the film is the reverse of the 1954 film Three Coins in the Fountain about women in Rome who throw coins in a fountain and find love.

== Reception ==
=== Critical response ===
The film has received negative reviews from critics. Review aggregator Rotten Tomatoes reported that 17% of critics gave the film positive reviews based on 112 reviews with an average score of 3.41/10. The consensus states that "A pair of young, attractive leads can't overcome When in Rome's reliance on unfunny gags and threadbare rom-com clichés." Review aggregator, Metacritic, which assigns a weighted average of 0–100 of the top reviews from mainstream critics, gave the film a "generally unfavorable" score of 25% from 24 reviews.

James Berardinelli of ReelViews gave the film a positive review of 2.5 out of 4 stars, claiming, "The saving grace of the otherwise generic product is that Bell's vivacity and Duhamel's rakish charm allow the viewer to root for them, even if sometimes that rooting goes so far as to wish the script would serve the couple better than it does."

=== Box office ===
The film was released on January 29, 2010, and opened at #3 with $12,350,041 in United States and Canada behind Avatar and Edge of Darkness. It opened in 2,456 theaters, with an average of $5,029 per theater. The film grossed $32,680,633 domestically, $10,362,202 foreign and $43,042,835 worldwide.

== Home media ==
When in Rome was released June 15, 2010, on DVD and Blu-ray Disc.
