= Rumer Willis =

American actress (born 1988)

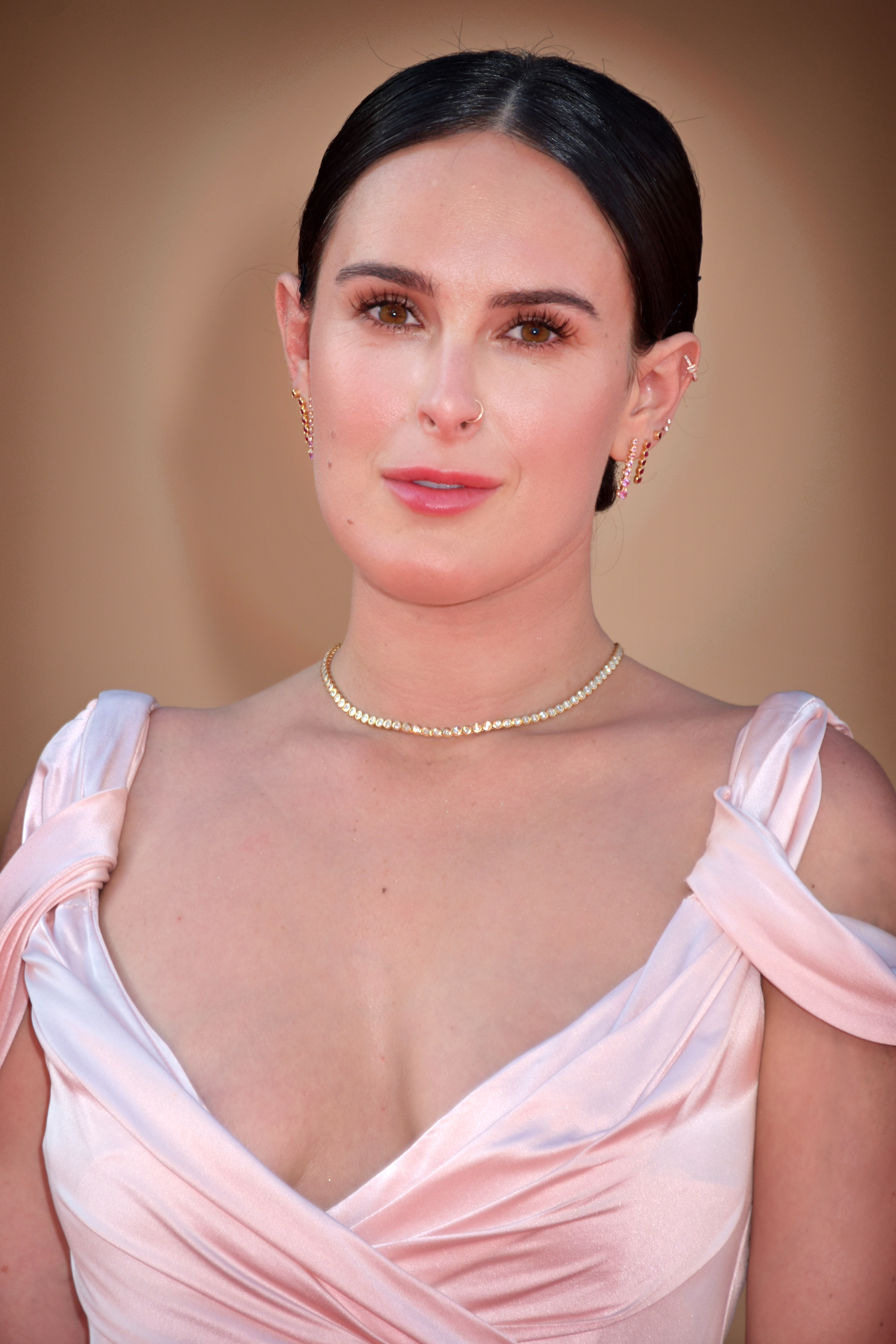
- Willis in 2019
- Born: Rumer Glenn Willis; August 16, 1988 (age 38); Paducah, Kentucky, U.S.
- Occupation: Actress
- Years active: 1995–present
- Partner: Derek Richard Thomas (2020–2024)
- Children: 1
- Parents: Demi Moore; Bruce Willis

Rumer Glenn Willis (born August 16, 1988) is an American actress. The eldest daughter of actors Bruce Willis and Demi Moore, she made her acting debut opposite her mother in the coming-of-age drama Now and Then (1995). She subsequently appeared in films such as Striptease (1996), Hostage (2005), The House Bunny (2008), Sorority Row (2009), and Once Upon a Time in Hollywood (2019). She portrayed Gia Mannetti on The CW teen drama series 90210 (2009–2010) and Tory Ash on the FOX musical drama series Empire (2017–2018). Willis won season 20 of the ABC dance competition television series Dancing with the Stars, and she made her Broadway debut as Roxie Hart in the musical Chicago on September 21, 2015.

== Early life ==
Rumer Glenn Willis was born on August 16, 1988, at Western Baptist Hospital in Paducah, Kentucky, while her father, Bruce Willis, was filming In Country. She was named after author Rumer Godden. Her mother, actress Demi Moore, hired a cameraman to videotape her birth. She has two younger sisters, Scout LaRue Willis (b. 1991), and Tallulah Belle Willis (b. 1994), as well as two younger paternal half-sisters from her father's marriage to model Emma Heming, born in April 2012 and May 2014.

Raised in Hailey, Idaho, Willis enrolled as a freshman at the Interlochen Arts Academy in Interlochen, Michigan. In January 2004, she enrolled as a sophomore at Wildwood Secondary School in Los Angeles, California. She attended the University of Southern California for one semester before dropping out.

== Career ==
In 1995, Willis made her film debut alongside her mother in Now and Then. The following year she appeared in Striptease (1996). She has worked with her father three times: in The Whole Nine Yards in 2000, Hostage in 2005 and Air Strike in 2018. She portrayed Joanne in the comedy film The House Bunny (2008) alongside Emma Stone, Colin Hanks and Anna Faris. The film was a commercial success, grossing $70 million worldwide. She played Natalie Wilburn in the horror film From Within (2008), which premiered at the Tribeca Film Festival on April 25, 2008. In 2009, she appeared in two films, the slasher film Sorority Row and the high school comedy film Wild Cherry. She won the "Breakthrough Performance Female" award at Young Hollywood Awards for her performance in Wild Cherry. She was nominated for "Choice Movie Actress: Horror/Thriller" at Teen Choice Awards for Sorority Row. In 2013, Willis landed the lead role of Maya in the drama film The Odd Way Home. She also appeared in films There's Always Woodstock (2014), Return to Sender (2014), The Escort (2015) and Hello Again (2017).

She had guest roles in television shows Miss Guided, Army Wives, CSI: NY, Medium, The Secret Life of the American Teenager, Hawaii Five-0 and Workaholics. Willis portrayed Gia Mannetti in ten episodes of the teen drama television series 90210 (2009–2010). In May 2013, The Hollywood Reporter announced that Willis will portray Zoe in the fourth season of Freeform's teen drama series Pretty Little Liars. She was a judge at Miss USA beauty pageant in 2014. In May 2015, Willis and professional dancer Valentin Chmerkovskiy won season 20 of ABC's dance competition television series Dancing with the Stars. From September 21 to November 1, 2015, Willis starred as Roxie Hart in Chicago on Broadway. W magazine noted that the past six months have been "a major breakout" for Willis." W magazine praised "her astonishing routines on the spring season of the show Dancing with the Stars, which she won with her partner Valentin Chmerkovskiy, that propelled Willis to new heights of fame. It also revealed the actress-singer to be a triple threat."

In 2016, she had a voice role on the stop-motion sketch comedy series Robot Chicken, in the episode "Yogurt in a Bag." On March 22, 2017, she had a recurring role in the third season of FOX's musical drama series Empire as Tory Ash. She became a series regular in Empire during the show's fourth season. In 2019, she appeared as a guest co-host in three episodes of CBS' talk show The Talk.

On February 20, 2019, she was revealed to be "Lion" on the first season of Fox's reality singing competition series The Masked Singer. She finished in the fifth place. Entertainment Weekly wrote that "Willis had commanded the stage with her vocal prowess and magnetic presence during the last eight weeks of the competition, proving time and again how powerful and versatile her singing skills truly are." Willis portrayed Joanna Pettet in the comedy drama film Once Upon a Time in Hollywood (2019) written and directed by Quentin Tarantino. The film has grossed $368.9 million worldwide, with The Hollywood Reporter writing that critics had "an overall positive view" of the film, calling it "Tarantino's love letter to '60s L.A." She portrayed sex worker Kayla in the social impact film Maya (2023), which raises awareness on child trafficking, domestic violence, alcoholism and child abuse. Inspired by real events, the film shows how predators use social media to lure teenagers. The film was met with positive reviews from critics, Film Threat writing: "Maya is an important film with great value for those who need to learn about this highly destructive underworld in our society."

She plays Ren in the comedy film My Divorce Party (2024), which follows a group of friends celebrating soon-to-be divorced Xan's, played by Desiree Staples, split. Xan decides to burn her divorce settlement money, but each friend has a different plan in mind. Written and directed by Heidi Weitzer, the film is set to be released on April 20, 2024.

=== Other ventures ===
She has appeared on the cover of several magazines, such as Page Six, Prestige, Us Weekly and The House Magazine and pictorials for Vanity Fair, Harper's Bazaar and The Sunday Times. In 2008, Willis ventured into the role of spokesperson for clothing brand Ocean Pacific.

In August 2023, the nursery at her house was featured in an issue of Architectural Digest. In November 2023, she partnered with Bumpsuit to create a baby carrier, titled Rumer Willis ‘Lou Blue’ x Bumpsuit.

=== Dancing with the Stars ===
On February 24, 2015, Willis was announced as one of the celebrities to compete on season 20 of Dancing with the Stars. Her professional partner was Valentin Chmerkovskiy. Her performance during week 1 earned her the highest score of the night (32 out of 40), and her performance during two rounds of competition in week 8 landed her two perfect scores.

On May 19, 2015, Willis and Chmerkovskiy were crowned the season's champions, winning over singer and actor Riker Lynch and army veteran Noah Galloway who took second and third place, respectively. Willis joined partner Valentin Chmerkovskiy and other Dancing with the Stars professionals on the 40-city "Dancing with the Stars: Perfect 10 Tour" during the summer of 2015.

Week #	Dance/Song	Judges' score				Result
Week #	Dance/Song	Inaba	Goodman	Hough	Tonioli	Result
1	Foxtrot / "Take Me to Church"	8	8	8	8	No Elimination
2	Cha-cha-cha / "Rumour Has It"	8	8	8	8	Safe
3	Salsa / "Turn The Beat Around"	8	9	8	9	Safe
4	Waltz / "Turning Tables"	9	8	9	9	Safe
5	Samba / "Poor Unfortunate Souls"	10	9	10	10	Safe
6	Jazz / "Bootylicious"; Team Freestyle / "Trouble"	8; 10	8; 9	7; 10	8; 10	Safe
7	Jive / "Dear Future Husband"; Foxtrot Dance-Off / "Orange Colored Sky"	8 Awarded	9; 2	9 Extra	9 Points	Last to be called safe
8	Rumba / "Perhaps, Perhaps, Perhaps"; Paso Doble (Trio Challenge) / "Scott & Fran's Paso Doble"	10; 10	10; 10	10; 10	10; 10	Safe
9 Semi-finals	Viennese Waltz / "Earned It"; Contemporary / "Theme from Swan Lake, Op. 20"	10; 10	9; 10	9; 10	10; 10	Last to be called safe
10; Finals	Foxtrot / "Take Me to Church"; Freestyle / "Toxic"; Foxtrot & Paso Doble (fusion) / "Take You Higher"	10; 10; 10	10; 10; 10	10; 10; 10	10; 10; 10	Winner

== Personal life ==
From 2020 to 2024, Willis was in a relationship with singer Derek Richard Thomas. On April 18, 2023, she gave birth to a daughter.

== Filmography ==
=== Film ===
Year	Title	Role	Notes
1995	Now and Then	Angela Albertson	Credited as Willa Glen
1996	Striptease	Angela Grant	Credited as Willa Glen
2000	The Whole Nine Yards	Girl Running Between Jimmy and Oz	Uncredited
2005	Hostage	Amanda Tally	
2008	From Within	Natalie	
2008	The House Bunny	Joanne	
2008	Streak	Drea	Short film
2008	Whore	Smoking Girl	
2009	Wild Cherry	Katelyn Chase	
2009	Sorority Row	Ellie Morris	
2012	Six Letter Word	Zoe	Short film
2012	The Diary of Preston Plummer	Kate Cather	
2013	The Ganzfeld Experiment	Lucky	
2013	The Odd Way Home	Maya	
2014	Return to Sender	Darlene	
2014	There's Always Woodstock	Emily	
2015	The Escort	Dana	
2017	Hello Again	Emily	
2018	Woman on the Edge	Susan	
2018	Da hong zha	Julia	
2018	Future World	Rosie	
2018	Air Strike	Nurse Julia	
2019	What Lies Ahead	Raven	
2019	Once Upon a Time in Hollywood	Joanna Pettet	
2023	Hidden Exposure	Alvy Bowman Abbott	
2023	Maya	Kayla	
2024	My Divorce Party	Ren	
TBA	The Gun on Second Street	Ashley Pullman	

=== TV ===
Year	Title	Role	Notes
2008	Miss Guided	Shawna	Episode: "Frenemies"
2008	Army Wives	Renee Talbott	Episode: "Transitions"
2008	CSI: NY	Mackendra Taylor	Episode: "My Name Is Mac Taylor"
2009	Medium	Bethany Simmons	Episode: "The First Bite Is the Deepest"
2009	The Secret Life of the American Teenager	Heather	Episode: "Knocked Up, Who's There?"
2009–2010	90210	Gia Mannetti	Recurring role; 10 episodes
2012	Workaholics	Lisa	Episode: "True Dromance"
2012–2013	Hawaii Five-0	Sabrina Lane	Guest role; 2 episodes
2013	Pretty Little Liars	Zoe	Episode: "The Guilty Girl's Handbook"
2014	Miss USA	Herself / Judge	Television special
2015	Dancing with the Stars	Herself / Contestant	Season 20 Champion
2016	Robot Chicken	Lila, Kathy, Clawdeen Wolf	Voice role; episode: "Yogurt in a Bag"
2017	Lip Sync Battle	Herself / Competitor	Episode: "Rumer Willis vs. Bryshere Gray"
2017–2018	Empire	Tory Ash	22 episodes
2019	The Masked Singer	Lion	7 episodes
2020	Floored	Herself / Guest Judge	Episode: "Tapped Out!"
2020	Barkitecture	Herself	Episode: "Rumer Willis: Canine Camper"
2020	9-1-1	Georgia	Episode: "What's Next"
2023	Name That Tune	Herself / Contestant	Episode: "Girls Just Want to Have Fun"
2025	Dr. Odyssey	Josie	Episode: "Shark Attack! Part 1 and 2"

=== Music Videos ===
Year	Title	Artist
2007	"Still in Love with You"	Five A.M.
2009	"Get U Home"	Shwayze
2014	"Imagine" (UNICEF: World version)	Various
2017	"Crazy Crazy 4 U"	Cast of Empire featuring Rumer Willis
2018	"SOS"	Cher

Awards and achievements
Preceded by Alfonso Ribeiro & Witney Carson	Dancing with the Stars (US) winners Season 20 (Spring 2015 with Valentin Chmerkovskiy)	Succeeded by Bindi Irwin and Derek Hough
