= The Last Gospel (novel) =

Book by David Gibbins

- Cover of first UK edition 2008
- Author: David Gibbins
- Cover artist: Stephen Mulcahey
- Language: English
- Series: Jack Howard series
- Genre: archaeological thriller
- Publisher: Headline (UK), Bantam Dell (US)
- Publication date: 2008
- Publication place: UK
- Media type: hardback, paperback and ebook
- Pages: 418 (hardback)
- ISBN: 978-0-7553-3514-5
- Preceded by: Crusader Gold
- Followed by: The Tiger Warrior

The Last Gospel (titled The Lost Tomb in the United States) is an archaeological adventure novel by David Gibbins. First published in 2008, it is the third book in Gibbins' Jack Howard series. It has been published in more than 20 languages and was a London Sunday Times top-ten bestseller and a New York Times top-ten bestseller.

== Plot ==
1st century CE: the lame Claudius, not yet Emperor of Rome, travels in the year 23 to Galilee where he meets a charismatic young carpenter, Joshua of Nazareth, and is inspired by his philosophy of heaven on earth. Claudius records the young carpenter’s words on a scroll that he takes back to Rome. Years later, after the Nazarene carpenter is crucified, Claudius becomes emperor. He fakes his own death, and disappears from imperial Rome to contrive an ingenuous plan to hide this secret gospel of Christ from those who would destroy it.

In the 21st century, archaeologist Jack Howard and his team of researchers first learn of this last gospel when excavating Claudius’s secret library near Pompeii. Following the trail of clues Claudius has left behind, their quest takes them from Italy to London, California, and finally Jerusalem. All the while, the mafia and elite Vatican City henchmen are hot on their heels, willing to stop at nothing to prevent Christ’s true message from being discovered. Eventually, they find the Gospel of Jesus.

The epilogue is the complete scene of Claudius meeting Joshua. The words of the last gospel are: “The Kingdom of heaven is on Earth. No one shall stand in the way of the word of God. There shall be no Priests. And there shall be no Temples.”

== Publications ==
Among its international editions The Last Gospel is titled Le Dernier Evangile in France and Il Vangelo proibito in Italy .
