= Henry Gale (British Army officer) =

British Army officer

Henry John Gordon Gale
- Born: July 3, 1883
- Died: August 12, 1944 (aged 61)
- Education: Malvern College; Royal Military Academy, Woolwich

Brigadier Henry John Gordon Gale DSO & Bar (3 July 1883 – 12 August 1944) was a British Army officer.

Gale was the son of a colonel in the Royal Engineers. He was educated at Malvern College and the Royal Military Academy, Woolwich and was commissioned second lieutenant in the Royal Garrison Artillery (later Royal Artillery) in December 1902. He was promoted lieutenant in December 1905. In 1908, he was posted to the Hong Kong-Singapore Battalion and between November 1912 and 1916, he served with the Indian Mountain Artillery in the North-West Frontier Province of India. He was promoted captain in 1914. From 1916 to 1918, he served on the Western Front, where he was promoted major in June 1917, was wounded twice, mentioned in dispatches twice, and was awarded the Distinguished Service Order (DSO) in June 1918.

Gale then served in the Russian Civil War in 1919, for which he was awarded a bar to his DSO in January 1920. The citation reads:

Throughout the operations on the Kodish front between 28 and 30 August 1919, he showed great gallantry. He carried out the duties of F.O.O. [Forward Observation Officer], and, without any regard to his personal safety, remained near the enemy's wire, so as to be able to ensure the accuracy of the artillery fire.

In 1920 he returned to the North-West Frontier and the Indian Army Mountain Artillery, where he commanded a battery and then a brigade. He was promoted lieutenant-colonel in May 1932. In April 1936, he was promoted colonel and returned to England as Commander Royal Artillery (CRA) of the 43rd (Wessex) Division of the Territorial Army. He was promoted to the temporary rank of brigadier in November 1937 and retired in October 1939.

In 1940, he returned to the Army, but retired again in October 1942.

His great great nephew is the archaeologist and novelist David Gibbins.
