= Charles Gibbons (artist) =

Canadian abstract artist

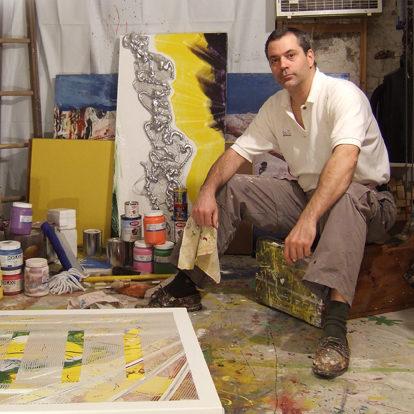
- Charles Gibbons in Studio
- Born: June 1, 1957 (age 69); Montreal, Quebec, Canada
- Education: Ryerson Polytechnical Institute, University of Manitoba, University of Calgary, City University
- Known for: painter and architect
- Movement: Modernism, abstract expressionism, geometric abstraction

Charles Gibbons (born June 1, 1957) is a Canadian abstract artist.

== Life ==
Gibbons was born in Montreal, Quebec and studied architecture, arts, and environmental psychology. He worked as an architect for several years, including apprenticing with Arthur Erickson Architects.

Initially he was influenced by the works of geometric abstractionists such as Sol LeWitt, Kenneth Noland, and Frank Stella. His first exhibition was in Calgary, Alberta featuring his geometric abstractions, while studying Environmental Psychology in the early 1980s. In the mid-1980s while working for Arthur Erickson he was influenced by abstract expressionists such as Mark Rothko, Barnett Newman, Jackson Pollock, and Sam Francis.

His current works are generally characterized as meaningful abstraction with bold contrasting colours. His works have been shown at the Toronto International Art Fair, Fort Myers Alliance for the Arts, Singapore International Contemporary Art Fair, and the Huitai National Art Center in China. He is represented in art collections in Canada, the United States, Japan, China, and Singapore.

== Works ==
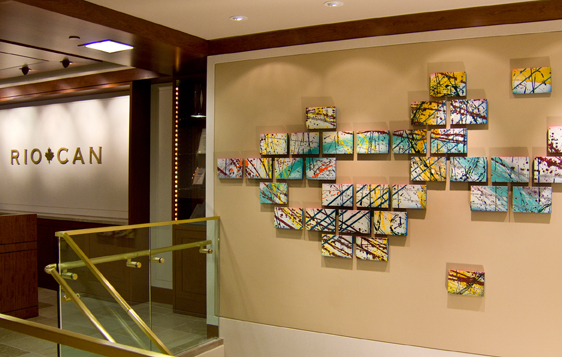
"Without Ends"

== Affiliations ==
- Visual Arts Ontario
- Alliance for Modern Art

== See also ==
- Abstract expressionism
- Tachisme
- Color field painting
- Lyrical Abstraction
- Action painting
- Art history
- Art periods
- De Stijl
- Geometric abstraction
- Hard-edge
- History of painting
- Abstraction in art
