= The Gods of Atlantis =

2011 novel by David Gibbins

- Cover of first UK edition 2011
- Author: David Gibbins
- Cover artist: Head Design
- Language: English
- Series: Jack Howard series
- Genre: archaeological thriller
- Publisher: Headline (UK); Bantam Dell (US)
- Publication date: 2011 (UK)
- Publication place: UK
- Media type: hardback, paperback, audiobook and ebook
- Pages: 436 (hardback)
- ISBN: 978-0-7553-5398-9
- Preceded by: The Mask of Troy
- Followed by: Pharaoh

The Gods of Atlantis (titled Atlantis God in the US) is an archaeological adventure novel by New York Times and London Sunday Times bestselling author David Gibbins. First published in 2011, it is the sixth book in Gibbins' Jack Howard series.

== Publication history ==
The book was published in the UK in hardback on 18 August 2011 and in paperback and as an ebook on 27 October 2011; the US edition (Atlantis God) was published in 2012, along with French, Greek and other translations.

== See also ==
- David Gibbins
