= Henry de Beltgens Gibbins =

English historian (1865–1907)

Henry de Beltgens Gibbins (1865–1907) was a popular historian of 19th century England whose books were bestsellers in the late Victorian period; his Industry in England went to ten editions over fifteen years, and was published internationally.

On his father's side he was from a Huguenot family which had moved from Hampshire to London in the late 18th century; his maternal grandfather Jean de Beltgens was a member of the House of Assembly in Dominica, West Indies. He was educated at Bradford Grammar School and at Wadham College, Oxford, where he was Cobden Prizeman, and he was later ordained and awarded a D.Litt. from University College Dublin. He was Assistant Master at Nottingham High School from 1889 to 1895, Vice-Principal of Liverpool College from 1895 to 1899 and then Headmaster of King Charles I School, Kidderminster. His final appointment in 1906 was as Principal of Bishop's University in Canada, but he resigned due to ill health and died soon after at the age of 42.

He was a prolific author, specializing in the economic, industrial and social history of England in the nineteenth century. As well as the books listed below, he edited Methuen's 'Social Questions of Today' series and their 'Commercial' series, contributed to Palgrave’s Dictionary of Political Economy and frequently wrote in the reviews.

He was married but had no children. His paternal grandfather, Samuel Gibbins (1808–1886), Master of the Carpenters' Company in London, also had a son John George Gibbins, FRIBA, a noted architect in Brighton, whose descendants include the archaeologist and novelist David Gibbins.

== Bibliography ==
- Gibbins, H. de B. 1890. Industrial History of England. London: University Extension Series.
- Gibbins, H. de B. and Hadfield, Sir Robert. 1891. A Shorter Working-Day. London.
- Gibbins, H. de B. 1896. Industry in England. London: Methuen.
- Gibbins, H. de B. 1891. The History of Commerce in Europe. London: Macmillan.
- Gibbins, H. de B. 1891. The Companion German Grammar. London: Methuen.
- Gibbins, H. de B. 1892. English Social Reformers. London: University Extension Series.
- Gibbins, H. de B. 1893. British Commerce and Colonies, from Elizabeth to Victoria. London: Methuen.
- Gibbins, H. de B. 1894. The Economics of Commerce. London: Methuen.
- Gibbins, H. de B. 1898. The English People in the Nineteenth Century: a Short History. London: A. & C. Black.
- Gibbins, H. de B. 1901. Economic and Industrial Progress of the Century. London: W. & R. Chambers.
- Gibbins, H. de B. 1903. A History of the Grammar School of Charles, King of England in Kidderminster. Kidderminster: privately printed.

== Sources ==
- Dictionary of National Biography
- The Times obituaries, 1907
