= David Gibbins =

Underwater archaeologist and novelist

- Born: 1962 (age 63–64); Saskatoon, Saskatchewan
- Education: University of Bristol (B.A.); Corpus Christi College, Cambridge (Ph.D.)
- Occupations: Novelist, archaeologist
- Children: one daughter
- Writing career
- Language: English
- Genres: archaeological and historical fiction
- Website: www.davidgibbins.com

David Gibbins (born 1962) is an underwater archaeologist and a bestselling novelist.

== Early life ==
Gibbins was born in 1962 in Saskatoon, Saskatchewan, Canada, to British parents who were academic scientists. He is related to the Victorian historian Henry de Beltgens Gibbins and to Brigadier Henry John Gordon Gale, DSO and Bar. After growing up in Canada, New Zealand, and England he attended the University of Bristol, where he was awarded a First Class Honours Degree in Ancient Mediterranean Studies. He spent part of 1984 in Turkey funded by a Travel Scholarship from the British Institute of Archaeology in Ankara. In 1984, he was awarded a Research Scholarship by Corpus Christi College, University of Cambridge, where he completed a PhD in archaeology in 1991.

He qualified as a scuba diver in Canada at the age of 15, and since then has dived extensively around the world.

== Career ==
=== Academic career ===
From 1991 to 1993, he held a Postdoctoral Fellowship at the University of Cambridge from the Canadian Social Sciences and Humanities Research Council. From 1993 to 2000, he was a lecturer in the School of Archaeology, Classics and Oriental Studies at the University of Liverpool, and from 1999 to 2001, he was an adjunct professor of the Institute of Nautical Archaeology. During the 1980s and 1990s, he led many expeditions to investigate ancient shipwrecks and submerged ruins in the Mediterranean, including Roman shipwrecks off Sicily and the harbour of ancient Carthage. In 1999–2000, he was part of an international team excavating a 5th-century BC shipwreck off Turkey. His publications on ancient shipwreck sites have appeared in scientific journals, books and popular magazines.

Since 2002, he had been a full-time writer and independent scholar. In 2015, he co-founded the research group Cornwall Maritime Archaeology, which has made numerous shipwreck discoveries off south-west England. In 2016, he rediscovered the wreck of the Schiedam, a ship involved in the evacuation of English Tangier in 1684 and associated with Samuel Pepys, and in 2018 the site of the President, an English East Indiaman. In 2019, on another wreck he discovered a unique 16th century copper-alloy statuette of the crucified Christ attributable to Guglielmo della Porta.

=== Writing ===
On leaving academia he became a novelist, writing archaeological thrillers derived from his own background. His novels have sold over three million copies and have been London Sunday Times and New York Times bestsellers. His first novel, Atlantis, published in the UK in 2005 and the US in 2006, was published in 30 languages. Since then he has written ten further novels which have been published in more than 200 editions internationally. His main series is based on the fictional maritime archaeologist Jack Howard and his team, and forms contemporary novels involving an archaeological backdrop. He has also written two historical novels set in ancient Rome.

== Honours ==
He is a Winston Churchill Memorial Trust Fellow, for which he received the Churchill Medallion of the Trust. He is a Fellow of the Royal Geographical Society and a Fellow of the Royal Society of Arts.

== Select bibliography ==
=== Fiction ===
==== Jack Howard series ====
1. Gibbins, David. 2005. Atlantis. London: Headline and New York: Bantam Dell. ISBN 978-0-7553-2422-4
2. Gibbins, David. 2006. Crusader Gold. London: Headline and New York: Bantam Dell. ISBN 978-0-7553-2927-4
3. Gibbins, David. 2008. The Last Gospel. (The Lost Tomb in US). London: Headline and New York: Bantam Dell. ISBN 978-0-7553-3514-5
4. Gibbins, David. 2009. The Tiger Warrior. London: Headline and New York: Bantam Dell. ISBN 978-0-553-59125-5
5. Gibbins, David. 2010. The Mask of Troy. London: Headline and New York: Bantam Dell. ISBN 978-0-7553-5395-8
6. Gibbins, David. 2011. The Gods of Atlantis. (Atlantis God in US). London: Headline and New York: Bantam Dell (2012). ISBN 978-0-7553-5398-9
7. Gibbins, David. 2013. Pharaoh. London: Headline and New York: Bantam Dell. ISBN 978-0-755-35403-0
8. Gibbins, David. 2014. Pyramid. London: Headline and New York: Bantam Dell. ISBN 978-0-755-35406-1
9. Gibbins, David. 2016. Testament. London: Headline and New York: Thomas Dunne Books. ISBN 978-1-4722-3019-5
10. Gibbins, David. 2018. Inquisition. London: Headline and New York: Thomas Dunne Books. ISBN 978-1-2500-8064-6

==== Total War Rome series ====
1. Gibbins, David. 2013. Destroy Carthage. London: Macmillan and New York: Thomas Dunne Books. ISBN 978-0-2307-7094-2
2. Gibbins, David. 2015. The Sword of Attila. London: Macmillan and New York: Thomas Dunne Books. ISBN 978-1-250-03895-1

=== Non-fiction ===
- Gibbins, David, 1988. "Surgical instruments from a Roman shipwreck off Sicily." Antiquity 62 (235), pp. 294–7.
- Edge, C.J. & Gibbins, D.J. 1989. "Underwater discovery of Roman surgical instruments", British Medical Journal. 298, pp. 1645-6.
- Gibbins, David. 1990. "The hidden museums of the Mediterranean." New Scientist 128 (1739), pp. 35–40.
- Gibbins, David and Christopher Chippindale (editors), 1990. "Maritime archaeology." Antiquity 64 (243), pp. 334–400.
- Gibbins, David, 1990. "Analytical approaches in maritime archaeology: a Mediterranean perspective". Antiquity 64 (243), pp. 376–389.
- Gibbins, David and Christopher Chippindale, 1990. "Heritage at sea: proposals for the better protection of British archaeological sites underwater". Antiquity 64 (243), pp. 390–400.
- Gibbins, David. 1993. "Bronze Age wreck's revelations." Illustrated London News 281 (7116), pp. 72–3.
- Gibbins, David, 1993. "Das im Mittelmeer verborgene Museum." Mannheimer Forum 92/93. Ein Panorama der Naturwissen schaften. Mannheim: Boehringer Mannheim, pp. 175–243.
- Gibbins, David, 1995. "What shipwrecks can tell us." Antiquity 69:263, pp. 408–411.
- Gibbins, David J.L., Mike M. Emery and Keith J. Mathews, 1996. The Archaeology of an Ecclesiastical Landscape. Chester Archaeology Excavation and Survey Report No. 9. Chester City Council/The University of Liverpool. ISBN 978-1-872587-09-7
- Gibbins, David, 1997. "Deleta est Carthago?" Antiquity 71 (271), pp. 217–219.
- Gibbins, David. 1998. "Maritime archaeology". in Shaw, I. and R. Jameson (editors) Dictionary of Archaeology. Oxford: Blackwell. ISBN 978-0-631-17423-3
- Gibbins, David. 2000. "Classical shipwreck excavation at Tektas Burnu, Turkey." Antiquity 74:283, pp. 199–201.
- Gibbins, David. 2001. "Shipwrecks and Hellenistic trade." in Zofia H. Archibald et al. (editors), Hellenistic Economies. London/New York: Routledge, pp. 273–312. ISBN 978-0-415-23466-5
- Gibbins, David and Jonathan Adams (editors), 2001. Shipwrecks. World Archaeology 32.3. London: Routledge. ISSN 0043-8243
- Gibbins, David and Jonathan Adams, 2001. "Shipwrecks and maritime archaeology." World Archaeology, 32:3, pp. 279–291.
- Gibbins, David. 2001. "A Roman shipwreck of c. AD 200 at Plemmirio, Sicily: evidence for north African amphora production during the Severan period." World Archaeology 32.3, pp. 311–334.
- Gibbins, David. 2019. "The 9th Lancers and the assault on the 'Quadrilateral' during the Battle of the Somme, 15 September 1916. The Chapka (Regimental Journal of the Royal Lancers (Queen Elizabeth's Own)) 2018: 138–41.
