= Chris Gibbin =

American film producer

Chris Gibbin is an American filmmaker, producer and entrepreneur whose first feature film, From Within, had its worldwide premiere at the 2008 Tribeca Film Festival and went on to win the 2008 Grand Jury Prize at the Solstice Film Festival. Lost Angeles, his second feature film, starring Joelle Carter and Kelly Blatz, had its world premiere at the Oldenburg International Film Festival in 2012.

== Biography ==
In 1996, Gibbin founded DNA Studio, a Los Angeles-based online advertising agency. In 2006 Gibbin sold DNA to Whittman-Hart. Gibbin founded Something Massive in 2009 with partners John Moshay and Rebecca Coleman.

Chris was the producer behind Carmen Electra's line of Aerobic Striptease fitness videos and Paula Abdul's Cardio Cheer DVD series. In 2007, Gibbin produced the independent thriller From Within, directed by Phedon Papamichael and released by Lionsgate Entertainment. It was the 2008 Grand Jury Award Winner at the Solstice Film Festival and was included in the 2008 After Dark "8 Films to Die For" festival.

In 2011, Gibbin and Papamichael produced the independent comedy-drama Lost Angeles. The film premiered at the Oldenburg International Film Festival on September 16, 2012. In 2014 Chris Gibbin wrote and directed Buddy starring Joelle Carter and Ryan O'Nan, a short film that premiered at the St. Tropez International Film Festival.

== Filmography ==
- Advanced Filmmaking - Producer, 2014
- Buddy - Writer/Director, 2013
- Lost Angeles - Producer, 2012
- From Within - Producer, 2008
- Dewmocracy - Executive Producer, 2008
- Carmen Electra's Aerobic Striptease - Executive Producer, Director, 2007
- Envy - Executive Producer, 2007
- Paula Abdul: Cardio Cheer - Executive Producer, Director 2005
- MDN - Executive Producer, 2004
