= Charles William Gibbings =

Canadian academic (1916–2009)

Charles William Gibbings (1916-2009) was born on a farm near Rosetown, Saskatchewan, Canada, on August 10, 1916. After earning a BSc in Agriculture at the University of Saskatchewan, Gibbings taught at the University's School of Agriculture and conducted youth training programs across the province, both while continuing to farm.

== Career ==
In 1946 Gibbings was elected as a delegate to the Saskatchewan Wheat Pool; within six years he was on the board of directors and three years after that became vice-president. In 1960 he became the Pool's first Saskatchewan-born president and served as such until 1969. In that capacity Gibbings hired its first general manager and reinforced the management team by hiring employees who had been trained in accounting and other management skills. The Farm Service Division, which dealt with production supplies and services, was also added and agrologists were hired to work directly with farmers — at that time an innovation in the grain elevator business. During his presidency Gibbings worked hard to knit the four prairie grain elevator Co-operatives into one; it was his view that the Alberta Wheat Pool, Saskatchewan Wheat Pool, Manitoba Wheat Pool and the United Grain Growers should amalgamate to better serve prairie farmers. He did not succeed in this endeavour, but there is evidence of some collaboration: all four organizations became members of X-CAN Grain Limited, a company established to market grains not covered under the Canadian Wheat Board. Furthermore, the Pools joined with Federated Co-operatives in the manufacture and supply of fertilizers and agricultural chemicals.

Gibbings advised Canadian delegations involved in the negotiation of international agricultural trade terms. He served as a commissioner on the Saskatchewan Royal Commission on Agriculture and Rural Life, and was a member of the University of Saskatchewan Senate. He was president of Co-operative Fire and Casualty and served on the boards of the Regina Exhibition and Saskatchewan Research Council. He was also chairman of the Advisory Committee to the Canadian Wheat Board. Gibbings left his position as Pool president in 1969 to become a commissioner of the Canadian Wheat Board; in this role he travelled the world helping negotiate sales of prairie grains. Among the many honours he received was the Canada Centennial Medal in 1967. He was also named a Fellow of the Agricultural Institute of Canada in 1967 and awarded an honorary Doctor of Laws degree by the University of Saskatchewan in 1971. He was inducted into the Saskatchewan Agricultural Hall of Fame in 1986.

== Late life ==
Charles Gibbings retired in British Columbia, Canada, where he continued to enjoy his pastimes of golf, billiards and watching baseball. He died August 1, 2009, in Kelowna, British Columbia, Canada.
