= Goal! (film series) =

Goal! trilogy
- Directed by: Goal!: Danny Cannon Goal II: Living the Dream: Jaume Collet-Serra Goal III: Taking on the World: Andrew Morahan
- Written by: Goal!: Mike Jefferies & Adrian Butchart; Dick Clement & Ian La Frenais Goal II: Living the Dream: Mike Jefferies & Adrian Butchart; Terry Loane Goal III: Taking on the World: Mike Jefferies & Piers Ashworth
- Produced by: Goal! & Goal II: Living the Dream: Mike Jefferies & Matt Barrelle; Mark Huffam Goal III: Taking on the World: Mike Jefferies & Matt Barrelle; Danny Stepper & Peter Heslop
- Starring: Kuno Becker; Alessandro Nivola; Stephen Dillane; Anna Friel; JJ Feild; Leo Gregory
- Distributed by: Buena Vista International (Goal! and Living the Dream); Metrodome Distribution (Taking on the World)
- Release dates: 30 September 2005 (Goal!); 9 February 2007 (Goal! 2: Living the Dream); 15 June 2009 (Goal! 3: Taking on the World)
- Running time: Total (3 films): 319 minutes
- Country: United Kingdom
- Language: English
- Budget: Total (3 films): $33,000,000
- Box office: Total (3 films): $32,475,778

The Goal! trilogy is a series of football films directed by Danny Cannon, Jaume Collet-Serra and Andrew Morahan. The first film, Goal!, was released in 2005, and the second film, Goal II: Living the Dream, was released in 2007. The third and final part, Goal III: Taking on the World, was released in 2009.

== Films ==
=== Goal! (2005) ===
Santiago Muñez (Kuno Becker), a skilled association football player, is the son of a gardener and lives in the Barrio section of Los Angeles, having illegally entered the United States from Mexico ten years earlier. Besides gardening with his father, he works as a busboy in a Chinese restaurant whose ultimate dream is to play football professionally. One day his skills are noticed by Glen Foy (Stephen Dillane), a former Newcastle player and scout who works as a car mechanic. Glen manages to get him a tryout with Newcastle United, which has recently signed a new player named Gavin Harris (Alessandro Nivola).

Glen warmly welcomes Santiago to his home and takes him to a tryout. Unfortunately, Santiago is unused to playing in the English style and plays poorly. Glen convinces the team manager that Santi needs a month's trial to show his full potential. Santiago does not reveal to the club nurse, Roz Harmison (Anna Friel), that he has asthma. After a month a jealous teammate crushes Santi's inhaler just before his first reserve game. An asthma flare-up prevents Santi from being able to run hard, and his coach decides to let him go. His teammate Harris discovers what happened in the reserve game and makes Santiago explain it to the manager. The manager allows Santi to stay, provided he gets treatment for his asthma. Santi manages to get a contract for the Reserves team and moves in with Gavin. Finally, he makes it onto the first team as a substitute in a match against Fulham.

Back in Los Angeles, Santi's father dies of a heart attack. Devastated, Santi plans to return home. While in the airport waiting for his flight back to Los Angeles, he decides not to return. On the final match day, Harris puts Newcastle into the lead. Before half-time, Liverpool, who are due to play in the 2005 UEFA Champions League final against AC Milan 10 days after the game, makes a comeback with two goals. In the dying minutes of injury time, Santi assists Harris in scoring the equaliser by finally passing the ball to him, to make it 2–2. Minutes before the end of the game, Santiago scores from a direct free-kick, and Newcastle win 3–2 to earn Newcastle a place in next season's UEFA Champions League, a competition Liverpool later won to qualify for the next season's competition.

=== Goal II: Living the Dream (2007) ===
The film starts at the beginning of the 2005–06 season. Barcelona defeat Real Madrid 3–0 and Gavin Harris is misfiring, having failed to score in 14 matches since signing for Real from Newcastle United for £5 million.

Back in England, Santiago is continuing to impress at Newcastle, which sparks the interest of Real Madrid, and Glen draws out a move to the Spanish giants for Santi, with Michael Owen going to Newcastle as an exchange deal. Roz soon has to head home to carry on her studies. Santi continues to impress at Real, and the manager and director of football are seen arguing over whether he should start. However, life becomes complicated for Santi when his half-brother Enrique learns of his relation to Santi and shows him a picture of his mother. Enrique learns of this and goes to tell Santi, but Santi freaks out and drives off. Santi makes his first start in a home game against Valencia CF and he is sent off after five minutes.

Things get worse for Santi as he misses the team airplane for the game against Rosenborg, and he then starts falling out with Roz as he becomes more selfish and arrogant. He sacks his agent Glen Foy, who had given him a chance in football. Santi gets injured while playing football with Gavin at home and his coach bans him from returning home for Christmas. Roz begins to think that Santiago is cheating on her.

For New Year's Eve, Gavin organizes a party to which Jordana García is invited. Jordana and Santi share a kiss, and the next scene shows Santiago telling Gavin that nothing happened between him and Jordana. Little did Santi know that a snoopy cameraman snapped a pic of them, and he published it in a tabloid. Roz is shocked and refuses to call back Santi. Enrique and Santi encounter each other again, and Santiago gives Enrique a ride home.

Frustrated that his mother will not allow him to be a part of Santi's life, Enrique follows Santi to a bar and steals his Lamborghini. Santi jumps in a taxi and orders the cab to pursue the car. Enrique crashes the car and Santi is interviewed by the police at the hospital where Enrique has been treated. Santi lies to the police in order to protect Enrique. At the same time, the same snoopy cameraman follows Santi and Enrique to the crash site and the hospital. He takes a picture of Santi with the police, and Santi freaks out on the cameraman, assaulting him and breaking his camera. Santi is arrested, so he calls Glen for help, but after recently firing him, Glen is in no mood to help him. Santi gets out of jail, and he finally decides that enough is enough with his mommy problems. Santi finally finds his mother and they talk over what happened where his mom reveals she ran away because a man and Santi's uncle attacked her.

Having qualified for the Champions League final in their home stadium, Santi phones Roz and apologizes for his behaviour. It is revealed that Roz is pregnant with their child. Real Madrid play Arsenal in the final and are trailing 1–0 at half time. Santi is brought on to play behind Gavin. Arsenal score again through Thierry Henry. Real concede a second penalty. However, Arsenal miss the penalty and Gavin pulls one back. Santi hits the bar before scoring during injury time. With seconds to go, Santi wins a free kick. Beckham scores the free kick to win the Champions League.

=== Goal III: Taking on the World (2009) ===
In the third installment of the football drama trilogy Goal!, Kuno Becker returns as Santiago Munez, who, along with his best friends and England national team players Charlie Braithwaite (Leo Gregory) and Liam Adams (JJ Feild), are selected for their respective national teams at the 2006 FIFA World Cup Finals in Germany. This time round, Santi is not the main character of the film (he has very little screen time) with that role going to Liam Adams and Charlie Braithwaite.

However, as the three attend the shooting of a film Charlie is featured in, tragedy befalls them. All three players, as well as Charlie's new love interest and soon to be fiancée Sophia Tardelli (played by Kasia Smutniak) suffer a car accident which puts Santi out of contention through injuries. Meanwhile, Liam Adams discovers to his horror that he has a new daughter, Bella, from former love interest June (played by Anya Lahiri). This only adds to Liam's pre-existing alcoholism and release from Real Madrid. It is revealed that Santi is set to return to England as a Tottenham Hotspur player under a two-year contract, along with Adams, who re-signs from Newcastle United, the original club of both ex-Real players. The film goes on to depict the World Cup from the English perspective. Liam scores against Sweden (2–2), assisted by a header from Charlie, and England qualify for the knock-out stages. In the match against Ecuador, Charlie is injured and later collapses in the changing room. He is rushed to hospital and dies on the way from an aneurysm (from the car accident). Italy beat France on penalties in the final to win the World Cup.

England crash out of the quarter-finals against Portugal as Adams misses a crucial penalty against Portuguese keeper Ricardo while Cristiano Ronaldo converts. Despite the loss, the movie ends on a high note.

== Cast ==
| Character | Film | | |
| Character | Goal! | Goal! 2: Living the Dream | Goal! 3: Taking on the World |
|---|---|---|---|
| Santiago Munez | Kuno Becker | Kuno Becker | Kuno Becker |
| Gavin Harris | Alessandro Nivola | Alessandro Nivola | |
| Glen Foy | Stephen Dillane | Stephen Dillane | |
| Roz Harmison | Anna Friel | Anna Friel | |
| Erik Dornhelm | Marcel Iures | | |
| Barry Rankin | Sean Pertwee | Sean Pertwee | |
| Mercedes Munez | Míriam Colón | Míriam Colón | Míriam Colón |
| Hernan Munez | Tony Plana | | |
| Rudi van der Merwe | | Rutger Hauer | |
| Carol Harmison | Frances Barber | Frances Barber | |
| Rosa Maria | | Elizabeth Peña | |
| Jordana Garcia | | Leonor Varela | |
| Enrique | | Jorge Jurado | |
| Charlie Braithwaite | | | Leo Gregory |
| Liam Adams | | | JJ Feild |
| Nick Ashworth | | | Nick Moran |
| Ronnie | | | Tamer Hassan |
| Sophia Tardelli | | | Kasia Smutniak |
| June | | | Anya Lahiri |
| Foghorn | Christopher Fairbank | Christopher Fairbank | Christopher Fairbank |
| Gordon | Mike Elliott | Mike Elliott | Mike Elliott |
| Phil | Craig Heaney | Craig Heaney | Craig Heaney |
| David Beckham | Himself | Himself | Himself |

== Box office performance ==
| Film | Release date | Box office revenue | | | Reference |
| Film | Release date | Domestic (U.S. & Canada) | International | Worldwide | Reference |
|---|---|---|---|---|---|
| Goal! | September 30, 2005 | $4,283,255 | $23,327,618 | $27,610,873 | |
| Goal! 2: Living the Dream | February 9, 2007 | $225,067 | $7,639,838 | $7,864,905 | |
| Goal! 3: Taking on the World (Note: Goal! 3 was not released to the box office but directly onto DVD and Blu-ray.) | June 15, 2009 | N/A | N/A | N/A | |
| Goal! trilogy | | $4,508,322 | $30,967,456 | $35,475,778 | |

== Critical reaction ==
| Film | Rotten Tomatoes | Metacritic | Yahoo! Movies |
|---|---|---|---|
| Goal! | 44% (80 reviews) | 53% (19 reviews) | C+ (11 reviews) |
| Goal! 2: Living the Dream | 39% (18 reviews) | – (3 reviews) | – (0 reviews) |
| Goal! 3: Taking on the World | – (0 reviews) | – (0 reviews) | – (0 reviews) |
