= Adrian Butchart =

English screenwriter

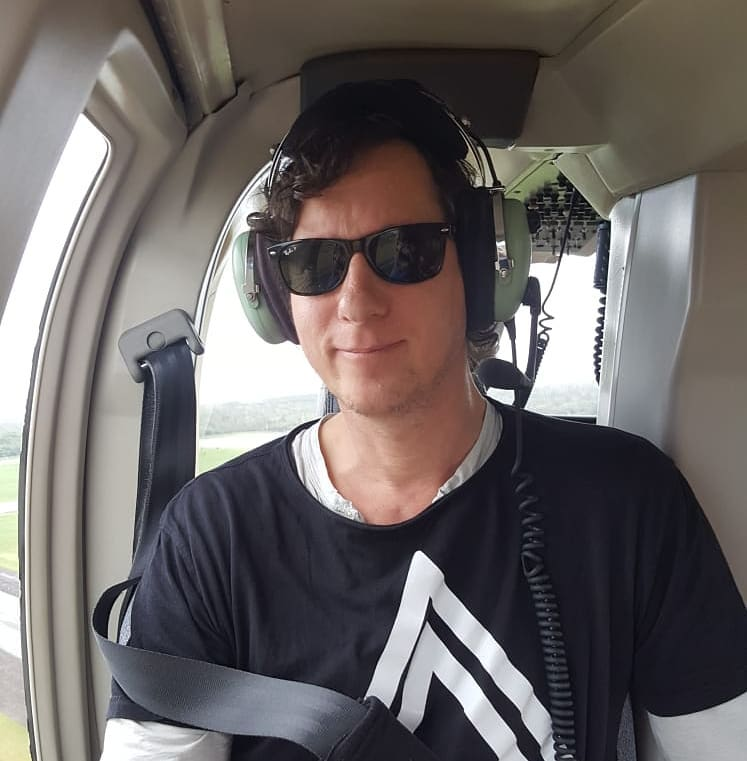
- Butchart on location scout 2018
- Born: United Kingdom
- Other name: Adrian Dylan Butchart
- Education: University of Reading
- Occupations: Screenwriter; film producer
- Years active: 2000–present
- Organization: BAFTA

Adrian Butchart is a British screenwriter and film producer best known for being one of the writers of the movies Goal! and Goal! 2: Living the Dream....

== Early life ==
Butchart was born in England of Scottish parents and grew up in London before moving to Edinburgh at age 9 where he went to The Edinburgh Academy. He returned to London and attended first Mander Portman Woodward in South Kensington and then the University of Reading graduating with a 2.1 BSc (Hons) in Estate Management. He is an active member of BAFTA and keen supporter of Chelsea Football Club.

== Career ==
At University to study real estate, he developed a passion for film but not wishing to change courses, offered to act as producer for a friend on the film course, Hugo Currie's student film. The short, Headstrong starring Danny Cunningham, cost only £300 to make and mostly involved improvising - borrowing locations and using an old shopping cart for a dolly. Currie's next short The Cookie Thief starring Jack Davenport, Honor Fraser and Oliver Milburn was nominated for the Palme D'Or at the Cannes Film Festival and Currie invited Butchart to represent the film as his producer.

After leaving University, Butchart continued to work in real estate while teaching himself to write in the evenings. In early 2000 one of his screenplays found its way to the desk of a Producer in Hollywood who urged him to move to Los Angeles and later that year he was signed by the ICM Partners agency and then by Propaganda Films whose other clients included Spike Jonze, Antoine Fuqua and Steven Soderbergh. Butchart wrote several commercials and music videos and became the go-to writer for Radio City Music Hall in New York.

In 2003 Butchart had his first film made I Love Your Work which he co-wrote with actor and director Adam Goldberg. The film's cast included Giovanni Ribisi, Christina Ricci, Joshua Jackson, Jason Lee, Vince Vaughn and Elvis Costello and premiered at the Toronto International Film Festival to mixed reviews, mainly focusing on Goldberg's directing.

Butchart next co-wrote the film Goal! with Producer Mike Jefferies and contributions from veteran British writers Dick Clement and Ian La Frenais. It is the story of a young illegal immigrant Santiago Munez, rising from poverty to become one of the World's greatest players. It was released by Disney and shown in 38 countries worldwide. The film scored moderately at the box office, making $27.6 million in theaters but by the time it reached DVD, huge sales made it the gold standard for sports films in the UK, many European territories and South America. It is still shown regularly on the BBC whenever there is a major tournament. It was nominated for 7 Awards and won lead actor Kuno Becker the Best Actor Award at the Imagen Awards 2007. In 2018 Sport Bible voted Goal! the Greatest Football Film of All Time.

Butchart also co-wrote of the sequel, Goal! 2: Living the Dream... directed by Jaume Collet-Serra, the second part of Santiago's story in which he plays for the glamorous Galacticos of Real Madrid. The movie became another global hit, released by Buena Vista (Walt Disney Company) and featured a host of stars including David Beckham.

In 2008 he produced the horror/thriller From Within directed by cinematographer Phedon Papamichael Jr. and starring Elizabeth Rice, Thomas Dekker, Brittany Robertson and Rumer Willis. It Premiered at the Tribeca Film Festival in 2009 with a screening attended by Bruce Willis and Demi Moore and also showed at the Fantasia International Film Festival in Montreal and London's Frightfest. It won the Best Film award at the 2008 Solstice Film Festival and was released in the US by Lionsgate and internationally by EOne.

He continued to work as a writer, selling a TV series to Showtime and was named as an executive producer on the 2012 dramedy Lost Angeles although is not thought to have taken an active role in the movie.

In November 2015 after footballer Jamie Vardy broke the record for scoring in the most consecutive games in the Premier League the British press started reporting that Butchart was interested in turning his story into a feature film. Butchart secured the player's rights and the backing of his club Leicester City and was in the process of researching the film when the small club won the English Premier League against odds of 5,000-1 immediately making it an event of global significance. The film gathered huge momentum and Butchart was joined by Oscar winning King's Speech producers Gareth Unwin and Simon Egan and The Fighter writers Paul Tamasy and Eric Johnson. The film is slated to start filming in spring 2020.

== Filmography ==
Year	Film	-
2023	Yahoo Boys	Producer
2023	Fearless (Jamie Vardy/Leicester City movie)	Producer Writer
2012	Lost Angeles	Executive Producer
2008	From Within	Producer
2008	The Crimson Wing: Mystery of the Flamingos	Special Thanks
2007	Goal! 2: Living the Dream...	Co-Writer
2005	Goal!	Co-Writer
2003	Running With The Bulls	Self
2003	I Love Your Work	Writer

== Awards and nominations ==
- Nominee Choice Drama for Goal! Teen Choice Awards 2006
- Nominee Best Picture for Goal! Imagen Awards 2007
- Winner Best Film for From Within Solstice Film Festival 2008
- Winner Special Commendation Award for From Within Festival of Fantastic Films, UK
- Winner Best Film for From Within Gérardmer Film Festival 2010
