= Craig Heaney =

British screen, stage and radio actor (born 1973)

Craig Heaney (born August 1973) is a British screen, stage and radio actor. He may be best known as Private Roy W. Cobb in the award-winning ten-part mini-series Band of Brothers (2001). He played Phil in Danny Cannon's 2005 football movie Goal! and its 2009 sequel, Goal III: Taking on the World. He also appeared in the 2008 Christopher Nolan film The Dark Knight as a ferry passenger.

Heaney's other television roles include the sweet-hearted Billy Breeze in Breeze Block, Larry Boyd in P.O.W and Mick in Distant Shores. He has also had appearances in such British television mainstays as Casualty, Peak Practice and Heartbeat. His radio work includes Two Planks and a Passion, written and co-directed by Anthony Minghella for BBC Radio 4.

He trained at the Academy Drama School, where he was the recipient of the Stage Scholarship.

== Partial filmography ==
- Out of Depth (2000) - Armed police officer
- Band of Brothers (2001) - Roy W. Cobb
- Goal! (2005) - Phil
- Goal II: Living the Dream (2007) - Phil
- The Dark Knight (2008) - Passenger
- Goal III: Taking on the World (2009) - Phil
