= Jamie Vardy =

English footballer (born 1987)

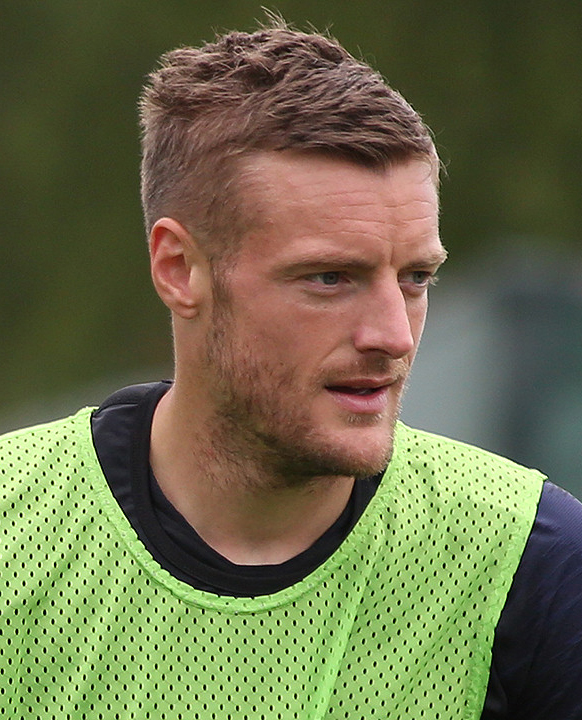
- Vardy in 2018

Personal information
- Full name: Jamie Richard Vardy
- Birth name: Jamie Richard Gill
- Date of birth: 11 January 1987 (age 39)
- Place of birth: Sheffield, England
- Height: 5 ft 10 in (1.79 m)
- Position: Striker

Team information
- Current team: Burnley
- Number: 9

Youth career
- 1996–2002: Sheffield Wednesday
- 2003–2006: Stocksbridge Park Steels

Senior career*
| Years | Team | Apps | (Gls) |
| 2006–2010 | Stocksbridge Park Steels | 88 | (40) |
| 2010–2011 | FC Halifax Town | 37 | (26) |
| 2011–2012 | Fleetwood Town | 36 | (31) |
| 2012–2025 | Leicester City | 440 | (183) |
| 2025–2026 | Cremonese | 29 | (7) |
| 2026– | Burnley | 7 | (1) |

International career
| 2015–2018 | England | 26 | (7) |
- * Club domestic league appearances and goals as of 11:04, 4 November 2026 (UTC)

Jamie Richard Vardy (né Gill; born 11 January 1987) is an English professional footballer who plays as a striker for EFL Championship club Burnley.

After being released by Sheffield Wednesday at age 16, Vardy began his senior career with Stocksbridge Park Steels. He broke into the first team in 2007 and spent three seasons there before joining Northern Premier League Premier Division club FC Halifax Town in 2010. Scoring 25 goals in his debut season, he won the club's Players' Player of the Year award and then moved to Conference Premier club Fleetwood Town in August 2011 for an undisclosed fee. He scored 31 league goals in his first season at his new team, winning the team's Player of the Year award as they won the division.

Vardy signed for Leicester City in the Championship in May 2012 for a non-League record transfer fee of £1 million and helped the team win the Championship in 2014. In the 2015–16 Premier League season, he scored in 11 consecutive Premier League matches, breaking Ruud van Nistelrooy's record, and was voted the Premier League Player of the Season and FWA Footballer of the Year as underdogs Leicester won the title. He won the Premier League Golden Boot for the 2019–20 season, becoming the oldest player to win the award. In 2021, he won the FA Cup and FA Community Shield. After relegation in 2023, he was named captain and led the club to promotion the following year by winning the EFL Championship in 2024, before departing in 2025 following another relegation. He played his final match with Leicester City exactly 13 years after first signing with them in May 2025, scoring a total of 200 goals in 500 appearances for the club. He then played for Serie A side Cremonese for a single season. He signed for Burnley in 2026.

Vardy made his international debut for the England national team in June 2015 and was selected for UEFA Euro 2016 and the 2018 FIFA World Cup, retiring following the latter tournament.

== Early life ==
Vardy was born in Sheffield, South Yorkshire, to Richard Gill and Lisa Clewes. His biological father walked out on the family when Vardy was still an infant. His mother later married Phil Vardy, and he took his stepfather's surname. Vardy grew up in the Hillsborough area of inner-city Sheffield. His stepfather was a crane worker and his mother worked at a solicitors' office. Growing up, he was a fan of Sheffield Wednesday where he idolised striker David Hirst. In the 1990s and 2000s, Vardy witnessed the intense rivalry in the city of Sheffield between fans of Sheffield Wednesday and Sheffield United that culminated in memorable Steel City derbies. On the rivalry, he notes: "It was always good when they were playing against each other. The atmospheres that you get were really good and people live for football. So games like this for Sheffield are massive and obviously bragging rights and everything that go with it." Being a lifelong Sheffield Wednesday fan, the rivalry led to Vardy performing some memorable celebrations against Sheffield United fans including Leicester City's 2–1 win against United where Vardy scored and celebrated in front of the home fans at Bramall Lane.

== Club career ==
=== Early career ===
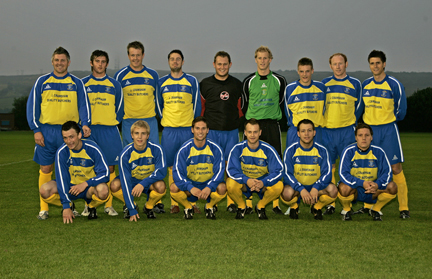
Vardy with Stocksbridge Park Steels in 2007 (back row, third from right)

Vardy was in the youth system at Sheffield Wednesday, but was released when he was 16. He then played at Stocksbridge Park Steels, earning £120 a week. After making his way through the reserve team, he made his first team league debut under manager Peter Rinkcavage in 2006. His real break out came under manager Gary Marrow during the 2007–08 season. After impressive displays, a number of Football League teams became interested and in 2009 he spent a week on trial with Crewe Alexandra. A move did not materialise and he later turned down a short-term contract with Rotherham United.

Vardy scored a total of 55 goals for the club in all competitions. He helped the team win the Sheffield & Hallamshire Senior Cup and promotion to the Northern Premier League in 2008–09.

In June 2010, manager Neil Aspin, a longtime admirer of Vardy's talents, signed him for FC Halifax Town for a fee of £15,000. He made his debut on 21 August 2010 in the home match against Buxton, scoring the winning goal in a match that ended 2–1 to his new club. Vardy had a successful first season with "the Shaymen" finishing as the club's top goalscorer with 25 goals from 37 appearances and being voted the Player's Player of the Season. Towards the end of the season he came close to scoring a hat-trick of hat-tricks but failed to find a third goal in Halifax's 3–1 win over Nantwich Town. His goals helped secure the Northern Premier League Premier Division title for the 2010–11 season. Vardy started the 2011–12 season with Halifax and scored three goals in the opening four matches of the season.

=== Fleetwood Town ===
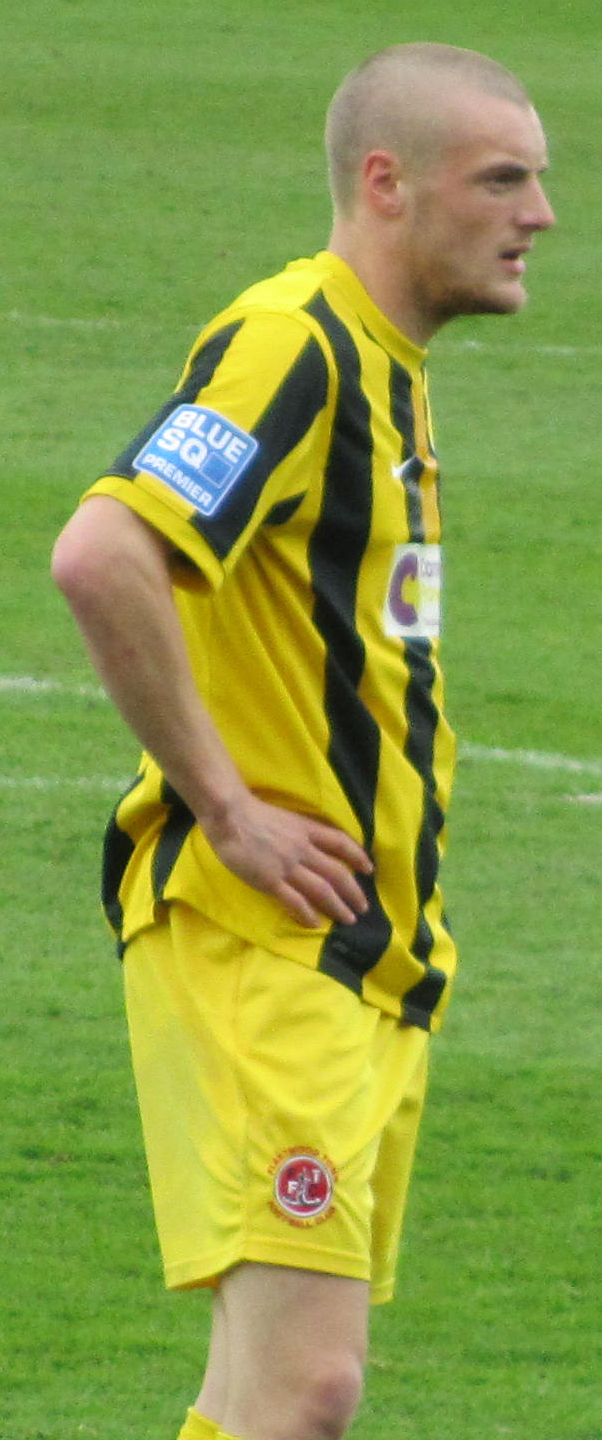
Vardy playing for Fleetwood Town in 2012

After just over a year with Halifax, Vardy signed for Conference Premier club Fleetwood Town for an undisclosed fee. He made his debut the same day in a 0–0 home draw with York City. He scored his first goals for the club in his third appearance, scoring twice in a 3–2 win away to Kettering Town on 3 September. The following week he scored another two goals against Gateshead at Highbury Stadium, including one in added time. He scored twice for a third consecutive match in the 3–1 away win against Ebbsfleet United, but did not score again for just over a month until he scored a hat-trick in the away match against Alfreton Town on 18 October. On 20 September, he was given a straight red card in a 5–2 home win over Kidderminster Harriers, a match in which each team played for over an hour with ten men. Four days after his hat-trick, Vardy scored two more goals in a 4–1 win over Bath City, a result which left Fleetwood two points behind leaders Wrexham.

In the first round of the FA Cup on 12 November, Vardy scored the second goal in a 2–0 win over League One team Wycombe Wanderers. Fifteen days later, his goal in a 1–1 draw at Gateshead meant that he had recorded a goal in each of his last six appearances, totalling ten goals in that period; he won the Conference Premier Player of the Month award for November. On 13 December, Vardy confirmed a 2–0 win in added time as Fleetwood triumphed away to Yeovil Town in the Cup second round replay.

On 1 January 2012, Vardy scored twice in a 6–0 win over Southport, and six days later the team lost 5–1 at home to local rivals Blackpool in the third round of the Cup. After the match, Blackpool manager Ian Holloway made a £750,000 offer for him, which Fleetwood rejected, holding on for £1 million and a loan back to the club. He totalled six goals in his first four matches of the calendar year. On 21 February, he recorded a second hat-trick of the campaign, in a 6–2 win over Ebbsfleet United which left Fleetwood two points ahead of Wrexham at the top of the table. Vardy scored both Fleetwood goals in a 2–2 draw against Lincoln City on 13 April; Wrexham's draw against Grimsby Town the next day gave Fleetwood the Conference title and a first-ever promotion to the Football League. Vardy's 31 league goals saw him finish the season as the top scorer in the Conference Premier.

=== Leicester City ===
==== 2012–15: Promotion to the Premier League ====
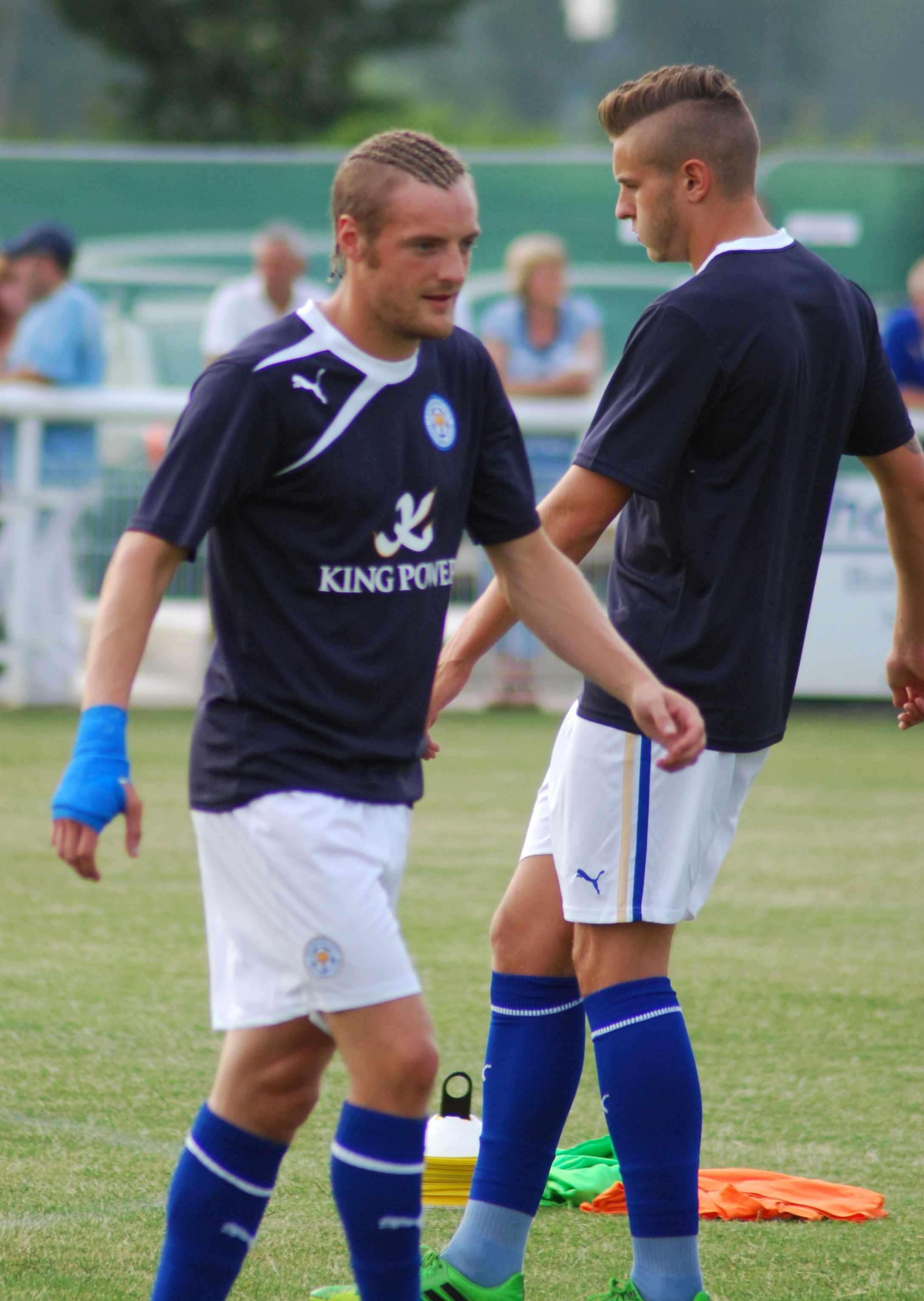
Vardy (left) warming up for Leicester City in 2013

On 18 May 2012, it was announced that Vardy would be signing for Championship club Leicester City ahead of the 2012–13 season, for a reported fee of £1 million, a non-League record, which could potentially be worth up to £1.7 million with add-ons. The next day, he signed on a three-year contract until June 2015. On 14 August, Vardy made his debut for Leicester against Torquay United in the first round of the League Cup, playing the entirety of the match at Plainmoor and heading the final goal in a 4–0 win. Four days later he made his Football League debut at the King Power Stadium, a 2–0 win over Peterborough United in which he set up a goal for Andy King. He scored his first league goal in a 2–1 away defeat to Blackburn Rovers on 25 August. In September, he scored the winner in two 2–1 comeback victories, against Burnley and Middlesbrough. Vardy's first season at the club was marred by his own loss of form, prompting criticism from some City supporters on social media, and he even considered leaving football until manager Nigel Pearson and assistant manager Craig Shakespeare convinced him to continue with the club.

The following season brought a turn around in Vardy's fortunes as he established himself as a prolific scorer in the Leicester attack as the club took a commanding lead at the top of the table. Vardy scored and won a penalty kick in the local derby as Leicester beat high flying Derby County 4–1 on 10 January 2014 and reaffirmed their position at the top of the Championship. Vardy finished the season with 16 league goals as Leicester were promoted to the Premier League at the end of the season as champions, and was named Leicester's Players' Player of the season at the club's awards.

On 19 August 2014, Vardy extended his contract until the summer of 2018. After missing the first two matches of the season through injury, he made his Premier League debut on 31 August 2014, as a second-half substitute in a 1–1 draw at home to Arsenal. On 21 September, Vardy delivered a man of the match performance by scoring his first Premier League goal and setting up the other four as Leicester made a surprise comeback from 3–1 down to a 5–3 victory against Manchester United. On 11 April 2015, Vardy scored a 90th-minute winning goal in Leicester's 3–2 victory away to West Bromwich Albion. Impressive form throughout the rest of April, including another winning goal, against Burnley on 25 April, saw Vardy nominated for the Premier League Player of the Month award. Vardy and Leicester ended the 2014–15 season in a safe 14th position having picked up 22 points since 4 April, capping things off by opening the scoring in a 5–1 victory against Queens Park Rangers on the final day of the Premier League season on 24 May.

==== 2015–16: Premier League title ====
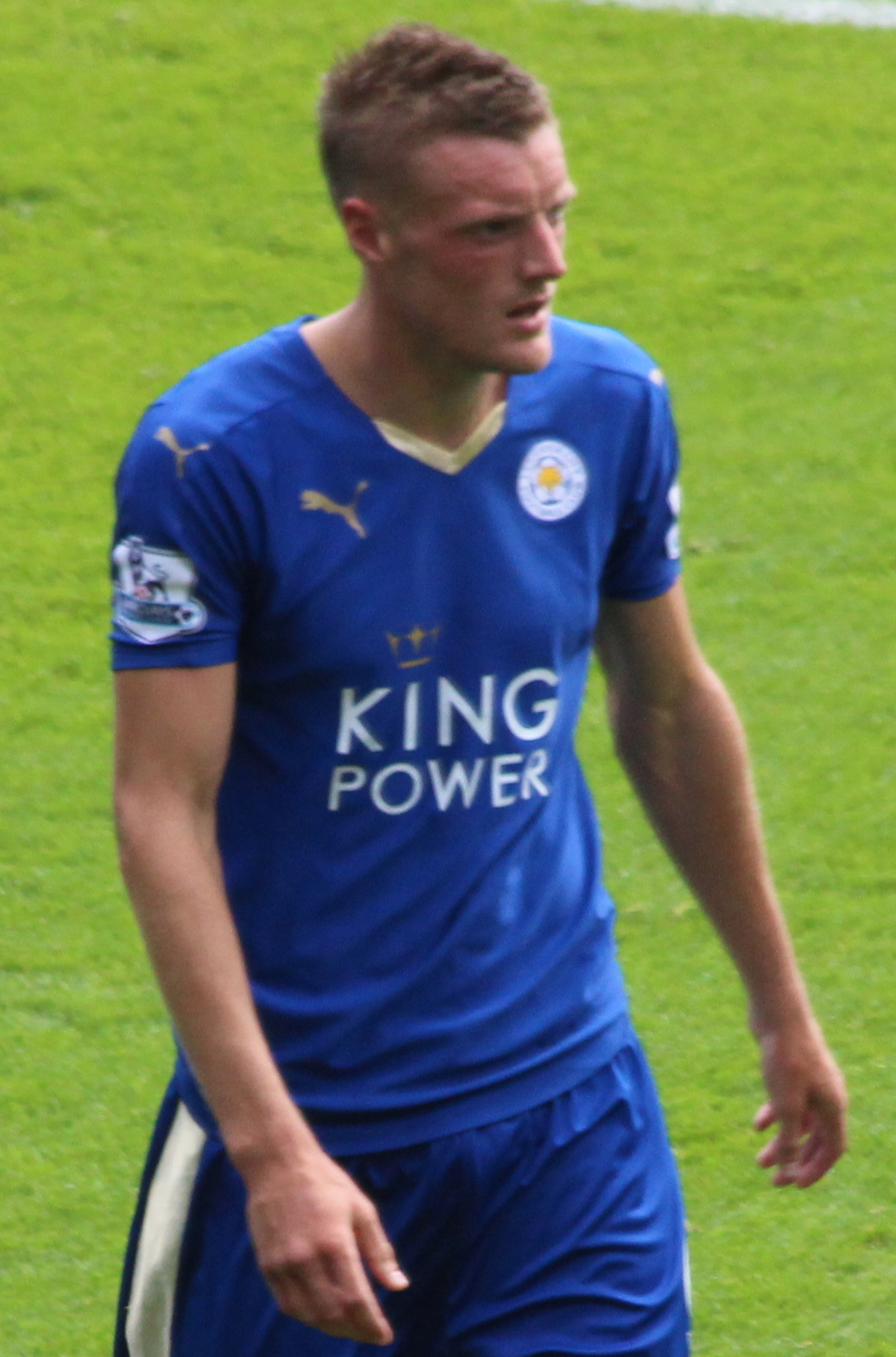
Vardy playing for Leicester City in 2015

Vardy started the 2015–16 season by scoring the opening goal as Leicester picked up a 4–2 victory at home against Sunderland on 8 August 2015. He scored the equaliser in Leicester's 3–2 comeback victory against Aston Villa on 13 September. With two goals in Leicester's 5–2 defeat by Arsenal on 26 September, Vardy reached seven league goals for the season, eclipsing his goal tally of the previous year.

On 24 October, he scored the only goal of a home win over Crystal Palace, the seventh consecutive Premier League match in which he scored, and his tenth goal of the league season. Vardy scored in his eighth league match in a row on 31 October, and became only the third player ever to do so in the Premier League after Ruud van Nistelrooy (twice) and Daniel Sturridge, in a 3–2 win over West Bromwich Albion. A week later, he won and scored a penalty to secure a 2–1 win over Watford, putting him on nine consecutive matches with a goal, behind Van Nistelrooy's Premier League record of ten. Vardy also became the first player in the Premier League to score in nine consecutive matches in a single season, as Van Nistelrooy's 10 matches were at the end of the 2002–03 season and the beginning of the 2003–04 season. For his run of good form, Vardy was the Premier League Player of the Month for October 2015, the first Leicester player to be given the accolade since goalkeeper Tim Flowers in 2000.

On 21 November, Vardy matched Van Nistelrooy's record of consecutive Premier League matches with a goal, opening a 3–0 win over Newcastle United. A week later, against Manchester United, he scored again to claim the record for himself. His run ended on 5 December when he did not score in a 3–0 win at Swansea City. Had he done so, he would have equalled the English top-flight record of 12 consecutive scoring matches set by Jimmy Dunne for Sheffield United in the 1931–32 season; the result nonetheless put Leicester top of the table. Following his goalscoring exploits, Vardy was again named as the Premier League Player of the Month for November, becoming only the fifth ever player to win the award in consecutive months. He was presented with a certificate from Guinness World Records for his achievement.

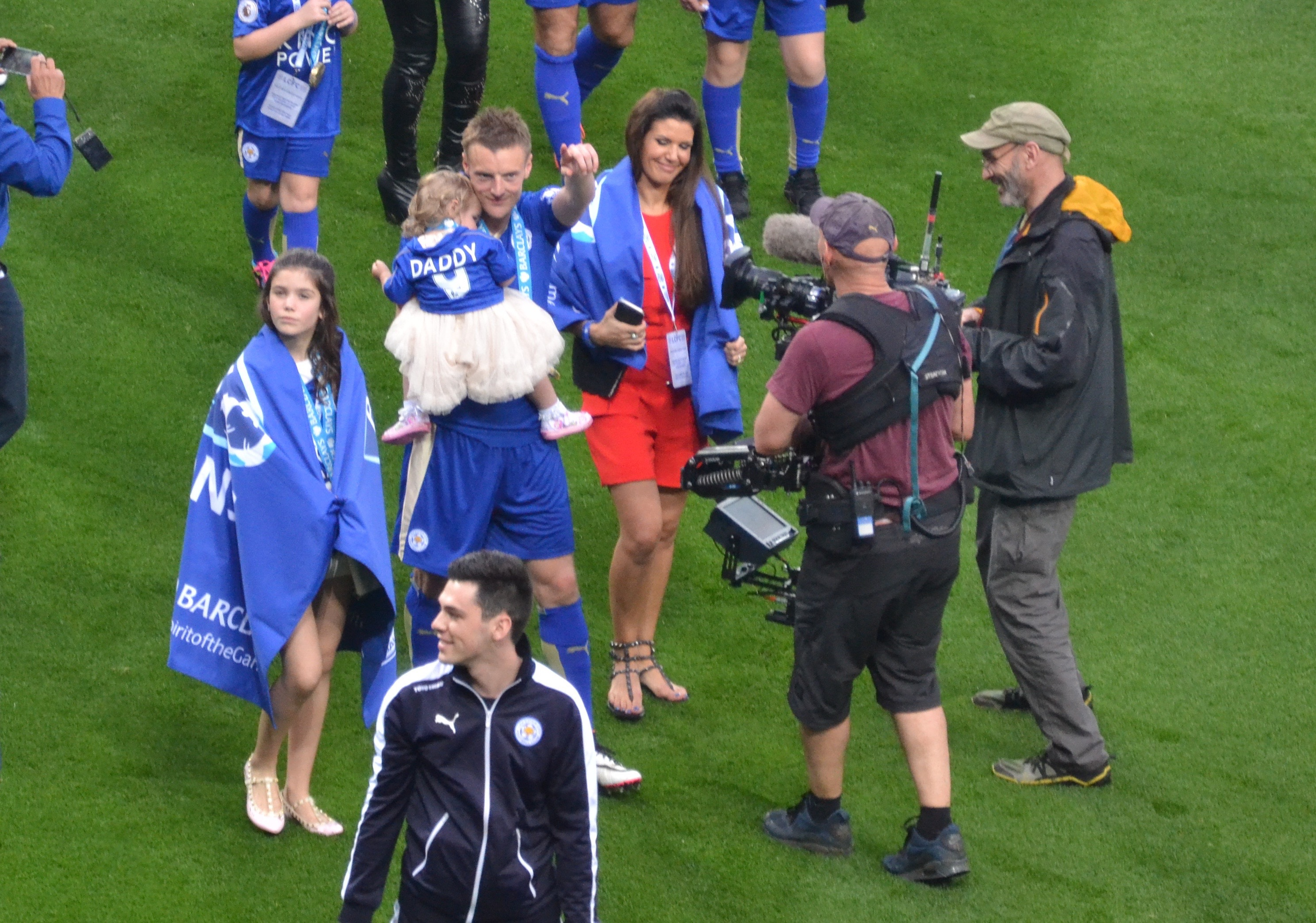
Vardy celebrating Leicester City's Premier League title victory with his family in 2016

In January 2016, manager Claudio Ranieri declared that Vardy and Riyad Mahrez would be sold to no-one, describing them as "priceless". On 2 February, he scored both goals in a 2–0 win against Liverpool, the first being a long-distance volley described as "world class" by opposing manager Jürgen Klopp. Four days later, he signed a new contract to keep himself at Leicester until 2019, increasing his weekly salary to £80,000. On 10 April 2016, Vardy scored both goals (his 20th and 21st of the season) in Leicester's 2–0 win at Sunderland, becoming the first Leicester player since Gary Lineker in the 1984–85 season to score 20 goals in the top division of English football. The result also secured qualification to the UEFA Champions League for the first time in Leicester's history. A week later, Vardy scored the first goal of a 2–2 home draw against West Ham United, but was later sent off for diving in the penalty area under pressure from Angelo Ogbonna. He was charged with improper conduct for his reaction to the dismissal and was fined £10,000, as well as being suspended for two matches during a vital point of Leicester's eventually successful title campaign.

With 24 league goals, Vardy was the second-highest scorer in the Premier League for the 2015–16 season, alongside Sergio Agüero, only one goal behind Golden Boot winner Harry Kane. Vardy was one of four Leicester players in the PFA Team of the Year; he was later also named the FWA Footballer of the Year, and the 2016 Barclays Premier League Player of the Season.

==== 2016–19: Drop in form and venture in Europe ====
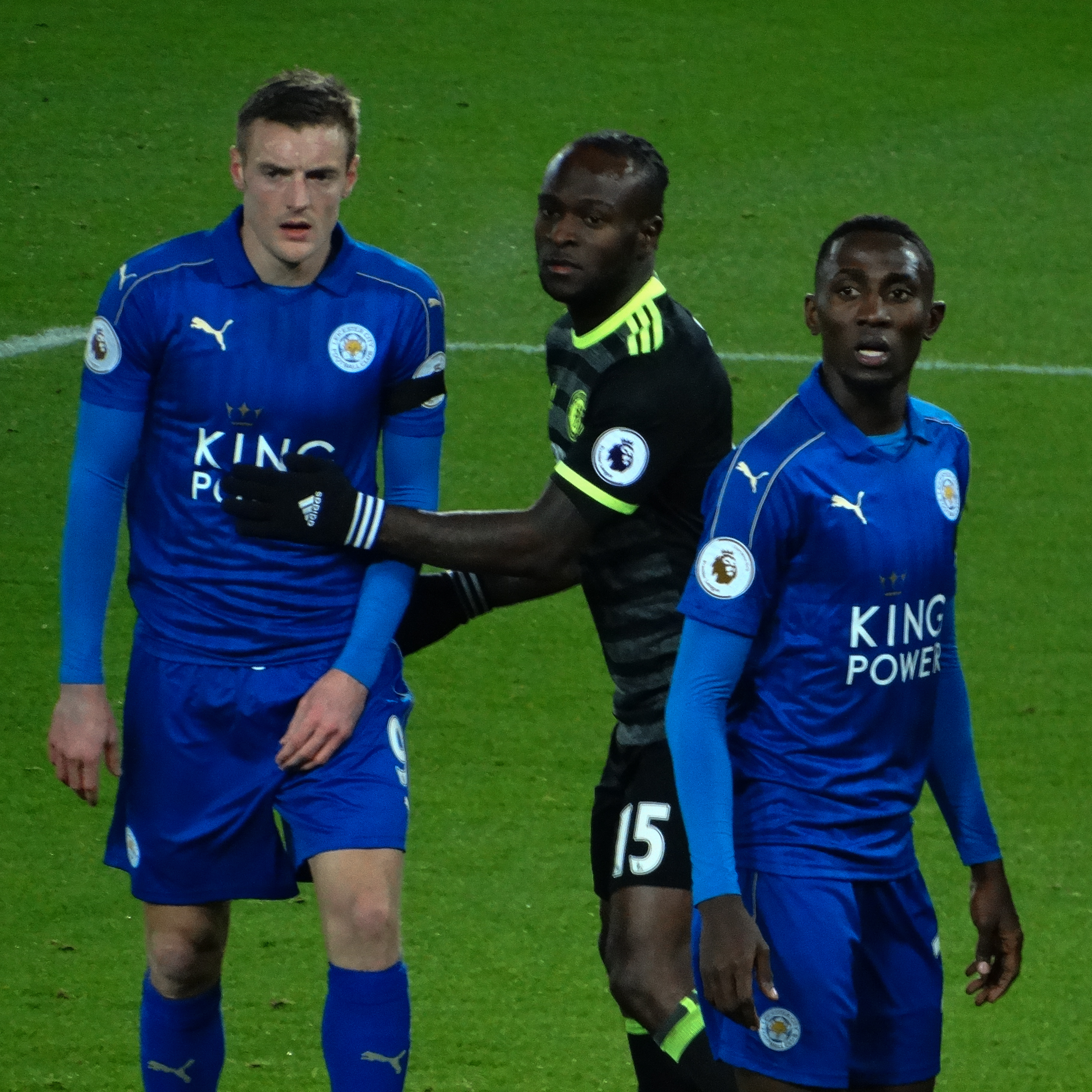
Vardy (left) playing for Leicester City in 2017

On 3 June 2016, Arsenal made a bid of £22 million for Vardy, triggering a release clause in his contract. Leicester offered him improved terms, and 20 days later he agreed to a new four-year contract, to be signed on his return from UEFA Euro 2016. Vardy rejected Arsenal's offer, because Arsenal had not promised that he would be played in his normal position and because of the differences between the two clubs' tactics, with Arsène Wenger favouring possession and Leicester playing on the counter-attack.

On 7 August 2016, he scored in a 2–1 defeat to Manchester United in the 2016 FA Community Shield. Twenty days later, Vardy scored his first league goal of the season in Leicester's first win of the campaign, beating Swansea City 2–1. On 10 December, Vardy ended his ten-match drought within the opening five minutes against Manchester City. He ended up scoring another two for his first professional hat-trick to help Leicester to a 4–2 victory, their first win in five league matches. A week later, he was sent off in the first half of a 2–2 draw at Stoke City for a challenge on Mame Biram Diouf; Leicester appealed unsuccessfully against his three-match suspension.

Vardy scored his first Champions League goal on 22 February 2017 in a 2–1 away defeat to Sevilla in the first leg of the round of 16. On 18 April, he scored Leicester's equaliser in their second leg quarter-final match against Atlético Madrid, but nonetheless Leicester were eliminated 2–1 on aggregate.

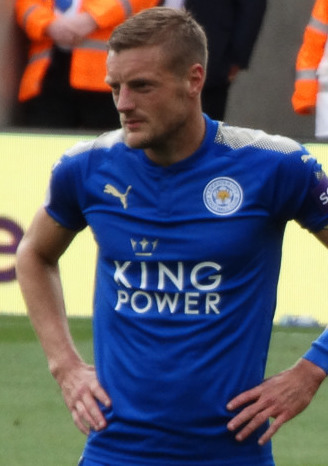
Vardy playing for Leicester City in 2017

Vardy began his sixth season at the club by netting two goals in the 4–3 away loss to Arsenal in the opening day of the 2017–18 season. On 16 October, Vardy made his 200th appearance for the club in the 1–1 draw against West Bromwich Albion. Two weeks later, he scored the opener of a 2–0 home win against Everton in Claude Puel's debut match as Leicester manager. On 23 December 2017, Vardy scored his 50th Premier League goal in a 2–2 draw against Manchester United.

By scoring twice in the final match of the season, a 5–4 away defeat by Tottenham Hotspur, Vardy reached 20-goal landmark in the Premier League for the second time in his career. Overall, he made 42 appearances in all competitions, scoring 23 times as Leicester finished the Premier League in 9th place. Vardy was the recipient of the BBC Goal of the Season award for a goal against West Bromwich Albion where he struck a first-time ball with his weaker foot that was looped over his shoulder at range by his strike partner Riyad Mahrez.

On 9 August 2018, just before the start of the 2018–19 season, Vardy signed a new four-year contract at Leicester, keeping him at the club until June 2022. Vardy started the season as a substitute, scoring a 92nd minute consolation goal in the 2–1 away defeat to Manchester United in the opening match of the season. He was sent off in the following match after a harsh tackle on Wolverhampton Wanderers defender Matt Doherty. On 9 March 2019, Vardy scored his 100th goal for Leicester, scoring two goals in a 3–1 home win over Fulham. On 28 April 2019, Vardy scored another two goals, this time in a 3–0 home victory against Arsenal, bringing his goal tally in league football for Leicester to 100.

==== 2019–22: Premier League Golden Boot and FA Cup win ====
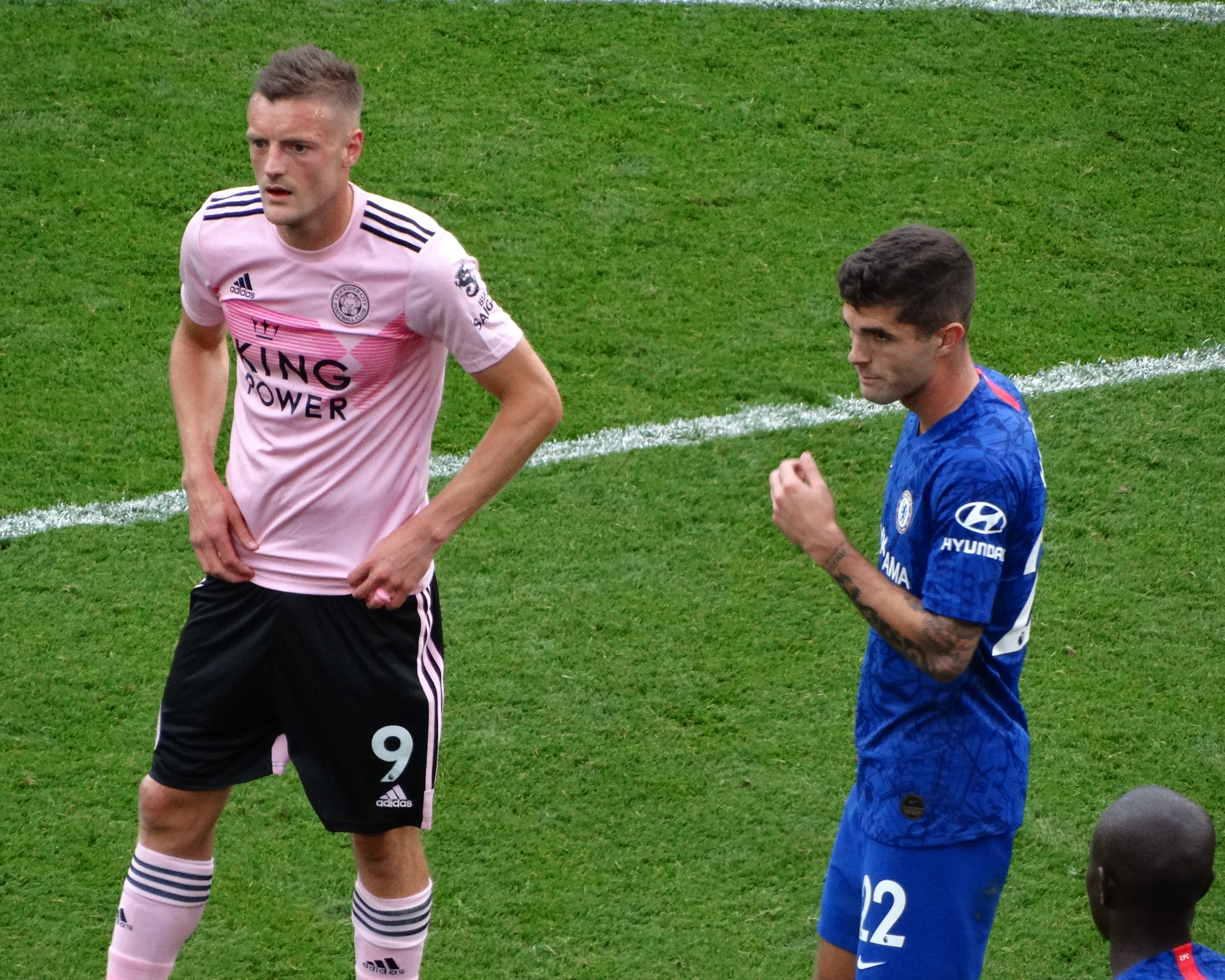
Vardy (left) playing for Leicester City in 2019

On 25 October 2019, Vardy scored a hat-trick in a 9–0 away win against Southampton. Vardy scored his 100th and 101st goal in the Premier League on 4 July 2020 in a 3–0 victory over Crystal Palace. He became the first Leicester player to reach the 100 goal milestone, and the 29th overall in Premier League history. Of those 29 players, only Ian Wright (28 years 286 days) made his debut in the competition at a greater age than Vardy (27 years 232 days).

With 23 goals, he won the Premier League Golden Boot for the first time in his career, followed by Southampton forward Danny Ings and Arsenal forward Pierre-Emerick Aubameyang both on 22 goals. The 33-year-old Vardy became the oldest player to win the award; Didier Drogba was the previous oldest when, aged 32, he led Chelsea to the 2009–10 Premier League title with 29 goals.

On 26 August 2020, Vardy signed a new contract with Leicester City until June 2023. On 27 September, he scored his second hat-trick against Manchester City in a 5–2 away win. On 25 October, he scored the only goal in a 1–0 win against Arsenal, to gain Leicester City their first away win against Arsenal since September 1973. On 6 December, while celebrating his last-minute goal in Leicester's 2–1 win against Sheffield United, Vardy slid into and destroyed a corner flag which was carrying the rainbow flag colours as part of Stonewall's Rainbow Laces campaign. Vardy later signed the flag and gave it to Foxes Pride, Leicester's LGBT+ supporters group. On 15 May 2021, he started in the 2021 FA Cup final as Leicester defeated Chelsea 1–0, the first time the club had ever won the Cup. By playing in the final, Vardy became the first player to play in every round of the competition, including the preliminary stages. Before the 2021–22 season, Leicester would win the 2021 FA Community Shield over defending Premier League champions Manchester City.

==== 2022–25: Later years and relegation ====
In the midst of Leicester City's battle to steer clear of relegation in the 2022–23 season, he emphasized that eluding relegation would stand as the pinnacle accomplishment of his career. Nevertheless, Leicester City faced relegation after ending up in the 18th position on the league table. Following captain Jonny Evans' departure, Leicester manager Enzo Maresca named Vardy club captain for the 2023–24 EFL Championship season. On 29 April 2024, he netted twice in a 3–0 away victory against Preston, clinching the title for Leicester City and catapulting them straight back into the Premier League.

On 7 June 2024, Vardy announced he had signed a new one-year deal with the club. On 19 August, in Leicester's first match after their return to the Premier League, Vardy netted an equaliser against Tottenham Hotspur to help his team draw 1–1. Following Leicester City's confirmed relegation from the Premier League after a 1–0 home defeat to Liverpool, Vardy described the 2024–25 season as a "total embarrassment" and issued a heartfelt apology to fans.

On 24 April 2025, it was announced that Vardy would leave Leicester at the end of the 2024–25 season. Vardy was the last remaining player from Leicester's 2016 title success still at the club.

Vardy's last game for Leicester was on 18 May 2025 against Ipswich Town, in the club's last home game, and second-last game of the season. Leicester confirmed that he would not play the club's final game away at Bournemouth to ensure a proper send-off in front of the Leicester fans. His final game also happened to be his 500th game for Leicester, and played on the exact date he signed for Leicester 13 years earlier (18 May 2012). In the game, Vardy scored his 200th goal for Leicester in the 28th minute, before going off to a standing ovation in the 80th minute as Leicester secured a 2–0 victory.

=== Cremonese ===
On 1 September 2025, Serie A club Cremonese announced the signing of Vardy as a free transfer on a one-year contract with an extension option. On 15 September, he made his debut as a substitute in an away goalless draw against Hellas Verona. A month later, on 25 October, he scored his first goal in a 1–1 draw with Atalanta. On 1 December, he scored twice in a 3–1 away win over Bologna, his first Serie A brace, as Cremonese ended Bologna's 12-match unbeaten run in all competitions. He subsequently won the Serie A Player of the Month award for November, the first English player to do so. He concluded the season with seven league goals, but the club's relegation led to his departure at the end of the season.

=== Burnley ===
On 6 September 2026, Vardy returned to England, signing for EFL Championship club Burnley on a one-season contract as a free agent.

== International career ==
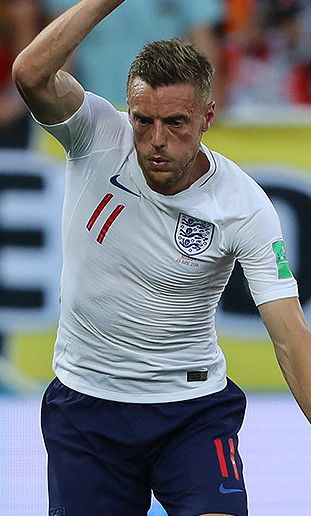
Vardy playing for England at the 2018 FIFA World Cup

On 21 May 2015, Vardy was called up to the England national team for the first time ahead of a friendly against the Republic of Ireland and a UEFA Euro 2016 qualifying match against Slovenia. He made his debut on 7 June in the goalless draw against the Republic of Ireland at the Aviva Stadium in Dublin, replacing England captain, Wayne Rooney, for the final 15 minutes. On 30 August, Vardy was again called up to the England squad for the matches against San Marino and Switzerland in UEFA Euro 2016 qualifying, being selected in the starting line-up as England ran out 6–0 winners against San Marino in Serravalle six days later. Vardy scored his first international goal on 26 March 2016, equalising with a back heel from Nathaniel Clyne's cross, as a substitute in a 3–2 away win against Germany. He scored again, three days later, the opening goal in a 2–1 defeat to the Netherlands at Wembley Stadium.

Vardy made his tournament debut on 16 June, in England's second group match at UEFA Euro 2016, coming off the bench in the second half to score an equalising goal against Wales, helping his team come from behind to win the match 2–1. During the tournament, there were media rumours of a feud between Vardy and fellow striker Rooney, which were denied by manager Roy Hodgson.

Vardy was named in the 23-man England squad for the 2018 FIFA World Cup. He was used sparingly during the tournament, starting only the final group stage match against Belgium as England reached the World Cup semi-finals for only the third time in their history. On 28 August 2018, Vardy stepped aside from the England national team, telling manager Gareth Southgate that he did not want to be considered for selection unless there was an injury crisis.

== Player profile ==
=== Impact of playing non-League football ===
Vardy's journey to the top flight is unique by virtue of his long spell in non-League football. Prior to his Premier League debut at the age of 27, he had already played in levels eight, seven, six, five and two of the English football league system. He has cited his late arrival in the Premier League as a key reason why he is able to maintain longevity in football and still play intensively into his mid-thirties, stating that "My legs feel great and people say the older you get your pace goes, but it's not affecting that side of things as of yet. Hopefully because I came into the game later, it means I've got longer to go."

Pundits have drawn parallels between Vardy's playing style and non-League football. Sky Sports pundit and former England assistant manager Gary Neville has said: "When he came onto the scene, he was raw and aggressive. I used to say he played like a non-league player in the Premier League. His game has become more polished, more smooth, [with] more subtlety".

=== Style of play ===
In 2020, FourFourTwo listed Vardy as one of the best strikers in world football due to his elite finishing ability, speed and positional awareness. Ian Wright, who also rose from non-League football to the Premier League and England national team, wrote in October 2015 that Vardy could be England's equivalent to Salvatore Schillaci at UEFA Euro 2016; Schillaci, another late bloomer, began the 1990 FIFA World Cup as a substitute behind more established players, and ended it as the top scorer. Wright, who first learnt of Vardy when his former Burnley teammate Micky Mellon signed him for Fleetwood, rates Vardy as a hard-working player with a good first touch, who creates constant work for defenders, and plays by instinct instead of being moulded by his managers. Although Vardy usually plays in a central role as a striker, he is a versatile player who is capable of playing in several attacking positions, and has also been used as a winger.

In addition to his prolific goalscoring, Vardy is known for his high work rate, relentless running, direct approach, two-footedness and ability to link play. He is considered an extremely fast and dynamic striker, with good positioning, and an excellent sense of space in the area. These traits enable him to play on the last defender's shoulder, time his runs to beat the defensive line and stretch opponents, which, combined with his pace and clinical finishing, makes him a threat on counter-attacks which suits the style of Leicester City teams. Vardy is also an accurate penalty taker, having converted 26 penalties in the Premier League. He also has good aerial ability whilst also being capable of striking the ball powerfully with either foot. Gary Neville commented on how Vardy's approach influences teammates: "He sets the tempo and the tone for the rest of the team and gives no other player behind him any excuse for not working hard."

=== Lifestyle and approach to training ===
According to Leicester vice-chairman Aiyawatt Srivaddhanaprabha, Vardy drank heavily every night during his early days at the club, and would turn up at training still intoxicated. Srivaddhanaprabha discussed with Vardy what he expected in his life, and Vardy gave up drinking and took training more seriously from then on.

Other pundits, such as Jamie Jackson, have said Vardy refocused after the earlier night-club assault incident, and that the earlier arrival of Ella, his first daughter, was a stabilising force.

During UEFA Euro 2016, Vardy spoke to the media about his unusual lifestyle choices for a professional sportsperson. He said that he does not exercise in a gym, and that he consumes Red Bull caffeinated beverages and snus smokeless tobacco.

== Personal life ==
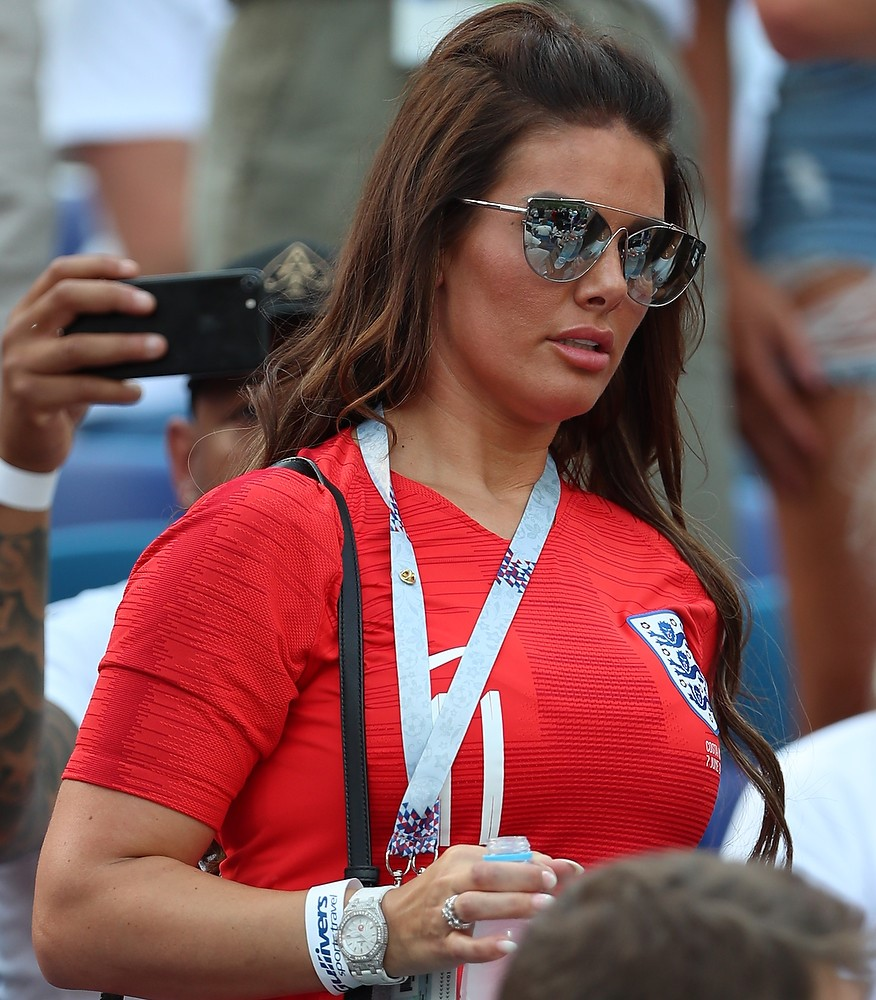
Vardy's wife Rebekah supporting him at the 2018 FIFA World Cup

Vardy is a fan of Sheffield Wednesday, one of the clubs in his home town.

Before turning professional, Vardy combined playing non-League football with a job as a technician making medical splints. In 2007, he received a conviction for assault following an incident outside a pub, and had to play with an electronic tag fitted for six months, while his curfew also limited his playing time at Stocksbridge Park Steels.

In August 2015, The Sun on Sunday published a video of Vardy at a casino the previous month, calling a man of East Asian origin a "Jap". He apologised for a "regrettable error of judgement" and was fined by Leicester, who put him on an educational course.

Vardy met Rebekah Nicholson in 2014 while she was working as a nightclub promoter. The couple married on 25 May 2016 at Peckforton Castle in Cheshire, with David Nugent as the best man. Vardy has four biological children: three with his wife, and one from a previous relationship. He is also a stepfather to two children from his wife's previous relationships.

In November 2015, Vardy launched V9 Academy, an annual week-long camp designed to offer coaching and guidance to 60 non-League players and offer them the opportunity to showcase their talent in front of scouts from league clubs. The same month, Stocksbridge Park Steels named their main stand after him. In December 2015, the Leicester-based food manufacturer Walkers brought out a limited edition 'Vardy Salted' crisp flavour, in recognition of Vardy's goalscoring run. Adrian Butchart, English writer of the Goal! series of football-related fiction films, finished a script in 2016 for a film about Vardy. Vardy is an ambassador for Dorothy Goodman School, a special education school in Hinckley, Leicestershire.

On 15 June 2021, Vardy acquired a minority stake in American soccer club Rochester Rhinos, later renamed as Rochester New York FC. Vardy was a co-owner of the club with David and Wendy Dworkin, who bought the club in 2016. The club ceased operations in March 2023.

In November 2025, Vardy's villa in Salò, Italy, was burgled while he was away on duty for Cremonese, with thieves stealing valuables worth approximately £80,000. In April 2026, ITV announced a new reality series titled The Vardys, following Vardy and his family as they move to Italy. The series documented their new life abroad, including their family challenges and Rebekah's reflections on the Wagatha Christie controversy. Following the burglary, Rebekah returned to the UK with their children, while Vardy remained in Italy for the rest of the 2025–26 season. On 12 May 2026, Netflix released a documentary about Vardy as part of their Untold series, titled "Untold UK: Jamie Vardy".

In August 2026, Vardy became a Bundesliga rights holder, with his YouTube channel, "Jamie Vardy's Having a Party", set to broadcast seven Friday-night matches during the 2026–27 season.

== Selected works ==
- Vardy, Jamie (2016). From Nowhere: My Story. London: Ebury Digital. ISBN 9781473550469.
- Vardy, Jamie; Vardy, Rebekah (2022). Cedric: The Little Sloth with a Big Dream. Exeter: Little Brother Books Limited. ISBN 978-1912342242.

== Career statistics ==
=== Club ===
As of match played 3 November 2026

Appearances and goals by club, season and competition
| Club | Season | League | | | FA Cup | | EFL Cup | | Europe | | Other | | Total | |
| Club | Season | Division | Apps | Goals | Apps | Goals | Apps | Goals | Apps | Goals | Apps | Goals | Apps | Goals |
|---|---|---|---|---|---|---|---|---|---|---|---|---|---|---|
| Stocksbridge; Park Steels | 2005–06 (Note: Source only includes data for the 2005–06 season up to and including 6 April 2006) | NPL Division One | 0 | 0 | 0 | 0 | — | | — | | 1 (Note: Appearance in Sheffield & Hallamshire Senior Cup) | 0 | 1 | 0 |
| Stocksbridge; Park Steels | 2006–07 | NPL Division One | 3 | 0 | 1 | 0 | — | | — | | 0 | 0 | 4 | 0 |
| Stocksbridge; Park Steels | 2007–08 | NPL Division One South | 29 | 10 | 3 | 1 | — | | — | | 5 (Note: One appearance one goal in FA Trophy, two appearances in Northern Premier League Challenge Cup, one appearance two goals in Northern Premier League President's Cup, one appearance in Sheffield & Hallamshire Senior Cup) | 3 | 37 | 14 |
| Stocksbridge; Park Steels | 2008–09 | NPL Division One South | 33 | 16 | 2 | 1 | — | | — | | 12 (Note: Three appearances three goals in FA Trophy, two appearances in Northern Premier League Challenge Cup, one appearance in Northern Premier League President's Cup, four appearances one goal in Sheffield & Hallamshire Senior Cup, two appearances one goal in Northern Premier League D1 South play-offs) | 5 | 47 | 22 |
| Stocksbridge; Park Steels | 2009–10 | NPL Premier Division | 23 | 14 | 1 | 2 | — | | — | | 2 (Note: One appearance one goal in Northern Premier League Challenge Cup, one appearance two goals in Sheffield & Hallamshire Senior Cup) | 3 | 26 | 19 |
| Stocksbridge; Park Steels | Total | | 88 | 40 | 7 | 4 | — | | — | | 20 | 11 | 115 | 55 |
| FC Halifax Town | 2010–11 | NPL Premier Division | 33 | 23 | 3 | 1 | — | | — | | 1 (Note: Appearance in FA Trophy) | 1 | 37 | 25 |
| FC Halifax Town | 2011–12 | Conference North | 4 | 3 | — | | — | | — | | — | | 4 | 3 |
| FC Halifax Town | Total | | 37 | 26 | 3 | 1 | — | | — | | 1 | 1 | 41 | 28 |
| Fleetwood Town | 2011–12 | Conference Premier | 36 | 31 | 6 | 3 | — | | — | | 0 | 0 | 42 | 34 |
| Leicester City | 2012–13 | Championship | 26 | 4 | 2 | 0 | 1 | 1 | — | | — | | 29 | 5 |
| Leicester City | 2013–14 | Championship | 37 | 16 | 1 | 0 | 3 | 0 | — | | — | | 41 | 16 |
| Leicester City | 2014–15 | Premier League | 34 | 5 | 2 | 0 | 0 | 0 | — | | — | | 36 | 5 |
| Leicester City | 2015–16 | Premier League | 36 | 24 | 1 | 0 | 1 | 0 | — | | — | | 38 | 24 |
| Leicester City | 2016–17 | Premier League | 35 | 13 | 2 | 0 | 1 | 0 | 9 (Note: Appearances in UEFA Champions League) | 2 | 1 (Note: Appearance in FA Community Shield) | 1 | 48 | 16 |
| Leicester City | 2017–18 | Premier League | 37 | 20 | 3 | 2 | 2 | 1 | — | | — | | 42 | 23 |
| Leicester City | 2018–19 | Premier League | 34 | 18 | 0 | 0 | 2 | 0 | — | | — | | 36 | 18 |
| Leicester City | 2019–20 | Premier League | 35 | 23 | 1 | 0 | 4 | 0 | — | | — | | 40 | 23 |
| Leicester City | 2020–21 | Premier League | 34 | 15 | 4 | 0 | 0 | 0 | 4 (Note: Appearances in UEFA Europa League) | 2 | — | | 42 | 17 |
| Leicester City | 2021–22 | Premier League | 25 | 15 | 0 | 0 | 1 | 2 | 6 (Note: Four appearances in UEFA Europa League, two appearances in UEFA Europa Conference League) | 0 | 1 | 0 | 33 | 17 |
| Leicester City | 2022–23 | Premier League | 37 | 3 | 2 | 0 | 3 | 3 | — | | — | | 42 | 6 |
| Leicester City | 2023–24 | Championship | 35 | 18 | 1 | 1 | 1 | 1 | — | | — | | 37 | 20 |
| Leicester City | 2024–25 | Premier League | 35 | 9 | 1 | 1 | 0 | 0 | — | | — | | 36 | 10 |
| Leicester City | Total | | 440 | 183 | 20 | 4 | 19 | 8 | 19 | 4 | 2 | 1 | 500 | 200 |
| Cremonese | 2025–26 | Serie A | 29 | 7 | — | | — | | — | | — | | 29 | 7 |
| Burnley | 2026–27 | Championship | 7 | 1 | 0 | 0 | — | | — | | — | | 7 | 1 |
| Career total | | | 637 | 288 | 36 | 12 | 19 | 8 | 19 | 4 | 23 | 13 | 734 | 325 |

=== International ===
Appearances and goals by national team and year
| National team | Year | Apps | Goals |
|---|---|---|---|
| England | 2015 | 4 | 0 |
| England | 2016 | 10 | 5 |
| England | 2017 | 5 | 1 |
| England | 2018 | 7 | 1 |
| Total | | 26 | 7 |

England score listed first, score column indicates score after each Vardy goal

List of international goals scored by Jamie Vardy
| No. | Date | Venue | Cap | Opponent | Score | Result | Competition | Ref. |
|---|---|---|---|---|---|---|---|---|
| 1 | 26 March 2016 | Olympiastadion, Berlin, Germany | 5 | Germany | 2–2 | 3–2 | Friendly | |
| 2 | 29 March 2016 | Wembley Stadium, London, England | 6 | Netherlands | 1–0 | 1–2 | Friendly | |
| 3 | 22 May 2016 | Etihad Stadium, Manchester, England | 7 | Turkey | 2–1 | 2–1 | Friendly | |
| 4 | 16 June 2016 | Stade Bollaert-Delelis, Lens, France | 9 | Wales | 1–1 | 2–1 | UEFA Euro 2016 | |
| 5 | 15 November 2016 | Wembley Stadium, London, England | 14 | Spain | 2–0 | 2–2 | Friendly | |
| 6 | 26 March 2017 | Wembley Stadium, London, England | 16 | Lithuania | 2–0 | 2–0 | 2018 FIFA World Cup qualification | |
| 7 | 27 March 2018 | Wembley Stadium, London, England | 21 | Italy | 1–0 | 1–1 | Friendly | |

== Honours ==
Stocksbridge Park Steels

- Northern Premier League Division One South play-offs: 2008–09
- Sheffield & Hallamshire Senior Cup: 2008–09

FC Halifax Town

- Northern Premier League Premier Division: 2010–11

Fleetwood Town

- Conference Premier: 2011–12

Leicester City

- Premier League: 2015–16
- FA Cup: 2020–21
- Football League/EFL Championship: 2013–14, 2023–24
- FA Community Shield: 2021

Individual

- Premier League Player of the Season: 2015–16
- FWA Footballer of the Year: 2015–16
- Premier League Golden Boot: 2019–20
- Premier League Player of the Month: October 2015, November 2015, April 2019, October 2019
- Premier League Goal of the Month: March 2018
- BBC Goal of the Season: 2017–18
- PFA Team of the Year: 2015–16 Premier League, 2019–20 Premier League
- Serie A Player of the Month: November 2025
- Conference Premier Player of the Month: November 2011
- Conference Premier Team of the Year: 2011–12
- Conference Premier Top Goalscorer: 2011–12
- Leicester City Player of the Season: 2019–20, 2024–25
- Leicester City Players' Player of the Season: 2013–14, 2019–20, 2024–25
- Premier League Milestone Award (100 goals), (300 appearances)
- Northern Premier League's Greatest Player: 1978–2018
- Northern Premier League's Greatest XI: 1978–2018
