= Goal 3 =

Goal 3 may refer to:

- Goal III: Taking on the World, a 2009 film
- Sustainable Development Goal 3, a goal established by the United Nations in 2015
