= Mike Elliott (comedian) =

English stand-up comedian (1946–2014)

- Born: Michael Elliott; 17 July 1946; Sunderland, County Durham, England
- Died: 23 December 2014 (aged 68)
- Other name: Mike the Mouth
- Occupations: Stand-up comedian, actor, radio personality, comedian

Michael Elliott (17 July 1946 – 23 December 2014), also known as Mike the Mouth, was an English comedian, actor, television presenter and radio personality.

== Early life ==
Elliott was born in Sunderland. He attended St Cuthbert's RC Primary in Grindon, Sunderland, and St Aidan's RC Grammar School in Ashbrooke, Sunderland. He later taught English and Drama at Hartlepool's Dyke House School.

Elliot was a member of The Northern Front Folk Band, which operated for a year focusing on "folk music hall." The band established a club at The Londonderry pub in Sunderland, where Elliott served as organizer and compere. The group, featuring Mike alongside Ed Pickford and Nick Fenwick, performed on the folk music circuit.

In 1983, he first found national fame on At Last, It's Mike Elliott, broadcast on Channel 4. For several years, he was a mainstay of Lindisfarne's UK tours, working as warm up and compere.

He released two albums on Newcastle-based Rubber Records: Out of the Brown RUB 025 (1976) and At Last It's Mike Elliott RUB 044 (1982). In 1992, Elliott returned to work for Tyne Tees Television, presenting a number of regional documentary series, including Down Colliery Way, about miners in England's northeast.

=== Acting ===
Elliott had a number of acting roles, including the boxing coach George Watson in Billy Elliot, and a number of roles in television drama series, including Crocodile Shoes, Byker Grove, Spender, Harry, and New Voices. He played a taxi driver in Goal and Goal! 3: Taking on the World.

=== Radio ===
In February 1995, Elliott was given a new nickname as "Mike the Mouth" when he launched the first late night talk show on 100-102 Century FM in the North East. He was suspended in his first year at the station for swearing at a woman caller who said she was a benefits swindler, but was reinstated after fans protested outside of the station's studios in Gateshead. In January 2000, he was taken off the air in the middle of his show, following an expletive-filled outburst at a caller. Bosses sacked him, assuming, from his behaviour and slurred speech, that he was drunk. However, Elliott claimed that his "strange behavior" was caused by combining two glasses of wine during a family meal with the cold remedies Benylin and Night Nurse. In June that year, he was reinstated by the station.

In 2001, he launched a board game called Social Insecurity, with some similarities to Monopoly.

In December 2002, a new Mike Elliott radio show launched on North East Magic Radio in the same slot as his previous program. However, on MW, it failed to gain the same number of listeners that the Century FM series had achieved and Elliott was released from his contract in July 2003. In December 2003, Elliott went back on air on Sunderland's Sun FM. In January 2005, Elliot was a co-presenter on a new radio show called North South Divided, pitching the northern stations of the Local Radio Company against their southern counterparts. Broadcast over almost 30 stations, this was the first time listeners outside of the North East had a taste of Elliott, alongside another presenter, Alex Dyke (who was later replaced by Carol McGiffin). On 5 July 2006, North South Divided ended.

== Death ==
On 23 December 2014, Elliott died of esophageal cancer at age 68.
