= I Love Your Work =

2005 film by Adam Goldberg

- I Love Your Work Promotional Movie Poster
- Directed by: Adam Goldberg
- Written by: Adrian Butchart; Adam Goldberg
- Produced by: Chris Hanley; David Hillary; Josh Newman; Adam Goldberg; Michael Williams
- Starring: Giovanni Ribisi; Franka Potente; Christina Ricci; Joshua Jackson; Marisa Coughlan; Jason Lee; Lake Bell; Vince Vaughn; Rick Hoffman; Shalom Harlow; Jared Harris; Elvis Costello
- Cinematography: Mark Putnam
- Edited by: Zac Bell
- Music by: Steven Drozd; Adam Goldberg
- Distributed by: THINKFilm
- Release date: November 4, 2005
- Running time: 111 minutes
- Country: United States
- Language: English
- Budget: $1.6 million

I Love Your Work is an American psychological thriller film completed in 2003 and released theatrically in 2005. The film was directed by Adam Goldberg and written by Goldberg and Adrian Butchart. An indictment of celebrity culture, it was not a commercial success. The cast includes Giovanni Ribisi, Christina Ricci, and Vince Vaughn. The movie premiered on September 5, 2003 at the Toronto International Film Festival.

The DVD was distributed by THINKFilm on March 28, 2006.

== Plot ==
Gray Evans, a movie star, is losing his grip on reality, unable to adjust to his own celebrity, and addicted to romantic fantasies about idealistic love and his once simple life. With his celebrity marriage to the beautiful actress Mia already strained by jealousy and frustration after only a year together, Gray is looking for escape. An avid photographer, his voyeuristic nature leads him to a local video store, where an encounter with the video clerk's wife Jane leads to a dangerous obsession over what he imagines to be an ideal love. Gray falls further over the edge, as his conceptions of love and reality are further blurred by the similarities between Jane and his ex-girlfriend Shana to the point where obsession becomes delusion. Gray's life is further complicated by the realities of his own celebrity, an obsessive fan and the need for him to create his public persona as a successful man with a successful marriage. Profession, obsession, and delusion twist together beyond repair when Gray pulls the video clerk, an ambitious screenwriter, into his world by offering to make a movie with him. Their relationship succeeds in bringing him closer to Jane but takes away any last hold on reality, as his fantasy leads to destruction. The layered narrative swings around on itself, taking us on a journey through love, madness and paranoia all the while holding on to a darkly comic view of its own absurd world of crazy Russian bodyguards, loyal assistants, playboy producers and true celebrity.

== Cast ==
- Giovanni Ribisi as Gray Evans
- Franka Potente as Mia
- Joshua Jackson as John Everhart
- Marisa Coughlan as Jane Styros
- Christina Ricci as Shana
- Jason Lee as Larry Hortense
- Rick Hoffman as Gray's Attorney
- Vince Vaughn as Stiev
- Shalom Harlow as Charlotte
- Jared Harris as Jehud
- Lake Bell as Felicia
- Elvis Costello as Himself
- Haylie Duff as Fan

== Reception ==
Rotten Tomatoes gives the film a 23% rating from 31 critics.
