= Stephen Dillane =

British actor (born 1957)

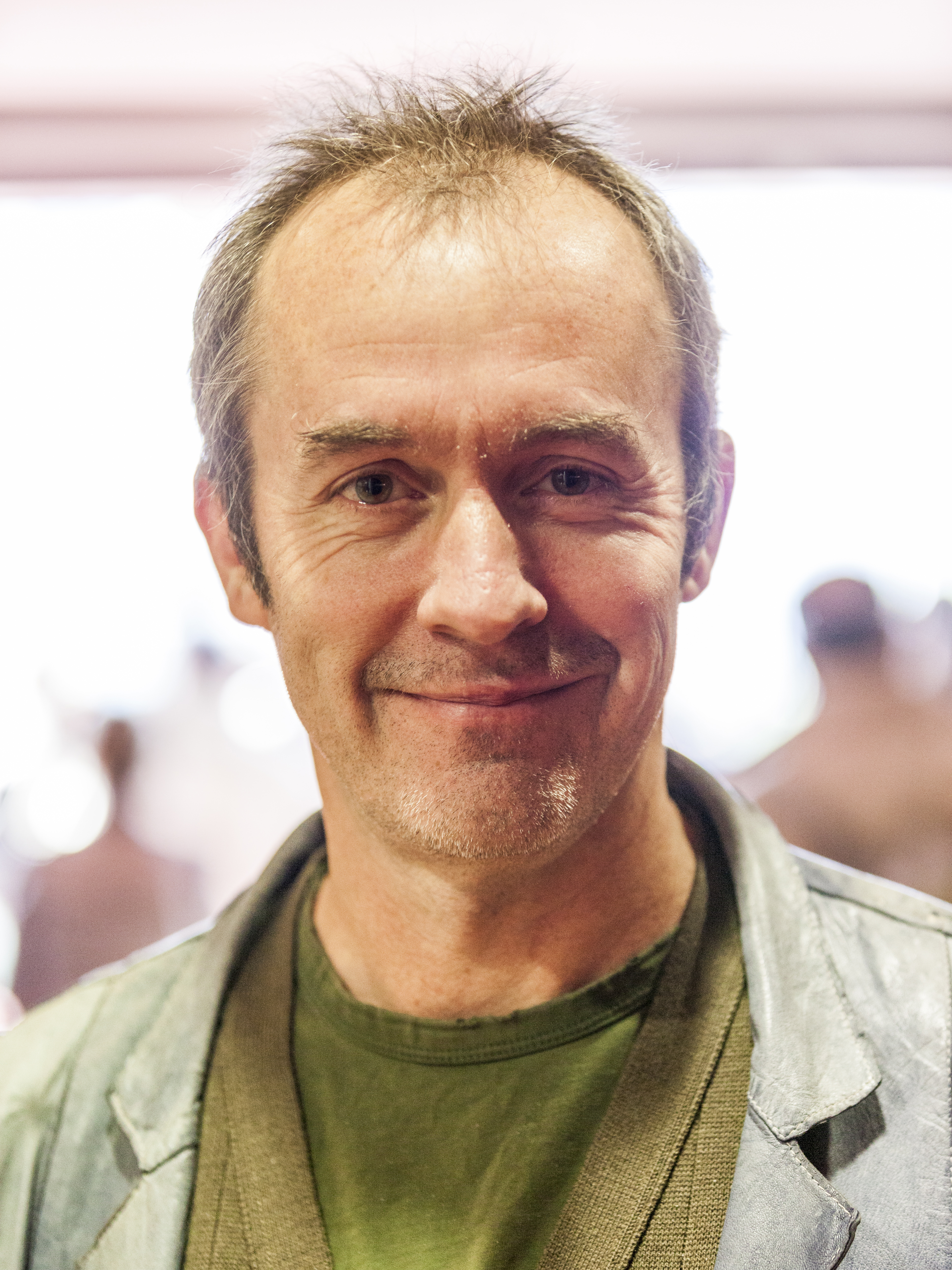
- Dillane at the 2012 Dinard British Film Festival
- Born: Stephen John Dillane; 27 March 1957 (age 69); London, England
- Education: University of Exeter; Bristol Old Vic Theatre School
- Occupation: Actor
- Years active: 1985–present
- Spouse: Naomi Wirthner
- Children: 2, including Frank Dillane
- Relatives: Richard Dillane (brother)

Stephen John Dillane (/dɪˈleɪn/; born 27 March 1957) is a British actor. He is best known for his roles as Leonard Woolf in the 2002 film The Hours, Stannis Baratheon in the HBO fantasy series Game of Thrones (2012–2015) and Thomas Jefferson in the HBO miniseries John Adams (2008), a part which earned him a Primetime Emmy nomination. An experienced stage actor who has been called an "actor's actor", Dillane won a Tony Award for his lead performance in Tom Stoppard's play The Real Thing (2000) and gave critically acclaimed performances in Angels in America (1993), Hamlet (1990), and a one-man Macbeth (2005). His television work has additionally garnered him BAFTA and International Emmy Awards for best actor.

== Early life and education ==
Dillane was born in Kensington, London, to an English mother, Bridget (née Curwen), and an Irish-Australian surgeon father, John Dillane. The eldest of his siblings (his younger brother Richard is also an actor), he grew up in West Wickham, Kent.

At school, Dillane began performing in end-of-term plays and had "a certain facility" for funny accents. He often found himself in women's roles, which he says "wasn’t good for my confused adolescent psyche", but also recalls a part in Rosencrantz and Guildenstern Are Dead as being particularly memorable, noting that shouting "Fire!" as Rosencrantz while pointing at the audience was "a very thrilling thing to be able to do."

He studied history and politics at the University of Exeter, concentrating on the Russian Revolution, and afterward became a journalist for the Croydon Advertiser. Unhappy in his career, he read one day how actor Trevor Eve gave up architecture for acting; this, along with reading Hamlet and Peter Brook's The Empty Space back-to-back, made him "light up inside somewhere" and spurred him to enter the Bristol Old Vic Theatre School at 25. During his early acting career, he was known as Stephen Dillon but reverted to his birth name in the 1990s.

== Career ==
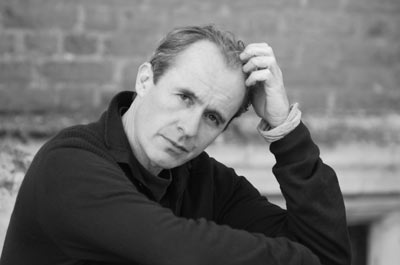
Dillane in October 2009

Dillane is an experienced theatre actor; his notable roles include Archer in The Beaux' Stratagem (Royal National Theatre, 1989), Prior Walter in Angels in America (1993), Hamlet (1994), Clov in Samuel Beckett's Endgame (1996), Uncle Vanya (1998), Henry in Tom Stoppard's The Real Thing (for which he won a Tony Award in 2000), The Coast of Utopia (2002), and a one-man version of Macbeth (2005) directed by Travis Preston. He has also performed T.S. Eliot's Four Quartets in London and New York City, and was seen in the 2010 Bridge Project's productions of The Tempest and As You Like It.

Dillane also portrayed Horatio in the 1990 film adaptation of Hamlet. He played Michael Henderson in Welcome to Sarajevo (1997), a character based on British journalist Michael Nicholson, and the impatient and easily agitated Harker in Spy Game (2001).

Dillane is also known for his portrayal of Leonard Woolf in The Hours (2002), English professional golfer Harry Vardon in The Greatest Game Ever Played (2005) and Glen Foy in the Goal! trilogy. He also starred in John Adams as Thomas Jefferson.

He joined the cast of Game of Thrones in 2011 as Stannis Baratheon, a major contender for the throne of the fictional realm of Westeros. While admitting he had not read the books on which the series is based, he commented that the show's appeal was due to "the storytelling, the extraordinary world that’s created and the way it reflects our actual world – a naked, ruthless pursuit of power in all its forms."

In 2012, he also played Rupert Keel, head of the private security agency Byzantium, in the BBC drama series Hunted. The following year he went on to take the male lead, opposite Clémence Poésy, in the crime drama series The Tunnel, an Anglo-French remake of the Scandinavian The Bridge. Dillane, who had not seen the original series, plays Karl Roebuck, the laid-back, experienced British detective to Poésy's humourless French counterpart. His performance won him an International Emmy Award for Best Actor. In a second series in 2016, titled The Tunnel: Sabotage, he reprised his role alongside Poésy for a new case involving a deadly airliner crash in the English Channel.

Besides television, Dillane also starred in the 2012 British independent film Papadopoulos & Sons as successful entrepreneur Harry Papadopoulos, who rediscovers his life after being forced to start again from nothing in the wake of a banking crisis. His son, Frank Dillane, plays his son in the film. That same year he also had roles in the films Zero Dark Thirty and Twenty8k.

Offscreen, the actor in 2014 collaborated with visual artist Tacita Dean for the Sydney Biennale and Carriageworks in a project called Event for a Stage. The work, performed live and later adapted for radio broadcast and film, explored the process of filmmaking and the "concept of artifice on the stage" through a single actor, Dillane. The performance encompassed readings from texts as well as his personal reflections on acting, theatre, and family. 2015 saw Dillane making other brief returns to stage including a reprise of his reading of Four Quartets in London and a one-off appearance in Tim Crouch's An Oak Tree at the National Theatre.

In 2016, besides appearing in the second series of The Tunnel, Dillane returned to the Donmar Warehouse for a revival of Brian Friel's Faith Healer. His performance as Frank, an itinerant Irish healer, was described as "poetic and powerful." In addition, he appeared as artist Graham Sutherland in The Crown, Netflix's TV series about British monarch Elizabeth II. In 2017, Dillane appeared in two biopics, playing Edward Wood, 1st Earl of Halifax in Joe Wright's Darkest Hour, as the antagonist of Gary Oldman as Winston Churchill, and writer William Godwin, the father of Frankenstein author Mary Shelley, in the film Mary Shelley.

In 2018, he appeared in the film The Thin Man, which has since been retitled The Man In The Hat, opposite Ciarán Hinds; it was directed by Oscar-winning composer Stephen Warbeck.

== Personal life ==
Dillane has two sons with actress-director Naomi Wirthner: Séamus and actor Frank Dillane, with whom he co-starred in Papadopoulos & Sons.

=== Politics ===
In October 2023, Dillane signed the Artists4Ceasefire open letter to Joe Biden, President of the United States, calling for a ceasefire of the Israeli bombardment of Gaza.

== Acting credits ==
=== Film ===
Year	Title	Role	Notes
1987	Business as Usual	Mr Dunlop	
1988	An Affair in Mind	Graham Hartson	
1990	Hamlet	Horatio	
1994	La chance	Antonio	
1996	Two If by Sea	Evan Marsh	Alternate title: Stolen Hearts
1997	Welcome to Sarajevo	Michael Henderson	(Lead role)
1997	Firelight	Charles Godwin	
1997	Déjà Vu	Sean	(Lead role)
1998	Love & Rage	Dr Croly	
1999	The Darkest Light	Tom	(Lead role)
2000	Ordinary Decent Criminal	Noel Quigley	
2001	Spy Game	CIA Agent Chuck Harker	
2001	The Parole Officer	Inspector Burton	
2002	The Truth About Charlie	Charlie	
2002	The Hours	Leonard Woolf	
2003	The Gathering	Simon Kirkman	
2004	King Arthur	Merlin	
2004	Haven	Mr Allen	
2005	The Greatest Game Ever Played	Harry Vardon	
2005	Goal!	Glen Foy	
2005	Nine Lives	Martin	
2006	Klimt	Secretary	
2007	Goal II: Living the Dream	Glen Foy	
2007	Fugitive Pieces	Jakob Beer (Adult)	(Lead role)
2007	Savage Grace	Brooks Baekeland	
2008	Freakdog	Dr Harris	Original title: Red Mist
2009	44 Inch Chest	Mal	
2009	Storm	Keith Haywood	
2011	Perfect Sense	Stephen Montgomery	
2012	Papadopoulos & Sons	Harry Papadopoulos	(Lead role)
2012	Twenty8k	DCI Edward Stone	
2012	Zero Dark Thirty	National Security Adviser	
2017	Darkest Hour	Viscount Halifax	
2017	Mary Shelley	William Godwin	
2018	Outlaw King	King Edward I of England	
2019	The Professor and the Madman	Richard Brayne	
2020	The Man in the Hat	The Damp Man	
2021	Boxing Day	Richard	
2024	The Outrun	Andrew	
2026	The Uprising		Post-production
TBA	Luther 3		Filming

=== Television ===
Year	Title	Role	Notes
1985	Remington Steele	Bradford Galt	Episode: "Steel Searching: Part 1"
1986	Coronation Street	Mark Siddall	Episode: "#1.2624"
1986	ScreenPlay	George	Episode: "Shift Work"
1986	Screen Two	Reporter at Press Conference	Series 2; Episode 4: "Frankie & Johnnie"
1987	Bulman	DC Danny Keech	Episode: "White Lies"
1987	The Secret Garden	Captain Lennox	Television film
1988	The One Game	Nicholas Thorne	Mini-series; 4 episodes
1988	Christabel	Peter Bielenberg	Mini-series; 4 episodes
1988	The Face of Trespass	Gray Harston	Television film; alternate title: An Affair in Mind
1989	Comeback	Alec	Television film
1989	The Yellow Wallpaper	John	Television film
1991	Heading Home	Leonard Meopham	Series 7; Episode 1 of Screen Two
1991	Sophie	John	Television film
1991	Boon	Paul Lyle	Episode: "Help Me Make It Through the Night"
1991	The Ruth Rendell Mysteries	Philip Blackstock	Episode: "Achilles Heel"
1992	Frankie's House	Antony Strickland	Mini-series; 4 episodes
1992	Hostages	Chris Pearson	Television film
1993	You, Me and It	James Woodley	Mini-series; 3 episodes
1993	Soldier Soldier	Mike Davidson	Episode: "Hard Knocks"
1994	The Rector's Wife	Jonathan Byrne	Mini-series; 3 episodes
1995	Performance	Mr Blackmore	Episode: "The Widowing of Mrs. Holroyd"
1998	Kings in Grass Castles	Patsy	Mini-series; 2 episodes
2000	Anna Karenina	Karenin	Mini-series; 4 episodes
2001	The Cazalets	Edward Cazalet	6 episodes
2008	John Adams	Thomas Jefferson	Mini-series; 6 episodes
2008	The Shooting of Thomas Hurndall	Anthony Hurndall	Television film
2008	God on Trial	Schmidt	Television film
2010	Agatha Christie's Marple	Inspector Finch	Episode: "The Secret of Chimneys"
2012	Eternal Law	Carl	2 episodes
2012	Hunted	Rupert Keel	8 episodes
2012	Secret State	Paul J. Clark	Mini-series; 4 episodes
2012	Murder: Joint Enterprise	Arlo Raglin	Television film
2012–2015	Game of Thrones	Stannis Baratheon	24 episodes
2013	A Touch of Cloth	Macratty	2 episodes: "Undercover Cloth: Parts One & Two"
2013–2018	The Tunnel	Karl Roebuck	24 episodes
2016	The Crown	Graham Sutherland	Episode: "Assassins"
2020–2024	Alex Rider	Alan Blunt	Main role; 23 episodes
2021	Vigil	Rear Admiral Shaw	Mini-series; 6 episodes
2021	Red Election	MI5 director William Ogilvy	10 episodes
2024	Kaos	Prometheus	8 episodes
2024	Sherwood	Roy Branson	Series 2; 6 episodes

=== Theatre ===
==== Selected credits ====
Title	Year	Role	Venue
1989	The Beaux' Stratagem	Archer	Royal National Theatre
1990	Long Day's Journey into Night	Edmund Tyrone	Royal National Theatre
1993–1994	Angels in America	Prior Walter	Royal National Theatre
1994–1995	Hamlet	Prince Hamlet	International Tour and Gielgud Theatre
1996	Endgame	Clov	Donmar Warehouse
1998	Uncle Vanya	Vanya	Young Vic Theatre
1999–2000	The Real Thing	Henry	Donmar, West End, Broadway
2002	The Coast of Utopia	Alexander Herzen	Royal National Theatre
2004–2006	Macbeth	Various	Almeida Theatre, Various
2010	As You Like It	Jaques	Tour including Old Vic and Brooklyn Academy of Music
2010	The Tempest	Prospero	Tour including Old Vic and Brooklyn Academy of Music
2010–2011	The Master Builder	Halvard Solness	Almeida Theatre
2016	Faith Healer	Francis Hardy	Donmar Warehouse
2019	When We Have Sufficiently Tortured Each Other	Man	Royal National Theatre
2026	The Lives of Others	Gerd Wiesler	Adelphi Theatre

== Awards and nominations ==
Year	Award	Work	Result
1995	Richard Burton Shakespeare Globe Award	Hamlet	Won
1998	AACTA Award for Best Actor in a Leading Role in a Television Drama	Kings in Grass Castles	Won
1999	Evening Standard Award for Best Actor	The Real Thing	Won
2000	Laurence Olivier Award for Best Actor	The Real Thing	Nominated
2000	Tony Award for Best Performance by a Leading Actor in a Play	The Real Thing	Won
2000	Outer Critics Circle Award for Outstanding Actor in a Play	The Real Thing	Nominated
2000	Drama Desk Award for Outstanding Actor in a Play	The Real Thing	Won
2003	Actor Award for Outstanding Performance by a Cast in a Motion Picture	The Hours	Nominated
2004	London Film Critics' Circle Award for British Supporting Actor of the Year	The Hours	Nominated
2006	Helpmann Awards for Best Actor in a Play	Macbeth	Nominated
2008	Primetime Emmy Award for Outstanding Supporting Actor in a Miniseries or a Movie	John Adams	Nominated
2009	British Academy Television Award for Best Actor	The Shooting of Thomas Hurndall	Won
2010	San Diego Film Critics Society Award for Best Performance by an Ensemble	44 Inch Chest	Won
2014	Royal Television Society Programme Award for Best Male Actor	The Tunnel	Nominated
2014	International Emmy Award for Best Actor	The Tunnel	Won
2016	Critics' Circle Theatre Award for Best Actor	Faith Healer	Won
2019	Irish Times Irish Theatre Awards for Best Actor	How It Is: Part One	Nominated
2023	The Offie for Lead Performance in a Play	How It Is: Part Two	Nominated

== See also ==
- List of British actors
- List of International Emmy Award winners
