= Jaume Collet-Serra =

Spanish filmmaker (born 1974)

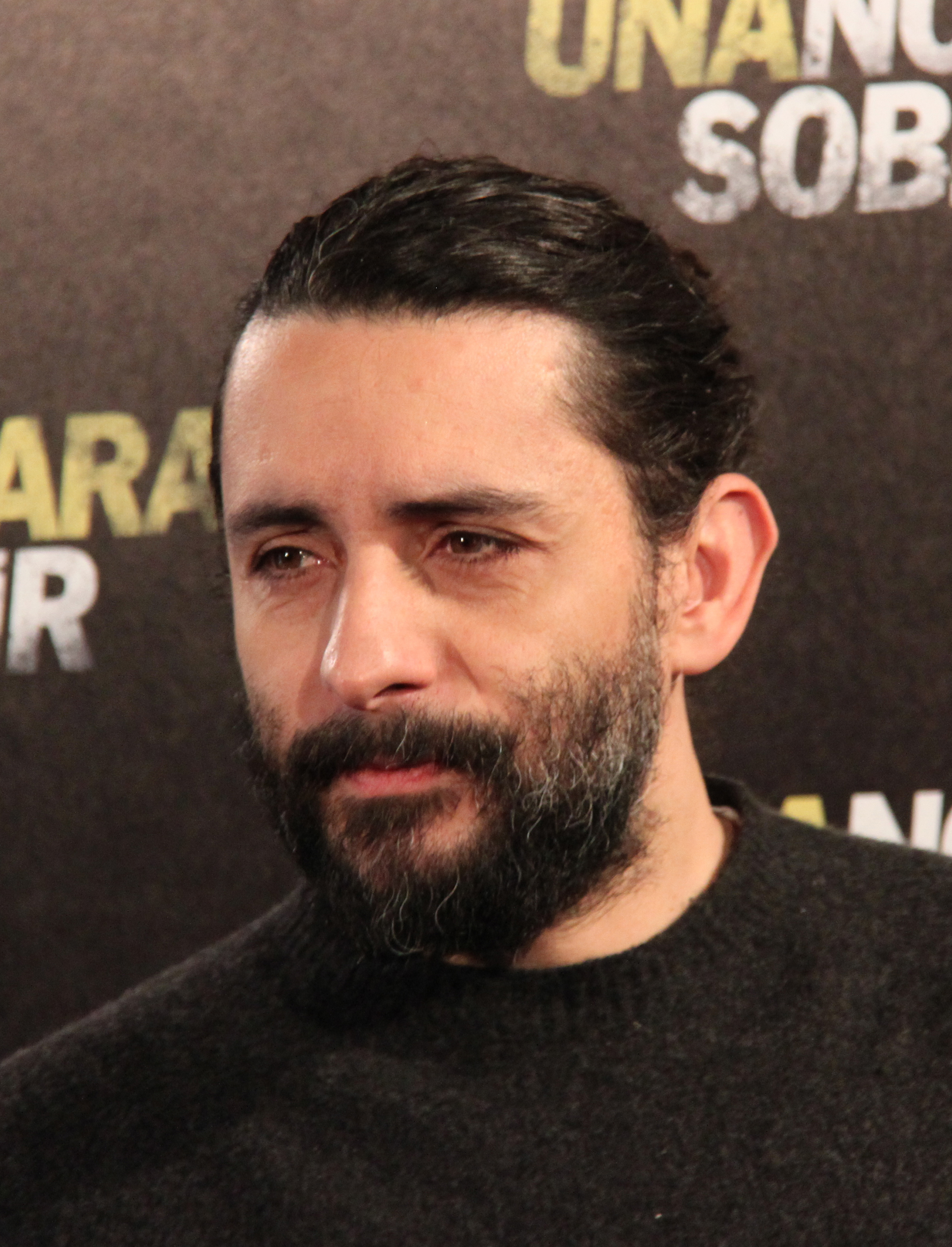
- Collet-Serra in June 2015
- Born: 23 March 1974 (age 52); Sant Iscle de Vallalta, Catalonia, Spain
- Education: Columbia College Hollywood
- Occupations: Film director; producer
- Years active: 1998–present
- Website: jaumecolletserra.com

Jaume Collet-Serra (Catalan: [ˈʒawmə kuˈʎɛt ˈsɛrə]; born 23 March 1974) is a Spanish film director and producer. He directed the horror films House of Wax (2005), Orphan (2009), and The Shallows (2016), and is known for his collaborations with Liam Neeson on the thriller films Unknown (2011), Non-Stop (2014), Run All Night (2015) and The Commuter (2018), and Dwayne Johnson on the blockbuster films Jungle Cruise (2021) and Black Adam (2022). His 2024 film Carry-On had the second-most views ever on Netflix as of March 2025.

== Early life ==
Collet-Serra was born in Sant Iscle de Vallalta, in the Catalan province of Barcelona, in Spain. At the age of 18, he moved to Los Angeles, California and attended Columbia College Hollywood, working as an editor on the side. After graduating in 1996, he began directing music videos and television commercials for brands such as PlayStation, Budweiser, and Verizon.

== Career ==
=== 2005–2010 ===
In 2005, Collet-Serra was given an opportunity to direct his first feature film by producer Joel Silver. The film, House of Wax, was a remake of the 1953 film of the same name, and starred Elisha Cuthbert and Chad Michael Murray and featured Paris Hilton. Despite a negative critical reception, it was a financial success. Two years later, Collet-Serra directed Goal II: Living the Dream, the second film in the Goal! film trilogy, in which the main character, star Mexican footballer Santiago Muñez (Kuno Becker), goes to play for Real Madrid. Collet-Serra reunited with producer Silver for his third film, Orphan, a 2009 American psychological horror film starring Vera Farmiga, Peter Sarsgaard, and Isabelle Fuhrman, about on a couple who, after the death of their unborn child, adopt a mysterious nine-year-old girl. The film received mixed critical reviews but was a box office success, earning around $80 million on a $20 million budget.

=== 2011–2015 ===
Collet-Serra then directed Unknown, a 2011 action thriller starring Liam Neeson, Diane Kruger, January Jones, Aidan Quinn, Bruno Ganz, and Frank Langella. The film is based on the 2003 French novel published in English as Out of My Head, by Didier Van Cauwelaert. Collet-Serra made his television directing debut with the ABC pilot The River, a horror drama from Paranormal Activity writer-director Oren Peli. The show was met with generally favourable reviews. In December 2012, he began filming for his next film Non-Stop, which starred Liam Neeson and Julianne Moore.

Collet-Serra formed his own production house Ombra Films. With money from StudioCanal, the small company set out to make low-budget English-language horror films, with an eye toward launching the careers of up-and-coming Spanish filmmakers. Juan Sola, Collet-Serra's producing partner, told Deadline Hollywood, "We've seen how many talented directors are coming out of Spain, but there hasn't really been a platform for them to find work in films. They look up to Jaume as a guy they want to become and we thought, how about a company that creates a bridge between Spain and the U.S., similar to what Luc Besson provided in France? Already, we are being bombarded, and we feel directors will find Ombra a fantastic platform. Jaume loves mentoring new talent." The venture's first film was Mindscape, a psychological thriller about a man with the ability to enter people's memories, starring Taissa Farmiga, Mark Strong, and Brian Cox. Collet-Serra executive produced the found footage comedy-horror film Hooked Up, which was directed by Pablo Larcuen and was shot on an iPhone.

=== 2016–present ===
Collet-Serra directed and executive produced The Shallows, a 2016 horror-thriller starring Blake Lively, from a script by Anthony Jaswinski, and The Commuter, an action-thriller starring Liam Neeson, which was released on January 12, 2018, and also features Vera Farmiga, Sam Neill, and Elizabeth McGovern.

Collet-Serra served as director for Jungle Cruise from The Walt Disney Company, starring Dwayne Johnson. The film was based on the concept of the ride of the same name at Disneyland.

In June 2019, Collet-Serra signed on to direct Black Adam, written by Adam Sztykiel and starring Dwayne Johnson. Johnson served as a producer on the project alongside Hiram Garcia, Dany Garcia, Beau Flynn, and Scott Sheldon. Collet-Serra emerged as the frontrunner to direct after his work on Jungle Cruise. The film is a co-production between Warner Bros. Pictures, New Line Cinema, DC Films, Seven Bucks Productions, and FlynnPicturesCo. film studios. Production began in April 2021.

In 2021, Collet-Serra began directing the Netflix thriller Carry-On. It follows a TSA agent blackmailed into allowing a dangerous package on board a flight, starring Taron Egerton and Jason Bateman. It released December 13, 2024.

In February 2024, it was announced that Collet-Serra would direct The Woman in the Yard, produced by Jason Blum's Blumhouse Productions and starring Danielle Deadwyler. The film was released on March 28, 2025; it was originally scheduled to be released on January 10, but was removed from the release schedule in March 2024 before being rescheduled in May.

=== Upcoming projects ===
In March 2019, TheWrap reported that Collet-Serra was to direct Victory, a remake of the 1981 film Escape to Victory.

In August 2021, Collet-Serra signed on to direct a sequel to Jungle Cruise.

In October 2024, it was announced that Collet-Serra would direct a reboot of the 1993 film Cliffhanger, starring Lily James and Pierce Brosnan, with filming beginning that month in Austria. The film is expected to be released in spring 2027.

In February 2025, Collet-Serra became attached to direct the thriller Play Dead, with production expected to begin in Melbourne in May; in April 2026 the project was acquired by Netflix.

In April 2025, it was announced that Collet-Serra was set to direct a psychological thriller titled An Innocent Girl for Netflix.

Collett-Serra is also set to direct the Keanu Reeves action film Maelstrom for Netflix.

== Personal life ==
Collet-Serra resides in the Hollywood Hills West neighborhood of Los Angeles, California.

== Filmography ==
=== Film ===
Year	Title	Director	Executive producer
2005	House of Wax	Yes	No
2007	Goal II: Living the Dream	Yes	No
2009	Orphan	Yes	No
2011	Unknown	Yes	No
2014	Non-Stop	Yes	No
2015	Run All Night	Yes	Yes
2016	The Shallows	Yes	Yes
2018	The Commuter	Yes	Yes
2021	Jungle Cruise	Yes	No
2022	Black Adam	Yes	No
2024	Carry-On	Yes	Yes
2025	The Woman in the Yard	Yes	Yes
2027	Cliffhanger	Yes	No
TBA	Play Dead	Yes	No
TBA	An Innocent Girl	Yes	No

Producer

- Mindscape (2013)
- Extinction (2015)
- Curve (2015)
- Eden (2015)
- Retribution (2023)

Executive producer only

- Hooked Up (2013)
- Horizon Line (2020)

=== Television ===
Year	Title	Director	Producer	Notes
2012	The River	Yes	Yes	Episodes: "Magus" and "Marbeley"
2018	Reverie	Yes	Executive	Episode: "Apertus"
