= Goal II: Living the Dream =

2007 film by Jaume Collet-Serra

- Theatrical release poster
- Directed by: Jaume Collet-Serra
- Screenplay by: Mike Jefferies; Adrian Butchart; Terry Loane
- Story by: Mike Jefferies; Adrian Butchart
- Produced by: Mike Jefferies; Matt Barrelle; Mark Huffam
- Starring: Kuno Becker; Alessandro Nivola; Anna Friel; Stephen Dillane; Rutger Hauer
- Cinematography: Flavio Labiano
- Edited by: Niven Howie
- Music by: Stephen Warbeck
- Production company: Milkshake Films
- Distributed by: Buena Vista International (International); Kinowelt Filmverleih (Germany)
- Release date: 9 February 2007 (United Kingdom)
- Running time: 115 minutes
- Countries: United Kingdom; Spain; Germany
- Languages: English; Spanish
- Budget: $10 million
- Box office: $7.8 million

Goal II: Living the Dream (also known simply as Goal II) is a 2007 sports drama film directed by Jaume Collet-Serra from a screenplay by Mike Jefferies, Adrian Butchart, and Terry Loane. The sequel to Goal! (2005) and the second installment in the Goal! trilogy, it stars Kuno Becker, Alessandro Nivola, Anna Friel, Stephen Dillane, and Rutger Hauer. In the film, Santiago Muñez (Becker) faces difficulties as he tries to manage his sudden increased profile after moving to Real Madrid.

Goal II: Living the Dream was theatrically released in the United Kingdom by Buena Vista International on 9 February 2007. The film received mixed to negative reviews from critics, with criticism for its screenplay, which many called predictable and melodramatic; it received better reception by audiences, and is considered a cult film. Goal II: Living the Dream underperformed at the box office, grossing an estimated $7.8 million worldwide. The sequel and final installment, Goal III: Taking on the World, was released in June 2009.

== Plot ==
Santiago Muñez, the star player for Newcastle United, joins Real Madrid. His fiancée, Roz Harmison, is only able to see him intermittently, needing to stay in Newcastle to complete her nursing training. His move to Real Madrid reunites Santiago with Gavin Harris, his former teammate at Newcastle. In his debut, Gavin is substituted for Santiago, who leads Real Madrid to victory. Over the following weeks, Santiago becomes the club's star player and buys a home for him and Roz.

While travelling to a commercial shoot, Enrique, Santiago's long-lost half-brother, ambushes him with a picture of their mother, Rosa María, who walked out on Santiago as a child. While on the phone to Mercedes, his grandmother, Santiago learns Mercedes knew Rosa lived in Madrid. In the following game against Valencia, his first start for the team (replacing Gavin in the lineup), Santiago is given a red card for a tackle on Vicente Rodríguez.

In a bar after the game, Santiago is approached by sports television personality Jordana García. Santiago and Jordana get drunk and share a kiss, causing him to miss the team plane to Trondheim for a game in the UEFA Champions League against Rosenborg. Arriving alone, Santiago is disciplined by club manager Rudi Van Der Merwe by being left out the team. After the match, an angry Santiago fires Glen Foy as his agent.

Gavin moves in with Santiago after being evicted when his agent, Barry, defaults on rental payments. After playing football at home with Gavin, Santiago injures his ankle. Rudi orders Santiago begin strict injury rehabilitation, which cancels his plans to spend Christmas with Roz in Newcastle; this marks another in a stretch of recent disagreements between the couple borne out of their logistical difference. At Gavin's New Year's Eve party, Santiago and Jordana share another kiss, which is leaked to the press; Roz then calls off their relationship.

Santiago meets Enrique, who, after an argument, steals Santiago's gear bag and escapes to his parents' diner. Rosa forbids him from seeing Santiago. Meanwhile, Gavin re-establishes himself in the Real Madrid first team. At a club event, Santiago's Lamborghini is stolen by Enrique, who crashes and is badly injured. At the hospital, Santiago takes responsibility for the crash to the police; when a reporter sneaks a picture, Santiago assaults him. While being arrested, Santiago sees Rosa arrive at the hospital.

After leading Real Madrid to the Champions League final by scoring the winner against Lyon, Santiago visits Rosa. She tells him she went to Madrid when he was a child as she feared for her safety after being attacked by two men, one of which was Santiago's uncle. When Rosa returned to Mexico three weeks later, she found her family had left for the United States. (Note: As depicted at the start of Goal! (2005).) Santiago then reunites with a healed Enrique.

Prior to the final against Arsenal at the Santiago Bernabéu Stadium, Santiago asks Rudi to start Gavin ahead of him to increase Gavin's chances at securing an extension to his contract and a place in the England squad for the upcoming FIFA World Cup. Santiago also calls and apologizes to Roz. In the match, Gavin starts but concedes a penalty to Arsenal for a tackle on T.J. Harper in the first minute; Arsenal take the lead and gain control of the game.

Santiago is brought on in the second half to play alongside Gavin. Arsenal eventually go 2–0 up and are denied a bigger lead when Iker Casillas saves Arsenal's second penalty. Santiago combines with Harris, who scores to make it 2–1. In the final few minutes, Santiago scores to equalize; with a few seconds to go, David Beckham scores a direct free kick to win the Champions League.

== Cast ==
- Kuno Becker as Santiago Muñez
- Alessandro Nivola as Gavin Harris
- Anna Friel as Roz Harmison
- Stephen Dillane as Glen Foy
- Rutger Hauer as Rudi Van Der Merwe
- Frances Barber as Carol Harmison
- Míriam Colón as Mercedes Muñez
- Sean Pertwee as Barry
- Elizabeth Peña as Rosa María
- Leonor Varela as Jordana García
- Jorge Jurado as Enrique
- Nick Cannon as T.J. Harper
- David Beckham as himself

== Music ==
- "Morning Glory" - Oasis
- "Ave Maria" - Barbara Bonney
- "Bright Idea" - Orson
- "I Like the Way (You Move)" - BodyRockers
- "I See Girls (Crazy)" (Tom Neville Remix) - Studio B
- "Friday Friday" - Boy Kill Boy
- "Letting the Cables Sleep" - Bush
- "Turning Japanese" - The Vapors
- "Denial" - Stereo Black
- "No Tomorrow" - Orson
- "La Camisa Negra" - Juanes
- "Feeling a Moment" - Feeder
- "E246" - Coco & Puttnam
- "Toe the Line" - Trademark
- "Push the Button" - Sugababes
- "Here Without You" - 3 Doors Down
- "Nothing" - A
- "DESTINATION" - Year Long Disaster
- "Cógelo" - Muchachito Bombo Infierno
- "Winner" by Kazuya Yoshii is used as the theme song for the Japanese dub.

== Reception ==
On the review aggregator website Rotten Tomatoes, 39% of 18 critics' reviews are positive.

== See also ==
- List of association football films
