= Mike Jefferies =

British screenwriter and film producer

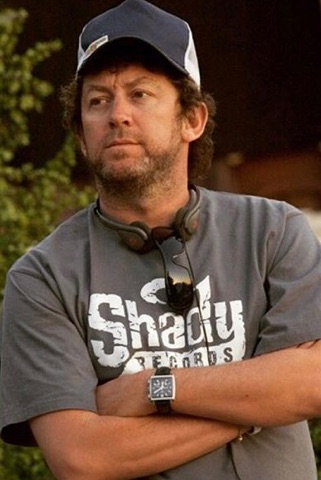
- Jefferies on set
- Born: 7 May; Liverpool, England
- Occupations: Screenwriter, Producer

Born in Liverpool, Mike Jefferies is a British screenwriter and film producer.

Jefferies founded the media and publishing group Mondiale in 1991 which he sold to the Daily Mail in 1999 after winning the Queen's Award for Enterprise in 1998.

In 2000 Jefferies moved to Los Angeles where he founded and subsequently sold the B2B media group Line 56.

In 2002 he moved into the world of feature films, beginning with soccer trilogy Goal!. Jefferies co-wrote the screenplay for the first Goal! with contributions from veteran British writers Dick Clement and Ian La Frenais. The story of a young illegal immigrant, rising from poverty to become one of the world's greatest players was released by Disney and has been shown in 38 countries worldwide. Goal! grossed $27.6m at the box office. The $50m deal that was struck between the producers and Adidas was the biggest ever between a corporate brand and a film production.

Jefferies was one of the writers on the second part of the trilogy, Goal! 2: Living the Dream....

In September 2004 Jefferies, together with Stuart Ford, fronted a bid backed by the Kraft family, to purchase Liverpool Football Club. The bid would have valued the club at approximately £200m. In 2005 the club was subsequently purchased in a deal by Tom Hicks and George Gillett which valued the club at £218.9m.

In October 2010, as part of a fans' campaign against the ownership, Jefferies conceived and directed a short film entitled 'Dear Mr Hicks' which was released virally via YouTube. The Independent newspaper praised the video saying: "True to the city's capacity to create something out of adversity, a wonderfully inventive viral film, Dear Mr Hicks, has been published online to make it clear where he ought to go. The fans' view can be summarised thus: away, and soon".

== Filmography ==
- Goal! (2005) (writer & producer)
- Goal II: Living the Dream (2007) (writer & producer)
- Goal III: Taking on the World (2009) (producer)
- Dear Mr Hicks (2010) (director & producer)
