= Mark Huffam =

British film and television producer

Mark Huffam CBE
- Born: Ballyclare, Northern Ireland, United Kingdom
- Occupations: Film and television producer
- Years active: 1997–present

Mark Huffam CBE, is a Northern Irish film and television producer. He was a producer on The Martian, Johnny English, and the television series Game of Thrones.

He was awarded CBE in 2011 at the Queen's Birthday Honours List for his services to the film and television industries. He has been a producer on several films for Ridley Scott.

== Career ==
Huffam was an associate producer and production manager on the 1998 Steven Spielberg film Saving Private Ryan. In 2011, he was a producer on the first season of the HBO series Game of Thrones.

In 2015, Huffam was a producer on the science fiction film The Martian starring Matt Damon, which Ridley Scott directed. He received an Academy Award nomination for the film for Best Picture at the 88th Academy Awards along with Simon Kinberg, Scott, and Michael Schaefer.

In 2026, Huffam completed production on The Death of Robin Hood and reaffirmed his commitment to bringing major international film productions to Ireland and Northern Ireland.

== Filmography ==
- 1997: Jumpers (Short, producer)
- 1998: Saving Private Ryan (associate producer)
- 2000: The Closer You Get (co-producer)
- 2000: Quills (co-producer)
- 2001: Captain Corelli's Mandolin (producer)
- 2002: The Hours (executive producer)
- 2003: Johnny English (producer)
- 2004: Thunderbirds (producer)
- 2004: Mickybo and Me (producer)
- 2005: Goal! The Dream Begins (producer)
- 2007: Goal II: Living the Dream (producer)
- 2008: Mamma Mia! (executive producer)
- 2008: Freakdog (producer)
- 2009: Cherrybomb (producer)
- 2009: Ghost Machine (producer)
- 2011: Killing Bono (producer)
- 2011: Your Highness (executive producer)
- 2011: Game of Thrones (TV Series, producer)
- 2011: Stand Off (executive producer)
- 2012: Prometheus (executive producer)
- 2012: Keith Lemon: The Film (producer)
- 2013: World War Z (co-producer)
- 2013: The Counselor (executive producer)
- 2014: Road (Documentary, executive producer)
- 2014: Robot Overlords (executive producer)
- 2014: Halo: Nightfall (TV Series, producer)
- 2014: Exodus: Gods and Kings (producer)
- 2015: Killing Jesus (TV Movie, producer)
- 2015: The Martian (producer)
- 2016: Morgan (producer)
- 2016: The Journey (producer)
- 2016: The Lost City of Z (executive producer)
- 2017: Alien: Covenant (producer)
- 2017: All the Money in the World (producer)
- 2020: His House (executive producer)
- 2022: The Northman (producer)
- 2023: Napoleon (producer)
