= Goal! (film) =

2005 UK sports drama film by Danny Cannon

- Theatrical release poster
- Directed by: Danny Cannon
- Screenplay by: Dick Clement; Ian La Frenais
- Story by: Mike Jefferies; Adrian Butchart
- Produced by: Mike Jefferies; Matt Barrelle; Mark Huffam
- Starring: Kuno Becker; Alessandro Nivola; Marcel Iureș; Stephen Dillane; Anna Friel
- Cinematography: Michael Barrett
- Edited by: Chris Dickens
- Music by: Graeme Revell
- Production company: Milkshake Films
- Distributed by: Buena Vista International (Note: Released under the Touchstone Pictures banner in North America.)
- Release date: 1 October 2005 (United Kingdom)
- Running time: 118 minutes
- Country: United Kingdom
- Languages: English; Spanish
- Budget: $33 million
- Box office: $27.6 million

Goal! (also known as Goal! The Dream Begins) is a 2005 British sports drama film directed by Danny Cannon from a screenplay by Mike Jefferies, Adrian Butchart, Dick Clement, and Ian La Frenais. It is the first installment in the Goal! trilogy and stars Kuno Becker, Alessandro Nivola, Marcel Iureș, Stephen Dillane, and Anna Friel. In the film, Santiago Muñez (Becker), an amateur player, earns an unlikely chance to play professional football.

Goal! was made with co-operation from FIFA, which enabled the inclusion of FIFPro likenesses of real teams and players. Adidas contributed a reported $50 million towards the film's budget and marketing campaign, marking the then-biggest deal between a corporate brand and a film production.

Goal! was theatrically released in the United Kingdom by Buena Vista International on 1 October 2005. The film received mixed reviews from critics, with praise for the sports sequences and Becker's performance but criticism for the screenplay, with many labelling it cliché. Goal! underperformed at the box office, grossing $27.6 million worldwide. The sequel, Goal II: Living the Dream, was released in the United Kingdom in February 2007.

== Plot ==
Santiago Muñez, a Mexican undocumented immigrant living in Los Angeles, is a skilled footballer who plays for his local team and works as a gardener with his father, Hernan, and as a busboy in a Chinese restaurant. During one of his matches, Santiago is approached by Glen Foy, a former player and scout for Newcastle United, who helps arrange a trial with the club. To afford travel to England, Santiago saves his earnings, which Hernan steals to buy a truck for the business, being dismissive of Santiago's chances at becoming a professional. Santiago's grandmother, Mercedes, secretly hands him money and urges him to depart for England before Hernan can find out.

Arriving in Newcastle, Santiago stays with Glen and begins his trial. In muddy conditions, Santiago struggles under pressure from Hughie McGowan, a teammate, during a training match. Although unimpressed, Erik Dornhelm, the club's manager, acquiesces to Glen's request that Santiago's trial last for a month. During a medical, Santiago lies about his asthma to club nurse, Roz Harmison, fearing it will damage his chances of being signed; he is then given a one-month contract.

Despite facing some bullying by Hughie, Santiago becomes friends with Jamie Drew, another player on trial. Santiago soon adapts to English conditions and a reserve match is scheduled at the end of his trial to determine his signing on a full-time basis. Before the match, Santiago tries to use his inhaler but Hughie destroys it, leading to an asthma flare-up. After another disappointing performance, Newcastle let Santiago go.

On his way to the airport, Santiago's taxi picks up Gavin Harris, an indisciplined, struggling yet talented player who recently joined Newcastle. Gavin, late for training, finds out about Santiago's asthma, and informs Erik. Erik lets Santiago stay, contingent on him seeking treatment for his asthma. Santiago then moves in with Gavin and they form a friendship. After impressive performances in the reserves, Santiago makes his debut for the first team, coming on as a substitute against Fulham. Santiago earns a penalty, which helps them win the match, a moment proudly seen on TV by Hernan.

Despite the victory, Erik criticizes Santiago's selfishness on the pitch, urging him to pass the ball more. That night, he and Gavin go out partying and their drunken picture winds up in The Sun, enraging Erik. Jamie suffers a career-ending injury as Santiago and Gavin's friendship starts to crumble. Hernan suffers a sudden fatal heart attack, and Santiago prepares to return home. However, at the airport, Santiago abandons his flight, instead training until the early hours at St James' Park after a conversation with Roz, with whom Santiago begins a relationship. Erik then informs Santiago he has been selected to start the season's final game against Liverpool, who are due to play in the 2005 UEFA Champions League final against AC Milan 10 days after the game.

On match day, Newcastle score early but Liverpool soon took the lead. In the final minutes of injury time, Santiago assists Gavin for the equalizer, however, a draw will not be enough to earn Newcastle a place in the UEFA Champions League. Minutes before the end of the game, Newcastle earns a free kick, which Gavin hands to Santiago, who scores and Newcastle wins 3–2 to secure a berth in next season's UEFA Champions League. After the match, Glen relays a call to Santiago from Mercedes, informing Santiago his father watched his match against Fulham.

== Cast ==
- Kuno Becker as Santiago Muñez
- Alessandro Nivola as Gavin Harris
- Stephen Dillane as Glen Foy
- Anna Friel as Roz Harmison
- Marcel Iureș as Erik Dornhelm
- Sean Pertwee as Barry Rankin
- Cassandra Bell as Christina
- Kieron Dyer as himself
- Gary Lewis as Mal Braithwaite
- Míriam Colón as Mercedes Muñez
- Tony Plana as Hernán Muñez
- Lee Ross as Bluto
- Kieran O'Brien as Hughie McGowan
- Ashley Walters as Carl Francis
- Frances Barber as Carol Harmison
- Kevin Knapman as Jamie Drew
- Alan Shearer as himself
- Zinedine Zidane as himself

== Production ==
The film was the first of a planned trilogy. Originally the lead role was supposed to be played by Diego Luna but he left to pursue other projects and was replaced by Kuno Becker. Michael Winterbottom was also slated to direct the film but after creative differences he was replaced by Danny Cannon. Shooting for the film commenced in January 2005 and locations included Pinewood Studios, London, Newcastle, and Los Angeles.

== Soundtrack ==
Goal!: Music from the Motion Picture

Soundtrack album by various artists
- Released: 3 October 2005
- Label: Big Brother (UK)

The musical score for Goal! was composed by Graeme Revell, who previously collaborated with director Danny Cannon on Phoenix (1998).

A soundtrack album was released on Oasis' Big Brother Recordings label in 2005 and contains three Oasis songs unavailable elsewhere, including the exclusive Noel Gallagher song "Who Put the Weight of the World on My Shoulders?" The soundtrack also contains a re-recorded version of Oasis' "Cast No Shadow" with Gallagher on vocals and produced by Unkle. Dave Sardy, a producer of two Oasis albums, contributed a remix of their song "Morning Glory" for inclusion on the soundtrack.

The soundtrack also marked the full return of alternative rock group Happy Mondays with their song "Playground Superstar". A music video for the song was made to promote the soundtrack.

1. "Playground Superstar" – Happy Mondays (exclusive track)
2. "Who Put the Weight of the World on My Shoulders?" – Oasis (exclusive track)
3. "Leap of Faith" – Unkle featuring Joel Cadbury (exclusive track)
4. "Human Love" – Dirty Vegas
5. "Morning Glory" (Dave Sardy Mix) – Oasis (exclusive track)
6. "This Is the Land" – The Bees
7. "Cast No Shadow" (Unkle Beachhead Mix) – Oasis (exclusive track)
8. Score: "That's That" – Graeme Revell
9. "Club Foot" – Kasabian
10. "Look Up" – Zero 7
11. "Wet! Wet! Wet!" – Princess Superstar
12. "Blackout" – Unkle
13. "Will You Smile Again for Me" – ...And You Will Know Us by the Trail of Dead
14. Score: "Premiership Medley" – Graeme Revell

== Reception ==
On the review aggregation website Rotten Tomatoes, the film has an approval rating of 42% based on 83 reviews, with an average score of 5.20/10. The website's critics' consensus reads: "Impressive sports action sequences are the highlight, as the run-of the-mill story invokes every known sports movie cliché". On Metacritic, the film has a weighted average score of 53 out of 100 based on reviews from 19 critics, indicating "mixed or average reviews". Audiences polled by CinemaScore gave the film an average grade of "A" on an A+ to F scale.

Roger Ebert praised the film, awarding it three stars out of four and calling it "surprisingly effective". He went on to say: "I was surprised, then, to find myself enjoying the movie almost from the beginning. It had some of the human reality of Gregory Nava's work". Ebert singled out Kuno Becker's lead performance in the film and praised it, saying, "the starring performance by Becker is convincing and dimensional and we begin to care for him. A Mexican star of films and TV and three English-language films little released in America has not only star quality but something more rare; likability".

Variety.com called it "a slickly mounted slice of can-do nonsense"; BBC Film labelled it a "fantasy"; and UEFA Perspective called it brilliant. The film scored moderately at the box office, making $27.6 million in cinemas, but by the time it reached DVD, huge sales made it the gold standard for sports films in the UK, many European territories and South America. In 2018, SPORTbible voted Goal! the "Greatest Football Film of All Time".

In 2021, Newcastle signed a Mexican-American striker named Santiago Muñoz, noting the remarkable similarity to the film.

== See also ==
- List of association football films
