= Kuno Becker =

Mexican actor (born 1978)

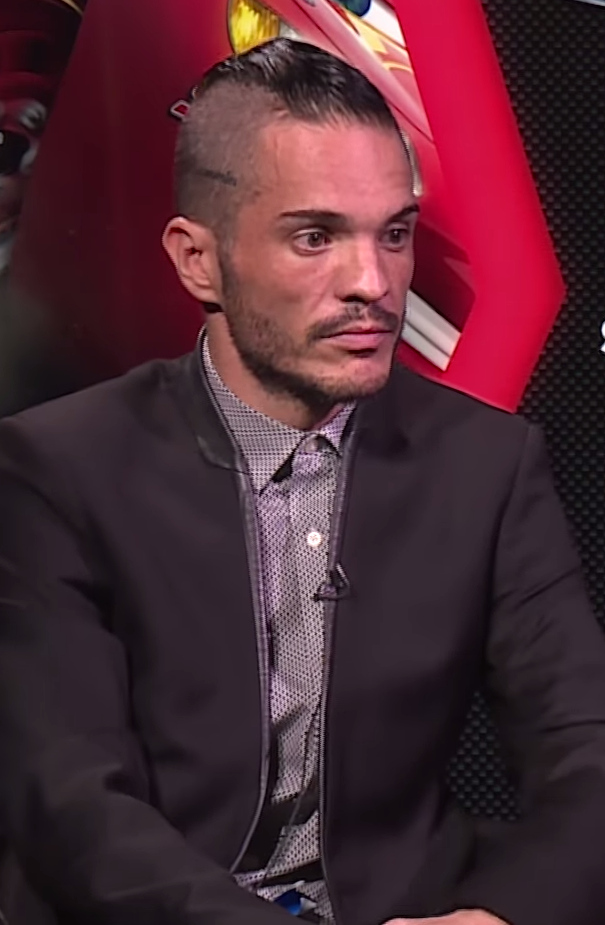
- Becker in 2017
- Born: Eduardo Kuno Becker Paz; January 14, 1978 (age 48); Mexico City, Mexico
- Occupations: Actor, film director
- Years active: 1996–present
- Children: 1

Eduardo Kuno Becker Paz (born January 14, 1978), professionally known as Kuno Becker, is a Mexican actor and film director who has appeared in telenovelas, Mexican and American films. He is perhaps best known for his roles as Rubén Barraisabal in Soñadoras and Santiago Muñez in the Goal! film series.

He also portrayed Drew Ramos on the American series Dallas.

== Early years ==
After earning a scholarship, Becker traveled to Europe and studied at the Mozarteum in Salzburg, Austria, where he took violin lessons under Ruggiero Ricci.

He is a grandnephew of Mexican actress María Félix.

== Career ==
At age seventeen, Becker was accepted into the Centro de Educación Artística (CEA) of Televisa.

By age nineteen, after two years of drama training, he secured his first television role in the telenovela Para toda la vida (1996). Subsequent early TV appearances included Pueblo chico, infierno grande, El alma no tiene color, Desencuentro, Rencor Apasionado, and Soñadoras, his first leading role.

In film, Becker appeared in La Primera Noche (1997). In 2002, he starred in La Hija del Caníbal alongside Cecilia Roth. He later appeared with Antonio Banderas and Emma Thompson in Imagining Argentina. Becker also starred in the historical epic Nomad (2006). In 2005, he appeared in ESL: English as a Second Language, then went on to central roles in the *Goal!* series (2005, 2007) and a cameo in Goal III: Taking on the World (2009). He also provided the Latin American Spanish voice of Lightning McQueen in the Cars franchise.

His more recent film credits include El día de la unión, *Ánima*, *108 Costuras*, *Spoken Word*, *La Última Muerte*, *Cabeza de Buda*, and *Panic 5 Bravo*.

Becker co-wrote the screenplay for *Espacio Interior*, based on the 1985 Mexico City earthquake. He also played Esteban Navarro, a recurring antagonist, in Season 10 of CSI: Miami.

== Filmography ==
=== Film ===
Year	Film	Role
1998	La Primera Noche	Chico golpeado
2003	La Hija del Caníbal	Adrián
2003	Imagining Argentina	Gustavo Santos
2005	Goal!	Santiago Muñez
2005	English as a Second Language	Bolívar De La Cruz
2007	Nomad	Mansur
2007	Sex and Breakfast	Ellis
2007	Goal II: Living the Dream	Santiago Muñez
2009	Goal III: Taking on the World	Santiago Muñez
2009	Spoken Word	Cruz
2009	Cabeza de Buda	Thomas Turrent
2009	From Mexico with Love	Héctor Villa
2010	La Última Muerte	Christian
2010	Te Presento a Laura	Sebastián
2010	Espacio Interior	Lázaro
2011	From Prada to Nada	Rodrigo
2012	El Cartel de los Sapos	Damián
2012	Las paredes hablan	Javier
2013	Cinco de Mayo: La Batalla	Ignacio Zaragoza
2013	Panic 5 Bravo	Alex
2018	El Día de la Unión	Max

=== Television ===
Year	Series	Role	Notes
1996	Te sigo amando	Humberto	
1996	Para toda la vida	Eduardo Valdemoros	
1997	Desencuentro	David Rivera Quintana	
1997	El Alma no Tiene Color	Juan José	
1997	Pueblo chico, infierno grande	Hermilo Jaimez	
1997–1998	Mujer, casos de la vida real	Roberto / Rubén	
1998	Soñadoras	Rubén Barraisabal	
1998	Camila	Julio Galindo	
1998	Rencor Apasionado	Pablo Gallardo del Campo	
1999–2000	Mujeres engañadas	César Martínez	
2000	Locura de amor	León Baldomero (cameo)	
2000–2001	Primer amor... a mil por hora	León Baldomero	
2010	House	Ramón Silva	
2010	The Defenders	Alex Velasco	
2011–2012	CSI: Miami	Esteban Navarro	
2012	Dallas	Drew Ramos Jr.	
2014	Hasta el fin del mundo	Samuel	(2 episodes)
2021	Fuego ardiente	Joaquín Ferrer	
2022	Mi secreto	Young Alfonso Ugarte	(2 episodes)
2023	Dra. Lucía, un don extraordinario	Enrique Jiménez	

=== Theater ===
Year	Play
2007	The Pillowman
1999	En Roma el Amor es Broma
1998	Culpas Prohibidas

== Awards ==
- 2000 TVyNovelas Award – Best Young Lead Actor for *Mujeres engañadas*
- 2000 TVyNovelas Award – Best Male Revelation for *Mujeres engañadas*
- 2018 Ariel Awards
