= POYKPAC =

Brooklyn-based comedy troupe (2006–2015)

YouTube information
- Channel: POYKPAC
- Years active: 2006–2015
- Genres: Sketch comedy; parody; satire; character comedy
- Subscribers: 71.10 thousand
- Views: 89.91 million
- Last updated: March 8, 2026
- Website: poykpac.com (archived)

POYKPAC (Note: POYKPAC is an acronym for Pictures of Your Kids Pooping and Crying.) was a comedy troupe based in Brooklyn, New York City that consisted of Jenn Lyon, Taige Jensen, Ryan Hunter, Ryan Hall, and Maggie Ross. Its YouTube channel has over 71,000 subscribers and more than 88 million views. They are most well known for their YouTube videos Hipster Olympics and Mario: Game Over, the latter of which being a parody of Super Mario Bros.

== History and reception ==
Mario: Game Over is the troupe's most-viewed comedy video.

POYKPAC was formed in January 2006. The troupe joined YouTube on April 9, 2006, and it uploaded its first video in June 2006. Before creating the channel, Jenn Lyon, Ryan Hunter, and Maggie Ross were students at the University of North Carolina School of the Arts; they later met Taige Jensen and Ryan Hall when moving to New York City, where they formed POYKPAC. The troupe was based in Bushwick, Brooklyn, where they lived in proximity to acquaintances Waverly Films. In May 2007, POYKPAC uploaded Mario: Game Over, which as of November 2022 has 63.2 million views. Bilge Ebiri of the magazine New York described the video as an "unholy cross between Raging Bull and Spun" and that it "transcends its sketch-comedy origins and gains a kind of rough epic grandeur". The video was nominated for the Best Comedy Video of 2007 in the YouTube Awards, although it did not win the award. POYKPAC took part in the Sketchies contest, which was organized by YouTube, in June 2007.

The troupe uploaded Hipster Olympics to its channel in August 2007, which as of November 2022 has 3.7 million views. POYKPAC stated that the video was inspired from Monty Python's Upper Class Twit of the Year sketch. Block Magazine, a Brooklyn-based local news magazine, noted that the video shows "is not just a pithy stab at self-caricatures", while PopMatters described the cast as "an overall level of nonchalance and a reticent air of superiority". New York noted that the video was "hugely important in the evolution of the hipster joke because it brought the concept of making fun of hipsters to the internet", while Jen Carlson of Gothamist described it as "somehow still funny even though making fun of hipsters isn't even ironically cool anymore". The troupe took part in the second Sketchies contest in April 2008, nominating the Voice Talkers video for the final round; they placed second. POYKPAC launched Good Morning Internet!, a 15-episode web-series, in June 2008, which aired on the Independent Film Channel (IFC). Based on the Canadian Good Morning World television series, it was a morning talk show that included parody and character comedy; it ran for three weeks. Actor and filmmaker Michael Swaim described the series as their "crown jewel". Comedian Reggie Watts and YouTube personality Caitlin Hill made guest appearances in the show.

In October 2011, POYKPAC uploaded The Walken Dead to its YouTube channel, which as of November 2022 has 1.3 million views. It is a parody that combines The Walking Dead and actors making impressions of Christopher Walken. In 2012, POYKPAC won the Syfy reality series Viral Video Showdown. The troupe uploaded Movie Title Breakup to its channel in February 2014, which as of November 2022 has 1.1 million views. According to Hunter, who directed the video, the video was recorded a year and a half ago before its upload date. In the short film, the couple, portrayed by Hunter and Lyon, break up only using film titles. Gizmodo described it as "supremely clever short", while HuffPost described it as a "funny and innovative sketch". At this point, the troupe operated on an "on-off basis", since the members were also a part of other projects. POYKPAC uploaded its last video in April 2015, although the troupe released a sequel of the Movie Title Breakup video in December 2015 on The Fine Bros YouTube channel.

Alongside IFC, the content that POYKPAC published was also featured on MTV and on the Today news show.

== Members ==
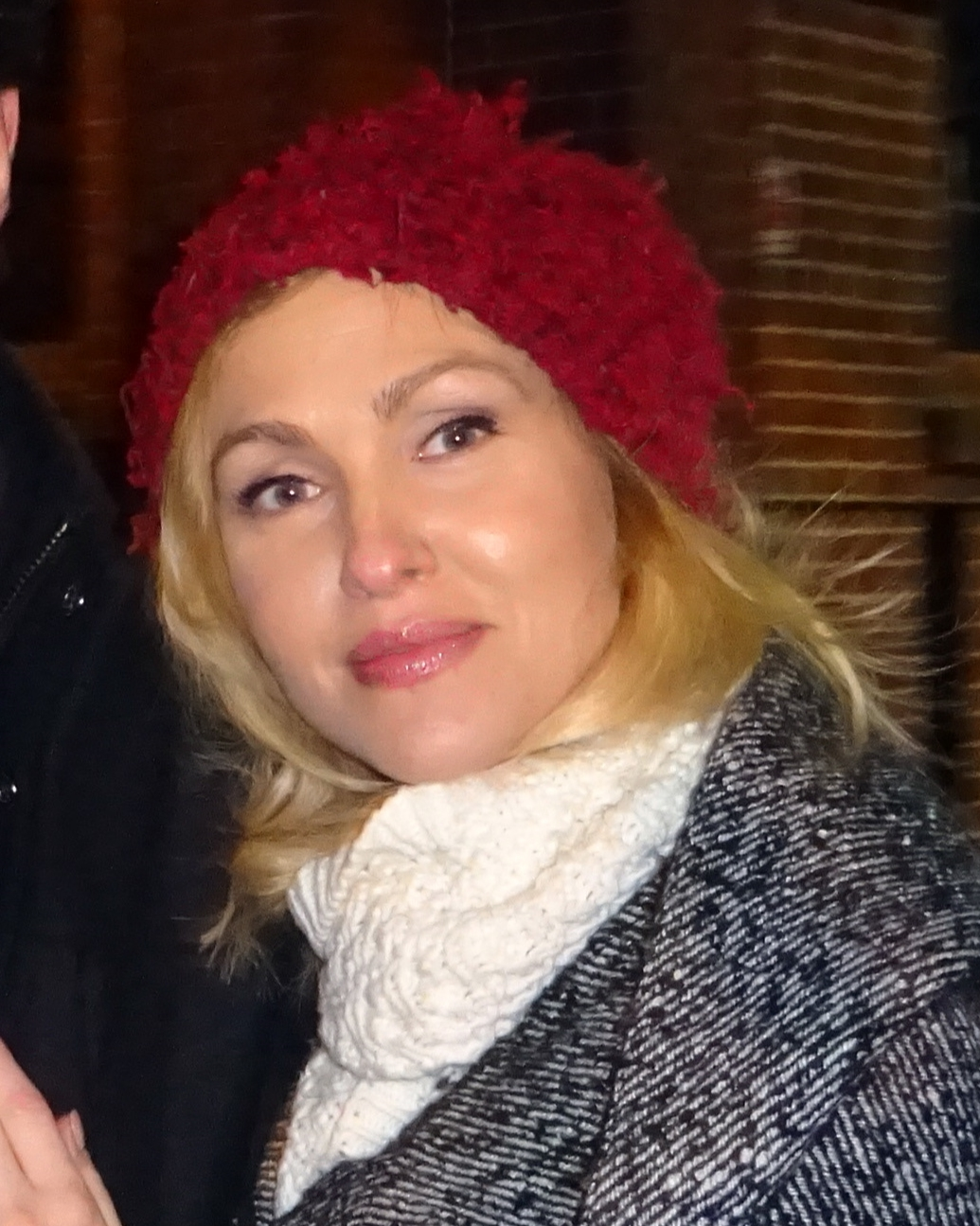
Lyon wrote and produced the troupe's videos.

POYKPAC was composed of Jenn Lyon, Taige Jensen, Ryan Hunter, Ryan Hall, and Maggie Ross. They also served as the cast in their Good Morning Internet! web-series in 2008. Additionally, Will Connell, Johnny Gillette, Dave Powell, and Paul Whitty were also associated with POYKPAC. The troupe was partnered with the Above Average Productions. POYKPAC also operated a video response channel, PoykpacLIVE, and a collaborative channel, geniuscamp.

Together with Hunter, Jensen published a humor book named Coloring for Grown-Ups in 2012. It was recommended by The New York Times, while Book Riot described it as "darkly humorous and fun". They also together ran a blog to promote the book.

=== Jenn Lyon ===
Lyon was one of the founding members of POYKPAC, and she served as one of the writers and producers. She also operated her personal YouTube channel until 2012. After graduating from the School of the Arts in 2003, she moved to Queens and later to Brooklyn, to live with rest of the members. While still a member of POYKPAC, she made guest appearances in Army Wives, Louie, and Suburgatory and also cast in Justified and Saint George. She also starred in the Fish in the Dark, a play that premiered on Broadway in 2015. After the retirement of POYKPAC, she was cast as Jennifer Husser in the comedy-drama series Claws and as Cinnamon in Blaze. She married fellow troupe member Taige Jensen in 2019.

=== Taige Jensen ===
Jensen served as the troupe's editor. Apart from POYKPAC, he worked as a director and writer for online magazine Slate; his Political Kombat '12 series was nominated for an Emmy in 2013. He later documented videos and worked as a video editor for The New York Times; he also worked on two videos for The New York Times with Lyon. In 2017, The Forger, a short film that he edited for The New York Times, received an Emmy.

=== Ryan Hunter ===
Hunter was previously a contributor for HuffPost. He appeared in the film The New Year opposite Trieste Kelly Dunn.
