= Tobit =

Tobit may refer to

- The Book of Tobit, a book of scripture that is part of the Catholic and Orthodox biblical canon, or its principal character
- Tobit model, an econometric model for censored endogenous variables proposed by James Tobin
- Tobit Raphael, American actor
- Tobi Brown, known as TBJZL (born 1993), English YouTuber

== See also ==
- Tobitt
