= Stumble (TV series) =

2025 American mockumentary sitcom

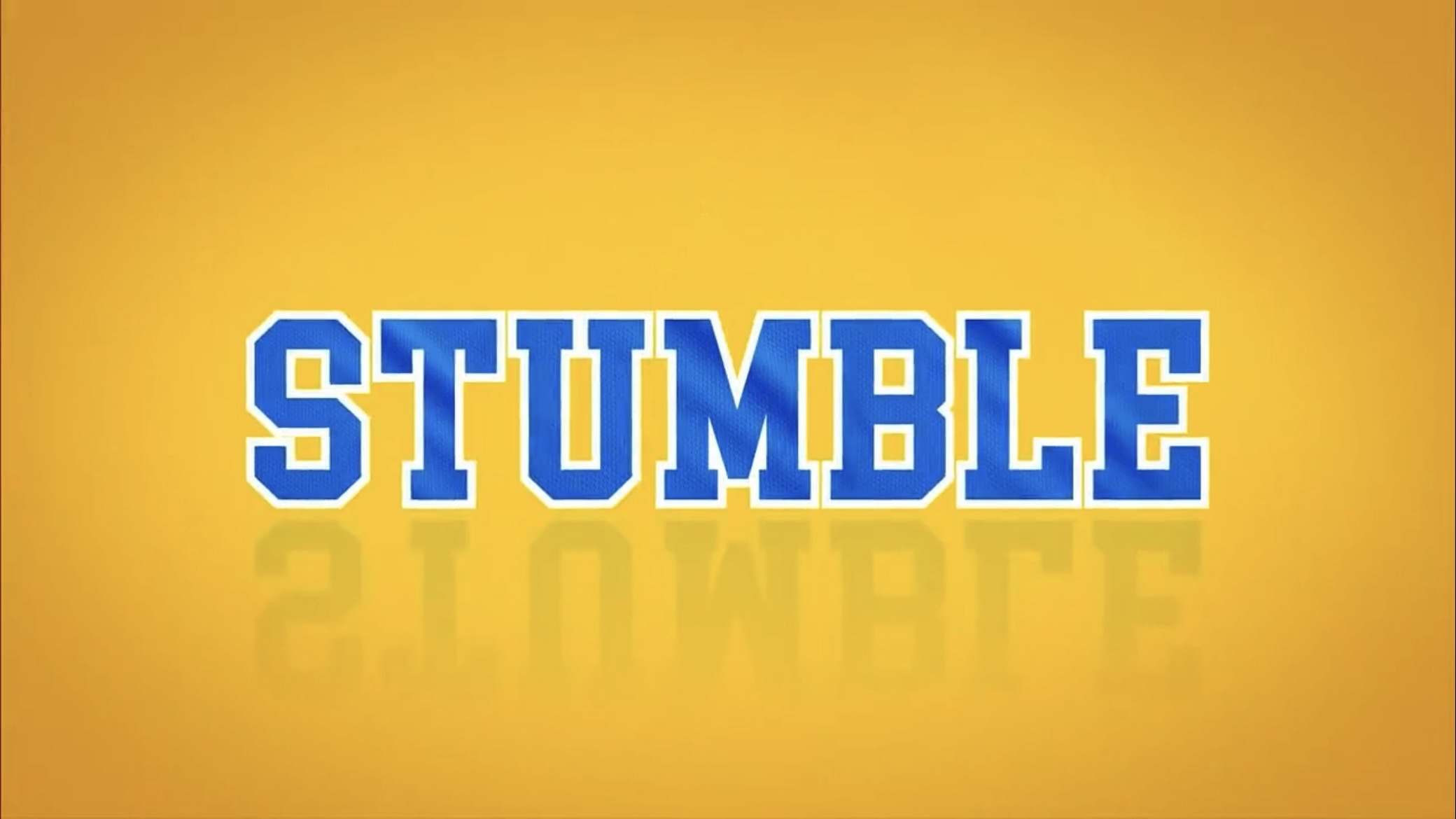
- Genre: Mockumentary sitcom
- Created by: Jeff Astrof & Liz Astrof
- Starring: Jenn Lyon; Taran Killam; Anissa Borrego; Jarrett Austin Brown; Arianna Davis; Taylor Dunbar; Georgie Murphy; Ryan Pinkston
- Music by: Tim Phillips
- Country of origin: United States
- Original language: English
- No. of seasons: 1
- No. of episodes: 13

Production
- Executive producers: Jeff Astrof; Liz Astrof; Dana Honor; Monica Aldama; Jeffrey Blitz
- Producers: Kristin Davis; Steven Ast; Jenn Lyon
- Cinematography: Jay Hunter; Jeff Waldron
- Editors: Julie Bowen; Christian Kinnard; Antonia de Barros; Jonathan Pledger; Ryan Neatha Johnson; Liza Cardinale
- Running time: 22 minutes
- Production companies: Other Shoe Productions (episodes 2-13); Candy Button Suppository (episode 11); Mama Look! Productions; Defining Eve Productions; Universal Television

Original release
- Network: NBC
- Release: November 7, 2025 – March 13, 2026

Stumble is an American mockumentary sitcom created by Jeff Astrof and Liz Astrof. Jenn Lyon stars as a successful competitive cheerleading coach trying to train a new squad of inexperienced students at Heådltston State Junior College after being fired from her former job. The series premiered on NBC on November 7, 2025. In May 2026, the series was canceled after one season.

== Plot ==
Set in the fictional cities of Wichita Flats, Texas, and Heådltston, Oklahoma, the competitive cheerleading coach tied for winningest cheer champion, Courteney Potter (Jenn Lyon), is fired from her position after drinking with her squad. She finds a new job as the typing instructor and head coach of the squad at Heådltston State Junior College and pulls together a team in hopes of winning the championship.

== Cast ==
=== Main ===
- Jenn Lyon as Courteney Potter, a plucky cheerleading coach seeking to break the record for winningest cheer champion coach
- Taran Killam as Jackie Potter, Courteney's husband and head coach of the football team at Sammy Davis Sr. Junior College
- Anissa Borrego as Krystal, the former flyer at Sammy Davis Sr. and new flyer at Heådltston
- Jarrett Austin Brown as Dimarcus, a former Sammy Davis Sr. Junior College football player and a new cheerleader at Heådltston
- Arianna Davis as Madonna, a talented new Heådltston cheerleader with narcolepsy
- Taylor Dunbar as Peaches, a kleptomaniac and new Heådltston cheerleader
- Georgie Murphy as Sally, an always-happy cheerleader whose life story is exceedingly grim
- Ryan Pinkston as Steven Vaughn, a thirty-something car rental clerk that due to never having graduated can still serve as a cheerleader at Heådltston

=== Recurring ===
- Kristin Chenoweth as Tammy Istiny, former assistant coach to Courteney and new head cheerleading coach at Sammy Davis Sr. Junior College
- Ashlie Atkinson as Miss Dot, the facilities manager at Heådltston
- Sean Kaufman as Holden, Sally's love interest

=== Notable guest stars ===
- Jeff Hiller as Augustus ẞlimpfh, the eccentric and "crazy" owner of a candy button factory
- Busy Philipps as Vicky, Peaches' older sister
- Annaleigh Ashford as Jolene Tittel, a high-powered "AI lady" and business executive
- Katey Sagal as Marg Hargberg, Courteney’s former coach who influenced the way she has taught cheerleading

== Episodes ==
No.	Title	Directed by	Written by	Original release date	U.S. viewers (millions)
1	"Pilot"	Jeffrey Blitz	Jeff Astrof & Liz Astrof	November 7, 2025	2.02
After getting fired from her position at Sammy Davis Sr. Junior College, Courteney Potter lands a job coaching a new cheer squad at Heådltston. After recruiting ten cheerleaders, the Buttons put on a "Show Off" performance in an attempt to attend a national conference. Krystal, a popular cheerleader, falls and breaks her ankle disqualifying the team from advancing with the "Show Off" performance.
2	"Media Day"	Jeffrey Blitz	Jeff Astrof	November 14, 2025	1.70
After Krystal’s fall, Courteney decides to use media day as a way to recruit new cheerleaders and put the team on the mat. DiMarcus proves it difficult to adapt to being a part of a team.
3	"In Sync"	Jeffrey Blitz	Liz Astrof	November 21, 2025	1.76
Several female Button members begin their menstrual cycles simultaneously. Sally, who is experiencing homelessness, is overlooked by a flustered Courteney, who is concerned about the possibility of pregnancy after not starting her cycle. Meanwhile, despite persistent teasing from football players, Dimarcus assists the group by providing tampons and small gifts.
4	"Button Day"	Yana Gorskaya	Niki Schwartz-Wright	December 5, 2025	N/A
With the gym falling apart, Coach Potter is desperate to find funds to fix it and is directed to the school's benefactor, the candy button factory owner. He promises to write a giant check if the squad has some real flyers, but with Krystal still injured, Coach is forced to figure out how to make Peaches step up.
5	"Homecoming"	Yana Gorskaya	Matthew Zinman & Craig Gerard	December 12, 2025	N/A
Homecoming was Coach Potter's favorite time at SDSJC, but Heådltston doesn't even play a home game (the Button Day celebrations leave the air toxic for some time). Hoping to instill some school spirit, she throws a pep rally, but then their away game is cancelled. Instead, she returns to Sammy Davis, Sr. Junior College for their homecoming game against Heådltston. But when she and Dimarcus don't receive the warm welcomes they expect, the cheering takes a turn.
6	"The Tell-Tale Slurp"	Jeffrey Blitz	Maxwell Theodore Vivian	December 19, 2025	N/A
Coach Potter, overwhelmed by her many responsibilities, decides to try and ask her old assistant Coach Istiny to be her assistant again. But Coach Istiny has gotten a 5-year contract as head coach with SDSJC. Which leaves Coach Potter with her only option -- Steven. As expected, it does not go well. At all. But at least Coach Potter finally finds out who sent the video that got her fired.
7	"Lorraine"	Jeffrey Blitz	Andy Blitz	January 16, 2026	N/A
The betrayal and the stress of getting to Daytona unleash Coach Potter's angrier, tougher, meaner alter ego Lorraine. And Lorraine gets down to business, hiring the best choreographer in cheer at great personal expense. But the limited time she has with him is interrupted by the mandatory HR training that Steven's proposal (and explicit confessions to the school) triggered. It pushes Lorraine over the edge -- but that snap gets Coach Potter to come back to herself, and figure out a creative way to get her Buttons the choreography they need.
8	"God Bless Heådltston"	Yana Gorskaya	Mattie Bayne	January 23, 2026	N/A
Right as the Buttons are getting into a groove, the community center is closed because it contains massive amounts of asbestos, leaving the Buttons' gym to fill in the gaps. Desperate for money to fix the center to get her space back, Coach Potter tries to convince the town to put in a bid for a new data center. With some help from Boone, the town agrees -- and puts on a talent show to demonstrate all that Heådltston has to offer. Not thinking it will be enough, Coach Potter tries to personally convince the executive and has to pull off a cheer miracle to make it happen.
9	"Lights Out"	Yana Gorskaya	Shawn Parikh	January 30, 2026	N/A
Heådltston wins the bid for the AI data center! And it immediately sucks the town dry of water and electricity, cancelling school. Coach Potter falls into a depressive slump as she struggles to keep her team invested and together, but they end up surprising her.
10	"Finals Week"	Jeffrey Blitz	Craig Gerard & Matthew Zinman	February 20, 2026	N/A
The final day for video submission for Daytona consideration happens to be right at the end of Heådltston's finals week. Coach Potter has to get everyone to pass their finals (including the one she's giving in typing) and make sure they have enough time on the mat to film every one of the qualifying skills. In an effort to achieve both, she makes Peaches Krystal's tutor, and their pairing ends up getting the team over the line.
11	"Hildebünch"	Jeffrey Blitz	Niki Schwartz-Wright	February 27, 2026	N/A
The Buttons are going to Daytona! But first they need to raise $19,000 to get there. The Squad’s creativity get’s them part of the way there before Heådlston’s car wash mafia gets involved, so after desperately trying to find any money left of her own, Coach Potter pleads with the wealthiest resident Augustus ẞlimpfh for funds once more. This time, he agrees — if Courtney will take on his daughter, Hildenbünch.
12	"Making Mat"	Yana Gorskaya	Jeff Astrof & Liz Astrof	March 6, 2026	N/A
Her new member recruitment having gone too well, Coach Potter is faced with having to cut the team down to the final Daytona performers. With the help of her choreographer/stalker, she runs making mat tryouts, trying to put her head over her heart — even as Boon makes impassioned cheer dad threats on behalf of Sally, and OG Button Madonna gets the Yips.
13	"Daytona"	Yana Gorskaya	Liz Astrof & Jeff Astrof	March 13, 2026	N/A
The Buttons experience the cheerleading championships, competing on cheer's biggest stage. They first must overcome not only Sammy Davis Senior Jr. College, but a surprising foe from Courteney's past.

== Production ==
NBC picked up the Stumble pilot in March 2025. The series is created by siblings Jeff Astrof and Liz Astrof, with executive producer Monica Aldama, a former cheerleading coach that also appeared in the Netflix docuseries Cheer. It was ordered to series on July 22, 2025, with the following main cast members announced: Jenn Lyon, Taran Killam, Ryan Pinkston, Jarrett Austin Brown, Anissa Borrego, Arianna Davis, Taylor Dunbar and Georgie Murphy. Kristin Chenoweth was announced as a recurring cast member.

Stumble premiered on NBC on November 7, 2025. New episodes are available to stream on Peacock the day after release on NBC. On May 1, 2026, Stumble was canceled after one season.

== Reception ==
=== Critical response ===
The series received mainly positive reception. On the review aggregator website Rotten Tomatoes, 82% of 11 critics' reviews are positive. The website's critics consensus reads, "Stumble gives heart, humor, and a cast to cheer for in a wonderful new docu-style sports comedy that might sometimes flail, but surely sticks the landing." Metacritic, which uses a weighted average, gave a score of 70 out of 100 based on 7 critics, indicating "generally favorable".

Aramide Tinubu wrote for Variety, "With a highly talented cast who clearly know their characters and exceptional comedic timing, the show hits the ground running, and it can only reach new heights from here." Cristina Escobar of RogerEbert.com praised the cast, "It's a strong setup and approach, buoyed by a cast that's clearly having fun with it. Lyon and Killam are both heartfelt and funny, able to pull laughs and play their more down-to-earth moments." In a less positive review, Angie Han of The Hollywood Reporter described Stumble as "too harmless to hate — it is just, like most of its characters, too sloppy to put much faith in so far."

=== Ratings ===
Viewership and ratings per episode of Stumble
No.	Title	Air date	Rating/share (18–49)	Viewers (millions)	DVR (18–49)	DVR viewers (millions)	Total (18–49)	Total viewers (millions)	Ref.
1	"Pilot"	November 7, 2025	0.2/3	2.02	0.04	0.42	0.22	2.44	
2	"Media Day"	November 14, 2025	0.2/3	1.70	TBD	TBD	TBD	TBD	
3	"In Sync"	November 21, 2025	0.2/3	1.76	TBD	TBD	TBD	TBD	
