= The Internship =

2013 film by Shawn Levy

- Theatrical release poster
- Directed by: Shawn Levy
- Screenplay by: Vince Vaughn; Jared Stern
- Story by: Vince Vaughn
- Produced by: Vince Vaughn; Shawn Levy
- Starring: Vince Vaughn; Owen Wilson; Rose Byrne; Max Minghella
- Cinematography: Jonathan Brown
- Edited by: Dean Zimmerman
- Music by: Christophe Beck
- Production companies: Regency Enterprises; 21 Laps Entertainment; Wild West Picture Show Productions
- Distributed by: 20th Century Fox
- Release date: June 7, 2013
- Running time: 119 minutes
- Country: United States
- Language: English
- Budget: $58 million
- Box office: $93.5 million

The Internship is a 2013 American comedy film directed by Shawn Levy, written by Vince Vaughn and Jared Stern, and produced by Vaughn and Levy. The film stars Vaughn and Owen Wilson as recently laid-off salesmen who attempt to compete with much younger and more technically skilled applicants for a job at Google. Rose Byrne, Max Minghella, Aasif Mandvi, Josh Brener, Dylan O'Brien, Tobit Raphael, Tiya Sircar, Josh Gad, and Jessica Szohr also star.

The Internship was the second film with Vaughn and Wilson in the lead roles, after the 2005 film Wedding Crashers; the two had appeared in the 2004 film Starsky & Hutch. This was the second collaboration of Levy, Vaughn, and Stern after the 2012 film The Watch, and the third of Levy and Wilson after the first two Night at the Museum films.

Released by 20th Century Fox on June 7, 2013, the film received mixed reviews from critics and grossed $93.5 million worldwide against a $58 million budget.

== Plot ==
After salesmen Billy McMahon and Nick Campbell's employer goes out of business, Billy applies for Google internships for them both. They are accepted due to their unorthodox interview answers, despite a lack of relevant experience and not being of traditional collegiate age.

They will spend the summer competing in teams against other interns in a variety of tasks, with only members of the winning team guaranteed jobs with Google. Billy and Nick's team is led by Lyle, a manager at Google who constantly tries to act hip to hide his insecurities, and its other members are seen as rejects: the smartphone-addicted Stuart, the tiger-parented Filipino Yo-Yo, and Indian American nerd-related kink enthusiast Neha.

Although Stuart, Yo-Yo, and Neha find Billy and Nick useless in the initial tasks, Billy rallies the team in a comeback that unifies them in a game of quidditch. However, the team loses after an intern of the opposing team, Graham, cheats.

When teams are tasked with developing an app, Billy and Nick persuade their teammates to spend a wild night out at a strip club. Lyle's drunken antics inspire them to create an app that guards against reckless phone usage while intoxicated and wins the challenge with the most downloads.

Meanwhile, Nick has been flirting with a Google executive Dana with little success. When he begins attending technical presentations to impress her, he develops an interest in the material. Dana agrees to go on a date with Nick, and she invites him in at the end of the evening.

While the teams prepare to staff the technical support hotline, Billy is offered technical information by an introvert named "Headphones", which helps him. However, the team loses because Billy fails to log his calls for review. Dejected, he leaves the Google campus and pursues a job selling mobility scooters.

In the final task, which is a sales challenge, teams must sign the largest possible company to begin advertising with Google. Nick approaches Billy with an inspiring speech, encouraging him to return and help the team for the last challenge. Reinvigorated, Billy leads them to convince a local pizzeria owner how Google can help him interact with potential customers and thereby expand his business, while remaining true to his professional values.

Chetty is about to announce that Graham's team has won, when Billy, Nick, and their team arrive to give a dynamic presentation about their new client. Chetty recognizes that, although the pizzeria is not a large business, its potential is limitless because it is expanding via technology. Graham protests and is dressed down by Headphones, who turns out to be the head of Google Search. Nick and Billy's team win the challenge and the guaranteed jobs, while Graham, after berating his team members, is punched by Zach, an overweight member of his team whom he has constantly bullied.

As the students depart, Nick and Dana are still seeing each other, as are Lyle and Google's dance instructor Marielena. Stuart and Neha have formed a romantic connection as well with Stuart promising to see her in person rather than texting her, and Yo-Yo asserts himself to his mother.

== Cast ==
- Vince Vaughn as Billy McMahon
- Owen Wilson as Nick Campbell
- Rose Byrne as Dana Simms
- Max Minghella as Graham Hawtrey
- Aasif Mandvi as Roger Chetty
- Josh Brener as Lyle Spaulding
- Dylan O'Brien as Stuart Twombly
- Tobit Raphael as Yo-Yo Santos
- Tiya Sircar as Neha Patel
- Jessica Szohr as Marielena Gutierrez
- Josh Gad as Headphones/Andrew Anderson
- Eric André as Sid
- Harvey Guillén as Zach
- John Goodman (uncredited) as Sammy Boscoe
- Bruno Amato as Sal
- B. J. Novak as Benjamin
- Rob Riggle as Randy
- JoAnna Garcia Swisher as Megan
- Will Ferrell (uncredited) as Kevin
- Sergey Brin (cameo) as himself

== Production ==
Most of the scenes were filmed in Atlanta, Georgia and at Georgia Tech, which posed as a double for the Googleplex, although filming also took place at the actual Googleplex for five days. Vince Vaughn came up with the idea after watching a 60 Minutes segment on Google's work culture, and subsequently brought the idea to director Shawn Levy. Google agreed to work with the film producers, with founder Larry Page noting that "computer science has a marketing problem." Google also felt it would help further explain their "Don't be evil" mantra. Although Reuters reported that as part of the deal Google asked for "creative control", Levy denied the company was involved with the script, insisting that Google only assisted from a "technical" perspective. CNN reported that the studio did give "some control" to Google over the depiction of its products.

== Reception ==
On Rotten Tomatoes, The Internship has an approval rating of 34% based on 167 reviews and an average rating of 5.00/10. The site's critical consensus reads, "The Internship weighs down Vince Vaughn and Owen Wilson's comic charisma with a formulaic script and padded running time that leans far too heavily on its stars' easygoing interplay." On Metacritic, the film has a score of 42 out of 100 based on 36 critics, indicating "mixed or average reviews". Audiences polled by CinemaScore gave the film an average grade "B+" on an A+ to F scale.

A majority of reviews, even positive ones, derided The Internship for being a feature-length Google commercial. In his review, Ty Burr of The Boston Globe commented: "Here’s why Google is so successful: It's figured out a way for Twentieth Century Fox to make a two-hour Google commercial disguised as a summer comedy". Stephen Rea of The Philadelphia Inquirer wrote on his review, "The Internship itself would be kind of charming, too, if this Google-recruitment film, this 119-minute commercial for Googliness, weren't so downright creepy". The Guardian's David Cox described the movie as a "two-hour corporate video," while British film critic Mark Kermode called the film "the longest advert I've seen in the cinema". He dismissed it as "one of the most witless, humourless, vomit-inducing horribly self-satisfied, smug, unfunny comedies I have ever seen".

Another critique was that combining Vaughn and Wilson with Google was poorly timed, and that the film would have been much more successful, had it been released on the heels of Vaughn and Wilson's success in 2005's Wedding Crashers. This fact of timing was satirized by a video news story run by The Onion, a satirical newspaper, titled "The Internship Poised to be Biggest Comedy of 2005".

Many former Google interns and Google employees noted the accuracy of the company environment depicted in the film, but also noted that the internship process is nothing like that shown.

== Home media ==
The Internship was released in "Unrated" form on DVD and Blu-ray Combo Pack on October 22, 2013. This edition runs 125 minutes and contains profanity and nudity not found in the theatrical release.
