= Ryan Pinkston =

American actor

- Born: Ryan James Pinkston; February 8, 1988 (age 38); Silver Spring, Maryland, U.S.
- Occupation: Actor
- Years active: 2001–present
- Children: 1

Ryan James Pinkston (born February 8, 1988) is an American actor. He was a cast member on Punk'd, he played Arnold in the third Spy Kids installment, and played Billy Hunkee in Soul Plane. He also starred in the NBC sitcom Stumble.

== Life and career ==
Pinkston was born on February 8, 1988, in Silver Spring, Maryland, the son of Linda and Mark Pinkston. He is of partial Greek descent. Pinkston appeared on Star Search at the age of twelve and was subsequently a cast member on Ashton Kutcher's MTV show Punk'd. (He bears no relation to Rob Pinkston, another Punk'd alumnus.)

He starred in the sitcom Quintuplets; his older brother, Aaron, made guest appearances on the show. He graduated from River Hill High School in Clarksville, Maryland, in 2006.

Full of It opened on March 2, 2007; in the film, he plays a high school senior who lies to become popular. The film also premiered on ABC Family on September 16, 2007, and was released on DVD on September 25, 2007. He appeared in Lionsgate's College in 2008, alongside Drake Bell and Andrew Caldwell. He also appeared in Hannah Montana, which came out in 2006. His role is Connor, a friend of Oliver, and Miley falls for him, but later finds out how short he is and dumps him.

== Filmography ==
=== Film ===
Year	Title	Role	Notes
2003	Spy Kids 3-D: Game Over	Arnold	
2003	Bad Santa	Shoplifter	
2004	Soul Plane	Billy Hunkee	
2004	One Night in Ryan	Ron Jeremy	
2007	Full of It	Sam "Chapstick/Bridge Cable" Leonard	
2008	College	Fletcher	
2008	Foreign Exchange	Dave	
2008	Extreme Movie	Mike	
2009	Adventures in Online Dating	Brando	Direct-to-video
2010	I Owe My Life to Corbin Bleu	Pinkston	Direct-to-video
2010	BoyBand	Greg	
2011	Cougars, Inc.	Jimmy Rissoli	
2015	See You in Valhalla	Pauly Paparazzo	
2016	Undrafted	Jonathan Garvey	
2018	Delirium	Keith	

=== Television ===
Year	Title	Role	Notes
2002	Go Sick	Little Timmy	Television film
2003	Punk'd	Himself	6 episodes
2004–2005	Quintuplets	Patton Chase	Main role
2006	Teachers	Logan	Episode: "Golf"
2006	Veronica Mars	Danny Rossow	Episode: "President Evil"
2007	How I Met Your Mother	Kyle	Episode: "First Time in New York"
2008	Out of Jimmy's Head	Donny Ironsides	Episode: "Stunt"
2008	Hannah Montana	Connor	Episode: "Killing Me Softly with His Height"
2009	Party Down	Dennis	Episode: "California College Conservative Union Caucus"
2009	Bones	Eli Rounder	Episode: "The Beaver in the Otter"
2009	In the Motherhood	Syd	2 episodes
2010	10 Things I Hate About You	Yearbook photographer 2	Episode: "Don't Trust Me"
2010	Tower Prep	Gabe Forrest	Main role
2011	The Defenders	Doug Christensen	Episode: "Nevada v. Doug the Mule"
2012	House of Lies	Alex Katz-Nelson	Episode: "Mini-Mogul"
2012	Ben and Kate	Sam	Episode: "Career Day"
2015	Clipped	Ben	Main role
2016	The Skinny	Stuart	3 episodes
2016	Mary + Jane	Trent	Episode: "MarijuanaCon"
2016	Young & Hungry	Leo	Episode: "Young & Sofia"
2018–2019	Will & Grace	Officer Drew	8 episodes
2022–2023	Young Rock	Downtown Bruno	17 episodes
2023	Grey's Anatomy	Carlton Allyn	Episode: "Mama Who Bore Me"
2024	Laid	Brad	5 episodes
2025–2026	Stumble	Steven	Main role

== Awards and nominations ==
Year	Award	Category	Work	Result
2004	Young Artist Awards	Best Performance in a Feature Film - Young Ensemble Cast (Note: Shared with Bobby Edner, Courtney Jines, Matt O'Leary, Emily Osment, Daryl Sabara, Alexa Vega and Robert Vito)	Spy Kids 3-D: Game Over	Nominated
