= Full of It =

2007 American film

- Theatrical release poster
- Screenplay by: Jon Lucas; Scott Moore
- Story by: Yoni Berkovits; Tony Dreannan; Tom Gammill; Max Pross
- Directed by: Christian Charles
- Starring: Ryan Pinkston; Kate Mara; Teri Polo
- Music by: John Swihart
- Country of origin: United States
- Original language: English

Production
- Producers: Steve Barnett; Mark Canton
- Cinematography: Kramer Morgenthau
- Editor: Susan Shipton
- Running time: 91 minutes
- Production companies: Relativity Media; Atmosphere Pictures

Original release
- Release: March 2, 2007

Full of It is a 2007 American comedy-drama film directed by Christian Charles and written by Jon Lucas and Scott Moore. Starring Ryan Pinkston, Kate Mara and Teri Polo, the film follows a teenage boy whose outrageous lies magically come true.

The film was given a limited release in the United States by New Line Cinema on March 2, 2007. It aired on ABC Family as one of their Original Movies on September 16, 2007, under the title Big Liar on Campus.

== Plot ==
Sam Leonard is the new kid at Bridgeport High School, joining for the senior year. On his first day, he is humiliated by the school jock Kyle Plunkett, becomes friends with Annie Dray and falls in love with Kyle's girlfriend Vicki Sanders. When he goes to the guidance counselor, the counselor gives him the advice to lie to get the other kids to like him. Sam tells lies like "I drive a Porsche", "My dad's a rock star", "My dog ate my homework", "I never miss a shot" (at basketball) and that Vicki Sanders and his English teacher Mrs. Moran are pursuing him. That night, after an argument with his parents, he accidentally breaks the mirror behind his door. The next morning, Sam finds his dog actually eating his homework, he has a Porsche, he never misses a shot, and Mrs. Moran and Vicki Sanders are after him. Now he must find a way to fix what he's created.

== Cast ==
- Ryan Pinkston as Sam "Chapstick/Bridge Cable" Leonard
- Kate Mara as Annie Dray
- Teri Polo as Mrs. Moran
- Craig Kilborn as Mike Hanbo
- John Carroll Lynch as Hank Leonard
- Cynthia Stevenson as Jill Leonard
- Amanda Walsh as Vicki Sanders
- Derek McGrath as Principal Marcus Hayes
- Josh Close as Kyle Plunkett
- Matt Gordon as Coach Henderson
- Alex House and Nick Ouellette as Kyle's sidekicks
- Carmen Electra as herself

== Release ==
The film underwent four title changes from Nothing But the Truth to The Whole Truth to The Life and Lies of Sam Leonard back to The Whole Truth and finally settling on Full of It. When it aired on ABC Family, it was titled Big Liar on Campus.

It was eventually released theatrically in the United States via a limited release on March 2, 2007.

=== Box office ===
The film's widest release was 15 theaters; thus, its final domestic box office gross was $14,273. Overseas, it earned $472,449, making a worldwide total of $486,722.

=== Reception ===
Full of It received largely negative reviews from critics. On review aggregator website Rotten Tomatoes, it has a 6% rating based on 18 reviews, with an average score of 3.1/10. Metacritic reports a 33 out of 100 rating based on 8 reviews, indicating "generally unfavorable" reviews.

Peter Hartlaub of the San Francisco Chronicle wrote "It's still better than a lot of teen comedies with much bigger budgets".

Kirk Honeycutt of The Hollywood Reporter said that "There is a glimmer of comedy, but it's quickly swamped in overextended gags and broad caricatures".

=== Home media ===
The film was released on DVD on September 25, 2007.
