= Darla in Space =

2024 film by Eric Laplante and Susie Moon

- Release poster
- Directed by: Eric Laplante; Susie Moon
- Written by: Eric Laplante; Susie Moon
- Produced by: Erik Mygrant; Hunter Schlesinger
- Starring: Alex E. Harris; Thomas Jay Ryan; Constance Shulman; Jenn Lyon
- Cinematography: Eric Laplante
- Edited by: Eric Laplante
- Music by: Thomas Hughes; Gretchen Lohse
- Production company: Schohy Productions
- Distributed by: Freestyle Releasing
- Release dates: January 20, 2024 (Slamdance); September 27, 2024 (Quad Cinema); October 25, 2024 (Video on demand)
- Running time: 94 minutes
- Country: United States
- Language: English

Darla in Space is a 2024 American independent science fiction comedy film directed and written by Eric Laplante and Susie Moon in their feature directorial debut . The film stars Alex E. Harris as Darla Peterson who runs a business which makes custom caskets for cats. Thomas Jay Ryan, Constance Shulman, and Jenn Lyon also stars in supporting roles.

The film premiered at the 2024 Slamdance Film Festival on January 20, 2024. It is scheduled to have a limited theatrical release at the Quad Cinema on September 27, 2024, before releasing on video on demand platforms on October 25, 2024.

== Cast ==
- Alex E. Harris as Darla Peterson
- Thomas Jay Ryan as Arnot Pickens
- Constance Shulman as Leona Peterson
- Jenn Lyon as Dr. Brittney St. Clair
- Woody Fu as Stuart 'Stu' Fu
- Rasheda Crockett as Charity Legitimate

== Release ==
The film premiered at the 2024 Slamdance Film Festival on January 20, 2024, and completed in a Narrative Feature category. It later screened at the Indianapolis International Film Festival in April 2024. Freestyle Digital Media acquired the North American distribution rights. It is set to have a limited theatrical release at the Quad Cinema in New York City on September 27, 2024, before its debut on North American video on demand platforms and DVD on October 25, 2024.

== Reception ==
On the review aggregator website Rotten Tomatoes, 100% of eight critics' reviews are positive, with an average rating of 7/10.

Film critic Trevor Stucker from The Movie State gave it a positive review writing: "Alex E. Parris is a compelling lead with a distinguishably demanding personality and a committed performance, but it is Constance Shulman who stole the show for me. Her experience as an actress is clear as the stubbornness of her character reaches beyond the screen. I was simultaneously annoyed with her character and impressed by her performance." Norman Gidney from the HorrorBuzz gave in 6 out of 10 stars and also noted Shulman's performance as mother and Laplante and Moon for creative ideas.
