= Jenn Lyon =

American actress

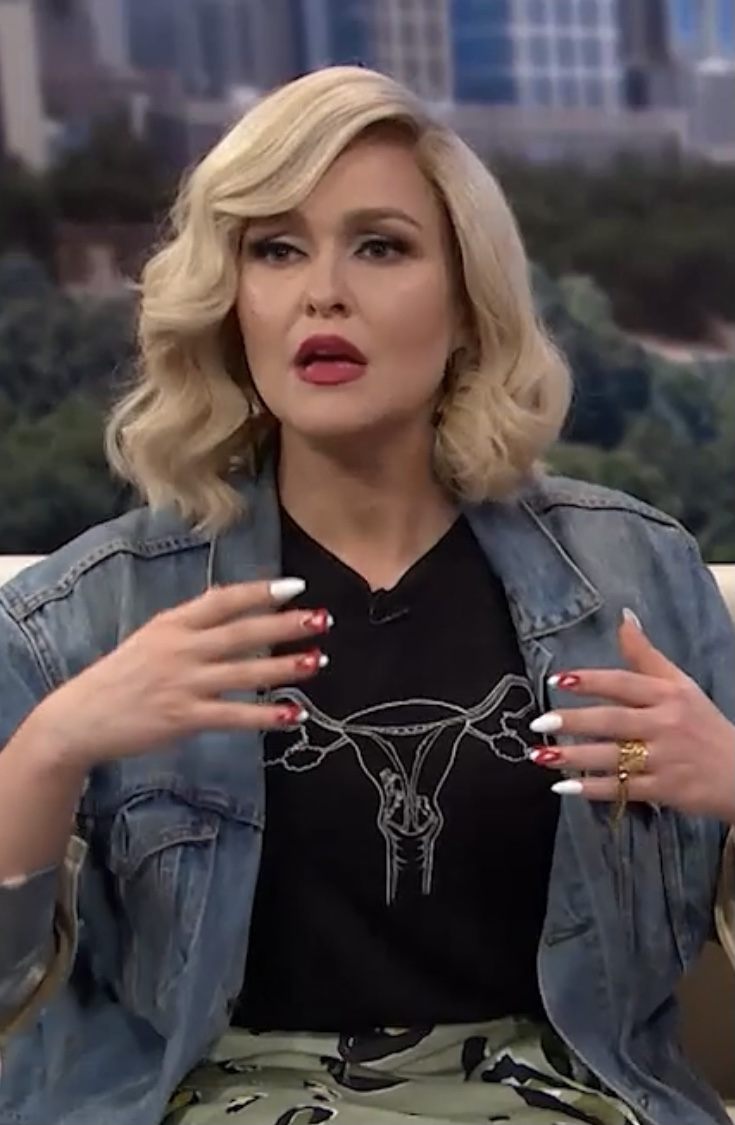
- Lyon in 2019
- Born: April 29, 1980 (age 46); High Point, North Carolina, U.S.
- Education: University of North Carolina School of the Arts (BFA)
- Occupation: Actress
- Years active: 2006–present
- Spouse: Taige Jensen (m. 2019)

Jenn Lyon is an American actress. She is known for her roles as Jennifer Husser on Claws (2017), Mackenzie Bradford-Lopez on Saint George (2014), Lindsey Salazar on Justified (2010), Esther Finch in Dead Boy Detectives (2024), and Gillian in Happy Face (2025).

== Early life and education ==
Lyon grew up in small towns in North Carolina. She is the daughter of a former Methodist minister. She moved around the state a few times growing up for her father's work. She attended Ferndale Middle School and High Point Central High School. She went on to study at the University of North Carolina School of the Arts, graduating in 2003.

== Career ==
Upon graduation, Lyon moved to New York where she worked in theatre and formed her own comedy sketch troupe POYKPAC in 2006. Her work with POYKPAC, led to her co-starring in the IFC web comedy television series Good Morning Internet!. As a member of POYKPAC, she was one of its writers and producers.

In 2011, she guest starred in Army Wives and Louie, before being cast in a recurring role as Lindsey Salazar in the FX series Justified, appearing in the series from 2012–2013. In 2013, she was cast as Mackenzie Bradford-Lopez in the FX sitcom Saint George, starring George Lopez, playing the ex-wife of Lopez's character.

== Personal life ==
Lyon married her long-term partner Taige Jensen at the Astoria World Manor in Queens in October 2019. The ceremony was officiated by her father. The couple had met 13 years earlier at a sketch comedy show in Brooklyn.

Lyon has opened up about her experiences with disordered eating and receiving treatment from the Renfrew Center. She considers herself a feminist and has vocally supported reproductive rights, body positivity, and other movements.

== Filmography ==
Film
Year	Title	Role	Notes
2014	The Flower Shop	April	Short film
2018	Blaze	Cinnamon	
2019	Before You Know It	Susan	
2024	ClearMind	Lilly	
2024	Darla in Space	Dr. Brittney St. Clair	
TBA	The Cackling of the Dodos		Filming

Television
Year	Title	Role	Notes
2008	Good Morning, Internet!	Colby Honeycutt	Main cast, web television series
2011	Army Wives	Lisa	Episode: "Drop Zone"
2011	Louie	Eunice	Episode: "New Jersey/Airport"
2012–2013	Justified	Lindsey Salazar	Recurring role
2013	Phil Spector	Focus Group Woman #3	TV movie
2014	Saint George	Mackenzie Bradford-Lopez	Main cast
2014	Suburgatory	Georgia	Episode: "The Ballad of Piggy Duckworth"
2017–2022	Claws	Jennifer Husser	Main cast
2020	The Neighbor in the Window	Lisa Beasley	TV movie
2024	Dead Boy Detectives	Esther Finch	Main cast
2024–2025	English Teacher	Linda Harrison	2 episodes
2024	Elsbeth	Celeste	Episode: "Diamonds Are for Elsbeth"
2025	Happy Face	Gillian	Episode: "Controlled Burn"
2025	Sirens	Cloe	Recurring role
2025–2026	Stumble	Courteney Potter	Main cast
