= Saint George (TV series) =

American sitcom

- Genre: Sitcom
- Created by: George Lopez; David McFadzean; Matt Williams
- Starring: George Lopez; Jenn Lyon; Olga Merediz; Kaden Gibson; David Zayas; Danny Trejo
- Composer: Dan Foliart
- Country of origin: United States
- Original language: English
- No. of seasons: 1
- No. of episodes: 10

Production
- Executive producers: George Lopez; Matt Williams; David McFadzean; Dete Meserve; Michael Rotenberg; Judd Payne
- Camera setup: Multi-camera
- Running time: 21-22 minutes
- Production companies: Wind Dancer Films; Travieso Productions; 3 Arts Entertainment; Lionsgate Television

Original release
- Network: FX
- Release: March 6 – May 8, 2014

Saint George is an American television sitcom created by George Lopez, David McFadzean, and Matt Williams, which originally aired on FX from March 6, 2014, to May 8, 2014. It is Lopez's first starring role in a scripted series since his ABC show George Lopez.

As part of Debmar-Mercury and Lionsgate Television's syndication model, if the series hit certain ratings thresholds in its first 10-episode run, that would have triggered an additional 90-episode order. The program fell short of those thresholds and Saint George was canceled on June 25, 2014, after one season.

== Plot ==
Saint George revolves around the hectic life of a recently divorced working class Mexican-American who has become a successful entrepreneur. Lopez portrays the main character who must balance his family life—consisting of a demanding ex-wife, an 11-year-old son, and his mother, uncle, and cousin—and teaching history class at a night school once a week.

== Cast and characters ==
=== Main cast ===
- George Lopez as Himself
- Jenn Lyon as Mackenzie Bradford-Lopez, George's former wife
- Olga Merediz as Alma Lopez, George's mother
- Kaden Gibson as Harper Antonio Bradford-Lopez, George & Mackenzie's son
- David Zayas as Junior, George's maternal cousin
- Danny Trejo as Tio Danny, George's maternal uncle

=== Recurring cast ===
- Diana-Maria Riva as Concepcion
- Joey Pollari as Tanner Whitman
- Tobit Raphael as Walden Penfield

== Episodes ==
No.	Title	Directed by	Written by	Original release date	Production code	US viewers (millions)
1	"Won't Get Fooled Again"	Joe Regalbuto	George Lopez & David McFadzean & Matt Williams	March 6, 2014	1007	1.209
George Lopez is a successful energy drink entrepreneur, a divorced dad, and a history teacher who teaches at night. George is then encouraged by his cousin and uncle to get back into dating.
2	"I Wish"	Bob Koherr	Spencer Porter	March 13, 2014	1006	0.763
George and Mackenzie have different ideas about the kind of birthday party Harper should have. When George goes with his idea behind Mackenzie's back, it leads to disaster.
3	"Why Can't We Be Friends?"	Bob Koherr	George Lopez & David McFadzean & Matt Williams	March 20, 2014	1001	0.792
It's George's day to take care of Harper, but he has to work, leaving Harper with the short-tempered Alma. George reluctantly has Danny do electrical work on his house.
4	"Having My Baby"	Bob Koherr	Denise Moss	March 27, 2014	1002	0.721
Alma begins to question whether Harper is actually George's son and wants George to take a paternity test to prove otherwise. George fears that he and Harper have nothing in common.
5	"Superstition"	Bob Koherr	Linda Videtti Figueiredo	April 3, 2014	1005	0.663
George makes Danny get a prostate exam. After signing his will, George begins to believe in old superstitions that his death is near.
6	"Carry On Wayward Son"	Joe Regalbuto	Jeff Stilson	April 10, 2014	1010	0.704
Alma slips on the kitchen floor and George is forced to take care of her, which threatens a round of golf he had scheduled with his idol, Lee Trevino.
7	"Hit Me With Your Best Shot"	Joe Regalbuto	Michael Davidoff & Bill Rosenthal	April 17, 2014	1003	0.736
Alma moves out of George's place after having an argument, and moves in with Danny and Junior. George teaches Harper how to box, much to Mackenzie's dislike.
8	"Hot Blooded"	Joe Regalbuto	Rick Marin	April 24, 2014	1004	0.522
Alma sets George up with her gynecologist, who turns out to be mentally unstable.
9	"School's Out"	Joe Regalbuto	Ian Gurvitz	May 1, 2014	1009	0.650
Mackenzie wants to get Harper into a private school, and asks George to attend a meeting with the headmistress Ms. Sloan (Kirsten Nelson), primarily because the school values diversity. Meanwhile, Danny and Junior sell a bunch of George's stuff at a swap meet, including one precious item without his permission.
10	"Rich Girl"	Joe Regalbuto	Michael Davidoff & Bill Rosenthal	May 8, 2014	1008	0.651
George begins dating Suzanne Duval (Kristin Bauer van Straten), a charming rich makeup mogul. When Suzanne ends up becoming the controlling one in the relationship, George starts to feel uncomfortable. Meanwhile, Danny and Junior try to get George to help them pitch their male fragrance idea to Suzanne, and Mackenzie ropes her into attending a charity auction.

== Reception ==
Saint George has been panned by critics. Reviews on the site Rotten Tomatoes were very scathing, with the show holding a 0% rating and average score of 3.6/10. The consensus reads: "You'd need the patience of a saint to sit through an episode of Saint George, a tired sitcom with bad potty-humor jokes and thin characters." Reception on Metacritic was somewhat better, but still negative, having a score of 31 out of 100, based on 14 critics, indicating "generally unfavorable reviews".
