= Tobit Raphael =

Filipino-American actor

Tobit Raphael Capati
- Born: June 14, 1989 (age 37); San Francisco, California, U.S.
- Occupation: Actor
- Years active: 2013-present

Tobit Raphael Capati is an American actor best known for his role portraying Yo-Yo Santos in the 2013 film, The Internship alongside Owen Wilson and Vince Vaughn.

== Early life ==
Raphael's parents both immigrated from the Philippines to San Francisco, California. He states that he grew up around Filipinos and embraced the culture. Raphael attended UCLA's School of Theatre, Film and Television and graduated in 2011.

== Filmography ==
Film
Year	Film	Role	Notes
2013	The Internship	Yo-Yo Santos	Supporting role
2013	Assistance	Zach	TV movie
2014	Saint George	Walden Penfield	(4 episodes)

Television
Year	Film	Role	Notes
2026-present	Avatar: Seven Havens	Ulan, Various voices	
