= Claws (TV series) =

American comedy-drama TV series

- Genre: Dark comedy; Crime drama
- Created by: Eliot Laurence
- Starring: Niecy Nash; Carrie Preston; Judy Reyes; Karrueche Tran; Jenn Lyon; Jack Kesy; Kevin Rankin; Jason Antoon; Harold Perrineau; Dean Norris; Jimmy Jean-Louis; Suleka Mathew; Evan Daigle
- Composer: Jeff Rona
- Country of origin: United States
- Original language: English
- No. of seasons: 4
- No. of episodes: 40

Production
- Executive producers: Eliot Laurence; Rashida Jones; Will McCormack; Janine Sherman Barrois; Howard Deutch
- Production location: New Orleans
- Production companies: Le Train Train; Warner Horizon Television (seasons 1-3); Warner Bros. Television (season 4); Studio T (season 1-2)

Original release
- Network: TNT
- Release: June 11, 2017 – February 6, 2022

Claws is an American comedy-drama television series created by Eliot Laurence that aired on TNT from June 11, 2017, to February 6, 2022. Set in Palmetto, Florida, the series is mostly filmed in New Orleans. The series was ordered for a first season containing 10 episodes on December 13, 2016, and was originally developed as a half-hour, single-camera comedy for HBO. Three more ten-episode seasons followed, in 2017, 2018 and 2021.

== Premise ==
Five manicurists at the Nail Artisans salon of Manatee County, Florida, enter the traditionally male world of organized crime when they begin laundering money for a neighboring pain clinic and eventually work their way up to controlling their own criminal empire.

== Cast ==
=== Main ===
- Niecy Nash as Desna Simms: the owner of Nail Artisans, a nail salon in Manatee County, Florida, and an associate of the Husser family. She launders money for one of their most profitable pill mills, so she can save up and buy a better salon. She is in a relationship with Roller Husser, the adopted son of his uncle, Uncle Daddy. When Uncle Daddy withholds some of her earnings, she blames Roller. She and Virginia, with whom he was cheating on Desna, attempt to kill him. It is later revealed that Desna and her brother, Dean, spent their childhoods with abusive foster parents, explaining why she's so determined to build a life for herself. She eventually gets permission to leave the mob but is subsequently forced to continue laundering money for the Russian mafia Desna ultimately sets out to build her own crime family after her brother kills the head of the Russian mob.
- Carrie Preston as Polly Marks: a redheaded North Carolinian who helps manage Desna's criminal enterprises. A former professional con artist, pathological liar, and skilled burglar, she only recently made parole for running a Social Security fraud scheme. Her relationship with Desna is one of absolute loyalty; she even threatens Virginia with a knife when she nearly implicates Desna in Roller's "death". She also forms a motherly bond with Marnie, an adolescent girl seeking to escape her own neglectful mother, who is trying to force Marnie into prostitution. Preston also portrays Lillian Marks, Polly's twin sister who pressures her to own up to her mistakes.
- Judy Reyes as Annalise "Quiet Ann" Zayas: the salon's lookout, doorman, and Desna's enforcer. She is college-educated, with plans to become a teacher, but her career was ruined when she was convicted of attempting to murder her husband after he stabbed her girlfriend. Ann, openly bisexual, has difficulty balancing her relationships with her role in the mafia, especially when she falls for a female police detective investigating the salon with whom she later breaks up. Later at the end of the third season, she has sex with a handsome guy she encounters at the party, which leads to an unexpected pregnancy.
- Karrueche Tran as Virginia Loc: a former stripper for Uncle Daddy's strip club, She She's, but now works at Nail Artisans. Desna fires her and throws her out in disgust after finding out she is sleeping around with Roller and suspecting that Virginia was the one who told Roller about Polly's ankle bracelet. Eventually, Virginia is accepted when she shoots Roller to defend Desna and proves her willingness to master the manicurist's trade. Later, she becomes pregnant after having sex with Dean, but goes through with an abortion and says yes when he asks to marry her. A failed assassination attempt causes her to lose an eye; the transplant, taken from a practicing psychic, gives Virginia empathetic abilities. She now runs the salon on Desna's behalf.
- Jenn Lyon as Jennifer Husser: Desna's oldest friend, right-hand woman, and Bryce's wife, with whom she has one daughter and another from a previous relationship. Having already lost more than a few relatives to the consequences of organized crime, she is adamant that Bryce not be part of his family's criminal business, but he does so nonetheless, causing a rift to form between her and Desna. When her family is absorbed by the Russians, she manages to keep her position at the salon thanks to Desna vouching on her behalf. However, an affair she has with a man named Hank threatens her marriage with Bryce, until they reconcile and she vows to be more faithful.
- Jack Kesy as Duane "Roller" Husser (seasons 1–3): Uncle Daddy's nephew, boyfriend to Desna and a high-powered drug dealer whose supposed death in the first episode triggers a conflict between the Hussers and Desna's salon. It is later revealed that he is alive, having been imprisoned by a woman as her sex slave. He escapes and rejoins his family, but when his dealings with the Russians are exposed, he and his brother and uncle are forced to work for them. He's in love with Desna even though he doesn't say it. He has sex with Desna and gets back together with her, even after she tried to kill him. He tries to shoot Desna but couldn't do it because she tells him she loves him. Eventually, he finds himself helping Desna establish her criminal empire. He later flees to Havana at the end of the third season in order to escape murder charges in the death of his cousin Clint.
- Kevin Rankin as Bryce Husser: Jennifer's husband and Roller's brother, who joins the Dixie Mafia to get justice for Roller's death and takes over his narcotics racket, though he is struggling to control his own addiction. When Roller unexpectedly returns, the two clash over his success. Bryce is subsequently forced to relinquish control of his business to the Russians when they absorb the Husser family and is later shot while taking part in an attack on his boss, Zlata. He and Jenn fix their relationship and try to leave the mob life behind, but return once they realize that they can't.
- Jason Antoon as Ken Brickman: a shady medical doctor who runs one of the Husser family's pill mills. He suffers from emotional instability stemming from his failed marriage but ends up finding a potential new romance with Polly. However, she dumps him when his work as a police informant is exposed.
- Harold Perrineau as Dean Simms: Desna's autistic brother whom she takes care of. He takes up bodybuilding as a hobby following Roller's "death", and falls in love with Virginia, one of his sister's associates. He also frees his sister from the grip of the Russians when he kills her boss, Zlata.
- Dean Norris as Clay "Uncle Daddy" Husser: Bryce's and Roller's uncle and the ruthless head of the Husser crime family. After the latter disappears, he starts grooming the former to succeed him but realizes too late that Roller's actions have put the family into deep debt with the Russians. Stripped of his independence, he turns to the Haitian mob for assistance. He now seeks to rebuild the Husser family by any means necessary.
- Jimmy Jean-Louis as Gregory Ruval (recurring in season 1; starring in season 2): A doctor and Desna's love interest, whose role as a boss in the Haitian mafia is unknown to her. He forms an alliance with the Hussers when they lose their interest in the Russians. Desna winds up killing him on their wedding night in the second-season finale after learning that he plans to kill her.
- Suleka Mathew as Arlene Branch (recurring season 1; starring seasons 2–3): Quiet Ann's girlfriend and a detective investigating Desna and Dr. Ken. Ann is reluctantly forced to frame her for drunk driving, and she is ultimately fired from the police force. However, this is a ruse as part of a sting operation aimed against the Russians and Desna. Ann subsequently breaks up with her for this deception. They eventually get back together and plan to start a family after Ann learns of her pregnancy from a prior one-night stand. Tragically, Arlene is murdered near the end of the third season by Benedict "The Professor" Liu.
- Evan Daigle as Toby Evans (recurring seasons 1–2; starring season 3; guest season 4): Uncle Daddy's boy toy who accompanies him everywhere. Uncle Daddy later cuts ties with him after he betrays Roller to the police over the murder of his other nephew Clint, and Toby later dies of unknown circumstances between the third and fourth seasons. He later reappears in the afterlife alongside Juanda near the end of the series, with both reuniting with Uncle Daddy following his death.

=== Recurring ===
- Dale Dickey as Juanda "Auntie Mama" Husser (seasons 1–2 & 4): Clay's wife who was killed by the Russians in the first season's finale. She appears as hallucinations to Clay in seasons 2 and 4.
- Hunter Burke as Hank Gluck (seasons 1–2): the owner of the Jewish cafeteria in Palmetto and a former sexual partner to Jennifer Husser. He is stabbed dead by her husband Bryce after signing over his property to the Hussers.
- Andrea Sooch as Riva (seasons 1–3): head of a powerful Russian mob family that does business in Florida. She's killed by her sister Zlata in the season 2 premiere.
- Franka Potente as Zlata Ostrovsky (season 2): the newly reformed, former black sheep daughter of a powerful Russian mob family that does business in Florida. She kills her sister Riva and assumes control of the Husser family's criminal interests, while also taking Desna under her wing. However, this is secretly a ruse to allow the Russians to seize the assets of the Haitian mafia. Zlata then tries to kill Desna, only to be shot dead by her brother Dean.
- Katherine Reis as Olga Ostrovsky (season 2): Zlata's daughter whom Roller was forced to marry. Despite their relationship being an arrangement, Olga develops real feelings for Roller over time, only for him to kick her out when she tips off Ruval to Desna plotting against him.
- Sheryl Lee Ralph as Matilde Ruval (season 2): the Haitian mother of Gregory, who runs a charity for orphaned girls. Although she appears to be disabled, this turns out to be false when she confronts Desna following her son's murder. Zlata then shoots Matilde and leaves her to bleed to death.
- Sherry Cola as Lucy Chen (seasons 2–3): a classified special agent working alongside Arlene to bring down the Russians.
- Glynn Turman as Calvin (season 3), Desna's and Dean's estranged father who comes back into their lives trying to make amends after turning his life around from drug addictions
- Bechir Sylvain as EJ (seasons 3–4): Jenn's ex-boyfriend and a recently released convict. He is the father of her biracial daughter Brienne.
- Michael Horse as Mac Lovestone (season 3): the Native American owner of the Bayside Rapture casino and a money launderer for various crime syndicates.
- Rebecca Creskoff as Melba Lovestone (season 3): Mac's wife and a co-owner of the casino. Due to lung damage from smoking, she constantly has to take breaths from an oxygen mask.
- Anthony K. Hyatt as Tony (season 4): An undercover DEA agent who infiltrates Desna's crew in the fourth season, and briefly woos her before later being killed by Bryce, who believed him to be having an affair with his wife Jennifer.

== Episodes ==
Season	Episodes	Originally released	
Season	Episodes	First released	Last released
1	10	June 11, 2017	August 13, 2017
2	10	June 10, 2018	August 12, 2018
3	10	June 9, 2019	August 11, 2019
4	10	December 17, 2021	February 6, 2022

=== Season 1 (2017) ===
No. overall	No. in season	Title	Directed by	Written by	Original release date	Prod. code	U.S. viewers (millions)
1	1	"Tirana"	Nicole Kassell	Eliot Laurence	June 11, 2017	U11.10045	1.18
In Manatee County, Florida, manicurist Desna Simms runs her business Nail Artisans with her close girlfriends Jenn, Polly, and Quiet Ann, all of whom have a history of incarceration or involvement with the Dixie Mafia. Desna launders money from selling painkillers for her off-and-on boyfriend Roller, the nephew of bi-sexual Dixie Mafia boss Clay "Uncle Daddy" Husser, through her salon. She hopes to save enough money to buy a nicer salon and a house where she can better care for her autistic brother, Dean, to whom she is deeply devoted. One of her colleagues, Polly, who has just been paroled for fraud, joins Desna and her friends at a New Year's Day celebration at Clay's bar, "She She's", a transsexual strip club. Pleased with Roller's success as a dealer, Clay gives him a larger cut of the profits. Desna discovers that Clay has reneged on a substantial bonus he had promised her, and she confronts Roller, but he refuses to help her. Furthermore, Roller insists that Desna fire Polly and permanently replace her with his current mistress Virginia, who Desna regards as nothing more than a freeloading whore. Instead, she and her crew assault Virginia and publicly humiliate her. The stress convinces her to split her cut with the girls, the only ones she can really trust. Later, during a visit to Roller's house, Desna snaps, attacks Roller and tries to drown him. He gains the upper hand and starts to strangle Desna, but is subsequently shot by Virginia.
2	2	"Funerary"	Howard Deutch	Eliot Laurence	June 18, 2017	U13.12752	1.20
Finding Roller's boat with the body of his murder victim inside, Desna and Virginia put Roller's body in the boat, set it on fire and set it adrift. Unbeknownst to them, the half-burnt boat strands on the nearby coast and the police find the burned remains of one man, which everyone assumes is Roller. When Desna goes to check on Virginia the next day, Desna finds she has run away. Jenn, Desna's oldest friend, is married to Roller's older brother, Bryce, a life coach who also has ties to the mafia. Bryce, a former crackhead, informs the other girls that Roller is missing. Polly is revealed to be a pathological liar when she seems to take on another personality while talking to a group of teenagers in a court-ordered program. Clay summons Desna to a meeting and asks her to find Virginia, as he is suspicious of her disappearance. Desna finds her living out of a dirty motel and convinces her to return. Clay offers Bryce the chance to run his pill mills, but Jenn, a recovering alcoholic, begs him to turn it down, afraid of gangster life and the temptation of getting back into drugs. Desna learns that a new, up-scale salon she wants to buy is no longer willing to sell, on account of an incident where Dr. Brickman, the quack doctor who works for Clay, disrupted the salon's working day. During Roller's raucous funeral, a battered Virginia bursts in claiming someone tried to kill her.
3	3	"Quicksand"	Jamie Travis	Eliot Laurence	June 25, 2017	U13.12753	1.07
Virginia spins a story about "Roller's killers" abducting and messing with her, angering Desna since her clumsy lies are making Clay even more suspicious. Dean, distraught by Roller's death, becomes increasingly worried for his sister's life. Desna's real estate agent, Mandy, ditches her as a client after the salon deal seemingly falls through for good. When Chip (Elvis Nolasco), a corrupt detective with the Palmetto PD, (who also happens to be an enforcer for the Hussers) comes by to check Virginia's story, Desna places a fake witness to back her up. Bryce agrees to temporarily take over Roller's operation under Desna's supervision. Dr. Brickman's instability grows worse after learning that his ex-wife is remarrying, and Bryce gets distracted, allowing a thief to steal the clinic's entire supply of pills. The girls take Mandy and some other clients on a drinking spree, during which Desna learns of the robbery as well as Clay's insistence that she and Bryce repay the $88,000 they now owe him for the loss of the pills. However, the theft turns out to be part of a plan to fully bring Bryce into the Dixie Mafia.
4	4	"Fallout"	Victoria Mahoney	Janine Sherman Barrois	July 2, 2017	U13.12754	1.24
Desna suffers recurring nightmares about being abused by Roller. Polly's wealthy former friend Sally, who believes Polly is a rich trophy wife named "Heather", unexpectedly visits the salon. Polly maintains the "Heather" persona and claims she's not a manicurist, but now a rich widow conducting research for a novel. Clay calls in Desna's debt, but allows her to repay it in installments. She comes up with a plan to increase sales at the clinic in order to free herself from his grip. Clay demands that Virginia identify the supposed perpetrator of Roller's death and then executes the man Virginia names, forcing the girls to clean up the murder scene. Bryce, a loving family man and reluctant gangster, is deeply traumatized by being forced by Clay to help him dismember the victim. Polly ditches the others to spend more time with Sally (Gina Torres), who offers her the chance to move into her guest house, but she is quickly exposed as a fraud when her ankle monitor goes off and Sally spots inconsistencies in her cover story. Desna's efforts raise enough to cover all but $15,000 of the debt, which Polly collects by blackmailing Sally. Desna learns that Clay has put a hit on Dr. Brickman, who gets thrown out of his ex-wife's engagement party after showing up drunk. Before Desna arrives, Bryce abducts Brickman and drives off with him, believing he is also one of his brother's killers.
5	5	"Bats**t"	Howard Deutch	Janine Sherman Barrois	July 9, 2017	U13.12755	1.19
With Jenn's help, Desna tracks Bryce to a remote swamp. At the last second, they persuade him to spare the doctor's life. While visiting the new salon, Desna is alerted by a neighbor that Dean is vandalizing a billboard featuring their old, abusive foster parents. The other girls suggest that Desna is enabling Dean's behavior, and that the new salon is a poor choice. At a meeting, the Hussers indirectly accuse Virginia of lying to them. When she and Desna argue afterwards, Polly takes it upon herself to intimidate Virginia and remind her to keep her mouth shut. Dean gets Desna to help him confront their foster parents and later reveals that he was raped as a child. Recognizing how the situation is making Dean unstable, Desna has Polly plant evidence framing them as Roller's killers. Desna learns from Mandy that another salon has made an offer. The mafia executes a hit on the foster parents, with Bryce acting as the triggerman and committing his first set of murders. Roller, who actually survived being shot by Virginia, wakes up to find himself the prisoner of a strange woman.
6	6	"Self-Portrait"	Tricia Brock	Leila Gerstein	July 16, 2017	U13.12756	1.25
Desna confers with Virginia and Polly, making it clear that Jenn must never learn that Bryce has been duped into murdering two people who actually had nothing to do with Roller's disappearance.. Roller's rescuer turns out to be dangerously delusional, believing that he is her soul mate and intends to trap him there forever. Desna decides to fire all of the manicurists at her new salon; in retaliation, they flood it and leave the girls with thousands of dollars' worth of repairs to make. As an incentive to keep him in the family, Clay offers Bryce more money and a new mansion. After being denied the chance to participate in the NailPalm tournament, Virginia ditches the girls and returns to prostitution. Desna meets Dr. Gregory Ruval (Jimmy Jean-Louis), a gynecologist who is patient and good-humored as her frantic life causes her to continuously interrupt their dates. After a last-minute substitution with Virginia for an injured Jenn, Nail Artisans goes on to win the tournament and the $15,000 prize. Roller desperately tries to phone Clay, but is forced to drop the call as his kidnapper threatens him with a gun. Jenn discovers the truth about the murder of Desna's foster parents from Dean.
7	7	"Escape"	Shira Piven	Bruce Rasmussen	July 23, 2017	U13.12757	1.27
Dean prepares to go on a trip with Virginia, upsetting Desna as she fears Virginia will break his heart. Polly takes in her teenage neighbor Marnie, after her mother is incarcerated. Desna asks Toby, Clay's transgender muse, to run Nail Artisans in her place so she can begin to cut her mob ties. Jenn quits her post at the salon on account of her newfound wealth, but also because she can no longer trust Desna. Ann's new girlfriend (and Chip's partner), Arlene Branch, encourages her to be more open about her feelings. Dean punches a man after he insults Virginia. A team of gunmen break into the mansion where Roller is being held and confirm his survival. After Dean is chosen as a performance artist's new model, Virginia gives him his first kiss and later has sex with him. At an anniversary party for Clay, Jenn angrily tries to choke Desna before Ann stops her. Drunk, she then fantasizes telling Bryce the truth, but ultimately decides not to. Desna asks Clay to release her from service to the mafia, and he finally agrees. Roller, strapped into a wheelchair and with a gun at his back, is taken by his kidnapper to an art show where Dean is performing. Virginia spots Roller just before the gunmen subdue his captor and rescue him.
8	8	"Teatro"	Nicole Kassell	Maisha Closson	July 30, 2017	U13.12758	1.59
Roller visits the salon with signs of amnesia, not remembering that Virginia shot him. Fearing the potential repercussions, Desna and the girls agree to return him to the Hussers. Overjoyed, Clay arranges for a special "white party" to celebrate his return. During lunch, Roller asks to go to Desna's house, and they have sex. The next morning, he catches her kissing Ruval, forcing Desna to lie about their past relationship. Bryce's success as a dealer incurs jealousy in Roller, and at the party, a fight nearly breaks out between them. Ken and Polly also end up having sex. Two Russian mobsters to whom Roller owes money demand it back, and he pretends to regain his memory, claiming that they were his attackers. Desna finds evidence that Roller embezzled money from the clinic to pay the Russians. When his request to attack them is denied, Roller ends up fighting Bryce before Clay breaks it up. The head of the Russian mob, Riva, confirms that Roller is in her pocket. When Desna confronts him, Roller abducts her at gunpoint.
9	9	"Ambrosia"	Marta Cunningham	Jeff Augustin	August 6, 2017	U13.12759	1.34
A series of flashbacks show Roller's first meeting with the ladies, Polly's arrest for identity theft, and Roller and Desna's growing romance; in the present, Roller explains his plan to clean out the mafia's accounts and frame Desna. She manages to pass along a code word to Polly before retrieving the money. Ann finds Arlene's files on Desna during a hookup. Bryce asks Clay to request approval for a strike on the Russians. Desna manages to puncture one of Roller's tires, forcing them to pull over for repairs. When a cop comes by, he refuses to help on account of being on the Hussers' payroll. Ann struggles between her love for Arlene and the need to protect Desna. Clay's patron Ted (Michael Emerson) is accidentally killed while visiting the club, and he hides the body in the club's freezer. Ann drugs Arlene, getting her arrested for DUI. As a final wish, Desna gives Dean her blessing to marry Virginia. Roller also reveals that Clay, not him, took the money Desna was owed. Polly figures out the meaning of Desna's code, just as Roller arrives to make the drop at an abandoned amusement park. He ends up killing the Russians and prepares to kill Desna as well, but she escapes.
10	10	"Avalanche"	Howard Deutch	Eliot Laurence	August 13, 2017	U13.12760	1.57
The girls reach the park in time to save Desna from Roller, but soon realize that Jenn and her girls are in danger. The Russians declare war on the Husser family, killing Clay's wife Juanda (Dale Dickey) and abducting one of Bryce's daughters. Desna finds Jenn with another man and informs her of the situation. Riva explains that Roller had a child with her niece, which explains why he'd been making payments to them. The Hussers get into a brawl before making up, and Clay concedes that the only way out of the crisis is to have Desna negotiate with the Russians. Marnie arrives at the salon looking for a place to stay, but Polly turns her away. Desna offers to give the Russians half of the family's revenue, despite not having Clay's permission. Polly catches Marnie's mother trying to sell her as a prostitute and buys her freedom with Ken's help. Clay approves the deal, but Riva changes her terms: complete control of the family's businesses in return for Roller's life. After a brief standoff, the Hussers and their associates are taken away to be put into service for the Russians, while Desna cuts a deal to continue laundering money on their behalf, on the condition that she returns to her old salon. Virginia discovers that she is pregnant. Desna gives Jenn the chance to take ownership of her other salon, but she and the others refuse to leave and vow to stay by her side until the end. The Hussers meet with their former rivals, the Haitian mafia, to discuss plans for an alliance; one of them turns out to be Dr. Ruval.

=== Season 2 (2018) ===
No. overall	No. in season	Title	Directed by	Written by	Original release date	Prod. code	U.S. viewers (millions)
11	1	"Shook"	Marta Cunningham & Dale Stern	Eliot Laurence	June 10, 2018	U13.13151	1.32
The Hussers continue to defy Desna's efforts to control them. Riva orders her to start running cocaine out of their strip club, to Clay's displeasure. Dean figures out that Virginia is pregnant. Riva's younger sister Zlata arrives from Georgia on a book tour. When Clay does not move the coke as promised, Desna and her girls go to pick it up from the cutting house; Riva arrives to berate them, but is then killed by Zlata for insulting her. Zlata takes over and recruits Ann and Virginia to hire male strippers for the club, with Polly training them. With Desna's help, Zlata then puts the Hussers in their place by showing Bryce a video of Jenn cheating on him and setting fire to Clay's mansion. She then forces Roller to marry her daughter Olga at gunpoint. Zlata also informs Desna that she will be giving her Jenn's house as a gift, as a sign that she is valued more than her girls.
12	2	"Cracker Casserole"	Dale Stern	Janine Sherman Barrois	June 17, 2018	U13.13152	1.14
Desna and Dean move in with Jenn, and give their house to Polly. The Hussers decide to find some dirt on Zlata, who informs Desna that she plans to open more pill mills by increasing revenue at Ken's clinic. Virginia accidentally admits to Desna that Dean got her pregnant, and that they have made an appointment at an abortion clinic. Ann stays with Virginia during the procedure and reveals that she had a baby when she was a teenager, but her parents forced her to give her up. Roller tries to plant a bug in Zlata's office; she catches him and decides to give him a position under one of her men. Desna plans to shoot a commercial for the pain clinic to attract customers. Dean proposes to Virginia, and Jenn agrees to one last date with the man she cheated on Bryce with. The commercial is a disaster until Desna and Polly come up with the idea to turn it into a rendition of "Good Vibrations" with the club strippers. Roller informs Bryce and Clay that the Russians plan to use the mills to sell coke. Jenn comes home ready to make peace with Bryce, only to find him having sex with her mother.
13	3	"Russian Navy"	Cheryl Dunye	Rick Cleveland	June 24, 2018	U13.13153	1.14
Ruval invites Desna and Dean to spend a day on his private yacht, where he introduces them to his elderly mother, Matilde; their extremely affectionate relationship disturbs Desna. Zlata asks Clay to introduce her to Chip so she can obtain protection for her pill mills. The girls trick Bryce into coming over to the salon, then hold a debate between him and Jenn with Polly as the moderator and Ann and Virginia as questioners, which quickly devolves into arguing and Bryce storming out. Jenn then has a nervous breakdown and starts binging on junk food and alcohol. Zlata, upon learning of Desna's situation, brings her and Ruval to her house for dinner, where she publicly humiliates Clay, forcing him to lick her shoe. Dean and Virginia begin the difficult transition to living together. Marnie discovers that Polly has an estranged twin sister who lives in Seattle. Desna tells Ruval to decide whether she or Matilde is more important to him.
14	4	"Scream"	Billie Woodruff	Maisha Closson	July 1, 2018	U13.13154	1.25
Ann finds herself feeling exploited and undervalued by everyone else; her brother, state senator Henry Zayas, visits and convinces her to come to her father's birthday party, though she is estranged from her parents. Matilde comes to the salon with some of her girls, where she meets Zlata. She makes it clear that Desna must prove she is worthy of her son's love. At the party, Ann has an argument with her parents. Eventually, they reveal that they are also gay, and that their anger towards her is because she refuses to leave her criminal life behind. Sometime later, Ann is called over to bail Jenn out of an arrest for shoplifting wine. Bryce decides to file for divorce, and lets it slip that the Hussers are planning something against Zlata. Polly scares Marnie away with her overprotective nature. Ann finally snaps and yells at Desna, before revealing her feelings for Arlene. Filled with guilt, Ann records a message confessing to setting her up. Arlene, who turns out to be undercover, arrests Dr. Brickman for questioning.
15	5	"Vaginalologist"	Dale Stern	Emily Silver	July 8, 2018	U13.13155	1.31
At a ceremony to open the new clinic, Roller warns Desna not to tip off Zlata, whose largesse is already beginning to upset the girls who envy Desna's privileges. Dr. Brickman is threatened with RICO charges unless he agrees to wear a wire. Zlata decides to add Dean to Polly's stable of performers over Desna's objections. Clay grows more and more unstable, seeing visions of Juanda, and eventually getting in a fight with some homophobes. Ken's mother urges Polly to figure herself out if she wants to connect with Marnie. Bryce ignores Jenn's pleas and serves her divorce papers. Ruval finally decides to propose to Desna. Roller and Olga bond over treating their baby's illness. Clay leads an attack on the club, during which Bryce is severely wounded and rushed to the hospital. Desna realizes that Zlata lied to her about wanting to negotiate with the Hussers, and drives to her mansion, where she discovers Ruval having sex with Zlata and admitting that his love for her is not real.
16	6	"Double Dutch"	Clare Kilner	Sam Forman	July 15, 2018	U13.13156	1.35
Heartbroken by Ruval's betrayal, Desna takes Dean to see their old foster mother, Ms. Wallace; a vision of her younger selves gives her the confidence to return to Palmetto. Bryce slips into a coma, and Roller goes after Zlata, who threatens to kill his son and orders a hit on Clay. Polly and Ann have to take care of Jenn's kids, leaving Virginia in charge of the salon. Ken interrupts the Hussers as they hold a vigil for Bryce, while Ann and Polly have a frank discussion about working for Zlata. Bryce suddenly wakes up after Jenn has sex with him, and Clay decides to snitch on Zlata and Ruval to Chip. Ken learns that he will not be able to take Polly with him into witness protection unless he marries her, so he decides to propose. Desna warns Clay that Chip is working for Zlata, and he murders him. In return, he agrees to help Desna. Polly admits to Ken that she is a criminal, which the police get on tape. Desna burns an expensive dress that Matilde gifted to her.
17	7	"Burn"	Jamie Travis	Sigrid Gilmer	July 22, 2018	U13.13157	1.30
Arlene uses Polly as leverage to force Ken to go after Zlata; he gets a recording of her torturing Roller for Clay's location. Afterwards, Olga reveals to Roller that he is not her baby's father. Seeking revenge, Desna recruits Clay, Roller, Ann, and Virginia to burn Ruval's coke supply. However, Clay talks Desna into stealing the coke instead of burning it, upsetting Ann and convincing her to leave the crew. Jenn briefly contemplates stabbing Zlata at the salon, but chooses not to when she realizes that doing so would make them the same. When Desna ponders why Zlata has been grooming her, Clay explains that her clean record--something none of the Hussers had--makes her ideal for running the clinics, and that Ruval would have gotten her business license when she died. Enraged, she throws him out. Ann goes to see Arlene for emotional support. Desna has Roller plant coke on Zlata's enforcer Boris, leading Ruval to kill him. Arlene arrests Desna for money laundering.
18	8	"Crossroads"	Cherie Nowlan	Jeff Augustin	July 29, 2018	U13.13158	1.30
Facing 25 to 30 years for laundering, Desna contacts Polly with orders to destroy any evidence linking the salon to Zlata; Dean, upset with the girls, wanders off. Hank drugs Bryce so he can pursue Jenn. The Hussers decide to sell the coke quickly to avoid being incriminated. Matilde advises her son to take out Zlata. Dean tries to bail Desna out, but gets expelled for disruptive behavior. While the salon is raided by the FBI, Zlata's attorney Lauren enters a not-guilty plea on Desna's behalf. Clay's buyers try to double-cross him, but he convinces them to help him instead. Desna is freed on bail, and reveals Arlene's betrayal to Ann. Jenn gets a warning out to Bryce, who distracts Hank long enough for the police to arrive. When Marnie's mother arrives for a second chance, Polly turns her away. She then learns about the wire from Ken, and breaks up with him; Ann does the same with Arlene. Dean, fed up, moves out of the house. Desna decides to marry Ruval, then kill him.
19	9	"'Til Death"	Jamie Travis	Janine Sherman Barrois & Maisha Closson	August 5, 2018	U13.13159	1.28
Polly suffers an asthma attack when Marnie disappears; the sudden arrival of Lillian compounds her misery. The girls (except for Polly) go shopping for dresses, where they run into Matilde, who insists that Desna wear a more "traditional" outfit for the wedding. The Hussers decide to open a rehab clinic in order to make more money off their customers once Zlata is eliminated. Bryce and Jenn are denied the loan they need for their new life in Tampa despite a passionate plea to the lender. Bryce stabs Hank dead after Roller forces him to sign over his business for the new clinic. Polly has a mental breakdown in front of Ken and the girls, and is put on a psychiatric hold. Clay and Roller give Bryce his money. Polly confesses that Lillian didn't drown in an accident; she murdered her out of jealousy. Desna accepts that, no matter how hard she runs away from it, she and the girls are criminals. Polly finally makes peace with Lillian. Desna agrees to let Dean take part in her wedding.
20	10	"Breezy"	Dale Stern	Eliot Laurence	August 12, 2018	U13.13160	1.48
Virginia narrates the events of Desna's wedding: after signing Ruval's prenup, Zlata tells Desna that she will have to kill him, which horrifies her. Roller's cousin Clint tries to drive a wedge between him and Clay by suggesting that he might have had something to do with Roller's father's death. A hurricane cuts the hotel's power, but Desna refuses to postpone the wedding; secretly, she cuts a deal with Arlene to snitch on Zlata. When the wedding concludes, Olga overhears Roller and Desna having sex in the bathroom. Clay nearly commits suicide out of guilt, but decides not to after a visit from Juanda's ghost. Olga tips off Ruval, and he attacks Desna; she manages to throw him off a balcony to his death. Zlata then kills Matilde and forces Desna to sign over Ruval's properties. Before she can kill Desna, Dean shoots her from behind. Arlene informs Desna that, while the charges against her will likely be dropped, her salon will have to close. Polly voluntarily enters a hospital for treatment. Desna cuts the Hussers out of her business dealings for good. Mandy provides Desna with a casino formerly owned by Ruval to manage. Shortly thereafter, Virginia is shot while shielding Desna from an attempted assassination.

=== Season 3 (2019) ===
No. overall	No. in season	Title	Directed by	Written by	Original release date	Prod. code	U.S. viewers (millions)
21	1	"Just the Tip"	Dale Stern	Eliot Laurence	June 9, 2019	U13.13551	1.57
While at the hospital with Virginia, Desna is approached by Mac and Melba Lovestone, Ruval's former casino partners, who offer to buy out her stake in the business. Dean becomes consumed by his desire for vengeance and even tries to steal his sister's gun before she talks him down. Polly and Jenn return in time for Virginia to wake from her coma. Roller locates the casino's accountant (who Mac and Melba tortured for asking for a raise), and she provides them with evidence that the pair are laundering money through the casino. Clay informs Desna that Clint was responsible for the shooting, and she and Roller kill him; Bryce and Jenn decide to move back to Palmetto. Desna decides she isn't ready for a serious relationship with Roller. The girls blackmail the Lovestones into giving them an equal stake. The real shooter, Toby, promises Clay that he won't go behind his back again.
22	2	"Muscle & Flow"	Jamie Travis	Janine Sherman Barrois	June 16, 2019	U13.13552	0.83
Desna buys back Nail Artisans. Bryce agrees to help run the Husser family's rehab clinic. Desna's first day goes poorly when she gets overwhelmed with decisions and then has to defuse a confrontation between Dean and the police. Jenn's baby daddy EJ asks to see his daughter, Brienne, and threatens to blackmail Jenn and Bryce for full custody. Since her coma, Virginia has developed uncanny emotional empathy and tries to heal Clay from his grief over the loss of Juanda. Clay has a spiritual epiphany and confesses to Roller that he killed his father for beating his mother to death. Unaware that he is the Lovestone's hitman, Polly is reluctantly attracted to Joe and tells Ken that she no longer loves him. She also learns that "Trip", one of the Lovestones' clients, is State Governor Patel, and that the couple plan to murder his demanding mistress, Penelope, after the casino's Miss Florida Muscles contest. Desna has Ann take Penelope to hide out her aunt's. Clay decides to move the Hussers out of organized crime and into the drug rehab business. Desna learns that Patel is laundering bribes. Joe tracks down Penelope and kills her.
23	3	"Welcome to the Pleasuredome"	Dale Stern	Maisha Closson	June 23, 2019	U13.13553	0.62
Desna gets a new house because Jenn's family is driving her nuts. Mandy finds her a fabulous place, and Des asks Dean to move in with her but he refuses because Des doesn't want him to spend time at the casino. Bryce convinces Jenn to let EJ visit Brienne, and EJ brings her a black doll. Roller asks Pol to help him woo Des, so Pol takes him shopping and teaches him some manners. The girls discover Penelope's body in a pedicure chair at the shop. Des gets rid of the body. Clay, Bryce, and Toby go to the Peter Pain clinic and offer half-off drugs to recruit clients for their rehab center, but the pillbillies leave when they realize Clay is only trying to rehabilitate them. Virginia feels neglected and meets a nice guy at the shrimp shack. Des sees handsome Roller in his new duds at the casino and is very impressed. He asks her for a real dinner date tomorrow night. Dean becomes a mahjong addict after Mac teaches him how to play at the casino. The girls go to the governor's party/fundraiser/orgy where the champagne is drugged. Ann meets a handsome man and has sex with him. Des gets the governor alone and learns that he is taking bribes from contractors building private prisons. Des tries to take over the casino by blackmailing Mac and Melba with that information. Jenn's mother Brenda shows up at Clay's rehab center wanting to be rehabilitated. That night Roller is abducted while on his way to Des's house. She thinks he has ghosted her.
24	4	"Boy, Bye"	Sheree Folkson	Sam Forman	June 30, 2019	U13.13554	0.81
25	5	"Zaddy Was a Rolling Stone"	Niecy Nash	Darrin Dortch	July 7, 2019	U13.13555	0.74
26	6	"Fly Like an Eagle"	Clare Kilner	Sharon Lee Watson	July 14, 2019	U13.13556	0.81
27	7	"Chicken Pussy"	Jamie Travis	Sigrid Gilmer	July 21, 2019	U13.13557	0.89
28	8	"What is Happening to America"	Carrie Preston	Doug Stockstill	July 28, 2019	U13.13558	0.73
29	9	"Melba Toast"	Erica Watson	Emily Silver	August 4, 2019	U13.13559	0.77
30	10	"Finna"	Dale Stern	Janine Sherman Barrois & Eliot Laurence	August 11, 2019	U13.13560	0.92

=== Season 4 (2021–22) ===
No. overall	No. in season	Title	Directed by	Written by	Original release date	Prod. code	U.S. viewers (millions)
31	1	"Chapter One: Betrayal"	Dale Stern	Eliot Laurence & Sharon Lee Watson & Emily Silver	December 17, 2021 (Note: A sneak peek of this episode aired on December 17, 2021, on TBS's Friday Night Vibes Block ahead of the actual premiere of the episode on December 19, 2021.)	U13.14101	0.26
32	2	"Chapter Two: Vengenace"	Cheryl Dunye	Sam Forman & Darrin Dortch	December 19, 2021	U13.14102	0.40
33	3	"Chapter Three: Ambition"	Carrie Preston	Doug Stockstill & Sigrid Gilmer	December 26, 2021	U13.14103	0.43
34	4	"Chapter Four: Loyalty"	Damian Marcano	Janine Sherman Barrios & Sharon Lee Watson	December 26, 2021	U13.14104	0.35
35	5	"Chapter Five: Comeuppance"	Steve Adelson	Emily Silver & Doug Stockstill	January 2, 2022	U13.14105	0.43
36	6	"Chapter Six: Greed"	Dale Stern	Sam Forman & Sigrid Gilmer	January 9, 2022	U13.14106	0.40
37	7	"Chapter Seven: Ascension"	Dale Stern	Janine Sherman Barrios & David Rambo & Darrin Dortch	January 16, 2022	U13.14107	0.43
38	8	"Chapter Eight: Reckoning"	Damian Marcano	Sharon Lee Watson & Emily Silver & Sam Forman	January 23, 2022	U13.14108	0.52
39	9	"Chapter Nine: Wrath"	Damian Marcano	Sharon Lee Watson & Emily Silver & David Rambo	January 30, 2022	U13.14109	0.41
40	10	"Chapter Ten: Mercy"	Dale Stern	Eliot Laurence	February 6, 2022	U13.14110	0.60

== Development ==
=== Filming ===
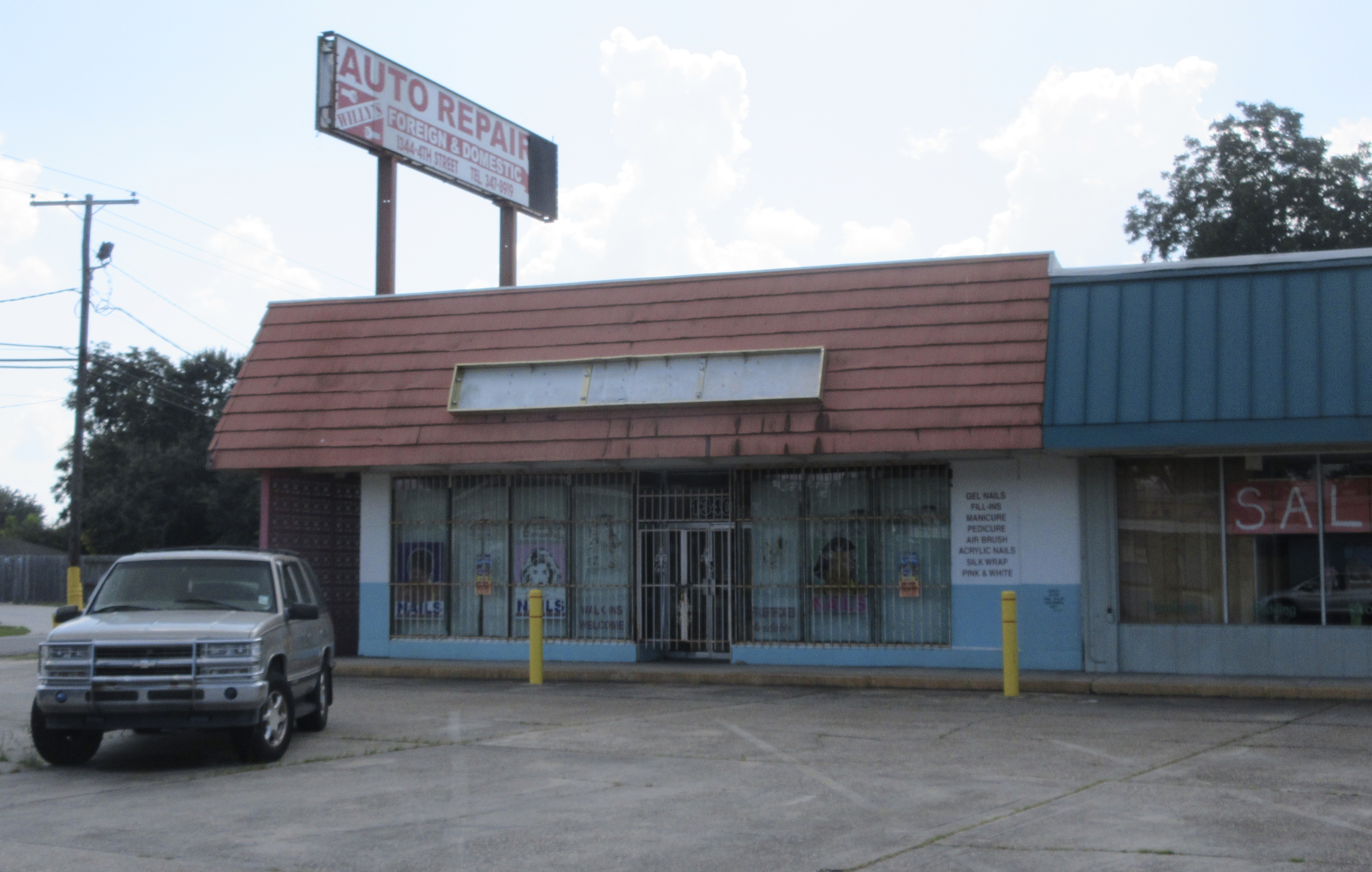
Storefront in Westwego, Louisiana used in the series

On March 12, 2020, Warner Bros. Television shut down production on the series' fourth and final season due to the COVID-19 pandemic. Filming resumed on September 21, 2020, and concluded on November 30, 2020.

== Reception ==
=== Critical response ===
The first season of Claws has received mostly positive reviews. On the review aggregator website Rotten Tomatoes, the series has an approval rating of 82% based on 34 reviews, with an average rating of 6.69/10. The website's critical consensus reads, "Well-acted, visually impressive, and energetically paced, Claws leaves a mark with a strong first season that hints at even greater potential." Metacritic, which uses a weighted average, assigned a score of 64 out of 100 based on 21 critics, indicating "generally favorable reviews". Variety described the show as aesthetically captivating but with weak storytelling. Season 2 has an 88% approval rating on Rotten Tomatoes, with an average rating of 8.6/10 based on 8 reviews.

=== Ratings ===
==== Season 1 ====
Viewership and ratings per episode of Claws
No.	Title	Air date	Rating (18–49)	Viewers (millions)	DVR (18–49)	DVR viewers (millions)	Total (18–49)	Total viewers (millions)
1	"Tirana"	June 11, 2017	0.4	1.18	0.3	—N/a	0.7	—N/a
2	"Funerary"	June 18, 2017	0.4	1.20	0.5	0.99	0.9	2.19
3	"Quicksand"	June 25, 2017	0.4	1.07	0.5	1.06	0.9	2.13
4	"Fallout"	July 2, 2017	0.5	1.24	—N/a	—N/a	—N/a	—N/a
5	"Bats**t"	July 9, 2017	0.4	1.19	—N/a	—N/a	—N/a	—N/a
6	"Self-Portrait"	July 16, 2017	0.5	1.25	0.4	1.04	0.9	2.29
7	"Escape"	July 23, 2017	0.5	1.27	0.4	1.08	0.9	2.35
8	"Teatro"	July 30, 2017	0.6	1.58	—N/a	—N/a	—N/a	—N/a
9	"Ambrosia"	August 6, 2017	0.5	1.34	0.6	1.28	1.1	2.62
10	"Avalanche"	August 13, 2017	0.6	1.57	0.4	1.13	1.0	2.70

==== Season 2 ====
Viewership and ratings per episode of Claws
No.	Title	Air date	Rating (18–49)	Viewers (millions)	DVR (18–49)	DVR viewers (millions)	Total (18–49)	Total viewers (millions)
1	"Shook"	June 10, 2018	0.5	1.32	0.5	1.10	1.0	2.42
2	"Cracker Casserole"	June 17, 2018	0.5	1.14	0.4	—N/a	0.9 (Note: Live +7 ratings were not available, so Live +3 ratings have been used instead.)	—N/a
3	"Russian Navy"	June 24, 2018	0.4	1.14	0.4	1.07	0.8	2.21
4	"Scream"	July 1, 2018	0.4	1.25	—N/a	—N/a	—N/a	—N/a
5	"Vaginalologist"	July 8, 2018	0.5	1.31	0.3	—N/a	0.8	—N/a
6	"Double Dutch"	July 15, 2018	0.4	1.35	0.5	1.09	0.9	2.45
7	"Burn"	July 22, 2018	0.5	1.30	0.4	1.03	0.9	2.33
8	"Crossroads"	July 29, 2018	0.4	1.30	0.5	—N/a	0.9	—N/a
9	"Til Death"	August 5, 2018	0.4	1.28	0.4	0.97	0.8	2.25
10	"Breezy"	August 12, 2018	0.5	1.48	0.4	0.89	0.9	2.38

==== Season 3 ====
Viewership and ratings per episode of Claws
No.	Title	Air date	Rating (18–49)	Viewers (millions)	DVR (18–49)	DVR viewers (millions)	Total (18–49)	Total viewers (millions)
1	"Just the Tip"	June 9, 2019	0.4	1.57	0.3	0.80	0.7	1.85
2	"Muscle & Flow"	June 16, 2019	0.3	0.83	0.3	0.82	0.6	1.65
3	"Welcome to the Pleasuredome"	June 23, 2019	0.2	0.62	0.4	0.84	0.6	1.46
4	"Boy, Bye"	June 30, 2019	0.3	0.81	0.3	0.75	0.6	1.51
5	"Zaddy Was a Rolling Stone"	July 7, 2019	0.3	0.74	0.2	0.77	0.5	1.51
6	"Fly Like An Eagle"	July 14, 2019	0.3	0.81	—N/a	0.71	—N/a	1.52
7	"Chicken Pussy"	July 21, 2019	0.3	0.89	0.3	—N/a	0.6	—N/a
8	"What is Happening to America"	July 28, 2019	0.3	0.73	0.1	0.43	0.4	1.16
9	"Melba Toast"	August 4, 2019	0.3	0.77	0.2	0.53	0.5	1.30
10	"Finna"	August 11, 2019	0.3	0.92	0.3	0.70	0.6	1.62

==== Season 4 ====
Viewership and ratings per episode of Claws
No.	Title	Air date	Rating (18–49)	Viewers (millions)	DVR (18–49)	DVR viewers (millions)	Total (18–49)	Total viewers (millions)
1	"Chapter One: Betrayal"	December 17, 2021	0.1	0.26	TBD	TBD	TBD	TBD
2	"Chapter Two: Vengenace"	December 19, 2021	0.1	0.40	TBD	TBD	TBD	TBD
3	"Chapter Three: Ambition"	December 26, 2021	0.1	0.43	TBD	TBD	TBD	TBD
4	"Chapter Four: Loyalty"	December 26, 2021	0.1	0.35	TBD	TBD	TBD	TBD
5	"Chapter Five: Comeuppance"	January 2, 2022	0.1	0.43	TBD	TBD	TBD	TBD
6	"Chapter Six: Greed"	January 9, 2022	0.1	0.40	TBD	TBD	TBD	TBD
7	"Chapter Seven: Ascension"	January 16, 2022	0.1	0.43	TBD	TBD	TBD	TBD
8	"Chapter Eight: Reckoning"	January 23, 2022	0.1	0.52	TBD	TBD	TBD	TBD
9	"Chapter Nine: Wrath"	January 30, 2022	0.1	0.41	TBD	TBD	TBD	TBD
10	"Chapter Ten: Mercy"	February 6, 2022	0.2	0.60	TBD	TBD	TBD	TBD

=== Accolades ===
Year	Award	Category	Nominee(s)	Result	Ref.
2018	NAACP Image Awards	Outstanding Actress in a Comedy Series	Niecy Nash	Nominated	
2018	NAACP Image Awards	Outstanding Writing in a Comedy Series	Janine Sherman Barrois	Won	
2018	Satellite Awards	Best Musical or Comedy Series	Claws	Nominated	
2018	Satellite Awards	Best Actress in a Musical or Comedy Series	Niecy Nash	Won	
2018	Black Reel Awards	Outstanding Actress in a Drama Series	Niecy Nash	Nominated	
2018	Black Reel Awards	Outstanding Supporting Actor in a Drama Series	Harold Perrineau	Nominated	
2019	Black Reel Awards	Outstanding Drama Series	Claws	Nominated	
2019	Black Reel Awards	Outstanding Actress in a Drama Series	Niecy Nash	Nominated	
2019	Black Reel Awards	Outstanding Writing in a Drama Series	Maisha Clossom	Nominated	
2019	Satellite Awards	Best Actress in a Comedy or Musical Series	Niecy Nash	Nominated	
